= 775th Troop Carrier Squadron =

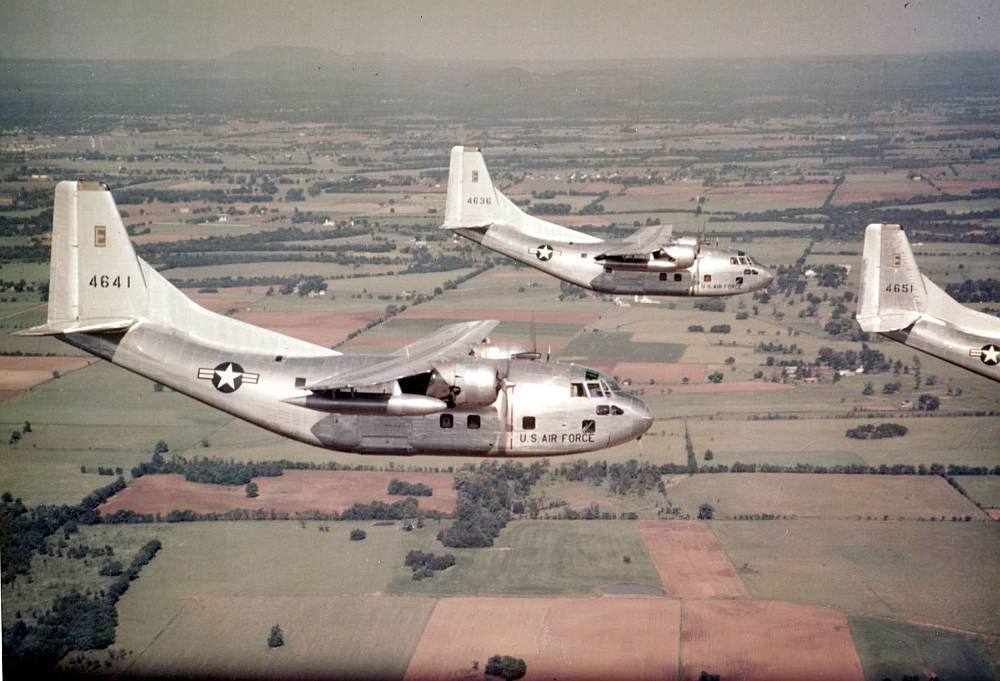
- Three C-123B Providers in formation
- Active: 1943–1945; 1955–1957; 1964
- Country: United States
- Branch: United States Air Force
- Role: Airlift
- Engagements: Mediterranean Theater of Operations
- Decorations: Distinguished Unit Citation

Insignia
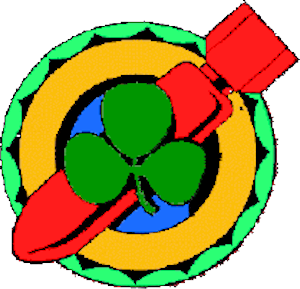
- Emblem of the 775th Bombardment Squadron (Note: Approved 3 May 1945)

The 775th Troop Carrier Squadron is an inactive United States Air Force unit. It was last assigned to the 1st Air Commando Wing at Hurlburt Field, Florida in July 1964.

The squadron was first activated as the 775th Bombardment Squadron during World War II. After training in the United States with Boeing B-17 Flying Fortress heavy bombers, it deployed to the Mediterranean Theater of Operations, where it participated in the strategic bombing campaign against Germany, earning two Distinguished Unit Citations before inactivating in Italy.

The squadron was redesignated the 775th Troop Carrier Squadron and activated in June 1955 at Ardmore Air Force Base, Oklahoma and equipped with Fairchild C-119 Flying Boxcars. It was inactivated in August 1957, when the 463d Troop Carrier Wing completed its transition to the Lockheed C-130 Hercules. At was activated again at Pope Air Force Base and equipped with Fairchild C-123B Providers. The squadron moved to Hurlbert, where its assets were used to form the 317th Air Commando Squadron and the squadron was inactivated.

== History ==
=== World War II ===
==== Training in the United States ====
The squadron was first activated as the 775th Bombardment Squadron at Geiger Field, Washington on 1 August 1943 as one of the four original squadrons of the 463d Bombardment Group. The 775th moved to Rapid City Army Air Base, South Dakota, where it received its initial cadre. On 1 September, the key personnel of the squadron and 463d Group moved to Orlando Army Air Base, where they participated in advanced tactical training with the Army Air Forces School of Applied Tactics. A model crew from the squadron moved to Montbrook Army Air Field to participate in simulated missions with a Boeing B-17 Flying Fortress. The cadre returned to Rapid City at the end of the month, where the ground echelon of the squadron was filled out and ground school begun.

The squadron moved to MacDill Field, Florida in November and began flight training with the Flying Fortress, although its air echelon was not fully manned until early December. on 2 February, the squadron's ground echelon departed Florida for the port of embarkation at Camp Patrick Henry, Virginia, for shipment to the Mediterranean Theater of Operations, while the air echelon ferried their B-17s via the southern ferry route.

==== Combat in the Mediterranean Theater ====
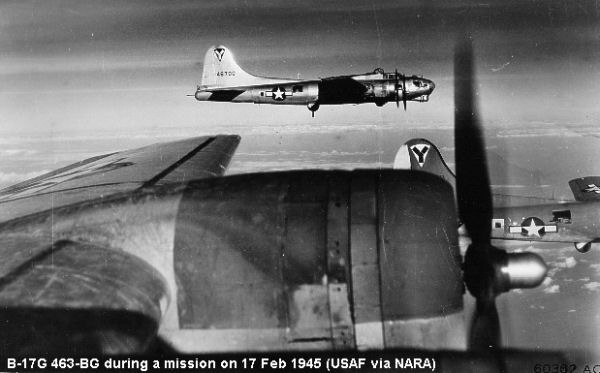
B-17 of the 463d Bomb Group on a mission

The squadron arrived in Italy in March 1944 and flew its first combat mission from Celone Airfield on 30 March against an airfield at Imotski, Yugoslavia. It engaged primarily in the strategic bombing campaign against Germany. It attacked targets like marshalling yards, oil refineries and aircraft factories in Austria, Czechoslovakia, Germany, Greece, Romania and Yugoslavia.. The squadron was awarded a Distinguished Unit Citation (DUC) for a mission against oil refineries in Ploiești, Romania on 18 May 1944. Clouds that obscured the target resulted in Fifteenth Air Force recalling the mission, but the squadron and the rest of the 463d Group did not receive the recall message and was the only unit to continue on, causing major destruction to the target. Although crippled by intense fighter attacks, they also inflicted severe damage on the opposing air defenses. On 24 May 1945, the 463d Group led the 5th Bombardment Wing in an attack against a Daimler-Benz tank factory at Berlin, Germany. The squadron made a successful attack despite three separate attacks by enemy air defenses, including attacks by German jet fighters. This action earned the squadron its second DUC.

The squadron was occasionally diverted from its strategic mission to perform air support and air interdiction missions. In May and June 1944, it bombed bridges to support the campaign for the liberation of Rome. In August 1944, it struck bridges, gun positions and other targets to support Operation Dragoon, the invasion of southern France. It hit military airbases, bridges and other tactical targets to support partisan forces and the Red Army advance in the Balkans. During the last months of the war the squadron operated primarily to support Operation Grapeshot, the spring 1945 offensive in Northern Italy.

The squadron flew its final combat mission on 26 April 1945. After V-E Day the squadron transported personnel (primarily soldiers of Fifth Army) from Italy to Casablanca for return to the United States. By early September, the unit had been substantially reduced by transfers to other units and returns of personnel to the United States and it was inactivated in Italy with the end of Project Green in September 1945.

=== Airlift operations ===
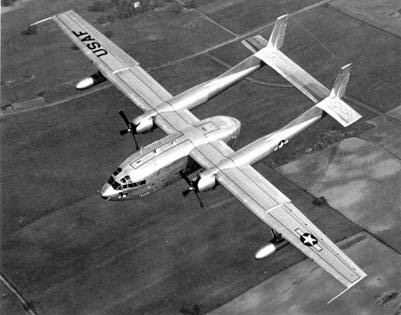
C-119 as flown by the squadron

In 1955, the 463d Troop Carrier Wing at Ardmore Air Force Base, Oklahoma was preparing to convert its three assigned Fairchild C-119 Flying Boxcar squadrons to the new Lockheed C-130 Hercules. Tactical Air Command (TAC) activated the squadron as the 775th Troop Carrier Squadron at Sewart Air Force Base, Tennessee, where it trained with the C-119. In November, the squadron moved to Ardmore. While the other squadrons of the 463d Wing were transitioning to the new airplane, the squadron engaged in transport of equipment and supplies with the Flying Boxcar, including support of Army airborne units until inactivated in 1957 when the wing had transitioned to the Hercules. The surplus C-119s were mostly transferred to reserve units.

In the spring of 1964, the 464th Troop Carrier Wing had completed the transition of its operational units from the Fairchild C-123 Provider to the C-130 Hercules. TAC organized its remaining C-123 assets into the 775th Squadron on 1 April. Two weeks later, the squadron moved to Eglin Air Force Auxiliary Field No. 9 (Hurlburt Field), Florida, where it was assigned to the 1st Air Commando Wing. On 1 July, the squadron was inactivated and its assets transferred to the 317th Air Commando Squadron, which was simultaneously activated.

The squadron was apparently converted to provisional status as the 775th Expeditionary Airlift Squadron. That squadron was awarded credit for participation in the War on Terrorism.

== Lineage ==
- Constituted 775th Bombardment Squadron (Heavy) on 19 May 1943

Redesignated 775th Bombardment Squadron, Heavy on 29 September 1944
Activated on 1 August 1943
Inactivated on 25 September 1945

- Redesignated 775th Troop Carrier Squadron, Medium on 24 May 1955

Activated on 8 June 1955
Inactivated on 1 August 1957

- Redesignated 775th Troop Carrier Squadron, Assault on 29 October 1963 and activated (not organized)

Organized on 1 April 1964
Inactivated on 1 July 1964

- Apparently converted to provisional status and redesignated 775th Expeditionary Airlift Squadron

=== Assignments ===
- 463d Bombardment Group, 1 August 1943 – 25 September 1945
- 463d Troop Carrier Group, 8 June 1955 – 1 August 1957
- Tactical Air Command, 29 October 1963 (not organized)
- 464th Troop Carrier Wing, 1 April 1964
- 1st Air Commando Wing, 15 April 1964 – 1 July 1964
- Air Combat Command, to activate or inactivate as needed

=== Stations ===
- Geiger Field, Washington, 1 August 1943
- Rapid City Army Air Base, South Dakota, August 1943
- MacDill Field, Florida, 4 November 1943
- Drane Field, Florida, 3 January 1944
- Celone Airfield, Italy (ground echelon), 11 March 1944
- Pomigliano Airfield, Italy, 26 May 1945
- Celone Airfield, Italy, 3–25 September 1945
- Sewart Air Force Base, Tennessee, 8 June 1955
- Ardmore Air Force Base, Oklahoma, 10 November 1955 – 1 August 1957
- Pope Air Force Base, North Carolina, 1 April 1964
- Eglin Auxiliary Airfield No. 9 (Hurlburt Field), 15 April 1964 – 1 July 1964

=== Aircraft ===
- Boeing B-17 Flying Fortress, 1943–1945
- Fairchild C-119 Flying Boxcar, 1955–1957
- Fairchild C-123 Provider, 1964

=== Awards and campaigns ===
Award streamer	Award	Dates	Notes
	Distinguished Unit Citation	18 May 1944	Ploesti, Romania, 775th Bombardment Squadron
	Distinguished Unit Citation	24 March 1945	Berlin, Germany, 775th Bombardment Squadron

Campaign Streamer	Campaign	Dates	Notes
	Air Offensive, Europe	11 March 1944–5 June 1944	775th Bombardment Squadron
	Air Combat, EAME Theater	11 March 1944–11 May 1945	775th Bombardment Squadron
	Rome-Arno	11 March–9 September 1944	775th Bombardment Squadron
	Central Europe	22 March 1944–21 May 1945	775th Bombardment Squadron
	Normandy	6 June 1944–24 July 1944	775th Bombardment Squadron
	Northern France	25 July 1944–14 September 1944	775th Bombardment Squadron
	Southern France	15 August 1944–14 September 1944	775th Bombardment Squadron
	North Apennines	10 September 1944–4 April 1945	775th Bombardment Squadron
	Rhineland	15 September 1944–21 March 1945	775th Bombardment Squadron
	Po Valley	3 April 1945–8 May 1945	775th Bombardment Squadron
	Global War on Terror Expeditionary Medal		775th Expeditionary Airlift Squadron

== See also ==
- Boeing B-17 Flying Fortress Units of the Mediterranean Theater of Operations
