= 773rd Airlift Squadron =

United States Air Force unit

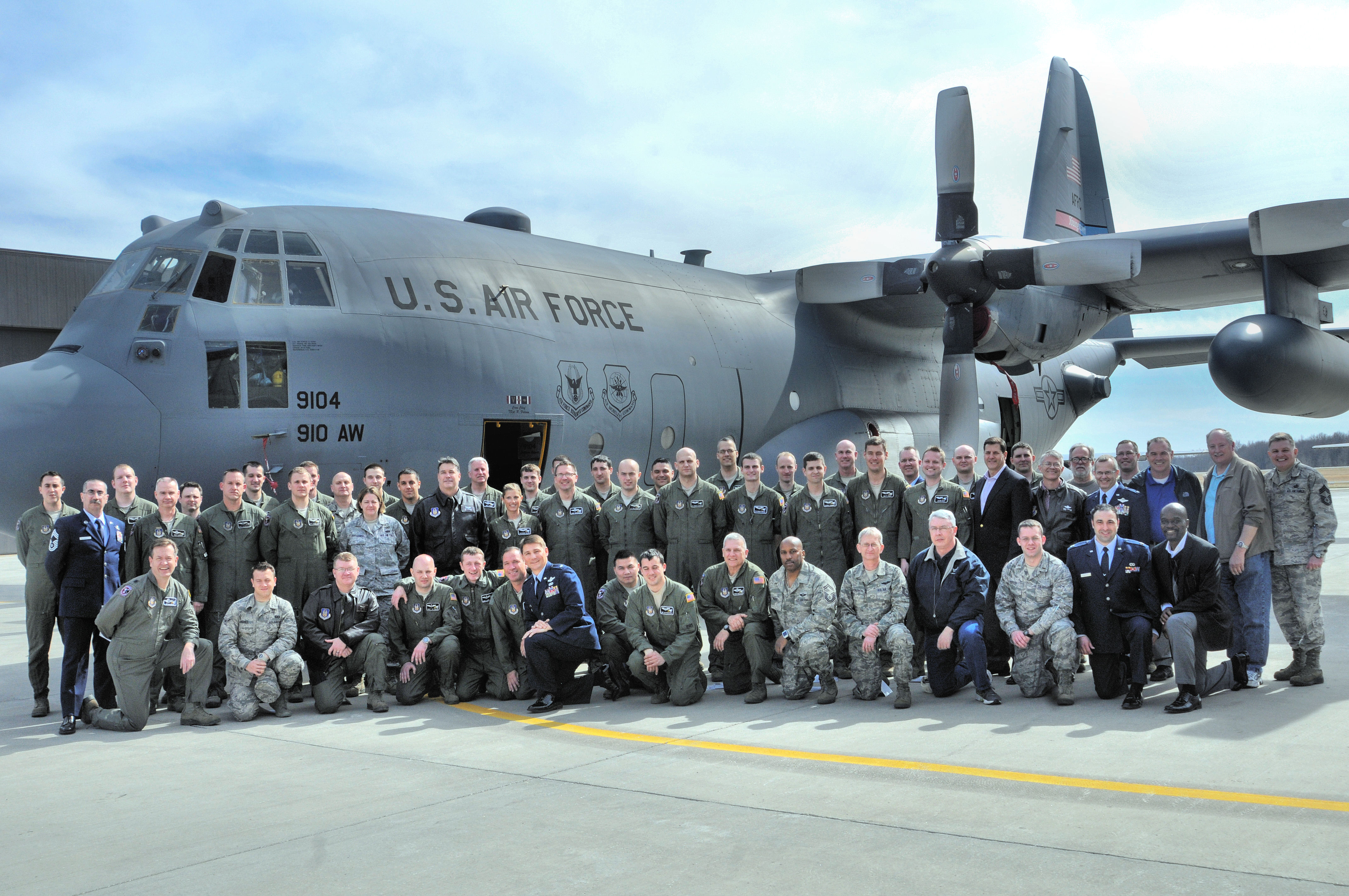
- Past and present members of the 773rd Airlift Squadron pose in front of a C-130 Hercules aircraft here, 6 April 2014 following the unit's inactivation ceremony.
- Active: 1943–1945; 1953–1971; 1972–1993; 1994–2014
- Country: United States
- Branch: United States Air Force
- Role: Airlift
- Nickname: Fleagles
- Motto: Quiet Professionals
- Engagements: Mediterranean Theater of Operations; Vietnam War
- Decorations: Distinguished Unit Citation; Air Force Outstanding Unit Award with Combat "V" Device; Air Force Outstanding Unit Award; Republic of Vietnam Gallantry Cross with Palm

Insignia
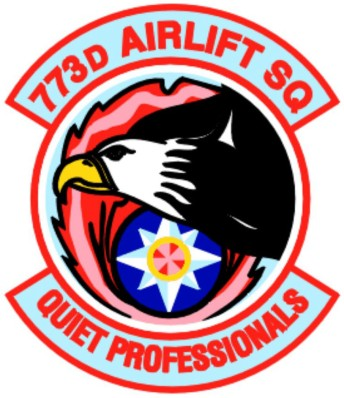
- 773rd Airlift Squadron (Note: Approved 23 December 1957. Description: Over a light turquoise blue disc edged white, bordered red, an ultramarine blue globe charged with an eight-pointed compass rose white, shaded light turquoise blue, and centered with eight alternate light and dark red segments within an Air Force golden yellow annulet, inflamed about the edges shades of red, with black outline and details, all surmounted by the head and shoulders of a black eagle issuing from sinister, his head, eyeball and highlights white, his beak Air Force golden yellow.)

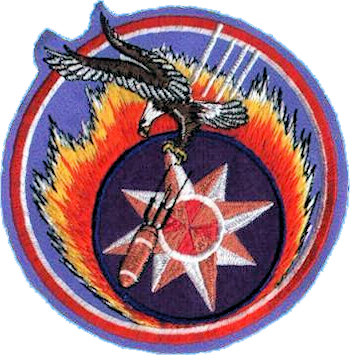
- 773rd Bombardment Squadron emblem

The 773rd Airlift Squadron called itself the "Fleagles" and was most recently assigned to the 910th Airlift Wing at Youngstown Air Reserve Station, Ohio. The unit flew the Lockheed C-130 Hercules aircraft.

The squadron was first activated as the 773rd Bombardment Squadron during World War II. After training in the United States with Boeing B-17 Flying Fortress heavy bombers, it deployed to the Mediterranean Theater of Operations, where it participated in the strategic bombing campaign against Germany, earning two Distinguished Unit Citations before inactivating in Italy.

The squadron was redesignated the 773rd Troop Carrier Squadron and activated in January 1953, when it assumed the mission, personnel and aircraft of a reserve unit that had been called to active duty for the Korean War and was being released from active duty. The squadron provided airlift for a number of contingency operations, and in 1968, moved to the Philippines, from which its crews and planes rotated to Vietnam to provide airlift support during the Vietnam War. The squadron was reactivated in the United States, where it continued airlift operations until inactivating in 1993. It was reactivated in the reserve in 1995.

== History ==
=== World War II ===
==== Training in the United States ====
The squadron was first activated as the 773rd Bombardment Squadron at Geiger Field, Washington on 1 August 1943 as one of the four original squadrons of the 463d Bombardment Group. The 773rd moved to Rapid City Army Air Base, South Dakota, where it received its initial cadre. On 1 September, the key personnel of the squadron and 463rd Group moved to Orlando Army Air Base, where they participated in advanced tactical training with the Army Air Forces School of Applied Tactics. A model crew from the squadron moved to Montbrook Army Air Field to participate in simulated missions with a Boeing B-17 Flying Fortress. The cadre returned to Rapid City at the end of the month, where the ground echelon of the squadron was filled out and ground school begun.

The squadron moved to MacDill Field, Florida in November and began flight training with the Flying Fortress, although its air echelon was not fully manned until early December. on 2 February, the squadron's ground echelon departed Florida for the port of embarkation at Camp Patrick Henry, Virginia, for shipment to the Mediterranean Theater of Operations, while the air echelon ferried their B-17s via the southern ferry route.

==== Combat in the Mediterranean Theater ====
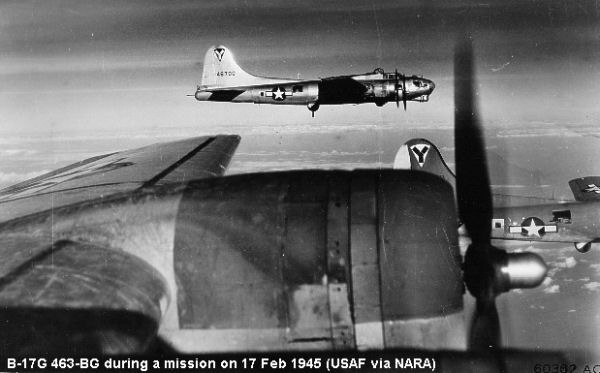
B-17 of the 463rd Group

The squadron arrived in Italy in March 1944 and flew its first combat mission from Celone Airfield on 30 March against an airfield at Imotski, Yugoslavia. It engaged primarily in the strategic bombing campaign against Germany. It attacked targets like marshalling yards, oil refineries and aircraft factories in Austria, Czechoslovakia, Germany, Greece, Romania and Yugoslavia. The squadron was awarded a Distinguished Unit Citation (DUC) for a mission against oil refineries in Ploesti, Romania on 18 May 1944. Clouds that obscured the target resulted in Fifteenth Air Force recalling the mission, but the squadron and the rest of the 463rd Group did not receive the recall message and was the only unit to continue on, causing major destruction to the target. Although crippled by intense fighter attacks, they also inflicted severe damage on the opposing air defenses. On 24 May 1945, the 463rd Group led the 5th Bombardment Wing in an attack against a Daimler-Benz tank factory at Berlin, Germany. The squadron made a successful attack despite three separate attacks by enemy air defenses, including attacks by German jet fighters. This action earned the squadron its second DUC.

The squadron was occasionally diverted from its strategic mission to perform air support and air interdiction missions. In May and June 1944, it bombed bridges to support the campaign for the liberation of Rome. In August 1944, it struck bridges, gun positions and other targets to support Operation Dragoon, the invasion of southern France. It hit military airbases, bridges and other tactical targets to support partisan forces and the Red Army advance in the Balkans. During the last months of the war, the squadron operated primarily to support Operation Grapeshot, the spring 1945 offensive in Northern Italy.

The squadron flew its final combat mission on 26 April 1945. After V-E Day the squadron transported personnel (primarily soldiers of Fifth Army) from Italy to Casablanca for return to the United States. By early September, the unit had been substantially reduced by transfers to other units and returns of personnel to the United States and it was inactivated in Italy with the end of Project Green in September 1945.

=== Airlift operations ===
==== Activation and move to Ardmore ====
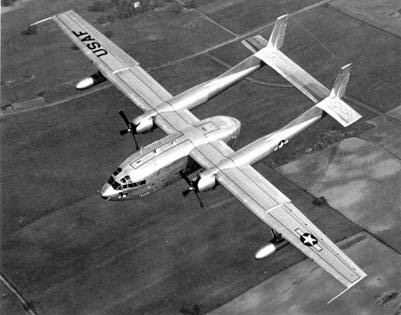
C-119 as flown by the squadron

The squadron was redesignated the 773rd Troop Carrier Squadron and activated at Memphis Municipal Airport, Tennessee, on 16 January 1953. At Memphis, it absorbed the mission, personnel and Fairchild C-119 Flying Boxcars of the 346th Troop Carrier Squadron, a reserve unit that had been mobilized for the Korean War and was being returned to the reserves. In August, the squadron departed the civilian airfield at Memphis for the newly reopened Ardmore Air Force Base, Oklahoma.

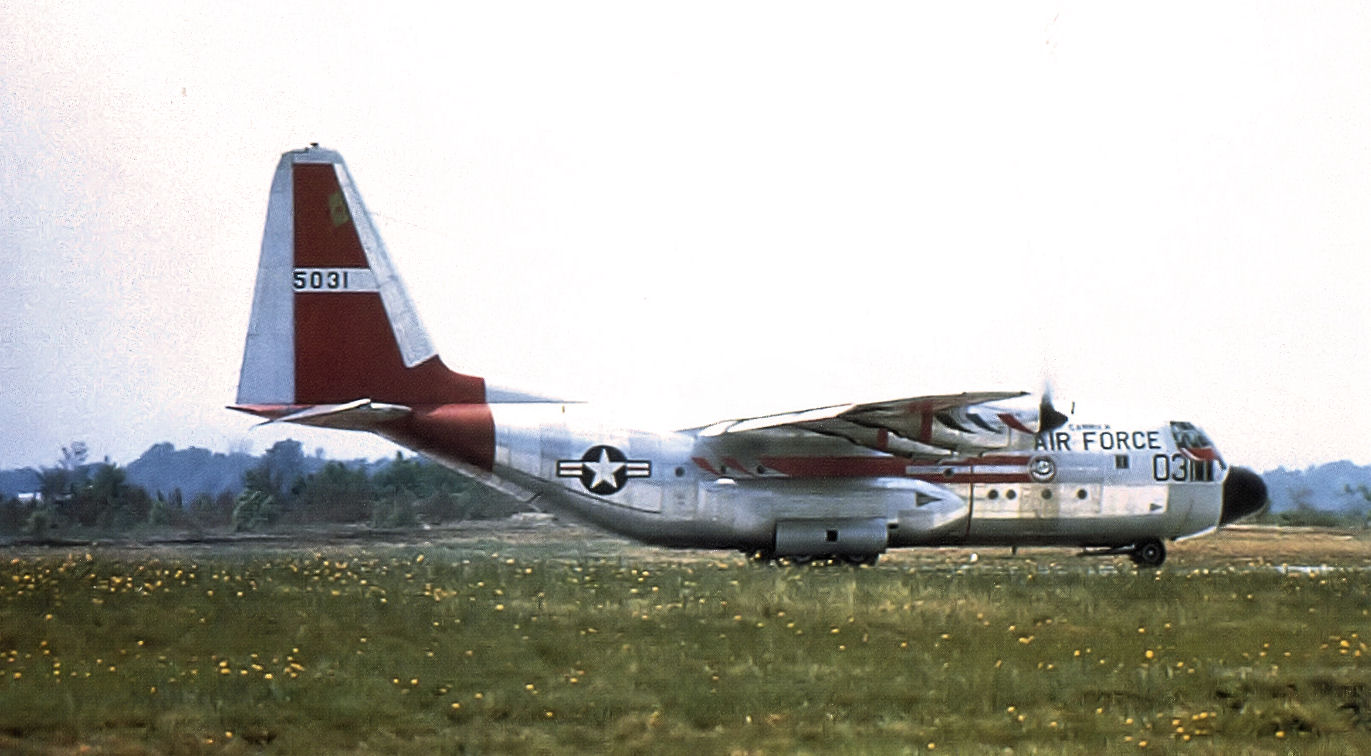
463rd Troop Carrier Wing C-130A (Note: Aircraft is Lockheed C-130A-LM Hercules, serial 55-031. This plane was converted to C-130D-LM and later transferred to the Mexican Air Force. Baugher, Joe (16 May 2023). "1955 USAF Serial Numbers". Joe Baugher. Photograph taken in 1957.)

The squadron airlifted equipment and supplies and supported Army airborne exercises. The squadron became one of the first to equip with the new Lockheed C-130A Hercules in 1956. In September 1957, Tactical Air Command (TAC) converted the 463rd Wing to the dual deputy system. (Note: Under this plan flying squadrons reported to the wing Deputy Commander for Operations and maintenance squadrons reported to the wing Deputy Commander for Maintenance.) The 463rd Group was inactivated, and the squadron was assigned directly to the 463rd Troop Carrier Wing.

In July 1958, president Camille Chamoun of Lebanon was facing an insurgency against his government and requested military assistance from the United States, which implemented Operation Blue Bat. The squadron, along with other elements of the 463rd Wing, flew command elements of Nineteenth Air Force and other personnel and equipment of the Composite Air Strike Force to locations in the Middle East. The following month, the squadron provided airlift for the 1958 Taiwan Strait Crisis.

==== Operations from Sewart and Langley ====
Although Ardmore had only been open for six years, the Air Force decided to close the base again. The inactivation of the 513th Troop Carrier Wing, a Fairchild C-123 Provider unit at Sewart Air Force Base, Tennessee, provided room for the 773rd and the other operational units of the 463rd Wing to move there. The squadron moved to Sewart in November 1958, and soon began replacing its C-130As with C-130B models. While at Sewart, the squadron provided airlift support during the Berlin Crisis of 1961. The squadron was again called on to provide emergency airlift support during the Cuban Missile Crisis in October and November 1962, transporting TAC support forces and materiel to Florida, Army units to stations in the southeastern United States and Marine reinforcements to Guantánamo Bay.

In July 1962, TAC established a Combat Crew Training School at Sewart. Starting with a single squadron, by the spring of 1963, the school had expanded to a full wing, the 4442nd Combat Crew Training Wing. As a result of the expansion of the C-130 training unit, the 463rd Wing, including the squadron, moved to Langley Air Force Base, Virginia in July 1963. From Langley, the squadron deployed crews and planes to support the US response during the Gulf of Tonkin Incident in the late summer of 1964. In late April 1965, the squadron participated in Operation Power Pack. Following a military coup in the Dominican Republic, Nineteenth Air Force formed an airlift task force to airlift the 82nd Airborne Division. On 28 and 29 April, the squadron flew C-130s to Pope Air Force Base to join the task force to transport elements of the 82nd Division to San Isidro Air Base. By September, peacekeeping functions had been transferred to Latin American counties' forces and the squadron helped return American forces to the United States.

==== Vietnam War ====
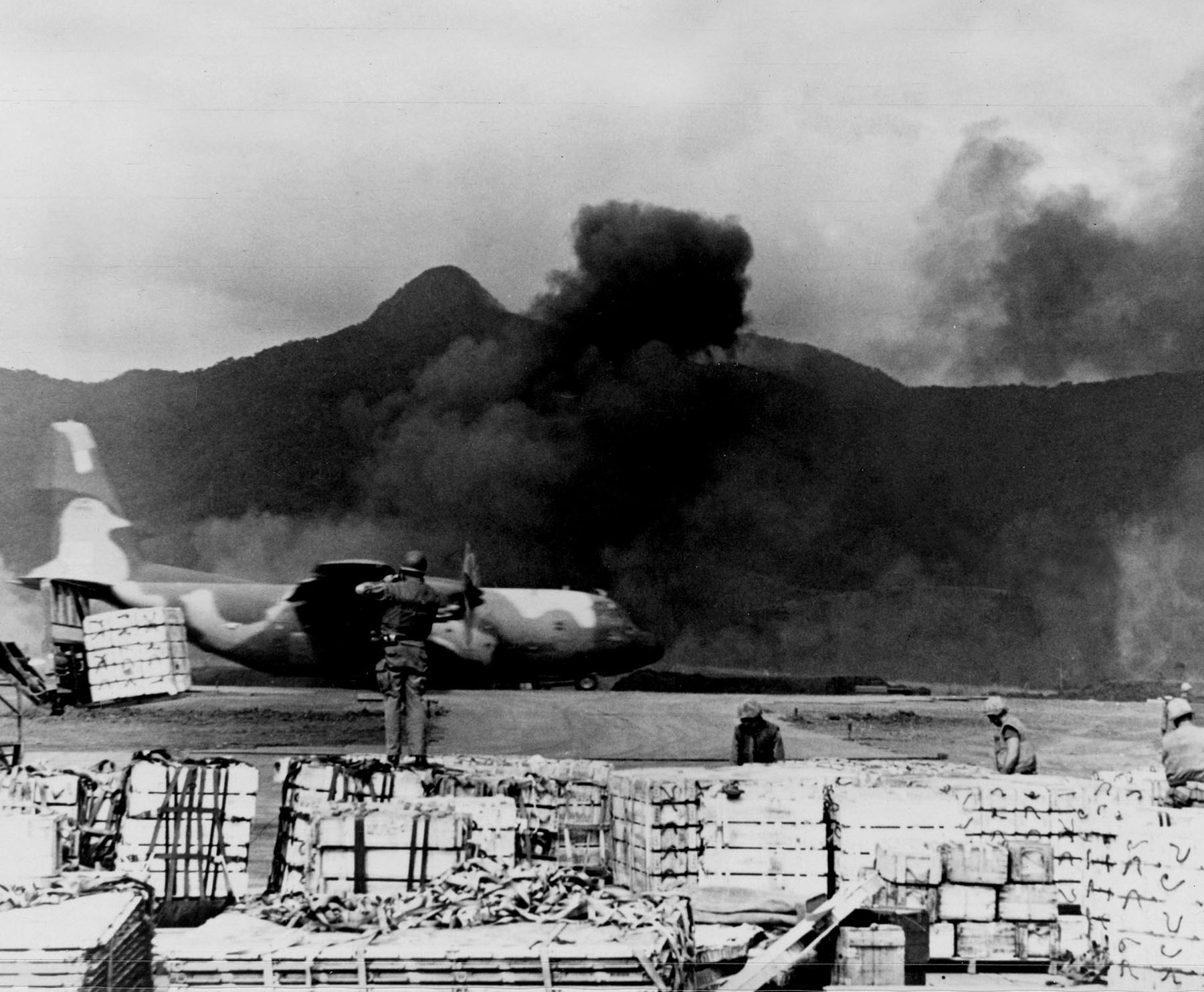
C-130 Hercules taking off from Khe Sanh 1968

While participating in Power Pack, the squadron was also deploying forces to airlift men and material to Southeast Asia. In November 1965, the 463rd Wing moved to Mactan Island Airfield, in the Philippines to provide this support full time, although the squadron moved to Clark Air Base.

The squadron deployed crews and planes operating combat airlift missions in Vietnam under the operational control of the 315th Air Division. (Note: After October 1966, 834th Air Division assumed operational control over airlift in Vietnam. Ravenstein, p. 258.) The squadron also flew aeromedical evacuation missions. In August 1967, the squadron became the 773rd Tactical Airlift Squadron, and in July 1968, the 463rd Wing moved from Mactan to Clark Air Base, joining the squadron. The 773rd became nonoperational at the middle of October 1971 and was inactivated on 31 October.

==== Operations from Dyess ====
Just under a year later, on 1 June 1972, the squadron was reactivated at Dyess Air Force Base, Texas, when it absorbed the personnel, equipment and mission of the 348th Tactical Airlift Squadron, which was inactivated. The squadron deployed as a unit frequently to Europe, where it came under the operational control of the 513th Tactical Airlift Wing in England or the 322d Tactical Airlift Wing in Germany, and later the 313th Tactical Airlift Group. It also deployed less frequently to the Pacific where it was controlled by the 374th Tactical Airlift Wing. The squadron flew humanitarian missions and participated in exercises. In November 1991, the squadron was assigned to the 463rd Operations Group and redesignated the 773rd Airlift Squadron with the implementation of the Objective Wing organization at Dyess. The squadron was inactivated and its personnel and equipment were transferred to the 40th Airlift Squadron on 1 October 1993, when all operational units at Dyess became part of the 7th Wing.

=== Reserve operations ===
On 1 April 1995, the Air Force reactivated the 773rd at Youngstown-Warren Air Reserve Station, as part of the 910th Airlift Wing. The 773rd flew numerous humanitarian missions from Europe to the former Yugoslavia; delivering peacekeeping forces, food, and medicines to aid the people of the region. The 773rd also continued rotational airlift for Central and South America, Southeast Asia and the Far East. After 2001, members of the squadron were mobilized numerous times in support of the global war on terrorism. They operated out of bases in Southwest Asia including isolated airfields in Iraq and Afghanistan to provide airlift and airdrop capability of equipment and personnel. The squadron was inactivated on 31 March 2014.

== Lineage ==
- Constituted as the 773rd Bombardment Squadron (Heavy) on 19 May 1943

Activated on 1 August 1943
Redesignated 773rd Bombardment Squadron, Heavy c. 29 September 1944
Inactivated on 25 September 1945

- Redesignated 773rd Troop Carrier Squadron, Medium on 1 December 1952

Activated on 16 January 1953
Redesignated: 773rd Troop Carrier Squadron, Assault on 18 December 1961
Redesignated: 773rd Troop Carrier Squadron, Medium on 15 May 1965
Redesignated: 773rd Troop Carrier Squadron on 1 January 1967
Redesignated: 773rd Tactical Airlift Squadron on 1 August 1967
Inactivated on 31 October 1971

- Activated on 1 June 1972

Redesignated 773rd Airlift Squadron on 1 November 1991
Inactivated on 1 October 1993

- Activated in the reserve on 1 April 1995

Inactivated on 31 March 2014

=== Assignments ===
- 463rd Bombardment Group, 1 August 1943 – 25 September 1945
- 463rd Troop Carrier Group, 16 January 1953 (attached to 463rd Troop Carrier Wing, 15 November 1954 – 19 May 1955)
- 463rd Troop Carrier Wing (later 463rd Tactical Airlift Wing), 25 September 1957 – 31 October 1971 (attached to 315th Air Division, 3 January–6 March 1961)
- 463rd Tactical Airlift Wing, 1 June 1972 (attached to 513th Tactical Airlift Wing, 1 June – 8 July 1972; 16 September – 31 October 1972; 3 July – 16 September 1973; 5 May – 17 July 1974; 3 May – 16 July 1975; 3 November 1976 – 15 January 1977; 374th Tactical Airlift Wing, 23 February – 12 March 1973; 322d Tactical Airlift Wing, (Note: Robertson says 322nd Air Division, 3 February – 9 April 1976; 3 August – 5 October 1977; 313 Tactical Airlift Group, 19 September – 1 December 1978; 3 February – 5 April 1980; 3 June – 14 August 1981, 3 October – 7 December 1982, 8 February – 10 April 1984, 6 April – 4 June 1985; 9 December 1986 – 3 February 1987, 2 February – 16 April 1988, 2 April – 14 June 1989, and 3 June – 14 August 1990).)
- 463rd Operations Group, 1 November 1991 – 1 October 1993
- 910th Operations Group, 1 April 1995 – 31 March 2014

=== Stations ===
- Geiger Field, Washington, 1 August 1943
- Rapid City Army Air Base, South Dakota, August 1943
- MacDill Field, Florida, 4 November 1943
- Drane Field, Florida, 3 January – 2 February 1944
- Morrison Field, Florida, 11 January – 4 February 1944
- Celone Airfield, Italy, 11 March 1944
- Pomigliano Airfield, Italy, 26 May 1945
- Celone Airfield, Italy, 3–25 September 1945
- Memphis Municipal Airport, Tennessee, 16 January 1953
- Ardmore Air Force Base, Oklahoma, 17 August 1953
- Sewart Air Force Base, Tennessee, 15 November 1958 (deployed at Évreux-Fauville Air Base, France, 15 Nov 1954 – 19 May 1955)
- Langley Air Force Base, Virginia, 5 July 1963 – November 1965
- Clark Air Base, Philippines, 23 November 1965 – 31 October 1971
- Dyess Air Force Base, Texas, 1 June 1972 – 1 October 1993

Deployed to RAF Mildenhall, England, 1 June – 8 July 1972, 16 September – 31 October 1972, 3 July – 16 September 1973, 5 May – 17 July 1974, and 3 May–16 July 1975, 3 November 1976 – 15 January 1977, 19 September – 1 December 1978, 3 February – 5 April 1980, 3 June – 14 August 1981, 3 October – 7 December 1982, 8 February – 10 April 1984, 6 April – 4 June 1985, 9 December 1986 – 3 February 1987, 2 February – 16 April 1988, 2 April–14 June 1989, and 3 June – 14 August 1990); Ching Chuan Kang Air Base, Taiwan, 23 February – 12 May 1973; Rhein-Main Air Base, Germany, 3 February – 9 April 1976, 3 August – 5 October 1977;

- Youngstown-Warren Air Reserve Station, Ohio, 1 April 1995 – 31 March 2014

=== Aircraft ===
- Boeing B-17 Flying Fortress, 1943–1945
- Fairchild C-119 Flying Boxcar, 1953–1957
- Lockheed C-130 Hercules, 1956–1971; 1972–1993; 1995–2014

=== Awards and campaigns ===
Award streamer	Award	Dates	Notes
	Distinguished Unit Citation	18 May 1944	Ploesti, Romania, 773rd Bombardment Squadron
	Distinguished Unit Citation	24 March 1945	Berlin, Germany, 773rd Bombardment Squadron
	Air Force Outstanding Unit Award with Combat "V" Device	1 January 1967 – 31 May 1968	773rd Troop Carrier Squadron (later 773rd Tactical Airlift Squadron)
	Air Force Outstanding Unit Award with Combat "V" Device	1 June 1968 – 30 June 1969	772nd Tactical Airlift Squadron
	Air Force Outstanding Unit Award with Combat "V" Device	1 July 1970 – 31 May 1971	773rd Tactical Airlift Squadron
	Air Force Outstanding Unit Award	15 December 1960 – 1 April 1961	773rd Troop Carrier Squadron
	Air Force Outstanding Unit Award	1 July 1964 – 15 June 1966	773rd Troop Carrier Squadron
	Air Force Outstanding Unit Award	26 November 1976 – 16 Dec 1976	773rd Tactical Airlift Squadron
	Air Force Outstanding Unit Award	1 May 1977 – 15 July 1978	773rd Tactical Airlift Squadron
	Air Force Outstanding Unit Award	16 July 1978 – 30 June 1979	773rd Tactical Airlift Squadron
	Air Force Outstanding Unit Award	1 September 1995 – 31 August 1997	773rd Airlift Squadron
	Air Force Outstanding Unit Award	1 September 2003 – 31 August 2005	773rd Airlift Squadron
	Vietnamese Gallantry Cross with Palm	1 January 1967 – 31 May 1971	773rd Troop Carrier Squadron (later 773rd Tactical Airlift Squadron)

Campaign Streamer	Campaign	Dates	Notes
	Air Offensive, Europe	11 March 1944 – 5 June 1944	773rd Bombardment Squadron
	Air Combat, EAME Theater	11 March 1944 – 11 May 1945	773rd Bombardment Squadron
	Rome-Arno	11 March – 9 September 1944	773rd Bombardment Squadron
	Central Europe	22 March 1944 – 21 May 1945	773rd Bombardment Squadron
	Normandy	6 June 1944 – 24 July 1944	773rd Bombardment Squadron
	Northern France	25 July 1944 – 14 September 1944	773rd Bombardment Squadron
	Southern France	15 August 1944 – 14 September 1944	773rd Bombardment Squadron
	North Apennines	10 September 1944 – 4 April 1945	773rd Bombardment Squadron
	Rhineland	15 September 1944 – 21 March 1945	773rd Bombardment Squadron
	Po Valley	3 April 1945 – 8 May 1945	773rd Bombardment Squadron

== See also ==
- Boeing B-17 Flying Fortress Units of the Mediterranean Theater of Operations
- List of C-130 Hercules operators
