= 772nd Expeditionary Airlift Squadron =

United States Air Force

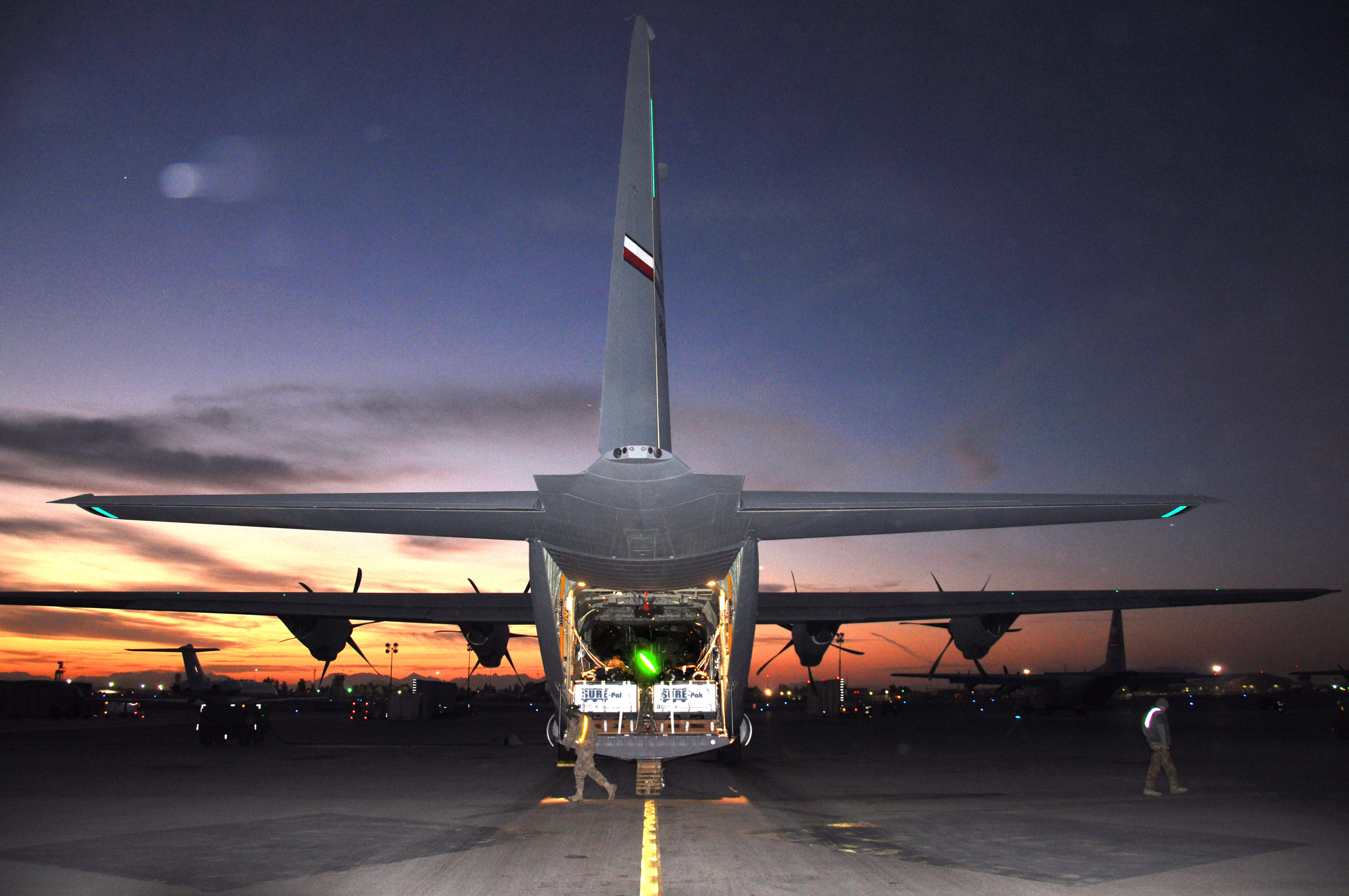
- A 772 Expeditionary Airlift Squadron C-130J at Kandahar Airfield is loaded with supplies to be airdropped 15 November 2012
- Active: 1943–1945; 1953–1971; 1972–1993; 2009-present
- Country: United States
- Branch: United States Air Force
- Role: Airlift
- Part of: Air Combat Command
- Nickname: The Hallmark Squadron (1953-1993) Gun Runners (2011- )
- Motto: If You Care Enough- Send the Best
- Engagements: Mediterranean Theater of Operations; Vietnam War; War in Afghanistan
- Decorations: Distinguished Unit Citation; Air Force Meritorious Unit Award; Air Force Outstanding Unit Award with Combat "V" Device; Air Force Outstanding Unit Award; Republic of Vietnam Gallantry Cross with Palm

Insignia
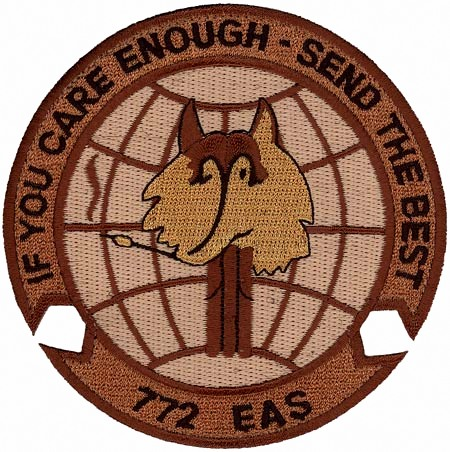
- 772nd Expeditionary Airlift Squadron emblem

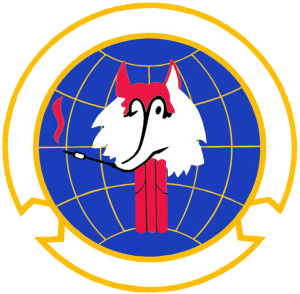
- 772d Tactical Airlift Squadron emblem (Note: Approved, 7 July 1972)

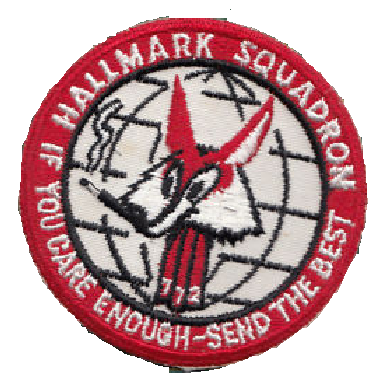
- 772d Troop Carrier Squadron emblem

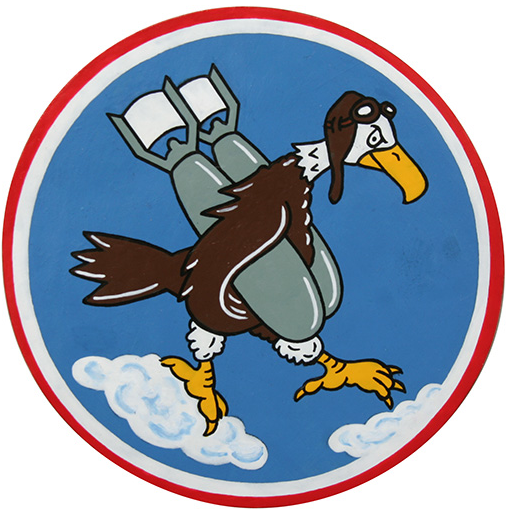
- 772d Bombardment Squadron emblem (Note: Approved 16 February 1944. Description: On a medium blue disc, wide border light red, piped white, a caricatured brown and white falcon with yellow feet and beak, wearing a tan aviator's helmet and white goggles, carrying a large light tan aerial bomb under each wing while stepping from one white cloud formation to another in base.)

The 772nd Expeditionary Airlift Squadron is a provisional United States Air Force unit, assigned to Air Combat Command to activate or inactivate as needed. Its most recent known deployment was with the 451st Air Expeditionary Wing at Kandahar Airfield, Afghanistan prior to the United States withdrawal from Afghanistan.

The squadron was first activated as the 772nd Bombardment Squadron during World War II. After training in the United States with Boeing B-17 Flying Fortress heavy bombers, it deployed to the Mediterranean Theater of Operations, where it participated in the strategic bombing campaign against Germany, earning two Distinguished Unit Citations before inactivating in Italy.

The squadron was redesignated the 772nd Troop Carrier Squadron and activated in January 1953, when it assumed the mission, personnel and aircraft of a reserve unit that had been called to active duty for the Korean War and was being released from active duty. The squadron provided airlift during a number of contingency operations, and in 1968, moved to the Philippines, from which its crews and planes rotated to Vietnam to provide airlift support during the Vietnam War. The squadron was reactivated in the United States, where it continued airlift operations until inactivating in 1993. It was converted to provisional status in 2001.

== Mission ==
The squadron provides airlift to forces engaged in the global war on terrorism. It performs airlift, airdrop, and aeromedical evacuation support for theater forces.

== History ==
=== World War II ===
==== Training in the United States ====
The squadron was first activated as the 772nd Bombardment Squadron at Geiger Field, Washington on 1 August 1943 as one of the four original squadrons of the 463d Bombardment Group. The 772nd moved to Rapid City Army Air Base, South Dakota, where it received its initial cadre. On 1 September, the key personnel of the squadron and 463d Group moved to Orlando Army Air Base, where they participated in advanced tactical training with the Army Air Forces School of Applied Tactics. A model crew from the squadron moved to Montbrook Army Air Field to participate in simulated missions with a Boeing B-17 Flying Fortress. The cadre returned to Rapid City at the end of the month, where the ground echelon of the squadron was filled out and ground school begun.

The squadron moved to MacDill Field, Florida in November and began flight training with the Flying Fortress, although its air echelon was not fully manned until early December. on 2 February, the squadron's ground echelon departed Florida for the port of embarkation at Camp Patrick Henry, Virginia, for shipment to the Mediterranean Theater of Operations, while the air echelon ferried their B-17s via the southern ferry route.

==== Combat in the Mediterranean Theater ====
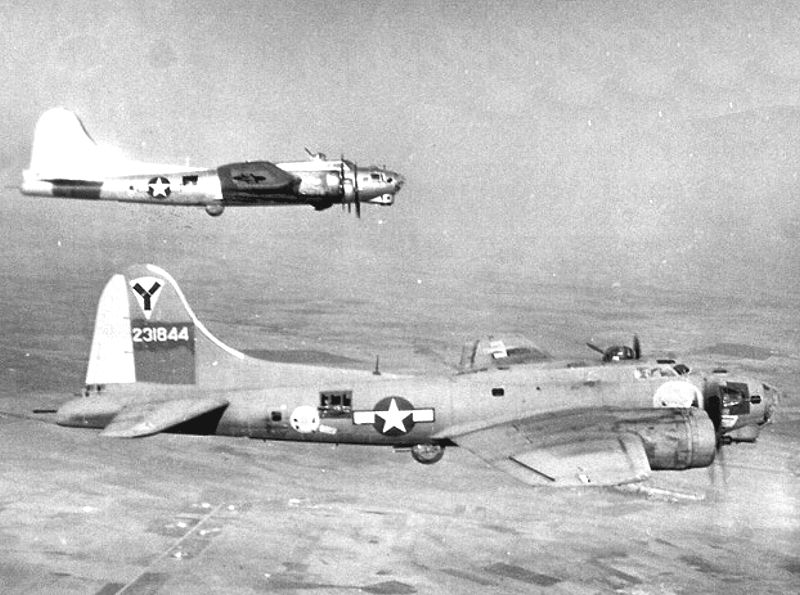
772d Bombardment Squadron B-17G Flying Fortresses in formation (Note: Aircraft in foreground is Boeing B-17G-30-BO Flying Fortress, serial 42-31844, The Swooze 1944 Model. It Flys?. This plane was salvaged on 16 May 1945. Baugher, Joe (10 April 2023). "1942 USAF Serial Numbers". Joe Baugher.)

The squadron arrived in Italy in March 1944 and flew its first combat mission from Celone Airfield on 30 March against an airfield at Imotski, Yugoslavia. It engaged primarily in the strategic bombing campaign against Germany. It attacked targets like marshalling yards, oil refineries and aircraft factories in Austria, Czechoslovakia, Germany, Greece, Romania and Yugoslavia. The squadron was awarded a Distinguished Unit Citation (DUC) for a mission against oil refineries in Ploesti, Romania on 18 May 1944. Clouds that obscured the target resulted in Fifteenth Air Force recalling the mission, but the squadron and the rest of the 463d Group did not receive the recall message and was the only unit to continue on, causing major destruction to the target. Although crippled by intense fighter attacks, the unit also inflicted severe damage on the opposing air defenses. On 24 May 1944, the 463d Group led the 5th Bombardment Wing in an attack against a Daimler-Benz tank factory at Berlin, Germany. The squadron made a successful attack despite three separate attacks by enemy air defenses, including attacks by German jet fighters. This action earned the squadron its second DUC.

The squadron was occasionally diverted from its strategic mission to perform air support and air interdiction missions. In May and June 1944, it bombed bridges to support the campaign for the liberation of Rome. In August 1944, it struck bridges, gun positions and other targets to support Operation Dragoon, the invasion of southern France. It hit military airbases, bridges and other tactical targets to support partisan forces and the Red Army advance in the Balkans. During the last months of the war the squadron operated primarily to support Operation Grapeshot, the spring 1945 offensive in Northern Italy.

The squadron flew its final combat mission on 26 April 1945. After V-E Day the squadron transported personnel (primarily soldiers of Fifth Army) from Italy to Casablanca for return to the United States. By early September, the unit had been substantially reduced by transfers to other units and returns of personnel to the United States and it was inactivated in Italy with the end of Project Green in September 1945.

=== Airlift operations ===
==== Activation and move to Ardmore ====
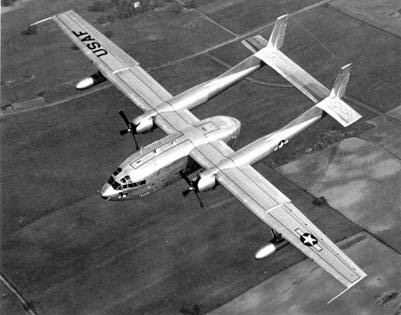
C-119 as flown by the squadron

The squadron was redesignated the 772nd Troop Carrier Squadron and activated at Memphis Municipal Airport, Tennessee on 16 January 1953. At Memphis, it absorbed the mission, personnel and Fairchild C-119 Flying Boxcars of the 345th Troop Carrier Squadron, a reserve unit that had been mobilized for the Korean War and was being returned to the reserves. In August, the squadron departed the civilian airfield at Memphis for the newly reopened Ardmore Air Force Base, Oklahoma.

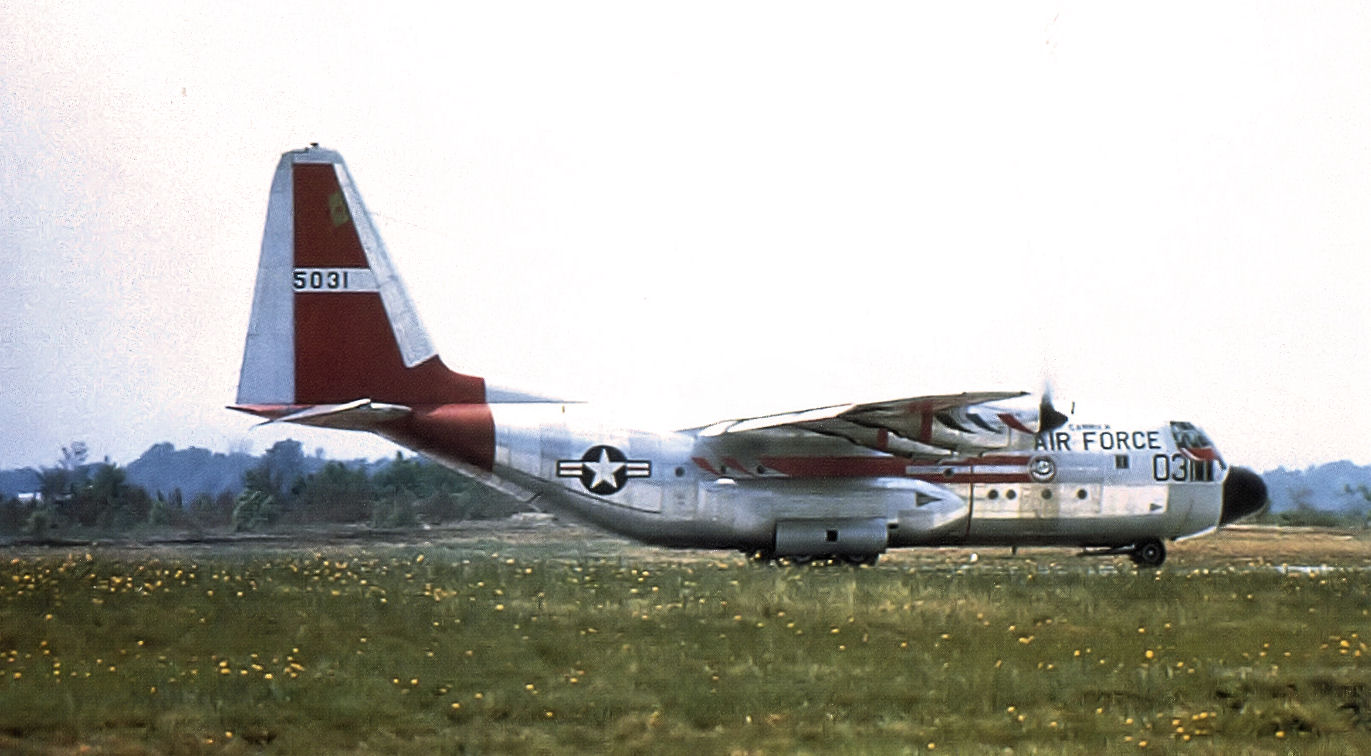
463d Troop Carrier Wing C-130A (Note: Aircraft is Lockheed C-130A-LM Hercules, serial 55-031, taken in 1957. This plane was modified to C-130D configuration and later transferred to the Mexican Air Force. Baugher, Joe (16 May 2023). "1955 USAF Serial Numbers". Joe Baugher.)

The squadron airlifted equipment and supplies and supported Army airborne exercises. The squadron became one of the first to equip with the new Lockheed C-130A Hercules in 1956. In September 1957, Tactical Air Command (TAC) converted the 463d Wing to the dual deputy system. (Note: Under this plan flying squadrons reported to the wing Deputy Commander for Operations and maintenance squadrons reported to the wing Deputy Commander for Maintenance.) The 463d Group was inactivated, and the squadron was assigned directly to the 463d Troop Carrier Wing.

In July 1958, president Camille Chamoun of Lebanon was facing an insurgency against his government and requested military assistance from the United States, which implemented Operation Blue Bat. The squadron, along with other elements of the 463d Wing, flew command elements of Nineteenth Air Force and other personnel and equipment of the Composite Air Strike Force to locations in the Middle East. The following month, the squadron provided airlift for the 1958 Taiwan Strait Crisis.

==== Operations from Sewart and Langley ====
Although Ardmore had only been open for six years, the Air Force decided to close the base again. The inactivation of the 513th Troop Carrier Wing, a Fairchild C-123 Provider unit at Sewart Air Force Base, Tennessee, provided room for the 772nd and the other operational units of the 463d Wing to move there. The squadron moved to Sewart in November 1958, and soon began replacing its C-130As with C-130B models. While at Sewart, the squadron provided airlift support during the Berlin Crisis of 1961. The squadron was again called on to provide emergency airlift support during the Cuban Missile Crisis in October and November 1962, transporting TAC support forces and materiel to Florida, Army units to stations in the southeastern United States and Marine reinforcements to Guantánamo Bay.

In July 1962, TAC established a Combat Crew Training School at Sewart. Starting with a single squadron, by the spring of 1963, the school had expanded to a full wing, the 4442d Combat Crew Training Wing. As a result of the expansion of the C-130 training unit, the 463d Wing, including the squadron, moved to Langley Air Force Base, Virginia in July 1963. From Langley, the squadron deployed crews and planes to support the US response during the Gulf of Tonkin Incident in the late summer of 1964. In late April 1965, the squadron participated in Operation Power Pack. Following a military coup in the Dominican Republic, Nineteenth Air Force formed an airlift task force to airlift the 82nd Airborne Division. On 28 and 29 April, the squadron flew C-130s to Pope Air Force Base to join the task force to transport elements of the 82nd Division to San Isidro Air Base. By September, peacekeeping functions had been transferred to Latin American countries' forces and the squadron helped return American forces to the United States.

==== Vietnam War ====
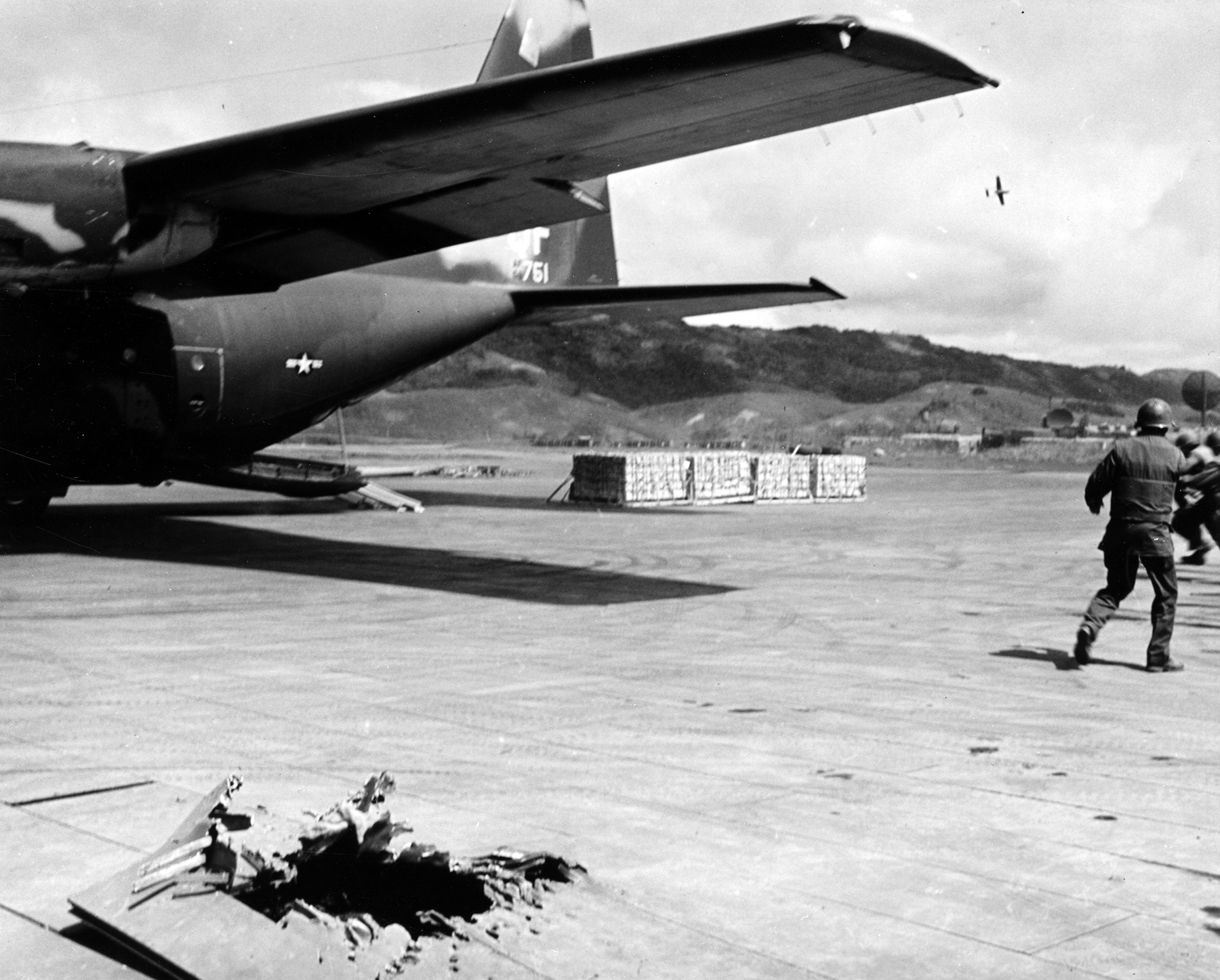
Squadron C-130B being unloaded at Khe Sanh 1968 (Note: Aircraft is Lockheed C-130B-LM Hercules, serial 58-0751. This plane later served with the Air National Guard. It was transferred to the Aerospace Maintenance and Regeneration Center, then to the Tunisian Air Force. Baugher, Joe (11 June 2023). "1958 USAF Serial Numbers". Joe Baugher.)

While participating in Power Pack, the squadron was also deploying forces to airlift men and material to Southeast Asia. In November 1965, the 463d Wing moved to Mactan Island Airfield, in the Philippines to provide this support full-time. The squadron was the last element of the wing to move, remaining at Langley, where it was briefly assigned to the 840th Air Division until February 1966, when it joined the wing in the Philippines.

The squadron deployed crews and planes operating combat airlift missions in Vietnam under the operational control of the 315th Air Division. (Note: After October 1966, 834th Air Division assumed operational control over airlift in Vietnam. Ravenstein, p. 258.) The squadron also flew aeromedical evacuation missions. In August 1967, the squadron became the 772nd Tactical Airlift Squadron, and in July 1968, it moved from Mactan to Clark Air Base. The 772nd became nonoperational at the beginning of June 1971 and was inactivated on 15 June.

==== Operations from Dyess ====
Just under a year later, on 1 June 1972, the squadron was reactivated at Dyess Air Force Base, Texas, when it absorbed the personnel, equipment and mission of the 347th Tactical Airlift Squadron, which was inactivated. The squadron deployed as a unit frequently to Europe, where it came under the operational control of the 513th Tactical Airlift Wing in England or the 322d Tactical Airlift Wing in Germany, and later the 313th Tactical Airlift Group. It also deployed less frequently to the Pacific where it was controlled by the 374th Tactical Airlift Wing. The squadron flew humanitarian missions and participated in exercises. In November 1991, the squadron was assigned to the 463d Operations Group and redesignated the 772nd Airlift Squadron with the implementation of the Objective Wing organization at Dyess. The squadron was inactivated and its personnel and equipment were transferred to the 39th Airlift Squadron on 1 October 1993, when all operational units at Dyess became part of the 7th Wing.

=== Expeditionary operations ===
The squadron was converted to provisional status as the 772nd Expeditionary Airlift Squadron in 2001 and assigned to Air Combat Command to activate or inactivate as needed. It was active at Kandahar Airfield, Afghanistan, operating with C-130Js and aircrews deployed from active, reserve, and Air National Guard units. The squadron was responsible for the majority of airlift missions in Afghanistan in the early 2010s, averaging 50 sorties a day and regularly setting records for the most airdrops in a month. In April 2013, the squadron was the first Air Force unit to make an airdrop using the Extracted Container Delivery System, a system that pulls bundles out of the aircraft at a faster rate than the earlier airdrop process, which improves the overall accuracy of the drop itself.

== Lineage ==
- Constituted as the 772d Bombardment Squadron (Heavy) on 19 May 1943

Activated on 1 August 1943
Redesignated 772d Bombardment Squadron, Heavy c. 29 September 1944
Inactivated on 25 September 1945

- Redesignated 772d Troop Carrier Squadron, Medium on 1 December 1952

Activated on 16 January 1953
Redesignated: 772d Troop Carrier Squadron, Assault on 18 December 1961
Redesignated: 772d Troop Carrier Squadron, Medium on 15 May 1965
Redesignated: 772d Troop Carrier Squadron on 1 January 1967
Redesignated: 772d Tactical Airlift Squadron on 1 August 1967
Inactivated on 15 June 1971

- Activated on 1 June 1972

Redesignated 772d Airlift Squadron on 1 November 1991
Inactivated on 1 October 1993

- Redesignated 772d Expeditionary Airlift Squadron and converted to provisional status on 4 December 2001

Activated by 1 March 2002
Inactivated after 31 May 2003
Activated 2009
Inactivated unknown

=== Assignments ===
- 463d Bombardment Group, 1 August 1943 – 25 September 1945
- 463d Troop Carrier Group, 16 January 1953
- 463d Troop Carrier Wing, 25 September 1957
- 840th Air Division, 23 November 1965
- 463d Troop Carrier Wing (later 463d Tactical Airlift Wing), 7 February 1966 – 15 June 1971
- 463d Tactical Airlift Wing, 1 June 1972

Attached to: 513th Tactical Airlift Wing, 9 July–15 September 1972 and 10 November 1972 – 10 January 1973, 5 January–15 March 1975 and 3 November 1975 – 15 January 1976; 374th Tactical Airlift Wing, 6 May–4 June 1973; 322d Tactical Airlift Wing, 5 February–8 April 1974, 3 August–15 October 1976; 313th Tactical Airlift Group, 3 November 1977 – 7 January 1978, 3 April–5 June 1979, 3 August–5 October 1980, 3 December 1981 – 13 February 1982, 4 April–7 June 1983; 5 June–4 August 1984; 10 October–7 December 1985, 4 June–12 August 1987, 4 August–13 October 1988, and 4 October–12 December 1989

- 463d Operations Group, 1 November 1991 – 1 October 1993
- Air Combat Command to activate or inactivate at any time after 4 December 2001

Unknown 1 March 2002 – 31 May 2003
451st Air Expeditionary Wing, 2009 – unknown

=== Stations ===
- Geiger Field, Washington, 1 August 1943
- Rapid City Army Air Base, South Dakota, August 1943
- MacDill Field, Florida, 4 November 1943
- Drane Field, Florida, 3 January–2 February 1944
- Morrison Field, Florida, 11–14 February 1944
- Celone Airfield, Italy, 11 March 1944
- Pomigliano Airfield, Italy, 26 May 1945
- Celone Airfield, Italy, 3–25 September 1945
- Memphis Municipal Airport, Tennessee, 16 January 1953
- Ardmore Air Force Base, Oklahoma, 17 August 1953
- Sewart Air Force Base, Tennessee, 15 November 1958
- Langley Air Force Base, Virginia, 5 July 1963 – 7 February 1966
- Mactan Island Airfield, Philippines, 12 February 1966
- Clark Air Base, Philippines, 15 July 1968 – 15 June 1971
- Dyess Air Force Base, Texas, 1 June 1972 – 1 October 1993

Deployed to RAF Mildenhall, England, 9 July–15 September 1972, 10 November 1972 – 10 January 1973, 5 January–15 March 1975, 3 November 1975 – 15 January 1976, 3 November 1977 – 7 January 1978, 3 April–5 June 1979, 3 August–5 October 1980, 3 December 1981 – 13 February 1982, 4 April–7 June 1983, 5 June–4 August 1984, 10 October–7 December 1985, 4 June–12 August 1987, and 4 October–12 December 1989; Ching Chuan Kang Air Base, Taiwan, 6 May–4 June 1973; Rhein Main Air Base, West Germany, 5 February–8 April 1974, 3 August–15 October 1976; RAF Sculthorpe, England, 4 August – 13 October 1988

- Unknown 1 March 2002 – 31 May 2003
- Kandahar Airfield, Afghanistan, 2009 – unknown

=== Aircraft ===
- Boeing B-17 Flying Fortress, 1943–1945
- Fairchild C-119 Flying Boxcar, 1953–1957
- Lockheed C-130 Hercules, 1956–1971; 1972–1993, 2002–2003; 2009–unknown

=== Awards and campaigns ===
Award streamer	Award	Dates	Notes
	Distinguished Unit Citation	18 May 1944	Ploesti, Romania, 772d Bombardment Squadron
	Distinguished Unit Citation	24 March 1945	Berlin, Germany, 772d Bombardment Squadron
	Air Force Meritorious Unit Award	6 January 2011-31 January 2012	772d Expeditionary Airlift Squadron
	Air Force Meritorious Unit Award	1 February 2012-31 January 2013	772d Expeditionary Airlift Squadron
	Air Force Outstanding Unit Award with Combat "V" Device	1 January 1967-31 May 1968	772d Troop Carrier Squadron (later 772d Tactical Airlift Squadron)
	Air Force Outstanding Unit Award with Combat "V" Device	1 June 1968-30 June 1969	772d Tactical Airlift Squadron
	Air Force Outstanding Unit Award with Combat "V" Device	1 July 1970-31 May 1971	772d Tactical Airlift Squadron
	Air Force Outstanding Unit Award with Combat "V" Device	1 March 2002-31 May 2003	772d Expeditionary Airlift Squadron
	Air Force Outstanding Unit Award	15 December 1960-1 April 1961	772d Troop Carrier Squadron
	Air Force Outstanding Unit Award	1 July 1964-22 November 1965; 7 February 1966-15 June 1966	772d Troop Carrier Squadron
	Air Force Outstanding Unit Award	1 May 1977-15 July 1978	772d Tactical Airlift Squadron
	Air Force Outstanding Unit Award	16 July 1978-30 June 1979	772d Tactical Airlift Squadron
	Air Force Outstanding Unit Award	1 March 1981-30 April 1982	772d Tactical Airlift Squadron
	Vietnamese Gallantry Cross with Palm	1 January 1967-31 May 1971	772d Troop Carrier Squadron (later 772d Tactical Airlift Squadron)

Campaign Streamer	Campaign	Dates	Notes
	Air Offensive, Europe	11 March 1944 – 5 June 1944	772d Bombardment Squadron
	Air Combat, EAME Theater	11 March 1944 – 11 May 1945	772d Bombardment Squadron
	Rome-Arno	11 March–9 September 1944	772d Bombardment Squadron
	Central Europe	22 March 1944 – 21 May 1945	772d Bombardment Squadron
	Normandy	6 June 1944 – 24 July 1944	772d Bombardment Squadron
	Northern France	25 July 1944 – 14 September 1944	772d Bombardment Squadron
	Southern France	15 August 1944 – 14 September 1944	772d Bombardment Squadron
	North Apennines	10 September 1944 – 4 April 1945	772d Bombardment Squadron
	Rhineland	15 September 1944 – 21 March 1945	772d Bombardment Squadron
	Po Valley	3 April 1945 – 8 May 1945	772d Bombardment Squadron
	Consolidation II	unknown–30 November 2006	772d Expeditionary Airlift Squadron
	Consolidation III	1 December 2006–unknown	772d Expeditionary Airlift Squadron

== See also ==
- Boeing B-17 Flying Fortress Units of the Mediterranean Theater of Operations
- List of C-130 Hercules operators
