= 463rd Operations Group =

463rd Operations Group

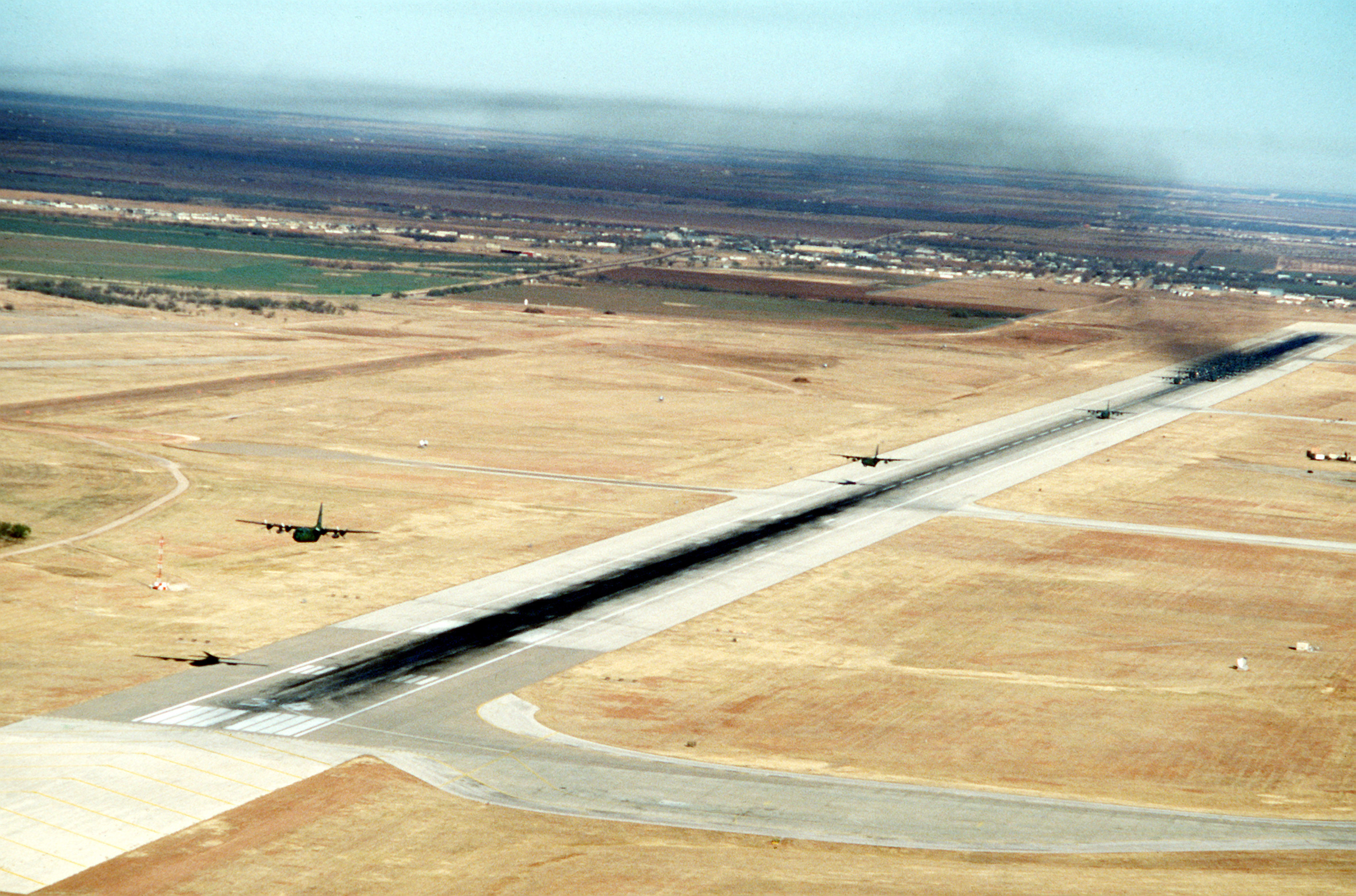
- 463rd C-130 Hercules aircraft on a Minimum Interval Takeoff at the start of a mass airdrop exercise at Dyess
- Active: 1943–1945; 1953–1957; 1991–1993
- Country: United States
- Branch: United States Air Force
- Role: Airlift
- Part of: Air Mobility Command
- Nickname: The Swoose Group (World War II)
- Motto: Turris in Coelis Latin Fortress in the Sky (World War II)
- Decorations: Distinguished Unit Citation Air Force Outstanding Unit Award

Insignia
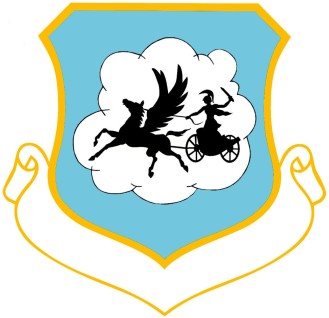
- 463rd Operations Group emblem

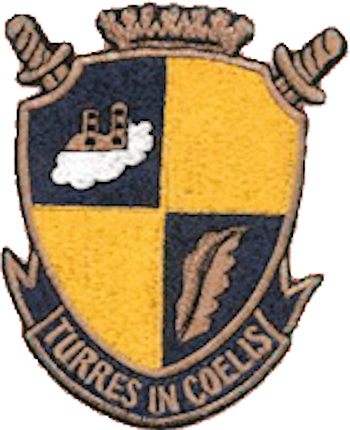
- 463rd Bombardment Group emblem
- World War II tail marking: Y on an inverted, arced triangle, yellow rudder

The United States Air Force's 463rd Operations Group was a tactical airlift unit last stationed at Dyess Air Force Base, Texas. It was inactivated on 1 October 1993.

During World War II as the 463rd Bombardment Unit, it was second-to-last B-17 Flying Fortress heavy bomber group trained in the United States. It was deployed to Southern Italy as part of the Fifteenth Air Force in March 1944.

== History ==
=== World War II ===
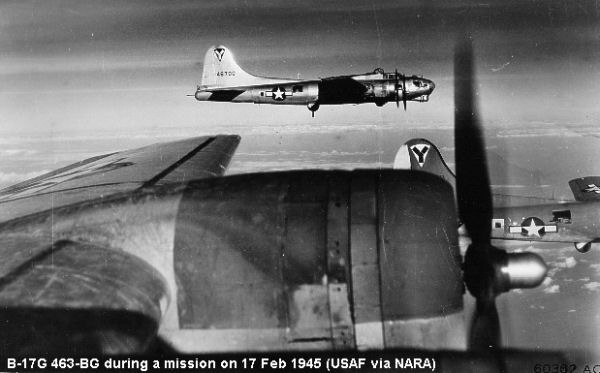
B-17s of the 463rd Bomb Group in formation Douglas/Long Beach B-17G-60-DL Flying Fortress 44-6700 identifiable.

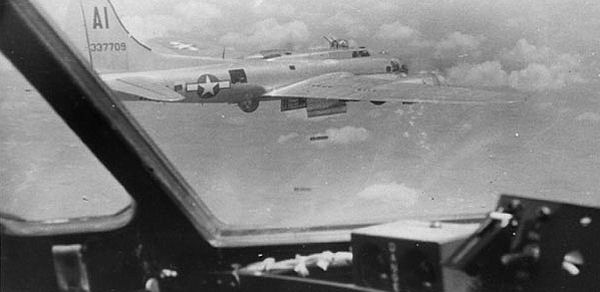
Boeing TB-17G-70-BO Fortress 43-37709 assigned to Avon Park AAF as a combat crew trainer

Constituted as 463rd Bombardment Group (Heavy) on 19 May 1943. Activated on 1 August 1943. Trained with Boeing B-17 Flying Fortresses for duty overseas. Moved to Italy, February–March 1944, and assigned to Fifteenth Air Force. Operational squadrons were the 772nd, 773rd, 774th and 775th Bombardment Squadrons.

Entered combat on 30 March 1944 and operated chiefly against strategic objectives. Attacked such targets as marshaling yards, oil refineries, and aircraft factories in Italy, Germany, Austria, Czechoslovakia, Romania, Yugoslavia, and Greece.

The group received a Distinguished Unit Citation for bombing oil refineries in Ploiești on 18 May 1944: when clouds limited visibility to such an extent that other groups turned back, the 463rd proceeded to Ploiești and, though crippled by opposition from interceptors and flak, rendered destructive blows to both the target and the enemy fighters.

Received a second Distinguished Unit Citation for leading the wing through three damaging enemy attacks to bomb tank factories in Berlin on 24 March 1945. Also engaged interdiction and support missions. Bombed bridges during May and June 1944 in the campaign for the liberation of Rome.

Participated in the invasion of Southern France in August 1944 by striking bridges, gun positions, and other targets. Hit communications such as railroad bridges, marshalling yards, and airdromes in the Balkans. Operated primarily against communications in northern Italy during March and April 1945.

The "Swoose" Group was commanded by Col. Frank Kurtz, a pre-war Olympic swimmer and pilot of the famed B-17 "The Swoose" in the Pacific during 1941–42.

After V-E Day, transported personnel from Italy to Casablanca for return to the US. Inactivated in Italy on 25 September 1945. Flew 222 combat missions; 91 aircraft lost.

=== Cold War ===
The group was redesignated 463rd Troop Carrier Group in 1952 and activated at Memphis Airport, Tennessee on 16 January 1953. The group was assigned to the 463rd Troop Carrier Wing and equipped with Fairchild C-119 Flying Boxcars. It received its personnel and aircraft from the 516th Troop Carrier Group, a reserve unit that had been called to active duty for the Korean War, which was simultaneously inactivated. On 1 September, the wing moved to Ardmore Air Force Base, Oklahoma. In 1957 it began replacing its C-119s with the new Lockheed C-130A Hercules turboprop transport. In September 1957 the group was inactivated and its squadrons assigned directly to the 463rd Wing.

The group was redesignated 463rd Operations Group and reactivated at Dyess Air Force Base, Texas in November 1991 as part of the Air Force's Objective Wing reorganization. The group was inactivated on 1 October 1993 and its personnel and equipment were transferred to the incoming 7th Operations Group

== Lineage ==
- Constituted as the 463rd Bombardment Group (Heavy) on 19 May 1943

Activated on 1 August 1943
Redesignated 463rd Bombardment Group, Heavy on 29 September 1944
Inactivated on 25 September 1945

- Redesignated 463rd Troop Carrier Group, Medium on 1 December 1952

Activated on 16 January 1953
Inactivated 25 September 1957

- Redesignated 463rd Tactical Airlift Group on 31 July 1985
- Redesignated 463rd Operations Group

Activated on 1 November 1991
Inactivated on 1 October 1993

=== Assignments ===
- Fourth Air Force, 1 August – 5 November 1943
- Third Air Force, 5 November 1943 – 1 February 1944
- 5th Bombardment Wing, 9 March 1944 – 25 September 1945
- 463rd Troop Carrier Wing, 16 January 1953 – 25 September 1957
- 463rd Airlift Wing, 1 November 1991 – 1 October 1993

=== Components ===
- 772nd Bombardment Squadron (later 772nd Troop Carrier Squadron, 772nd Airlift Squadron): 1 August 1943 – 25 September 1945; 16 January 1953 – 25 September 1957, 1 November 1991 – 1 October 1993
- 773rd Bombardment Squadron (later 773d Troop Carrier Squadron, 773rd Airlift Squadron): 1 August 1943 – 25 September 1945; 16 January 1953 – 25 September 1957, 1 November 1991 – 1 October 1993
- 774th Bombardment Squadron (later 772nd Troop Carrier Squadron, 774th Airlift Squadron): 1 August 1943 – 25 September 1945; 16 January 1953 – 25 September 1957, 1 November 1991 – 1 October 1993
- 775th Bombardment Squadron (later 775th Troop Carrier Squadron): 1 August 1943 – 25 September 1945; 8 June 1955 – 1 August 1957

=== Stations ===
- Geiger Field, Washington, 1 August 1943
- Rapid City Army Air Base, South Dakota, August 1943
- MacDill Field, Florida, 5 November 1943
- Lakeland Army Air Field, Florida, 1 January – February 1944
- Celone Airfield, Italy 9 March 1944 – 25 September 1945
- Memphis Municipal Airport, Tennessee, 16 January 1953
- Ardmore Air Force Base, Oklahoma, 1 September 1953 – 25 September 1957
- Dyess Air Force Base, Texas, 1 November 1991 – 1 October 1993

=== Aircraft ===
- Boeing B-17 Flying Fortress (1943–1945)
- Curtiss C-46 Commando (1953)
- Fairchild C-119 Flying Boxcar (1953–1957)
- Chase YC-122 Avitruc (1955)
- Fairchild C-123B Provider (1955–1957)
- Lockheed C-130A Hercules (1956–1957)
