= 316th Wing =

Active wing of the United States Air Force

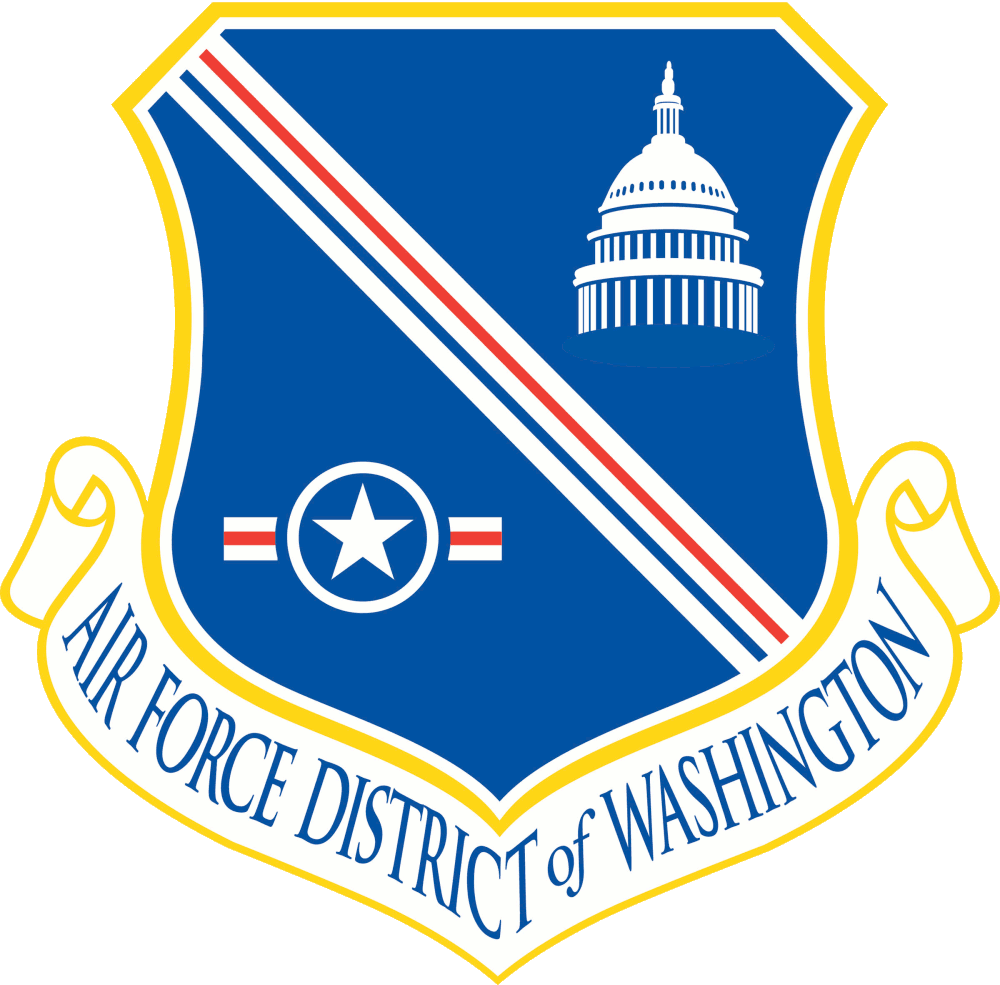
316th Wing

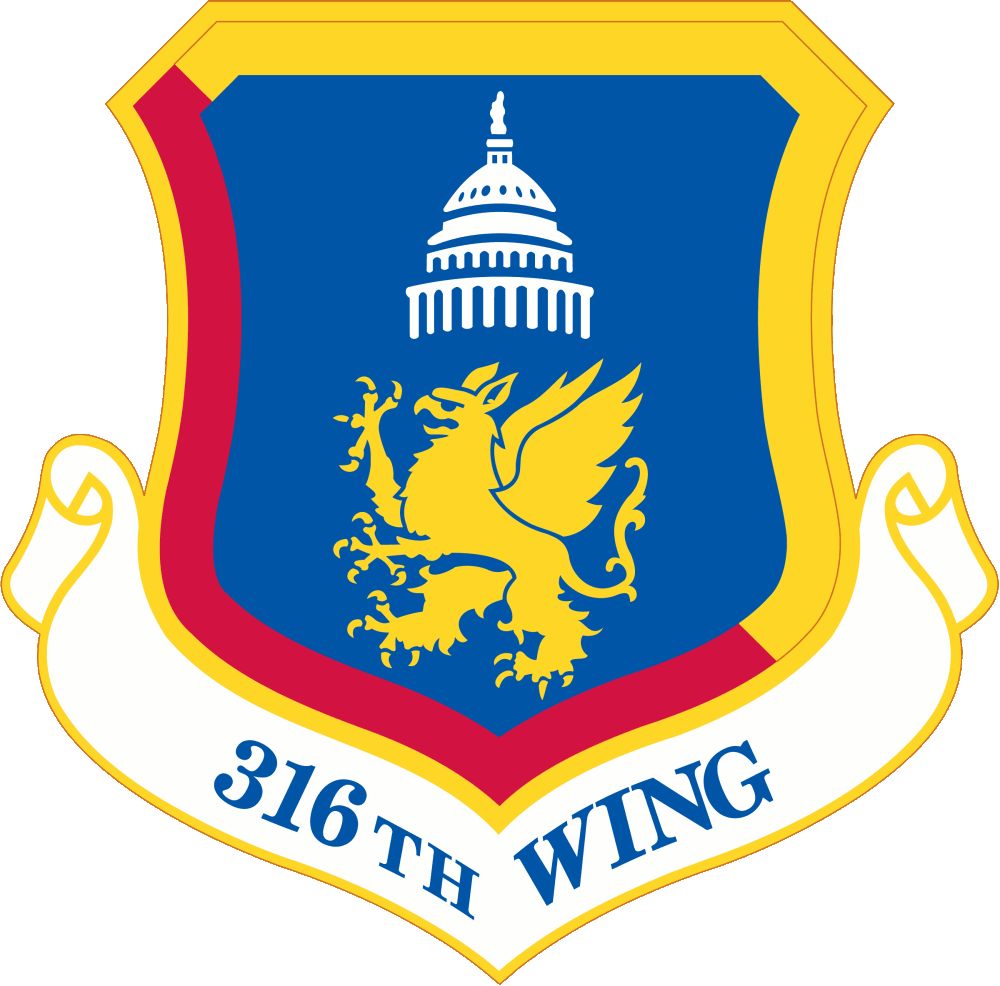
- Wing emblem
- Active: 1947–1949; 1966–1975; 1980–1991; 2006–2010; 2020–present
- Country: United States
- Branch: United States Air Force
- Type: Air base wing
- Role: Installation management; Helicopter airlift
- Part of: Air Force District of Washington
- Garrison/HQ: Joint Base Andrews, Maryland
- Motto: America's airfield
- Decorations: Air Force Outstanding Unit Award; Navy Presidential Unit Citation
- Website: Official website

Commanders
- Current commander: Colonel Karl W. Seekamp

Aircraft flown
- Utility helicopter: UH-1N Twin Huey

The 316th Wing is an active wing of the United States Air Force. It is the host wing at Joint Base Andrews Naval Air Facility, Maryland. As host wing, the 316 WG operates, administers and maintains the base. The 316th Wing was activated on June 11, 2020, becoming the host wing for JBA and taking on the airmen and units of the 11th Wing.

The wing's operations group was a highly decorated Douglas C-47 Skytrain unit that served with Ninth Air Force and Twelfth Air Force in the European Theater of Operations and the Mediterranean theaters during World War II.

The wing's officially stated mission is "Respond, Honor, Defend, Support and Care...to project airpower and diplomacy from America's Airfield".

== Overview ==
As the host wing for Joint Base Andrews, Md., the 316th Wing is responsible for maintaining emergency reaction rotary-wing airlift and other National Capital Region contingency response capabilities critical to national security and for organizing, training, equipping and deploying combat-ready forces for Air and Space Expeditionary Forces (AEFs). The 316th Wing also provides installation security, services and airfield management to support the President, Vice President, other U.S. senior leaders and more than 50 tenant organizations and federal agencies.

The 316th Wing provides security, personnel, contracting, finance and infrastructure support for 5 Wings, 3 Headquarters, more than 80 tenant organizations, 148 geographically separated units, 6,500 Airmen in the Pentagon, and 60,000 Airmen and families in the national capital region and around the world. The 316th Wing supports contingency operations in the nation's capital with immediate response rotary-assets. It also provides security for the world's highest visibility flight line and is responsible for ceremonial support with the United States Air Force Band, Honor Guard and Air Force Arlington Chaplaincy.

== History ==
The wing was originally established as the 316th Troop Carrier Wing in 1947 at the former Greenville Air Force Base, South Carolina, primarily operating the Douglas C-47 Skytrain and Fairchild C-82 Packet. It was subsequently inactivated in 1949. In 1966, the unit was reactivated at Langley Air Force Base, Virginia as the 316th Tactical Airlift Wing of the Tactical Air Command (TAC). The 316 TAW conducted Lockheed C-130 Hercules replacement training from January 1966 to November 1967 and C-130 maintenance training from February to December 1966. In late 1967, the 316 TAW relinquished its training mission and became a typical operational tactical airlift wing with the C-130E Hercules. As an operational wing, the organization operated three tactical airlift squadrons in addition to its various maintenance and support squadrons.

The 316 TAW participated in joint airborne training, glider training, exercises maneuvers, and ferried freight in the United States and overseas. It also participated in worldwide tactical airlift operations, humanitarian missions, and special exercises and maneuvers, including joint airborne training. In 1973, the wing also participated in repatriation of South Vietnamese and American prisoners of war from North Vietnam.

In 1975, all tactical airlift assets in TAC were transferred to the Military Airlift Command (MAC). With TAC Headquarters being at Langley, and with the pending arrival of the 1st Tactical Fighter Wing and the first operational McDonnell F-15 Eagles at Langley, MAC and TAC agreed to inactivate the 316 TAW and two of its three tactical airlift squadrons. All of the wing's C-130 aircraft assets were redistributed to other C-130 wings with the exception of the 36th Tactical Airlift Squadron, which was reassigned with its personnel and C-130E aircraft to the 62d Military Airlift Wing, a then-Lockheed C-141 Starlifter strategic airlift wing at McChord Air Force Base, Washington in the summer of 1975.

From 1980 to 1991, the 1776th Air Base Wing was the host wing that operated, administered and maintained Andrews Air Force Base, Maryland for all its tenant commands. The 1776 ABW was consolidated with the newly established 316th Wing on 21 June 2006. In addition to base operations and support of Andrews, the 316 WG also operated Bell UH-1N Twin Huey aircraft for quick-reaction rotary-wing airlift in the National Capital Region. Upon the recommendation of Base Realignment and Closure, 2005, the 11th Wing of Bolling Air Force Base merged with the 316th Wing and was redesignated the 11th Wing at Joint Base Andrews Naval Air Facility.

In June 2020, the Air Force and Navy agreed to transfer control of Joint Base Anacostia Bolling from the Navy to the Air Force, based on the predominance of Air Force 'mission sets" at the joint base. in connection with this transfer, the 11th Wing moved to Anacostia Bolling to assume responsibilities there. The 316th Wing was reactivated on 12 June 2020 and assumed the 11th Wing's responsibilities at Andrews.

== Units ==
316th Operations Group

- 1st Helicopter Squadron
- 5th Helicopter Squadron (squadron activates on 27 August 2026)
- 316th Operations Support Squadron

316th Mission Support Group

- 316th Civil Engineer Squadron
- 316th Contracting Squadron
- 316th Logistics Readiness Squadron
- 316th Force Support Squadron

316th Security Forces Group

- 316th Security Forces Squadron
- 816th Security Forces Squadron
- 316th Security Support Squadron

316th Medical Group

- 316th Dental Squadron
- 316th Medical Squadron
- 316th Medical Support Squadron
- 316th Medical Operations Squadron
- 316th Aerospace Medical Squadron
- 316th Surgical Squadron

== Lineage ==
- Established as 316th Troop Carrier Wing on 29 July 1947

Organized on 15 August 1947
Discontinued on 25 August 1948

- Redesignated 316th Troop Carrier Wing, Medium and activated on 23 August 1948

Inactivated on 20 October 1949

- Redesignated 316th Troop Carrier Wing, Assault and activated, on 15 November 1965

Organized on 25 November 1965
Redesignated: 316th Troop Carrier Wing on 1 March 1966
Redesignated: 316th Tactical Airlift Wing on 1 May 1967
Inactivated on 1 October 1975

- Consolidated (21 June 2006) with 1776th Air Base Wing which activated on 15 December 1980

Inactivated on 12 July 1991

- Redesignated 316th Wing on 21 June 2006

Activated on 22 June 2006
Inactivated on 30 September 2010

- Activated on 12 June 2020

=== Assignments ===
- Ninth Air Force, 15 August 1947 – 25 August 1948; 23 August 1948
- Fourteenth Air Force, 1 February-20 October 1949
- Tactical Air Command, 15 November 1965
- 840th Air Division, 25 November 1965
- Ninth Air Force, 24 December 1969
- 839th Air Division, 31 March 1970
- Twenty-First Air Force, 31 December 1974 – 1 October 1975

Attached to Operating Location A, Headquarters Twenty-First Air Force, 31 December 1974 – 30 June 1975

- 76th Airlift Division, 15 December 1980
- Twenty-First Air Force, 1 October 1985 – 12 July 1991
- Air Force District of Washington, 22 June 2006 – 30 September 2010
- Air Force District of Washington, 12 June 2020 – present

=== Components ===
Groups

- 316th Troop Carrier Group (later 316th Operations Group): 15 August 1947 – 25 August 1948; 23 August 1948 – 20 October 1949; 22 June 2006 – 30 September 2010; 12 June 2020 – present

Squadrons

- 29th Tactical Airlift Squadron: 1 April-15 November 1971
- 36th Troop Carrier Squadron (later 36th Tactical Airlift Squadron): 1 April 1966 – 25 March 1968 (detached 28 March-29 June 1967); 5 July 1968 – 1 July 1975 (detached 25 February – 15 June 1969, 24 November 1969 – 7 February 1970, 13 August – 18 October 1970, 12 July – 10 September 1971, 20 May – 8 September 1972, 12 March – 18 May 1973, 14 January – 16 March 1974, and 13 August – 16 October 1974)
- 37th Troop Carrier Squadron (later 37th Tactical Airlift Squadron): 1 October 1966 – 15 September 1975 (detached 24 September – 21 December 1967, 27 April – 13 May 1968, 24 November 1968 – 5 March 1969, 13 July – 26 September 1969, 1 March – 11 May 1970, 7 February – 13 April 1971, 5 January – 13 March 1972, 30 November 1972 – 15 March 1973, 31 August – 16 November 1973, 12 April – 29 June 1974, and 5 April – 15 June 1975)
- 38th Troop Carrier Squadron (later 38th Tactical Airlift Squadron): 1 January 1967 – 1 July 1969 (detached 5 February – 22 July 1968); 15 November 1971 – 31 August 1975 (detached 13 March – 16 May 1972, 31 August – 5 December 1972, 18 May-13 July 1973, 29 August – 3 October 1973, 13 December 1974 – 15 February 1975; not operational, 1 July – 31 August 1975)
- 316th Field Maintenance Squadron: 1 April 1966 – 15 September 1975

=== Stations ===
- Greenville Army Air Base (later Greenville Air Force Base), South Carolina, 15 August 1947 – 25 August 1948
- Greenville Air Force Base, South Carolina, 23 August 1948 – 20 October 1949
- Langley Air Force Base, Virginia, 25 November 1965 – 1 October 1975
- Andrews Air Force Base, Maryland, 15 December 1980 – 12 July 1991
- Andrews Air Force Base (later part of Joint Base Andrews), Maryland, 22 June 2006 – 30 September 2010; 11 June 2020 – present

=== Aircraft ===
- Douglas C-47 Skytrain (1947–1949)
- Fairchild C-82 Packet (1947–1949)
- Waco CG-15 (1947–1949)
- Lockheed C-130 Hercules (1966–1975)
- Bell UH-1N Twin Huey (2006–2010, 2020–present)
- HH-60W Jolly Green II (2026–present)

== See also ==
- List of wings of the United States Air Force
