= 840th Air Division =

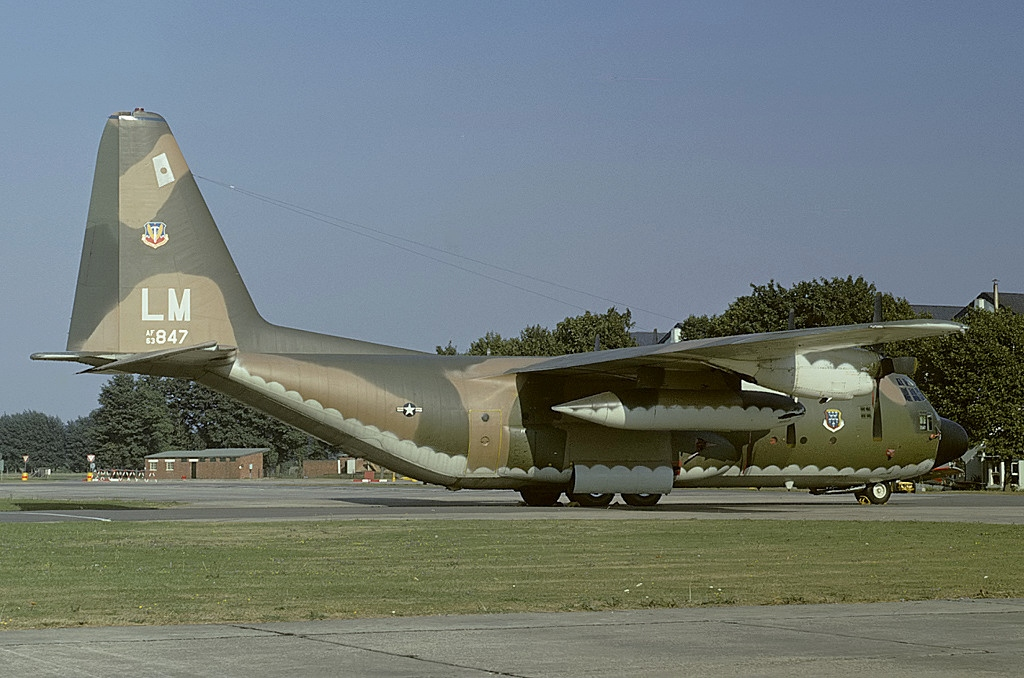
- C-130E Hercules of the 316th Tactical Airlift Wing (Note: Aircraft is Lockheed C-130E-LM Hercules, serial 63-7847. This plane was transferred to the Aerospace Maintenance and Regeneration Center on 8 July 2008. Baugher, Joe (26 July 2023). "1963 USAF Serial Numbers". Joe Baugher. Photo taken at RAF Abbingdon.)
- Active: 1964–1969
- Country: United States
- Branch: United States Air Force
- Role: Command of airlift forces

Insignia
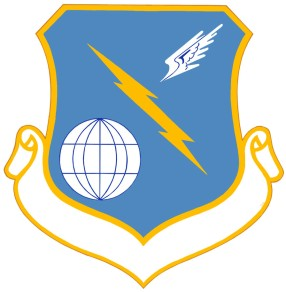
- 840th Air Division emblem (Note: Approved 24 April 1968. Description: Celeste, a lightning flash bendwise or between a pair of wings elevated argent and a sphere of the like [color] grid lined and rimmed azure, all within a diminished bordure or.)

The 840th Air Division is an inactive United States Air Force organization. It was assigned to Ninth Air Force at Lockbourne Air Force Base, Ohio, where it was inactivated on 24 December 1969. The division's components provided tactical airlift support worldwide, and after 1965, trained Lockheed C-130 Hercules crews and maintenance personnel, primarily for deployment to the Pacific and participation in the Vietnam War.

From July 1965 until June 1969, the air division's 840th Combat Support Group served as the host for all active duty Air Force units stationed at Lockbourne.

== History ==
The unit was organized in October 1964 at Lockbourne Air Force Base, Ohio and assigned the 317th Troop Carrier Wing, which had moved to Lockbourne in June. In November, the 463d Troop Carrier Wing at Langley Air Force Base was assigned as the division's second tactical wing. The 463d Wing was partially deployed to support the Gulf of Tonkin Incident when it was assigned to the division.

The division controlled its assigned troop carrier wings and provided staff and advisory services to ensure their operational capability to deploy worldwide, and focused on airborne operations. From April to September 1965 the 463d Wing deployed to support the Organization of American States intervention in the Dominican Civil War. In July 1965, Lockbourne transferred to Tactical Air Command from Strategic Air Command and the 840th Combat Support Group and 840th Tactical Hospital, were activated and assigned to the air division.

In November 1965, the 463d Wing moved permanently from Langley to the Pacific. It temporarily left behind one of its squadrons, the 772d Troop Carrier Squadron, which was assigned directly to the division until rejoining the wing in January 1966., Meanwhile, the 317th Wing focused on providing Lockheed C-130 Hercules aircraft replacement training support for Pacific Air Forces.

After the move of the 463d Wing, airlift units at Langley were organized into the 316th Troop Carrier Wing, which was assigned to the division. The division's wings participated in worldwide tactical airlift operations, humanitarian missions, tactical exercises, and maneuvers. After 1965 the division's C-130 Hercules training included training for maintenance personnel and reserve personnel activated as a result of the Vietnam War.

In June 1969, in preparation for the inactivation of the division, the 840th Combat Support Group was inactivated and host responsibility for Lockbourne was assumed by the 317th Wing. The 840th was inactivated in December 1969 and its wings were reassigned directly to Ninth Air Force.

== Lineage ==
- Established as the 840 Air Division and activated on 14 September 1964 (not organized)

Organized on 1 October 1964
Inactivated on 24 December 1969

=== Assignments ===
- Tactical Air Command, 14 September 1964 (not organized)
- Ninth Air Force, 1 October 1964 – 24 December 1969

=== Components ===
Wings

- 316th Troop Carrier Wing (later 316th Tactical Airlift Wing): 25 November 1965 – 24 December 1969
- 317th Troop Carrier Wing (later 317th Tactical Airlift Wing): 1 October 1964 – 24 December 1969
- 463d Troop Carrier Wing: 9 November 1964 – 23 November 1965

Group

- 840th Combat Support Group: 1 July 1965 – 8 June 1969

Squadron

- 772d Troop Carrier Squadron: 23 November 1965 – 7 February 1966

Other

- 840th Tactical Hospital: 1 July 1965 – 8 June 1969

=== Stations ===
- Lockbourne Air Force Base, Ohio, 1 October 1964 – 24 December 1969

=== Aircraft ===
- Lockheed C-130 Hercules, 1964–1969
- Fairchild C-123 Provider, 1969

=== Commanders ===
- Col LeRoy M. Stanton, 1 October 1964
- Col Kenneth W. Northamer, 26 August 1965
- Col Orin M. Bixby, 30 August 1967 – 24 December 1969

== See also ==
- List of Lockheed C-130 Hercules operators
- List of United States Air Force air divisions
