= George T. Lewis Airport =

Airport in Florida, U.S.

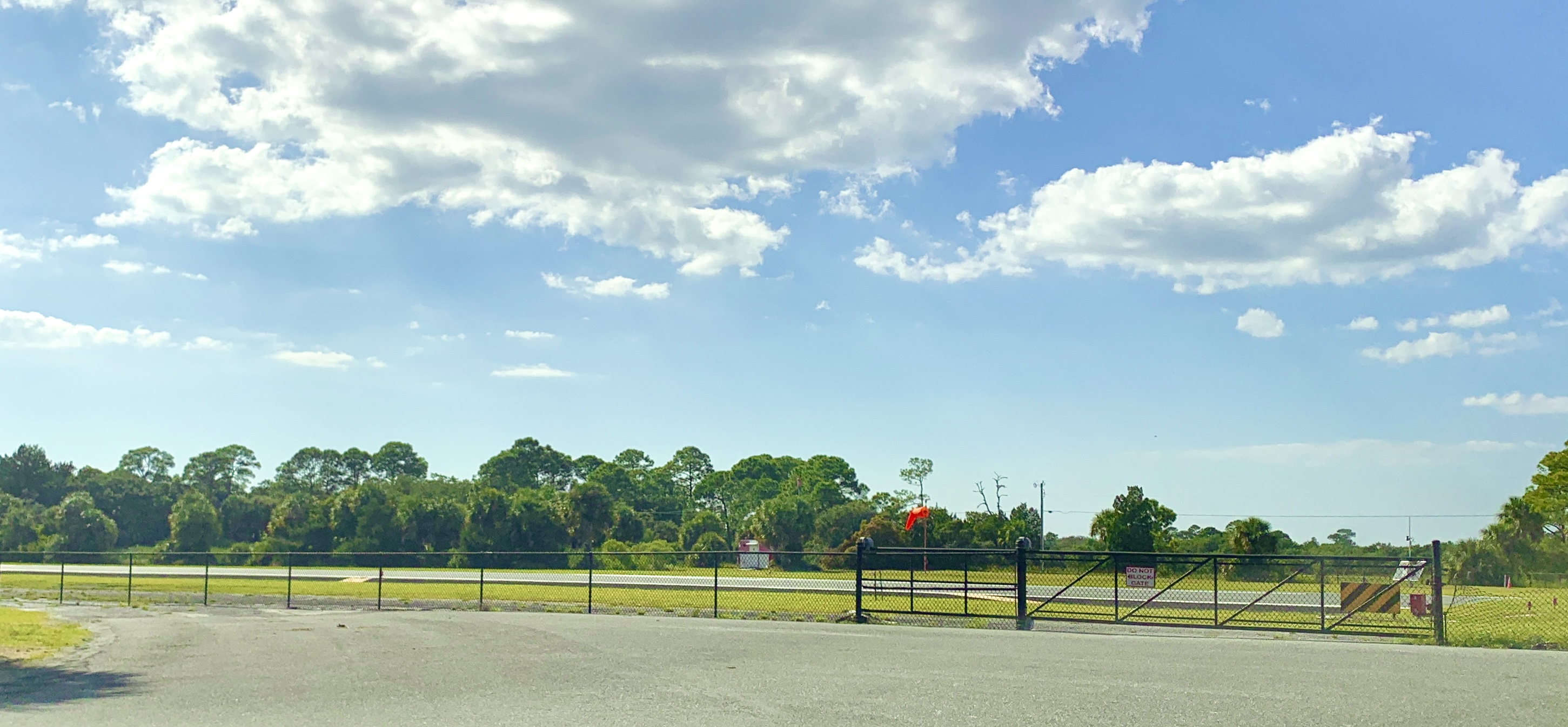
- IATA: CDK; ICAO: KCDK; FAA LID: CDK

Summary
- Airport type: Public
- Owner: Levy County
- Location: Cedar Key, Florida
- Elevation AMSL: 11 ft (3.4 m)
- Coordinates: 29°08′03″N 083°03′02″W
- Interactive map of George T. Lewis Airport

Runways
Direction	Length		Surface
Direction	ft	m	Surface
5/23	2,355	718	Asphalt

Statistics (2000)
- Aircraft operations: 4,000
- Source: Federal Aviation Administration

George T. Lewis Airport (IATA: CDK, ICAO: KCDK, FAA LID: CDK) is a county-owned public-use airport in Levy County, Florida, United States. It is located one nautical mile (1.85 km) west of the central business district of Cedar Key. It was opened in 1936 by the United States military, and it does not have a control tower.

The airport is surrounded by a bird sanctuary and wildlife refuge. Ospreys, eagles, herons, egrets, buzzards, and other birds are common in the vicinity of the airport.

== History ==
Formerly used as an air/sea rescue base during and after World War II, the facility was deeded to Levy County. It serves as a basic utility itinerant airport in Levy County for the resort and recreation activities of the City of Cedar Key. Its service area includes Cedar Key and the small communities of Rosewood, Sumner and Vista. It is one of two public airports in the county, the other being Williston Municipal Airport in Williston. It is located approximately 52 miles (84 km) southwest of Gainesville Regional Airport and 43 miles (69 km) west of Ocala International Airport-Jim Taylor Field.

A five-year construction plan to improve visual aids at the airport got underway by the Department of Transportation in 1998.

== Facilities and aircraft ==
George T. Lewis Airport covers an area of 52 acres (21 ha) at an elevation of 11 feet (3 m) above mean sea level. It has one asphalt paved runway designated 5/23 which measures 2,355 by 100 feet (718 x 30 m) with a displaced threshold on Runway 23 - it is the shortest paved public runway in the state of Florida. For the 12-month period ending June 30, 2000, the airport had 4,000 general aviation aircraft operations, an average of 10 per day.

No fuel or maintenance is available at the airport.

== See also ==
- List of airports in Florida
