= Celone/San Nicola d'Arpi Airfield =

Celone/San Nicola d'Arpi Airfield Foggia Satellite Airfield #1
- Part of Fifteenth Air Force
- Province of Foggia, Italy
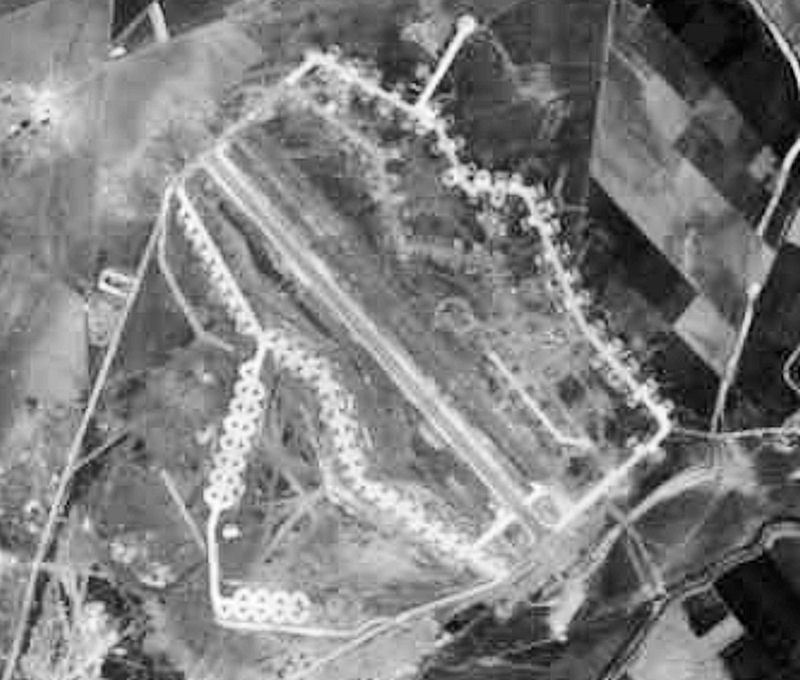
- Celone/San Nicola d'Arpi Airfield - 29 April 1945

Site information
- Type: Military airfield
- Controlled by: United States Army Air Forces

Location
- Location of Celone/San Nicola d'Arpi Airfield, Italy
- Coordinates: 41°33′04″N 015°33′32″E

Site history
- Built: 1943
- In use: 1943-1945
- Battles/wars: World War II

Celone/San Nicola d'Arpi Airfield is an abandoned World War II military airfield in Italy. It was located 10 kilometers north of Foggia, in the Province of Foggia. The airfield was abandoned and dismantled after the end of the war in 1945.

== History ==
Celone/San Nicola d'Arpi Airfield was an Italian Air Force (Regia Aeronautica) facility, built before World War II. With the surrender of Fascist Italy to the Allies on 3 September 1943, the German Luftwaffe seized control of the field upon hearing of Italy's capitulation. The Luftwaffe sent a squadron of Kampfgeschwader 26, with some Heinkel He 111 medium bombers and Junkers Ju 52 transports to the field; however, Allied forces seized control of the Tavoliere plain in late September/October and occupied the airfield.

The American Army Corps of Engineers rebuilt the facility into a heavy bomber-capable airfield. A 6,000' x 100' runway was laid over pierced steel planking, oriented 14/32. A second (unfinished) runway east of the main runway was used as a crash strip. There were two perimeter tracks, and several other loop taxiways each containing about 100 aircraft parking hardstands, both of the double loop for bombers and single frying pan type for fighters. There may have been some temporary hangars and buildings; however, it appears that personnel were quartered primarily in tents, and most aircraft maintenance took place in the open on hardstands. It also had a steel control tower.

The major tenant of the airfield was the USAAF Fifteenth Air Force 463d Bombardment Group, which arrived from Lakeland Army Airfield, Florida on 9 March 1944. It was equipped with Boeing B-17 Flying Fortress bombers. Celone was shared with the 2 Wing, South African Air Force, with two squadrons of B-24 Liberators 31 and 34 Squadrons.

The 463d Bomb Group consisted of four squadrons:

- 772d Bombardment Squadron
- 773d Bombardment Squadron
- 774th Bombardment Squadron
- 775th Bombardment Squadron

From Celone the "Swoose Group", as the 463d was called operated chiefly against strategic objectives. Attacked such targets as marshaling yards, oil refineries, and aircraft factories in Italy, Germany, Austria, Czechoslovakia, Romania, Yugoslavia, and Greece. It received two Distinguished Unit Citations, the first for bombing oil refineries in Ploesti on 18 May 1944. When clouds limited visibility to such an extent that other groups turned back, a second DUC was received for three damaging enemy attacks to bomb tank factories in Berlin on 24 March 1945. The 463d also participated in the invasion of Southern France in August 1944 by striking bridges, gun positions, and other targets.

A notable mission of the South African 2 Wing was supporting the 1944 Warsaw Uprising with air drops of munitions and other supplies The SAAF also participated in the tricky operations in dropping mines into the River Danube in Northern Europe to thwart German attempts to use river barges to carry oil supplies from the Romanian oilfields into Germany. Other duties included being sent to assist Italian Partisans in the Italian Alps. As can be imagined, flying conditions here were hazardous in maintaining ground contact in mountainous areas.

Both the SAAF and the 463d departed after the end of the war, the 463d sending the Air Echelon to Pisa Airport where they were converted into transports by Air Transport Command for moving personnel back to the United States. The Ground Echelon of the 463d was inactivated at Celone on 25 September 1945. after its personnel were sent back to the United States over the summer of 1945. Sometime after that departure, the engineers moved in and dismantled the facility.

Today Celone Airfield has been returned to agriculture; however, extensive scarring of the landscape remains, showing various dispersal pads and taxiways and other features.

== See also ==
- Boeing B-17 Flying Fortress airfields in the Mediterranean Theater of Operations
