= 463rd Airlift Group =

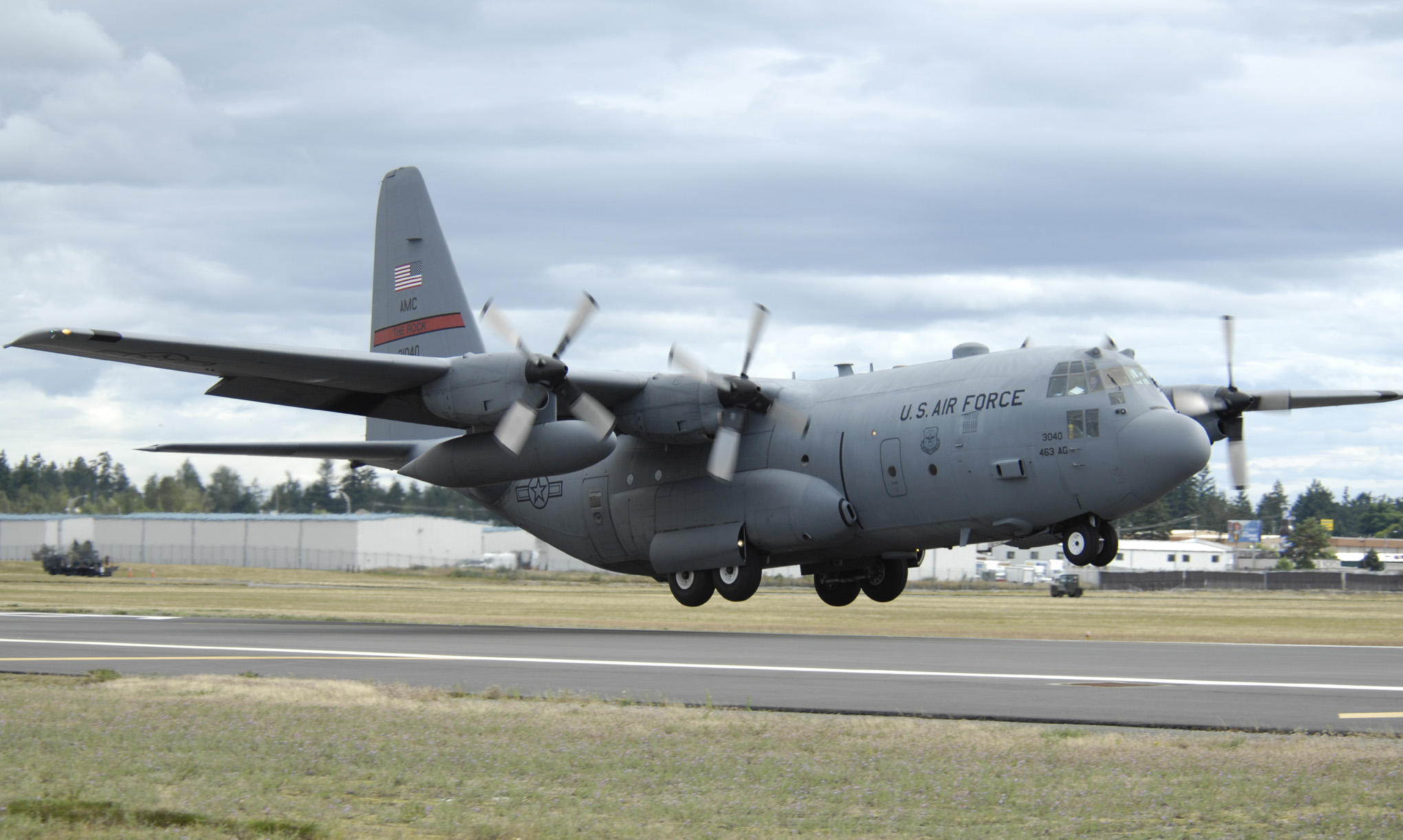
- A C-130 Hercules from Little Rock AFB lands at McChord AFB for Rodeo 2007 on 21 July 2007
- Active: 1953–1971; 1972–1993; 1997–2008
- Country: United States
- Branch: United States Air Force
- Role: Airlift
- Engagements: Operation Urgent Fury (Grenada); Operation Just Cause (Panama)

- Decorations: Air Force Outstanding Unit Award with Combat "V" Device (3x); Air Force Outstanding Unit Award (10x); Republic of Vietnam Gallantry Cross with Palm

Insignia
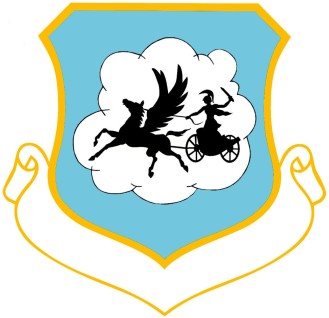
- 463rd Airlift Groupemblem (Note: Approved 30 August 1954.)

The United States Air Force's 463rd Airlift Group was a theater airlift unit last stationed at Little Rock Air Force Base, Arkansas. It was activated in 1997 and was inactivated in October 2008.

It had over 1,200 Airmen. The unit employed 30 C-130 aircraft that perform airlift missions worldwide. It provided direct support to warfighting combatant commanders with theater combat aerial delivery of personnel and their resupply worldwide.

== Units ==
The unit comprised eight squadrons: five flying, two maintenance, and one support.

- 30th Airlift Squadron (C-130H) Cheyenne Regional Airport (Associate Unit)
- 41st Airlift Squadron (C-130J) "Black Cats" (Silver tail Stripe)
- 50th Airlift Squadron (C-130H) "Red Devils" (Red tail Stripe)
- 53rd Airlift Squadron (C-130E) "Blackjacks" (Gold tail Stripe)
- 61st Airlift Squadron (C-130E) "Green Hornets" (Green tail Stripe)
- 463rd Aircraft Maintenance Squadron
- 463rd Maintenance Squadron
- 463rd Operations Support Squadron

== History ==
When active, the 463rd Airlift Group is entitled to display the awards earned by the 463rd Bombardment Group prior to 16 January 1953, unless that group is assigned to another headquarters.

=== Cold War ===
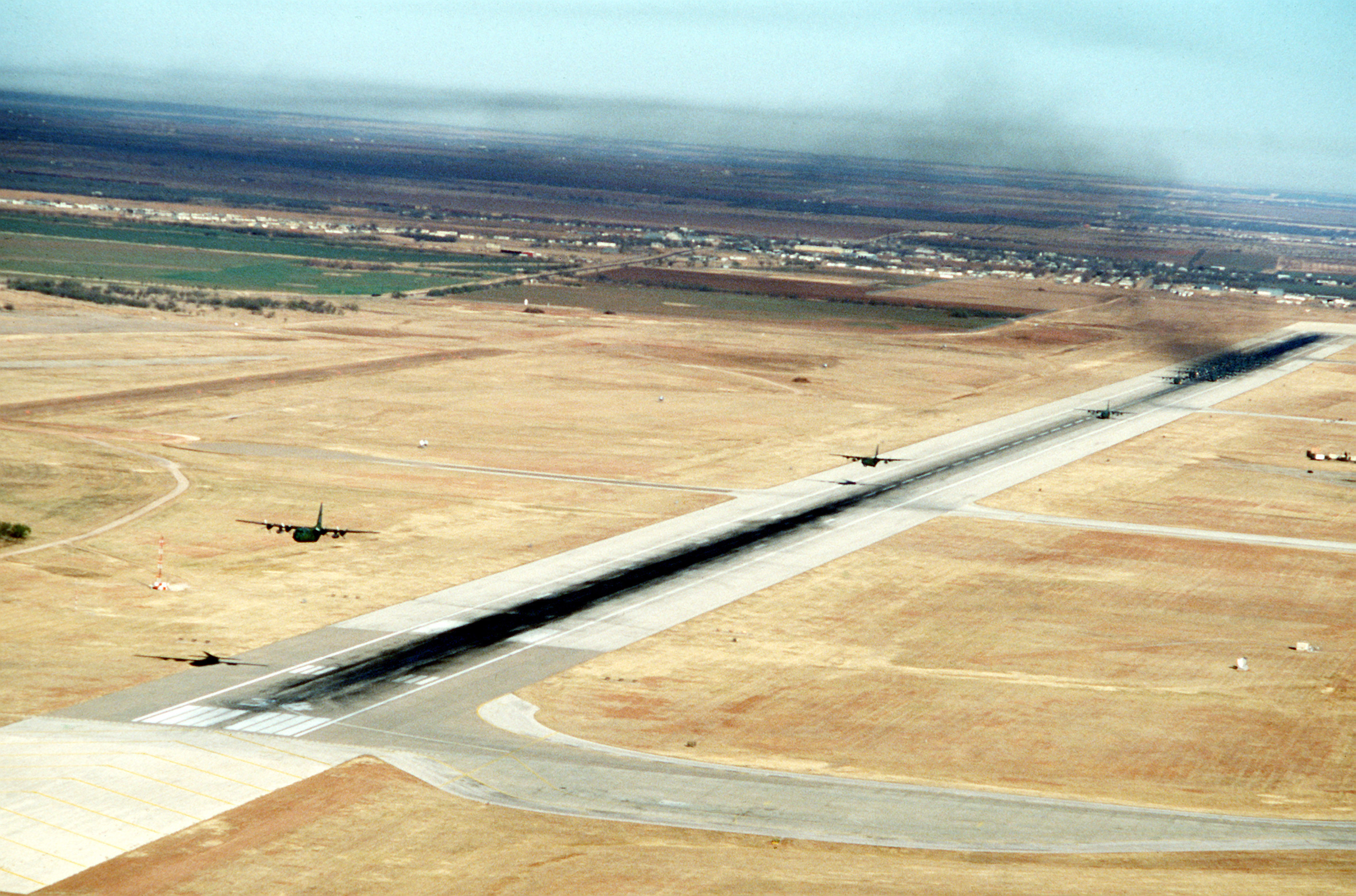
Two C-130 Hercules aircraft of the 463rd get airborne as the remaining 16 aircraft wait on the runway during a Minimum Interval Takeoff at the start of a mass airdrop exercise at Dyess

The group was first constituted as the 463rd Troop Carrier Wing, Medium and activated at Memphis Airport, Tennessee, on 16 January 1953, when it assumed the mission, equipment and personnel of the 516th Troop Carrier Wing, a reserve unit called to active duty for the Korean War, which was simultaneously inactivated. Assigned to Tactical Air Command (TAC) and equipped with Fairchild C-119 Flying Boxcars. On 1 September, the wing moved to Ardmore Air Force Base, Oklahoma. In December 1957, it began replacing its C-119s with the new Lockheed C-130A Hercules turboprop transport. In 1959 Ardmore closed and the 463rd transferred to Sewart Air Force Base, Tennessee, to join the 314th TCW, making Sewart the only US C-130 troop carrier base. The wing moved again in 1964, this time to Langley Air Force Base, Virginia, where it replaced a TAC refueling wing that was being discontinued.

The 463rd airlifted and airdropped troops and cargo to support operations and exercises worldwide, supporting deployments during the following crises: Lebanon (July 1958), Taiwan (August 1958), Berlin (September 1961), Cuba (October–November 1962), the Gulf of Tonkin (August–December 1964), Southeast Asia (February and April–November 1965), and the Dominican Republic (April–September 1965).

The wing moved to Pacific Air Forces in November 1965 and was assigned to the 315th Air Division. Wing headquarters was at Mactan Air Base in Mactan Island in the Philippines and two squadrons were based at Clark until November 1968 when the wing and the two Mactan squadrons transferred to Clark. In PACAF, the wing initially provided airlift in Thailand then provided airplanes and crews to a 315th Air Division detachment at Tan Son Nhut Air Base, South Vietnam. In December 1965, began furnishing aircraft and crews to fly missions in Southeast Asia. The Tan Son Nhut operation was part of 315th Air Division until October 1966 when 834th Air Division activated. The 463rd was one of three C-130 wings that provided airplanes and crews to 834th Air Division detachments. In the spring of 1969 the 463rd detachment transferred from Tan Son Nhut to Cam Ranh Air Base, where it remained until the wing ceased aircraft operations in Southeast Asia on 25 October 1971. Redesignated as the 463rd Tactical Airlift Wing in August 1967. On 31 December 1971 the 463rd was inactivated.

Reactivated at Dyess Air Force Base, Texas, in June 1972, the 463rd began participating in operations and exercises worldwide for TAC. In 1974, all tactical airlift was transferred to Military Airlift Command, then to Air Mobility Command (AMC) in 1992 when MAC was inactivated. The wing's tactical components deployed frequently to Europe, the Pacific, and the Canal Zone to provide air transportation as needed. On 1 November 1991, the wing implemented the Objective Wing organization and was redesignated as the 463rd Airlift Wing.

=== Post Cold War ===
The wing was inactivated on 1 October 1993 and most of its personnel and equipment was absorbed by the incoming 7th Wing at Dyess. The 7th was a composite wing which incorporated Dyess' C-130s, which were transferred from Air Mobility Command to Air Combat Command (ACC).

When the US-based C-130 force was realigned in 1997 from ACC back to AMC, the 314th Airlift Wing at Little Rock Air Force Base was split into two pieces. The wing and training units went to Air Education and Training Command. AMC reactivated the 463rd as the 463rd Airlift Group on 1 April 1997 to control the two operational C-130 squadrons.

From Little Rock, the 463rd provided worldwide airlift, delivering combat, humanitarian, and other supplies. On 1 October 2008, the 463rd Airlift Group was inactivated and its personnel and equipment transferred to the 19th Airlift Wing.

== Lineage ==
- Established as the 463rd Troop Carrier Wing, Medium on 1 December 1952.

Activated on 16 January 1953
Redesignated 463rd Troop Carrier Wing, Assault on 1 October 1962
Redesignated 463rd Troop Carrier Wing, Medium on 15 May 1965
Redesignated 463rd Troop Carrier Wing on 8 December 1965
Redesignated 463rd Tactical Airlift Wing on 1 August 1967
Inactivated on 31 December 1971

- Activated on 1 June 1972

Redesignated 463rd Airlift Wing on 1 November 1991
Inactivated on 1 October 1993

- Redesignated 463rd Airlift Group on 31 March 1997

Activated 1 April 1997
Inactivated on 1 October 2008

=== Assignments ===
- Eighteenth Air Force, 16 January 1953
- Ninth Air Force, 1 September 1957
- 838th Air Division, 25 September 1957
- 839th Air Division, 15 January 1959
- 838th Air Division, 1 October 1963
- 840th Air Division, 9 November 1964
- 315th Air Division (Combat Cargo), 23 November 1965
- 6th Air Division, 1 November 1968
- Thirteenth Air Force, 15 December 1969 – 31 December 1971
- 834th Air Division, 1 June 1972
- Twenty-Second Air Force, 31 December 1974
- Fifteenth Air Force, 1 July – 1 October 1993
- Twenty-First Air Force, 1 April 1997
- Eighteenth Air Force, 1 October 2003 – 1 October 2008

=== Components ===
Wings

- 456th Troop Carrier: attached 10 March – 9 July 1956 (not operational).

Groups

- 309th Troop Carrier Group: attached 8 July 1955 – c. 21 May 1956
- 419th Troop Carrier Group: attached 9 July 1956 – 25 September 1957
- 463rd Troop Carrier Group (later 463rd Operations Group): 16 January 1953 – 25 September 1957; 1 November 1991 – 1 October 1993

Squadrons

- 16th Troop Carrier Squadron: attached 14 November 1954 – 8 July 1955
- 18th Tactical Airlift Training: 1 June – 31 August 1972 (not operational, 25–31 August 1972)
- 20th Operations: 17 February 1970 – 31 December 1971
- 29th Troop Carrier (later, 29 Tactical Airlift) Squadron: attached 30 January – 24 March 1966, assigned 25 March 1966 – 31 October 1970 (not operational 1 July – 31 October 1970)
- 47th Tactical Airlift Squadron: 6 July – 1 August 1973
- 50th Airlift Squadron: 1 April 1997 – 1 October 2008
- 61st Airlift Squadron: 1 April 1997 – 1 October 2008
- 360th Tactical Electronic Warfare Squadron: 24 November 1972 – 1 July 1973 (not operational)
- 772nd Bombardment Squadron (later 772nd Tactical Airlift Squadron): 25 September 1957 – 23 November 1965; 7 February 1966 – 15 June 1971 (not operational 1–15 June 1971); 1 June 1972 – 1 November 1991 (detached 9 July – 15 September 1972; 10 November 1972 – 10 January 1973; 6 May – 4 June 1973; 5 February – 8 April 1974; 5 January – 15 March 1975; 30 November 1975 – 15 January 1976; 3 August – 15 October 1976; 3 November 1977 – 7 January 1978; 3 April – 5 June 1979; 3 August – 5 October 1980; 3 December 1981 – 13 February 1982; 4 April – 7 June 1983; 10 October – 7 December 1985; 5 June – 12 August 1987; 1 August – 13 October 1988; 1 October – 14 December 1989)
- 773rd Troop Carrier Squadron (later 773rd Tactical Airlift Squadron): 25 September 1957 – 31 October 1971 (detached 15 November 1954 – 19 May 1955 and 3 January – 6 March 1961; not operational 15–31 October 1971); 1 June 1972 – 1 November 1991 (detached 1 June – 8 July 1972; 16 September – 16 November 1972; 23 February – 12 May 1973; 3 July – 16 September 1973; 5 May – 17 July 1974; 3 May – 16 July 1975; 3 February – 9 April 1976; 7 November 1976 – 15 January 1977; 3 August – 5 October 1977; 19 September – 1 December 1978; 3 February – 5 April 1980; 3 June – 14 August 1981; 3 October – 7 December 1982; 8 February – 10 April 1984; 6 April – 4 June 1985; 9 December 1986 – 3 February 1987; 1 February – 16 April 1988; 1 April – 14 June 1989; 2 June – 14 August 1990).
- 774th Troop Carrier Squadron (later 774th Tactical Airlift Squadron): 25 September 1957 – 31 December 1971 (detached 21 March – 19 June 1961; not operational 26 December 1962 – 1 April 1963); 1 August 1973 – 1 October 1986 (detached 3 October – 16 December 1973; 3 September – 16 November 1974; 4 August – 15 October 1975; 3 May – 7 July 1976; 3 June – 5 August 1977; 3 March – 5 May 1978; 28 September – 5 December 1979; 3 February – 7 April 1981; 5 April – 15 June 1982; 4 August – 10 October 1983; 5 June – 4 August 1984; 3 December 1984 – 9 February 1985; 5 April – 12 June 1986)
- Troop Carrier Squadron Provisional, 4480th: attached 3 January – 1 April 1963
- 6485th Operations: 1 September – 1 December 1968

=== Stations ===
- Memphis Municipal Airport, Tennessee, 16 January 1953
- Ardmore Air Force Base, Oklahoma, 1 September 1953
- Sewart Air Force Base, Tennessee, 15 January 1959
- Langley Air Force Base, Virginia, 1 July 1963 – 22 November 1965
- Mactan Island Airfield, Philippines, 23 November 1965
- Clark Air Base, Luzon, Philippines, 15 July 1968 – 31 December 1971
- Dyess Air Force Base, Texas, 1 June 1972 – 1 October 1993
- Little Rock Air Force Base, Arkansas, 1 April 1997 – 1 October 2008

=== Aircraft ===
- Curtiss C-46 Commando (1953)
- Fairchild C-119 Flying Boxcar (1953–1957)
- Chase C-122A Avitruc (1955) (YC-122, 1954–1955)
- Fairchild C-123B Provider (1955–1957)
- Lockheed C-130 Hercules

C-130A (1956–1959)
C-130B (1959–1971)
C-130E (1972–1975, 1997–2008)
C-130H (1975–1993, 1997–2008)

- Douglas C-124C Globemaster II (1970–1971)
- Douglas C-118A Liftmaster (1968, 1970–1971)

DeHavilland Canada C-7A Caribou (1972)

== See also ==
- List of Lockheed C-130 Hercules operators
