= Williston Municipal Airport =

Airport in Florida, U.S.

- IATA: none; ICAO: none; FAA LID: X60

Summary
- Airport type: Public
- Owner: City of Williston
- Serves: Williston, Florida
- Elevation AMSL: 75 ft / 23 m
- Coordinates: 29°21′21″N 082°28′19″W

Map
- Location of airport in Florida X60 (the United States)

Runways
Direction	Length		Surface
Direction	ft	m	Surface
5/23	6,669	2,033	Concrete
14/32	4,979	1,518	Asphalt

Statistics
- Aircraft operations (2018): 16,250
- Based aircraft (2022): 82
- Source: Federal Aviation Administration

Williston Municipal Airport (FAA LID: X60) is a city-owned, public-use airport located two nautical miles (4 km) southwest of the central business district of Williston, a city in Levy County, Florida, United States. Commonly referred to as Williston Airport, it is located 23 miles (37 km) southwest of Gainesville Regional Airport (GNV). Opened in 1974 for public use, it does not have a control tower.

This airport is included in the National Plan of Integrated Airport Systems for 2021–2025, which categorized it as a general aviation facility.

Within 5 miles (8 km) of the airport are the internationally known dive springs of Devil's Den and Blue Grotto.

== History ==
Formerly known as Montbrook Army Air Field during World War II, the airfield was opened as a US Army Air Forces installation on January 1, 1942. It appears to have been closed by the end of 1944.

In 1974, the facility was deeded to the City of Williston. It serves as a basic utility airport in Levy County for the City of Archer, City of Bronson, City of McIntosh, City of Reddick and the City of Williston. It is one of two airports in the county, serving alongside the George T. Lewis Airport in Cedar Key.

A planned upgrade of the airport slowly started with annexation of land in 1988. In 1992, it was selected as a preferred location for a regional airport within 20 miles (32 km). A second, larger, runway was completed by 2002 and allowed for jet aircraft to use the facility. An Automated Weather Observation Station (AWOS) was installed at the airport by the end of 2005. Future upgrades on the 2,000 acre (8 km^{2}) site include additional hangars, a corporate hangar park and a new fixed-base operator.

== Facilities and aircraft ==
Williston Municipal Airport covers an area of 1,600 acres (647 ha) at an elevation of 75 feet (23 m) above mean sea level. It has three runways: 5/23 is 6,669 by 100 feet (2,033 x 30 m) with a concrete surface; 14/32 is 4,979 by 60 feet (1,518 x 18 m) with an asphalt and 18/36 is 2,051 by 60 feet (625 X 18 m) turf surface.

For the 12-month period ending September 21, 2018, the airport had 16,250 general aviation aircraft operations, an average of 45 per day. In April 2022, there were 82 aircraft based at this airport: 61 single-engine, 11 multi-engine, 6 jet and 4 helicopter.

Services available at the airport include painting, upholstery, turbine engine repair and helicopter sales.

== See also ==
- List of airports in Florida
