= Ardmore Air Force Base =

US military airport in Ardmore, Oklahoma

Ardmore Army Air Field (1942-1946) Ardmore Air Force Base (1953-1958)
- Part of United States Army (1942-1946); US Air Force (1953-1958)
- at the Ardmore Industrial park in Carter County, Oklahoma
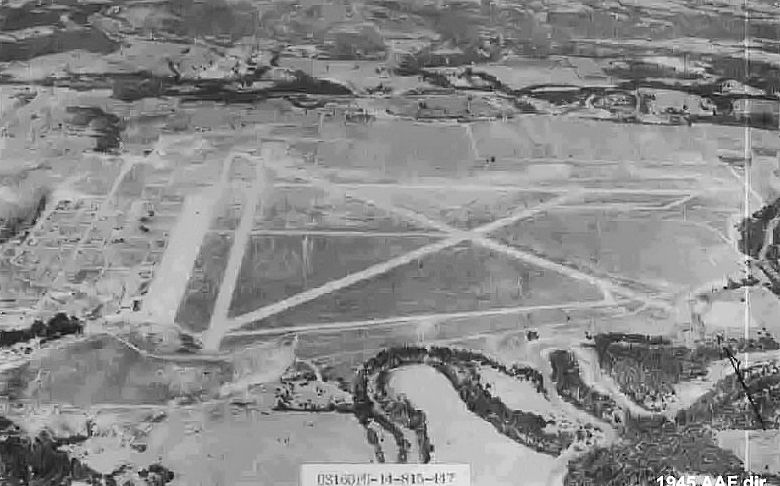
- Ardmore Army Airfield in 1944

Site information
- Type: Air Force Base
- Owner: Ardmore Industrial Park

Location
- Coordinates: 34°18′15″N 097°01′14″W
- Area: 2,498 acres

Site history
- Built: 1942
- Built by: United States Army
- In use: 1942-1946 (Army); 1953-1958 (Air Force)

Ardmore Army Air Field, later Ardmore Air Force base was an installation of the United States Army and later Air Force. It was named after the nearby city of Ardmore, Oklahoma but was actually located closer to the town of Gene Autry, Oklahoma. It was a military installation from 1942 to 1946 and again from 1953 to 1958. It is now home to the Ardmore Municipal Airport.

== Second World War ==
First established as the Ardmore Army Air Field in 1942, the post was established to train airmen for war service.

Initially the post served to train military glider pilots, under the supervision of I Troop Carrier Command, but later trained combat crews to fly the Martin B-26 Marauder and the Boeing B-17 Flying Fortress.

All four squadrons of Lt. Colonel Thomas B. Hall's 394th Bombardment Group (the 584th; 585th; 586th; and 587th) were briefly stationed at Ardmore AAF for five weeks in July-August 1943. The group was then moved again, on August 19, 1943, to Kellogg Field, Battle Creek, Michigan.

Later in the war, the post was also used to house German prisoners of war from June 1-November 1, 1945.

The post was first operated as part of the Second Air Force but was later transferred to the Third Air Force on April 12, 1943. This was followed by a designation of the post as a sub-field of Will Rogers Air Force Base in June 1943 and then a later transfer of the post back to being part of the Second Air Force in August 1943.

== Cold War, 1953-1958 ==
The base was decommissioned in 1946 and used by American Airlines as a training facility until 1953 when the post was reactivated, this time named the "Ardmore Air Force Base." Units stationed at the post during some or all of this era included the:

- 463d Troop Carrier Wing (Medium)
- 16th Troop Carrier Squadron (Assault Fixed Wing) - (October 17, 1954 to July 8, 1955)
- 309th Troop Carrier Group (Assault Fixed Wing) - (July 8, 1955-?)
- 456th Troop Carrier Group
- 419th Troop Carrier Group - (July 7, 1956-Sept. 1958)

The first Lockheed C-130A Hercules put into active USAF service was at Ardmore Air Force Base when plane number 55-023 (named the "City of Ardmore") first went into service as part of the 463d Troop Carrier Wing on December 9, 1956, and later saw action in deployments to Europe, Africa, Japan, Okinawa, and Vietnam (where the plane was nearly destroyed) before finally being decommissioned and placed on static display at Linear Park at Dyess AFB in Abilene, Texas in 1989.

Ardmore Air Force Base was closed in 1958. after which it became the Ardmore Municipal Airport.

== Legacy ==
Today, the Department of Defense reports that there are five "medium risk" hazard sites (explosives or toxic waste) at the former military installation.
