= Joint Base Andrews =

United States military facility located in Prince George's County, Maryland

- Camp Springs, Maryland in the United States of America
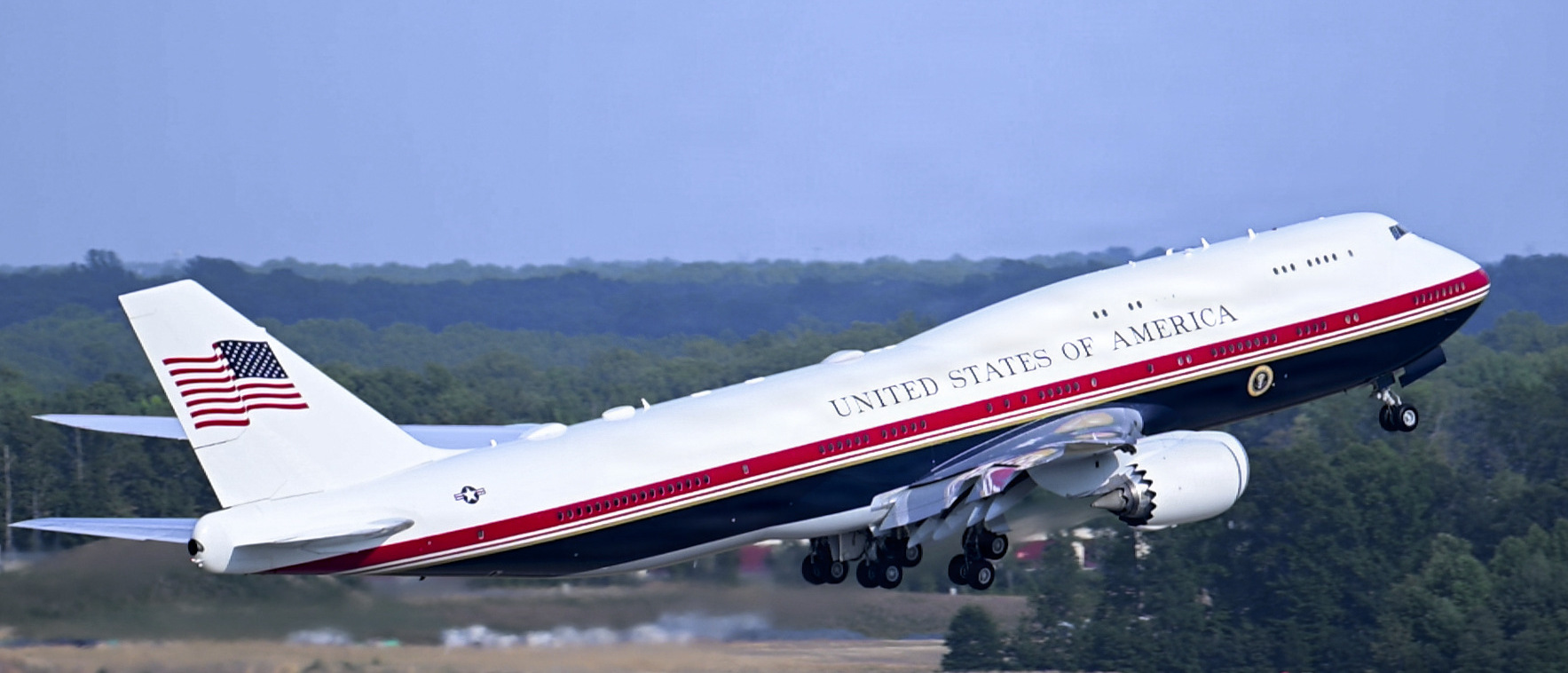
- Boeing VC-25B Bridge, known as Air Force One when the president is on board, taking off for the United States Semiquincentennial flyover of Washington DC on 4 July 2026

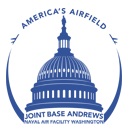
- Motto: America's Airfield

Site information
- Type: US military Joint Base
- Owner: Department of Defense
- Operator: US Air Force
- Controlled by: Air Force District of Washington (AFDW)
- Condition: Operational
- Website: www.jba.af.mil

Location
- Location in the United States
- Coordinates: 38°48′39″N 076°52′01″W

Site history
- Built: 1942 (as Camp Springs Air Base)
- In use: 2009 – present (as Joint Base)

Garrison information
- Current commander: Colonel Andrew M. Purath
- Garrison: 316th Wing (Host)

Airfield information
- Identifiers: IATA: ADW, ICAO: KADW, FAA LID: ADW, WMO: 745940
- Elevation: 85.3 metres (280 ft) AMSL
Runways
Direction	Length and surface
01R/19L	2,973.6 metres (9,756 ft) Asphalt/Concrete
01L/19R	2,840.1 metres (9,318 ft) Concrete

Joint Base Andrews (JBA; IATA: ADW, ICAO: KADW, FAA LID: ADW) is a United States military facility located in Prince George's County, Maryland. The facility is under the jurisdiction of the United States Air Force (USAF) 316th Wing, Air Force District of Washington (AFDW). The base was established in 2009, when Andrews Air Force Base and Naval Air Facility Washington were merged.

The base is named for Lieutenant General Frank Maxwell Andrews (1884–1943), former commanding general of United States Armed Forces in the European Theater of Operations during World War II. The base is widely known for serving as the home base of two Boeing VC-25 aircraft which have the call sign Air Force One while the president of the United States is on board.

The host at Andrews is the 316th Wing, assigned to the Air Force District of Washington, which is also headquartered at Andrews. The 316th Wing is responsible for maintaining emergency reaction rotary-wing airlift and other National Capital Region contingency response capabilities critical to national security, and for organizing, training, equipping and deploying combat-ready forces for Air and Space Expeditionary Forces (AEFs). Three other wings at Andrews are the reserve 459th Air Refueling Wing, Air National Guard's 113th Wing and active duty 89th Airlift Wing.

== History ==
=== Andrews Air Force Base ===
In August 1942, President Franklin D. Roosevelt ordered the secretary of war to acquire land to build a military airfield at the present site of Joint Base Andrews, with construction beginning later that year. On 19 April 1943, the first permanent unit arrived, the 463rd Base Headquarters and Air Base Squadron.

Camp Springs Army Air Field became operational on 2 May 1943, when the first Republic P-47 Thunderbolt arrived. Camp Springs became Andrews Field on 2 May 1945 to honor one of the Air Force's founders, Lieutenant General Frank M. Andrews. Shortly after the Air Force became a separate service in 1947, the base's name changed to Andrews Air Force Base.

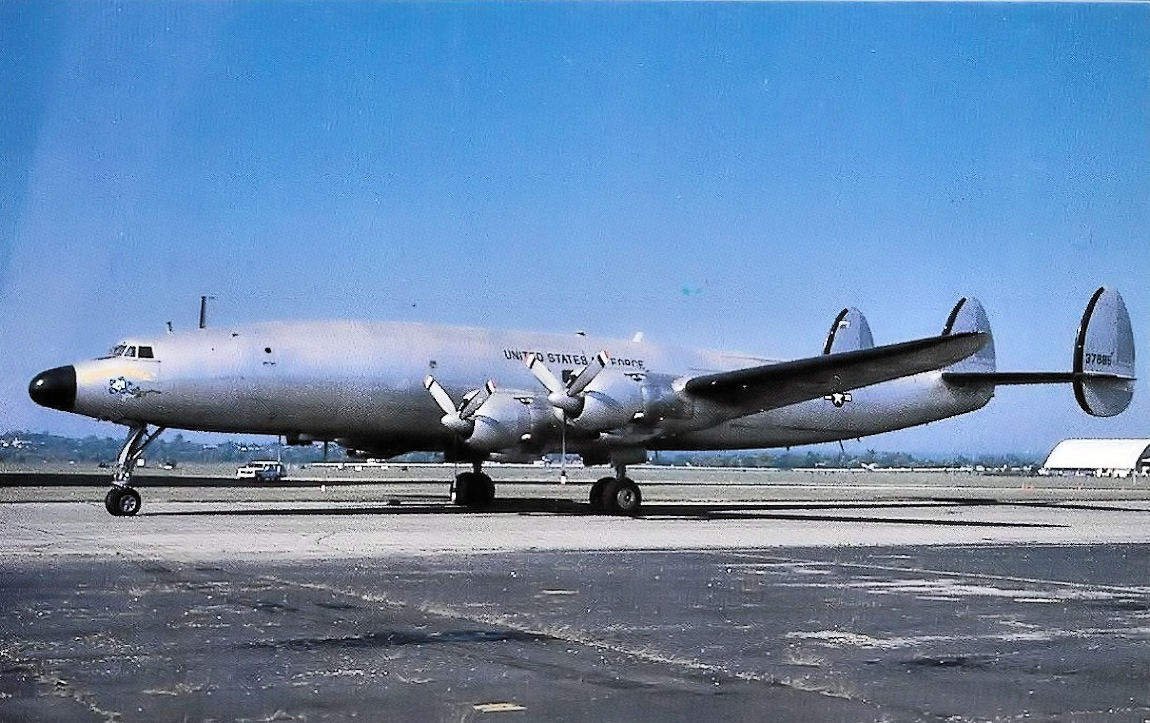
Lockheed VC-121E Super Constellation '53-7885' Colombine III at Andrews AFB during 1960

In the years following World War II, Andrews served as headquarters for Continental Air Command, Strategic Air Command and the Military Air Transport Service. It was also headquarters to the Air Research and Development Command and its successor, the Air Force Systems Command, from 1950 to 1992. Andrews was best known for its special air mission role, the transportation of senior government and military leaders. President Harry S. Truman was the first to fly a presidential flight out of Andrews on 24 November 1946. The port of entry and departure for dignitaries transferred to Andrews AFB in 1959, with Detachment 1 of the 1254th Air Transport Group receiving its first jet aircraft, a Boeing VC-137 Stratoliner the same year. While the president's official aircraft, a Lockeed C-121 Constellation (Columbine III), remained at Washington National Airport, the president often used the new VC-137 for longer trips. President John F. Kennedy's official aircraft, a Douglas VC-118, permanently transferred from Washington National in March 1962, and Andrews officially became the "Home of Air Force One".

=== Naval Air Facility Washington ===
In 1958, when airspace around Naval Air Station Anacostia in Washington, D.C., became too crowded and Anacostia's runways were deemed too short, naval air activities were moved to Andrews Air Force Base to facilitate jet operations with a detachment of T-2V SeaStar jet trainers, the transfer being complete in December 1961.

Throughout the 1960s and into the early 1970s, Navy and Marine Reservists flew the AD-5 Skyraider, FJ-4B Fury, F-8U Crusader, RF-8G Photo Crusader, C-54 Skymaster and C-118 cargo aircraft, SP-2 Neptune aircraft and a variety of others. In April 1972, the Naval Air Reserve was reorganized into two tactical carrier wings (CVW-20 and CVW-30) with supporting transport and patrol squadrons.

In 1989, the Secretary of the Navy signed a new 25-year permit granting NAF Washington continued use of land on Andrews AFB.

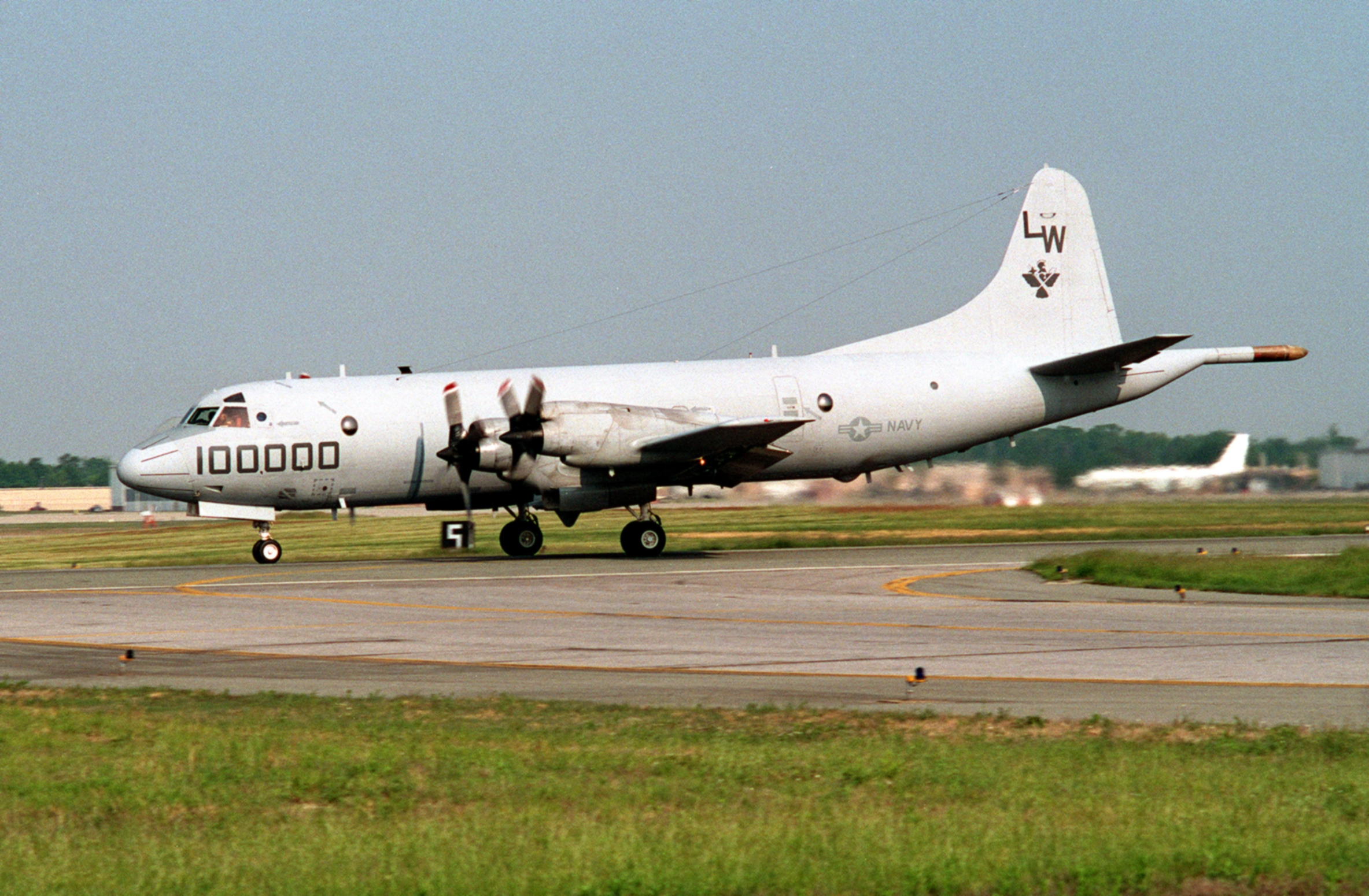
A US Navy Lockheed P-3C of VP-68 Blackhawks, taxiing at NAF Washington during 1994.

At the start of 1993, NAF Washington, D.C., Air Reservists continued to support naval activities with VMFA-321 flying the F/A-18 Hornet, VP-68 flying the P-3C Orion, VAQ-209 flying the EA-6B Prowler, Fleet Logistic Support Wing Detachment flying the C-20 Gulfstream and T-39 Sabreliner, VR-53 flying the C-130 Hercules and the NAF flying the UC-12B for the transportation of VIPs and light cargo.

By October 2006, Navy Operational Support Center (NOSC) Anacostia merged with NAF Washington. With this merger, NAF assumed the additional title of Naval District Washington Reserve Component Command. In September 2007, NOSC Adelphi in Maryland was disestablished and was merged with the reserve center at NAF Washington, creating the largest NOSC in the country.

=== 2005 Base realignment and closure ===
In May 2005, several recommendations relating to Andrews AFB were made by the Base Realignment and Closure (BRAC) Commission. The most significant was to realign Naval Air Facility Washington, by relocating its installation management functions to Andrews AFB, thereby establishing Joint Base Andrews-Naval Air Facility Washington.

BRAC also recommended relocating several offices of the secretary of the Air Force to Andrews from leased office space in Arlington County, Virginia, thereby reducing reliance on leased space and increasing the security of those activities by locating them within a military installation.

Other changes included the relocation of the Air Force Office of Special Investigations (AFOSI) headquarters from Andrews to Marine Corps Base Quantico, Virginia, and the relocation of the Air Force Flight Standards Agency (AFFSA) and its two C-21A to Will Rogers Air National Guard Base, Oklahoma.

On 1 October 2010, following the recommendations of the 2005 Base Realignment and Closure process, the Air Force completed the merger of the 11th Wing and the 316th at Joint Base Andrews. The 11th Wing became the host base organization for Joint Base Andrews. On 11 June 2020, the 11th Wing moved back to its former station of Joint Base Anacostia Bolling and returned responsibility for Andrews to the reactivated 316th Wing, which assumed control of the personnel and units of the 11th Wing.

=== Major commands to which assigned ===
- Air Force District of Washington, since 1 October 2009

=== Major units assigned ===
- 459th Air Refueling Wing, since 2009
- Malcolm Grow Medical Center, since 2009
- 89th Airlift Wing, since 2009
- 113th Wing, since 2009
- 316th Wing, 2009-30 September 2010, 11 June 2020 – present
- Air Force District of Washington, since 2009
- Headquarters, Air Force Office of Special Investigations
- 79th Medical Wing, 2009–2017
- 11th Wing, 2009–2011 June 2020

On 11 June 2020, the 11th Wing moved back to its former station of Joint Base Anacostia Bolling and returned responsibility for Andrews to the reactivated 316th Wing, which assumed control of the personnel and units of the 11th Wing.

== Role and operations ==
=== 316th Wing ===
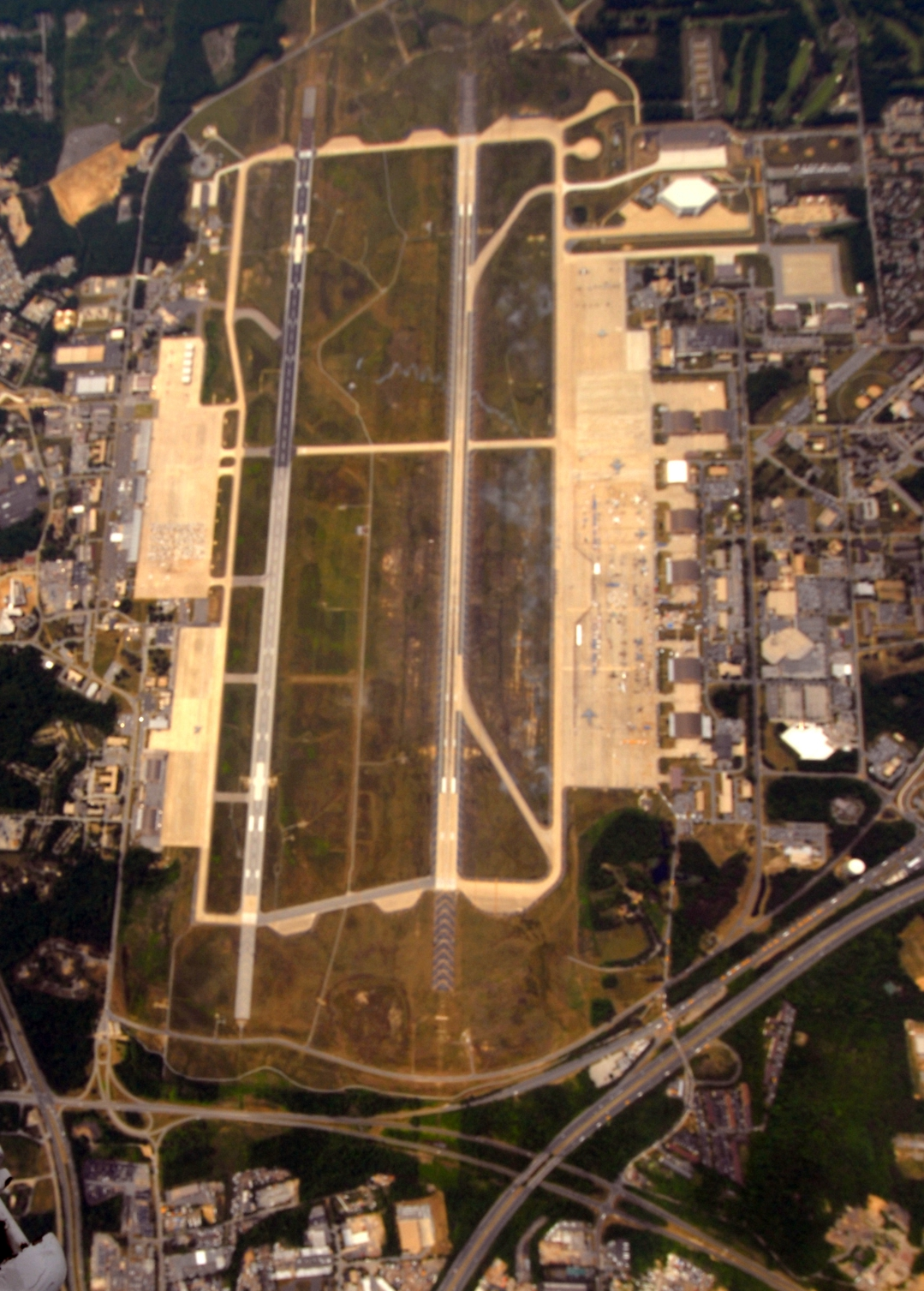
Aerial photo 16 May 2010

The 316th Wing is the host wing for Joint Base Andrews, providing security, personnel, contracting, finance and infrastructure support for five wings, three headquarters, more than 80 tenant organizations, 148 geographically separated units, 6,500 personnel in the Pentagon, as well as 60,000 personnel and families in the National Capital Region and abroad. The wing operates several UH-1N Iroquois helicopters in support of daily and contingency operations in Washington, D.C., and it is also responsible for ceremonial support with the US Air Force Arlington Chaplaincy.

=== 89th Airlift Wing ===
The 89th Airlift Wing part of Air Mobility Command, is responsible for worldwide special air mission airlift, logistics and communications support for the President, Vice President and other senior US leaders. Air Force One is assigned to the 89th AW.

=== District of Columbia Air National Guard ===
The 113th Wing is the air component of the District of Columbia National Guard. Its two flying units are the 121st Fighter Squadron and 201st Airlift Squadron. The 121st Fighter Squadron flies the F-16C/D Fighting Falcon multi-role fighter and provides protection to the airspace surrounding Washington, D.C., and also conducts overseas air-to-air and air-to-ground combat operations. The 201st Airlift Squadron operates the C-38A Courier and C-40C Clipper transport aircraft and provides an airlift capability to high-ranking military, government leadership, Congressional and White House delegations.

=== Air Force District of Washington ===
Air Force District of Washington (AFDW) is the parent command to the 316th Wing and 844th Communications Group and the 11th Wing at Joint Base Anacostia-Bolling. AFDW provides personnel and support for Air Force activities within the National Capital Region (NCR) and approximately 33,000 personnel and civilians performing duties in more than 500 locations across more than 100 countries. The 11th Wing at Anacostia-Bolling is home to the US Air Force Band and US Air Force Honor Guard, and as the host unit, executes critical national security mission support for approximately 70 mission partners. Finally, the 844th Communications Group at Andrews provides communications, information technology systems, services and management to the Department of the Air Force, AFDW, the National Military Command Center, and their tenant units.

== Based units ==
Flying and notable non-flying units based at Joint Base Andrews Naval Air Facility Washington.

=== United States Air Force ===
Air Force District of Washington (AFDW)

- Headquarters Air Force District of Washington
  - 316th Wing (Host Wing)
    - 316th Wing Staff Agencies
    - 316th Comptroller Squadron
    - 316th Operations Group
      - 1st Helicopter Squadron – UH-1N Iroquois (planned HH-60W Jolly Green II)
      - 5th Helicopter Squadron – (planned HH-60W Jolly Green II)
      - 316th Operations Support Squadron
    - 316th Medical Group
      - 316th Aerospace Medical Squadron
      - 316th Dental Squadron
      - 316th Medical Operations Squadron
      - 316th Medical Squadron
      - 316th Medical Support Squadron
      - 316th Surgical Squadron
    - 316th Mission Support Group
      - 316th Civil Engineer Squadron
      - 316th Contracting Squadron
      - 316th Force Support Squadron
      - 316th Logistics Readiness Squadron
    - 316th Security Forces Group
      - 316th Security Forces Squadron
      - 316th Security Support Squadron
      - 816th Security Forces Squadron
  - 844th Communications Group
    - 744th Communications Squadron

Air Mobility Command (AMC)

- Eighteenth Air Force
  - 89th Airlift Wing
    - 89th Airlift Wing Staff Agencies
    - 89th Operations Group
      - 1st Airlift Squadron – C-32A and C-40B
      - 99th Airlift Squadron – C-37A and C-37B
      - 89th Operations Support Squadron
    - Presidential Airlift Group
      - Presidential Airlift Squadron – VC-25A
      - Presidential Logistics Squadron
    - 89th Airlift Support Group
      - 89th Communications Squadron
      - 89th Aerial Port Squadron
    - 89th Maintenance Group

Air Force Materiel Command (AFMC)

- Air Force Installation and Mission Support Center
  - Detachment 5 (GSU)

Air Combat Command (ACC)

- First Air Force
  - Civil Air Patrol-US Air Force (CAP-USAF)
    - Detachment 2 (GSU)

Field Operating Agencies

- Air Force Legal Operations Agency
- Air Force Review Boards Agency
- Air National Guard Readiness Center

Air Force Reserve Command (AFRC)

- Fourth Air Force
  - 459th Air Refueling Wing
    - Headquarters 459th Air Refueling Wing
    - 459th Operations Group
      - 459th Aeromedical Evacuation Squadron
      - 459th Operations Support Squadron
      - 756th Air Refueling Squadron – KC-135R Stratotanker
    - 459th Maintenance Group
      - 459th Aircraft Maintenance Squadron
      - 459th Maintenance Squadron
    - 459th Mission Support Group
      - 69th Aerial Port Squadron
      - 459th Civil Engineering Flight
      - 459th Force Support Squadron
      - 459th Logistics Readiness Squadron
      - 459th Security Forces Squadron
      - 759th Logistics Readiness Flight
    - 459th Aeromedical Staging Squadron
    - 459th Aerospace Medicine Squadron

Air National Guard (ANG)

- District of Columbia Air National Guard
  - 113th Wing
    - 113th Wing Staff Agencies
    - 113th Operations Group
      - 121st Fighter Squadron – F-16C/D Fighting Falcon
      - 201st Airlift Squadron – C-38A Courier and C-40C
      - 113th Operations Support Squadron
      - Air Sovereignty Detachment
    - 113th Maintenance Group
      - 113th Maintenance Squadron
      - 113th Aircraft Generation Squadron
      - 113th Maintenance Operations Flight
    - 113th Medical Group
    - 113th Mission Support Group
      - 113th Civil Engineer Squadron
      - 113th Communications Flight
      - 113th Logistics Readiness Squadron
      - 113th Mission Support Contracting
      - 113th Mission Support Flight
      - 113th Security Forces Squadron
      - 113th Services Flight

Civil Air Patrol (CAP)

- National Headquarters
  - CAP Congressional Squadron (GSU)
- Mid-Atlantic Region
  - National Capital Wing
    - Andrews Composite Squadron (DC-033)

=== United States Army ===
- US Army Military District of Washington
  - US Army Air Operations Group
    - US Army Priority Air Transport – C-37A/B

=== United States Marine Corps ===
US Marine Corps Reserve (USMCR)

- 4th Marine Aircraft Wing
  - Marine Aircraft Group 49
    - Marine Transport Squadron Andrews (VMR Andrews) – UC-35D Citation

=== United States Navy ===
US Navy Reserve Force

- Commander Naval Air Force Reserve (CNAFR)
  - Naval Air Facility Washington
    - Headquarters Naval Air Facility Washington
    - Aviation Support Detachment Washington
  - Commander Fleet Logistics Support Wing
    - Fleet Logistics Support Squadron One (VR-1) – C-37B
    - Fleet Logistics Support Squadron Five Three (VR-53) – C-130T Hercules

Region Mid-Atlantic, Reserve Component Command (RCC)

- Navy Operational Support Center (NOSC) Washington

Commander Fleet Readiness Center (COMFRC)

- Fleet Readiness Center Mid-Atlantic

Tenth Fleet (US Fleet Cyber Command)

- Navy Communication Security Material System (NCMS) Command
  - Information Dominance Corps Region Headquarters

Office of Naval Intelligence

- Kennedy Irregular Warfare Center

=== Maryland State Police ===
Maryland State Police Aviation Command Washington Section

- Trooper 2 Helicopter

== Geography ==
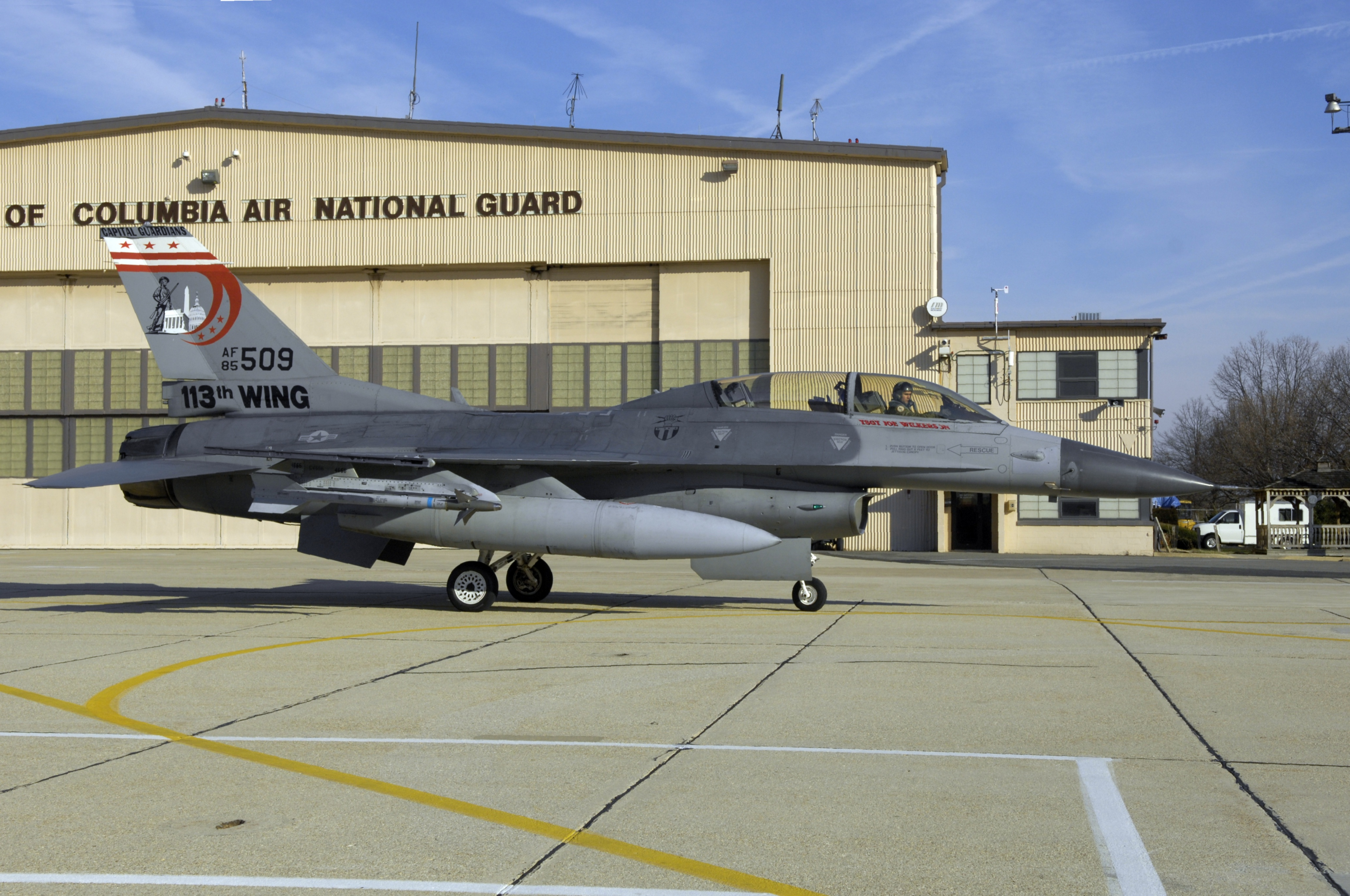
F-16D of the 113th Wing

Joint Base Andrews is situated a few miles southeast of Washington, D.C., near the town of Morningside. It is delineated as a census-designated place by the United States Census Bureau. The CDP has a total area of 6.9 square miles (18.0 km^{2}), of which 6.9 square miles (17.9 km^{2}) is land and 0.04 square miles (0.1 km^{2}), or 0.51%, is water.

There are two runways on the base; the western runway is 11,300 feet (3,400 m) in length, and the eastern runway is 9,750 feet (2,970 m) in length. The minor third runway between them at the top of the picture (above the cross-base roadway) is now closed, and the small T-shaped runway at the bottom right of the opening picture was closed and demolished by 2008.

== Demographics ==
For statistical purposes the base is delineated as a census-designated place (Andrews AFB CDP) by the U.S. Census Bureau. As of the 2020 census, the resident population was 3,025.

== Housing ==
The family housing, privatized, is operated and owned by Liberty Park at Andrews.

=== Facilities for residents ===
The U.S. Postal Service operates the Andrews AFB Post Office.

Joint Base Andrews CDP is served by the Prince George's County Public Schools (PGCPS). Residents of the CDP are zoned to Francis T. Evans Elementary School, Stephen Decatur Middle School, and Dr. Henry A Wise Jr. High School.

Evans Elementary, within the CDP, has a Clinton postal address and opened in 1968. The school is by Virginia Gate. Its namesake is Captain Francis T. Evans, who died when his plane crashed in Prince George's County; according to the school's website, it is believed that he did not bail out since he did not want his aircraft to hit Forestville Elementary School.

There is also a charter school, Imagine Andrews Public Charter School (IAPCS), which opened in 2010. Imagine Schools operates Imagine Andrews, which is a joint venture between it, PGCPS, and Joint Base Andrews. The school reserves 65% of its enrollment spaces for children of military families.

== Expo ==
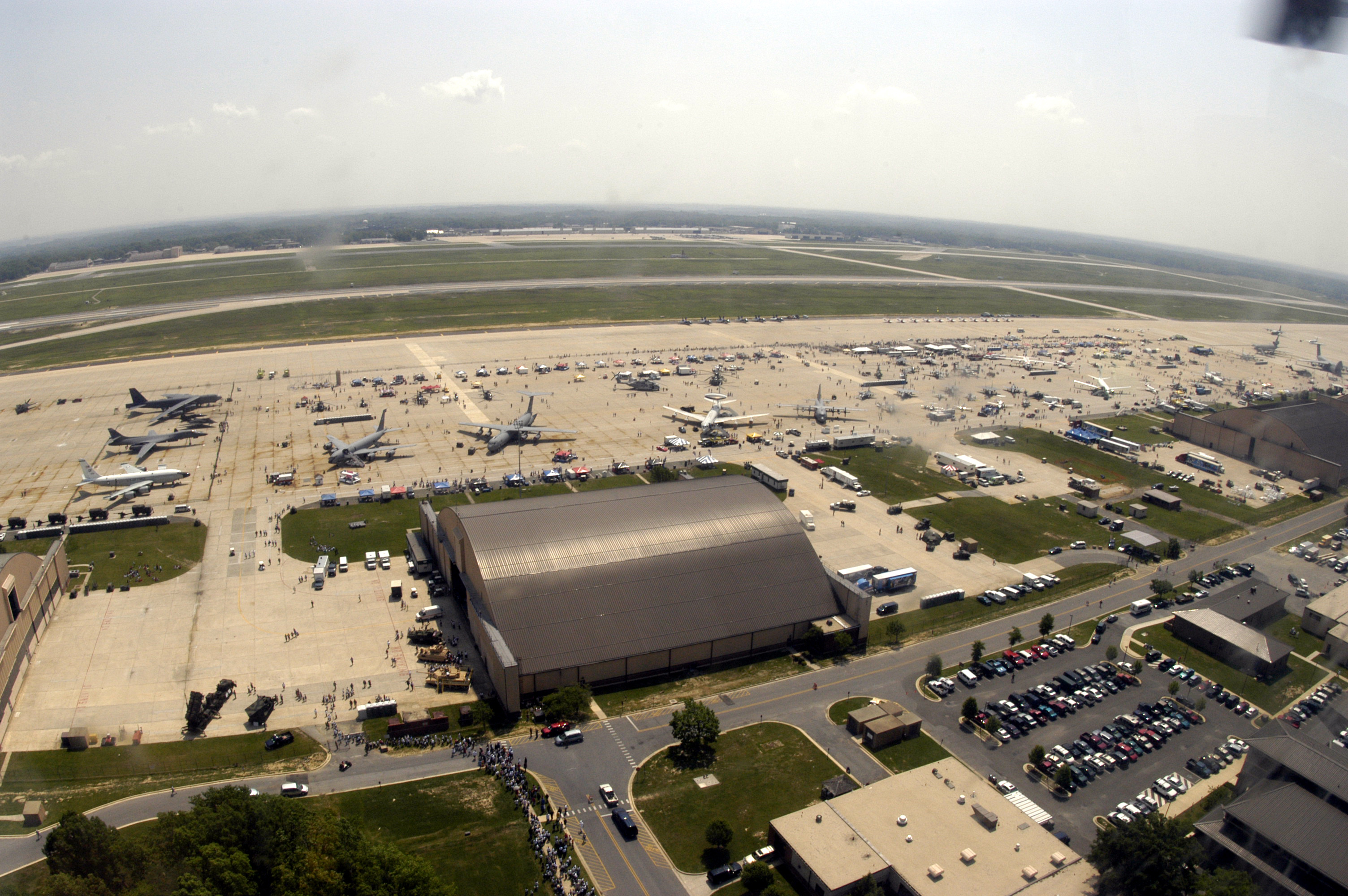
Aerial view of the Andrews flight line in May 2004.

The Joint Base Andrews Air & Space Expo is a free airshow that happens every 2 or more years featuring the United States Air Force Thunderbirds and the Navy's Blue Angels. A variety of presentations from military services and other organizations included the KC-135, the F-16 Fighting Falcon, the Boeing B-52 Stratofortress, and the UH-1N Iroquois.

== Official insignia ==
The installation commander of Joint Base Andrews approved a logo re-design in the spring of 2014, which aimed to improve the branding and the overall appearance of the installation across all platforms. The project took several months and went through numerous design changes before approval, but was finalized in the late summer. The new JBA logo project was led and chiefly designed by Senior Airman Dan Burkhardt with important contributions by Mr. Dean Markos, who were both serving the Air Force in the 11th Wing Public Affairs office. The logo was approved and disseminated across all digital platforms and marketed locally in the fall of 2014.

The new logo was re-designed with a flatter, more modern design aesthetic that could comfortably occupy a number of different mediums, from mobile apps, to installation trucks and signs. Contained in it are a number of design elements that refer directly to the joint mission of the installation, which is home to several Air Force Major Commands, Naval Commands, a Marine detachment and a number of other military and government related units.

=== Design elements ===
- U.S. Capitol Building: The Capitol Building refers to the location of the installation (just outside Washington D.C.) and critical role it plays in supporting the operations and leadership of the U.S. Government.
- Dual Planes with Contrails: The two planes taking off with contrails flowing downward signify the aerial missions that Joint Base Andrews either hosts or supports directly every day, including the operations and maintenance of Air Force One.
- America's Airfield: This phrase (one of several unofficial tag-lines of the installation) refers to the mission-critical role that Joint Base Andrews plays in national defense, government and diplomacy.
- Joint Base Andrews Naval Air Facility Washington: Unlike the previous logo design, the new design incorporates the official name of the installation in the post-BRAC era.

== See also ==
- List of United States Air Force installations

== Notes ==
- Base Realignment and Closure – Volume 1, Part 2 of 2: Detailed Recommendations (PDF). Washington, D.C.: Department of Defense. 2005. Archived from the original (PDF) on 7 June 2011.

Attribution:

This article incorporates public domain material from the Air Force Historical Research Agency
This article incorporates public domain material from the United States Air Force
