= National Capital Wing Civil Air Patrol =

Washington, D.C. Wing Civil Air Patrol
Associated branches
- United States Air Force

Command staff
- Commander: Col William T. Eliason
- Deputy Commander: Lt Col Aaron Newman
- Chief of Staff: Maj Melody Terry

Current statistics
- Cadets: 374
- Seniors: 390
- Total Membership: 764
- Website: natcapwg.cap.gov
- Statistics as of January 2025

The National Capital Wing of the Civil Air Patrol (CAP) is the highest echelon of Civil Air Patrol in the district of Washington, D.C. The National Capital Wing consists of over 760 cadet and adult members at over six locations across the District of Columbia; the City of Alexandria, Arlington County and Fairfax County in Northern Virginia; and Prince George's County, MD.

== Mission ==
The National Capital Wing performs the three missions of the Civil Air Patrol: providing emergency services; offering cadet programs for youth; and providing aerospace education for both CAP members and the general public.

=== Emergency services ===
The Civil Air Patrol provides emergency services, which includes performing search and rescue and disaster relief missions; as well as assisting in humanitarian aid assignments. The CAP also provides Air Force support through conducting light transport, communications support, and low-altitude route surveys. The Civil Air Patrol can also offer support to counter-drug missions.

=== Cadet programs ===
The Civil Air Patrol offers a cadet program for youth aged 12 to 21, which includes aerospace education, leadership training, physical fitness and moral leadership.

=== Aerospace education ===
The Civil Air Patrol offers aerospace education for CAP members and the general public, including providing training to the members of CAP, and offering workshops for youth throughout the nation through schools and public aviation events.

== Resources ==
As of 2019, the National Capital Wing had 4 single-engine aircraft, 10 vehicles, 5 VHF/FM repeaters, 77 VHF/FM stations, and 12 HF stations.

== Organization ==
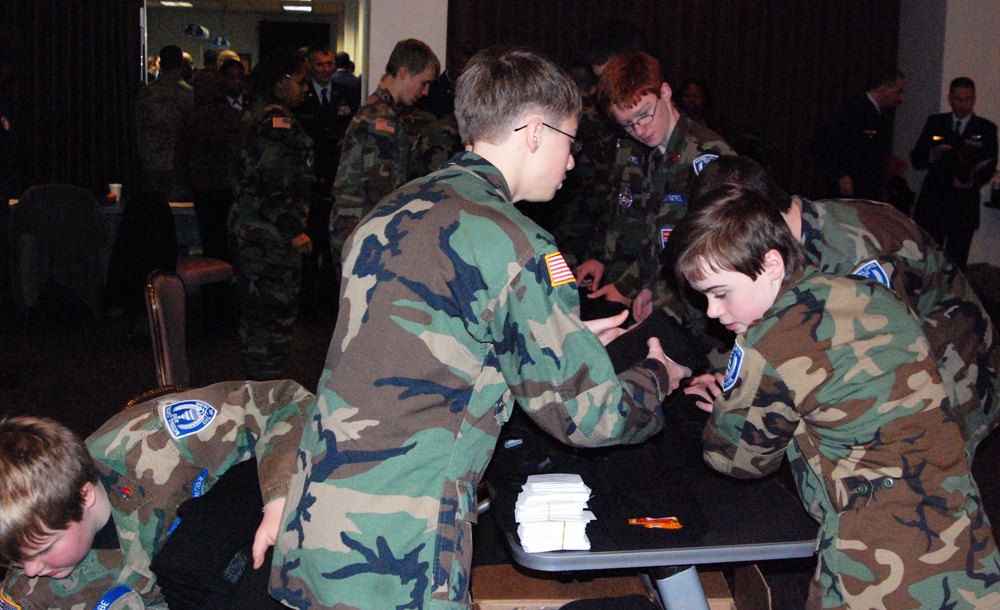
Capital Region Civil Air Patrol cadets prepare to hand out cold weather gear to Airmen from Joint Base Andrews in preparation for the 57th Presidential Inauguration.

Squadrons of the National Capital Wing
Designation	Squadron Name	Location	Notes
DC026	Arlington Composite Squadron	Arlington, VA	
DC033	Andrews Composite Squadron	Joint Base Andrews, MD	
DC045	Mount Vernon Composite Squadron	Fort Belvoir, VA	
DC051	Tuskegee Composite Squadron	Washington, D.C.	Joint Base Anacostia-Bolling
DC053	Fairfax Composite Squadron	Fairfax, VA	
DC060	Challenger 1 Cadet Squadron	Alexandria, VA	

== See also ==
- Awards and decorations of the Civil Air Patrol
- District of Columbia Air National Guard
