= VMFA-321 =

Marine Fighter Attack Squadron 321
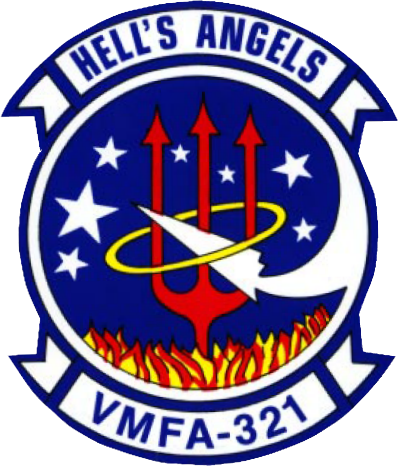
- VMFA-321 Insignia
- Active: 1 February 1943 – 11 September 2004
- Country: United States of America
- Branch: United States Marine Corps
- Type: Fighter/Attack
- Role: Close air support Air interdiction Aerial reconnaissance
- Part of: Deactivated
- Nicknames: "Hell’s Angels" "Black Barons"
- Tail Code: MG
- Engagements: World War II

Marine Fighter Attack Squadron 321 (VMFA-321) was a United States Marine Corps fighter squadron consisting of F/A-18 Hornets. Known as "Hell’s Angels", the squadron participated in action during World War II and was then transferred to the Marine Forces Reserve. The squadron was decommissioned on 11 September 2004.

== History ==
=== World War II ===
VMF-321 was established 1 February 1943 at Marine Corps Air Station Cherry Point, North Carolina, as a unit of Marine Aircraft Group 31, 3rd Marine Aircraft Wing. After a crash course in tactics and maneuvers, the squadron was off to the war in the South Pacific. They were initially stationed at Barakoma Airfield on Vella Lavella, a recently captured island base in the Solomon Islands.

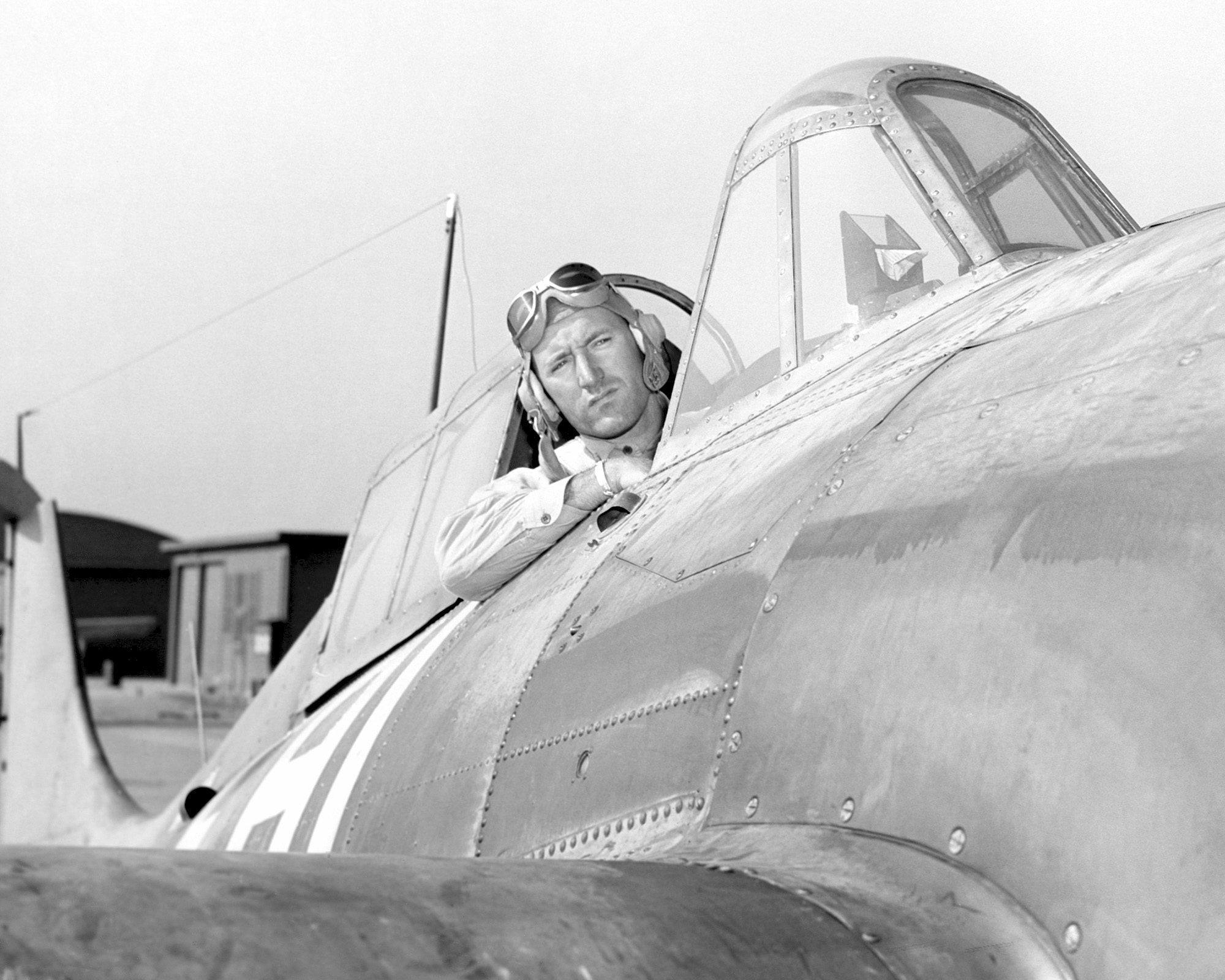
VMF-321 CO and ace Major Overend in 1945.

First Lieutenant Robert B. See made the squadron's first kill four days after arriving on the island. While in the Solomons, the "Hell's Angels" amassed a record of 39 kills of Japanese aircraft and an additional 11 probables, with only eight aircraft lost. At one time the squadron was scoring at least one kill and/or one probable a day with its F4U Corsair aircraft. Captain J. R. Norman, assisted by wingman Lieutenant Philip B. Talbott, once downed four planes in a single day.

Major Edmund F. Overend, the squadron's Commanding Officer, who had come to the squadron with 5.83 credited kills from his services with the American Volunteer Group in China, accounted for three more confirmed kills.

The squadron transferred north to the area around Guam, where pilots took over "milk run" bombings of neighboring islands and played a major role in knocking out Japanese bases from which attacks against American bomber bases were being launched.

=== The Cold War ===
After the war, the squadron returned home and was deactivated on 28 January 1946. Early in 1946 a group of Marine aviators in the Washington, D.C. area began organizing a reserve fighting squadron from the ranks of pilots, officers, and enlisted members who had served together in the war as VMF-321. This new VMF-321 became an organized Marine Corps Reserve fighting squadron in July 1946 at Naval Air Station Anacostia, Maryland, and was assigned 14 Corsair aircraft similar to the ones flown by the squadron during the war.

On 1 April 1949, Marine Fighting Squadron 321 was redesignated Marine Fighter Squadron 321. The squadron was placed on alert 13 January 1951 and was activated on 1 March 1951 flying the F8F Bearcat during the Korean War. The 164-man unit began an intensive training program under the command of Major George Robertshaw, in preparation for deployment to the Far East. The squadron did not go to Korea as a unit. Instead it was declared an augmentation squadron and its members were assigned to regular Marine units to fill empty billets.

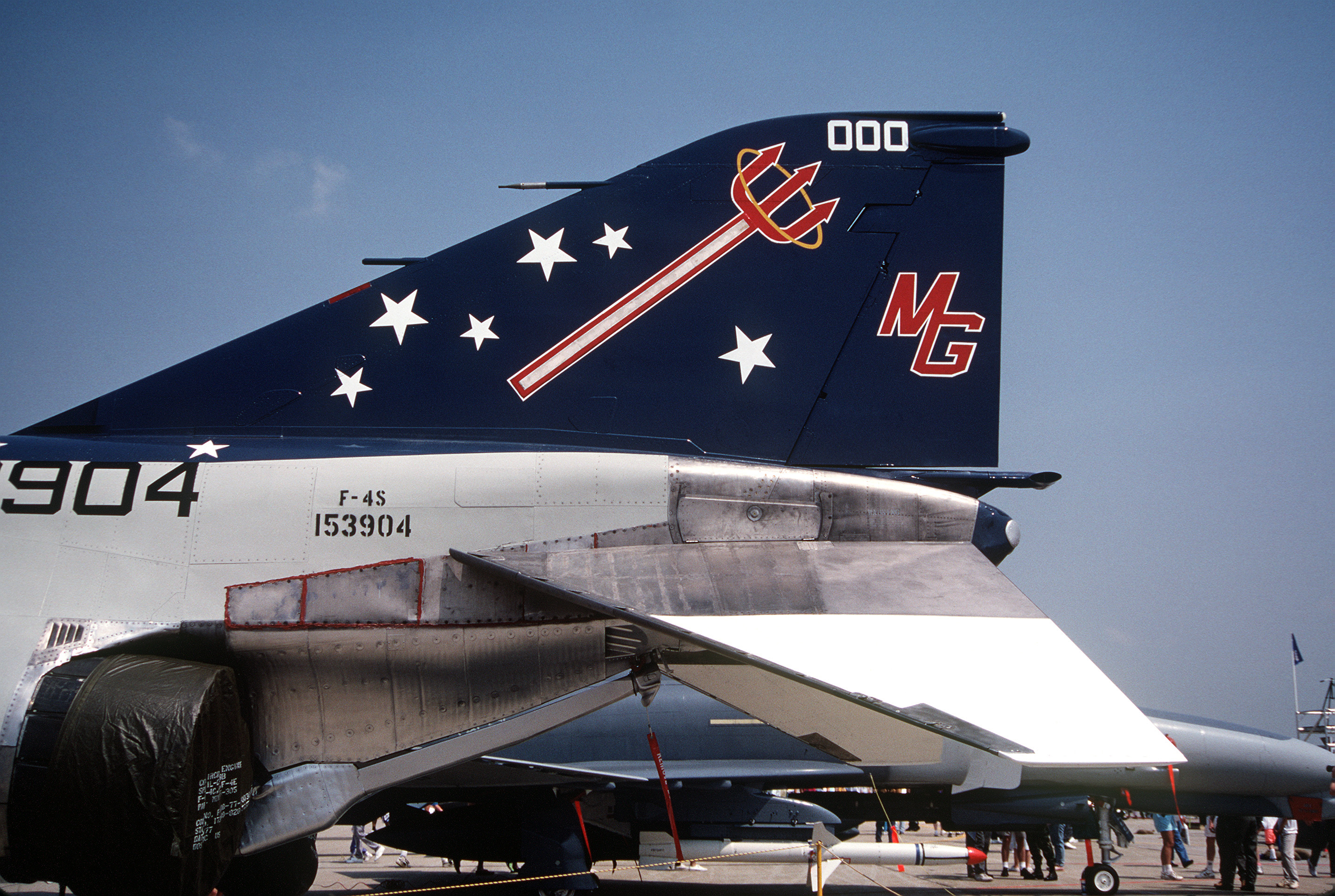
Colourful Phantom tail markings.

In the 1950s, the squadron flew the A-1 Skyraider and on 15 May 1958 they were redesignated Marine Attack Squadron 321 (VMA-321). In 1962, NAS Anacostia ceased fixed-wing flying operations and both it and adjacent Bolling AFB's runways closed due to airspace and traffic pattern conflicts with Washington National Airport. NAS Anacostia then became Naval Support Facility Anacostia with heliport operations only. At this point, all assigned USN and USMC flying units, to include VMA-321, relocated to nearby Andrews AFB, Maryland and the newly established Naval Air Facility Washington. On 1 July 1962, the squadron again became VMF-321 when it began flying the FJ-4B Fury. This was followed by a transition to the F-8 Crusader in January 1965.

In October 1973. a new paint scheme, consisting of a black dorsal and vertical stabilizer prompted a temporary nickname changed to the "Black Barons". However, the squadron shortly returned to the "Hell's Angels" adding a pitchfork running through the " MG" on the vertical stabilizer.

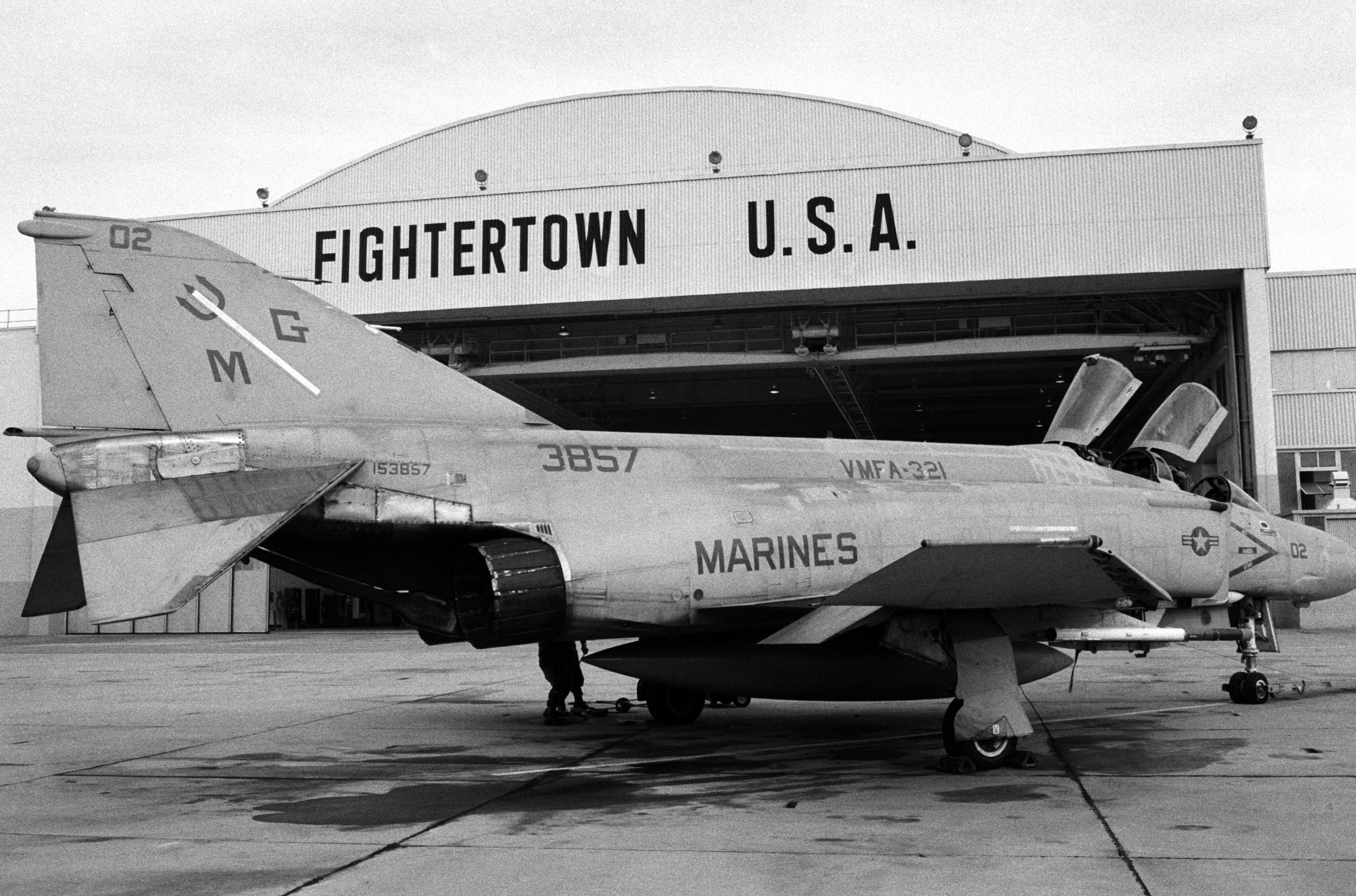
An F-4S of VMFA-321 at NAS Miramar in 1987.

Marine Fighter Squadron 321 was redesignated Marine Fighter Attack Squadron VMFA-321 in December 1973, when it became the first Marine Air Reserve squadron to receive the F-4 Phantom II aircraft. The designation, which remains today, indicated the dual fighter/attack mission. Aircrew and maintenance personnel began preparing for the new aircraft long before its arrival, and on 15 January 1974, VMFA-321 made its first Phantom flight.

Reservists from VMFA-321 appeared in a film produced for recruiting personnel into the Marine Corps Air Reserves. The film, which featured actor and former Marine Christopher George, was produced in the summer of 1976 at Andrews Air Force Base by J. Walter Thompson, which has held the Marine Corps recruiting account contract for decades.

In 1985, VMFA-321 operated twelve F-4S Phantom aircraft and accumulated 12,344 mishap free hours. During the calendar year the squadron flew nearly 3,000 hours in support of a demanding aircrew training program. VMFA-321 was nominated for the Chief of Naval Operations Safety Award.

=== 1990–2004 ===
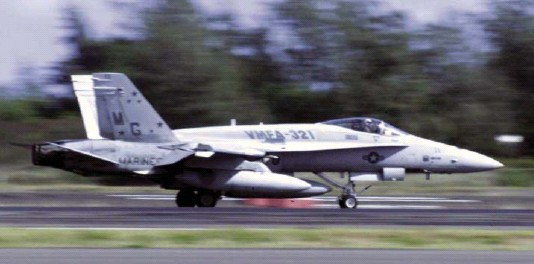
An F/A-18A of VMFA-321, 2004

In 1991, VMFA-321 stood down the Phantom and commenced transitioning to the F/A-18 Hornet. During 1996, they deployed to Norway and Scotland. 1998 found them back in Scotland. 1999 sent the Hells Angels to Egypt. 2000 was a third and final deployment to Scotland. 2001 saw the squadron report to NAF Washington on 12 September without prior notice. The squadron reported mission ready with 6 aircraft and pilots ready for CAP missions and actually launched sorties in support of what would become Operational Noble Eagle. The squadron was chosen for deactivation as part of the Department of the Navy’s Tactical Air Integration Plan. And after a final deployment to Karup, Denmark in June 2004, they officially stood down on 11 September 2004. Shortly after this the last CO of the squadron flew the last remaining plane belonging to the squadron to Quantico MCB where he crashed the plane on its final landing. The aircraft, which was the first Marine Corps aircraft to respond after the 9/11 attacks was repaired and sat on display at TBS (The Basic School) until it went under restoration. It now appears in the National Museum of the Marine Corps in Quantico with VMFA-115 markings.

== See also ==
- United States Marine Corps Aviation
- List of decommissioned United States Marine Corps aircraft squadrons
