= NAFW =

NAFW is an acronym for:

- National Assembly for Wales
- Naval Air Facility Washington
