= Naval Air Facility Washington =

US Navy airfield near Camp Springs, Maryland, United States

- Camp Springs, Maryland in the United States of America
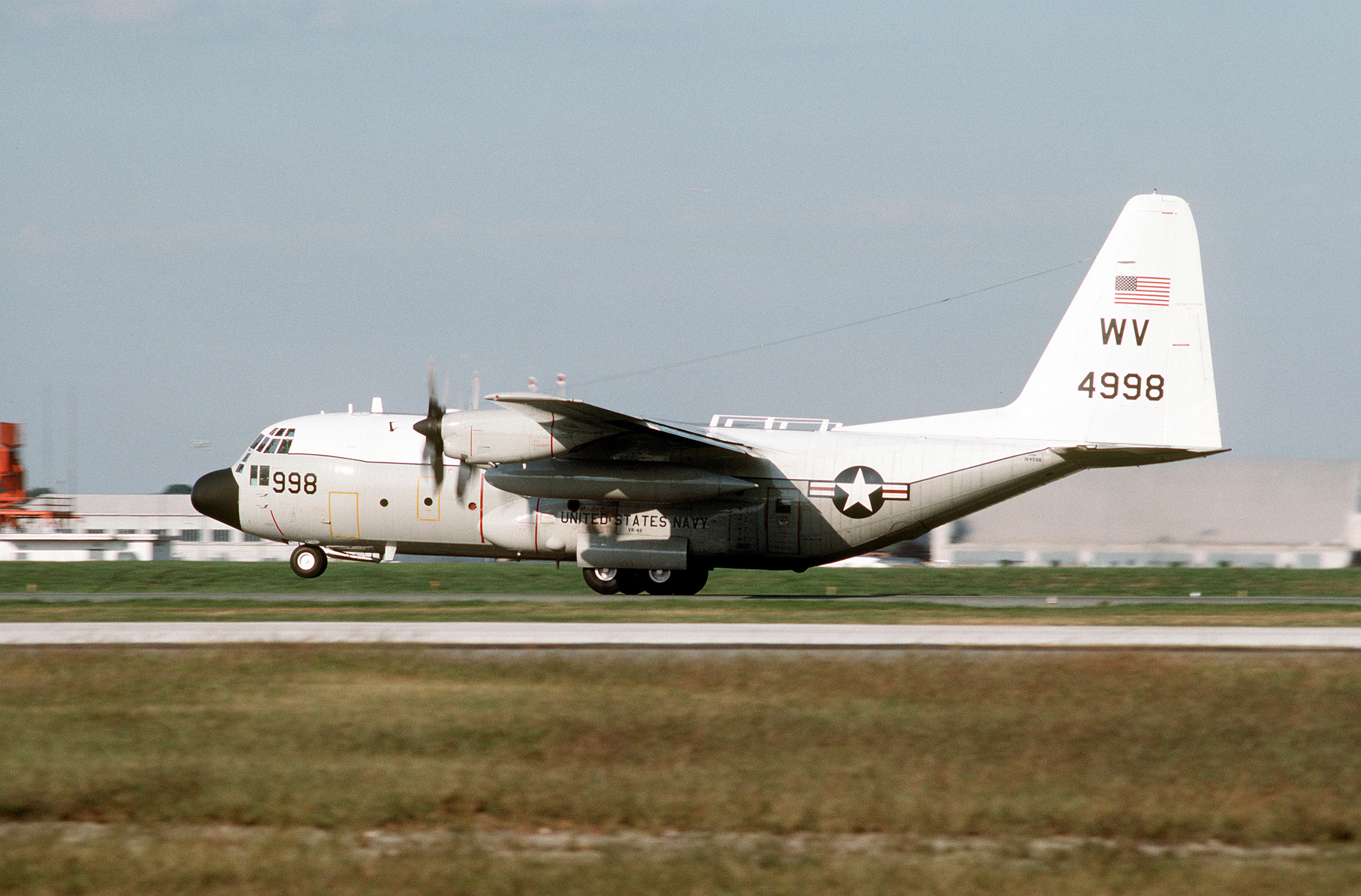
- A US Navy Lockheed C-130T Hercules of Transport Squadron 48 (VR-48) takes off from NAF Washington DC during 1993.

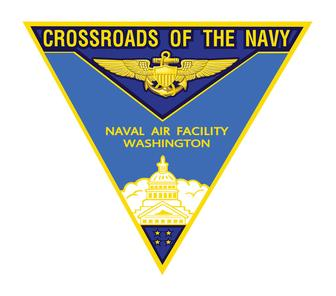
- Shield of NAF Washington

Site information
- Type: Naval Air Facility
- Owner: Department of Defense
- Operator: US Navy

Location
- Location in the United States
- Coordinates: 38°48′39″N 076°52′01″W

Site history
- Built: 1958 – 1961
- In use: 1958 – 1 October 2009
- Fate: Merged in 2009 to become an element of Joint Base Andrews-Naval Air Facility Washington

Airfield information
- Identifiers: IATA: NSF, ICAO: KNSF, FAA LID: NSF
- Elevation: 85.3 metres (280 ft) AMSL
Runways
| Direction | Length and surface |
|---|---|
| 01R/19L | 2,973.6 metres (9,756 ft) Asphalt/Concrete |
| 01L/19R | 2,840.1 metres (9,318 ft) Concrete |
- Note: Runways shared with Andrews AFB.

Naval Air Facility Washington or NAF Washington is a United States Naval Reserve installation located near Camp Springs, Maryland. The facility was established at Andrews Air Force Base in 1958. As part of the 2005 Base Realignment and Closure (BRAC) program, it merged with Andrews Air Force Base in 2009, to create Joint Base Andrews-Naval Air Facility Washington.

== History ==
=== Establishment ===
In 1958 when airspace around Naval Air Station Anacostia in Washington, D.C became too crowded and Anacostia's runways were deemed too short, the naval air activities were moved to Andrews Air Force Base to facilitate jet operations with a detachment of T-2V SeaStar jet trainers. An A-4 Skyhawk became the last jet aircraft to fly out of NAS Anacostia on 25 January 1962 with the transfer to Andrews AFB being complete in December 1961. Captain Frank D. Heyer transferred his command from Anacostia to Andrews, concurrent with the commissioning of the new Naval Air Facility (NAF), Washington D.C.

=== Cold War ===
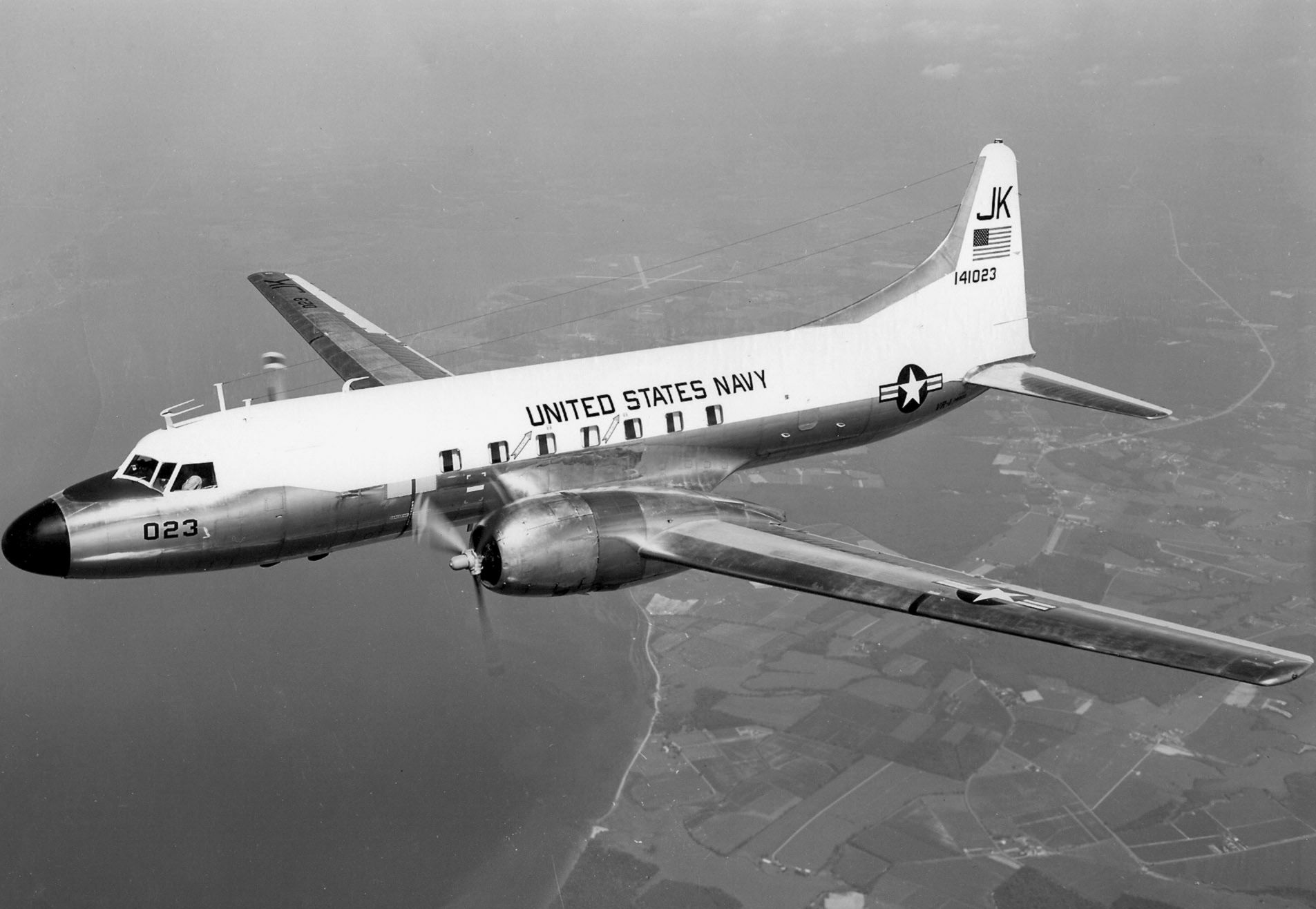
A US Navy C-131F Samaritan from VR-1 Star Lifters in flight during 1965, whilst based at NAF Washington.

Throughout the 1960s and into the early 1970s, Navy and Marine Reservists flew the AD-5 Skyraider, FJ-4B Fury, F-8U Crusader, RF-8G Photo Crusader, C-54 Skymaster and C-118 cargo aircraft, SP-2 Neptune aircraft and a variety of others. Tenant squadrons to the NAF at that time included VR-661/662, VF-661/662, VP-661/662/663, and VS-661/662.

Prior to 1970, NAF Washington was custodian to all aircraft at the facility. This 'aircraft custodian' practice, common throughout the Naval Air Reserve, required tenant squadrons to "rent" the aircraft from the NAF on their respective drill weekends. Maintenance and flying responsibilities of NAF aircraft were shared by all Reserve squadrons (including Marine units).

In April 1972, the Naval Air Reserve was reorganized into two tactical carrier wings (CVW-20 and CVW-30) with supporting transport and patrol squadrons. With this reorganization, squadrons became custodians of their own aircraft and the NAF was assigned aircraft for utility and training purposes with their primary mission of training Selected Reservists. NAF became home to VFP-206, VFP-306, VR-52, VP-68 and 20 other tactical and non-tactical units. From 1976, the logistics support mission of NAF Washington included administrative transport flight operations and transient service support of arriving aircraft.

On 1 May 1978, NAF Washington was transferred to Commander, Navy Reserve Force. It accepted its first UC-12B on 25 July 25 1981. In 1989, the Secretary of the Navy signed a new 25 year permit granting NAF Washington continued use of land on Andrews AFB. In 1991, for the first time since the Vietnam War, NAF Reservists were recalled to active duty in support of the Gulf War.

=== Post-Cold War ===
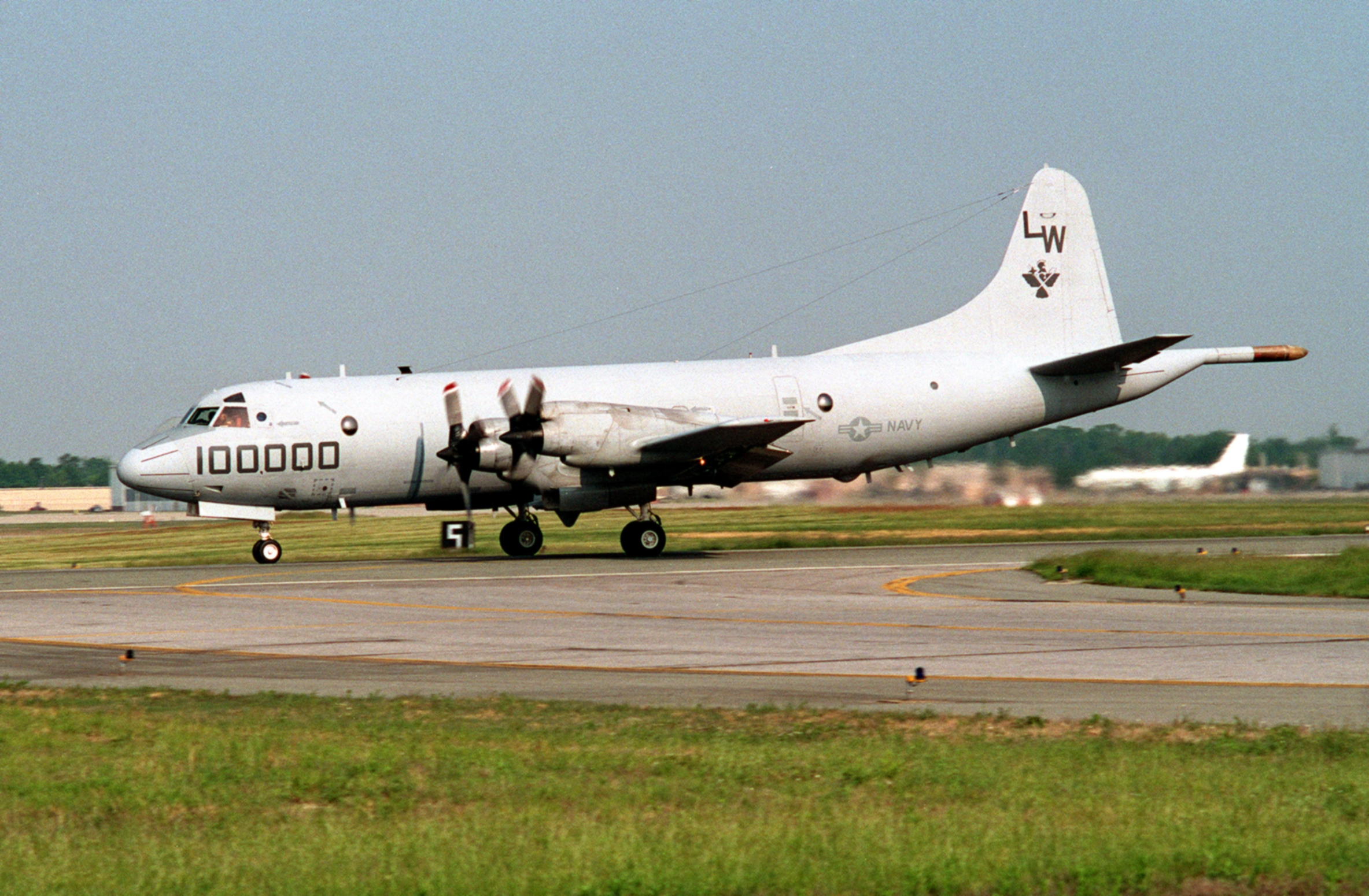
A US Navy Lockheed P-3C of VP-68 Blackhawks, taxing at NAF Washington during 1994.

At the start of 1993, NAF Washington D.C. Air Reservists continued to support naval activities with VMFA-321 flying the F/A-18 Hornet, VP-68 flying the P-3C Orion, VAQ-209 flying the EA-6B Prowler, Fleet Logistic Support Wing Detachment flying the C-20 Gulfstream and T-39 Sabreliner, VR-53 flying the C-130 Hercules and the NAF flying the UC-12B for the transportation of VIPs and light cargo.

By October 2006, Navy Operational Support Center (NOSC) Anacostia merged with NAF Washington. With this merger, NAF assumed the additional title of Naval District Washington Reserve Component Command. In September 2007, NOSC Adelphi in Maryland was disestablished and was merged with the reserve center at NAF Washington, creating the largest NOSC in the country.

=== Merger ===
As part of the 2005 Base Realignment and Closure (BRAC) program, it was recommended that Naval Air Facility Washington and Andrews Air Force Base, became a joint base known as Joint Base Andrews-Naval Air Facility Washington, or Joint Base Andrews for short. The merger was effective from 1 October 2009, when the joint base was established, with the US Air Force being the lead organization providing management and support services for both installations.

Although sharing parallel runways, NAF Washington was originally considered a separate air installation and maintained a separate Navy/Marine Corps–unique FAA airfield identifier of NSF and an ICAO airfield identifier of KNSF. Prior to merging, these separate airfield identifiers were discontinued on 29 March 2009 and all flight operations in and out of NAF Washington now use the Andrews AFB airfield identifiers of ADW and KADW as appropriate.

== Joint Base Andrews ==
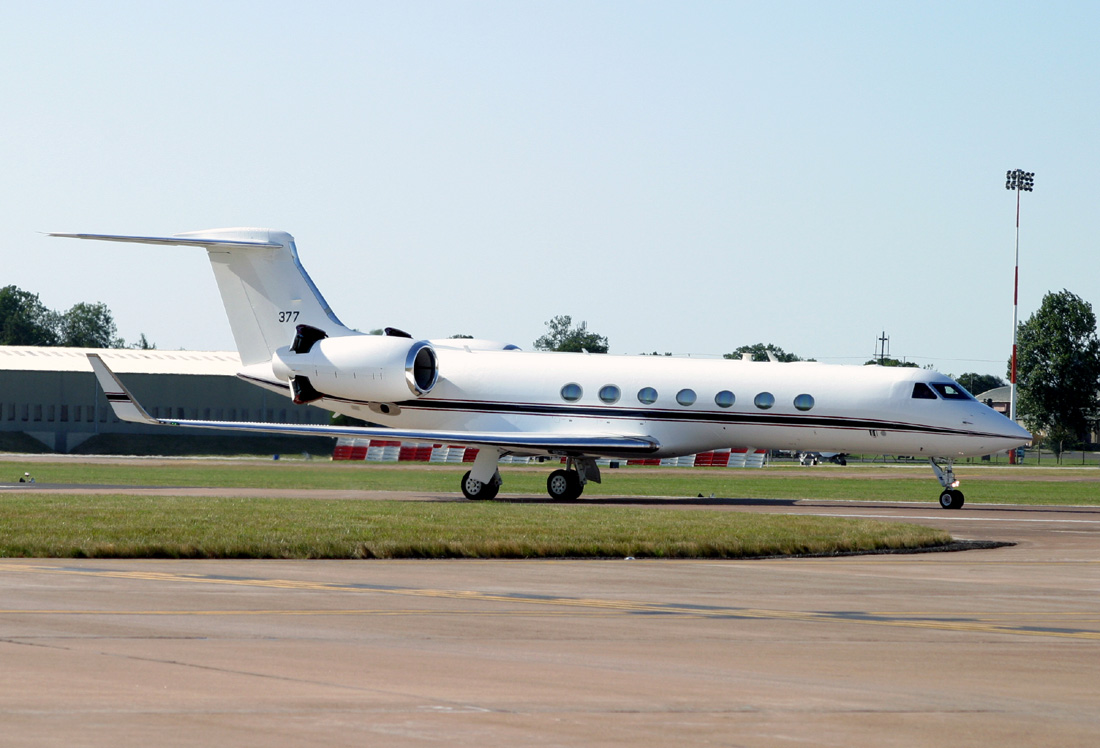
A US Navy C-37B Gulfstream of the type operated by VR-1, based at Joint Base Andrews.

Naval Air Facility Washington (NAFW) maintains a Joint Partnership as the supported component of Joint Base Andrews-NAF Washington.

As a result of BRACs between 1988 and 2015 that closed seven other Navy Reserve (formerly Naval Reserve)-controlled naval air stations and naval air facilities across the United States, NAF Washington is one of only three remaining Navy Reserve air installations in the United States. It is subordinate to Commander Naval Air Force Reserve head-quartered in San Diego, CA. Its mission is training and readiness support for twelve Navy and US Marine Corps commands aboard NAF Washington in order to deploy forces globally.

Effective from 1 June 2014, whilst still remaining part of Joint Base Andrews, NAF Washington was realigned to report to the Commander Naval Air Force Reserve (CNAFR), and NOSC Washington was established to report to Region Mid-Atlantic, Reserve Component Command (RCC).
