= VP-68 =

Patrol Squadron 68
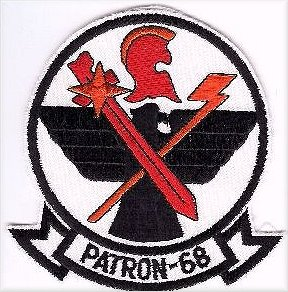
- VP-68 patch
- Active: 1 November 1970-16 January 1997
- Country: United States of America
- Branch: United States Navy Reserve
- Type: squadron
- Role: Maritime patrol
- Nickname(s): Blackhawks

Aircraft flown
- Patrol: SP-2H Neptune; P-3A/B/C Orion

VP-68 was a Patrol Squadron of the U.S. Navy Reserve. The squadron was established on 1 November 1970 at NAS Patuxent River, Maryland. Its home port moved to Naval Air Facility Washington in 1985. The squadron was disestablished on 16 January 1997, after 26 years of service. Its nickname was the Blackhawks from 1972 onward. Elements of the squadron made 28 major overseas deployments.

== Operational history ==
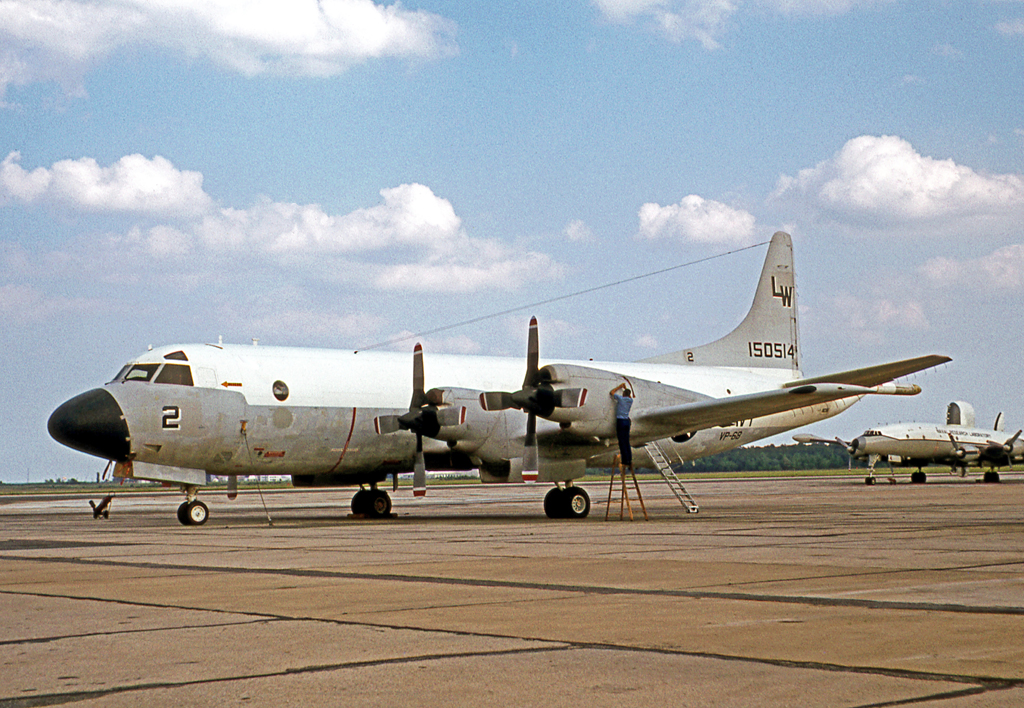
VP-68 P-3A at NAS Patuxent River, May 1972

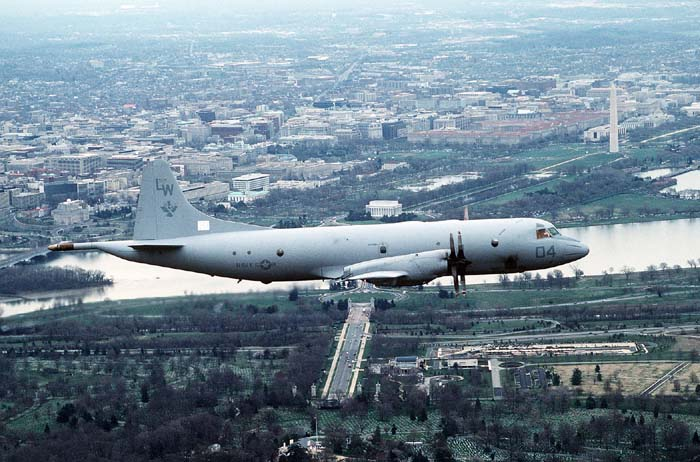
VP-68 P-3 over Washington D.C.

- 1 Nov 1970: VP-68 was established at NAS Patuxent River, Maryland, as a Naval Air Reserve land-based patrol squadron flying the SP-2H Neptune. The new squadron came under the operational and administrative control of Commander, Naval Air Reserve Forces, Atlantic and Commander, Fleet Air Reserve Wings, Atlantic. VP-68 was established as a result of a major reorganization of Naval Air Reserves that took place in mid-1970. Under the Reserve Force Squadron concept 12 land-based naval reserve patrol squadrons were formed and structured along the lines of regular Navy squadrons with nearly identical organization and manning levels. The 12/2/1 concept had 12 VP squadrons under two commands, COMFAIRESWINGLANT and COMFAIRESWINGPAC. These two commands came under the control of one central authority, Commander Naval Air Reserve. The new squadron was composed of elements of pre-existing reserve squadrons, VP-68A1 and VP-68A2 based at NAS Anacostia, D.C.
- 1971: VP-68 became the first East Coast reserve squadron to transition from the SP-2H to the P-3A Orion.
- July–August 1973: VP-68 were deployed to Naval Station Rota, Spain. VP-68 became the first P-3A reserve squadron to operate in the Mediterranean, the Bay of Cádiz and the Straits of Gibraltar.
- July–August 1975: VP-68 was the first reserve squadron to perform mini-det annual active duty for training while deployed to NAF Lajes, Azores. The squadron's aircrews were assigned under the operational control of fleet commanders and were tasked with operational readiness standards equal to that of the fleet.
- 3 May 1980: VP-68 were tasked with forming a detachment to assist in the search and patrol operations in the waters between Florida and Cuba during the Cuban Refugee Crisis. USS Saipan, several other Navy ships and all available patrol squadrons provided humanitarian search and rescue support operations for the vast sealift of Cuban refugees heading for the U.S. through the Florida Straits. Navy ships had been diverted from the annual combined training exercise Solid Shield to undertake the mission. VP-68 detachment's operations were concluded on 17 May 1980, resulting in the award of the Humanitarian Service Medal to the unit.
- August 1983: VP-68 became the first Reserve patrol squadron to drop a live armed MK-46 torpedo.
- August 1984: VP-68 received their first P-3B TAC/NAV MOD aircraft and began transition training on the new aircraft. The TAC/NAV MOD had more powerful engines and improved avionics. The IRDS/HACLS modifications in 1982 added infrared detection and Harpoon launch capability to the aircraft. This modernization of aircraft was in line with the Navy policy of keeping the Reserve Force operationally compatible with their active duty counterparts.
- 1 April 1985: VP-68 was relocated from NAS Patuxent River to NAF Washington, Maryland to make room at NAS Patuxent River for the Bell Boeing V-22 Osprey tilt-rotor V/STOL program. During the relocation, the squadron continued the transition from the P-3A to the P-3B TAC/NAV MOD airframe, completing the task in November 1985.
- April 1991: VP-68 received its first P-3C Update I for transition training, with the last of the squadron's eight aircraft being received in November 1991. Transition training was completed in December 1992. The P-3C UI had a seven-fold increase in computer memory, an Omega navigation system, improved DIFAR and additional tactical display sensor stations.
- June 1992: A five-crew detachment deployed for a two-week ADT while the remainder of the squadron completed P-3C UI transition training at NAF Washington.
- March–April 1993: A four-crew detachment deployed to NS Rota, Spain, and NAS Sigonella, Sicily, to participate in Operation Maritime Guard. Crews five, two and ten followed this detachment at one-week intervals. Operation Maritime Guard was conducted in support of UN resolutions directed at the former states of Yugoslavia.
- 15 May 1994: The squadron became the first in the reserve patrol aviation community to reach the 100,000 mishap-free flight hour mark.
- October 1994: VP-68 received its first P-3C UII.5 aircraft and began transition training while the remaining seven assigned P-3C UI aircraft were being replaced. The P-3C UII.5 had improved electronics systems, new Integrated Acoustic Communication System, improved MAD, standardized wing pylons and improved wing fuel tank venting.
- April–May 1995: VP-68 deployed to NAS Sigonella, in support of UN Operation Sharp Guard sanctions against the former Yugoslav republics. During the eight-week period the squadron flew 670 hours, including 46 armed missions.
- 16 January 1997: The squadron was disestablished at NAF Washington.

== Aircraft assignment ==
The squadron first received the following aircraft on the dates shown:

- SP-2H Neptune – November 1970
- P-3A Orion – 1971
- P-3B TAC/NAV MOD Orion – August 1984
- P-3C UI Orion – April 1991
- P-3C UII.5 Orion – October 1994

== See also ==
- Maritime patrol aircraft
- List of Lockheed P-3 Orion variants
- List of inactive United States Navy aircraft squadrons
- List of United States Navy aircraft squadrons
- List of squadrons in the Dictionary of American Naval Aviation Squadrons
- History of the United States Navy
