= Coast Guard Station Washington, D.C. =

Coast Guard Station Washington
- Part of Joint Base Anacostia–Bolling
- Southwest, Washington, D.C. in the United States
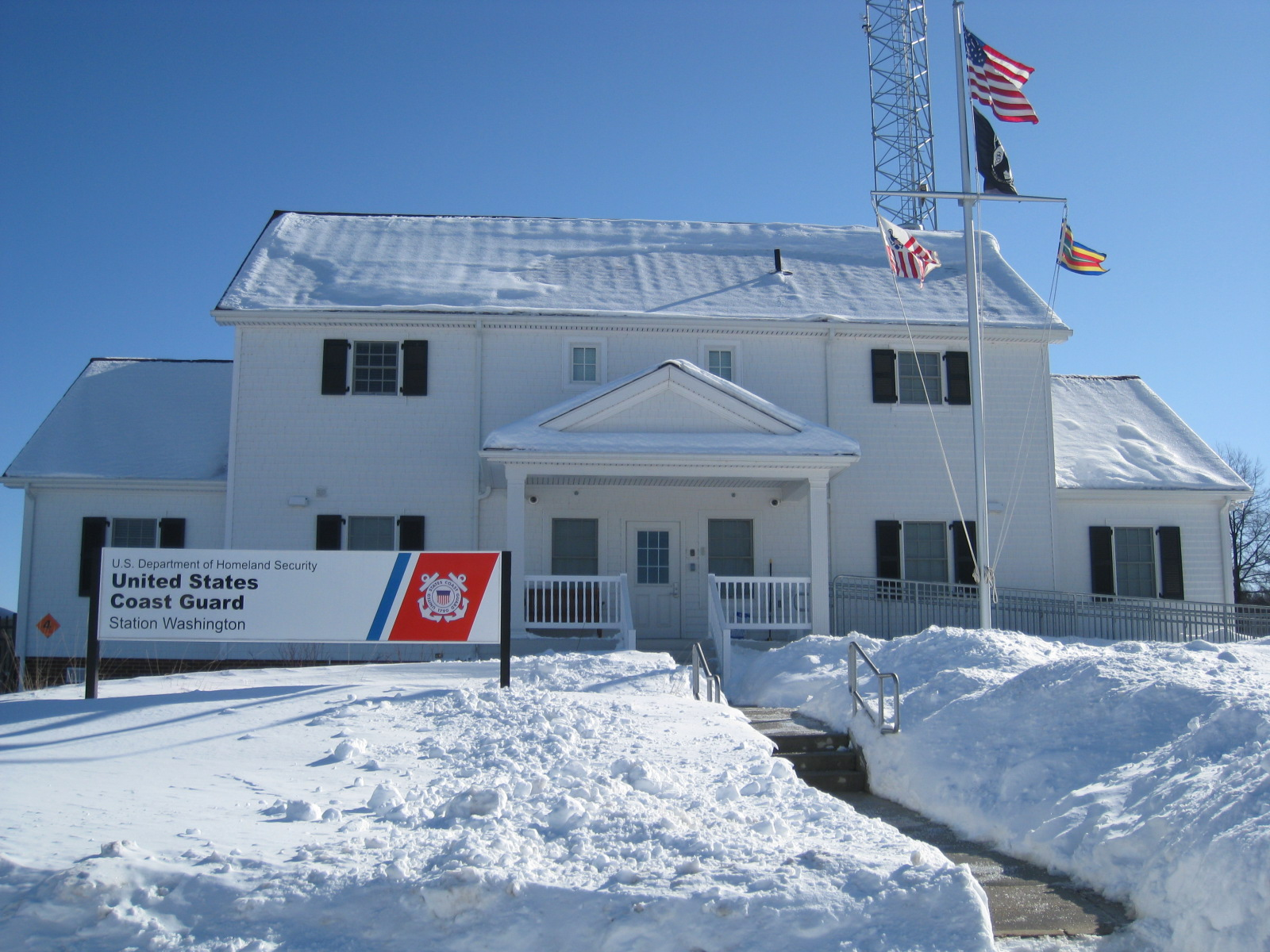
- Coast Guard Station Washington during February 2010

Site information
- Type: Coast Guard Station
- Owner: Department of Homeland Security
- Operator: United States Coast Guard
- Controlled by: Sector Maryland-National Capital Region
- Condition: Operational
- Website: Official website

Location
- Location in the United States
- Coordinates: 38.833123°N 77.022809°W

Site history
- Built: 2003
- In use: 2003 – present

United States Coast Guard Station Washington is a United States Coast Guard station located on Joint Base Anacostia–Bolling in Washington, D.C. The station was commissioned on September 23, 2003.
