= Joint Base Anacostia–Bolling =

US military installation in Washington, DC

- Southwest Washington, D.C. in the United States
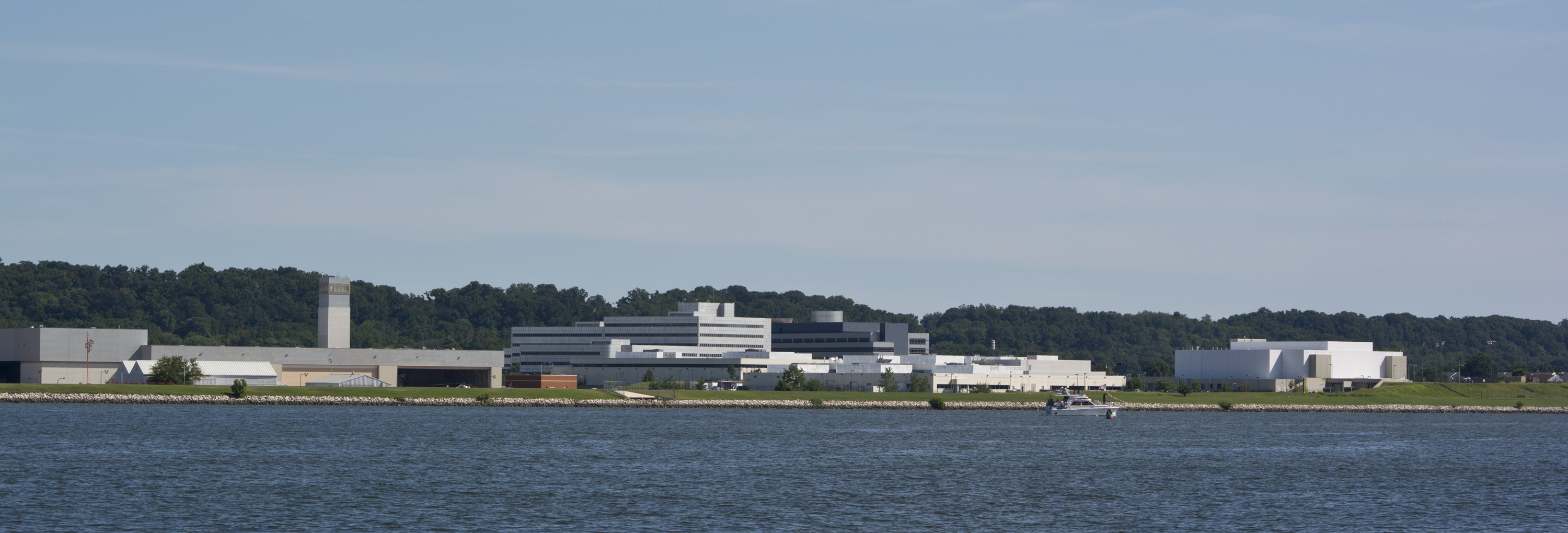
- View of Joint Base Anacostia–Bolling from across the Potomac River during 2013.

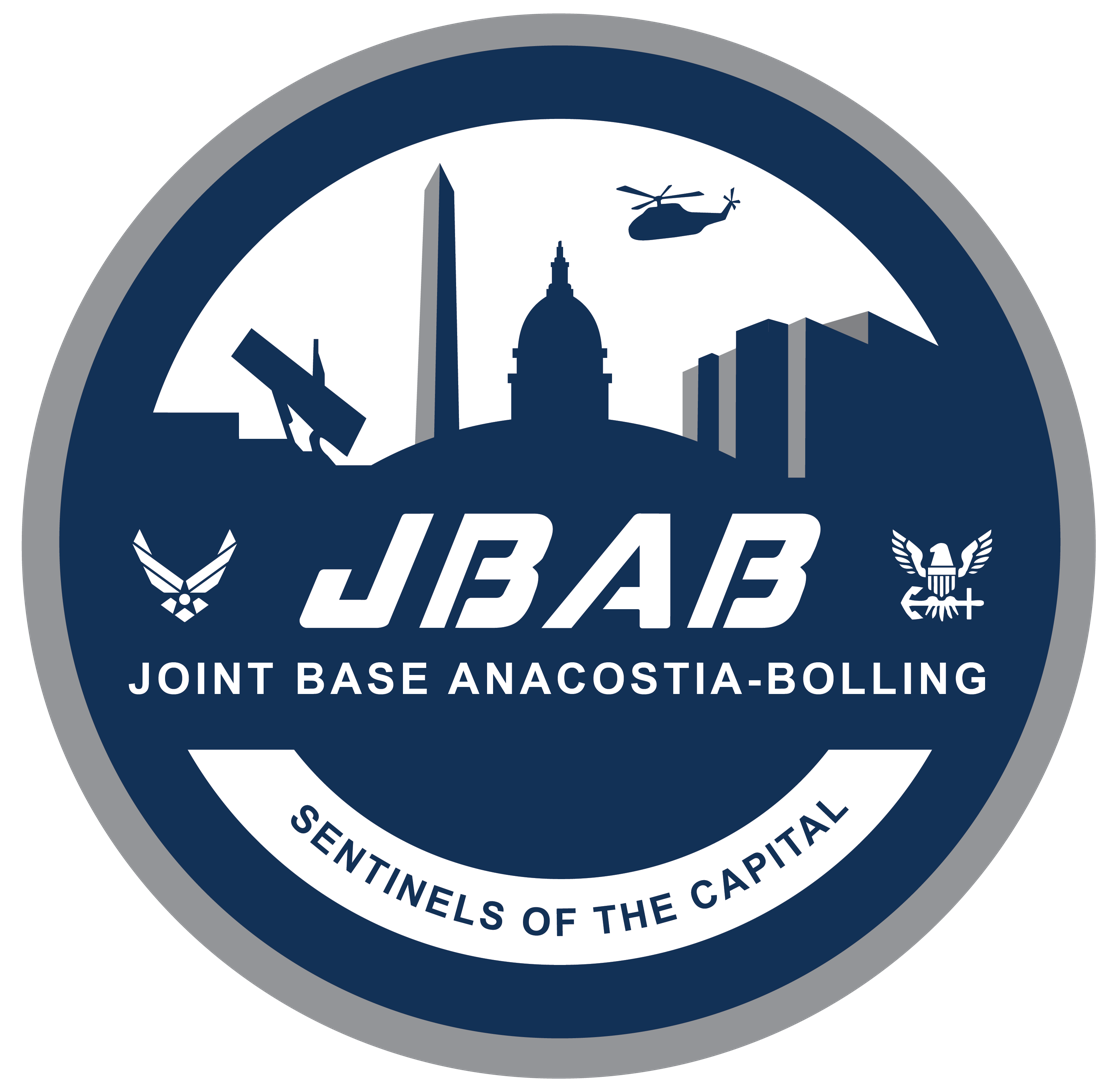

Site information
- Type: US military Joint Base
- Owner: Department of Defense
- Operator: US Air Force
- Controlled by: Air Force District of Washington
- Condition: Operational
- Website: Official website

Location
- Location in the United States
- Coordinates: 38°50′34″N 077°00′58″W

Site history
- Built: 1917–1918
- In use: 2010 – present (as Joint Base)

Garrison information
- Current commander: Colonel Ryan A.F. Crowley
- Garrison: 11th Wing (host)

Airfield information
- Identifiers: IATA: BOF, ICAO: KBOF
Helipads
Number	Length and surface
H1	30 m (100 ft)

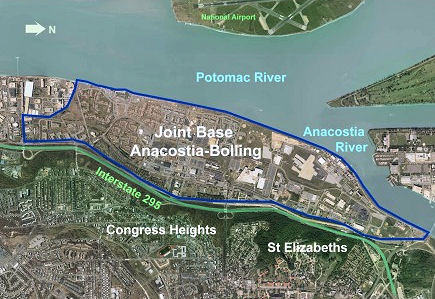
Map of Joint Base Anacostia–Bolling

Joint Base Anacostia–Bolling (JBAB) is a 905-acre (366 ha) military installation, located in Southwest Washington, D.C., established on 1 October 2010 in accordance with congressional legislation implementing the recommendations of the 2005 Base Realignment and Closure Commission. The legislation ordered the consolidation of Naval Support Facility Anacostia and Bolling Air Force Base, which were adjoining but separate military installations into a single joint base, one of twelve formed in the country as a result of the law. The base hosts the Defense Intelligence Agency Headquarters amongst its other responsibilities. The only aeronautical facility at the base is a 100-by-100-foot (30 by 30 m) helipad (ICAO: KBOF).

== Overview ==
Joint Base Anacostia–Bolling (JBAB) is responsible for providing installation support to 17,000 military, civilian employees and their families, 48 mission and tenant units, including ceremonial units (United States Air Force Honor Guard, USAF Band, USAF Chaplains, the Navy Ceremonial Guard), various Army, Marine Corps, Coast Guard, Joint Service commands and other DOD and federal agencies.

Bolling Air Force Base units also provide ceremonial support to the White House, the Chairman of the Joint Chiefs of Staff, the Secretary of the Air Force, and the Air Force Chief of Staff, mainly through 11th Wing, the United States Air Force Honor Guard and The United States Air Force Band.

NSF Anacostia falls under the command of Naval District Washington.

Additionally, the Defense Intelligence Agency Headquarters has been located at Joint Base Anacostia–Bolling since 1987, and Coast Guard Station Washington, D.C., is located on the post next to the Capitol Cove Marina. The Naval Research Laboratory is not part of the Joint Base but is located immediately adjacent to it. Department of Homeland Security Office of Inspector General is also located in the base.

The Naval Media Center was transferred to Fort Meade in 2011.

== History ==
=== Nacotchtank history ===
Prior to European colonization, the area where the Joint Base Anacostia–Bolling is located was inhabited by the Nacotchtank, an Algonquian people. The largest village of the Nacotchtank was located just north of the base, south of Anacostia Park. Two ossuaries (burial grounds) have been discovered at Bolling Air Force Base and other Nacotchtank archaeological sites have been found at Giesboro Point on the Potomac River. The two burial mounds, which included Nacotchtank bones and skulls, were discovered in 1936 by crews working at the air force base. The burial site was also likely once a Nacotchtank village.

=== Slavery ===
The Giesborough site was owned by one of the largest slave holders in the area, George Washington Young. The site was purchased in 1833 and operated as a large plantation until the start of the civil war. Large tracts of land were donated to the Union so that a cavalry post could be established.

=== Naval Support Facility Anacostia ===
The Navy began testing seaplanes at this facility in 1918, and it eventually became a naval air station supporting conventional aircraft. Located immediately north of Bolling Air Force Base, NAS Anacostia remained in service as an active naval air station until 1962, when its runways were deactivated concurrent with Bolling's due to traffic pattern issues with nearby Washington National Airport.

Redesignated as a naval support facility, NSF Anacostia serves as headquarters for Commander, Naval Installations, Navy Office of the Chief of Information, and continues to maintain a large heliport facility, primarily used by Marine Helicopter Squadron One (HMX-1) in support of "Marine One" presidential transport operations with VH-3D and VH-60N aircraft.

=== Bolling Air Force Base ===
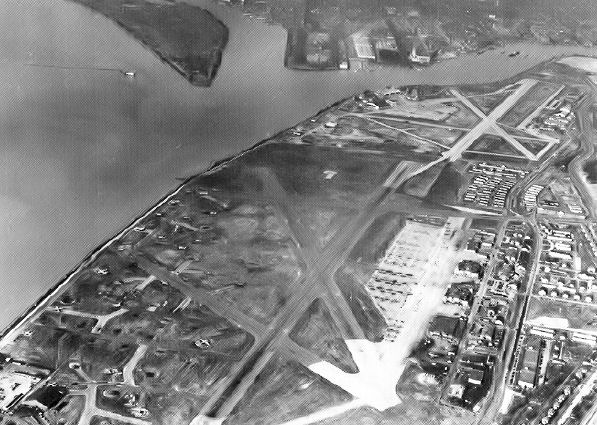
Bolling Field and Anacosta Naval Air Station, mid-1940s

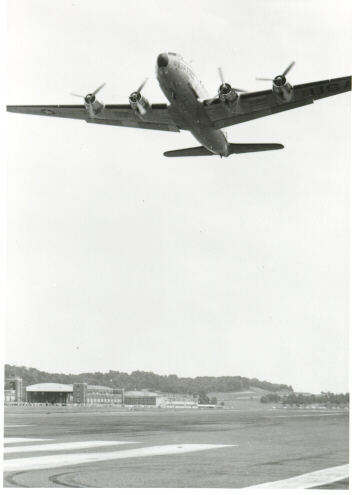
The last fixed-wing flight out of Bolling Air Force Base, 1962.

Bolling's property has been a Department of Defense (DOD) asset since 1917. From its beginning, the installation has included the Army Air Corps (predecessor to today’s Air Force) and Navy aviation and support elements. The tract of land selected for the base was scouted by William C. Ocker at the direction of General Billy Mitchell. The base began near Anacostia in 1918, as the only military airfield near the United States Capitol and was originally named The Flying Field at Anacostia on 2 October 1917. It was renamed Anacostia Experimental Flying Field in June 1918.

Not long after its acquisition by the military, the single installation evolved into two separate, adjoining bases; one Army (later Air Force) and one Navy. Bolling Field was officially opened 1 July 1918 and was named in honor of the first high-ranking air service officer killed in World War I, Colonel Raynal C. Bolling. Colonel Bolling was the Assistant Chief of the Air Service, and was killed in action near Amiens, France, on 26 March 1918 while defending himself and his driver, Private Paul L. Holder, from an attack by German soldiers.

In the late 1940s, Bolling Field’s property became Naval Air Station Anacostia and a new Air Force base, named Bolling Air Force Base, was constructed just to the south on 24 June 1948.

Bolling AFB has served as a research and testing ground for new aviation equipment and its first mission provided aerial defense of the capital. It moved to its present location, along the Potomac in the city's southwest quadrant, in the 1930s.

Over the years, Marine Corps, Coast Guard and National Guard units, as well as DOD and federal agencies also found the installation to be an ideal place from which to operate.

Throughout World War II, the installation served as a training and organizational base for personnel and units going overseas.

In 1962, fixed-wing aircraft operations at the air force and naval installations ceased, due to congested airspace around Washington National Airport on the opposite shore of the Potomac River. Although fixed-wing aircraft operations ceased, the installations continued to serve many capacities, including service with the Military Airlift Command (MAC); the headquarters for the Air Force District of Washington; the Air Force 11th Wing; Commander, Naval Installations Command, Naval Media Center (now, Defense Media Activity-Navy) and many other military commands and federal agencies

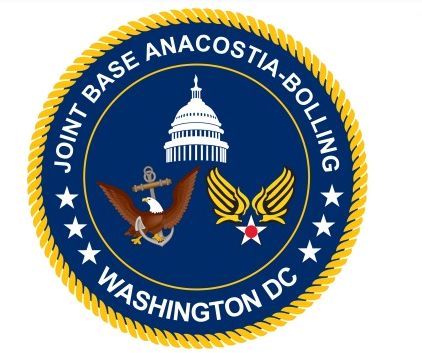
JB Anacostia-Bolling's emblem between 2010 and 2020, during which time the US Navy controlled the base.

The Air Force District of Washington (AFDW) was created and activated at Bolling on 1 October 1985 with the mission of providing administrative support to Air Force members. On 15 July 1994, AFDW was inactivated, but was reactivated 5 January 2005 to "provide a single voice for Air Force requirements in the National Capital Region" according to the base's website.

=== Joint base ===
By 2020, more than half of the activity at Anacostia–Bolling fell under the US Air Force. Consequently, it was decided that installation management and support at the base would transfer from the US Navy to the Air Force. To facilitate the change, on 11 June 2020 the 11th Wing inactivated as the host wing at Joint Base Andrews and reactivated as the 316th Wing. After fifteen years of being based at Andrews, the 11th Wing returned to Anacostia-Bolling on 12 June 2020 and activated as the host wing at the base. A memorandum of agreement was signed between the Navy and the Air Force on 24 June 2020 which formalized the transition, however the Air Force did not officially take control until 1 October 2020.

== Based units ==
Notable units based at Joint Base Anacostia–Bolling:

=== Department of Defense ===
- Office of Inspector General

=== Defense Information Systems Agency ===
- White House Communications Agency
  - Headquarters White House Communications Agency

=== Defense Intelligence Agency ===
- Defense Intelligence Agency Headquarters

=== Department of the Air Force ===
  - Office of the Secretary of the Air Force
    - Administrative Assistant to the Secretary
  - Air Force Departmental Publishing Office
    - Inspector General of the Air Force
  - Air Force District of Washington
    - 11th Wing (host wing)
      - Headquarters 11th Wing
      - 11th Comptroller Squadron
      - 11th Operations Group
        - US Air Force Band
        - US Air Force Honor Guard
        - Arlington Chaplaincy
      - 11th Medical Group
        - 11th Medical Support Squadron
        - 11th Medical Squadron
    - 11th Mission Support Group
      - 11th Civil Engineer Squadron
      - 11th Contracting Squadron
      - 11th Force Support Squadron
      - 11th Logistics Readiness Squadron
      - 11th Mission Support Group
      - 11th Security Forces Squadron
  - Air Force Historical Research Agency
    - Air Force History and Museums Program
      - Air Force Historical Support Division
  - Civil Air Patrol
    - National Capital Wing Headquarters
      - Tuskegee Composite Squadron
    - Colonel Louisa S. Morse Center for CAP History

=== Department of the Army ===
  - US Army Military District of Washington
    - Joint Air Defense Operations Center
  - District of Columbia Army National Guard

=== Department of the Navy ===
  - Office of the Secretary of the Navy
    - Naval Criminal Investigative Service (NCIS)
      - NCIS Washington Field Office
  - United States Marine Corps
    - Headquarters Marine Corps
      - Deputy Commandant for Aviation
        - Marine Helicopter Squadron 1 (HMX-1) – UH-3D Sea King, VH-3D Sea King, UH-60N Black Hawk, VH-60N White Hawk and MV-22B Osprey
    - US Marine Corps Reserve (USMCR)
    - Force Headquarters Group
      - 4th Civil Affairs Group
        - Marine Corps Advisor Company A
  - United States Navy
    - Commander, Navy Installations Command
    - Naval District Washington
      - US Navy Ceremonial Guard

=== Department of Homeland Security ===
  - United States Coast Guard
    - Atlantic Area
      - Fifth District
        - Sector Maryland-National Capital Region
          - Coast Guard Station Washington, D.C.
  - United States Secret Service

== Housing ==
Residents are zoned to District of Columbia Public Schools. Residents are zoned to Leckie Elementary School, Hart Middle School, and Ballou High School. There is a charter school on JBAB, LEARN D.C.

There was previously a proposal for an on-base school dating to the 1960s. In 2010 Leckie had about 33% of its students from military families. Leckie Elementary is near Anacostia-Bolling's south gate. Around that time Anacostia–Bolling parents have advocated establishing a charter school for secondary grades on Anacostia–Bolling so they do not have to enroll their children in faraway schools. They perceived the public secondary schools as being of low quality; around that time about 20% of the students in the local schools had adequate or higher performance in mathematics and reading.

In 2021 the LEARN Charter Schools organization signed an agreement to lease space at JBAB. It was scheduled to begin operations in Fall 2021 and is to expand to be a PreK-8 school.

== See also ==
- List of United States Air Force installations
