= William C. Ocker =

American aviation pioneer

William Charles Ocker
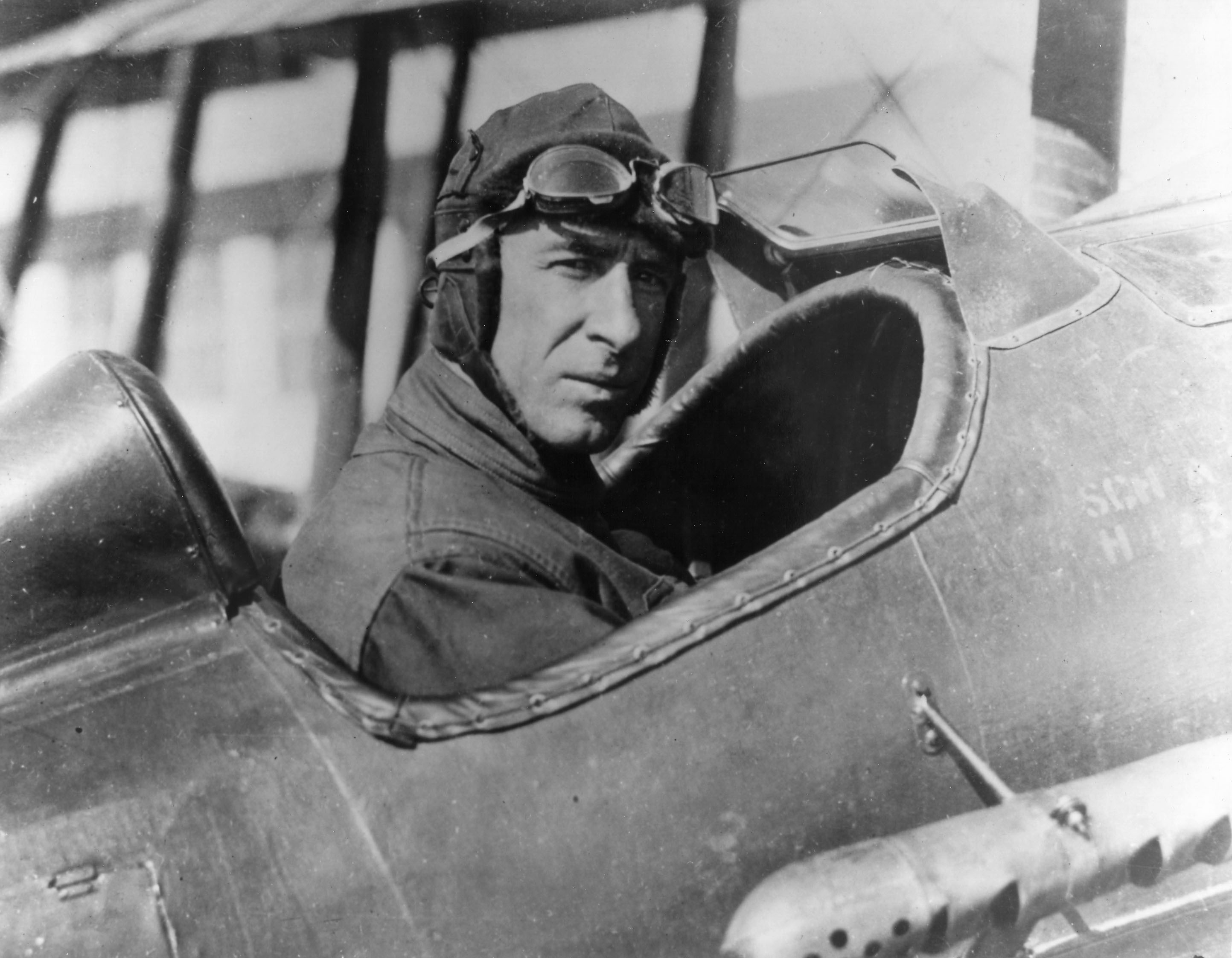
- Ocker circa 1910–1915
- Born: June 18, 1880; Philadelphia, Pennsylvania
- Died: September 15, 1942 (aged 62); Walter Reed Hospital; Washington, D.C.

Colonel William Charles Ocker (June 18, 1880 – September 15, 1942) was an American aviation pioneer. He was known as the "Father of Instrument Flying".

== Biography ==
He was born on June 18, 1880, in Philadelphia, Pennsylvania.

Ocker was one of seven children born to parents of German descent. He was educated in Philadelphia's public school system.

Ocker entered the U.S. Army on 25 June 1898, serving with the cavalry and artillery during the Spanish–American War and the Philippine–American War.

In 1909 Corporal Ocker was serving guard duty at Fort Myer when the Wright Brothers' biplane was being assembled for its first Army demonstration. He became consumed with the desire to become a pilot, but when he applied for permission to begin flight training, he was told:

Teaching enlisted men to fly runs contrary to War Department policy.

However, he was emboldened by the successful efforts of Vernon L. Burge, who was taking flying lessons from Lt. Frank P. Lahm at Fort William McKinley. Burge would become the first FAI-certified enlisted pilot, on 14 June 1912. Corporal William A. Lamkey, who entered the US Army Signal Corps on 17 May 1913, had already received pilot training from the Moisant Flying School (1912), and thereby became the second FAI-certified enlisted pilot. In 1912 Ocker (by then Sgt. Ocker) requested a transfer to Aeronautical Division. His commander, Captain Billy Mitchell, approved the transfer, remarking, "I've been thinking of transferring myself." (Mitchell later would head the Air Service American Expeditionary Force in France during World War I). Ocker made the transfer on 23 September 1912, being assigned as aeroplane mechanician at the Army Aviation School at North Island, San Diego, California.

The US Army taught Ocker to repair and maintain its 2 Curtiss biplanes, and he used this expertise to moonlight at the nearby Curtiss Flying School; instead of receiving pay for maintaining its airplanes he received flying lessons.

On 20 April 1914 Ocker received Fédération Aéronautique Internationale aviator certificate number 293, and joined Burge and Lamkey as the only three enlisted pilots in the US Army.

In 1915, Ocker (while on leave from the Army) piloted a Curtiss biplane from Pennsylvania to Washington, D.C. carrying newly elected Representative Orrin Dubbs Bleakley. Bleakley was recognized as the first elected person to fly from his home state to the nation's capital for duty.

In 1938 Ocker and Lt. George R. Smith patented a radical new type of airplane propeller that produced less noise and vibration than previous versions. In 1941 Ocker and Major Carl J. Crane invented the "Pre-Flight Reflex Trainer", used to familiarize student pilots with an airplane's motions prior to actual flight training.

He died at Walter Reed Hospital in Washington, D.C. on September 15, 1942, at age 62.

== Involvement with aircraft equipment development ==
Ocker was involved in testing and maintaining some early experiments in aircraft stability and guidance, conducted on the Curtiss flying boat maintained by Ocker. Elmer A. Sperry, who was developing the equipment, often supervised Ocker in these efforts.

Flying time was difficult to come by in the 1910s due to the limited aircraft in the Army inventory. Ocker volunteered for any possible testing, and thus amassed flying hours more rapidly than most pilots of the era. In 1916 he worked to test and develop airborne radio equipment

Ocker also made newspaper headlines in 1916 when he flew a scouting aircraft to 10,000 altitude over San Diego, California and circled the area for an hour: "Aviator ascends 10,000 feet, circles over harbor for hour; spectators thrilled by sight." Later that year he again made headlines when he performed 15 consecutive loops over the city.

Ocker was commissioned as a captain in the US Army Reserve on January 11, 1917. As the US entered World War I Ocker was called to teach flying to others, first in the Aviation Section, and then as an active-duty officer, commanding Chandler Field in Essington, Pennsylvania. (15 March to 13 April 1917).

== Development of blind-flight instruments ==
Ocker and Major David Meyers dealt with disorientation associated with blind flying. Using a Bárány_chair, they demonstrated this disorientation was associated with the affect of accelerations on the vestibular system. Their method of blind flying incorporated reliance on the turn and bank indicator. Thus, rather than rely solely on their senses, a mental picture of the horizon was constructed based on their instruments, in the days before the artificial horizon.

In 1930 the Army assigned Ocker to Kelly Field with the rank of Major. He had received a patent on the use of the turn-and-bank in aircraft flight, but assigned the patent rights to the government.

In 1930 he again made newspaper headlines (in Tucson, Arizona), for his cross-country flights (involving landings at the Tucson Airport) while developing blind-flying instruments.

== Other achievements ==
In 1921 Ocker was named to a Board of Inquiry investigating the much-publicized crash of an Army aircraft on 28 May 1921, with 7 fatalities, following a review of the air brigade at Langley Field. The airplane was returning to Bolling Field in the DC area when it was caught in an intense storm. Ocker was also flying home from the same function and had also encountered the storm; this involvement was publicly noted by the Army when it made the press announcement naming Ocker and the other board members.

Ocker was hand-picked by General Billy Mitchell to scout various parcels of future airfields near the Potomac River. One of the tracts he selected became Bolling Field, Washington, D.C.

On 24 June 1930 Ocker flew 900 miles (San Antonio, Texas to Scotts Field, Illinois) while in an enclosed cockpit, without reference to outside visual cues. He called the flight "an unofficial test".

He developed a "flight integrator", essentially an electrically driven gyroscope with a moving background scroll that depicted a sky with clouds, and a miniature airplane silhouette which remained correctly oriented relative to the horizon thus depicted.

== Legacy ==
In January 1955, the US Air Force posthumously awarded the Legion of Merit to Ocker in recognition of the many lives saved during World War II as a result of the training devices he had pioneered and developed. It was received by Doris Ocker, his widow, at a ceremony on Davis-Monthan Air Force Base.

In 1934, Orville Wright wrote, "Except for Maj. Ocker's great zeal as a missionary, I doubt whether the course in blind flying would be a requirement in the Army today. I believe that his campaign of education has had more influence in bringing about the use of instruments than that of any other person."

== Published works ==
- Antebellum Fledglings, the Sportsman Pilot, August 1931
- Blind Flight in Theory and Practice, (co-author with Lt. Carl J. Crane), Naylor Printing Co. San Antonio TX (1932)
