= Bolling Air Force Base =

Air Force base in Washington, D.C., United States

- Southeast, Washington, D.C. in the United States
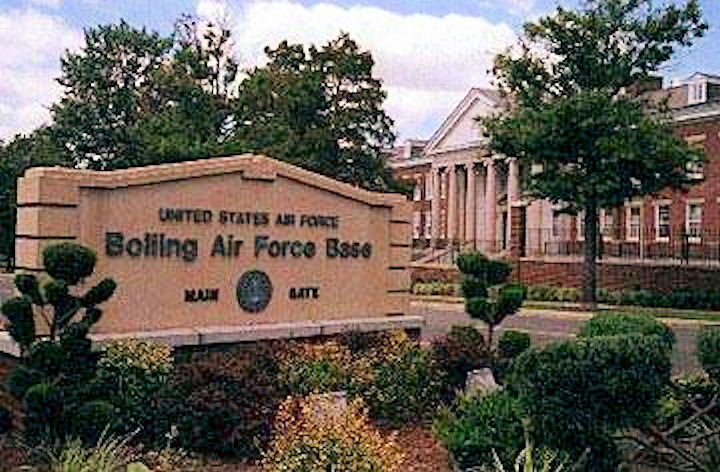
- Bolling AFB main gate during 2008

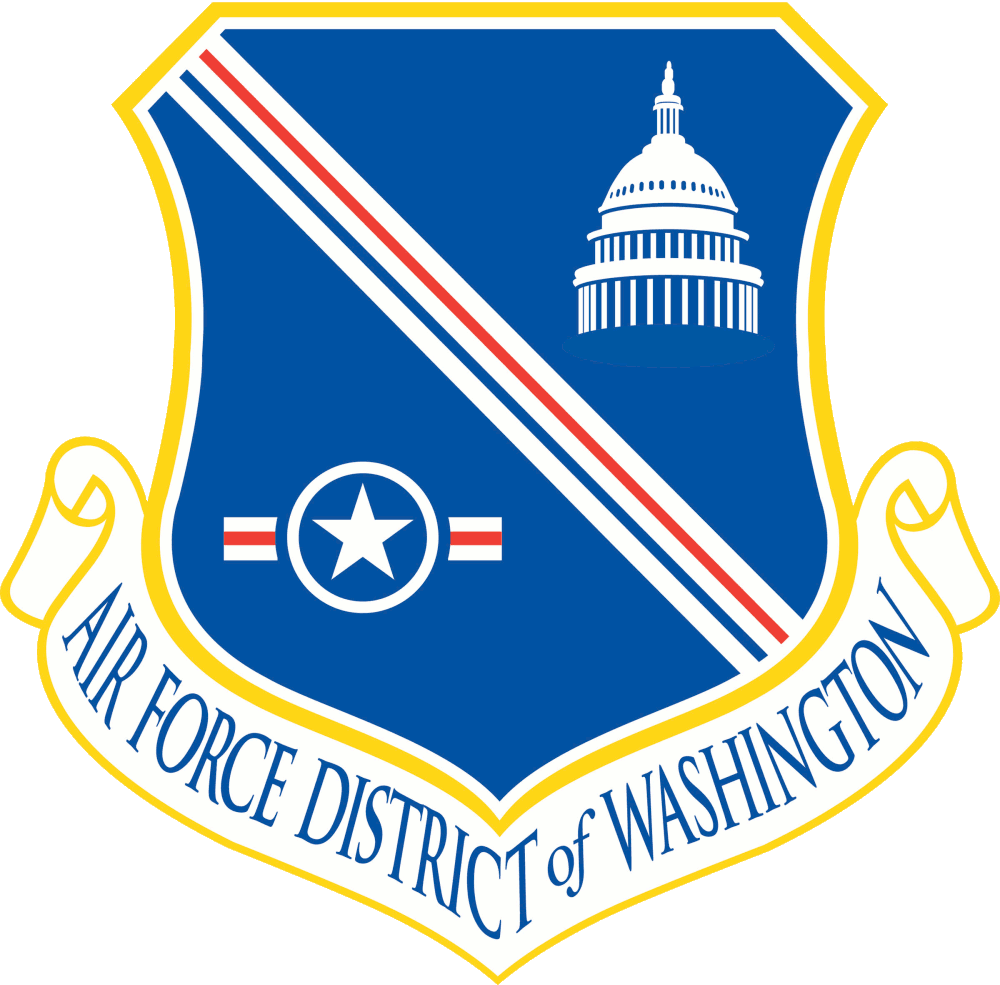

Site information
- Type: US Air Force Base
- Owner: Department of Defense
- Operator: US Air Force
- Controlled by: Air Force District of Washington
- Website: Official website (archived)

Location
- Location within the United States Location within the District of Columbia
- Coordinates: 38°50′34″N 077°00′58″W

Site history
- Built: 1917 (as The Flying Field at Anacostia)
- In use: 1917 – 1 October 2010
- Fate: Realigned to form part of Joint Base Anacostia–Bolling

Bolling Air Force Base or Bolling AFB is a United States Air Force installation located in Washington, D.C. In 2010, it merged with Naval Support Facility Anacostia to form Joint Base Anacostia–Bolling. From its establishment, the base has served as a joint site for both the Army Air Corps (predecessor to today's Air Force) and Navy aviation and support elements.

== History ==
The Department of Defense (DOD) has owned the Bolling grounds since 1917, when the tract of land was scouted by William C. Ocker at the direction of General Billy Mitchell. Founded on 2 October 1917 as The Flying Field at Anacostia, it was the first military airfield near the United States Capitol. It was renamed Anacostia Experimental Flying Field in June 1918.

Soon, the single installation evolved into two separate, adjoining bases; one Army (later Air Force) and one Navy. Bolling Field was opened 1 July 1918 and was named for Colonel Raynal C. Bolling, the first high-ranking air service officer killed in World War I. Colonel Bolling was the Assistant Chief of the Air Service, and was killed in action near Amiens, France, on 26 March 1918 while defending himself and his driver, Private Paul L. Holder, from German soldiers. Flying activities began on 4 July 1918 with mailplanes landing there, with all equipment removed from the former location at the Polo Grounds, Washington, D.C.

In the late 1940s, Bolling Field's property became Naval Air Station Anacostia and a new Air Force base, named Bolling Air Force Base, was constructed just to the south on 24 June 1948.

Bolling AFB has served as a research and testing ground for new aviation equipment and its first mission provided aerial defense of the capital. It moved to its present location, along the Potomac in the city's southwest quadrant, in the 1930s.

Over the years, Marine Corps, Coast Guard and National Guard units, as well as DOD and federal agencies also found the installation to be an ideal place from which to operate.

- In 1918, pilots from the installation were dispatched by President Woodrow Wilson to create the first permanent airmail route from Washington, D.C. to New York City.
- Navy seaplanes were first tested and Air Force aerial refueling techniques were developed by installation-based personnel and military commands.
- Following its successful transatlantic flight in 1927, Charles Lindbergh's Spirit of St. Louis returned to the installation. Soon after, the aircraft was used for Lindbergh's goodwill flight to Mexico and South America.
- Air Force Lt. Col. Henry "Hap" Arnold led a bomber flight from Bolling Field on a 4,000-mile journey to Alaska in 1934, to demonstrate the capabilities of long-range strategic bombing missions.
- Throughout World War II, the installation served as a training and organizational base for personnel and units going overseas. It also served as the aerial gateway to the nation's capital.
- The Air Force's first headquarters was established at the installation, as Army Air Forces Headquarters in 1941 and, with the creation of the United States Air Force, Air Force Headquarters in 1947.
- The Sacred Cow, President Harry Truman's initial official aircraft and Franklin Roosevelt's only official aircraft, retired from service on the installation in 1961. This aircraft was the predecessor to Air Force One and was used for both presidential and VIP support missions. President Truman signed the National Security Act of 1947, which created the United States Air Force, at the desk on board this aircraft.
- In 1962, fixed-wing aircraft operations at the air force and naval installations ceased, due to congested airspace around Washington National Airport on the opposite shore of the Potomac River.

Although fixed-wing aircraft operations ceased, the installations continued to serve the Military Airlift Command (MAC); the headquarters for the Air Force District of Washington; the Air Force 11th Wing; Commander, Naval Installations Command, Naval Media Center (now, Defense Media Activity-Navy) and many other military commands and federal agencies.

The Air Force District of Washington (AFDW) was created and activated at Bolling on 1 October 1985 with the mission of providing administrative support to Air Force members. On 15 July 1994, AFDW was inactivated, but was reactivated 5 January 2005 to "provide a single voice for Air Force requirements in the National Capital Region" according to the base's website.

Between 19 and 23 December 2000, representatives from the Israeli government and Palestinian Authority convened at Bolling to negotiate a final-status agreement to end the Israeli–Palestinian conflict. The failure of these negotiations led to the unveiling on 23 December of the Clinton Parameters.

== Major commands assigned ==
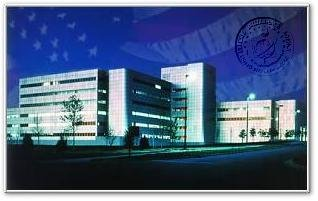
Defense Intelligence Agency Headquarters

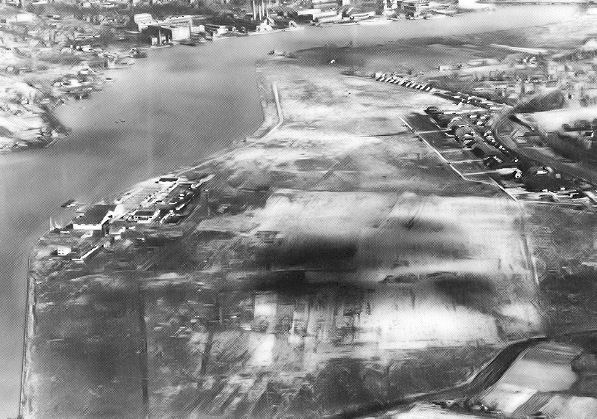
Bolling Field, mid-1920s

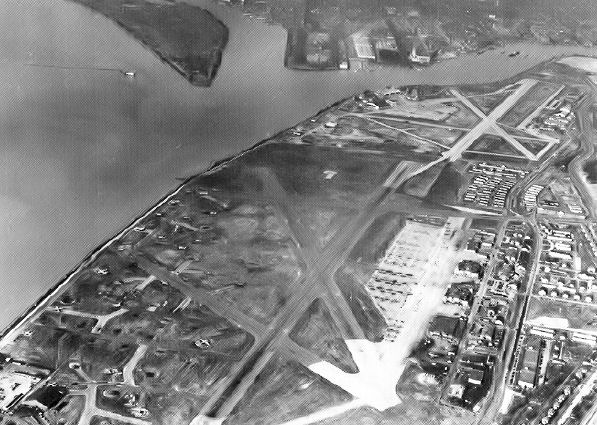
Bolling Field and Anacosta Naval Air Station, mid-1940s

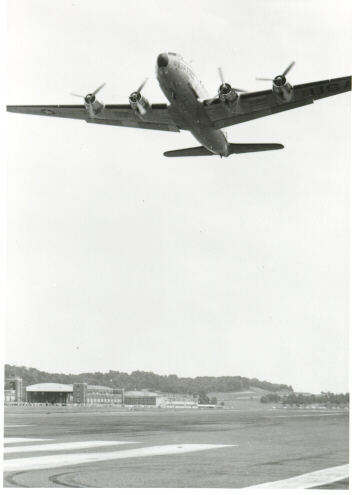
The last fixed-wing flight out of Bolling Air Force Base, 1 July 1962.

- Director of Military Aeronautics, 28 June 1918
- 3d Service Command, 6 March 1928
- Chief of Air Corps (Exempted Station), 1 July 1936
- General Headquarters Air Force, 15 March 1941

Redesignated Air Force Combat Command, 20 June 1941

- Second Air Force, 13 October 1942
- Headquarters, United States Army Air Forces, 7 July 1943
- Continental Air Forces, 17 July 1945

Redesignated: Strategic Air Command, 21 March 1946

- Bolling Field Command, 16 December 1946
- Military Air Transport Service, 1 August 1952
- Bolling Field Command, 1 October 1957

Redesignated Headquarters Command, United States Air Force, 17 March 1958

- Military Airlift Command, 1 July 1976
- Air Force District of Washington, 1 October 1985 – 5 July 1994; 7 July 2005 – present
- Headquarters, United States Air Force, 5 July 1994 – 7 July 2005

== Major units assigned ==
- 312th Aero Sq (Service), July 1918 – 17 August 1919
- 99th Observation Sq, 18 August 1919 – 21 March 1921
- HQ Detachment, Bolling Field, 11 July 1922 – 31 March 1928
- General Headquarters, Air Force, 1 October 1933 – 28 February 1935
- 14th Air Base Group, 1 March 1935 – 31 March 1944
- 1st Staff Squadron, 1 September 1936 – 31 March 1944
- 2d Staff Squadron, 1 September 1936 – 31 March 1944
- 4th Staff Squadron, 17 May 1941 – 31 March 1944
- Air Force Combat Command, 28 March 1941 – 12 March 1942
- V Air Support Command (redesignated: Ninth Air Force), 23 July – 28 October 1942
- 5th Bombardment Wing, 10–31 July 1942
- VIII Ground Air Support Command, 28 April – 29 May 1942
- 10th Ferrying Squadron, 10 April 1942 – 1 March 1943
- Transatlantic Sector, AAF Ferrying Command

Redesignated, Transatlantic Sector, Air Transport Command, 21 February 1942 – 15 April 1943

- XII Air Support Command, 25 September – 19 October 1942
- Twelfth Air Force, 20–28 August 1942
- 26th Transport Group, 1 March 1943 – 21 February 1944
- Army Air Force Base Unit 1

Redesignated Air Force Base Unit 1, 1 April 1944 – 1 April 1948

- 503d Army Air Force Base Unit, 21 February 1944

Redesignated: 503d Air Force Base Unit, 27 September 1947 – 1 April 1948

- Continental Air Forces, 15 December 1944 – 20 October 1946
- Strategic Air Command, 21 March 1946 – 20 October 1946
- Bolling Field Command. 15 December 1946

Redesignated: Headquarters Command, USAF, 17 March 1958 – 1 July 1976

- 1st Special Air Missions Squadron

Redesignated: 1111th Special Air Mission Squadron
Redesignated: 1299th Air Transport Squadron, 10 March 1948 – 10 July 1961

- 16th Special Air Missions Group

Redesignated: 1100th Special Air Missions Group
Redesignated: 2310th Air Transport Group, 10 March 1948 – 29 November 1952

- 1100th Air Base Wing, 16 March 1949 – 30 September 1977

Redesignated: 1100th Air Base Group, 30 September 1977 – 15 December 1980
Redesignated: 1100th Air Base Wing, 15 December 1980 – 15 July 1994

- Air Force District of Washington, 1 October 1985 – 5 July 1994; 7 July 2005–present
- 11th Wing, 15 July 1994 – present

== See also ==
- List of former United States Air Force installations
