= Naval Support Facility Anacostia =

United States Navy base in Washington, DC, United States

- Part of Naval Support Activity Washington
- Anacostia, Washington, D.C.
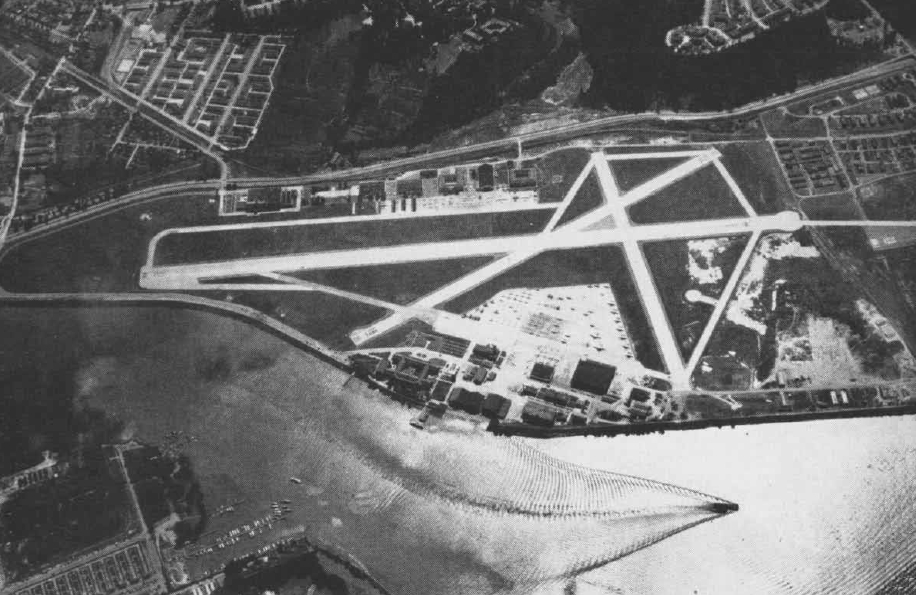
- Aerial view of NAS Anacostia in the mid-1940s

Site information
- Type: Multi-use

Location
- Coordinates: 38°51′3.6″N 77°0′48.6″W

Site history
- Built: Established 1918
- In use: 1918 - 2010

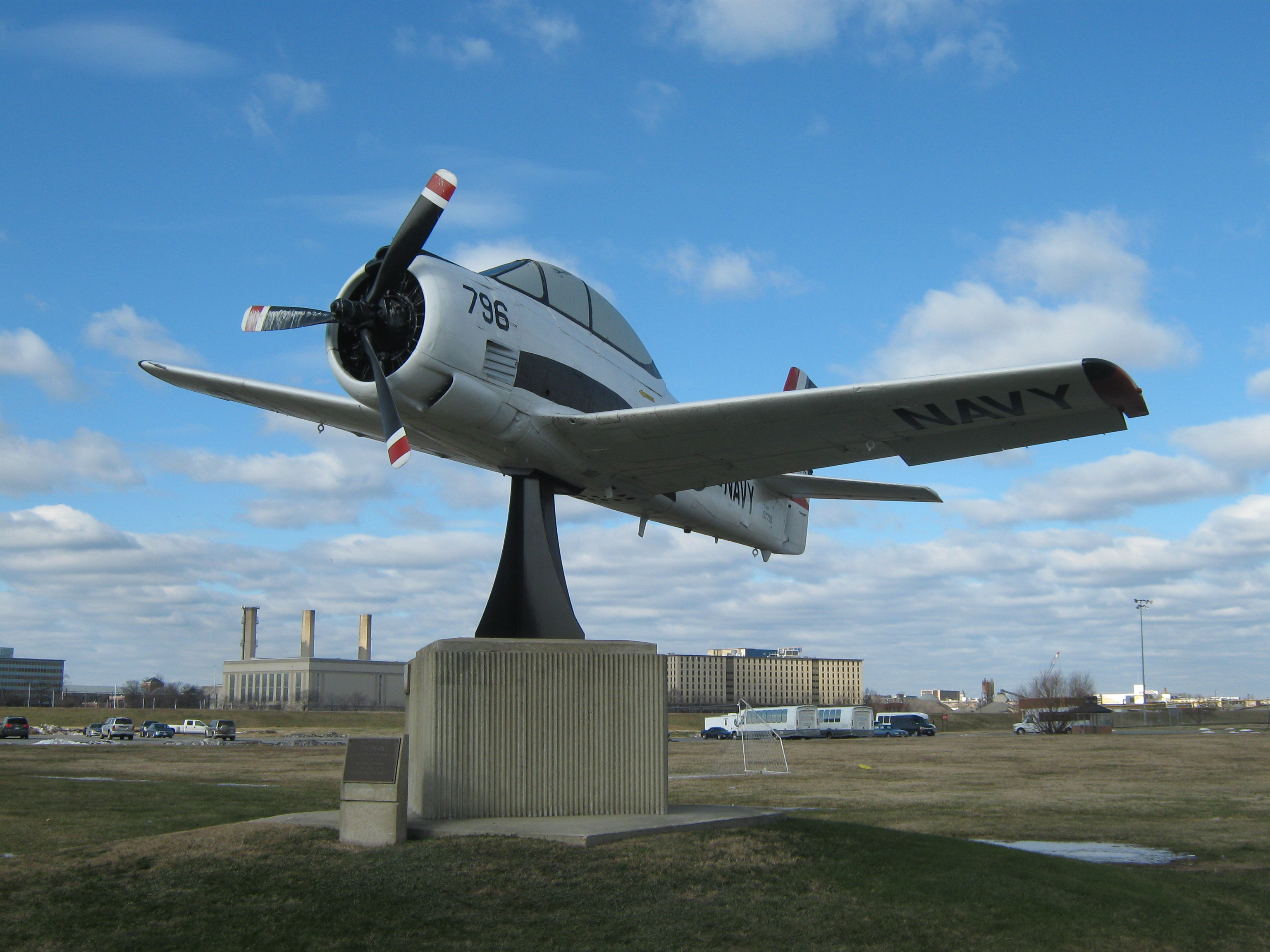
T-28 Trojan, BuNo 137796, memorial near the main gate, the last T-28 in the Training Command, retired March 1984.

Naval Support Facility (NSF) Anacostia is a United States Naval Base in Washington, D.C., close to where the Anacostia River joins the Potomac River. On 1 October 2010 the base was conjoined with the adjacent Bolling Air Force Base to form the Joint Base Anacostia–Bolling in accordance with congressional legislation implementing the recommendations of the 2005 Base Realignment and Closure Commission. NSF Anacostia fell under the command of Naval Support Activity Washington.

== History ==
Prior to European colonization, the area where the Naval Support Facility Anacostia was located was inhabited by the Nacotchtank, an Algonquian people. The largest village of the Nacotchtank was located just north of Bolling Air Force Base, south of Anacostia Park. Two ossuaries (burial grounds) have been discovered at Bolling Air Force Base. Other Nacotchtank archaeological sites have been found at Giesboro Point on the Potomac River, close to where the Naval Support Facility was once located. The two burial mounds, which included Nacotchtank bones and skulls, were discovered in 1936 by crews working at Bolling Air Force Base. The burial site was also likely once a Nacotchtank village.

The Navy began testing seaplanes at this facility in 1918, and eventually it became a naval air station, supporting conventional aircraft. Located immediately north of Bolling Air Force Base, NAS Anacostia remained in service as an active naval air station until 1962, when its runways were deactivated along with Bolling's due to traffic pattern conflicts with the nearby Washington National Airport.

Redesignated as a naval support facility, NSF Anacostia served as the headquarters for Commander, Naval Installations, Navy Office of the Chief of Information and continued to maintain a large heliport facility, primarily used by Marine Helicopter Squadron One (HMX-1) in support of "Marine One" presidential transport operations with VH-3D and VH-60N aircraft. These activities remained when the base was incorporated into the larger Joint Base Anacostia–Bolling.

=== Tenant commands ===
- United States Navy Ceremonial Guard
- District of Columbia Army National Guard
- Department of Defense Inspector General
- Marine Helicopter Squadron (HMX-1)
- Marine Forces Reserve Center
- White House Communications Agency
