= 76th =

76th is the ordinal form of the number 76. 76th or Seventy-sixth may also refer to:

- A fraction, 1/76, equal to one of 76 equal parts

== Geography ==
- 76th meridian east, a line of longitude
- 76th meridian west, a line of longitude
- 76th parallel north, a circle of latitude
- 76th parallel south, a circle of latitude
- 76th Street (IRT Third Avenue Line), a local station on the demolished IRT Third Avenue Line in New York City

== Government ==
- California's 76th State Assembly district, one of 80 districts in the California State Assembly
- 76th Delaware General Assembly, a meeting of the legislative branch of the state government
- 76th Oregon Legislative Assembly, convened beginning on January 11, 2011, for its regular session
- 76th United States Congress, a meeting of the legislative branch of the United States federal government

== Military ==
- 76th Air Army, an air army of the Soviet Air Forces from 1949 to 1980 and from 1988 to 1998
- 76th Air Division (76th AD) is an inactive United States Air Force organization
- 76th Air Refueling Squadron (76 ARS) is part of the 514th Air Mobility Wing at McGuire Air Force Base, New Jersey
- 76th Airlift Division, a division of the United States Air Force, activated on 1 March 1976
- 76th Airlift Squadron (76 AS), part of the 86th Airlift Wing at Ramstein Air Base, Germany
- 76th Army Band (United States), a direct support band based in Mannheim, Germany
- 76th Division (People's Republic of China), a military formation of the People's Volunteer Army during the Korean War
- 76th Division (United States), a unit of the United States Army in World War I and World War II
- 76th Field Artillery Regiment, a Field Artillery regiment of the United States Army
- 76th Fighter Squadron (76 FS), a United States Air Force Reserve unit
- 76th Guards Air Assault Division, a division of the Russian Airborne Troops based in Pskov
- 76th Illinois Volunteer Infantry Regiment, an infantry regiment that served in the Union Army during the American Civil War
- 76th Infantry Brigade Combat Team (United States) ("Night Hawks") is a modular infantry brigade of the United States Army National Guard of Indiana
- 76th Infantry Division (Germany), created on 26 August 1939 together with the 23rd Infantry Division in Potsdam
- 76th Infantry Division (United Kingdom), a Second World War British Army unit created for service during that war
- 76th Maintenance Wing (76 MXW), a wing of the United States Air Force based out of Tinker Air Force Base, Oklahoma City Oklahoma
- 76th Ohio Infantry, an infantry regiment of the Union Army during the American Civil War
- 76th Punjabis, an infantry regiment of the British Indian Army
- 76th Reconnaissance Group, a World War II United States Army Air Forces organization
- 76th Regiment of Foot
- 76th Reserve Division (German Empire), a unit of the Imperial German Army in World War I
- 76th Rifle Division (Soviet Union), a Soviet infantry fighting unit of the Red Army that fought on the Eastern Front during the Second World War
- 76th Space Control Squadron (76 SPCS), an offensive counter space unit located at Peterson AFB, Colorado
- 76th Army (disambiguation)
- 76th Brigade (disambiguation)
- 76th Division (disambiguation)
- 76th Squadron (disambiguation)

== Other ==
- 76th century
- 76th century BC
- 76th Academy Awards ceremony honored films of 2003

== See also ==
- 76 (disambiguation)
- 76th Grey Cup, the 1988 Canadian Football League championship game played at Lansdowne Park in Ottawa
- CMLL 76th Anniversary Show, a professional wrestling major show event in 2009 in Arena Mexico, Mexico City, Mexico
- AD 76, the year 76 (LXXVI) of the Julian calendar
