= LXXVI Corps =

LXXVI Corps or 76th Corps may refer to:

- LXXVI Panzer Corps, Wehrmacht, Germany
- 76th (Port Dundas) Lanarkshire Rifle Volunteer Corps, United Kingdom
- 76th (Farnworth) Lancashire Rifle Volunteer Corps, United Kingdom

== See also ==
- List of military corps by number
- 76th Brigade (disambiguation)
- 76th Division (disambiguation)
- 76th Regiment (disambiguation)
- 76th (disambiguation)
