= 76th Army =

76th Army can refer to:

- 76th Group Army, People's Republic of China
- 76th Air Army, Soviet Union

== See also ==
- List of armies by number
- 76th Division (disambiguation)
- 76th Brigade (disambiguation)
- 76th Regiment (disambiguation)
- 76th Squadron (disambiguation)
- 76th (disambiguation)
