= United States Air Force Band =

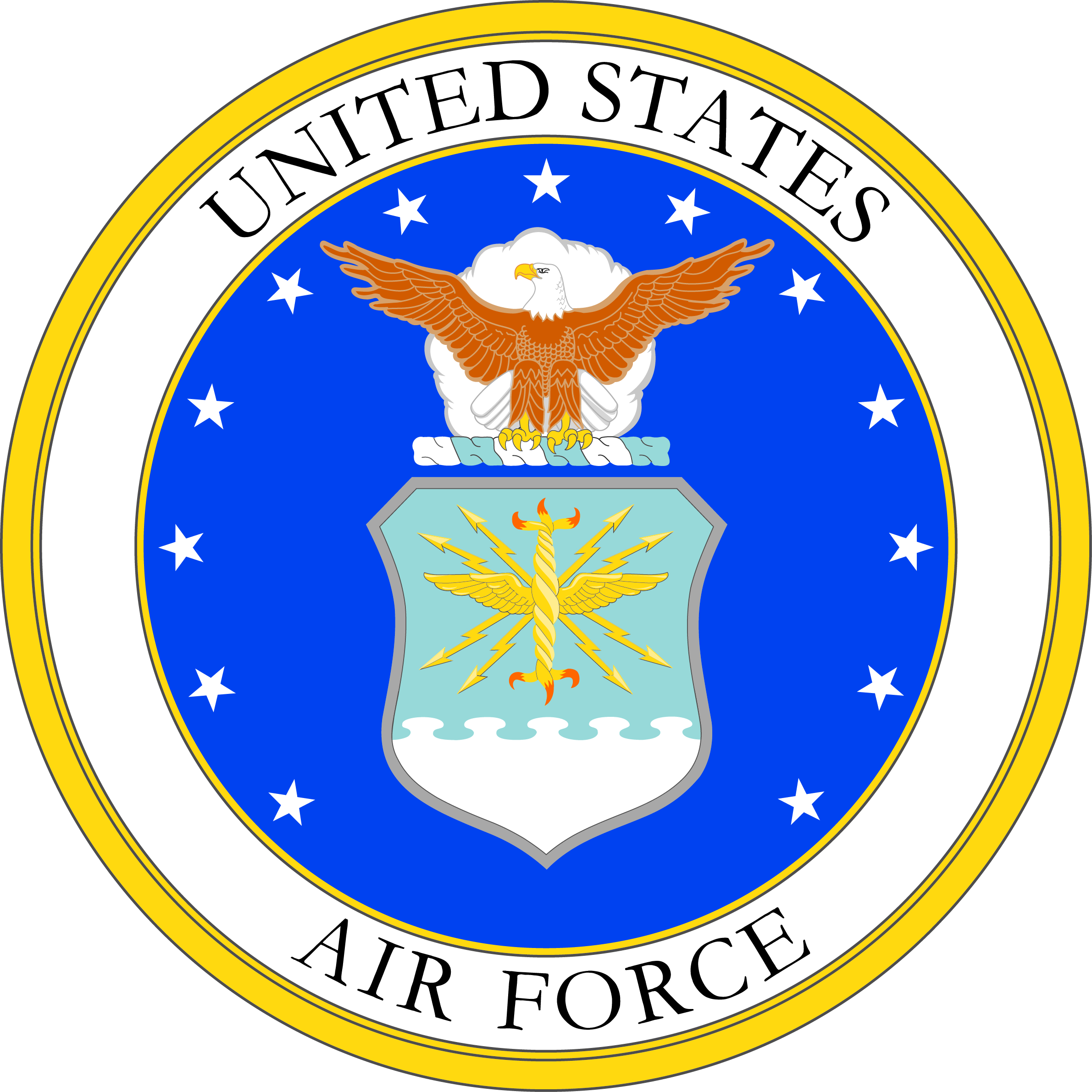
The United States Air Force Band

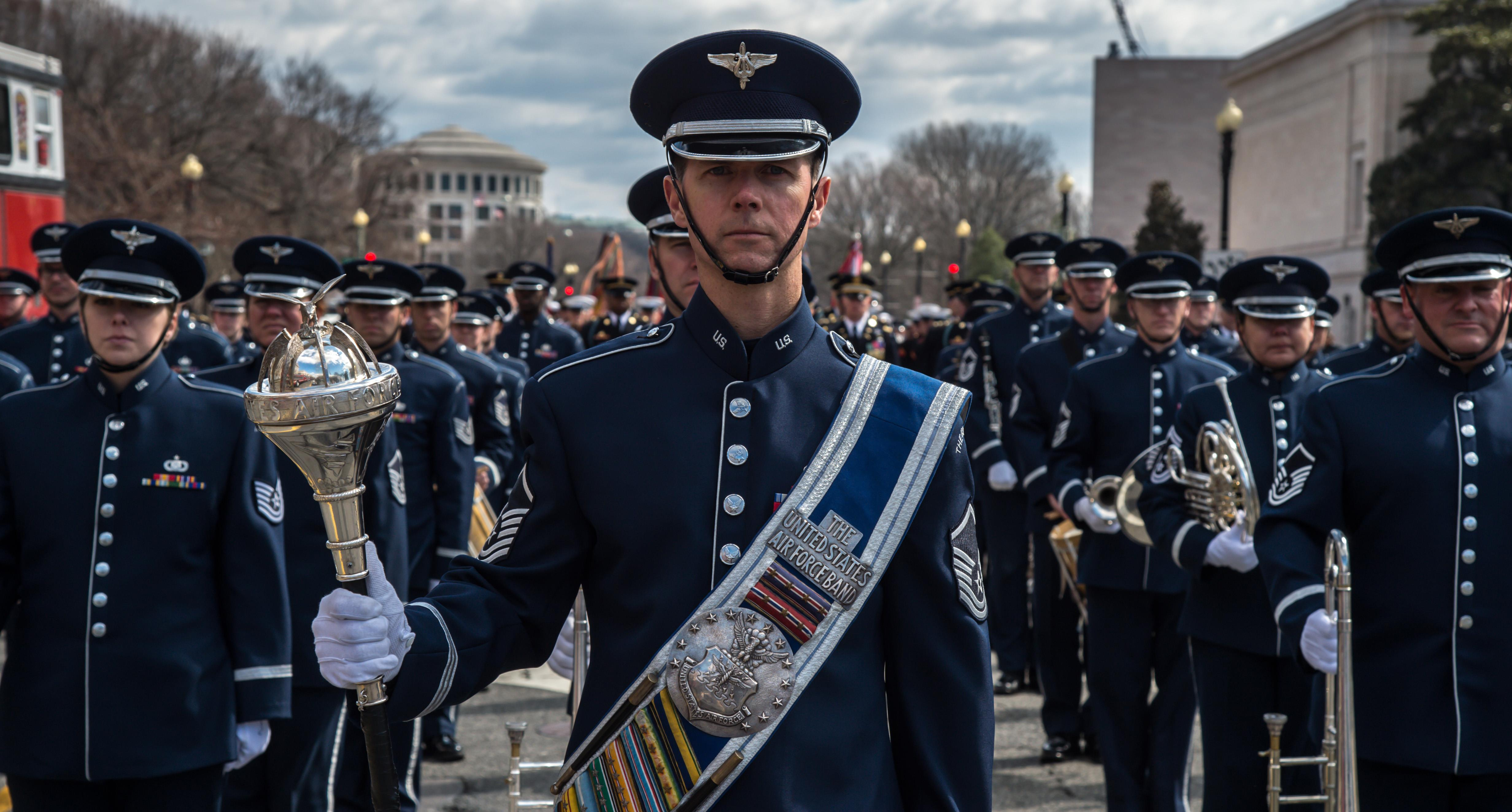
- The U.S. Air Force Band in a 2015 parade in Washington, D.C.
- Active: 1941–1948; 1948–1949; 1949–present
- Country: United States
- Branch: United States Air Force
- Type: Military band
- Role: Public duties
- Garrison/HQ: Joint Base Anacostia-Bolling
- Website: www.usafband.af.mil

Commanders
- Commander/Conductor: Colonel Don Schofield
- Director of Operations: Lieutenant Colonel Michael D. Hoerber
- Senior Enlisted Leader: CMSgt Karl P. Sweedy

Insignia
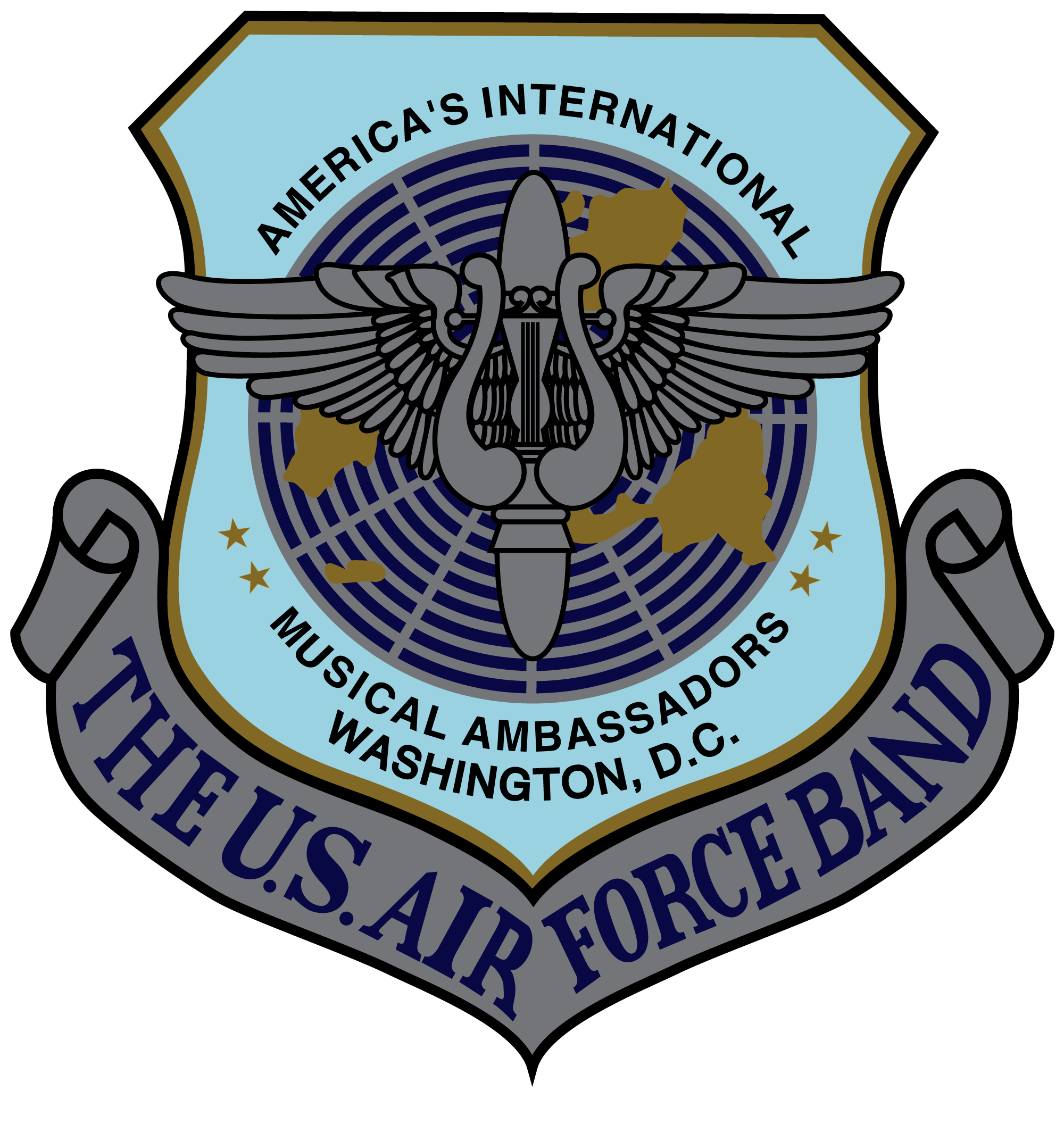
- The United States Air Force Band emblem

The United States Air Force Band is a U.S. military band consisting of 184 active-duty members of the United States Air Force.

It is the Air Force's premier musical organization and is based at Joint Base Anacostia–Bolling in Washington, D.C. Within the band there are six performing ensembles:

1. The Concert Band
2. Singing Sergeants
3. The Airmen of Note
4. Air Force Strings
5. Ceremonial Brass
6. Max Impact

Collectively, these musical groups perform a wide spectrum of styles, including classical, jazz, popular, patriotic, and ceremonial music.

The mission of the band is to deliver musical products that inspire emotions, create positive impressions and communicate information according to Air Force objectives for the defense of the United States.

== Formation and early history ==
The United States Air Force Band is the youngest of the military bands based in Washington, D.C. Its military life began on 24 September 1941, with the formation of the Bolling Army Air Forces Band under the sponsorship of Lieutenant L.P. Holcomb, commanding officer of the Air Base Group at Bolling Field.

Alf Heiberg served as the Band's first commander and led the group from 1941 to 1944. The first ensemble consisted only of four players, but by the end of 1942 expanded to a total of 100 musicians. The group began to travel throughout the United States, performing at fairs and athletic events.

To identify band members in uniform, Heiberg designed a cap emblem using the pilots' wings with a superimposed musical lyre. This symbol has remained the emblem of The United States Air Force Band throughout its history.

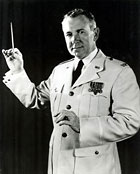
Colonel George S. Howard, USAF Chief of Bands and Music

In 1944, George S. Howard was named Commander and Conductor, a position he held for 20 years. Late in 1944, he took the Band on its first international tour; the group performed in England and France while the Royal Air Force Band toured the United States. This was the first tour for The Army Air Forces Band that included sites outside continental North America.

Following World War II, all but five of the band members left for civilian life. However, because of the program's success during the war, Howard was asked to remain in command of the Band and was charged with reorganizing it to serve in peacetime functions. He immediately embarked on a recruiting program to return the group to its original size, and the total manpower strength was increased to 115.

The Symphony Orchestra was instituted during this reorganization and was the first group of its kind in any military band organization. The Symphony Orchestra ultimately supplied players not only for the Strolling Strings (now known as The Air Force Strings) but for the Concert Band, which, under Howard's direction, included cellists.

The Band truly became The United States Air Force Band in 1947 when the Army Air Forces were officially designated as the United States Air Force. All units of the organization assumed the official "Air Force" title.

=== WAF Band ===
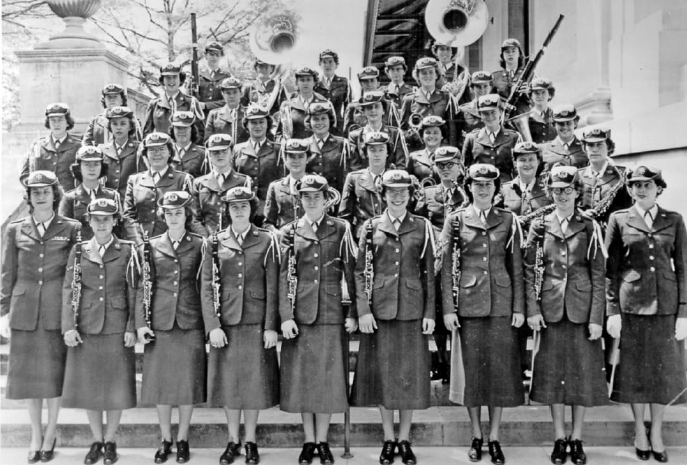
The WAF Band poses at USAF Band School at Bolling Air Force Base in Washington, D.C.

In January 1951, Howard organized the 543rd Air Force Band made up of 19 female airmen from the Women's Air Force (WAF) program. He expanded this group to some 50 members and in June 1955, in Air Force Regulation 190-21, they were officially designated "United States WAF Band", acknowledging their de facto status as USAF representatives rather than their original status as a simple base band. Their official mission became to "assist, within their capabilities, in promoting Air Force objectives and enhancing the prestige of the Air Force and the United States." This meant there were now two bands serving as ambassadors of the USAF: the all-male Air Force Band and the all-female WAF Band. The WAF Band was dissolved in 1961 following its commander's contravention of a directive from Howard restricting performances at civilian schools and county fairs.

== Performances ==
The United States Air Force Band has performed live for over 100 million people and has been broadcast via television and radio to audiences around the globe. It has embarked on 25 international concert tours, with performances in more than 50 countries and 42 world capitals.

The United States Air Force Band performance schedule is coordinated by the 11th Operations Group on Joint Base Anacostia-Bolling, which works with the Commander of the Air Force Band and the Air Force Band Operations Office to schedule performances and ceremonies by the Band's performing ensembles.

Members of the Air Force Band's support staff, including the Library, Production, Technical Support, as well as the Administration, Marketing and Outreach, and Supply offices, also work to coordinate, promote, and facilitate performances throughout the year.

The United States Air Force Band took part in both the 2012 and 2017 Macy's Thanksgiving Day Parades, each parade appearance honoring a major anniversary since the foundation of the Air Force.

Performances by The United States Air Force Band include:

- Public concerts in the Washington, D.C., area and across the nation during their annual Fall and Spring Concert Tours
- Washington, D.C., area military and patriotic ceremonies
- Full and Standard Honors Funerals at Arlington National Cemetery
- Summer concerts at the Air Force Memorial
- Airmen of Note Jazz Heritage Series concerts in the Fall
- Annual Holiday concert and Guest Artist Series concerts at D.A.R. Constitution Hall in Washington, D.C., and at the Rachel M. Schlesinger Concert Hall and Arts Center in Alexandria, Va.

A schedule of concerts is available on the Air Force Band website.

== Ensembles ==
=== The United States Air Force Concert Band ===
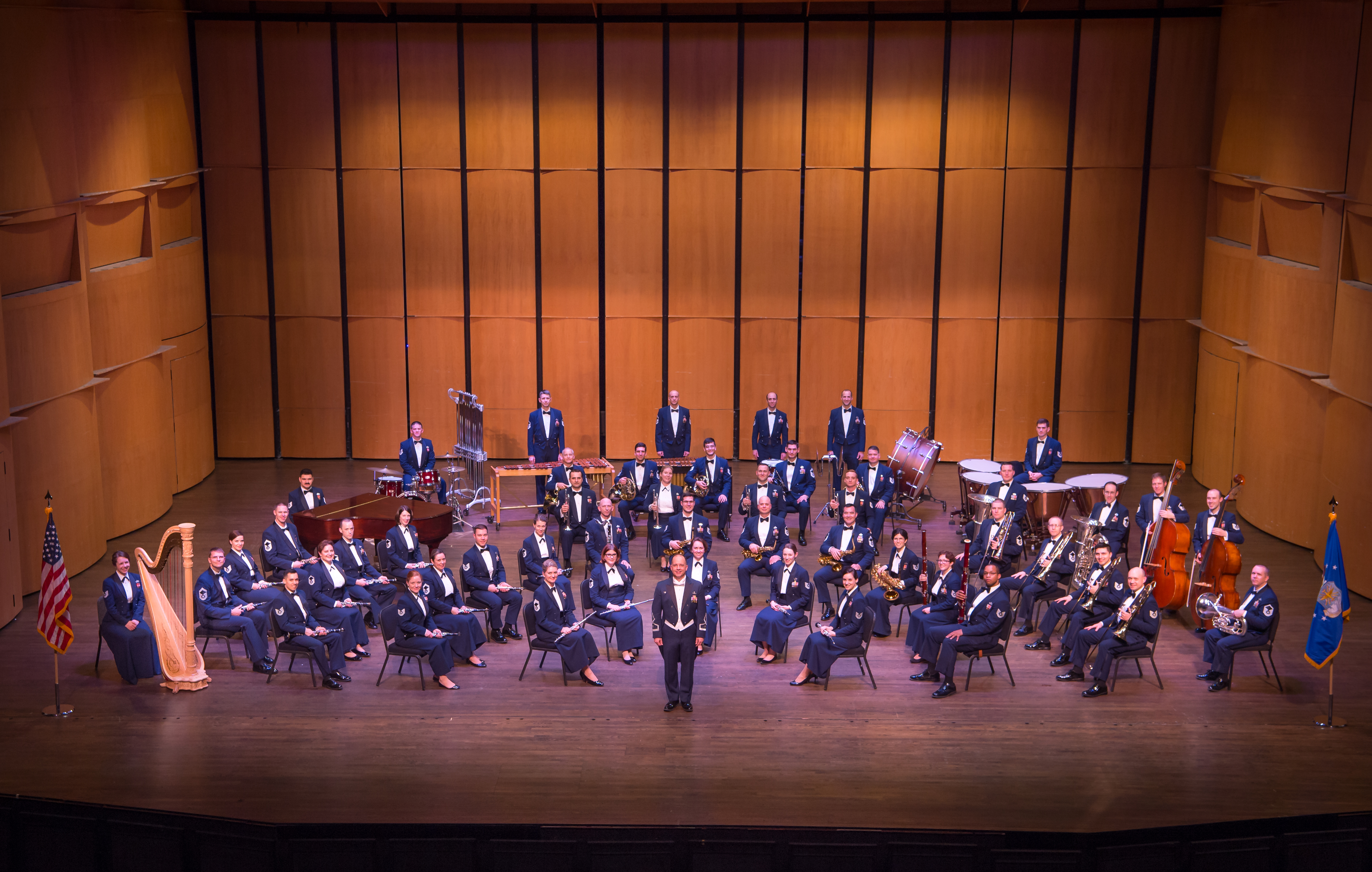
The United States Air Force Concert Band with conductor.

'The United States Air Force Concert Band' is the largest ensemble of the Air Force Band. This symphonic wind ensemble presents over 100 concerts annually and performs a wide variety of repertoire from light classics, popular favorites and instrumental features, to classical transcriptions and original works for the band idiom. The Concert Band performs regularly for the general public in the greater Washington, D.C., area and on biannual community relations tours throughout the United States. It has been a featured ensemble at gatherings of professional musical organizations, including the American Bandmasters Association, National Band Association, World Association of Symphonic Bands and Ensembles, College Band Directors National Association, Music Educators National Conference and The Midwest Band and Orchestra Clinic.

The USAF Concert Band
Birds of Thunder
Composed MSgt John Bliss

=== The Singing Sergeants ===
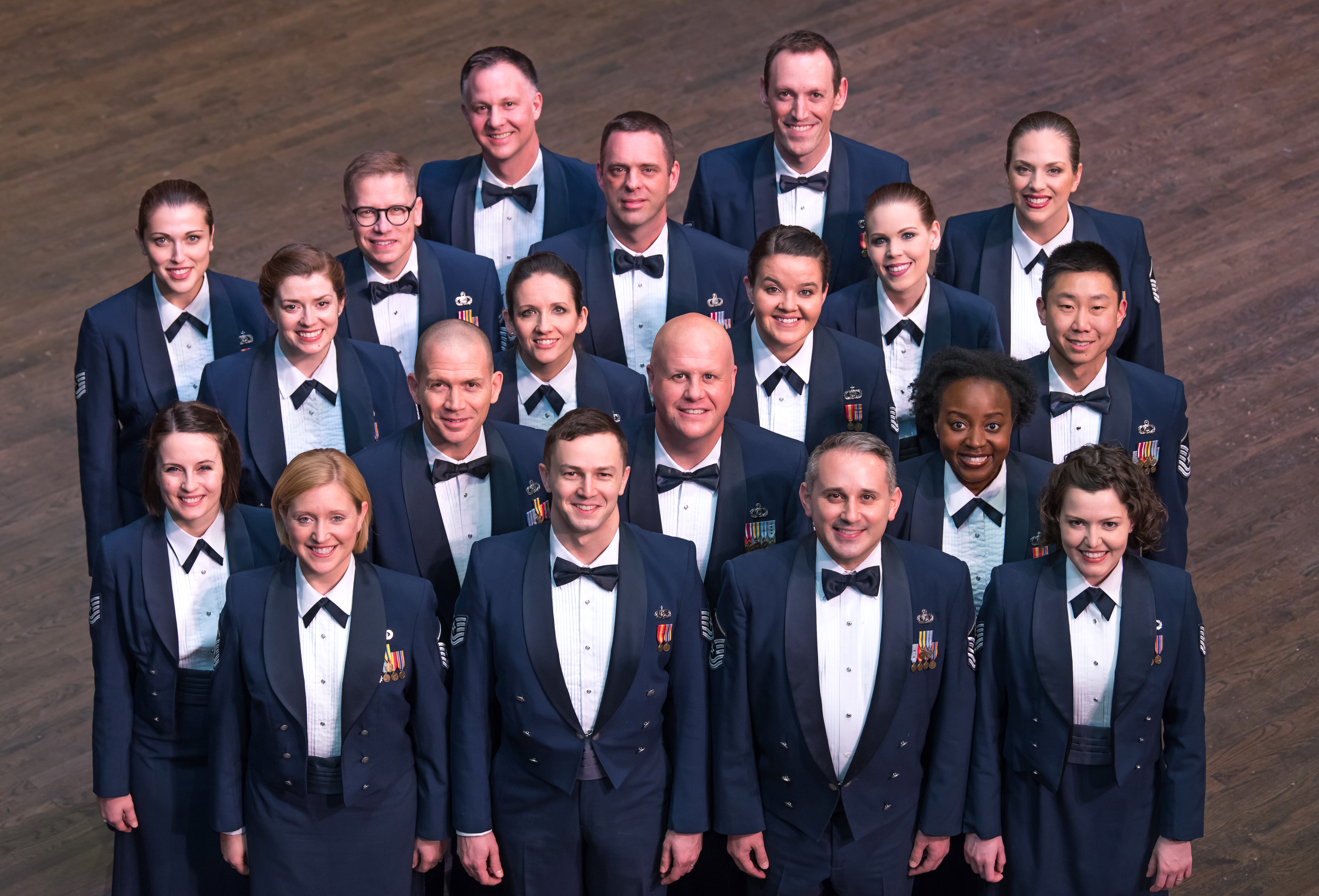
The Singing Sergeants is the official chorus of the United States Air Force.

'The Singing Sergeants' is the official chorus of the United States Air Force. It was formed in 1945 from members of The United States Air Force Concert Band, but is now composed entirely of professional vocalists who have been appointed by audition. The Singing Sergeants have appeared before every chief executive of the United States since President Truman. The group has performed for functions at the White House, State Department, Supreme Court, Congressional, Department of Defense. The chorus tours the nation twice yearly with the Concert Band and has performed at the New York World's Fair, in Carnegie Hall, Lincoln Center, the Dorothy Chandler Pavilion and the John F. Kennedy Center for the Performing Arts. It has also been featured at national and regional gatherings of the American Choral Directors Association and Music Educators National Conference.

The Singing Sergeants
America the Beautiful
Arr. CMSgt Michael Davis/MSgt Larry MacTaggart

=== The Airmen of Note ===
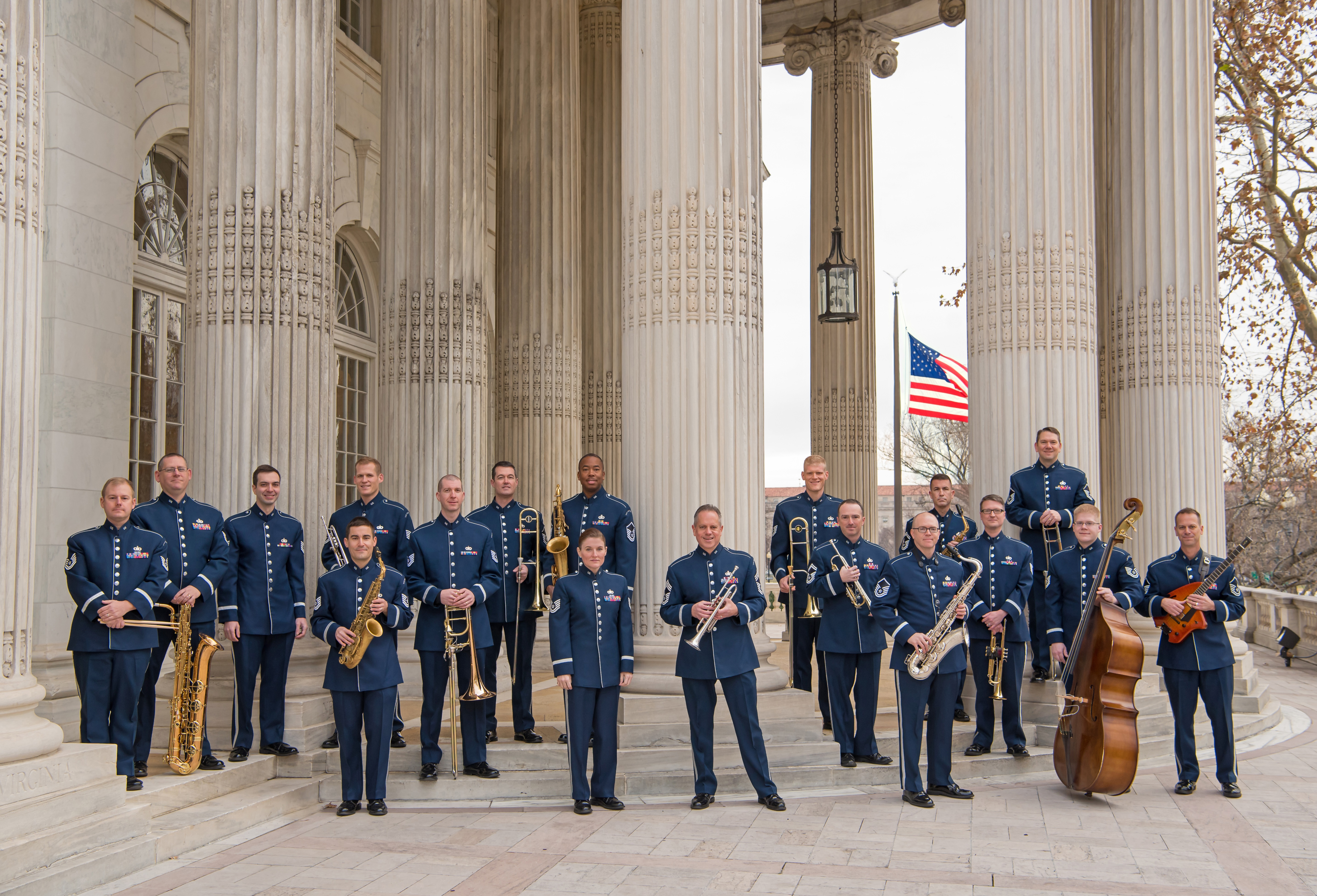
The Airmen of Note is the premier jazz ensemble of the United States Air Force.

The 'Airmen of Note' is the jazz ensemble of the United States Air Force. Created in 1950 to carry on the tradition of Glenn Miller's Army Air Force Band, the Note adopted a more contemporary style under the direction of Sammy Nestico. Beginning in the '70s, Senior Master Sgt. Mike Crotty was the Note's chief arranger for more than 25 years. Master Sgt. Alan Baylock is the Note's current chief arranger. To augment its writing staff, the Airmen of Note has commissioned works by such arrangers as Bob Florence and Bob Mintzer. Sammy Nestico and fellow Note alumnus Tommy Newsom have each composed works for the group as well.

The Airmen of Note
Reunion Dues
Composed by SMSgt Mike Crotty

=== The Air Force Strings ===
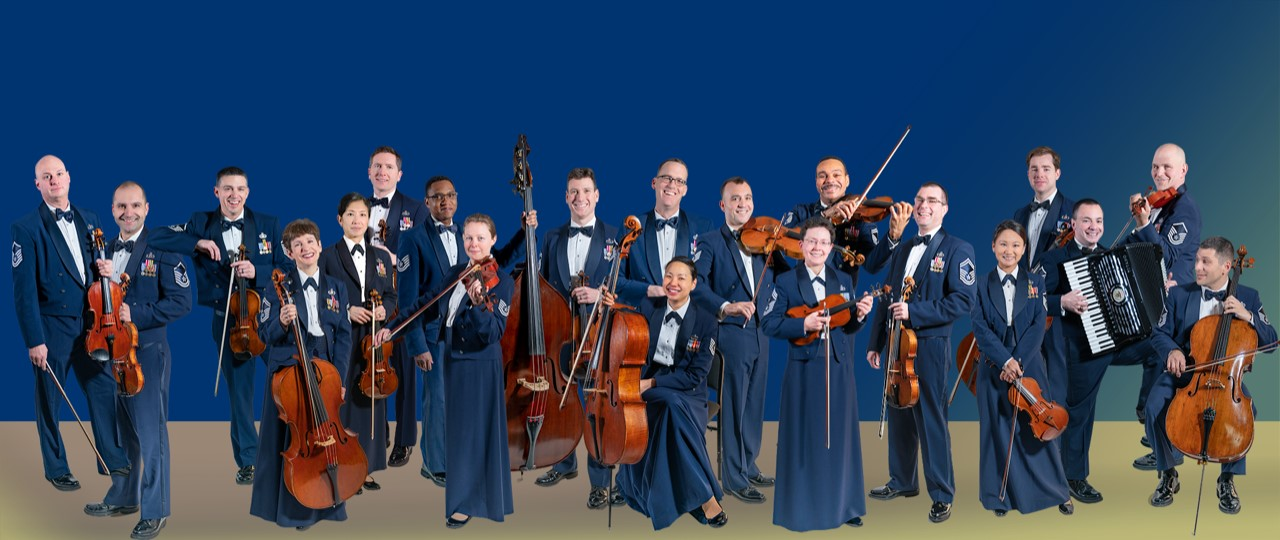
The Air Force Strings is the official string ensemble of The United States Air Force.

The 'Air Force Strings' is composed of 22 musicians who perform in a variety of musical settings, including a strolling formation known as the Strolling Strings, a traditional string orchestra and combined with members of the Concert Band to form a small symphony orchestra. Its members appear regularly as soloists, and in duo, trio and string quartet ensembles, to present chamber concert performances, and provide entertainment and ambient music for official protocol functions. The Air Force Strings performs at the White House, at official dinners hosted by the secretaries of state and defense, on Capitol Hill for members of Congress, and at official diplomatic events hosted by the chairman of the Joint Chiefs of Staff and Chief of Staff of the Air Force.

The Air Force Strings
Strauss Waltz Medley
Arr. MSgt (Ret.) Charles Granofsky

=== The Ceremonial Brass ===
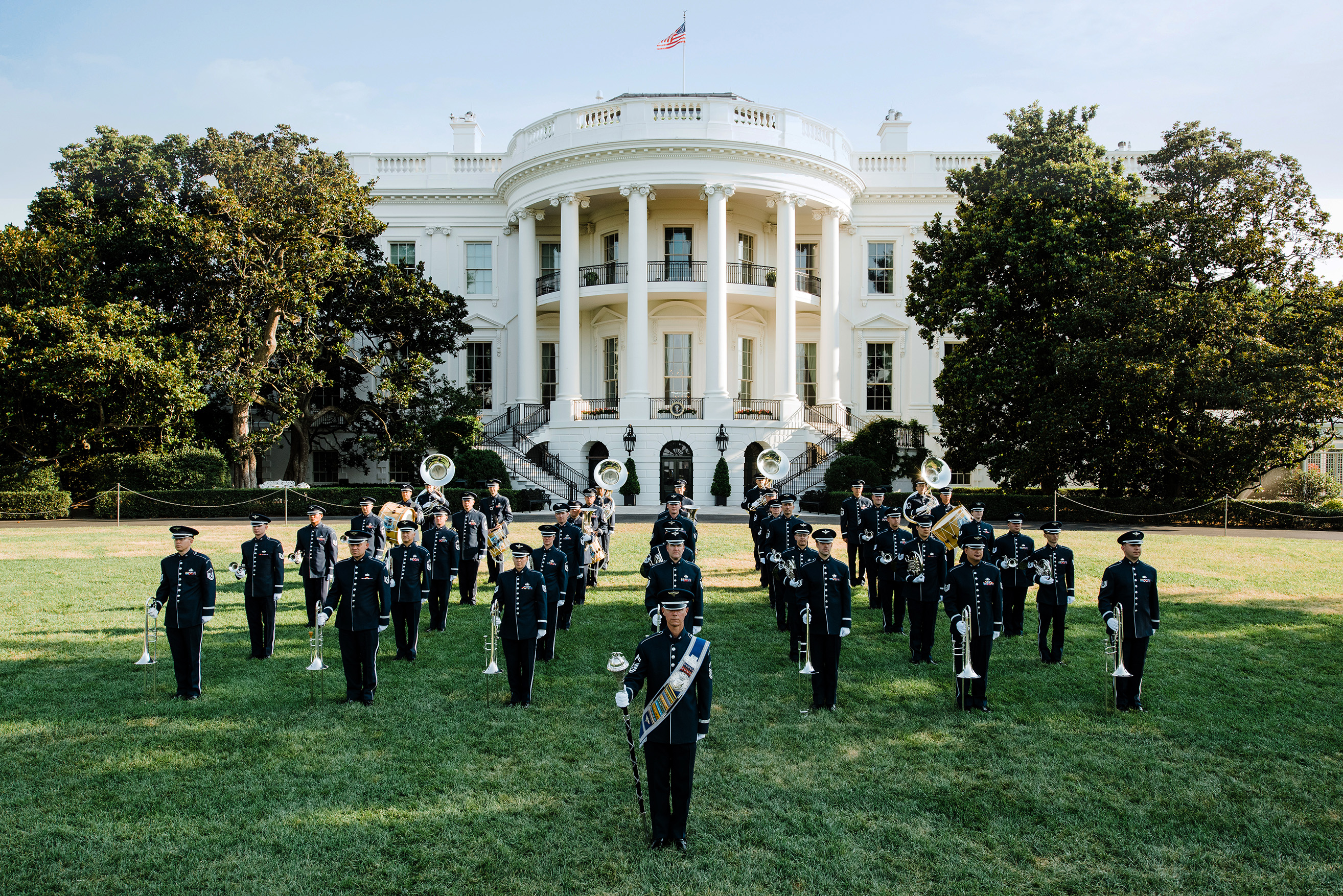
The Ceremonial Brass is the official ceremonial ensemble of The United States Air Force.

The 'Ceremonial Brass'. Brass music has played an important role in public gatherings and ceremonies for hundreds of years and military leaders have often chosen brass bands to perform signals, alarms, and other outdoor ceremonial and concert music. The Ceremonial Brass continues this tradition by providing musical support for state arrivals at the White House, full honor arrivals for foreign dignitaries at the Pentagon, retirements, changes of command, awards ceremonies, patriotic programs and funerals at Arlington National Cemetery. The group performs more than 300 ensemble and 300 solo performances per year. It represented the United States Air Force at the 50th anniversary of V.E. Day celebration in Moscow, as well as in military tattoo ceremonies in the Netherlands, Sweden and Norway. Additionally, the Ceremonial Brass has made numerous appearances on radio and national television, including Fourth of July performances on NBC's Today Show.

The Ceremonial Brass
Honor With Dignity
MSgt Jari Villanueva

=== Max Impact ===
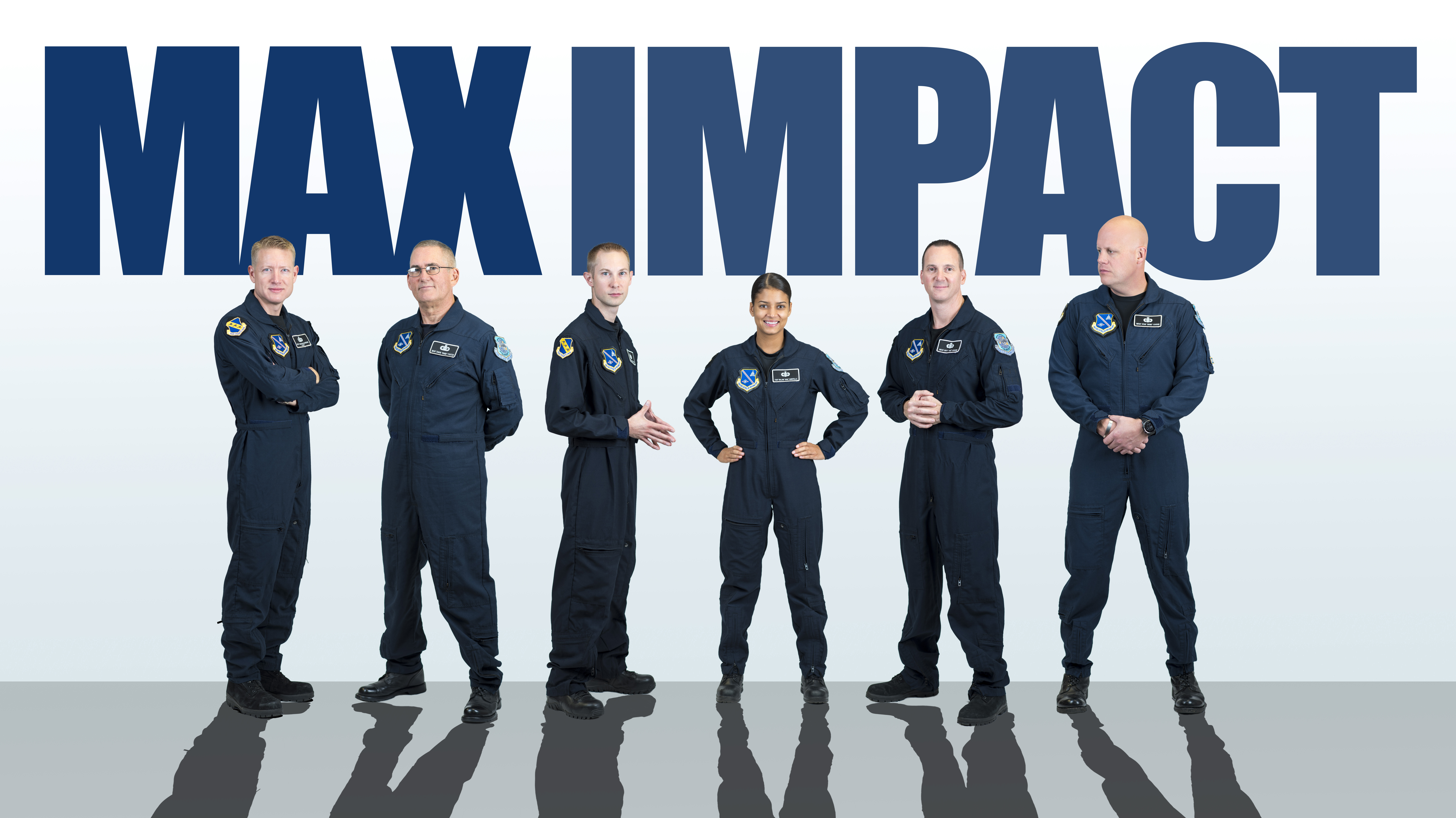
Max Impact is the premier rock band of the United States Air Force.

'Max Impact' is the premier rock band of the United States Air Force consisting of two vocalists and supported by a four-piece rhythm section. They perform classic and current rock and country hits, as well as patriotic songs. Original Max Impact songs are also regularly featured. In addition to performances in the United States, Max Impact has deployed to the U.S. Central Command area of responsibility in support of Operation Enduring Freedom and Operation Iraqi Freedom.

Max Impact
Locked and Loaded
Music by TSgt Matthew Geist, Lyrics by TSgt Robert Smith & MSgt Ryan Carson

== Personnel ==
Leaders

Date	Name
1941–1944	Alf Heiberg
1944–1963	George S. Howard
1963–1964	Harry H. Meuser
1964–1985	Arnald D. Gabriel
1985–1990	James M. Bankhead
1990–1991	Amy R. Mills
1991–1995	Alan R. Bonner
January – May 1995	Mark R. Peterson
1995–2002	Lowell E. Graham
2002–2009	Dennis M. Layendecker
2009–2010	Alan C. Sierichs
2010 – January 2012	A. Philip Waite
2012 – January 2019	Larry H. Lang
January 2019 – present	Don Schofield

== Lineage ==
- Constituted as the Air Force Band, Bolling Field on 24 September 1941

Activated on 1 October 1941
Redesignated Army Air Forces Band, Bolling Field on 10 June 1942
Redesignated Air Force Band on 26 September 1947
Inactivated on 5 March 1948
Redesignated The United States Air Force Band on 6 April 1949
Activated on 25 April 1949
Consolidated with United States Air Force Band on 19 March 1979

United States Air Force Band

- Designated as United States Air Force Band on 9 February 1948

Organized on 5 March 1948
Discontinued on 25 April 1949
Consolidated with The United States Air Force Band on 19 March 1979

=== Assignments ===
- Air Force Combat Command (later Army Air Forces), 1 October 1941 (attached to the European Theater of Operations, 16 December 1944 – c. 29 March 1945
- Continental Air Forces (later Strategic Air Command), 17 July 1945
- Bolling Field Command (later Headquarters Command, USAF), 15 Dec 1946
- 1100th Air Base Wing, 1 December 1957
- Headquarters Command, USAF, 16 July 1964
- 76th Airlift Division, 1 July 1976
- 76th Military Airlift Wing, 1 October 1977
- 76th Airlift Division, 15 December 1980 (attached to Air Force District of Washington, Provisional after 15 July 1985)
- Air Force District of Washington, 1 October 1985
- 11th Operations Group, 15 Jul 1994 – present

=== Stations ===
- Bolling Field (later Bolling Air Force Base, Joint Base Bolling-Anacostia), 1 October 1941 – present
