= 76th Reserve Division =

76th Reserve Division may refer to:

- 76th Reserve Infantry Division (People's Republic of China)
- 76th Reserve Division (German Empire)

== See also ==
- 76th Division (disambiguation)
