= Archer L. Durham =

American Air Force major general (born 1932)

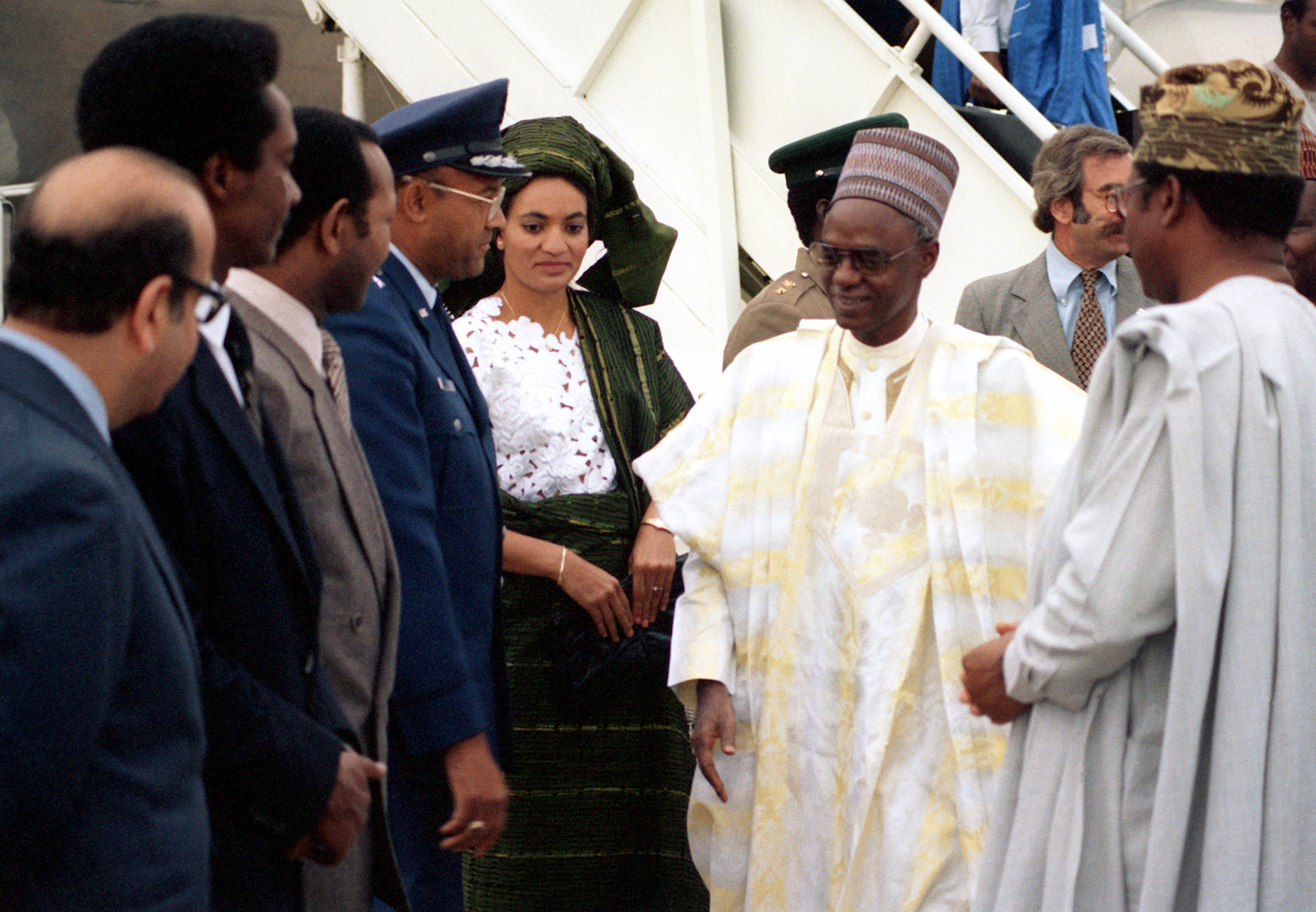
- President Sharari of NIGERIA is greeted by BGEN Archer Durham upon his arrival for a visit.
- Born: Archer Lyman Durham; 1932 (age 93–94); Pasadena, California, U.S.
- Education: Utah State University; George Washington University
- Military career
- Allegiance: United States
- Branch: United States Air Force
- Service years: 1953–1989
- Rank: Major general
- Commands: 436th Military Airlift Wing; 76th Military Airlift Division; 1606th Air Base Wing

Archer Lyman Durham (born 1932) is a retired United States Air Force major general and former federal official. A command pilot with more than 6,000 flying hours, he served 36 years on active duty (1953–1989) as a career airlift officer, and later served as Assistant Secretary of Energy for Human Resources and Administration from 1993 to 1998.

Durham was born in Pasadena, California, in 1932. He entered the Air Force in January 1953 as an aviation cadet and received his pilot wings at Laredo Air Force Base, Texas, in April 1954. He earned a Bachelor of Science from Utah State University in 1960 and a Master of Science from George Washington University in 1975.

Durham's commands included the 1606th Air Base Wing at Kirtland Air Force Base, the 436th Military Airlift Wing at Dover Air Force Base, and the 76th Military Airlift Division at Andrews Air Force Base. He later served as director of deployment at United States Transportation Command, and was promoted to major general in 1984. Durham retired in 1989.

In 1993 President Bill Clinton nominated Durham as Assistant Secretary of Energy for Human Resources and Administration; he oversaw administration for a workforce of more than 14,000 and signed DOE Manual 450.3-1 in 1996.

A citizen of the Cherokee Nation, Durham was presented the tribe's Medal of Patriotism in 2024.
