= William C. Norris (general) =

United States Air Force general (1926–2024)

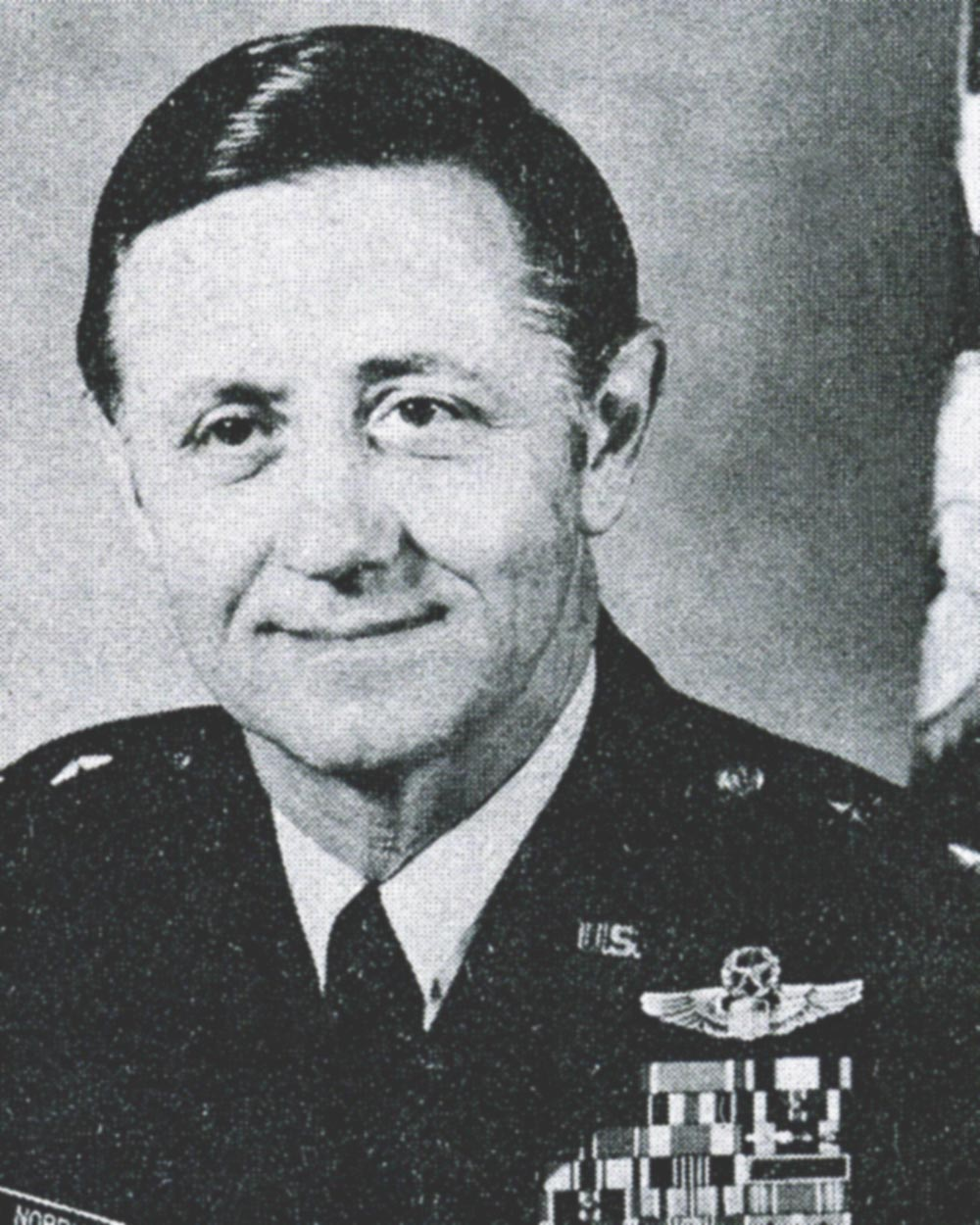
- Norris in 1970
- Born: 20 September 1926; Port Jervis, New York, U.S.
- Died: 4 November 2024 (aged 98); Niceville, Florida, U.S.
- Burial place: Minnesota State Veterans Cemetery, Redwood Falls, MN
- Military career
- Allegiance: United States of America
- Branch: United States Air Force
- Service years: 1945–1980
- Rank: Major general
- Commands: 333rd Tactical Fighter Squadron; 20th Tactical Fighter Wing; 76th Airlift Division; Third Air Force
- Conflicts: Korean War; Vietnam War
- Awards: Air Force Cross; Distinguished Service Medal; Silver Star; Distinguished Flying Cross (2); Bronze Star Medal; Meritorious Service Medal; Air Medal (13)

William Clark Norris (20 September 1926 – 4 November 2024) was a major general in the United States Air Force.

== Early life and education ==
Norris was born in Port Jervis, New York on 20 September 1926. He graduated from Port Jervis High School in 1945.

== Military career ==
Norris enlisted in the Army Air Force in February 1945. He entered pilot training at Goodfellow Air Force Base, Texas, in February 1948, and graduated at Williams Air Force Base, Arizona, in February 1949 with a commission as a second lieutenant.

In 1949 he was assigned to the 20th Fighter Group at Shaw Air Force Base, South Carolina, flying Republic F-84 Thunderjets. In July 1950, he took part with the 20th in the first Atlantic crossing of F-84 aircraft to Manston, England. In December 1950, the 20th deployed back across the Atlantic to Shaw Air Force Base. In March 1951, Norris was assigned to Japan flying F-80C aircraft in the air defense system. In April 1951, he volunteered to fly F-51s in Korea and was assigned to the 39th Fighter-Interceptor Squadron of the 18th Fighter-Bomber Wing. He later became the operations officer. He completed 100 combat missions over North Korea.

From 1952 through 1959, he was assigned to the 54th Fighter-Interceptor Squadron, Ellsworth Air Force Base, South Dakota, during which time he served as its operations officer for three years. In January 1959, he was transferred to the 449th Fighter-Interceptor Squadron at Ladd Air Force Base, Alaska, where he later became chief of the Fighter-Operations Branch of the 11th Air Division. He entered the Air Command and Staff College at Maxwell Air Force Base, Alabama, in September 1961 and graduated in June 1962.

He then was assigned to the Directorate of Operations, Air Defense Command, at Ent Air Force Base, Colorado. In June 1965, he was transferred to Tyndall Air Force Base, Florida, and served first as chief of the Standardization and Evaluation Division, 4756th Air Defense Wing, and later as commander of the Air Defense Command Fighter-Interceptor Weapons School.

He went to Southeast Asia in November 1966 and served at Takhli Royal Thai Air Force Base, as chief of the Operations Branch, 355th Tactical Fighter Wing. In January 1967, he was assigned as commander of the 333rd Tactical Fighter Squadron, equipped with Republic F-105 Thunderchief aircraft. During this period, he completed 100 combat missions over North Vietnam.

On 12 August 1967 Norris led a strike force of twenty F-105 aircraft against a North Vietnamese target. Evading surface-to-air missiles, he positioned his force for the bomb run. Four Vietnam People's Air Force MiG-17s engaged his flight from the rear. Norris turned toward the MiGs, drew them away from his attack force, eluded them, and returned to successfully attack the target. For his actions he was awarded the Air Force Cross.

In October 1967, he was transferred to the Pentagon as assistant executive officer to the chief of the National Guard Bureau. In August 1968, he returned to the Aerospace Defense Command (formerly Air Defense Command) headquarters as director, Operational Readiness Inspection. He entered the Air War College at Maxwell Air Force Base in August 1970 and graduated in June 1971.

He next was assigned to the U.S. Air Forces in Europe (USAFE) at Hahn Air Base, West Germany, as vice commander of the 50th Tactical Fighter Wing. He assumed command of the 50th in October 1971. In February 1973, he was promoted to Brigadier general and was named commander of the 20th Tactical Fighter Wing at Royal Air Force Station Upper Heyford, England. He assumed duties as deputy chief of staff, plans, USAFE, with headquarters at Ramstein Air Base, West Germany, in November 1973, and was appointed USAFE inspector general in July 1974.

In August 1975, he became commander of Headquarters Command, U.S. Air Force, with headquarters at Bolling Air Force Base, Washington, D.C. Upon the disestablishment of the command on June 30, 1976, Norris was named commander of the 76th Airlift Division, Andrews Air Force Base, Maryland. He was promoted to the grade of Major general on 6 February 1976, with date of rank of 13 June 1973. He assumed command of Third Air Force on 1 August 1977. He retired from the USAF on 1 July 1980.

He was a command pilot and flew 11 different fighter aircraft.

== Death ==
Norris died in Niceville, Florida, on 4 November 2024, at the age of 98. He was buried at Minnesota State Veterans Cemetery in Redwood Falls, Minnesota.

== Decorations ==
His military decorations and awards include the Air Force Cross, Distinguished Service Medal, Silver Star, Distinguished Flying Cross with oak leaf cluster, Bronze Star Medal, Meritorious Service Medal, Air Medal with 12 oak leaf clusters, Air Force Commendation Medal, and Army Commendation Medal.
