= T76 =

T76 may refer to:

- Cooper T76, a racing car
- Estonian national road 76
- Honeywell TPE331, a turboprop engine
- INS Kabra (T76), a patrol vessel of the Indian Navy
- Longbow T-76, a sniper rifle
- Rhome Meadows Airport, in Wise County, Texas, United States

== See also ==
- Type 76 (disambiguation)
- 76 (disambiguation)
