= 76 =

76 or Seventy-Six may refer to:

== Common uses ==
- 76 (number), the natural number following 75 and preceding 77
- Years including 76 BC, AD 76, 1776, 1976, 2076

== Places ==
- Seventy Six, Kentucky
- Seventy-Six, Missouri
- Seventy-Six Township, Iowa (disambiguation), several places

== Arts, entertainment, and media ==
- Seventy-Six (novel), an 1823 American novel by John Neal
- 76 (album), the debut album of Dutch trance producer and DJ Armin van Buuren
- '76 (comics), a 2007 comic book limited series by Image Comics
- '76 (film), a 2016 film starring Ramsey Nouah and Rita Dominic

== Brands and enterprises ==
- 76 (gas station), gas station chain in the United States

== Sports ==
- Philadelphia 76ers, NBA team located in Philadelphia

== Others ==
- 76 Freia, a main-belt asteroid

== See also ==
- 76th (disambiguation)
- List of highways numbered 76
