= Type 76 =

Type 76 or 76th type may refer to:

- Type 076 landing helicopter dock (ship class) of the PRC's PLAN
- Type 76 twin 37 mm naval gun (cannon) of the PRC's PLAN
- Lotus Type 76, a British sports car
- Bristol Type 76, a British interwar biplane fighter

== See also ==
- T76 (disambiguation)
