= George S. Howard =

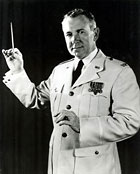
Colonel George S. Howard, USAF Chief of Bands and Music

Colonel George Sallade Howard (February 24, 1902 – September 18, 1995) was commander and conductor of The United States Air Force Band between 1947 and 1963.

== Life and career ==
A native of Reamstown, Pennsylvania, Howard became a student of Patrick Conway at the Conway Military Band School located on the campus of Ithaca College (where he became a member of Phi Mu Alpha Sinfonia) and played clarinet in Conway's professional band. In 1925 he became the band director of Ohio Wesleyan University (where he became a member of Phi Kappa Tau fraternity), and he earned Bachelor of Arts in Music Education from that institution in 1929. He later earned degrees from New York University (MA, 1936); Chicago Musical College (BA, 1934; MM, 1935; DM, 1939); and Ithaca College (HD, 1984).

Howard taught at Mansfield University and later at Penn State University. In 1942, Howard was commissioned into the Army Specialist Corps, and in 1947 Howard's reputation as a conductor led to his commission as leader of the newly formed Air Force Band. He directed the USAF Band and Orchestra until his retirement with the rank of colonel in 1963. During his tenure he established several performing groups, including Airmen of Note, Singing Sergeants, Strolling Strings, and Women in the Air Force Band. He also founded the USAF Bandsman School.

Howard was elected President of the American Bandmasters Association in 1956, and became an Honorary Life Member in 1984. He served as Honorary Life President from 1986 until his death in 1995. The John Philip Sousa Foundation awards the Colonel George S. Howard Citation of Musical Excellence for Military Concert Bands in Col. Howard's memory and the Air Force Band's annual young artists competition is named in his memory.

On January 29, 2005, the service road at the Reading-Lancaster Interchange of the Pennsylvania Turnpike was officially named in his honor.
