= 76th Division =

76th Division may refer to:

== Infantry divisions ==
- 76th Division (People's Republic of China)
- 76th Reserve Infantry Division (People's Republic of China)
- 76th Infantry Division (Wehrmacht), Germany
- 76th Reserve Division (German Empire)
- 76th Infantry Division (Russian Empire)
- 76th Rifle Division, Soviet Union
- 76th Division (Syria)
- 76th Infantry Division (United Kingdom)
- 76th Infantry Division (United States)

== Airborne divisions ==
- 76th Guards Air Assault Division, Russian Army

== Armoured divisions ==
- 76th Tank Division, Soviet Union

== Artillery divisions ==
- 76th Anti-Aircraft Artillery Division, Soviet Union

== Aviation divisions ==
- 76th Air Division, United States
- 76th Airlift Division, United States

== See also ==
- List of military divisions by number
- 76th Brigade (disambiguation)
- 76th Regiment (disambiguation)
- 76th Squadron (disambiguation)
