= 76th Regiment of Foot (disambiguation) =

Four regiments of the British Army have been numbered the 76th Regiment of Foot:

- 76th Regiment of Foot (1745), or Harcourt's Regiment, raised in 1745 and disbanded in 1746
- 76th Regiment of Foot (1756), raised as the 61st Regiment of Foot in 1756, re-numbered as the 76th Regiment of Foot in 1758 and disbanded in 1763
- 76th Regiment of Foot (MacDonald's Highlanders), raised in 1777 and disbanded in 1784
- 76th Regiment of Foot, raised in 1787 and disbanded in 1881

== See also ==
- 76th Regiment (disambiguation)
