= 76 Squadron =

76 Squadron, 76th Squadron or No. 76 Squadron may refer to:

- No. 76 Squadron RAAF, a unit of the Royal Australian Air Force
- No. 76 Squadron RAF, a unit of the United Kingdom Royal Air Force
- 76th Fighter Squadron, a unit of the United States Air Force
- 76th Air Refueling Squadron, a unit of the United States Air Force
- 76th Space Control Squadron, a unit of the United States Air Force
- 76th Airlift Squadron, a unit of the United States Air Force

== See also ==
- 76th Brigade (disambiguation)
- 76th Division (disambiguation)
- 76th Regiment (disambiguation)
