= 76th Armoured Regiment =

Indian Army regiment

76 Armoured Regiment
- Active: 1985 – present
- Country: India
- Allegiance: India
- Branch: Indian Army
- Type: Armoured Corps
- Size: Regiment
- Mottos: कर्मैव धर्म: ’Karmev Dharma’(Work is religion)
- Equipment: T-72 tanks

Commanders
- Colonel of the Regiment: Lieutenant General Rajesh Pushkar

Insignia
- Abbreviation: 76 Armd Regt

76 Armoured Regiment is an armoured regiment of the Indian Army.

== Formation ==
76th Cavalry (Garrison) Regiment had a brief existence in pre-independent India between 1942 and 1946. The regiment was raised in Hissar and consisted of re-employed servicemen and reservists.

The present regiment was raised on 21 March 1985 at Ahmednagar. It has an all-India all-class composition, drawing troops from various castes and religions.

== Equipment ==
The regiment was equipped with the Vijayanta tanks at raising. It is presently equipped with the T-72 main battle tanks.

== Operations ==
Shortly after its formation, the regiment participated in Operation Trident. One of its squadrons took part in Operation Pawan as part of the Indian Peace Keeping Force in Sri Lanka. The regiment took also part in Operation Rakshak, Operation Vijay and Operation Parakram.

The regiment with its Vijayanta tanks took part in amphibious landings during October–November 1987 for operation trials with LST(L) INS Magar.

== Achievements ==
The regiment has been awarded one Vishisht Seva Medal, 8 COAS Commendation Cards, 1 VCOAS Commendation Card and 18 GOC-in-C Commendation Cards.

== Regimental Insignia ==
The Regimental badge comprises two crossed lances with pennons, the numeral ‘76 ‘placed at the crossing of the lances and a scroll at the base with the Regimental Motto in Devanagari script.

The motto of the Regiment is कर्मैव धर्म: (Karmev Dharma), which translates to ‘Work is religion’.
