= 76th Infantry Division (Russian Empire) =

- 76-я пехотная дивизия
- Active: 1914–1918
- Country: Russia
- Allegiance: Tsar of Russia
- Branch: Imperial Russian Army
- Role: Infantry

The 76th Infantry Division (Russian: 76-я пехотная дивизия, 76-ya Pekhotnaya Diviziya) was an infantry formation of the Russian Imperial Army.

== Organization ==
- 1st Brigade
  - 301st Infantry Regiment
  - 302nd Infantry Regiment
- 2nd Brigade
  - 303rd Infantry Regiment
  - 304th Infantry Regiment
