= Andrews Air Force Base =

U.S. airbase

- Camp Springs, Maryland in the United States
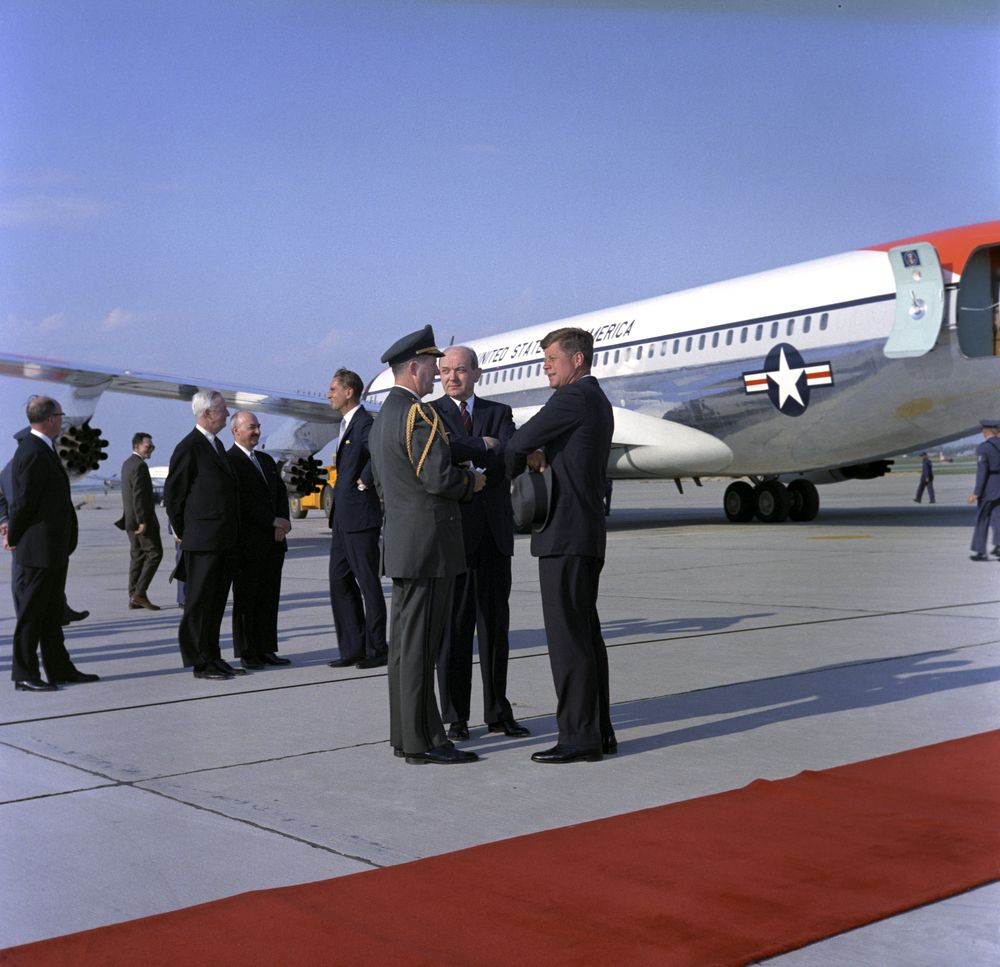
- President John F. Kennedy speaks with Secretary of State, Dean Rusk and Military Aide to the President, General Chester V. Clifton, upon his arrival aboard Air Force One at Andrews Air Force Base, Maryland, following Easter vacation in Palm Beach, Florida, 27 April 1962

Site information
- Type: US Air Force base
- Owner: Department of Defense
- Operator: United States Air Force
- Website: www.andrews.af.mil/

Location
- Location in the United States
- Coordinates: 38°48′39″N 076°52′01″W

Site history
- Built: 1942 (as Camp Springs Air Base)
- In use: 1942 – October 1, 2009
- Fate: Merged in 2009 to become an element of Joint Base Andrews-Naval Air Facility Washington

Airfield information
- Identifiers: IATA: ADW, ICAO: KADW, FAA LID: ADW, WMO: 745940
- Elevation: 85.3 metres (280 ft) AMSL
Runways
Direction	Length and surface
01R/19L	2,973.6 metres (9,756 ft) asphalt/concrete
01L/19R	2,840.1 metres (9,318 ft) concrete

Andrews Air Force Base (Andrews AFB, AAFB) (IATA: ADW, ICAO: KADW, FAA LID: ADW) is the airfield portion of Joint Base Andrews, which is under the jurisdiction of the United States Air Force (USAF). In 2009, Andrews Air Force Base merged with Naval Air Facility Washington to form Joint Base Andrews. Andrews, located near Morningside, Maryland, in suburban Washington, D.C., is the home base of two Boeing VC-25A aircraft with the call sign Air Force One when the president is on board, that serve the president of the United States, and the president is typically flown in and out of Andrews when travelling from Washington, D.C. by plane.

The host unit at Andrews is the 316th Wing, assigned to the Air Force District of Washington. It is responsible for maintaining emergency reaction rotary-wing airlift and other National Capital Region contingency response capabilities critical to national security and for organizing, training, equipping and deploying combat-ready forces for Air and Space Expeditionary Forces (AEFs). The 316th Wing also provides installation security, services and airfield management to support the president, vice president, other U.S. senior leaders and more than 50 tenant organizations and federal agencies.

The 316th Wing provides security, personnel, contracting, finance and infrastructure support for five wings, three headquarters, more than 80 tenant organizations, 148 geographically separated units, and 6,500 airmen in the Pentagon, as well as 60,000 airmen and families in the national capital region and around the world. The 316th Wing supports contingency operations in the capital of the United States with immediate response rotary-assets. It also provides security for the world's highest visibility flight line and is responsible for ceremonial support with the United States Air Force Band, Honor Guard and Air Force Arlington Chaplaincy.

The wing commander is Colonel Tyler R. Schaff, and the command chief master sergeant is Chief Master Sergeant Thomas C. Daniels.

== History ==
Union American Civil War troops used a country church near Camp Springs, Maryland, for sleeping quarters (now named Chapel Two) and on 25 August 1941, President Roosevelt directed use of the land for an airfield.

=== Camp Springs Air Base ===
Camp Springs Air Base was designated on 5 September 1942, and construction began on 16 September 1942. The Maryland World War II Army Airfield of the 1st Air Force was "designated a sub-base of Headquarters, Baltimore AAFld, late Nov 1942"—the 901st Quartermaster Company (Construction) became the base operating unit on 14 December 1942. Camp Springs Army Air Base opened on 2 May 1943, and the airfield became operational 2 May 1943 when the first Republic P-47 Thunderbolts arrived. after the 367th Fighter Squadron was stationed at Camp Springs on 21 April 1943. On 6 June 1943 the Camp Springs headquarters gained command of 4 sub-bases: Baltimore AAFld, Dover Army Airfield, Millville Army Airfield, and Philadelphia Municipal Airport became sub-bases of Camp Springs AAB.

The airfield had 5,500 feet (1,700 m) runways by 1944 when the 90th Fighter Control Squadron was formed (28 March 1944), and the last Camp Springs combat units (e.g., 535th Fighter Escort Squadron) departed for World War II combat on 10 April 1944. Camp Springs was expanded to become the initial headquarters of Continental Air Forces (CONAF) (activated 12 December 1944)—the 161st AAF Base Unit (CONAF) became the "Andrews Field" operating unit on 16 April 1945.

=== Andrews Field ===
Andrews Field was named on 7 February 1945 in honor of Lt Gen. Frank Andrews and in 1946, Andrews was a sub-base of Bolling Field (3 January 1946 – 20 November 1946). Strategic Air Command headquarters transferred from Bolling Field to Andrews. The command of CONAF's Radar Bomb Scoring detachments (e.g., at Dallas Love Field) transferred to Andrews on 17 March 1946 when the "263 AAF BU" was assigned (transferred 23 February 1948) to Carswell AFB.

Andrews was transferred from the Army to the Air Force in 1947, and it was a Headquarters Command installation from 1947 through 1952 and again after 1957. Headquarters Military Air Transport Service controlled the base during the interim period. The year 1947 marked the arrival of the first permanently assigned jet-powered aircraft, the F-80 Shooting Star, at Andrews. The long-lived and versatile training version of the F-80, the T-33, still played an important role in proficiency flying programs at Andrews more than 30 years later.

=== Andrews Air Force Base ===
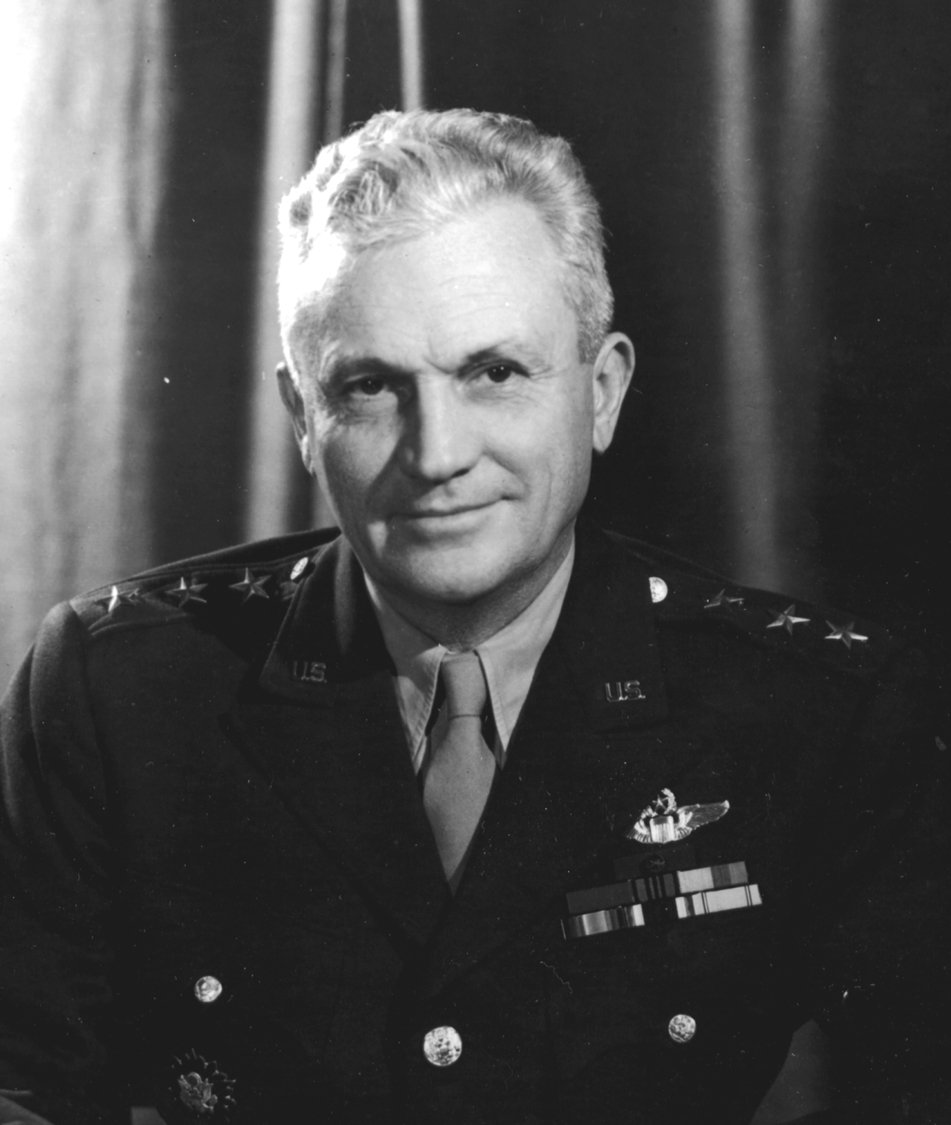
Andrews AFB and Joint Base Andrews are named for Lieutenant General Frank Maxwell Andrews (1884–1943), former Commanding General of United States Forces in the World War II European Theater of Operations. General Andrews organized and commanded the General Headquarters, Air Force (1935–1939), and at the time of his death on 3 May 1943 in the crash of a B-24 Liberator in Iceland, he was Commanding General, United States Forces, European Theater of Operations.

Andrews Air Force Base was designated on 24 June 1948, and in June 1950, Andrews rapidly became involved in combat readiness training for North American B-25 Mitchell medium bomber crews. Combat readiness training and proficiency flying for military pilots assigned non-flying duties in the Washington area have remained two key elements in the local mission since the establishment of the base. HQ Air Research and Development Command (later, Air Force Systems Command) moved to Andrews from Baltimore, 24 June 1958. With the construction of new facilities beginning in 1959, Andrews had become by early 1962 the primary USAF flight installation serving the Washington, DC, area with the closing of the runway at Bolling AFB.

Andrews' air defense role was strengthened in the 1950s with the latest in fighter-interceptor hardware appearing on the flight line. F-94 Starfires, F-102 Delta Daggers and finally, F-106 Delta Darts formed the backbone of the three fighter interceptor squadrons which operated from the base until 1963.

In the late 1950s Andrews began an annual open house and air show on base. This event later evolved into the Department of Defense Joint Services Open House, an annual event that now brings more than 700,000 visitors to the base every year. The open house is held every year over Armed Forces Day weekend.

In the years since 1959, Andrews' flight operations and importance have increased greatly. In 1961, the last of the Military Air Transport Service's flying units at Washington National Airport transferred to Andrews. This was followed a year later by the transfer to Andrews of all fixed-wing flying activities from Bolling Air Force Base. Andrews has become firmly established as the main port of entry for foreign military and government officials en route to Washington and the United States. In July 1961, the official presidential aircraft was stationed here, known as "Air Force One" when the president is on board. Before 1961, the presidential airplane had been kept at Washington National Airport and Bolling AFB.

In 1963, the Naval Air Facility (NAF), originally established at the former NAS Anacostia in 1919, moved to Andrews. The NAF handles Naval VIP flight operations. The Marine Corps detachment that flies the FA-18 Hornet is located here.

In a major reorganization, Headquarters Command, U.S. Air Force, was disbanded 1 July 1976, restructured under the Military Airlift Command as the 76th Airlift Division and transferred its headquarters from Bolling AFB to Andrews. The 76th remained the parent unit of the Andrews host command, redesignated as the 1st Air Base Wing.

In October 1977, the 76th Airlift Division became the 76th Military Airlift Wing. The 1st Air Base Wing was redesignated the 76th Air Base Group, and the 89th Military Airlift Wing became the 89th Military Airlift Group. The 76th MAW remained the parent unit at Andrews. On 15 December 1980, the 76th Airlift Division was reestablished, the 76th Air Base Group became the 1776th Air Base Wing and the 89th Military Airlift Group became the 89th Military Airlift Wing. On 1 October 1985, the 76th Airlift Division was inactivated as the result of activation of the Headquarters Air Force District of Washington at Bolling AFB. The 1776th Air Base Wing was designated the "host wing" for Andrews AFB and assumed base support responsibilities.

During Operation Desert Storm, Andrews handled 16,540 patients in makeshift hospital facilities located in the base tennis center.

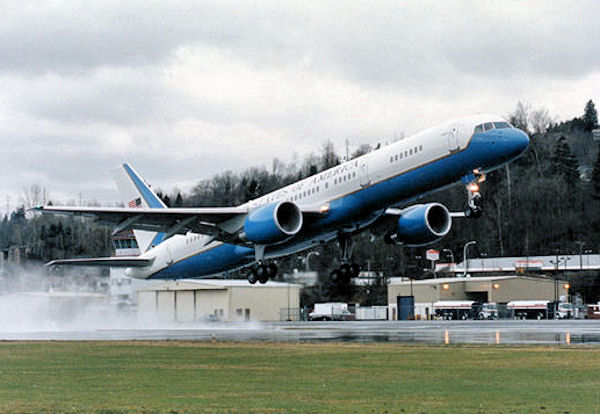
A C-32A, a specially configured version of the Boeing 757-200 commercial intercontinental airliner used for executive/VIP transportation (89th Airlift Wing)

On 12 July 1991, the 89th Military Airlift Wing was redesignated as the 89th Airlift Wing and assumed duties as the host wing at Andrews AFB. Support functions previously performed by the 1776th Air Base Wing now fall under the 89th and the 1776th was inactivated. With the consolidation of the two wings, the newly formed 89th Airlift Wing is one of the largest wings in Air Mobility Command with a work force approaching 9,000 people.

Known as "The President's Wing," the 89th Airlift Wing continues to contribute to Andrews' rich history as the elite Air Mobility Command wing for transporting VIPs around the world. Not only does Andrews provide service for America's senior officials, but also kings, queens, presidents, prime ministers, popes, and local and foreign military leaders make Andrews AFB their first stop in the United States.

On 5 January 2005 the Air Force reactivated the Air Force District of Washington (AFDW) as the single Air Force voice for planning and implementing Air Force and joint solutions within the National Capital Region (NCR). This event brought with it significant changes at Andrews. On 12 May 2006, the 89th Medical Group at Andrews and the 11th Medical Group, Bolling Air Force Base, Washington, D.C. combined into the 79th Medical Wing where it established its headquarters at Andrews. In June 2006, the 316th Wing stood up under the command of AFDW as the new host unit for Andrews Air Force Base and its nearly 50 tenant units to include organizations from the U.S. Army, the Air Force Reserve Command, Air National Guard, Navy Reserve, Marine Corps Reserve and the Civil Air Patrol. The activation of the 316th prompted the transfer of the 1st Helicopter Squadron from the 89th Airlift Wing to the 316th Operations Group. In May 2007 the AFDW, as well as the 844th Communications Group, transferred from Bolling AFB to Andrews AFB.

=== Merger ===
In May 2005, several recommendations relating to Andrews AFB were made by the Base Realignment and Closure (BRAC) Commission. The most significant was to realign Naval Air Facility (NAF) Washington, by relocating its installation management functions to Andrews AFB, thereby establishing Joint Base Andrews-Naval Air Facility Washington.

BRAC also recommended relocating several offices of the Secretary of the Air Force to Andrews from leased office space in Arlington, Virginia, thereby reducing reliance on leased floor space and increasing the security for those activities by locating them within a military installation.

Other changes included the relocation of the Air Force Office of Special Investigations (AFOSI) headquarters from Andrews to Marine Corps Base Quantico, Virginia, and the relocation of the Air Force Flight Standards Agency (AFFSA) and its two C-21A to Will Rogers Air National Guard Base, Oklahoma.

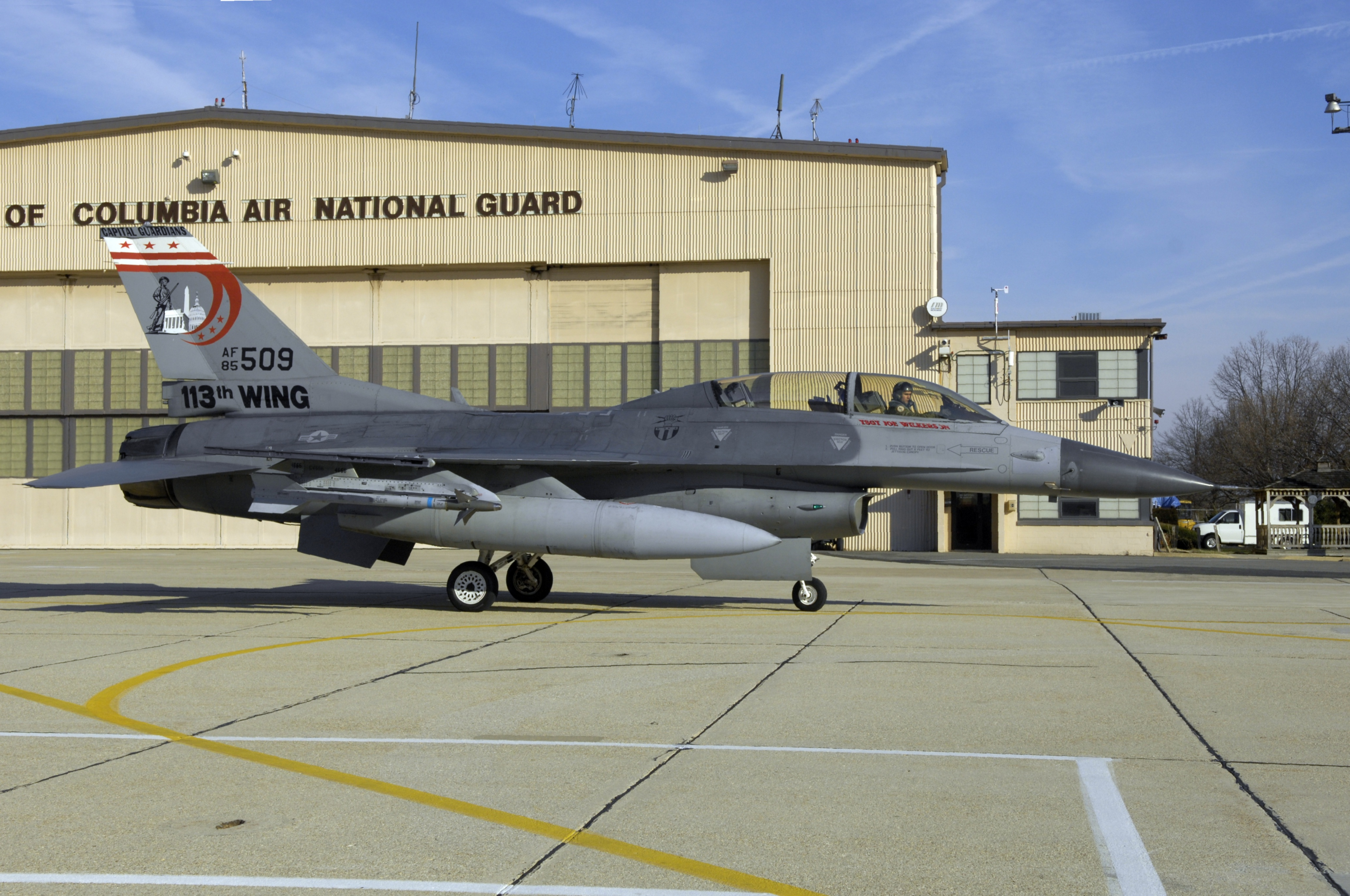
A F-16D Fighting Falcon of the District of Columbia Air National Guard

The merger with NAF Washington was effective from 1 October 2009, when the joint base was established, with the US Air Force being the lead organization providing management and support services for both installations.

Although sharing parallel runways, NAF Washington was originally considered a separate air installation and maintained a separate Navy/Marine Corps–unique FAA airfield identifier of NSF and an ICAO airfield identifier of KNSF. Prior to merging, these separate airfield identifiers were discontinued on 29 March 2009 and all flight operations in and out of NAF Washington now use the Andrews AFB airfield identifiers of ADW and KADW as appropriate.

On 1 October 2010; the Air Force completed the merge of the 11th Wing and the 316th. The 11th Wing became the host base organization for Joint Base Andrews.

=== Major commands to which assigned ===
- First Air Force, 5 September 1942
- Continental Air Forces, 17 April 1945

Redesignated: Strategic Air Command, 21 March 1946

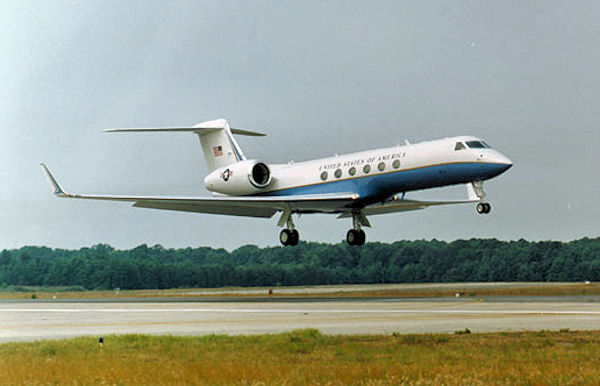
C-37A Gulfstream V (89th Airlift Wing)

- Military Air Transport Service, 16 November 1948
- Bolling Field Command, 8 April 1949

Air Defense Command (Attached)

Eastern Air Defense Force, 13 August 1950 – 1 July 1963

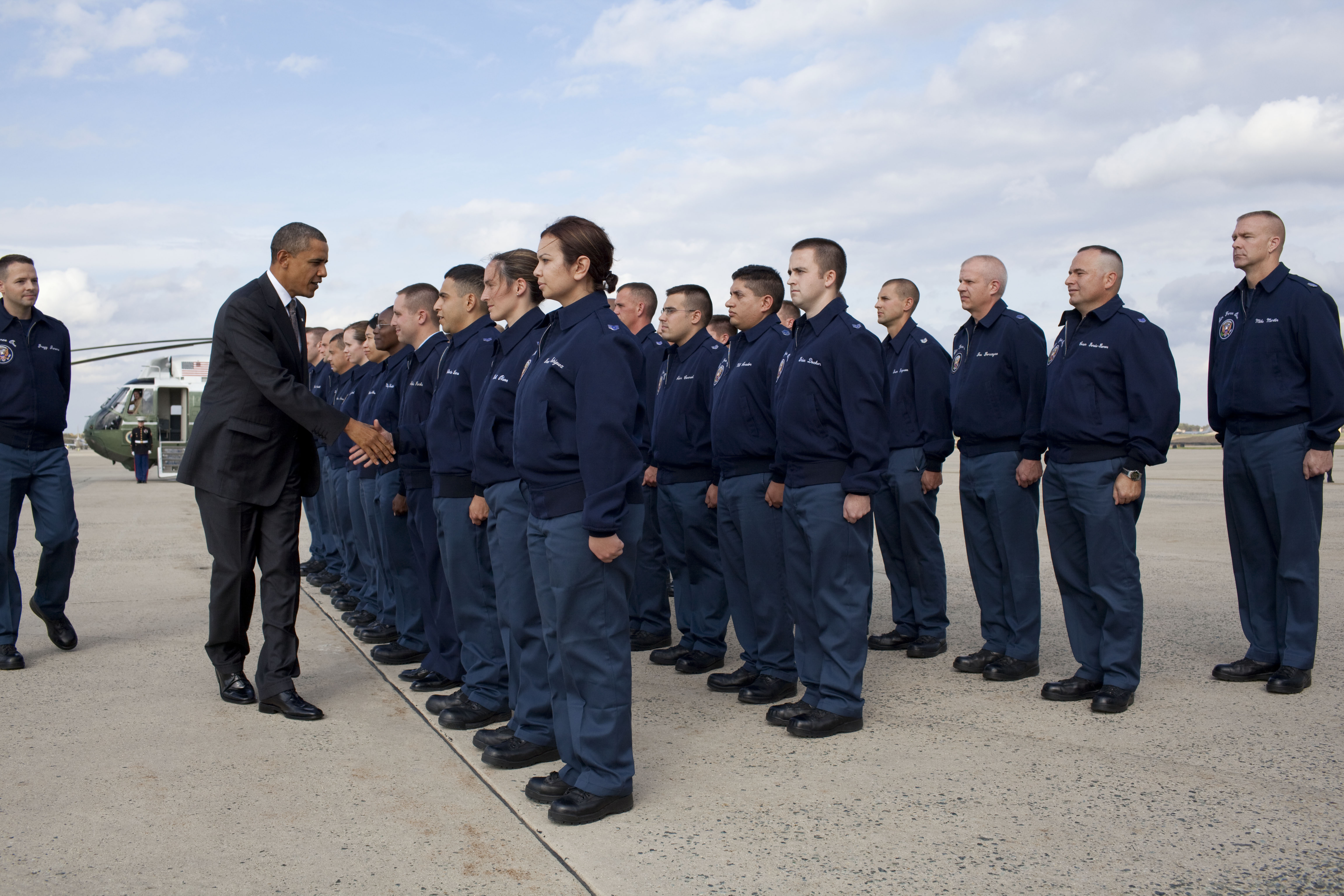
- President Barack Obama greets personnel at the base in October 2010.
  Military Air Transport Service, 1 August 1952
- Bolling Field Command, 1 October 1957

Redesignated: Headquarters Command, USAF, 17 March 1958

- Military Airlift Command, 1 July 1976
- Air Force District of Washington, 12 July 1991
- Air Mobility Command, 15 July 1994
- Air Force District of Washington, 22 June 2006–present

=== Major units assigned ===
- 394th Base HQ & Air Base Squadron, 14 July 1943 – 10 April 1944
- 122d AAF Base Unit, 10 April 1944 – 16 April 1945
- 161st AAF Base Unit, 10 April 1944 – 15 November 1945
- 64th AAF Base Unit, 16 April 1945 – 15 August 1947
- 263d AAF (later AF) Base Unit, 17 March 1946 – 23 February 1948
- 443d AAF (later AF) Base Unit, 25 June 1946 – 27 June 1949
- HQ Strategic Air Command, 20 October 1946 – 8 November 1948
- 60th AAF (later AF) Base Unit, 21 October 1946 – 1 August 1948
- AAF (later AF) Separation Point, 12 March 1947 – 27 October 1949
- 3d Combat Fighter Wing VLR, 1 April 1947 – 15 August 1957
- 311th Reconnaissance Wing (311th Air Division), 1 June 1947 – 19 June 1948
- 2d Bombardment Group, 1 July – 24 September 1947
- 44th Bombardment Group, 1 July 1947 – 6 September 1948
- 90th Bombardment Group, 1 July 1947 – 19 July 1948
- 98th Bombardment Group, 1 July 1947 – 24 September 1947
- 303d Bombardment Group, 1 July 1947 – 6 September 1948
- 305th Bombardment Group, 1 July 1947 – 6 September 1948
- 306th Bombardment Group, 1 July 1947 – 1 August 1948
- 4th Fighter Wing, 15 August 1947 – 25 April 1949
- 33d Fighter Group, 25 August – 16 September 1947
- HQ, Air Weather Service (AWS), 22 November 1948 – 22 June 1958
- HQ Airborne Air Control Service (AACS), 22 November 1948 – 14 January 1958
- HQ Military Air Transport Service (MATS), 1 December 1948 – 15 January 1958
- 1050th (later 1401st, later 1001st) Air Base Wing, 1 April 1949 – 1 July 1969
- 8500th Air Weather Wing, 1 September 1949 – 23 June 1951
- 335th Fighter-Interceptor Squadron, 13 August – 10 November 1950
- 113th Fighter-Interceptor Wing, 1–16 February 1951
- HQ Air Supply & Communication Service, 23 February 1951 – 1 January 1954
- 95th Fighter-Interceptor Squadron, 1 November 1952 – 1 July 1963
- 1401st (later 1001st, later 1st) Transport (later Airlift) Squadron, 24 August 1952–present
- 85th Air Division, 5 September 1955 – 1 September 1958
- 459th Troop Carrier (Later Military Airlift, later Air Refueling) Wing, 26 January 1955–present
- Aerial Port of Embarkation, 6 January 1958 – 15 February 1978
- HQ Air Force Research & Development (later Systems Command), 24 January 1958 – 1 July 1992
- Malcolm Grow USAF Medical Center, 1 August 1958 – 1 April 2015
- 1254th Air Transport (later 89th Military Airlift, later Airlift) Wing, 10 July 1961–present
- 909th Troop Carrier (later Military Airlift) Group, 28 December 1962 – 1 July 1976
- 6th Weather Wing, 8 October 1965 – 1 August 1975
- 1st Air Base Wing, 1 July 1969 – 30 September 1977
- 76th Airlift Division, 1 March 1976 – 30 September 1977

Redesignated: 76th Military Airlift Wing, 30 September 1977 – 16 December 1980
Redesignated: 76th Airlift Division, 15 December 1980 – 1 October 1985

- 1776th Air Base Wing, 15 December 1980 – 12 July 1991
- 79th Medical Wing, 12 May 2006 – 1 April 2015
- 316th Wing, 1 June 2006 – 30 September 2010, 1 October 2020 – present
- 11th Wing, 1 October 2010 – 30 September 2020
- Air Force District of Washington, 1 May 2007 – present
- U.S. Air Force Office of Special Investigations Headquarters

== Airlines ==
Sun Country Airlines, Delta, and various other scheduled airlines can be seen occasionally flying into ADW for para-military charters, however as of February 2025, scheduled flights out of Andrews Air Force Base are not available.

== Joint Base Andrews ==
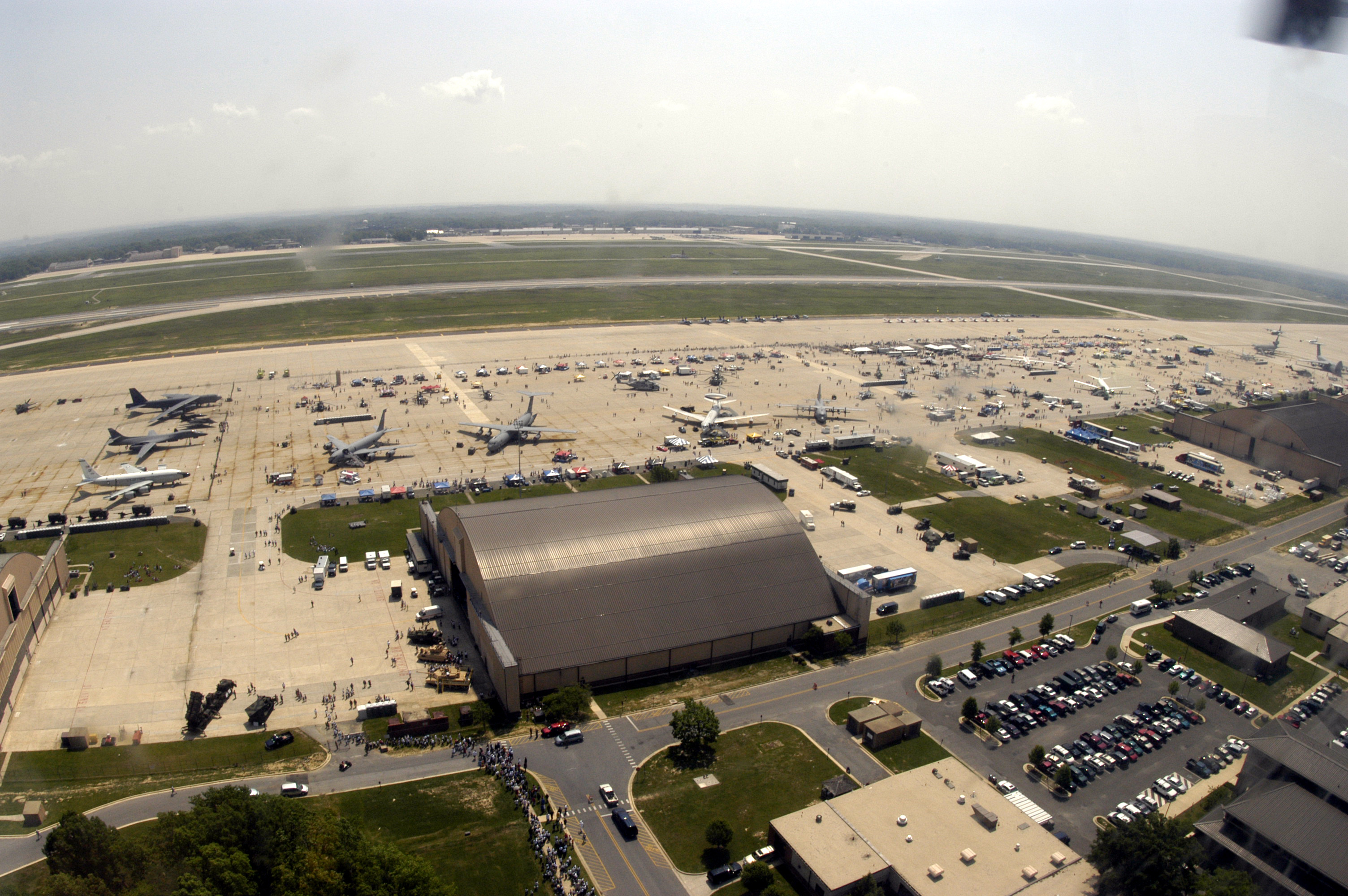
Overview of Andrews flight line

The base is widely known for serving as the home base of two Boeing VC-25A aircraft which use the call sign Air Force One while the President of the United States is on board. The Boeing C-32A, which is used by the Vice President of the United States, is also based at Andrews.

The host at Andrews is the 11th Wing (11 WG), assigned to the Air Force District of Washington. The 11 WG is responsible for maintaining emergency reaction rotary-wing airlift and other National Capital Region contingency response capabilities critical to national security, and for organizing, training, equipping and deploying combat-ready forces for Air and Space Expeditionary Forces (AEFs).

See Joint Base Andrews for a list of units and aircraft now based at the installation.

== Geography ==
Andrews Air Force Base is located at 38°48′13″N 76°52′17″W (38.803490, −76.871508), a few miles southeast of Washington, D.C. near the town of Morningside in Prince George's County, Maryland. It is delineated as a census-designated place by the United States Census Bureau. The CDP has a total area of 6.9 square miles (18.0 km^{2}), of which 6.9 square miles (17.9 km^{2}) is land and 0.04 square miles (0.1 km^{2}), or 0.51%, is water.

There are two runways on the base; the western runway is 11,300 feet (3,400 m) in length, and the eastern runway is 9,750 feet (2,970 m) in length. Two additional runways have been removed, including a minor third runway between the two main runways, and a small T-shaped runway which was closed and demolished by 2008.

== Demographics ==
Historical population
Census	Pop.	Note	%±
1970	6,418		—
1980	10,064		56.8%
1990	10,228		1.6%
2000	7,925		−22.5%
2010	2,973		−62.5%
2020	3,025		1.7%
U.S. Decennial Census; 2010 2020

For statistical purposes the base is delineated as a census-designated place (Andrews AFB CDP) by the U.S. Census Bureau. As of the 2020 census, the resident population was 3,025.

=== 2020 census ===
Andrews AFB CDP, Maryland – Racial and ethnic composition Note: the US Census treats Hispanic/Latino as an ethnic category. This table excludes Latinos from the racial categories and assigns them to a separate category. Hispanics/Latinos may be of any race.
Race / Ethnicity (NH = Non-Hispanic)	Pop 2000	Pop 2010	Pop 2020	% 2000	% 2010	% 2020
White alone (NH)	4,890	1,664	1,355	61.70%	55.97%	44.79%
Black or African American alone (NH)	1,756	637	758	22.16%	21.43%	25.06%
Native American or Alaska Native alone (NH)	44	10	22	0.56%	0.34%	0.73%
Asian alone (NH)	244	70	152	3.08%	2.35%	5.02%
Native Hawaiian or Pacific Islander alone (NH)	9	16	14	0.11%	0.54%	0.46%
Other race alone (NH)	30	16	14	0.38%	0.54%	0.46%
Mixed race or Multiracial (NH)	261	143	232	3.29%	4.81%	7.67%
Hispanic or Latino (any race)	691	417	478	8.72%	14.03%	15.80%
Total	7,925	2,973	3,025	100.00%	100.00%	100.00%

=== 2000 Census ===
As of the census of 2000, there were 7,925 people, 1,932 households, and 1,864 families residing in the CDP. The population density was 1,158.9 inhabitants per square mile (447.5/km^{2}). There were 2,133 housing units at an average density of 311.9 sq mi (120.4/km^{2}). The racial makeup of the base was 65.3% White, 22.8% African American, 0.6% Native American, 3.2% Asian, 0.1% Pacific Islander, 3.7% from other races, and 4.4% from two or more races. Hispanic or Latino people of any race were 8.7% of the population.

There were 1,932 households, out of which 75.9% had children under the age of 18 living with them, 86.1% were married couples living together, 7.3% had a female householder with no husband present, and 3.5% were non-families. 3.2% of all households were made up of individuals, none of whom was 65 years of age or older. The average household size was 3.39 and the average family size was 3.44.

In the CDP, the population was spread out, with 35.0% under the age of 18, 16.3% from 18 to 24, 44.9% from 25 to 44, 3.6% from 45 to 64, and 0.2% who were 65 years of age or older. The median age was 24 years. For every 100 females, there were 119.7 males. For every 100 females age 18 and over, there were 126.0 males.

The median income for a household in the base was $44,310, and the median income for a family was $42,866. Males had a median income of $27,070 versus $27,308 for females. The per capita income for the base was $16,520. About 2.6% of families and 2.4% of the population were below the poverty line, including of the total population, 2.8% of those under the age of 18 and none of those 65 and older.

== Motor sports ==
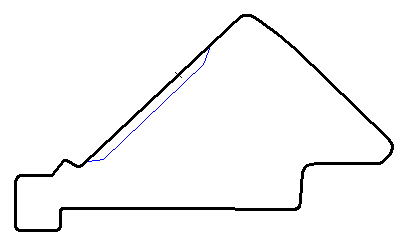
Andrews AFB race track (1954)

On 2 May 1954, sports car races were held at the base, using a 4.3-mile (6.9 km) circuit made up of runways and other access roads.

== See also ==
- List of United States Air Force installations
- Maryland World War II Army Airfields
