= Chester Victor Clifton Jr. =

United States Army general

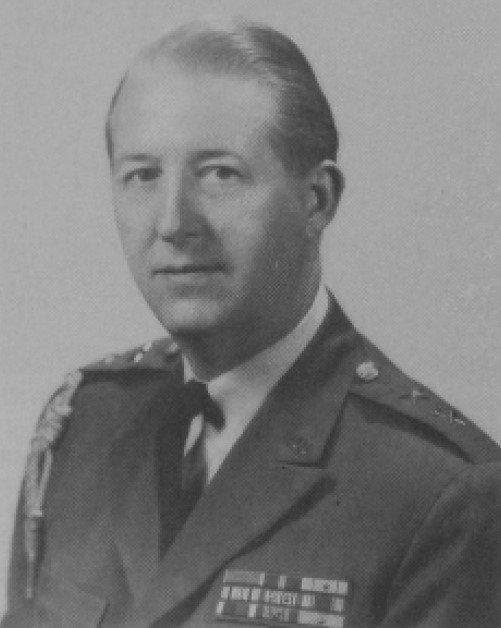
- Born: September 24, 1913; Edmonton, Alberta, Canada
- Died: December 23, 1991 (aged 78); Washington, D.C.
- Education: University of Washington; United States Military Academy (B.S.); University of Wisconsin–Madison School of Journalism & Mass Communication (M.A.); National War College
- Military career
- Allegiance: United States
- Branch: United States Army
- Service years: 1936–1965
- Rank: Major General
- Conflicts: Second World War

Chester Victor Clifton Jr. (September 24, 1913 – December 23, 1991) was a major general in the United States Army and an aide to Presidents John F. Kennedy and Lyndon B. Johnson.

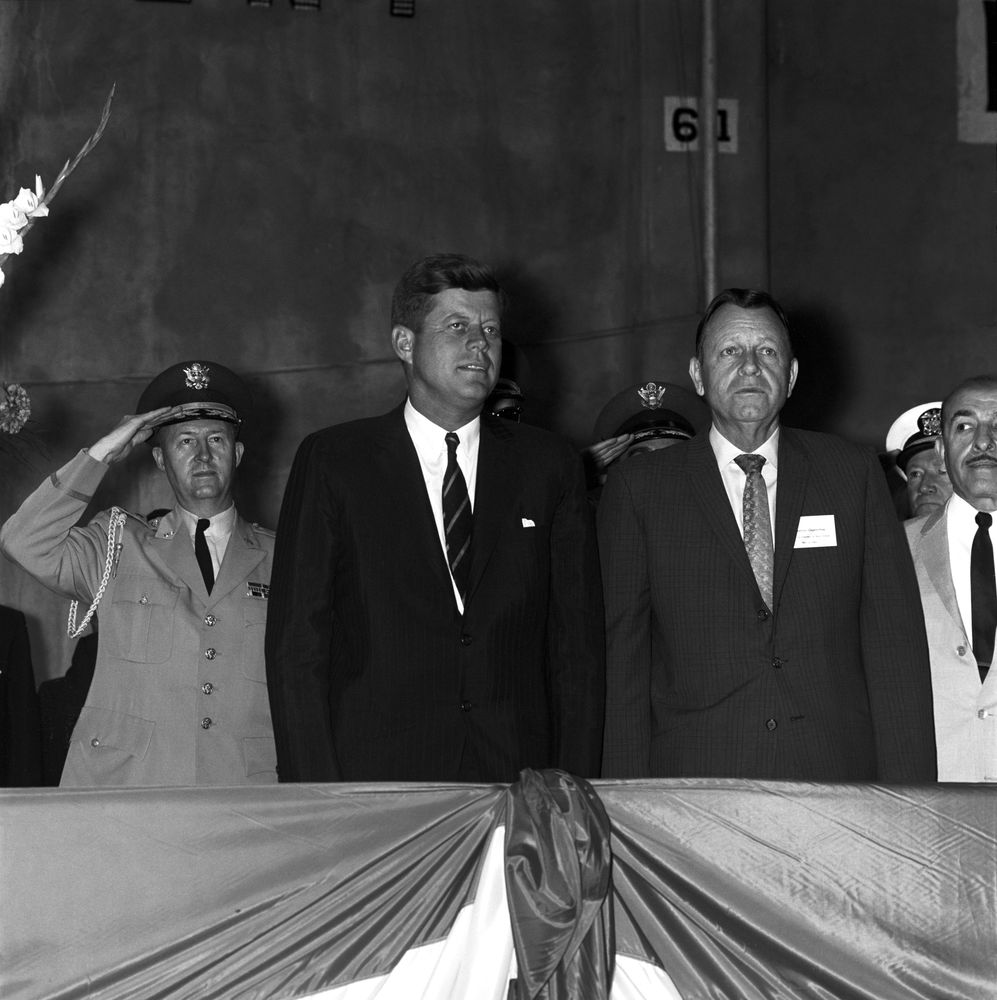
Clifton saluting at left, with President Kennedy, Louisiana Governor Jimmie Davis and New Orleans Mayor Vic Schiro, 1962

== Biography ==
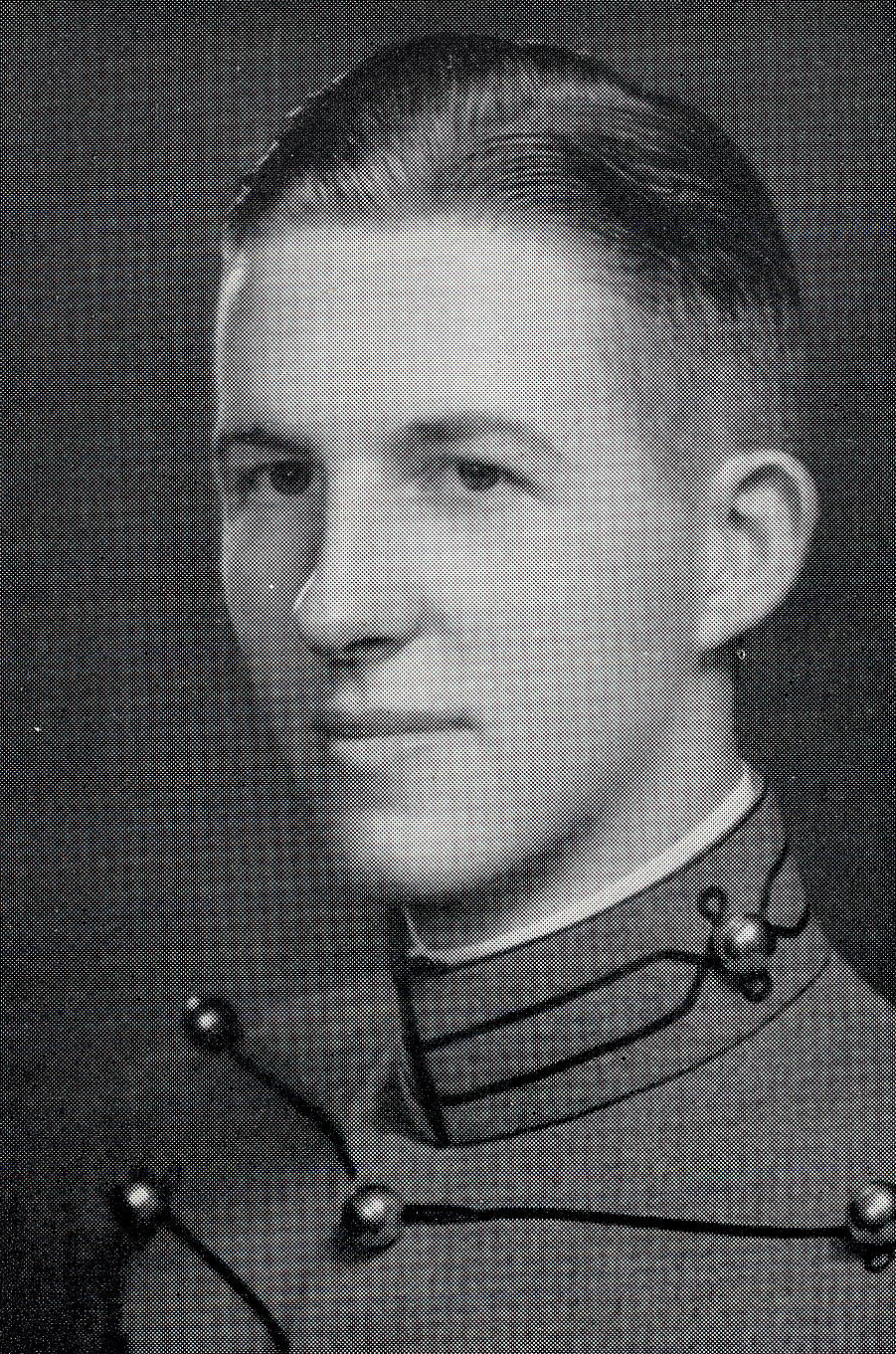
Clifton as a West Point cadet c. 1936

Clifton was born in Edmonton, Alberta, to American parents. They moved back to the United States, settling in Puyallup, Washington. He graduated from high school in 1930 and worked for the Seattle Post-Intelligencer as a cub reporter for two years while attending the University of Washington. He later graduated from the University of Wisconsin–Madison with an M.A. degree in journalism in June 1948. As a civilian he also worked as a reporter for the New York Herald Tribune and later worked in public relations and management. He co-authored the book The Memories: J.F.K., 1961–1963 with Cecil W. Stoughton and was a public relations consultant in the development of the John F. Kennedy Center for the Performing Arts.

Clifton died of pneumonia after an intestinal operation at the Walter Reed Army Medical Center in Washington, D.C., on December 23, 1991, and was survived by his widow, Anne Bodine (1915–2009). He and Anne are interred at Arlington National Cemetery.

== Career ==
Clifton entered the United States Military Academy in July 1932 and graduated with a B.S. degree in June 1936. During World War II he served in the Field Artillery in Italy, France and Germany, earning the Legion of Merit, a Bronze Star Medal, the French Croix de Guerre and the Italian Cross of Valor. Following the war Clifton was assigned to Army Headquarters to work on public relations and later became an assistant to Omar Bradley. In 1954, he graduated from the National War College. In 1956, he became Chief of Information of the Army.

Clifton joined the Kennedy administration in 1961 as senior military aide. In this position Clifton was responsible for Kennedy's daily intelligence briefings on world events. He was in the motorcade in Dallas, Texas, on November 22, 1963, when Kennedy was shot. Following the assassination, Clifton was in charge of dealing with military and national security affairs from the aftermath. He retained this position in the Johnson administration until his retirement from the Army in 1965. Clifton was awarded the Army Distinguished Service Medal for his accomplishments as a general officer from March 1957 to July 1965.

== Awards ==
- Army Distinguished Service Medal
- Legion of Merit
- Bronze Star Medal
- American Defense Service Medal
- American Campaign Medal
- European-African-Middle Eastern Campaign Medal
- World War II Victory Medal
- Army of Occupation Medal
- National Defense Service Medal
- Croix de Guerre (France)
- War Cross of Military Valor (Italy)
