= Seventy-Six Township, Iowa =

Seventy-Six Township, Iowa may refer to:

- Seventy-Six Township, Muscatine County, Iowa
- Seventy-Six Township, Washington County, Iowa
