= 76th Regiment =

76th Regiment may refer to:

- 76th Regiment of Foot (disambiguation), British Army units
- 76th Armoured Regiment, Indian Army
- 76th Communications Regiment, Ukrainian Air Force
- 76th Field Artillery Regiment, United States Army
- 76th Infantry Regiment "Napoli", Italian Army
- 76th Searchlight Regiment, Royal Artillery, British Army

== American Civil War regiments ==
- 76th Illinois Infantry Regiment
- 76th Indiana Infantry Regiment
- 76th New York Infantry Regiment
- 76th Ohio Infantry Regiment
- 76th Pennsylvania Infantry Regiment

== See also ==
- 76th Brigade (disambiguation)
- 76th Division (disambiguation)
- 76 Squadron (disambiguation)
