= AD 76 =

AD 76 in various calendars
- Gregorian calendar: AD 76; LXXVI
- Ab urbe condita: 829
- Assyrian calendar: 4826
- Balinese saka calendar: N/A
- Bengali calendar: −518 – −517
- Berber calendar: 1026
- Buddhist calendar: 620
- Burmese calendar: −562
- Byzantine calendar: 5584–5585
- Chinese calendar: 乙亥年 (Wood Pig); 2773 or 2566 — to — 丙子年 (Fire Rat); 2774 or 2567
- Coptic calendar: −208 – −207
- Discordian calendar: 1242
- Ethiopian calendar: 68–69
- Hebrew calendar: 3836–3837
- Hindu calendars
- Vikram Samvat: 132–133
- Shaka Samvat: N/A
- Kali Yuga: 3176–3177
- Holocene calendar: 10076
- Iranian calendar: 546 BP – 545 BP
- Islamic calendar: 563 BH – 562 BH
- Javanese calendar: N/A
- Julian calendar: AD 76; LXXVI
- Korean calendar: 2409
- Minguo calendar: 1836 before ROC 民前1836年
- Nanakshahi calendar: −1392
- Seleucid era: 387/388 AG
- Thai solar calendar: 618–619
- Tibetan calendar: ཤིང་མོ་ཕག་ལོ་ (female Wood-Boar); 202 or −179 or −951 — to — མེ་ཕོ་བྱི་བ་ལོ་ (male Fire-Rat); 203 or −178 or −950

AD 76 (LXXVI) was a leap year starting on Monday of the Julian calendar. At the time, it was known as the Year of the Consulship of Titus and Vespasianus (or, less frequently, year 829 Ab urbe condita). The denomination AD 76 for this year has been used since the early medieval period, when the Anno Domini calendar era became the prevalent method in Europe for naming years.

== Events ==
=== By place ===
==== Roman Empire ====
- Emperors Vespasianus Augustus and Titus Caesar Vespasianus become Roman Consuls.
- Governor Sextus Julius Frontinus subdues the Silures and other hostile tribes of Wales, establishing a fortress at Caerleon or Isca Augusta for Legio II Augusta, and makes a network of smaller forts for his auxiliary forces.

==== China ====
- First year of Jianchu era of the Chinese Han dynasty. ^{(Clarification needed as to the meaning of this)}

=== By topic ===
==== Art and Science ====
- Chinese historian Ban Gu develops a theory of the origins of the universe.

==== Religion ====
- Pope Anacletus I succeeds Pope Linus as the third pope of the Catholic Church (according to the official Vatican list).

== Births ==
- January 24 – Hadrian, Roman emperor (d. 138)

== Deaths ==
- Linus, pope of the Catholic Church (approximate date)
- Marcus Vettius Bolanus, Roman politician and governor (b. 33 AD)
- Nicanor the Deacon, Greek missionary and martyr
- Quintus Asconius Pedianus, Roman historian (b. 9 BC)
