= 76th Space Control Squadron =

- Active: 2008-present
- Country: United States
- Branch: United States Air Force
- Role: Space Control
- Part of: Air Force Space Command
- Garrison/HQ: Peterson Air Force Base, Colorado
- Nickname: Lobos
- Decorations: Air Force Outstanding Unit Award

Insignia
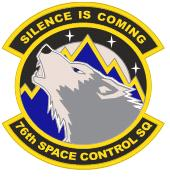
- 76th Space Control Squadron emblem

The United States Air Force's 76th Space Control Squadron is an offensive counter space unit located at Peterson Air Force Base, Colorado. The Squadron replaced the original 76th Space Control squadron in 2008 when that squadron returned to its historic role as a fighter unit.

== Mission ==
The 76th Space Control Squadron is an Air Force Space Command unit responsible for delivering offensive counterspace and space situational awareness, as appropriate, to rapidly achieve flexible and versatile effects in support of global and theater campaigns.

== History ==
In 2008 the Air Force decided to return the 76th Space Control Squadron to its traditional role as a fighter. To emphasize the continuity of the space mission, the Air Force decided to constitute a new unit with the same name and number. The new 76th Squadron continued the mission of operating the Counter Satellite Communications System, which had been deployed in 2004 as an offensive system to disrupt hostile satellite systems.

In February 2015 the unit was inactivated and personnel absorbed into its sister unit, the 4th Space Control Squadron.

== Lineage ==
- Constituted as the 76th Space Control Squadron on 16 November

Activated on 22 January 2008

=== Assignments ===
- 21st Operations Group, 22 January 2008 – February 2015

== Locations ==
- Peterson Air Force Base, Colorado, 22 January 2008 – February 2015

=== Equipment Operated ===
- Counter Communications System (2008–2015)
