= 76th Airlift Division =

Inactive United States Air Force division-level command at Andrews AFB

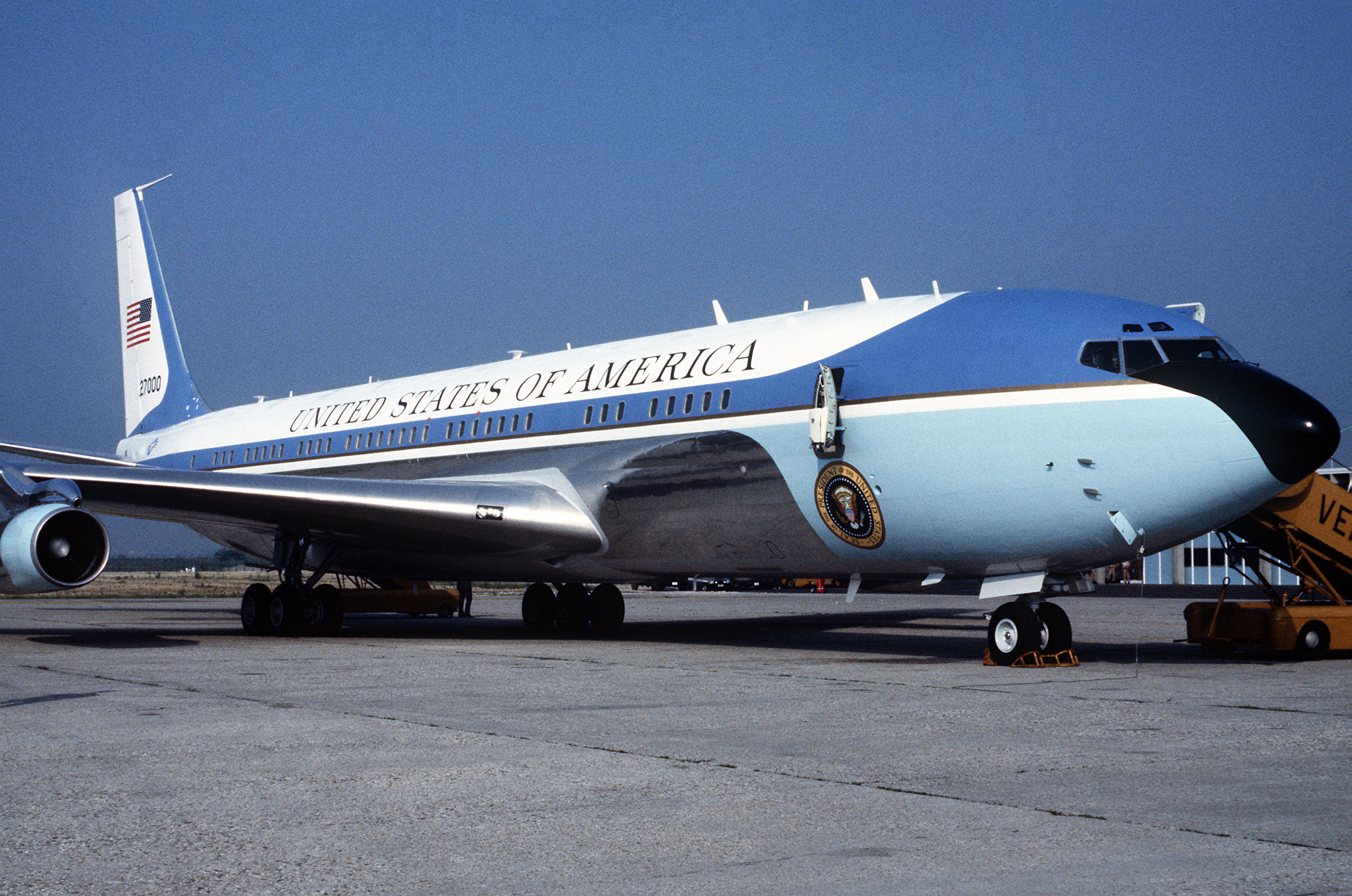
- VC-137 "Air Force One" of the division's 89th Military Airlift Wing
- Active: 1976–1977; 1980–1985
- Country: United States
- Branch: United States Air Force
- Type: Division
- Role: Command of special airlift forces
- Part of: Military Airlift Command; Twenty-First Air Force
- Garrison/HQ: Andrews Air Force Base, Maryland

Commanders
- Notable commanders: Brigadier General Archer L. Durham; Brigadier General Albert C. Guidotti; Brigadier General Paul A. Harvey

Insignia
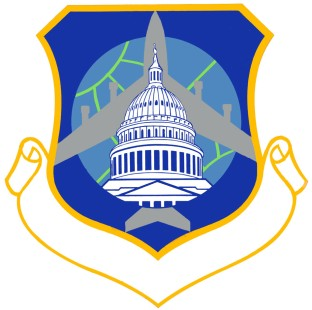
- 76th Airlift Division emblem (approved c. July 1976)

The 76th Airlift Division was a division of the United States Air Force, activated on 1 March 1976, inactivated on 30 September 1977, reactivated on 15 December 1980, and then inactivated again on 1 October 1985. Its principal subordinate units were the 89th Military Airlift Wing and the 1776th Air Base Wing. The division was formed as a restructuring of Headquarters Command, U.S. Air Force, and provided command oversight for presidential airlift, executive transport, and base support at Andrews Air Force Base, Maryland.

== Operations ==
From 1976 through 1977, and again after 1980, the 76th provided airlift support for the President, Vice President, cabinet members, and other high-ranking civilian and military dignitaries of the United States and other governments. Subordinate units operated, administered, and maintained Andrews Air Force Base and provided logistical support for the National Emergency Airborne Command Post (NEACP) and other flying units. One subordinate component, the 1st Helicopter Squadron, supported the United States Department of Defense, the Defense Preparedness Agency plan for emergency evacuation of key government officials, and the national search and rescue plan.

During its first activation (1976–1977), the 89th Military Airlift Wing served under the division. As part of the October 1977 reorganization that redesignated the division as the 76th Military Airlift Wing, the 89th was reduced in status to the 89th Military Airlift Group. On 15 December 1980, when the division was reactivated, the 89th Military Airlift Group was restored to wing status, and the 76th Air Base Group was redesignated the 1776th Air Base Wing.

== Lineage ==
- Established as the 76 Airlift Division on 17 February 1976

Activated on 1 March 1976
Inactivated on 30 September 1977
Activated on 15 December 1980
Inactivated on 1 October 1985

=== Assignments ===
- Twenty-First Air Force, 1 March 1976 – 30 September 1977
- Twenty-First Air Force, 15 December 1980 – 1 October 1985

=== Stations ===
- Andrews Air Force Base, Maryland, 1 March 1976 – 30 September 1977
- Andrews Air Force Base, Maryland, 15 December 1980 – 1 October 1985

=== Aircraft ===
- Beechcraft C-12 Huron, 1976–1977; 1980–1985
- Boeing C-135 Stratolifter, 1976–1977; 1980–1985
- Sikorsky CH-3, 1976–1977; 1980–1985
- North American T-39 Sabreliner, 1976–1977
- Bell UH-1 Iroquois, 1976–1977; 1980–1985
- Beechcraft VC-6 King Air, 1976–1977
- McDonnell Douglas VC-9 Skytrain II, 1976–1977; 1980–1985
- Convair VC-131, 1976–1977
- Boeing VC-135 Stratolifter, 1976–1977; 1980–1985
- Boeing VC-137 Stratoliner, 1976–1977; 1980–1985
- Lockheed VC-140 JetStar, 1976–1977; 1980–1985
- Beechcraft VC-6 Ute, 1980–1985
- C-20 Gulfstream III, 1983–1985

=== Commanders ===
- None (not crewed), 1 March 1976 – 30 June 1976
- Major General William C. Norris, 1 July 1976
- Major General Benjamin F. Starr Jr., 26 July 1977 – 30 September 1977
- Brigadier General Archer L. Durham, c. 15 December 1980
- Brigadier General Albert C. Guidotti, 1 February 1982
- Brigadier General Paul A. Harvey, 22 August 1984 – c. 1 October 1985

=== Emblem ===
Azure, a globe with axis bendwise celeste gridlined light green, surmounted in pale by a silhouetted aircraft ascending silver gray, overall coinciding with the edge of the globe in base, the US Capitol argent garnished of the first, all within a diminished bordure or. (Approved c. July 1976)

== See also ==
- List of United States Air Force air divisions
- 89th Airlift Wing
- Andrews Air Force Base
- Military Airlift Command
- 1605th Military Airlift Support Wing
- 436th Airlift Wing
