= 76th Brigade =

76th Brigade can refer to:

== Greece ==
- 76th Brigade (Greece)

== United Kingdom ==
- 76th Brigade (United Kingdom)
- 76th Anti-Aircraft Brigade (United Kingdom)
- 76th Brigade, Royal Field Artillery, British Army unit during World War I
- 76th (Highland) Brigade, Royal Field Artillery, British Army unit after World War I

== United States ==
- 76th Mobile Brigade Combat Team

== See also ==
- 76th Division (disambiguation)
- 76th Regiment (disambiguation)
- 76 Squadron (disambiguation)
