= 76th Reserve Division (German Empire) =

76th Reserve Division (76. Reserve-Division)
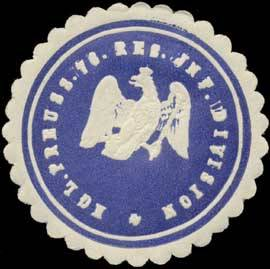
- Seal mark
- Active: December 1914 – 1919
- Country: German Empire
- Branch: Imperial German Army
- Type: Infantry
- Size: Approx. 12,500
- Engagements: World War I: Second Battle of the Masurian Lakes; Gorlice-Tarnów Offensive; Romanian campaign; Second Battle of the Marne; Aisne-Marne Offensive; Oise-Aisne Offensive; Meuse-Argonne Offensive

The 76th Reserve Division (76. Reserve-Division) was a unit of the Prussian Army, part of Imperial German Army in World War I. The division was formed at the end of December 1914 and organized over the next month, arriving in the line in early February 1915. It was part of the second large wave of new divisions formed at the outset of World War I, which were numbered the 75th through 82nd Reserve Divisions. The division was initially part of XXXVIII Reserve Corps. The division was disbanded in 1919 during the demobilization of the German Army after World War I. The division was primarily raised in the XVIII and XI Corps areas and was relatively mixed. The 254th Reserve Infantry Regiment was from the Grand Duchy of Hesse. The 253rd Reserve Infantry Regiment included troops from the Grand Duchy of Hesse and Hesse-Nassau. The 252nd Infantry Regiment was raised in the Thuringian states.

== Combat chronicle ==
The 76th Reserve Division initially fought on the Eastern Front. Its baptism of fire was in the Second Battle of the Masurian Lakes. It participated in several battles in the course of the Gorlice-Tarnów Offensive, including the siege of Kaunas, the battle of Nemunas, and the battle of Vilnius. From November 1915 to September 1916, the division remained in positional warfare by Riga. It was then transferred to Romania, where it fought until the armistice on the Romanian front. In March 1918, the division was transferred to the Western Front and went into the line in Lorraine. It saw action in the Second Battle of the Marne and resisted the Allies' Aisne-Marne, Oise-Aisne and Meuse-Argonne Offensives. Allied intelligence rated the division as third class.

== Order of battle on formation ==
The 76th Reserve Division, like the other divisions of its wave and unlike earlier German divisions, was organized from the outset as a triangular division. The order of battle of the 76th Reserve Division on December 29, 1914, was as follows:

- 76.Reserve-Infanterie-Brigade
  - Reserve-Infanterie-Regiment Nr. 252
  - Reserve-Infanterie-Regiment Nr. 253
  - Reserve-Infanterie-Regiment Nr. 254
  - Reserve-Radfahrer-Kompanie Nr. 76
- Reserve-Kavallerie-Abteilung Nr. 76
- 76.Reserve-Feldartillerie-Brigade
  - Reserve-Feldartillerie-Regiment Nr. 56
  - Reserve-Feldartillerie-Regiment Nr. 58
- Reserve-Pionier-Kompanie Nr. 76
- Reserve-Pionier-Kompanie Nr. 77

== Order of battle on January 1, 1918 ==
The most significant wartime structural change in the divisions of this wave was the reduction from two field artillery regiments to one. Over the course of the war, other changes took place, including the formation of artillery and signals commands and the enlargement of combat engineer support to a full pioneer battalion. The order of battle on January 1, 1918, was as follows:

- 76.Reserve-Infanterie-Brigade
  - Reserve-Infanterie-Regiment Nr. 252
  - Reserve-Infanterie-Regiment Nr. 253
  - Reserve-Infanterie-Regiment Nr. 254
  - Maschinengewehr-Scharfschützen-Abteilung Nr. 59
  - Reserve-Radfahrer-Abteilung Nr. 76
- 3.Eskadron/Reserve-Ulanen-Regiment Nr. 1
- Artillerie-Kommandeur 76
  - Reserve-Feldartillerie-Regiment Nr. 76
  - II.Bataillon/Fußartillerie-Regiment Nr. 24 (from April 15, 1918)
- Pionier-Bataillon Nr. 376:
  - Reserve-Pionier-Kompanie Nr. 76
  - Reserve-Pionier-Kompanie Nr. 77
  - Minenwerfer-Kompanie Nr. 276
- Divisions-Nachrichten-Kommandeur 476
