= 76th Air Division =

76th Airlift Division
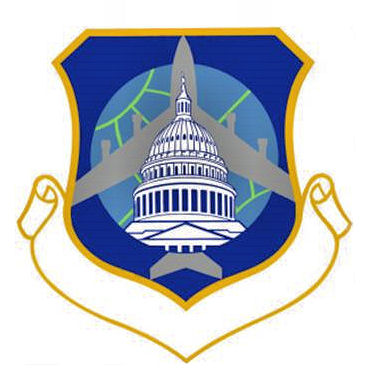
- Emblem of the 76th Airlift Division
- Active: 1976–1985
- Country: United States
- Branch: United States Air Force
- Role: Command and Control
- Part of: Military Airlift Command

The 76th Airlift Division (76th AD) is an inactive United States Air Force organization. Its last assignment was with Military Airlift Command, assigned to Twenty-First Air Force, being stationed at Andrews Air Force Base, Maryland. It was inactivated on 1 October 1985.

== History ==
=== Lineage ===
- Established as 76 Air Division on 17 February 1976

Activated on 1 March 1976
Inactivated on 30 September 1977

- Activated on 15 December 1980

Inactivated on 1 October 1985.

=== Assignments ===
- Military Airlift Command

Twenty-First Air Force, 1 March 1976 – 30 September 1977
Twenty-First Air Force, 15 December 1980 – 1 October 1985.

=== Stations ===
- Andrews AFB, Maryland, 1 March 1976 – 30 September 1977; 15 December 1980 – 1 October 1985.

=== Components ===
- 89th Military Airlift Wing: 1 July 1976 – 30 September 1977; 15 December 1980 – 1 October 1985.

=== Operational history ===
In 1976, 1977, and after 1980, the 76th provided airlift support for the President, Vice President, cabinet members, and other high-ranking civilian and military dignitaries of the United States and other governments. Subordinate units also operated, administered, and maintained Andrews AFB, Maryland, while providing logistical support for the National Emergency Airborne Command Post (NEACP) and other flying units. One component, the 1st Helicopter Squadron, supported the Department of Defense (DOD) and the Defense Preparedness Agency plan for the emergency evacuation of key government officials and the national search and rescue plan.

== See also ==
- List of United States Air Force air divisions
