= 11th Wing =

Active wing of the United States Air Force

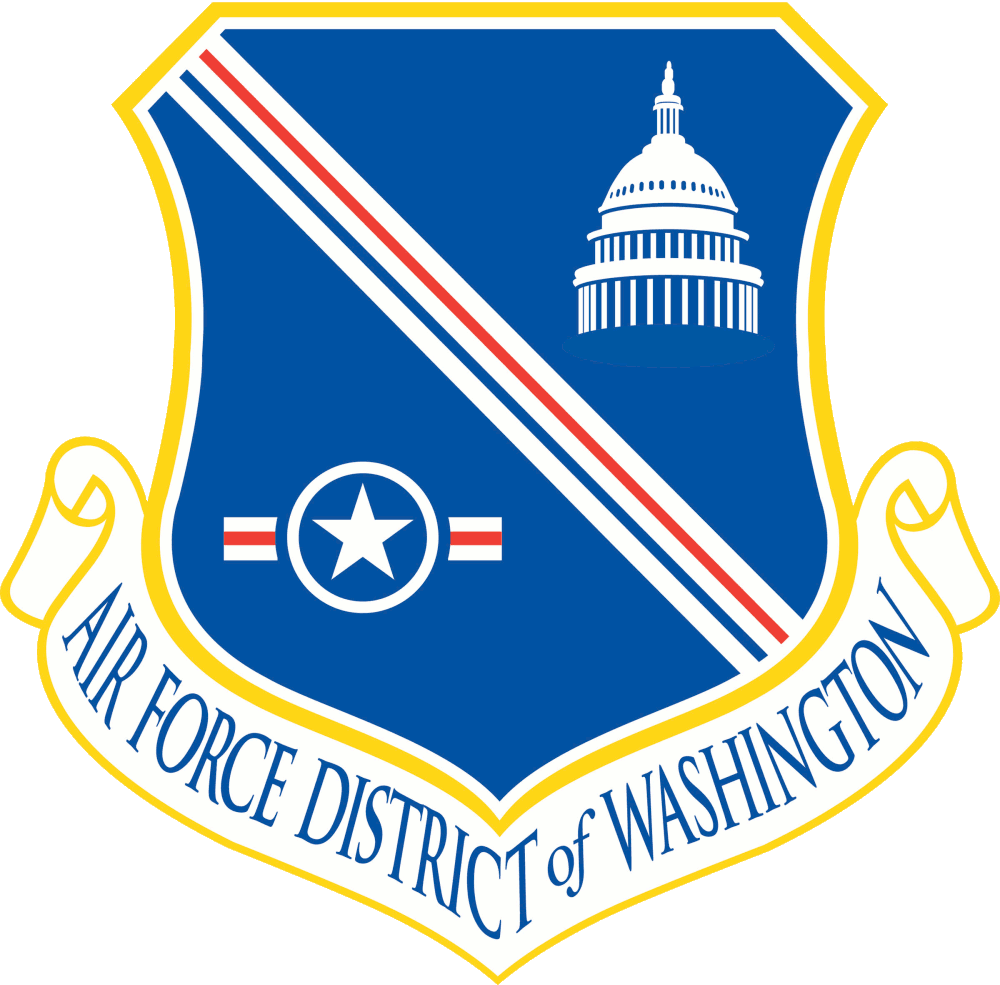
11th Wing

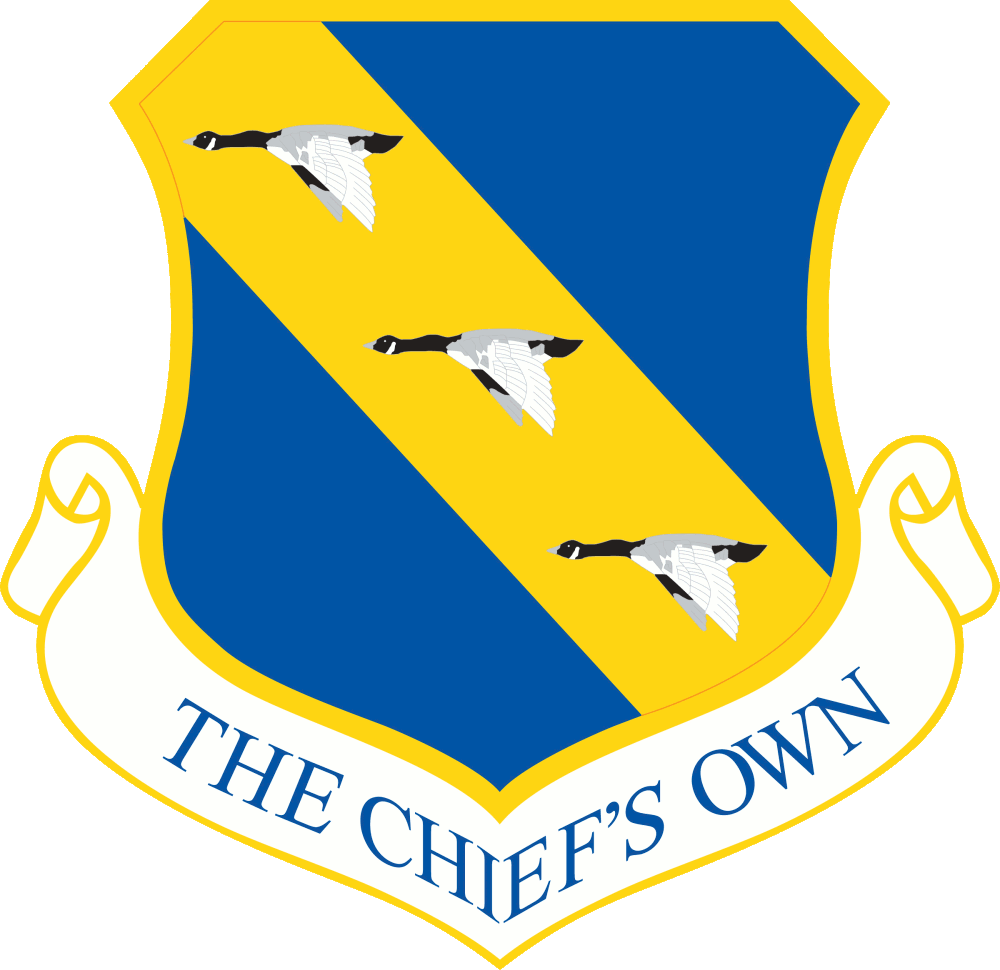
- Wing emblem
- Active: 1940–1948; 1948–1952; 1978 – present
- Country: United States
- Branch: United States Air Force
- Type: Air base wing
- Role: Base support
- Part of: Air Force District of Washington
- Base: Joint Base Anacostia–Bolling
- Nicknames: Grey Geese (World War II); The Chief's Own (1995–2020)
- Motto: Progresso sine Timore aut Praejudicio (Latin for 'Progress without Fear or Prejudice') (Note: This motto was replaced by the nickname in July 1995. Robertson, Factsheet 11 Wing)
- Decorations: Air Force Outstanding Unit Award; Distinguished Unit Citation; Organizational Excellence Award; Navy Presidential Unit Citation
- Website: Official website

Commanders
- Current commander: Colonel Ryan A. F. Crowley
- Deputy Commander: Colonel James A. Hudnell
- Command Chief Master Sergeant: Command Chief Master Sergeant Anthony Thompson Jr

The 11th Wing is a United States Air Force unit assigned to the Air Force District of Washington. It is the host unit at Joint Base Anacostia-Bolling in Washington, D.C., on from June 2020. It previously was stationed at Joint Base Andrews, Maryland where it was the host unit. The 11th Wing was one of the largest wings in the Air Force. It is known as "The Chief's Own", a motto that reflects its previous status as a Direct Reporting Unit.

The 11th Wing traces its roots back to the 11th Observation Group which was established on 1 October 1933, but not activated. The group was redesignated as the 11th Bombardment Group (Medium) on 1 January 1938, although not activated until 1 February 1940. Later that year it became a heavy bombardment unit. The group fought in combat in the Pacific Theater of Operations with Boeing B-17 Flying Fortresses and Consolidated B-24 Liberators. The 11th Bombardment Group earned a Navy Presidential Unit Citation for its actions in the South Pacific from 31 July to 30 November 1942. It participated in the Central Pacific; Air Offensive, Japan; Guadalcanal; Northern Solomons; Eastern Mandates; Western Pacific; Ryukyus and the China Offensive before its inactivation in 1948.

In 1978 the group was reactivated as the 11th Strategic Group, managing forward deployed Strategic Air Command (SAC) aircraft at RAF Fairford, England until 1990.

The 11th Bombardment Wing served with Strategic Air Command (SAC) during the Cold War, flying Convair B-36 Peacemakers, Boeing B-52 Stratofortresses Boeing KC-97 Stratofreighters and Boeing KC-135 Stratotankers. It also had SM-65 Atlas missiles assigned during the early 1960s. In 1968 the wing became the 11th Air Refueling Wing, retaining only its tankers until it was inactivated in 1969. In 1982 the wing was consolidated with the 11th Strategic Group.

The consolidated unit has served in its current mission since 1994, first as the 11th Support Wing and then as the 11th Wing.

The commander of the 11th Wing is Colonel Ryan Crowley. Its Command Chief Master Sergeant is Chief Master Sergeant Christy L. Peterson.

== History ==
=== World War II ===
The 11th Wing was first constituted as the 11th Observation Group 1 October 1933, and redesignated as the 11 Bombardment Group (Medium) on 1 January 1938, but was not activated until 1 February 1940. In November, it became a heavy bombardment group, acquiring its first 21 B-17 Flying Fortress in May 1941. Nine were sent to the Philippines in September 1941 and many of the remainder were destroyed in the attack on Pearl Harbor on 7 December 1941.

The 11th Bombardment Group was assigned to the Seventh Air Force in February 1942 and trained with the B-18 Bolo. Its aircraft flew patrols and search missions off Hawaii after the Japanese attack.

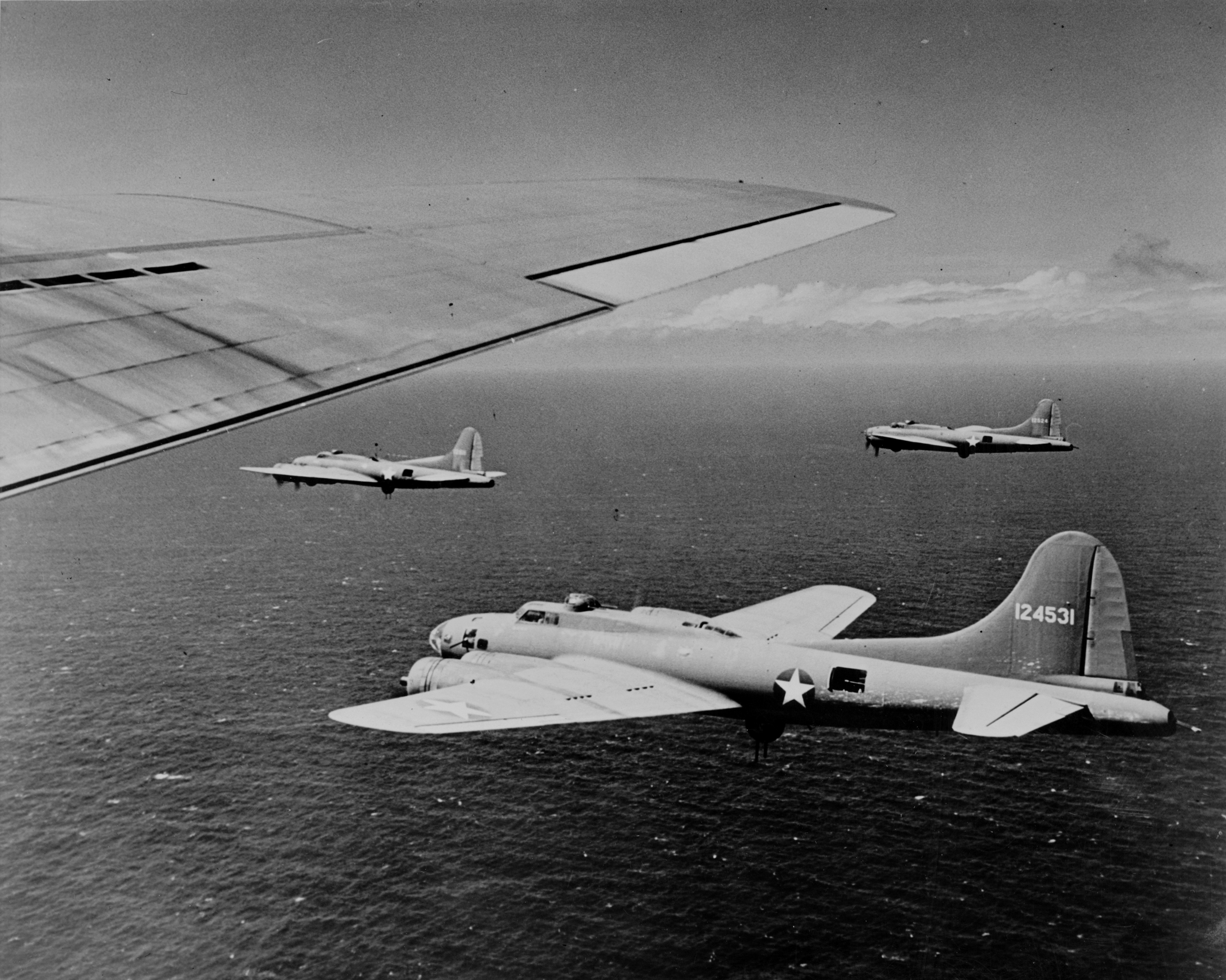
B-17Fs of the 26th BS, 11th BG, over the South Pacific, 1942.

The group, now fully equipped with new B-17s, moved to the Pekoa Airfield, Espiritu Santo, New Hebrides in July 1942 and became part of Thirteenth Air Force. From July to November 1942 it struck airfields, supply dumps, ships, docks, troop positions, and other objectives in the South Pacific, and received a Distinguished Unit Citation for those operations. It continued to attack Japanese airfields, installations, and shipping in the Solomon Islands, until late in March 1943.

The group returned to Hawaii where it was again assigned to Seventh Air Force and trained with B-24 Liberators. Combat operations resumed in November 1943 with the participation in the Allied offensive through the Gilberts, Marshalls, and Marianas, while operating from Funafuti, Tarawa, and Kwajalein. In October 1944 the Group moved to Guam and attacked shipping and airfields in the Volcano and Bonin Islands. In July 1945 the 11th BG moved to Okinawa to take part in the final phases of the air offensive against Japan, bombing railways, airfields, and harbor facilities on Kyushu and striking airfields in China.

After the war, the unit flew reconnaissance and surveillance missions over China. Its aircraft also ferried liberated prisoners of war from Okinawa to Luzon. The Group remained in the theater as part of Far East Air Forces but had no personnel assigned after mid-December 1945 when the group was transferred to the Philippines.

The group was redesignated 11th Bombardment Group, Very Heavy in April 1946 and transferred to Guam in May 1946, remanned, and equipped with the B-29 Superfortress. Training and operations were terminated in October 1946 and the group inactivated on 20 October 1948.

=== Strategic Air Command ===
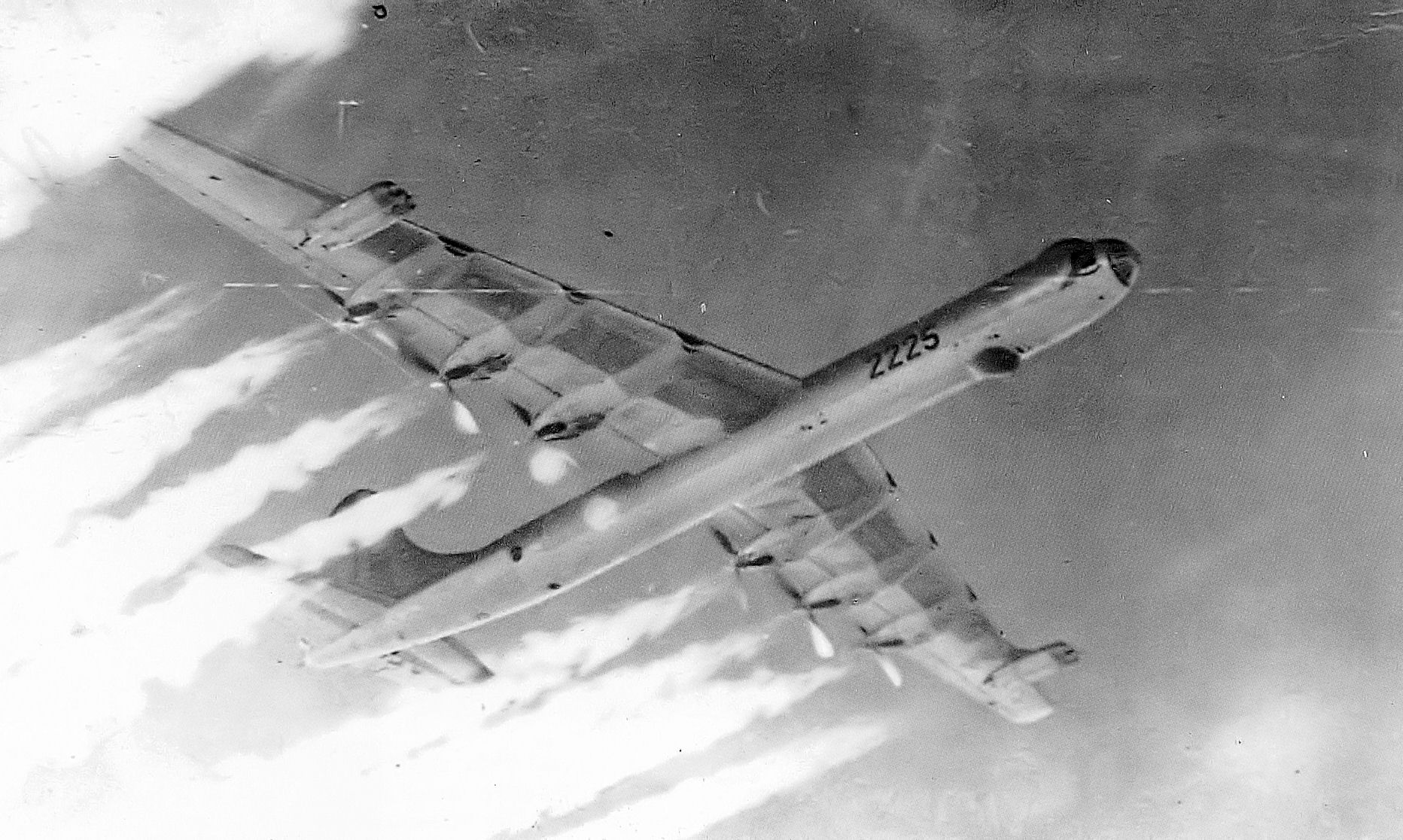
11th Bombardment Wing Convair B-36J-5-CF Peacemaker 52-2225 showing "Six turnin', four burnin", 1955

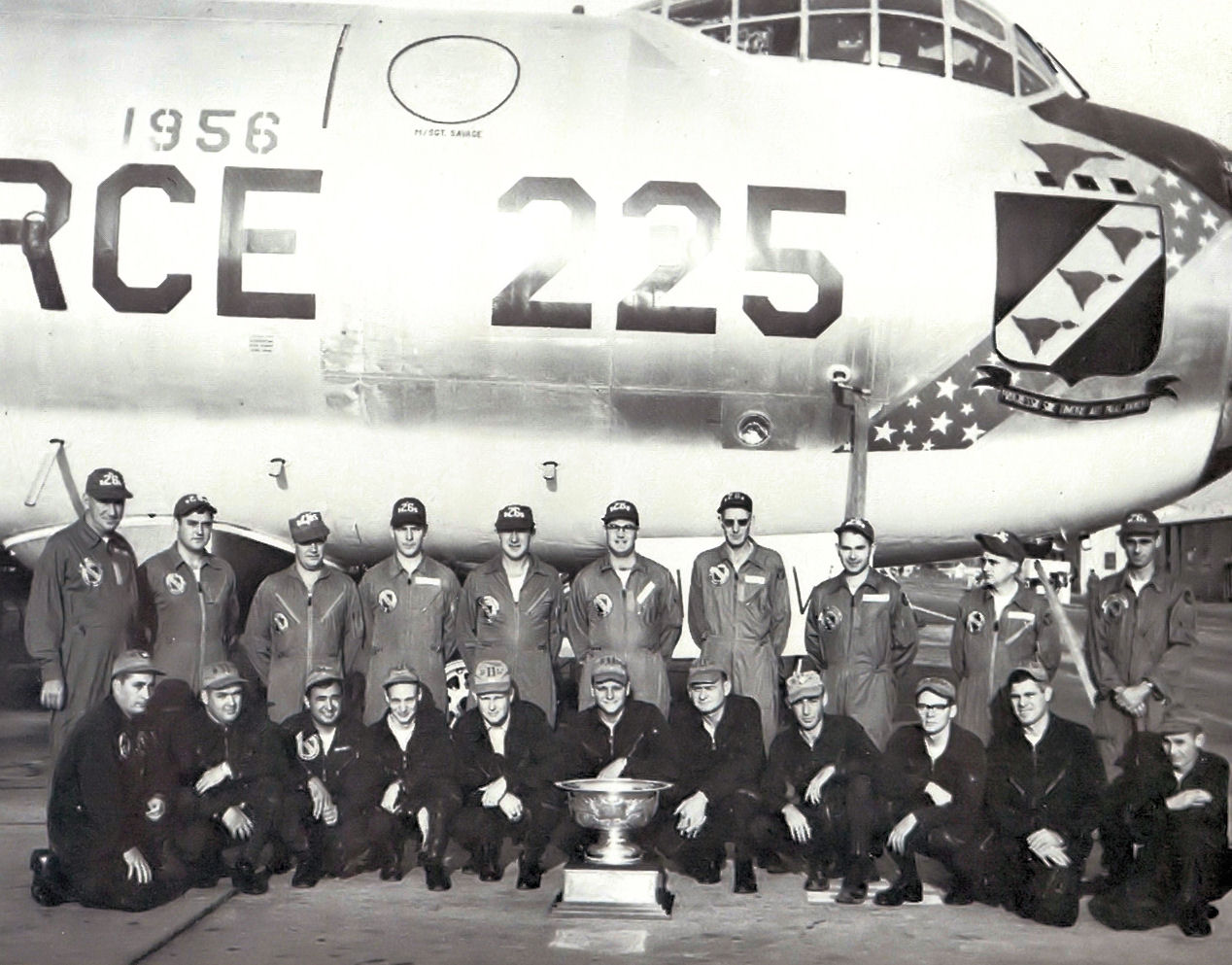
1956 SAC Fairchild Trophy Winner, "Best Bomb Wing in SAC", 11th Bombardment Wing crew in front of Convair B-36J

On 1 December 1948 the 11th Bomb Group was reactivated at Carswell Air Force Base. Texas and assigned to Eighth Air Force, but attached to the 7th Bombardment Wing. Carswell shared flight line facilities with the Convair Aircraft Company. The 7th was the first wing to receive the Convair B-36 Peacemaker. 11th Bomb Group B-36s appeared in the movie "Strategic Air Command" with James Stewart who was also attached to the unit in the 1950s as a reserve commander. The 7th wing's personnel began training the new 11th group people in the new B-36 and the 11th soon began receiving them.

On 16 February 1951 the 11th Bombardment Wing was activated and the group was assigned to it, although all group resources were transferred to the wing until the group was inactivated in June 1952. In December 1951, six wing B-36s flew nonstop from Carswell to Sidi Slimane Air Base, Morocco in the first flight of B-36 aircraft to Africa.

By September 1952, the B-36s assigned to the 11th Wing and its companion at Carswell, the 7th Bombardment Wing, comprised two-thirds of SAC's intercontinental bomber force.

On 1 September 1952, what was then thought to be a tornado rolled across the Carswell flight line, with winds over 90 miles per hour recorded at the control tower. By the time it had passed "the flight line was a tangle of airplanes, equipment and pieces of buildings." None of the 82 bombers on the base escaped damage, and SAC declared the entire 19th Air Division non-operational. Maintenance personnel of the 11th Wing went on an 84-hour weekly work schedule and began work to restore the least damaged aircraft to operational status. More heavily damaged aircraft were worked on by personnel from the San Antonio Air Materiel Area, where the depot for the B-36 was located. The planes that had been most heavily damaged were towed across the field to the Convair plant where they had been manufactured. Within a month, 51 of the base's Peacemakers had been returned to service and the wing was again declared operational. By May 1953, all but two of the planes had been returned to service. (Note: One plane was written off, another was bailed to Convair to be used for experiments with nuclear power. McGowan, p. 65.)

The wing deployed to Nouasseur Air Base, French Morocco from 4 May until 2 July 1955. The Wing won the SAC Bombing Competition and the Fairchild Trophy in 1954, 1956 and 1960. 7–11 must have been considered a lucky combination, because the two wings continued to share Carswell Air Force Base until 13 December 1957, when the 11th moved to Altus Air Force Base, Oklahoma and began receiving B-52 Stratofortresses. The wing added air refueling to its mission in December 1957. Its 96th Air Refueling Squadron flew KC-97 Stratofreighters during 1957 and 1958. The Wing gained the 1100th Wing Detachment, (HQ USAF) in 1957 at Bolling AFB Washington DC the same year.

The Wing gained the 577th Strategic Missile Squadron on 1 June 1961 and on 1 April 1962 its new Atlas missiles became fully operational. To reflect that its mission included both aircraft and missiles, the wing was redesigned the 11th Strategic Aerospace Wing. The wing phased out its Atlas missiles in January 1965.

The wing also flew KC-135 jet tankers. The 918th and 921st Air Refueling Squadrons were assigned to the wing from October to December 1960. The central location of Altus AFB led to the expansion of the wing's refueling capability. On 25 June 1965 the 11th Air Refueling Squadron was assigned to the wing. In 1968, the wing began phasing out its B-52s. This was completed by mid year. On 2 July 1968, the wing was redesignated the 11th Air Refueling Wing. The wing's new designation was short lived, for it was inactivated on 25 March 1969.

On 15 November 1978 the 11th Bombardment Group was reactivated as the 11th Strategic Group at RAF Fairford, England. It was not manned until the following February and did not start receiving aircraft until September 1978. It soon began air refueling support for all USAF operations, deployments and redeployments, as well as participating in NATO exercises.

Operations staff and maintenance personnel were permanently assigned, but aircraft, aircrews and crew chiefs were assigned on a temporary duty basis to the 11th Strategic Group for the European Tanker Task Force on a rotational basis. Aircraft and crews operated out of Riyadh, Saudi Arabia; Keflavik, Iceland; Zaragosa, Spain; Lajes Field, Azores; Sigonella NAS, Italy; and Hellenikon, Greece. In 1982, the wing and group were consolidated into a single unit, retaining the 11th Strategic Group designation. The group was inactivated on 7 August 1990.

=== From the 1990s ===
The 11th existed once again on paper as the 11th Support Wing on 2 June 1994 and fully activated on 15 July 1994 as a Direct Reporting Unit (DRU) to the Vice Chief of Staff at Bolling Air Force Base, Washington, DC. The 11th Wing's new mission consisted of serving as the single manager for all Air Force activities supporting Headquarters Air Force and other Air Force units in the National Capital Region and at geographically separated units worldwide. As a mark of its service rather than a function, the 11th Wing's motto changed, with the approval of General Ronald Fogleman, to "The Chief's Own" on 6 February 1996. Within hours of the 11 September attacks, Headquarters Air Force relocated to Bolling Air Force Base without any break in operations.

Just after a decade after its redesignation as the 11th Wing on 1 March 1995, the wing's worldwide support mission shifted to the Air Force District of Washington (AFDW) on 1 January 2005. The 11th Wing, through its recently activated 811th Force Support Squadron, continues to support AFDW's mission with its administrative management over approximately 40,000 Air Force military and civilian members in 250 locations.

In 2010, the 11th Wing relocated to Joint Base Andrews Maryland, where it took on the roles as host unit for the installation and the parent organization of the 1st Helicopter Squadron.

In the late 2010s the Wing's units include the 11th Comptroller Squadron, 11th Mission Support Group, 11th Operations Group with The United States Air Force Band, the United States Air Force Honor Guard, and Arlington Chaplaincy; the 811th Operations Group with the 1st Helicopter Squadron and 811th Operations Support Squadron; the 11th Security Forces Group with the 11th Security Forces Squadron, the 811th Security Forces Squadron, and the 11th Security Forces Support Squadron; and the 11th Medical Group, the former 79th Medical Wing's personnel, equipment, and facilities which were merged into the 11th Wing in late 2017. The 11th Wing operated out of several locations around the National Capital Region, including Arlington National Cemetery, Bolling Air Force Base, and The Pentagon. The wing also provides United States Air Force ceremonial, music, protocol and funeral support for the region surrounding Joint Base Anacostia–Bolling.

In June 2020 the Air Force and the Navy reached an agreement to transfer responsibility for Joint Base Anacostia Bolling from the Navy to the Air Force, based on the predominance of Air Force "mission sets" on the station. In connection with this transfer, the 11th Wing returned to its former station and returned responsibility for Andrews to the 316th Wing.

== Lineage ==
11th Wing

- Constituted as the 11th Observation Group on 1 October 1933

Redesignated 11th Bombardment Group (Medium) on 1 January 1938
Activated on 1 February 1940
Redesignated 11th Bombardment Group (Heavy) on 1 December 1940
Redesignated 11th Bombardment Group, Heavy on 3 August 1944
Redesignated 11th Bombardment Group, Very Heavy on 30 April 1946
Inactivated on 20 October 1948

- Redesignated 11th Bombardment Group, Heavy and activated, on 1 December 1948

Inactivated on 16 June 1952

- Redesignated 11th Strategic Group on 25 October 1978

Activated on 15 November 1978

- Consolidated with the 11th Bombardment Wing on 31 March 1982

Inactivated on 7 August 1990

- Redesignated 11th Support Wing on 2 June 1994

Activated on 15 July 1994
Redesignated 11th Wing on 1 March 1995

11th Air Refueling Wing

- Constituted as the 11th Bombardment Wing, Heavy on 18 November 1948.

Activated on 16 February 1951
Redesignated 11th Strategic Aerospace Wing on 1 April 1962
Redesignated 11th Air Refueling Wing on 2 July 1968
Inactivated on 25 March 1969

- Consolidated with the 11th Strategic Group on 31 March 1982 as the 11th Strategic Group

=== Assignments ===
11th Group

- 18th (later, 18th Bombardment) Wing, 1 February 1940
- VII Bomber Command, 29 January 1942
- XIII Bomber Command, c. 5 January 1943
- VII Bomber Command, 8 April 1943
- Far East Air Forces, 23 November 1945
- Twentieth Air Force, 15 May 1946 – 20 October 1948
- Eighth Air Force, 1 December 1948 (attached to 7th Bombardment Wing), 1 December 1948 – 15 February 1951

11th Bombardment Wing, 16 February 1951 – 16 June 1952
7th Air Division, 15 November 1978 to consolidation

11th Wing

- Eighth Air Force

19th Air Division, 16 February 1951 (attached to 5th Air Division, 4 May – 2 July 1955)

- Second Air Force, 13 December 1957

816th Air (later, 816th Strategic Aerospace) Division, 1 July 1958
819th Strategic Aerospace Division, 1 July 1965
19th Air Division, 2 July 1966 – 25 March 1969

Consolidated Unit

7th Air Division, from consolidation in 1982 – 7 August 1990

- Air Force District of Washington, 7 July 2005 – present

=== Components ===
11th Group

Squadrons
14th Bombardment Squadron: 1 February 1940 – 2 December 1941 (detached c. 16 September – 2 December 1941)
26th Bombardment Squadron: 1 February 1940 – 20 October 1948; 1 December 1948 – 16 June 1952 (detached 16 February 1951 – 16 June 1952)
42d Bombardment Squadron: 1 February 1940 – 20 October 1948; 1 December 1948 – 16 June 1952 (detached 16 February 1951 – 16 June 1952)
50th Reconnaissance (later, 431st Bombardment): attached 1 February 1940 – 24 February 1942

Assigned 25 February 1942 – 29 April 1946

98th Bombardment Squadron: 16 December 1941 – 20 October 1948; 1 December 1948 – 16 June 1952 (detached 16 February 1951 – 16 June 1952)
373d Bombardment Squadron: 11 October 1945 – 7 January 1946

11th Wing

Group
11th Bombardment Group: 16 February 1951 – 16 June 1952

Squadrons
11th Air Refueling Squadron: 25 June 1965 – 25 March 1969
26th Bombardment Squadron: attached 16 February 1951 – 15 June 1952, assigned 16 June 1952 – 2 July 1968
42d Bombardment Squadron: attached 16 February 1951 – 15 June 1952, assigned 16 June 1952 – 1 June 1960
96th Air Refueling Squadron: 3 December 1957 – 1 October 1960; 15 December 1960 – 25 June 1965
98th Bombardment Squadron: attached 16 February 1951 – 15 June 1952, assigned 16 June 1952 – 10 December 1957
577th Strategic Missile Squadron: 1 June 1961 – 25 March 1965
918th Air Refueling Squadron: 1 October – 15 December 1960
921st Air Refueling Squadron: 1 October – 15 December 1960.

Consolidated Unit

Squadrons
34th Strategic Squadron: 1 October 1986 – 7 August 1990
42d Strategic Squadron: 1 January 1989 – 7 August 1990.

=== Aircraft and Missiles ===
- B-18 Bolo, 1940–1942
- B-17 Flying Fortress, 1941–1943
- B-24 Liberator, 1943–1945
- B-29 Superfortress, 1946
- B-36 Peacemaker, 1949–1957
- U-3A Blue Canoe, 1958–1960
- KC-97 Stratofreighter, 1957–1958
- B-52 Stratofortress, 1958–1968
- KC-135 Stratotanker, 1958–1969; 1979–1990
- SM-65 Atlas, 1961–1965
- KC-10 Extender, 1984–1990

=== Stations ===
- Hickam Field, Territory of Hawaii, 1 February 1940
- Pekoa Airfield, Espiritu Santo, New Hebrides, 22 July 1942
- Hickam Field, Territory of Hawaii, 8 April 1943
- Funafuti Airfield, Nanumea, Gilbert Islands, 9 November 1943
- Tarawa, Gilbert Islands

Hawkins Field, 14–28 January 1944
Bairiki (Mullinix) Airfield, 28 January – 5 April 1944

- Kwajalein Airfield, Kwajalein, Marshall Islands, 5 April 1944
- Agana Airfield, Guam, Marianas Islands, 25 October 1944
- Okinawa, Ryukyu Islands, July 1945
- Fort William McKinley, Luzon, Philippine Islands, 11 December 1945
- Northwest AAB (later, Harmon Field), Guam, 15 May 1946 – 20 October 1948
- Carswell Air Force Base, Texas, 1 December 1948 - 13 December 1957
- Altus Air Force Base, Oklahoma, 13 December 1957 – 25 March 1969
- RAF Fairford, England, 15 November 1978 – 7 August 1990
- Bolling Air Force Base, District of Columbia, 15 July 1994
- Andrews Air Force Base, Maryland, 1 October 2010
- Joint Base Anacostia-Bolling, District of Columbia, 12 June 2020 – present

== See also ==
- List of B-52 Units of the United States Air Force
- List of wings of the United States Air Force
