= 811th Operations Group =

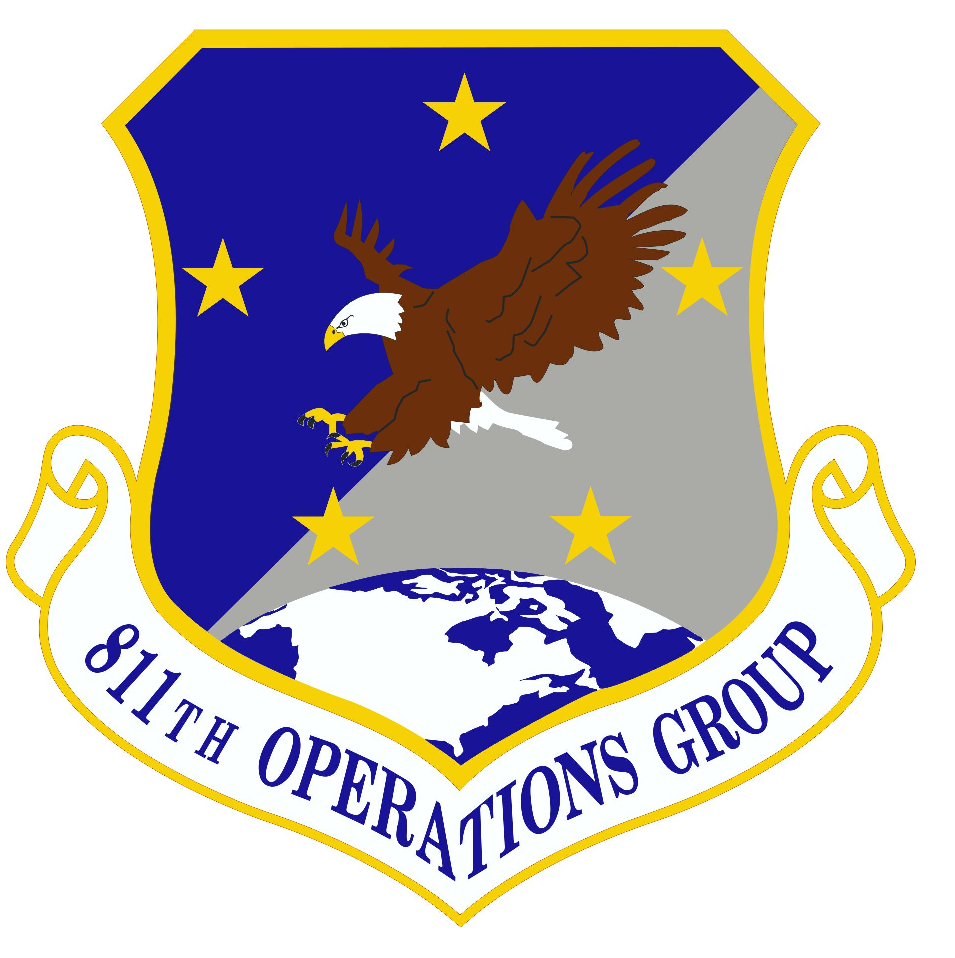
- Active: 2010-2020
- Country: United States of America
- Branch: United States Air Force
- Type: Operations Group
- Role: Helicopter Airlift
- Home Port: Joint Base Andrews
- Mascot(s): Eagle

Aircraft flown
- Patrol: UH-1N Iroquois

The 811th Operations Group was a group of the United States Air Force.

It provided rotary-wing contingency response support capability to the United States National Capital Region while also supporting regional and global customers with critical airfield infrastructure and aviation services. The group consisted of two squadrons of aircrew and support personnel. The group was assigned to the 11th Wing from 1 October 2010.

When the 11th Wing was transferred to Joint Base Anacostia–Bolling in 2020, the 811th Operations Group's functions were replaced by the 316th Operations Group.

== Units ==
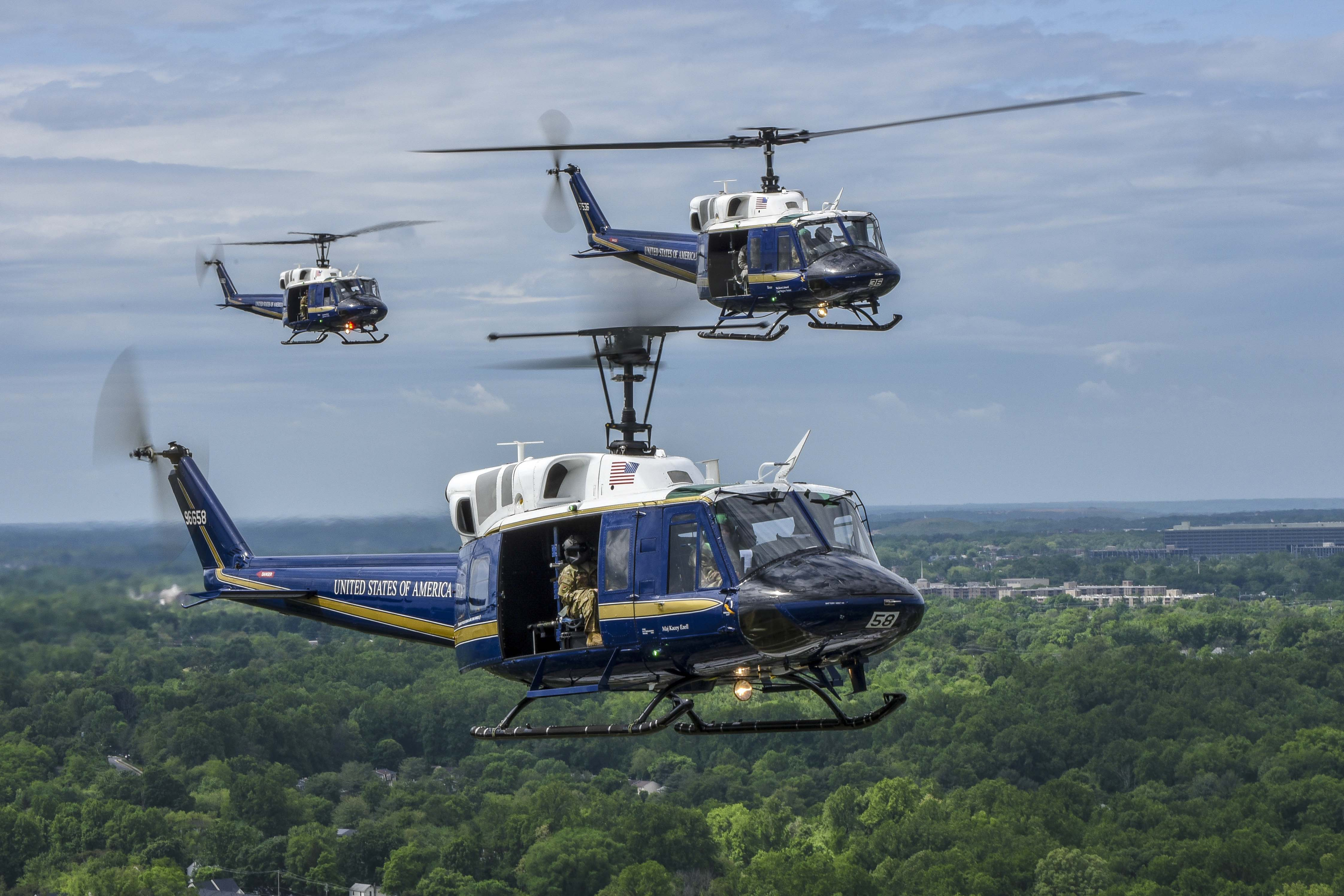
UH-1Ns Fly Over Joint Base Andrews, MD

- 811th Operations Support Squadron
- 1st Helicopter Squadron
