= 21st Reconnaissance Squadron (disambiguation) =

21st Reconnaissance Squadron may refer to:

- The 911th Air Refueling Squadron, designated the 21st Reconnaissance Squadron (Long Range) from December 1939 to November 1940 and the 21st Reconnaissance Squadron (Heavy) from November 1940 to April 1942.
- The 21st Expeditionary Reconnaissance Squadron, designated the 21st Reconnaissance Squadron (Bomber) from April 1943 to August 1943.
- The 921st Air Refueling Squadron, designated the 21st Reconnaissance Squadron, Photographic from October 1947 to June 1949.

== See also ==
- The 21st Photographic Reconnaissance Squadron
- The 21st Tactical Reconnaissance Squadron, active from August 1943 to May 1944.
