= 921st Expeditionary Air Refueling Squadron =

United States Air Force unit

921st Expeditionary Air Refueling Squadron

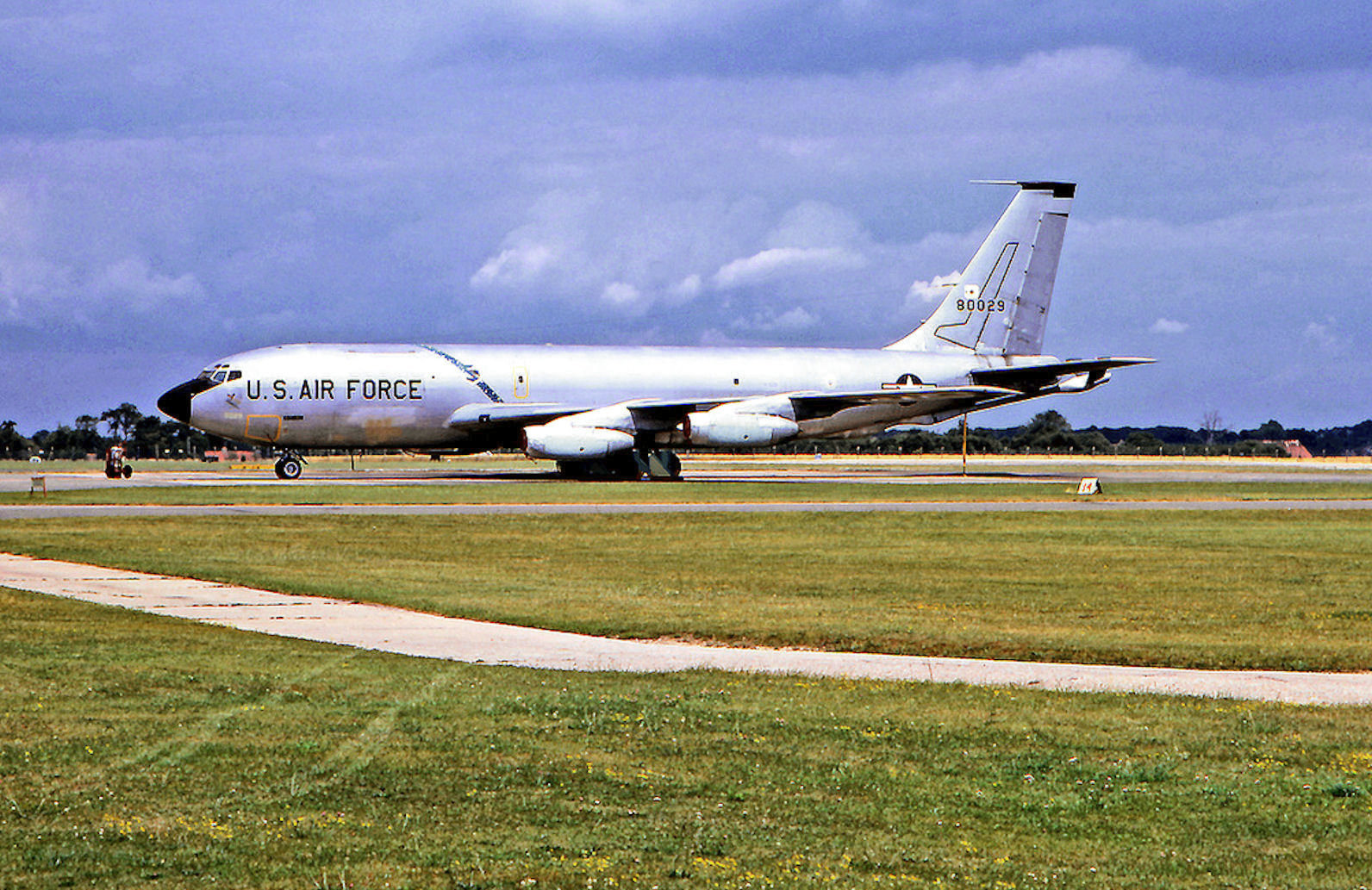
- KC-135A in SAC markings of the 1960s
- Active: 1942–1946; 1947–1949; 1960; unknown −2011
- Country: United States
- Branch: United States Air Force
- Role: Air refueling
- Part of: Air Mobility Command
- Engagements: China Burma India Theater

Insignia
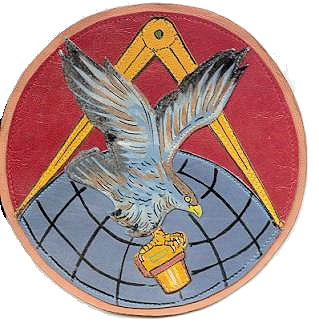
- 21st Photographic Reconnaissance Squadron emblem (Note: Approved 19 April 1944. Description: Over and through a dark red disc, a demisphere in base light gray, marked with lines of latitude and longitude dark gray, encompassed by a pair of gold dividers, all surmounted by a peregrine falcon in flight, grasping a gold aerial camera in the talons.)

The 921st Expeditionary Air Refueling Squadron is a provisional United States Air Force unit. Its last known active period ended on 12 November 2011 at Moron Air Base, Spain.

The squadron was first activated in 1942 as the 21st Photographic Reconnaissance Squadron in 1942 at Peterson Field, Colorado. It served in combat in the China Burma India Theater as part of the Fourteenth Air Force. After the war, the squadron served as the 21st Reconnaissance Squadron with the Air Force Reserve at Stewart Air Force Base, New York from 1947 until 1949, but does not appear to have been fully manned or equipped.

The 921st Air Refueling Squadron was activated in 1960 at Altus Air Force Base, Oklahoma to serve as an air refueling squadron for dispersed Boeing B-52 Stratofortresses. However, the decision to activate the squadron was reversed shortly thereafter and its personnel and equipment were returned to the squadron that had provided its cadre.

In September 1985, the 921st Air Refueling Squadron and the 21st Reconnaissance Squadron were consolidated into a single unit. The squadron was subsequently converted to provisional status and designated the 921st Expeditionary Air Refueling Squadron.

== History ==
=== World War II ===
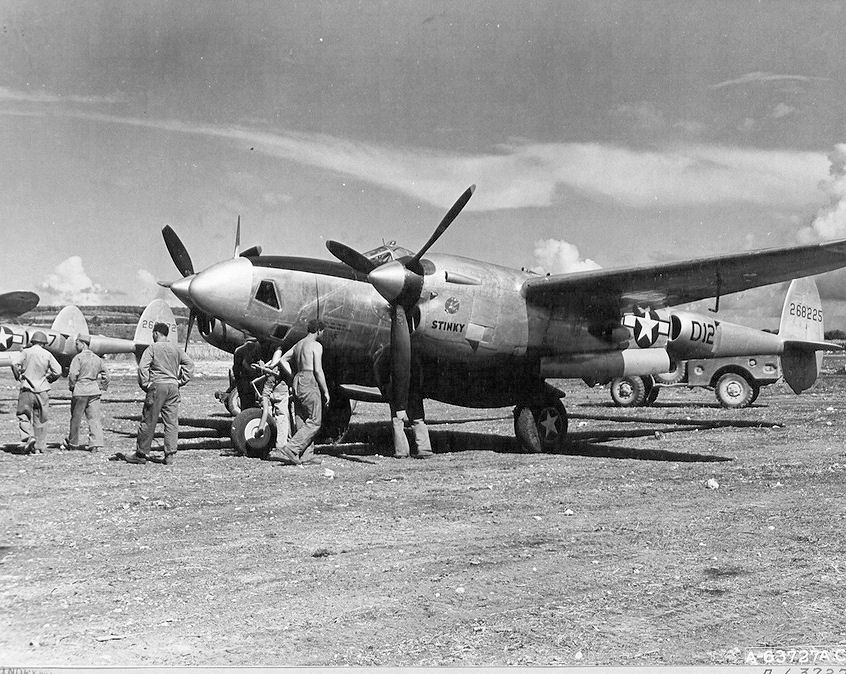
F-5 Lightning

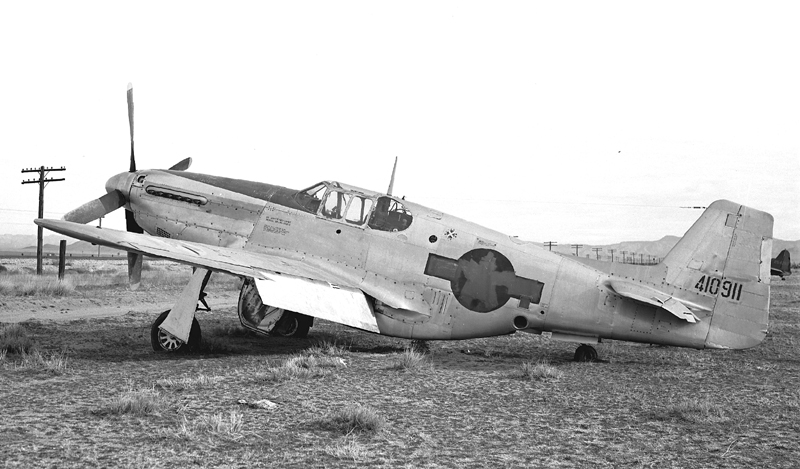
F-6 Mustang in post-war storage

The squadron was first activated as the 21st Photographic Reconnaissance Squadron in September 1942 at Peterson Field, Colorado, but apparently was not fully manned until December. It trained there until April 1943, when the squadron was reassigned from the 5th Photographic Group and began its overseas movement. The squadron arrived in India in June and began deploying flights to China the following month. It served as an umbrella organization for Fourteenth Air Force reconnaissance operations in China. The squadron deployed detached flights of reconnaissance aircraft, (mostly specially equipped Lockheed F-5 Lightnings] and North American F-4 and F-6 Mustangs), which flew combat reconnaissance missions over Japanese-held territory from numerous forward airstrips. Squadron detachments flew missions over India, Burma, Thailand, French Indochina, Hainan Island, Formosa, Shanghai, China, the Philippines, Japan and Korea. Flight A of the squadron also performed mapping missions over Thailand and Burma. The squadron redeployed from China at the end of 1945 and was inactivated at Fort Lawton, Washington, at the beginning of 1946.

=== Air Force reserve ===
The squadron was redesignated the 21st Reconnaissance Squadron and reactivated as a reserve unit under Air Defense Command (ADC) on 1 October 1947 at Stewart Air Force Base, New York. In 1948 Continental Air Command (ConAC) assumed responsibility for managing reserve and Air National Guard units from ADC. At Stewart, the squadron trained under ConAC's 2232d Air Force Reserve Training Center, but does not appear to have been fully equipped. President Truman’s reduced 1949 defense budget also required reductions in the number of units in the Air Force, and the 21st was inactivated in June 1949 and not replaced as reserve flying operations at Stewart ceased.

=== Strategic Air Command ===
The 921st Air Refueling Squadron was one of two air refueling squadrons activated in 1960 at Altus Air Force Base, Oklahoma for movement to other bases to provide Boeing KC-135 Stratotanker support to dispersed Boeing B-52 Stratofortress bombers. Cadre and aircraft for the squadron was drawn from the 96th Air Refueling Squadron, which was inactivated The decision to organize squadrons at Altus for movement elsewhere was reversed shortly after the 921st was organized, and the squadron was inactivated and its personnel and aircraft were returned to the 96th, which was reactivated.

The 921st Air Refueling Squadron and the 21st Reconnaissance Squadron were consolidated in September 1985. The consolidated squadron was redesignated the 921st Expeditionary Air Refueling Squadron and converted to provisional status.

=== Expeditionary operations ===
In 2011, the 921st Expeditionary Air Refueling Squadron was deployed in support of Operation Unified Protector, serving at Moron Air Base, Spain, until November 2011. The squadron was NATO's largest tanker squadron composed of active duty, Air National Guard and Air Force Reserve Command KC-135 and KC-10 aircrews. The squadron executed over 1,000 combat missions to enforce the United Nations No Fly Zone over Libya.

The AMC wing at Moron was the 313th Air Expeditionary Wing and it appears that the 921 EARS served under this wing. James B. Dermer served as squadron commander for a period in 2011 at Moron, who was then succeeded by Lt. Col. Phil Heseltine who was squadron commander from August to October 2011.

== Lineage ==
21st Reconnaissance Squadron

- Constituted as the 21st Photographic Reconnaissance Squadron on 14 July 1942

Activated on 2 September 1942
Redesignated 21st Photographic Squadron (Light) on 6 February 1943
Redesignated 21st Photographic Reconnaissance Squadron on 13 November 1943
Inactivated on 6 January 1946

- Redesignated the 21st Reconnaissance Squadron, Photographic on 11 March 1947 and allotted to the reserve

Activated on 1 October 1947
Inactivated on 27 June 1949

- Consolidated with the 921st Air Refueling Squadron as the 921st Air Refueling Squadron on 19 September 1985.

921st Expeditionary Air Refueling Squadron

- Constituted as the 921st Air Refueling Squadron on 20 May 1960

Activated on 1 October 1960
Inactivated on 15 December 1960

- Consolidated with the 21st Reconnaissance Squadron on 19 September 1985.
- Redesignated 921st Expeditionary Air Refueling Squadron on 12 June 2002

Activated by August 2011
Inactivated on 12 November 2011

=== Assignments ===
- 5th Photographic Group (later 5th Photographic Reconnaissance and Mapping Group), 2 September 1942
- Fourteenth Air Force, June 1943 – 6 January 1946
- 74th Reconnaissance Group, 1 October 1947 – 27 June 1949
- 11th Bombardment Wing, 1 October 1960 – 15 December 1960
- Air Mobility Command to activate or inactivate as needed, 12 June 2002

Unknown August 2011 – 12 November 2011

=== Stations ===
- Army Air Base, Colorado Springs (later Peterson Field), Colorado, 2 September 1942 – 27 April 1943
- Bishnupur Airfield, India, 27 June 1943

Flights at Kunming Airport, China, 12 July 1943 – 22 August 1943 and Kweilin Airfield, China, 12 July 1943 – 12 September 1944)

- Kunming Airport, China, 22 August 1943

Flights at Suichwan Airfield, China, 26 October 1943 – 26 June 1944 and ca. 12 November 1944 – 22 January 1945, Liangshan Airfield, China, April 1944 – 18 October 1944, Kanchow Airfield, China, August 1944 – 20 November 1944, Liuchow Airfield, China,, 10 September 1944 – 6 November 1944, Hanchung Airfield, China, 18 October 1944 – 13 August 1945, Luliang Airfield, China, ca. 26 November 1944 – 13 May 1945, Hsian Airfield, China, 5 February 1945 – ca. 5 October 1945, Laifeng Airfield, China, 7 May 1945 – 16 August 1945, Shwangliu Airfield, China, 14 May 1945, Ankang Airfield, China, 25 June 1945 – ca. 5 October 1945, and Chihkiang Airfield, China, 16 August 2045 – ca. 15 October 1945

- Hanchow Airfield, China, 18 October 1945 – ca. 15 December 1945
- Fort Lawton, Washington, 5 – 6 January 1946
- Stewart Air Force Base, New York, 1 October 1947 – 27 June 1949
- Altus Air Force Base, Oklahoma, 1 October 1960 – 15 December 1960
- Moron Air Base, Spain, by August 2011 – 12 November 2011

=== Aircraft ===
- North American F-4 (P-51 Mustang), 1943–1945
- Lockheed F-5 (P-38 Lighting), 1943–1945
- North American F-6 (P-51 Mustang), 1943–1945
- Curtiss P-40 Warhawk, 1943–1944
- North American B-25 Mitchell, 1945
- Boeing KC-135A Stratoranker, 1960

=== Campaigns ===
Campaign Streamer	Campaign	Dates	Notes
	Central Pacific	27 June 1943 – 6 December 1943	21st Photographic Squadron (later 21st Photographic Reconnaissance Squadron)
	India-Burma	27 June 1943 – 28 January 1945	21st Photographic Squadron (later 21st Photographic Reconnaissance Squadron)
	China Defensive	27 June 1943 – 4 May 1945	21st Photographic Squadron (later 21st Photographic Reconnaissance Squadron)
	New Guinea	27 June 1943 – 31 December 1944	21st Photographic Squadron (later 21st Photographic Reconnaissance Squadron)
	Air Offensive, Japan	27 June 1943 – 2 September 1945	21st Photographic Squadron (later 21st Photographic Reconnaissance Squadron)
	Western Pacific	17 April 1944 – 2 September 1945	21st Photographic Reconnaissance Squadron
	Central Burma	29 January 1945 – 15 July 1945	21st Photographic Reconnaissance Squadron
	China Offensive	5 May 1945 – 2 September 1945	21st Photographic Reconnaissance Squadron

== See also ==
- List of P-38 Lightning operators
- List of United States Air Force air refueling squadrons
