= 98th Flying Training Squadron =

Active US Air Force unit

98th Flying Training Squadron

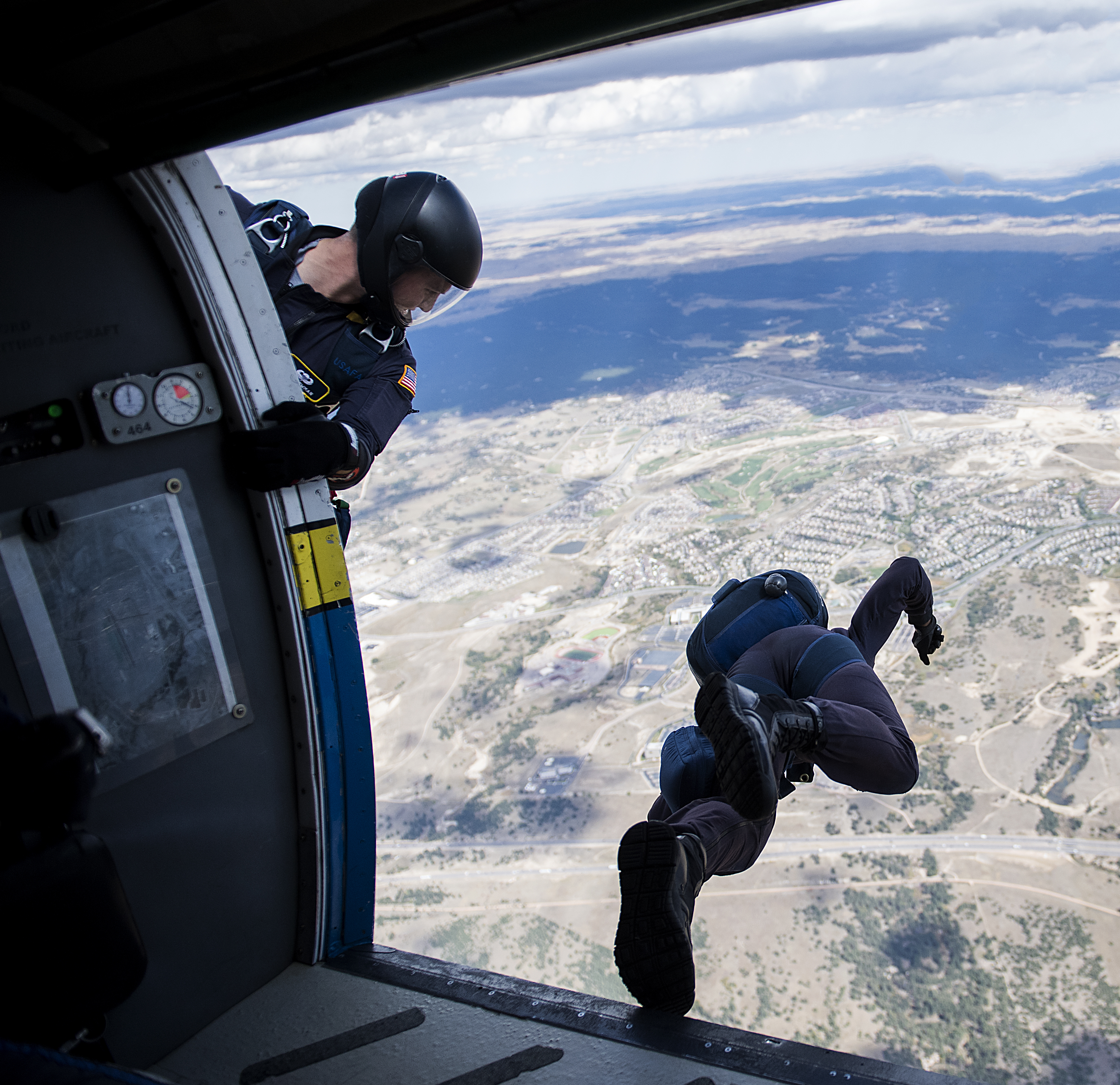
- Air Force Academy Wings of Blue and Navy Leap Frogs kickoff Navy vs Air Force
- Active: 1941–1948; 1948–1963; 1988–1992; 1994–present
- Country: United States
- Branch: United States Air Force
- Role: Parachute Training
- Part of: Air Education and Training Command
- Garrison/HQ: United States Air Force Academy
- Nickname: Wings of Blue
- Engagements: Southwest Pacific Theater; Pacific Ocean Theater
- Decorations: Distinguished Unit Citation; Presidential Unit Citation (Navy); Air Force Outstanding Unit Award

Insignia
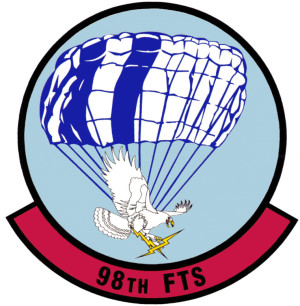
- 98th Flying Training Squadron emblem (Note: approved 14 March 1996.)

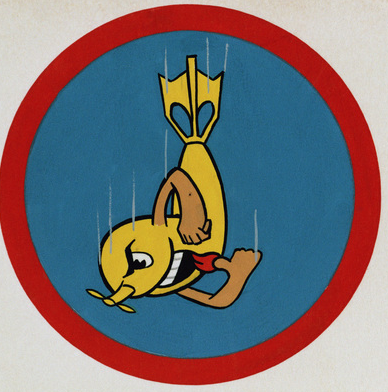
- 98th Bombardment Squadron emblem (Note: Approved 20 September 1944. Description: On a grayed medium blue disc, wide border red, a caricatured yellow orange aerial bomb with flesh color arms, face portraying impudence, with right thumb crossing red tongue, expressing pugnacious anticipation, while falling toward base and emitting speed lines to the rear.)

The 98th Flying Training Squadron is a United States Air Force unit assigned to the 306th Flying Training Group. It is stationed at the United States Air Force Academy, Colorado, however its De Havilland Canada UV-18 Twin Otter aircraft are housed and maintained at nearby Peterson Space Force Base, Colorado.

The mission of the 98th is to provide parachute training to cadets. The basic program trains 1,200 students per year with the majority of positions given to USAF Academy cadets. Reserve Officer Training Corps cadets are assigned positions through a nomination process.

== Overview ==
In 1995, the 98th Flying Training Squadron was reactivated as a parachute training squadron at the United States Air Force Academy (USAFA). With Air Staff approval to teach military parachuting, the parachute branch under the Airmanship Division of the USAFA was born in the Spring of 1966. In 1982, parachuting became a flight under the 94th Airmanship Training Squadron. In 1995, the parachute flight grew too large and was expanded into a squadron. What started as a club training 25 students a year has grown into a program training 600 to 1,200 cadets annually and fielding competition and demonstration teams.

The basic AM-490 program, which had used round parachutes since its conception, evolved with the use of modern piggy-back container systems and square parachutes for both the main and reserve. Each student is equipped with a radio so all landings can be assisted from the ground.

== Training ==
The "Wings of Blue" (sometimes known as PTWOBs, and stands for "Parachute Team – Wings of Blue"), is the parachuting unit at the USAFA, near Colorado Springs, Colorado.

Over the last several decades, the Wings of Blue has been one of the outstanding parachute units in the United States. Since 1967, cadets have dominated national intercollegiate parachuting, winning 21 national championships. They perform about 50 demonstrations each year, and have shown off their skills at the BCS National Championship, Orange Bowl, Copper Bowl, Fiesta Bowl, and Pro Bowl and most Air Force Falcons football games. The team travels locally, nationally, and internationally to perform in air shows and competitions. Their stated mission is to "[d]evelop airmen through flight in its purest form — Stand in the Door!"

=== Training history ===
Parachuting at the USAFA began in 1964 when a group of ambitious cadets took to the skies. The activity, at the time, was off-limits to cadets. Knowing full well the consequences if caught participating, their involvement was nonetheless revealed through their own irrepressible success. That spring, Cadet First Class (senior) Jay Kelley and Cadet Third Class (sophomore) Pete Johnston paired and won a novice team accuracy event—the academy's first gold medal in collegiate competition. Their achievements that day resulted in an invitational demonstration at the Pueblo Army Depot, after which the commander at Fort Carson sent a very nice letter to the USAFA superintendent, thanking him for allowing the fine young men of his skydiving team to participate". After a thorough investigation, the USAFA Commandant of Cadets, Brigadier General Robert W. Strong Jr. "had a dilemma on his hands. After all, balancing against the weight of these young men's sin was the positive publicity they had brought upon themselves and the Academy. However illegal their activities, they were on to something good".

Each year since then, more than 800 cadets, officers, and enlisted members, from both U.S. and foreign services, complete five free fall jumps and earn their parachutist badge and rating. The USAFA offers the only military jump program in the world authorized to allow students to perform unassisted free fall delays on their first jump without any prior jump experience. It is common for civilian-trained skydivers to do so. Although parachutist wings are awarded, they are non-operational in any Department of Defense unit; to be in an airborne operational unit or functioned job, personnel must complete the United States Army Airborne School in Fort Benning, Georgia.

=== Training programs ===
==== Airmanship 490 ====
Airmanship 490 (AM-490) is the basic free fall course instructed by members of the Wings of Blue. Students enrolled in the course undergo more than 30 hours of ground training prior to their first free fall jump. The ground training introduces and develops procedures and techniques for high altitude free fall, and for operating a steerable parachute system. The course focuses on safety and emergency procedures to aid the students' ability to overcome their fears and perform under the extremely stressful and potentially life-threatening situations they may encounter.

Prior to each of the five jumps, students class receive two gear inspections prior to boarding the aircraft to ensure their parachutes are fitted and working properly. These inspections guarantee that the parachute's main and reserve canopy firing devices are on and accurately calibrated. Students also receive a briefing from the jumpmaster before loading the aircraft. Once airborne, the jumpmaster determines the exit/opening point, which varies with the day's wind patterns, student's receive their third and final gear inspection as the plane turns inbound for the jump run. At 5,000 feet above ground level, the jumpmaster opens the door then instructs the first jumper to: "Stand in the door!"

==== Airmanship 491 ====
Before the Fall semester begins, 25 cadets entering their second year at the academy are selected from approximately 200 applicants for an upgrade program into the Wings of Blue, known informally as the "Wings of Green." In their first semester in AM-491, cadets undergo accelerated freefall training and receive their USPA A license. In the Spring semester, students complete the training to become jumpmasters and instruct an AM-490 class under the supervision of senior cadets on the Wings of Blue. After a year of training, the Wings of Green graduate onto the Wings of Blue and become AM-490 instructors and aircrew members for the 98th Flying Training Squadron operations.

==== Airmanship 496 ====
Airmanship 496 (AM-496) is composed of the junior and senior Wings of Blue members. This group is divided into the junior competition/demonstration team, and the senior competition/demonstration team.

Both the junior and senior competition teams are composed of approximately ten members: two four-way teams, and one two-member team performing vertical relative work, also known as freefly. All 20 members compete in canopy accuracy as well. In the aerial events, teams are given 35 to 40 seconds to complete a preplanned formation maneuvers after exiting the plane. Jumpers exit with a videographer who records the jump for judging. The competition team represents the Wings of Blue at numerous competitions across the country, including the National Skydiving Championships, National Collegiate Parachuting Championships, Black and Gold Competition (an all military competition), and numerous other free fall and accuracy meets throughout the year. The PTWOB competition team has been recognized as the leading collegiate team in the nation 29 of the last 39 years.

The demonstration team is composed of the remaining team members in the AM-496 program. This team represents the Wings of Blue around the nation at Air Force forums, air shows, football games, and various other sporting events, and at other civilian requests. Their act is composed of relative work consisting of colored smoke jumping, and flag/streamer presentations. The demo team is also well known for its appearance at major college football bowl games during the holiday season, as well as Monday Night Football games.

== History ==
=== World War II ===
On 1 February 1940, the 11th Bombardment Group was activated at Hickam Field, Hawaii, with four squadrons assigned or attached as the United States built up its forces in the Pacific. However, in the fall of 1941, its 14th Bombardment Squadron deployed to the Philippines. In early December, the 14th was reassigned to the 7th Bombardment Squadron, which was programmed to reinforce the air garrison there. On 16 December 1941, shortly after the attack on Pearl Harbor, the 98th Bombardment Squadron was activated at Hickam to fill the gap left in the 11th Group left by the departure of the 14th Squadron. The squadron flew Douglas B-18 Bolos while equipping for combat with Boeing B-17 Flying Fortresses

The squadron flew patrol and search missions from the Hawaiian Islands, including air support during the Battle of Midway. In June 1942, shortly after the Battle of Midway, the 11th Group was authorized as a mobile force by the Army Air Forces in order to respond to a Navy request by Admiral Nimitz for long-range armed search planes to locate Japanese fleets, accompanied with firepower to withstand defending Japanese interceptors while tracking the fleet. The 11th Group left Hawaii to support Navy operations in the South Pacific Theater during the Guadalcanal and Northern Solomon Islands Campaigns.

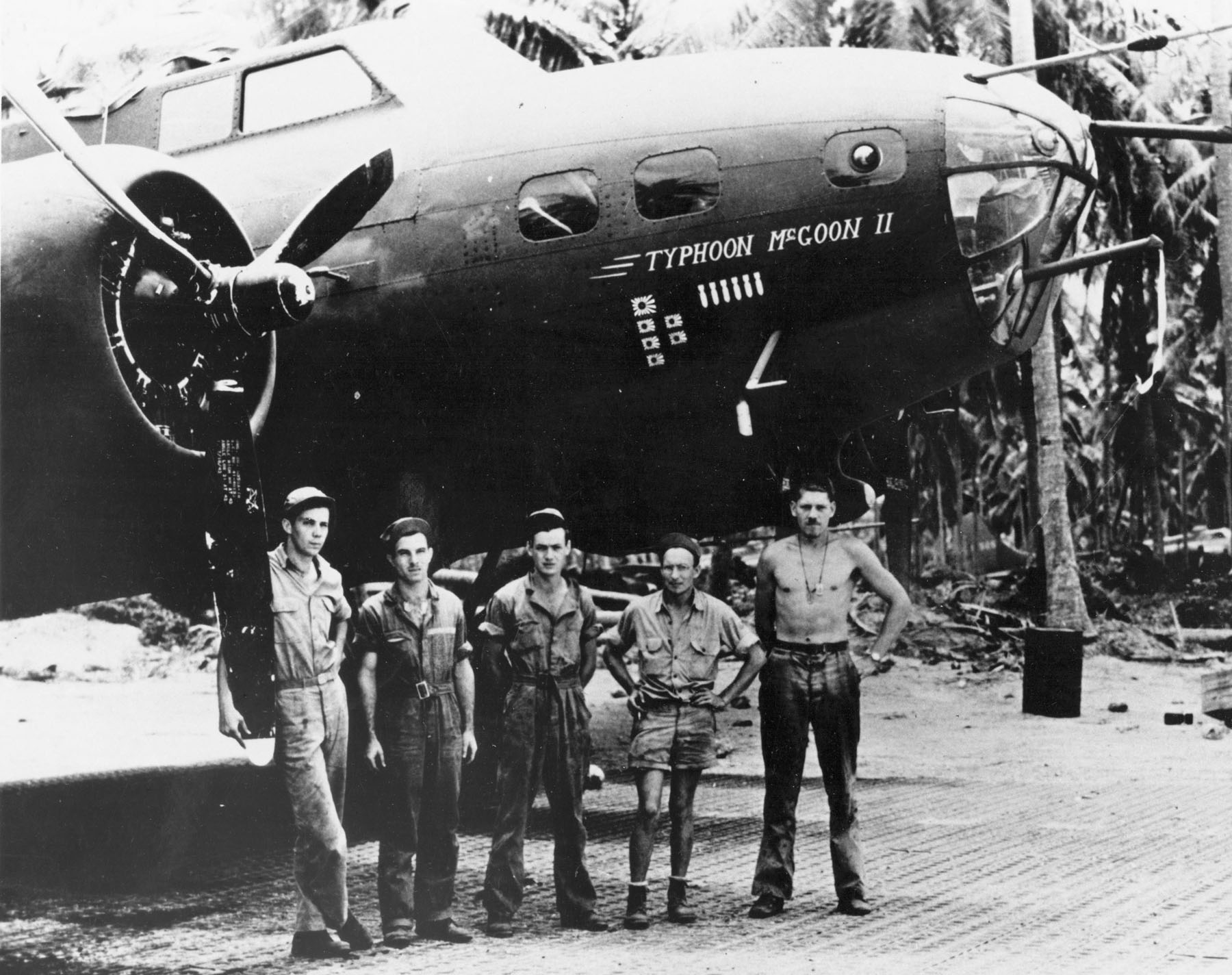
Squadron B-17E Flying Fortress "Typhoon McGoon II" on Plaine Des Gaiacs Airfield, New Caledonia in January 1943 (Note: Aircraft is Boeing B-17E Flying Fortress serial 41-9211, Typhoon McGoon II. The crew was flying this aircraft on a reconnaissance patrol on 14 November 1942 when they spotted a large Japanese task force north-west of Guadalcanal. The crew claimed six Japanese kills of escort aircraft shot down on the mission.)

The squadron moved to the New Caledonia on 21 July 1942 and became part of Thirteenth Air Force. It bombed airfields, supply dumps, ships, docks, troop positions, and other objectives in the South Pacific from July to November 1942, and received a Distinguished Unit Citation for those operations. It continued operations in the South Pacific, attacking Japanese airfields, installations, and shipping until late March 1943.

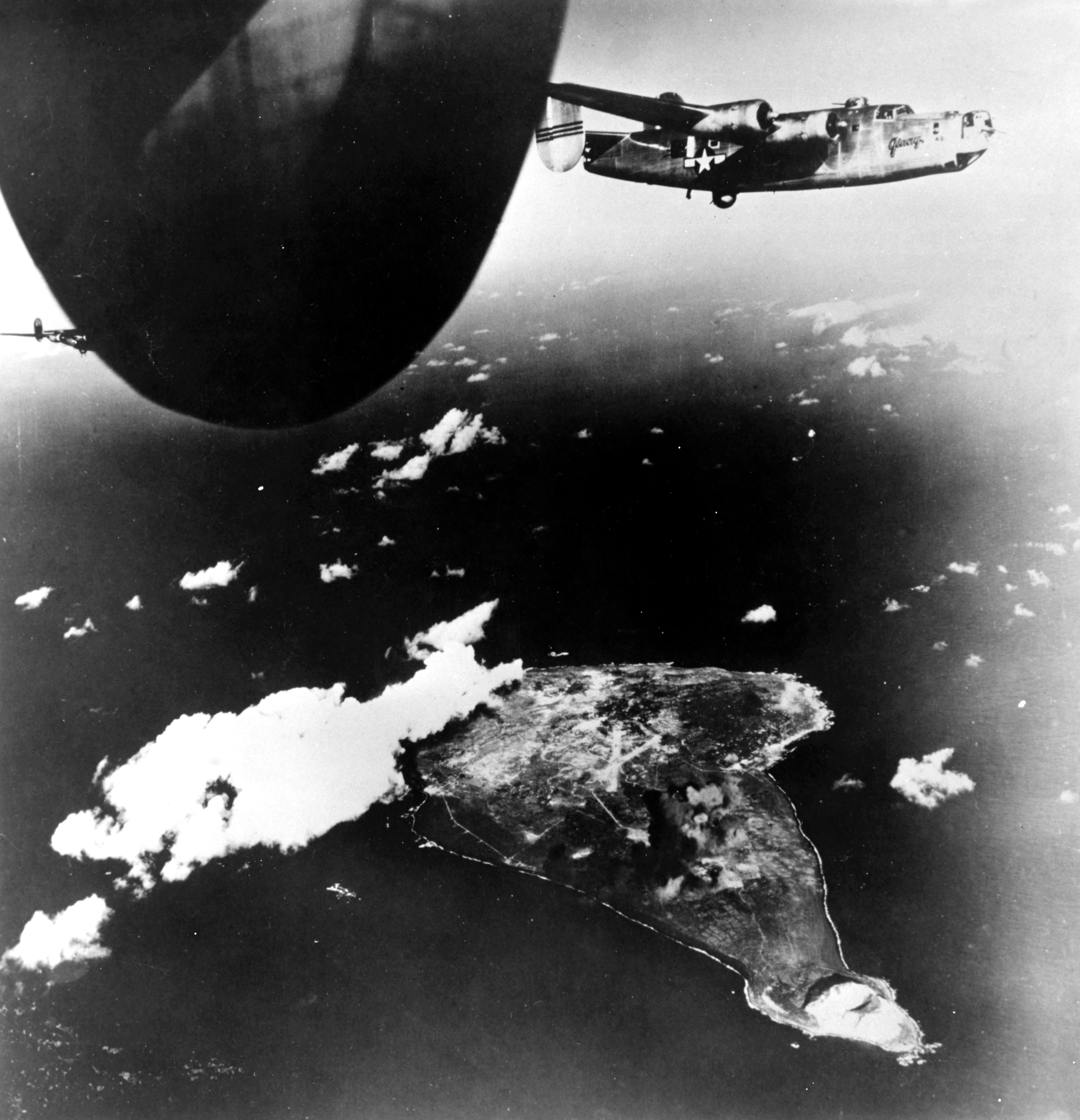
11th Group B-24 Liberators after attacking Iwo Jima on 15 December 1944

The squadron returned to Hawaii and the control of Seventh Air Force on 8 April 1943. In Hawaii, the squadron equipped with Consolidated B-24 Liberator bombers, which it flew until the end of the war. Its training Included missions against Wake Island and other central Pacific bases held by the Japanese. It deployed to the Gilbert Islands on 11 November 1943 and resumed combat participating in the Allied offensive through the Gilbert, Marshall and Marianas Islands, while operating from Funafuti, Tarawa, and Kwajalein.

"The [squadron] moved to Guam on 25 October 1944 and attacked shipping and airfields in the Volcano and Bonin Islands. It moved to Okinawa on 2 July 1945 to participate in the final phases of the air offensive against Japan, bombing railways, airfields, and harbor facilities on Kyushu and striking Japanese airfields in Eastern China."

=== Postwar operations in the Pacific ===
After V-J Day, the squadron flew surveillance and reconnaissance missions over China and ferried former prisoners of war to the Philippines. In December 1945 the squadron moved without personnel or equipment to Fort William McKinley, Philippines. At the end of April 1946, it was designated as a very heavy bomber unit. The following month, it moved to Northwest Field, Guam and began to re-equip with Boeing B-29 Superfortresses, but terminated all operations and training by October. The squadron remained on Guam on paper until inactivating on 20 October 1948.

=== Strategic Air Command ===
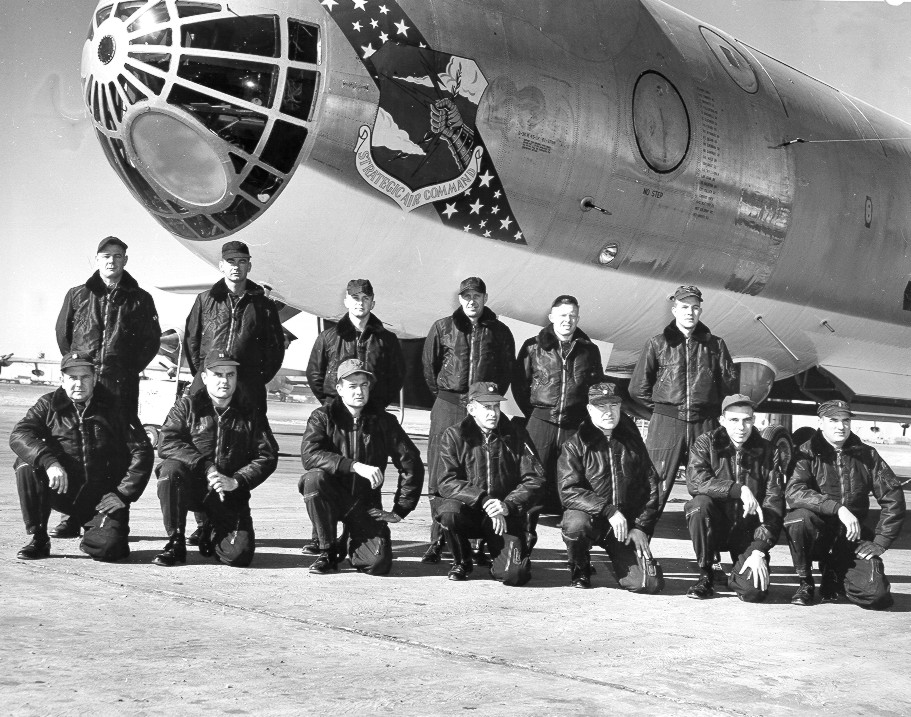
11th Wing B-36 and crew at Carswell Air Force Base

The squadron was activated at Carswell Air Force Base, Texas in December 1948 as a Convair B-36 Peacemaker strategic bombardment squadron.

In 1959, the squadron was reassigned to Strategic Air Command (SAC)'s 4123d Strategic Wing, and was re-equipped with Boeing B-52E Stratofortress intercontinental heavy bombers. It moved to Clinton-Sherman Air Force Base, Oklahoma in SAC's program to disperse its heavy bomber force. The squadron conducted worldwide strategic bombardment training missions and provided nuclear deterrent. it was inactivated in 1963 when SAC inactivated its strategic wings, replacing them with permanent Air Force controlled wings. Its aircraft, personneland equipment were transferred to the 6th Bombardment Squadron, which was simultaneously activated.

=== Pilot training ===
The squadron was reactivated in 1988 as an undergraduate pilot training squadron at Williams Air Force Base, Arizona, and equipped with the Cessna T-37 Tweet. It was inactivated in 1992 with the closure of Williams.

== Lineage ==
- Constituted as the 98th Bombardment Squadron (Heavy) on 2 December 1941

Activated on 16 December 1941
Redesignated 98th Bombardment Squadron, Heavy on 25 June 1943
Redesignated 98th Bombardment Squadron, Very Heavy on 30 April 1946
Inactivated on 20 October 1948

- Redesignated 98th Bombardment Squadron, Heavy and activated on 1 December 1948

Discontinued and inactivated on 1 February 1963

- Redesignated 98th Flying Training Squadron on 29 April 1988

Activated on 1 June 1988
Inactivated on 26 June 1992

- Reactivated on 31 October 1994

=== Assignments ===
- 11th Bombardment Group, 16 December 1941 – 20 October 1948
- 11th Bombardment Group, 1 December 1948 (attached to 11th Bombardment Wing after 16 February 1951)
- 11th Bombardment Wing, 16 June 1952
- 4123d Strategic Wing, 10 December 1957 – 1 February 1963
- 82d Flying Training Wing, 1 June 1988
- 82d Operations Group, 15 December 1991 – 26 June 1992
- 34th Operations Group, 31 October 1994 – 1 October 2004
- 306th Flying Training Group, 1 October 2004 – present

=== Stations ===
- Hickam Field, Hawaii, 16 December 1941
- Luganville Airfield, Espiritu Santo, New Hebrides, 11 August 1942 (operated from Plaine Des Gaiacs Airfield, New Caledonia, 21 July-11 August 1942, Henderson Field, Guadalcanal, November 1942)
- Mokuleia Airfield, Hawaii, 8 April 1943
- Nukufetau Airfield, Nukufetau, Gilbert and Ellice Islands, 11 November 1943
- Hawkins Field (Tarawa), 20 January 1944
- Kwajalein Airfield, Kwajalein, Marshall Islands, 3 April 1944
- Agana Airfield, Guam, 21 October 1944
- Kadena Airfield, Okinawa 2 July 1945
- Fort William McKinley, Luzon, Philippines, December 1945
- Northwest Field (later Harmon Field, Harmon Air Force Base), Guam, 15 May 1946 – 20 October 1948
- Carswell Air Force Base, Texas, 1 December 1948 (deployed to RAF Brize Norton, England, 27 June–7 July 1952; Nouasseur Air Base, French Morocco; 6–14 April, 30 June–29 July 1954, 2–9 May 1955, 15–27 February and October 1956)
- Clinton-Sherman Air Force Base, Oklahoma, 1 March 1959 – 1 February 1963
- Williams Air Force Base, Arizona, 1 June 1988 – 26 June 1992
- United States Air Force Academy, Colorado, 31 October 1994 – present

=== Aircraft ===
- Douglas B-18 Bolo, 1942
- Boeing B-17 Flying Fortress, 1942–1943
- Consolidated B-24 Liberator, 1943–1945
- Boeing B-29 Superfortress, 1946.
- Convair B-36 Peacemaker, 1949–1957
- Boeing B-52 Stratofortress, 1958–1963
- Cessna T-37 Tweet, 1988–1992
- DeHavilland Canada UV-18B Twin Otter, 1994–present

== See also ==
- List of B-52 Units of the United States Air Force
