= 1st Helicopter Squadron =

VIP Helicopter Squadron of the US Air Force base in the National Capital Region

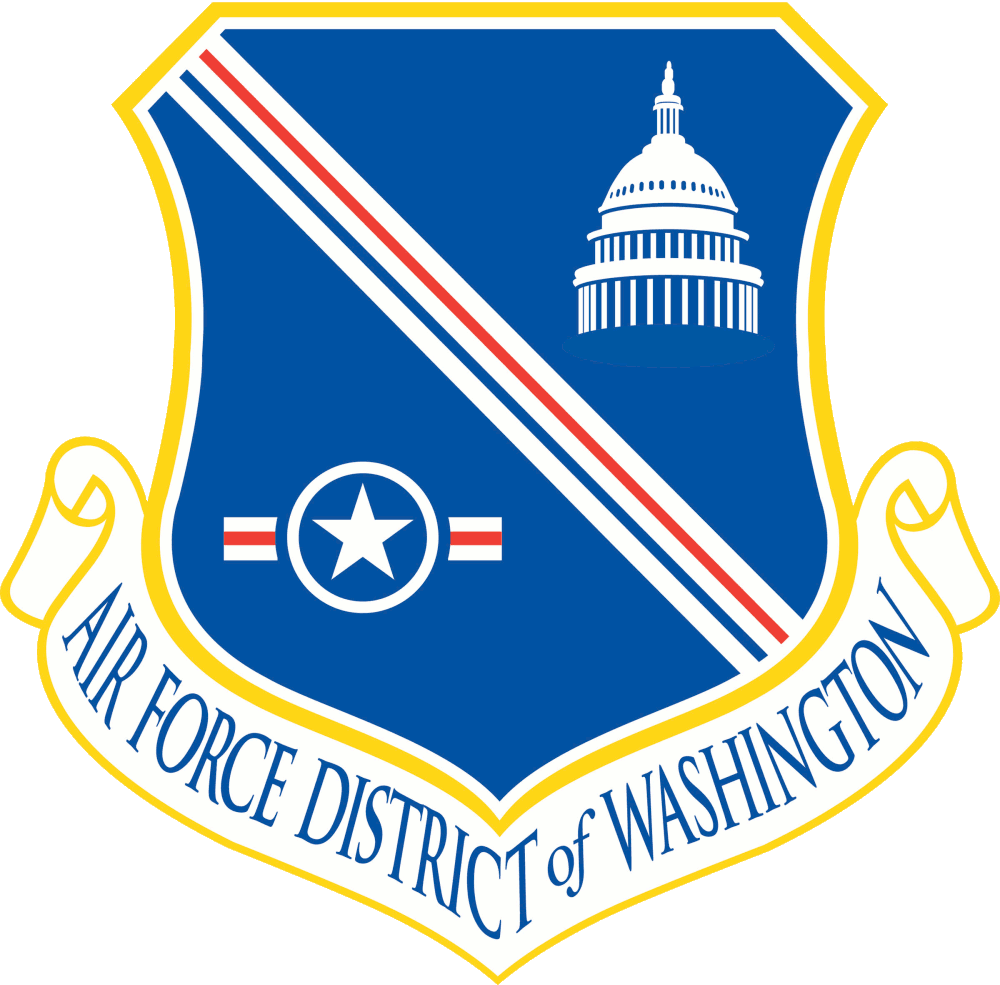
1st Helicopter Squadron

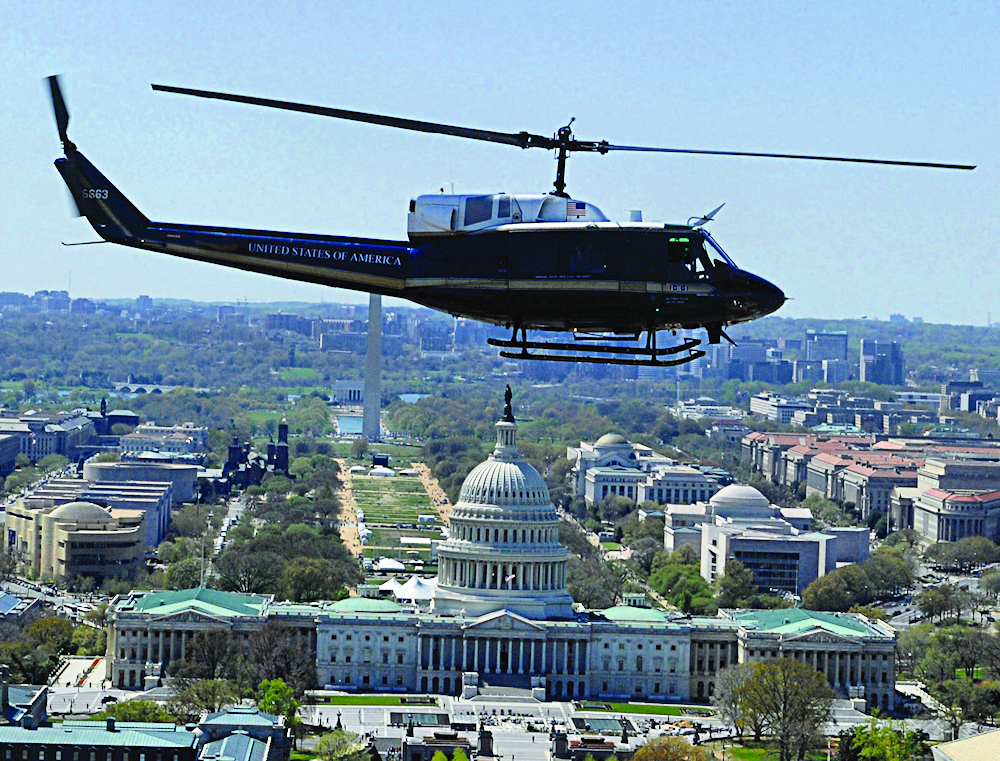
- Bell UH-1N Twin Huey of the 1st Helicopter Squadron flying over Washington DC (Note: Aircraft is Bell UH-1N Twin Huey serial 66-16663)
- Active: 1944–1945; 1969–present
- Country: United States
- Branch: United States Air Force
- Role: Helicopter Airlift
- Part of: Air Force District of Washington
- Garrison/HQ: Andrews Air Force Base
- Mottos: First and Foremost
- Engagements: China Burma India Theater
- Decorations: Distinguished Unit Citation; Air Force Outstanding Unit Award

Insignia
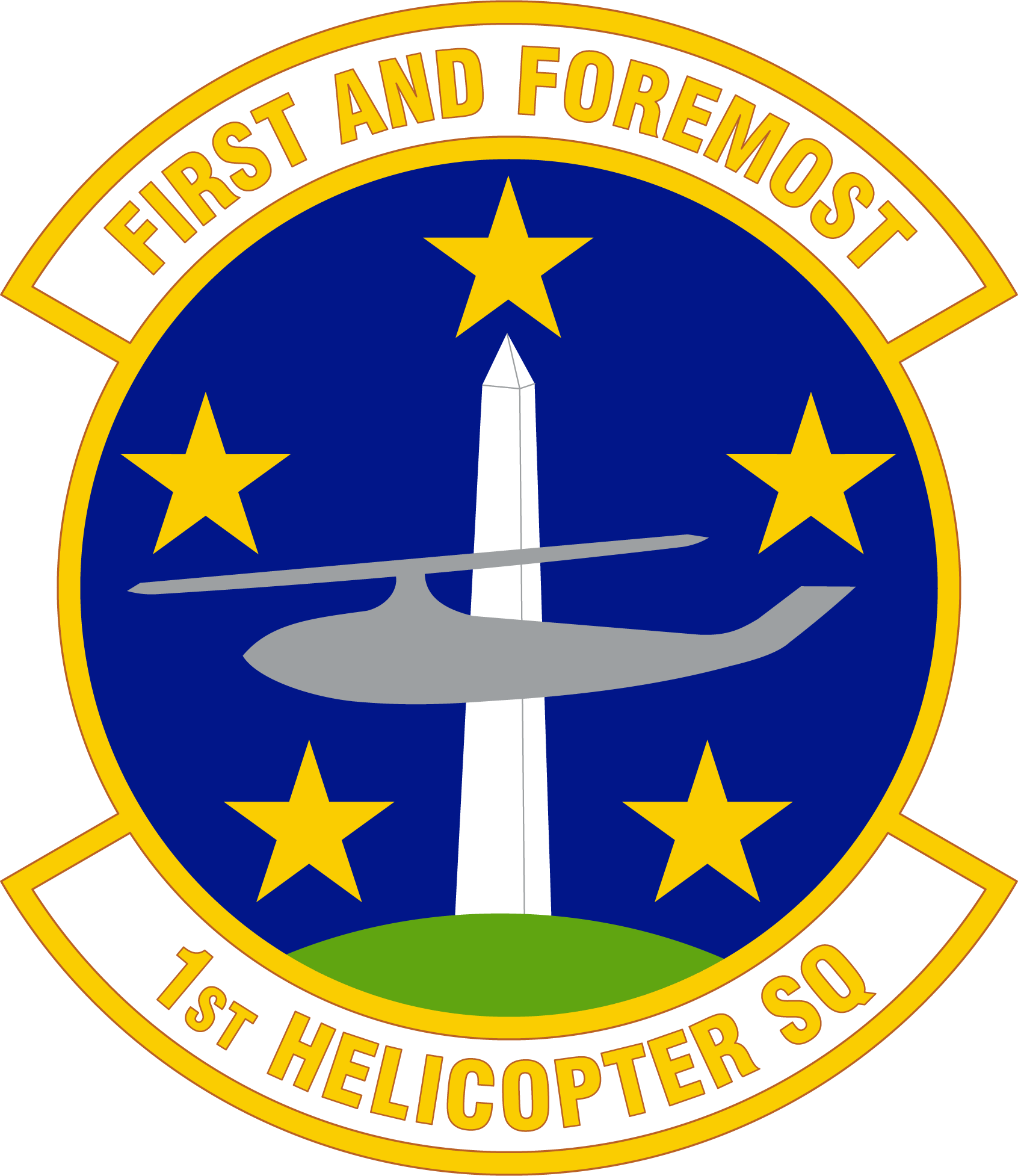
- 1st Helicopter Squadron emblem (Note: Approved 25 February 1970.)

Aircraft flown
- Helicopter: UH-1N

The 1st Helicopter Squadron is a United States Air Force unit based at Joint Base Andrews, Maryland reporting to the 316th Operations Group, administratively controlled by Air Force District of Washington.

== Mission ==
The 1st Helicopter Squadron's primary mission is to be prepared to evacuate high-ranking personnel from the Capital area in the event of a national emergency. It also supports Washington D.C. area airlift for high-ranking Executive Branch, dignitaries, military leaders and other VIPs. The squadron also supports search and rescue missions.

== History ==
=== World War II ===
The squadron was first activated in February 1944 as the 1st Fighter Reconnaissance Squadron and equipped with a mix of P-51 fighter and F-6 reconnaissance Mustangs. It trained for operations with Third Air Force and trained at the Army Air Force School of Applied Tactics. Moved to India, September–November 1944 assigned to Tenth Air Force. Combat in CBI, 14 February-9 May 1945. After May 1945 in training. Returned to the US during October— November 1945.

The 1st flew combat missions in the China Burma India Theater from 14 February to 9 May 1945 as a fighter unit.

The squadron was consolidated with the 1st Helicopter Squadron in September 1985.

=== Capital area helicopter airlift ===
==== Background ====
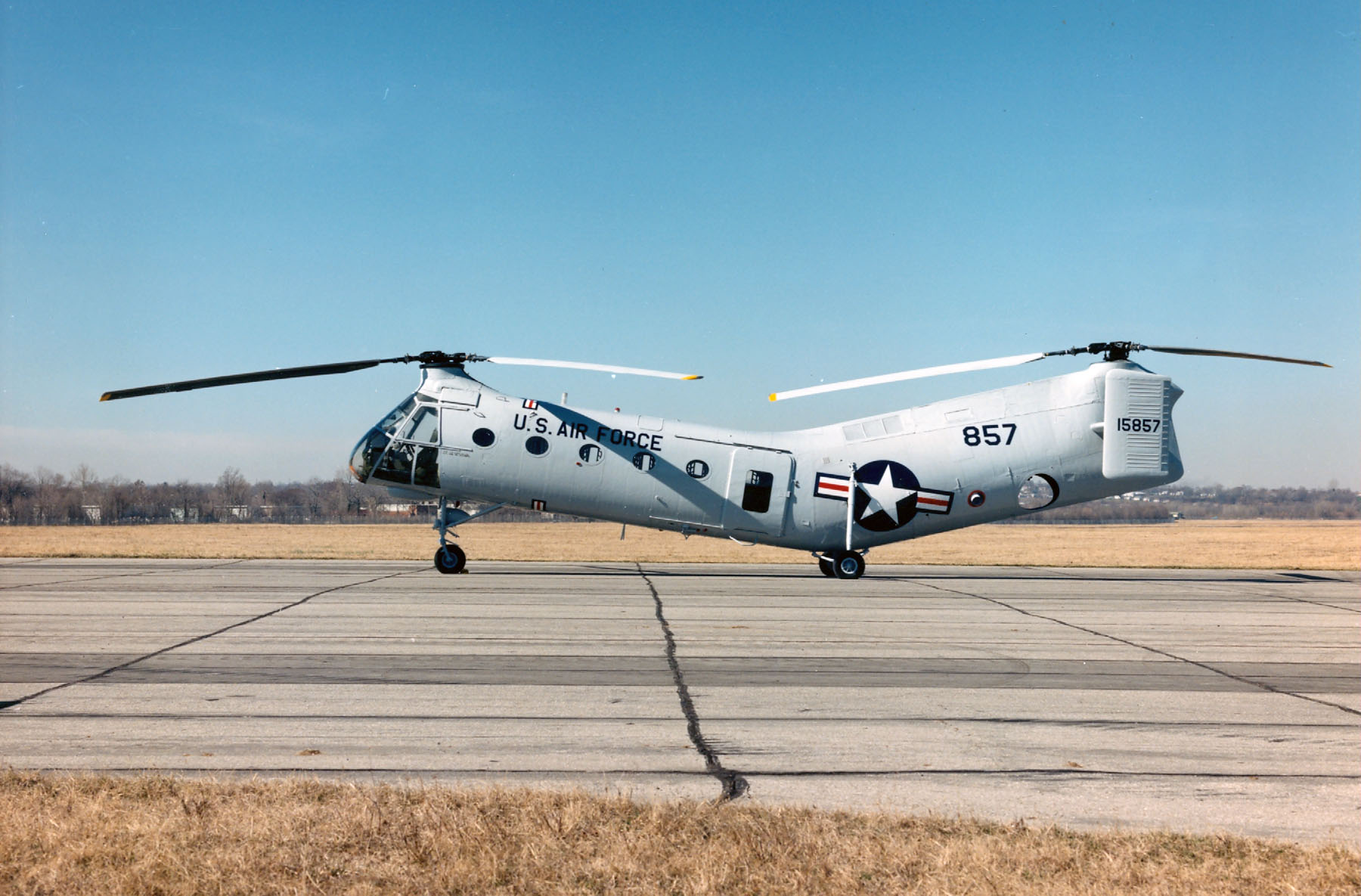
CH-21B Workhorse

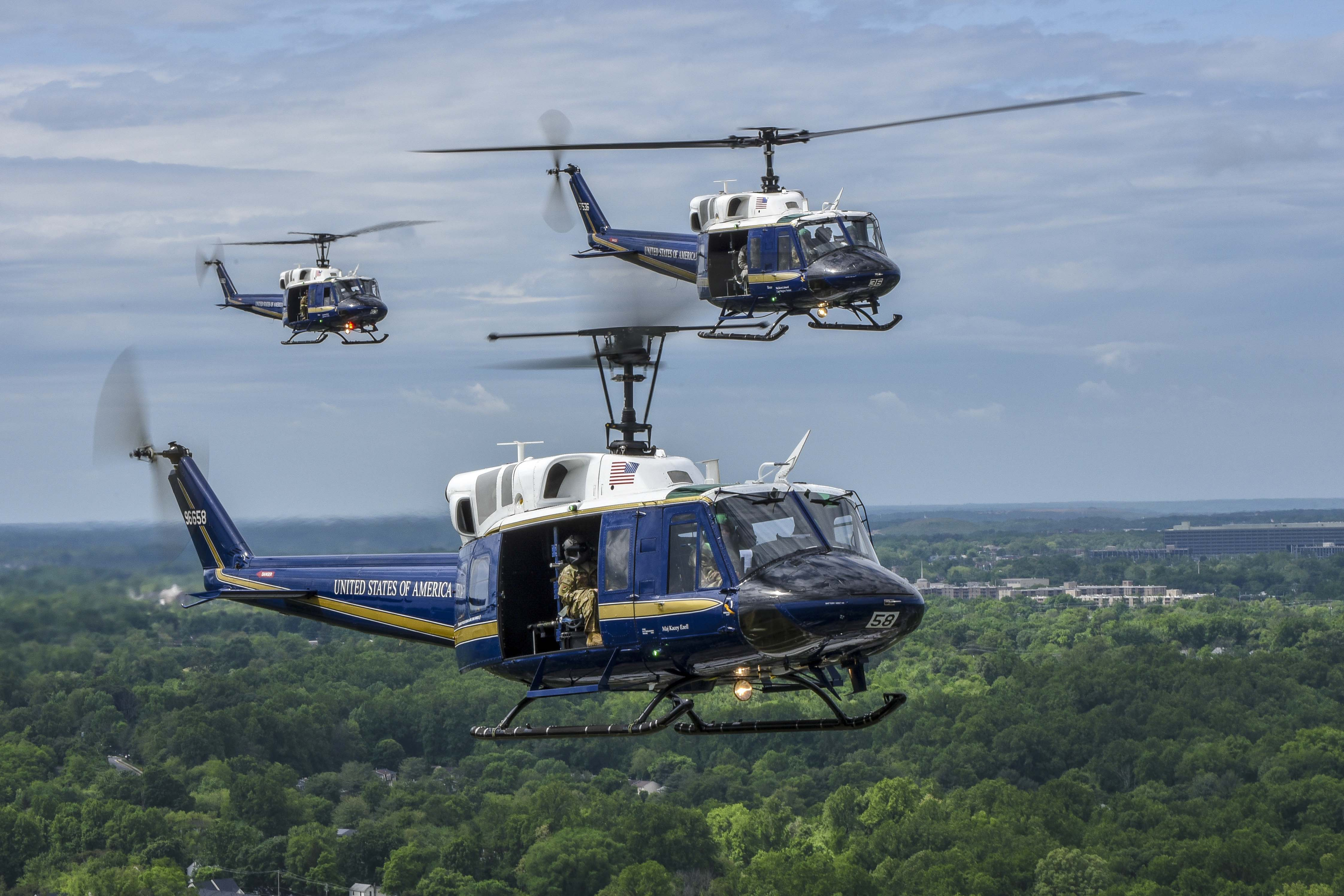
The 1st Helicopter Squadron flies UH-1 Hueys over Washington, May 2019.

The Air Force's use of helicopters to transport 'distinguished persons' in the Capital area go back to August 1955, when Military Air Transport Service organized the 1401st Helicopter Flight at Andrews Air Force Base, Maryland. In July 1957, a helicopter from the 1401st landed on the lawn of the White House to transport President Eisenhower, marking the unit's first presidential airlift flight. In October 1957, the flight was transferred to Headquarters Command, which required renumbering it as the 1001st Helicopter Flight. (Note: From 1948 to the early 1990s, the Air Force allotted blocks of numbers to its commands and other direct reporting headquarters that they could use to number units under their control.) The flight moved to Bolling Air Force Base in 1963. Expanding demands for helicopter airlift resulted in the flight expanding to the 1001st Helicopter Squadron. On 7 September 1968 the 1001st returned its operations to Andrews.

The squadron received the Air Force's flying safety award in 1963. In 1966, it dropped supplies to snowbound civilians following a blizzard.

In 1969 Headquarters Command replaced the 1001st, which was a MAJCON (four-digit) unit and could not continue its history, with a unit controlled by Headquarters, USAF, which could continue its history. The conversion was one of unit category and number only and the new squadron would continue the mission and assume the manning and resources of the discontinuing 1001st. The new squadron was entitled to all the awards earned by the 1001st, but not its lineage. (Note: To prevent future confusion, Headquarters Command was also barred from activating another unit and naming it the 1001st Helicopter Squadron.)

==== New squadron assumes helicopter airlift mission ====
Since activation in 1969, the 1st Helicopter Squadron has provided local airlift for the Executive Department, high-ranking dignitaries, and distinguished visitors, as well as support for emergency evacuation of key government officials, search and rescue, and emergency medical evacuation. The squadron maintains a helicopter on alert for short notice mission assignments.

In January 1983 Air Florida Flight 90 crashed into the 14th Street bridge during a blizzard. The squadron participated in the following relief efforts despite the unfavourable weather conditions at the time.

Currently the squadron operates Bell UH-1N Twin Huey helicopters acquired in the early 1970s. Air Force Global Strike Command also operates the UH-1N and has proposed the Common Vertical Lift Support Platform (CVLSP) program to seek a replacement to their UH-1Ns. On June 7, 2022, it was announced that Joint Base Andrews will be the fourth base to the host the new Boeing MH-139 Grey Wolf which replaces the UH-1N.

== Lineage ==
1st Fighter Squadron

- Constituted as the 1st Fighter Reconnaissance Squadron on 11 April 1944

Activated on 20 April 1944
Redesignated 1st Fighter Squadron, Commando on 2 June 1944
Inactivated on 12 November 1945
Disbanded on 8 October 1948
Reconstituted and consolidated with the 1st Helicopter Squadron as the 1st Helicopter Squadron on 19 September 1985

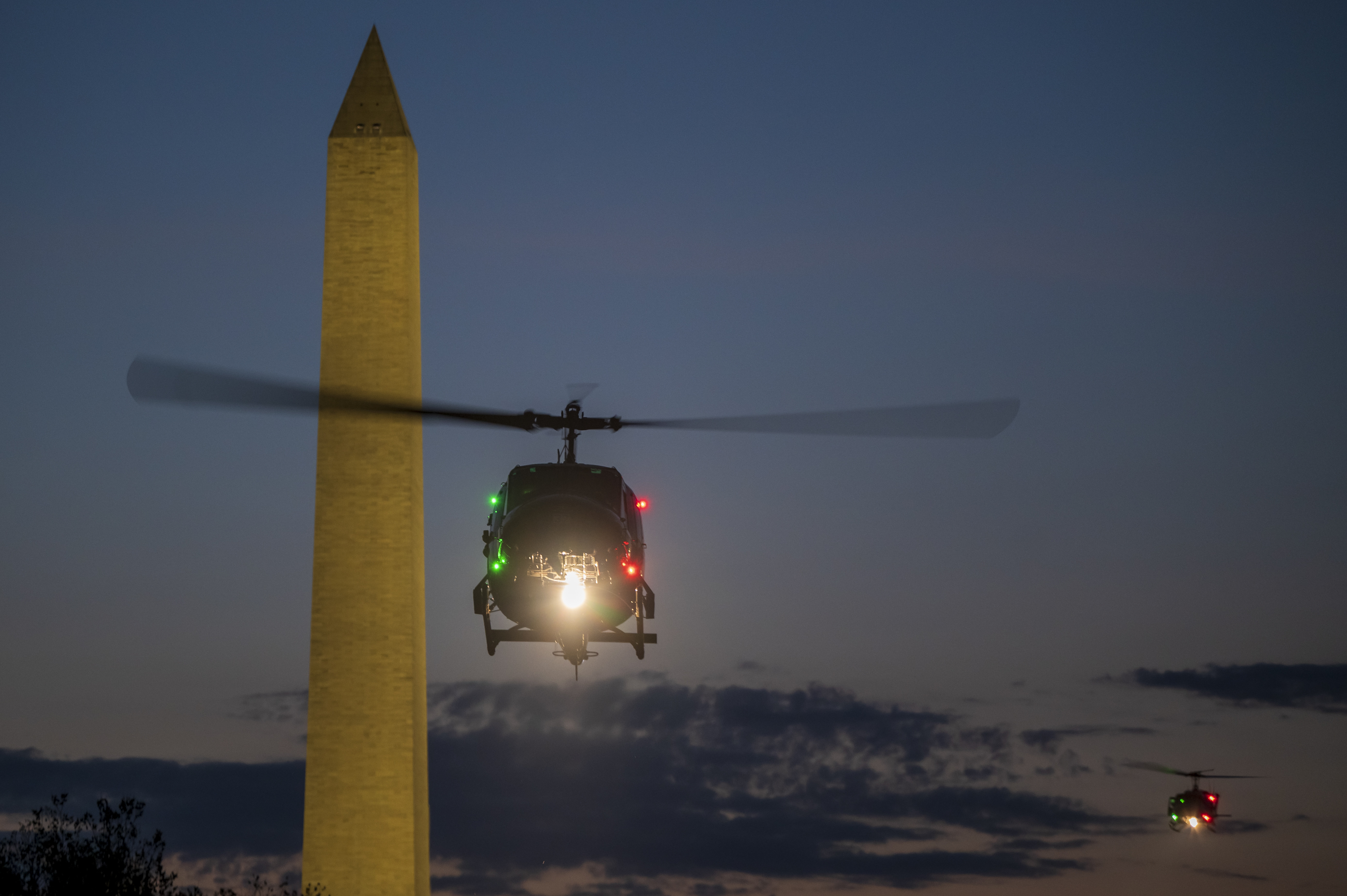
Two UH-1N Hueys from the 1st Helicopter Squadron prepare to land on the National Mall, Washington, D.C., April 2023.

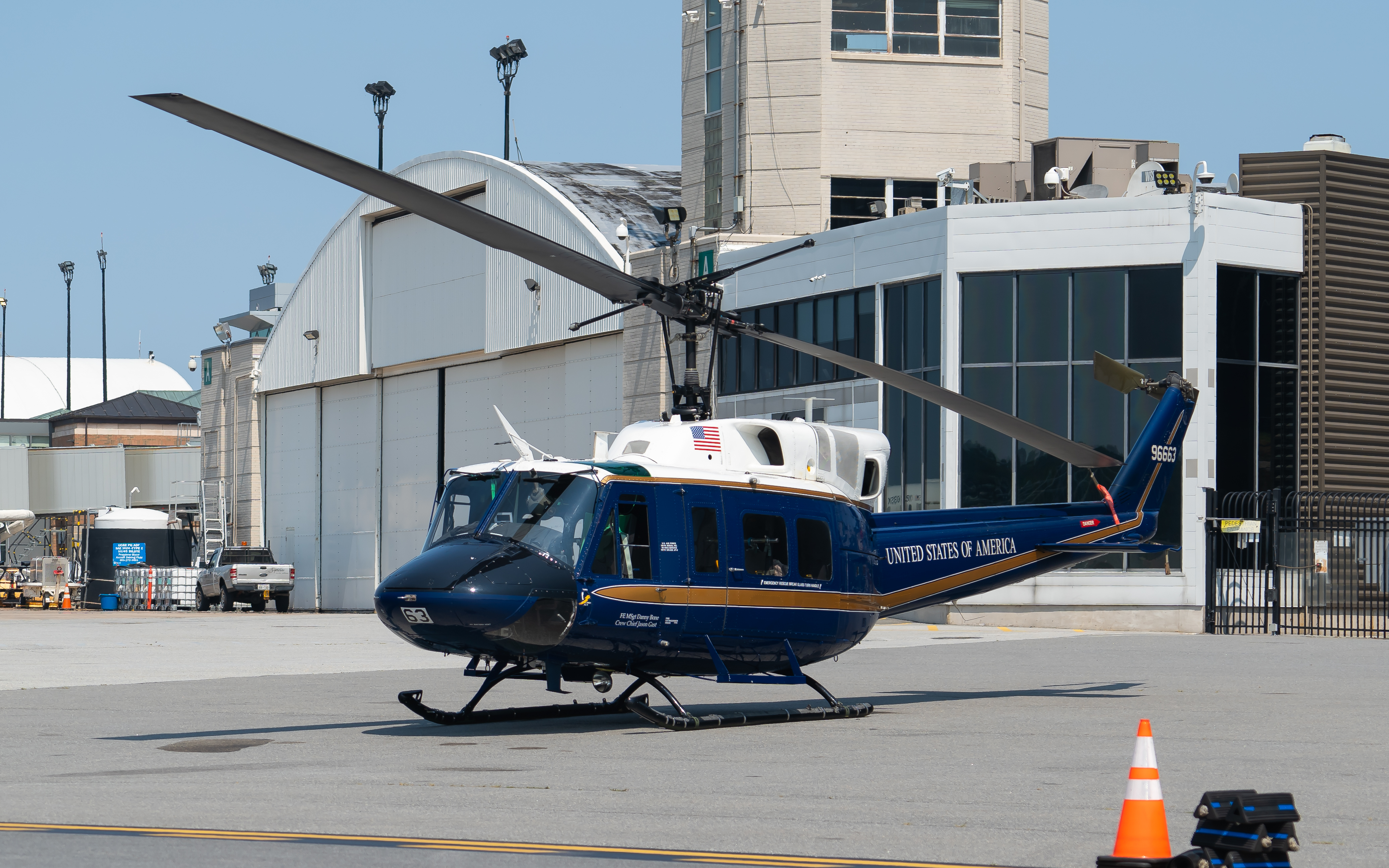
A UH-1N Huey of the 1st Helicopter Squadron at Westchester County Airport (KHPN), August 2023.

1st Helicopter Squadron

- Constituted as the 1st Helicopter Squadron on 9 May 1969

Activated on 1 July 1969
Consolidated with the 1st Fighter Squadron on 19 September 1985

=== Assignments ===
- Third Air Force, 20 April 1944
- 2d Air Commando Group, 22 April 1944 – 12 November 1945
- 1st Composite Wing, 1 July 1969
- 89th Military Airlift Wing (later 89 Military Airlift Group, 89 Military Airlift Wing), 1 Jul 1976
- 89th Operations Group, 12 July 1991
- 316th Operations Group, 22 June 2006
- 811th Operations Group, 1 November 2010
- 316th Operations Group, 25 June 2020 – present

==== Stations ====
- Lakeland Army Air Field, Florida, 20 April 1944
- Cross City Army Air Field, Florida, 12 June 1944
- Alachua Army Air Field, Florida, 21 June 1944
- Drew Field, Florida, 17 August 1944
- Lakeland Army Air Field, Florida, 22 August-23 October 1944
- Kalaikunda Airfield, India, 14 December 1944
- Cox's Bazar, Bangladesh, 13 February 1945
- Kalaikunda Airfield, India, 10 May-22 October 1945
- Camp Kilmer, New Jersey, 11–12 November 1945
- Andrews Air Force Base (later, Joint Base Andrews-Naval Air Facility Washington), Maryland, 1 July 1969 – present

==== Aircraft ====
- North American P-51 Mustang (1944–1945)
- North American F-6 Mustang (1944)
- Piasecki CH-21 Workhorse (1969–1970)
- Bell TH-1 Huey (1969–1970)
- Bell UH-1N Twin Huey (1970–present)
- Sikorsky CH-3 (1970–1988)

=== 1001st Helicopter Squadron ===
==== Lineage ====
- Designated as the 1401st Helicopter Flight and organized on 14 August 1955

Redesignated 1001st Helicopter Flight on 1 October 1957
Redesignated 1001st Helicopter Squadron 15 April 1962
Discontinued on 9 May 1969

==== Stations ====
- Andrews Air Force Base, Maryland, 14 August 1955
- Bolling Air Force Base, District of Columbia, 7 August 1963
- Andrews Air Force Base, Maryland, 7 September 1968 – 1 July 1969

==== Aircraft ====
- Sikorsky H-19 (1955-unknown)
- Piasecki CH-21 Workhorse (1955–1969)
- Bell TH-1 Huey (unknown-1969)
