= Kaifeng Air Base =

Kaifeng Air Base
- IATA: none; ICAO: none

Summary
- Airport type: Military
- Serves: Kaifeng
- Location: Kaifeng, China
- Coordinates: 34°45′16″N 114°20′21″E

Map

Runways
Direction	Length		Surface
Direction	ft	m	Surface
03/21	8,125	2,462	Concrete

Kaifeng Air Base is a People's Liberation Army Air Force Base, located about 1 mile southeast of Kaifeng (Henan Province) in the People’s Republic of China.

== History ==
During World War II, the airport was known as Laifeng (Kaifeng) Airfield and was used by the United States Army Air Forces Fourteenth Air Force as part of the China Defensive Campaign (1942–1945). Laifeng was the home of the Chinese-American Joint Intelligence Agency, and operated as a photo-reconnaissance base, with unarmed P-38 Lightning aircraft fitted with cameras flying over Japanese-held areas during the spring and summer of 1945. The American units ended operations from the airfield after the war ended in September 1945.
