= 811th Operations Support Squadron =

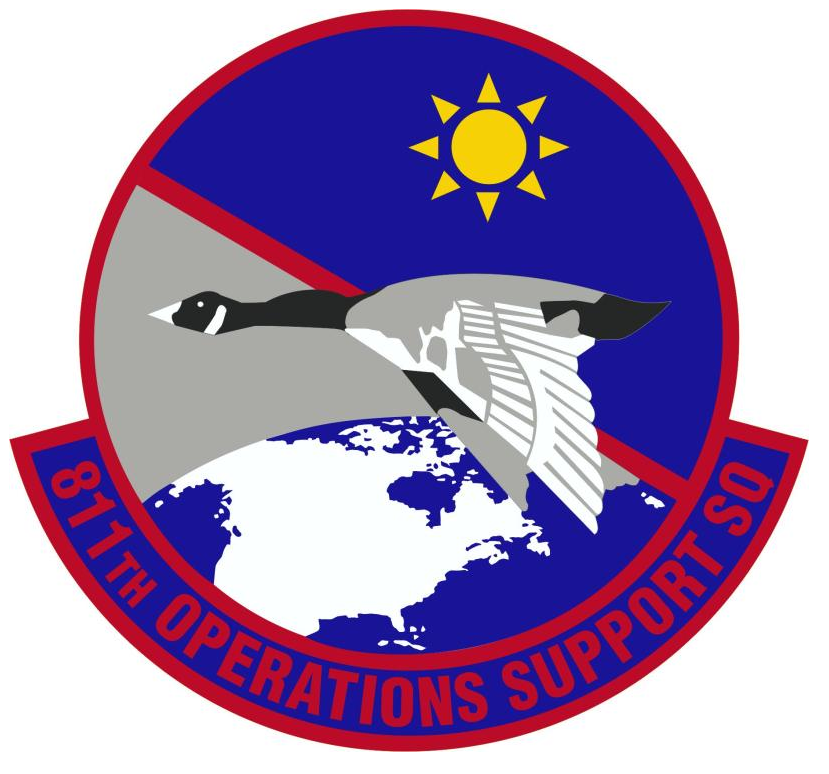
- Active: Present
- Country: United States of America
- Branch: United States Air Force
- Type: Operations Group
- Role: Helicopter Airlift
- Home Port: Joint Base Andrews
- Mascot: Goose

Aircraft flown
- Patrol: UH-1N Iroquois

The 811th Operations Support Squadron is a squadron of the United States Air Force.

It provides aviation equipment, services, support, and training across the National Capital Region (NCR). Support elements to the airlift mission include: helicopter maintenance, formal aircrew syllabus training, flying hour program management, aircrew flight equipment, simulator program management and development of tactics and plans. Additionally, the 811th OSS houses the NCR's Host Aviation Resource Management. The 811th OSS provides first-line weather maintenance on five geographically separated airfields.

Originally the 811th Operations Squadron was established in 1952 as part of the 811th Air Base Group at Bergstrom Air Force Base, Texas. Years later, the 811th OSS was stood up in 2010 with the creation of the 811th Operations Group. The services provided by the 811th OSS continued those provided by the inactivated 316th Operations Support Squadron, which supported the 1st Helicopter Squadron as well as the 89th Airlift Wing’s Special Airlift Missions under Air Mobility Command.

== Lineage ==
Formed as 811th Operations Squadron on 19 Jun 1952. Activated on 1 Jul 1952. Inactivated on 25 Sep 1957. Redesignated as 811th Operations Support Squadron on 6 May 2010. Activated on 1 Oct 2010.

== Assignments ==
- 811th Air Base Group, 1 Jul 1952-25 Sep 1957.
- 811th Operations Group, 1 Oct 2010-.
