= State funerals in the United States =

Funeral rites reserved for U.S. state officials or important citizens

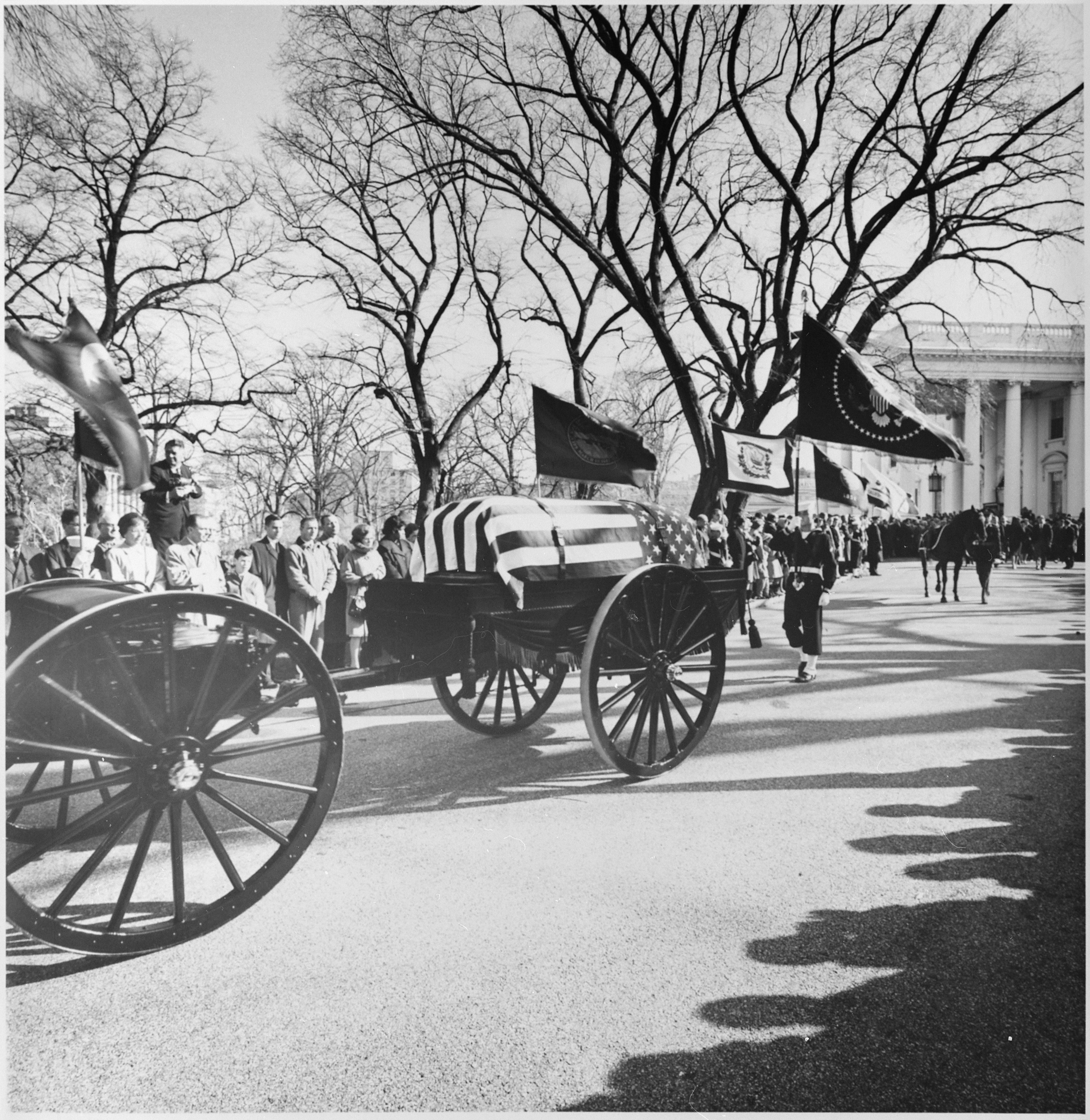
The caisson bearing the casket of John F. Kennedy moving down the White House drive on the way to St. Matthew's Cathedral on November 25, 1963.

In the United States, state funerals are the official funeral rites conducted by the federal government in the nation's capital, Washington, D.C., that are offered to a sitting or former president, a president-elect, high government officials and other civilians who have rendered distinguished service to the nation. Administered by the Military District of Washington (MDW), a command unit of the Joint Force Headquarters National Capital Region, state funerals are greatly influenced by protocol, steeped in tradition, and rich in history. However, the overall planning as well as the decision to hold a state funeral, is largely determined by the family of the honoree, upon invitation by the government.

== History and development ==
=== Funerals of Founding Fathers ===
==== Benjamin Franklin ====
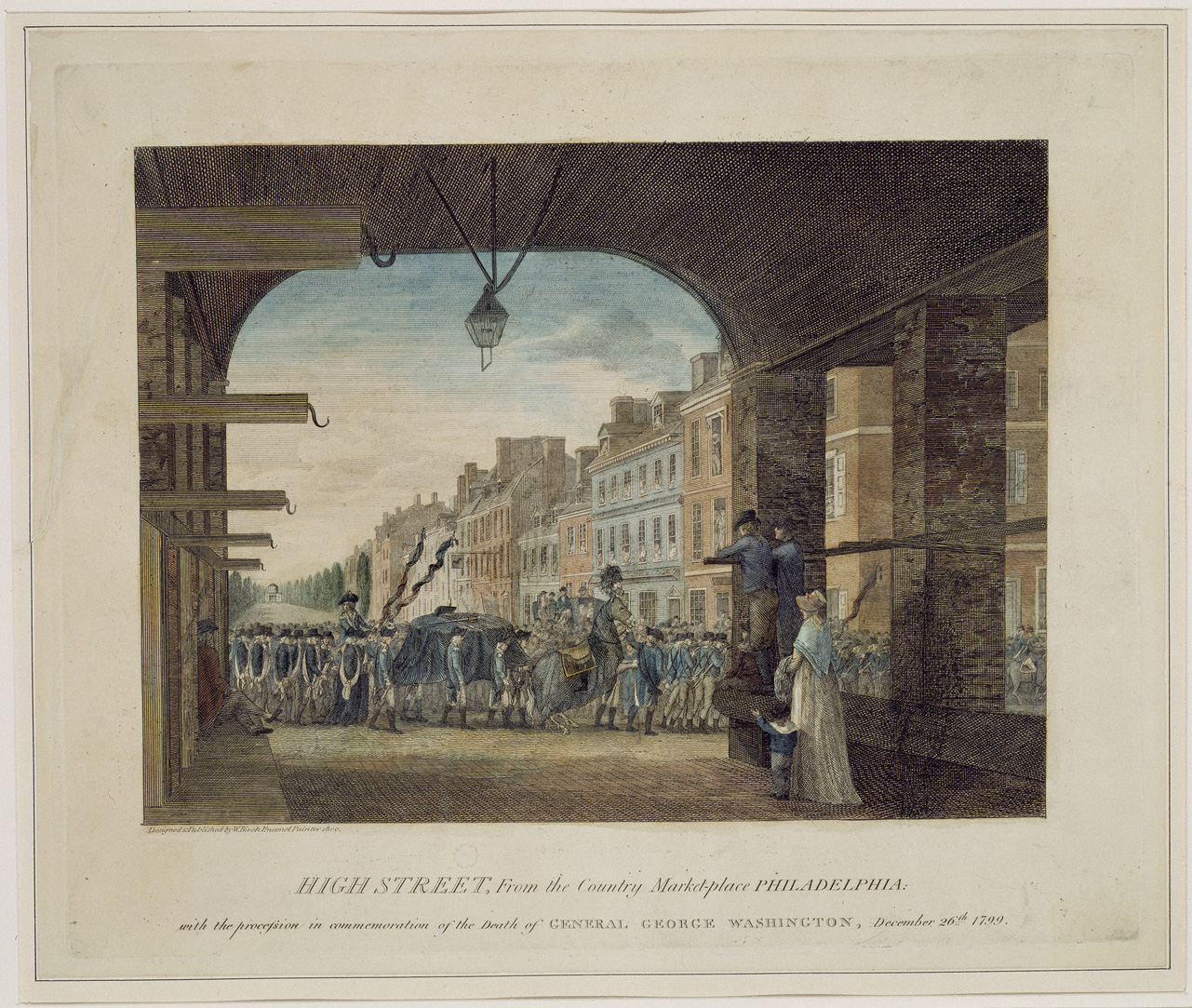
A Birch's Views of Philadelphia sketch depicting George Washington's mock funeral procession on High Street in Philadelphia on December 26, 1799.

The first general mourning was proclaimed in the United States in 1790, upon the death of Benjamin Franklin, and in 1799, following the death of George Washington. Preparations for Franklin's funeral after his death on April 17, 1790, included a funeral procession to the Pennsylvania State House (now known as Independence Hall) in Philadelphia and burial at Christ Church Burial Ground on April 21. It is estimated that 20,000 mourners gathered for Franklin's funeral. The cortege was composed of Philadelphia society, ranging from Mayor Samuel Powel to American astronomer David Rittenhouse. Muffled bells rang and flags on the mast of ships as well as atop all government buildings flew at half-staff. The United States Congress convened in New York City, which at the time served as the nation's capital, and passed a concurrent resolution observing an official period of mourning for one month. The French National Assembly, at the suggestion of Honoré Gabriel Riqueti, comte de Mirabeau, was so moved by the death of Franklin that the legislature observed a three-day period of mourning.

==== George Washington ====
When Washington died at his Mount Vernon plantation on December 14, 1799, Congress, then meeting in Philadelphia, selected Henry Lee III to give a eulogy. Mock funerals were held all over the United States. An elaborate mock funeral was held in Philadelphia on December 26. At dawn, sixteen cannons were fired and volleys were shot on a half-hour basis. An empty casket was carried in a procession which consisted of two marines wearing black scarves escorting a riderless horse festooned with black and white feathers, and a bald eagle depicted on the horse's breast. A religious service was held at the German Lutheran Church officiated by the Reverend William White, an Episcopal Church in the United States bishop. Washington's death was mourned not just in his own country; the news of his death had a profound effect in Europe. In France, Napoleon Bonaparte as First Consul, asked Louis-Marcelin de Fontanes to give a eulogy and ordered a ten-day requiem. All Royal Navy ships were ordered to lower their ensigns at half-mast.

Washington's actual funeral was a simple ceremony, organized by the local Masonic lodge and held on December 18. In his will, Washington stated, "[I]t is my express desire that my Corpse may be Interred in a private manner, without parade, or funeral Oration." The funeral procession consisted of the president's casket mounted on and using a caisson, foot soldiers, clergy, and a caparisoned, riderless horse. Upon arrival at a red brick tomb on a hillside in the environs of Mount Vernon, the casket was placed on a wood bier for grieving mourners to gather around for a final viewing and clergy to conduct funeral rites. Reverend Thomas Davis, rector of Christ Church, Alexandria, read the Episcopal Order of Burial. Next, the Reverend James Muir, minister of the Alexandria Presbyterian Church, and Dr. Elisha Dick, conducted the traditional Masonic funeral rites.

==== Thomas Jefferson ====
Two former presidents, Thomas Jefferson and John Adams, died within hours of each other on July 4, 1826, the 50th anniversary of the adoption of the Declaration of Independence. Jefferson's funeral, held in Charlottesville, Virginia, at 5:00 p.m. on July 5, 1826, was simple. No invitations were sent out for the religious service officiated by Reverend Frederick Hatch at the Episcopal Church in Charlottesville. Only friends and family members gathered at his gravesite on the grounds of Monticello. It is likely that Jefferson's casket was wooden, built by Monticello slave John Hemings.

==== John Adams ====
The funeral of John Adams at the First Congregational Church (now known as the United First Parish Church) in Quincy, Massachusetts, was held on July 7 and was attended by an estimated crowd of 4,000 people. Pastor Peter Whitney officiated the service. Although many people in Boston wanted Adams's funeral to be held at the State House using taxpayer money, this idea was rejected by the Adams family. Nevertheless, cannons were fired from Mount Wollaston, bells were rung, and the procession that took the president's casket from the Adams' home to the church was followed by Massachusetts Governor Levi Lincoln Jr., Harvard University President John Thornton Kirkland, members of the state legislature, and United States Congressman Daniel Webster.

=== History of presidential state funerals in Washington ===
==== Early days ====
===== William Henry Harrison =====
The first state funeral was for William Henry Harrison, who died on April 4, 1841, after only one month in office. As he was the first U.S. president to die in office, there was no established way of mourning a deceased incumbent president. Alexander Hunter, a Washington merchant, was commissioned to plan the ceremony. Hunter had the White House draped in black ribbon and ordered a curtained, upholstered black and white carriage to carry Harrison's casket. An invitation-only religious service was held in the East Room. Dirges were played by the United States Marine Band during the funeral procession to the Congressional Cemetery where interment occurred.

===== Zachary Taylor =====
When Zachary Taylor died on July 9, 1850, 1 year, 4 months into his term of office, he was given a state funeral similar in its details to Harrison's. Behind Taylor's black-and-white caisson, his horse "Old Whitey" followed riderless, with a pair of riding boots reversed in the stirrups.

==== First presidents to lie in state ====
===== Abraham Lincoln =====
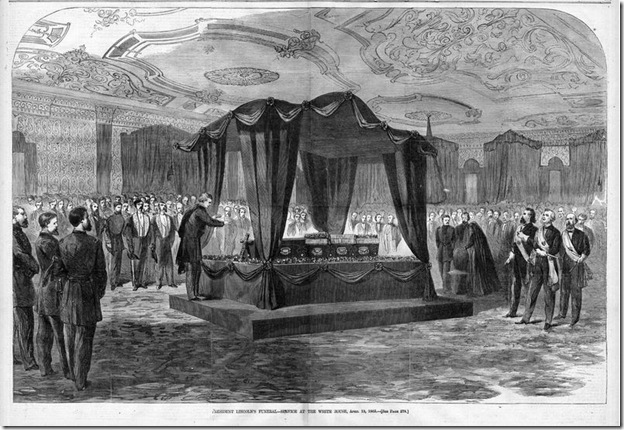
A Harper’s Weekly drawing depicting the remains of Abraham Lincoln lying in repose in the East Room of the White House on April 18, 1865.

It was not until the assassination of Abraham Lincoln on April 14, 1865, that the United States experienced a period of true national mourning, made possible by innovations like the railroad and telegraph. Inconsolable, Mary Todd Lincoln did not attend Lincoln's religious service in the East Room of the White House, which was conducted by Reverend Phineas D. Gurley. On the Easter Sunday after Lincoln's death, clergymen around the nation praised the president in their sermons. Millions of people witnessed Lincoln's funeral procession from Washington, D.C., on April 19, 1865, as his casket was transported 1,700 miles (2,700 km) by train through New York City to Springfield, Illinois. Lincoln was the first president to lie in state in the United States Capitol Rotunda.

===== James Garfield =====
The remains of James A. Garfield arrived in the nation's capital on September 21, two days after his death. A floral arrangement was mounted on his casket, complemented with ornate "stuffed doves of peace". A large crowd of mourners numbering over 100,000 people viewed his casket as he lay in state in the Capitol rotunda.

==== State funerals in the 20th century ====
===== William McKinley =====
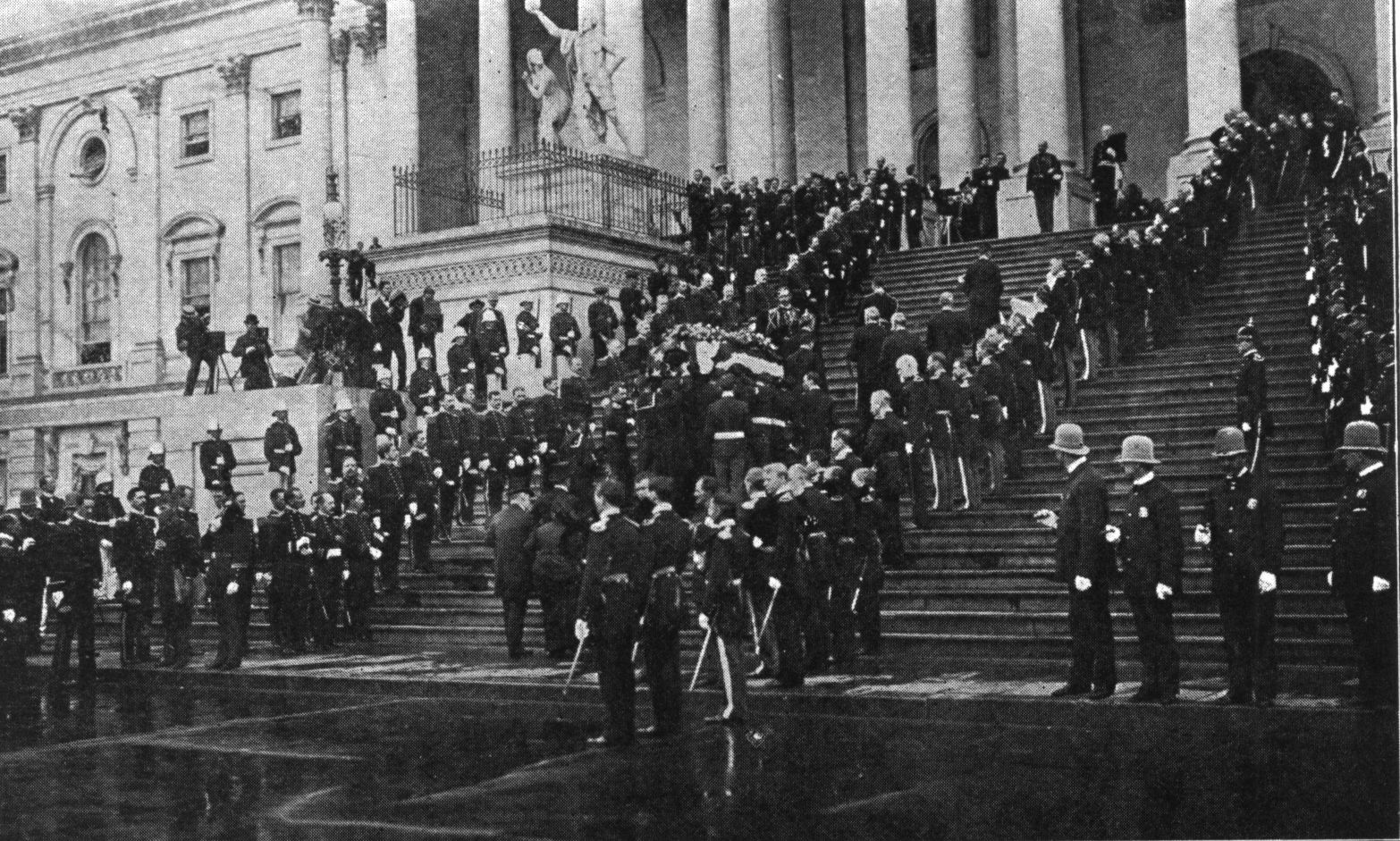
A guard of honor carrying the casket of William McKinley up the center steps of the Capitol for the lying in state on September 17, 1901.

When the funeral train of William McKinley arrived in Washington, D.C., on September 16, 1901, two days after his death, the casket was taken to the East Room in the White House where a lavish display of palms, fruit trees, and floral arrangements transversed into the Cross Hall. The following day, McKinley's casket was transported to the Capitol rotunda to lie in state.

===== Warren G. Harding =====
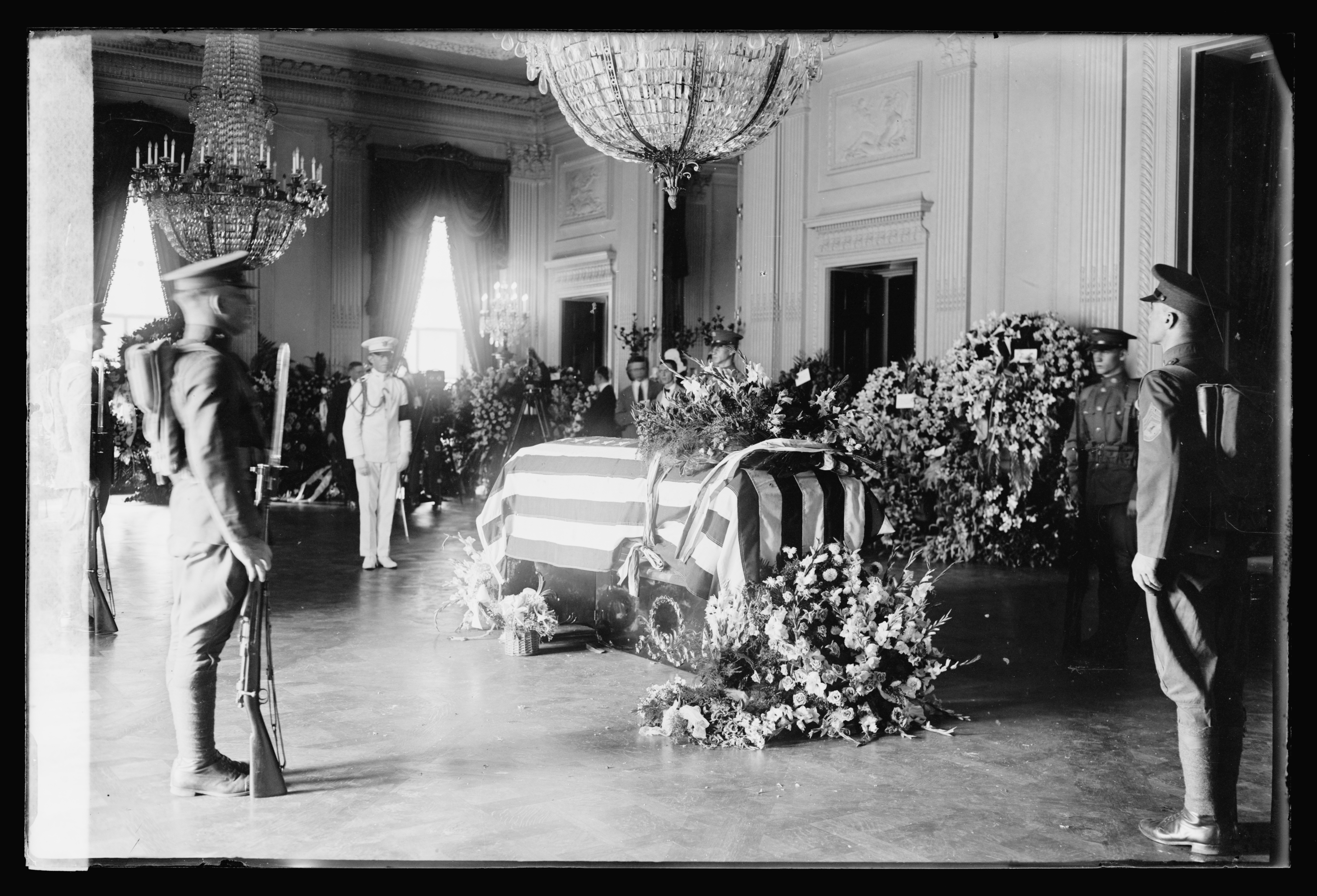
The remains of Warren G. Harding lying in repose in the East Room of the White House on August 7, 1923.

Warren G. Harding died unexpectedly in San Francisco on August 2, 1923. When Harding's funeral train arrived at Washington Union Station on August 7, the casket was taken to the East Room in the White House. The following morning, the casket was mounted on a caisson and taken to the Capitol to lie in state. A funeral service was held in the presence of members of Congress, the Cabinet, and dignitaries inside the Capitol rotunda. The silver casket was covered with a flag, a spread eagle, and topped off with red, white, and blue flowers personally designed by Harding's widow Florence.

===== William Howard Taft =====
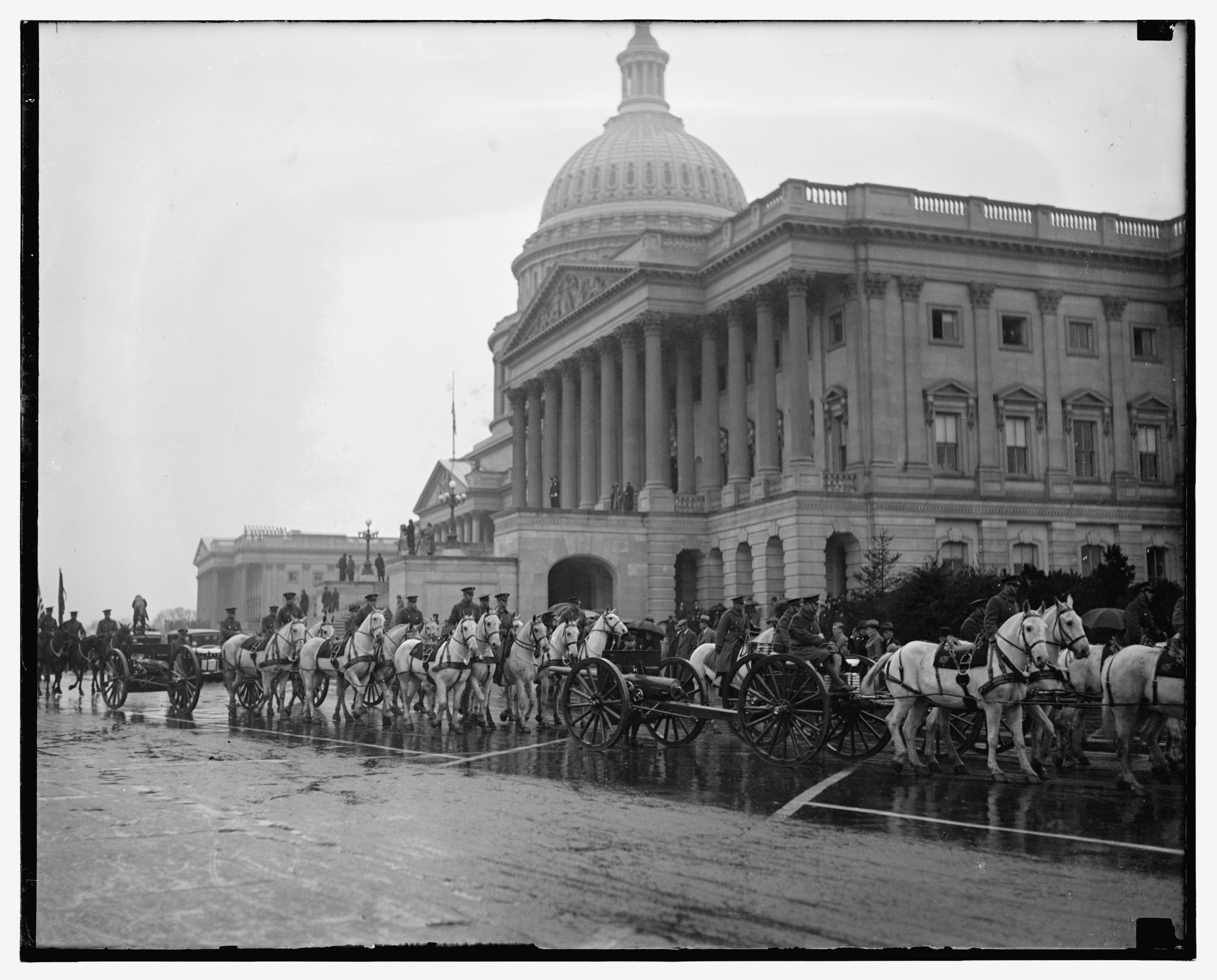
A horse drawn caisson transporting the remains of William Howard Taft from the Capitol to All Souls Church, Unitarian on March 11, 1930.

Former president William Howard Taft, also retired Chief Justice of the United States, was given a state funeral in Washington, D.C., on March 11, 1930, three days after his death. He lay in state in the Capitol rotunda and a funeral service was held at All Souls' Unitarian Church. Herbert Hoover had offered the East Room in the White House for the service. However, the president's widow, Helen Taft, decided that it would be more appropriate at the church of which the president was a member. Justices of the United States Supreme Court acted as honorary pallbearers.

===== Franklin D. Roosevelt =====
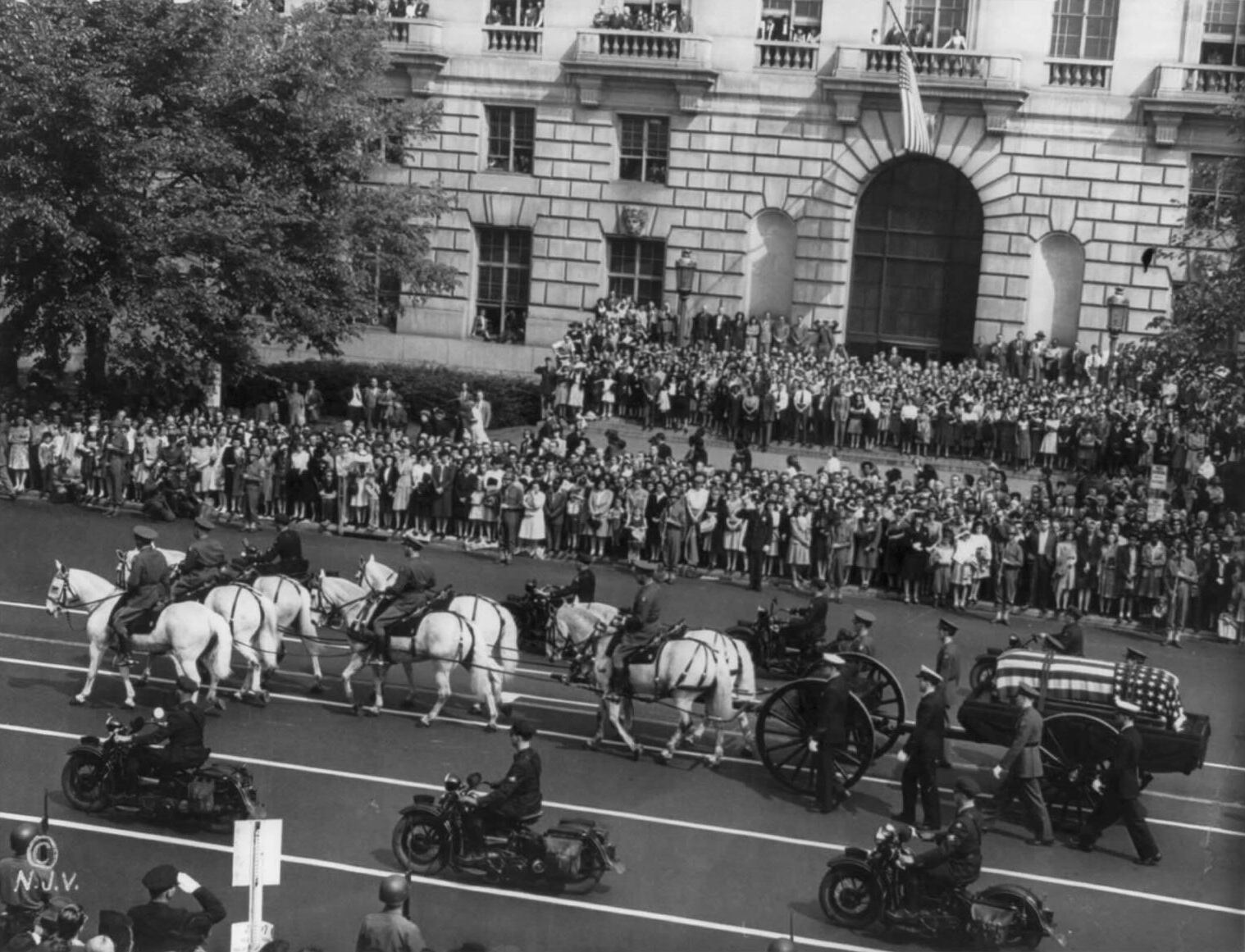
On April 14, 1945, a horse-drawn caisson transported the casket of Franklin D. Roosevelt on Pennsylvania Avenue en route to Washington Union Station.

Franklin D. Roosevelt died on April 12, 1945, in Warm Springs, Georgia, early into his fourth term. Due to ongoing participation of the United States in World War II, it was decided that he would not be accorded a state funeral, as any public display of ceremonial pomp during a time of war was deemed inappropriate while American G.I.s were dying overseas.

However, many Americans flocked to the train tracks to witness the funeral train from Warm Springs to Washington. His body lay in repose in the East Room of the White House. A private funeral service was conducted there; only family members, close friends, high government officials, members of both chambers of the Congress, and heads of foreign missions attended. Though there was no lying in state in the Capitol rotunda, flags were lowered to half-staff at the White House and the Capitol.

After private funeral services were held in Washington, D.C., Roosevelt's remains were transported on a funeral train to his Hyde Park, New York residence, Springwood Estate, for interment.

===== John F. Kennedy =====
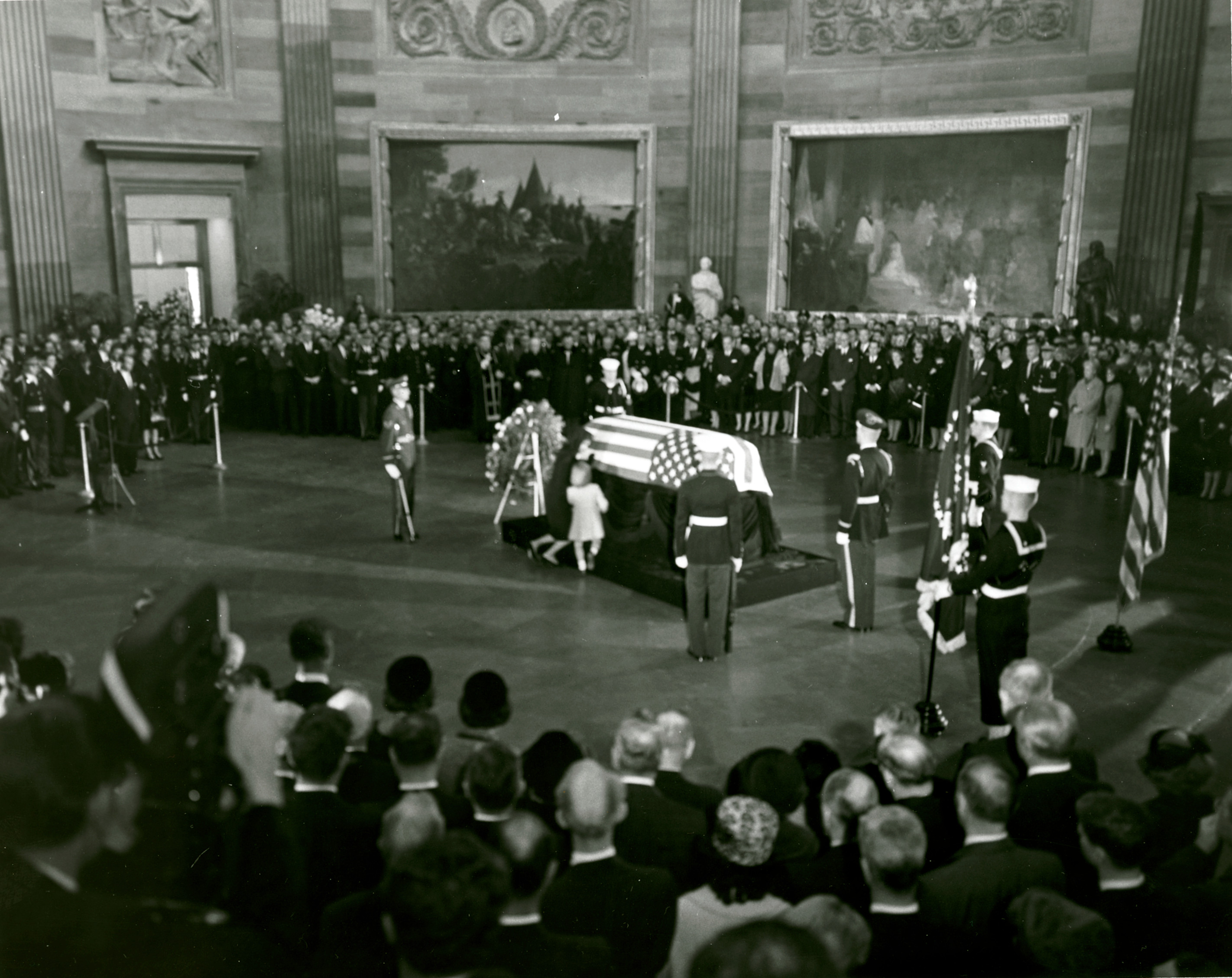
Kennedy is lying in state in the United States Capitol Rotunda on November 24, 1963

John F. Kennedy was assassinated on November 22, 1963, in Dallas, Texas. The state funeral was the first in the television age, covered live from start to finish, nonstop for 70 hours.

Kennedy's body was brought back to Washington after his assassination. Early on November 23, six military pallbearers carried the flag-draped coffin into the East Room of the White House, where he lay in repose for 24 hours. Then, the coffin was carried on a horse-drawn caisson to the Capitol to lie in state. Throughout the day and night, hundreds of thousands lined up to view the guarded casket, with a quarter million passing through the rotunda during the 18 hours of lying in state.

Kennedy's funeral service was held on November 25 at St. Matthew's Cathedral. The Requiem Mass was led by Cardinal Richard Cushing. About 1,200 guests, including representatives from over 90 countries, attended. After the service, Kennedy was buried at Arlington National Cemetery in Virginia.

===== Herbert Hoover =====
Dying in his suite at the Waldorf-Astoria Hotel in New York City on October 20, 1964, Herbert Hoover had made plans in 1958 for a state funeral. Accorded with full military honors, over 70 soldiers from the First Army at Fort Jay on Governors Island in the city as guards of honor during the funeral service held at St. Bartholomew's Episcopal Church on October 22. When Hoover's casket arrived in Washington, D.C., on October 23, his remains lay in state in the Capitol rotunda for two days before they were flown to West Branch, Iowa, for interment.

===== Dwight D. Eisenhower =====
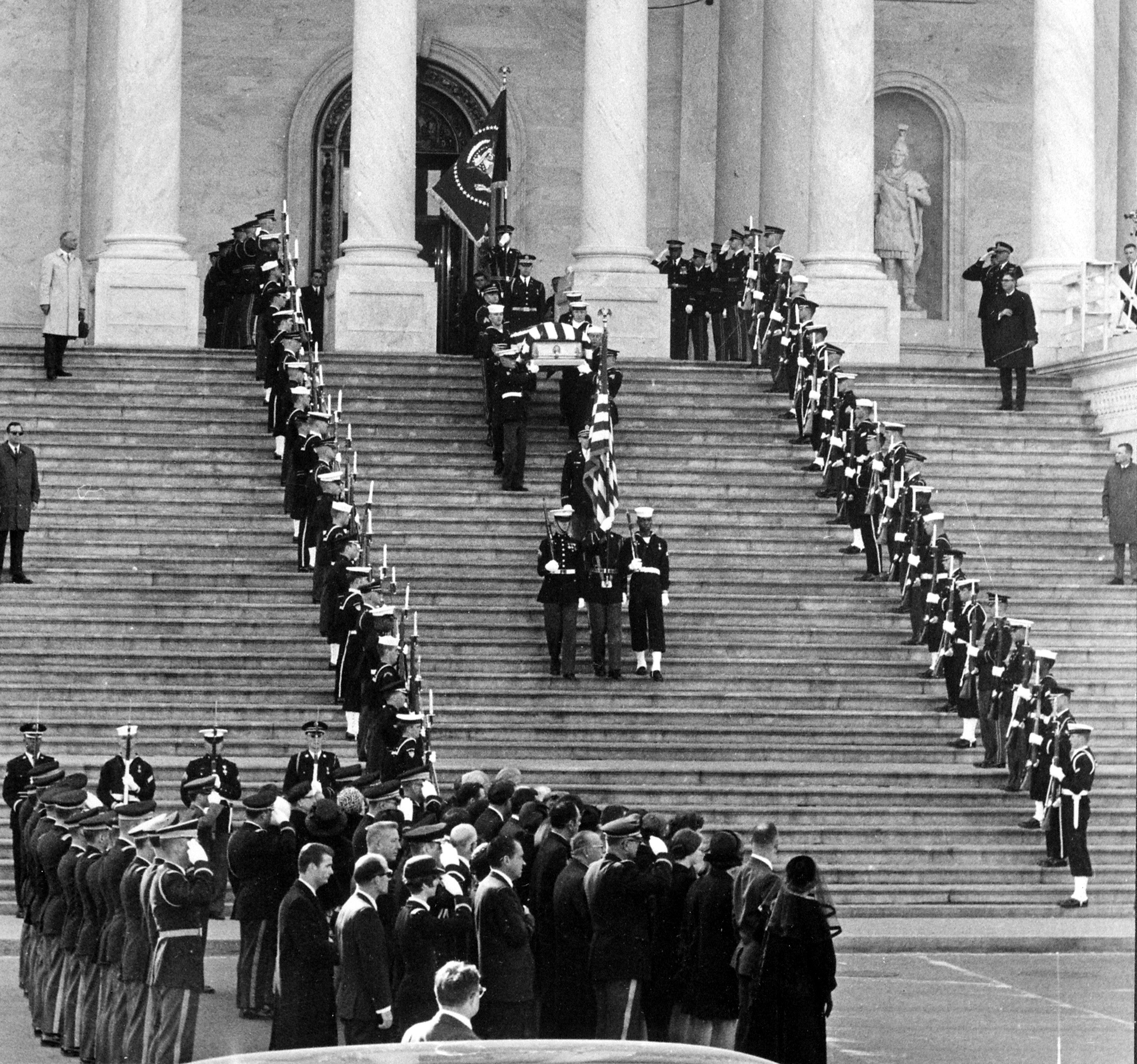
A guard of honor carrying the remains of Dwight D. Eisenhower down the center steps on the east front of the Capitol on March 31, 1969.

The state funeral for former president Dwight D. Eisenhower, who died on March 28, 1969, placed a strong emphasis on military rites in honor of Eisenhower's contribution as Supreme Allied Commander during World War II. Ceremonial and religious aspects also called for flags to be lowered to half-staff for 30 days, a lying in state in the Capitol rotunda, as well as a religious service held at Washington National Cathedral.

===== Lyndon B. Johnson =====
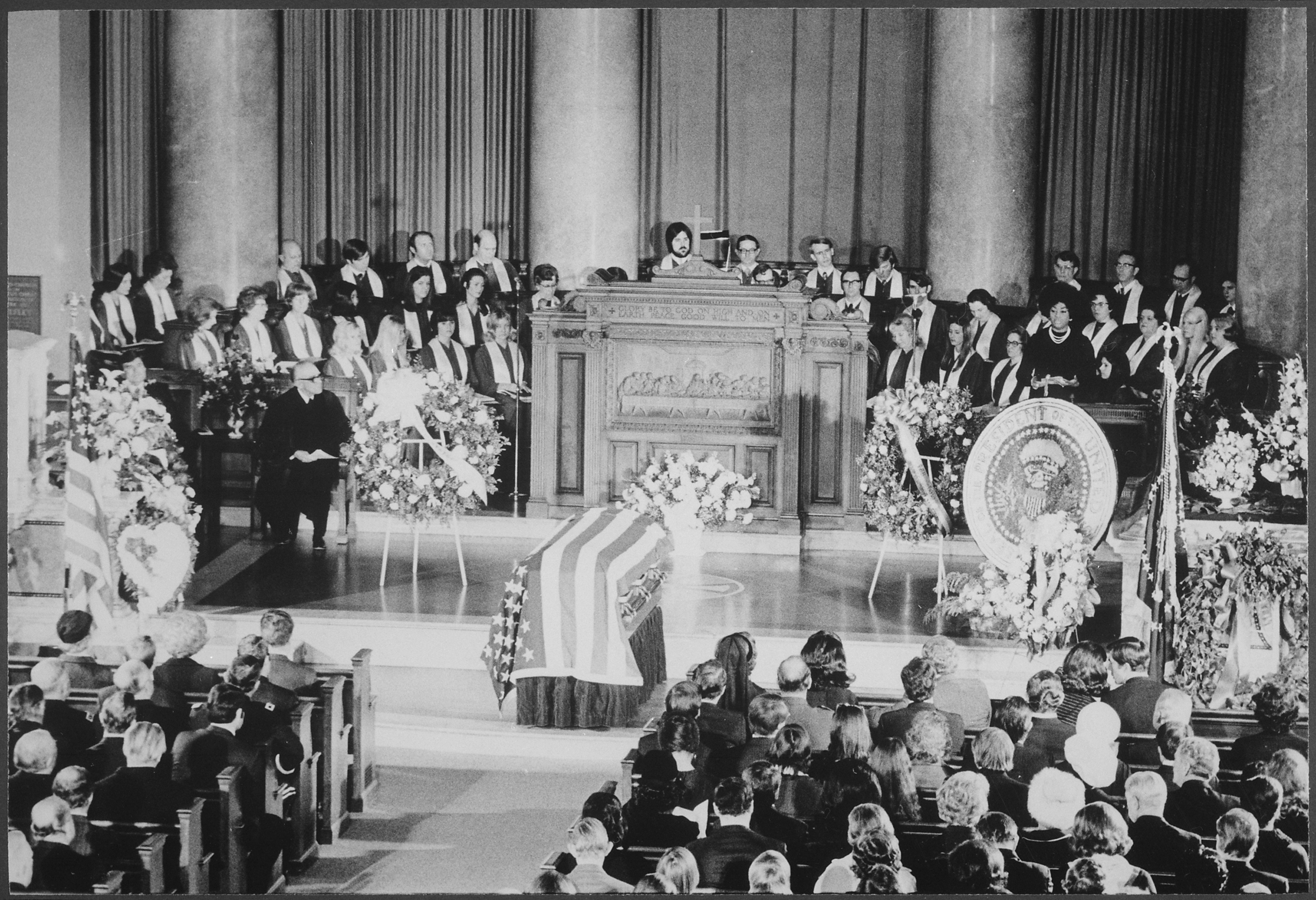
The funeral service of Lyndon B. Johnson held at National City Christian Church in Washington, D.C., on January 24, 1973.

On January 22, 1973, Lyndon B. Johnson died of a heart attack. Johnson's state funeral overlapped the mourning period of another former president, Harry S. Truman, who had died one month earlier (on December 26).

Johnson lay in state for two days in the Capitol rotunda, the United States Air Force performed a flyover during the funeral procession to the Capitol, and flags were lowered to half-staff for 30 days as had been observed for Truman. The Johnson family stayed at Blair House during the state funeral. After funeral services were held at National City Christian Church on January 25, the Johnsons flew back to Texas where interment later that afternoon occurred at the Johnson ranch in Stonewall, Texas.

==== State funerals in the 21st century ====
===== Ronald Reagan =====
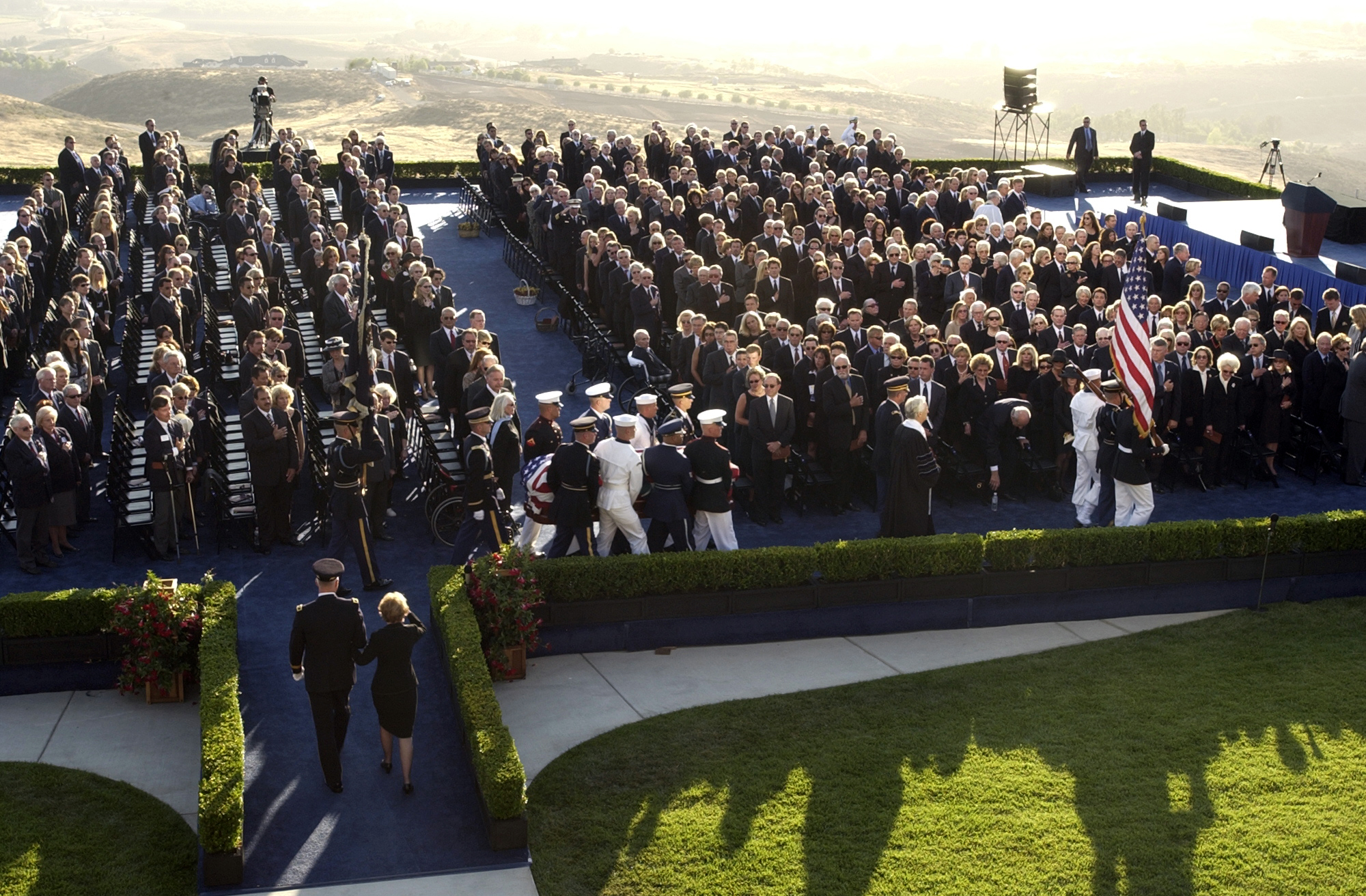
A guard of honor moving the casket of Ronald Reagan prior to interment at the Ronald Reagan Presidential Library in Simi Valley, California, on June 11, 2004.

Ronald Reagan died on June 5, 2004, in Los Angeles, California, from complications of Alzheimer's disease. His state funeral occurred in Washington, D.C., and Simi Valley, California, where Reagan was interred at the Ronald Reagan Presidential Library. 200,000 mourners (5,000 per hour) filed past Reagan's casket in the Capitol rotunda June 9–11, 2004. Over two dozen world leaders listened to eulogies given by President George W. Bush, Mayor Anthony A. Williams, former Canadian Prime Minister Brian Mulroney and former British Prime Minister Margaret Thatcher during a national funeral service held at Washington National Cathedral.

===== Gerald Ford =====
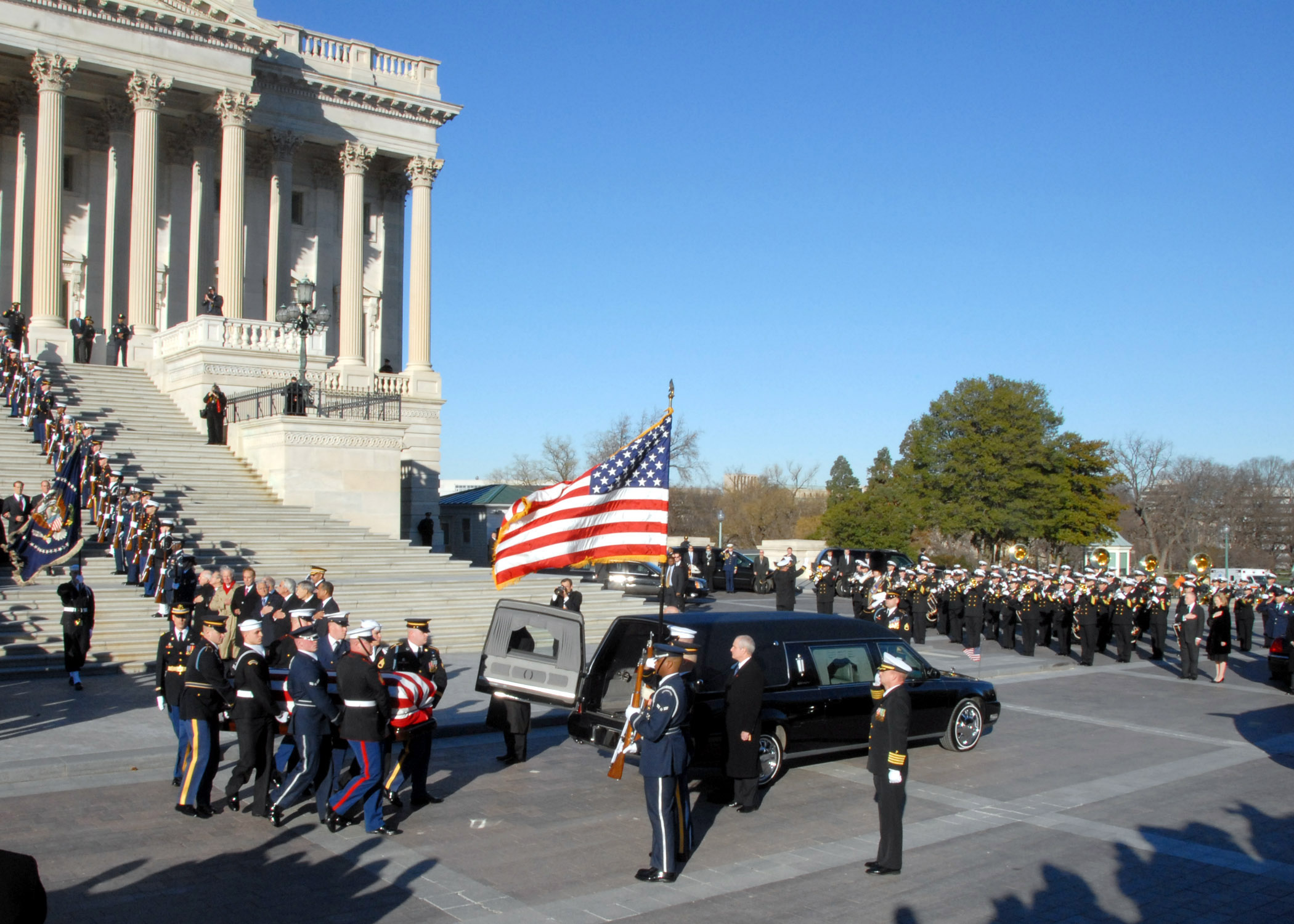
A guard of honor carries the casket of Gerald Ford down the east steps of the U.S. Capitol on January 2, 2007.

Gerald Ford died on December 26, 2006, of arteriosclerotic cerebrovascular disease and diffuse arteriosclerosis. His state funeral was held in Palm Desert, California, Washington, D.C., and Grand Rapids, Michigan. Eulogies were given at Washington National Cathedral by former Presidents George H. W. Bush and Jimmy Carter, former Secretary of State Henry Kissinger, journalist Tom Brokaw, and sitting President George W. Bush. Ford's remains were then flown to Michigan, where he lay in repose at the Gerald R. Ford Presidential Museum in Grand Rapids. On January 3, Ford's remains was taken by motorcade to Grace Episcopal Church in East Grand Rapids, where a private funeral service was conducted. After the service, Ford's remains were transported back to the museum for interment.

===== George H. W. Bush =====
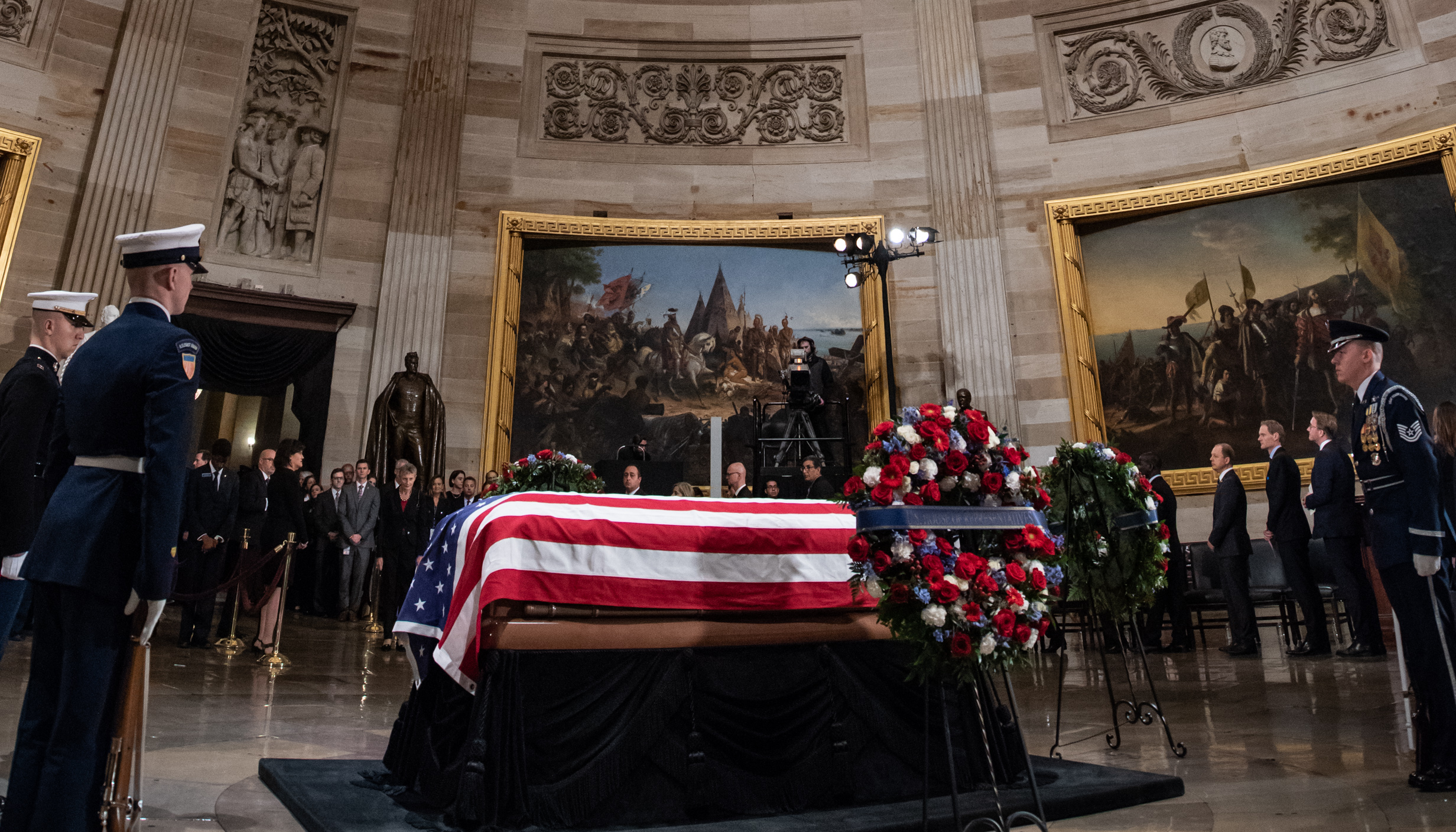
George H. W. Bush lying in state in the United States Capitol rotunda on December 3, 2018

George H. W. Bush died on November 30, 2018, in Houston, Texas, from complications of Parkinson’s Disease. His state funeral commenced on December 3, when Bush's remains were transported from Texas to Washington, D.C. There he lay in state in the Capitol rotunda until the morning of December 5. On December 5, a funeral service was held at Washington National Cathedral with eulogies delivered by Bush's son and former president, George W. Bush, former Canadian Prime Minister Brian Mulroney, former Senator Alan Simpson, and historian and author Jon Meacham. President Donald Trump along with former presidents Barack Obama, Bill Clinton, and Jimmy Carter were also present, as were foreign heads of state and government. Afterwards, Bush was flown back to Texas where his remains lay in repose and a private funeral service was conducted at St. Martin’s Episcopal Church in Houston on December 6. Interment occurred later that day at the George Bush Presidential Library in College Station, Texas.

===== Jimmy Carter =====
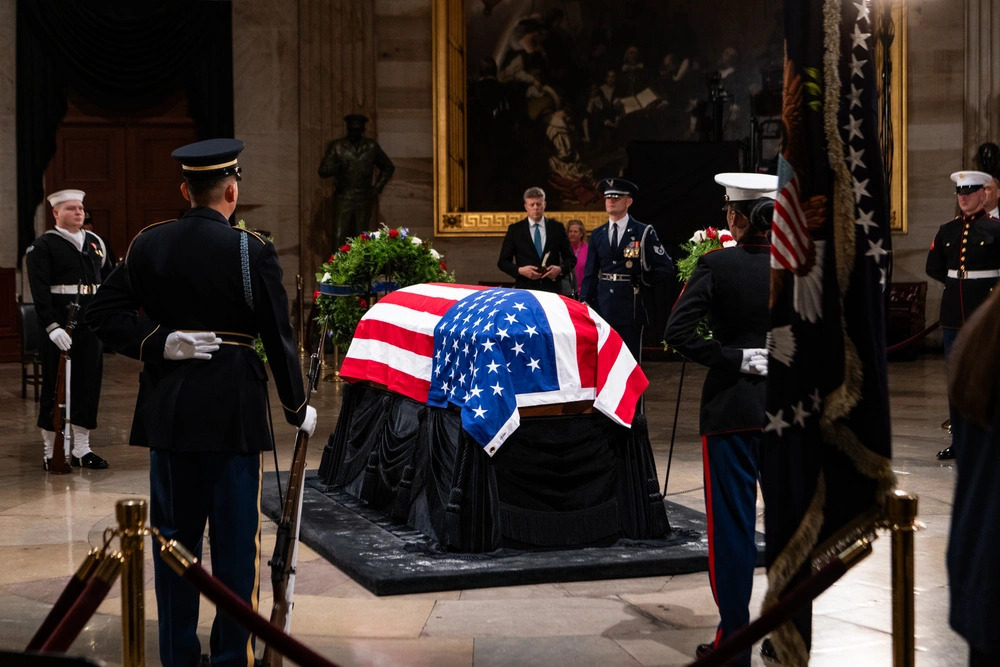
Carter's casket lies in state in the United States Capitol Rotunda

Jimmy Carter died at his home in Plains, Georgia, on December 29, 2024, at the age of 100. This followed his decision in February 2023 to enter hospice care, after being diagnosed with melanoma in 2015 that metastasized to his brain and liver. His state funeral was held in Georgia and in Washington, D.C. on January 4–9, 2025. He lay in repose at the Carter Center, in Atlanta, Georgia, from January 4 to 7. In Washington, D.C., he lay in state in the Capitol Rotunda from January 7 to 9. Washington National Cathedral hosted the state funeral service on January 9, 2025, In addition to President Joe Biden, Vice President Kamala Harris, and their spouses, attendants included former Presidents Bill Clinton, George W. Bush, Barack Obama, and Donald Trump. Also in attendance were several foreign dignitaries, among them: Prime Minister Justin Trudeau of Canada and Secretary General of the United Nations Antonio Guterres. President Biden delivered the main eulogy. Later that same day, a private funeral service with his family and close friends was held at Maranatha Baptist Church in Plains, Georgia. Interment took place afterward at the Jimmy Carter National Historical Park in Plains.

=== Other presidential funerals outside of Washington ===
==== Ulysses S. Grant ====
Ulysses S. Grant died on July 23, 1885, after a battle with throat cancer that had been extensively covered by the press. His funeral was held August 8, 1885, in New York, featuring a funeral procession of 60,000 men as well as a 30-day, nationwide period of mourning. President Grover Cleveland, all the living former presidents, the cabinet, and supreme court justices attended. People who eulogized him likened him to George Washington and Abraham Lincoln, then the nation's two greatest heroes.

==== Richard Nixon ====
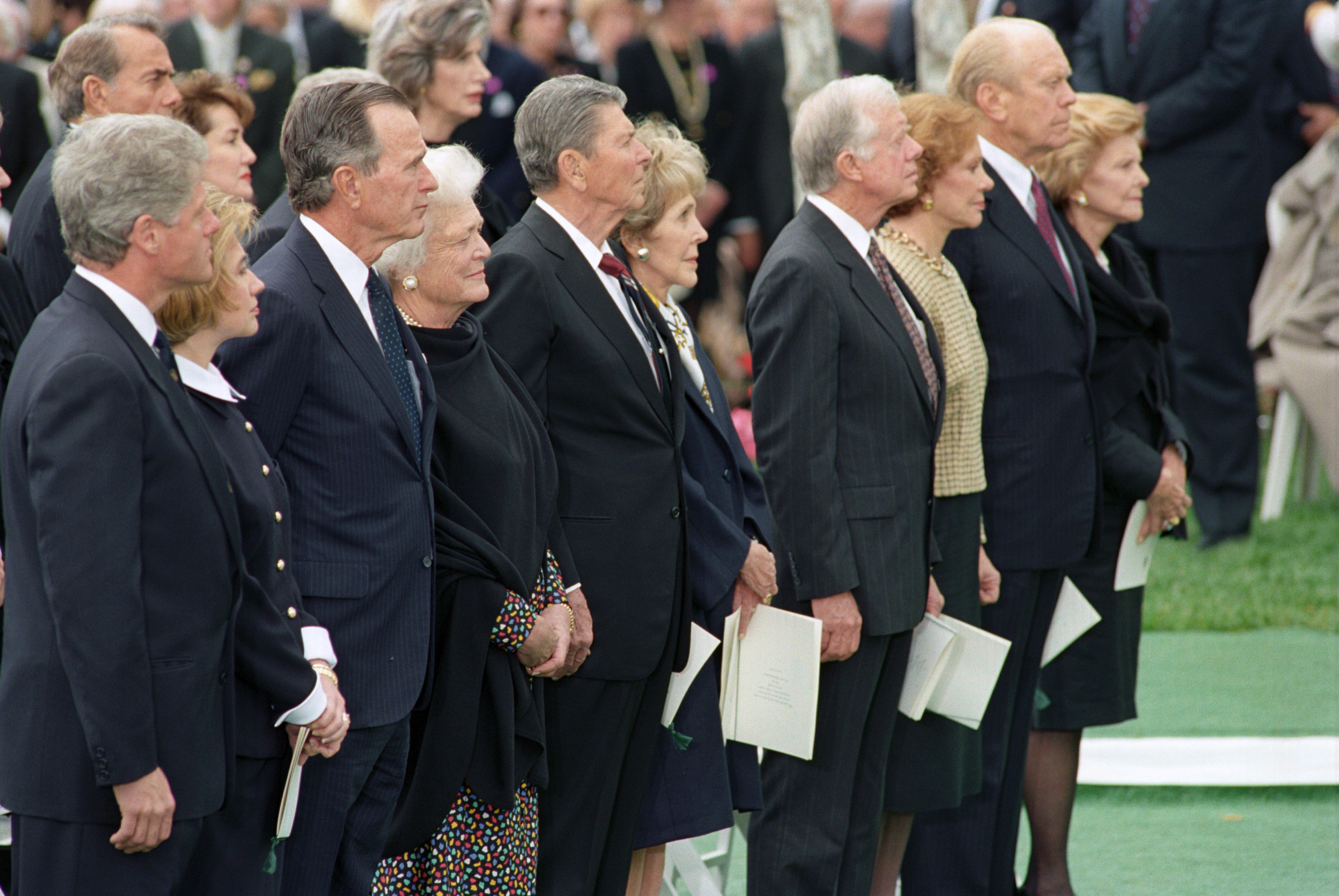
The funeral service of Richard Nixon was attended by President Bill Clinton, former Presidents George H. W. Bush, Ronald Reagan, Jimmy Carter, Gerald Ford and their wives on April 27, 1994, at the Richard Nixon Presidential Library and Museum.

On April 18, 1994, Richard Nixon suffered a stroke in his Park Ridge, New Jersey home and died four days later at New York Hospital–Cornell Medical Center in Manhattan. Despite being a former president eligible for the honor of a full state funeral, in keeping with Nixon’s expressed personal wishes prior to his death, his family opted for a subdued funeral service on the grounds of the Richard Nixon Presidential Library and Museum in Yorba Linda, California. Consensus was held by members of the Nixon family that had any events occurred at the Capitol, visitors might not be respectful towards the memory of Nixon. After his death, Nixon’s remains were flown to California in an Air Force jet where his body lay in repose at his presidential library from the morning of April 26 until his funeral service the following day. An estimated 42,000 people passed by Nixon’s casket in order to pay their respects. Eulogies were delivered by President Bill Clinton, former Secretary of State Henry Kissinger, Senator Bob Dole, California Governor Pete Wilson, and Reverend Billy Graham. Also in attendance were former Presidents Gerald Ford, Jimmy Carter, Ronald Reagan, George H. W. Bush, and their wives. After the funeral service concluded, Nixon was buried beside his wife Pat, who died ten months earlier.

=== History of non-presidential state funerals ===
==== Thaddeus Stevens ====
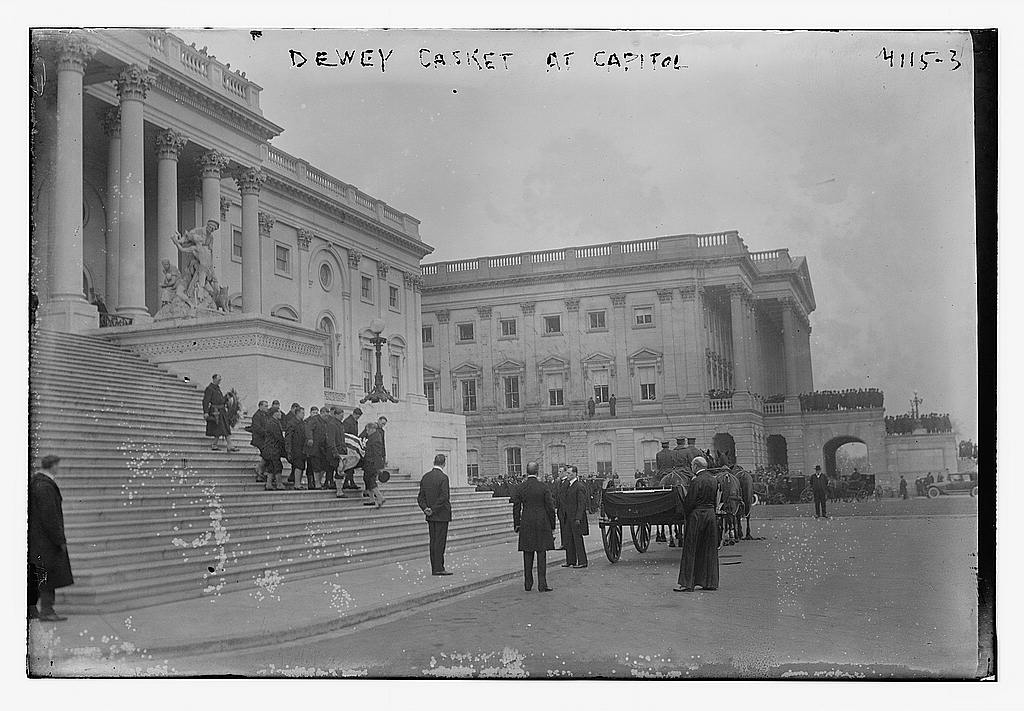
The casket bearing the remains of George Dewey, the only person to attain the rank of Admiral of the Navy in recognition of his 1898 naval victory at the Battle of Manila Bay during the Spanish–American War, was carried by honor guards down the center steps at the Capitol on January 20, 1917.

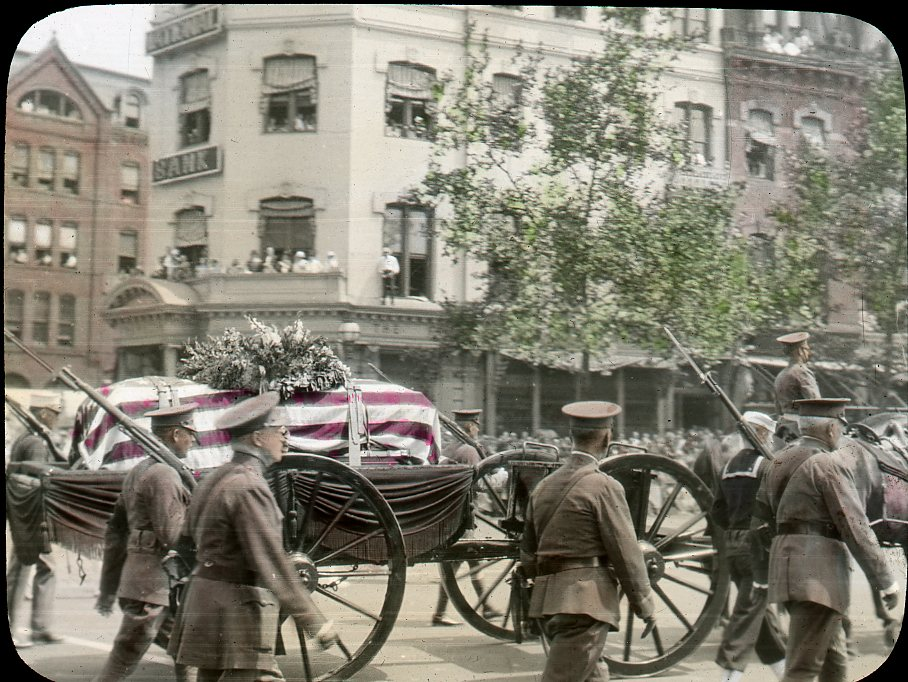
The funeral procession on Pennsylvania Avenue for the unknown soldier of World War I in Washington, D.C., on November 11, 1921.

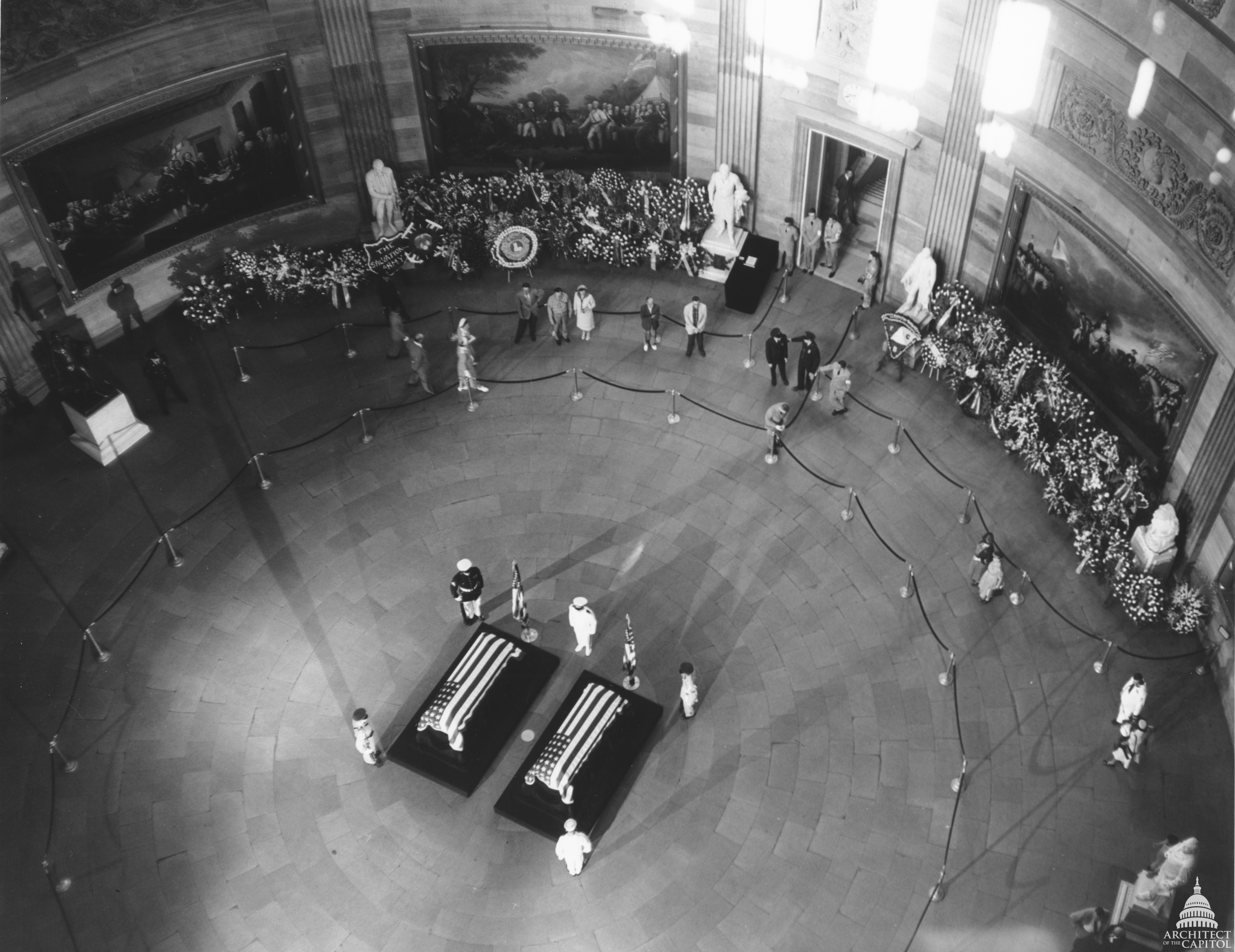
Two unknown soldiers who gave their lives serving overseas in the Armed Forces during World War II and the Korean War lay in state in the Capitol rotunda, May 28–30, 1958.

The first non-presidential state funeral was for Rep. Thaddeus Stevens in 1868. When Stevens died on August 11, mourners came to his home in Washington, D.C., to pay their respects, including U.S. Senator Charles Sumner of Massachusetts. Stevens's remains were transported by a cavalry regiment to the Capitol where he lay in state in the rotunda on August 13, 1868, until the morning of August 14. After a short funeral service, Stevens's remains were taken to Lancaster, Pennsylvania, for interment.

The Unknown Soldier

In 1921, a state funeral was conducted for the Unknown Soldier of World War I. The idea of honoring the unknown dead of World War I originated in Europe, the first being the United Kingdom and France on November 11, 1920. Other nations such as Italy soon followed this custom. At first, the idea of honoring a fallen and unknown soldier from World War I was met with resistance in the United States since there was no established place for burial of a fallen soldier similar to Westminster Abbey in London or the Arc de Triomphe in Paris. In addition, all American servicemen who fought in the war were in the process of being identified and accounted for by the Army Graves Registration, unlike the British and French who had many unknown dead. By 1920, a resolution in Congress was proposed for such an honor and by March 4, 1921, Public Resolution 67 was approved by the 66th United States Congress for the construction of the tomb of the unknown soldier at Arlington National Cemetery. Congress on October 20, 1921, declared November 11, 1921, the third anniversary of Armistice Day, a legal holiday. The War Department then began a selection process of an unknown soldier. Four bodies were exhumed from four cemeteries; Aisne-Marne American Cemetery and Memorial, Meuse-Argonne American Cemetery and Memorial, Somme American Cemetery and Memorial, and St. Mihiel American Cemetery and Memorial in France. During the selection ceremony at Châlons-sur-Marne, it was Edward F. Younger of Headquarters Company, 2nd Battalion, 50th Infantry, American Forces in Germany who selected the third casket from left that contained an unknown soldier to be honored with a state funeral in Washington D C. and for burial at Arlington. In Washington, D.C., the unknown soldier was escorted to the Capitol in a funeral procession on November 9. With lying in state occurring in the rotunda, some 90,000 people on November 9–10 filed past the casket that rested on the Lincoln Catafalque. A funeral service was conducted at the Arlington Memorial Amphitheater in the presence of President Warren G. Harding. Interment and burial of the unknown soldier with military rites took place at the newly constructed tomb.

==== Joseph T. Robinson ====
The funeral of former Senate Majority Leader Joseph T. Robinson which was held in the U.S. Senate chamber on July 16, 1937 has been regarded as a state funeral.

==== John J. Pershing ====
On July 15, 1948, General of the Armies John J. Pershing died at Walter Reed Army Hospital. Initially, plans for a state funeral were drawn up ten years earlier when it seemed that the general was near death. The plan was kept a closely guarded secret and during those ten years, Pershing's funeral was revised. As a military man and as one of the highest ranking commissioned officers in the United States Army, Pershing insisted that his state funeral be a military one. His remains lay in repose in the chapel at Walter Reed Army Hospital. During the state funeral scheduled for July 17–19, 1948, the public would be admitted to view Pershing lying in state in the Capitol rotunda and a funeral procession from the Capitol to Arlington National Cemetery would occur. A funeral service was held at the Memorial Amphitheatre and interment was given with military rites at the gravesite in Arlington National Cemetery. A proposal to posthumously award Pershing a six-star rank was swiftly dropped in favor of the four-star rank that the general attained in his military career.

==== The Unknown Soldiers of World War II and the Korean War ====
Like the Unknown Soldier of World War I it was decided in June 1946 by the 79th United States Congress that a state funeral and burial in Arlington National Cemetery would be given to an unknown soldier after the end of World War II. However, the selection process would be simplified—an unidentified serviceman was to be chosen from each of the following: the European area, the Far East area, the Mediterranean zone, the Pacific area, the former Africa-Middle East zone now part of the Mediterranean zone, and the Alaskan Command chosen by one of five representatives of the Army, Navy, Air Force, Marine Corps, and Coast Guard, each of whom had received the highest award of his service during World War II. Plans for a state funeral was to occur between May 27–30, 1950, but this was shelved because of the outbreak of the Korean War. Interest though was revived in August 1955 long after the war concluded and on August 2, 1956, the 84th United States Congress enacted Public Law 975 that authorized the burial of an unknown soldier of the Korean War in addition to the unknown soldier of World War II. The two caskets bearing the remains of the two unknown soldiers rested atop two catafalques in the Capitol rotunda. Lying in state occurred from May 28–30, 1958. A funeral procession of two horse-drawn caissons traveled from the Capitol on Constitution Avenue, 23rd Street, Arlington Memorial Bridge, and Memorial Drive to Arlington National Cemetery. As the funeral cortege reached the Memorial Gate, twenty jet fighters and bombers passed overhead with one plane missing from each formation. A funeral service was held at the Memorial Amphitheatre attended by President Dwight D. Eisenhower, Vice President Richard Nixon, and members of Congress. A burial service conducted with military rites included a three-volley salute, the playing of Taps, and the folding of flags. It is estimated that over 4,800 members of the Armed Forces participated in the state funeral of the unknown soldiers of World War II and the Korean War.

==== Douglas MacArthur ====
A state funeral was held for General of the Army Douglas MacArthur in 1964. President John F. Kennedy had authorized a state funeral for MacArthur and President Lyndon B. Johnson confirmed Kennedy's directive. Funeral plans drawn up in 1958 called for seven days rather than four days of ceremonial events. When MacArthur died on April 5, 1964, at Walter Reed Army Hospital, his remains were transported to New York City, where he lay in repose at the Seventh Regiment Armory. Mounted city police from the New York City Police Department, soldiers from the First Army, and cadets from the United States Military Academy participated in the funeral procession on Park Avenue, 66th Street, 57th Street, Fifth Avenue, Broadway and Seventh Avenue en route to Pennsylvania Station. A funeral train transported MacArthur's remains from New York to Washington Union Station in Washington, D.C. A funeral procession on both Pennsylvania and Constitution Avenues using a horse-drawn caisson took the General's remains to the Capitol for lying in state. Over the course of two days, April 8–9, over 150,000 people filed past MacArthur's casket in the Capitol rotunda. A third funeral procession occurred on Constitution Avenue that included a flyover of fifty Air Force planes over the column in salute as the horse-drawn caisson neared the site of the casket transfer to a hearse. MacArthur's remains were then transported to Washington National Airport and flown to Naval Station Norfolk on a Lockheed C-130 Hercules. A fourth funeral procession occurred in the streets of Norfolk, stopping at the MacArthur Memorial where lying in repose occurred in the rotunda from April 9–11. After a religious service was held at St. Paul's Episcopal Church on April 11 in Norfolk for an invited 400 guests, a fifth and final horse-drawn procession back to the MacArthur Memorial occurred. A three-volley salute, the folding of the flag, and a 19-gun salute accorded to a five-star rank of general, which MacArthur possessed, was fired before burial in a crypt.

==== Neil Armstrong ====
On August 25, 2012, Apollo 11 astronaut Neil Armstrong, the first person to walk on the Moon, died after complications from coronary artery bypass surgery. Congressman Bill Johnson from Armstrong's home state of Ohio, led calls for President Barack Obama to authorize a state funeral in Washington, D.C. Throughout his lifetime, Armstrong shunned publicity and rarely gave interviews. Mindful that Armstrong would have objected to a state funeral, his family opted to have a private funeral in Cincinnati. His remains were scattered in the Atlantic Ocean during a burial-at-sea ceremony on September 14, 2012, aboard the USS Philippine Sea.

==== Ruth Bader Ginsburg ====
The most recent non-presidential state funeral was held for U.S. Supreme Court associate justice Ruth Bader Ginsburg, who died on September 18, 2020. She was the first woman and first Jewish person to be accorded this honor.

=== Presidential places of burial ===
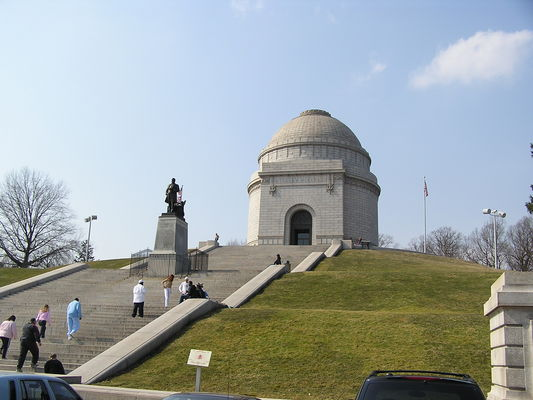
The McKinley National Memorial located in Canton, Ohio, where the remains of William McKinley were interred in 1907.

Many presidents have been interred in cemeteries, tombs, crypts, vaults, in the grounds at a place of residence, and inside cathedrals. Some examples include the following. The remains of George Washington were interred in a tomb at his Virginia plantation, Mount Vernon, in 1799. After falling into disrepair as well as grave robbers attempting to steal the remains of Washington, a new and more secure vault was constructed at Mount Vernon in 1831. Thomas Jefferson was interred at the Monticello Graveyard in the grounds of his Virginia plantation, Monticello, in 1826. The remains of Abraham Lincoln were exhumed and moved a total of seventeen times, the first exhumation occurring in 1865, before the ornate and lavish Lincoln Tomb was finally built for final interment in 1901 at Oak Ridge Cemetery located in Springfield, Illinois. Ulysses S. Grant, who died in 1885, was interred in Riverside Park in New York City where eventually, the construction of Grant's Tomb housing the former president's remains was finally completed and dedicated in 1897. The remains of Woodrow Wilson were interred in a sarcophagus inside Washington National Cathedral in 1924. In 1933 Calvin Coolidge was interred with minimal ceremony in the village cemetery in Plymouth Notch, Vermont, becoming the last president to be buried in a public cemetery. William Howard Taft and John F. Kennedy were interred at Arlington National Cemetery in the years 1930 and 1963 respectively.

Many presidents in recent years have been interred at their presidential libraries around the nation. Examples include Ronald Reagan, whose remains are interred at the Ronald Reagan Presidential Library in Simi Valley, California, Gerald Ford, whose remains are located at the Gerald R. Ford Presidential Museum in Grand Rapids, Michigan, and George H. W. Bush, whose remains are interred at the George Bush Presidential Library in College Station, Texas.

== Major components ==
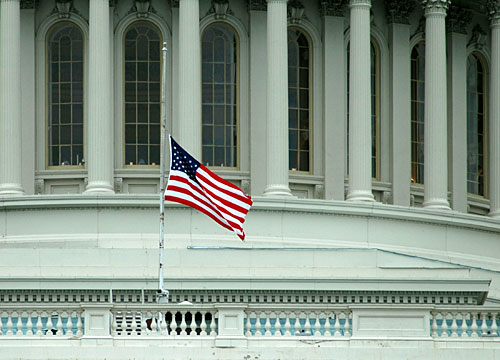
The U.S. flag flying at half-staff on the Capitol during Ronald Reagan's state funeral, June 2004.

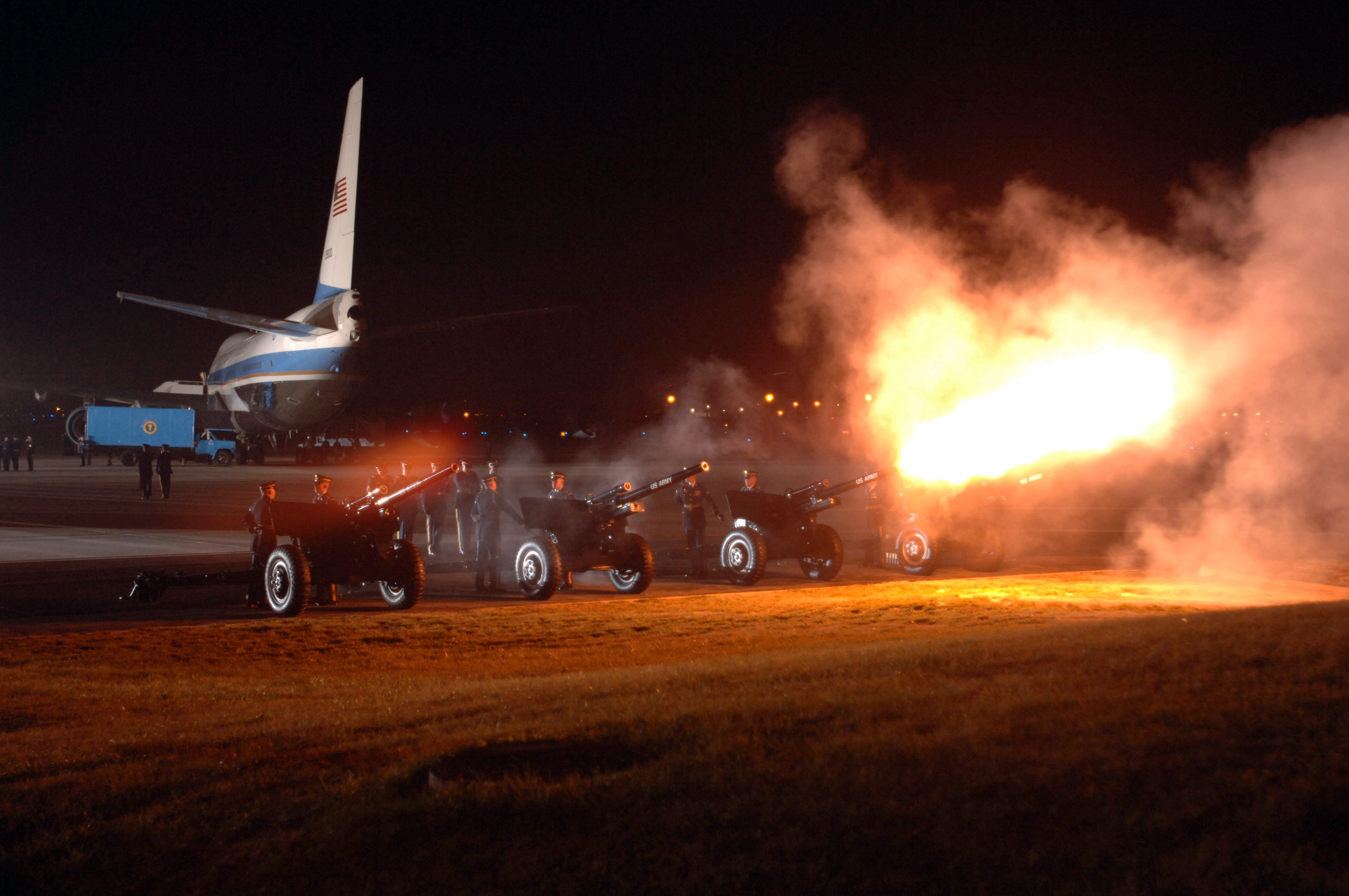
The Presidential Salute Battery, 3rd United States Infantry Regiment "The Old Guard" firing a 21-gun salute for Gerald Ford during an evening arrival ceremony held at Andrews Air Force Base on December 30, 2006.

In the United States, a sitting president while in office will immediately issue a presidential proclamation allowing for the flag of the United States to be flown at half-staff upon the death of principal figures in the federal government, such as a former president, and others, as a mark of respect to their memory. When such a proclamation is issued, all government buildings, offices, public schools and military bases are to fly their flags at half-staff. Under federal law (4 U.S.C. § 7(f)), the flags of states, cities, localities, and pennants of societies, shall never be placed above the flag of the United States. Thus, all other flags also fly at half-staff when the flag of the United States has been ordered to fly at half-staff. Protocol dictates that flags will be flown at half-staff for a period of thirty days for a former president, beginning at the time a presidential proclamation is made effective. At the discretion of the sitting president, he will also issue an executive order which authorizes the closure of all federal departments, agencies, and buildings on a national day of mourning during a state funeral.

On the day after the death of a president, a former president, or a president-elect unless the day falls on a Sunday or holiday, in which case the honor will be rendered the following day, the commanders of Army installations with the necessary personnel and material traditionally order that one gun be fired every half hour, beginning at reveille and ending at retreat. On the day of interment for a president, a 21-gun salute traditionally is fired starting at noon at all military installations with the necessary personnel and material. Guns will be fired at one-minute intervals. Also on the day of interment, those installations will fire a 50-gun salute with one round for each of the 50 U.S. states and at five-second intervals immediately following a lowering of the flag. 19-gun salutes are reserved for deputy heads of state, chiefs of staff, cabinet members, and 5-star generals. For each flag rank junior to a five-star officer, two guns are subtracted.

The commanding general of the Joint Force Headquarters National Capital Region will act as a military escort for the president's family from the time of the official announcement of death until interment occurs. Two examples of this role was by Major General Galen B. Jackman who escorted former First Lady Nancy Reagan during the state funeral of Ronald Reagan in 2004 and Lieutenant General Guy C. Swan III who escorted former First Lady Betty Ford during the state funeral of Gerald Ford in 2006–07.

Most state funerals include a nine-person honor guard acting as pallbearers (also known as body bearers) from all six branches of the Armed Forces, a series of gun salutes using cannons from the Presidential Salute Battery of the 3rd United States Infantry Regiment "The Old Guard", flyovers in missing man formation, various musical selections performed by military bands and choirs, a military chaplain for the immediate family, and a flag-draped casket or pall.

Sitting presidents who die while in office may lie in repose in the East Room of the White House. Former presidents may lie in repose in their home or adopted state, usually at their presidential library, before traveling to Washington, D.C., when thereafter, lying in state in the United States Capitol Rotunda will occur. Dwight D. Eisenhower was an exception to this general rule. Following his death at Walter Reed Army Hospital in 1969, Eisenhower lay in repose in the Bethlehem Chapel at Washington National Cathedral for 28 hours, rather than at his presidential library in Abilene, Kansas.

=== Funeral procession ===
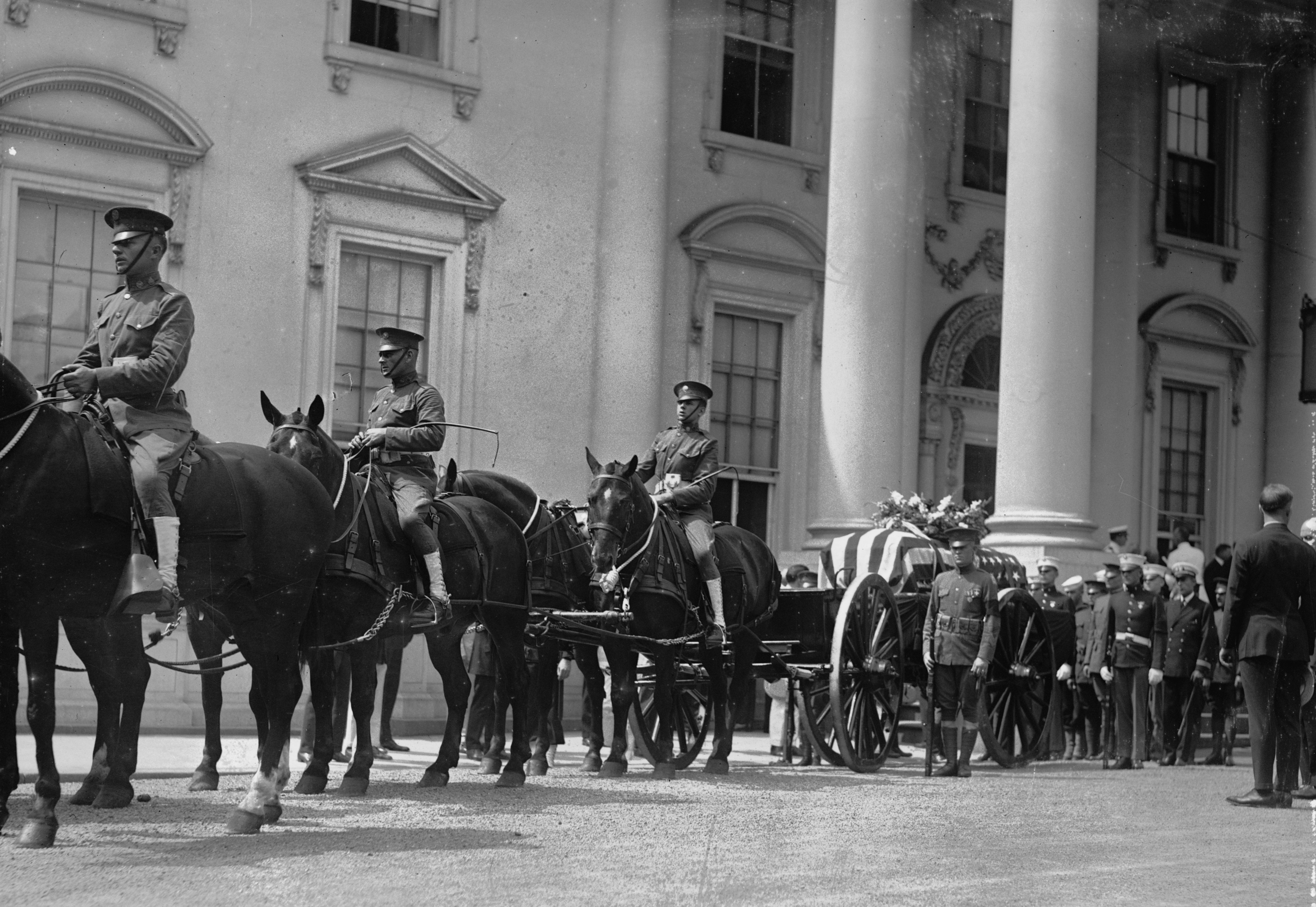
A horse-drawn caisson transporting the casket of Warren G. Harding in front of the North Portico entrance of the White House, August 1923.

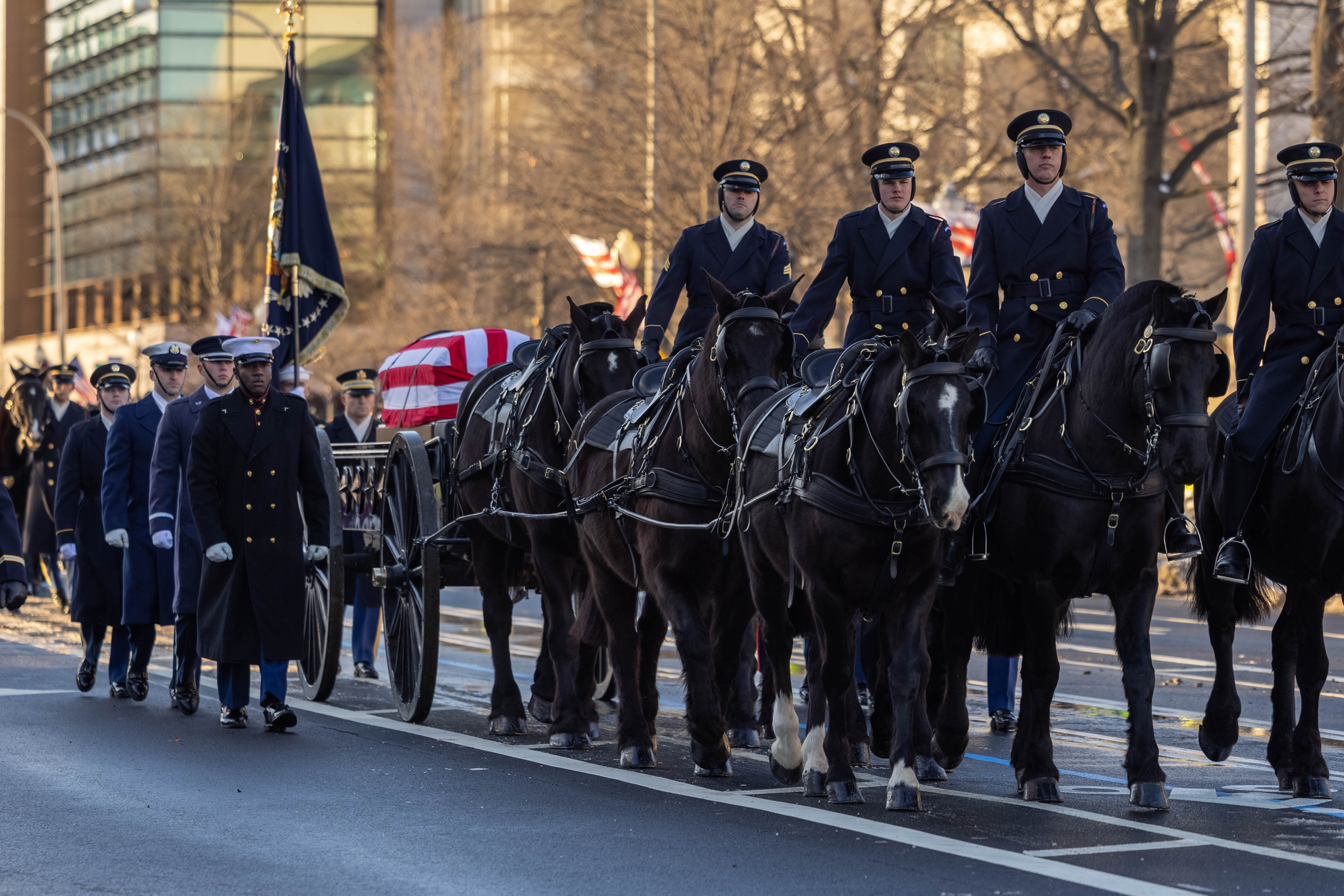
The coffin carrying Jimmy Carter's body is transported by the caisson platoon of the U.S. Army's presidential escort regiment on Pennsylvania Avenue to the U.S. Capitol. on January 7, 2025.

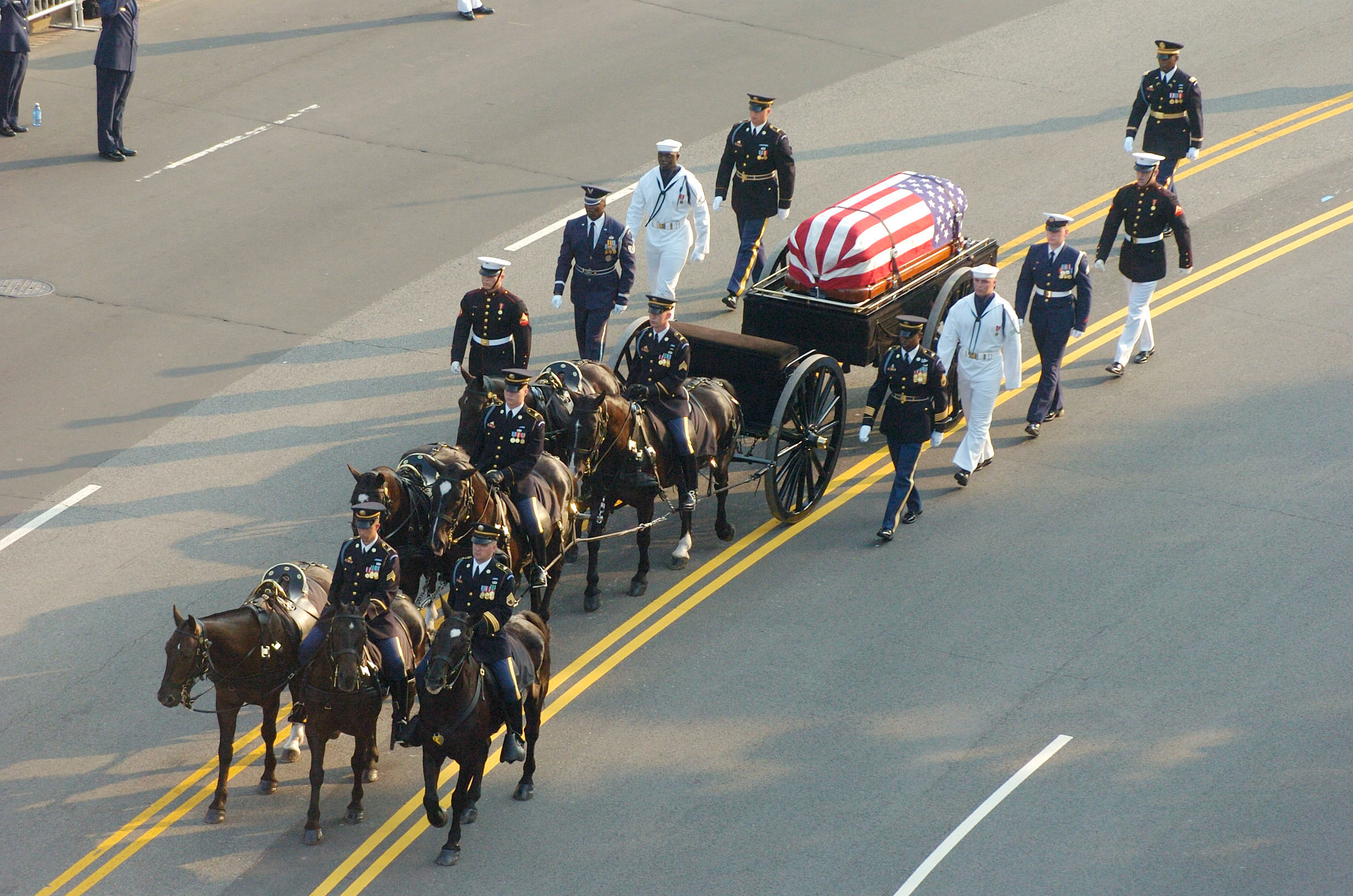
A horse-drawn caisson transporting the casket of Ronald Reagan on Constitution Avenue en route to the Capitol on June 9, 2004.

A funeral procession occurs during a state funeral on Pennsylvania or Constitution Avenue en route to the United States Capitol. Every funeral procession is led by a civilian police escort, usually by the D.C. Metropolitan Police Department. Next, the formal, ceremonial aspects of a procession are organized. A funeral procession uses a four-wheeled caisson to transport the flag-draped casket, which was originally intended to carry a 75 mm cannon when it was built in 1918. The caisson is drawn by a draft-mix of 6 same-colored horses with three riders and a section chief mounted on a separate horse from the United States Army Caisson Platoon of the 3rd United States Infantry Regiment "The Old Guard". In addition, 2 sets of four body bearers (8 total) will march on foot alongside both sides of the caisson transporting the flag-draped casket. The entire funeral procession is composed of three march units consisting of National Guard, reserve, active-duty, and academy personnel that represent the six branches of the United States Armed Forces. Moving at 3 miles per hour, the funeral procession begins in sight of the White House and travels to the United States Capitol. For former presidents, the casket is unloaded from a hearse and transferred to a caisson at 16th Street and Constitution Avenue in view of the South Lawn. The funeral procession then proceeds down Constitution Avenue. For sitting presidents, the casket is transferred at the North Portico entrance of the White House. Thereafter, the funeral procession proceeds down Pennsylvania Avenue. Two exceptions for this funeral procession were made during the state funerals of Gerald Ford on December 30, 2006, and George H. W. Bush on December 3, 2018. Respecting Ford's and Bush’s personal wishes of not having a funeral procession using a horse-drawn caisson, their caskets were transported in hearses to the United States Capitol. For Ford, the procession stopped at the National World War II Memorial in order to pay tribute to his service in the United States Navy during World War II.

Each of the three march units is led by a military band. Positioned directly in front of the caisson, three color guards will march on foot, with the center color guard having responsibility for trooping the national colors, the flag of the United States. Following immediately behind the caisson, a single color guard will march on foot trooping the presidential standard, the flag of the president of the United States.

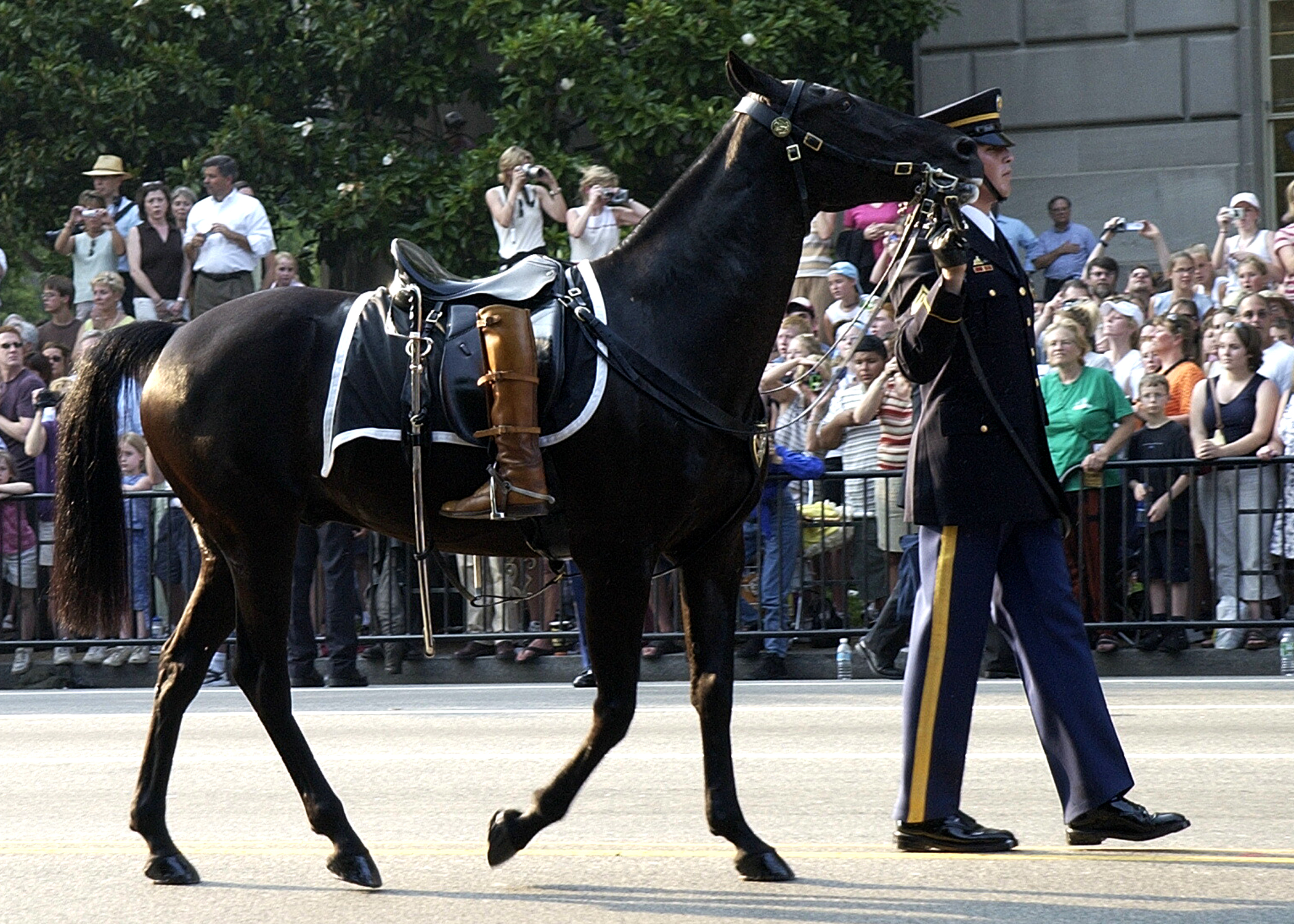
The riderless horse named "Sergeant York", during the funeral procession on June 9, 2004, for Ronald Reagan, with a ceremonial sword attached to the saddle and a pair of the president's boots reversed in the stirrups.

Next, a single honor guard will march on foot holding the reins of a caparisoned, riderless horse with a set of boots reversed in the stirrups, symbolizing a fallen warrior who will never ride again which also betokens the commander's parting look on his troops, who march behind. The equipment mounted on the caparisoned, riderless horse varies according to color of the horse. If black, a saddle blanket, saddle, and bridle are mounted on the horse. If any other color, the horse carries a folded hood and cape, along with a blanket, saddle and bridle. For presidential state funerals, the presidential seal is emblazoned on the blanket, four inches from the bottom. The inclusion of a riderless horse in a funeral procession dates back to the death of George Washington in 1799 when a caparisoned, riderless horse carried Washington's saddle, holsters, and pistol during the president's funeral. In 1865, Abraham Lincoln was honored by the inclusion of a riderless horse at his state funeral. When Lincoln's funeral train reached Springfield, Illinois, his horse "Old Bob", who was draped in a black mourning blanket, followed the funeral procession and led mourners to the president's burial plot. The most famous riderless horse was "Black Jack" who was foaled January 19, 1947, and was the last of the Quartermaster-issue horses branded with the Army's "US" brand. He was named after General of the Armies John J. "Black Jack" Pershing. He participated in the state funerals of John F. Kennedy, Herbert Hoover, and Lyndon B. Johnson, as well as the state funeral of General of the Army Douglas MacArthur. The deceased president's family, who are accompanied by federal government officials, will follow behind the funeral procession in a presidential motorcade.

During the funeral procession midway between the White House and the Capitol as the caisson passes through the intersection of Constitution Avenue and 4th Street, N.W., a flyover consisting of 21 tactical fighter aircraft from the United States Air Force, will fly in formation as a single lead aircraft followed by 5 flights of four aircraft each. The #3 aircraft in the final flight executes the maneuver of missing man low enough to be clearly seen by on-looking spectators below.

The funeral procession traditionally ends at the center steps on the east front of the Capitol. Exceptions were made for Lyndon B. Johnson, Ronald Reagan, and Gerald Ford. Johnson's casket was carried up the Senate wing steps because the center steps were blocked with construction scaffolding from the second inauguration of Richard Nixon which occurred just days earlier. As a break with tradition, Reagan, as former Governor of California, requested that his casket be carried up the steps of the Capitol's West Front facing California. Ford, as a former member of the United States House of Representatives, requested that his casket be carried up the House wing steps.

==== Funeral processions on Pennsylvania Avenue ====
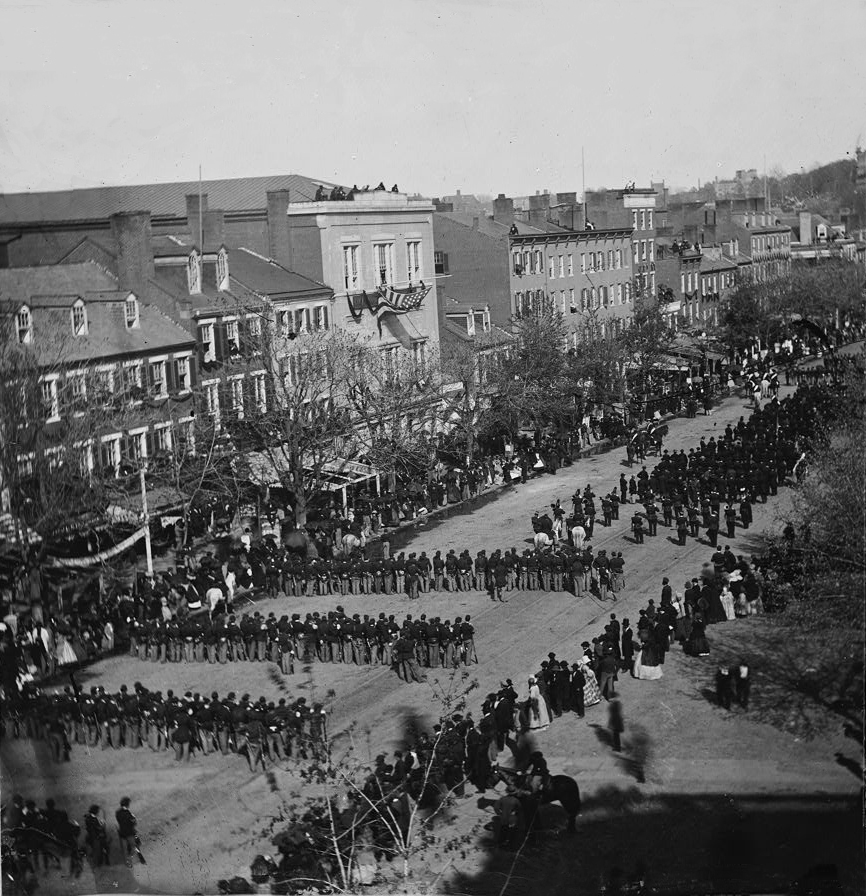
Military units seen marching down Pennsylvania Avenue in Washington, D.C., during the state funeral for Abraham Lincoln on April 19, 1865.

Pennsylvania Avenue has been used for seven funeral processions of presidents who died while in office.

In 1841, William Henry Harrison was escorted up the avenue by twenty-six pallbearers, one for each of the twenty-six U.S. states in the Union. On July 13, 1850, the funeral procession for Zachary Taylor on Pennsylvania Avenue stretched for over two miles. On April 19, 1865, a cortege numbering an unprecedented 30,000 people escorted the remains of Abraham Lincoln on the avenue from the White House to the Capitol. In 1881, the body of James A. Garfield was escorted on Pennsylvania Avenue by the new president, Chester A. Arthur, and former president Ulysses S. Grant.

Returned to Washington, D.C., ten days earlier by a funeral train, the remains of William McKinley were escorted on the rain-dampened avenue from the White House to the Capitol on September 17, 1901. Carriages bearing the new president, Theodore Roosevelt, and ex-President Grover Cleveland, preceded the marchers. On August 8, 1923, Warren G. Harding was honored by a cavalry escort led by General John J. Pershing during the president's funeral procession on the avenue to the Capitol. Kennedy's casket rode on the same caisson that had borne Franklin D. Roosevelt's body on Constitution Avenue eighteen years earlier, making Roosevelt the only president to die in office whose funeral procession did not take place on Pennsylvania Avenue.

Several former presidents have also been so honored. Among them, John Quincy Adams was serving in the House of Representatives at the time of his death in 1848, and William Howard Taft in 1930, who had a few weeks earlier stepped down as Chief Justice of the United States. Additionally, Lyndon B. Johnson's funeral procession went down Pennsylvania Avenue, but from the Capitol, on the way to National City Christian Church for the funeral service on January 25, 1973. Most recently, Jimmy Carter's funeral procession went down Pennsylvania Avenue to the Capitol, with a casket transfer stop the United States Navy Memorial on January 7, 2025.

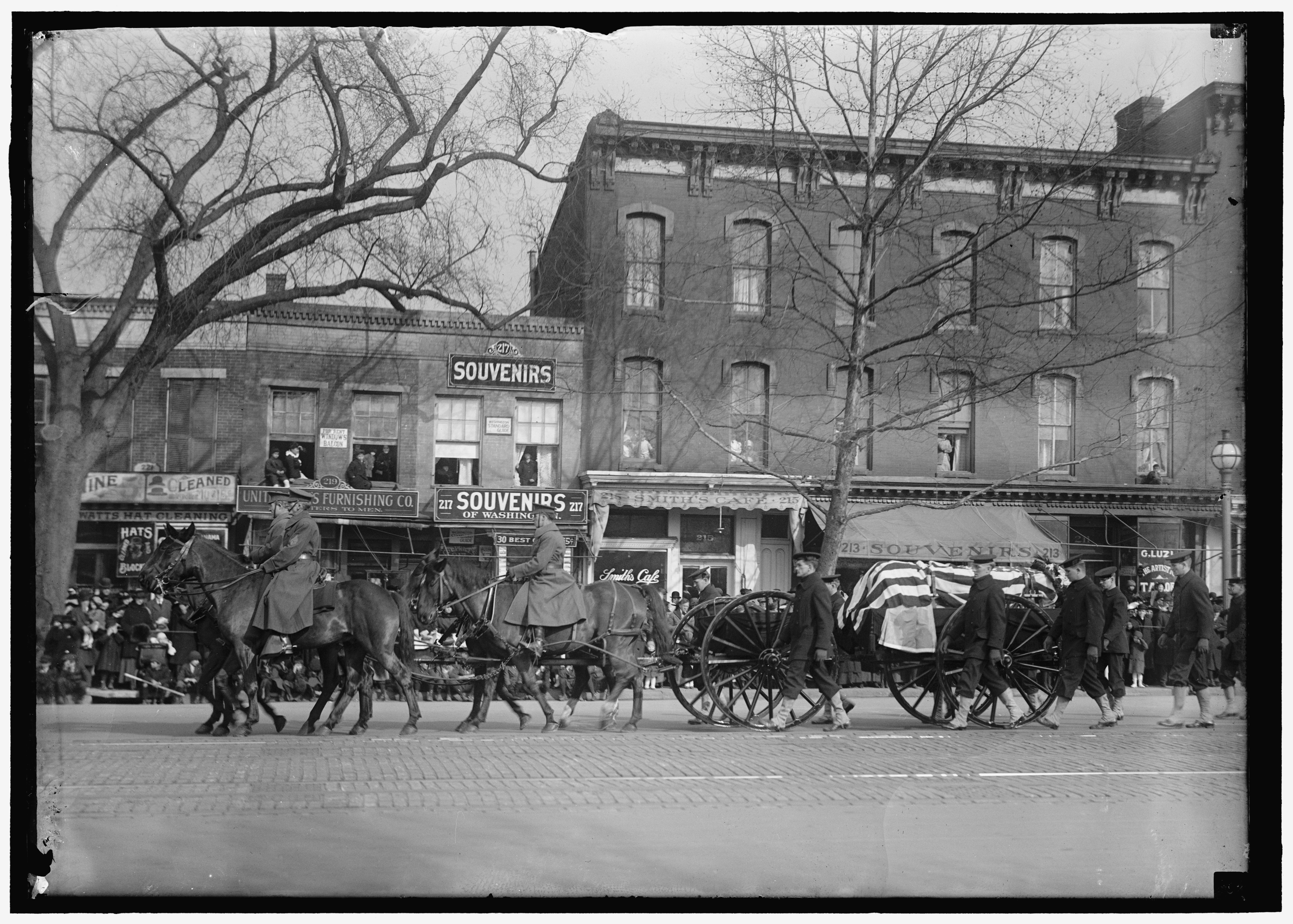
The funeral procession of Admiral George Dewey at the 200 block of Pennsylvania Avenue on January 20, 1917.

The nation has also honored other people with a funeral procession on Pennsylvania Avenue. They include Vice President George Clinton, who died in office in 1812; generals Jacob Brown in 1828, Alexander Macomb in 1841 and Philip Sheridan in 1888; Admiral George Dewey in 1917; and Ambassador Adlai Stevenson in 1965. On March 2, 1844, Secretary of State Abel Upshur and Secretary of the Navy Thomas Walker Gilmer, as well as three other victims of the 1844 gun explosion disaster aboard the USS Princeton, were all honored with a funeral procession led by then-general Zachary Taylor on Pennsylvania Avenue.

The nation also honored the Unknown Soldier of World War I with a funeral procession on the avenue on November 11, 1921. President Harding, General Pershing, and Chief Justice Taft all walked on foot behind the caisson while former president Woodrow Wilson rode in a horse-drawn carriage, which was followed by the entire Congress.

=== Capitol rotunda service and lying in state ===
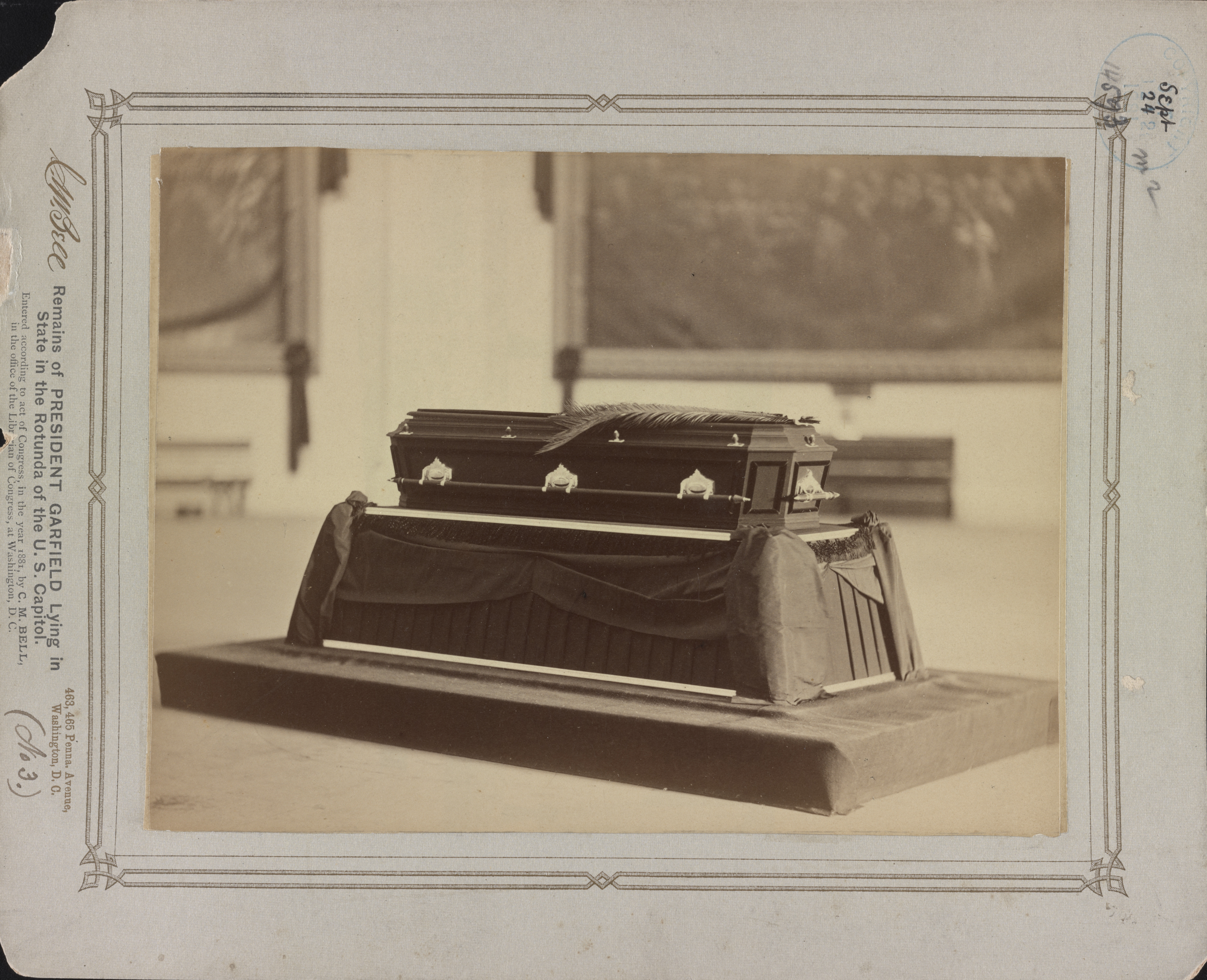
The Lincoln Catafalque was used when James A. Garfield lay in state in the Capitol rotunda, September 21–23, 1881.

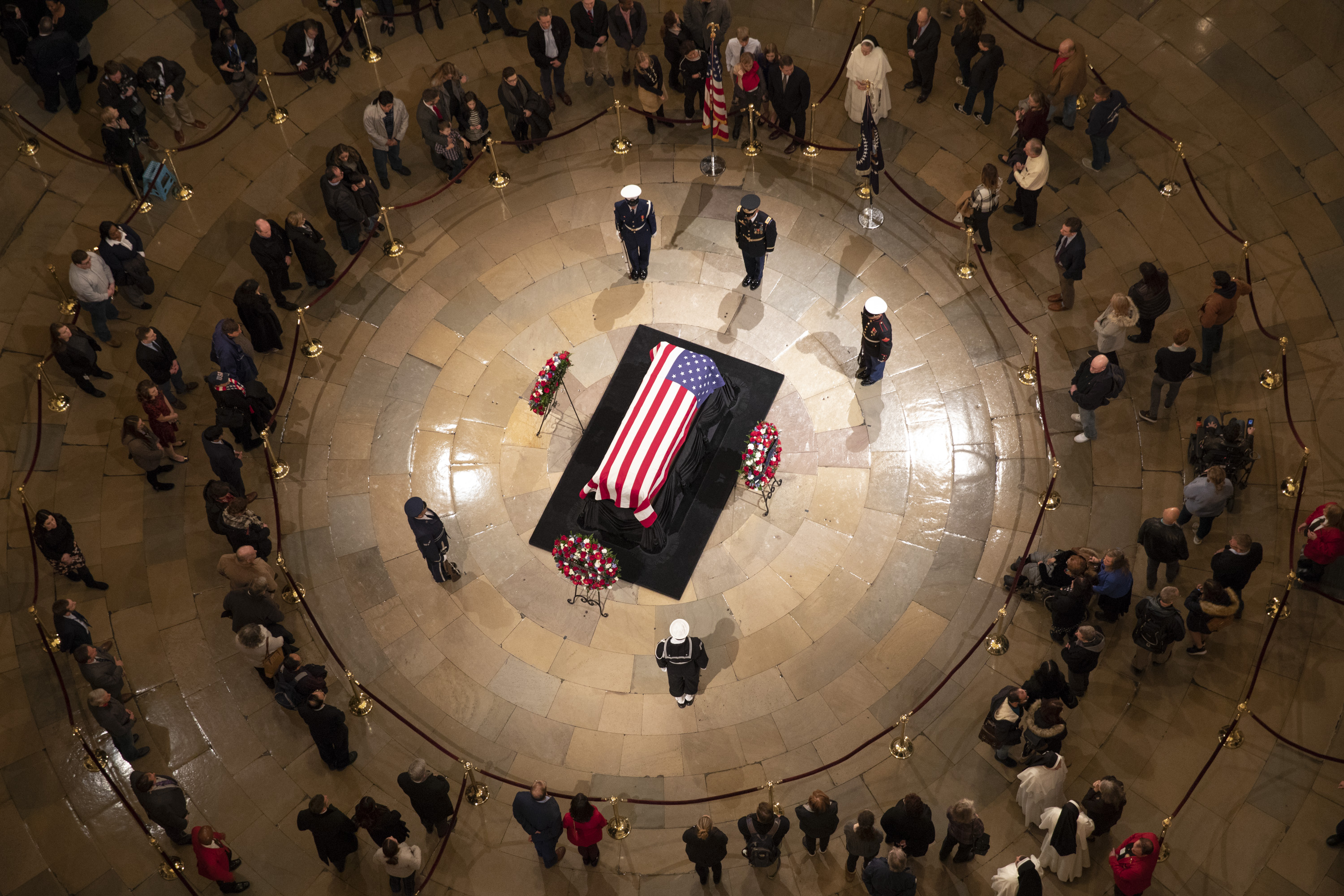
Members of the public paying their respects in the Capitol rotunda during the lying in state of George H. W. Bush on the evening of December 3, 2018.

Shortly after the casket is moved onto the floor of the Capitol rotunda and placed on top of the Lincoln catafalque, members of the United States Congress gather to pay tribute. A program which includes eulogies, a benediction, prayers, and the laying of floral wreaths will be conducted. Afterward, the president's remains lie in state or an honoree's remains lie in honor for public viewing. Although lying in state continues for a period of at least 24 hours, it differs from lying in honor. Five honor guards, each representing a branch of the Armed Forces, will face the flag-draped casket while holding their rifles with their right hand and keeping the rifle butt resting on the floor. These honor guards will periodically rotate in order to relieve previous honor guards during their constant vigil over the casket. A mass public viewing is permitted during the lying in state until one hour before the next departure ceremony begins.

=== Religious service ===
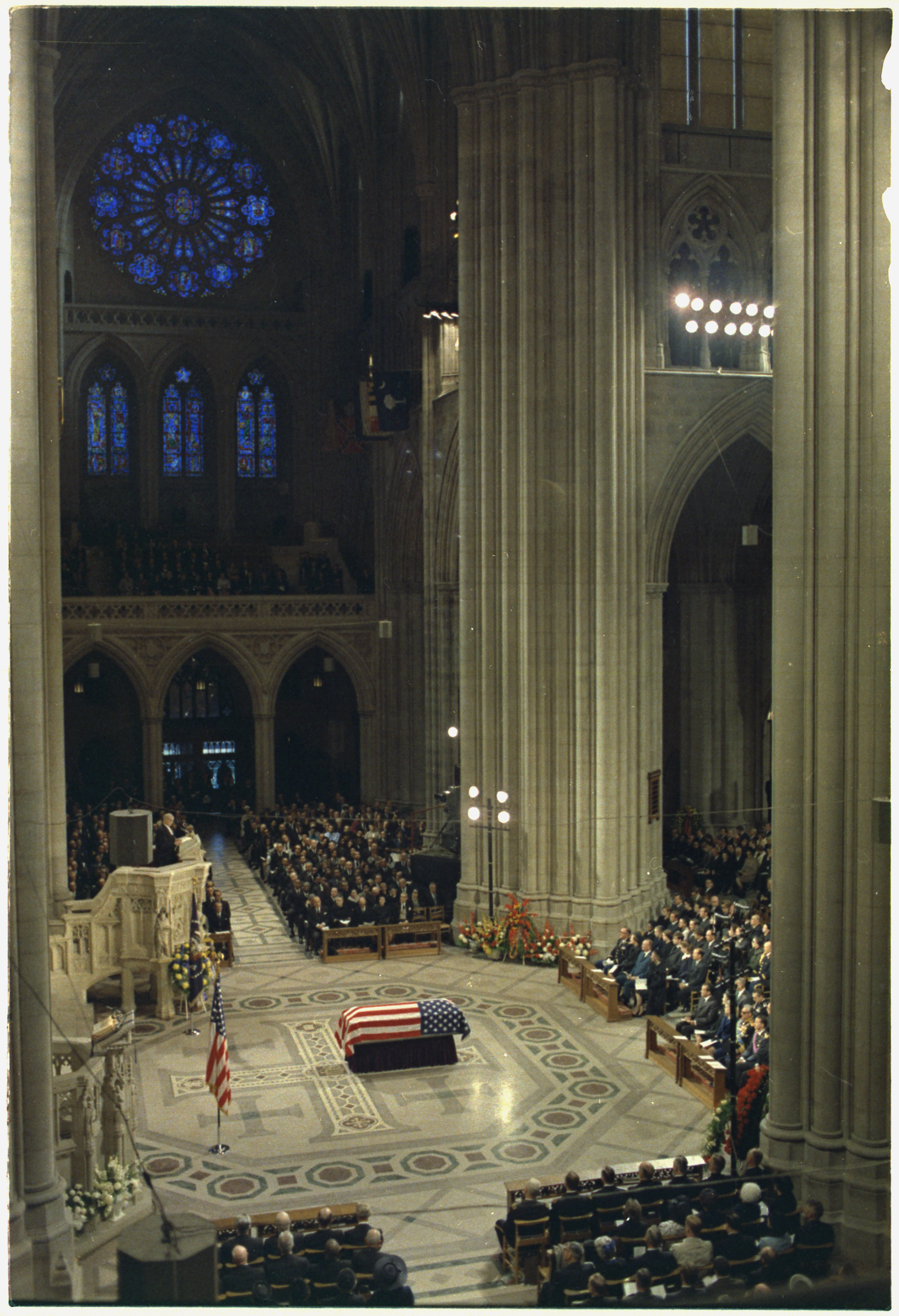
Over 2,100 people attended the Episcopal funeral service for Dwight D. Eisenhower at Washington National Cathedral on March 31, 1969.

A national funeral service, with a religious theme, is traditionally held at Washington National Cathedral in Washington, D.C., or at another church, depending on the president's religious faith. Funeral services for Dwight D. Eisenhower, Ronald Reagan, Gerald Ford, George H.W. Bush, and Jimmy Carter were held at the cathedral. William Howard Taft had his funeral at All Souls' Church, Unitarian, where he was a congregant. John F. Kennedy's requiem mass was held at the Cathedral of St. Matthew the Apostle, as he was a Roman Catholic. A funeral service was held for Lyndon B. Johnson at National City Christian Church, as he worshipped there often while president.

Various foreign dignitaries, heads of state, royalty, and government officials attend. On the matter of seating arrangements, the family of the deceased is immediately followed by federal government officials, and then by foreign heads of state who are arranged alphabetically by the English spelling of the countries in which they represent. Royalty representing heads of state, such as princes and dukes, come next, followed by foreign heads of government, such as prime ministers and premiers. During the funeral service, military top brass sit in the north transept and extended family members sit in the south transept, if the funeral service is held at Washington National Cathedral. The length of these religious services has varied. More recent ones have tended to include multiple eulogies and thus have been longer. Eisenhower's was roughly thirty minutes. Bush's was slightly over two hours.

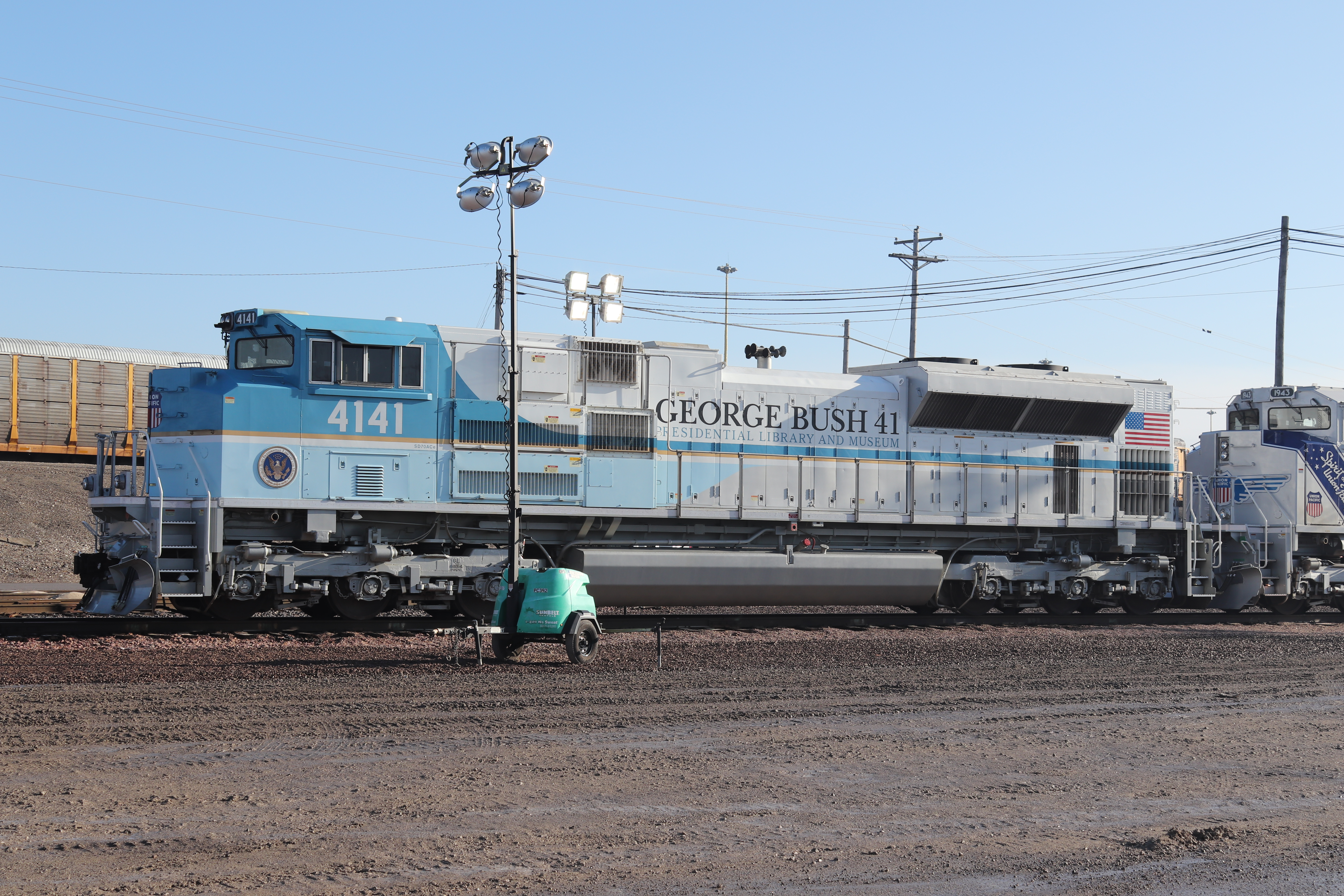
The EMD SD70ACe locomotive known as Union Pacific 4141 used to transport the remains of George H. W. Bush on a funeral train from Spring, Texas, to his presidential library in College Station for interment on December 6, 2018.

Immediately after the national funeral service is completed, the casket travels to its final resting place for interment. Before the mid-20th century, the casket was moved long distances across the nation by a funeral train procession, where thousands of mourners would line the railroad tracks to pay homage. VIP transport in recent decades between the deceased president's home state and Washington, D.C., has been aboard one of the two Boeing VC-25 jets (tail codes SAM 28000 and SAM 29000) in the presidential fleet which are operated by the 89th Airlift Wing at Joint Base Andrews. As protocol dictates, any deceased president whose remains are flown on an Air Force jet are not entitled to use the call sign Air Force One since this call sign is exclusively reserved for any aircraft in the Air Force with a sitting and living president aboard. The departure and arrival ceremonies held at Joint Base Andrews as well as at the final destination of interment are met with honor guards, a military band, and a 21-gun salute as the casket is loaded on and unloaded off the aft section of a Boeing VC-25. Because of air transportation in the modern era, it has now become possible for a funeral service and interment to be completed within the same day, as seen during the state funerals of Lyndon B. Johnson in January 1973, Ronald Reagan in June 2004, and Jimmy Carter in January 2025. However, there were two notable exceptions for Dwight D. Eisenhower in 1969 and George H. W. Bush in 2018. Instead of using a Boeing VC-137C jet (tail code SAM 26000) which at the time typically served the role as Air Force One, a funeral train was used to carry and transport Eisenhower’s casket. Departing from Washington Union Station in Washington, D.C., on March 31, 1969, Eisenhower's funeral train arrived in his hometown of Abilene, Kansas, on April 2, 1969. Interment inside the 'Place of Meditation' located on the grounds of the Eisenhower Presidential Library occurred later that day. Although Bush’s casket was flown back to Texas from Washington using a Boeing VC-25 on December 5, 2018, his remains were transported on December 6, 2018, for interment at the George Bush Presidential Library in College Station using a funeral train that was powered by a specially painted EMD SD70ACe locomotive known as Union Pacific 4141.

=== Interment ===
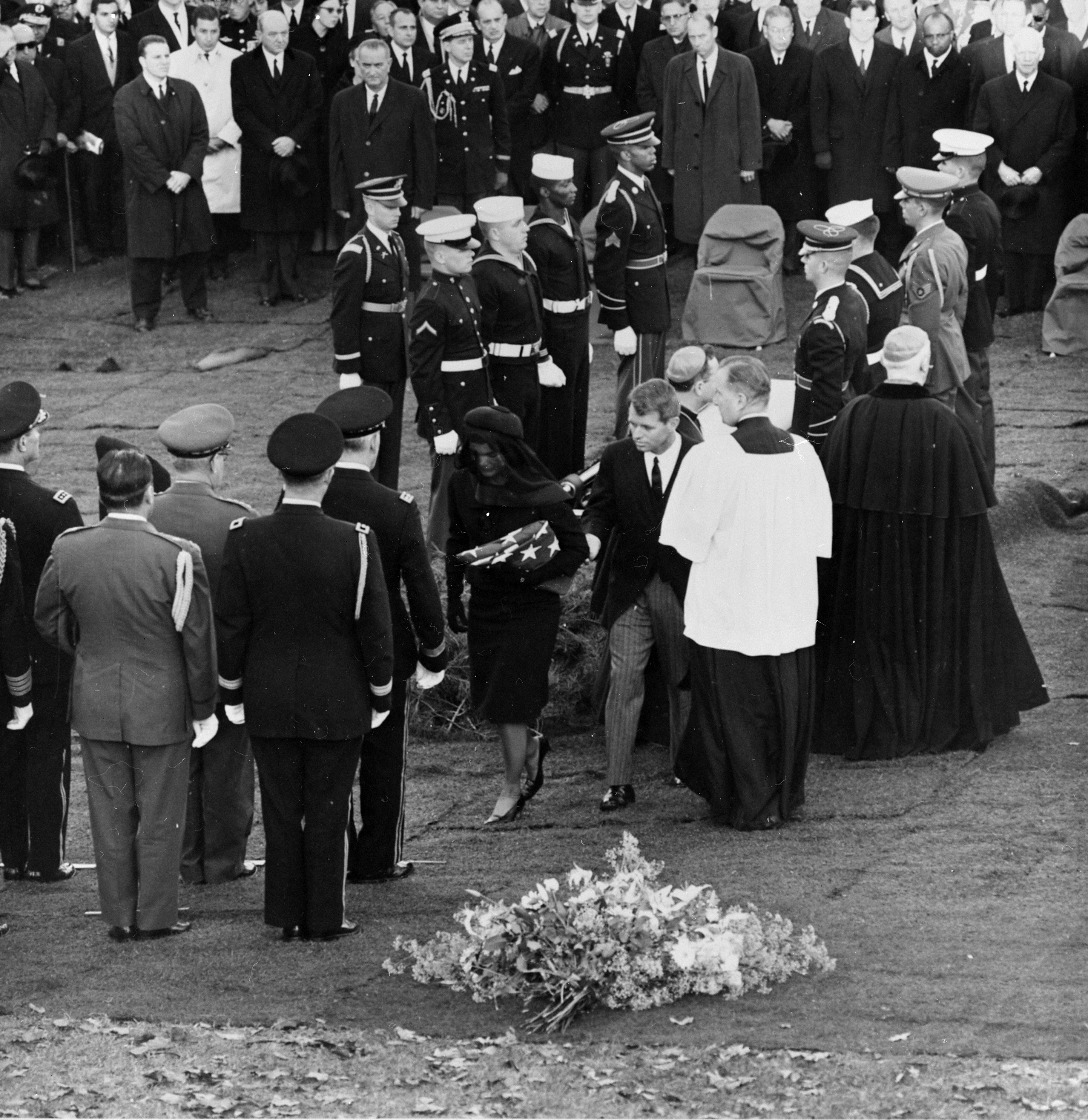
Jacqueline Kennedy and Senator Robert F. Kennedy departing Arlington National Cemetery after the conclusion of interment for John F. Kennedy on November 25, 1963.

More reminiscent of a military funeral during interment, presidents are automatically accorded full military honors in recognition of their role as Commander-in-Chief of the United States Armed Forces. A three-volley salute is fired over the gravesite by seven members who form a rifle party. This however, does not constitute a 21-gun salute. Taps, a bugle call sounded over the grave dating from the era of the American Civil War is performed by one lone bugler from the United States Marine Band, thirty to fifty yards away. Immediately thereafter, the United States Marine Band will perform William Whiting's Eternal Father, Strong to Save as the "Final Salute" is given.

During interment, fighter aircraft provided by the United States Air Force will perform a second and final aerial flyover in missing man formation, as would be previously observed during a ceremonial procession on Constitution Avenue in Washington, D.C.

==== Flag folding and presentation ====
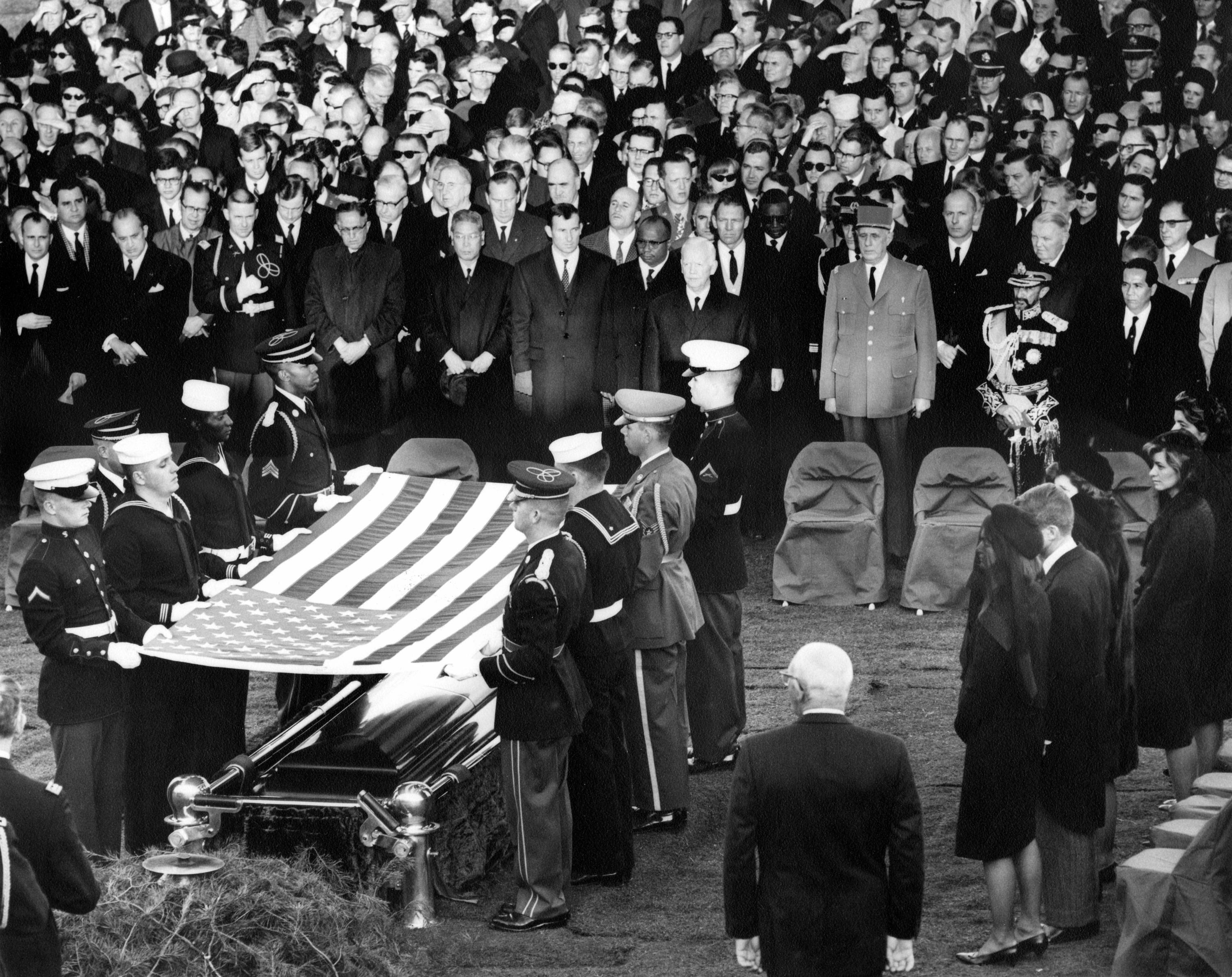
Eight guards of honor prepare to fold the U.S. flag over President John F. Kennedy's casket at Arlington National Cemetery on November 25, 1963.

A final component of a state funeral, as is typically offered during military funerals for fallen veterans, is the folding of the flag of the United States and its presentation to the next of kin. The flag draped over the casket is meticulously folded twelve times by a total of eight honor guards, four on each side of the casket. Next, an honor guard representing one of the five branches of the Armed Forces will present the flag to the next of kin by kneeling in front of the recipient, holding the folded flag waist high with the straight edge facing the recipient, while leaning toward the recipient. Until 2012, depending on the service of the selected honor guard chosen to present the flag to the next of kin, each of the five military branches used slightly different wording.

== Music ==
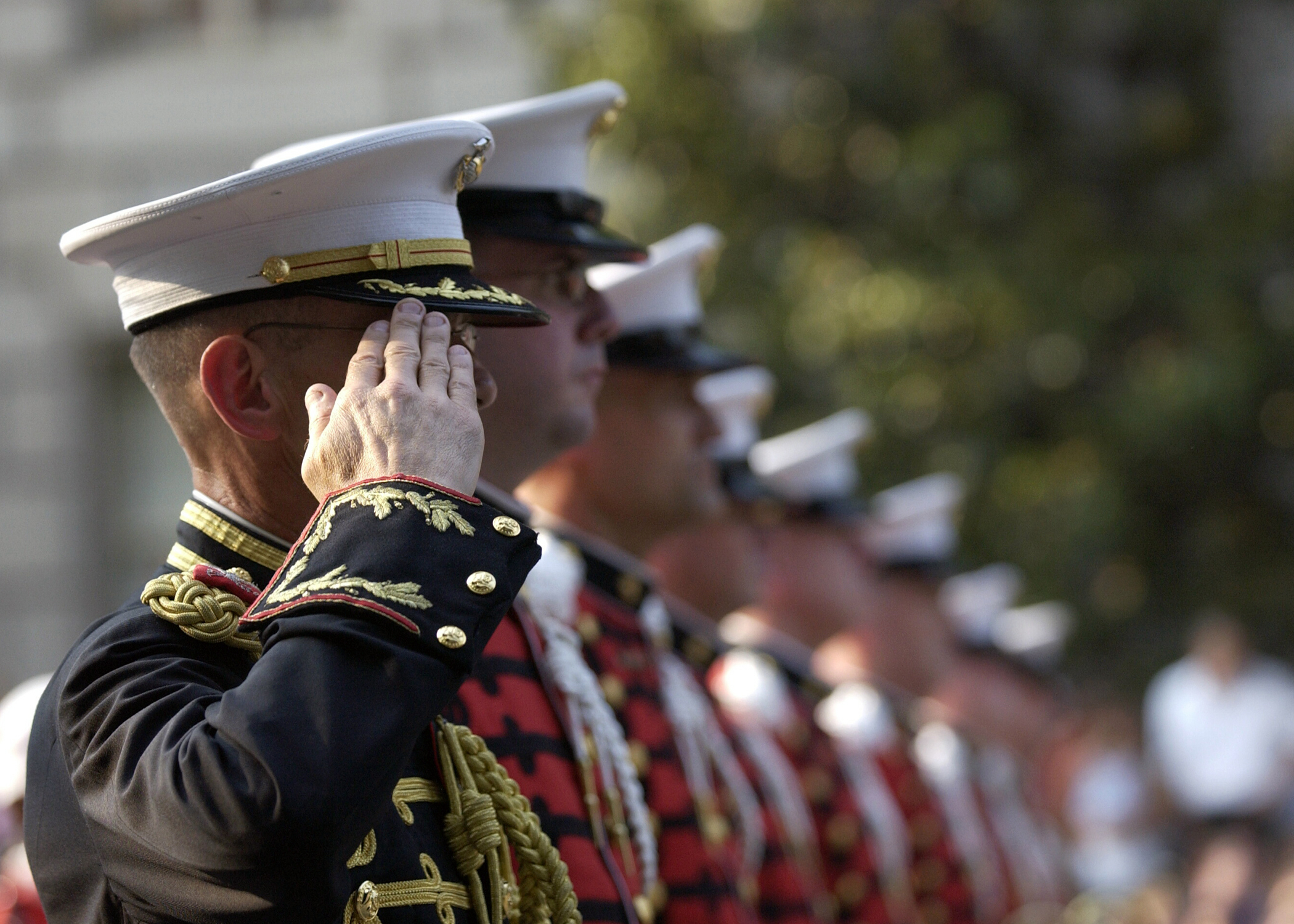
Members of the United States Marine Band participated in Ronald Reagan's funeral procession to the Capitol on June 9, 2004.

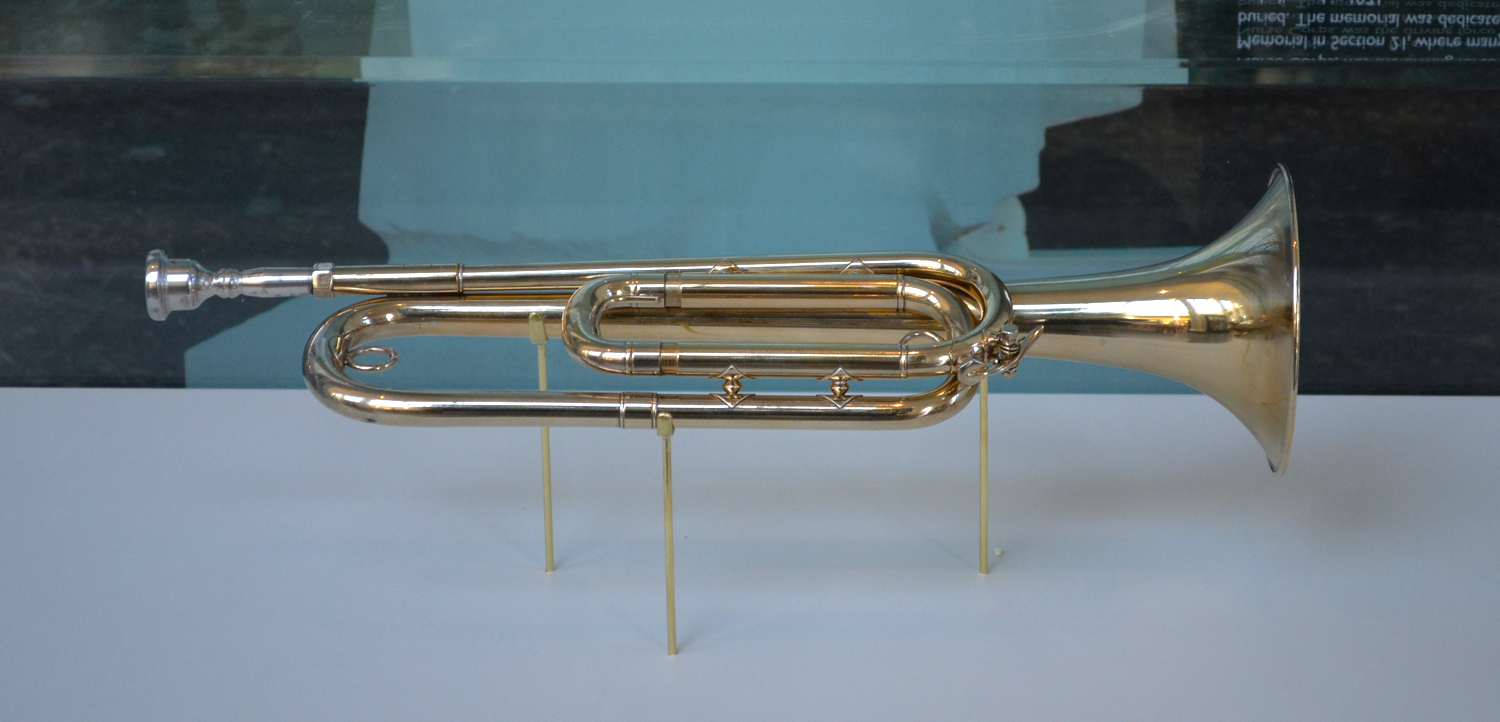
The bugle used by Keith Clark to perform Taps during John F. Kennedy's interment at Arlington National Cemetery on November 25, 1963.

The premier military bands from the five branches of the Armed Forces have an approved musical repertoire that they perform while marching on Pennsylvania or Constitution Avenue. The use of muffled drums and bagpipes are common as well.

Military musical honors such as the presidential fanfare Hail to the Chief, the bugle call Taps, and Ruffles and flourishes, are performed by military bands as a mark of respect.

During the state funeral of John F. Kennedy in 1963, as an example, the United States Marine Band performed Holy, Holy, Holy by Reginald Heber, Our Fallen Heroes, and The Vanished Army after clearing the Capitol Plaza and joining military units for the 35-minute march on Constitution Avenue to the White House. The United States Navy Band selected Symphony No. 3 "The Funeral March" by Ludwig van Beethoven, The Funeral March by Robert Browne Hall, and the hymn Onward, Christian Soldiers by Arthur Sullivan. The United States Air Force Band chose to perform Piano Sonata No. 2 "The Funeral March", by Frédéric Chopin, the hymn Vigor in Arduis (also known as Hymn to the Holy Name), and America the Beautiful by Samuel A. Ward. During the funeral procession from the White House to the Cathedral of St. Matthew the Apostle, Kennedy was honored by nine bagpipers from the Black Watch, an infantry battalion of the Royal Regiment of Scotland, who traveled from the United Kingdom to participate in the state funeral. They performed The Brown Haired Maiden, The Badge of Scotland, The 51st Highland Division, and The Barren Rocks of Aden.

During a national funeral service, such as those held at Washington National Cathedral, the Cathedral Choir or the Armed Forces Choir will sing a selection of religious and patriotic music. In 1969, Dwight D. Eisenhower's state funeral included a religious service at the Cathedral that incorporated music such as Schmucke dich, o liebe Seele by Johann Sebastian Bach and O Welt, ich muss dich lassen by Johannes Brahms. During the state funeral of Ronald Reagan in 2004, Joyful, Joyful We Adore Thee by Ludwig van Beethoven and Mansions of the Lord by Nick Glennie-Smith were performed in the cathedral. The state funeral of Gerald Ford in 2006–07 included music such as O God, Our Help in Ages Past by William Croft, Eternal Father, Strong to Save (also known as The Navy Hymn), and Fanfare for the Common Man by Aaron Copland. In 2018, the state funeral of George H. W. Bush included the hymns The King of Love My Shepherd Is by Henry Williams Baker, My House Shall Be Called a House of Prayer by Douglas Major, Eternal Father, Strong to Save, and Croft’s O God, Our Help in Ages Past. During John F. Kennedy's Requiem Mass at the St. Matthew's Cathedral in 1963, the St. Matthew's Choir sang Subvenite and Sanctus and Benedictus. Tenor soloist Luigi Vena sang Pie Jesu by Ignace Leybach, Ave Maria by Franz Schubert, and In Manus Tuus by Vincent Novello. The organist and choirmaster was Eugene Stewart.

Solo musicians who are globally acclaimed have also performed during a funeral service, a recent example being Irish tenor Ronan Tynan singing at the state funerals of Reagan (2004) and Bush (2018) at Washington National Cathedral. At Reagan's former first lady Nancy Reagan requested he sing Amazing Grace. During the Ford state funeral in 2007, renowned Metropolitan Opera singer Denyce Graves sang The Lord’s Prayer by Albert Hay Malotte at the cathedral during the homily. In 2018, Tynan's musical selections included Malotte’s The Lord’s Prayer and Last Full Measure of Devotion by Larry Grossman. In addition, Christian contemporary soloist Michael W. Smith sang Friends, a piece of music attributed to him. Other venues, such as National City Christian Church invited American soprano Leontyne Price to sing Take My Hand, Precious Lord during Lyndon B. Johnson's state funeral in 1973.

== List of lying in state and honor recipients ==
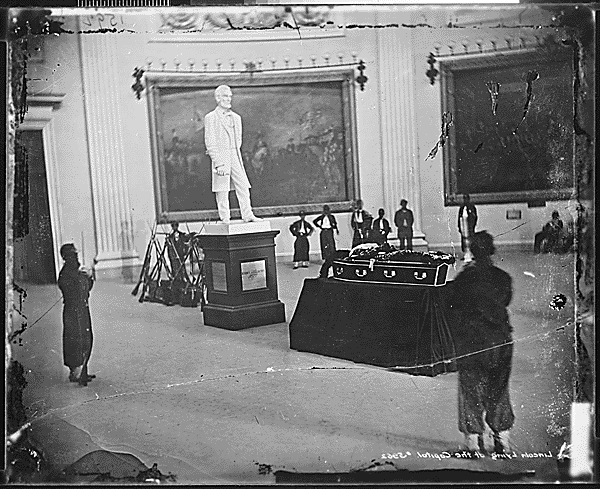
Thaddeus Stevens lay in state in the Capitol rotunda on August 13, 1868. A statue of Abraham Lincoln situated behind Stevens' casket was credited to "Henry J. Ellicott".

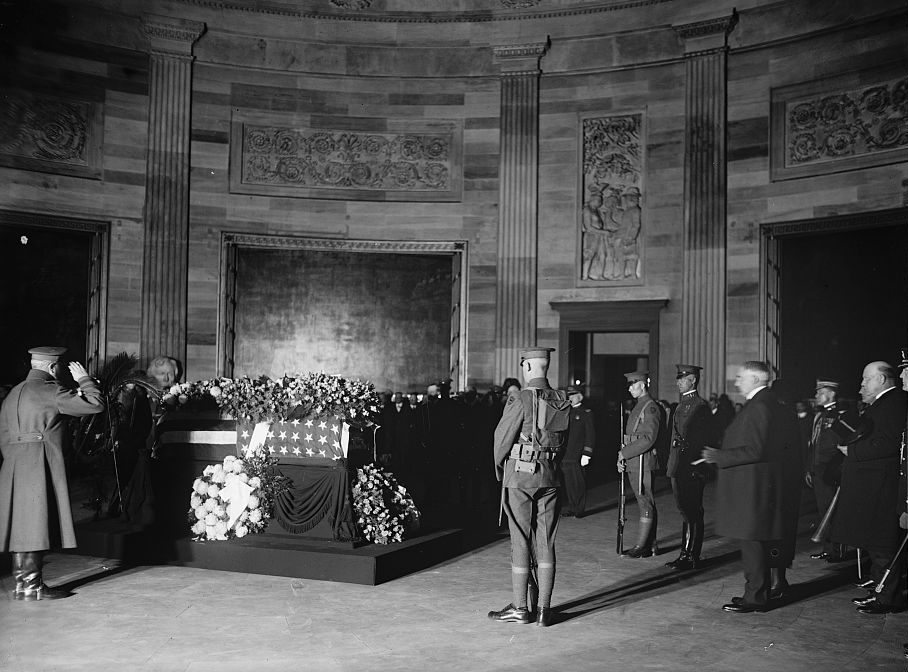
John J. Pershing saluting the Unknown Soldier of World War I who lay in state in the Capitol rotunda on November 9, 1921.

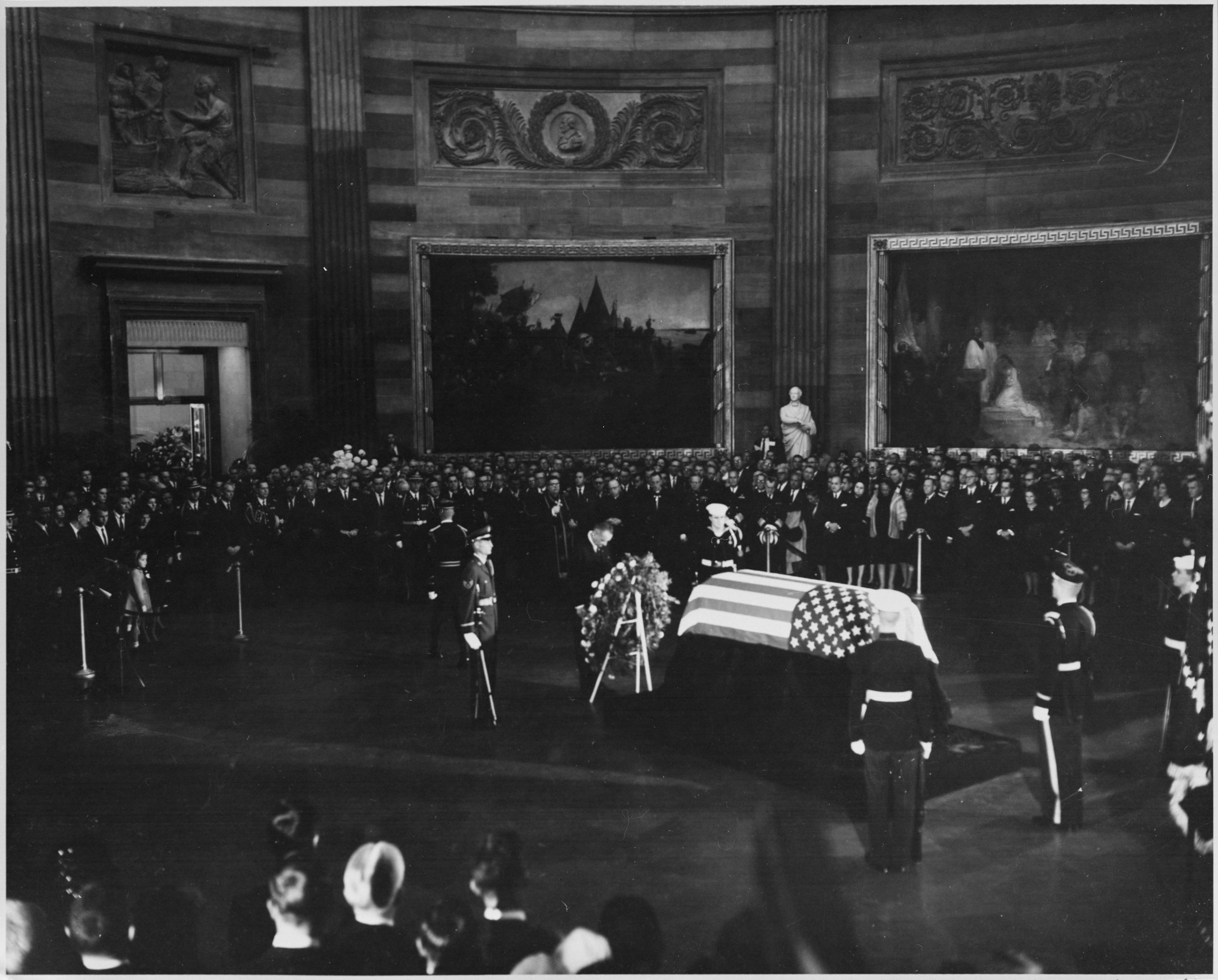
Lyndon B. Johnson, members of Congress and the Kennedy family view the lying in state of John F. Kennedy in the Capitol rotunda on November 24, 1963.

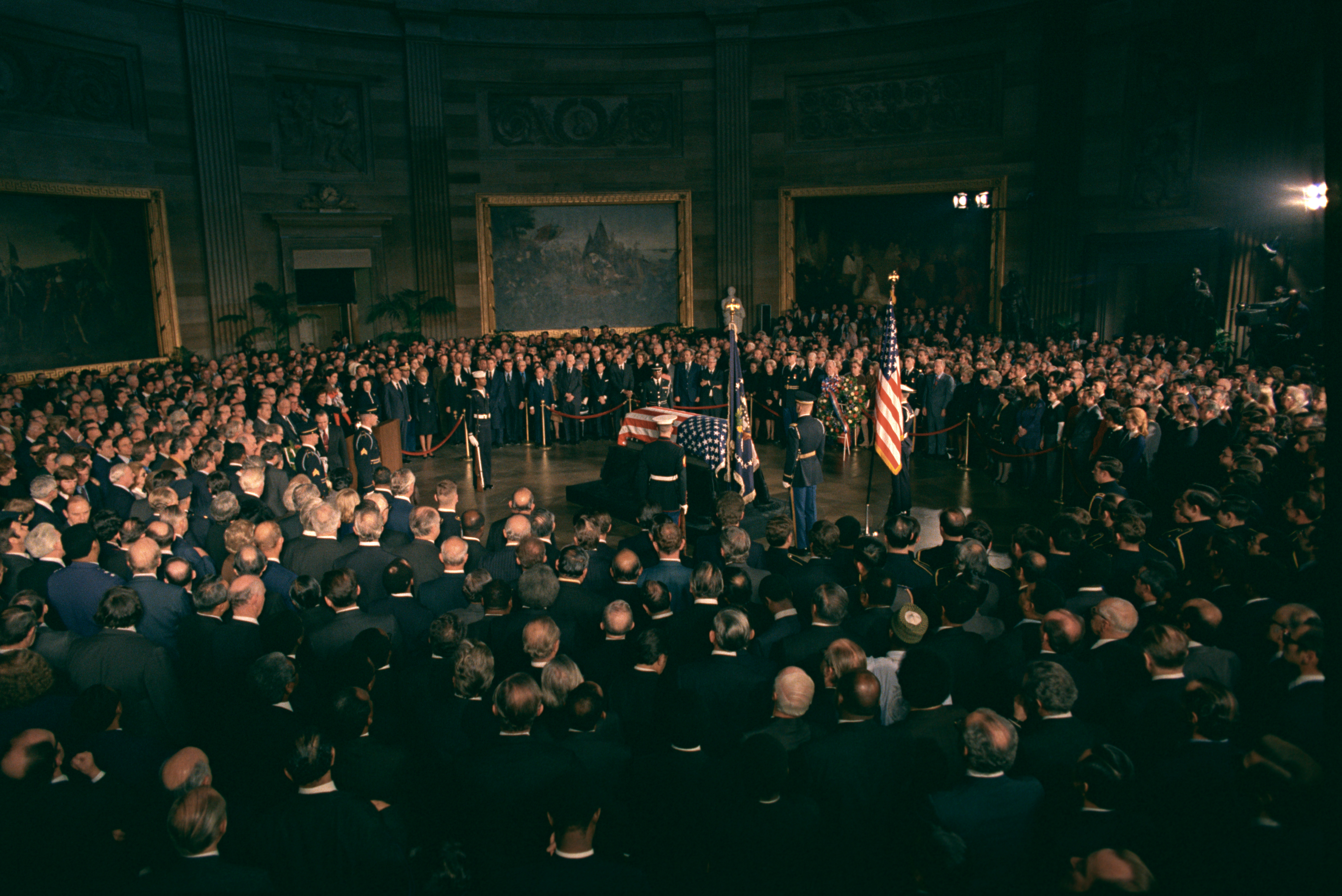
Richard Nixon, members of Congress and the Johnson family view the lying in state of Lyndon B. Johnson in the Capitol rotunda on January 24, 1973.

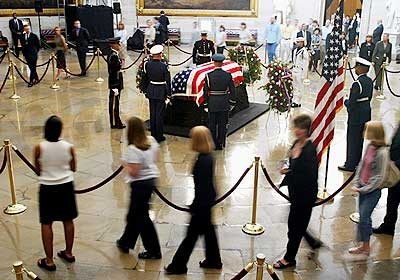
The remains of Ronald Reagan lying in state in the Capitol rotunda on June 10, 2004, as mourners and spectators file past his casket.

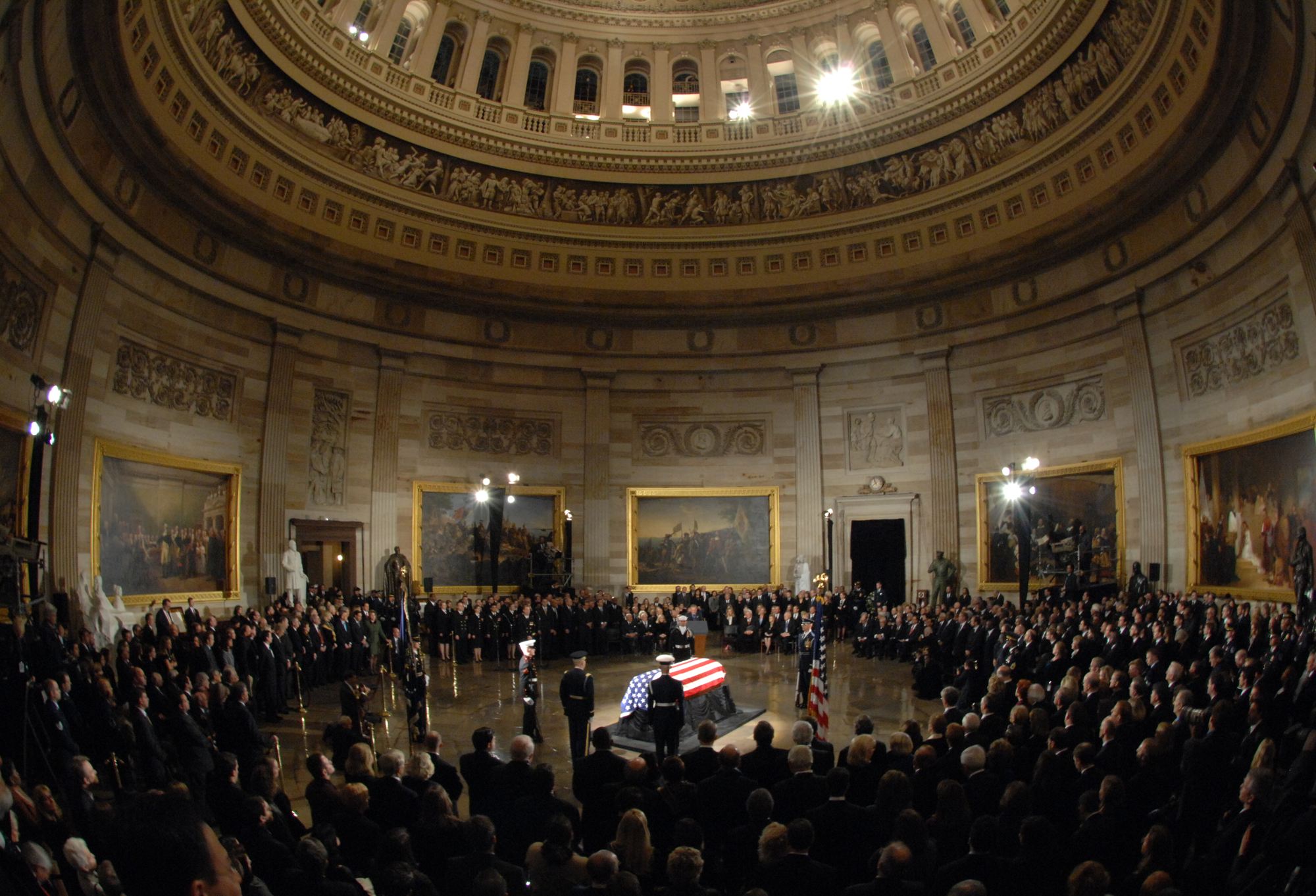
Dick Cheney, members of Congress and the Ford family view the lying in state of Gerald Ford in the Capitol rotunda on December 30, 2006.

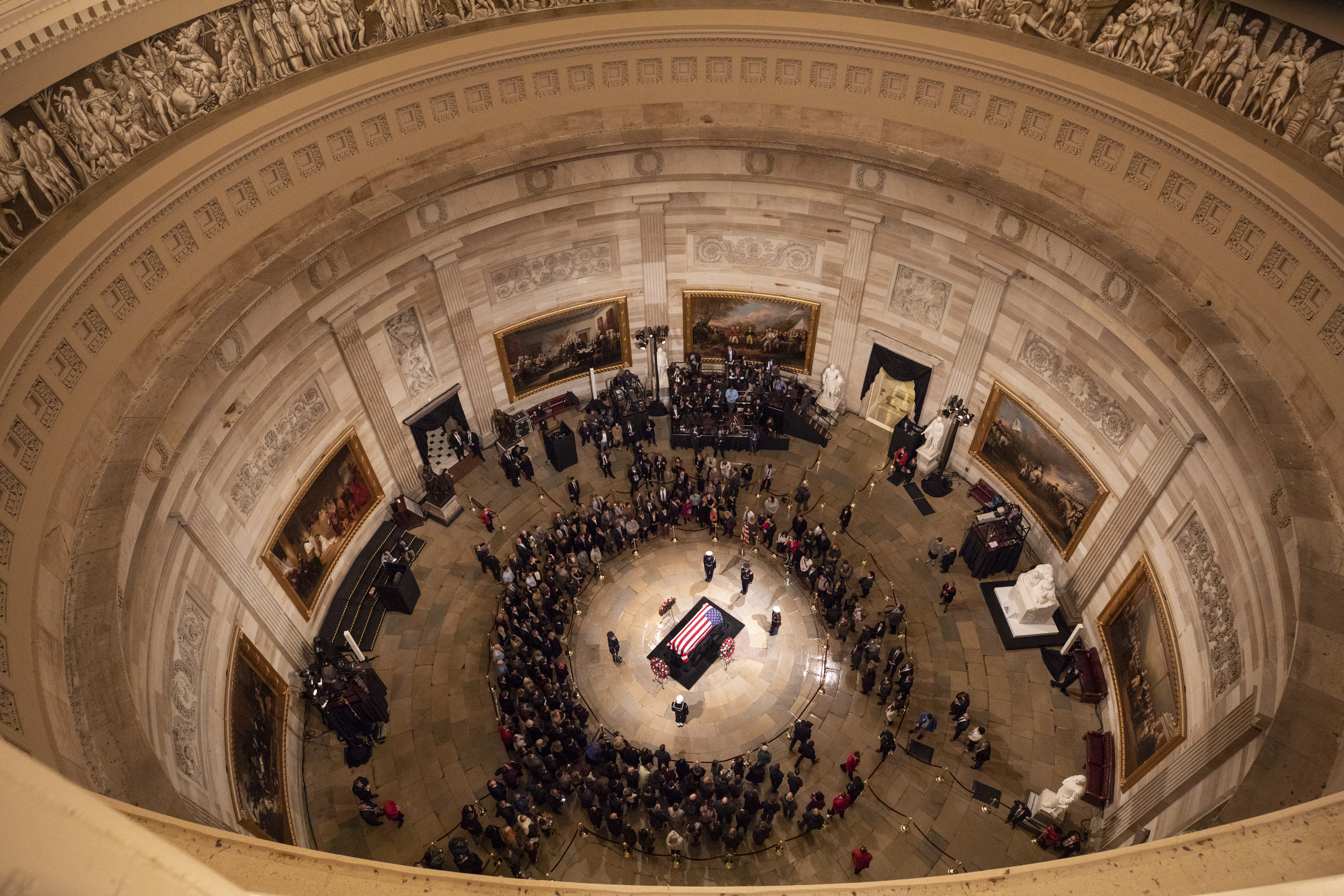
Members of the public view the lying in state of George H. W. Bush in the Capitol rotunda on December 3, 2018.

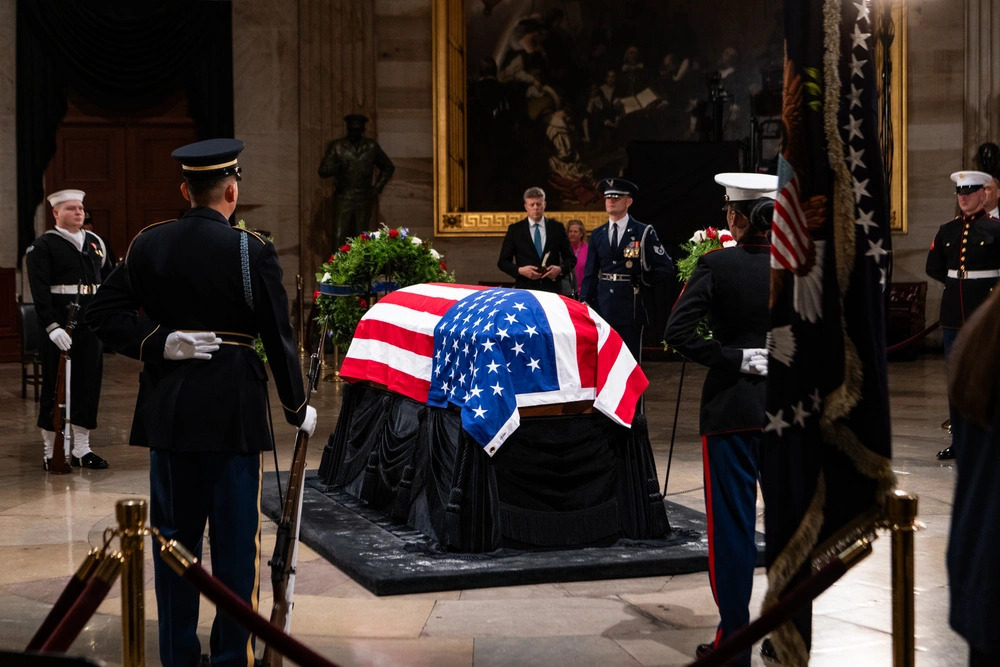
The casket of Jimmy Carter lying in state in the Capitol rotunda on January 7, 2025.

Since the death of Henry Clay in 1852, the United States Capitol rotunda has served as the venue for honoring 34 military officers and politicians – including 12 presidents – with a lying in state. Not all who lie in state nor all for whom flags are flown at half-staff receive a state funeral. A distinction is made between recipients who are permitted to lie in state and those who lie in honor. Incumbent and past government officials whose remains are placed in the rotunda for view by the public to pay their respects will lie in state. Individuals other than members of the government will lie in honor. The rotunda has been used five times for six individuals who have lain in honor: four members of the United States Capitol Police killed defending the building (two in 1998 and two in separate incidents in 2021); civil rights activist Rosa Parks in 2005; and evangelist and minister Billy Graham in 2018.

When lying in state, six guards of honor, each representing one of the six branches of the Armed Forces, will periodically rotate and relieve the preceding set of guards of honor who watch over the remains. For recipients who have been designated to lie in honor, the United States Capitol Police will act as guards of honor. No law, written rule, or regulation specifies who may lie in state. Use of the Capitol rotunda is controlled by a concurrent resolution of the House of Representatives and the Senate. Any person who has rendered distinguished service to the nation may lie in state if the family so wishes and the United States Congress approves. In the case of unknown soldiers, the president or the appropriate branch of the Armed Forces initiates the action.

People who have lain in state in the United States Capitol rotunda

- Henry Clay (July 1, 1852)
- Abraham Lincoln (April 19–21, 1865)
- Thaddeus Stevens (August 13–14, 1868)
- Charles Sumner (March 13, 1874)
- Henry Wilson (November 25–26, 1875)
- James A. Garfield (September 21–23, 1881)
- John Logan (December 30–31, 1886)
- William McKinley (September 17, 1901)
- Pierre Charles L'Enfant (April 28, 1909)
- George Dewey (January 20, 1917)
- Unknown Soldier of World War I (November 9–11, 1921)
- Warren G. Harding (August 8, 1923)
- William Howard Taft (March 11, 1930)
- John Pershing (July 18–19, 1948)
- Robert Taft (August 2–3, 1953)
- Unknown Soldiers of World War II and the Korean War (May 28–30, 1958)
- John F. Kennedy (November 24–25, 1963)
- Douglas MacArthur (April 8–9, 1964)
- Herbert Hoover (October 23–25, 1964)
- Dwight D. Eisenhower (March 30–31, 1969)
- Everett Dirksen (September 9–10, 1969)
- J. Edgar Hoover (May 3–4, 1972)
- Lyndon B. Johnson (January 24–25, 1973)
- Hubert Humphrey (January 14–15, 1978)
- Unknown Soldier of the Vietnam War, later identified as Michael Blassie (May 25–28, 1984)
- Claude Pepper (June 1–2, 1989)
- Ronald Reagan (June 9–11, 2004)
- Gerald Ford (December 30, 2006 – January 2, 2007)
- Daniel Inouye (December 20, 2012)
- John McCain (August 31, 2018)
- George H. W. Bush (December 3–5, 2018)
- John Lewis (July 27–29, 2020*)
- Bob Dole (December 9, 2021)
- Harry Reid (January 12, 2022)
- Jimmy Carter (January 7–9, 2025)
- Lindsey Graham (July 28, 2026)

People who have lain in honor in the United States Capitol rotunda

- Jacob Chestnut and John Gibson, Capitol Police officers killed in a 1998 shooting (July 28, 1998)
- Rosa Parks (October 30–31, 2005)
- Billy Graham (February 28 – March 1, 2018)
- Brian Sicknick, Capitol Police officer killed in the line of duty in 2021 Capitol attack (February 2, 2021)
- Billy Evans, Capitol Police officer killed in the 2021 Capitol car attack (April 13, 2021)
- Woody Williams, last World War II Medal of Honor recipient (July 13, 2022)
- Ralph Puckett, last Korean War Medal of Honor recipient (April 29, 2024)

People who have lain in state in the National Statuary Hall at the United States Capitol

- Elijah Cummings (October 24, 2019)
- Ruth Bader Ginsburg (September 25, 2020)
- Don Young (March 29, 2022)

People who have lain in state in the House Chamber at the United States Capitol

- Samuel Hooper (February 16, 1875)

People who have lain in state in the Herbert C. Hoover Building

- Ron Brown (April 9–10, 1996)

People who have lain in repose in the Senate Chamber at the United States Capitol

- George Clinton (April 21, 1812)
- William Langer (November 10, 1959)
- Robert Byrd (July 1, 2010)
- Frank Lautenberg (June 6, 2013)

Presidents who have lain in repose in the East Room of the White House

- William Henry Harrison (April 4–7, 1841)
- Zachary Taylor (July 10–13, 1850)
- Abraham Lincoln (April 19–21, 1865)
- William McKinley (September 16–17, 1901)
- Warren G. Harding (August 7–8, 1923)
- Franklin D. Roosevelt (April 14, 1945)
- John F. Kennedy (November 23–24, 1963)

Supreme Court Justices who have lain in state in the Old Senate Chamber at the United States Capitol

- Salmon P. Chase (May 11, 1873)

Supreme Court Justices who have lain in repose in the Great Hall at the United States Supreme Court Building

- Earl Warren (July 11–12, 1974)
- Thurgood Marshall (January 27, 1993)
- Warren E. Burger (June 28, 1995)
- William J. Brennan Jr. (July 28, 1997)
- Harry Blackmun (March 8, 1999)
- William Rehnquist (September 6–7, 2005)
- Antonin Scalia (February 19, 2016)
- John Paul Stevens (July 22, 2019)
- Ruth Bader Ginsburg (September 23–24, 2020*)
- Sandra Day O'Connor (December 18, 2023)

(*) - Was laid atop the East Front steps during public viewing hours, as this was during the COVID-19 pandemic in the United States, when various restrictions on gatherings were imposed.

== Funeral arrangements ==
Each president living, sitting or former, is generally expected to have funeral plans in place on becoming president. The Military District of Washington (MDW) has primary responsibility in overseeing state funerals and in all cases, must strictly follow the outline of a 138-page planning document. Since the September 11, 2001 attacks, state funerals are designated by the Department of Homeland Security (DHS) a National Special Security Event (NSSE), making the United States Secret Service in charge of security.

== See also ==
- Death and two state funerals of Kalākaua
- Death and state funeral of Liliuokalani
- List of state funerals of former U.S. Presidents

== Works cited ==
- Associated Press (1963). The Torch is Passed. New York: Associated Press.
- NBC News (1966). There Was a President. New York: Random House.
- The New York Times (2003). Semple, Robert B. Jr. (ed.). Four days in November. New York: St. Martin's Press.
- Sandburg, Carl (1936). Abraham Lincoln: The War Years IV. Harcourt, Brace & World. ISBN 0-7812-6171-6.
- Swanson, James (2006). Manhunt: The 12-Day Chase for Lincoln's Killer. Harper Collins. ISBN 978-0-06-051849-3.
- United Press International; American Heritage (1964). Four Days. New York: American Heritage Pub. Co.
- White, Theodore Harold (1965). The Making of the President, 1964. New York: Atheneum.
