= Riderless horse =

Horse featured in funeral processions

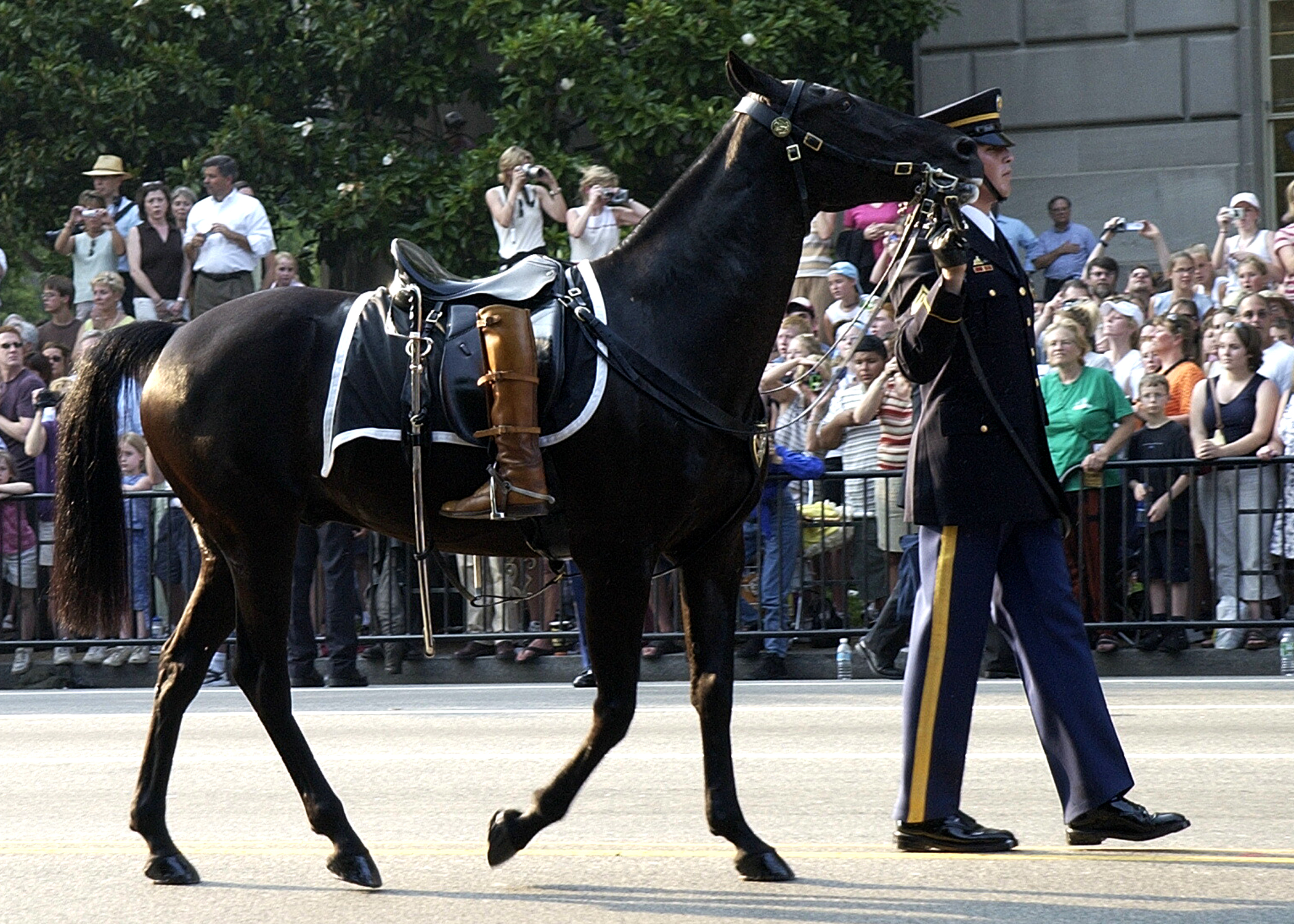
A riderless horse named Sergeant York during the funeral procession for the 40th President of the United States, Ronald Reagan, with President Reagan's boots reversed in the stirrups.

A riderless horse is a single horse without a rider and with boots reversed in the stirrups, which sometimes accompanies a funeral procession. The horse, sometimes caparisoned in black, follows the caisson carrying the casket. A riderless horse can also be featured in parades (military, police or civilian) to symbolize either deceased soldiers, police officers or equestrian athletes. A motorcycle can be used as a substitute for a horse. The motorcycle variant can be also used to symbolize deceased motorcyclists.

== History ==
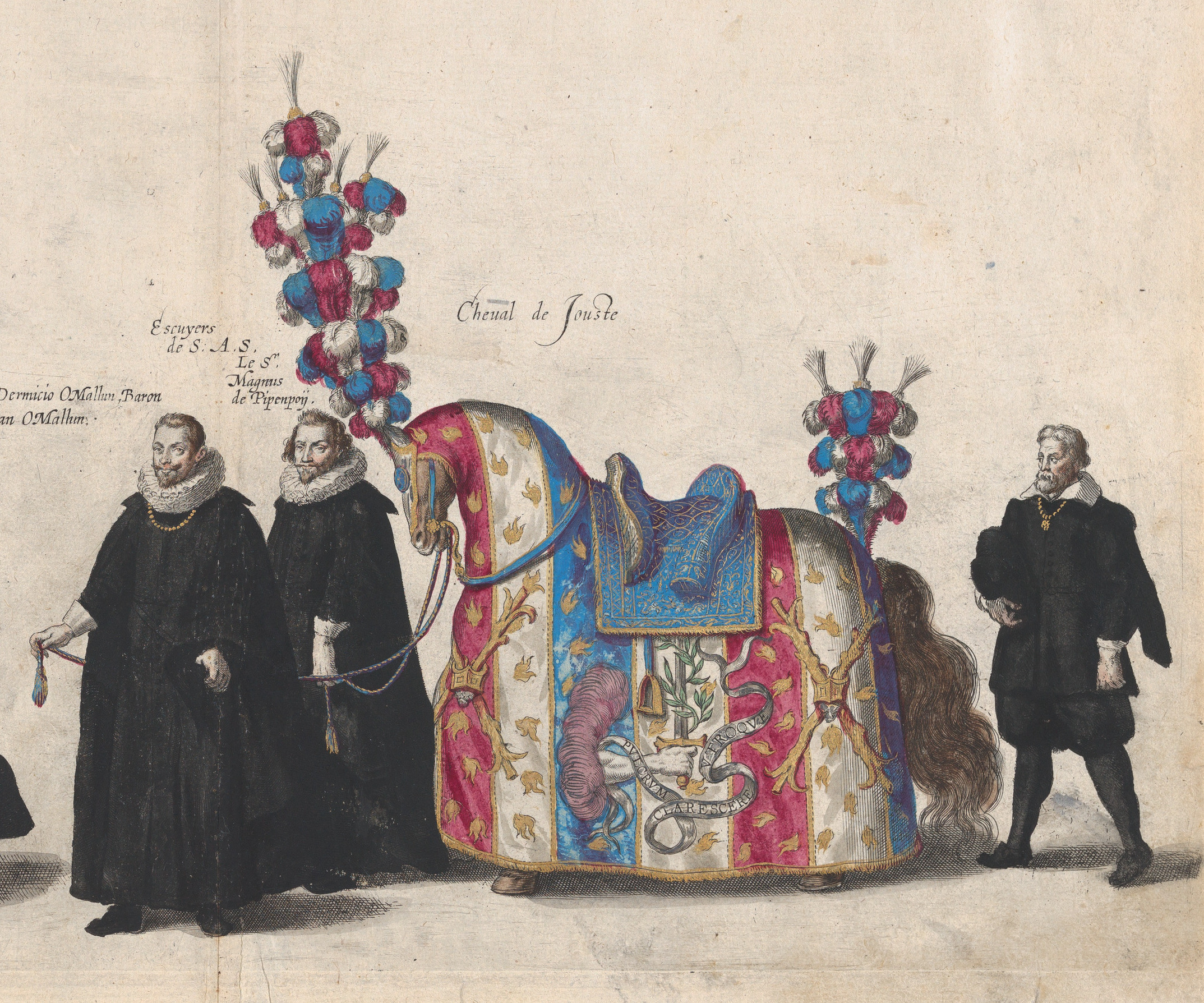
Riderless jousting horse of Albert VII, Archduke of Austria in his funeral procession, 1623 (etching with hand coloring by Jacob Franquart)

=== United States ===
In the United States, the riderless horse is part of funerals with military honors given to Army or Marine Corps officers at the rank of colonel or above, as well as funerals of presidents, who served as commander in chief.

Alexander Hamilton, who was Secretary of the Treasury (1789–1795) was the first American to be given the honor. Historian Ron Chernow noted that Hamilton's gray horse followed the casket "with the boots and spurs of its former rider reversed in the stirrups."

Abraham Lincoln, who was assassinated in 1865, was the first president of the United States to be officially honored by the inclusion of a caparisoned horse in his funeral cortege, although a letter from George Washington's personal secretary recorded the president's horse was part of the president's funeral, carrying his saddle, pistols, and holsters.

=== Australia ===
In Australia, a riderless horse known as the 'Lone Charger' sometimes leads the annual Anzac Day marches.

== Notable horses ==
=== Old Bob ===
In 1865, Abraham Lincoln was honored by the inclusion of a riderless horse at his funeral. When Lincoln's funeral train reached Springfield, Illinois, his horse, Old Bob, who was draped in a black mourning blanket, followed the procession and led mourners to Lincoln's burial spot.

=== Black Jack ===
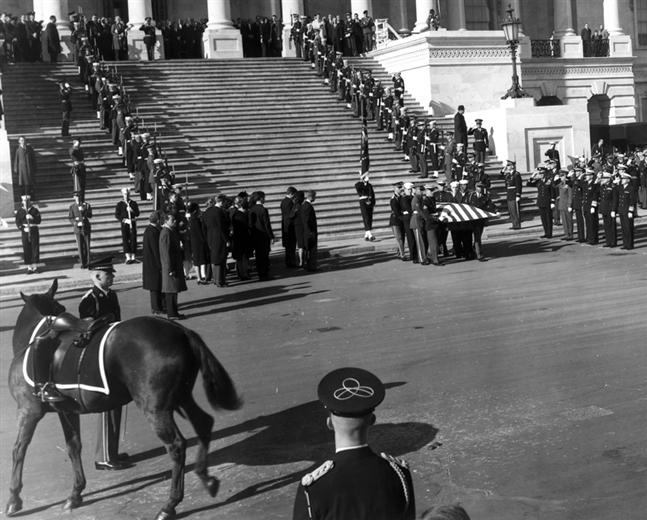
Black Jack in John F. Kennedy's funeral procession

Black Jack was a half-Morgan named for General of the Armies John "Black Jack" Pershing. Black Jack took part in the state funerals of Presidents John F. Kennedy (1963), Herbert Hoover (1964), and Lyndon Johnson (1973), and General of the Army Douglas MacArthur (1964).

=== Dolly ===
"Dolly" was the 22 year old charger (whose official name was Octave) of Admiral of the Fleet The Earl Mountbatten of Burma in his capacity as Colonel of the Life Guards. Following the assassination of Lord Mountbatten by the IRA in Mullaghmore, Dolly served as the riderless horse in the funeral procession being led ahead the head of the gun carriage with the Lord Mountbatten's boots (from his Colonel's uniform) reversed in the stirrups on 5 September 1979.

=== Sergeant York ===
Sergeant York was formerly known as "Allaboard Jules", a racing standardbred gelding. He was renamed (in honor of famous WWI soldier Alvin C. York) when he was accepted into the military in 1997. He served as the riderless horse in President Ronald Reagan's funeral procession, walking behind the caisson bearing Reagan's flag-draped casket. In the stirrups were President Reagan's personal riding boots.

He was foaled in 1991, sired by Royce and out of the mare Amtrak Collins sired by Computer. He is a descendant of the great standardbred racing stallions Albatross, Tar Heel and Adios.

== See also ==
- Honor guard
- Military funeral
- Military rites
- Missing man formation
- State funeral
