= Death and state funeral of Ronald Reagan =

2004 funeral of the 40th U.S. president

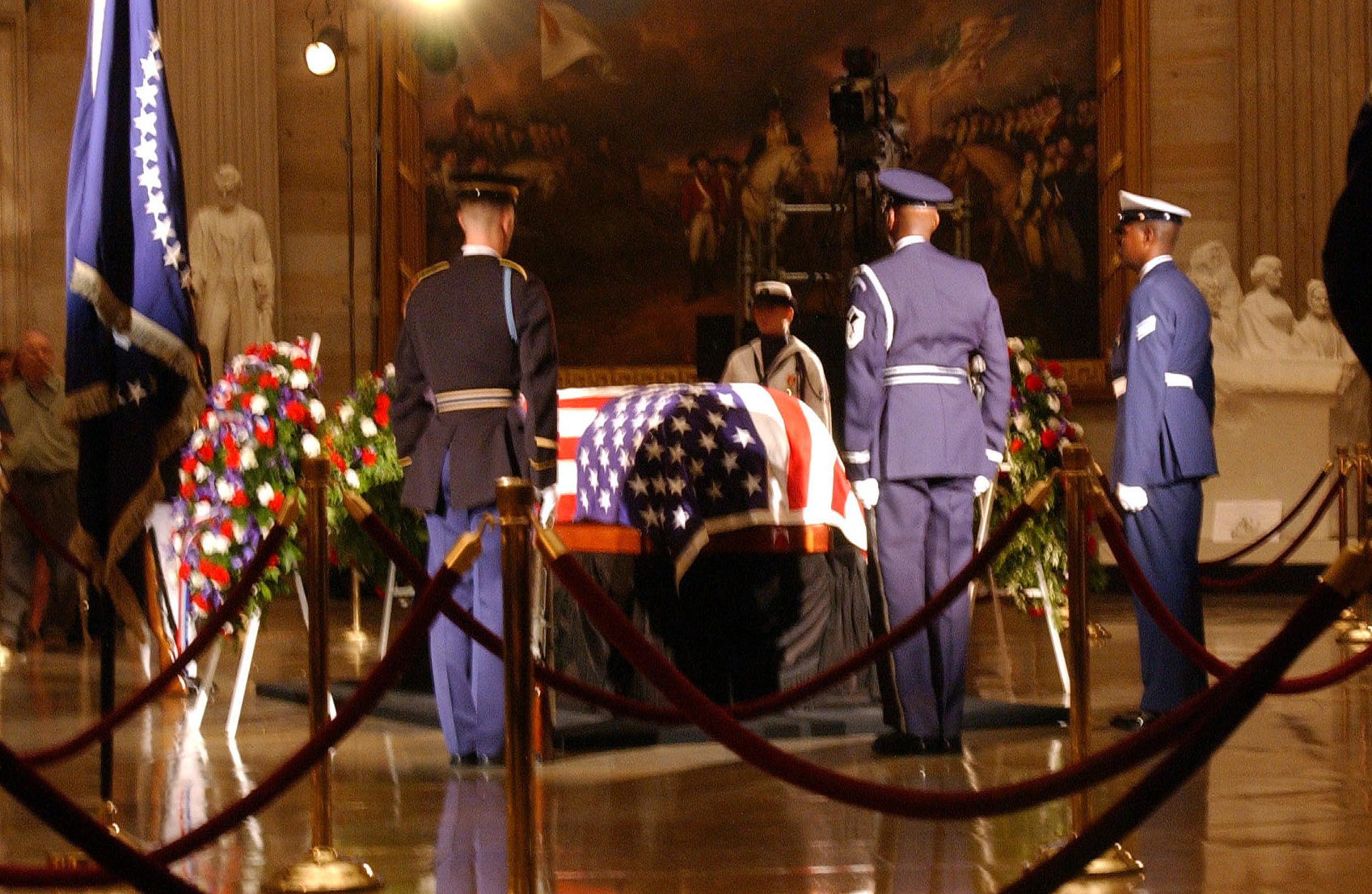
- Reagan lies in state in the U.S. Capitol rotunda.
- Date: June 9–11, 2004 (state funeral); June 5–July 3, 2004 (mourning period)
- Location: Capitol Rotunda, U.S. Capitol, Washington, D.C.; 34.25899°N 118.82043°W
- Organized by: JTF-NCR; U.S. Department of Defense
- Participants: Gerald Ford; Jimmy Carter; George H. W. Bush; Bill Clinton; George W. Bush; Dick Cheney; Members of the 108th United States Congress; Margaret Thatcher; Mikhail Gorbachev; Brian Mulroney

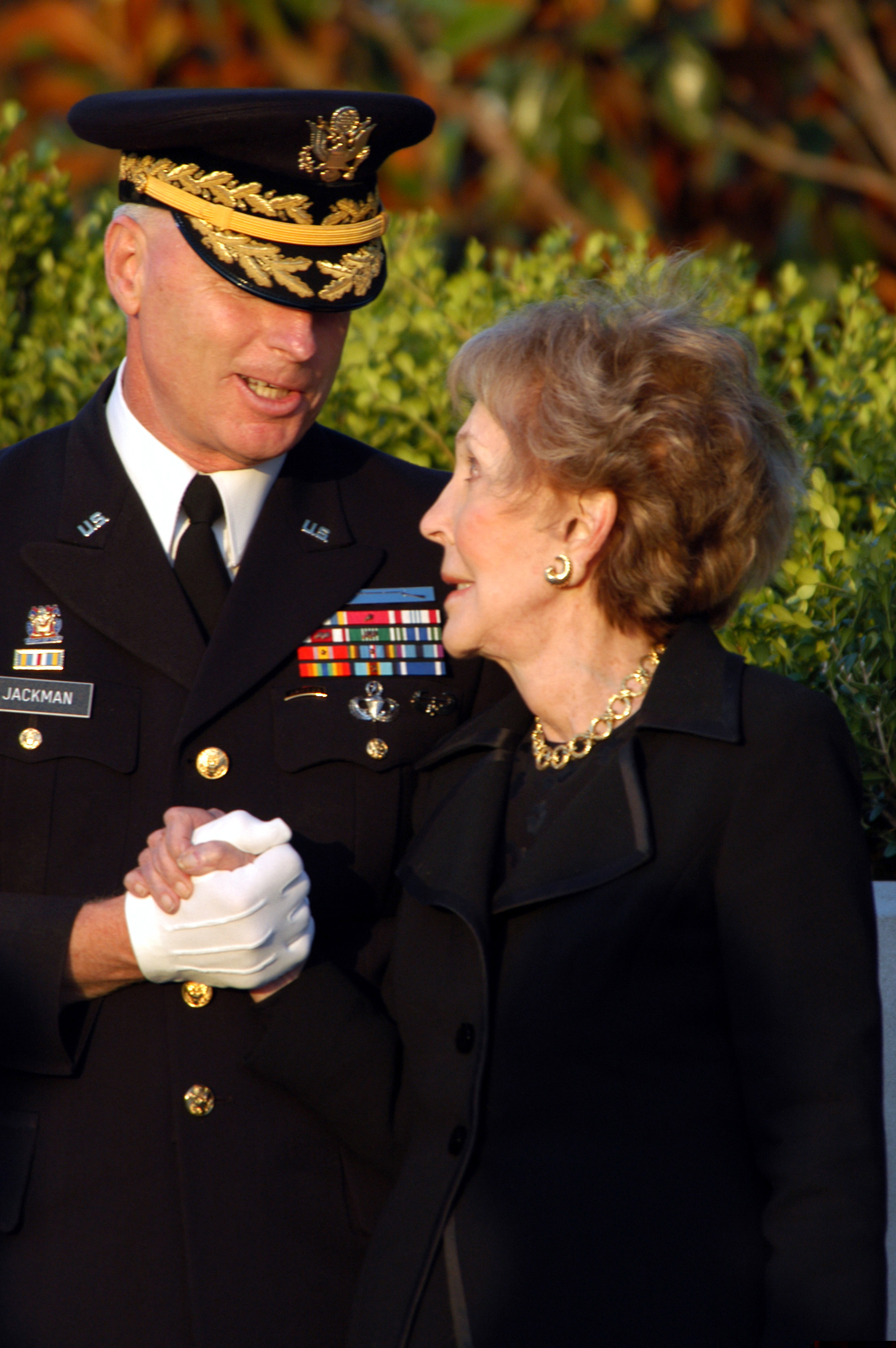
During the week's events Nancy Reagan was escorted in public by U.S. Army Major General Galen B. Jackman.

On June 5, 2004, Ronald Reagan, the 40th president of the United States and the 33rd governor of California, died after having Alzheimer's disease for a decade, diagnosed in 1994. Reagan was the first former U.S. president to die in 10 years since Richard Nixon in 1994. At the age of 93 years, 120 days, Reagan was the longest-lived U.S. president in history at the time of his death, a record which has since been surpassed by Gerald Ford, George H. W. Bush, and Jimmy Carter. His seven-day state funeral followed. After Reagan's death, his body was taken from his Bel Air home to the Kingsley and Gates Funeral Home in Santa Monica, California, to prepare the body for burial. On June 7, Reagan's casket was transported by hearse and displayed at the Ronald Reagan Presidential Library in Simi Valley, California, then flown to Washington, D.C., on June 9 for a service, public viewing and tributes at the U.S. Capitol.

After lying in state for 34 hours in the Capitol rotunda, a state funeral service was conducted at Washington National Cathedral on June 11, the day when President George W. Bush declared a national day of mourning. Later that day, after the service, Reagan's casket was transported back to California for interment at the Reagan Presidential Library. The state funeral was executed by the Military District of Washington (MDW).

Reagan was the first former U.S. president to die during the presidency of George W. Bush and the first to die in the twenty-first century, followed by Gerald Ford, George H. W. Bush, and Jimmy Carter.

== Death ==
On the morning of June 5, 2004, there were reports that Reagan's health had significantly deteriorated, following ten years of Alzheimer's disease. According to Reagan's daughter, Patti Davis, "At the last moment, when his breathing told us this was it, he opened his eyes and looked straight at my mother. Eyes that hadn't opened for days did, and they weren't chalky or vague. They were clear and blue and full of love. If a death can be lovely, his was". His wife, former first lady Nancy Reagan told him that the moment was "the greatest gift you could have given me." He died of pneumonia at his home, 668 St. Cloud Road, in the Bel-Air district of Los Angeles, at 1:09 PM PDT, at the age of 93.

President George W. Bush was in Paris when Reagan died and acknowledged the death in a press conference.

This is a sad hour in the life of America. A great American life has come to an end. I have just spoken to Nancy Reagan. On behalf of our whole nation, Laura and I offered her and the Reagan family our prayers and our condolences. Ronald Reagan won America's respect with his greatness, and won its love with his goodness. He had the confidence that comes with conviction, the strength that comes with character, the grace that comes with humility, and the humor that comes with wisdom. He leaves behind a nation he restored and a world he helped save. During the years of President Reagan, America laid to rest an era of division and self-doubt. And because of his leadership, the world laid to rest an era of fear and tyranny. Now, in laying our leader to rest, we say thank you. He always told us that for America, the best was yet to come. We comfort ourselves in the knowledge that this is true for him, too. His work is done, and now a shining city awaits him. May God bless Ronald Reagan.

— President George W. Bush, June 5, 2004

Bush's competitor for the 2004 presidential election, the Democratic nominee John Kerry, also commented on Reagan's death, saying "He was our oldest president . . . but he made America young again."

Various U.S. flags at the White House, across the United States, and around the world over official U.S. installations and operating locations, were ordered to be flown at half-staff for 30 days in a presidential proclamation by President Bush. In the announcement of Reagan's death, Bush also declared June 11 as a National Day of Mourning.

Some of the early international tributes to Reagan included those of Queen Elizabeth II, former British prime minister Margaret Thatcher, former Soviet Union Leader Mikhail Gorbachev (also attending the funeral), British prime minister Tony Blair, former Canadian prime ministers Brian Mulroney and Paul Martin, and French president Jacques Chirac. Martin advised Governor General Adrienne Clarkson to order all flags across Canada and at all Canadian diplomatic missions in the United States flown to half-staff on the 11th as well, in sympathy with the U.S.'s National Day of Mourning. In Germany, Chancellor Gerhard Schröder ordered German flags flown at half-staff above government buildings on the 11th as well.

Tributes and condolences were left at U.S. embassies and consulates overseas, as well as at places around the country significant to Reagan's life, including his presidential library, his birthplace in Tampico, Illinois, the funeral home where his body was taken after he died, and the Tau Kappa Epsilon fraternity house in Eureka, Illinois. The electronic signs at the Massachusetts Turnpike flashed the message "God Speed President Reagan."

After Reagan's death, campaigning for the ongoing 2004 United States elections was considered disrespectful during a time of mourning, and was suspended. The 2004 Canadian federal election was also to be held; prime minister and Liberal Party leader Paul Martin, Opposition Leader and Conservative Party leader Stephen Harper, and New Democratic Party Leader Jack Layton suspended their campaigns, citing respect for Reagan.

== Funeral events ==
=== Reagan Library ===
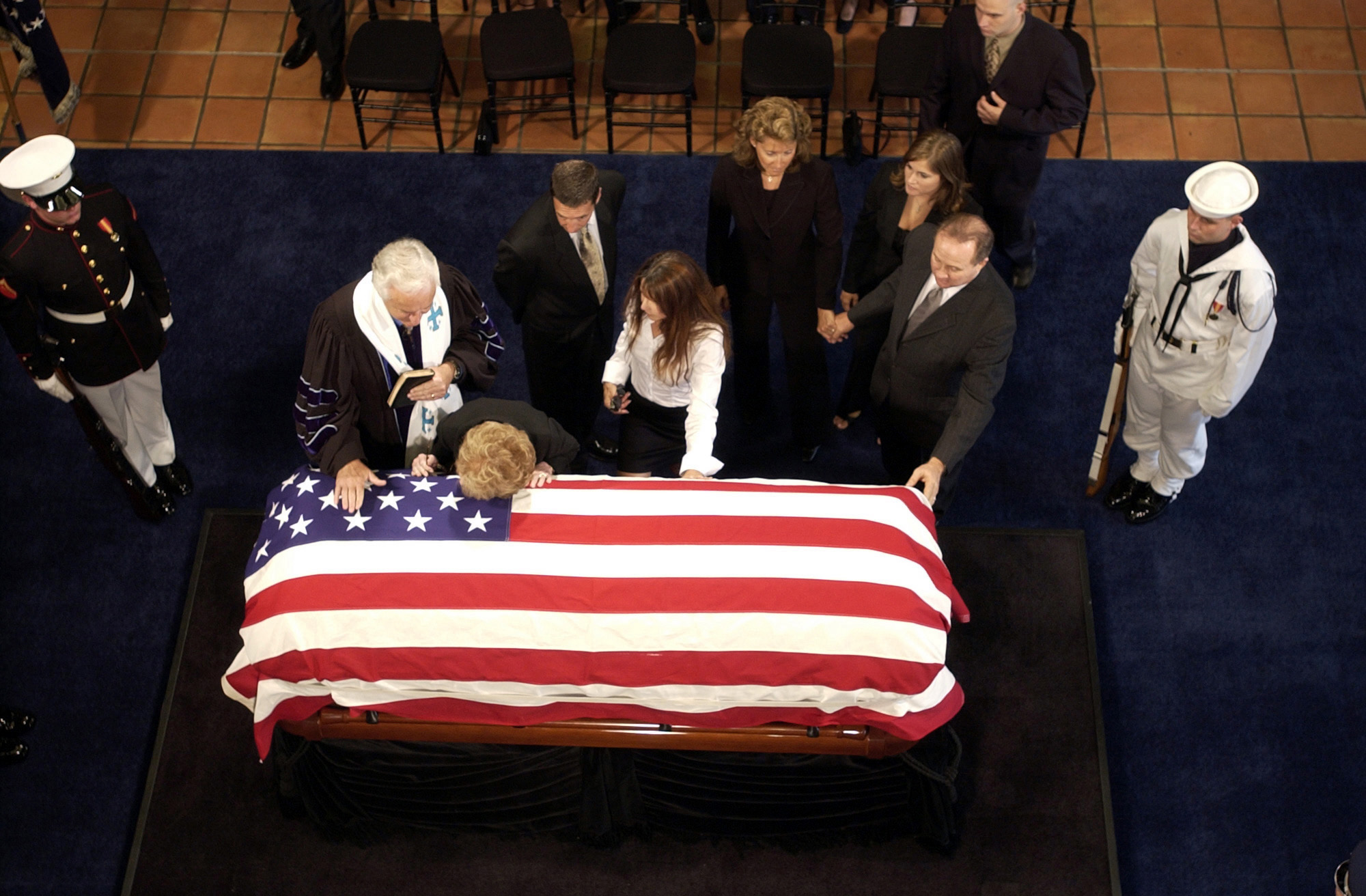
Nancy Reagan leans her head on her husband's casket at his presidential library.

On June 7, Reagan's body was removed from the funeral home and driven in a 20-mile-per-hour (32 km/h) motorcade, by hearse, to the Ronald Reagan Presidential Library in Simi Valley.

Reagan's remains were presented in a Marsellus Masterpiece model purchased from a funeral home in Alhambra. It was carried by a military honor guard representing all branches of the United States Armed Forces into the lobby of the library to lie in repose. There, a brief family service was conducted by the Reverend Dr. Michael H. Wenning, former pastor of Bel Air Church, where Reagan worshipped. When the prayer service concluded, Nancy Reagan and her family approached the casket, where Nancy laid her head on it. After the family left, the doors of the presidential library opened, and the public began filing in at a rate of 2,000 an hour throughout the night. In all, about 108,000 people visited the presidential library to see the casket.

=== Departure to Washington ===
On June 9, Reagan's casket was removed from the presidential library and driven in a motorcade to NAS Point Mugu in Oxnard, California; it was the same airfield Reagan flew into and out of during his presidency when visiting his California ranch. SAM 28000, one of the two Boeing 747-200s, which usually serves the president as Air Force One, arrived to transport the casket to Washington. Thousands of people gathered to witness the plane's departure. Just before she boarded the VC-25A Presidential Aircraft, Nancy Reagan waved to the crowd with her military escort at her side. The plane lifted off at about 9:40 am PST.

=== Events in Washington ===
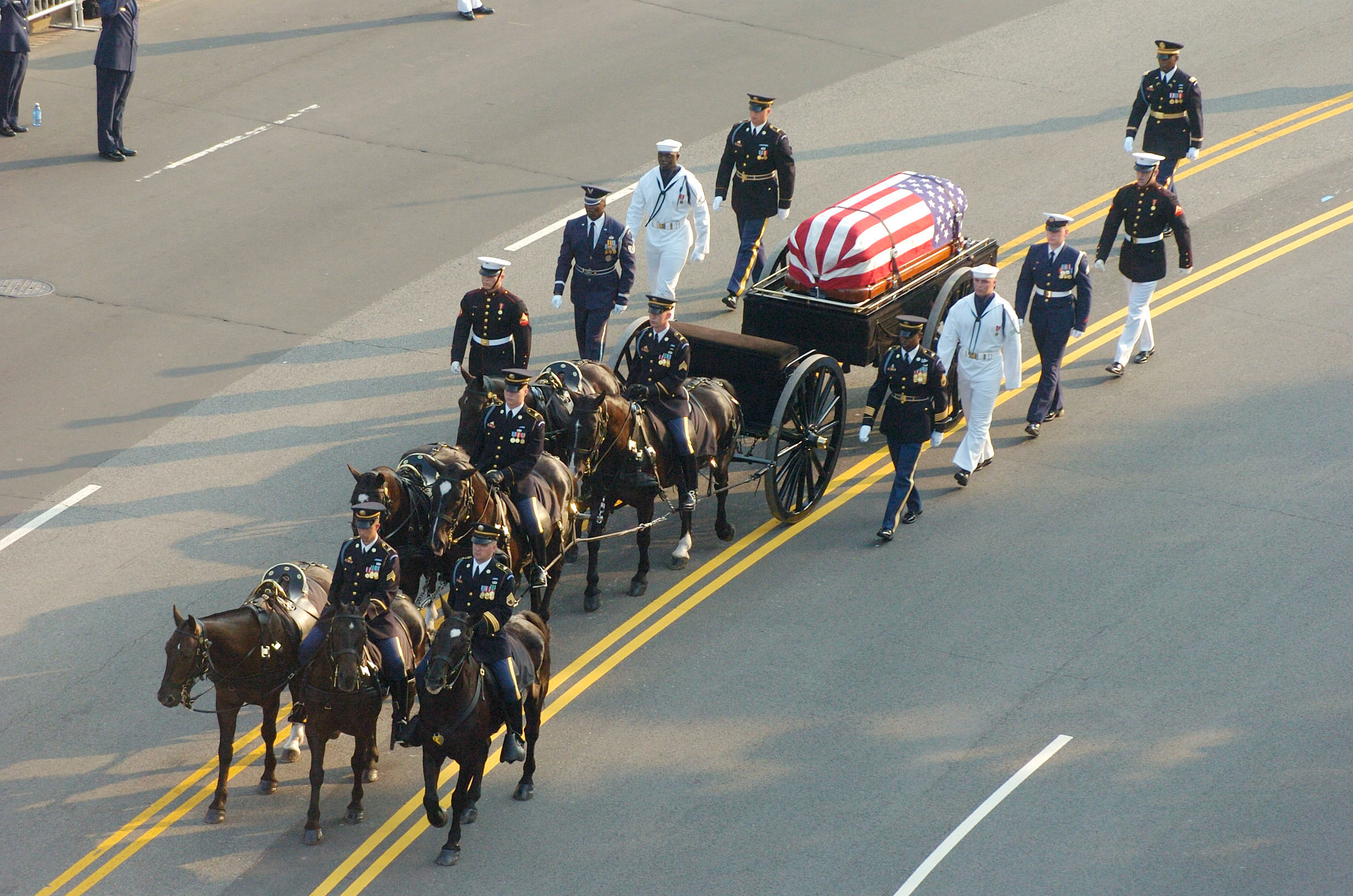
The caisson with President Reagan's casket on Constitution Avenue, marching to the Capitol

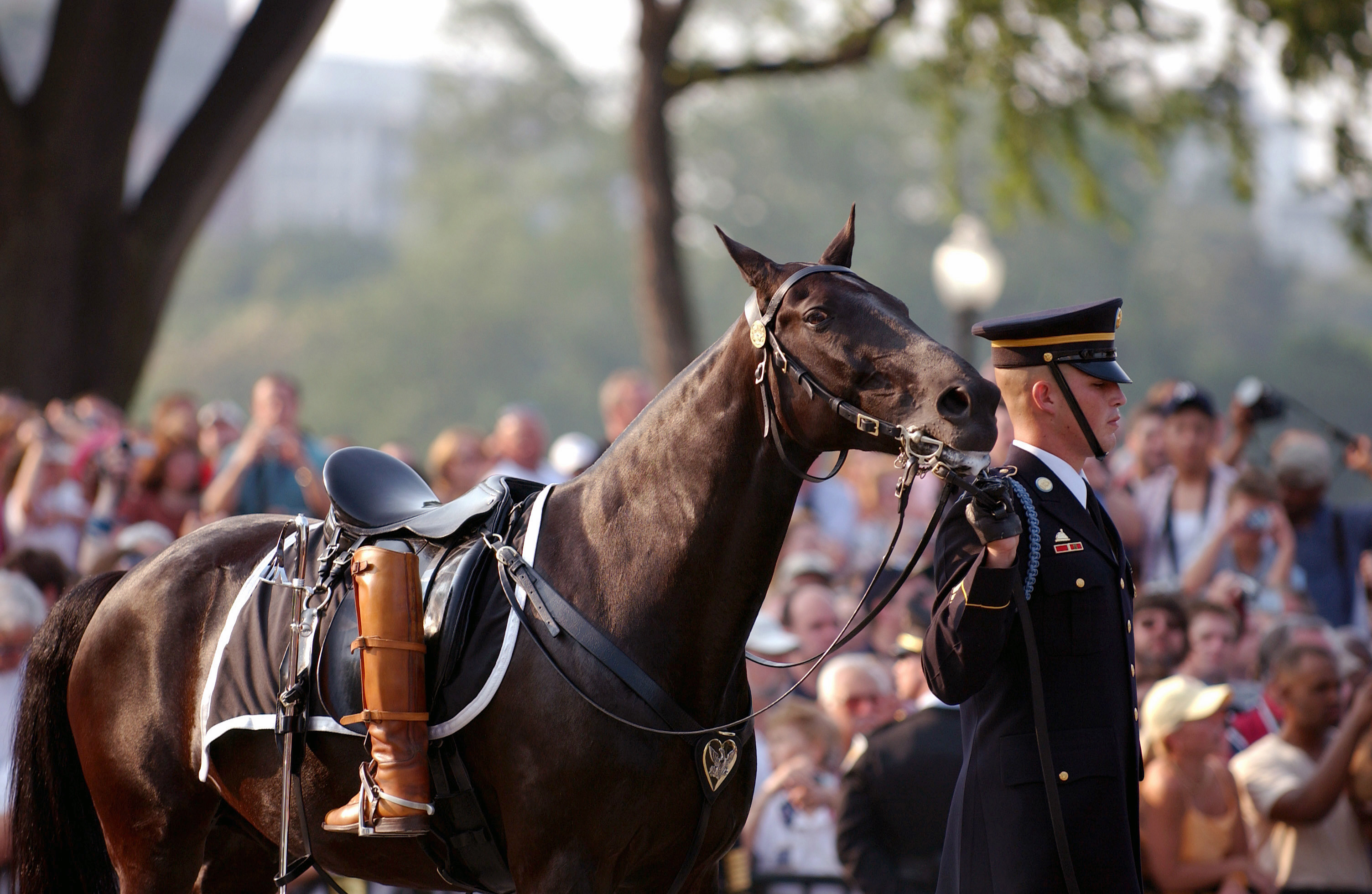
The riderless horse, Sergeant York, with Reagan's own riding boots reversed in the stirrups

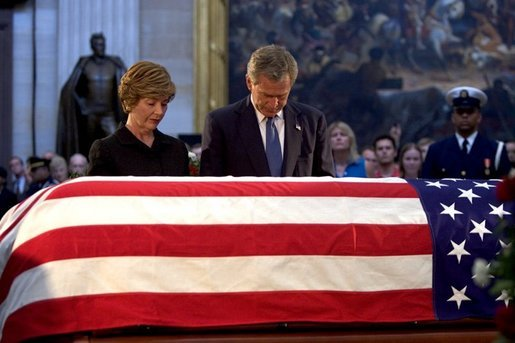
The Bushes pay their respects to Reagan.

In Washington, D.C., members of Congress, and much of the public, paid tribute to Reagan immediately after his death and throughout his funeral.

==== Funeral procession ====
Events in the capital began when Reagan's casket arrived at Andrews Air Force Base in Maryland. It was removed from the plane, driven by hearse in a procession through the Maryland and Virginia suburbs and the nation's capital, across the Arlington Memorial Bridge, and onto Constitution Avenue.

Just before the plane arrived at Andrews AFB, the U.S. Capitol was evacuated for a brief period, when a plane carrying Kentucky Governor Ernie Fletcher was reported off course and created a scare by entering restricted airspace; the transponder on Fletcher's plane malfunctioned, leading officials at Reagan National Airport to report an unauthorized aircraft entering restricted airspace. Two U.S. Air Force F-15 fighters were dispatched to investigate, and Fletcher's plane was escorted to its destination by two UH-60 Black Hawk helicopters. The plane, a 33-year-old Beechcraft King Air, was the oldest of its model still in operation. An investigation by the Federal Aviation Administration (FAA) found that the crew of Fletcher's plane maintained radio contact with air traffic officials and received clearance to enter the restricted air space. The investigation determined that miscommunication by air traffic controllers sparked the panic. Though the incident did not affect further funeral events, in the aftermath the FAA adopted policies to prevent future errors of a similar nature.

Near the Ellipse, and within sight of the White House, the hearse halted and Reagan's body was transferred to a horse-drawn caisson for the procession down Constitution Avenue to Capitol Hill. Nancy Reagan stepped out of her limousine to witness the casket's transfer; she was met with a warm greeting, including applause. The cortege began the 45-minute journey just after 6:00 pm EST, with the Reagan family following in limousines. Military units escorted the caisson as it made its way to the sounds of muffled drums. Behind the caisson was a riderless horse named Sergeant York, carrying Reagan's riding boots reversed in the stirrups. The caisson paused at 4th Street and Constitution Avenue, where 21 F-15s from Seymour Johnson Air Force Base in North Carolina, flew over in missing man formation.

==== Capitol Hill ====
The caisson stopped when it arrived at Capitol Hill; military units removed the casket, and "Hail to the Chief" was played amidst a 21-gun salute. The casket was carried up the west front steps of the Capitol, mainly because Reagan was first inaugurated there and he wanted to face west, toward California. Two teams of military pallbearers carried the casket up the steps of the Capitol to "The Battle Hymn of the Republic".

When the casket reached the top of the steps, Nancy Reagan and her military escort met it. As the casket passed them, Nancy momentarily pulled away from her escort, reached out, and touched the casket. They followed it inside to the rotunda.

The casket was placed under the rotunda, where it lay in state on Abraham Lincoln's catafalque. An evening memorial service then took place, with dignitaries primarily composed of Members of Congress, members of the United States Supreme Court, and the diplomatic corps; the Reverend Daniel Coughlin, Chaplain of the House of Representatives, gave the invocation. Eulogies were then delivered by Senate President pro tempore Ted Stevens, House Speaker Dennis Hastert, and Vice President Dick Cheney.

After the eulogies, the three speakers each laid a wreath at the casket, and the Senate Chaplain, Pastor Barry Black, gave the benediction. Cheney escorted Nancy Reagan to the casket, where she said her goodbyes. The dignitaries in the room paid their respects during the next half-hour. In a rare instance, the doors of the Capitol were then opened to the public, who stood in lines stretching many blocks to view the casket.

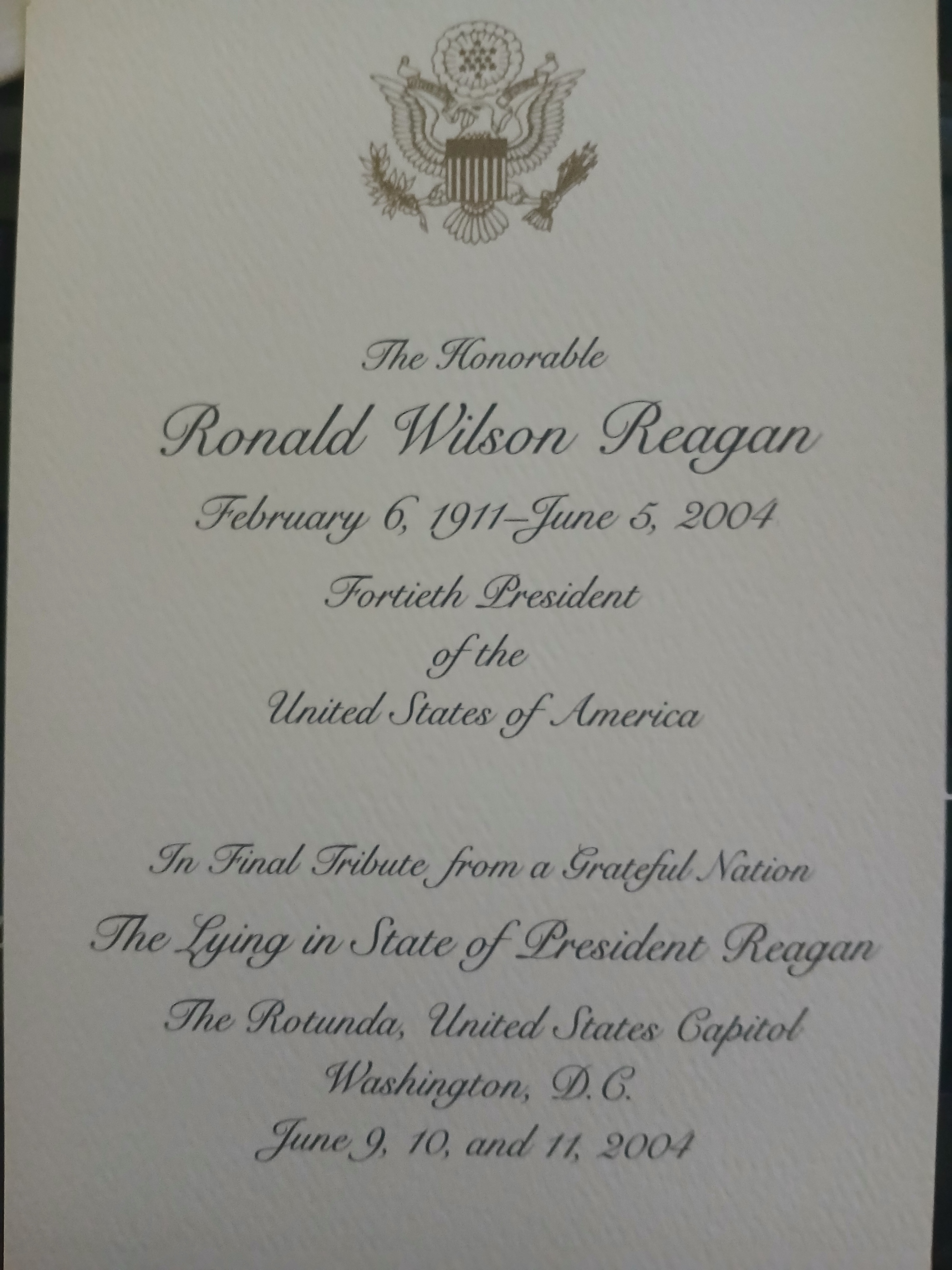
In memoriam card given to members of the public at the public viewing for Ronald Reagan

==== Public viewing ====
The general public stood in long lines waiting for a turn to pay their respects to the president. About 5,000 per hour passed the casket, after waiting up to seven hours. In all, 104,684 paid their respects when Reagan lay in state.

After returning to Washington following the G8 summit in Sea Island, Georgia, President George W. Bush and First Lady Laura Bush visited the rotunda to pay their respects. Many world leaders did the same, including interim Iraqi president Ghazi al-Yawer, former Polish president Lech Wałęsa, Gorbachev, and Thatcher, Reagan's good friend and associate.

While Reagan's casket lay in state, Nancy Reagan and her family took up temporary residence in Blair House, the official residence of guests of the president of the United States. There, she was greeted by additional dignitaries and public figures. During a visit from Thatcher, the former prime minister wrote in the Blair House condolence book, "To Ronnie, Well done, thou good and faithful servant."

=== State funeral service ===
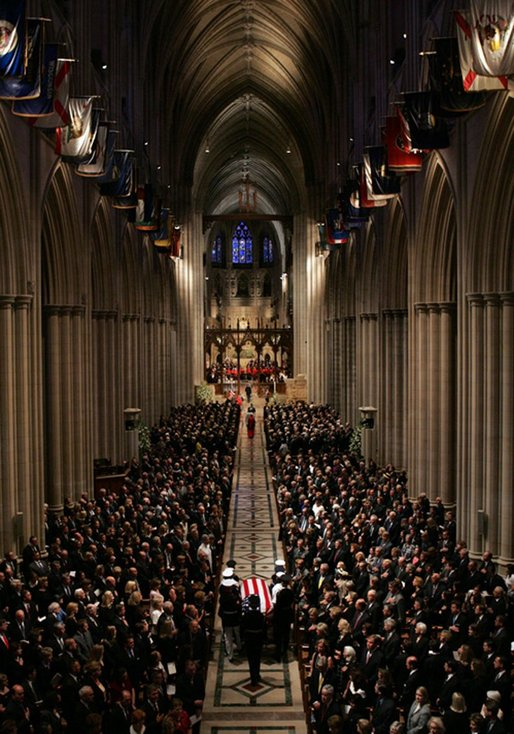
Reagan's casket is carried into the Washington National Cathedral, June 11.

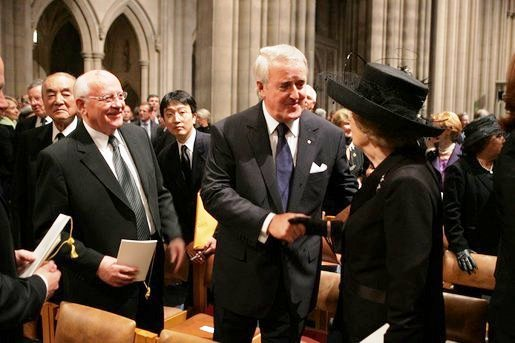
Yasuhiro Nakasone (far left), Mikhail Gorbachev (second from left), Brian Mulroney (center), and Margaret Thatcher (right) attend the service.

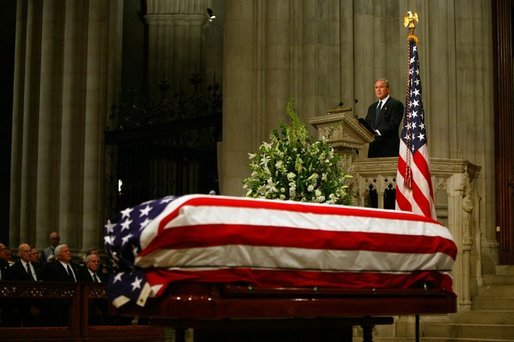
President Bush delivers a eulogy.

After 34 hours of lying in state, the doors of the Capitol were closed to the public and Nancy Reagan was escorted in, where she had a moment alone with the casket. A military honor guard entered and carried it down the west steps of the Capitol to a 21-gun salute where Nancy, holding her hand over her heart, met it. After it was placed in a hearse, the motorcade departed on the five-mile-trip (8 km) to the Washington National Cathedral, where the state funeral service was to be held; crowds lined the route of the cortege as the hearse made its way.

==== Dignitaries ====
About 4,000 people gathered at the cathedral for the service, including President and Mrs. Bush, former presidents George H. W. and Barbara Bush, Gerald and Betty Ford, Jimmy and Rosalynn Carter, and Bill and Hillary Clinton. Members of Congress and past and present governors were also present.

Foreign dignitaries attended as well, coming from 167 nations. The dignitaries included more than 40 past and present heads of state and government, UN Secretary General Kofi Annan and President of the European Commission, Romano Prodi. Leading the dignitaries were former president of the Soviet Union, Mikhail Gorbachev, former prime minister of the United Kingdom, Margaret Thatcher, former prime minister of Canada, Brian Mulroney, and the Prince of Wales, Prince Charles (representing Queen Elizabeth II).

Other notable world leaders included: Canadian governor general Adrienne Clarkson, British Prime Minister Tony Blair and his wife Cherie, German Chancellor Gerhard Schröder, Russian President Vladimir Putin, Japanese prime minister Junichiro Koizumi, former Japanese prime minister Yasuhiro Nakasone, former French president Valéry Giscard d'Estaing, former Polish president Lech Wałęsa, former Finnish president Mauno Koivisto, Romanian president Ion Iliescu, Latvian president Vaira Vīķe-Freiberga, acting president of Lithuania Artūras Paulauskas, Italian prime minister Silvio Berlusconi, King Abdullah II of Jordan, Governor-General of Australia Michael Jeffery, Turkish prime minister Recep Tayyip Erdogan as well as interim presidents Hamid Karzai of Afghanistan and Ghazi al-Yawer of Iraq, Czech president Václav Klaus and his predecessor Václav Havel, Cypriot president Tassos Papadopoulos, South African president Thabo Mbeki and Irish president Mary McAleese. Prodi, Blair, Schröder, Berlusconi, Putin, Karzai, King Abdullah, Erdogan, al-Yawer, Mbeki and many others had been at the G8 summit in Sea Island, Georgia, and later decided to extend their stay in the U.S. to attend the funeral. Schröder said about attending the funeral: "It is appropriate that the German chancellor says, 'Thank you,' and that is what I'm doing.'" For Karzai, the funeral was part of his week-long visit to the U.S. and it was the beginning of his visit to Washington. He scrapped a visit to the West Coast to visit the Afghan community there to attend the funeral. World leaders who attended the summit, but decided not to extend their stay in the U.S. to attend the funeral, paid tribute at the summit, including Canadian prime minister Paul Martin, French president Jacques Chirac and Irish prime minister Bertie Ahern, also president of the European Union. McAleese's presence had special significance, as she paid tribute to Reagan's Irish roots, recalling his visit to Ireland in 1984. In addition, Taiwan's president of the Control Yuan Fredrick Chien and Representative Chen Chien-jen attended the funeral.

The funeral for Reagan was the largest in the United States since that of John F. Kennedy in 1963. President Kennedy's daughter, Caroline, and her husband, Edwin Schlossberg, both attended.

==== Cathedral events ====
The motorcade arrived at the Cathedral and Reagan's casket was removed. The bearers carrying it paused on the Cathedral steps, and an opening prayer was given by Bishop John Bryson Chane, Dean of the Washington National Cathedral. The casket was then carried down the aisle; the Reagan family followed and Nancy Reagan was escorted to her seat by President Bush. Rabbi Harold Kushner and United States Supreme Court Associate Justice Sandra Day O'Connor (the first female Supreme Court justice, whom Reagan appointed), then each gave a reading, which preceded the eulogies. O'Connor read the City upon a Hill text, which was noted by Reagan in many speeches of his. The choir then sang hymns—"Faire is the Heaven"; "O Love of God, How Strong and True", "Bring Us, O Lord"; "And I saw a New Heaven"—before Thatcher delivered the first eulogy. In view of her failing mental faculties following several small strokes, the message had been pre-recorded several months earlier and was broadcast throughout the Cathedral on plasma television screens. During the speech, Thatcher said, "We have lost a great president, a great American and a great man, and I have lost a dear friend."

Following Thatcher's eulogy, Mulroney delivered his, ending with: "In the presence of his beloved and indispensable Nancy, his children, his family, his friends and all of the American people that he so deeply revered, I say au revoir today to a gifted leader and historic president and a gracious human being."

Former president George H. W. Bush then spoke, his voice breaking at one point when describing Reagan; Bush had been Reagan's vice president from 1981 to 1989, and his successor as president. His son, President George W. Bush, was the last to give a eulogy, saying in part, "Ronald Reagan belongs to the ages now, but we preferred it when he belonged to us... In his last years he saw through a glass darkly. Now he sees his Savior face to face. And we look for that fine day when we will see him again, all weariness gone, clear of mind, strong and sure and smiling again, and the sorrow of this parting gone forever."

The Armed Forces Chorus (LTC John Clanton, Conductor) then sang "The Battle Hymn of the Republic" and Cardinal Theodore Edgar McCarrick, Catholic Archbishop of Washington, delivered a Bible reading from the Gospel of Matthew. The celebrant, former Missouri Senator the Reverend John Danforth, delivered the homily and Irish tenor Ronan Tynan sang songs such as "Ave Maria" and "Amazing Grace" at the request of Nancy Reagan. The Reverend Ted Eastman, former bishop of Maryland, delivered the benediction, flanked by Father Danforth and Bishop Chane.

=== Interment at the Reagan Library ===
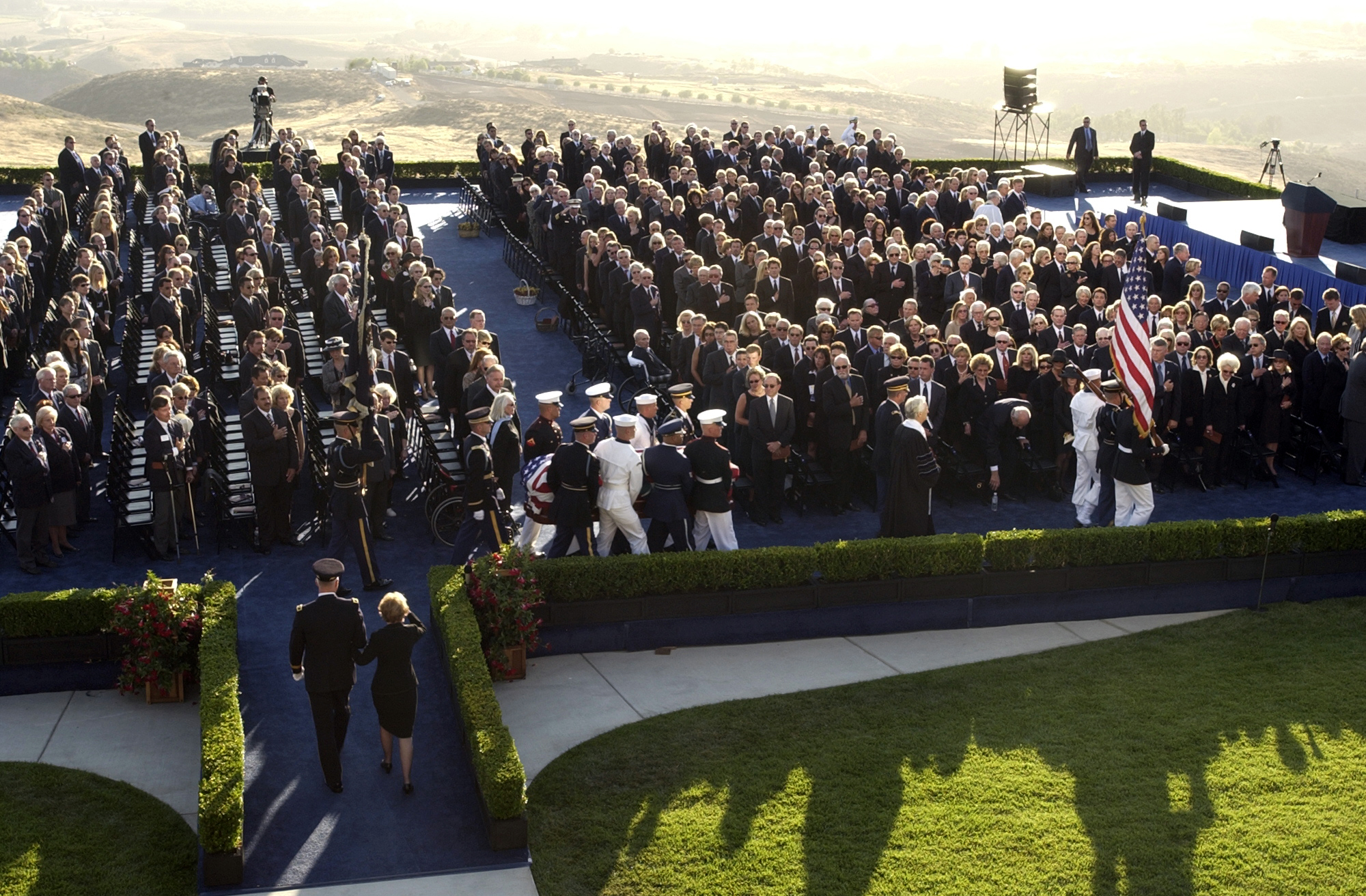
The memorial service at the Ronald Reagan Presidential Library

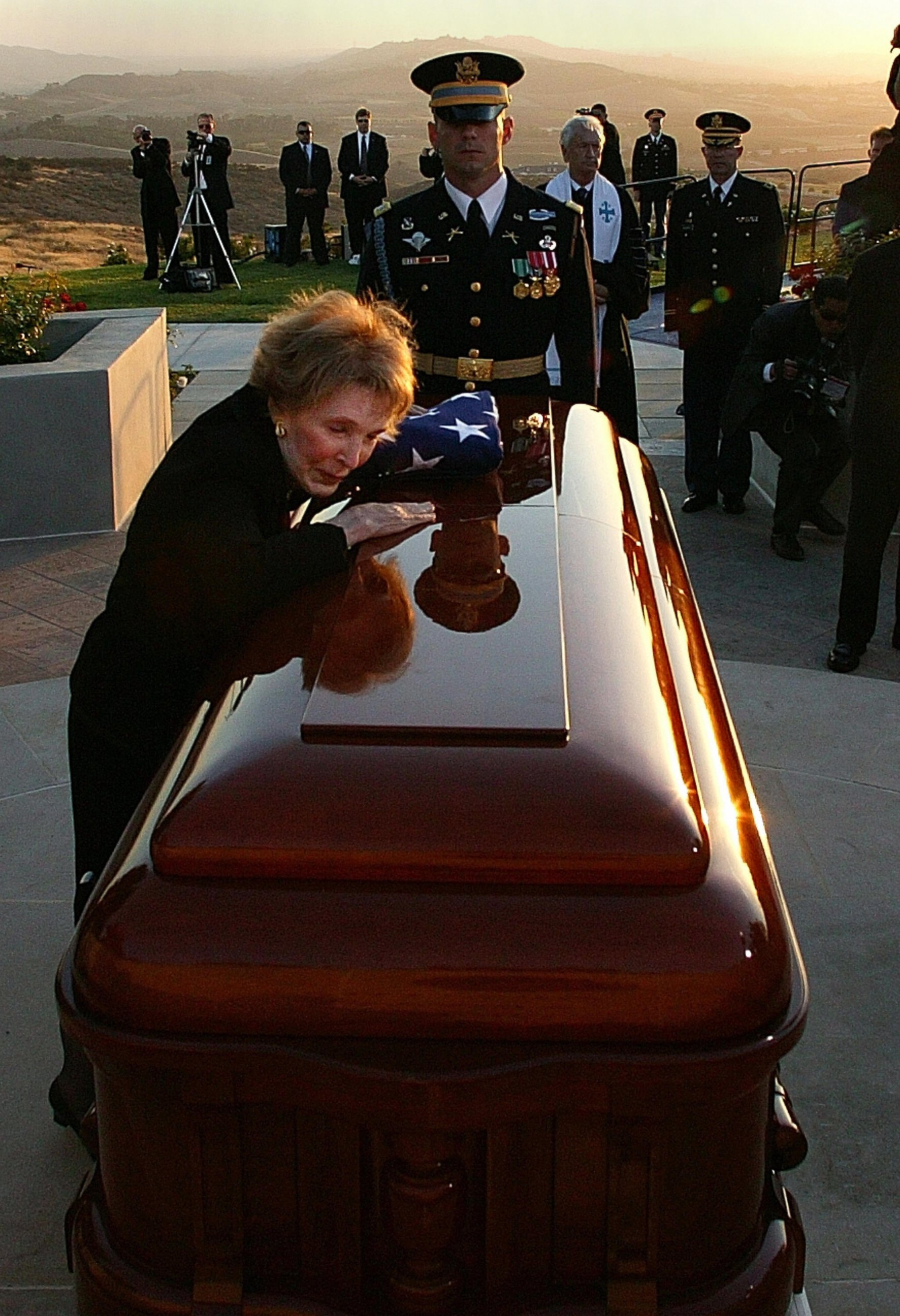
Nancy Reagan with Reagan's casket just before the interment

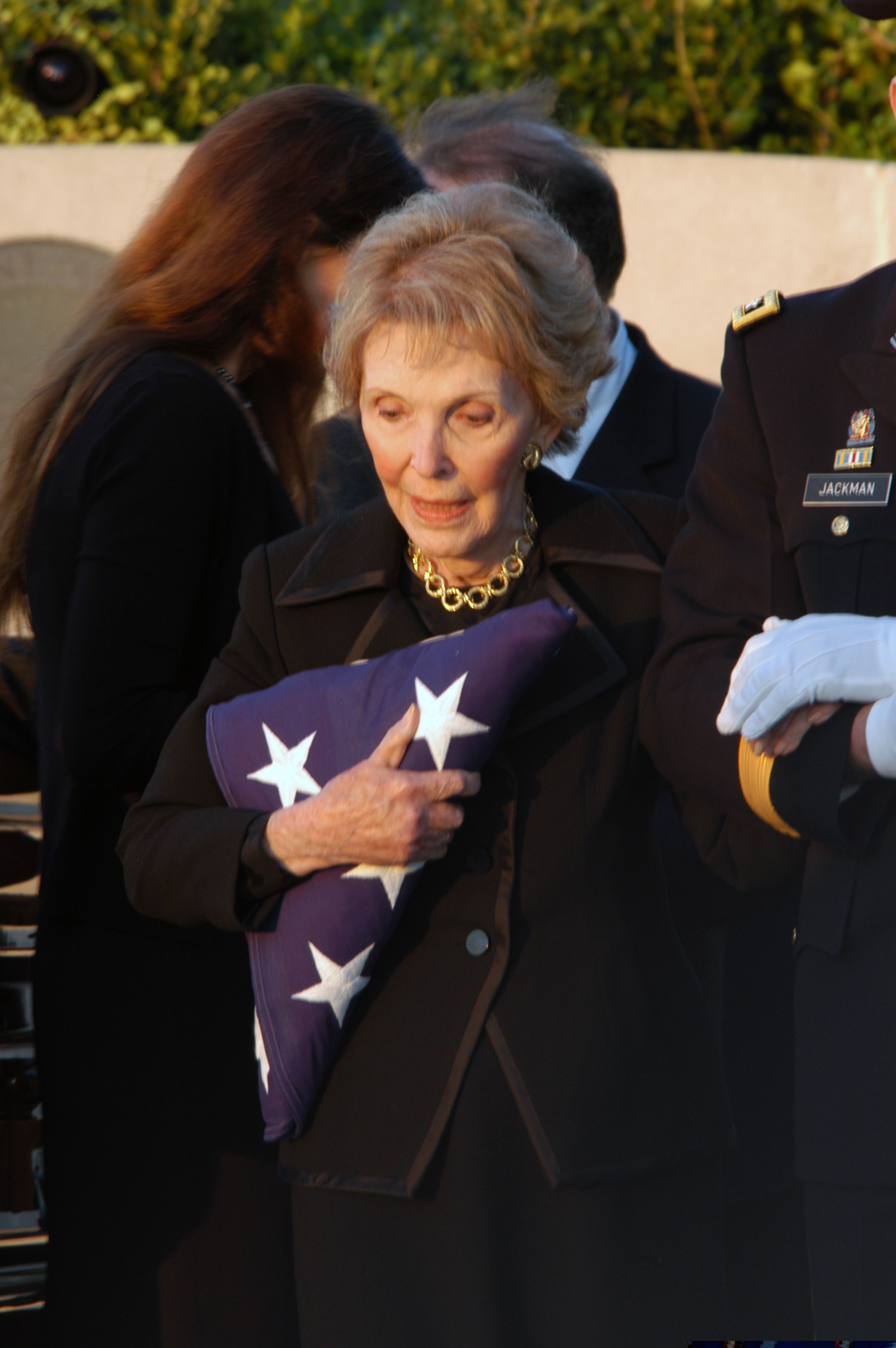
Nancy Reagan leaving the gravesite

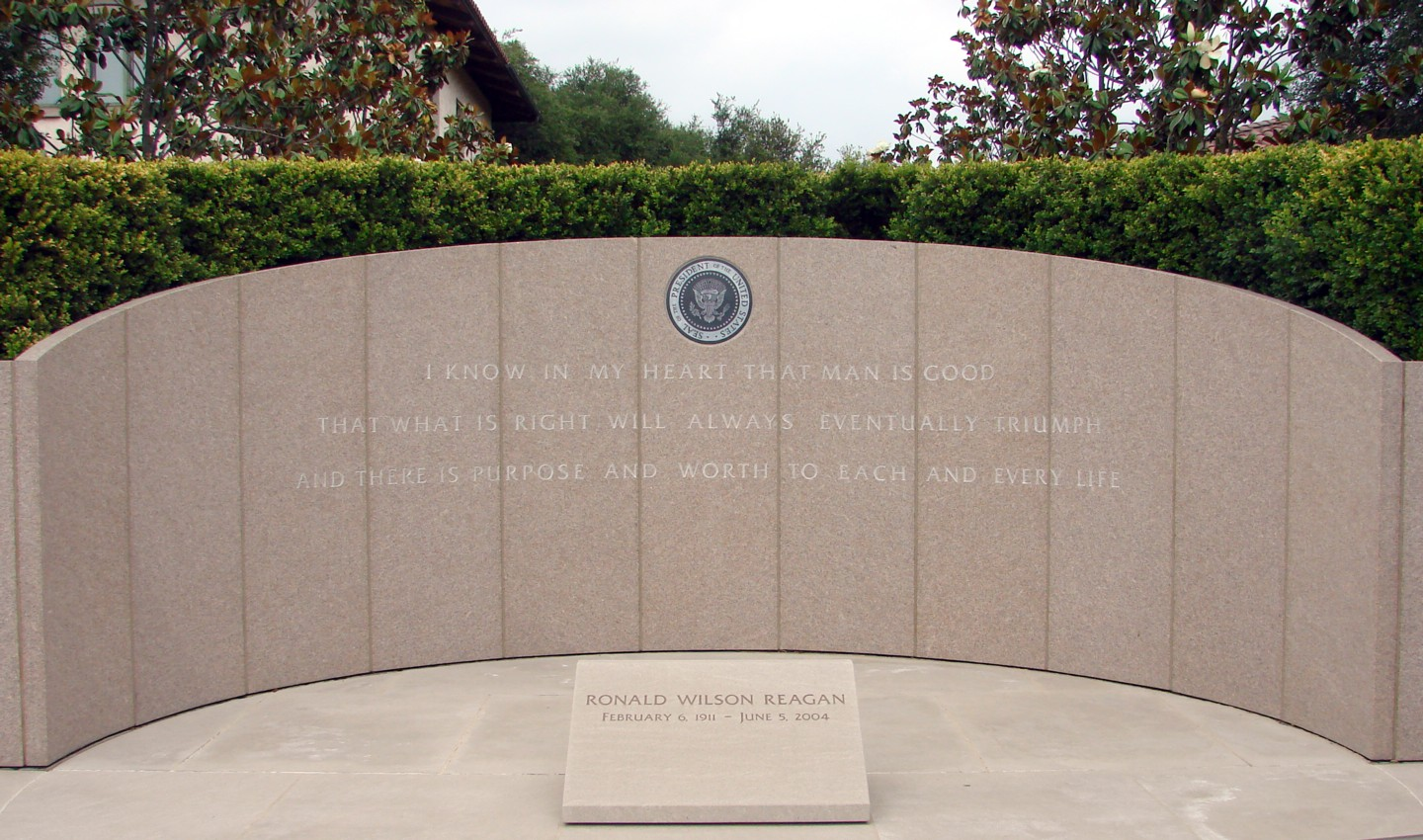
Reagan's tomb

==== Return to California ====
After the service, the casket was driven to Andrews Air Force Base, passing crowds along its route. The family and close friends boarded the VC 25-A Presidential Aircraft, and as she had done previously, Nancy Reagan waved farewell to the crowds just before boarding the plane.

About five hours after the aircraft departed Andrews, it touched down at Naval Base Ventura County, Point Mugu, California. The public, including sailors from the USS Ronald Reagan, was there to witness the plane's arrival. Reagan's body was driven in a large motorcade through the streets of southern California.

==== Burial service ====
The service drew 700 invited guests, including former Reagan administration officials such as George P. Shultz, and noted dignitaries; Margaret Thatcher, who traveled on the plane from Washington, sat next to California Governor Arnold Schwarzenegger and his wife, Maria Shriver; former California governor Pete Wilson was in attendance, as well as former Los Angeles Mayor Richard Riordan. Hollywood actors and other celebrities also attended, including Mr. Reagan's first wife, actress Jane Wyman, their granddaughter Margaret, Kirk Douglas, Charlton Heston, Mickey Rooney, Dolores Hope (widow of Bob Hope), Merv Griffin, Tommy Lasorda, Wayne Gretzky, Scott Baio, Bo Derek, Tom Selleck, Pat Sajak, Wayne Newton, and the Sinatra family. The three surviving Reagan children, Michael, Patti, and Ron, gave final eulogies at the interment ceremony.

Eulogies finished, and the service over, the Air Force Band of the Golden West played four "ruffles and flourishes", and the U.S. Army Chorus sang "The Star-Spangled Banner". Bagpiper Eric Rigler played "Amazing Grace" as the casket was moved to its grave site and placed on a plinth. There, burial rites were given, followed by a last 21-gun salute; members of the armed services fired three volleys and a bugler played "Taps". At that time, four Navy F/A-18 fighter jets flew over in missing man formation, and the flag that flew over the Capitol during President Reagan's 1981 inauguration was folded by the honor guard and was presented to Nancy Reagan by Captain James Symonds, the commanding officer of the USS Ronald Reagan.

After Nancy Reagan accepted the flag, she approached the casket and spent several minutes patting and stroking it. She laid her head down on the casket, before breaking down and crying; The Washington Post described Nancy as having been "stoic through nearly a week of somber rituals" but she "surrendered to her grief after being handed the flag that had covered her husband's coffin." While she cried, she kissed the casket and said "I love you". Her children surrounded her, and attempted to console her. Nancy then walked away with her military escort, clutching the folded flag. The military band began to play the Victorian hymn "My Faith Looks Up to Thee" as the Reagan children said their goodbyes. Funeral attendees had an opportunity to file past the coffin.

The casket was lowered into the vault and closed at 3:00 am PDT the next day. The exterior of the horseshoe-shaped monument is inscribed with a quote Ronald Reagan delivered in 1991:

I know in my heart that man is good, that what is right will always eventually triumph, and there is purpose and worth to each and every life.

When Nancy Reagan died in 2016, she was entombed next to her husband.

== Attending guests ==
=== American politicians ===
Thousands of American politicians attended the funeral, including:

- President George W. Bush and First Lady Laura Bush
- Former president Bill Clinton and former first lady Hillary Clinton
- Former president George H. W. Bush (Reagan's vice president) and former first lady Barbara Bush
- Former president Jimmy Carter (Reagan's 1980 election opponent) and former first lady Rosalynn Carter
- Former president and former vice president Gerald Ford and former first lady Betty Ford
- Former first lady Nancy Reagan (Reagan's widow)
- Vice President Dick Cheney and Second Lady Lynne Cheney
- Former vice president Al Gore and former second lady Tipper Gore
- Former vice president Dan Quayle and former second lady Marilyn Quayle
- Former vice president Walter Mondale (Reagan's 1984 election opponent)
- California Governor Arnold Schwarzenegger
- Former California Governors Jerry Brown and Pete Wilson
- Former Virginia senator and governor Chuck Robb and Lynda Bird Johnson Robb (Representing her mother Former First Lady; Lady Bird Johnson)
- Former Los Angeles mayor Richard Riordan
- Secretary of State Colin Powell
- Former Secretaries of State Henry Kissinger, George Shultz and Warren Christopher
- Past and present US Congress members
- Past and present US Senate members

=== Foreign dignitaries ===
Such a large number of foreign dignitaries had not attended a United States president's state funeral since the 1963 funeral of President John F. Kennedy. There were nearly 250 international delegates coming from 167 countries presented at the service, which included more than 45 current or former world leaders and 30 governmental representatives.

Delegations in attendance included:

- United Nations: Secretary-general Kofi Annan, President of the General Assembly Jean Ping
- UNESCO: Director-general Koichiro Matsuura
- European Union: President of the Commission Romano Prodi
- NATO: Deputy Secretary General Alessandro Minuto-Rizzo
- OAS: Secretary General César Gaviria
- United Kingdom: Charles, Prince of Wales, Prime Minister Tony Blair, wife Cherie Blair and former prime minister Margaret Thatcher
- CIS: Secretary General Vladimir Rushailo
- Canada: Governor General Adrienne Clarkson, former prime minister Brian Mulroney, wife Mila Mulroney
- Mexico: President Vicente Fox, wife Marta Sahagún, Foreign Minister Luis Ernesto Derbez
- Peru: Former president Alberto Fujimori
- Chile: Deputy President Michelle Bachelet
- Australia: Governor General Michael Jeffery
- New Zealand: Governor-General Dame Silvia Cartwright
- Marshall Islands: President Kessai Note
- Vanuatu: Prime Minister Ham Lini
- Japan: Former prime minister Yasuhiro Nakasone
- South Korea: Foreign Minister Lee Hai-chan
- China: Foreign Minister Li Zhaoxing
- Israel: Prime Minister Shimon Peres
- Germany: Chancellor Gerhard Schroeder, former chancellor Helmut Kohl
- Austria: Chancellor Wolfgang Schüssel
- Switzerland: Former president Adolf Ogi
- Romania: President Ion Iliescu
- Italy: Prime Minister Silvio Berlusconi
- France: Prime Minister Jean-Pierre Raffarin, Foreign Minister Michel Barnier, former president Valery Giscard d'Estaing
- Denmark: Crown Prince Frederik, former prime minister Poul Schlüter
- Norway: Prime Minister Jens Stoltenberg
- Sweden: Deputy Prime Minister Lars Engqvist
- Hungary: Former prime minister Viktor Orbán
- Soviet Union: Former general-secretary and president Mikhail Gorbachev
- Poland: Former president Lech Wałęsa
- Slovakia: President Rudolf Schuster, President-elect Ivan Gašparovič
- Slovenia: President Janez Drnovšek
- Finland: Prime Minister Matti Vanhanen, former president Mauno Koivisto
- Turkey: Prime Minister Recep Tayyip Erdoğan
- Greece: Former king Constantine II
- Spain: Felipe, Prince of Asturias
- Estonia: Prime Minister Andrus Ansip, former president Lennart Meri
- Bulgaria: Former president Zhelyu Zhelev
- Portugal: President of the Parliament João Bosco Mota Amaral
- Lithuania: Acting president Artūras Paulauskas
- Russia: President Vladimir Putin
- Netherlands: Former Minister of Foreign Affairs and European Commissioner Hans van den Broek
- Afghanistan: President Hamid Karzai
- Iraq: President Ghazi Mashal Ajil al-Yawer
- Iran: Former Shahbanu Farah Pahlavi
- Egypt: Foreign Minister Ahmed Maher
- Ghana: President John Kufuor
- Monaco: Hereditary Prince Albert
- Belgium: Crown Prince Philippe
- Luxembourg: Sovereign Grand Duke Henri
- Liechtenstein: Deputy Prime Minister Adrian Hasler
- Jordan: King Abdullah II, Queen Rania
- India: Foreign Minister K. Natwar Singh
- Pakistan: President of the Senate Mohammadmian Soomro
- Uganda: President Yoweri Museveni
- Ireland: President Mary McAleese
- Iceland: Prime Minister Davíð Oddsson
- Czech Republic: President Václav Klaus, former president Václav Havel
- Cyprus: President Tassos Papadopoulos
- Bahrain: King Hamad bin Isa Al Khalifa
- Saudi Arabia: Prince Bandar bin Sultan bin Abdel-Aziz al Saud
- South Africa: President Thabo Mbeki
- Nigeria: President Olusegun Obasanjo
- Algeria: President Abdelaziz Bouteflika
- Ivory Coast: President Laurent Gbagbo
- Latvia: President Vaira Vīķe-Freiberga
- Rwanda: President Paul Kagame
- Senegal: President Abdoulaye Wade
- Bolivia: President Evo Morales
- Taiwan: President of the Control Yuan Fredrick Chien, representative to the U.S. Chen Chien-jen
- Grenada: Prime Minister Keith Mitchell, former governor general Paul Scoon
- Yemen: President Ali Abdullah Saleh
- Haiti: Prime Minister Gerard Latortue
- Brazil: Former president José Sarney
- Philippines: Foreign Minister Delia Albert
- Palestine: President Mahmoud Abbas
- Vatican City: Secretary of State Angelo Sodano

Eminent persons and envoys from Hong Kong, Moldova, Kazakhstan, Kyrgyzstan, Azerbaijan, and others were also present, along with more than 200 diplomats and ambassadors.

=== Celebrities ===
Many celebrities attended the event, such as the Sinatra family, TV personality Merv Griffin, and Wheel of Fortune host Pat Sajak.

== Music ==
Music played during the week-long events included four ruffles and flourishes, "Hail to the Chief", "My Country, 'Tis of Thee", "The Battle Hymn of the Republic", "Amazing Grace", "Eternal Father, Strong to Save" (also known as "The Navy Hymn"), "God of Our Fathers", "Mansions of the Lord", "God Bless America", "America the Beautiful", "Going Home", and "On a Hymnsong of Philip Bliss" by David Holsinger. The US Marine Orchestra was conducted by Colonel Timothy Foley and the Armed Forces Chorus was conducted by Lieutenant Colonel John Clanton.

== Security measures ==
The state funeral marked the first time that Washington had hosted a major event since September 11, 2001. As a result, the Department of Homeland Security (DHS) designated the state funeral a National Special Security Event (NSSE). Special precautions were taken, since many of the events were open to the public and there were multiple protectees.

Attorney General John Ashcroft told a Senate hearing before the funeral: "It is a sad commentary when the observation of a memorial service for a former president of the United States must be labeled a National Special Security Event. Such is the fact of modern life in Washington and such is the nature of the war against al Qaeda." MPDC Chief Charles H. Ramsey agreed, saying, "In a post-9/11 world, we have to be very concerned and aware of the potential for something to happen, not that we've received any information at all." Ashcroft and other officials at DHS, the MPDC, and FBI said that the funeral was taking place amidst threats of a terrorist attack.

Frank Sesno, former CNN White House correspondent during the Reagan White House years, said that the security measures during the funeral reflected on the fact that the age of terrorism was rooted during the Reagan years. The deadliest act of terrorism against the United States before 9/11 happened during the Reagan years with the bombing of Pan Am Flight 103 over Lockerbie, Scotland, which killed 189 Americans.

DHS was handling another NSSE at the same time: the G8 Summit in Sea Island, Georgia.

== Public and media comments ==
The majority of those commemorating Reagan were supporters of his, although not all held the 40th president in high regard. In one noted example, Paul Mays, a retired engineer who never thought much of Reagan's politics, witnessed the motorcade leave the tarmac at Andrews Air Force Base; he commented "This is history". Frank Dubois, an American University professor, also was there for the motorcade, though of the laudatory praise he remarked, "[Reagan] hurt the environment; there was double-digit inflation. I just don't get it."

The majority of media coverage of the event was deferential. Most major news organizations broadcast the various events live multiple times; during the week, the cable channel C-SPAN broadcast uninterrupted coverage of the funeral ceremonies. A few complained, however, that the television coverage was excessive and preempted coverage of other events. CBS News anchor Dan Rather was quoted as saying: "Even though everybody is respectful and wants to pay homage to the president, life does go on. There is other news, like the reality of Iraq. It got very short shrift this weekend." Throughout the week, media experts reported that the national mourning, televised nearly non-stop on many television networks, provided Americans welcome respite from unhappy reports that American troops were being killed in Iraq and Afghanistan, giving them a sense of good news they had been desperate for since the September 11 attacks.

Reagan's obituaries also included a few criticisms. Richard Goldstein of The Village Voice criticized the funeral for its careful orchestration, writing: "Because the networks had so long to plan for this production... this was the most precisely mounted news event in modern times. Each gesture was minutely choreographed, every tear strategically placed."

Additionally, some media outlets were criticized for lionizing Reagan without paying equal attention to more controversial decisions made during his administration. Thomas Kunkel, dean of the University of Maryland, College Park's journalism college, wrote in A magazine that the coverage "would have you believe that Reagan was a cross between Abe Lincoln and Mother Teresa, with an overlay of Mister Rogers." Howard Kurtz, The Washington Post's media columnist, said Reagan was "a far more controversial figure in his time than the largely gushing obits on television would suggest."

== Gallery ==
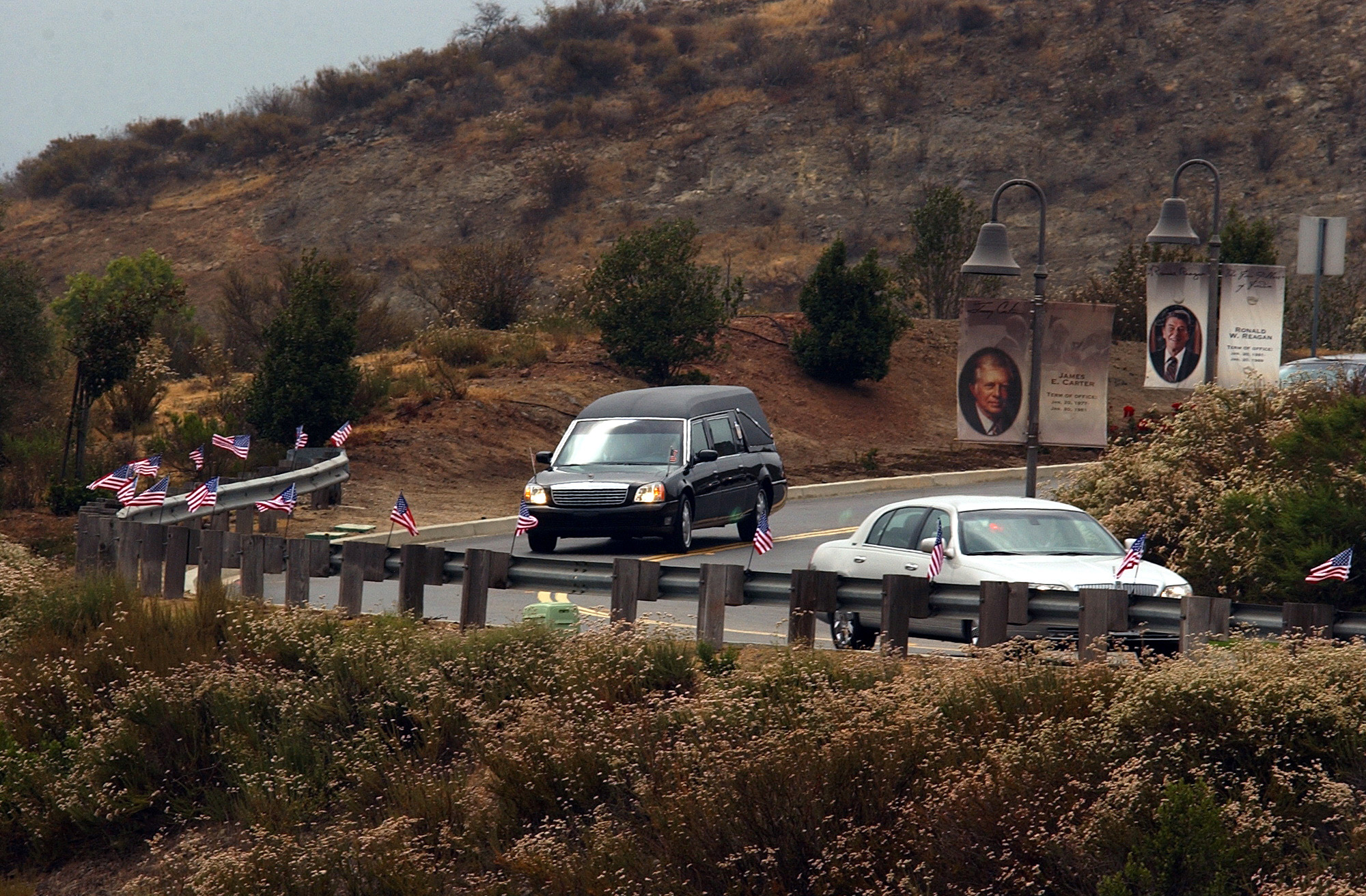
Former president Ronald Reagan's hearse arrives at the Ronald Reagan Presidential Library on June 7, 2004.

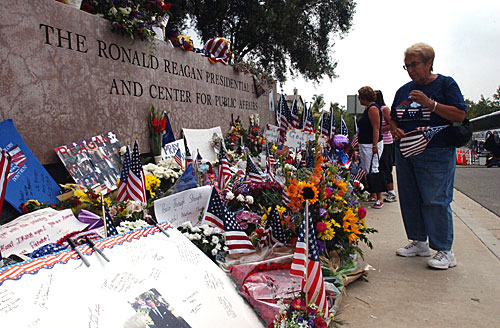
Mourners lay flowers and tributes in front of the Reagan Library's sign.

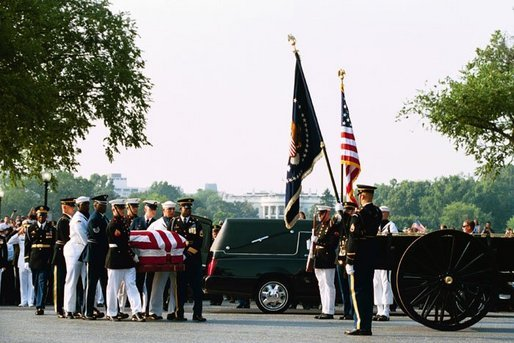
The casket of former president Ronald Reagan is transferred from a hearse to a caisson at 16th Street and Constitution Avenue in Washington, D.C. on June 9, 2004.

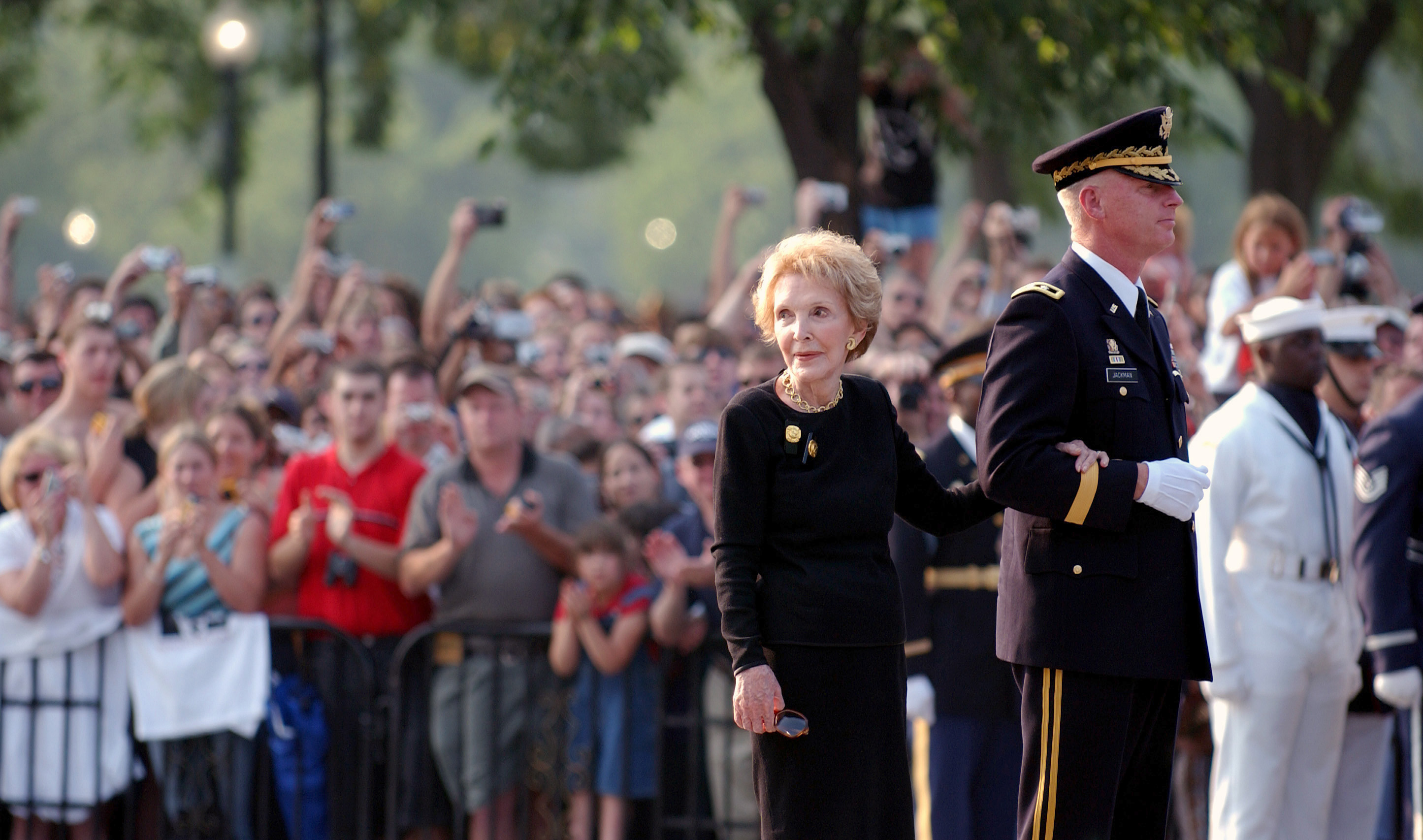
Former first lady Nancy Reagan on hand at 16th Street and Constitution Avenue to witness the transfer of her husband, Ronald Reagan's casket from hearse to caisson

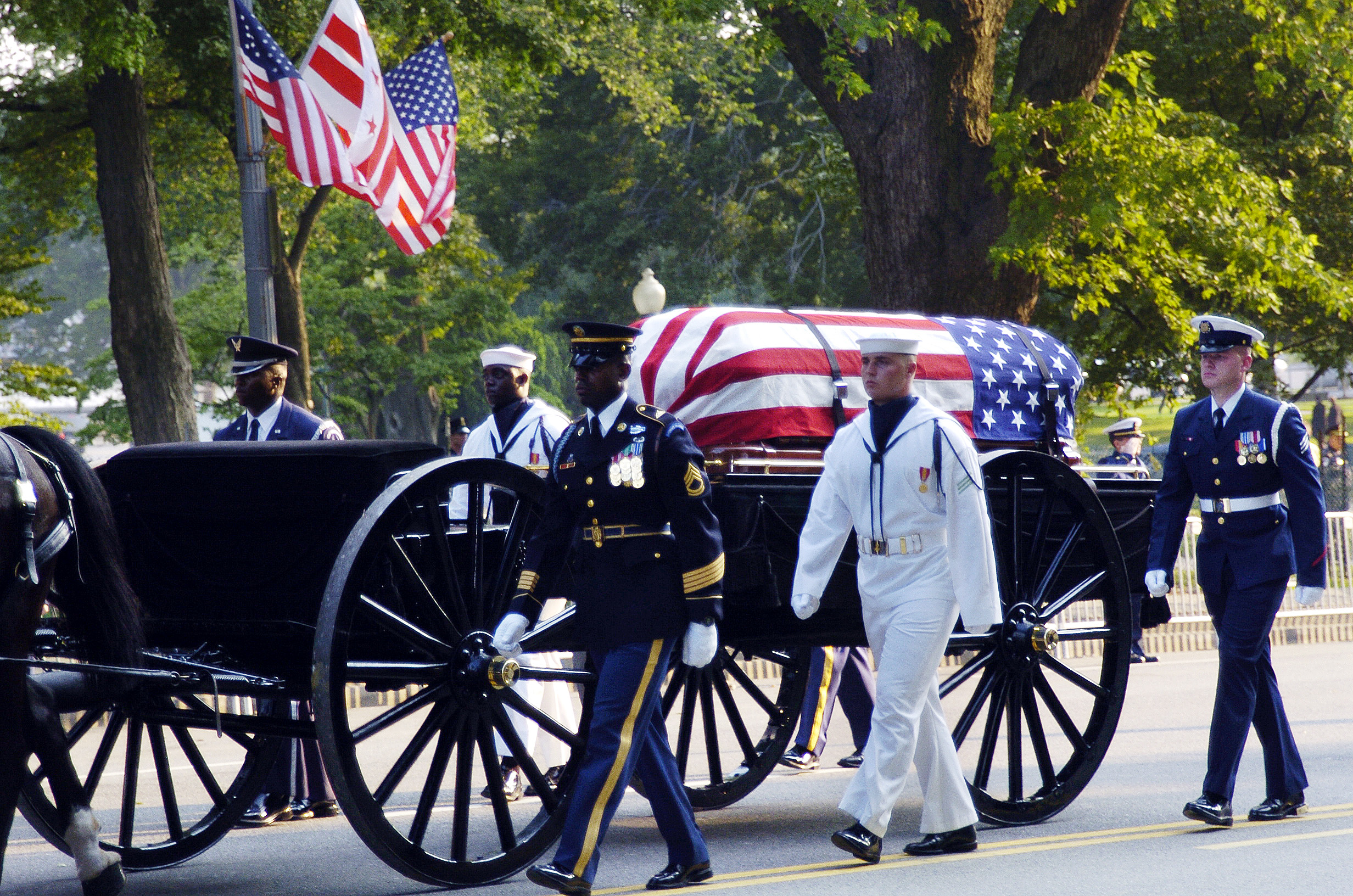
A caisson bearing the casket of former president Ronald Reagan proceeding down Constitution Avenue en route to the United States Capitol building

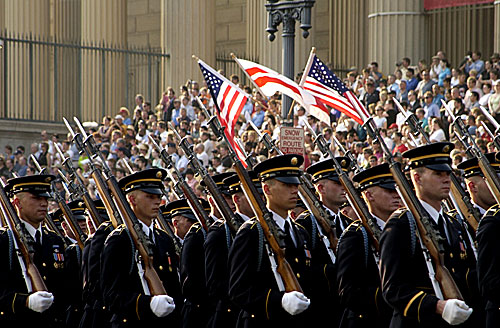
United States Army soldiers escort former President Ronald Reagan's casket to the United States Capitol Building.

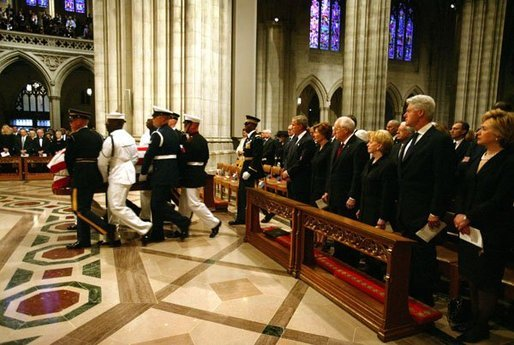
Then President George W. Bush, his wife, Laura Bush, then Vice President Dick Cheney, his wife, Lynne Cheney, former president Bill Clinton and his wife, then Senator Hillary Clinton, watch the casket of former president Ronald Reagan carried into Washington National Cathedral.

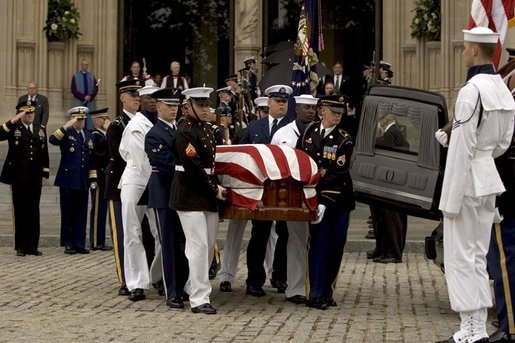
Honor guards carry the casket of former President Ronald Reagan to a waiting hearse outside of Washington National Cathedral.

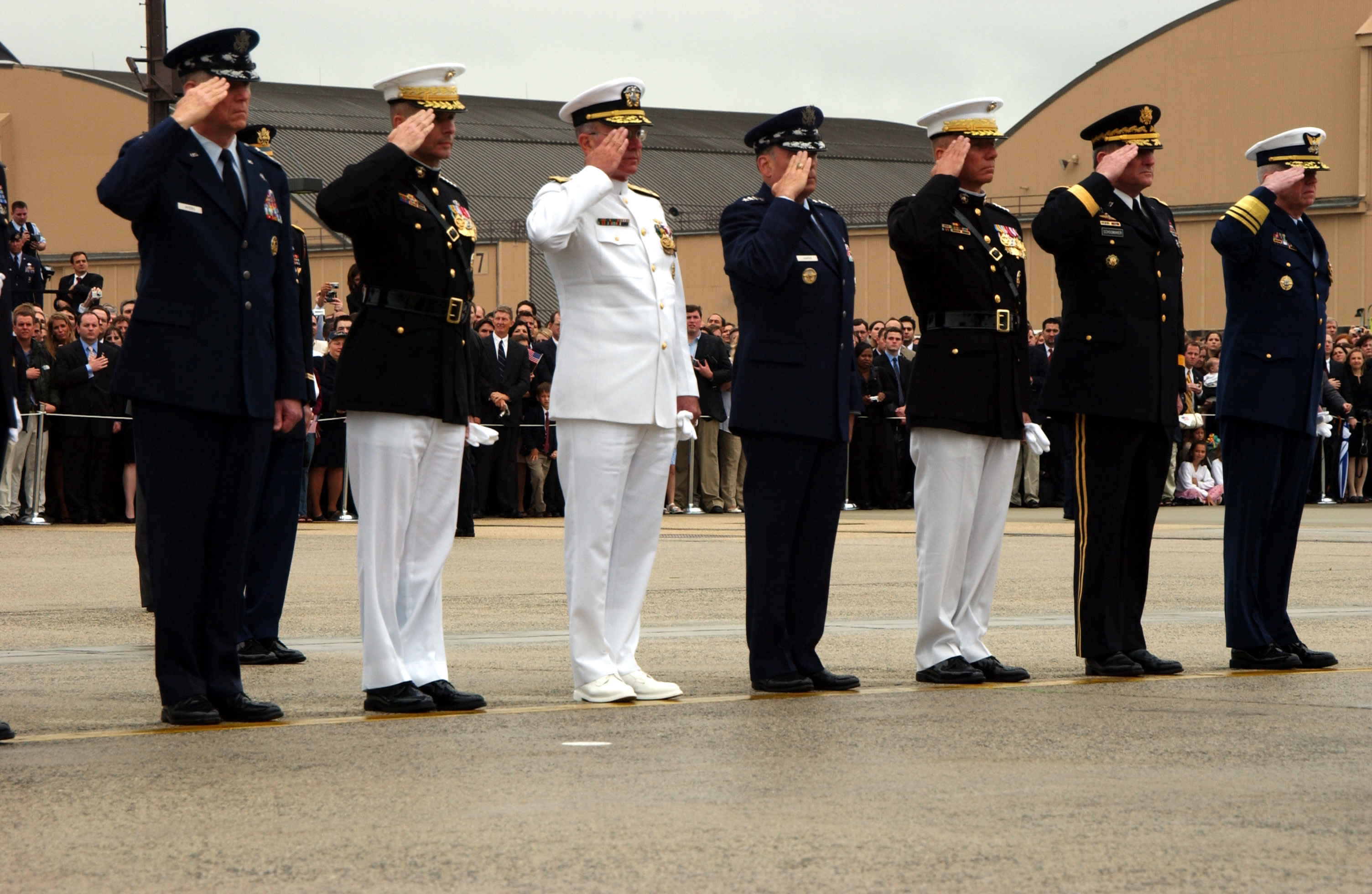
Members of The Joint Chiefs of Staff render a salute during the departure ceremony at Andrews Air Force Base.

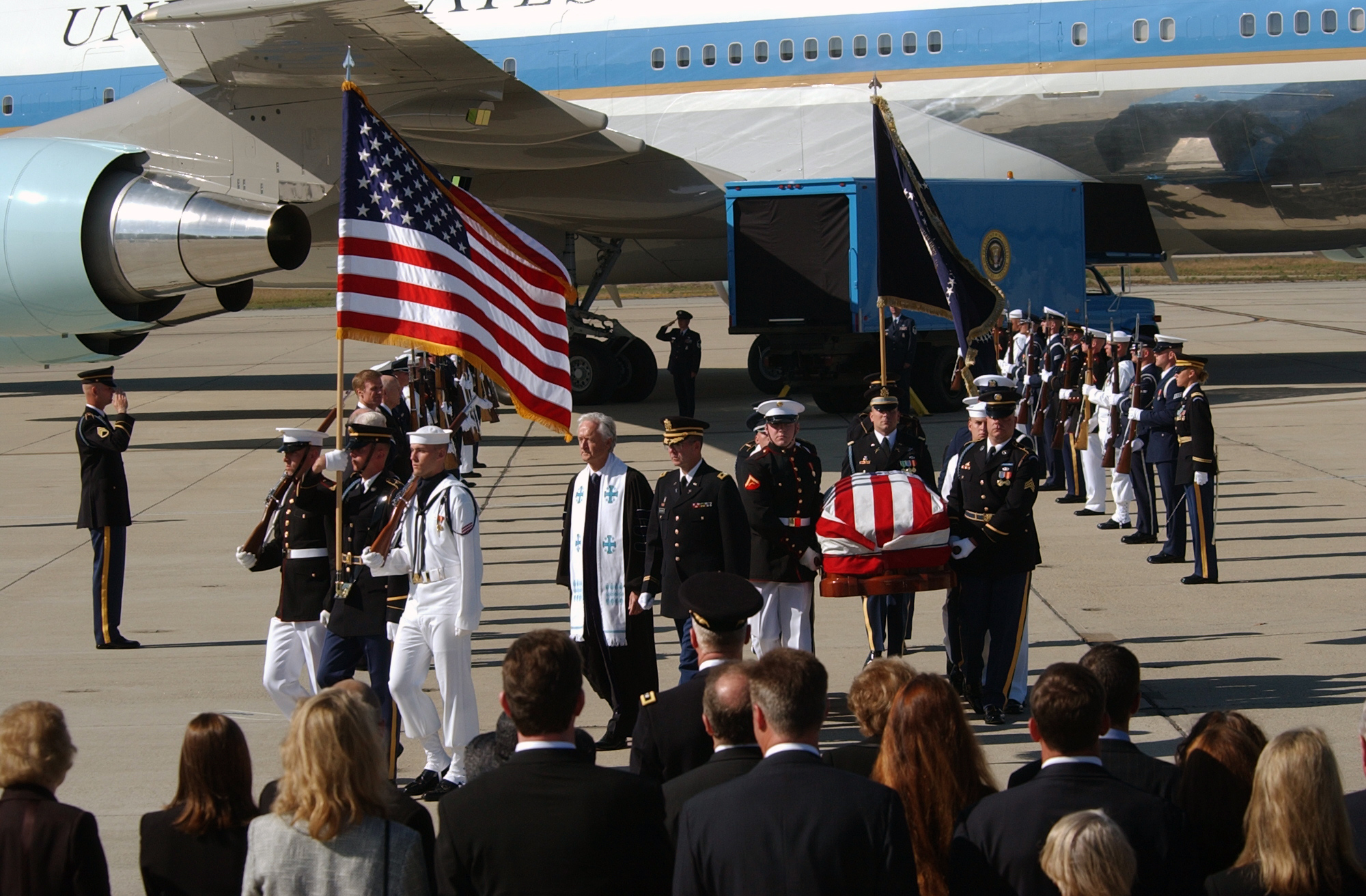
Honor and color guards carry the casket of former president Ronald Reagan after it is removed from the Boeing VC-25 Special Air Mission (SAM) 28000 in California.

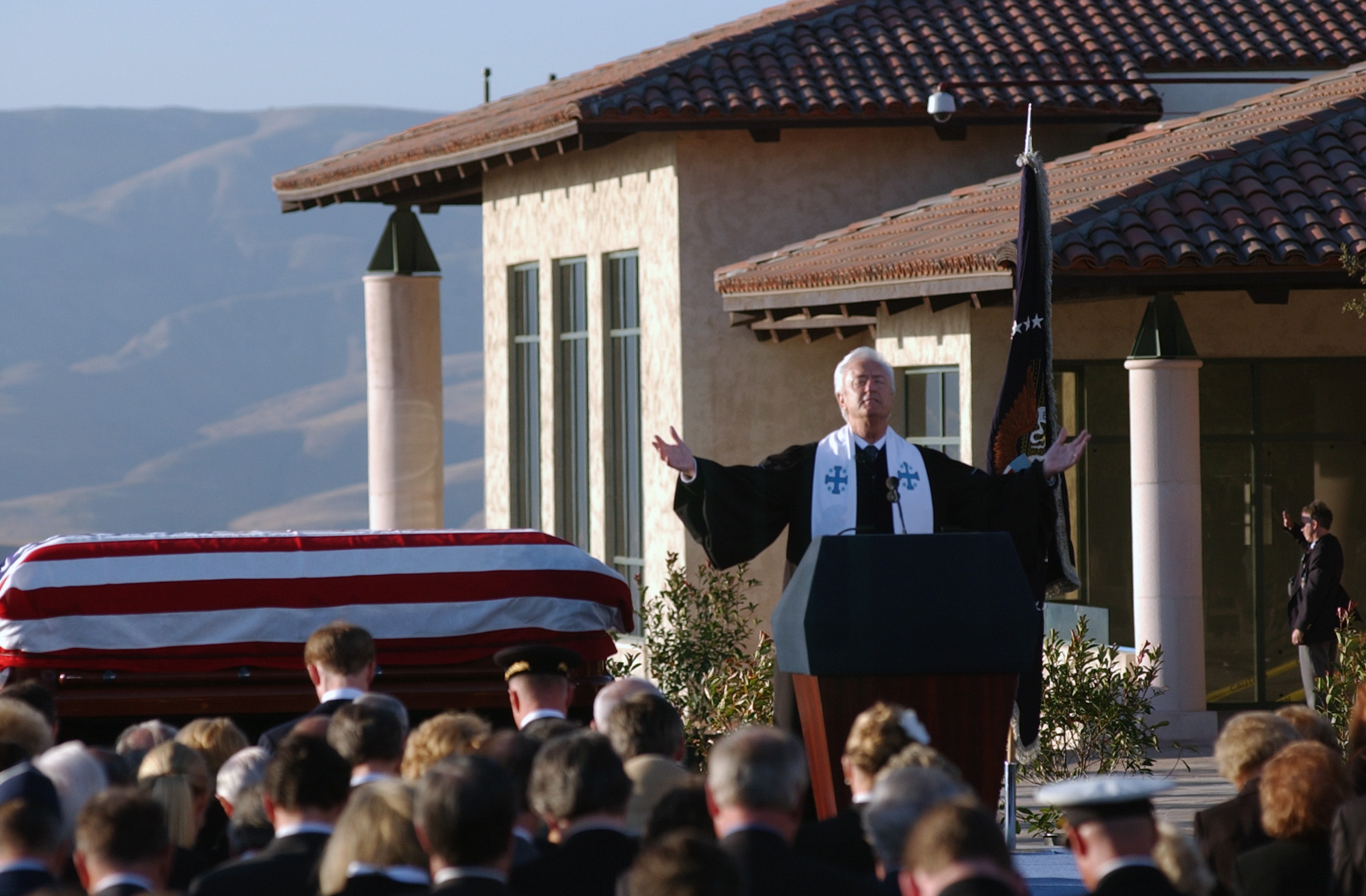
The Reverend Dr. Michael H. Wenning delivering a eulogy during a sunset interment service at the Ronald Reagan Presidential Library in Simi Valley, California, on June 11, 2004

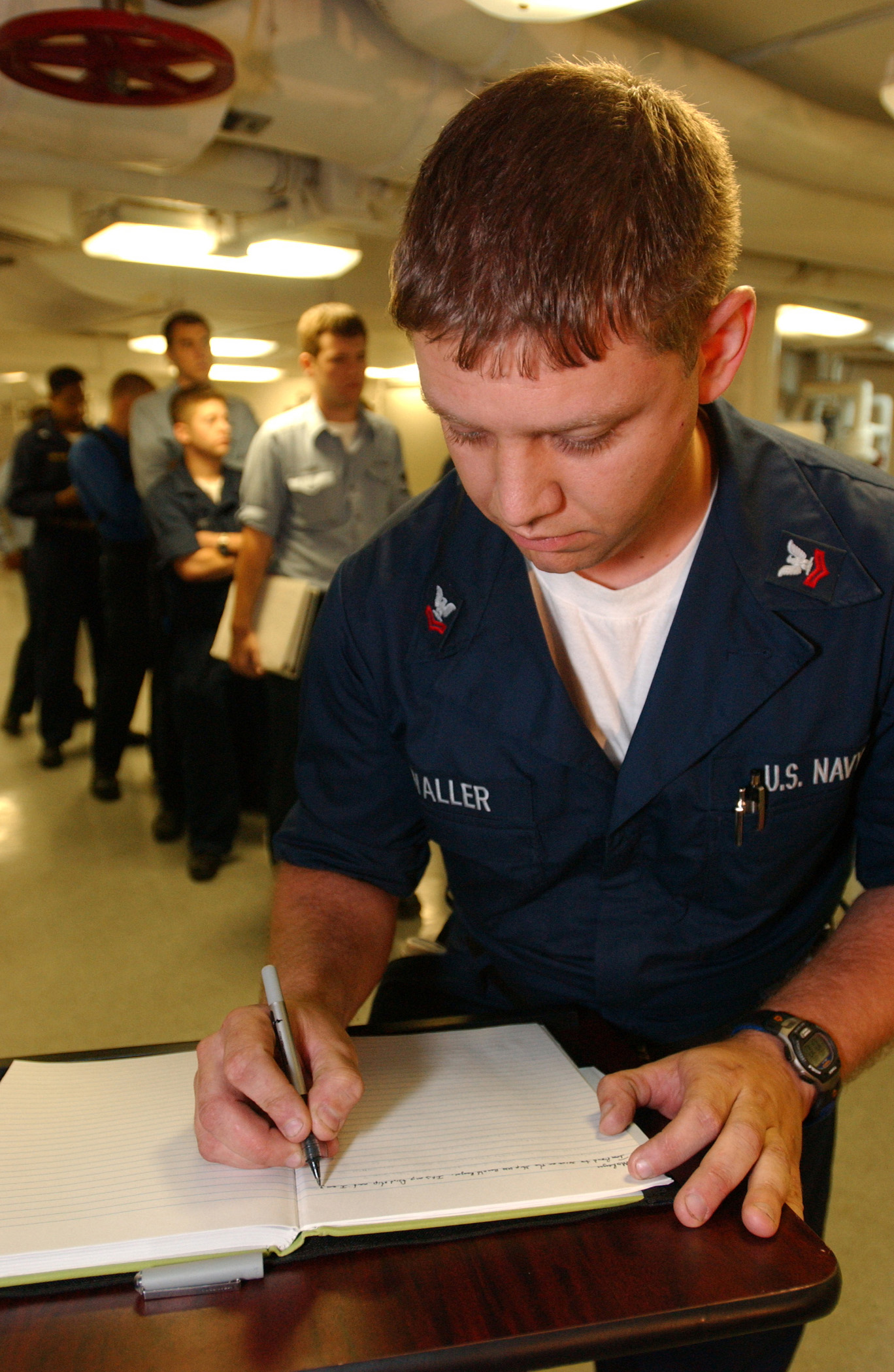
Aboard USS Ronald Reagan, June 7, 2004: Navy sailor writes a personal message in book to be presented to Nancy Reagan during President Ronald Reagan's interment ceremony.

== See also ==
- State funerals in the United States
