= Sergeant York (horse) =

Horse owned by the US Army

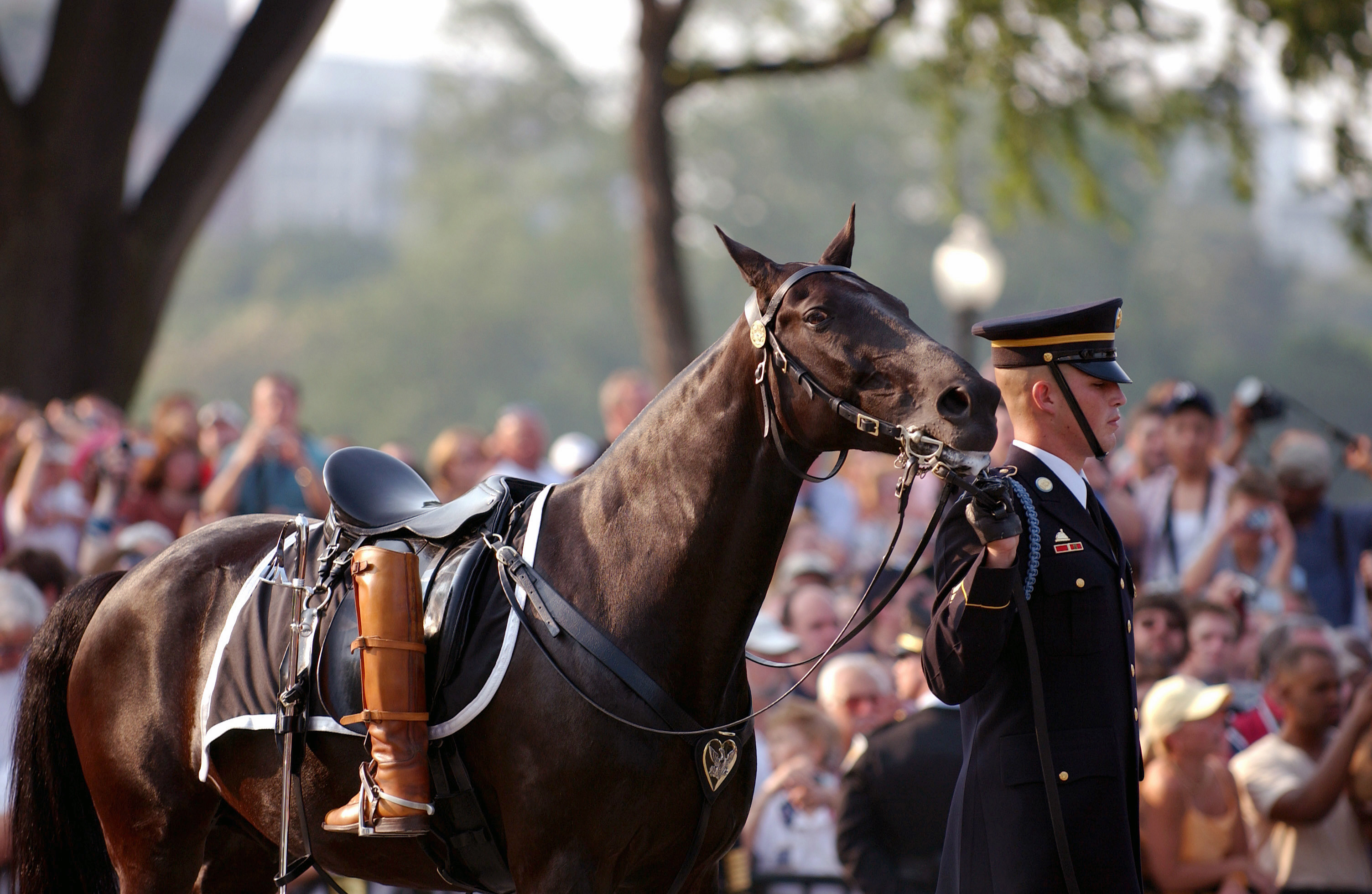
Sergeant York pictured during the state funeral of Ronald Reagan in 2004.

Sergeant York (formerly Allaboard Jules) was a retired horse that was previously owned by the United States Army.

An American Standardbred, Sergeant York was foaled April 25, 1991, and reared as a racehorse in New York under the name Allaboard Jules. During his racing career, he won five of the 23 races in which he participated at tracks in New Jersey and New York. In 1997, Allaboard Jules entered military service and was renamed Sergeant York, in honor of Alvin York. He was posted to the Military District of Washington as part of the United States Army Caisson Platoon of the 3rd Infantry Regiment where he served as a caparisoned horse. Sergeant York filled this role, among other occasions, at the state funeral of Ronald Reagan.

Sergeant York retired in June 2022 at the age of 31 after 25 years of service in the United States Army. He was retired at Equine Advocates Rescue & Sanctuary in Chatham, New York. Sergeant York was awarded an Animals in War & Peace Distinguished Service Medal from members of Congress at a ceremony on March 8, 2023.

Sergeant York died on January 1, 2026. He was 34 years old.
