= 30th G8 summit =

2004 international leader meeting in the US

30th G8 Summit

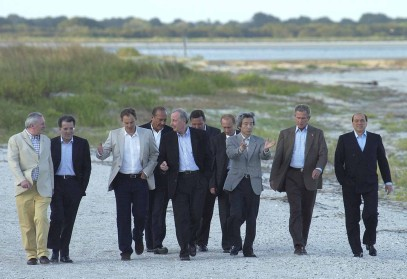
- Host country: United States
- Dates: June 8–10, 2004
- Cities: Sea Island
- Venues: Sea Island Resort
- Follows: 29th G8 summit
- Precedes: 31st G8 summit

The 30th G8 summit was held in Sea Island, Georgia, United States, on June 8–10, 2004.

== Overview ==
The Group of Seven (G7) was an unofficial forum that brought together the heads of the richest industrialized countries: France, Germany, Italy, Japan, the United Kingdom, the United States, and Canada starting in 1976. The G8, meeting for the first time in 1997, was formed with the addition of Russia. In addition, the president of the European Commission has been formally included in summits since 1981. The summits were not meant to be linked formally with wider international institutions; and in fact, a mild rebellion against the stiff formality of other international meetings was a part of the genesis of cooperation between France's president Valéry Giscard d'Estaing and West Germany's chancellor Helmut Schmidt as they conceived the initial summit of the Group of Six (G6) in 1975.

The G8 summits during the 21st-century have inspired widespread debates, protests and demonstrations; and the two- or three-day event becomes more than the sum of its parts, elevating the participants, the issues and the venue as focal points for anarchists, anticapitalists and domestic terrorists.

== Leaders at the summit ==
The G8 is an unofficial annual forum for the leaders of Canada, the European Commission, France, Germany, Italy, Japan, Russia, the United Kingdom, and the United States.

The 30th G8 summit was the first summit for Canadian Prime Minister Paul Martin.

=== Participants ===
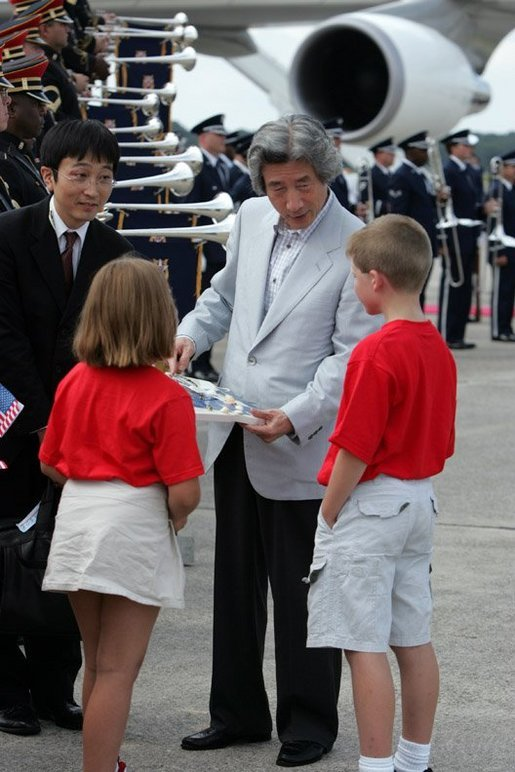
Japanese Prime Minister Junichiro Koizumi arriving at the summit

These summit participants are the current "core members" of the international forum:

**Core G8 members** Host state and leader are shown in bold text.
Member		Represented by	Title
(Canada)	Canada	Paul Martin	Prime Minister
(France)	France	Jacques Chirac	President
(Germany)	Germany	Gerhard Schröder	Chancellor
(Italy)	Italy	Silvio Berlusconi	Prime Minister
(Japan)	Japan	Junichiro Koizumi	Prime Minister
(Russia)	Russia	Vladimir Putin	President
(United Kingdom)	United Kingdom	Tony Blair	Prime Minister
(United States)	**United States**	**George W. Bush**	**President**
(European Union)	European Union	Romano Prodi	Commission President
(European Union)	European Union	Bertie Ahern	Council President
**Guest invitees (Countries)**
Member		Represented by	Title
(Afghanistan)	Afghanistan	Hamid Karzai	President
(Algeria)	Algeria	Abdelaziz Bouteflika	President
(Bahrain)	Bahrain	Hamad bin Isa Al Khalifa	King
(Ghana)	Ghana	John Kufuor	President
(Iraq)	Iraq	Ghazi Mashal Ajil al-Yawer	President
(Jordan)	Jordan	Abdullah II	King
(Nigeria)	Nigeria	Olusegun Obasanjo	President
(Senegal)	Senegal	Abdoulaye Wade	President
(South Africa)	South Africa	Thabo Mbeki	President
(Turkey)	Turkey	Recep Tayyip Erdoğan	Prime Minister
(Uganda)	Uganda	Yoweri Museveni	President
(Yemen)	Yemen	Ali Abdullah Saleh	President
**Guest invitees (International institutions)**
Member		Represented by	Title
(United Nations)	United Nations	Kofi Annan	Secretary-General

== Priorities ==
Traditionally, the host country of the G8 summit sets the agenda for negotiations, which take place primarily amongst multi-national civil servants in the weeks before the summit itself, leading to a joint declaration which all countries can agree to sign.

== Issues ==
The summit was intended as a venue for resolving differences among its members. As a practical matter, the summit was also conceived as an opportunity for its members to give each other mutual encouragement in the face of difficult economic decisions.

== Citizens' responses and authorities' counter-responses ==
=== Protests ===
The protests against the 2004 meeting of the G8 summit in Sea Island, Georgia, took place over the course of several days in the cities of Brunswick and Savannah, Georgia. Local police coordinated with the Georgia Army and Air National Guard, Georgia State Troopers, and agents from the Federal Bureau of Investigation, the Georgia Bureau of Investigation, and the Secret Service, as well as officers from the Georgia Department of Natural Resources and others who arrived to control crowds and prevent terrorist attacks. Military vehicles (HUMVEEs) and Georgia State Patrol vehicles roamed the city streets and in Savannah and Brunswick near the bridge to the Island daily. The National Guard soldiers also patrolled on foot, searching for weapons and explosives and watching for known "domestic terrorist" groups and the so-called black bloc protesters.

The protests began in Savannah on June 8 with an anti-G8 march. However, about one third of those who marched were undercover agents from the FBI. Much of the planned "black bloc" protests in Savannah were thwarted when the leader of one "domestic terrorist" group was arrested in Savannah for possession of marijuana. Also, National Guard soldiers found several stockpiles of materials that the protest groups intended to use in a "sleeping dragon" maneuvers as well as bats with nails driven through them and piles of rocks and bricks. Then several protesters wearing all black clothing were confronted by National Guard soldiers in riot gear and then arrested by police after they congregated in front of the Starbucks and The Gap stores and began shouting antiglobalization slogans. At least three explosives were found by National Guard soldiers, though none of them turned out to be very big. One "dummy bomb" was found in a trashcan near a hotel where some members of the media were staying. It consisted of a shoe box with an alarm clock, newspapers and dead leaves. On the last day of the Summit, three protesters showed up on River Street, dressed as the Statue of Liberty, but they walked through the street quickly shouting anti-Bush slogans and then left.

In Brunswick, the protests began with an antiwar march on June 8, and a vigil was held on the night of June 9, which attracted about 300 people and the Fair World Fair. The following day, a group of around 100 protesters began congregating near the gates of a chemical plant, until they were directed by security to leave by. The last and most eventful action, the March for a Free Palestine, took place in Brunswick. Several activists made a replica of part of the wall being built between Israel and Palestine, and burnt it to the ground. A breakaway group decided to cross the bridge and head to Sea Island where the G8 meetings were wrapping up. However, the bridge is about 1.5 miles long, and the temperature was in the low 90s with the humidity being above 70 percent. Thus, after crossing the bridge, many of the protesters were overheated, and all were in need of water. They were given bottles of cold water by the National Guard troops who were waiting for them at the end of the bridge. Then the protesters voluntarily loaded onto air-conditioned buses and were taken back to the Brunswick side of the bridge. A few protesters wanted to continue their march, but they were blocked from entering Sea Island by a security fence and the same National Guard troops who were handing out water. So they sat down in front of the gate for about 20 minutes until the police ordered them to leave. A few were arrested, but most voluntarily loaded onto the buses and went back to Brunswick.

The protests were considerably smaller than past G8 Summits, owing in large part to the overwhelming military and police presence. The extent of the military and police presence was somewhat controversial as it led some to believe that martial law had been declared. However, then-Georgia governor Sonny Perdue was unapologetic about his decision to mobilize the security forces.

=== Security ===
The Department of Homeland Security (DHS) designated the summit a National Special Security Event (NSSE), because of the protests and so many heads of state of government attending. However, DHS started to handle another NSSE at the same time: the state funeral of former president Ronald Reagan.

== State funeral of Ronald Reagan ==
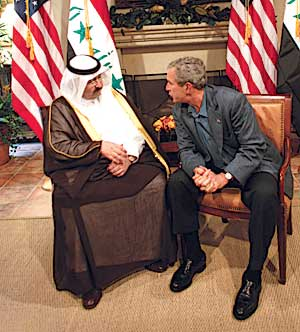
President George W. Bush at the summit with Ghazi Mashal Ajil al-Yawer, acting President of Iraq under the Interim Government

The G8 summit began three days after former US president Ronald Reagan died. President George W. Bush was at the summit at the same time that Reagan's casket was brought to the Capitol to lie in state, which was on the second day of the summit (June 9). Taking his place at the ceremony at the Capitol was Vice-President Dick Cheney.

Some of the world leaders who attended the summit decided to extend their stay in the US to attend the funeral in Washington. One of them was German Chancellor Gerhard Schröder. Joining him in doing so were British Prime Minister Tony Blair and Italian Prime Minister Silvio Berlusconi. Schröder said about extending his stay: "It is appropriate that the German chancellor says, 'Thank you,' and that is what I'm doing."

Those that did not extend their stay, like Canadian Prime Minister Paul Martin, French President Jacques Chirac, and Irish Prime Minister Bertie Ahern, also serving as President-in-Office of the European Council, paid tribute at the summit. The funeral took place the day after the summit ended. Martin cited the ongoing election campaign as the reason for not extending his stay in the US.

Ahern's tribute had special significance, as he paid tribute to Reagan's Irish roots, recalling his visit to Ireland in 1984.

For Afghan Interim President Hamid Karzai, the summit was part of his week-long visit to the US. He scrapped a visit to the West Coast to visit the Afghan community and went to Washington instead, beginning his visit there by attending the funeral.

== Business opportunity ==
For some, the G8 summit became a profit-generating event; as for example, the official G8 Summit magazines which have been published under the auspices of the host nations for distribution to all attendees since 1998.

The summit planning committee contracted with a Georgia-based wireless communication provider for 450 handsets and service to be used during the run up to the international event. In order to ensure reliable coverage in the coastal area around Sea Island, the company increased coverage and system capacity in advance of the summit. The handsets were deployed to coordinate operations, logistics, transportation, and other critical aspects of the preparations for the summit.

== Gallery of participating leaders ==
=== Core G8 participants ===
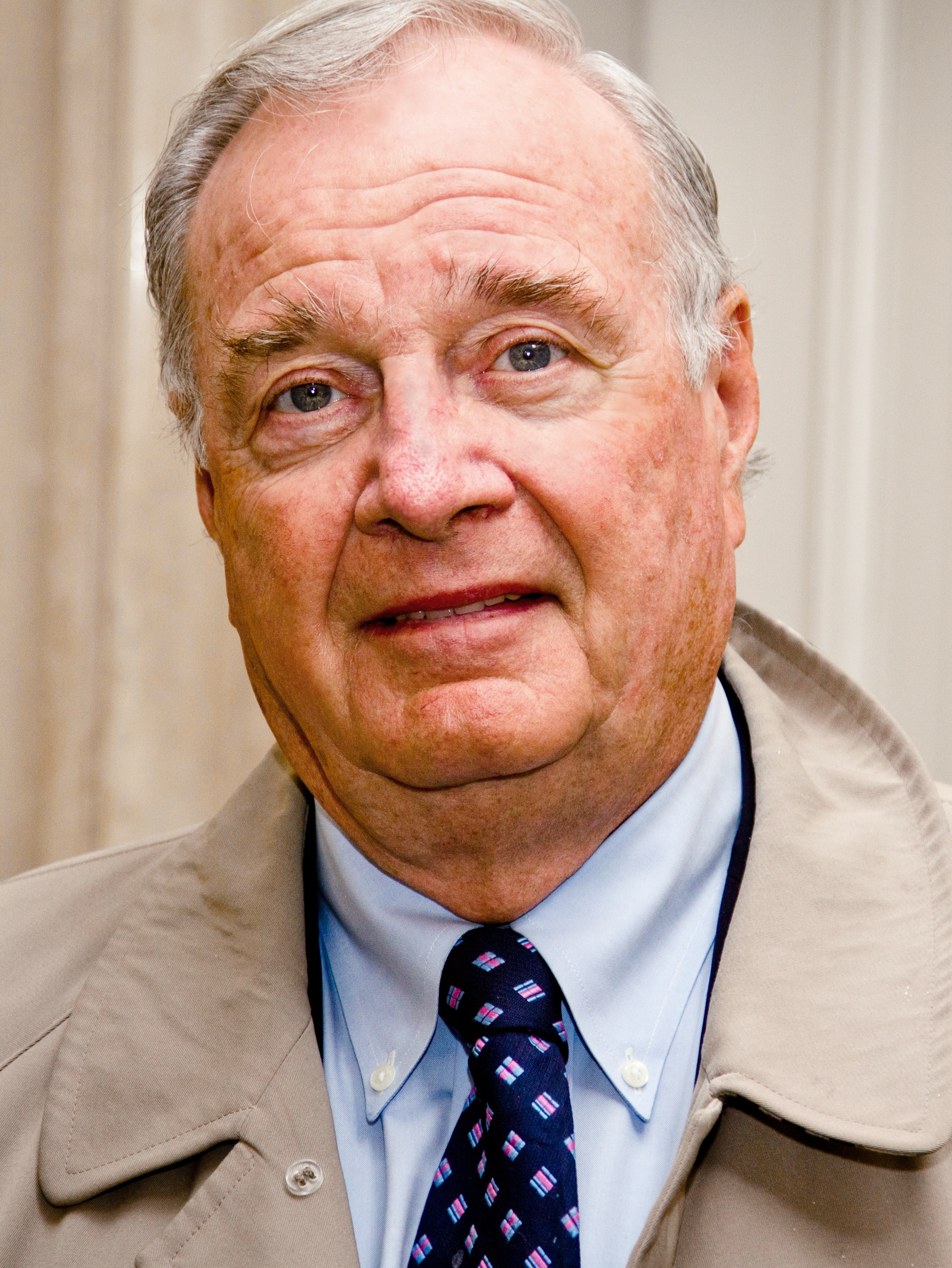
(Canada) Canada
Paul Martin,
Prime Minister

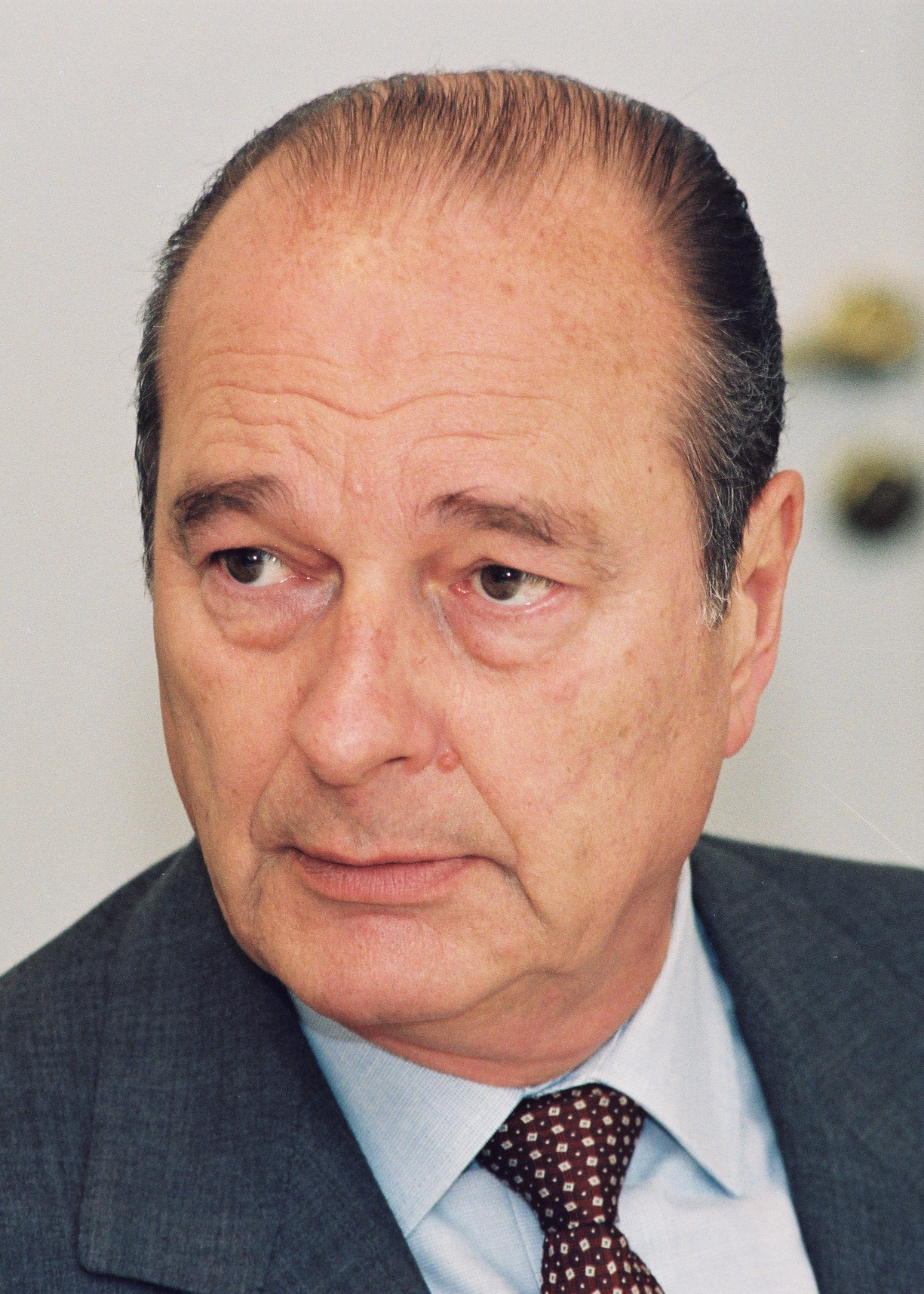
(France) France
Jacques Chirac,
President

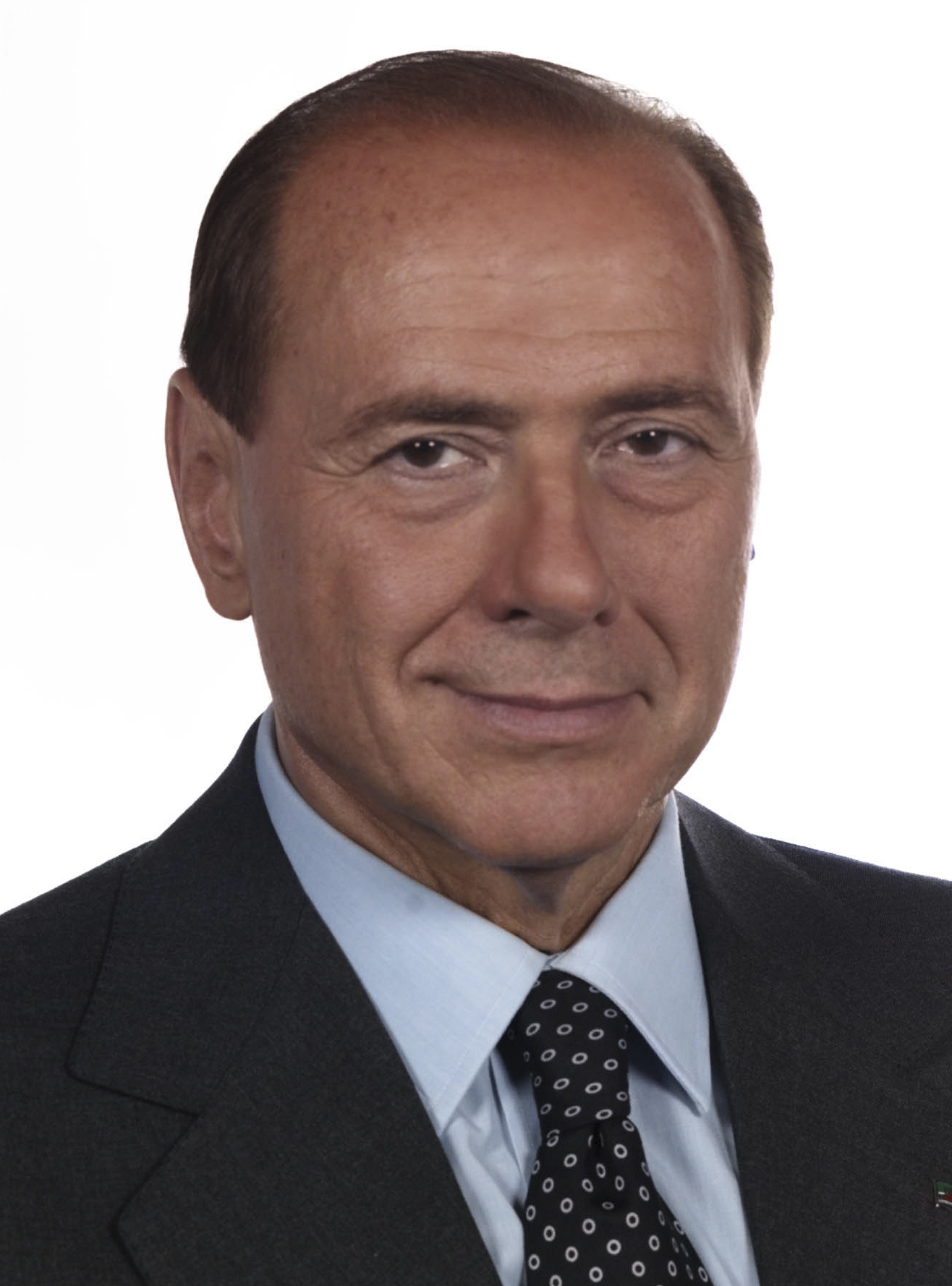
(Italy) Italy
Silvio Berlusconi,
Prime Minister

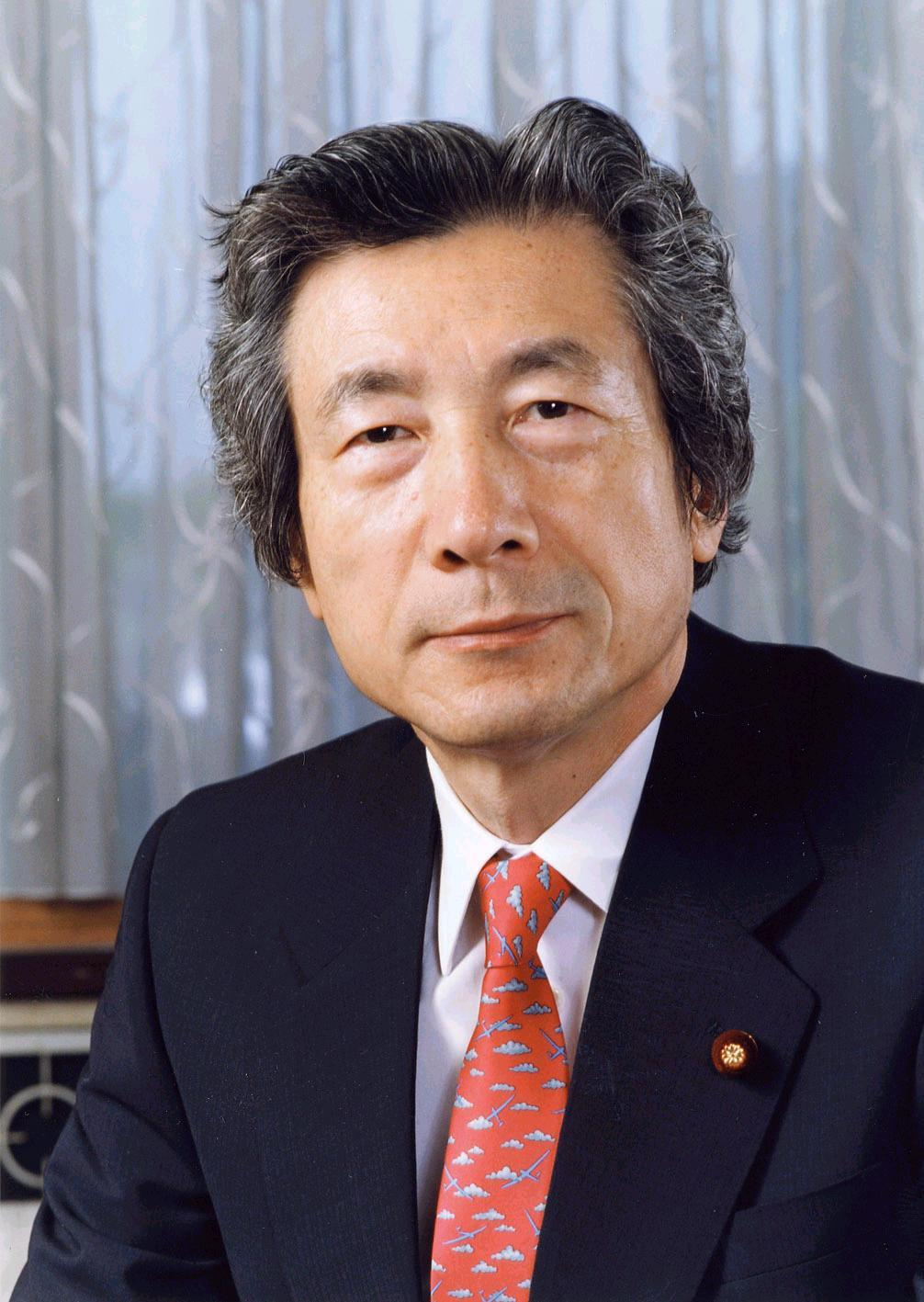
(Japan) Japan
Junichirō Koizumi,
Prime Minister

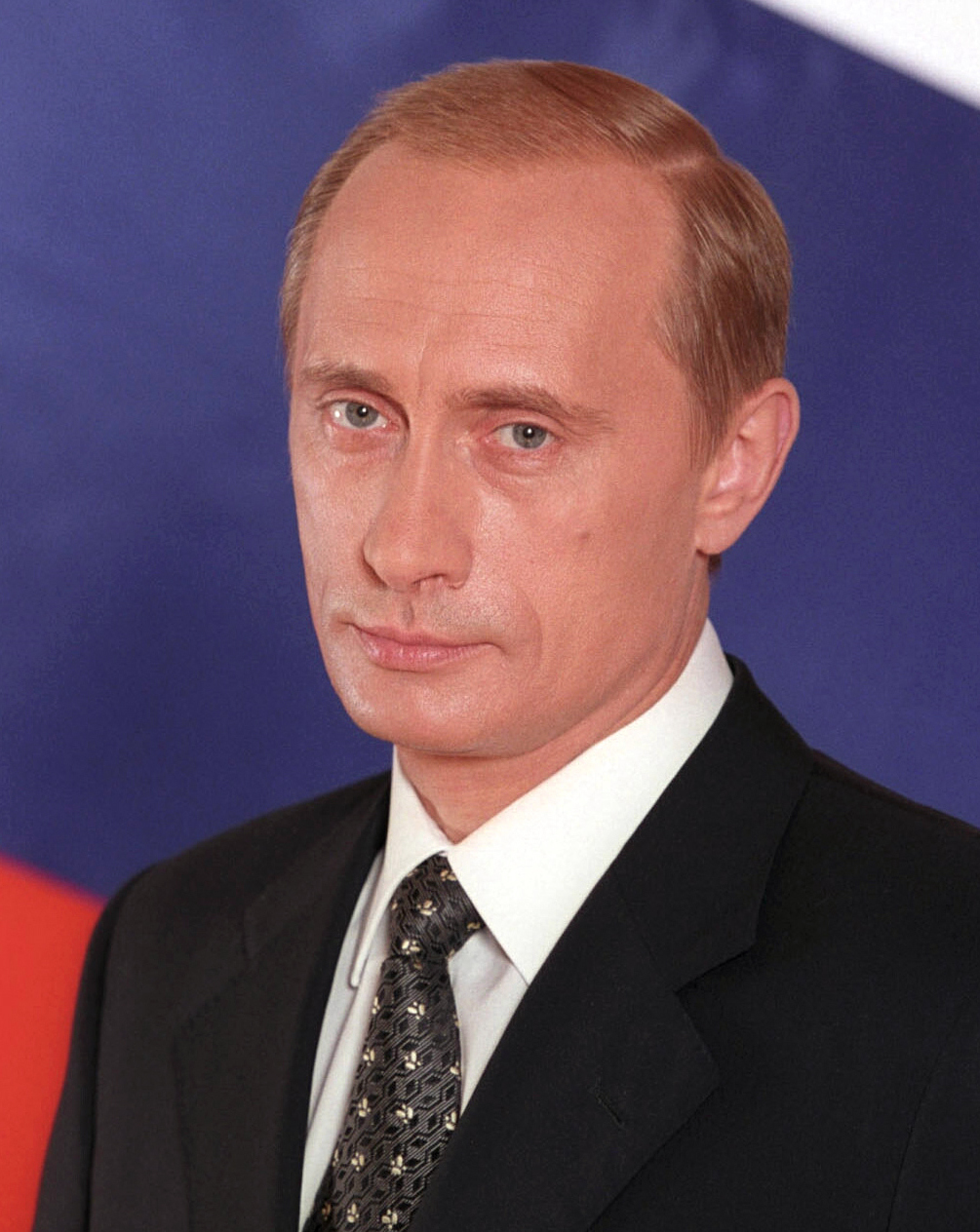
(Russia) Russia
Vladimir Putin,
President

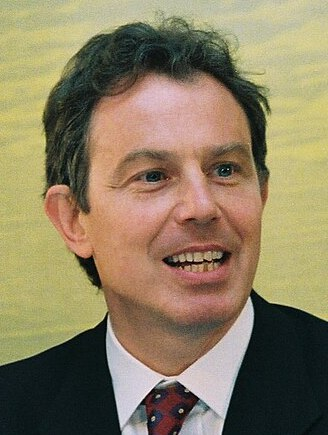
(United Kingdom) United Kingdom
Tony Blair,
Prime Minister

(United States) United States
George W. Bush,
President (Host)
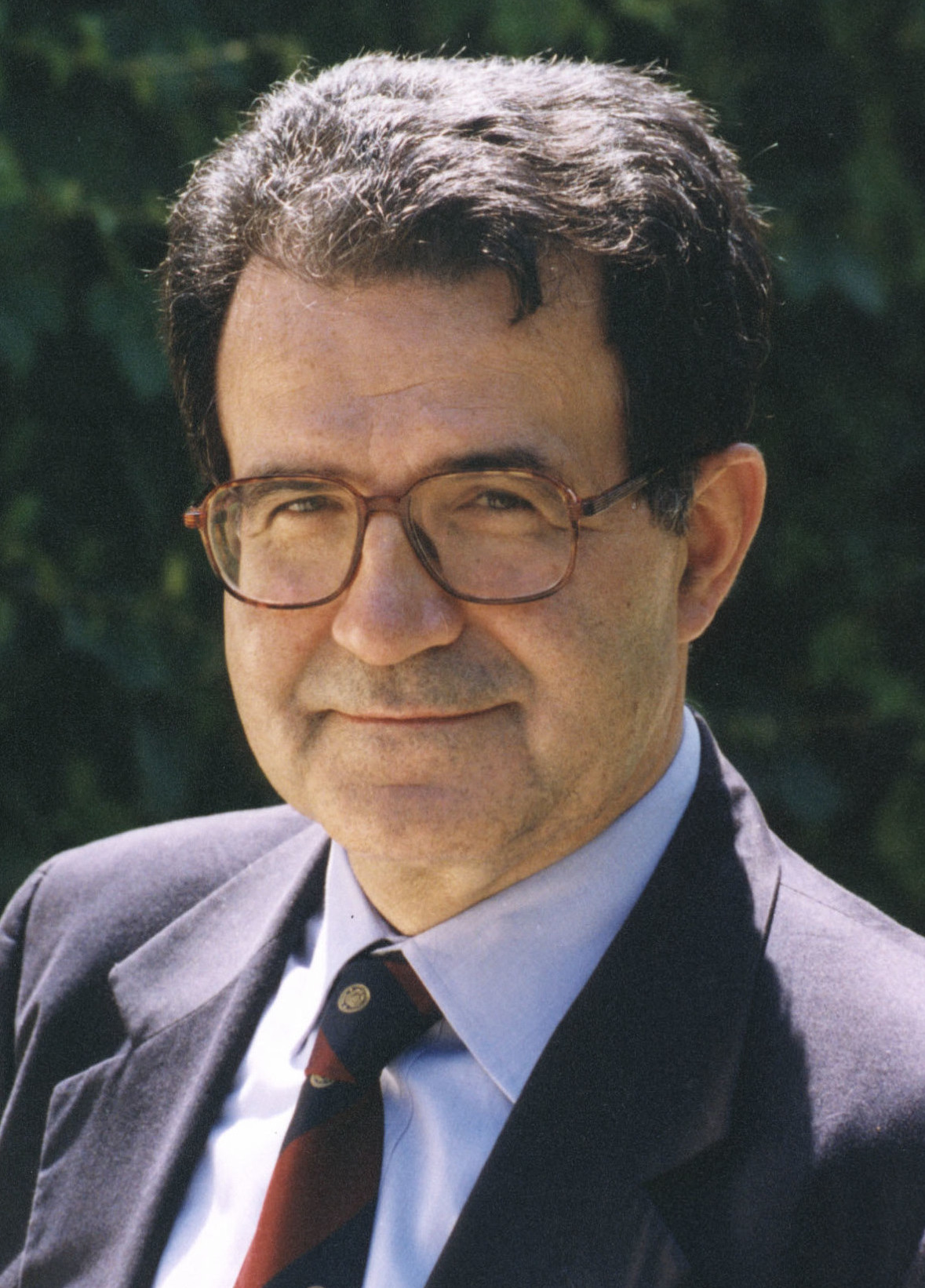
(European Union) European Union
Romano Prodi,
Commission President
