= General Cross =

General Cross may refer to:

- James U. Cross (1925–2015), U.S. Air Force brigadier general
- Jesse Cross (fl. 1970s–2010s), U.S. Army brigadier general
- Tim Cross (born 1951), British Army major general

== See also ==
- Attorney General Cross (disambiguation)
