= List of state funerals of U.S. presidents =

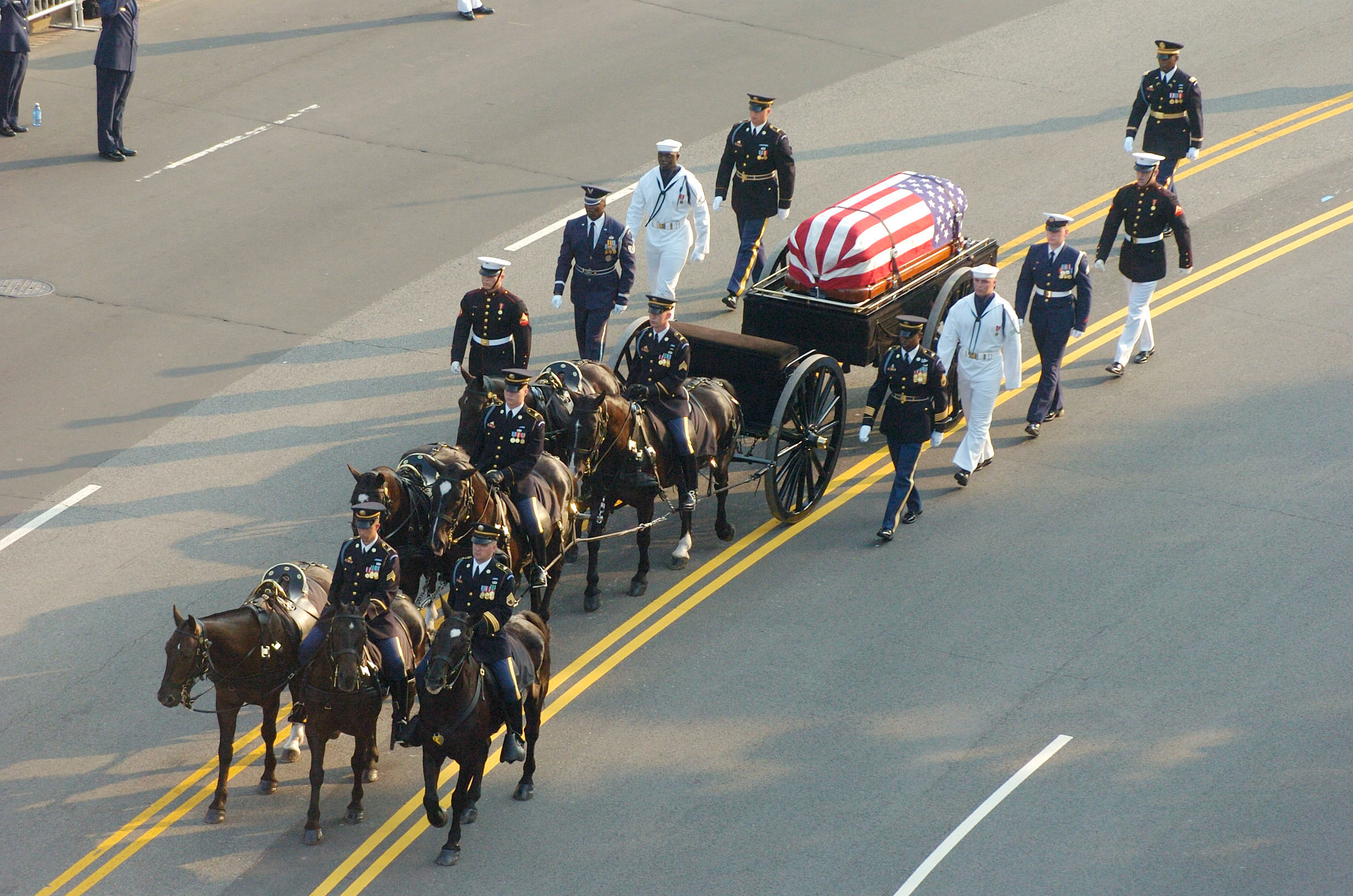
Ronald Reagan casket on caisson during funeral procession, with American flag draped over the coffin

This page is a list of state funerals of presidents of the United States of America.

== Presidents No. 40-49 ==
- Death and state funeral of George H. W. Bush the 41st United States president
- Death and state funeral of Ronald Reagan the 40th United States president

== Presidents No. 30-39 ==
- Death and state funeral of Jimmy Carter, the 39th United States president
- Death and state funeral of Gerald Ford the 38th United States president
- Death and state funeral of Richard Nixon the 37th United States president
- Death and state funeral of Lyndon B. Johnson the 36th United States president
- State funeral of John F. Kennedy the 35th United States president
- State funeral of Dwight D. Eisenhower the 34th United States president
- State funeral of Herbert Hoover the 31st United States president

== Presidents No. 20-29 ==
- State funeral of Warren G. Harding the 29th United States president
- State funeral of William Howard Taft 27th United States president
- State funeral of William McKinley the 25th United States president
- State funeral of James A. Garfield the 20th United States president

== Presidents No. 10-19 ==
- State funeral of Abraham Lincolnthe 16th United States president
  - The state funeral of Abraham Lincoln is considered to be the first instance of a state funeral of former U.S. Presidents

== Presidents No. 1-9 ==
State funerals were not a part of American history during these presidencies. However, the first general state of mourning was declared in the United States upon the death of founding father Benjamin Franklin in 1790.

== See also ==
- Founding Fathers of the United States
- Arlington National Cemetery
- Death and state funeral of Winston Churchill and other state funerals in the United Kingdom
