= VC-137C SAM 26000 =

Air Force VIP Aircraft

SAM 26000
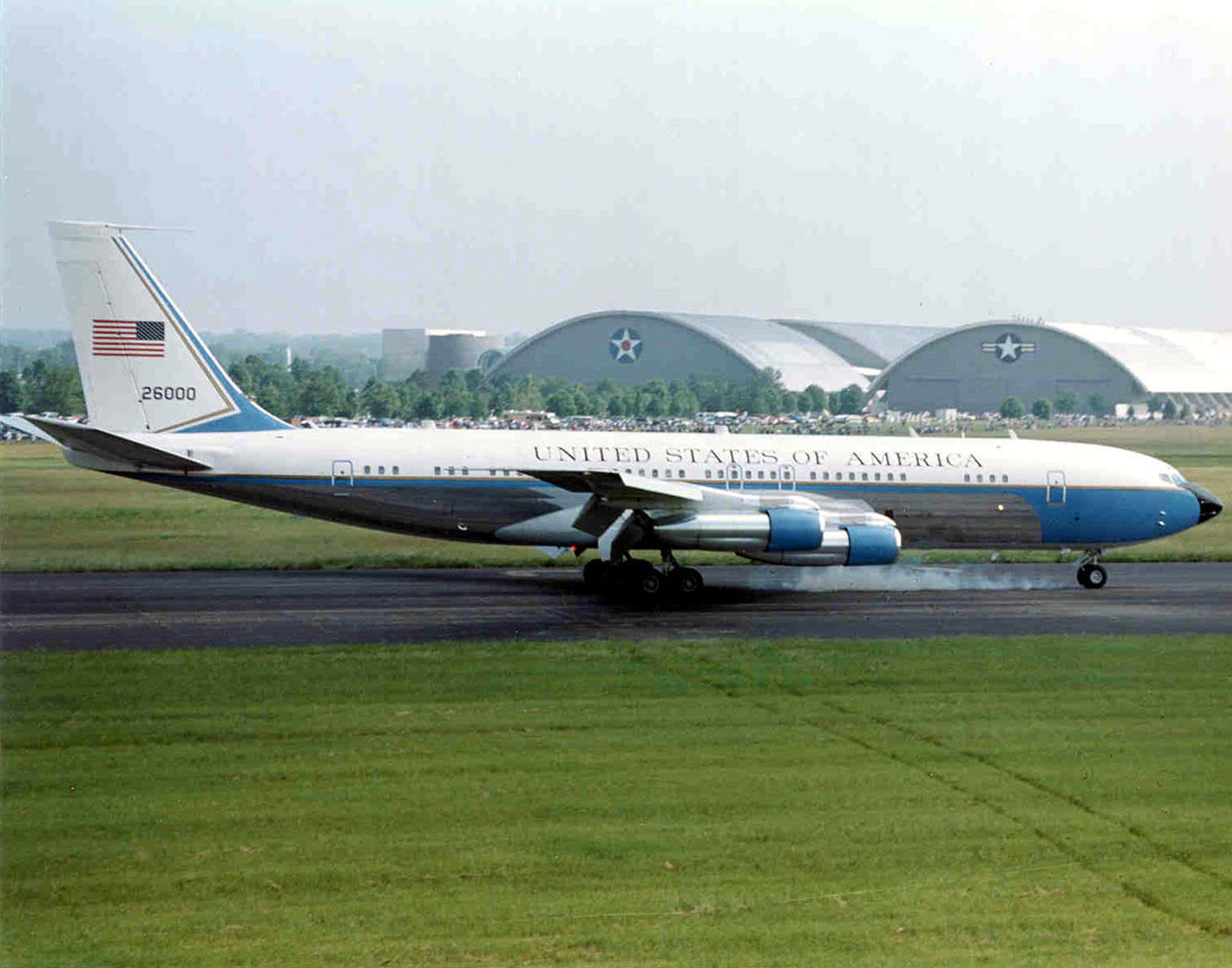

General information
- Other name: "Air Force One"
- Type: Boeing VC-137C
- Status: On display
- Owners: United States Air Force
- Construction number: 18461
- Serial: 62-6000

History
- Manufactured: 1962
- First flight: August 10, 1962
- In service: 1962–1998
- Last flight: May 20th, 1998
- Preserved at: National Museum of the United States Air Force

SAM 26000 is the first of two Boeing VC-137C aircraft specifically configured and maintained for use by the President of the United States. It used the callsign Air Force One when the president was on board, otherwise SAM 26000 (spoken as 'SAM two-six-thousand'), with SAM indicating Special Air Mission.

A Boeing VC-137C with Air Force serial number 62-6000, (Note: It is USAF practice to truncate the serial number as presented on the tail to five-figures, the last figure of the fiscal year and the last four of the serial, hence 26000) SAM 26000 was a customized Boeing 707. It entered service in 1962 during the administration of John F. Kennedy and was replaced in presidential service in 1972 but kept as a backup. The aircraft was finally retired in 1998 and is now on display at the National Museum of the United States Air Force near Dayton, Ohio.

The aircraft was built at Boeing's Renton plant at a cost of $8 million. Raymond Loewy, working with President Kennedy, designed the blue and white color scheme featuring the presidential seal that is still used today. The plane served as the primary means of transportation for three presidents: Kennedy, Lyndon B. Johnson, and Richard Nixon during his first term. In 1972, during the Nixon administration, the plane was replaced by another 707, VC-137C SAM 27000, although SAM 26000 was kept as a back-up plane until 1998.

== John F. Kennedy and Lyndon B. Johnson ==
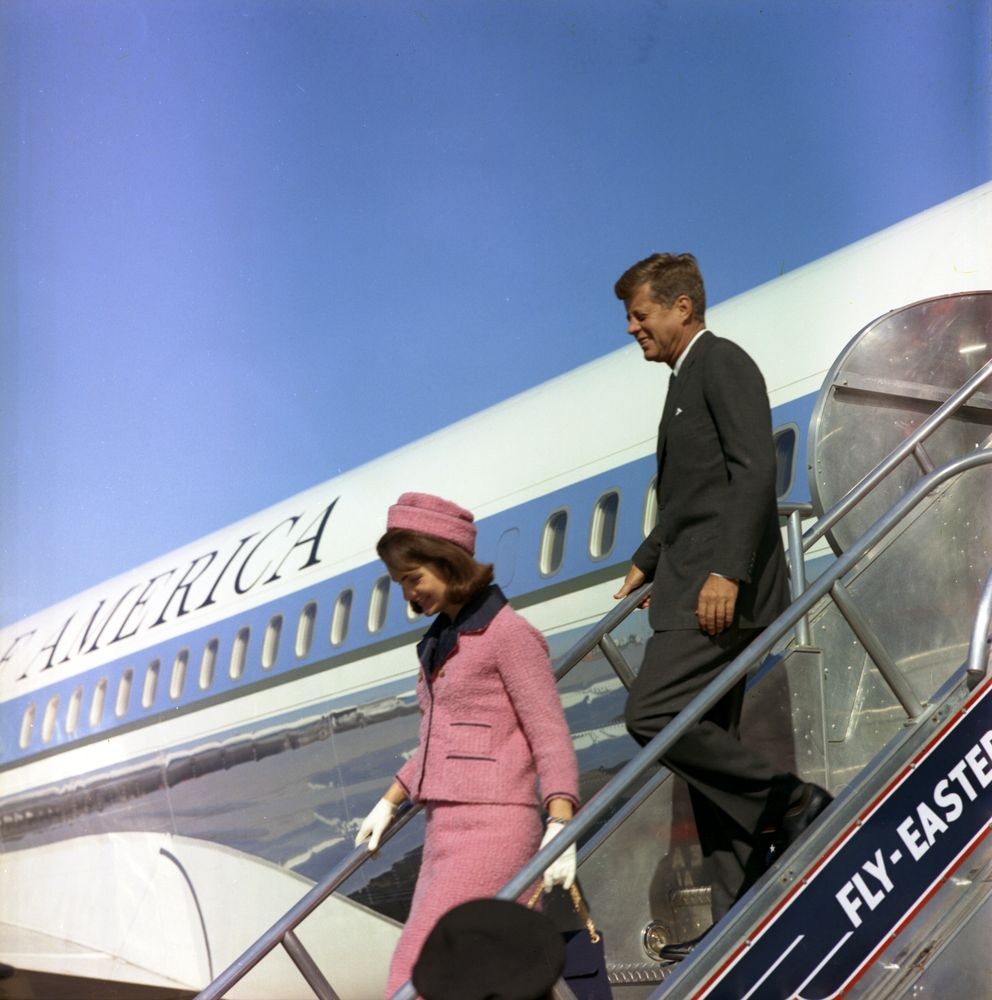
President and Mrs Kennedy deplane from Air Force One

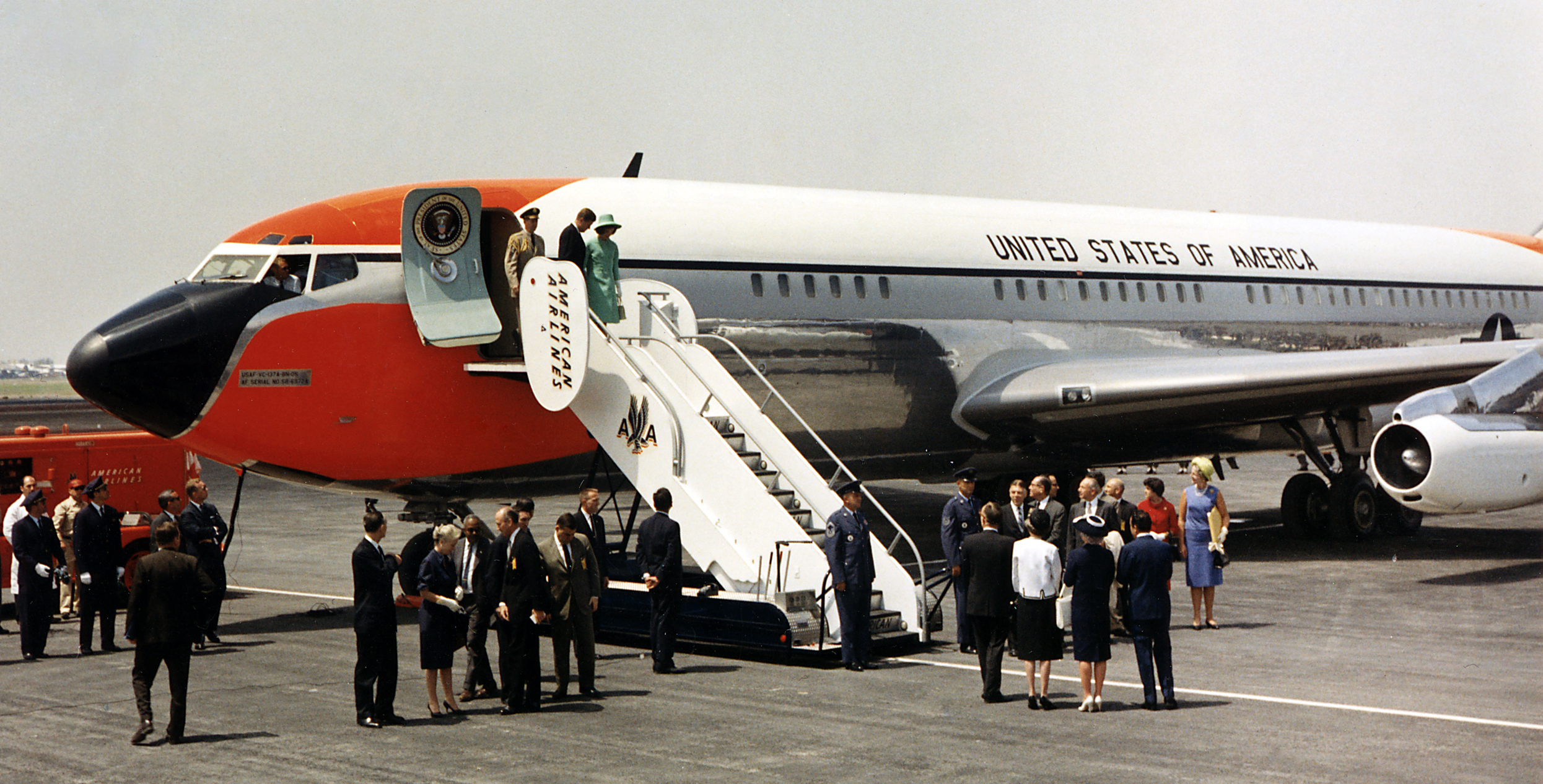
President and Mrs. Kennedy exit the VC-137A previously used as Air Force One in Mexico City in June 1962

John F. Kennedy was the first president to use SAM 26000 in 1962. Kennedy first flew on the aircraft on November 10, 1962, to attend the funeral services of former First Lady Eleanor Roosevelt in Hyde Park, New York. SAM 26000 took Kennedy to Berlin in June 1963 where he made his famous "Ich bin ein Berliner" speech. The month before that, it set 30 speed records, including a new Washington-Moscow time record.

VC-137A aircraft previously used as Air Force One were painted in a livery designed by the Air Force that had a red nose, a shiny metal belly, a white roof and a black cheatline. Designer Raymond Loewy said the design was unimpressive, gaudy and amateurish. He accepted the invitation of First Lady Jacqueline Kennedy, to design a new livery for the future VC-137C. Lowey spent several hours sitting on the floor of the Oval Office with President Kennedy drawing with crayons and cutting up paper to come up with the now-iconic blue, silver, and white design. It was Kennedy that wanted the light blue color (officially called "luminous ultramarine"). The design also features the presidential seal near the nose, a large American flag on the tail, and the words "United States of America" in capital letters that Lowey said were inspired by the first printed copy of the Declaration of Independence which used a typeface known as Caslon.

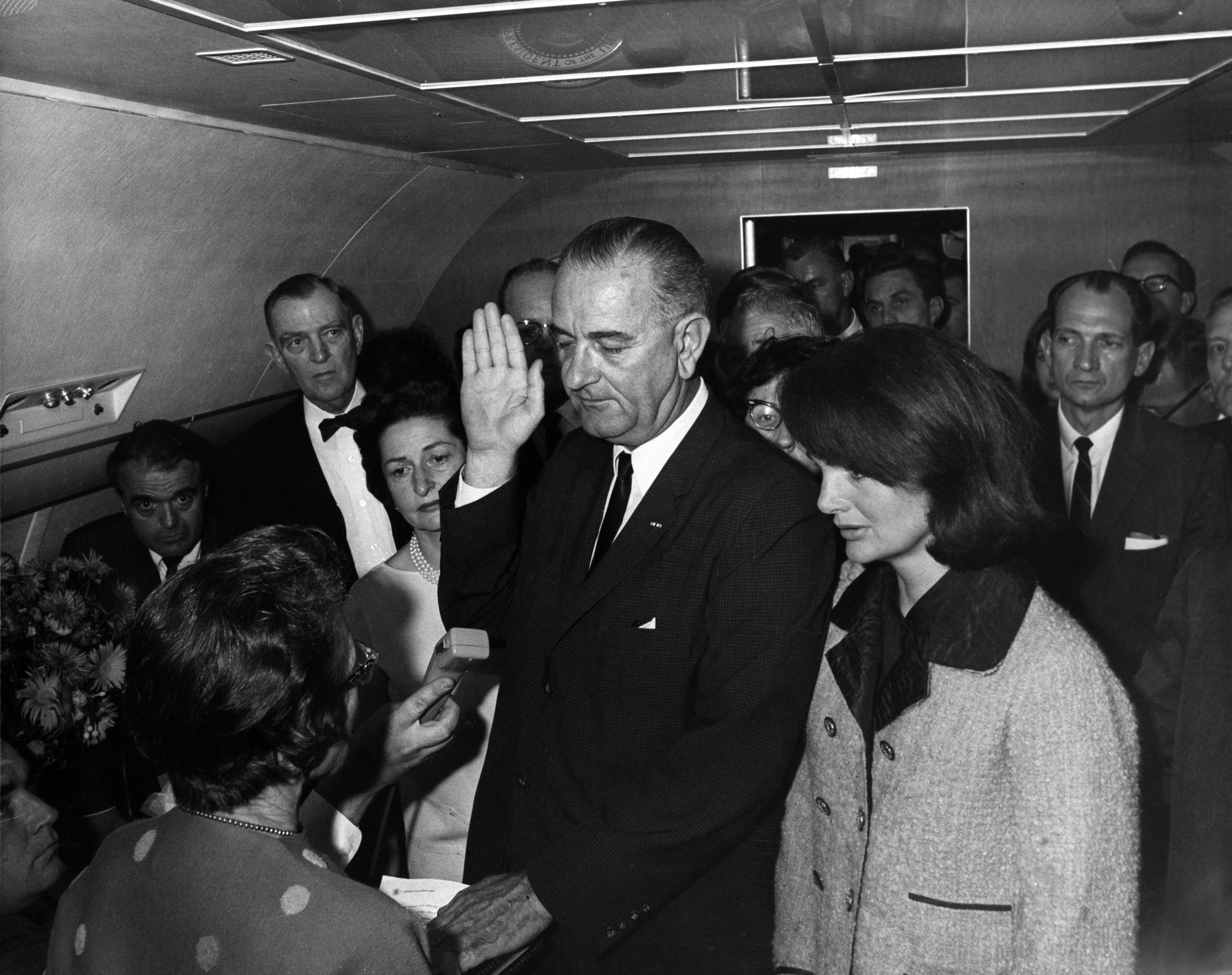
Lyndon Johnson is sworn in as president aboard SAM 26000 following the assassination of John F. Kennedy

On November 22, 1963, after landing the President and First Lady at Dallas' Love Field, SAM 26000 was the backdrop to live broadcasts of the Kennedys greeting well-wishers. Later that day, after Kennedy's assassination made Vice President Lyndon Johnson the new president, SAM 26000 carried the Johnsons, Jacqueline Kennedy, and Kennedy's body back to Washington. To accommodate the casket four seats were removed from the passenger compartment; Johnson took his Oath of Office aboard SAM 26000 before takeoff. Later, as Kennedy was interred in Arlington National Cemetery, SAM 26000 flew overhead, following 50 fighter jets (20 Navy and 30 Air Force).

Johnson was SAM 26000's most frequent flyer, logging some 523,000 miles during his five years as president; he once called it "my own little plane." New seats were installed, now facing rearward toward the presidential cabin, in which was installed a spacious leather chair (dubbed "the throne") and a crescent-shaped table which the president could raise and lower by means of a switch. Aides and guests sat on couches around "the throne."

Johnson flew in SAM 26000 twice to Vietnam and took tours of Asia in 1968 and 1969. In 1967, Johnson went on a largely unplanned aerial odyssey, making stops in California, Hawaii, Australia, Thailand, South Vietnam, Pakistan, and Italy.

== Richard M. Nixon ==
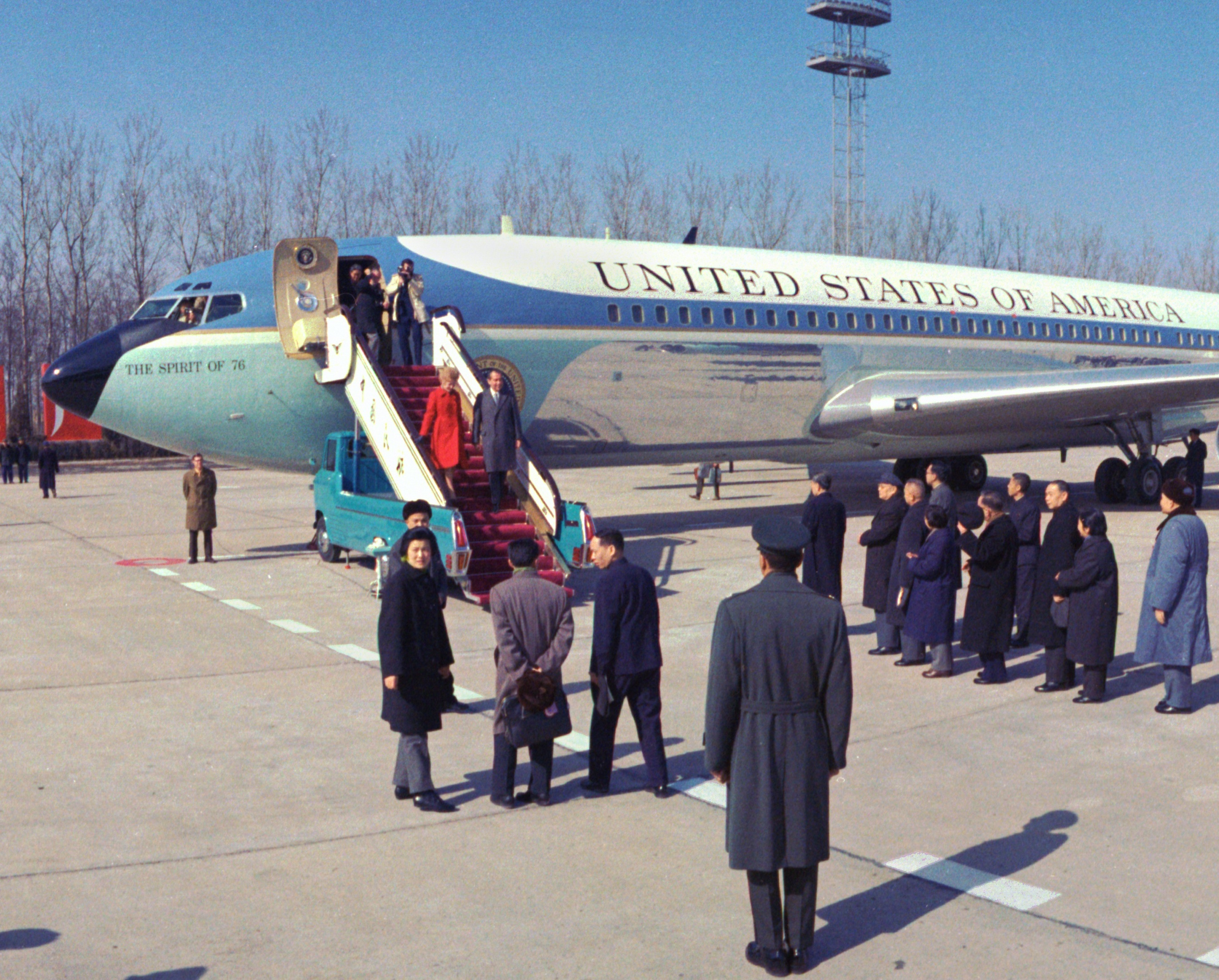
President Richard Nixon and First Lady Pat Nixon disembark SAM 26000 after landing in the People's Republic of China, 1972

Upon the inauguration of Richard Nixon in 1969, SAM 26000 underwent repairs and upgrades. Nixon and his staff were offered a key role in the redesigning of the plane, a position they took up, and indeed, the finished plane reflected the new president's persona. The interior of the plane was stripped from the nose to the tail; all minor problems were taken care of; upgrades were made on the flight management system; communications gear was slightly modified. Richard Nixon had the interior of the plane redesigned to suit his fancy. Nixon did away with the open floor plan of the Johnson era and replaced it with a three-room suite for himself and his family, serving as a combination of lounge, office, and bedrooms. Accommodations for guests, aides, security and media personnel were located aft of the three rooms.

Although SAM 27000 took over as the primary presidential aircraft in 1972, Nixon's family preferred SAM 26000 because its interior configuration allowed greater privacy for the First Family. Nixon also had the name "The Spirit of '76" applied to the nose of both VC-137Cs. The Nixons flew on SAM 26000 to China in 1972, becoming the first American President and First Lady to visit that nation. SAM 26000 was also used by National Security Advisor Henry Kissinger during his secret meetings with the French to negotiate the Vietnam peace process. In December 1972, SAM 27000 took over as the primary presidential plane.

== Missions after replacement ==
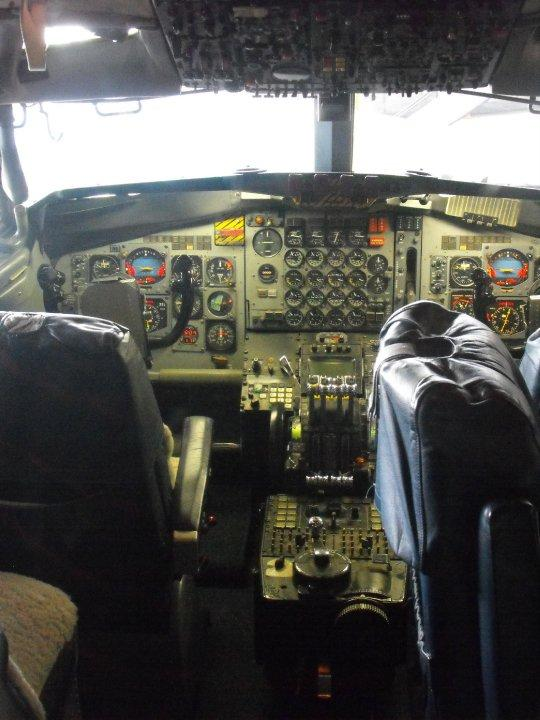
The cockpit of the aircraft

=== State funeral of LBJ ===
On January 22, 1973, Lyndon B. Johnson died. Two days later, SAM 26000 brought the former president's body from Texas to Washington, D.C. for a state funeral the following day. After the funeral, the aircraft returned his body to Texas for burial, landing at Bergstrom Air Force Base in Austin. Later that same day, as Johnson was interred at his ranch, retired Brigadier General James U. Cross, pilot of SAM 26000 during part of the Johnson presidency, presented the flag to Lady Bird Johnson. He also escorted her during the state funeral.

=== Other notable missions ===
On October 6, 1981, Egyptian President Anwar Sadat was assassinated. Because of security concerns, President Ronald Reagan did not attend the funeral. Instead, he sent Secretary of State Alexander Haig. The living former presidents—Nixon, Ford, and Carter— as well as former secretary of state Henry Kissinger also attended. All of them flew aboard SAM 26000 when traveling to the funeral.

The last time SAM 26000 carried a serving president was in January 1998 when President Bill Clinton's Air Force One, SAM 27000, got stuck in the mud near Savoy, Illinois, at University of Illinois Willard Airport. SAM 26000 was sitting at Grissom Air Reserve Base in Peru, Indiana, to serve as the backup Air Force One. SAM 26000 was quickly dispatched to Champaign to pick up President Clinton, who then flew to La Crosse, Wisconsin, for an event and then flew the final presidential service flight from La Crosse to Washington, D.C., where SAM 26000 was then officially retired from the president's fleet.

== Current status ==
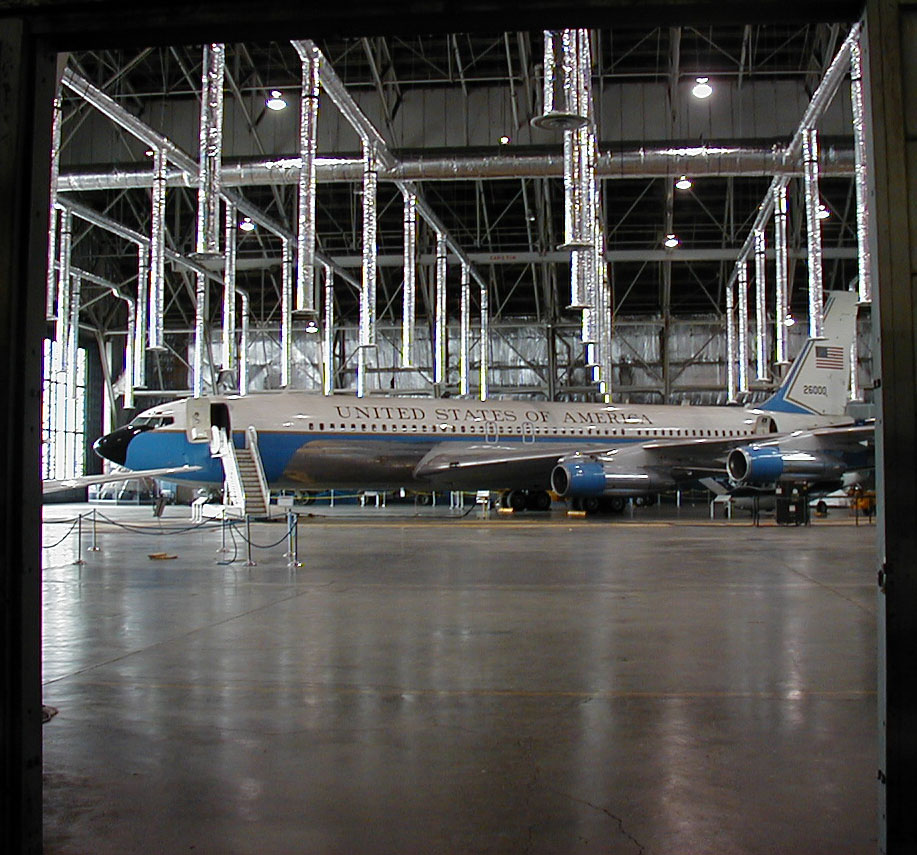
SAM 26000 at the USAF Museum, June, 2003.

In May 1998, SAM 26000 was flown to the National Museum of the United States Air Force at Wright-Patterson AFB near Dayton, Ohio. Its final flight was staged over the museum grounds for the benefit of the media and museum visitors. The aircraft circled the museum several times at low altitude before finally landing on the original Wright Field airstrip alongside the museum.

The plane taxied to the museum's restoration hangars and the crew disembarked, while members of the press explored the aircraft. After several months of work by the museum's restoration staff, the aircraft was placed on permanent display in the museum's Presidential Hangar. The public can walk through the aircraft; while the original intent (according to museum personnel) was to restore the aircraft to how it looked when Kennedy was President, it was later determined to leave the aircraft interior as it looked when it was delivered to the U.S. Air Force Museum in May 1998.

In December 2009, SAM 26000 was taken off display and moved to the museum's restoration area, where it was repainted into its Presidential paint scheme. SAM 26000 was later returned to the Presidential Planes Hangar at the museum.

== See also ==
Related development

- VC-137C SAM 27000
- C-137 Stratoliner
- Boeing 707
