= Boeing Stratoliner =

Boeing Stratoliner may refer to:

- Boeing 307 Stratoliner, a 1930s high-altitude airliner, which was used as the C-75 by the USAAF in World War II.
- Boeing C-137 Stratoliner, a 1960s military VIP transport version of the Boeing 707
