= Boeing E-7 =

Boeing E-7 may refer to:

- Boeing E-7 ARIA, the original designation assigned by the United States Air Force under the Mission Designation System to the EC-18B Advanced Range Instrumentation Aircraft.
- Boeing E-7 Wedgetail, the designation assigned by the Royal Australian Air Force to the Boeing 737 AEW&C (airborne early warning and control) aircraft.
