= C-137 =

C-137 may refer to:

- Boeing C-137 Stratoliner, an airplane
- Dimension C-137, a setting in the Rick and Morty television series

== See also ==
- Caesium-137 (Cs-137), a radioactive isotope of caesium
