= VC-137C SAM 27000 =

Presidential aircraft

SAM 27000
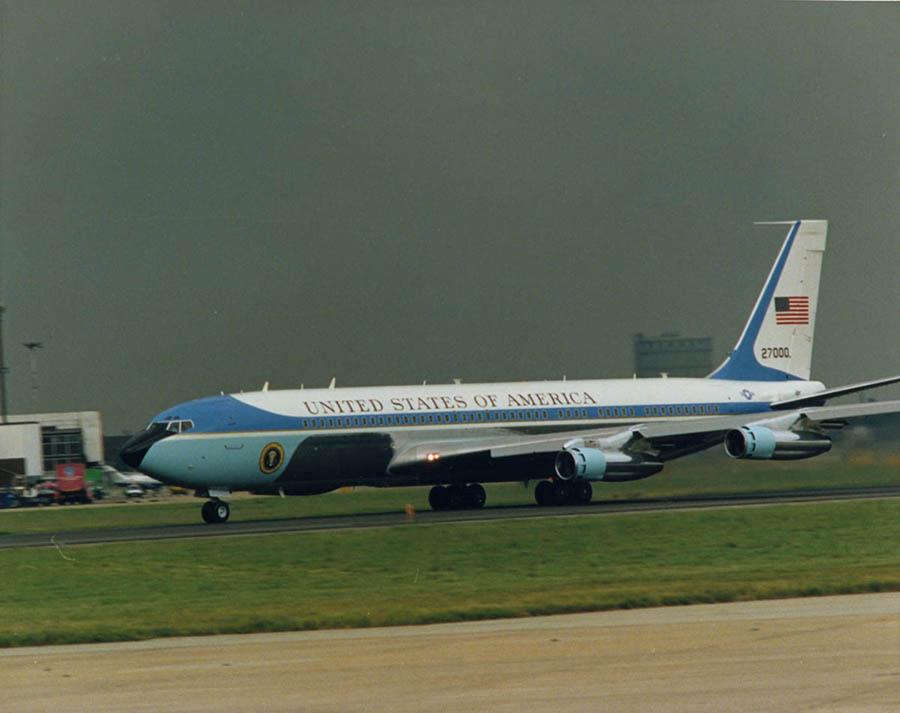
- SAM 27000 taking off from Heathrow Airport

General information
- Other name: "Air Force One"
- Type: Boeing VC-137C
- Status: Preserved, on display
- Owners: United States Air Force
- Construction number: 20630
- Serial: 72-7000

History
- Manufactured: 1972
- First flight: July 31, 1972
- In service: August 9, 1972 - August 29, 2001
- Last flight: August 29, 2001
- Preserved at: Ronald Reagan Presidential Library

SAM 27000 is the second of the two Boeing VC-137C aircraft that were specifically configured and maintained for the use of the president of the United States. It used the call sign Air Force One when the president was on board, and at other times it used the call sign SAM 27000 (spoken as 'SAM two-seven-thousand'), with SAM indicating 'Special Air Mission.' The VC-137C serial number 72-7000 (Note: It is USAF practice to truncate the serial number as presented on the tail to five-figures, the last figure of the fiscal year and the last four of the serial, hence 27000) is a customized version of the Boeing 707 which entered service during the Nixon administration in 1972. It served all US presidents until George W. Bush and was retired in 2001. It is now on display at the Ronald Reagan Presidential Library.

== Operational history ==
The aircraft first entered service in 1972 during the administration of Richard Nixon. SAM 27000 replaced the aging SAM 26000 as the primary means of presidential travel, although SAM 26000 remained as a back-up plane. SAM 27000 served seven presidents in its twenty-nine years of service: Richard Nixon, Gerald Ford, Jimmy Carter, Ronald Reagan, George H. W. Bush, Bill Clinton, and George W. Bush. In 1990, it was replaced as the primary presidential plane by two Boeing VC-25A jumbo jets — SAM 28000 and 29000.

=== Nixon and Ford ===
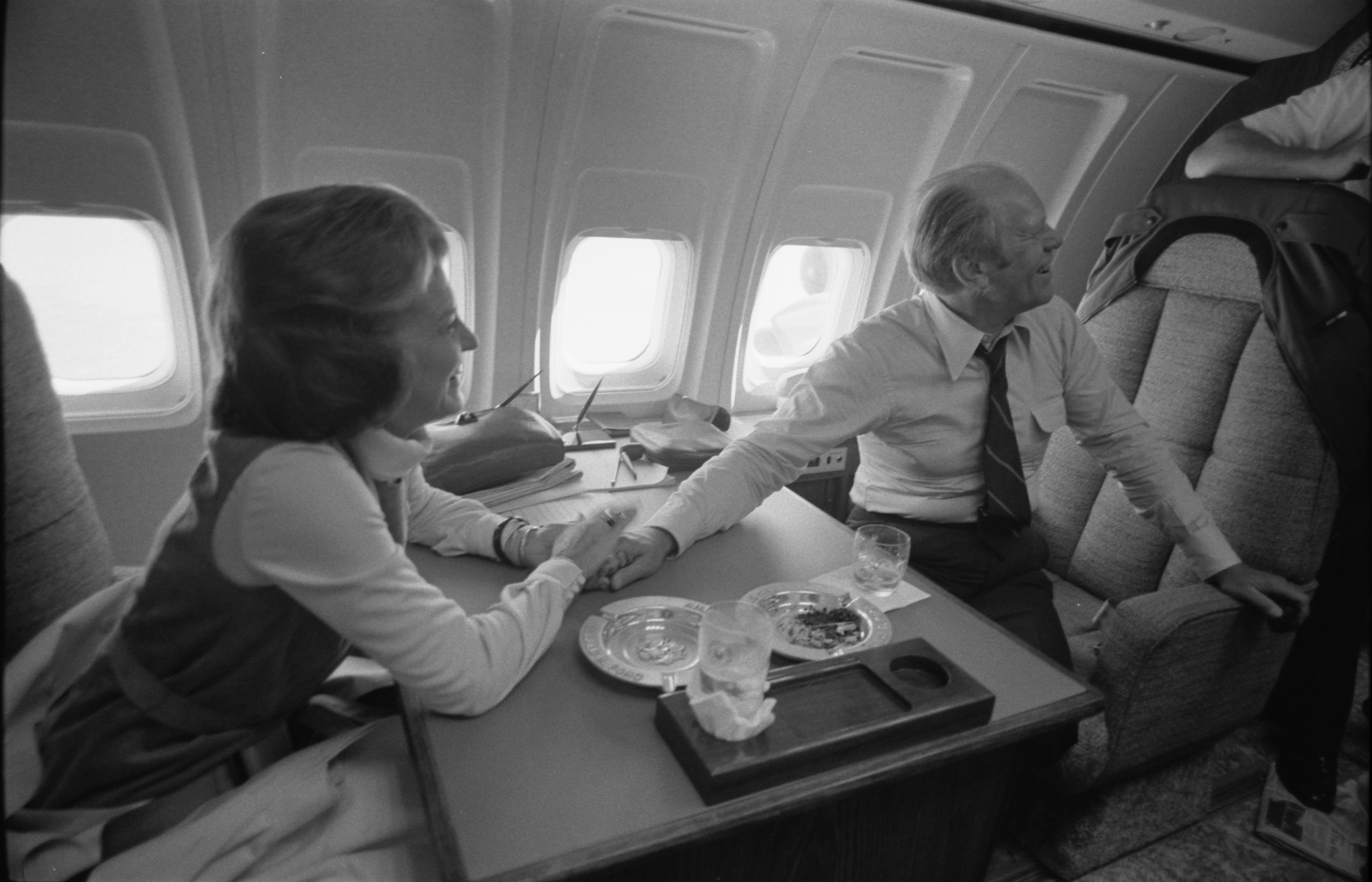
The Fords in the President's forward cabin on SAM 27000

Nixon was the first president to use this Air Force One, dubbing it and its sister plane, SAM 26000, the "Spirit of '76", having that phrase painted on the nose of the two aircraft, although later removed by President Carter. Although SAM 27000 replaced SAM 26000 as Nixon's primary mode of aerial transportation, he chose to ride SAM 26000 when his family flew with him. Nixon garnered much attention for his frequent flying aboard Air Force One, usually flying to his homes in California and Florida, but also made many trips abroad, such as his trip to China in 1972. Top presidential aides and cabinet secretaries used the plane as well, including Secretary of State Henry Kissinger. When President Nixon resigned the presidency on August 9, 1974, he flew to his home in Orange County, California aboard SAM 27000. While flying over Missouri en route to their destination, Colonel Ralph Albertazzie, the pilot, contacted Kansas City Center and had the aircraft's call sign changed from Air Force One to SAM 27000 due to Gerald Ford being sworn in.

Gerald Ford used SAM 27000 somewhat frequently, especially for his trips abroad, such as his meeting with Soviet Premier Leonid Brezhnev in Vladivostok in 1974. After experiencing two assassination attempts, Ford returned to the plane to hear his wife Betty quip "Well, how did they treat you in San Francisco?" During the Ford years, there was a growing number of airline hijackings and the threat of terrorism expanded, so both SAM 27000 and 26000 were equipped with defense systems to detect heat-seeking missiles. It was President Ford who first decided that the name of the aircraft itself should be Air Force One, along with the call sign.

=== Carter and Reagan ===
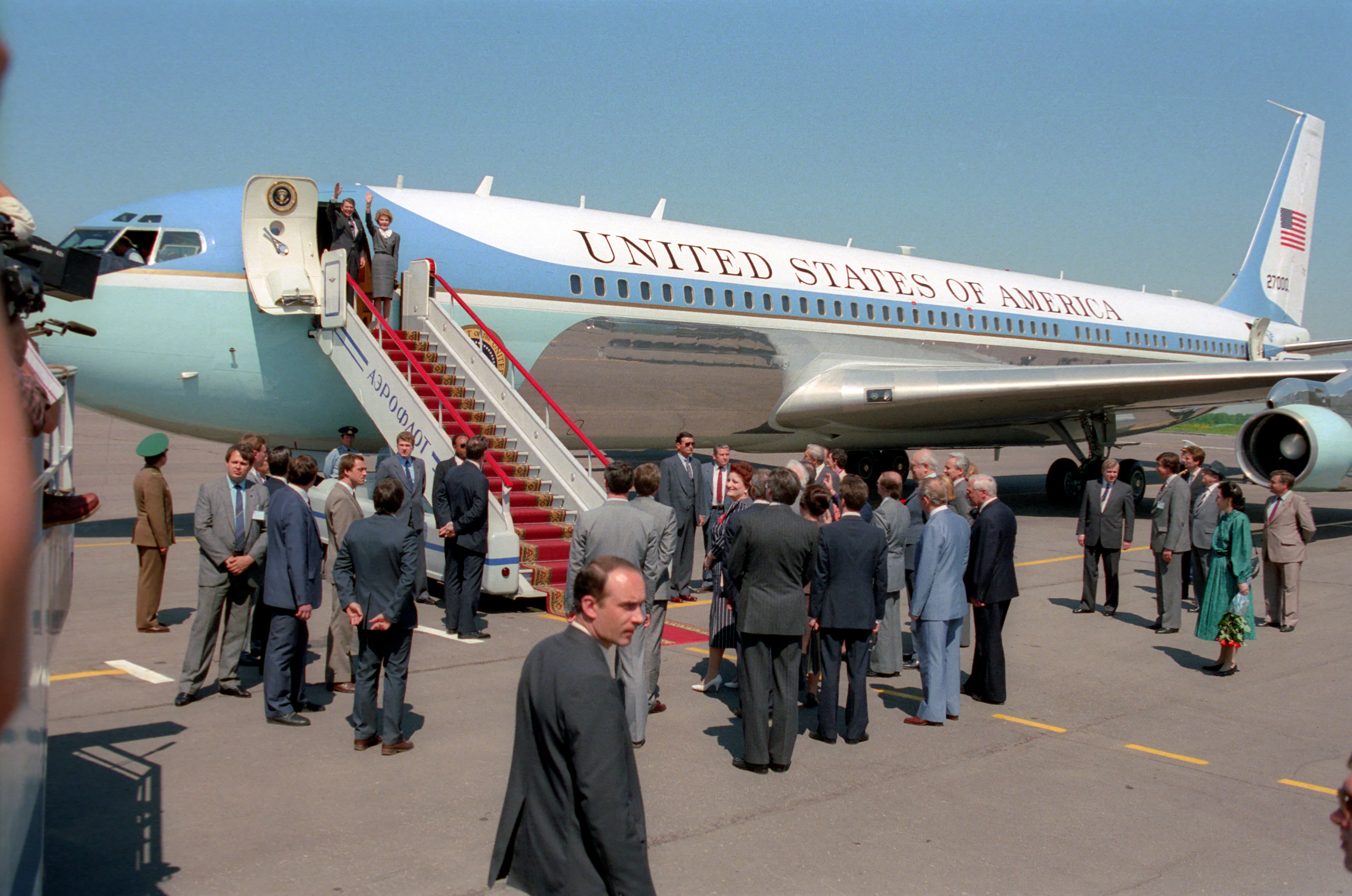
Ronald and Nancy Reagan wave from SAM 27000 as they prepare to descend the stairs upon the plane's landing in Moscow, Russian SFSR, 1988

Jimmy Carter made some changes to the aircraft that reflected his personal values. Carter preferred a simpler style of living, something he made apparent on SAM 27000; he even insisted that he and his family carry their own luggage aboard. Carter made regular use of the plane both for domestic use and for use abroad. In 1980, after the American Hockey Team defeated the Soviet Team, Carter sent SAM 27000 to pick up the team and bring them back to Washington, D.C. for a congratulatory ceremony. Carter's last trip aboard 27000 was actually taken as a former president, when Ronald Reagan sent Carter to Germany on behalf of the American people, to welcome home the 52 American hostages that were held captive in Iran.

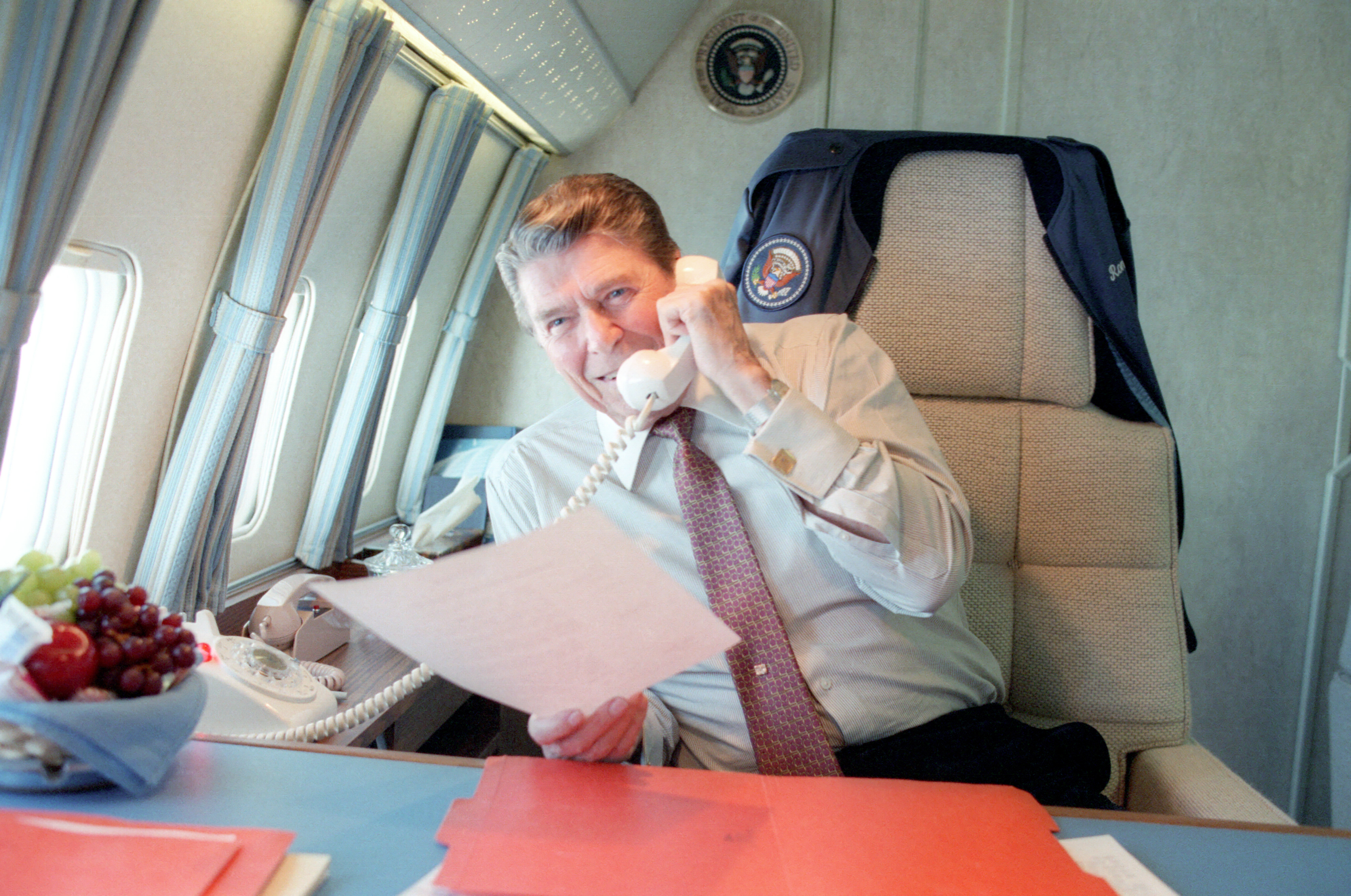
Ronald Reagan works aboard SAM 27000 in 1986

Ronald Reagan was SAM 27000's most frequent flyer, flying longer and farther than all the other presidents who flew on it, traveling more than 675,000 miles aboard it. Reagan used Air Force One to travel to all parts of the world to pursue his ambitious diplomatic goals, taking three trips to Asia, six to Europe, and twelve trips to foreign places in the Western Hemisphere. Reagan flew to three of his four summit meetings with Soviet Leader Mikhail Gorbachev aboard SAM 27000: Geneva, Reykjavík, and Moscow (the other being held in Washington, D.C.). The Reagans' last flight aboard the plane was on January 20, 1989, when the then-former President and First Lady flew back to California.

=== Missions after replacement ===
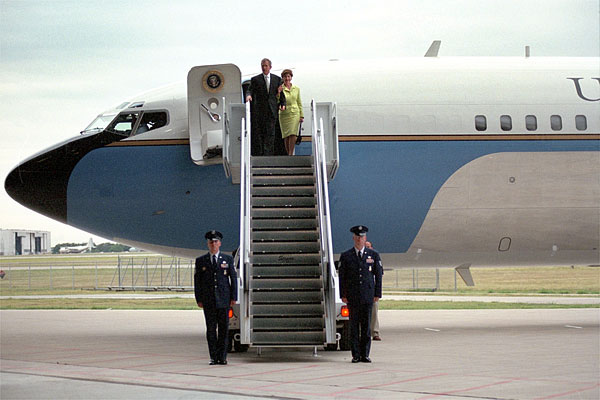
George W. Bush and Laura Bush arrive in Waco, Texas after the completion of the last Presidential voyage of SAM 27000, August 2001

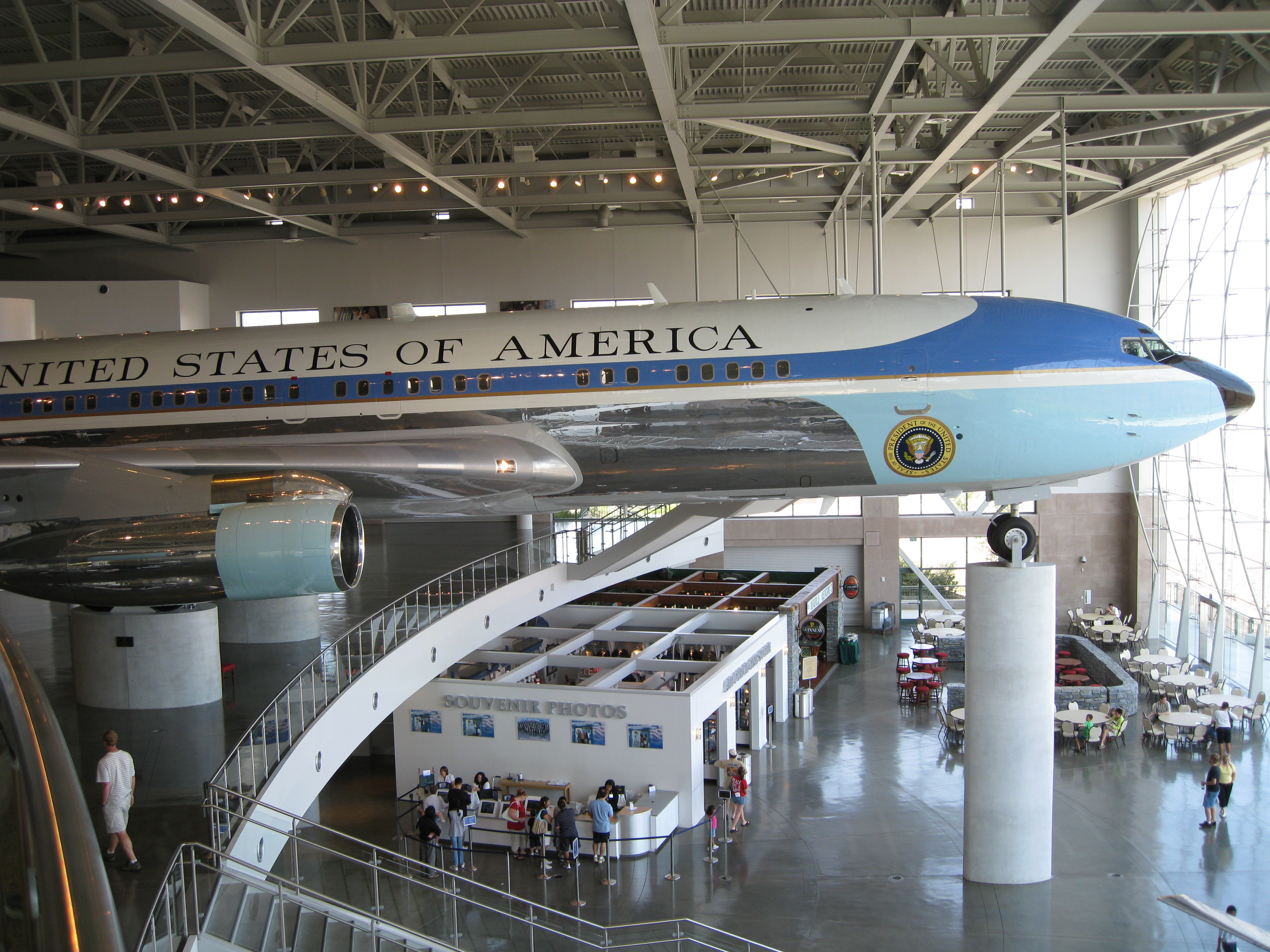
The plane in the Reagan Library

George H. W. Bush was the last president to use SAM 27000 as the primary means of presidential travel, as in 1990 the plane was replaced by two Boeing 747-200B jumbo jets, designated VC-25, although SAM 27000 was kept as a backup plane for Bush during the remainder of his presidency, as well as those of Bill Clinton and George W. Bush.

Former President Richard Nixon died on April 22, 1994, in New York City. SAM 27000 brought his body to the Marine Corps Air Station El Toro in Orange County, California, four days later. His body was then taken to the Richard Nixon Library and Birthplace (now Richard Nixon Presidential Library and Museum) to lie in state before a funeral service and burial.

Its last Presidential voyage was August 29, 2001, when it delivered George W. Bush and Laura Bush to TSTC Waco Airport en route to their Prairie Chapel Ranch.

=== Reagan Library ===
SAM 27000 was decommissioned and flown to San Bernardino International Airport (formerly Norton Air Force Base) in September 2001, where it was presented to the Reagan Foundation. In what was known as Operation Homeward Bound, Boeing, the plane's manufacturer, disassembled the plane and transported it to the library in pieces. After the construction of the foundation of the pavilion itself, the plane was reassembled and restored to museum quality, as well as raised onto pedestals 25 ft (7.6 m) above ground. The pavilion was dedicated on October 24, 2005, by Nancy Reagan, President George W. Bush, and First Lady Laura Bush.

== See also ==
Related development

- VC-137C SAM 26000
- Boeing C-137 Stratoliner
- Boeing 707
