= Attorney General Cross =

Attorney General Cross may refer to:

- Eric William Blake Cross (1904–1965), Attorney General of Ontario
- James Albert Cross (1876–1952), Attorney-General of Saskatchewan

== See also ==
- General Cross (disambiguation)
