= Death and state funeral of Richard Nixon =

1994 funeral of the 37th U.S. president

State funeral of Richard Nixon
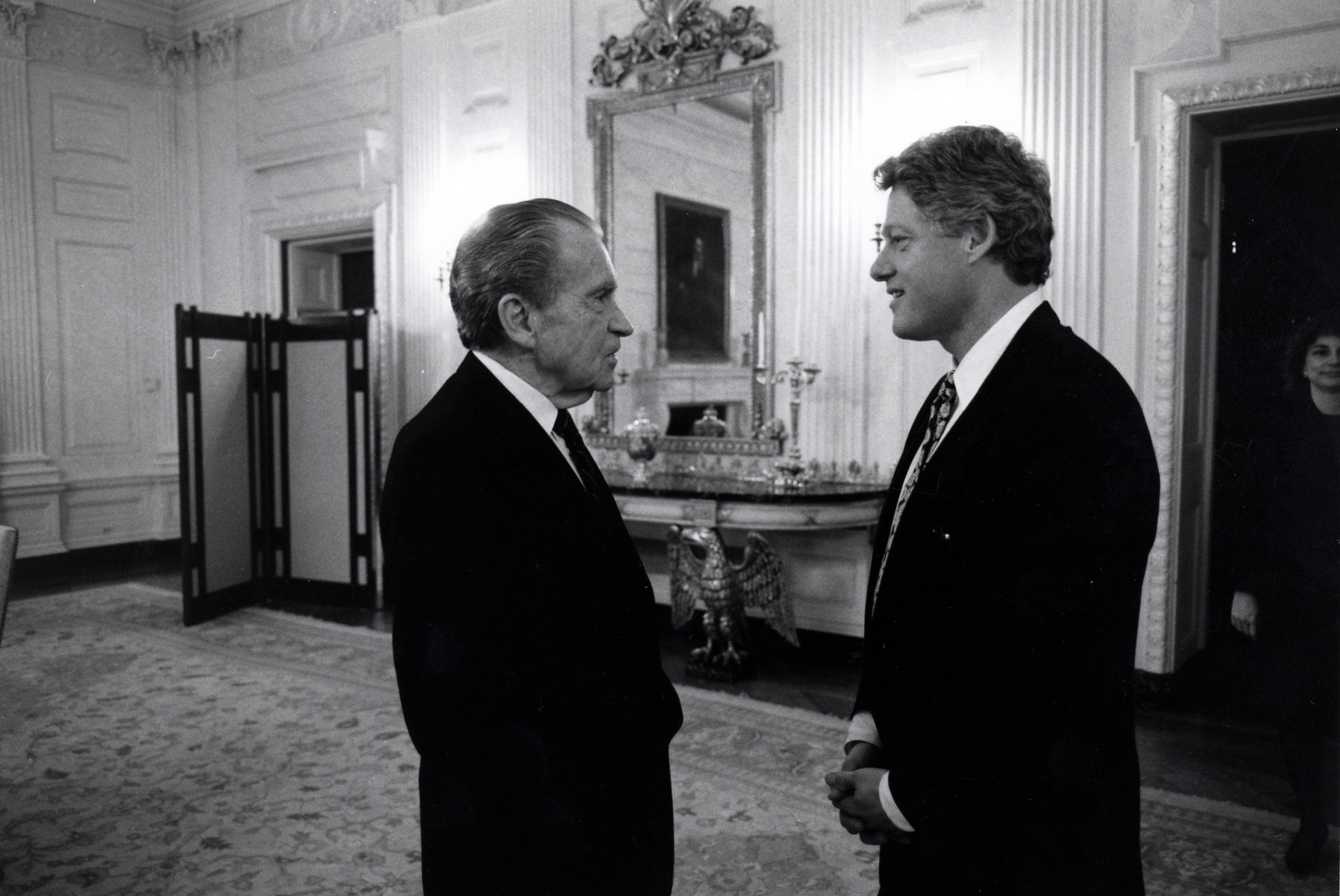
- Richard Nixon (left) in 1993 with president Bill Clinton (right), a year before his death.
- Location: Richard Nixon Presidential Library and Museum, Yorba Linda, California, U.S.
- Organized by: President Bill Clinton
- Participants: Gerald Ford; Jimmy Carter; Ronald Reagan; George H. W. Bush; Bill Clinton; Spiro Agnew; Bob Dole; Henry Kissinger; Pete Wilson; Sir Edward Heath; Zou Jiahua; Betty Ford; Rosalynn Carter; Nancy Reagan; Barbara Bush; Hillary Clinton; George McGovern; Charles Colson; Alexander Haig; Elliot Richardson

On April 22, 1994, Richard Nixon, the 37th president of the United States and the 36th vice president, died after suffering a major stroke four days earlier, at the age of 81.

His state funeral was held five days later at the Richard Nixon Presidential Library and Museum in his home town of Yorba Linda, California. He was the first former president to die in 21 years since Lyndon B. Johnson in 1973, during Nixon's presidency.

Nixon's wife, Pat, died on June 22, 1993. Just under ten months later, on April 18, 1994, at 5:45 p.m, Nixon had a cerebrovascular accident at his home in Park Ridge, New Jersey, and was taken to New York Hospital–Cornell Medical Center. After an initial favorable prognosis, Nixon slipped into a deep coma and died four days later at the age of 81. His body was flown to Marine Corps Air Station El Toro in Orange County, California, via SAM 27000, the presidential plane used as Air Force One while Nixon was in office. His body was transported to the Nixon Library and laid in repose. A public memorial service was held on April 27, attended by world dignitaries from 85 countries and all five living U.S. presidents.

Nixon's state funeral was unique among recent presidential state funerals in that, in accordance with his own wishes, none of the elements of the state ceremonies occurred in the nation's capital.

== Death and tributes ==
Nixon suffered a significant stroke at his Park Ridge, New Jersey home, while preparing to eat dinner on Monday, April 18, 1994, at 5:45 p.m. EDT. An ambulance was called and he was taken to New York Hospital–Cornell Medical Center. He was conscious but unable to speak, and his vision was impaired. It was determined that a blood clot resulting from his heart condition had formed in his left atrium (upper heart), then broke off and traveled to his brain. His condition was determined to be stable the following day, as he was alert but unable to speak or move his right arm and leg. Nixon's prognosis was hopeful, and he was moved from the intensive care unit into a private room. His condition worsened that Tuesday night, however, complicated by symptoms of cerebral edema, or swelling of the brain. Nixon's living will stipulated that he was not to be placed on a ventilator to sustain his life. On Thursday, April 21, Nixon quickly sank into a deep coma. The following night, he died at 9:08 p.m., April 22, 1994. He was 81 years old. His daughters, Tricia and Julie, were by his side. The Vander Plaat Funeral Home in Wyckoff, New Jersey handled his funeral arrangements, just as they did for Pat Nixon.

U.S. President Bill Clinton announced Nixon's death in the White House Rose Garden and proclaimed a national day of mourning five days later. Clinton stated that Nixon was "a statesman who sought to build a lasting structure of peace" and praised his "desire to give something back to this world." Clinton said that he was "deeply grateful to President Nixon for his wise counsel." Tributes also came from the former presidents Gerald Ford, Jimmy Carter, Ronald Reagan and George H. W. Bush. The former secretary of state Henry Kissinger, the former South Dakota Senator George McGovern (who ran against Nixon in the 1972 presidential election), the former senator Howard Baker, Senator Bob Dole, Senator John McCain and Senator Ted Kennedy also reflected on Nixon's death. Malaysian Prime Minister Mahathir Mohamad extended his condolences to Bill Clinton on the death of Nixon.

== Events in California ==
=== Transportation to the Nixon Library ===
Following the news of Nixon's death, tributes were placed at the Richard Nixon Presidential Library in Yorba Linda, California, the site of his birthplace. On April 26, the casket was placed into VC-137C SAM 27000, a member of the presidential fleet used as Air Force One while Nixon was in office, and flown from Stewart Air Force Base in Orange County, New York, to Marine Corps Air Station El Toro, Orange County, California. The body was transported in a motorcade, by hearse, to the Nixon Library.

=== Lying in repose ===
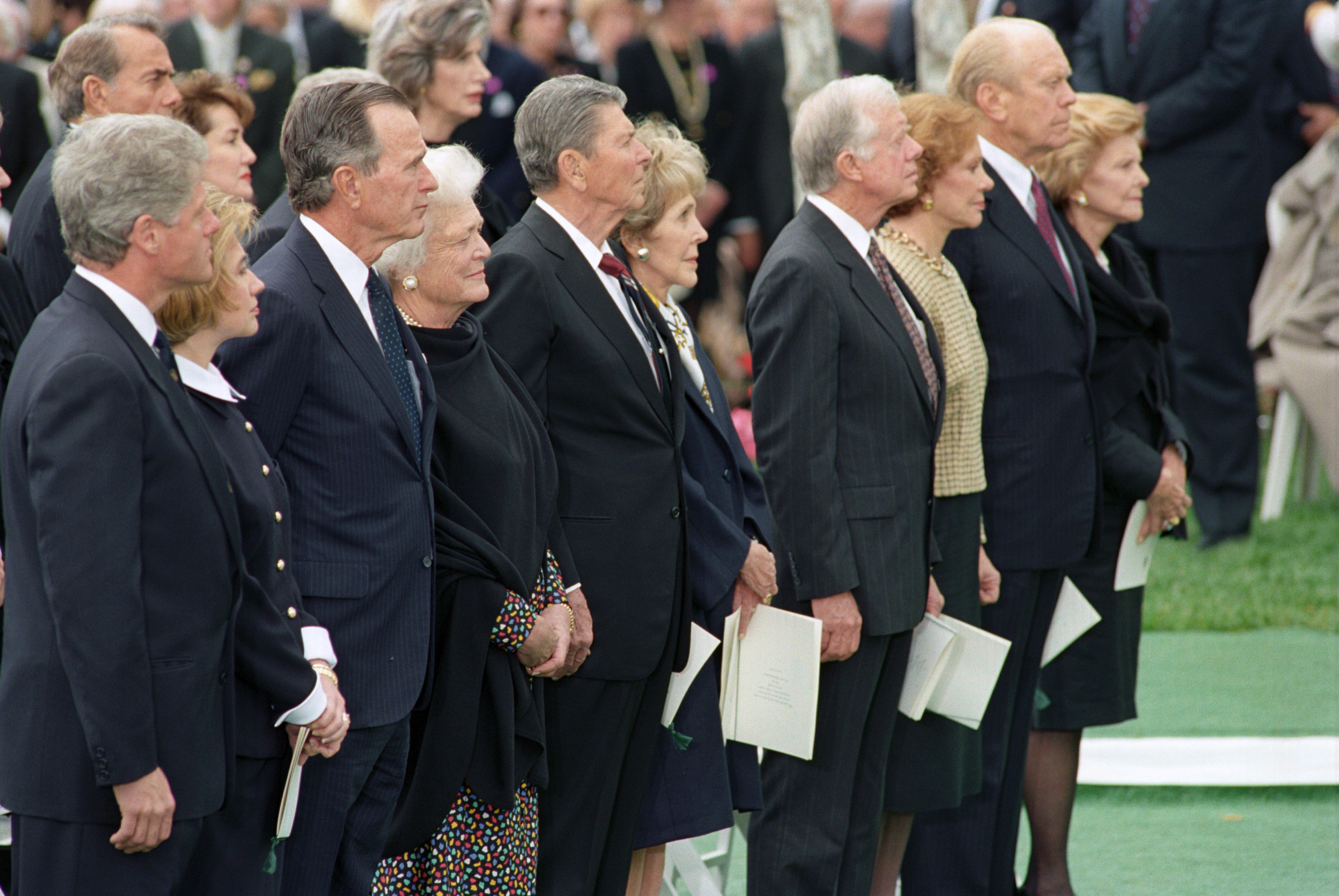
Nixon's funeral on April 27, 1994, was attended by President Bill Clinton and First Lady Hillary Clinton, accompanied by the former presidents (right to left) Gerald Ford, Jimmy Carter, Ronald Reagan and George H. W. Bush, with Betty Ford, Rosalynn Carter, Nancy Reagan and Barbara Bush respectively. As of 2026, all of these former presidents and first ladies (except for Bill and Hillary Clinton) have died.

Carried by eight military pallbearers representing all branches of the United States military, Nixon's body was placed in the library lobby and lay in repose from the afternoon of Tuesday, April 26 to the afternoon of Wednesday, April 27. Despite severe rain, police estimated that roughly 50,000 people waited in lines up to 18 hours to walk past the casket.

=== Funeral service ===
The funeral service was held on Wednesday, April 27, on the grounds of the Nixon Library. The service was attended by over 4,000 people, including family members, President Bill Clinton and his wife Hillary, the former presidents and first ladies George and Barbara Bush, Ronald and Nancy Reagan, Jimmy and Rosalynn Carter, and Gerald and Betty Ford. The former vice president Spiro Agnew, who served with Nixon throughout most of his presidency, also attended along with the former vice president Dan Quayle. The former first ladies Jacqueline Kennedy Onassis and Lady Bird Johnson did not attend due to illness (Onassis died three weeks later from non-Hodgkin lymphoma). A congressional delegation consisting of over one hundred members was present, and a foreign diplomatic corps of over two hundred. Other members of Nixon's administration who attended included Elliot Richardson, James R. Schlesinger, William P. Rogers, James Thomas Lynn, George W. Romney, Alexander Haig, Herbert Stein, and Daniel Patrick Moynihan. Other guests included Nixon's opponent in the 1972 election George McGovern, Charles Colson, who served time in prison due to his part in the Watergate Scandal, Robert Abplanalp, Bebe Rebozo, and California State Assembly Speaker Willie Brown.

International guests included:

- United Nations: Secretary General of the United Nations Boutros Boutros-Ghali
- People's Republic of China: Vice Premier of the People's Republic of China Zou Jiahua
- Russia: Deputy Prime Minister of Russia Alexander Shokhin
- Canada: Minister of Foreign Affairs of Canada Lloyd Axworthy
- United Kingdom: former Prime Minister of the United Kingdom Edward Heath
- France: former Foreign affairs Minister of France Jean-Bernard Raimond
- Japan: former Prime Minister of Japan Toshiki Kaifu
- Israel: former President of Israel Chaim Herzog

The service was officiated by the Reverend Billy Graham, a friend of Richard Nixon's, who called him "one of the most misunderstood men, and I think he was one of the greatest men of the century." Eulogies were delivered by Graham, Henry Kissinger, Senator Bob Dole, California Governor Pete Wilson and President Clinton. Dole could not hold back his tears at the end of his speech.

Following the service, Nixon was buried beside his wife; Pat had died on June 22, 1993. They are buried only steps away from Richard Nixon's birthplace and boyhood home.

Nixon's funeral was also Reagan's last major public appearance; his diagnosis of Alzheimer's disease was announced later that year. Reagan would become the next former president to die, ten years later, on June 5, 2004.
