= James U. Cross =

United States Air Force general (1925–2015)

General James U. Cross
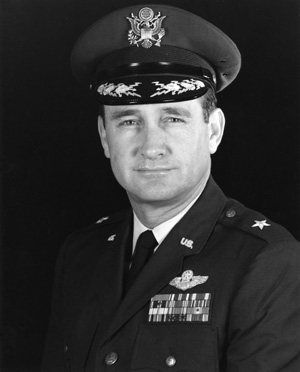
- Born: James Underwood Cross; April 25, 1925; Covington County, Alabama
- Died: July 11, 2015 (aged 90) Gatesville, Texas
- Branch: United States Air Force
- Service years: 1944–1971
- Rank: Brigadier General
- Commands: Pilot of Air Force One, military aide to President Lyndon B. Johnson, commander of the 75th Tactical Reconnaissance Wing at Bergstrom Air Force Base, Texas
- Other work: Author

James Underwood Cross (April 25, 1925 – July 11, 2015) was a United States Air Force brigadier general and author of Around the World with LBJ: My Wild Ride As Air Force One Pilot, White House Aide, and Personal Confidant, with Denise Gamino and Gary Rice. He was a military aide and chief Air Force One pilot under United States president Lyndon B. Johnson.

== Personal life ==
Cross was born in Andalusia, Alabama, on April 25, 1925, to James Kenison Cross and Susie Jesse Wells Cross. He attended Alabama Polytechnic Institute (now Auburn University) for two years before being recalled to active duty in the U.S. Air Force. His wife, Marie Campbell Cross of Austin, Texas died in February 2010 and is buried in Pleasant Home, Alabama, near Andalusia. They had four children together; one child, June Rainwater, died in 2001. Cross died on July 11, 2015, in Gatesville, Texas. Cross will be buried in Alabama next to his wife.

== Professional life ==
General Cross was trained as a pilot by the U.S. Army and was commissioned a second lieutenant in the U.S. Army Air Forces (Note: Even though the source at the US Air Force archive states "Army Air Corps", by 1944 when Cross was commissioned, the AAC had been reorganized and renamed the "US Army Air Forces".) in November, 1944. Cross began his military career flying transport aircraft in World War II. After joining the Air Force Reserve in 1946, he was recalled to active duty in 1948 and served at military bases flying transport aircraft in the Philippines, South Carolina, Newfoundland, and Delaware. Cross was sent to Bolling Air Force Base in Washington D.C. in 1958, where he served as pilot for VIP aircraft. In 1961, he was appointed military aide and pilot to Vice President Lyndon Johnson. Following the assassination of President John F. Kennedy in November 1963, Johnson requested that Cross become qualified to fly the Boeing 707, the 707 being the airframe on which the USAF VC-137 presidential aircraft is based. He served as a co-pilot for one year and then served as Armed Forces Aide and pilot to President Lyndon Johnson from 1965 to 1968.

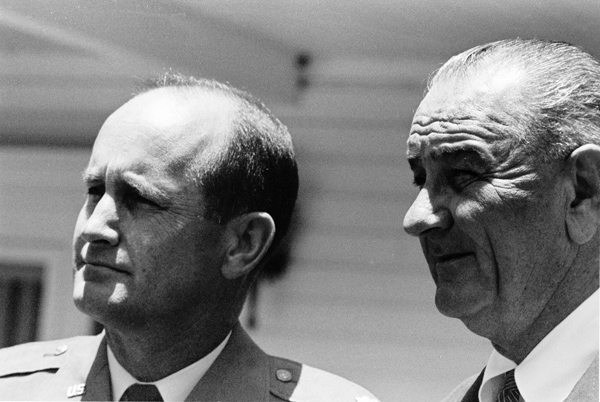
Major James Cross and President Lyndon B. Johnson on the front lawn of the LBJ Ranch near Stonewall, Texas

In August 2010, Cross arranged for one of the C-140 Lockheed JetStar planes formerly used to transport President Johnson from the White House to his Texas ranch to be loaned from the National Museum of the United States Air Force, refinished and relocated to the Lyndon B. Johnson National Historical Park in honor of what would have been Johnson's 102nd birthday.

On February 23, 1962, Cross flew Vice President Lyndon Johnson, then-Chairman of the National Space Council, to Grand Turk Island, where Lieutenant Colonel John Glenn Jr., USMC had splashed down in Friendship 7 after completing the Project Mercury space expedition. Colonel Glenn joined Cross in the cockpit on the flight back to Patrick Air Force Base, Florida.

General Cross' military decorations include the Legion of Merit, the Distinguished Flying Cross (United States), Air Medal, Air Force Outstanding Unit Award with oak leaf cluster, and the Presidential Service Badge.
