= Boeing C-137 Stratoliner =

VIP transport aircraft derived from the Boeing 707

C-137 Stratoliner C-18
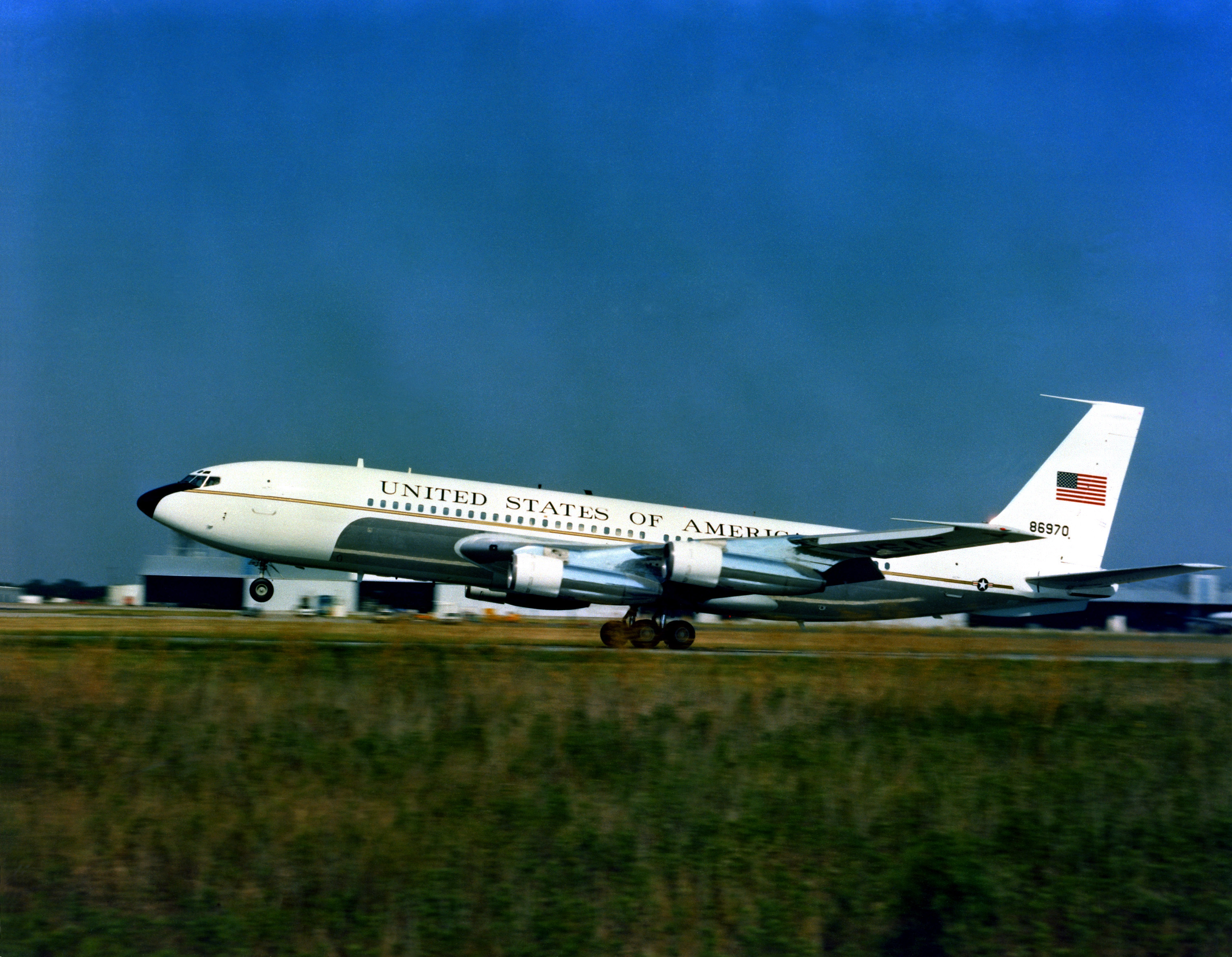
- A VC-137B Stratoliner aircraft taking off in 1981

General information
- Type: Passenger/VIP transport
- National origin: United States
- Manufacturer: Boeing
- Status: Retired
- Primary user: United States Air Force

History
- Manufactured: 1954–1965
- First flight: 31 December 1958
- Developed from: Boeing 707
- Variants: Boeing CC-137; VC-137C SAM 26000; VC-137C SAM 27000

The Boeing C-137 Stratoliner is a retired VIP transport aircraft derived from the Boeing 707 jet airliner used by the United States Air Force. Other nations also bought both new and used 707s for military service, primarily as VIP or tanker transports. In addition, the 707 served as the basis for several specialized versions, such as the E-3 Sentry AWACS aircraft. The designation C-18 covers several later variants based on the 707-320B/C series. The C-137 should not be confused with the similar Boeing C-135 Stratolifter; although they share a common ancestor the two aircraft have different fuselages, among other structural differences.

== Development ==
US Air Force procurement of the Boeing 707 was very limited, amounting to three Model 707-153s designated VC-137A. When delivered in 1959 these had four 13,500 lb (6,100 kg) dry thrust Pratt & Whitney J57 (JT3C6) turbojets; when subsequently re-engined with 18,000 lbf (80 kN) dry thrust TF33-P-5 (JT3D) turbofans they were redesignated VC-137B. Only one other variant served with the Air Force: this was the VC-137C Air Force One Presidential transport, the two examples of which were Model 707-320B Intercontinentals with specialized interior furnishings and advanced communications equipment. Two further C-137C aircraft lacking Presidential transport modifications were later added.

To supplement its VC-137s, the USAF converted several C-135 airframes to VC-135 VIP standard, and these were used for staff transport mainly within the United States.

== Variants ==
=== C-18 ===
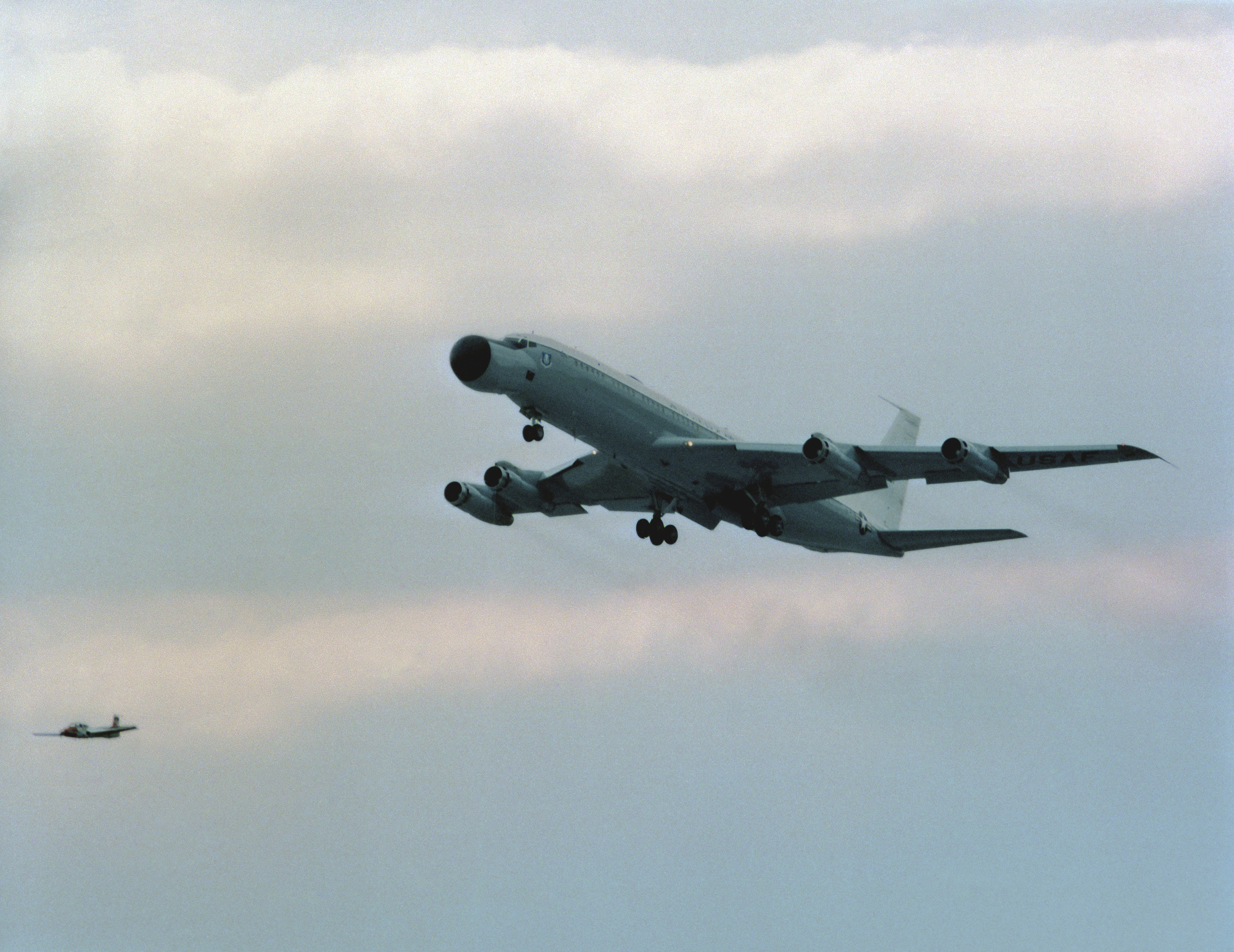
An EC-18B Advanced Range Instrumentation Aircraft (ARIA) takes off on its first flight at Wright-Patterson AFB, Ohio, following its conversion from a Boeing 707-320.

The C-18 is the US military designation for the conversions of the 707-320B series.

C-18A
Eight second-hand (former American Airlines) 707-323Cs bought as crew trainers for the EC-18Bs, four later converted to EC-18B, two converted to EC-18D, one to C-18B; one was not taken into service and was used for spares.
C-18B
One C-18A modified with instrumentation and equipment to support the Military Strategic and Tactical Relay System (MILSTAR).
EC-18B
Four C-18As modified alongside examples of the C-135 for Advanced Range Instrumentation Aircraft (ARIA) missions in support of the Apollo space program. The designation E-7 was originally applied to modified Boeing 707s before being replaced by the EC-18 designation.
EC-18C
Original designation for two prototype J-STAR aircraft, later redesignated E-8A.
EC-18D
Two C-18As modified as a Cruise Missile Mission Control Aircraft (CMMCA).
TC-18E
Two second-hand (former Trans World Airlines) 707-331 aircraft modified for E-3 pilot and crew training.
TC-18F
Two second-hand (former TAP Portugal) 707-382 aircraft modified for E-6 pilot training.

=== C-137 Stratoliner ===
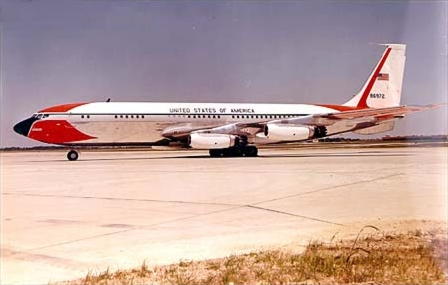
VC-137A 58-6972, pictured in the early 1960s, in its early red livery

VC-137B 58-6970 SAM 970 (Air Force One) is on display at the Museum of Flight, Seattle, WA.

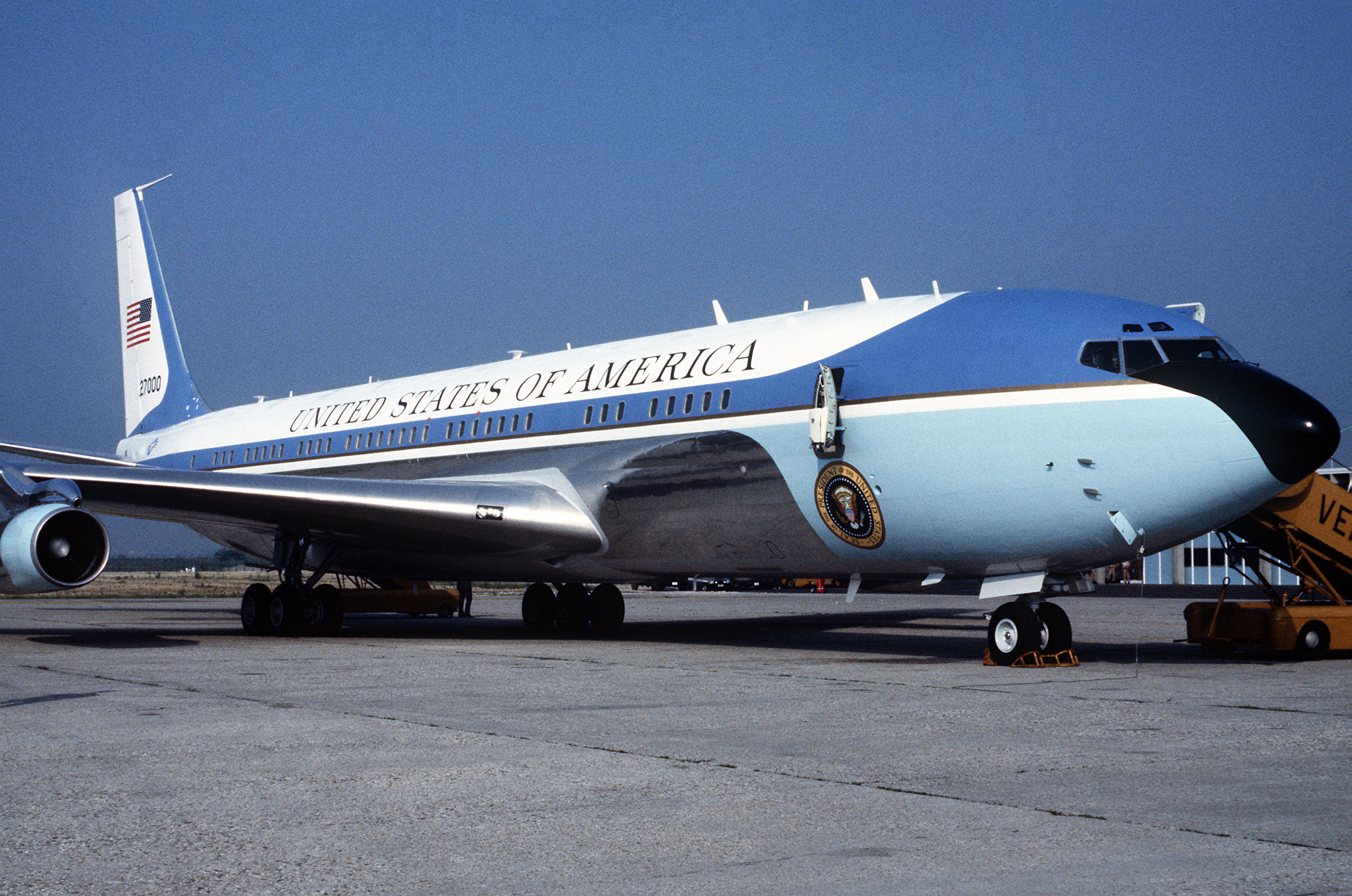
VC-137C SAM 27000 (Air Force One) at Venice Marco Polo Airport, Italy in 1987

The USAF purchased a number of 707s under the C-137 series of designations:

VC-137A
Three 707-153s (58-6970, 58-6971, 58-6972) with four Pratt & Whitney JT3C-6 engines, a 22-passenger VIP interior and provision for use as an airborne command post, re-designated VC-137B.
VC-137B
The three VC-137As re-engined with four Pratt & Whitney JT3D-3 engines in 1963, operated by the 89th Military Airlift Wing, redesignated C-137B.
C-137B
The three VC-137Bs redesignated when downgraded from VIP role.
VC-137C
Two 707-353Bs (62-6000 and 72-7000) were purchased by the USAF (in 1962 and 1972 respectively) for service as presidential transports with call signs SAM 26000 and SAM 27000; later redesignated C-137C.
C-137C
The two VC-137Cs were redesignated when downgraded from presidential use. SAM 26000 and SAM 27000 were retired in 1998 and 2001 respectively. Both are now in aviation museums. Two further C-137Cs were acquired by the USAF on 24 March 1988, one 707-396C (a seized aircraft formerly used for arms smuggling acquired in 1985) and one 707-382B bought second hand in 1987. Their assigned tail numbers were 85-6973 and 85-6974. Tail 85-6973 would later be converted into an E-8C JSTARS.
EC-137D
Two aircraft built as Early Warning and Control System prototypes. Later re-engined and re-designated E-3A. A further second-hand 707-355C aircraft was acquired and configured as an airborne special operations command post.

=== Other US variants ===
Boeing E-3 Sentry
Airborne warning and control system (AWACS) aircraft that provides all-weather surveillance, command, control and communications, to the United States, NATO and other air defense forces. Based on the 707-320B, production ended in 1992 after 68 had been built.
Boeing E-6 Mercury
A version of the 707-320, it operates as an airborne command post and communications center, relaying instructions from the National Command Authority. Its role in relaying to the fleet ballistic missile submarines, known as "Take Charge and Move Out", gives it the suffix TACAMO. Only one version of the E-6 currently exists, the E-6B. The E-6B is an upgraded version of the E-6A that now includes a battlestaff area for the USSTRATCOM Airborne Command Post
Northrop Grumman E-8 Joint STARS
The E-8C Joint Surveillance Target Attack Radar System (Joint STARS) is a USAF airborne battle management and command and control (C2) platform that conducts ground surveillance to develop an understanding of the enemy situation and to support attack operations and targeting that contributes to the delay, disruption and destruction of enemy forces.

=== Variants of other militaries ===
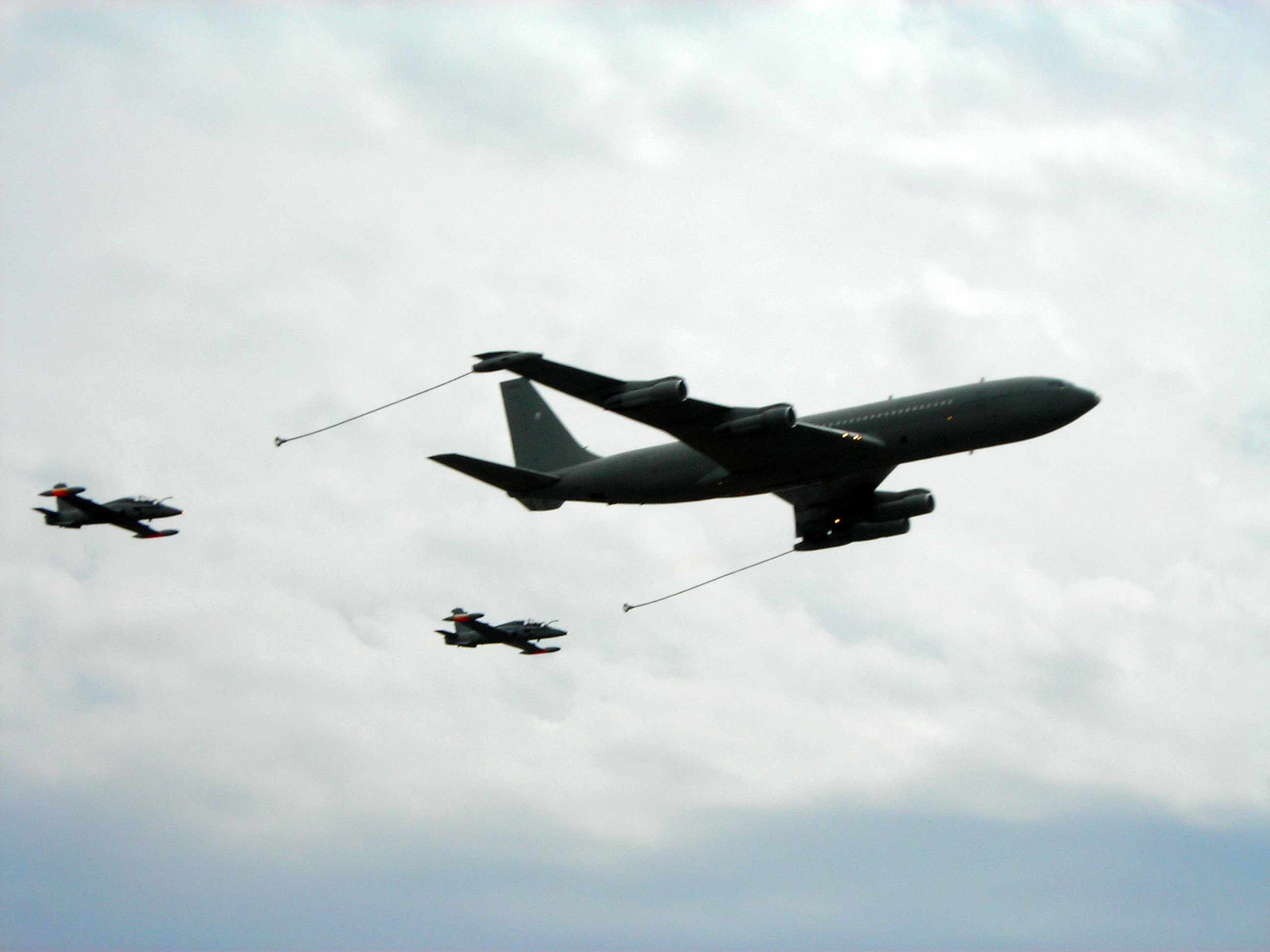
An Italian Air Force Boeing 707T/T refuels two MB-339 in a demonstration

CC-137 Husky
Canadian Forces designation for the 707-347C. Five were purchased new in 1970.
KC-137
Brazilian Air Force (Brazilian Air Force One)
707
IRIAF operates 707 Tankers and Transports.
707 Re’em
The Israeli Air Force operates an undisclosed number (sources suggest 7) of converted Boeing 707s with flying booms in 120 ("Desert Giants") Squadron. Israel's fleet are former civilian aircraft adapted for military uses such as aerial refueling of fighter jets and transport. Able to carry 20 extra fuel tanks while modified for aerial refueling, the Re’ems can be adapted to carry passengers as well as cargo such as military equipment and ammunition. Following the outbreak of the COVID-19 pandemic in 2020, the planes have also been used to carry medical equipment.
707T/T
The 707 Tanker/Transport. Italy purchased and converted four 707s, two to tankers and two to a straight freighter. No 707 tankers remain operational as of 3 April 2008. Also, Omega Aerial Refueling Services operates K707 tankers for lease.
KE-3A
The Royal Saudi Air Force purchased eight E-3 airframes configured as aerial refueling tankers.
Condor
Airborne Early Warning, Command and Control (AEWC&C) aircraft developed in conjunction with Israel Aircraft Industries (IAI) using a former Lan Chile aircraft.

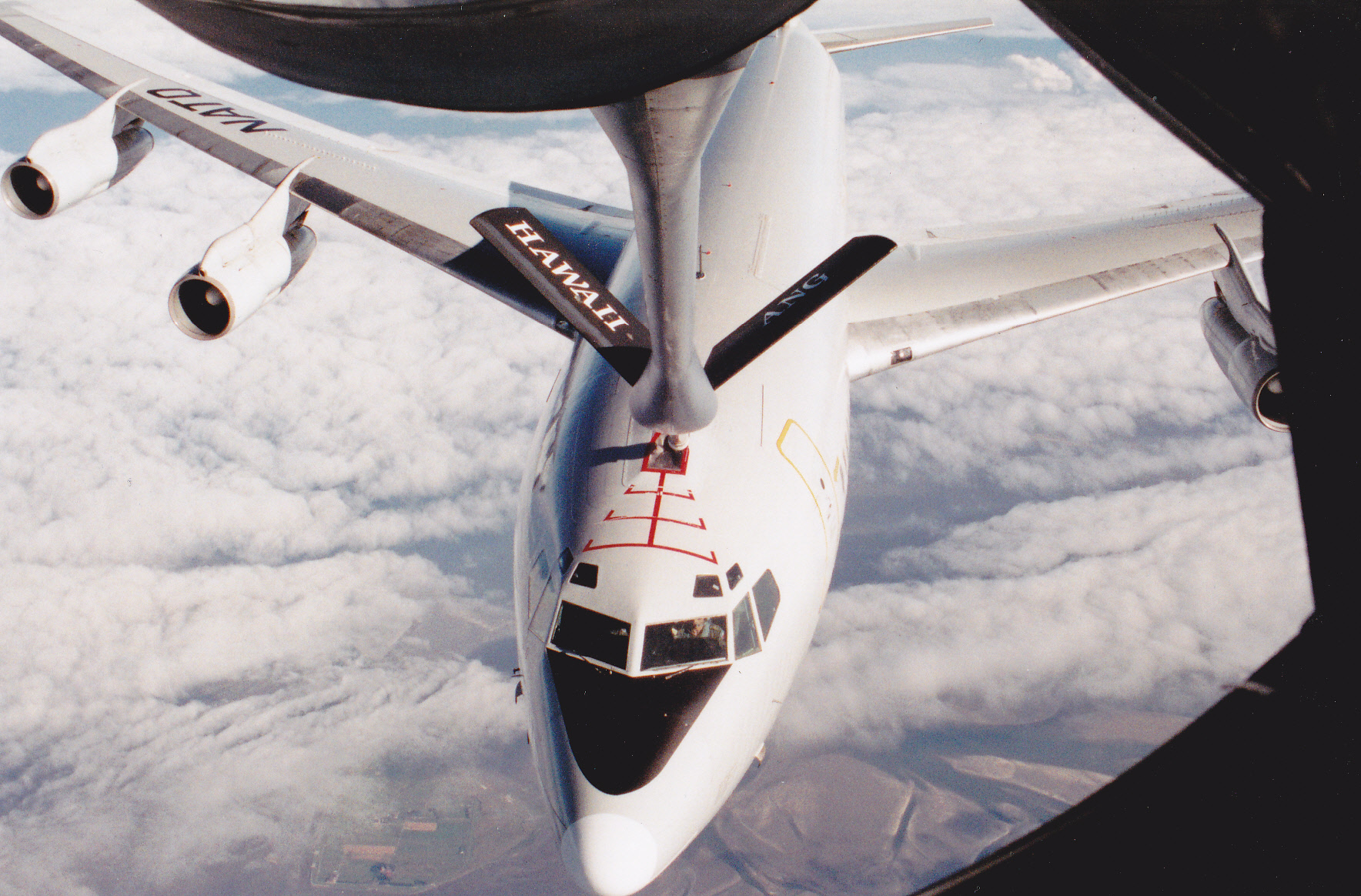
Hooking up for simulated refuelling with a NATO Boeing 707-TCA from a HI ANG KC-135R during a refuelling training mission from Geilenkirchen AB in September 1996

CT-49A/707TCA
Three ex-Sabena airliners converted to TCA (Trainer Cargo Aircraft) in 1989 to support the NATO NAEWF E-3A training and air transport/cargo based on Boeing 707-320B. The aircraft were capable of making dry hookups with the USAF Flying Boom air-to-air refuelling system for training of pilots that were new to NAEWF, but also served as cargo/passenger transport. The two oldest/highest time 707s were replaced by two former Luftwaffe 707s in 1999. NAEWF withdrew the TCAs in 2011.

== Operators ==
Brazil

- Brazilian Air Force

Iran

- Islamic Republic of Iran Air Force

Spain

- Spanish Air Force

United States

- United States Air Force

== Aircraft on display ==
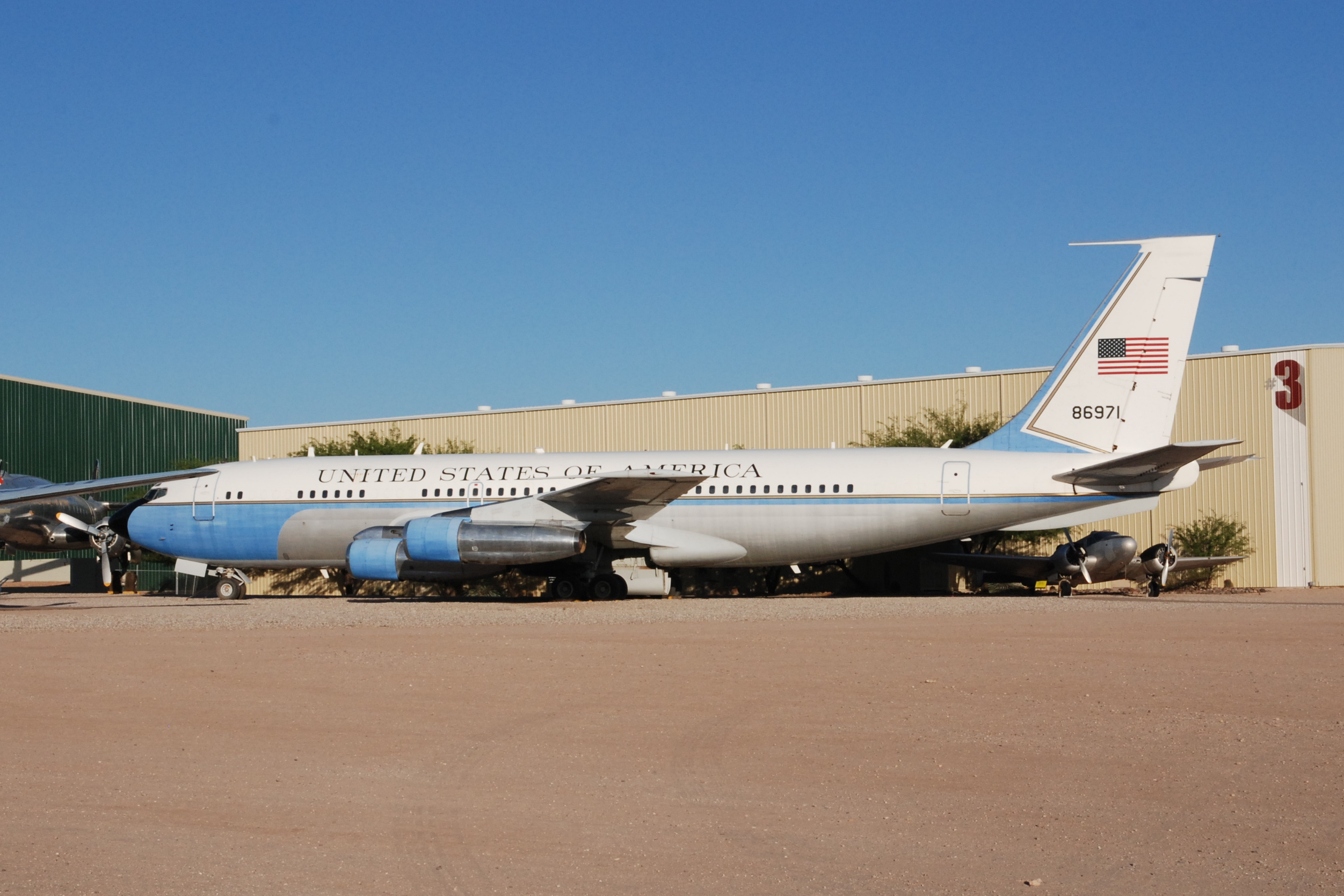
58-6971 on display

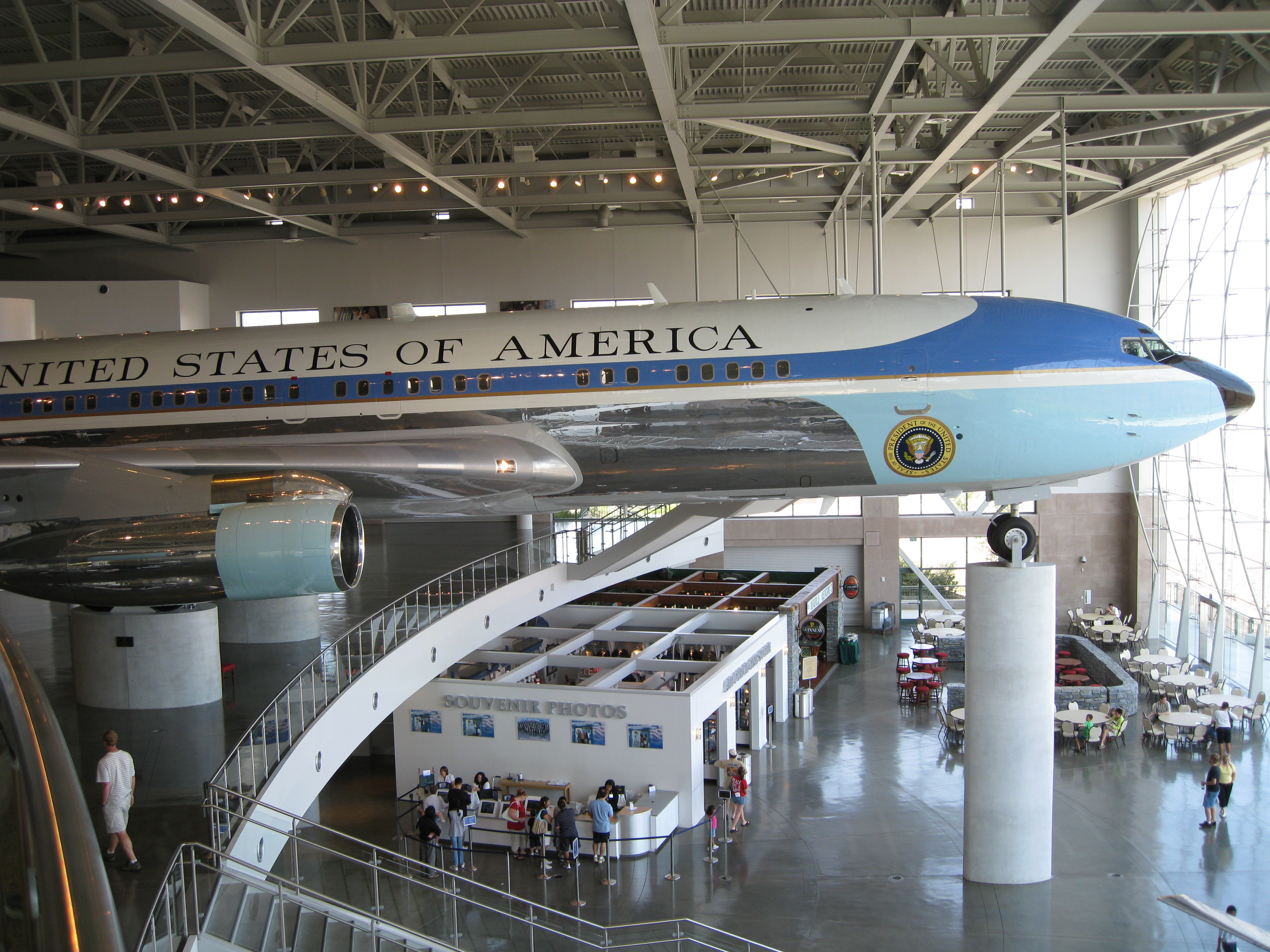
SAM 27000 on display at the Reagan Library

External videos
- Air Force One - SAM 970 - Boeing VC-137B (Boeing 707) walk-through at Seattle's Museum of Flight

The following aircraft are on public display:

- 58-6970 Model 707-120 VC-137B SAM 970, a former Air Force One, formerly known as "Queenie", is on display at the Museum of Flight, Seattle, WA.
- 58-6971 Model 707-153 VC-137B is on display at the Pima Air and Space Museum adjacent to Davis-Monthan AFB in Tucson, AZ. This aircraft became known as "Freedom One" after serving in the return of the American hostages from Tehran, Iran in 1981.
- 62-6000 Model 707-320B (VC-137C SAM 26000), a former Air Force One aircraft, is on display at the National Museum of the United States Air Force at Wright-Patterson AFB near Dayton, Ohio.
- 72-7000 Model 707-353B (VC-137C SAM 27000), a former Air Force One aircraft, is on display at the Ronald Reagan Presidential Library in Simi Valley, California.

== Specifications (VC-137C) ==
side view

General characteristics

- Length: 152 ft 11 in (46.61 m)
- Wingspan: 145 ft 9 in (44.42 m)
- Height: 42 ft 5 in (12.93 m)
- Wing area: 3,010 sq ft (279.63 m^{2})
- Empty weight: 98,466 lb (44,663 kg)
- Gross weight: 297,000 lb (135,000 kg)
- Max takeoff weight: 327,000 lb (148,325 kg)
- Powerplant: 4 × Pratt & Whitney TF33-PW-102 turbofan engines , 18,000 lbf (80 kN) thrust each

Performance

- Maximum speed: 627 mph (1,009 km/h, 545 kn)
- Cruise speed: 600 mph (966 km/h, 520 kn)
- Range: 7,610 mi (12,247 km, 6,610 nmi)
- Service ceiling: 50,000 ft (15,200 m)
- Rate of climb: 4,900 ft/min (25 m/s)

== See also ==
Related development

- VC-137C SAM 26000
- VC-137C SAM 27000
- Boeing 707
- Boeing C-135 Stratolifter
- Boeing KC-135 Stratotanker
- Boeing CC-137
- Boeing E-3 Sentry
- Boeing E-6 Mercury
- Northrop Grumman E-8 Joint STARS

Aircraft of comparable role, configuration, and era

- Douglas DC-8
- Convair 880
