= Missing Man =

Missing Man or missing man can mean:

- Missing Man, a superhero created by Steve Ditko
- Missing man formation, a flypast or similar salute to a fallen comrade
