= Carl F. Karst =

Carl Frederick Karst
- Born: October 27, 1930; Galatia, Kansas, U.S.
- Died: November 16, 1968 (aged 38); Vietnam
- Military career
- Allegiance: United States
- Branch: United States Air Force
- Service years: 1954–1968
- Rank: Colonel
- Unit: 21st Tactical Air Support Squadron
- Conflicts: Vietnam War
- Awards: Distinguished Flying Cross; Bronze Star; Purple Heart
- Memorials: Vietnam Veterans Memorial

Col. Carl Frederick Karst (October 27, 1930 – November 16, 1968) was a United States Air Force Colonel who served during the Vietnam War.

== Military career ==
Karst had 14 years of service in the Air Force. He was assigned to the 21st Tactical Air Support Squadron, piloting the O-1 Bird Dog for forward air control missions.

On November 16, 1968, his O-1F Bird Dog was shot down over Vietnam, leading to his initial MIA status. He was declared dead in 1974, with remains recovered later.

He received the Distinguished Flying Cross, Bronze Star, and Purple Heart. His status was changed to killed in action in 1974.

== Burial ==
Karst's remains were returned by Vietnam in 1989 and identified in 1993. On October 22, 1993, he was buried at Arlington National Cemetery in a full military ceremony attended by his widow Ruth Nelson (remarried), family, friends, and U.S. Senator Bob Dole. The event featured a horse-drawn caisson, F-16 missing man formation flyover, 21-gun salute, and "Taps".

== Memorials ==
His name is inscribed on the Vietnam Veterans Memorial at Panel W39, Line 2, and on the Vietnam Memorial at Kansas State University. A Freedom Tree was planted in his honor at the Russell Memorial Park in 1973.
