= Flypast =

Ceremonial or honorific aircraft flight

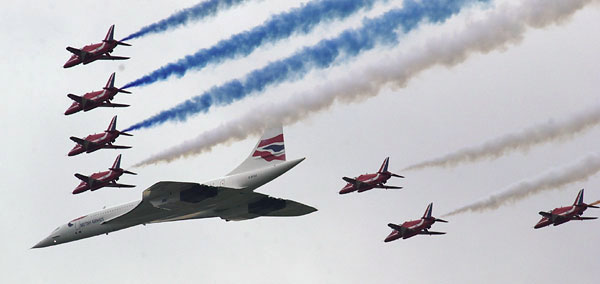
The Red Arrows and Concorde conclude a special flypast over Buckingham Palace, London, on 4 June 2002 celebrating the Queen's Golden Jubilee

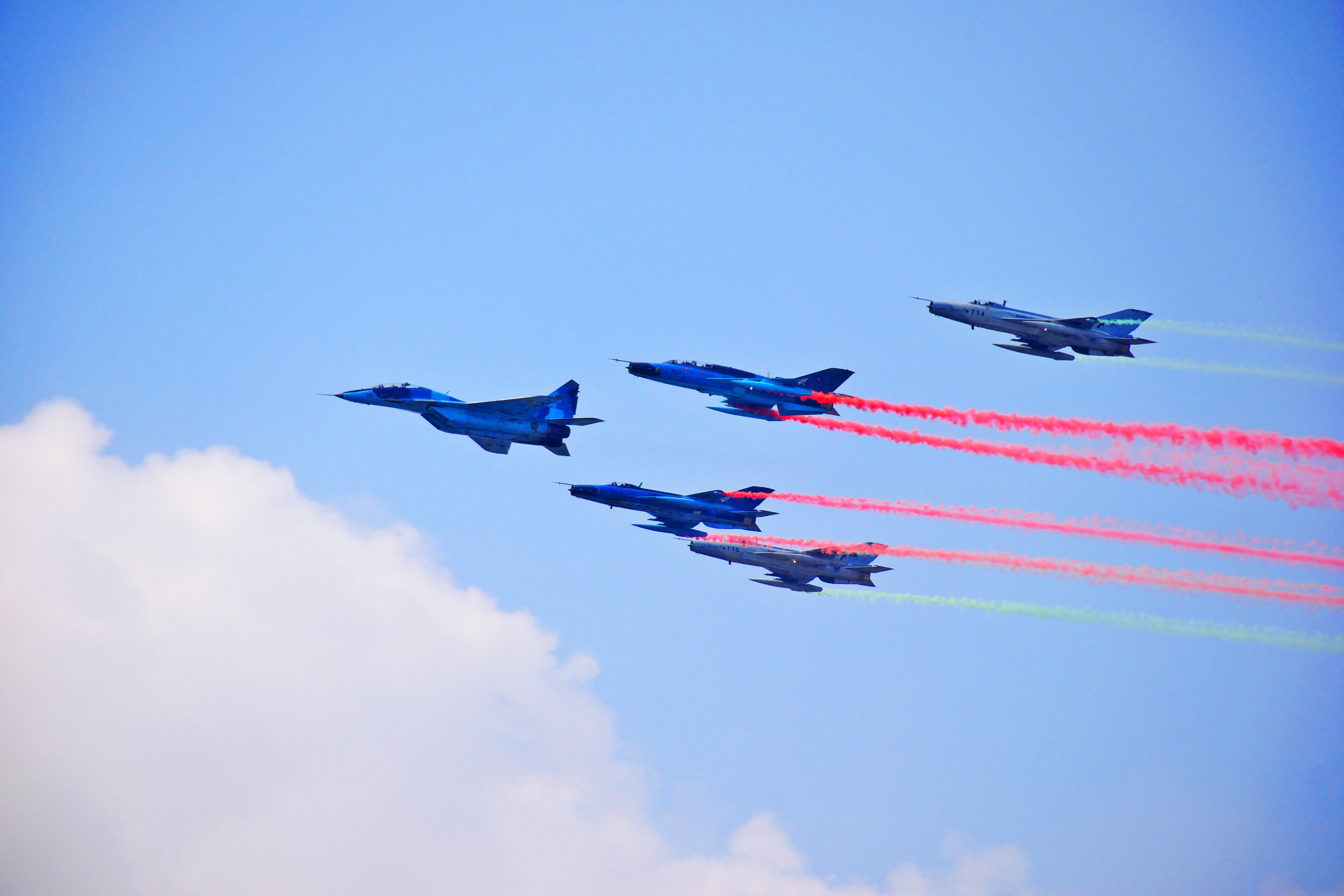
Mikoyan MiG-29 & Chengdu F-7 during Bangladesh Air Force Victory Day Flypast and Aerobatics Show 2016

A flypast is a ceremonial or honorific flight by aircraft. The term flypast is used in the United Kingdom and the Commonwealth. In the United States, the terms flyover and flyby are used.

Flypasts are often tied in with Royal or state events, anniversaries, celebrations, and occasionally funerary or memorial occasions. Flypasts also occur in special situations, to honour someone or to celebrate certain types of aircraft. They are tied to parades, of which they form the aerial component. Often they occur in purely display contexts at airshows, but it is the flypasts linked with civic, ceremonial and national pride, that imprint themselves on a nation's memory. Some flypasts have been described in broadcast and print media as "historic".

Flypasts are regularly featured in public and ceremonial life in the United Kingdom, where they function as a particular kind of aerial salute. They serve to show respect, display aircraft, showcase flying skills and as a form of entertainment to delight the public, for example, during their annual appearance after Trooping the Colour. Flypasts reflect milestones of national life, varying in scope from personal, to community and local, to military, and to national. They may honour individuals in private or public life or commemorate happenings at a particular location. They are also used to honour aircraft. On occasions both small and large they may occur over land or sea, sometimes connected with memorial or thanksgiving services.

In Commonwealth countries—notably Singapore, Canada and Australia—they occur on national days and occasionally on anniversaries. They are seen more rarely in other territories.

== Locations ==
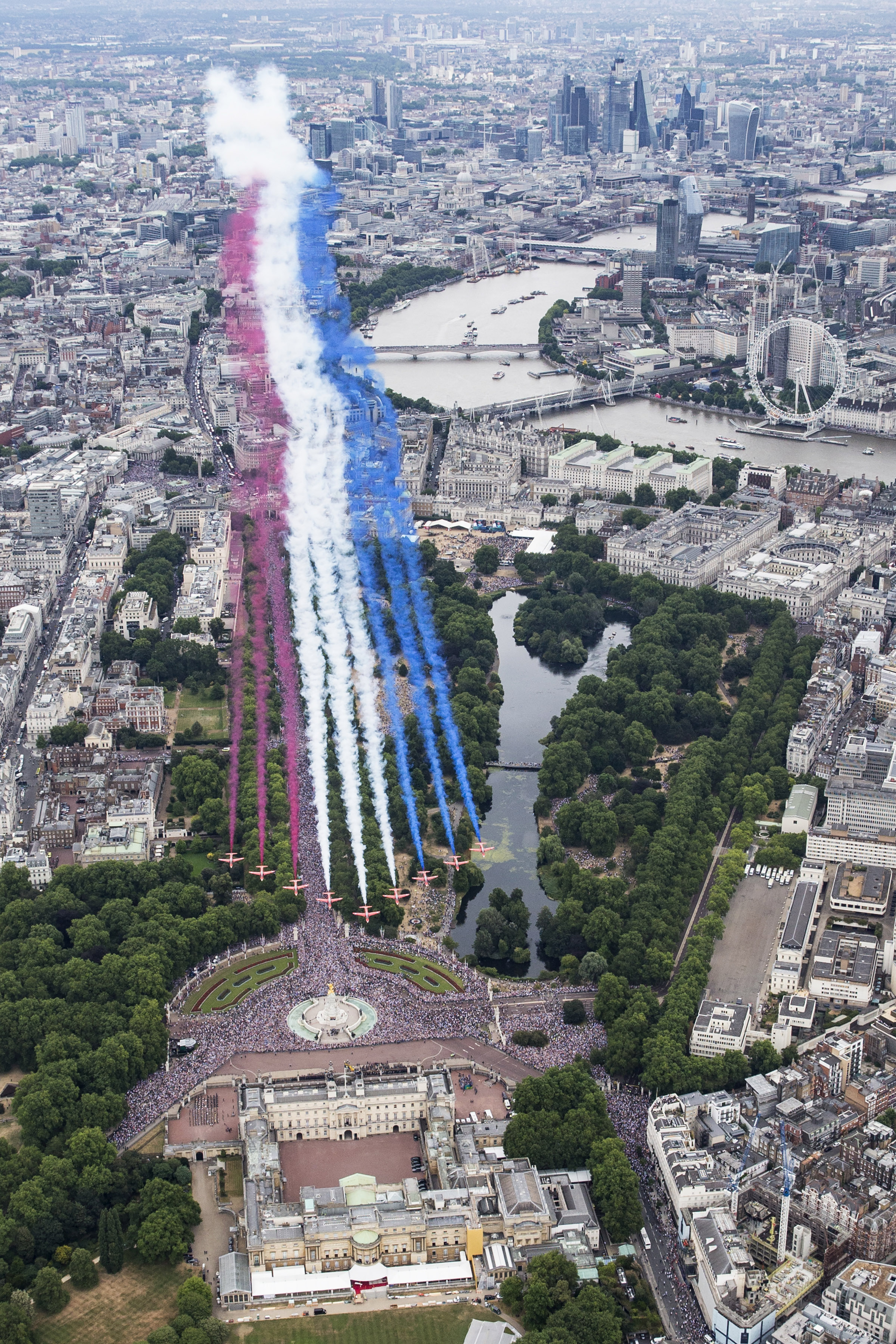
The Red Arrows taking part in the RAF100 parade and flypast over London

Flypast locations are usually of national importance. In the UK, these include Buckingham Palace, where the Royal Family on the balcony will join the thousands of spectators in streets and parks below. Other London settings have included the River Thames. The 50th and 60th anniversaries of World War II were celebrated by flypasts over Normandy in France. Festivities of Trafalgar 200 were centred over Portsmouth and at sea.

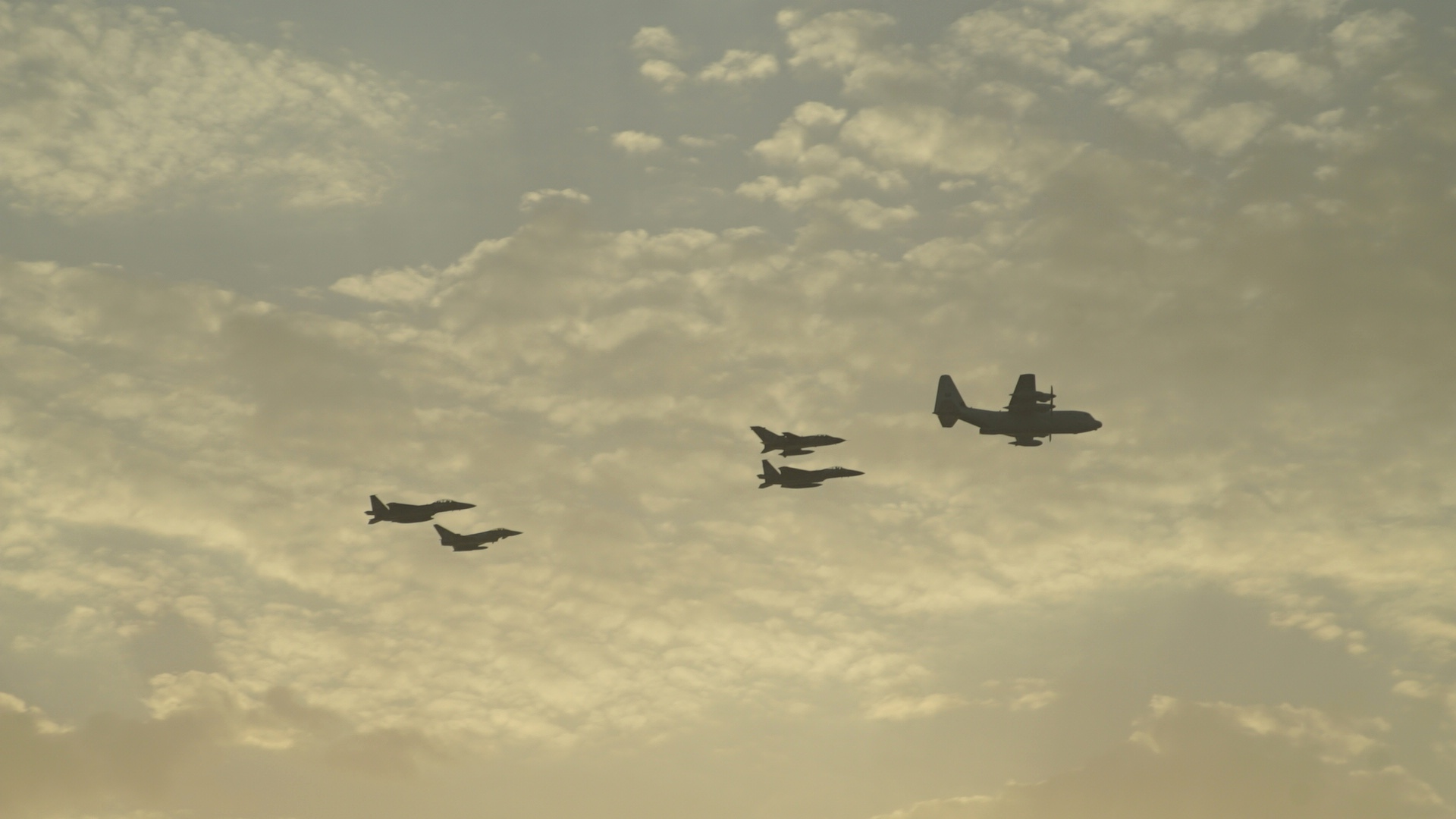
This was during the celebration of the 90th Saudi National Day, seen in the picture is a C-130, F-15s, an F-15C, a Panavia Tornado and a Eurofighter Typhoon

Settings have included the National Stadium, The Float@Marina Bay and the Padang in Singapore; Rajpath in New Delhi, India; Pakistan's Parliament House in Islamabad; Australia's Parliament House and Anzac Parade to the Australian War Memorial, in Canberra; Parliament Hill, Ottawa, Ontario, Canada; and Rizal Park in Manila, Philippines.

== Early flypasts ==
The connection of Trooping the Colour with Royal Air Force flypasts began in 1913 when the Royal Flying Corps Military Wing performed a flypast for King George V on Laffan's Plain, near Aldershot.

On 6 July 1935, George V carried out his Silver Jubilee Review of the Royal Air Force at RAF Duxford and RAF Mildenhall which included 200 aircraft on the ground and a flypast of 350 aircraft.

King George VI attended a flypast at the opening ceremony of the Empire Exhibition, Scotland 1938 at Ibrox Stadium on 5 May 1938, with his consort Queen Elizabeth.

== United Kingdom ==
Flypasts are a regular occurrence in the United Kingdom at national events or commemorations. In 1954 the Queen conducted a Coronation Review of the Royal Air Force at RAF Odiham which included a flypast by about 640 aircraft - among them 440 jet aircraft.

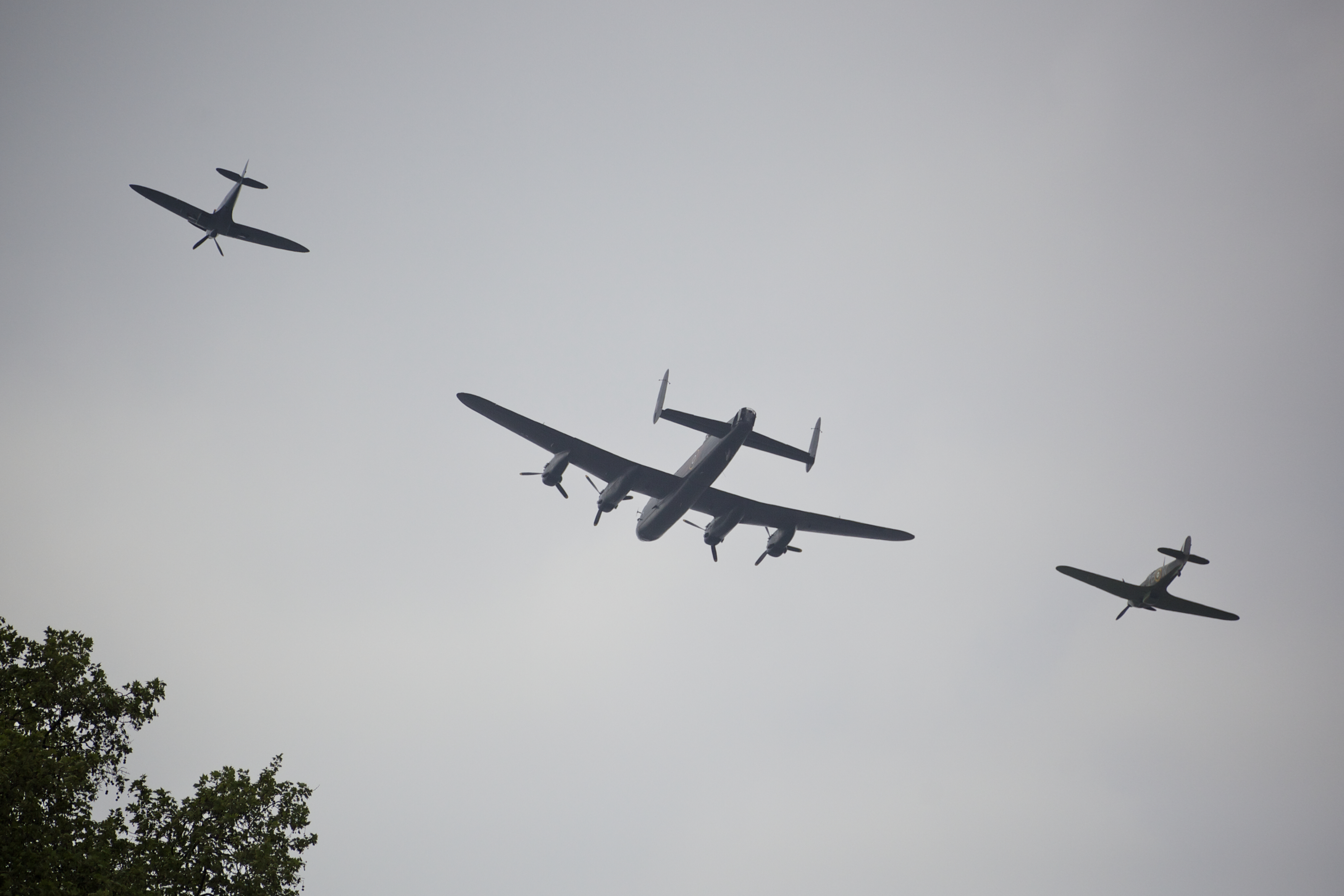
Flypast of an Avro Lancaster, a Supermarine Spitfire and a Hawker Hurricane over Buckingham Palace on 29 April 2011, after the wedding ceremony of Prince William, Duke of Cambridge and Catherine, Duchess of Cambridge

On many occasions, the flypasts are performed by the Red Arrows aerobatic team of the Royal Air Force, but on more important events like Royal occasions, for example the Queen's 80th birthday during 2006, was a flypast following the Trooping the Colour. Headed by the Lancaster with 2 Hurricanes and 2 Spitfires (Battle of Britain Memorial Flight), the 49 aircraft in 9 formations included Typhoons, Jaguars, Tristar, VC10, C-17A Globemaster III and E-3 Sentry. The highlight was a "Diamond 9" formation of Tornado GR4s and the appearance of a Canberra escorted by the Red Arrows.

Historic aircraft of the Battle of Britain Memorial Flight, including Supermarine Spitfires and the Avro Lancaster perform flypasts throughout the year particularly on military anniversaries and occasions and as a mark of respect at funerals and memorial services.

On 31 March 2021 the Red Arrows performed a flypast as part of a series of commemorative events taking place in Australia to mark the centenary celebrations of the Royal Australian Air Force (RAAF).

== National or Republic Day celebrations ==
In many countries, flypasts, normally performed by the precision aerobatic team of a country's air force, are an integral part of Republic Day or National Day celebrations.

On Canada Day 1 July, the Snowbirds of the Royal Canadian Air Force perform a flyby over Parliament Hill in Ottawa. In 2017, this flypast was extended to 39 aircraft to mark Canada's 150th birthday.

The Pakistan Air Force conducts a flypast every year on 23 March to commemorate the Lahore Declaration and the Republic Day of Pakistan which occurred on 23 March 1956. This is done in Islamabad.

In Singapore the National Day Parade on 9 August 2005 celebrated 40 years of independence with an elaborate flypast including two Chinook helicopters flying the national flag past the Esplanade Theatre in Padang.

In Finland, during Independence Day parade on 6 December the Finnish Air Force has traditionally performed a flyover of four fighters at the moment when the honour company of the Air force passes the podium where a representative of the war veterans, a representative of the city and the commander of the military province in question receive the parade troops marching past, the Helicopter battalion of Utti Jaeger Regiment has also performed flyovers timed to happen at the same time when the honour company of the Finnish Army provided by the Utti Jaeger Regiment passes the podium.

In India, Republic Day celebrations on 26 January includes a flypast in Delhi.

In the Philippines, flypasts (also called flybys) by Philippine Air Force are held to celebrate Independence Day on 12 June and Rizal Day on 30 December.

National celebrations
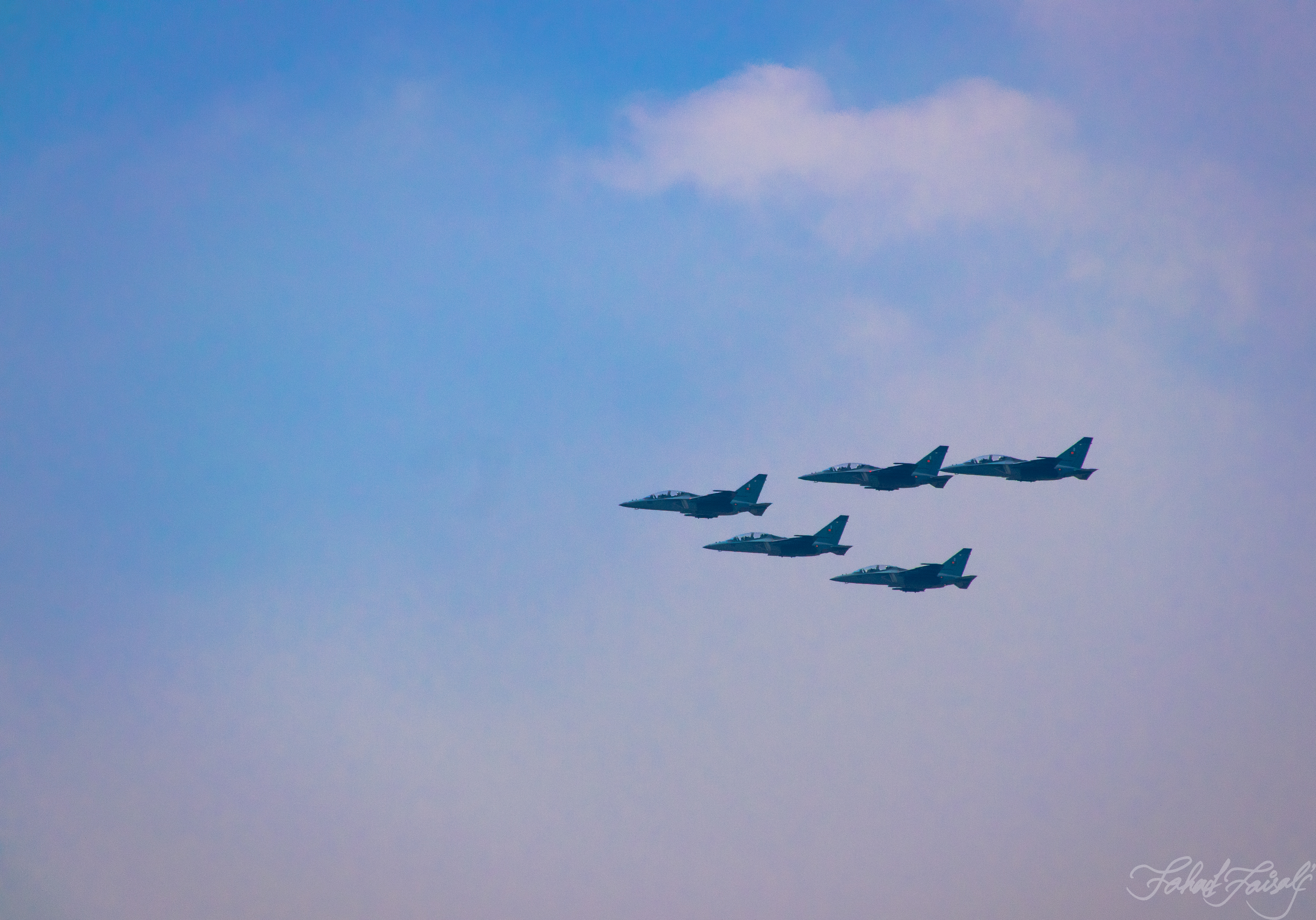
Bangladesh
Yakovlev Yak-130 of Bangladesh Air Force fly over national parade ground during Flypast of Victory day of Bangladesh (2016)

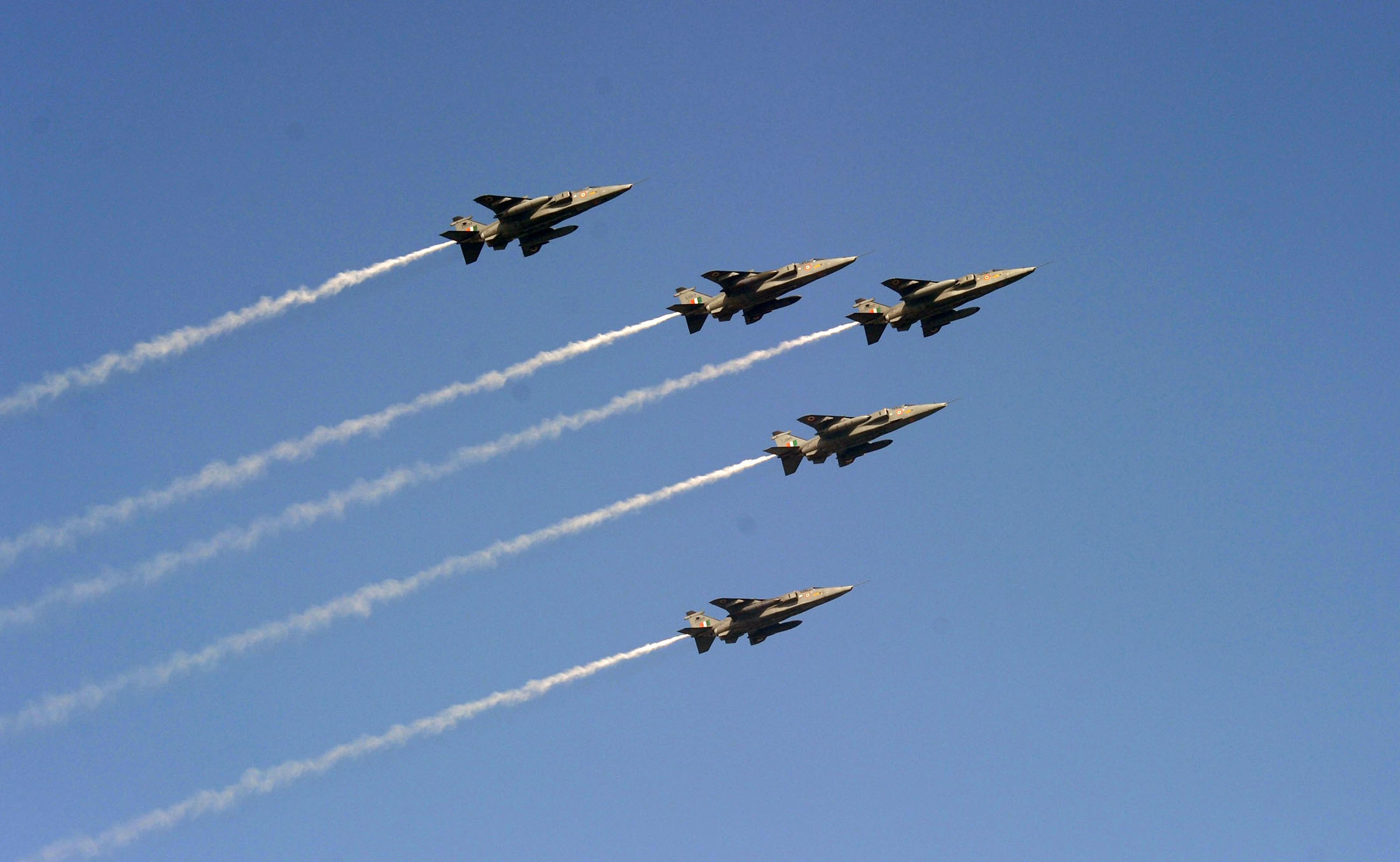
India
Five SEPECAT Jaguars of Indian Air Force in arrow formation fly over Rajpath, on the occasion of the 67th Republic Day Parade, in New Delhi (2016)

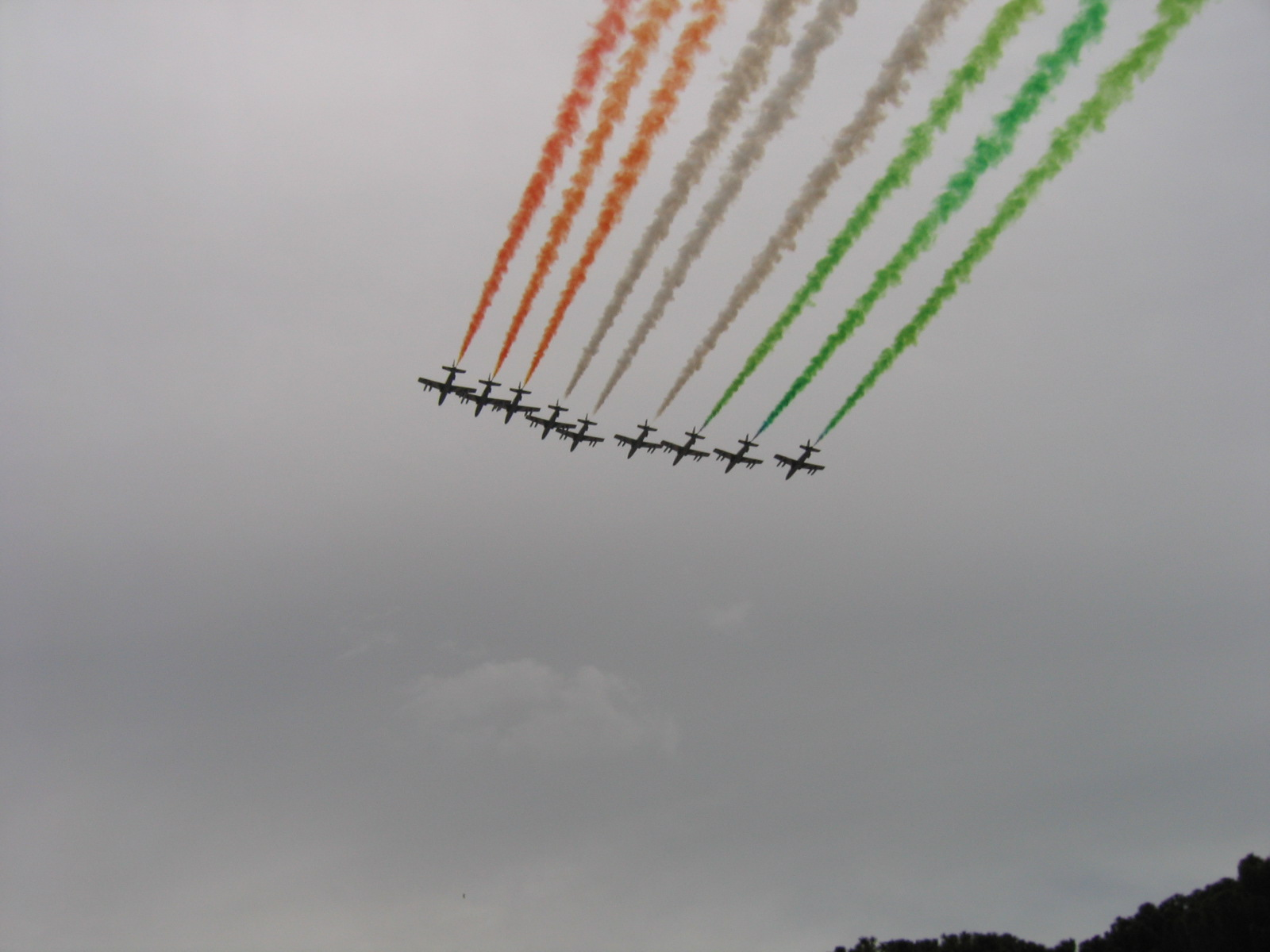
Italy
Frecce Tricolori fly over Rome during Festa della Repubblica (2006)

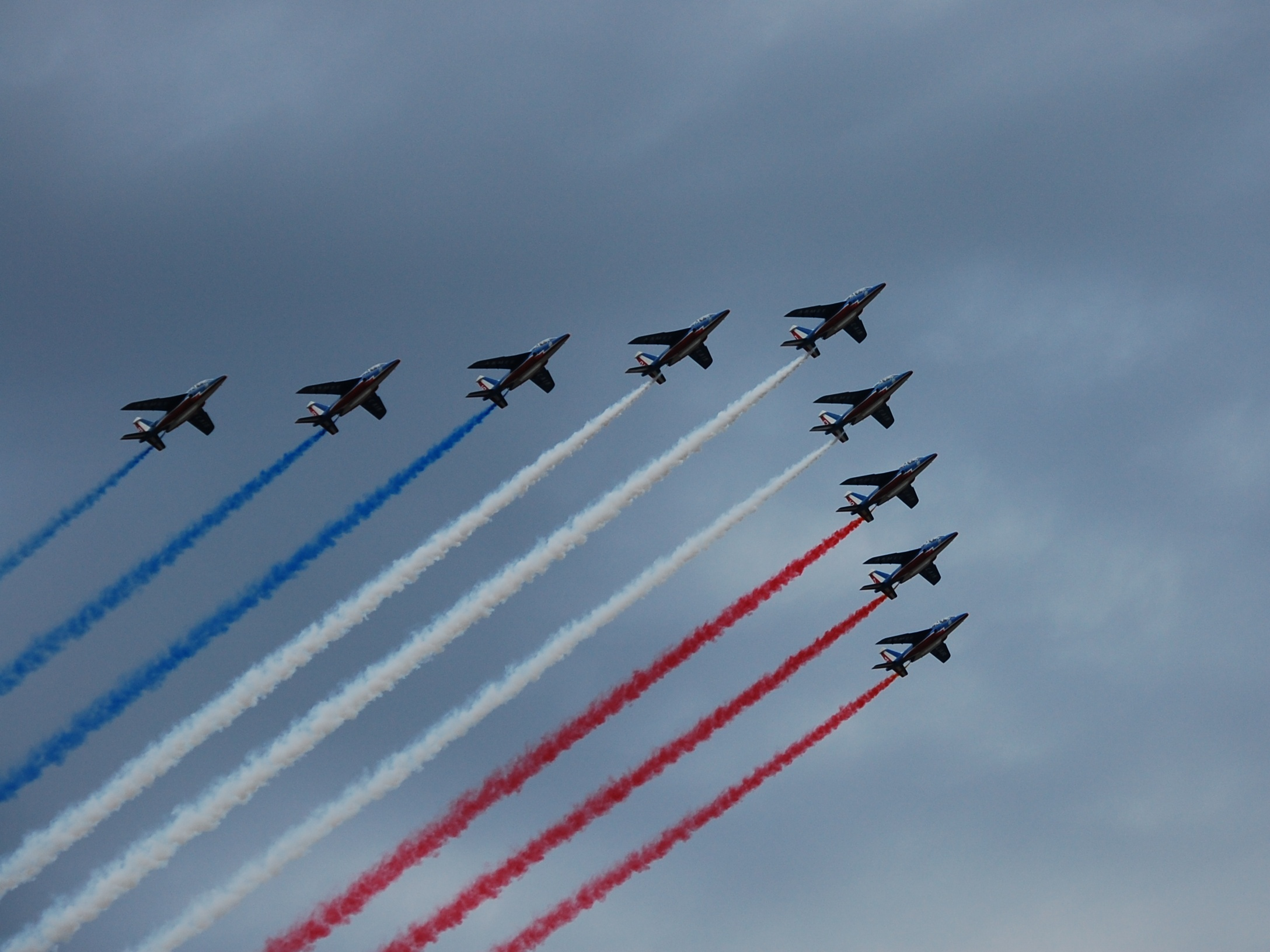
France
The Patrouille de France during the Bastille Day Military Parade (2007)

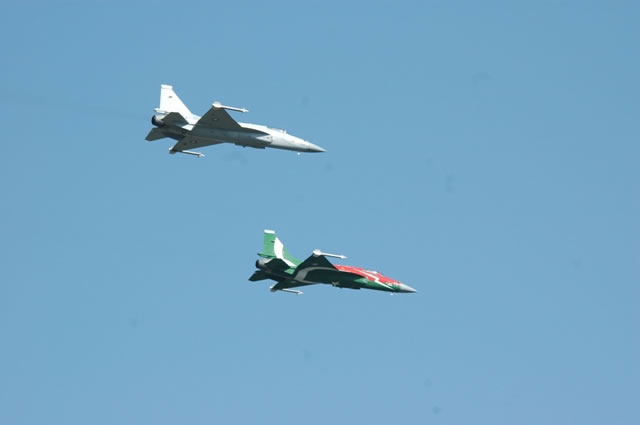
Pakistan
Two Pakistan Air Force JF-17 Thunders during Pakistan Republic Day (2007)

== Air Force anniversaries ==
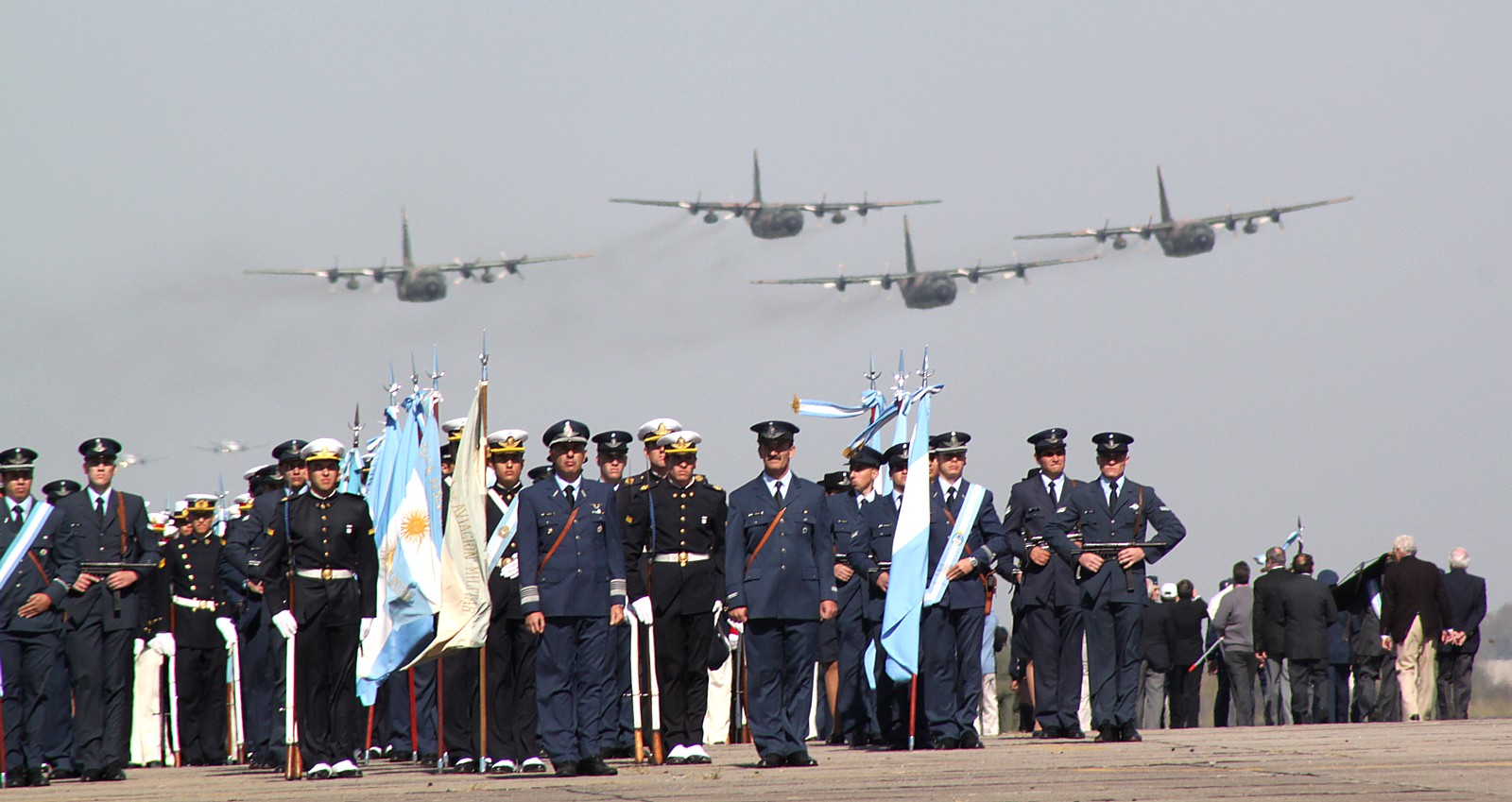
C-130s flypass, Air Fest 2010 show, Moron Air Base, Argentina

During October 2006, the Indian Air Force celebrated its Platinum Jubilee with a flypast of around 78 aircraft, including the Sukhoi 30 MKI, the Mirage 2000, and MiG-25 attack aircraft.

On 1 April 2008, a flypast by the Red Arrows over Central London marked the 90th Anniversary of the founding of the Royal Air Force. The milestone was also celebrated that June following Trooping the Colour 2008 with a flypast of 55 aircraft, and in July with a Royal Review and flypast of 90 aircraft at the Royal International Air Tattoo.

Ten years later, the RAF's centenary was celebrated over The Mall, London and Buckingham Palace on 10 July 2018 with a large-scale flypast featuring the Red Arrows, the Battle of Britain Memorial Flight, and aircraft from several RAF squadrons. This flypast featured 103 aircraft of 24 different types, spread out over twenty different formations. The entire flypast took nine minutes to pass over London, and featured aircraft based from 17 different airfields all over the United Kingdom.

== World War II ==
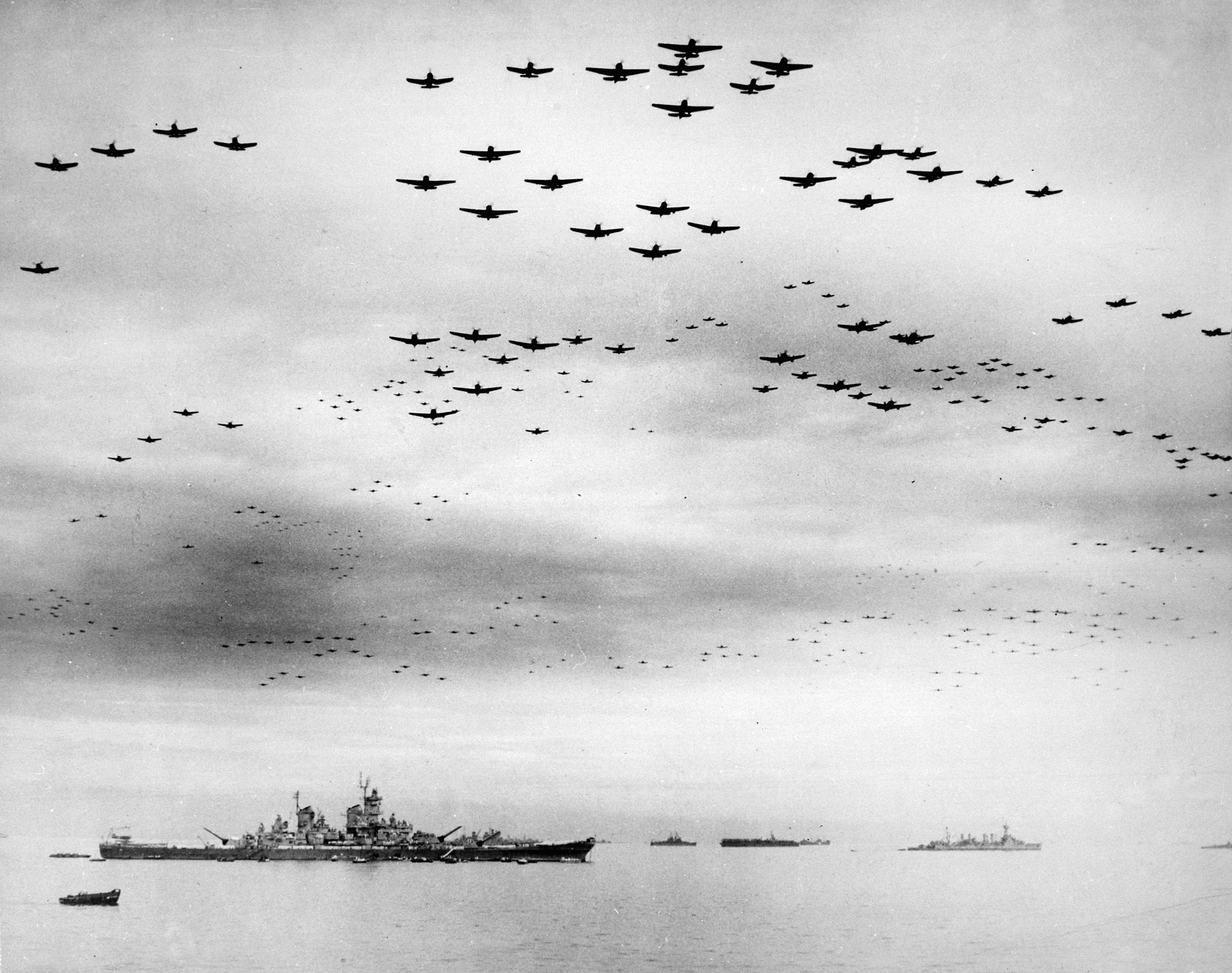
(1945) Formation of American planes over USS Missouri and Tokyo Bay celebrating the signing of the surrender

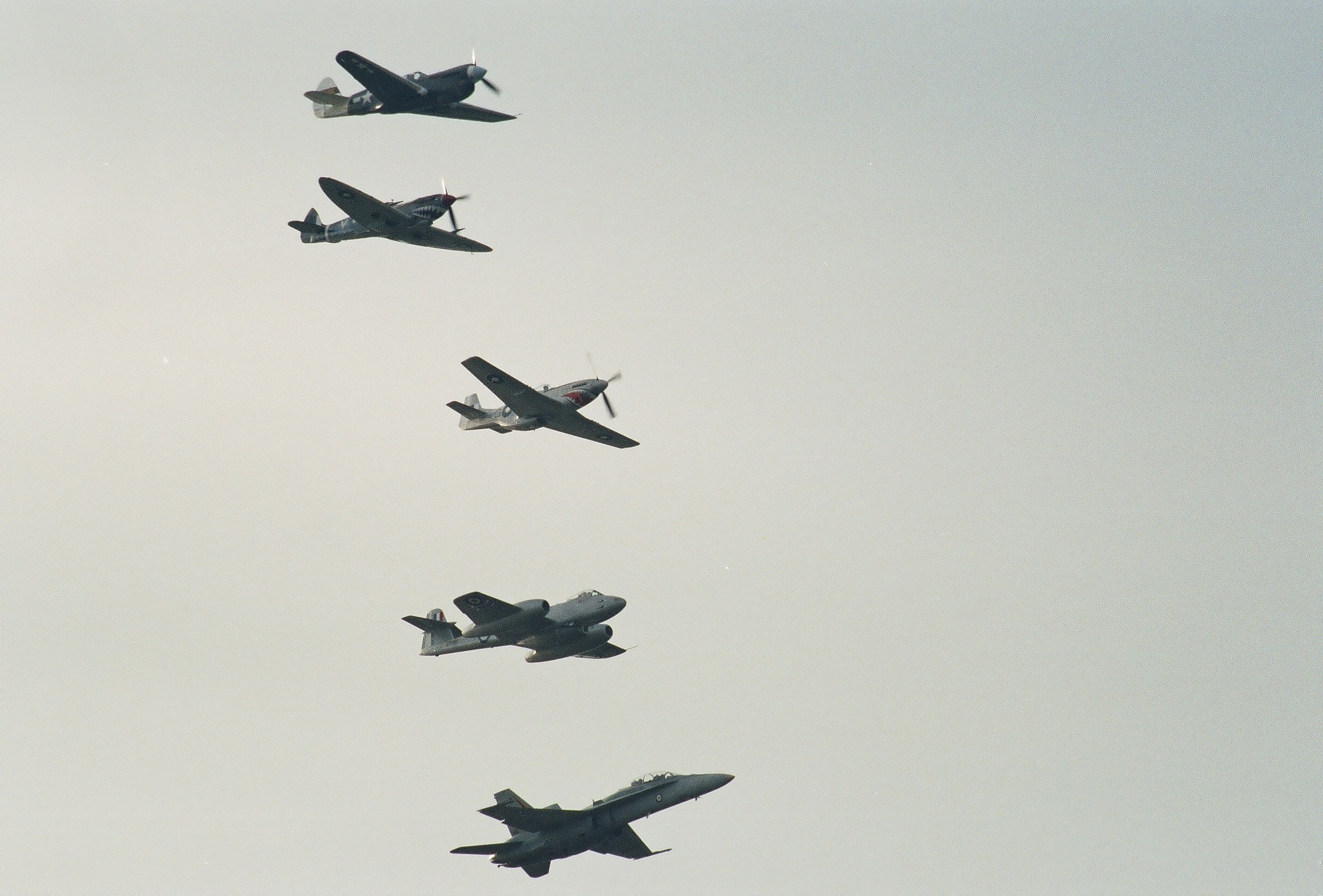
(2005) Five aircraft flying over Canberra for VJ day. Top to bottom: Curtiss P-40 Warhawk, Supermarine Spitfire, North American P-51 Mustang, Gloster Meteor and F-18 Hornet

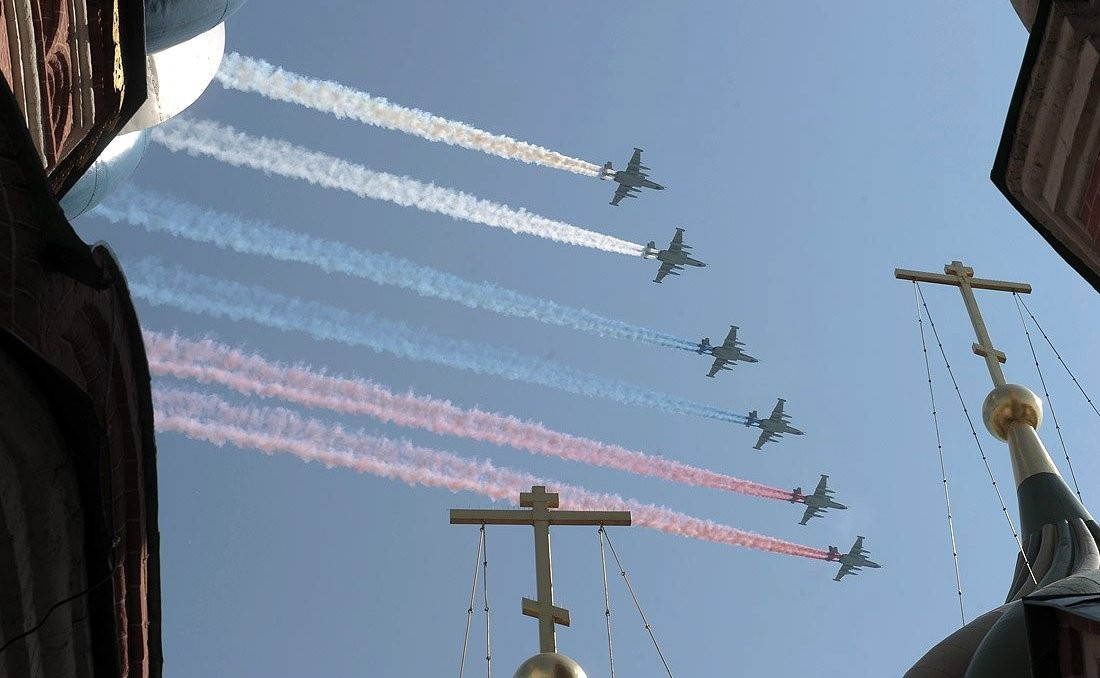
(2010) Russian flag presented by Su-25s during the Victory Day Parade commemorating the 65th anniversary of the defeat of Nazi Germany.

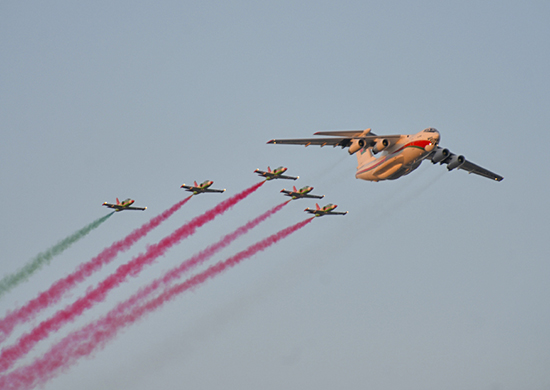
(2019) The colours of the Belarusian flag being interpreted during a flypast of the Belarusian Air Force during the Independence Day Parade in honor of the 75th anniversary of the Liberation of Belarus.

Achievements in World War II were celebrated at the time and continue to be commemorated in flypasts. The Royal Air Force used the upper dams of Ladybower Reservoir to practise for the Dambusters raids and this is occasionally commemorated in flypasts by the Battle of Britain Memorial Flight.

The largest flypast in history occurred on the signing of the Japanese Instrument of Surrender which formally ended the war between Japan and the allied powers in Tokyo Bay on 2 September 1945. 400 B-29 bombers and 3000 carrier aircraft participated.

On 15 September 1945, after the war ended, about 300 aircraft flew over London in the first Battle of Britain anniversary flypast. "The formation was led by 247 Squadron in their new Vampire fighters, the first time the public had seen the aircraft." This flypast was led by Douglas Bader.

An attender recalls a victory parade in London on 8 June 1946 featuring two flypasts, one during the day and one at night. Scores of aircraft, of many kinds, took part.

The 50th and 60th anniversaries of World War II were commemorated with large flypasts. On 15 September 1990, 168 aircraft in seven formations celebrated the 50th Anniversary of the Battle of Britain. Further flypasts occurred on 6 June 1994, celebrating the 50th anniversary of D-Day.

Over the weekend of 19–20 August 1995, the 50th anniversary of VJ Day was marked in London, including "a two-minute silence which...was ended by an Avro Lancaster bomber overflying The Mall and dropping about a million poppies over the site." In the evening, there was a further flypast on the Thames.

6 June 2004 marked the 60th Anniversary of D-day, with the Normandy landings commemorated by veterans (many now aged 80+ years) and political leaders at locations throughout Normandy. The Battle of Britain Memorial Flight scattered millions of poppies over the veterans as they crossed the English Channel by ferry. Later, it flew over the veterans at Arromanches, concluding a memorial service with a 47-aircraft flypast of modern military jets led by the RAF Red Arrows. At Pegasus Bridge, the Army Air Corps conducted a flypast of Lynx helicopters.

On 5 June 2019, a flypast of 24 British Armed Forces aircraft was held over Gosport to mark the 75th Anniversary of D-Day. The flypast was part of a larger series of commemorative events to mark the anniversary, which were by Donald Trump and other world leaders.

On 10 July 2005, the 60th anniversary of VE Day was marked by a flypast of vintage aircraft which again dropped one million poppies on crowds in The Mall.

The 60th anniversary in 2003 of the Dambusters raid was marked by a flypast of the last operational Lancaster over the cliffs at Reculver, site of secret tests of inventor Barnes Wallis's bouncing bomb. (This flight was part of a larger series of flypasts over key locations by the Battle of Britain Memorial Flight.)

On 16 May 2008, Les Munro, the last surviving Squadron Leader, and Richard Todd, star of the celebrated film The Dambusters, attended the 65th Anniversary service and flypast over Ladybower Reservoir. At 100 feet, as compared to 60 feet of the Dambusters' practice runs, a single Lancaster aircraft passed three times over Derwent Water. A Spitfire, two Tornadoes, and a Dakota transport plane also participated.

In 2003, the Royal Australian Air Force commemorated Anzac Day with a flypast of four aircraft - Harvard and Winjeel - over the Cenotaph in Ballarat, Victoria.

The Royal Canadian Air Force at the Canada Aviation Museum in Ottawa honoured Canada's participation and commemorated the 60th anniversary of the Battle of Britain on 17 September 2006. Modern aircraft performed a flypast along with four World War II planes provided by Vintage Wings of Canada who made a "once-in-a-lifetime formation".

To mark the 70th Anniversary of VE Day, a flypast of 56 historical aircraft was performed over the National Mall in Washington, D.C., on 8 May 2015. This flypast was a rare sight for residents, as it was the first time in several years that the restricted airspace over Washington was opened for the occasion.

On 24 September 2020, a similar flypast is set to take place over the National Mall in Washington, D.C., to mark the 75th Anniversary of the end of the war. This flypast is expected to include nearly 100 vintage aircraft spread across 24 formations. Aircraft expected to take part include the Curtiss P-40 Warhawk, Bell P-39 Airacobra, Vought F4U Corsair, North American B-25 Mitchell, Boeing B-17 Flying Fortress, Douglas C-47 Skytrain, Avro Lancaster, Supermarine Spitfire, and Hawker Hurricane. In London, a flypast consisting of the Red Arrows and Battle of Britain Memorial Flight was to be held on 8 May, but was subsequently cancelled due to the COVID-19 pandemic.

== Spaceflight ==
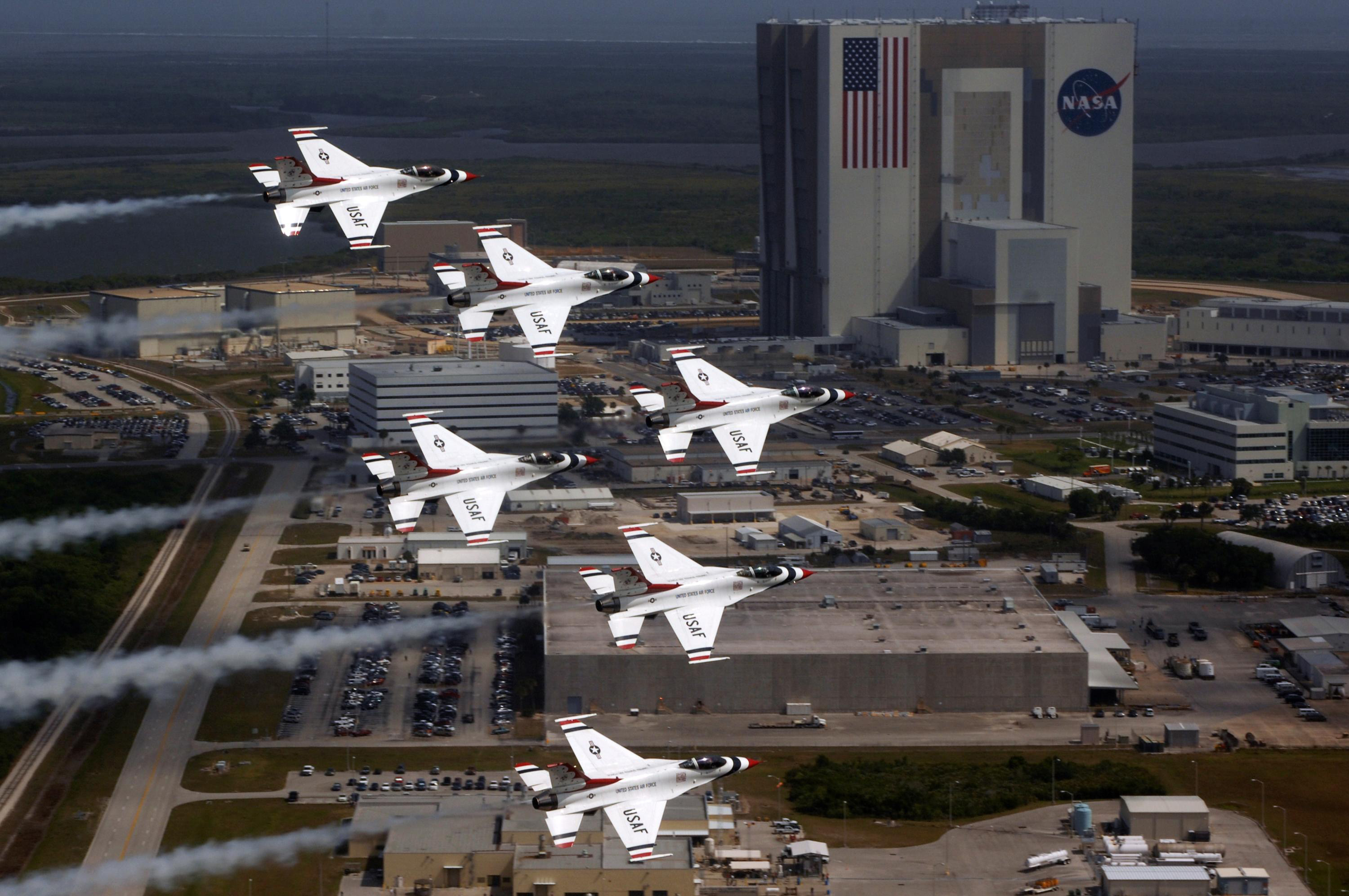
US Air Force Thunderbird F16 jets fly over the Vehicle Assembly Building at the Kennedy Space Center in July 2007.

On 7 May 2007, hundreds of workers at Kennedy Space Center watched as US Air Force Thunderbirds performed a series of passes over the main industrial area, where the Space Shuttle is maintained and prepared for launches. The purpose of this demonstration was to photograph the planes at KSC for promotional purposes. Almost six months later, in November 2007, the Kennedy Space Center hosted the inaugural World Space Expo. The opening featured an aerial salute to NASA with the Thunderbirds as the main attraction.

== Sports ==
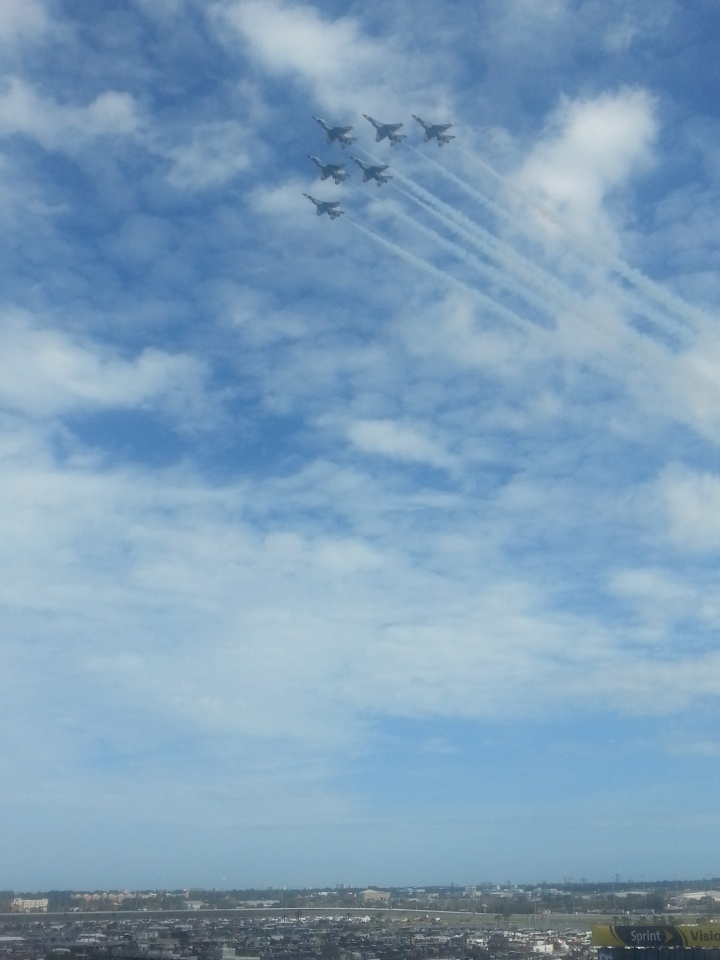
A flyover with six F-16 Fighting Falcons (US Air Force Thunderbird) in "Delta" formation prior to the Daytona 500, 2016

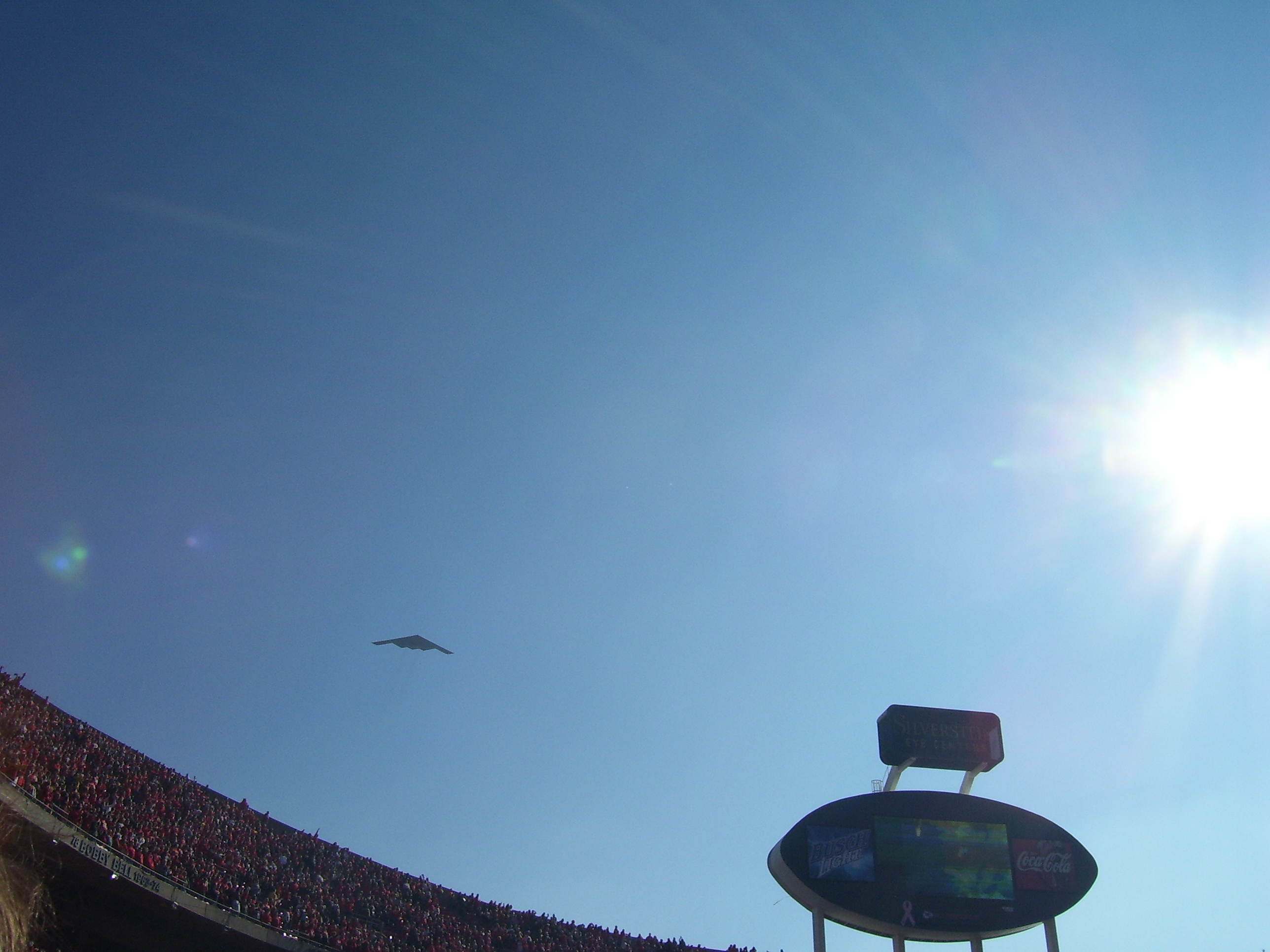
A B-2 Spirit (from Whiteman Air Force Base) flies over Arrowhead Stadium prior to a Kansas City Chiefs-Oakland Raiders National Football League game, 2006

Flypasts also demonstrate national pride at landmark entertainment and sporting events.

- Canada: The Snowbirds perform a flypast after the national anthem O Canada at each annual Grey Cup event, which is the largest sporting event in Canada. Flypasts have also been fairly commonplace at playoff games involving the aptly named Winnipeg Jets of the NHL, flying above the Winnipeg Jets Street Party fan viewing area outside of Canada Life Centre following the performance of O Canada.
- Italy: Among the celebrations in of the Football World Cup victory in 2006 was a flypast by the Frecce Tricolori at Pratica di Mare, streaming the red, green, and white of the Italian flag.
- United States: Flyovers are common at professional sports and racing events after the performance of The Star-Spangled Banner. The flyover had been a strong NASCAR tradition, as every major race features one, usually performed by an Air Force or Air National Guard wing based in the area, and in some cases naval and marine air units. Army helicopters have also occasionally performed them. It is also a staple of the national anthem at the NFL Super Bowl, MLB World Series games and the Major League Baseball All-Star Game. A flyover occurs at the beginning of the Men's Final of the US Open Tennis Championships. This is usually performed by the Blue Angels, the official U.S. Navy aerobatics demonstration squadron. A flyby takes places prior to the start of the Indianapolis 500 mile race, the largest single-day sporting event in the world. Held annually on Memorial Day weekend, U.S. military aircraft perform a flyby while "Taps" is played in remembrance of Memorial Day. In some years, multiple aircraft participate, executing the missing man formation. In most racing events in NASCAR, flyovers are held, especially at the Daytona 500.

== Entertainment ==
New Zealand showed its pride at being the location for The Lord of the Rings, at the premiere in Wellington of the third film in the trilogy, The Return of the King. An Air New Zealand Boeing 747-400 flew in Lord of the Rings livery in a historic flight over Auckland, Hamilton, Tauranga, Gisborne and Napier, "enabling more than two million people, one in two New Zealanders, to share in the excitement of The Lord of the Rings". This was the first time that a 747-400 had undertaken such a flypast in New Zealand.

== Memorials ==
The funeral of Italian tenor Luciano Pavarotti was sealed by a flypast from Frecce Tricolori over Modena Cathedral, his native town, on 8 September 2007. Tens of thousands of people who had filed past his coffin as it lay in state, witnessed the show of respect and mourning.

The memorial service for former Australian Prime Minister Gough Whitlam on 5 November 2014 concluded with a flypast by four RAAF F/A-18 Hornets in missing man formation.

The 2022 national funeral for Montreal Canadiens hockey legend Guy Lafleur, the franchise's leading scorer, concluded with a flyover from an RCAF CF-18 fighter jet as the funeral procession left Montreal's Mary Queen of the World Cathedral.

== Accidents and incidents ==
- 31 May 1957: A Royal Canadian Navy (RCN) McDonnell F2H-3 Banshee spiraled out of control after its right wing broke in half during a high-speed flypast of naval air station HMCS Shearwater, Nova Scotia, Canada. The pilot failed to eject and was killed when the plane slammed into McNabs Island. The crash was attributed to improperly manufactured fittings in the folding wing mechanism, and most RCN and US Navy Banshees were grounded until improved fittings were installed.
- 7 June 1957: A Chance Vought Aircraft pilot was killed when his Vought F8U-1 Crusader disintegrated as he initiated a zoom climb during a high-speed flypast for a graduating class from the Naval Postgraduate School at Hensley Field, Dallas, Texas.
- 1 October 2002: Two Ilyushin Il-38 maritime patrol aircraft of the Indian Navy collided in mid-air during a flypast near Panjim, Goa, to celebrate the 25th anniversary of 315 Squadron of the Indian Naval Air Arm. The collision and subsequent crash killed all six crew members in each aircraft and three bystanders on the ground.
- 11 October 2003: Hundreds of Canberra residents panicked and called police after a flypast of Parliament House, Canberra, by two F-111 jets, celebrating the 100th anniversary of the High Court of Australia. Witnesses saw "two thunderously loud balls of flame screaming overhead at a height of about 300 metres [980 ft] and heading toward the city's landmarks", and some mistook the fighters for incoming missiles, believing that a terrorist attack was in progress. Press releases were issued but police had not been informed.
- 21 January 2021: An F/A-18 Super Hornet of the US Navy Blue Angels aerobatic team veered off course while practicing a high-speed "sneak pass" at Naval Air Facility El Centro in California in preparation for a planned air show there, passing within 30 m (100 ft) of a building. The intense shockwave from the fighter jet traveling at an estimated 1,100 km/h (700 mph) caused US$180,000 in damage to the building and injured a dozen naval personnel inside.

== See also ==
- Missing man formation
- Soviet air show
