= Rijsenhout =

- Village
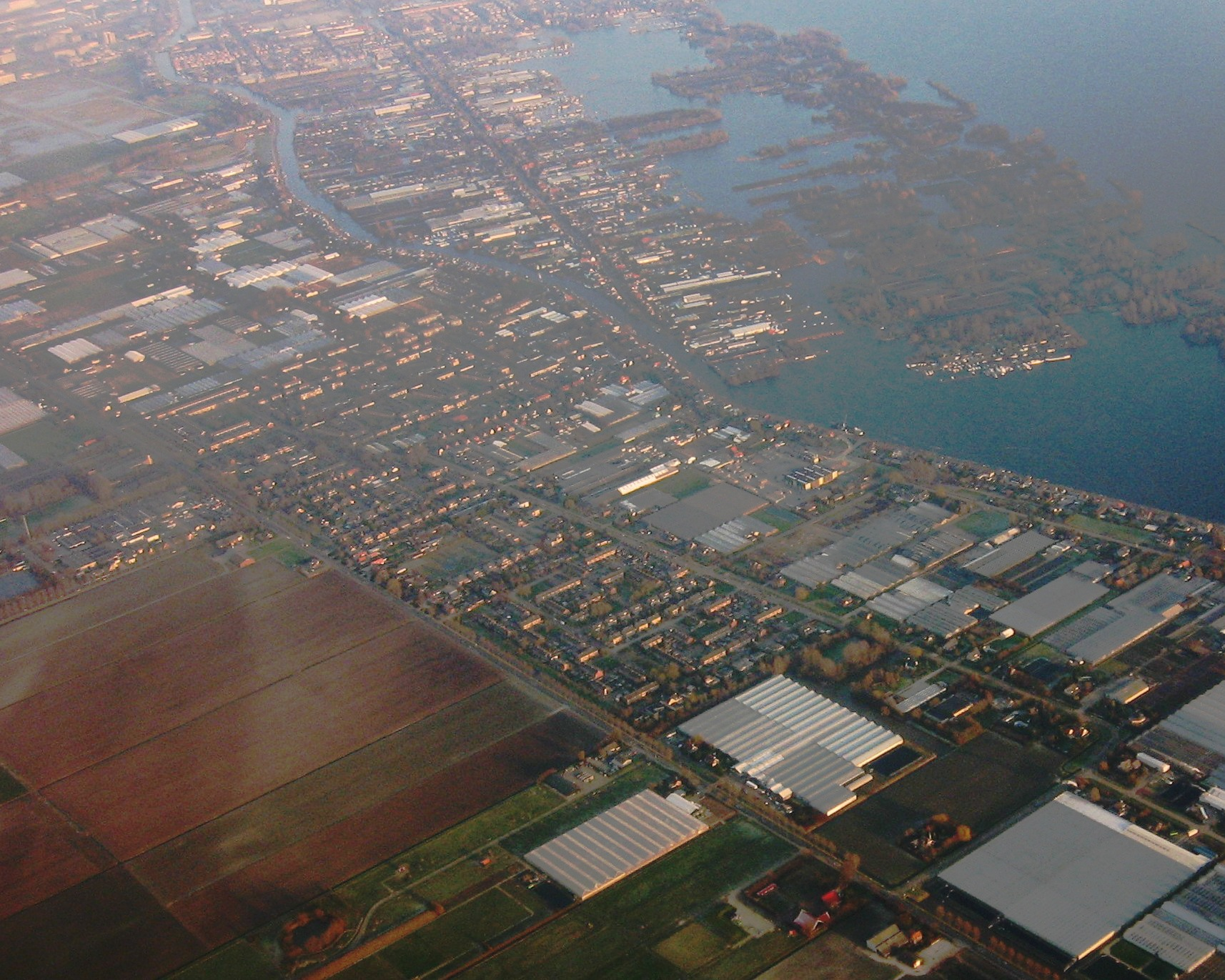
- Aerial photo with a view of Rijsenhout and the Westeinderplassen

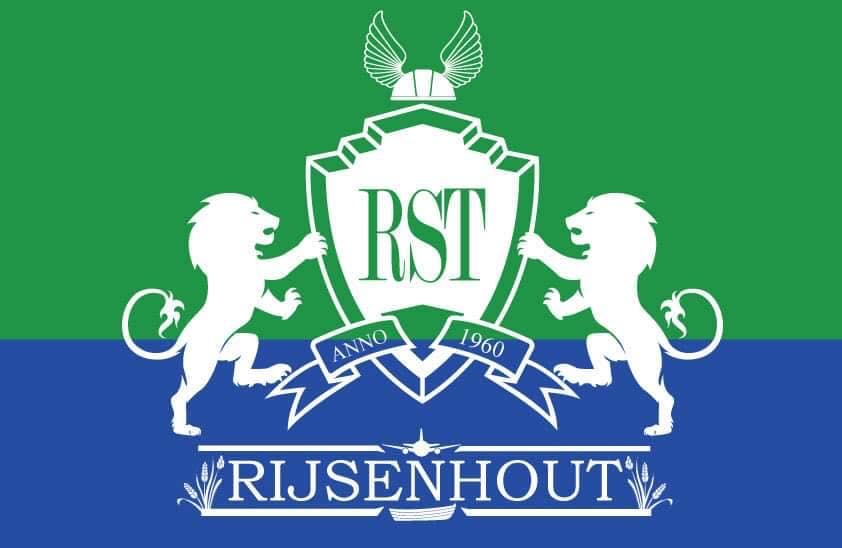
- Flag

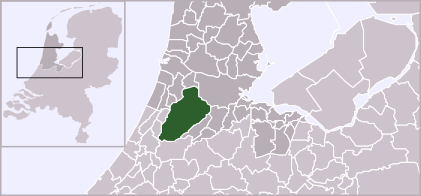

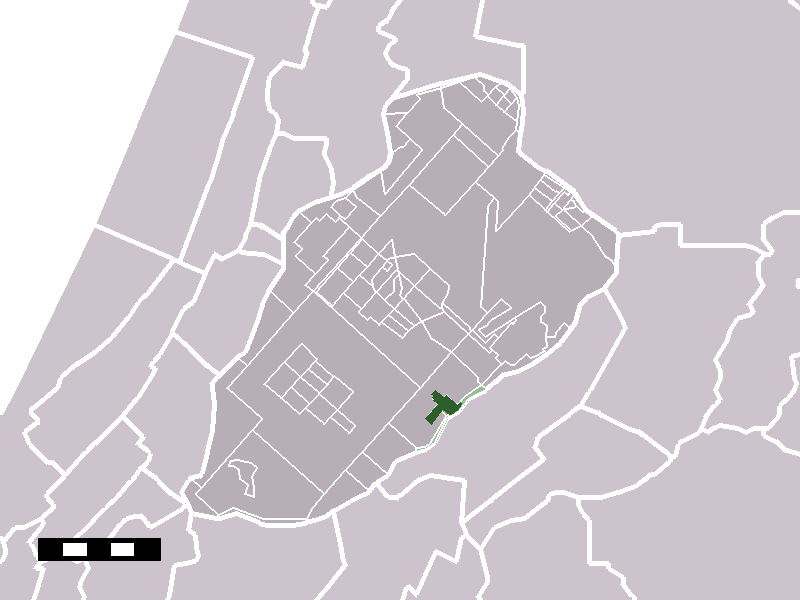
- The town centre (darkgreen) and the statistical district (lightgreen) of Rijsenhout in the municipality of Haarlemmermeer.
- Coordinates: 52°16′N 4°42′E
- Country: Netherlands
- Province: North Holland
- Municipality: Haarlemmermeer

Population (January 2008)
  - Total: 4,103
- Time zone: UTC+1 (CET)
  - Summer (DST): UTC+2 (CEST)

Rijsenhout is a village in the Dutch province of North Holland. It is a part of the municipality of Haarlemmermeer, and lies about 6 km southeast of Hoofddorp. In 2001, the village of Rijsenhout had 3072 inhabitants. The built-up area of the town was 0.63 km^{2}, and contained 1237 residences. The wider statistical area of Rijsenhout has a population of around 4540.
