= Missing man formation =

Flight formation to honor people

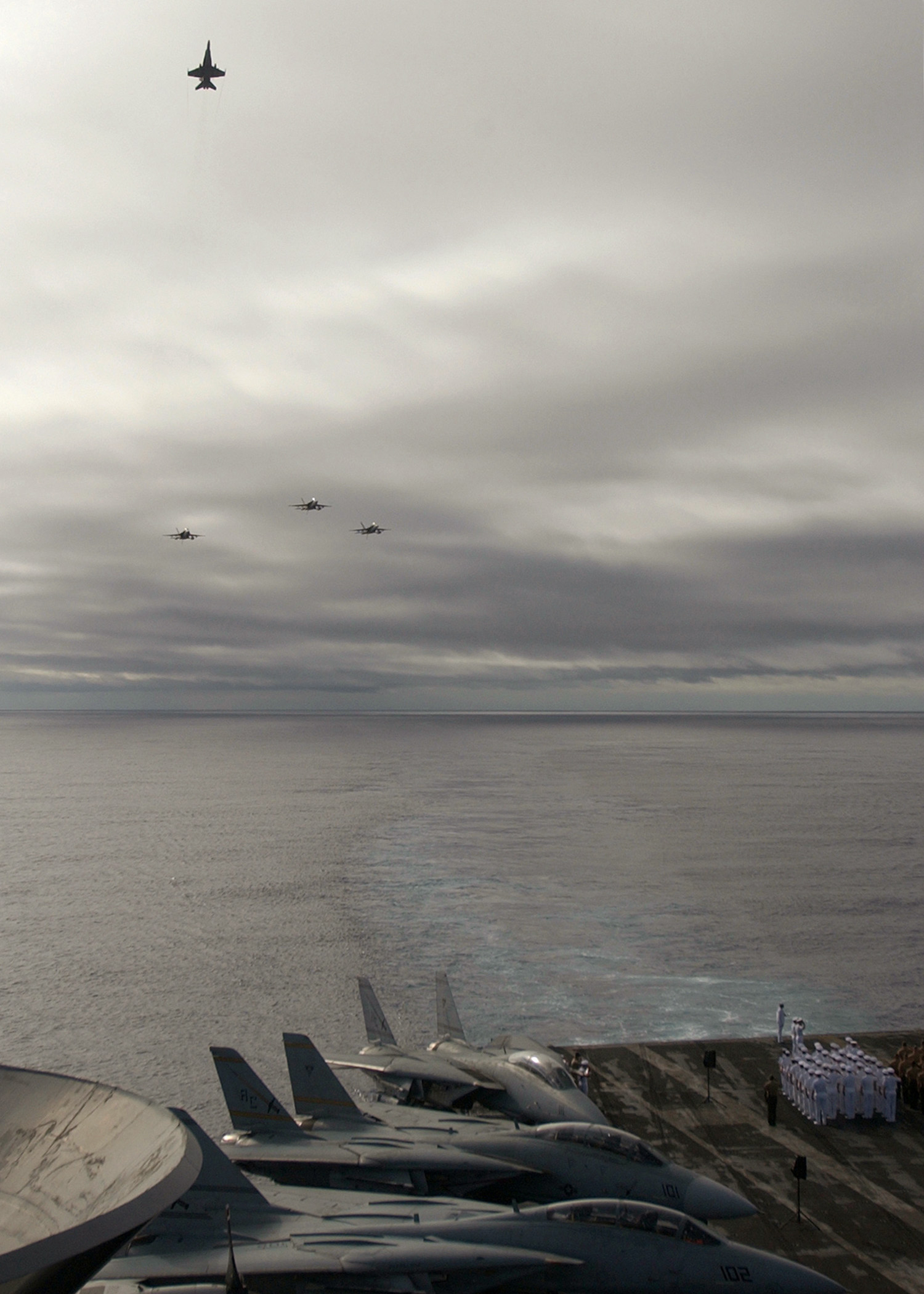
- Pilots assigned to Carrier Air Wing Three (CVW-3) perform a Missing Man Flyover formation, above USS Harry S. Truman (CVN-75), during a wreath-laying ceremony held on the flight deck in memory of a service member killed during a training accident.
- Status: active
- Genre: Memorial service salute
- Major events: airshows, sporting events

The missing man formation is an aerial salute performed as part of a flypast of aircraft at a funeral or memorial event, typically in memory of a fallen pilot, a well-known military service member or veteran, or a well-known political figure. The planes fly in a formation that leaves a space where one plane should be, symbolizing the person's absence. Though similar formations have occurred as early as World War I, the first flypast in the modern formation of four planes is believed to have occurred in 1931 at the funeral for Charles W. "Speed" Holman.

Missing man formations are also used in motorsport in memory of a recently deceased driver and in American football and ice hockey in memory of a recently deceased player.

== Description ==
Missing man formation based on finger-four; Flight leader (#1), lead's wingman (#2), and second element lead's wingman (#4) are present, but second element lead (#3) has departed or is not present.

Several variants of the formation are seen. The formation most commonly used in the United States is based on the "finger-four" aircraft combat formation composed of two pairs of aircraft. The aircraft fly in a V-shape with the flight leader at the point and their wingman on their left. The second element leader and his wingman fly on the right. The formation flies over the ceremony low enough to be clearly seen and the second element leader abruptly pulls up out of the formation while the rest of the formation continues in level flight until all aircraft are out of sight.

In an older variant, the formation is flown with the second element leader position conspicuously empty. In another variation, the flight approaches from the south, preferably near sundown, and one of the aircraft will suddenly split off to the west, flying into the sunset. In all cases, the aircraft performing the pull-up, split off, or missing from the formation is honoring the person (or persons) who has died, and is representing their departure.

== Sports and media ==
The formation has been practiced in multiple ways to honor a player, actor or driver who recently died.

In motorsports, the formation is usually done during the starting pace laps before the green flag is waved. When NASCAR driver Adam Petty died in a 2000 crash at New Hampshire International Speedway, the pole position winners for that weekend's Truck and Busch Series races left their starting positions open to create the missing man formation. In 2001, the formation was performed during the pace laps of the Dura Lube 400 at Rockingham after the death of Dale Earnhardt in the Daytona 500 the week before. The formation was performed again by NASCAR in 2026 during the Coca-Cola 600 after Kyle Busch died from an illness days prior to the race. In IndyCar, after the death of Dan Wheldon in the 2011 IZOD IndyCar World Championship at Las Vegas, the race was abandoned and drivers performed a five-lap, three-wide salute in his honor. A pit stop variant of the missing man formation was done in the 1991 Pit Crew Challenge by Bill Elliott's team to honor rear tire changer Mike Rich after he was killed in a pit accident at the 1990 Atlanta Journal 500: the team serviced Elliott's car as usual, but left the right rear tire unchanged. Also, in Fast & Furious 7, Paul Walker’s character drives in a “missing man” formation as a tribute to the late actor.

In American football, deceased players are honored by their team on the first play of the game by taking the field but leaving a spot where the player would have lined up. Play typically does not occur so the clock expires, leading to a delay of game penalty that the other team declines to let the affected side resume without losing yardage. In 2007, after the murder of Sean Taylor, the Washington Redskins' defense did not have a safety for the first play against the Buffalo Bills.

Ice hockey does a similar formation. After the death of Johnny Gaudreau and his brother Matthew during the 2024 offseason, the Columbus Blue Jackets left Gaudreau's spot empty on the ice for the opening faceoff of the team's home opener.

== In memorials ==
Missing Man sculptures

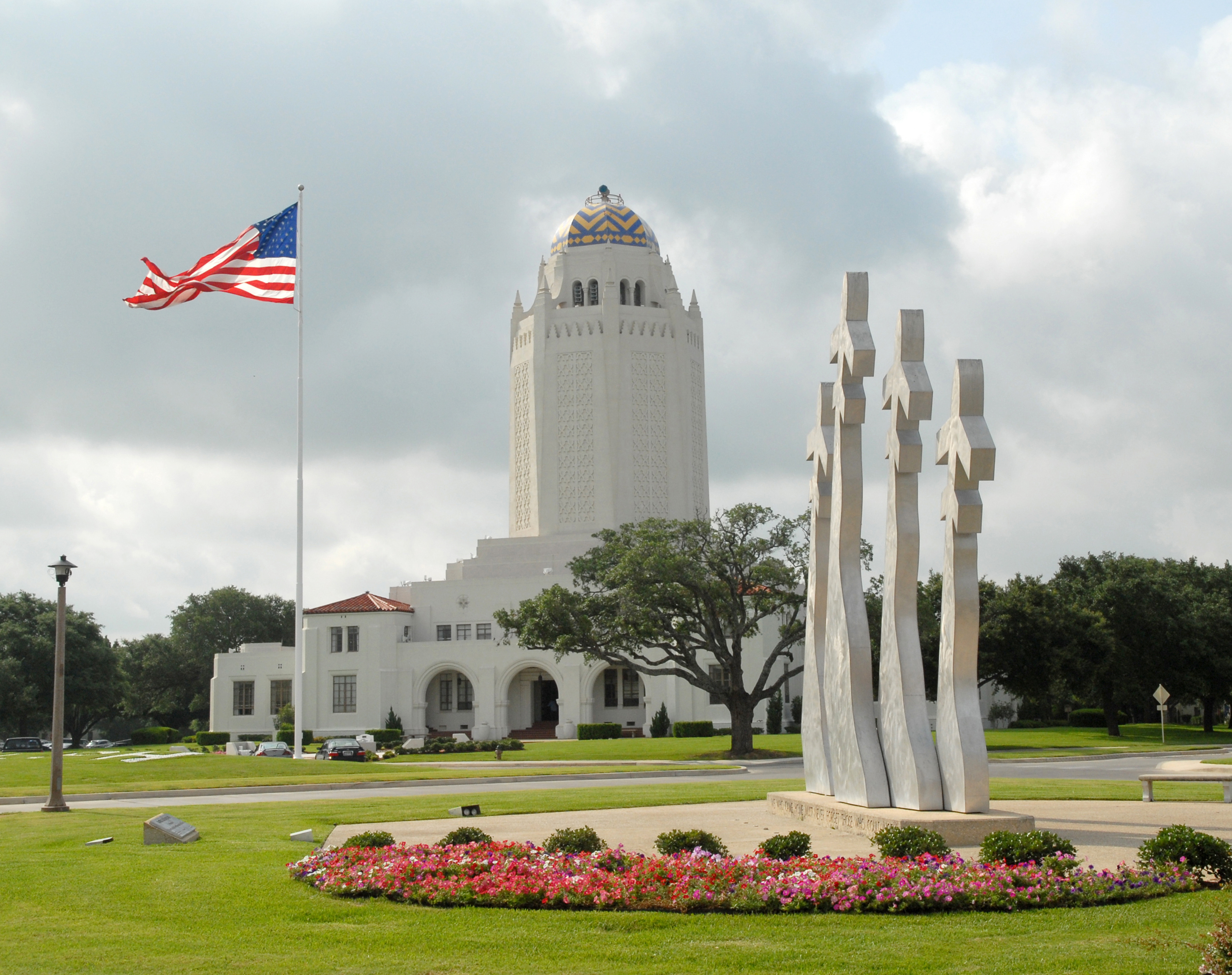
Missing Man Monument (1977) at Randolph AFB

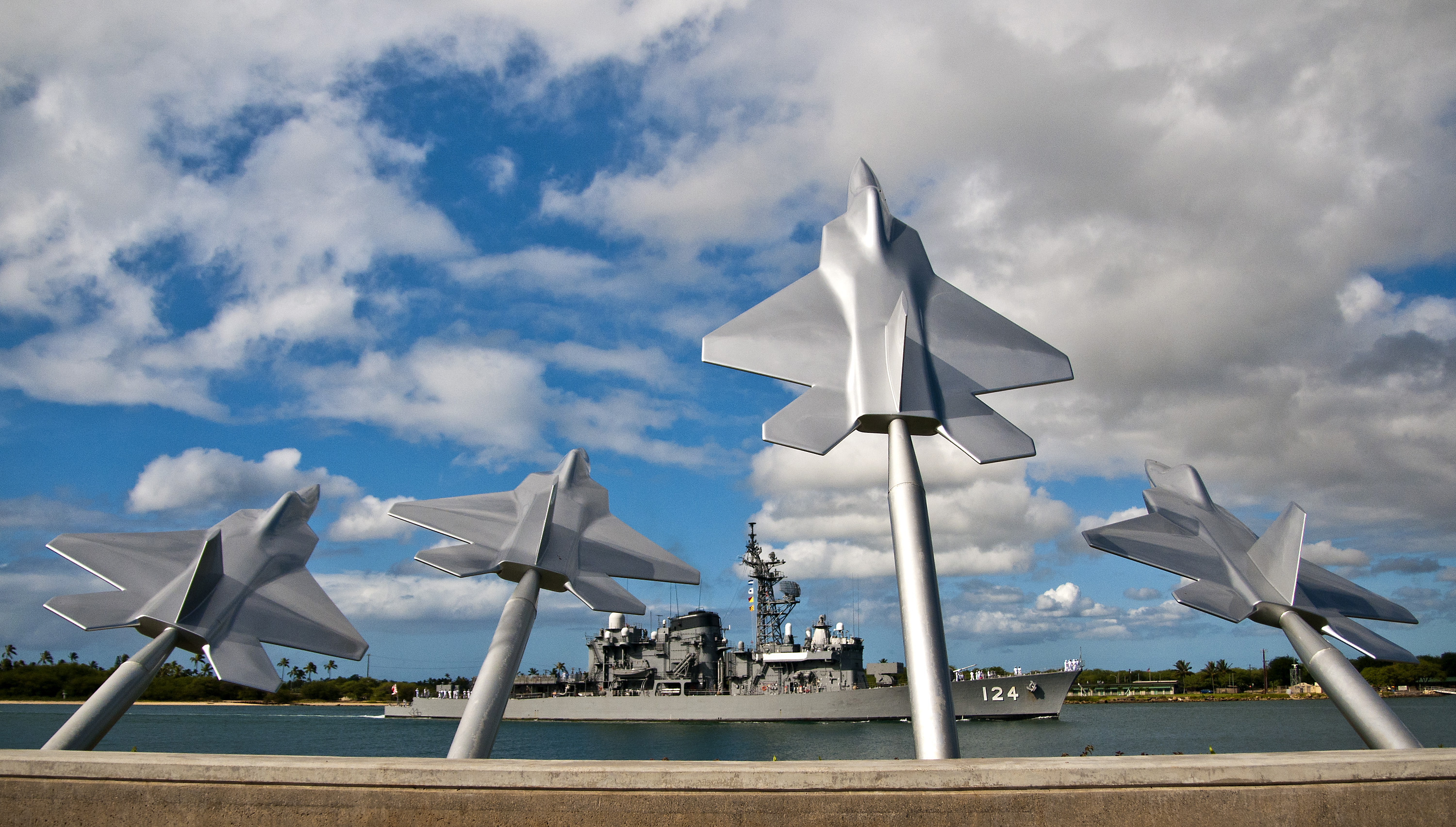
Missing Man Memorial (1995) at Joint Base Pearl Harbor–Hickam

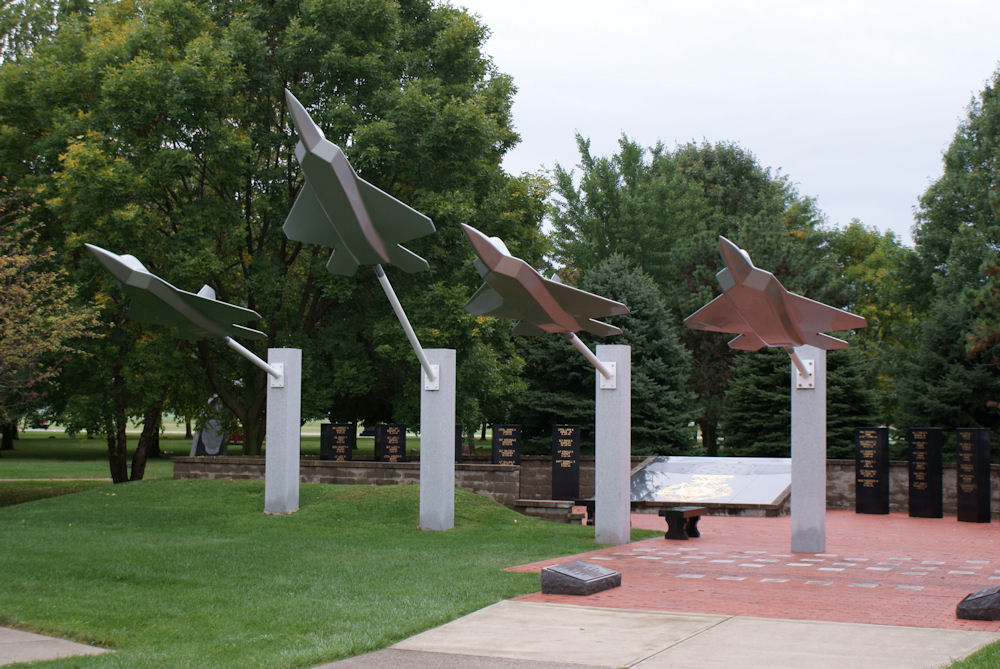
Missing Man Formation (2000) at Valor Park, USAF Museum

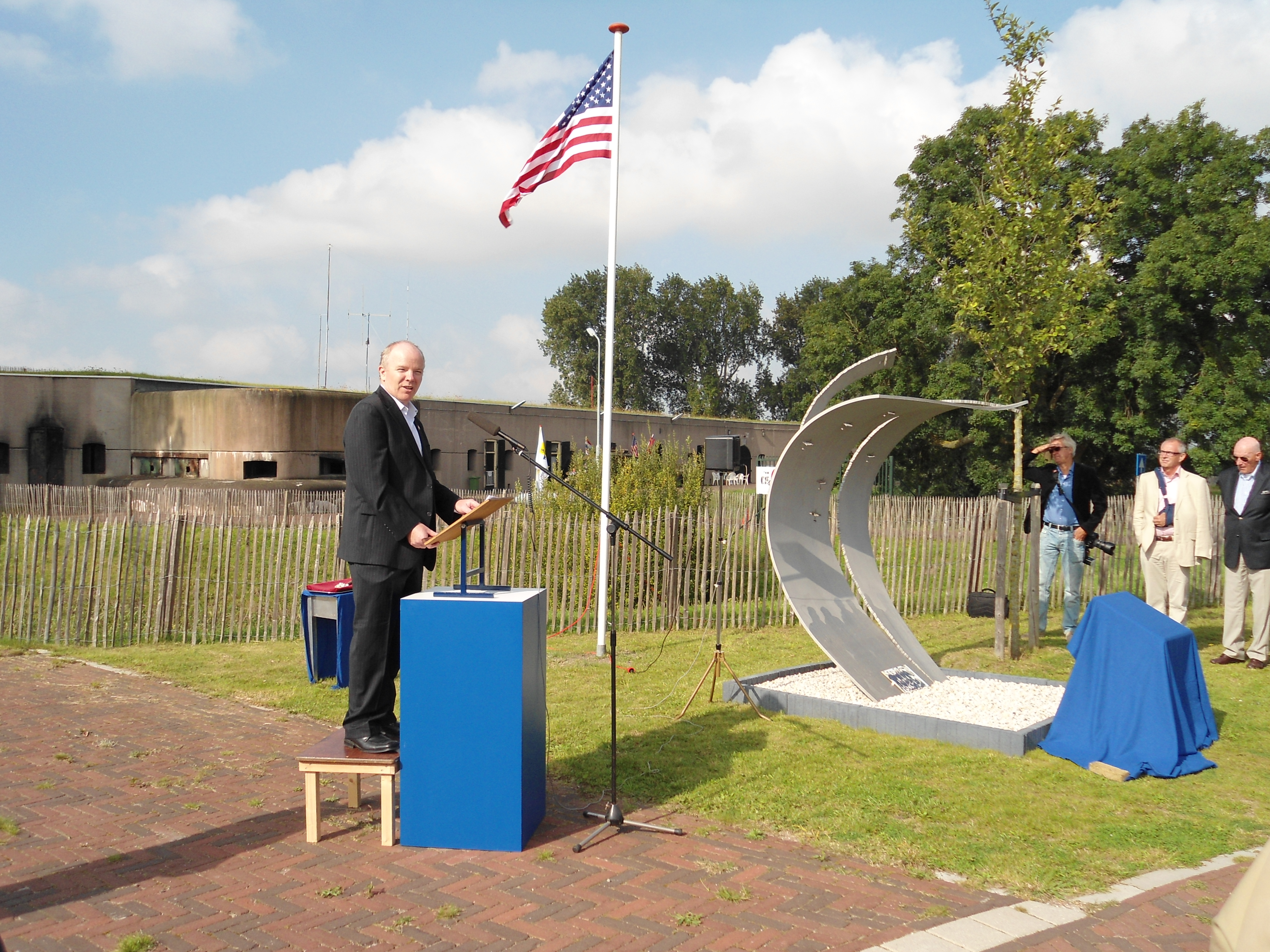
Missing Man Salute (2004) at Rijsenhout

Permanent memorial sculptures depicting the missing man aerial formation exist at Randolph Air Force Base (Missing Man Monument, 1977, Mark Pritchett) in San Antonio, Texas, Joint Base Pearl Harbor–Hickam (Missing Man Memorial, 1995) in Honolulu, Hawaii, and Valor Park (Missing Man Formation, 2000) near the National Museum of the United States Air Force in Dayton, Ohio.

Outside the United States, a missing man memorial was dedicated at the Militaire Luchtvaart Museum (Missing man salute, 2004, Leendert Verboom) near Soesterberg Air Base in the Netherlands to commemorate the 21 June 1944 crash of the Consolidated B-24 Liberator "Connie" following a bombing raid in Germany; it was moved to the CRASH Luchtoorlog- en Verzetsmuseum '40-'45 museum near Rijsenhout in 2014.

== See also ==
- Riderless horse
- Three-volley salute
