= Lockheed L-649 Constellation =

US airliner with 4 piston engines, 1946

L-649 Constellation
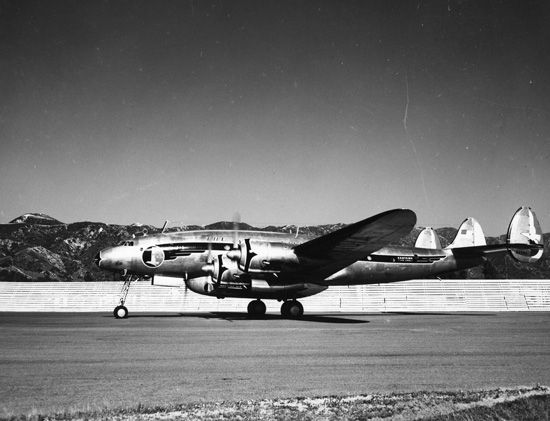
- An Eastern Air Lines L-649 Constellation, with the optional "Speedpak" belly-mounted cargo hold

General information
- Type: Airliner
- National origin: United States
- Manufacturer: Lockheed
- Designer: Clarence "Kelly" Johnson
- Status: Retired
- Primary users: Eastern Air Lines Chicago and Southern Airlines; Trans World Airlines (Operated one L-649)
- Number built: 22

History
- Manufactured: 1946 - 1951
- Introduction date: 1947
- First flight: October 19, 1946
- Developed from: L-049 Constellation
- Developed into: L-749 Constellation

The Lockheed L-649 Constellation was the first real civilian version of the Lockheed Constellation line, as the Lockheed L-049 Constellation was a simple redesign from the military Lockheed C-69 Constellation. The L-649 was planned to be the new standard version of the Constellation, but the L-749 Constellation, a co-jointly produced improved derivative, was chosen over the L-649 by most airlines. Most of the few L-649 aircraft built were delivered and operated by Eastern Air Lines.

== History ==
When Curtiss-Wright offered an improved version of the Wright R-3350 Duplex-Cyclone, Lockheed began developing an improved version of the L-049 Constellation airliner to be powered by this engine. The new project was designated L-049-84. In addition to the engine change, the wing and fuselage structure were strengthened to allow an increased gross weight. The cabin was redesigned and made more luxurious, incorporating changes such as retractable overhead sleeping berths, modernised air conditioning and retractable seats. Ten different cabin layouts were offered. Due to the loudness of the R-3350 engines, the insulation had been augmented through the use of multiple materials including non-inflammable cloth and fiberglass. The problem of overheating that plagued the original engines had been eliminated through the newer design of the R-3350 and the oil tanks being moved away from the engine nacelles. The oil tank capacity was also increased by 9 US gallons (34 L). The payload was increased by 1,846 pounds (837 kg). An extra removable cargo hold was designed to increase the payload of the aircraft. This was called a "Speedpak", and was to be used for shorter flights. The result was a completely new design, causing Lockheed to redesignate the aircraft L-649 due to the significant changes.

The first L-649 flew on October 19, 1946, and it received its certification in May 1947. The first L-649 was also delivered to Eastern Air Lines in May 1947. Eastern had modified its original order for 14 L-049 Constellations to 14 L-649 Constellations. Eastern was also the only airline to receive the L-649 straight from the production line itself, as Trans World Airlines and Air France converted their ordered L-649 aircraft into the improved derivative, the L-749 Constellation, which was to be produced alongside the L-649. In fact, the L-749 entered service a month before the L-649 did. A further incident occurred when TWA suffered a pilots' strike, causing them to cancel the original order for 8 L-049 and 18 L-649 aircraft. Only 16 original L-649 aircraft were produced. Six others were converted to L-649A standard and delivered to Chicago and Southern Air Lines. Most of the L-649 and L-649A aircraft would later be converted to L-749 and L-749A standards. When Chicago and Southern merged with Delta in 1953, several of these airplanes were sold to TWA.

== Variants ==
L-649
Standard production version, powered by four R-3350-749C18BD-1 engines. Sixteen built.

L-649A
Strengthened structure and extra fuel capacity for longer distances. Six built.

== Specifications (L-649) ==
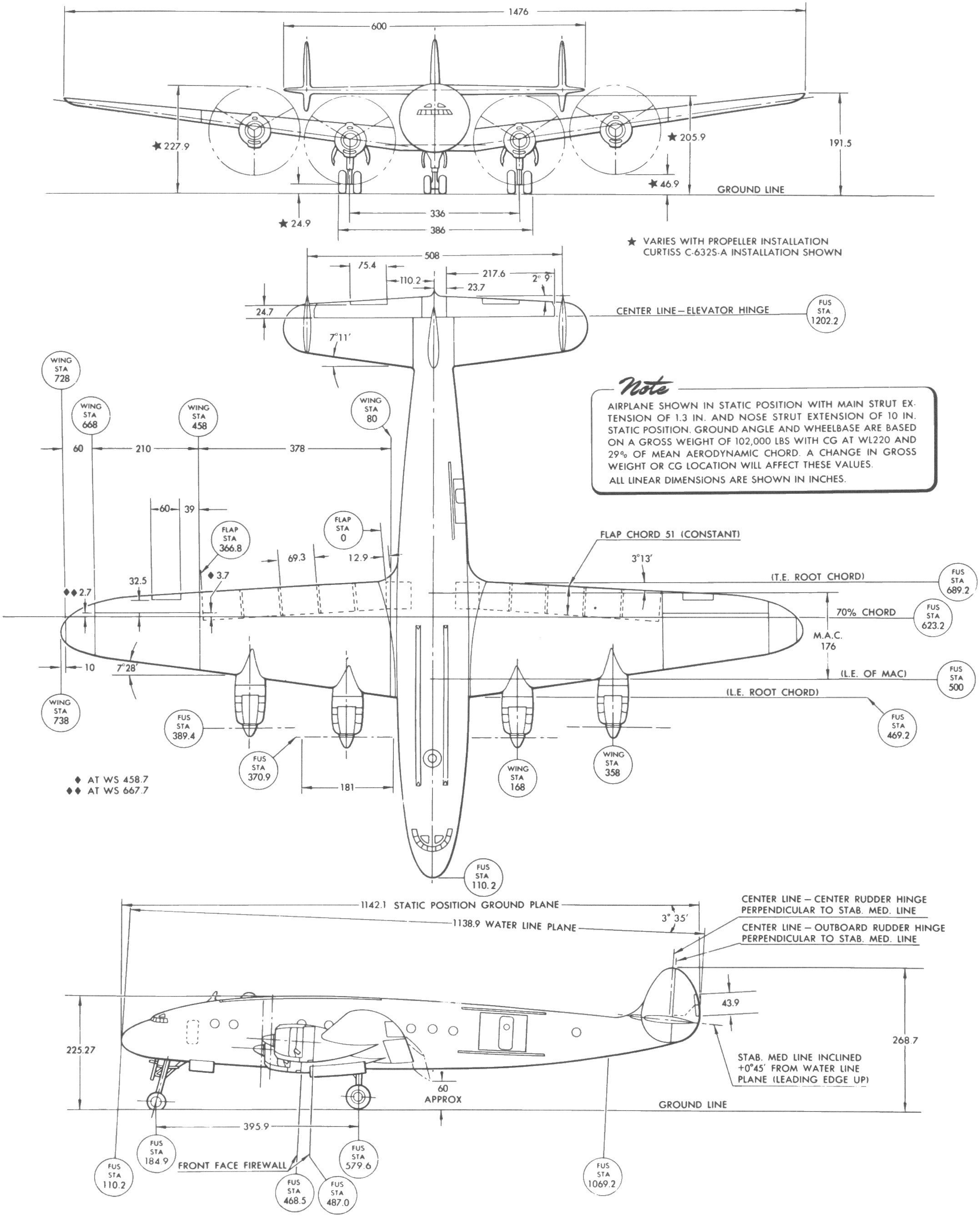
3-view line drawing of the Lockheed Model 649 Constellation

Data from American Museum of Aviation

General characteristics

- Crew: 5 (2 pilots, flight engineer, 2 stewards)
- Capacity: 60-81 Passengers / 39,000 lb (17,690 kg) payload
- Length: 95 ft 3 in (29.03 m)
- Wingspan: 123 ft (37 m)
- Height: 23 ft 8 in (7.21 m)
- Wing area: 1,650 sq ft (153 m^{2})
- Aspect ratio: 9.17
- Airfoil: root: NACA 23018; tip: NACA 4412
- Empty weight: 55,000 lb (24,948 kg)
- Max takeoff weight: 94,000 lb (42,638 kg)
- Powerplant: 4 × Wright R-3350-749C18BD Duplex-Cyclone 18-cylinder air-cooled radial piston engines, 2,500 hp (1,900 kW) each
- Propellers: 3-bladed constant-speed feathering propellers

Performance

- Maximum speed: 325 mph (523 km/h, 282 kn)
- Cruise speed: 272 mph (438 km/h, 236 kn)
- Range: 3,995 mi (6,429 km, 3,472 nmi) with maximum fuel

2,290 mi (1,990 nmi; 3,685 km) with maximum payload

- Service ceiling: 24,442 ft (7,450 m)
- Wing loading: 57 lb/sq ft (280 kg/m^{2})
- Power/mass: 9.4 lb/hp (5.7 kg/kW)

== See also ==
Related development

- Lockheed Constellation
- Lockheed L-049 Constellation
- Lockheed C-69 Constellation
- Lockheed L-749 Constellation
- Lockheed L-1049 Super Constellation
- Lockheed C-121/R7V Constellation
- Lockheed EC-121 Warning Star
- Lockheed L-1249 Super Constellation (R7V-2/YC-121F)
- Lockheed L-1649A Starliner

Aircraft of comparable role, configuration, and era

- Boeing 377 Stratocruiser
- Bristol Britannia
- Canadair North Star
- Douglas DC-6
- Douglas DC-7
- Ilyushin Il-18
- Lockheed L-188 Electra
- Republic XF-12 Rainbow
- Vickers Viscount

Related lists

- List of Lockheed aircraft
- List of models of the Lockheed Constellation
- List of Lockheed Constellation operators
