= Lockheed L-749 Constellation =

First version of Constellation with the ability to cross the Atlantic non-stop

L-749 Constellation
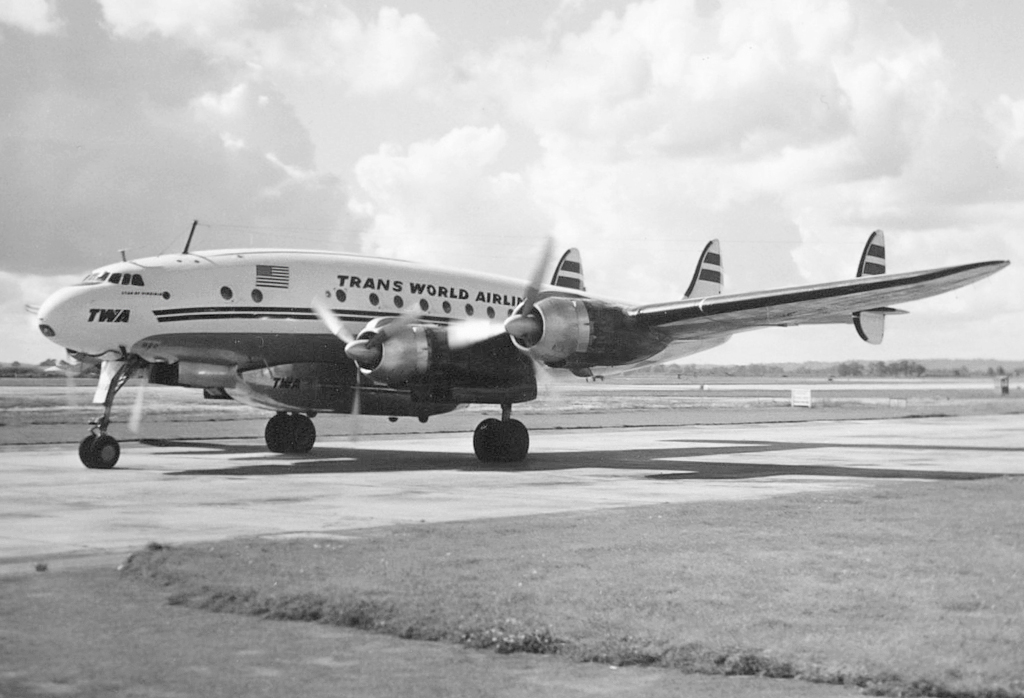
- A Trans World Airlines L-749A at London's Heathrow Airport. Note the "Speedpak" removable freight container beneath the fuselage.

General information
- Type: Airliner
- National origin: United States
- Manufacturer: Lockheed Corporation
- Primary users: Trans World Airlines Air France; KLM; Eastern Air Lines
- Number built: 119

History
- Manufactured: 1947–1951
- Introduction date: April 18, 1947
- First flight: March 14, 1947
- Retired: 1993
- Developed from: Lockheed L-649 Constellation
- Variants: Lockheed C-121 Constellation; Lockheed PO-1W/WV-1 Constellation
- Developed into: Lockheed L-1049 Super Constellation

The Lockheed L-749 Constellation is the first Lockheed Constellation to regularly cross the Atlantic Ocean non-stop. Although similar in appearance to the L-649 before it, the L-749 had a larger fuel capacity, strengthened landing gear, and eventually weather radar.

== Design and development ==
In early 1947, the Lockheed Aircraft Corporation unveiled the L-749, a derivative of its L-649 Constellation with fuel tanks to increase its maximum range by 1,000 statute miles (1,600 km). Due to the increased weight, the landing gear and tires had to be strengthened. Jet stacks were also introduced, increasing speed by 15 mph (24 km/h). These jet stacks increased the noise, requiring more insulation. As with the L-649, ten different layouts of the internal cabin were possible. Airlines originally attracted to the L-649 changed their orders to the L-749. The L-749 was to become the standard version of the regular Constellation.

The L-749 first flew on March 14, 1947, and received certification that same month. The first L-749 was delivered to Air France on April 18, 1947. Pan American World Airways received its first L-749 in June, and L-749 service began the same month on their "Round The World" service. The L-749 also entered service with various other airlines, including Trans World Airlines (TWA), KLM, Cubana de Aviación, Línea Aeropostal Venezolana and Avianca.

In March 1947, 1,200 jobs were lost at Lockheed, bringing production of the aircraft to a near stand-still. This was due to the end of military production from World War II bringing a reduction in the number of needed workers. A large order from the United States Air Force for 10 L-749As, designated C-121 Constellation, saved the Constellation program from cancellation. The United States Navy followed in, ordering two L-749As as PO-1Ws (later WV-1s). The first L-749A off the production lines were destined for the military.

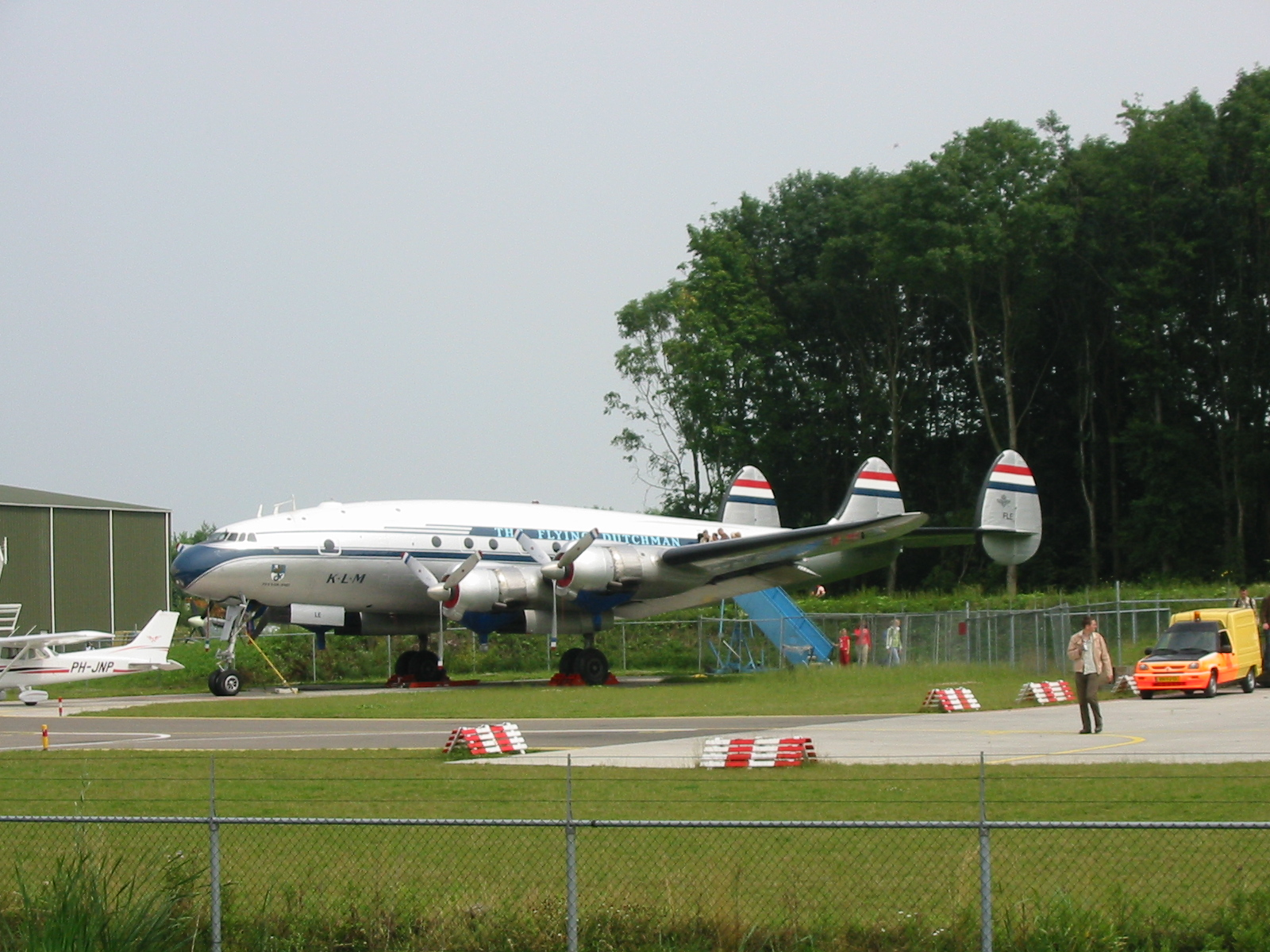
The Aviodrome's C-121A Constellation in the colors of a KLM L-749.

Lockheed started producing the improved L-749A in 1949. It had a strengthened fuselage, further strengthened landing gear and a Plycor floor. This increased its weight by over 4,000 pounds (1,800 kg) and increased the MTOW. Slightly redesigned engine cowlings and new Curtiss Electric propellers were also introduced. Lockheed also offered an L-749 to L-749A conversion kit. The first civil customer for the L-749A was South African Airways but its largest customer was TWA, which had 26 L-749As; the last of these were not retired until 1967. A cargo version of the L-749A based on the military C-121A was offered, but no airlines showed interest and it never left the drawing board. An L-749B turboprop version was envisaged, but this too never left the drawing board as no reliable engine was found. Production of the L-749A ended in 1951 to give way to its stretched successor, the L-1049 Super Constellation.

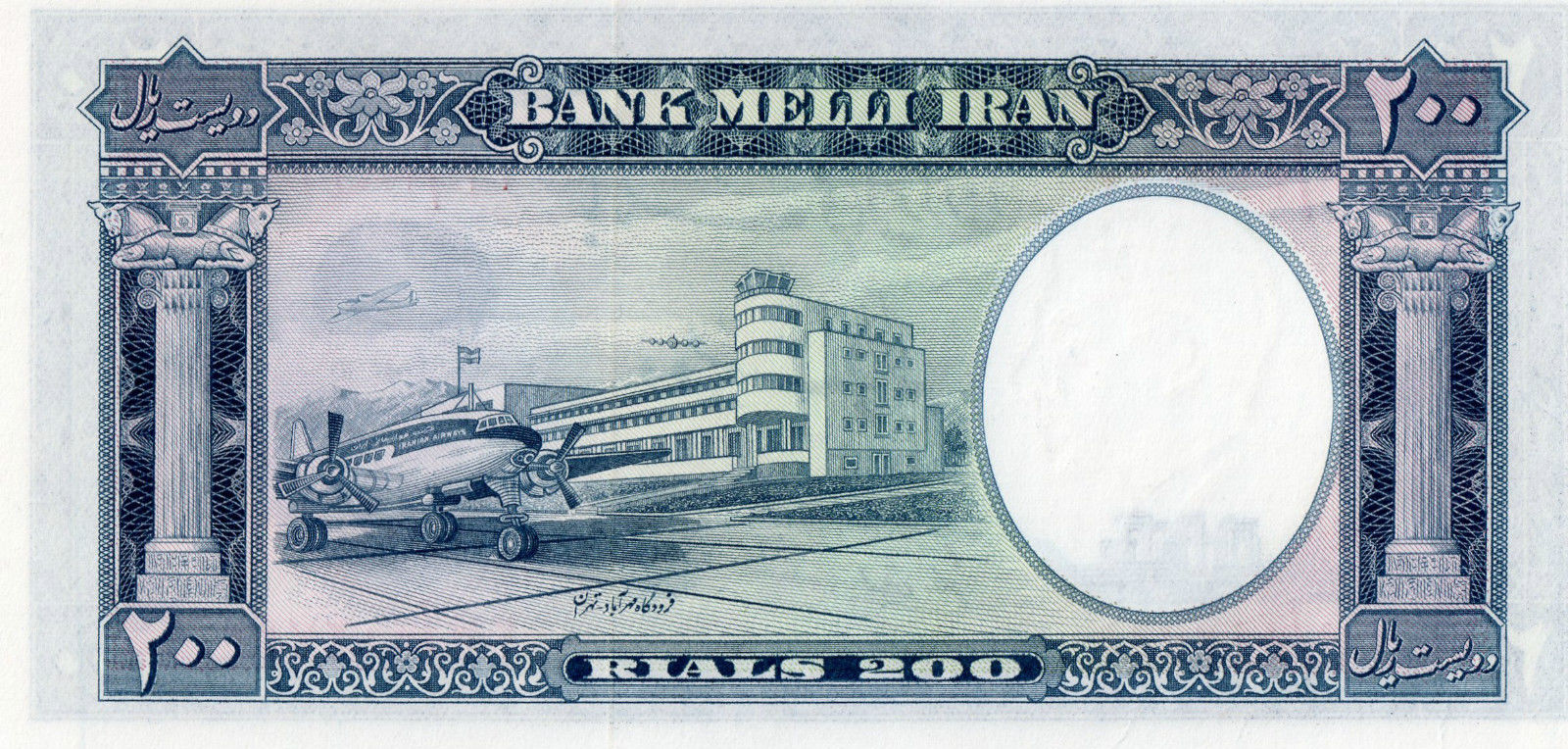
Iranian Airways L-749 on an Iranian 200 rial note from the 1950s

== Variants ==
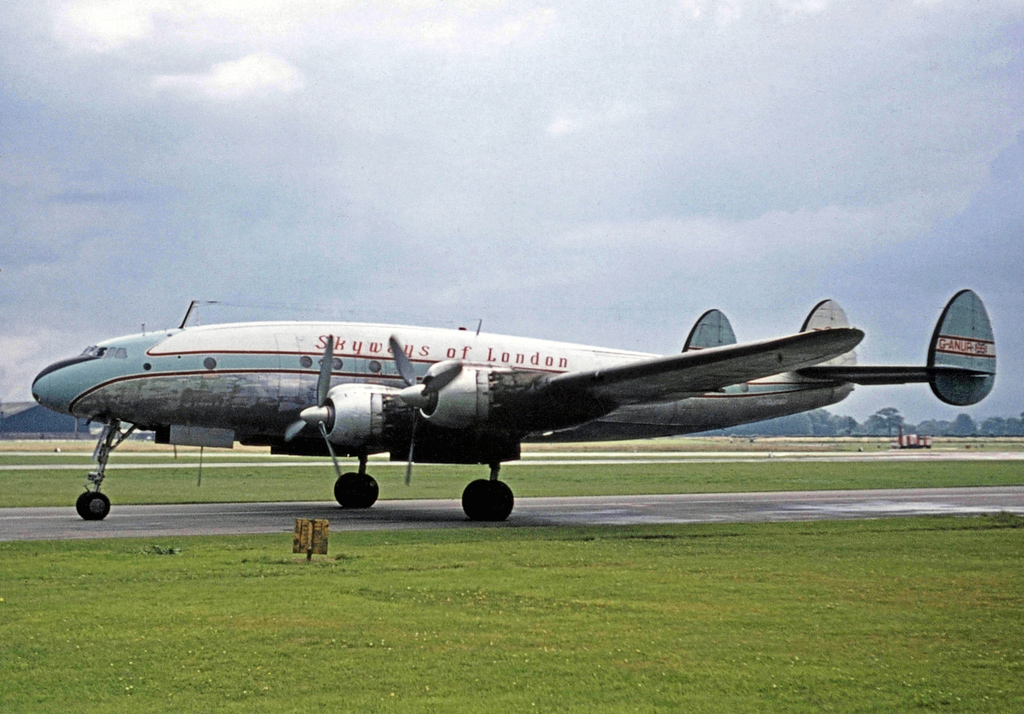
A Skyways of London L-749A at Manchester Ringway Airport on August 11, 1963.

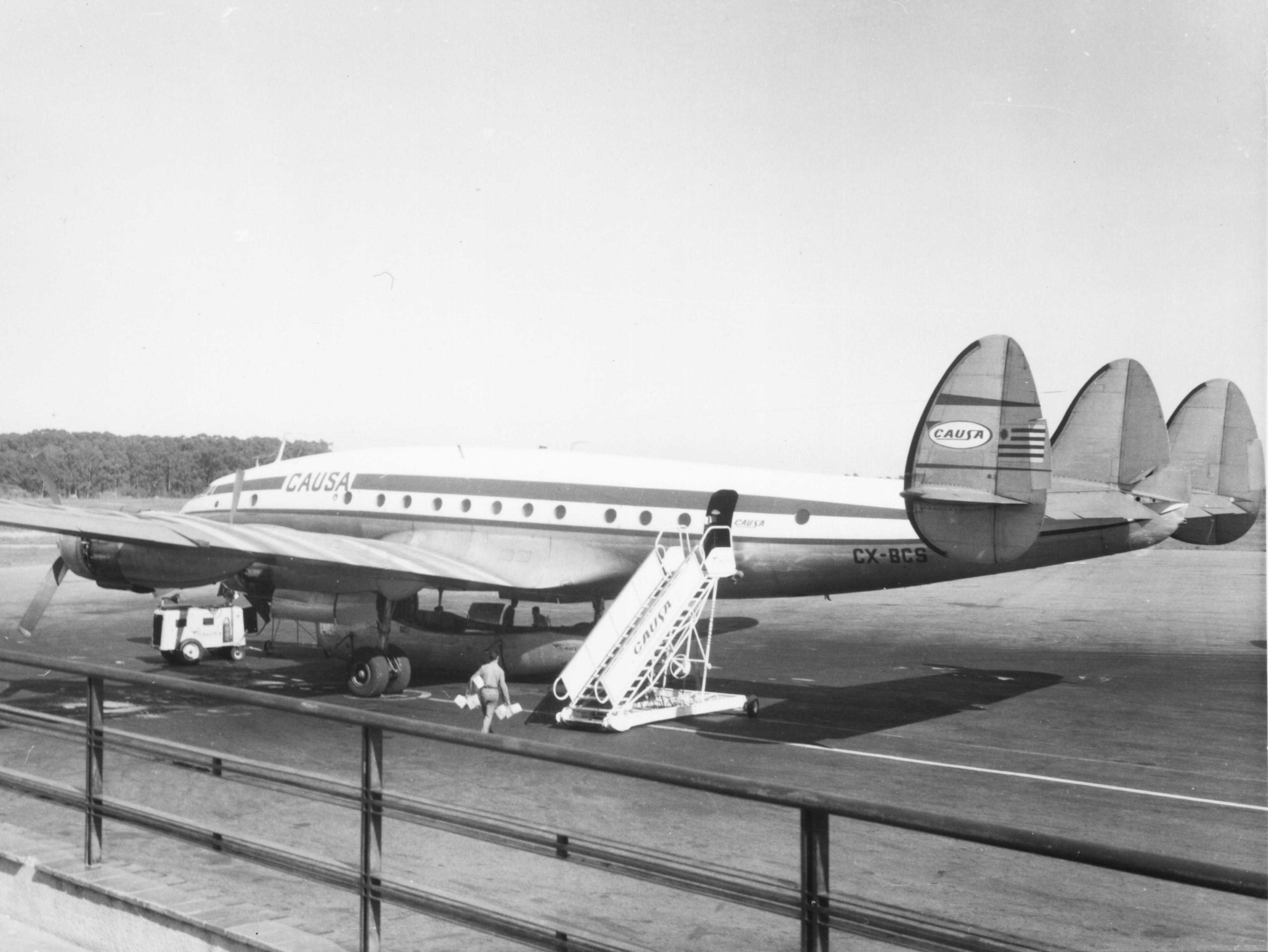
An L-749A of CAUSA.

L-749
Standard production version, powered by four Wright R-3350-749C18BD-1 radial engines. 60 built.

L-749A
Reinforced structure and an increased MTOW. 59 built.

L-749B
Proposed turboprop version. None built.

L-849
Planned version of L-749 powered by Wright R-3350 TurboCompound engines.

L-949
Proposed Speedfreighter combi version of L-849 with an 18 ft 4 in (5.59 m) fuselage stretch.

== Specifications (L-749) ==
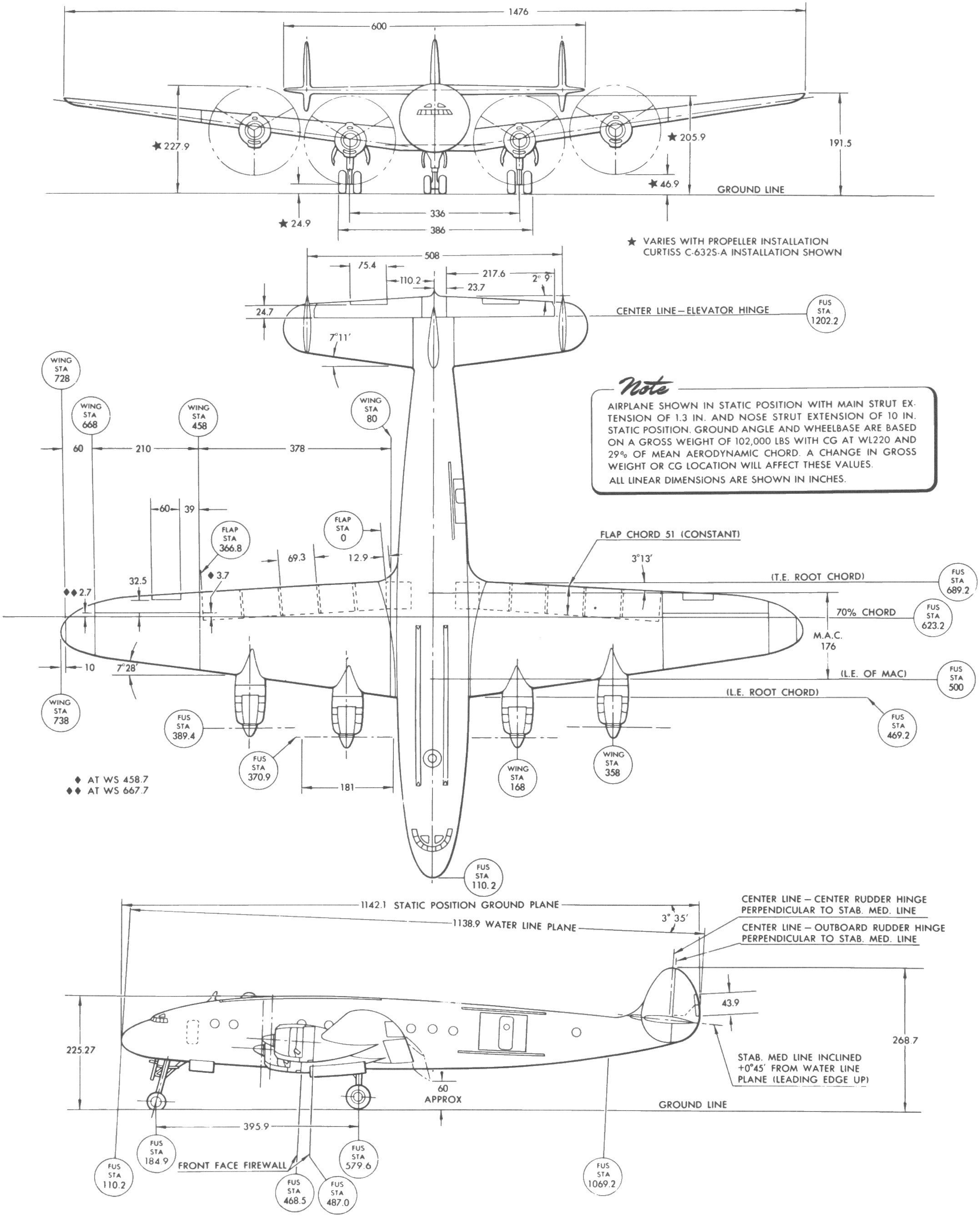
3-view line drawing of the Lockheed Model 649 Constellation

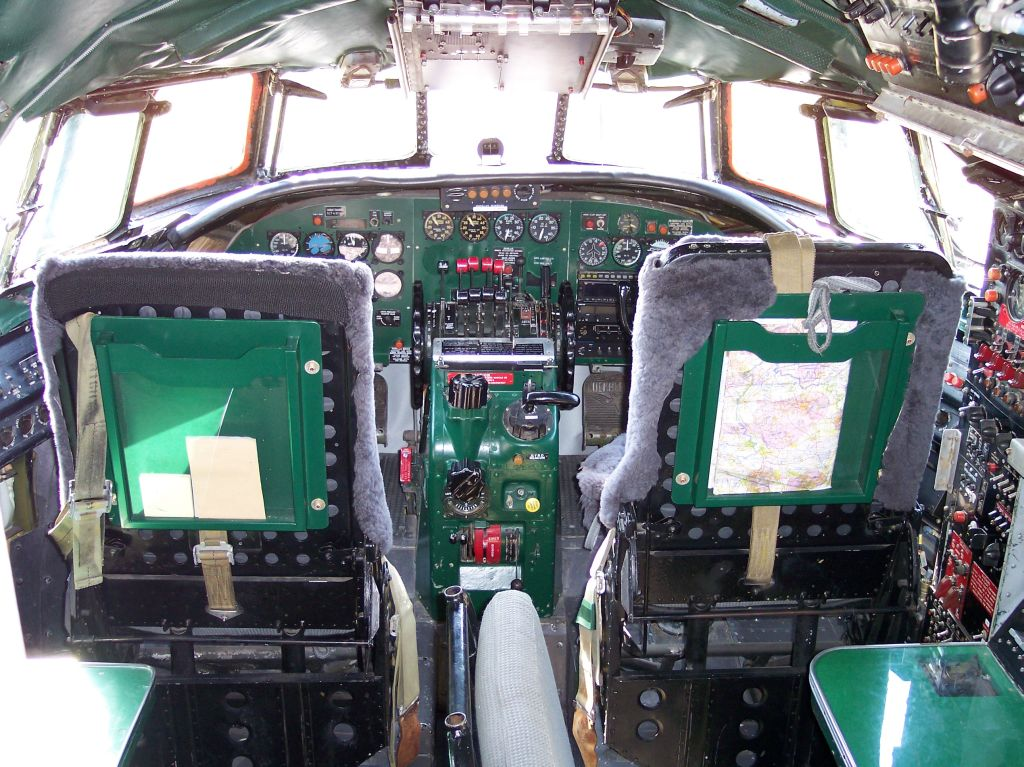
The cockpit of an L-749

Data from American Museum of Aviation.

General characteristics

- Crew: 6-8 (captain, first officer, radio operator, flight engineer, and 2-4 flight attendants)
- Capacity: 60-81 passengers
- Length: 97 ft 4 in (29.67 m)
- Wingspan: 123 ft (37 m)
- Height: 22 ft 5 in (6.83 m)
- Wing area: 1,650 sq ft (153 m^{2})
- Aspect ratio: 9.17
- Airfoil: root: NACA 23018; tip: NACA 4412
- Empty weight: 56,590 lb (25,669 kg)
- Max takeoff weight: 107,000 lb (48,534 kg)
- Powerplant: 4 × Wright R-3350-749C18BD-1 Duplex-Cyclone 18-cylinder air-cooled radial piston engines, 2,500 hp (1,900 kW) each
- Propellers: 3-bladed constant-speed fully feathering propellers

Performance

- Maximum speed: 345 mph (555 km/h, 300 kn)
- Cruise speed: 320 mph (510 km/h, 280 kn)
- Range: 4,995 mi (8,039 km, 4,341 nmi) maximum fuel

2,600 mi (2,259 nmi; 4,184 km) maximum payload

- Service ceiling: 24,100 ft (7,300 m)

== See also ==
Related development

- Lockheed Constellation
- Lockheed L-049 Constellation
- Lockheed C-69 Constellation
- Lockheed L-649 Constellation
- Lockheed L-1049 Super Constellation
- Lockheed C-121/R7V Constellation
- Lockheed EC-121 Warning Star
- Lockheed L-1649A Starliner

Aircraft of comparable role, configuration, and era

- Boeing 377 Stratocruiser
- Bristol Britannia
- Douglas DC-4
- Douglas DC-6
- Douglas DC-7
- Ilyushin Il-18
- Lockheed L-188 Electra
- Republic XF-12 Rainbow
- Vickers Viscount

Related lists

- List of Lockheed aircraft
- List of models of the Lockheed Constellation
- List of Lockheed Constellation operators
