= List of Lockheed Constellation variants =

The Lockheed Constellation was an American civil airliner and military transport built in the 1940s and 1950s; this is a list of its variants. The aircraft was used for many roles, including one variant Columbine II becoming the first Air Force One. More commonly used for troop or cargo transport everywhere from Vietnam to Antarctica, there was also specialized variants for electronic warfare or with different engines such as turboprops.

== Commercial transport ==
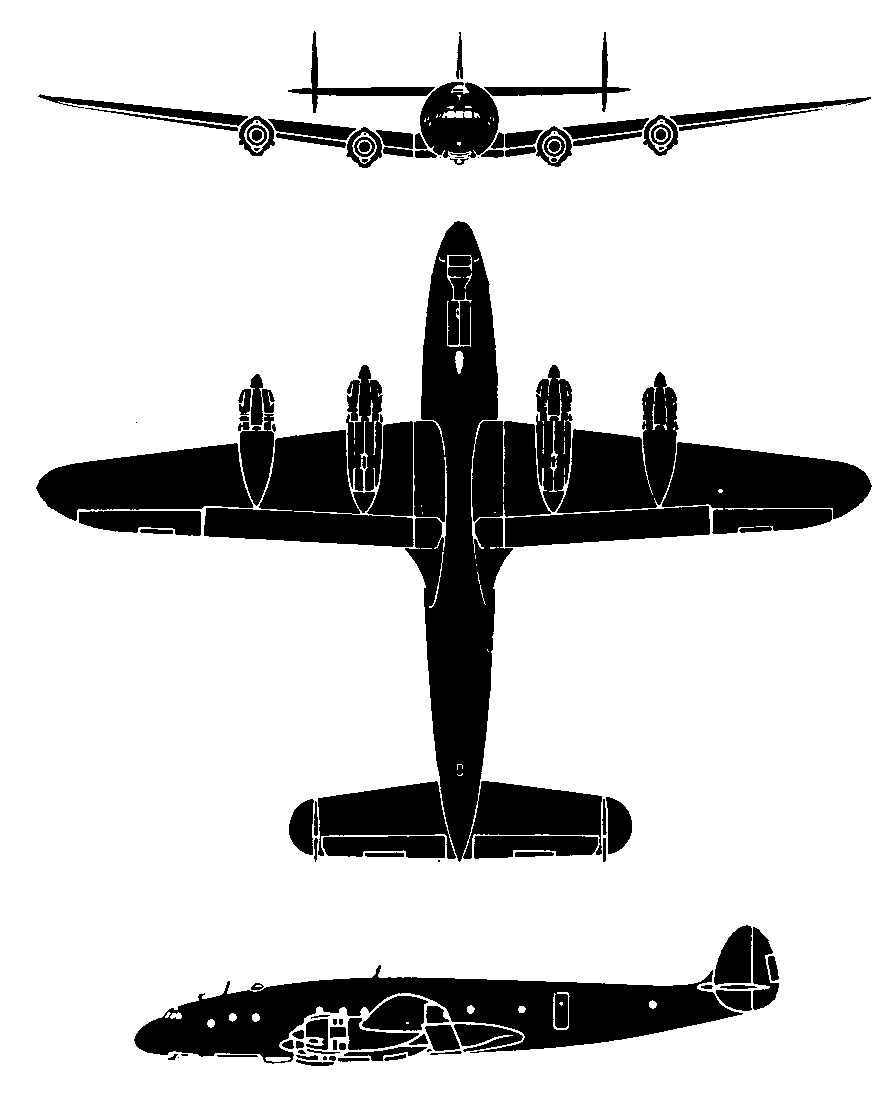
L-749A

== Civilian/company designations ==
L-049
The L-049 was the original commercial airliner produced, although some earlier L-049s were begun as military transports and completed as airliners. L-649 aircraft followed, with more powerful engines, but all were soon upgraded to L-749 standard with long-range fuel tanks. 88 L-049, 14 L-649, and 131 L-749 were built, including conversions from earlier models and military versions. First 22 aircraft delivered as C-69 transports, first flight 9 January 1943
L-149
L-049 conversion to include extra wing fuel tanks for a longer range. Production versions were planned for Pan Am, but none were ever produced.
L-249
Company designation for the XB-30 bomber. Project cancelled in favor of the Boeing B-29.
L-349
Company designation for the C-69B. None built.
L-449
Unknown proposed civilian airliner version.
L-549
Company designation for the C-69C. One built.
L-649
R-3350-749C18BD engines with 2,500 hp (1,865 kW) each, seating for up to 81, first flight 19 October 1946
L-649A
Reinforced landing gear and fuselage
L-749
6,145 US gal (23,640 L) of fuel providing the capability for non-stop transatlantic flights, first flight 14 March 1947
L-749A
Reinforced landing gear and fuselage
L-749B
Turbine powered. Project cancelled due to the absence of a suitable powerplant.
L-849
Planned version of the L-749, which would have had Wright R-3350 TurboCompounds.
L-949
Proposed Speedfreighter combi version of the L-849 with an 18 ft 4in fuselage stretch.
L-1049
First production version, 24 built. An 18 ft 4 in (5.59 m) stretched version with a maximum capacity of 109 passengers, square windows; all 1049C and later models had Turbo-Compound engines. Some later models had optional tip tanks. First flight 14 July 1951. 579 built, including military versions.
L-1049A
Company designation for the WV-2, WV-3, EC-121D and RC-121D.
L-1049B
Company designation for the R7V-1, RC-121C and VC-121E.
L-1049C
Civil variant of the 1049B for 110 passengers with four R-3350-87ТС18DA-1 Turbo-compound engines with 3,250 hp (2,425 kW) each, 48 built
L-1049D
Freight version of L-1049B with wing and fuselage modifications and a large cargo door, four built
L-1049E
Passenger variant of the 1049D, 28 built
L-1049F
Company designation for the C-121C.
L-1049G
Advanced variant with four R-3350-972ТС18DA-3 engines with higher METO power, ability to carry wingtip fuel tanks, 102 built
L-1049H
Passenger/freight convertible version of L-1049G with large cargo door, 53 built
L-1049J
Planned L-1049G with the wings of the R7V-2.
L-1149
A planned Allison turboprop version of the L-1049G and L-1049H.
L-1249A
Company designation for the R7V-2 and YC-121F.
L-1249B
Planned turboprop passenger version of the R7V-2/YC-121F.

L-1349 unidentified. Dominique Breffort's book claims no design with the L-1349 designation ever existed, possibly due to superstitious belief reasons.

L-1449
Proposed turboprop version of the L-1049G with a stretched fuselage and new wing.
L-1549
Planned stretched version of the L-1449.

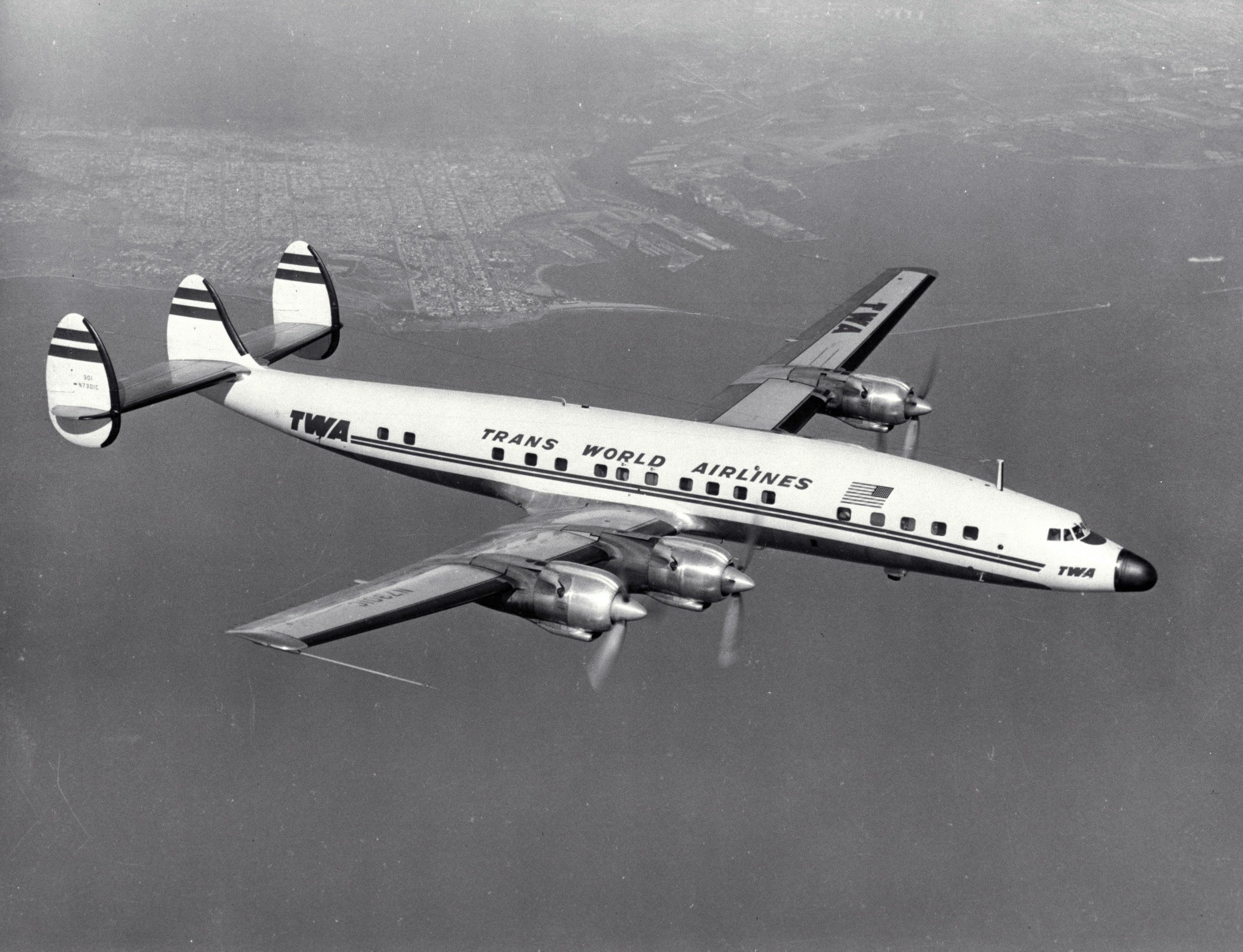
A TWA L-1649 Starliner

L-1649A Starliner
Production version, R-3350-988TC18EA-2 Turbo Cyclone engines with 3,400 hp (2,536 kW) each. Long-range passenger aircraft designed to compete with Douglas DC-7C. The standard radome for the weather radar extends total length by 2 ft 7 in (0.78 m) over L-1049 without radome. New thin-section wing with a straight taper, and much larger fuel capacity giving a ferry range of over 6,880 mi (11,080 km), first flight 10 October 1956. 44, including the prototype, were built.
L-1649B
Planned turboprop version of the L-1649A.
L-051
Original company designation for the XB-30 project.
L-084
The XW2V-1 was a planned radar version of the WV-2 with the Starliner's wings for the US Navy. It would have included four Allison T56-A8 engines and missiles for protection against attackers. Considerably different from its predecessors, given the production designation Lockheed L-084.

== Military designations ==
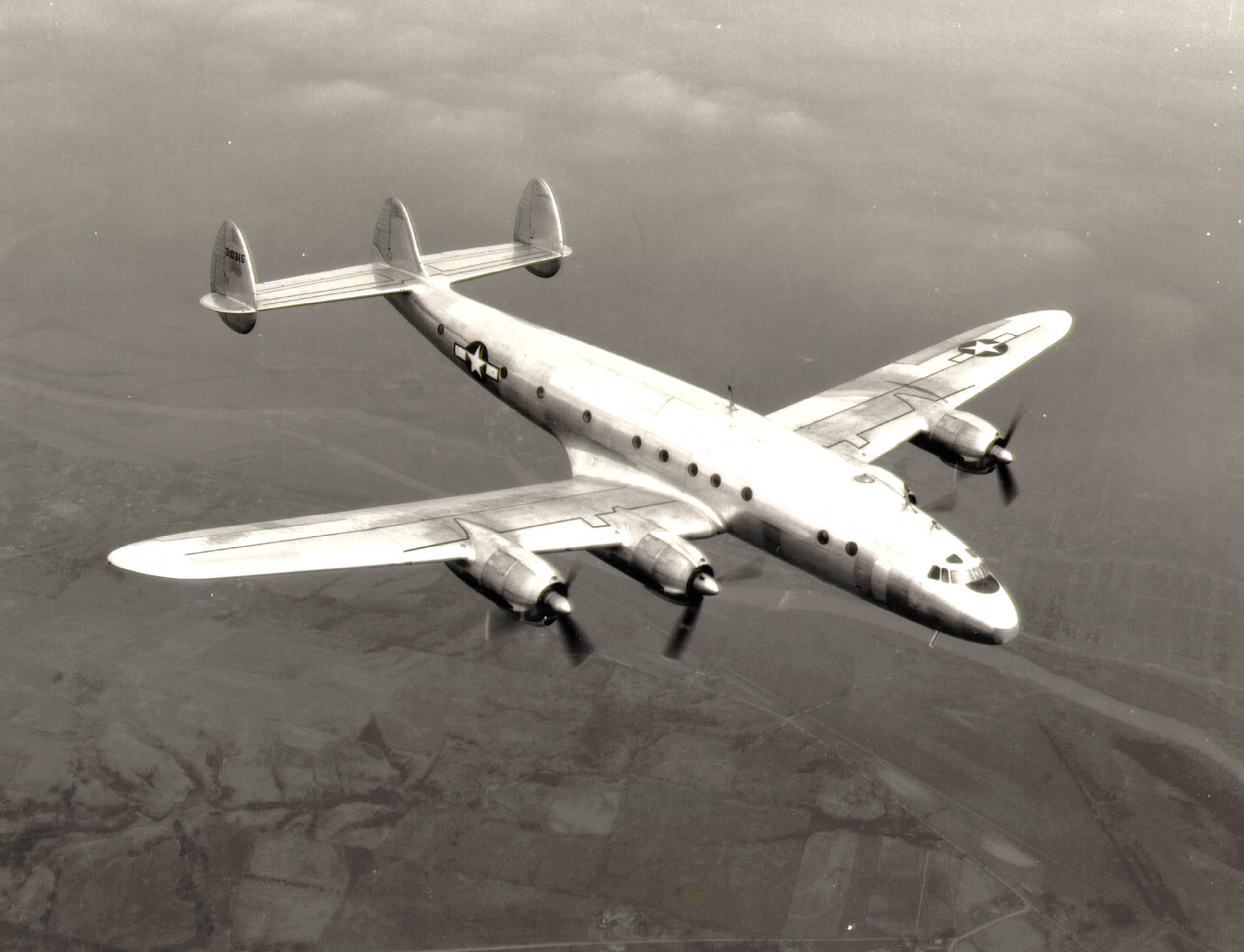
The original version of the C-69.

XB-30
Bomber version of the C-69. Was given model designation L-051 and later L-249.
XC-69
Designation for the prototype Constellation. One built. The C-69 was the original military transport version for the USAAF. All aircraft built during World War II were pressed into military service under this designation.
C-69
Original troop transport version. Almost all of this type were converted into L-049 airliners. 22 were built.
C-69A
Proposed long range troop version of the C-69.
C-69B
Proposed long range troop version of the C-69 designed to carry B-29 Superfortress engines to China. Was given model designation L-349.
C-69C-1
VIP transport aircraft, later designated ZC-69C-1. Only one aircraft was produced. Was given model designation L-549.
C-69D
Proposed VIP transport version.
XC-69E
Prototype XC-69 converted into an engine testbed. It was powered by 4 Pratt & Whitney R-2800 Double Wasp engines.

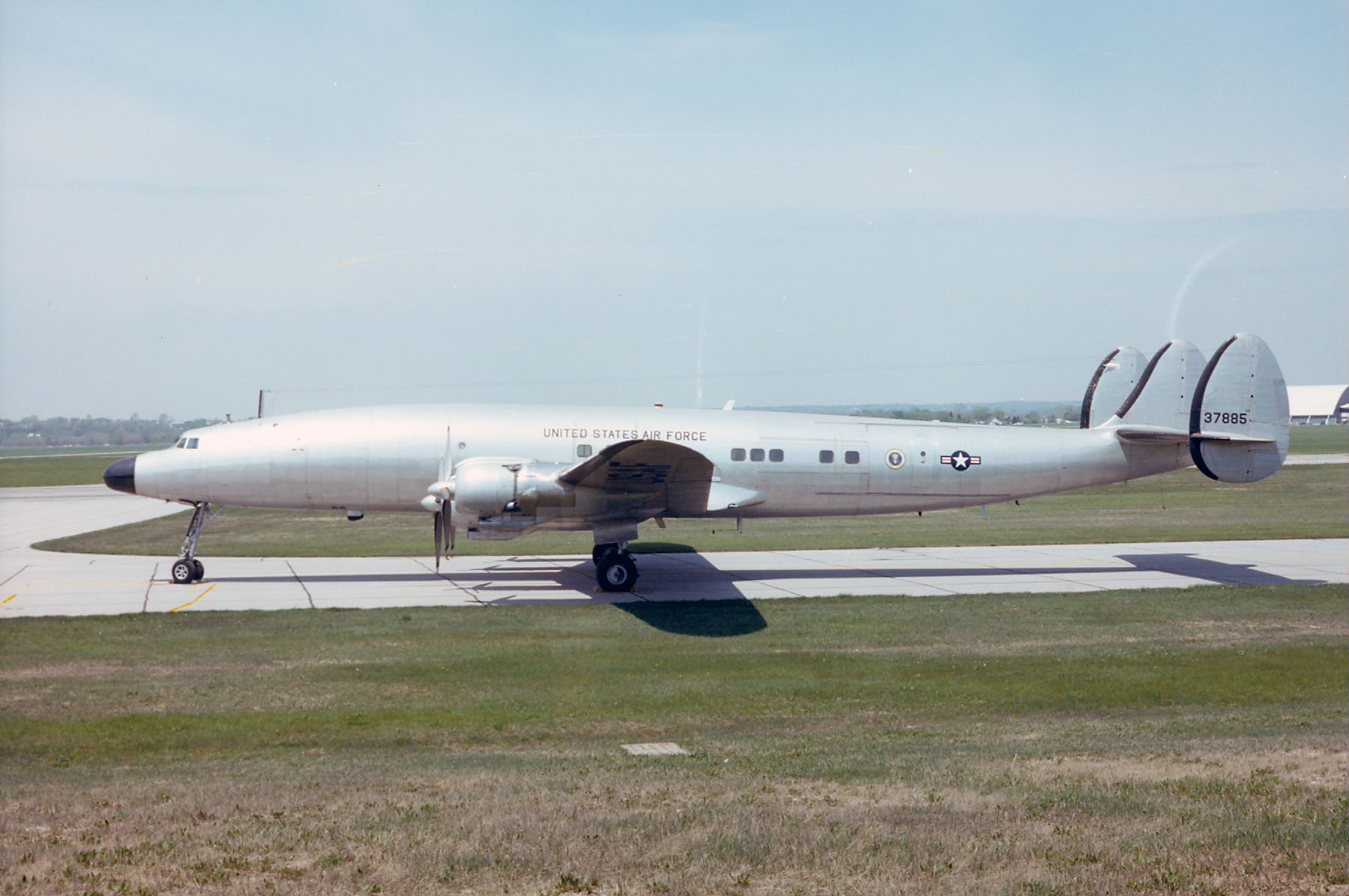
Two VC-121E Constellations, named Columbine II and Columbine III, were used by president Dwight Eisenhower.

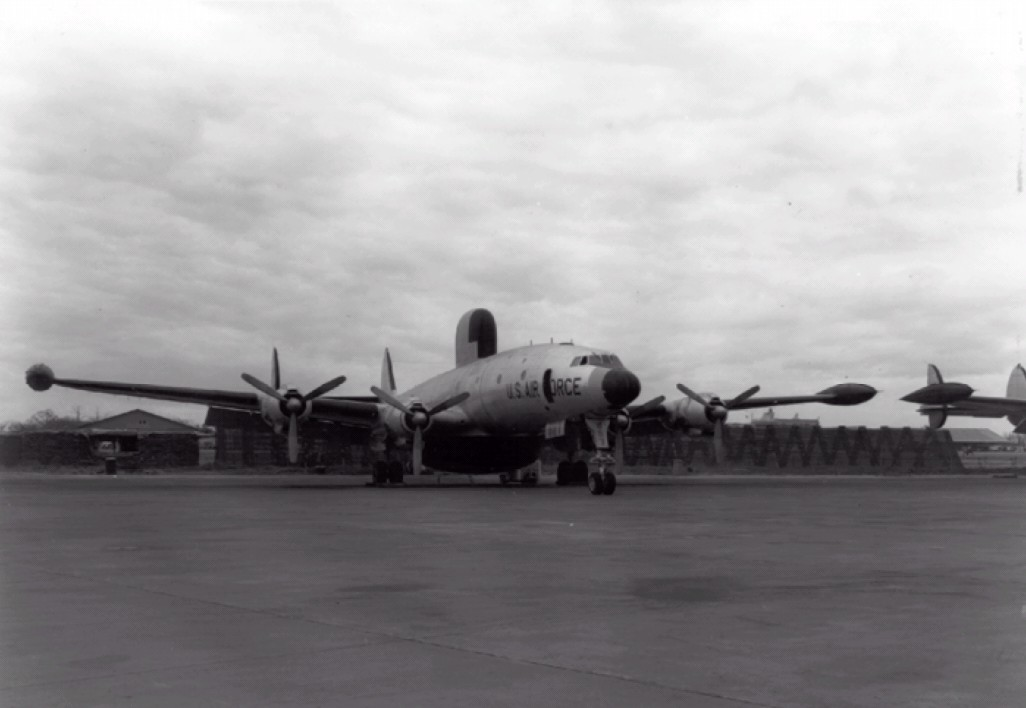
A "College Eye" EC-121D at Korat RTAFB.

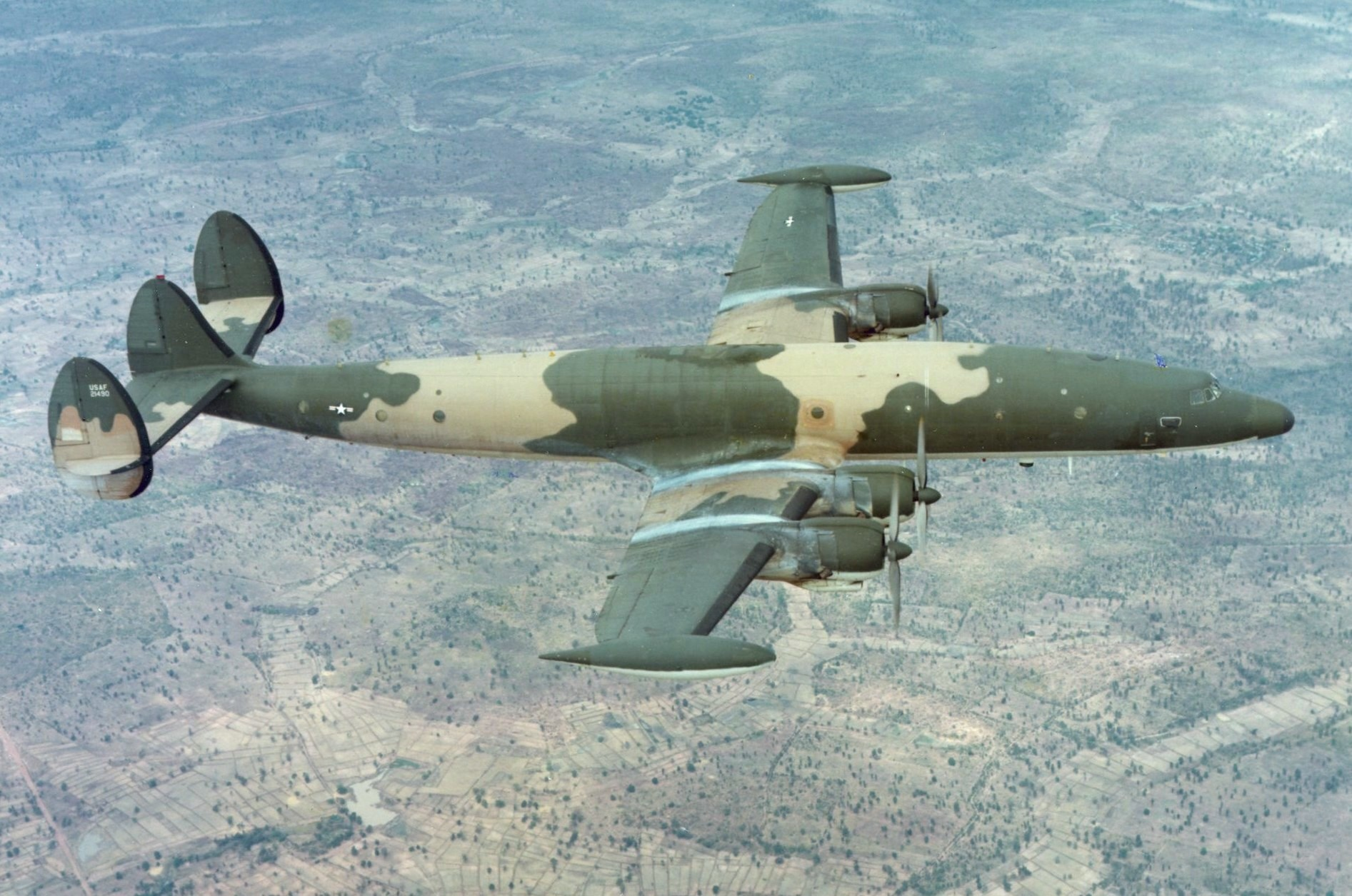
A "Batcat" EC-121R over Southeast Asia.

C-121A
The C-121 was the military transport version of improved L-749 introduced in 1948. Reinforced floor, cargo door in port rear fuselage
VC-121A
VIP transport aircraft, converted from the C-121A
VC-121B
VIP transport for use by the President of the United States of America
C-121C
R7V-1 with R-3350-34 engines with 3,400 hp (2,536 kW) each, based on L-1049
JC-121C
Two C-121C and one TC-121C used as avionics testbeds
NC-121C
One C-121C converted for permanent use as a testbed
RC-121C
USAF long-range airborne radar analogous to Navy's WV-2
TC-121C
Nine RC-121Cs Converted as AEW trainers, subsequently became EC-121C
VC-121C
VIP version of C-121C. Total 4.
EC-121D
Big Eye/College Eye/Disco early warning variant, originally designated RC-121D
NC-121D
WV-2 converted to observe high speed objects in the atmosphere nicknamed the "Tripple Nipple"
RC-121D
WV-2 with wingtip fuel tanks, later redesignated EC-121D
VC-121E
VIP transport for use by the President of the United States of America
YC-121F
Two prototype R7V-1 with Pratt & Whitney T34-P-6 turboprops with 6,000 shp (4,476 kW) each
C-121G
32 Navy R7V-1 delivered to USAF
TC-121G
Designation given to 9 C-121G converted into trainers
VC-121G
One C-121G given the role as a temporary VIP Transport
EC-121H
42 EC-121D with upgraded electronics

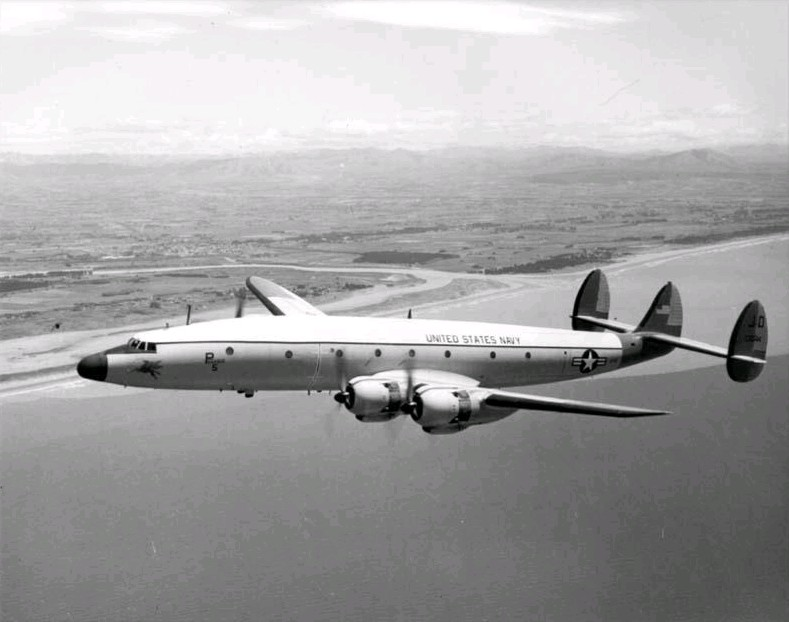
C-121J "Pegasus" in flight 1965. This aircraft crashed in Antarctica in 1970, thus giving its name to Pegasus Airfield

C-121J
Redesignated Navy R7V-1
EC-121J
2 EC-121D with upgraded electronics
NC-121J
7 C-121J modified to send television broadcasts to troops in Vietnam
VC-121J
4 C-121J converted for VIP use. One served with the Blue Angels.
EC-121K
Redesignated Navy WV-2 Warning Star
JC-121K
One EC-121K used as an avionics testbed
NC-121K
EC-121K used by the Navy
EC-121L
Redesignated Navy WV-2E
EC-121M
Redesignated Navy WV-2Q
WQC-121N
Redesignated Navy WV-3
EC-121P
EC-121K equipped for anti-submarine warfare
EC-121Q
EC-121D with upgraded electronics
EC-121R "BatCat"
EC-121K and EC-121P equipped to process signals from seismic instruments
NC-121S
Electronic warfare and reconnaissance version
EC-121T
Upgraded radar; One example is on display at Peterson Air and Space Museum, EC-121T photo.

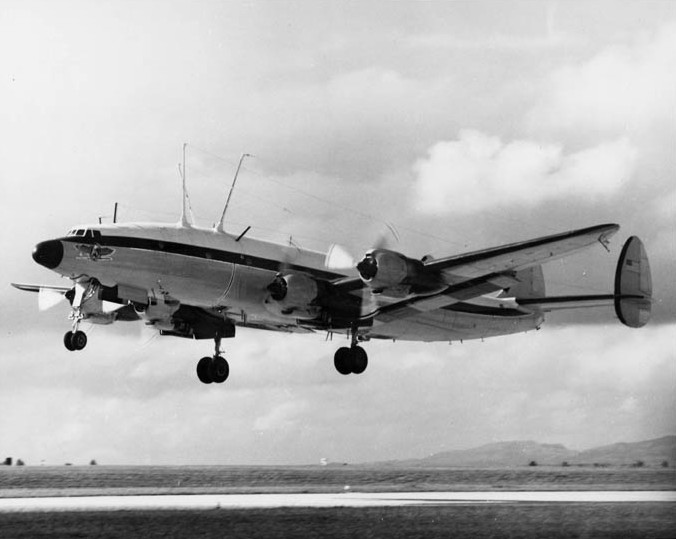
An NC-121J used in Vietnam.

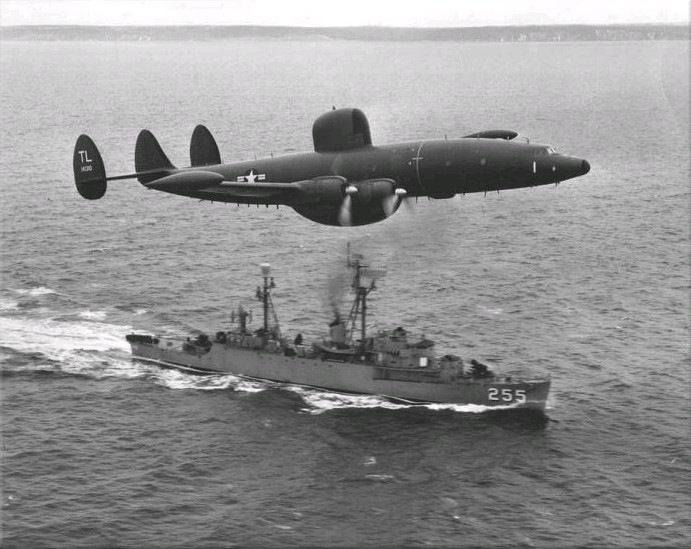
A WV-2 in 1957.

R7O-1
The original US Navy designation of the R7V-1 based on L-1049D, R-3350-91 engines with 3,250 hp (2,425 kW) each
R7V-1
Re-designation of the R7O-1. Later redesignated C-121J
R7V-1P
One R7V-1 modified for Arctic use
R7V-2
Four prototypes with Pratt & Whitney YT34-P-12A turboprops of 4,140 shp (3,088 kW) each. Two were delivered as YC-121F prototype aircraft (see above).
PO-1W
Two maritime patrol aircraft equipped with search radar based on L-749, later re-designated WV-1.
PO-2W Warning Star
Long-range airborne radar aircraft, R-3350-34 or R-3350-42 engines with 3,400 hp (2,536 kW) each, based on L-1049, later re-designated WV-2.
WV-1
Re-designation of the PO-1W.
WV-2 Warning Star
Re-designation of the PO-2W. Later re-designated EC-121K.
WV-2E
Experimental version of WV-2 modified to carry a rotating radar dome similar to that of the Boeing E-3 Sentry. Later redesignated EC-121L.
WV-2Q
WV-2 equipped for electronic warfare, later redesignated EC-121M.
WV-3
Eight aircraft equipped for weather reconnaissance. Later re-designated WQC-121N.
XW2V-1
The XW2V-1 was a planned radar version of the WV-2 with the Starliner's wings for the US Navy. It would have included four Allison T56-A8 engines and missiles for protection against attackers. Considerably different from its predecessors, given the production designation Lockheed L-084.

== Sources ==
- C-69/C-121 - US Warplanes.net
- Breffort, Dominique. Lockheed Constellation: from Excalibur to Starliner Civilian and Military Variants. Paris: Histoire and Collections, 2006. Print. ISBN 2-915239-62-2
