= Lockheed C-69 Constellation =

Early military version of the Constellation

C-69 Constellation
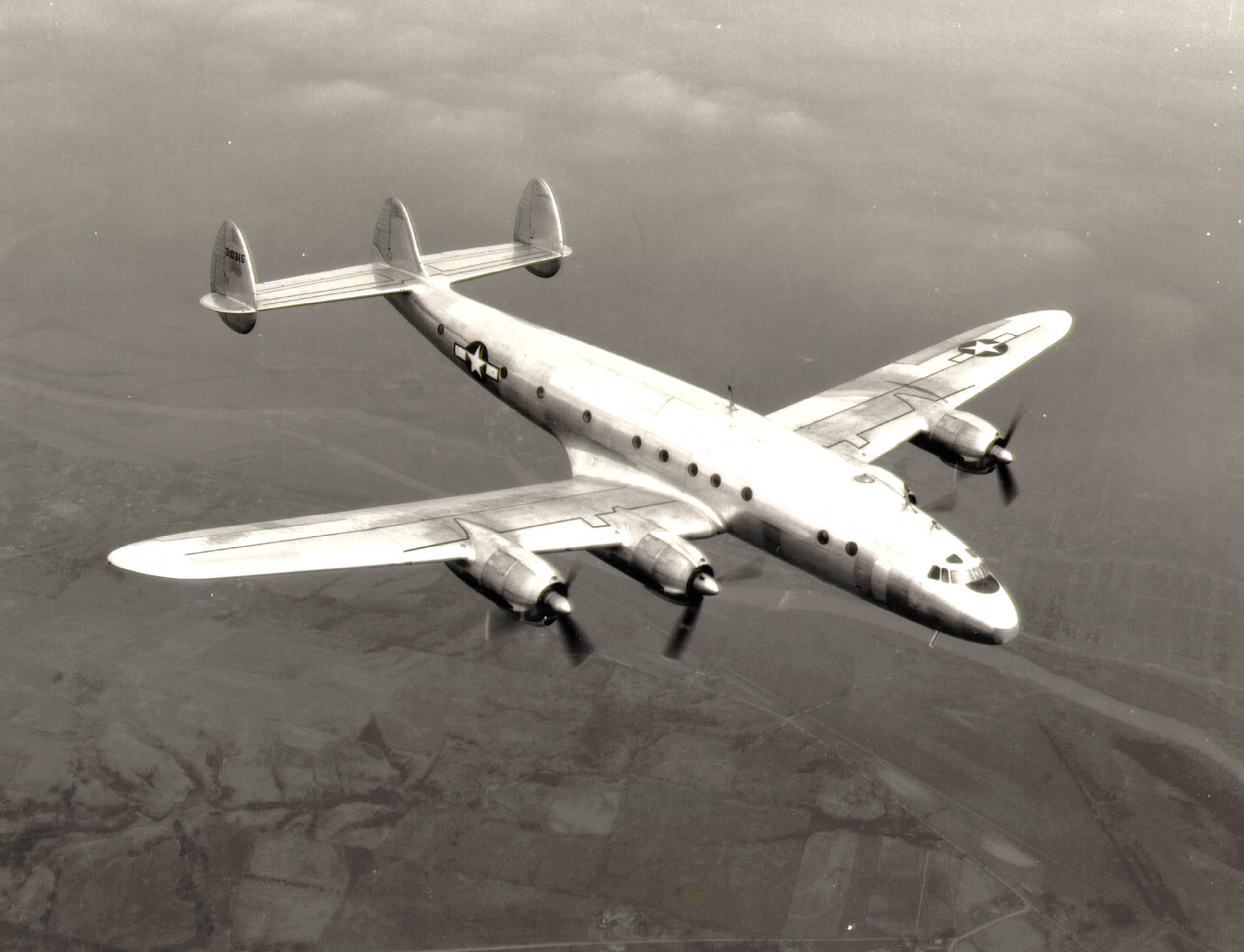
- A C-69 Constellation in flight

General information
- Type: Transport
- National origin: United States
- Manufacturer: Lockheed
- Designer: Kelly Johnson
- Status: Retired
- Primary user: United States Army Air Forces
- Number built: 22

History
- Manufactured: 1942–1945
- Introduction date: July 28, 1943
- First flight: January 9, 1943
- Retired: 1945 (except C-69C)
- Variant: L-049 Constellation

The Lockheed C-69 Constellation is a four-engined, propeller-driven military transport aircraft developed during World War II. It was co-developed with the Lockheed Constellation airliner.

It first flew in 1943, and production of the 22 constructed was shared between the United States Army Air Forces (15) and commercial carriers. Most of the C-69 aircraft built were later converted into civilian airliners under the designation Lockheed L-049 Constellation.

== Design and development ==
Following the Attack on Pearl Harbor and the United States entering World War II, the assembly lines at the Lockheed were taken over by the American government for the war effort. Along with the assembly lines, the Lockheed L-049 Constellation airliner was also requisitioned and redesignated C-69 and was to be used as an equipment and personnel transport by the United States Army Air Forces (USAAF). In February 1942, the 80 L-049/L-149 Constellations ordered by Transcontinental & Western Air and Pan American World Airways were also requisitioned. The 50 L-049s both airlines had on order were to be redesignated C-69 and C-69A, respectively, and used as troop transport aircraft. The 30 L-149 aircraft Pan Am had on order were replaced by the similar model L-349 (difference being the cargo door on the upper left hand side of the aircraft and the ability to carry cargo) and designated C-69B. Another 180 C-69B aircraft were ordered increasing the figure to 210. Due to the direction the war was heading during summer 1942, the need for a large troop transport capable of crossing the Atlantic Ocean or Pacific Ocean (by flying from island to island) became more important. This would help avoid the risks the convoys in the Atlantic were facing due to U-boat attacks. The Douglas C-54 Skymaster planned for these roles wasn't completely capable. So on September 29, 1942, the United States Department of War signed contract W535 AC-26610. With this contract, the nine L-049 aircraft under construction for TWA were purchased and 150 more C-69A and C-69B aircraft were ordered along with C-69C (L-549) and C-69D VIP transport versions. In reality, only one C-69C was produced out of all these planned variants.

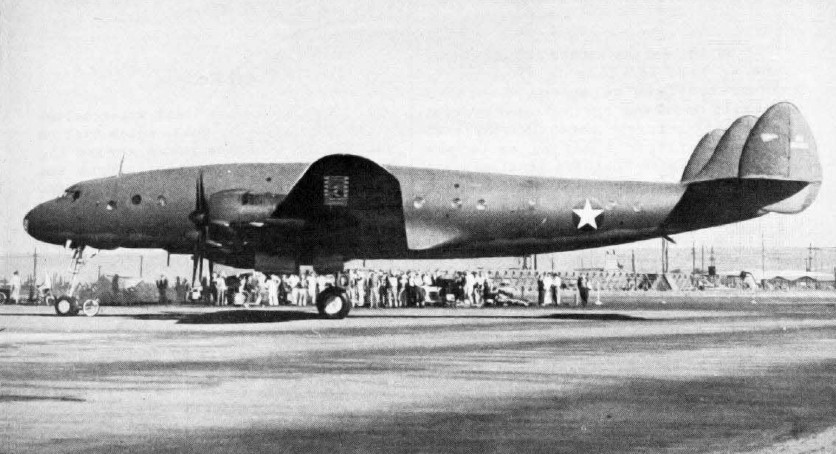
The prototype XC-69, registered NX25600, c. 1943.

Around the same time the decision regarding contract W535 AC-26610 was made, the prototype XC-69 was completed and rolled out in December 1942. The aircraft was painted in olive green and grey camouflage colors and the civilian registration NX25600 along with Lockheed's logo being painted on the nose of the aircraft for promotional reasons; construction of the aircraft at Lockheed's Engineering Experimental Shop had been kept a secret. However, problems developed with the aircraft's powerplant, the Wright R-3350 Duplex-Cyclone. A consideration to replace the R-3350 engines with Pratt & Whitney R-2800 had been taken up. This led to a new version designated XC-69E, but the project was eventually abandoned.

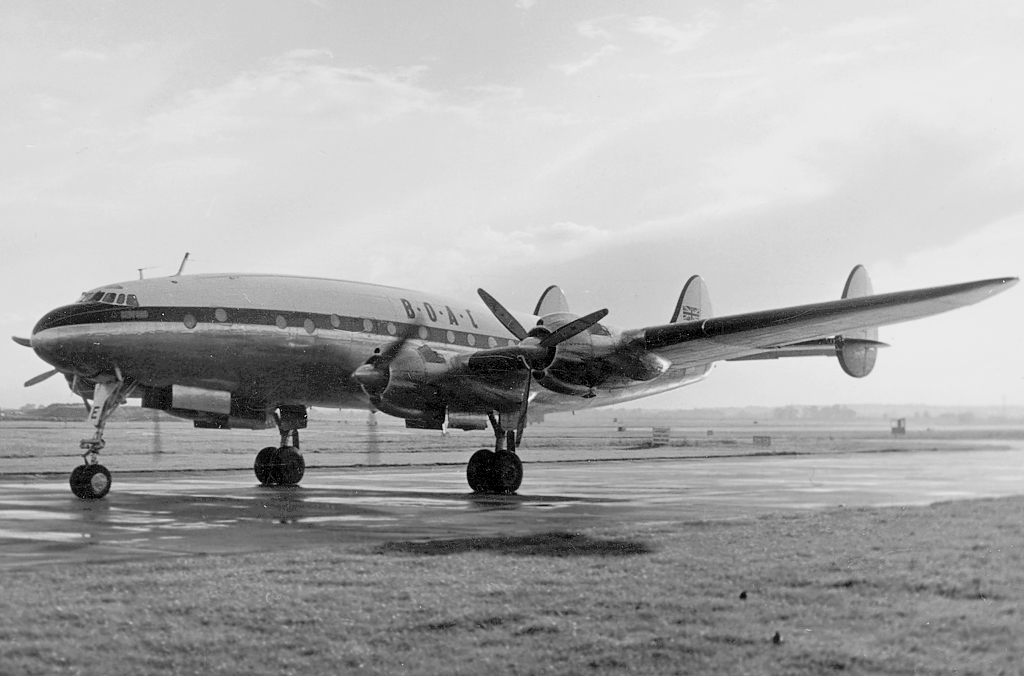
The sole C-69C after civilianization for BOAC as an L049E at London Heathrow in 1954

On January 9, 1943, after the last inspections had been carried out by the USAAF and Lockheed, the XC-69 finally took to the skies. For the occasion, Lockheed had borrowed the Boeing Aircraft Company's chief test pilot, Edmund Allen. Allen was one of a small number of pilots to have experience with the R-3350 and was the test pilot for the Boeing B-29 Superfortress bomber, the role for which the R-3350 was originally developed. Lockheed test pilot Milo Burcham, who was known for flying the prototype Lockheed P-38 Lightning, acted as co-pilot during the flight. Both Allen and Burcham traded control of the aircraft during the entire experience. Both designers, Kelly Johnson and R.L. Thoren were also present on the flight (the latter acting as the flight engineer). The aircraft landed at Muroc Dry Lake (presently Edwards Air Force Base) and conducted four successful take-offs and landings. Burcham flew the XC-69 back to Burbank in 31 minutes. In total, the XC-69 performed six separate flights all adding up to 129 minutes. Two aircraft, a Boeing B-17 Flying Fortress and a Lockheed L-18 Lodestar acted as photo chase aircraft. After the experience Allen commented, "This machine works so well that you don't need me anymore!" Allen returned to Boeing. A seventh flight took place on January 18. This time, the landing gear doors were placed on the aircraft so the gear could be retracted (this was not done earlier to avoid any landing gear failure). On July 28, 1943, the XC-69 was symbolically handed over to the USAAF at Las Vegas, Nevada and given a military serial number 43-10309. Later that same day, the XC-69 returned to Lockheed for further testing. The C-69 was able to attain a higher maximum speed than the Japanese Mitsubishi A6M Zero fighter.

Major problems, however, surfaced with the R-3350 powerplant that powered the C-69, when an XB-29 test aircraft crashed into a Boeing factory. The accident killed 14 factory workers, Edmund Allen, and the rest of Allen's test crew. The cause was due to one of the aircraft's R-3350 engines catching fire and burning through the wing of the aircraft causing it to fail and dooming the XB-29. All aircraft fitted with the R-3350, including the C-69, were grounded until the investigation of the engine's failure was concluded. The conclusion led to a recommendation to replace the existing carburetors with more reliable ones. With that, testing resumed after June 18, 1943. A fuel leakage problem was discovered with the C-69 and wasn't solved until April 1944 when a new method of sealing the fuel tanks surfaced. More overheating, fire and other troubles continued with the R-3350 engines. This happened to the point where Lockheed started to doubt the abilities of the engine's manufacturer, Curtiss-Wright. Lockheed suggested to the USAAF that the C-69's engines be replaced by more reliable R-2800 radial engines. Instead, the USAAF ceased production of the R-3350 until the troubles that plagued the engines were solved. This caused the development of the C-69 to slow down and furthermore, the C-69 was not declared a priority. Lockheed continued to focus on building combat aircraft while the C-54 Skymaster, the C-69's competitor was already flying and officially ordered.

The second production C-69 had first flown in August 1943. Lockheed had hoped to produce four C-69 aircraft by the end of 1943, but due to the low importance of the C-69 to the USAAF, this didn't occur. On April 16, 1944, Howard Hughes, one of the key people in the Constellation's development, and owner of TWA, flew the aircraft from Burbank to Washington D.C. in less than seven hours at 346 mph (557 km/h) at 65% engine power on a publicity stunt. This was done on the condition that the aircraft be delivered to the USAAF when it got to Washington. The aircraft was painted in full TWA livery while still retaining its military serial number. Also present on the flight was TWA president Jack Frye (who flew the first part of the journey and later handed the controls over to Hughes), and actress Ava Gardner, who was Hughes' girlfriend at the time. The other C-69 aircraft were used for different trials such as the seventh C-69 being flown to Fairbanks, Alaska for testing in Arctic conditions. During one flight, the XC-69 arrived at Wright Field and picked up famous aviator Orville Wright, on what would be his last flight in an aircraft. Wright was allowed to control the aircraft momentarily during the flight. He even commented that the wingspan was greater than that of his first flight. The third C-69 was sent on a flight between New York City and Paris on August 14, 1945 which showed its capability to cross the Atlantic. The test flight took less than 15 hours and was flown by a TWA crew.

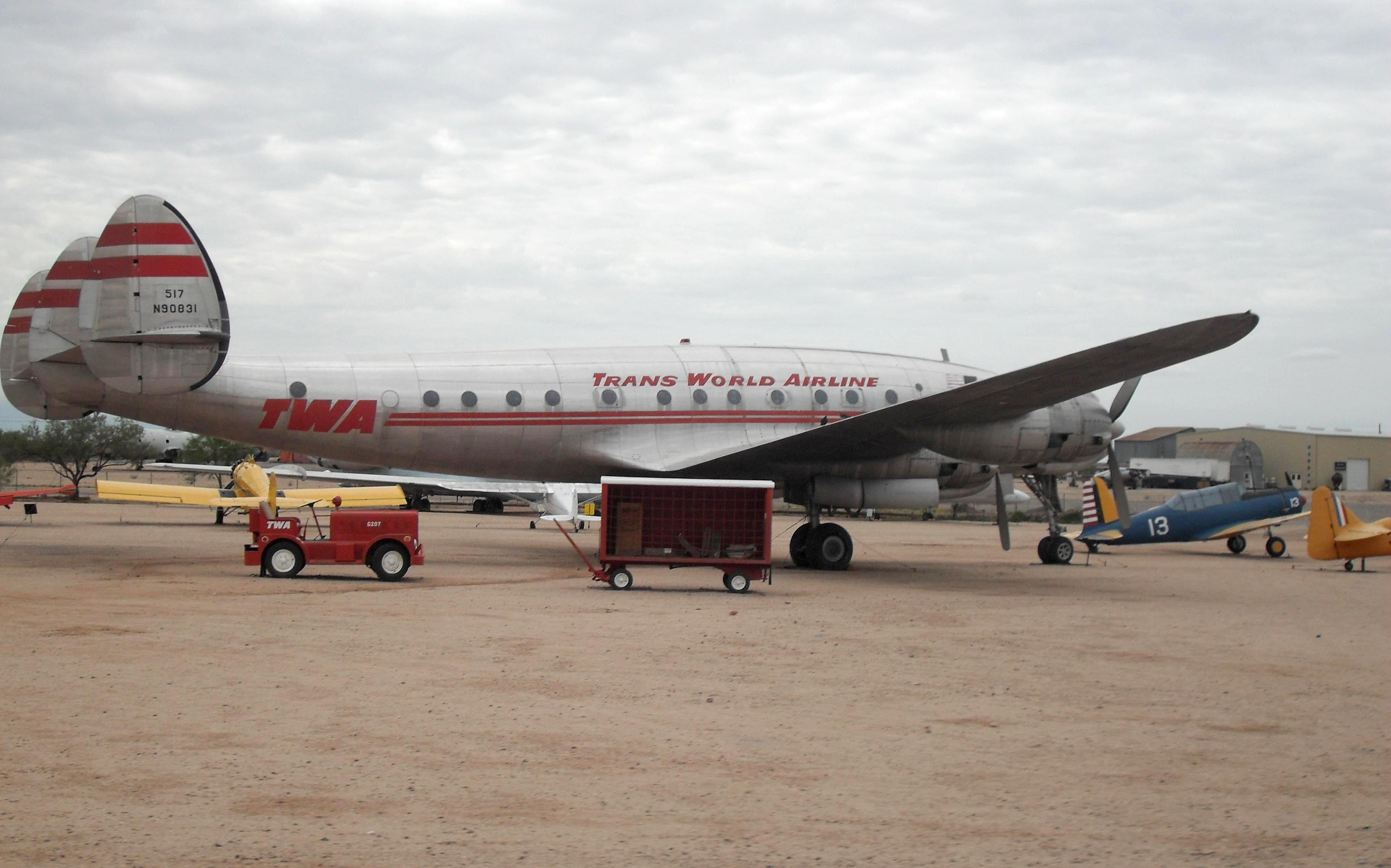
The last surviving C-69 in the colors of Trans World Airlines on display at the Pima Air and Space Museum.

Unfortunately for Lockheed, the C-69 became less important to the war effort as time progressed, especially since the tide of the war had turned in favor of the Allies. Only a small number of C-69 aircraft would see service in the last year of the war. Even so, Lockheed was able to conduct tests at the expense of the government to solve problems with the aircraft's design. Although the problems with the R-3350 were being solved, the B-29 had priority for the engines over the C-69. Even with all the effort put forth by Lockheed, the USAAF favored the C-54 Skymaster over the C-69. At the end of the war, only 22 C-69s were produced (seven of which were never delivered). Except for the C-69C, all other C-69s were declared surplus and sold on the civilian market between 1946 and 1947. These would later be converted by Lockheed into L-049 passenger aircraft for airline usage. The prototype XC-69 was converted into the sole XC-69E, which Lockheed used to test the possibility of using the Pratt and Whitney R-2800 engine in place of the Wright R-3350. This never happened. The XC-69E prototype was later sold to the Hughes Tool Company for there uses, only to be bought back by Lockheed who stretched it, and converted it into the prototype L-1049 Super Constellation. Today, only one former C-69 is still in existence. It is on display at the Pima Air and Space Museum, painted in full TWA livery.

== Variants ==
Variant	Built
XC-69	1
C-69-1-LO	16
C-69-5-LO	4
C-69C-1-LO	1

XC-69
Unpressurized prototype version. One built.
C-69
Initial troop transport version. 13 built. Seven others were under construction, but converted to L-049 airliners while still on the assembly line.
C-69A
Troop transport with a different internal layout than the C-69. None built
C-69B
Long range troop and cargo transport with a cargo door on the left. None built. Company designation L-349.
C-69C
VIP transport version based on the initial C-69. One built. Company designation L-549.
C-69D
VIP transport with different engines with extra oil and fuel tanks. None built.
XC-69E
Prototype XC-69 converted to use four Pratt & Whitney R-2800 radial engines in place of the original R-3350 for testing purposes.

== Specifications (C-69) ==
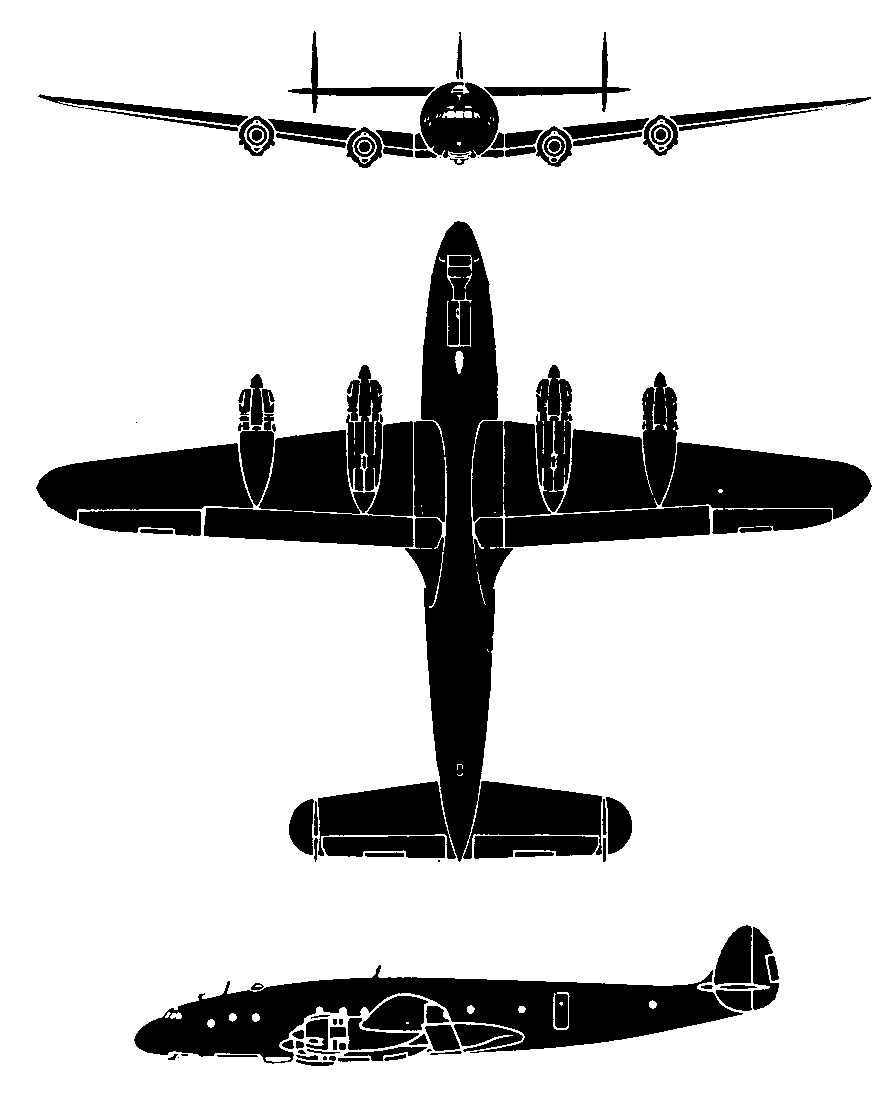

Data from Lockheed Constellation:From Excalibur to Starliner and Dave's Warbirds.com

General characteristics

- Crew: 4
- Length: 95 ft 2 in (29.01 m)
- Wingspan: 123 ft (37 m)
- Height: 22 ft 5 in (6.83 m)
- Wing area: 1,650 sq ft (153 m^{2})
- Airfoil: root: NACA 23018; tip: NACA 4412
- Empty weight: 50,000 lb (22,680 kg)
- Max takeoff weight: 72,000 lb (32,659 kg)
- Powerplant: 4 × Wright R-3350-35 Duplex-Cyclone 18-cylinder air-cooled radial piston engines, 2,200 hp (1,600 kW) each
- Propellers: 3-bladed constant-speed propellers

Performance

- Maximum speed: 330 mph (530 km/h, 290 kn) at 10,000 ft (3,048 m)
- Cruise speed: 227 mph (365 km/h, 197 kn)
- Range: 2,400 mi (3,900 km, 2,100 nmi)
- Service ceiling: 25,030 ft (7,630 m)

== See also ==
Related development

- Lockheed Constellation
- Lockheed L-049 Constellation
- Lockheed L-649 Constellation
- Lockheed L-749 Constellation
- Lockheed L-1049 Super Constellation
- Lockheed C-121/R7V Constellation
- Lockheed L-1249 Super Constellation (YC-121F/R7V-2)
- Lockheed EC-121 Warning Star
- Lockheed L-1649 Starliner

Aircraft of comparable role, configuration, and era

- Boeing B-29 Superfortress
- Boeing 377 Stratocruiser
- Bristol Britannia
- Douglas DC-4/C-54 Skymaster
- Douglas DC-6/C-118 Liftmaster
- Douglas DC-7
- Ilyushin Il-18
- Lockheed L-188 Electra
- Republic XF-12 Rainbow
- Vickers Viscount

Related lists

- List of Lockheed aircraft
- List of models of the Lockheed Constellation
- List of Lockheed Constellation operators
