= Lockheed L-1249 Super Constellation =

Experimental four-engine turboprop military transport

L-1249 Super Constellation R7V-2/YC-121F Constellation
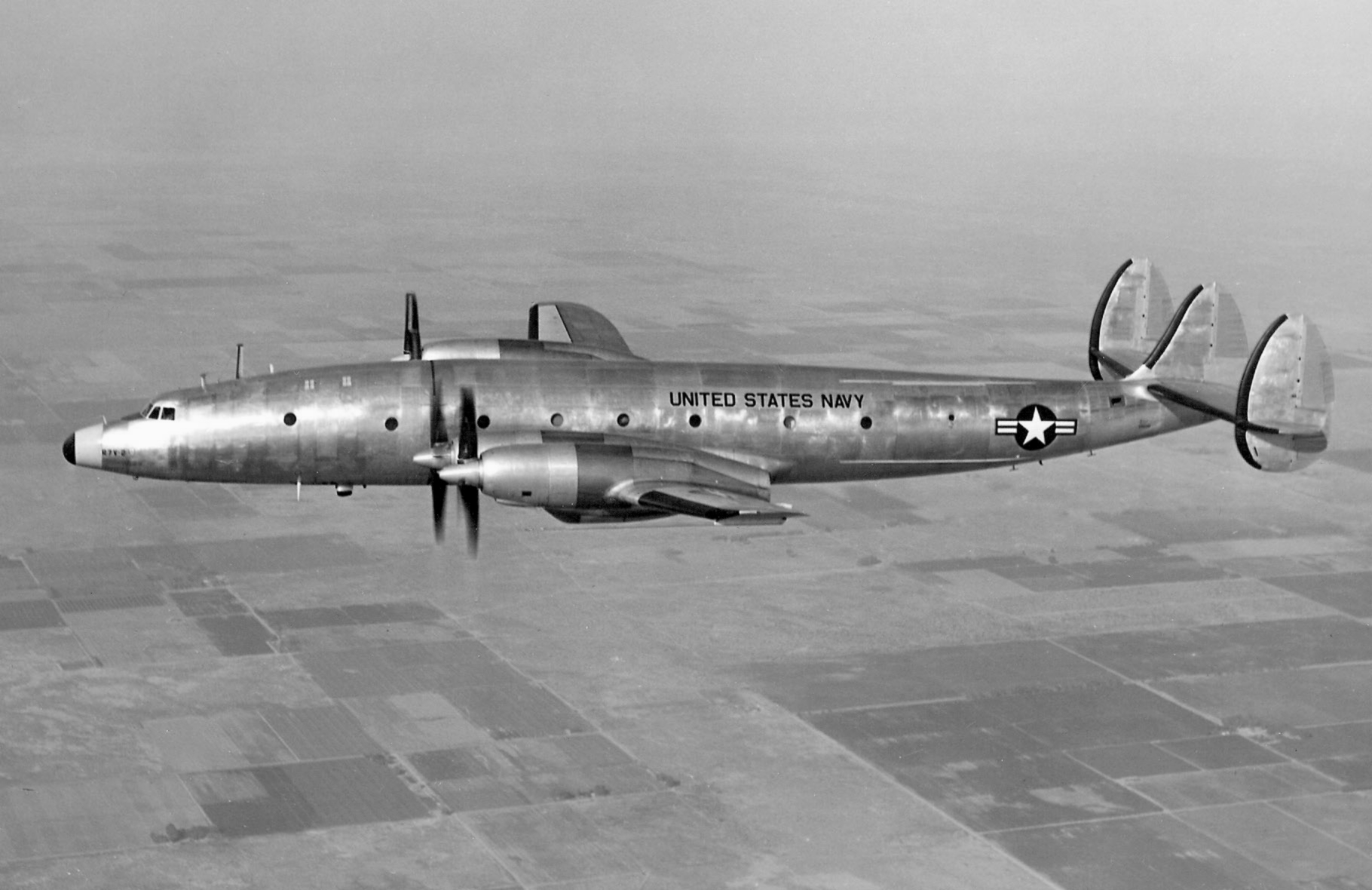
- Lockheed R7V-2

General information
- Type: Experimental military transport
- National origin: United States
- Manufacturer: Lockheed
- Designer: Clarence "Kelly" Johnson
- Status: Retired
- Primary user: United States Navy; United States Air Force
- Number built: 4

History
- Manufactured: 1954 and 1955 respectively
- Introduction date: 10 September 1954 (Navy); July 1955 (Air Force)
- First flight: 1 September 1954
- Developed from: C-121 Constellation; L-1049 Super Constellation

The Lockheed L-1249 Super Constellation was a turboprop-powered version of the Lockheed Constellation aircraft family. Built in 1954 and 1955, the aircraft were used as prototypes for possible future military transport aircraft for both the United States Air Force and United States Navy. Both aircraft saw very short lives, and the airframes were later used to build L-1049 Super Constellations.

== Design and development ==
On 18 August 1950, the United States Navy signed a contract for 11 military transport versions of the Lockheed L-1049. The aircraft were to have been convertible troop/cargo transports, based on the model L-1049B (which was already being constructed as the PO-2W Warning Star). The R7O-1 would have also featured round portholes in place of the rectangular ones on Air Force C-121C Constellations. The aircraft entered evaluation service in the Navy's oldest test squadron, VX-1, based in Patuxent River, Maryland.

In November 1951, an idea came about to build a turbine-powered version of the R7O-1. This new aircraft was designated L-1249A by Lockheed. In 1954, two R7O-1s (then designated R7V-1) were pulled off the assembly line for conversion into prototypes for the new L-1249A. The landing gear was strengthened along with the fuselage and wings of the aircraft. Extra fuel tanks were also added on the wingtips of the two aircraft, increasing the fuel capacity to 7,360 US gal (27,900 L; 6,130 imp gal). The wings were also shortened from 123 ft (37 m) to 117 ft 7 in (35.8 m). Finally, four Pratt & Whitney YT34-P-12A turboprop engines, rated at 5,500 bhp (4,100 kW) each, were installed in place of the usual Wright R-3350 Duplex-Cyclone radial engines. The new aircraft was designated R7V-2, and first flew on 1 September 1954. The R7V-2 reached 412 mph (358 kn; 663 km/h) making it the fastest transport aircraft in the world at the time. The two R7V-2 aircraft were delivered to the Navy on 10 September the same year.

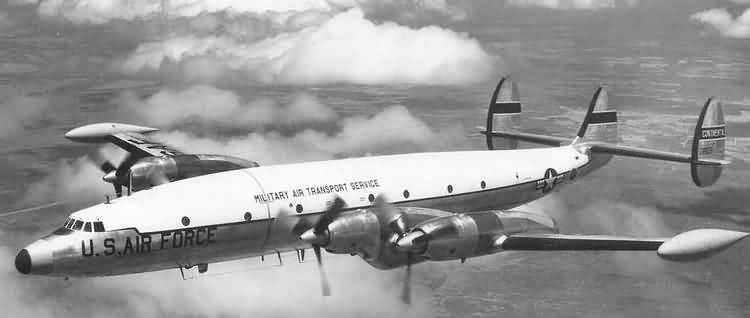
The second YC-121F in flight.

In 1953, the United States Air Force became interested in the L-1249A project. Two R7V-1 aircraft were again taken off the production lines in 1955 and converted to L-1249A standards. These aircraft, designated YC-121F, were identical to the R7V-2s in service with the Navy. The YC-121F was able to carry a crew of four and 87-106 passengers, depending on the conditions of the flight (transoceanic and overland). Lockheed also had a planned medical evacuation version, able to carry 73 Stretcher cases and a crew of 15. The R7V-2 and YC-121F both had a cabin similar to the R7V-1 and C-121C. The first YC-121F flew on 5 April 1955 and was delivered to the Air Force in July 1955. The aircraft were put into service with the Test Squadron of the 1700th Air Transport Group of the Military Air Transport Service, based at Kelly Air Force Base, Texas. Other aircraft in the Squadron included the YC-97J Stratofreighter and YC-124B Globemaster II, both also powered by T34 engines. After undergoing brief testing, the YC-121F was used on a regular basis for transportation flights. On one occasion, Lockheed test pilot Roy Wimmer managed to reach a top speed of 479 mph (416 kn; 771 km/h) in the YC-121F during a 20 degree dive. On 25 January 1957, a new transcontinental record for propeller aircraft was set by a YC-121F which flew from Long Beach to Andrews AFB, Maryland, in four hours and 43 minutes.

Lockheed proposed an airliner version of the L-1249A, designated L-1249B. This would have had the fuselage of the L-1049E and be equipped with extra fuel tanks on the wingtips as well as four 5,500 hp (4,100 kW) Pratt & Whitney PT-2F1 turboprops (the planned civilian version of the YT34). This would have allowed the L-1249B to fly from London to Moscow in seven hours, from Honolulu to the U.S. west coast in six hours, or London to New York City via Gander, Newfoundland in nine hours. The L-1249B was to have had a top speed of 415 mph (361 kn; 668 km/h) and a range of at least 4,125 miles (6,639 km). In the end, airlines were still in favor of the piston engined airliners, so no L-1249B was ever constructed.

Only four aircraft were built, as the T34 was found to be complex and only used on large aircraft such as the 50 examples of the Douglas C-133 Cargomaster. When the L-1249A finished service with both the Navy and Air Force, the four existing airframes were used to build civilian L-1049 Super Constellations. For example, the two YC-121F fuselages were attached to the wings engines and tails of two used L-1049G aircraft to make two L-1049H freighters for the Flying Tiger Line. One R7V-2, before being scrapped, was used for testing the Allison 501D turboprops for the development of the Lockheed L-188 Electra (earning the nickname "Elation" during testing).

== Variants ==
=== Military ===
R7V-2
Originally designated R7O-2. Four converted R7V-1 aircraft (BuNos 131630-131631, 131660-131661) with a shorter wingspan and powered by four Pratt & Whitney YT34-P12A turboprop engines. Used by the United States Navy.
YC-121F
Two R7V-2 aircraft transferred to and used by the United States Air Force and powered by four T34-P-6 turboprops.

=== Civilian ===
L-1249A
Company designation for the R7V-2 and YC-121F.
L-1249B
Planned airliner based on the L-1249A, with an L-1049E based fuselage and Pratt & Whitney PT2F-1 turboprops (civilian version of the YT34). None built.

== Specifications (YC-121F) ==
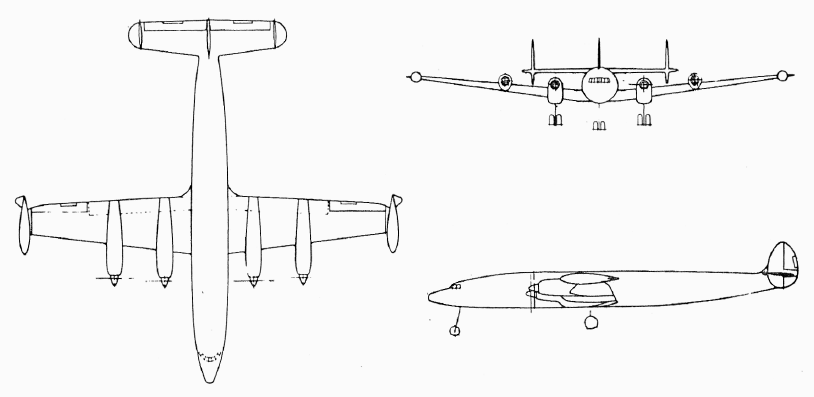
L-1249A Super Constellation

Data from Lockheed Constellation: from Excalibur to Starliner Civilian and Military Variants, YC-121F Charactaristics Summary

General characteristics

- Crew: 4-15
- Capacity: 87-106 Passengers (Passenger configuration) / 73 Stretcher Cases (Medical configuration) / 24,210 lb (10,981 kg) payload
- Length: 116 ft 2 in (35.41 m)
- Wingspan: 117 ft 7 in (35.84 m) without tip-tanks

119 ft (36 m) with tip-tanks

- Height: 25 ft 6 in (7.77 m)
- Wing area: 1,615 sq ft (150.0 m^{2})
- Airfoil: root: NACA 23018; tip: NACA 4412
- Empty weight: 50,999 lb (23,133 kg)
- Max takeoff weight: 136,000 lb (61,689 kg)
- Powerplant: 4 × Pratt & Whitney T34-P-6 turboprop engines, 5,531 shp (4,124 kW) each
- Propellers: 3-bladed Hamilton Standard Hydromatic, 15 ft 0 in (4.57 m) diameter constant-speed feathering propellers

Performance

- Maximum speed: 479 mph (771 km/h, 416 kn)
- Cruise speed: 430 mph (690 km/h, 370 kn)
- Stall speed: 117 mph (188 km/h, 102 kn)
- Combat range: 1,150 mi (1,850 km, 1,000 nmi) at 24,210 lb (10,981 kg) payload
- Service ceiling: 26,400 ft (8,000 m) at MTOW

32,900 ft (10,028 m) at combat weight with maximum power

- Rate of climb: 2,310 ft/min (11.7 m/s) at MTOW

4,600 ft/min (23.37 m/s) at combat weight with maximum power

== See also ==
Related development

- Lockheed Constellation
- Lockheed L-049 Constellation
- Lockheed C-69 Constellation
- Lockheed L-649 Constellation
- Lockheed L-749 Constellation
- Lockheed L-1049 Super Constellation
- Lockheed C-121 Constellation
- Lockheed EC-121 Warning Star
- Lockheed L-1649 Starliner

Aircraft of comparable role, configuration, and era

- Boeing YC-97J Stratofreighter
- Bristol Britannia C.1/C.2 (Series 250)
- Douglas DC-7D
- Douglas YC-124B Globemaster II
- Douglas C-133 Cargomaster
- Lockheed L-188 Electra
- Lockheed P-3 Orion

Related lists

- List of Lockheed aircraft
- List of Lockheed Constellation operators
