= Lockheed L-1649 Starliner =

US airliner with 4 piston engines, 1956

L-1649 Starliner
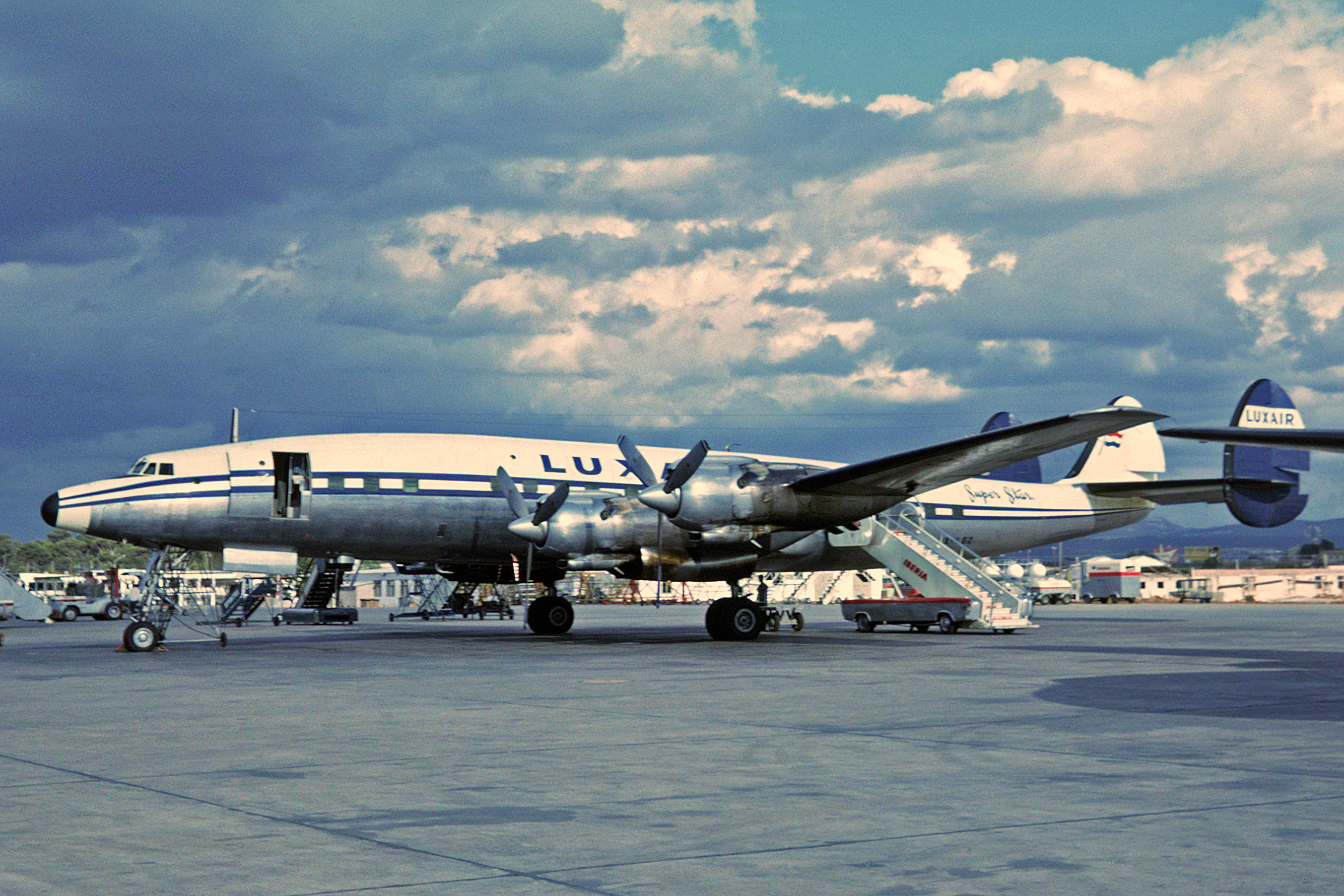
- A Luxair L-1649A Starliner at Palma de Mallorca Airport.

General information
- Type: Airliner
- National origin: United States
- Manufacturer: Lockheed
- Designer: Clarence "Kelly" Johnson
- Status: Retired
- Primary users: Trans World Airlines, Lufthansa, Air France
- Number built: 44 (Including prototype)

History
- Manufactured: 1956–1958
- Introduction date: June 1, 1957
- First flight: October 10, 1956
- Retired: Early 1980s
- Developed from: L-1049 Super Constellation

The Lockheed L-1649 Starliner is the last model of the Lockheed Constellation line of airliners. Powered by four Wright R-3350 Turbo-compound engines, it was built at Lockheed's Burbank, California plant from 1956 to 1958.

== Design and development ==
Development of the Starliner began when Lockheed designed the L-1449 in response to the Douglas DC-7C Seven Seas. Powered by four 5500 hp Pratt & Whitney PT2G-3 turboprop engines, the L-1449 would have cruised faster than the DC-7C with comparable range with 10,200 US gal (8,493 imp gal; 38,611 L) of fuel in a new 150 ft (46 m) wing. Pratt & Whitney dropped the PT2 project in March 1955 due to expected unreliability, high specific fuel consumption and high operating costs, though the T34 military version of the engine powered the Douglas C-133 freighter, which was also plagued with unreliability.

The L-1449 would have been about 55 in (140 cm) longer than the L-1049 series with a maximum gross takeoff weight (MGTOW) of 175,000 lb (79,000 kg). The L-1549 replaced the 1449 in early 1955, with an additional 40 in (100 cm) stretch and MGTOW of 187,500 lb (85,000 kg), presumably still with the PT2 turboprops.

Lockheed told Trans World Airlines (TWA) on 30 September 1954 the L-1449 would use the same fuselage as the 1049 series; Hughes Tool Company ordered 25 in December, though TWA estimated the L-1449 would lose money, even with every seat occupied. When P&W dropped their engine, Lockheed proposed an L-1549 with Allison turboprops, but TWA and Lockheed agreed on the piston-engine L-1649 instead, and so amended the L-1449 contract. In April 1955 Lockheed told TWA that they wanted to drop the 1649, but Hughes refused to agree.

Though the L-1449 and L-1549 were never built, all Constellations from 1954 onwards were strengthened to take the thrust generated by the T34/PT-2 turboprops, which were fitted to several R7V-2 Constellations for the United States Navy (USN).

With the abandonment of the L-1549, Lockheed designed a less ambitious upgrade of the Constellation series as the L-1649A Starliner. The new design used the L-1049G fuselage, the new 150 ft (46 m) wing and four Wright R-3350 988 TC18-EA-2 turbocompound radial engines, allowing the Starliner to fly nonstop from California to Europe. Lockheed said the new L-1649A would deliver 58 passengers over a range of 6,500 mi (10,500 km) at 350 mph (560 km/h), or from Paris to New York City three hours faster than the DC-7C. In January 1958 Pan American scheduled the DC-7C from Orly to Idlewild in 14 hr 15 min; TWA scheduled the 1649 in 14 hr 50 min.

== Operational history ==
The L-1649A prototype first flew on October 11, 1956. (The prototype [N1649] was the property of Lockheed until the early 1970s when it was sold in Japan.) Airline service began on June 1, 1957 on a Trans World Airlines (TWA) flight from New York to London and Frankfurt. In September 1957, a Starliner made the first nonstop flight from Los Angeles to London; this was captained by TWA’s chief pilot, Bob Buck, who wrote an extensive magazine article describing the experience.

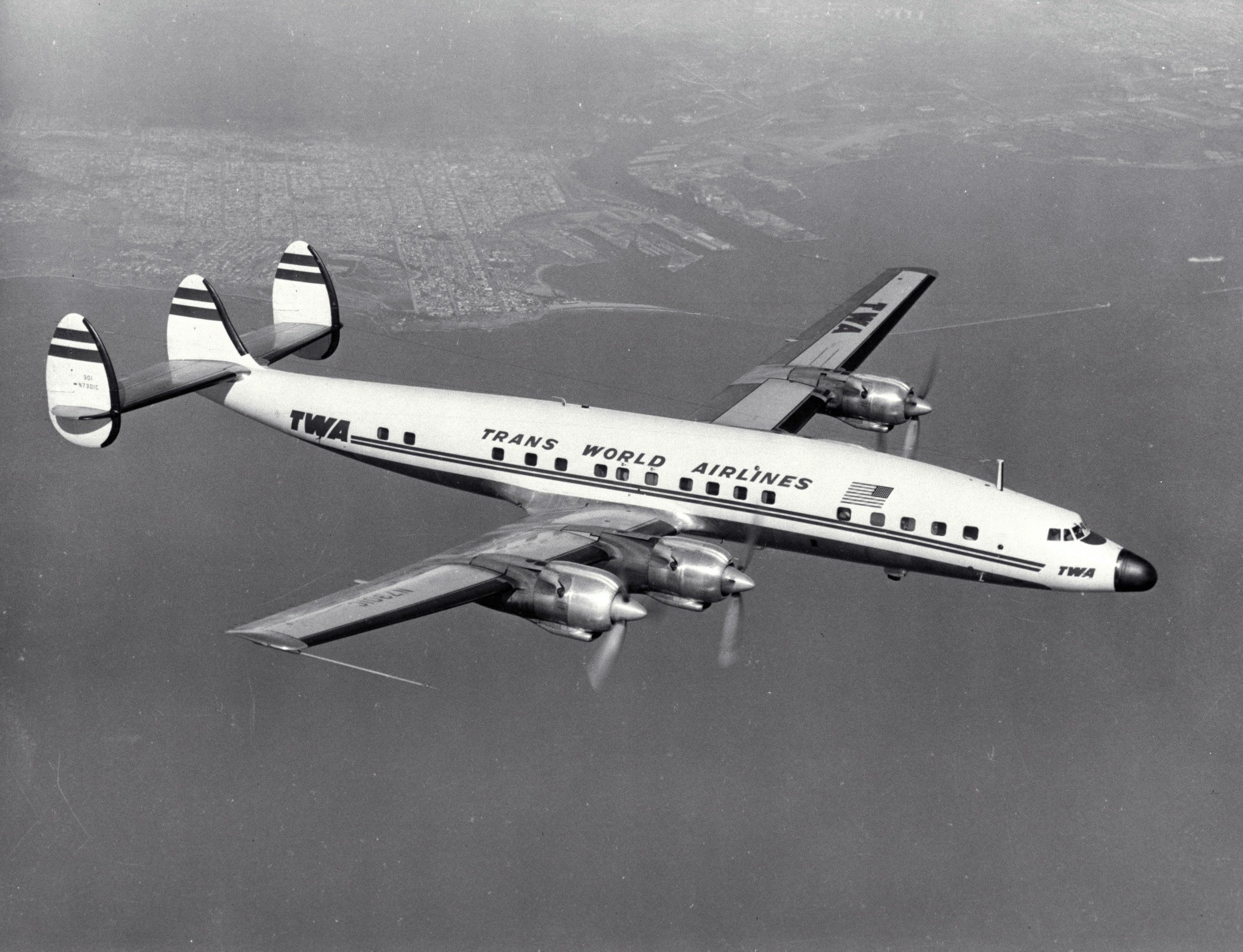
A TWA L-1649A Starliner in flight. This aircraft (N7301C) was written off after it crashed in Bogotá, on December 18, 1966, while in service with Aerocondor Colombia. A similar aircraft also crashed.

TWA called their L-1649s "Jetstreams" and flew them on longer domestic routes and on flights from New York to Europe and beyond. In July 1958 TWA scheduled 60 flights a week from Europe to New York; 30 were L-1649s, including seven nonstops a week from Paris, five from London, four from Frankfurt, two each from Madrid, Lisbon and Geneva, one from Zurich and one from Rome. Three 1649s a week flew the polar route Europe to California, sometimes nonstop.

Boeing 707s replaced the last TWA transatlantic passenger L-1649 in October 1961; 707s and Convair 880s displaced them from domestic scheduled flights in December 1962. In the early 1960s Lockheed converted twelve TWA L1649s to freighters that carried cargo across the Atlantic until 1964 and domestically until 1967.

Air France bought ten Starliners; they were the only airline to market the aircraft by its name (being called the "Super Starliner"). Transatlantic flights lasted from August 1957 until September 1960 when the Boeing 707 took over. Starting in April 1958 Air France L-1649s flew from Paris to Anchorage to Tokyo, but they were not allowed to fly to the west coast of the United States. In summer 1959 they scheduled 22 nonstop L-1649s a week from Orly to Idlewild, four of which continued to Mexico City; two weekly L-1649s flew from Orly to Montreal to Chicago Midway and back. The twice-weekly ORY-ANC-TYO flight was scheduled for 30 hr 45 min, compared to 42 hr 20 min for the fastest 1049G via India (and 32 hr 00 min for BOAC's Comet from London to Tokyo via India).

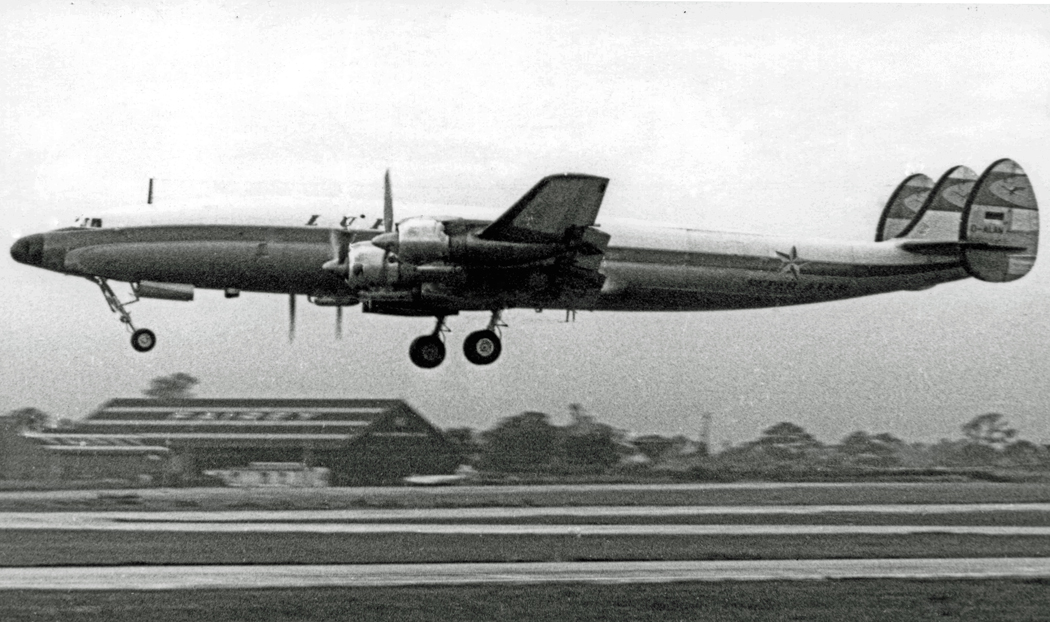
Lufthansa Starliner taking off from Manchester Airport in 1961 when operating a freight schedule to New York's Idlewild Airport

Lufthansa was the last airline to purchase the Starliner new; their four Starliners were marketed as "Super Stars" and flew transatlantic routes. Lufthansa's Starliners were delivered nonstop to Hamburg from the Lockheed factory at Burbank. In summer 1959 Lufthansa scheduled nonstops to New York from Frankfurt, Düsseldorf and Orly. Lockheed converted two of Lufthansa's Starliners to freighters after the Boeing 707 had replaced them on the transatlantic passenger flights in 1960.

Linee Aeree Italiane (LAI) ordered four Starliners, but did not take them up following the merger with Alitalia in October 1957. Alitalia had accepted the DC-7C and had no interest in the Starliners; they were delivered to TWA in 1958. Varig ordered two Starliners, but the order was switched to two L-1049Gs.

The DC-7C ended up selling more airframes than the Starliner, which had greater range than its rival but was expensive ($3,000,000 USD) and entered service a year later. In the end, only 44 Starliners were built (including the prototype) compared to 121 DC-7Cs.

Alaska Airlines used two Starliners for MATS operations in the 1960s. Other operators used Starliners for charter flights. A small number of Starliners were used as cargo aircraft in Alaska during the 1970s. By the early 1980s, all Starliners ceased commercial operations.

Four Starliners still exist; after ten years of work Lufthansa abandoned restoring one to flying condition. Another was sent in 2018 for the TWA Hotel.

== Variants ==
L-1649A
Initial production version powered by four Wright R-3350 988 TC18-EA-2 engines. 44 built.
L-1649B
Proposed turboprop version. None built.

== Accidents and incidents ==
- June 26, 1959 – TWA Flight 891, crashed due to a lightning strike after taking off from Milan Malpensa Airport in Italy, with the loss of all 68 passengers and crew.
- May 10, 1961 – Air France Flight 406, named "De Grasse" broke up in flight after empennage failure over the Sahara Desert, thought to have been caused by an explosive device, killing all 78 passengers and crew.

== Surviving aircraft ==
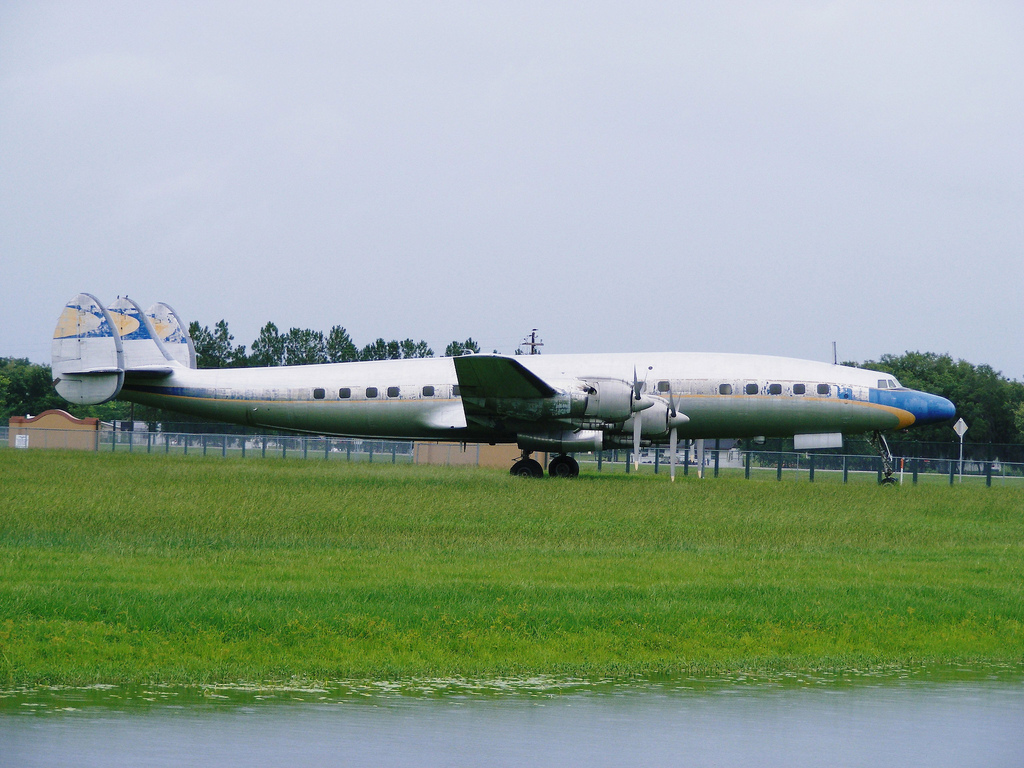
N974R in semi-Lufthansa colors on display at the Fantasy of Flight aviation museum.

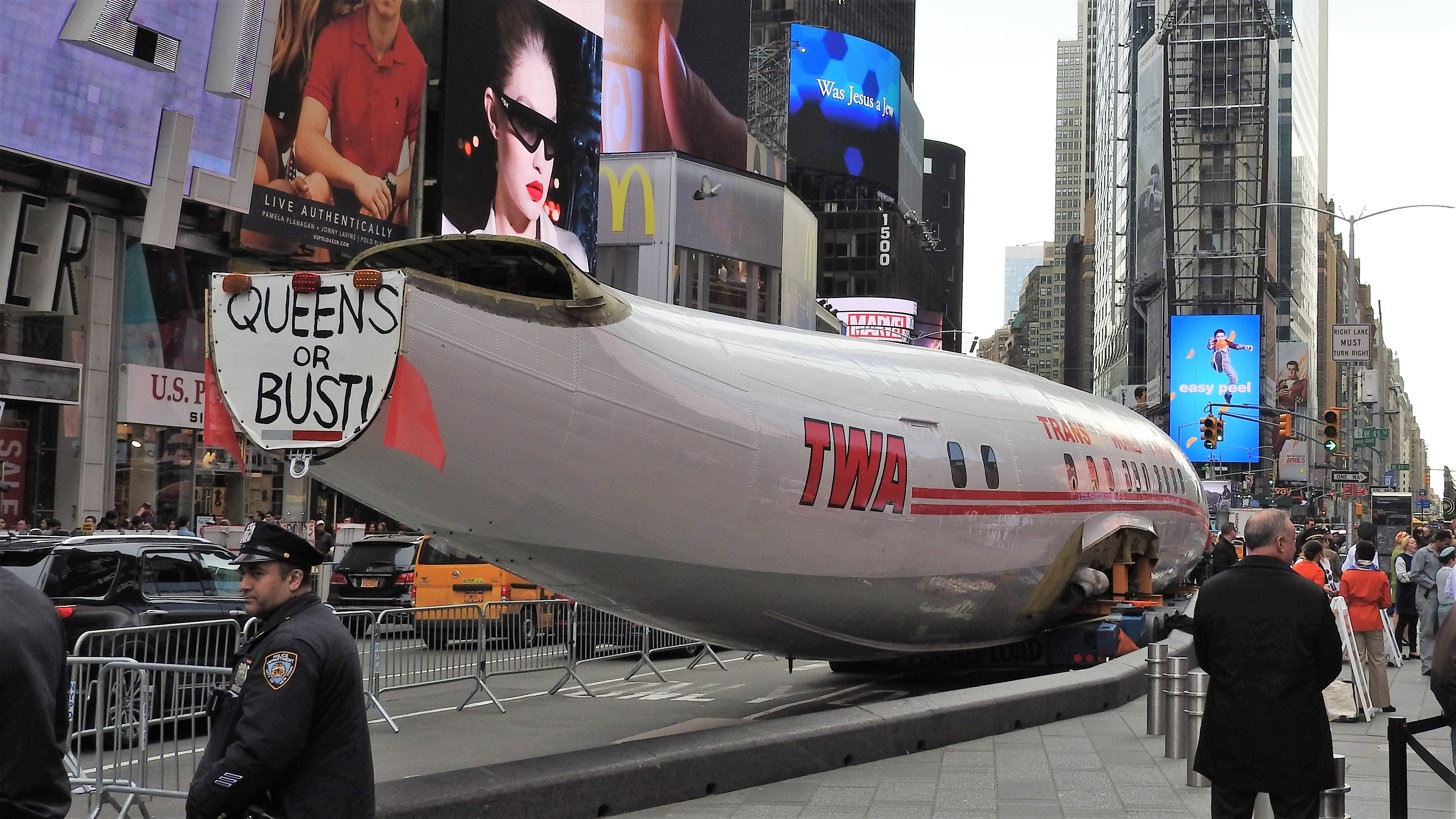
The fuselage of N8083H being transported through Times Square, en-route to John F. Kennedy International Airport

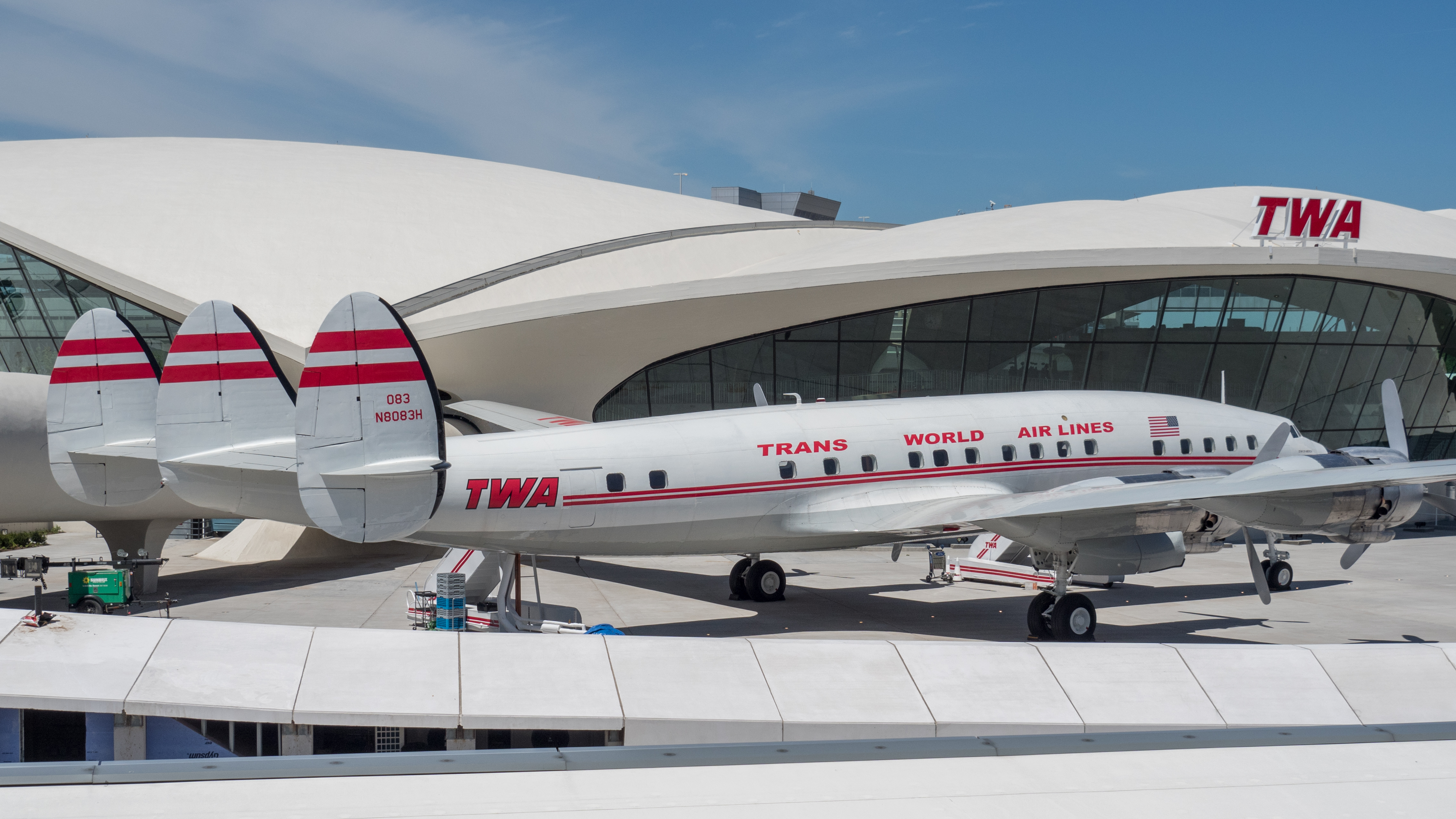
N8083H at the TWA Hotel after reassembly

Four Starliners have survived into preservation.

- N7316C (c/n 1018) at Auburn-Lewiston Airport in Maine was planned to be restored to flying condition by Lufthansa; first flight of the restored aircraft was planned for sometime in 2017 to 2018, with the extensive restoration having been continuous since 2007. After putting 150 Million Euros into the project, Lufthansa announced in March 2018 that it was moving restoration to Germany. Decisions about further restoration where said to be made after it arrived in Germany, but they were no longer planning to provide commercial flights. In February 2021 the plane was relocated from its storage in Bremen harbour to Paderborn-Lippstadt airport due to shelter availability there. By July 2022 the aircraft was on Lufthansa Berlin Foundation's website.
- N8083H (c/n 1038), also at Auburn-Lewiston Airport, was being salvaged for parts for N7316C's restoration. The aircraft was restored and painted in TWA's 1950's livery and placed on display at the TWA Hotel that opened on May 15, 2019 at the former TWA terminal at John F. Kennedy Airport, where it serves as the hotel's cocktail lounge.
- N974R (c/n 1040) is on display, outside the Fantasy of Flight museum in Polk City, Florida.
- ZS-DVJ (c/n 1042), currently in Trek Airways colours, is at Rand Airport as part of the static display of the South African Airways Museum Society .

== Specifications (L-1649A) ==
Data from Lockheed aircraft since 1913, SAA Museum Society - Lockheed L1649 Starliner, Lockheed Constellation:From Excalibur to Starliner

General characteristics

- Crew: five
- Capacity: 99 passengers
- Length: 116 ft 2 in (35.41 m)
- Wingspan: 150 ft (46 m)
- Height: 24 ft 9 in (7.54 m)
- Wing area: 1,850 sq ft (172 m^{2})
- Airfoil: root: NACA 0015; tip: NACA 0011
- Empty weight: 91,645 lb (41,569 kg)
- Max takeoff weight: 156,104 lb (70,808 kg)
- Powerplant: 4 × Wright R-3350 988 TC18-EA-2 Duplex-Cyclone 18 cylinder air-cooled radial piston engines, 3,400 hp (2,500 kW) each
- Propellers: 3-bladed Hamilton Standard Hydromatic 43H60, 16 ft 10 in (5.13 m) diameter constant-speed fully-feathering Duralumin propellers

Performance

- Maximum speed: 377 mph (607 km/h, 328 kn) at 18,600 ft (5,669 m)
- Cruise speed: 290 mph (470 km/h, 250 kn)
- Range: 4,940 mi (7,950 km, 4,290 nmi) with 19,500 lb (8,845 kg) payload

6,180 mi (5,370 nmi; 9,946 km) with 8,000 lb (3,629 kg) payload

- Service ceiling: 23,700 ft (7,200 m)
- Rate of climb: 1,080 ft/min (5.5 m/s)
- Wing loading: 86.5 lb/sq ft (422 kg/m^{2})
- Power/mass: 0.0847 hp/lb (0.1392 kW/kg)

== See also ==
Related development

- Lockheed Constellation – Family of US airliners with 4 piston engines, 1943
- Lockheed L-049 Constellation – US airliner with 4 piston engines, 1943
- Lockheed C-69 Constellation – Early military version of the Constellation
- Lockheed L-1049 Super Constellation – US airliner with 4 piston engines, 1951
- Lockheed C-121 Constellation – Military transport version of Constellation
- Lockheed EC-121 Warning Star – Airborne early warning and control aircraft based on the Constellation airframe

Aircraft of comparable role, configuration, and era

- Boeing 377 – US airliner with 4 piston engines, 1947
- Douglas DC-6 – US airliner with 4 piston engines, 1946
- Douglas DC-7 – US airliner with 4 piston engines, 1953
- Ilyushin Il-18 – Soviet medium- to long-range airliner with 4 turboprop engines, 1957

Related lists

- List of Lockheed aircraft
- List of Lockheed Constellation variants
- List of Lockheed Constellation operators
