= Flitestar =

- Founded: 16 October 1991
- Ceased operations: 11 April 1994
- Fleet size: 6
- Parent company: Trek Airways

Flitestar was a South African commercial airline that operated from 1991 to 1994.

== Company history ==
Flitestar was the first South African airline to directly challenge the monopoly of South African Airways (SAA). It was a subsidiary of Trek Airways; the actual name of the airline was Trek Airways Flitestar, but it operated under the brand name Flitestar. The airline began operations on 16 October 1991 using four new leased Airbus A320-211 aircraft.

Flitestar concentrated on serving the business market without neglecting other passengers, which gained it up to 25% of the domestic market with load factors of 63% or more. On 11 April 1994 Flitestar and Trek Airways ceased operations.

== Destinations ==
Flitestar served the following destinations:

South Africa

- Alexander Bay
- Cape Town
- Durban
- George
- Johannesburg
- Port Elizabeth

Namibia

- Walvis Bay

== Fleet ==
Flitestar Fleet
Aircraft	In fleet	Notes
Airbus A320-211	4	
ATR 72-202	2	
Total	6	
