= Trek Airways =

South African airline

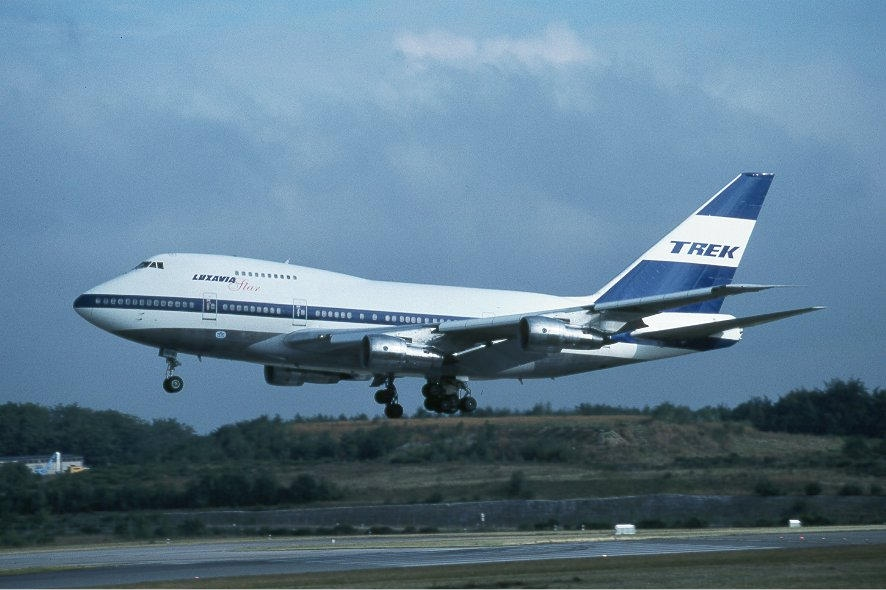
- Trek Airways Boeing 747SP.
| IATA | ICAO | Call sign |
|---|---|---|
| JW | TKE | TREKAIR |
- Founded: August 1953
- Ceased operations: April 1994
- Headquarters: South Africa

Trek Airways was an airline based in South Africa that operated from August 1953 until April 1994.

== History ==
Founded in 1953 by retired German Generalmajor Friedrich Wilhelm von Mellenthin (1904–1997), Trek Airways was the only South African airline apart from SAA to fly international services. At the beginning, flights were operated from Europe to South Africa with one over-night stop. The aircraft used at the time was the Vickers VC.1 Viking. Since the Viking did not have the range for the operations, they were replaced by the Douglas DC-4 and Lockheed L-749A Constellation. Later on it operated the Lockheed L-1649 Starliner.

Trek operated from London, Düsseldorf, Vienna and Luxembourg to Windhoek and Johannesburg with two or three intermediate stops. In 1964 an arrangement with Luxair was made whereby Luxair would carry connecting passengers to other European airports.

It was in 1968 that the first jet aircraft was used when a Boeing 707 was introduced, but with the embargo of South African registered aircraft due to Apartheid, Trek had to suspend flights for a period of time. Those operations were re-established in 1991 and once again a co-operation with Luxair was established whereby Trek used a Luxair/Luxavia Boeing 747SP painted in the old Trek color scheme. It was also during this time that Trek founded a subsidiary called Flitestar using Airbus A320 and ATR-72 aircraft. In 1991, politics changed again and the South African Government deregulated its aviation policy. Trek Airways applied for and was granted a license for a South African domestic service, in direct competition to SAA. Flitestar was born operating Airbus A320s. On 11 April 1994, Trek ceased all operations.

== Fleet details ==
- Vickers VC.1 Viking
- Douglas DC-4
- Lockheed L-749A Constellation
- Lockheed L-1649 Starliner
- Boeing 747-SP

== Bibliography ==
- Potgieter H., Aviation in South Africa, Jane's Publishing Co. Ltd., London, 1986
- Guttery B. R., Encyclopedia of African airlines, McFarland & Co. Inc., Jefferson (N.C.), 1998
- Gaskell K., South African skies, Airlife Publishing Ltd., Shrewsbury (UK), 2001
- William Buckland "Paddy" Rorke: Trek Airways – A South African Adventure, Athena Press, 2007
