= List of Lockheed Constellation operators =

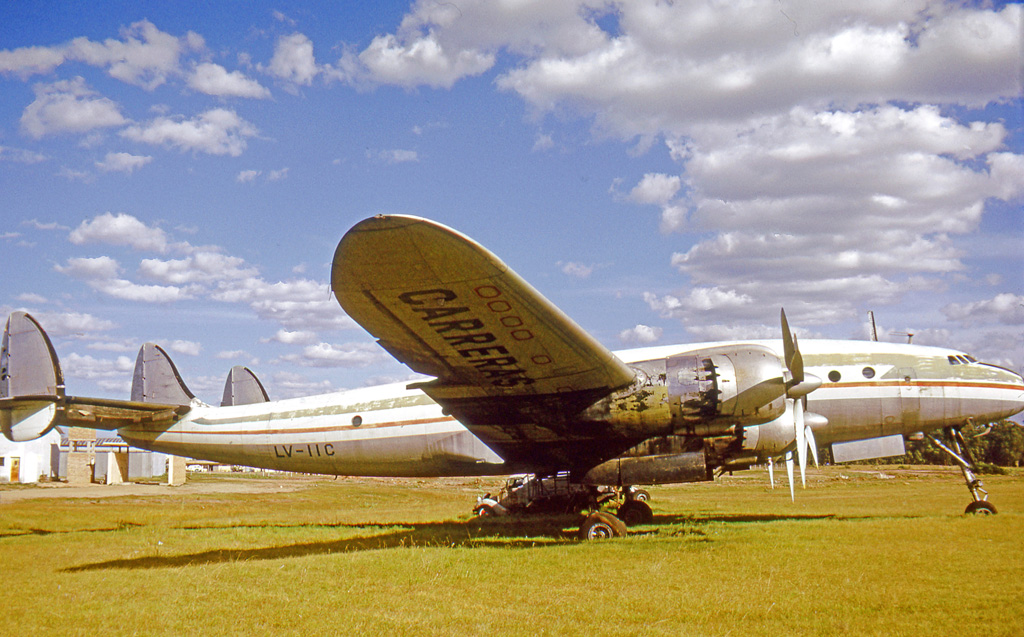
L-749A of Aerolineas Carreras (Argentina) in 1975

The Lockheed Constellation was used by dozens of airlines and militaries around the world. In military service, the Navy/Air Force EC-121 Warning Star variant remained operational until 1978, nearly 40 years after work on the L-049 began.

♠ Original operators

== Commercial ==
Lockheed built 856 planes. Civilian airlines that operated the Constellation included:

Argentina

- Aerolíneas Carreras
- Aerotransportes Entre Ríos - AER
- Trans Atlántica Argentina
- Transcontinental ♠

Australia

- Qantas ♠

Austria

- Aero Transport

Belgium

- Sabena

Brazil

- Panair do Brasil
- Real Transportes Aéreos ♠
- Varig ♠

Canada

- Nordair ♠
- Trans Canada Airlines ♠ (Now Air Canada)

Ceylon

- Air Ceylon

Chile

- Transportes Aéreos Squella

Republic of China (Taiwan)

- China Airlines

Colombia

- Avianca ♠
- LANZA

Cuba

- Cubana de Aviación ♠

Dominican Republic

- Aerolineas Mundo S.A.-AMSA
- Aerotours Dominicana
- Aerovías Quisqueyana

France

- Air France ♠
- CATAIR - Compagnie d'Affretements et de Transports Aeriens

Germany

- Lufthansa ♠

Haiti

- Air Haiti International

India

- Air India ♠

Ireland

- Aer Lingus ♠

Israel

- El Al ♠

Ivory Coast

- Air Afrique

Republic of Korea

- Korean National Airlines (Now Korean Air)

Luxembourg

- Luxair

Mexico

- Aeronaves de México (Now Aeromexico)
- Aerovias Guest ♠

Morocco

- Royal Air Maroc

Netherlands

- KLM ♠

Pakistan

- Pakistan International Airlines

Panama

- AFISA - Aero Fletes Internacionales SA
- Líneas Aéreas de Panama

Paraguay

- Lloyd Aéreo Paraguayo

Peru

- LANSA
- Perú Internacional - COPISA
- Trans-Peruana

Portugal

- Transportes Aéreos Portugueses (TAP) ♠

Senegal

- Government of Senegal

South Africa

- South African Airways ♠
- Trek Airways

Spain

- Iberia ♠

Thailand

- Thai Airways Company ♠

United Kingdom

- ACE Freighters
- British Overseas Airways Corporation
- Britannia Airways
- Euravia
- Falcon Airways
- Trans European Aviation
- Skyways of London
- Universal Sky Tours

United States

- Aerovias Sud Americana (aka ASA International Airlines)
- Airlift International
- Alaska Airlines
- American Airlines
- American Flyers Airline
- American Overseas Airlines ♠ (7 x L-049)
- Associated Air Transport
- Braniff International Airways
- California Eastern Airways
- California Hawaiian Airlines
- Capital Airlines
- Capitol Airways
- Central American Airways
- Central American International
- Chicago and Southern Air Lines ♠
- Delta Air Lines
- Eastern Air Lines ♠
- Federal Aviation Administration
- Flying Tiger Line ♠
- Great Lakes Airlines
- Hawthorne Nevada Airlines
- Imperial Airlines
- Intercontinent Airways
- Miami Airlines
- Modern Air Transport
- NASA
- National Airlines ♠ (4 x L-1049H)
- Northwest Orient Airlines
- Pacific Air Transport
- Pacific Northern Airlines
- Pan American World Airways ♠
- Paradise Airlines
- Regina Cargo Airlines
- Resort Airlines ♠
- Standard Airways
- Seaboard & Western Airlines ♠ ( 4 x L-1049D, 5 x L-1049H)
- Seaboard World Airlines
- Slick Airways ♠
- South Pacific Air Lines
- Trans International Airlines
- Trans World Airlines ♠ (launch operator)
- Western Airlines
- Wien Air Alaska

Uruguay

- Aerolíneas Uruguayas
- Compañía Aeronáutica Uruguaya (CAUSA)

Venezuela

- Linea Aeropostal Venezolana (LAV) ♠

== Military operators ==
France
- French Air Force
India
- Indian Air Force
- Indian Navy
Indonesia
- Indonesian Air Force
Israel
- Israeli Air Force
United States
- United States Air Force ♠
- United States Navy ♠
