= B31 =

B31 or B-31 may refer to:

- B-31 (Michigan county highway)
- B31 (New York City bus)
- Bundesstraße 31, a German road
- Douglas XB-31, an experimental aircraft
