= Avion Pirata =

Airplane

Avión Pirata
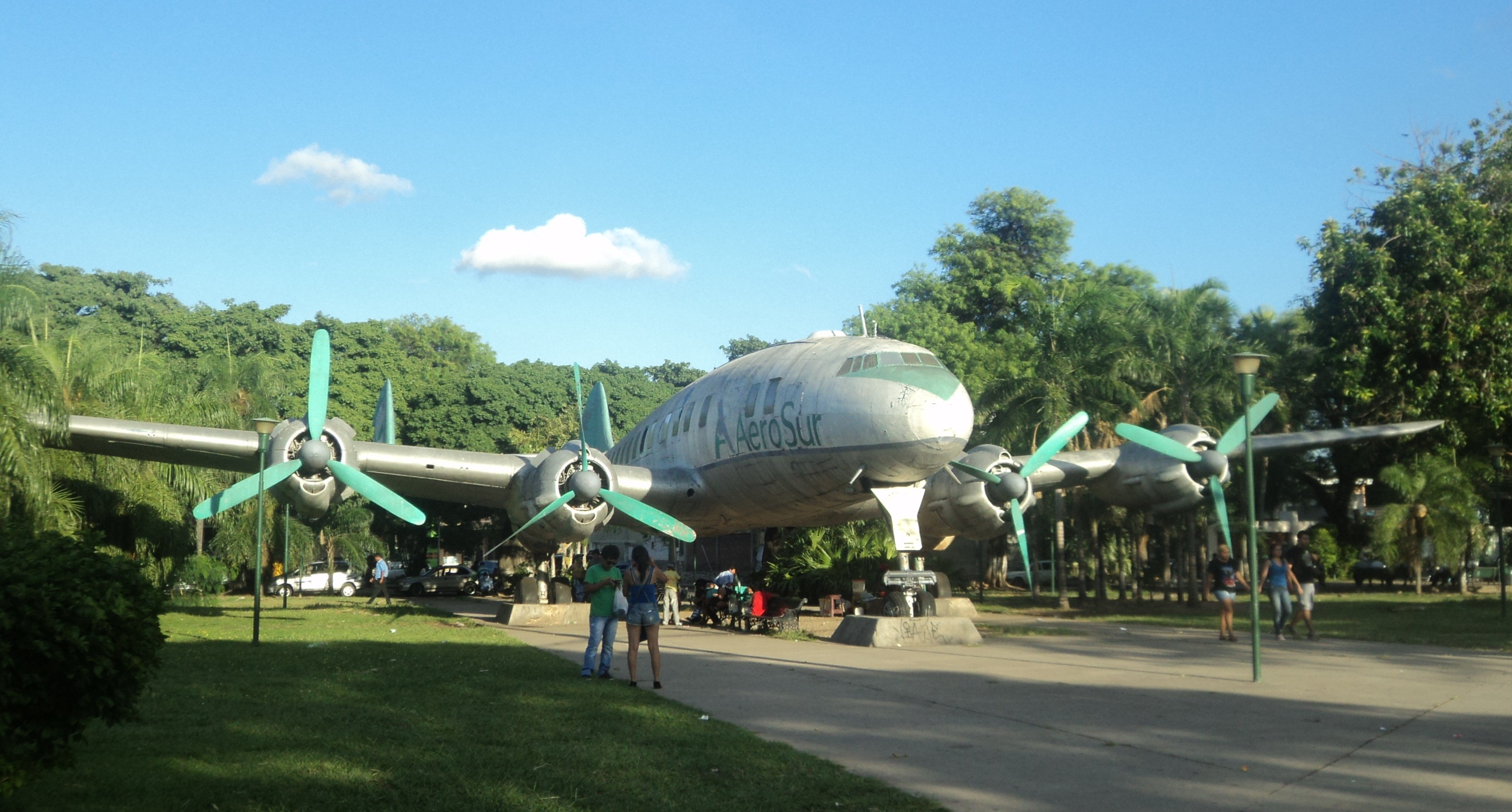
- Avión Pirata in Santa Cruz Bolivia, January 2014

General information
- Type: Lockheed 049-45 Constellation
- Manufacturer: Lockheed Aircraft Corporation
- Owners: previously Braniff International Airlines 8/55 - 11/60
- Construction number: 2081
- Registration: N2520B, previously YV-C-AME

History
- Last flight: 30 July 1961
- Preserved at: Boris Banzer Prada Park, Santa Cruz, Bolivia; 17.77565°S 63.17395°W
- Fate: converted to a library and later a bank branch

Avión Pirata (Pirate Airplane) is the name given by Bolivians to a Lockheed Constellation which mysteriously carried flights into El Trompillo Airport in Santa Cruz, Bolivia, during 1961. The airplane has remained in Bolivia since 1961, when it was forced to land by the Bolivian Air Force after a chase in which an Air Force Captain died in a crash.

The airplane has become a tourist attraction, having undergone several changes of ownership, and has also become an urban legend among Bolivians.

== The airplane ==
Lockheed Constellation (N2520B) of Braniff International Airways in 1956.

The airplane is a Lockheed Constellation with the registration N2520B, which at the time of the incident was registered to Lloyd Airlines of Miami, Florida (not to be confused with Lloyd Aereo Boliviano, the then flag-carrier of Bolivia). According to AeroTransport Data Bank the airplane was sold to a Brandon Anderson in 1958. The airplane had previously flown for Braniff International Airways and Trans American Airlines before being acquired by the Empire Supply Company in 1960, months before the incident happened. A model airplane of this aircraft exists, as Corgi Toys released a model of the Constellation under Braniff livery.

== The fateful flight ==
During some time before N2520B's final flight, Constellations had been conducting night flights to El Trompillo Airport. Locals believe that these transported goods to Buenos Aires, Argentina and Arica, Chile, among other destinations, from the United States, such as cigarettes, textiles, whiskey, socks, television sets and contraband items.

On Saturday, 29 July 1961, the airplane landed at El Trompillo Airport, and rested there until 30 July, when it took off southward. The plane's occupants had not filed a flight plan; instead they said they were carrying a practice-only flight. Immediately after take-off, Trompillo control tower alerted the Fuerza Aérea Boliviana, which sent P-51 Mustang fighters to chase it. The P-51 pilots and the control tower asked the plane's crew to fly to Cochabamba, but the crew ignored the request.

The P-51s then proceeded to shoot at the airplane, making the Constellation crew attempt an emergency landing at El Trompillo Airport. As the aircraft descended, the crew dived in a final attempt at getting the P-51's to call off their pursuit, causing one pilot, Captain Alberto Peredo Céspedes, to crash fatally. The Constellation itself landed at El Trompillo, and the crew members were arrested on site. The aircraft's tires were blown up and the local military airline, TAM, flew soldiers in from Cochabamba to prevent the airport from being overtaken by guerrillas.

== Crew trial ==
Following the incident, Bolivian President Víctor Paz Estenssoro ordered an investigation which yielded the arrest of 85 soldiers and dishonorable discharge of 130 more. Also arrested were pilots William Roy Robinson and William Friedman, co-pilot Salvatore Henrique Romano, flight engineer Bertrand Vinson and radio-man Gene Hawkins. The case and its investigation became known nationally in Bolivia as the caso Constellation.

The four Americans and one Brazilian (Henrique Romano) were charged with homicide, piracy, violation of international laws and contraband. After being incarcerated at Panóptico de La Paz jail, three of them were given provisional freedom and two were admitted into a local hospital under the supervision of American vice-consul in Bolivia at the time, Samuel Karp.

In November 1961, it was announced that the airplane's crew had escaped Bolivia. They were tried in absentia, and in 1967, the case's prosecutor asked for ten years of prison for each crew-member. Ultimately, none of the five men on the airplane returned to Bolivia and four of them remain at large.

Pilot William Roy Robinson died on 1 April 2010, aged 90, and is buried in the family cemetery, San Mateo, Florida.

== Airplane's fate ==
On 25 August 1961, a local judge assigned a Bolivian Air Force Commander as keeper of the airplane and the contents that it had during its last flight, as compensation for the P-51 lost during the plane's chase. But the La Paz district's customs department prevented this from actually taking place, and the plane became the property of the FAB's Military Aviation College instead. In 1979, the airplane was moved to Boris Banzer Prada Park at Uruguay avenue in Santa Cruz from El Trompillo airport, as it was given to Santa Cruz's city government, which decided to place it at barrio El Tao, where the park is located.

The plane was later transformed into a library, and it was later used as a Banco de Crédito de Bolivia branch after having fallen into disrepair and being restored. It has been used for advertisement purposes by Pepsi and Aerosur, the now-defunct major local airline. The airplane was reported by a television news show to be in disrepair late in 2014.

== See also ==
- Ryanair Flight 4978
