= Lockheed Constellation =

Family of US airliners with 4 piston engines, 1943

Constellation
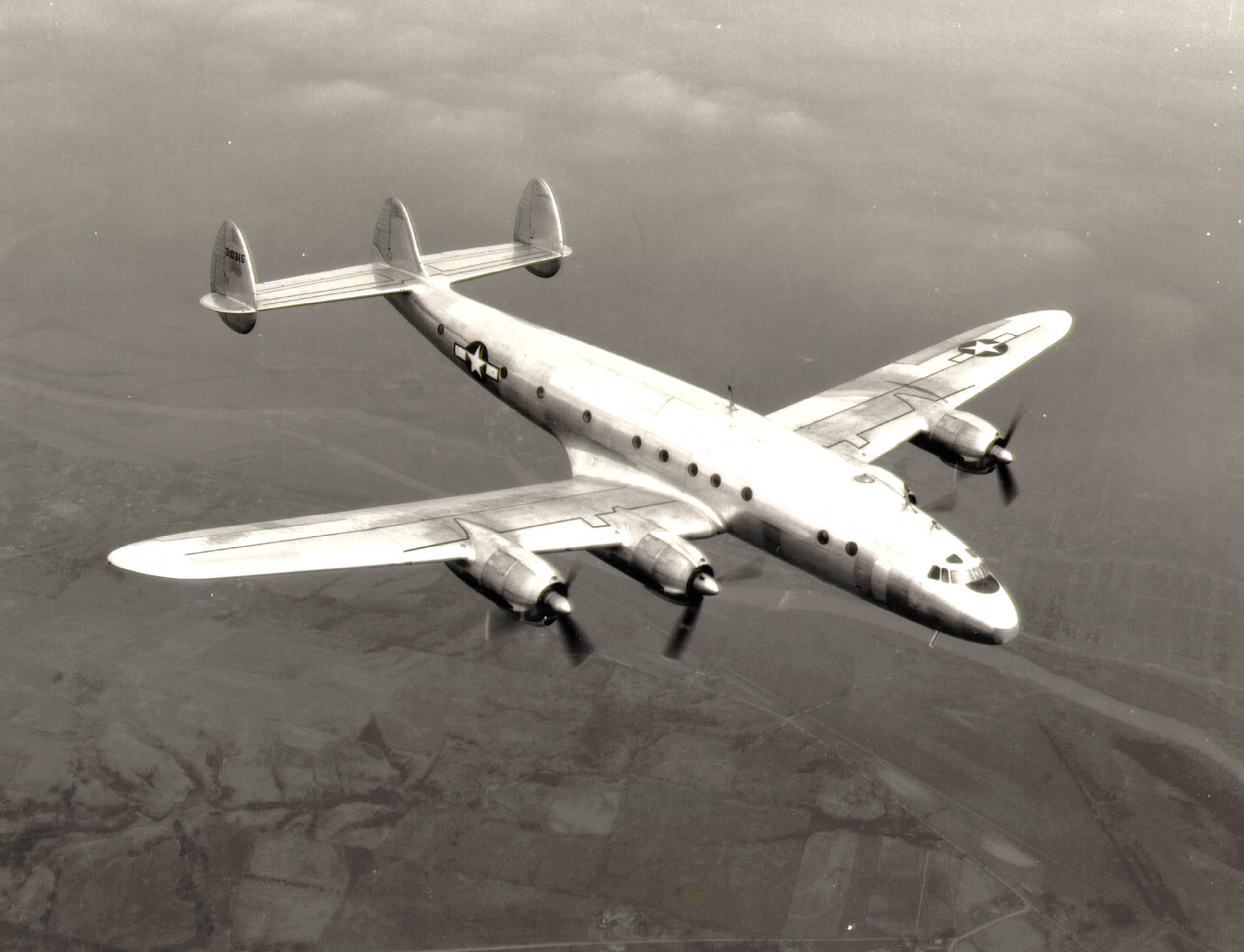
- A USAF C-69, the military version of the Constellation

General information
- Type: Airliner and transport
- Manufacturer: Lockheed
- Status: In very limited service
- Primary user: Trans World Airlines
- Number built: 856

History
- Manufactured: 1943–1958
- Introduction date: 1943 with USAAF; 1945 with TWA
- First flight: January 9, 1943
- Retired: 1990s, airline service 1978, military
- Developed from: L-044 Excalibur
- Variants: L-049 Constellation; C-69 Constellation; L-649 Constellation; L-749 Constellation; L-1049 Super Constellation; C-121/R7V Constellation; R7V-2/YC-121F Constellation; EC-121 Warning Star; L-1649A Starliner
- Developed into: Lockheed XB-30 (Unbuilt)

The Lockheed Constellation ("Connie") is a propeller-driven, four-engined airliner built by Lockheed Corporation starting in 1943. The Constellation series was the first civil airliner family to enter widespread use equipped with a pressurized cabin, enabling it to fly well above most bad weather, thus improving the general safety and ease of commercial passenger air travel.

Several models of the Constellation series were produced, all with the distinctive triple tail and dolphin-shaped fuselage. Most were powered by four 18-cylinder Wright R-3350 Duplex-Cyclones. In total, 856 were produced between 1943 and 1958 at Lockheed's plant in Burbank, California, and used as civil airliners and as a military and civilian cargo transports. They were notably used during the Berlin and the Biafran airlifts. Three served as the presidential aircraft for Dwight D. Eisenhower, one of which is at the National Museum of the United States Air Force.

== Design and development ==
=== Initial studies ===
Lockheed had been working on the L-044 Excalibur, a four-engined, pressurized airliner, since 1937. In 1939, Transcontinental and Western Airlines (TWA), at the instigation of major stockholder Howard Hughes, requested a 40-passenger transcontinental airliner with a range of 3,500 mi (5,600 km)—well beyond the capabilities of the Excalibur design. TWA's requirements led to the L-049 Constellation, designed by Lockheed engineers, including Kelly Johnson and Hall Hibbard. Willis Hawkins, another Lockheed engineer, maintains that the Excalibur program was purely a cover for the Constellation.

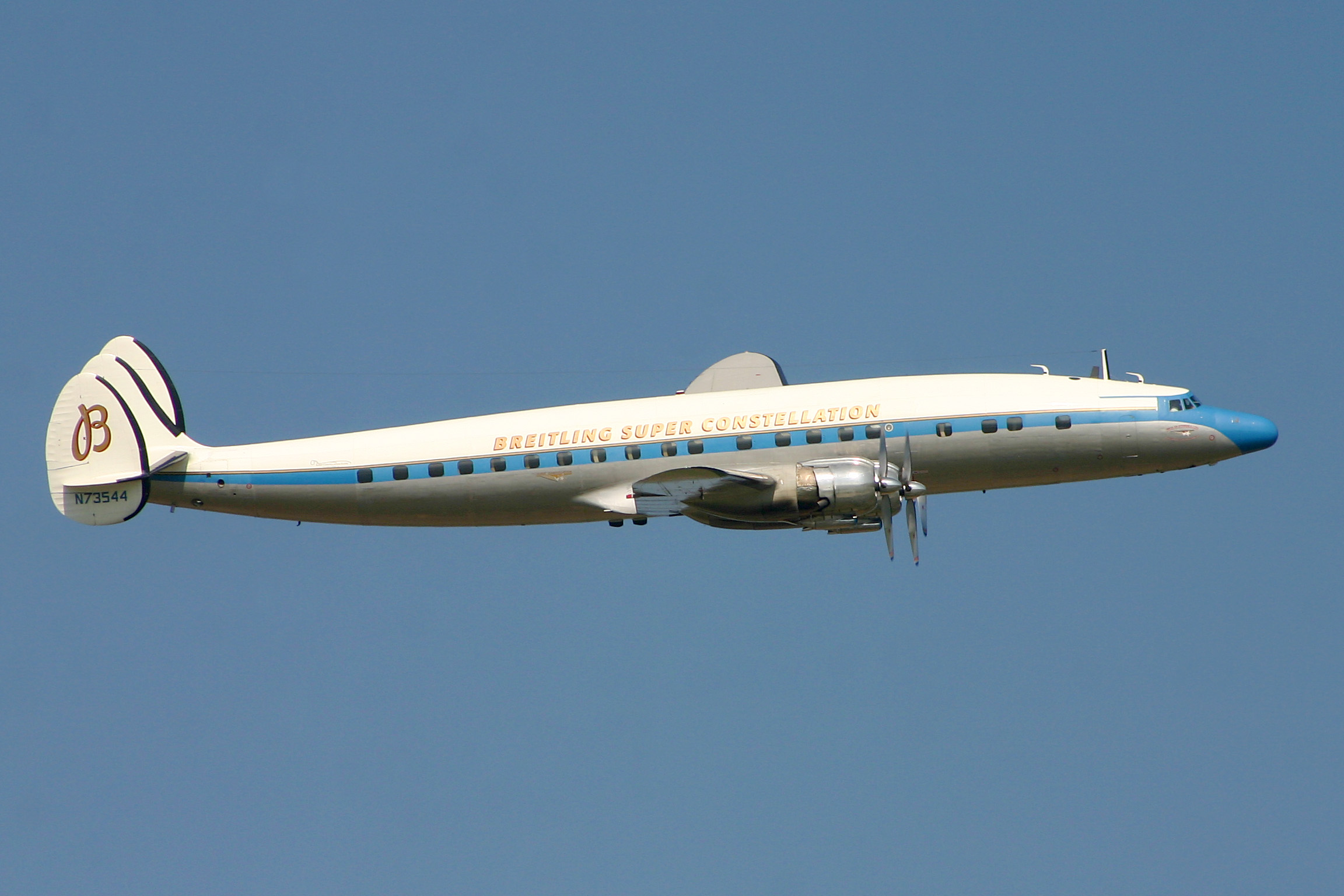
A preserved C-121C Super Constellation, registration N73544, in flight in 2004

=== Development of the Constellation ===
The Constellation's wing design was close to that of the Lockheed P-38 Lightning, differing mostly in size. The triple tail allowed the aircraft to fit into existing hangars, while features included hydraulically boosted controls and a deicing system used on wing and tail leading edges. The aircraft had a maximum speed over 375 mph (600 km/h), faster than that of a Japanese Zero fighter, a cruise speed of 340 mph (550 km/h), and a service ceiling of 24,000 ft (7,300 m).

According to Anthony Sampson in Empires of the Sky, Lockheed may have undertaken the intricate design, but Hughes's intercession in the design process drove the concept, shape, capabilities, appearance, and ethos. These rumors were discredited by Johnson. Howard Hughes and Jack Frye confirmed that the rumors were false in a letter dated November 1941.

== Operational history ==
=== World War II ===
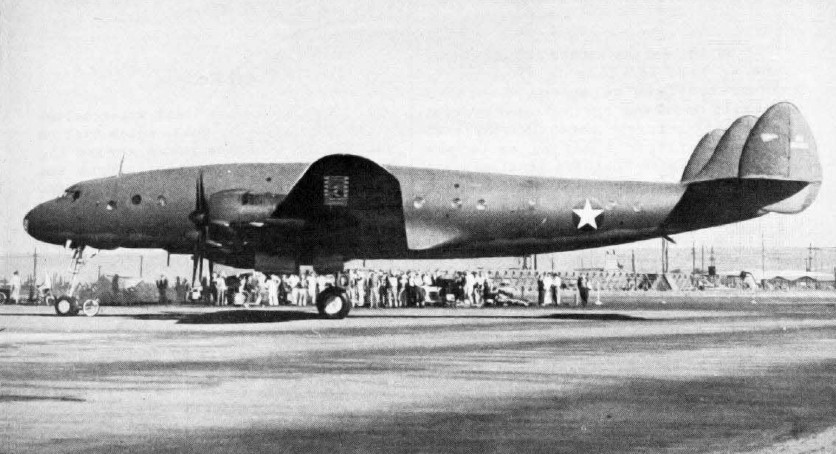
The first Lockheed Constellation on January 9, 1943

1944 newsreel about a Constellation flight from California to Washington, DC

With the onset of World War II, the TWA aircraft entering production were converted to an order for C-69 Constellation military transport aircraft, with 202 aircraft intended for the United States Army Air Forces (USAAF). The first prototype (civil registration NX25600) flew on January 9, 1943, a short ferry hop from Burbank to Muroc Field for testing. Edmund T. "Eddie" Allen, on loan from Boeing, flew left seat, with Lockheed's own Milo Burcham as copilot. Rudy Thoren and Kelly Johnson were also aboard.

Lockheed proposed the model L-249 as a long-range bomber. It received the military designation XB-30, but the aircraft was not developed. A plan for a very-long-range troop transport, the C-69B (L-349, ordered by Pan Am in 1940 as the L-149), was cancelled. A single C-69C (L-549), a 43-seat VIP transport, was built in 1945 at the Lockheed-Burbank plant.

The C-69 was mostly used as a high-speed, long-distance troop transport during the war. In total, 22 C-69s were built before the end of hostilities, but seven of these never entered military service, as they were converted to civilian L-049s on the assembly line. The USAAF cancelled the remainder of the order in 1945. Some aircraft remained in USAF service into the 1960s, serving as passenger ferries for the airline that relocated military personnel, wearing the livery of the Military Air Transport Service.

=== Postwar use ===
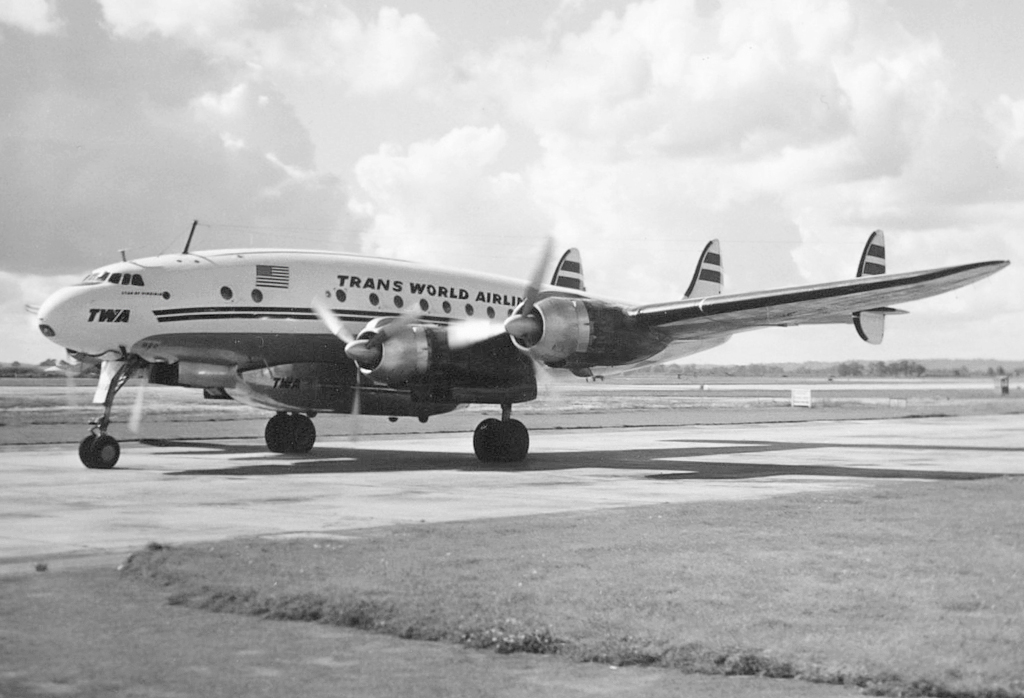
TWA L-749A Constellation at Heathrow in 1954 with an under fuselage "Speedpack" freight container

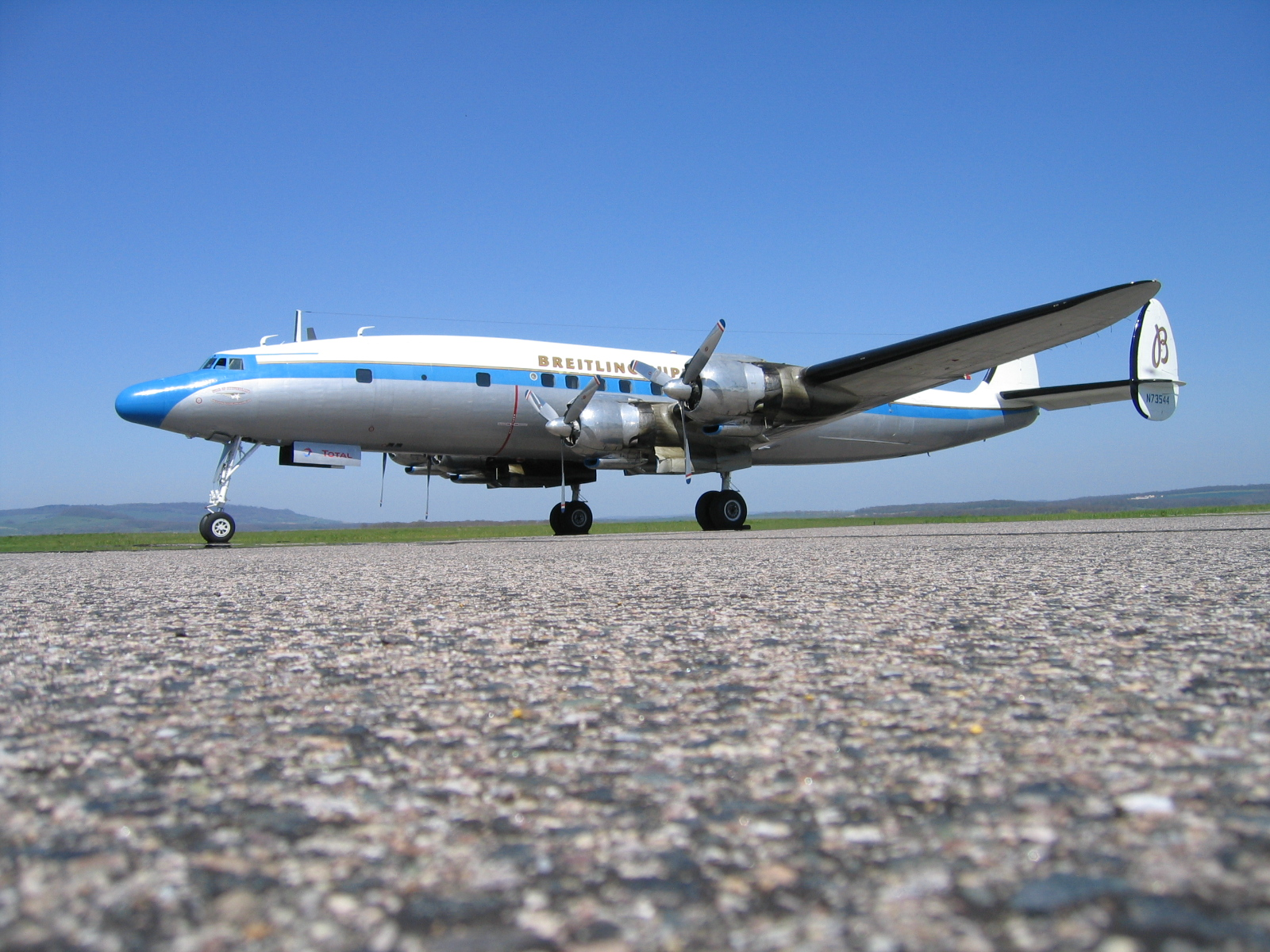
Super Constellation (C-121C) during pilot training in Epinal – Mirecourt, France

After World War II, the Constellation came into its own as a fast civilian airliner. Aircraft already in production for the USAAF as C-69 transports were finished as civilian airliners, with TWA receiving the first on 1 October 1945. TWA's first transatlantic proving flight departed Washington, DC, on December 3, 1945, arriving in Paris on December 4 via Gander and Shannon.

TWA transatlantic service started on February 6, 1946, with a New York City-Paris flight in a Constellation. On June 17, 1947, Pan American World Airways (Pan Am) opened the first-ever scheduled round-the-world service with its L-749 Clipper America. The famous flight "Pan Am 1" operated until 1982. https://www.wired.com/2009/06/dayintech-0617/ As the first pressurized airliner in widespread use, the Constellation helped establish affordable and comfortable air travel. Operators of Constellations included TWA, Eastern Air Lines, Pan Am, Air France, BOAC, KLM, Qantas, Lufthansa, Iberia Airlines, Panair do Brasil, TAP Portugal, Trans-Canada Air Lines (later renamed Air Canada), Aer Lingus, VARIG, Cubana de Aviación, Línea Aeropostal Venezolana, Northwest Airlines, and Avianca, the national airline of Colombia.

=== Records ===
Sleek and powerful, Constellations set many records. On April 17, 1944, the second production C-69, piloted by Howard Hughes and TWA president Jack Frye, flew from Burbank, California, to Washington, DC, a distance around 2,300 miles (3,700 km), in 6 hours and 57 minutes, representing an average speed of 331 miles per hour (533 km/h). On the return trip, the aircraft stopped at Wright Field in Ohio to give Orville Wright his last flight, more than 40 years after his historic first flight near Kitty Hawk, North Carolina. He commented that the Constellation's wingspan was longer than the distance of his first flight.

On September 29, 1957, a TWA L-1649A flew from Los Angeles to London in 18 hours and 32 minutes—about 5,420 miles (8,720 km) at 292 miles per hour (470 km/h). The L-1649A holds the record for the longest-duration, nonstop passenger flight aboard a piston-powered airliner. On TWA's first London-to-San Francisco flight on October 1–2, 1957, the aircraft stayed aloft for 23 hours and 19 minutes (about 5,350 miles (8,610 km) at 229 miles per hour (369 km/h)).

=== Obsolescence ===
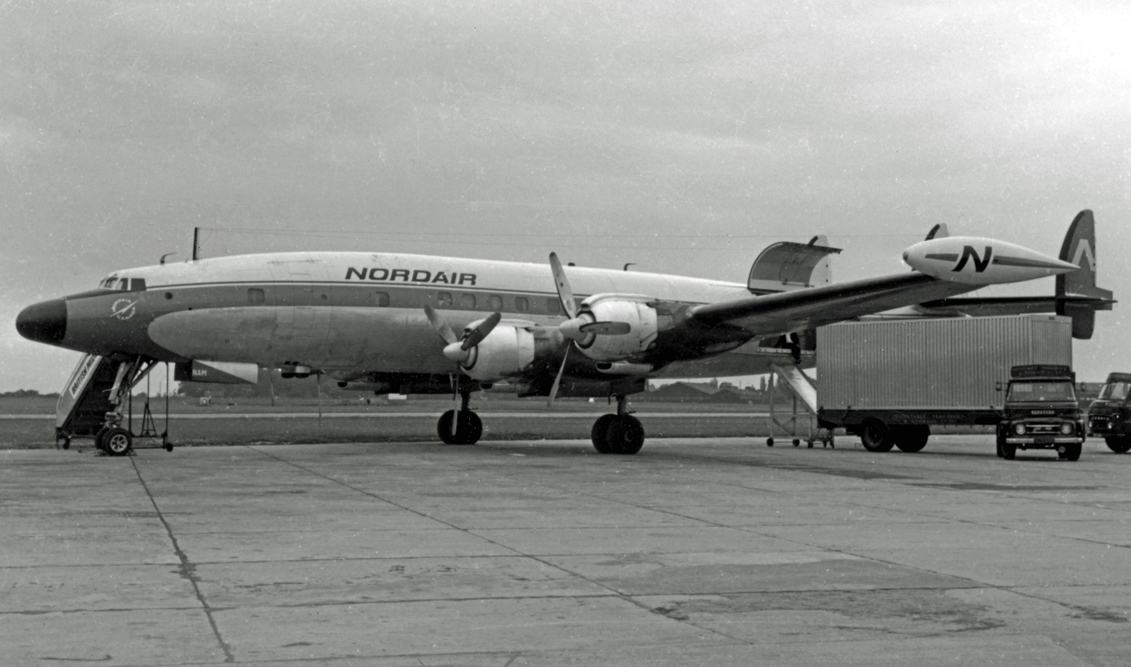
L-1049H freighter of Nordair Canada at Manchester Airport in 1966

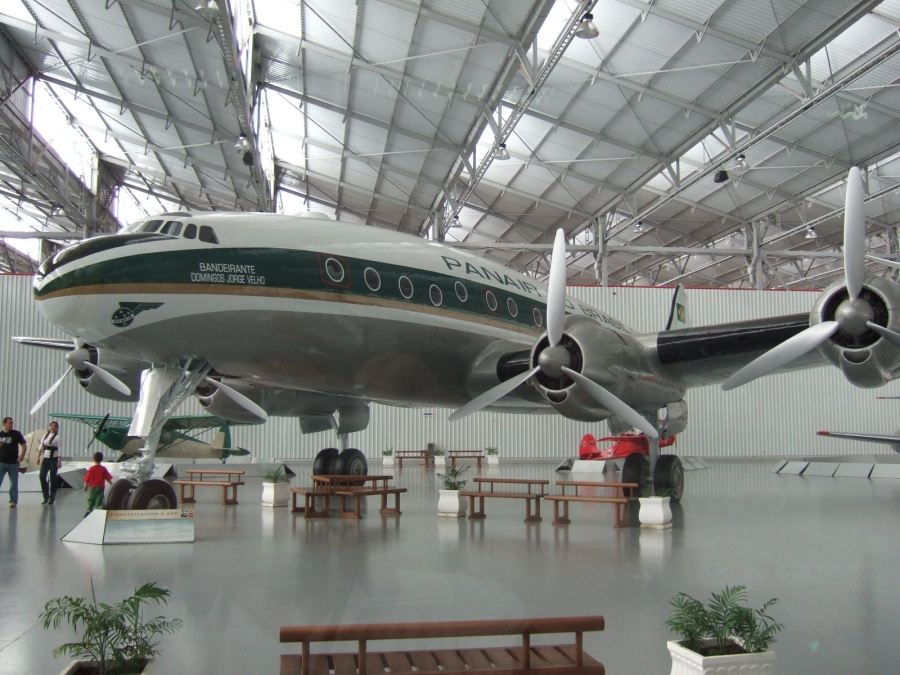
A Lockheed Constellation L-049 preserved at TAM Museum

Jet airliners such as the de Havilland Comet, Boeing 707, Douglas DC-8, Convair 880, and Sud Aviation Caravelle rendered the Constellation obsolete. The first routes lost to jets were the long overseas routes, but Constellations continued to fly domestic routes. The last scheduled passenger flight of a Constellation in the contiguous United States was made by a TWA L749 on May 11, 1967, from Philadelphia to Kansas City, Missouri; the last scheduled passenger flight in North America was by Western Airlines' N86525 in Alaska - Anchorage to Yakutat to Juneau on 26 November 1968.

Constellations carried freight in later years, and were used on backup sections of Eastern Airlines' shuttle service between New York, Washington, DC, and Boston until 1968. Propeller airliners were used on overnight freight runs into the 1990s, as their low speed was not an impediment. An Eastern Air Lines Connie holds the record for a New York–to–Washington, DC, flight from takeoff to touchdown in just over 30 minutes. The record was set prior to speed restrictions by the Federal Aviation Administration below 10,000 feet (3,000 m).

One of the reasons for the elegance of the aircraft was the dolphin-shaped fuselage, a continuously variable profile with no two bulkheads the same shape and a skin formed into compound curves, which was expensive to build. Manufacturers have since favored tube-shaped fuselages in airliner designs, as the cylindrical cross-section design is more resistant to pressurization changes and less expensive to build.

After ending Constellation production, Lockheed chose not to develop a first-generation jetliner, sticking to its military business and production of the turboprop Lockheed L-188 Electra. Lockheed did not build a large passenger aircraft again until its L-1011 Tristar debuted in 1972. While a technological marvel, the L-1011 was a commercial failure, and Lockheed left the commercial airliner business permanently in 1983.

== Variants ==
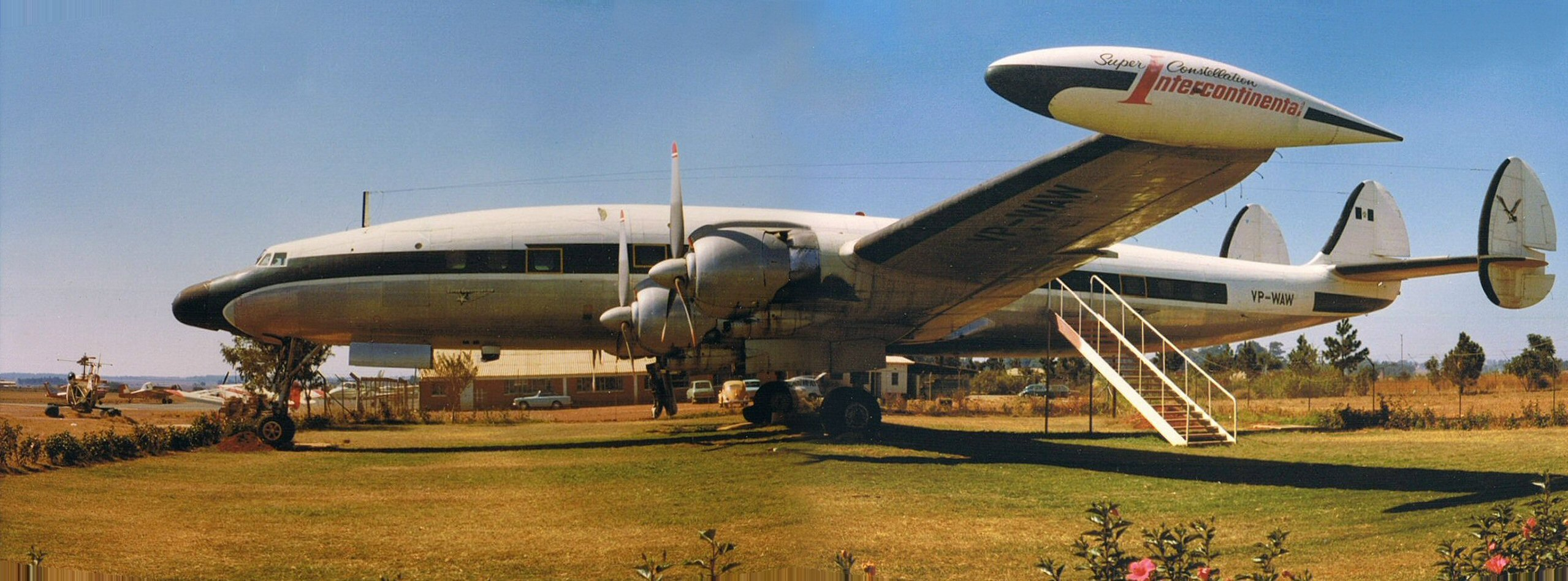
Super Constellation at Charles Prince Airport, Rhodesia (now Zimbabwe) in 1975, used as a flying club headquarters

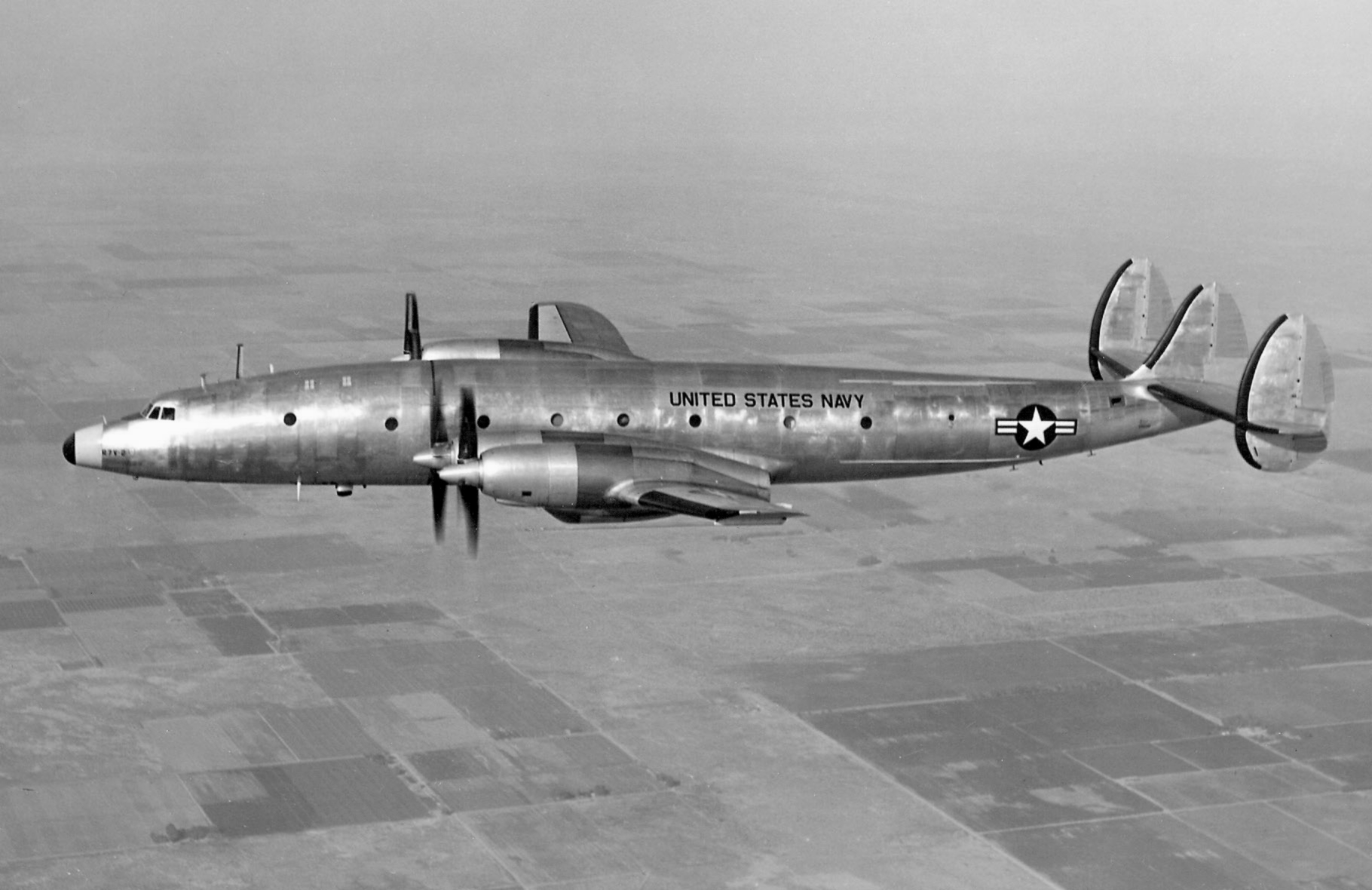
A United States Navy R7V-2 (L-1249) in flight: The L-1249 used Pratt & Whitney T34 turboprop engines in place of the Wright R-3350 radials.

The initial military versions carried the Lockheed designation of L-049; as World War II came to a close, some were completed as civilian L-049 Constellations followed by the L-149 (L-049 modified to carry more fuel tanks).

The first purpose-built passenger Constellations were the more powerful L-649 and L-749 (which had more fuel in the outer wings), L-849 (an unbuilt model to use the R-3350 turbo-compound engines adopted for the L-1049 ), L-949 (an unbuilt, high-density seating-cum-freighter type, what would come to be called a "combi aircraft").

These were followed by the L-1049 Super Constellation (with longer fuselage), L-1149 (proposal to use Allison turbine engines) and L-1249 (similar to L-1149, built as R7V-2/YC-121F), L-1449 (unbuilt proposal for L1049G, stretched 55 in (140 cm), with new wing and turbines) and L-1549 (unbuilt project to stretch L-1449 95 in (240 cm)).

The final civilian variant was the L-1649 Starliner (all new wing and L1049G fuselage).

Military versions included the C-69 and C-121 for the Army Air Forces/Air Force and the R7O R7V-1 (L-1049B) EC-121 WV-1 (L-749A) WV-2 (L-1049B) (widely known as the Willie Victor) and many variant EC-121 designations for the Navy.

== Operators ==
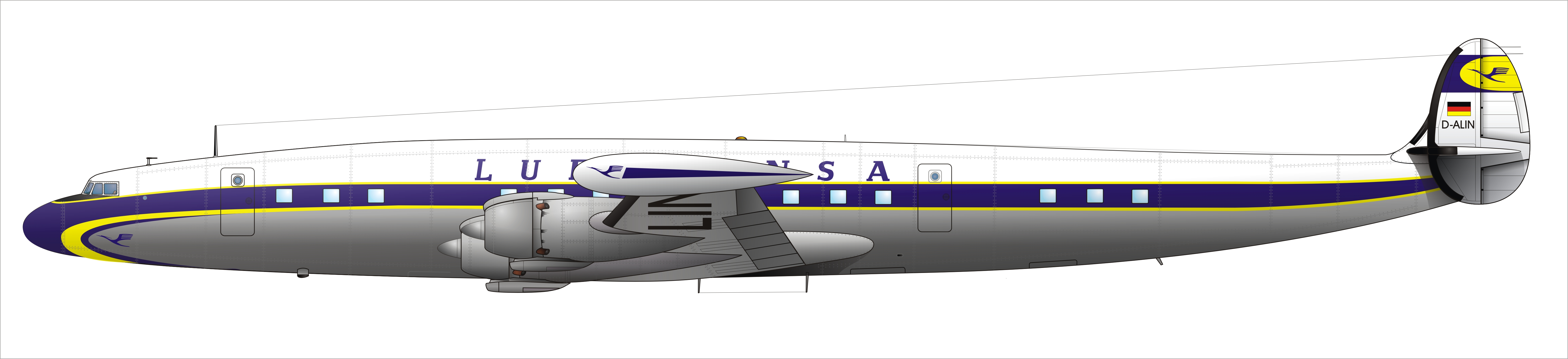
Lockheed Super Constellation of Lufthansa.

After TWA's initial order was filled following World War II, customers rapidly accumulated, with over 800 aircraft built. In military service, the U.S. Navy and Air Force operated the EC-121 Warning Star variant until 1978, nearly 40 years after work on the L-049 began. Cubana de Aviación was the first airline in Latin America to operate Super Constellations.

== Surviving aircraft ==
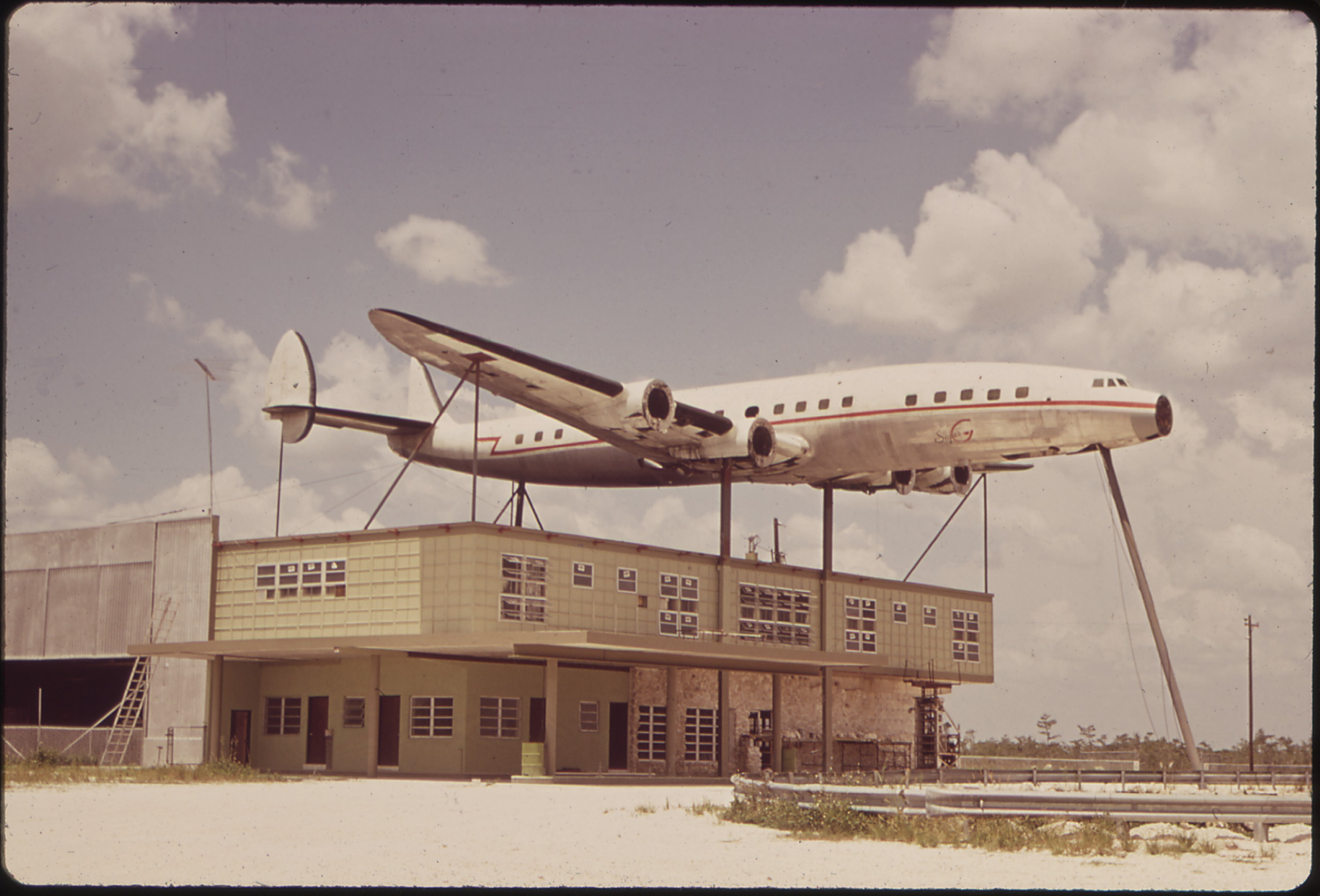
Constellation fuselage on display on Oasis gas station, Tamiami Trail Florida, 1971

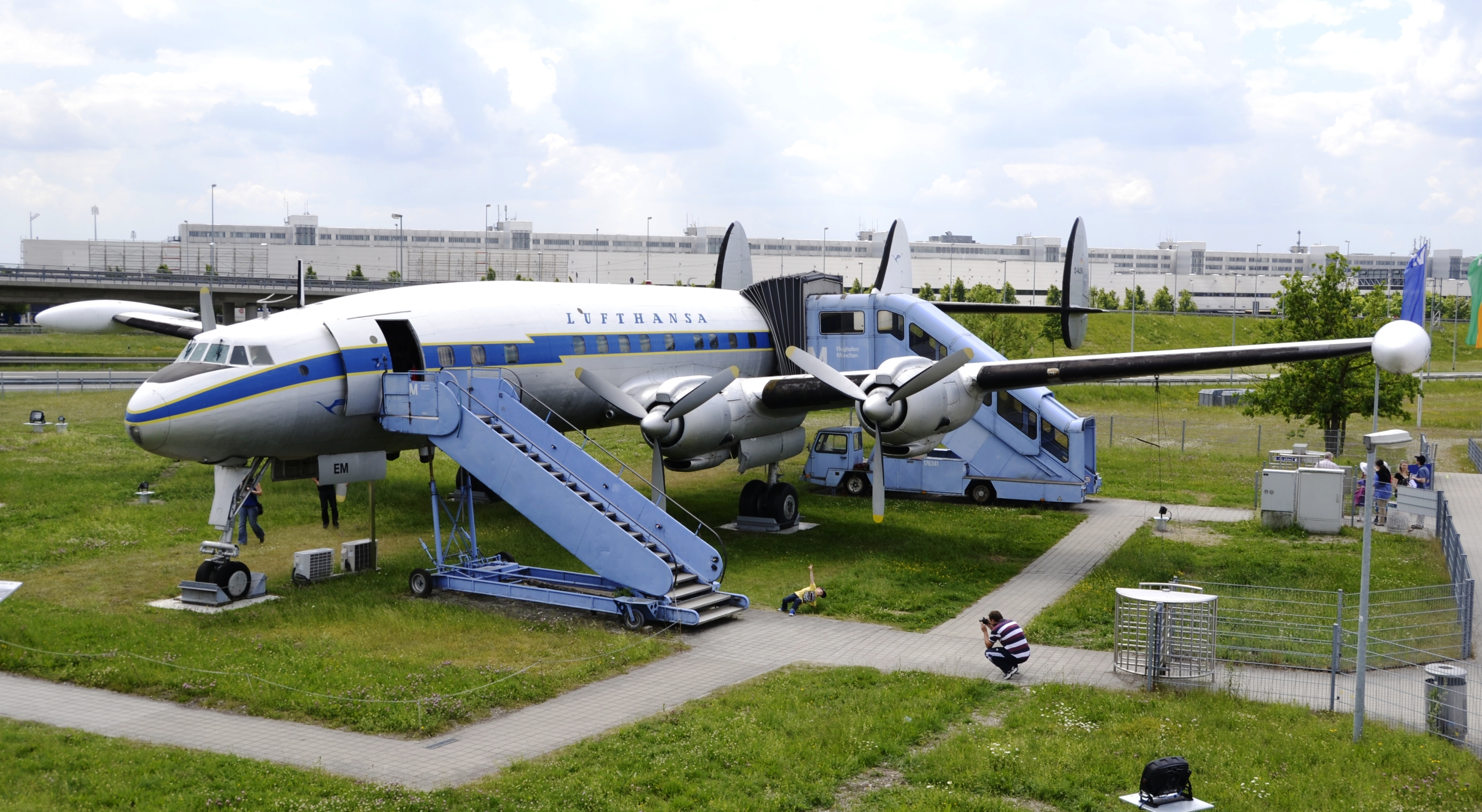
Lockheed L-1049G Super Constellation D-ALEM on display close to Munich International Airport

=== Commercial ===
On display

L-049

- N90831 – on display at the Pima Air & Space Museum in Tucson, Arizona. This is a former C-69 transport, s/n 42-94549, that was converted for civilian service, and was one of the first TWA Constellations.
- N86533 – on display at the TAM Museum, located in São Carlos, Brazil. Previously, it served as a children's attraction at the entrance of Silvio Pettirossi International Airport in Asunción, Paraguay. It is painted in the markings of Panair do Brasil.
- N9412H – parked adjacent to a flight school and cafe at Greenwood Lake Airport in West Milford, New Jersey. It was delivered as Air France's first Constellation in June 1946 as L-049 F-BAZA, before being sold to Frank Lembo Enterprises in May 1976 for $45,000 for use as a restaurant and lounge. It was flown to the airport in July 1977, and, along with the airport, was sold to the State of New Jersey in 2000. In 2005, the interior was refurbished for use as a flight school office.
- N2520B – on display in Aerosur livery, on the first ring road in Santa Cruz de la Sierra, Bolivia. It is known as El Avión Pirata.

L-749

- F-ZVMV – on display at the Musée de l'Air et de l'Espace (The Museum of Air and Space) located at Paris-Le Bourget Airport near Le Bourget, France, 10 km north of Paris. It initially served with Pan American Airways, before being transferred to Air France, with which it served until 1960. Afterwards, it was used by the Compagnie Générale des Turbo-Machines (General Company of Turbomachinery) as an engine testbed until December 1974.

L-1049 Super Constellation

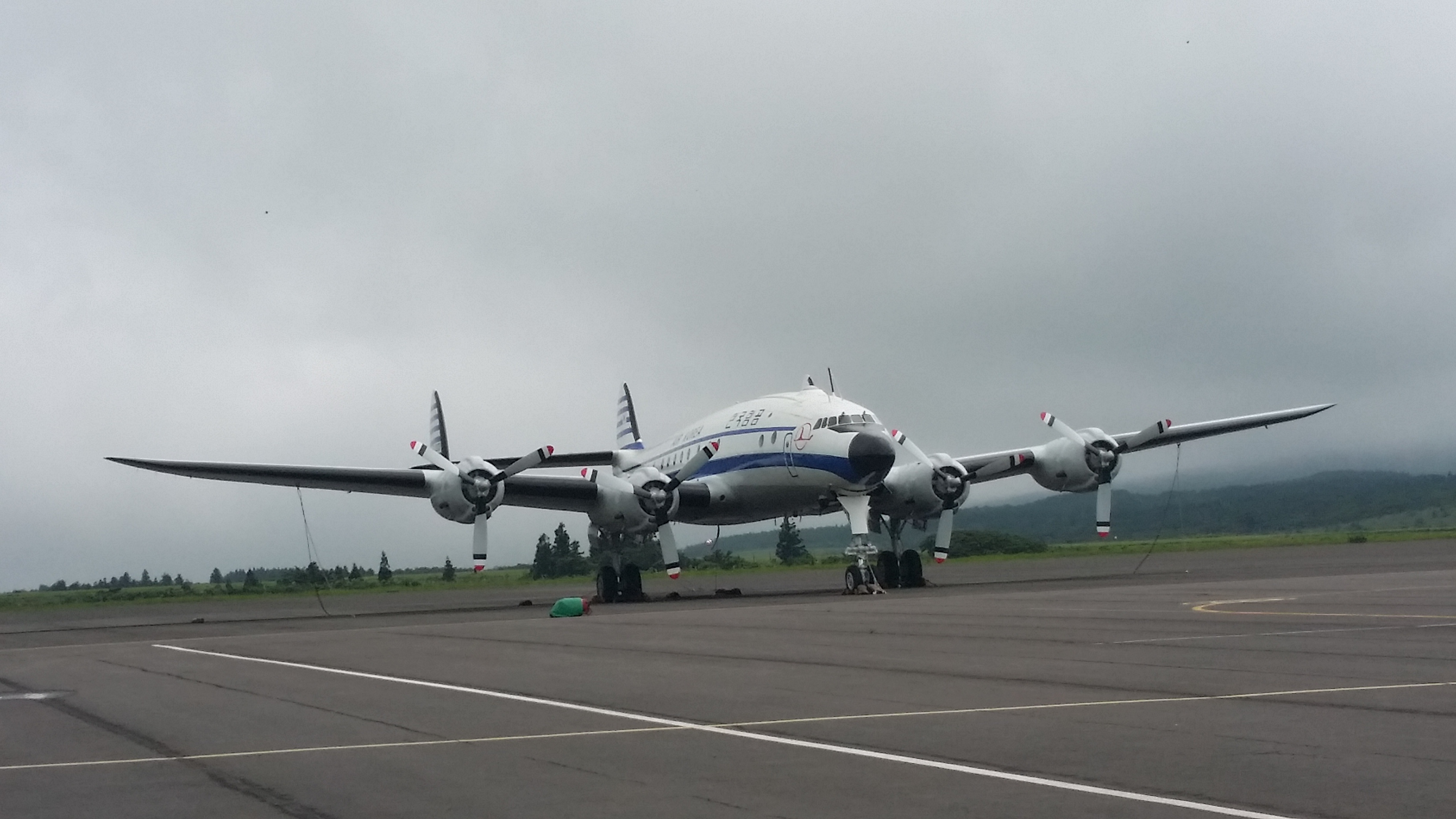
Korea Air L-1049 on display at Jeju island the former N494TW painted as HL4003

- CF-TGE – on display at the Museum of Flight in Seattle, Washington. It is painted in the markings it carried during its service with Trans-Canada Air Lines from 1954 to the 1960s. After TCA service, it was sold to World Wide Airways and later retired in Montreal by 1965; it was renovated as a restaurant and bar in and around the Montreal area, and sold and moved again to Toronto and used as convention facility by the Regal Constellation Hotel. It was sold again and stored at Toronto Pearson International Airport. Finally, it was sold to the Museum of Flight, restored in Rome, New York, and shipped to Seattle for display.
- 44-0315 – on display at the Air Mobility Command Museum at Dover Air Force Base in Dover, Delaware. Last registered N1005C it is painted to represent a USAF C-121C, but was never actually delivered to the air force.
- D-ALIN – on display at the Flugausstellung Hermeskeil, near Hermeskeil, Germany. It is a former Lufthansa Super Constellation, and was the actual aircraft that Konrad Adenauer flew into Moscow in 1955, when he negotiated the release of German POWs.
- D-ALEM – on display near Munich International Airport at Munich, Germany. Last registered F-BHML it is painted to represent Super Constellation D-ALEM, Lufthansa's first long-haul aircraft of 1955.
- IN315 – on display at the Naval Aviation Museum at Dabolim in Goa, India. This aircraft is a former Air India Super Constellation (VT-DHM Rani of Ellora) that was later transferred to the Indian Navy

L-1649 Starliner

- N974R – on display in front of the Fantasy of Flight attraction in Lakeland, Florida.
- ZS-DVJ – on display at Rand Airport in Germiston in Trek Airways colours. Used to be at OR Tambo International Airport, South Africa at the South African Airways Technical area. The aircraft is owned by the South African Airways Museum Society.
- N8083H – This aircraft was purchased at auction in 2007, along with C/N 1018, by the Deutsche Lufthansa Berlin Foundation, and stripped of all usable spares to support the restoration of C/N 1018. The aircraft was subsequently sold and transported to JFK International Airport to become a cocktail bar in the TWA Hotel, a retro-aviation themed hotel built on the former TWA Flight Center.

Under restoration or in storage

L-049

- N7777G – painted in TWA colors (although this aircraft never flew for TWA) it is stored at the Large Item Storage facility for the UK Science Museum at Wroughton, near Swindon. This aircraft was used by the Rolling Stones to transport equipment during their 1973 Australian tour. It is the only Constellation in the United Kingdom.

L-1049 Super Constellation

- F-BRAD – to display by the Amicale du Super Constellation located at the Nantes Airport in Nantes, France. It was delivered to Air France on November 2, 1953, and was upgraded to a L-1049 G in 1956, serving until August 8, 1967, having totaled 24,284 hours under Air France's colors. After retirement, it was sent to Spain, to be registered EC-BEN, briefly flying humanitarian and medevac missions in Biafra. Aero Fret bought it in 1968, brought it back home to France, registered it as F-BRAD, and operated it on cargo hauls until 1974. When the Constellation landed in Nantes one last time to be scrapped, it was ultimately saved by Mr. Gaborit, who revamped it somewhat by his own modest means to finally park it near the terminal, accessible to visitors for a few years, until the Chamber of Commerce and Industry of the Nantes-Atlantique Airport bought it, to contract the Amicale du Super Constellation to undergo a complete restoration of the aircraft.
- HI-542CT City of Miami – parked on an unused runway at the Rafael Hernández Airport in Aguadilla, Puerto Rico. It was struck by a runaway DC-4 on February 3, 1992, resulting in damage to the right wing and main spar.
- N6937C Star of America – to airworthiness by the National Airline History Museum in Kansas City, Missouri. This aircraft was originally built in 1957, stored for several years, and then delivered to cargo carrier Slick Airways. It was restored in 1986 by the Save-a-Connie, Inc. organization, later renamed as the National Airline History Museum. It was originally painted in red and white with Save-a-Connie, but was later repainted in the 1950s livery of TWA to resemble its original Star of America Constellation. The aircraft appeared at New York's John F. Kennedy International Airport at the original TWA terminal designed by Eero Saarinen to commemorate the 75th anniversary of the airline with the paint scheme donated by TWA in Kansas City for the occasion. The Star of America has appeared at many airshows and was even used in The Aviator, the 2004 film depicting the life of TWA's one-time owner Howard Hughes, the man often credited with helping design and develop the original Constellation series.

L-1649 Starliner

- N7316C – returned to airworthiness by Lufthansa Technik North America in Auburn, Maine. This aircraft was purchased at auction in 2007, along with C/N 1038, by the Deutsche Lufthansa Berlin Foundation. Lufthansa has built a hangar at the airport, which will allow the aircraft to be restored indoors. Lufthansa announced in March 2018 that it will be transported back to Germany and further restoration decisions will be made after it arrives. As of the end of 2019 the plan is to restore the aircraft for static display in a museum. According to reports from the US, the aircraft was dismantled (as apparently was the Ju-52 D-AQUI) without the requisite documentation that would have allowed the return-to-flight work to continue.

=== Military ===
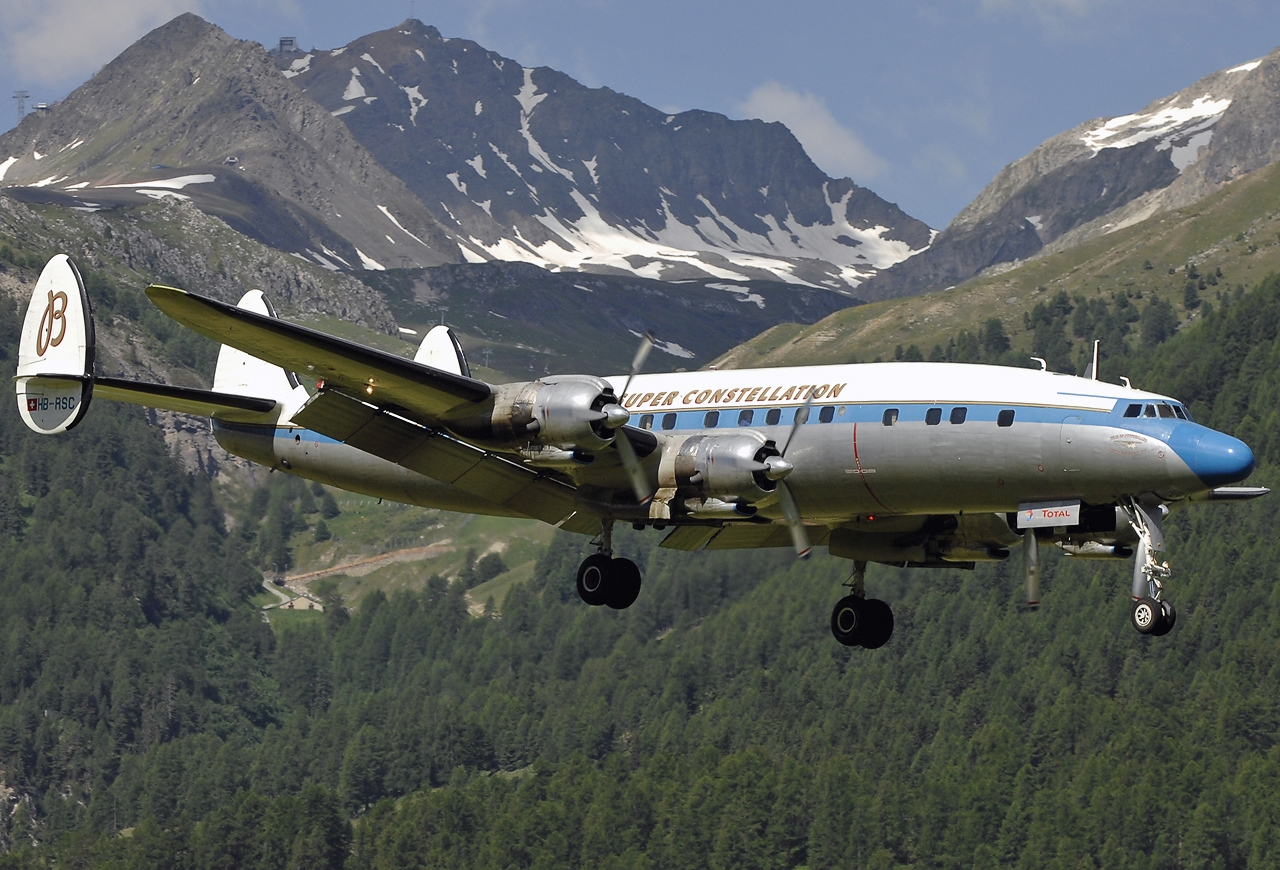
The Breitling Super Constellation

Airworthy

C-121C

- S/N 54-0156 – Flies with the Super Constellation Flyers Association out of Basel, as the Breitling Super Constellation. Its restoration was sponsored by Swiss watch manufacturer Breitling, and is now registered in the Swiss Aircraft registry as HB-RSC. This Constellation is one of three flying in the world.

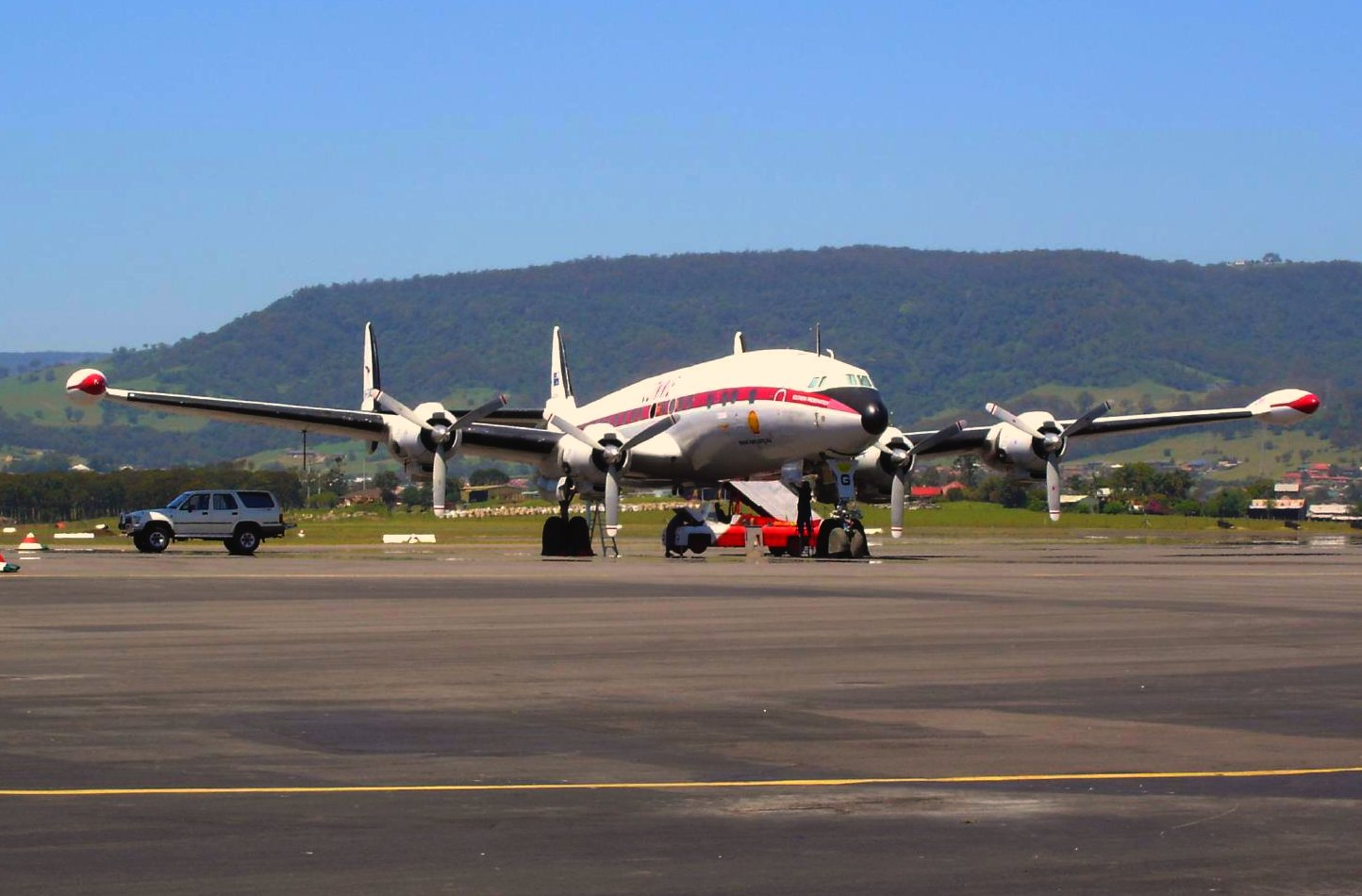
HARS Super Connie at Wollongong, 2004

- S/N 54-0157 – Flies with the Historical Aircraft Restoration Society (HARS) out of Shellharbour Airport near Wollongong, Australia. Following its restoration, it was painted in pseudo-Qantas livery, including the Qantas logo on the tail, (with the usual Qantas lettering along the fuselage and on the wing-end fuel tanks replaced with the word "CONNIE") and registered as VH-EAG. This Constellation is one of the other of three flying in the world.
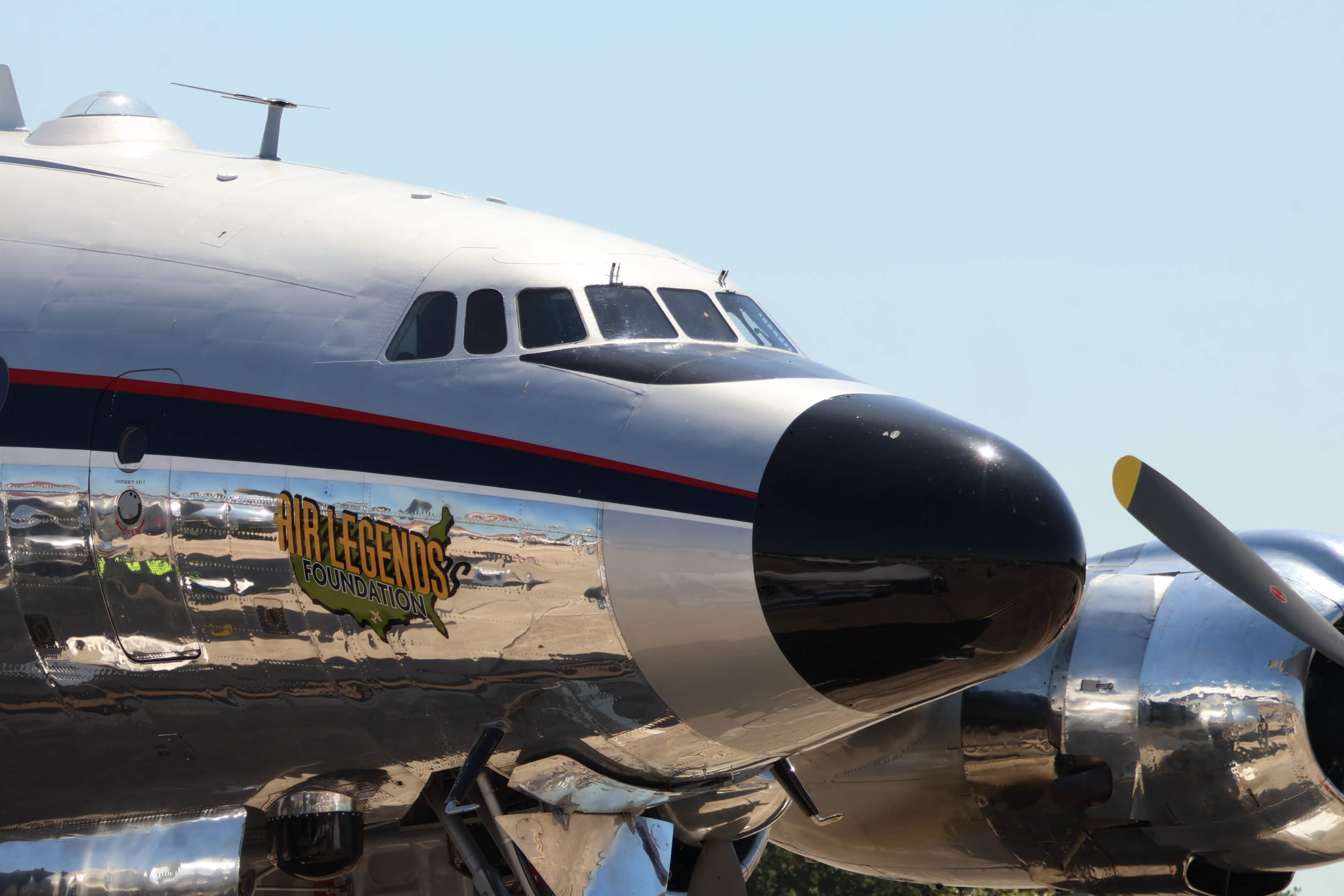
- Lockheed VC-121A Constellation "Bataan"
  S/N 48-0613 Bataan – Restored to airworthiness by Lewis Air Legends in San Antonio, Texas. This aircraft was used as a personal transport by General Douglas MacArthur during the Korean War, and later by other Army general officers until 1966, when it was transferred to NASA. Following its permanent retirement in 1970, it was placed on display at a museum at Fort Rucker near Daleville, Alabama. It was acquired by the Planes of Fame Air Museum at Chino, California, in 1992, and overhauled into airworthy condition for a flight to Dothan, Alabama, where it received additional work. After a thorough restoration back to its original configuration with a "VIP interior", it was placed on display at the Planes of Fame secondary location in Valle, Arizona. Then, in 2015, it was sold to Lewis Air Legends, and prepped for a ferry flight to Chino, arriving there on January 14, 2016. On June 20, 2023, the Air Legends Foundation’s Lockheed VC-121A Constellation took off on its first post-restoration flight from Chino Airport. The aircraft flew to the 2023 EAA AirVenture Oshkosh in Oshkosh, Wisconsin. In July 2025, the aircraft completed a six year long custom executive VIP interior designed by Aerometal International, based in Aurora, Oregon. In late July, 2025, Bataan returned to visit EAA AirVenture Oshkosh in Oshkosh, Wisconsin.

On display

- N8083H – L-1649A on display at the TWA Hotel at John F. Kennedy International Airport in New York City, restored as a 1960s-themed cocktail lounge known as the "Connie Cocktail Lounge". Formerly used by TWA and restored in 2018–2019.

VC-121A

- S/N 48-0609 – on display at Jeongseok Airport on Jeju Island, South Korea. It was donated to Korean Air in 2005, and restored to airworthy condition at Tucson, Arizona. It was then ferried to South Korea, where it made its final flight, under its own power, from Seoul to its current location for static display. It has been repainted in 1950s Korean Air colors, and rendered unable to fly by the presence of unserviceable engines.

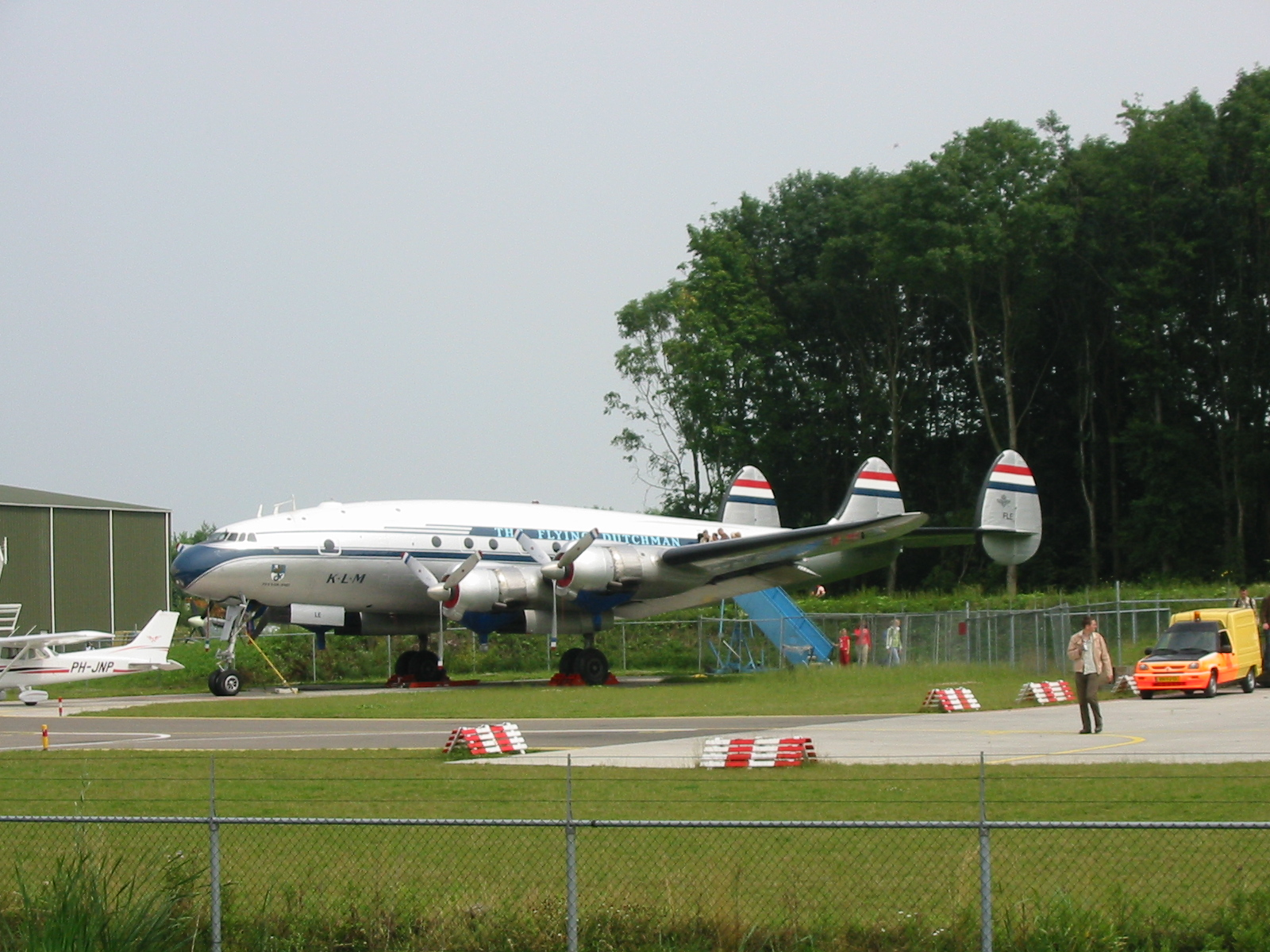
L-749A restored at Aviodrome

- S/N 48-0612 – on display at the Dutch National Aviation Museum Aviodrome. It was restored to airworthy condition and ferried from Tucson, Arizona, to the Netherlands, where restoration continued. It is now painted in the KLM livery of the 1950s, depicting a KLM Lockheed L-749A. Renamed Flevoland, this was the only airworthy example of the "short" version of the Constellation until an engine failure grounded the aircraft.
- S/N 48-0614 Columbine – on display at the Pima Air and Space Museum in Tucson, Arizona. This aircraft was used by Dwight D. Eisenhower during his role as Supreme Headquarters Allied Powers Europe commander before he became president. It is on loan from the National Museum of the U.S. Air Force.

VC-121E

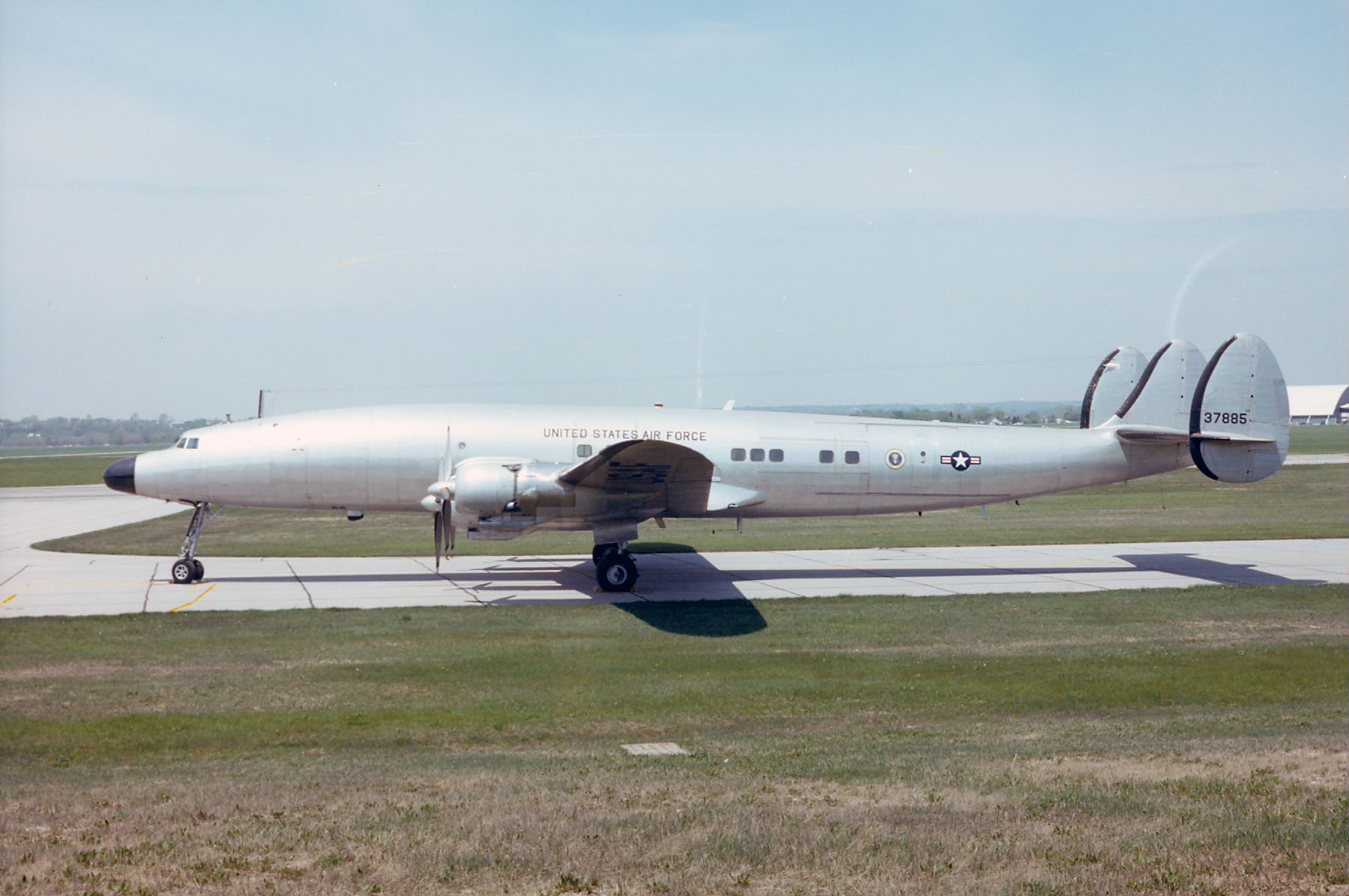
Dwight D. Eisenhower flew in three Constellations, named Columbine, Columbine II, and Columbine III.

- S/N 53-7885 Columbine III – on display at the National Museum of the United States Air Force at Wright-Patterson Air Force Base near Dayton, Ohio. Columbine III was used as Dwight D. Eisenhower's presidential aircraft, and was eventually retired to the museum in 1966, where it is now displayed in the museum's Presidential Gallery (Building 4). The interior of the aircraft is open to the public.

C-121C

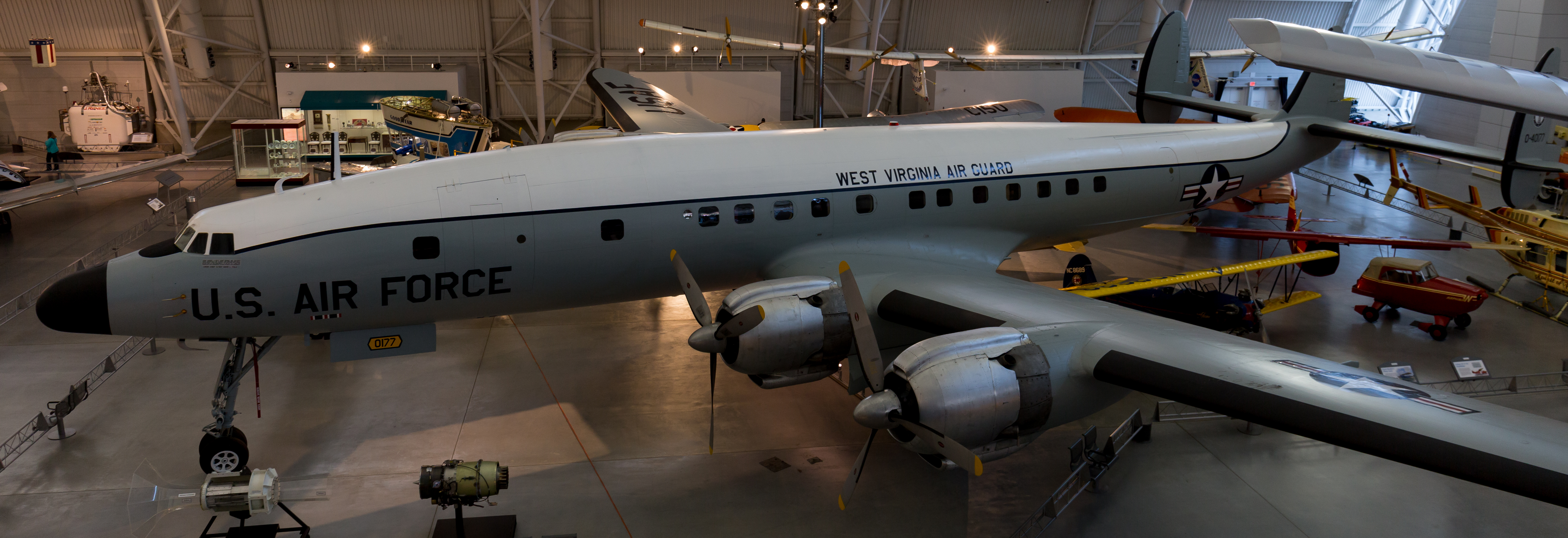
C-121 on display at the Udvar-Hazy Center

- S/N 54-0155 – on display at Lackland Air Force Base near San Antonio, Texas
- S/N 54-0177 – on display at the National Air and Space Museum, Udvar-Hazy Center located at Dulles Airport in Virginia.
- S/N 54-0180 – on display at Charleston Air Force Base near North Charleston, South Carolina.

C-121J

- BuNo 131643 – From March 2020 onwards, the aircraft is on static display at the Qantas Founders Museum. Formerly stored in derelict condition at Ninoy Aquino International Airport in Manila, Philippines and impounded at the airport from June 1988 to September 2014, when it was secured for removal and static preservation by the Qantas Founders Outback Museum, Longreach.

EC-121K

- BuNo 137890 – on display at Tinker Air Force Base near Oklahoma City, Oklahoma.
- BuNo 141297 – on display at the Museum of Aviation at Robins Air Force Base near Warner Robins, Georgia.
- BuNo 141309 – on display at the Aerospace Museum of California at the former McClellan Air Force Base in North Highlands, California. This aircraft is a former navy aircraft on loan from the National Museum of the United States Air Force. It is painted in the markings of a USAF EC-121 Warning Star.
- BuNo 141311 – on display at the Chanute Aerospace Museum at the former Chanute AFB in Rantoul, Illinois.
- BuNo 143221 – on display at the National Museum of Naval Aviation at NAS Pensacola near Pensacola, Florida.

EC-121T

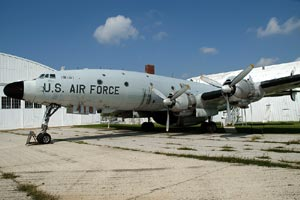
N4257U on display at the Combat Air Museum in Topeka

- S/N 52-3418 – on display at the Combat Air Museum in Topeka, Kansas. This aircraft was delivered to the Air Force in October 1954. It served an additional 22 years, until it was retired and flown to Davis Monthan AFB for storage on April 7, 1976. It June 1981, it was ferried to Topeka, Kansas, with Frank Lang in command.
- S/N 52-3425 – on display at the Peterson Air and Space Museum at Peterson AFB in Colorado Springs, Colorado. Previously assigned to the 966th AEWCS at McCoy AFB, Florida, and then the 79th AEWCS at Homestead AFB, Florida. It was the last operational EC-121 and was deployed by the 79th AEWCS to NAS Keflavik, Iceland. It was delivered to Peterson AFB in October 1978.
- S/N 53-0548 – on display at the Yanks Air Museum in Chino, California. Stored at Camarillo Airport, from 2000 to 2012, this aircraft made its final flight, to Chino, on January 14, 2012.
- S/N 53-0554 – on display at the Pima Air & Space Museum in Tucson, Arizona. As of April 6, 2014, it is undergoing restoration on its radome.
- S/N 53-0555 – on display at the National Museum of the United States Air Force at Wright-Patterson Air Force Base near Dayton, Ohio, in the museum's Southeast Asia Gallery (Building 2).

Under restoration or in storage

WV-1

- BuNo 124438 – to airworthiness by Gordon Cole at Salina, Kansas. This aircraft was the first of two WV-1s delivered to the U.S. Navy in 1949. Essentially, it was a prototype for the EC-121 Warning Star that followed. Retired from the Navy in 1957, it served the FAA from 1958 to 1966, before being flown to Salina in 1967 for retirement. It remains parked there, and was last flown in 1992.

VC-121A

- S/N 48-0610 Columbine II – to airworthiness by Dynamic Aviation in Bridgewater, Virginia. This aircraft served as the first Air Force One, during the presidency of Dwight D. Eisenhower, before it was replaced by Columbine III as Eisenhower's primary presidential aircraft in 1954. After a long period of storage at Marana Regional Airport, near Tucson, Arizona, this aircraft made its first flight, since 2003, in March 2016, when it was ferried to Bridgewater for additional restoration.

EC-121T

- S/N 51-3417 – Sister ship to -3418 (Combat Air Museum) on display at the Castle Air Museum of Atwater, California, in 2014.

== Specifications (L-1049G Super Constellation) ==
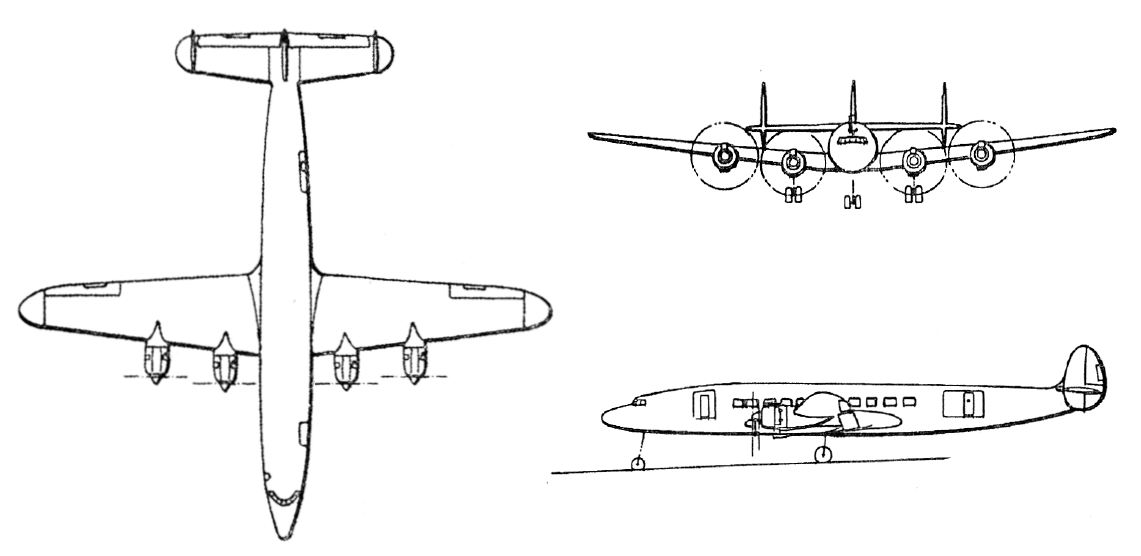
Lockheed C-121C (L-1049) Super Constellation.

Data from Great Aircraft of the World and Quest for Performance

General characteristics

- Crew: 5 flight crew, varying cabin crew
- Capacity: typically 62–95 passengers (109 in high-density configuration) / 18,300 lb (8,301 kg) payload
- Length: 116 ft 2 in (35.41 m)
- Wingspan: 126 ft 2 in (38.46 m)
- Height: 24 ft 9 in (7.54 m)
- Wing area: 1,654 sq ft (153.7 m^{2})
- Aspect ratio: 9.17
- Airfoil: root: NACA 23018; tip: NACA 4412
- Empty weight: 79,700 lb (36,151 kg)
- Max takeoff weight: 137,500 lb (62,369 kg)
- Zero-lift drag coefficient: C_{D,0} = 0.0211
- Drag area: 34.82 ft^{2} (3.235 m^{2})
- Powerplant: 4 × Wright R-3350-DA3 Duplex-Cyclone 18 cylinder air-cooled turbocharged radial piston engines, 3,250 hp (2,420 kW) each
- Propellers: 3-bladed constant-speed propellers

Performance

- Maximum speed: 377 mph (607 km/h, 328 kn)
- Cruise speed: 340 mph (550 km/h, 300 kn) at 22,600 ft (6,888 m)
- Stall speed: 100 mph (160 km/h, 87 kn)
- Range: 5,400 mi (8,700 km, 4,700 nmi)
- Service ceiling: 24,000 ft (7,300 m)
- Rate of climb: 1,620 ft/min (8.2 m/s)
- Lift-to-drag: 16
- Wing loading: 87.7 lb/sq ft (428 kg/m^{2})
- Power/mass: 0.094 hp/lb (0.155 kW/kg)

== See also ==
Related development

- L-049 Constellation
- C-69 Constellation
- L-649 Constellation
- L-749 Constellation
- L-1049 Super Constellation
- C-121/R7V Constellation
- L-1249 Super Constellation (R7V-2/YC-121F)
- L-1649A Starliner

Aircraft of comparable role, configuration, and era

- Boeing 377
- Douglas DC-4E
- Douglas DC-6
- Douglas DC-7
- Bristol Britannia

Related lists

- List of Lockheed aircraft
- List of Lockheed Constellation variants
- List of military aircraft of the United States
- List of United States Navy aircraft designations (pre-1962)
