= Lockheed Model 44 Excalibur =

Proposed American airliner

Model 44 Excalibur

General information
- Type: 32-passenger airliner
- National origin: United States
- Manufacturer: Lockheed Corporation
- Status: Canceled
- Number built: None

The Lockheed Model 44 Excalibur was a proposed American airliner designed by Lockheed. The Model 44 was the first four-engined design from the company, a low-wing monoplane with a retractable tricycle landing gear. Originally fitted with twin fins, the design ended up with three fins. It was to be powered by four 1,200 hp (890 kW) Pratt & Whitney Twin Wasp radial engines. Pan American Airways was close to ordering the Excalibur when Lockheed abandoned the project to devote its resources to developing the Model 49 Constellation that had been ordered by Trans World Airlines.

== Design and development ==
In the late 1930s, American aircraft companies such as Boeing and Douglas started developing airliners capable of carrying more passengers at longer ranges than any previous airliner. Douglas, which had the majority of the airliner market with its DC-3, was having trouble finding customers for its proposed Douglas DC-4E (not to be confused with the later DC-4).

Around this time, the Lockheed Aircraft Corporation was studying different airliner projects. The first was the Model 27, which had a canard configuration. The other two were the L-104 and L-105. The L-105 was smaller, with 1,200 hp (890 kW) engines, and was more conventional than the L-104. These studies led Lockheed's Burbank facility to settle on a design dubbed Model 44, a four-engined airliner that was announced to the public in April 1939. Soon afterwards, the new airliner was dubbed Excalibur. The Excalibur resembled an enlarged Model 10 Electra. It would be powered by four Wright GR-1820 Cyclone 9 radial engines, rated at 1,000 hp (750 kW), or four Pratt & Whitney R-1830 Twin Wasp radials. Its wingspan was 95 ft 9 in (29.18 m), its length was 82 ft 6 in (25.15 m), and its projected maximum speed was in the 250–280 mph (400–450 km/h) range. Several variants were proposed, to accommodate different passenger loads.

The original Excalibur design envisioned a 21-passenger payload, with a 240 mph (390 km/h) cruising speed. This was revised to 36 passengers at 268 mph (431 km/h) cruise at 12,000 ft (3,700 m) altitude. This change included increasing the fuselage diameter, making it comparable to the Model 18 Lodestar, and increasing the wingspan to 95 ft 9 in (29.18 m) with an area of 1,000 sq ft (93 m^{2}). A tricycle landing gear with steerable nosewheel was envisioned. With the revised specifications, the Excalibur could now effectively compete with the near monopoly Douglas had on the airliner market. Its projected performance was better (except in range) than the Boeing 307 Stratoliner. The revision of specifications was partially due to a request from Pan American Airlines; their influence also caused the addition of the third tailfin. A variant designated the L-144, able to carry 40 passengers was planned, but was ultimately cancelled even though South African Airways had placed a potential order for two examples. Lockheed proceeded with a full-scale mockup of the proposed Excalibur, including most of the airliner except the right wing.

The eccentric billionaire Howard Hughes, who recently gained ownership of Transcontinental & Western Air (dubbed TWA for short), decided to provide funding for the new Excalibur. He had a plan in mind to vastly improve the characteristics of the Excalibur by increasing comfort, speed and profit of the aircraft. It was thus that Hughes invited three workers from Lockheed and Jack Frye (president of TWA) to a meeting at his Hancock Park residence. The Lockheed employees included Clarence "Kelly" Johnson and Robert E. Gross. Hughes expressed his requirements for the "airliner of the future": a payload of 36 passengers (or 20 sleeping berths), a six-person crew, a 3,600 mi (5,800 km) range, a 300 mph (480 km/h) cruise speed, and a weight of 52,000–55,000 lb; 23,500–25,000 kg (23.5–25 t). This meant that the Excalibur would have to get a 100 mph (160 km/h) increase in speed and be able to fly 1,000 ft (300 m) higher. It would need to cross the United States nonstop. The first decision was to re-engine the Excalibur with Wright R-2600 radials, which had not been tested yet. The next decision was to start from scratch while saving the overall shape and triple tail configuration of the original Excalibur.

The new design differed so much from the original Excalibur, that a different model designation was needed. It was first given the temporary designation L-104, then it was later officially designated the Model 49 or "Excalibur A". In time, the Model 49 would become a completely different aircraft from the original Model 44. Lockheed later dropped the name "Excalibur" as the new airliner had little to do with its predecessor. The end result was the Lockheed L-049 Constellation.

== Specifications ==
Data from

General characteristics

- Crew: two
- Capacity: 32 passengers
- Length: 74 ft 11.5 in (22.847 m)
- Wingspan: 95 ft 0 in (28.96 m)
- Wing area: 1,000 sq ft (93 m^{2})
- Empty weight: 26,424 lb (11,986 kg)
- Gross weight: 40,000 lb (18,144 kg)
- Powerplant: 4 × Pratt & Whitney Twin Wasp S4C-4-G piston engine , 1,200 hp (890 kW) each

Performance

== See also ==
Aircraft of comparable role, configuration, and era

- Douglas DC-4E
- Douglas DC-6
- Lockheed Constellation
