= Lockheed XB-30 =

American bomber project

- Scale model of the Lockheed XB-30 bomber concept.

General information
- Type: Heavy bomber
- Manufacturer: Lockheed Corporation
- Status: Design only
- Primary user: United States Army Air Forces
- Number built: 0

History
- First flight: n/a
- Developed from: L-049 Constellation

The Lockheed XB-30 (company model L-249) was the design submitted by Lockheed after the request by the United States Army Air Forces for a very heavy bomber, the same request that led to the Boeing B-29 Superfortress, the Douglas XB-31 and Consolidated B-32 Dominator.

== Design and development ==
Around 1938, General Henry H. "Hap" Arnold, the head of the United States Army Air Corps, was growing alarmed at the possibility of war in Europe and in the Pacific. Hoping to be prepared for the long-term requirements of the Air Corps, Arnold created a special committee chaired by Brigadier General Walter G. Kilner; one of its members was Charles Lindbergh. After a tour of Luftwaffe bases, Lindbergh became convinced that Nazi Germany was far ahead of other European nations.

In a 1939 report, the committee made a number of recommendations, including development of new long-range heavy bombers. When war broke out in Europe, Arnold requested design studies from several companies on a Very Long-Range bomber capable of traveling 5,000 miles (8,000 km). Approval was granted on 2 December 1939.

Based on the design of the Lockheed L-049 (subsequently adopted by the United States Army Air Forces as the C-69), the L-249 never progressed past the design stage, mainly because Boeing had a head start with its Boeing B-29 Superfortress, using the same Wright R-3350 Duplex-Cyclone radials as the XB-30 was intended to use. Only a scale model was built. Retaining the wings and tail surfaces of the Model 49, the Model 249-58-01 was to have had a new fuselage with up to six gun turrets (one in the nose, two above and two below the fuselage, and one in the tail) housing ten .50-caliber guns—twinned up in each turret for the nose, dorsal, and ventral emplacements; and one 20-mm cannon for the tail defensive position. Ventral bomb bays were to accommodate eight 2,000 lb (910 kg) bombs.

== Specifications (as proposed) ==
General characteristics

- Crew: 12
- Length: 104 ft 8 in (31.91 m)
- Wingspan: 123 ft 0 in (37.50 m)
- Height: 23 ft 9 in (7.25 m)
- Wing area: 1,646 sq ft (153 m^{2})
- Empty weight: 51,616 lb (23,462 kg)
- Gross weight: 85,844 lb (39,020 kg)
- Max takeoff weight: 93,808 lb (42,640 kg)
- Powerplant: 4 × Wright R-3350-13 radial engines, 2200 hp (1600 kW) each

Performance

- Maximum speed: 382 mph (615 km/h, 332 kn)
- Range: 5,333 mi (8,045 km, 4,634 nmi)
- Service ceiling: 17,832 ft (5,440 m)
- Wing loading: 52 lb/sq ft (255 kg/m^{2})
- Power/mass: 0.10 hp/lb (170 W/kg)

Armament

- Guns:
  - 8× .50 in (12.7 mm) machine guns in four fuselage turrets
  - 2× .50 in (12.7 mm) machine guns and
  - 1× 20 mm cannon in remotely aimed tail turret
- Bombs: 16,000 lb

== See also ==
Related development

- Lockheed Constellation

Aircraft of comparable role, configuration, and era

- Boeing B-29 Superfortress
- Consolidated B-32 Dominator
- Douglas XB-31
- Heinkel He 277
- Messerschmitt Me 264

Related lists

- List of Lockheed aircraft
