= Banco de Crédito de Bolivia =

Bolivian bank

Banco de Crédito de Bolivia S.A.

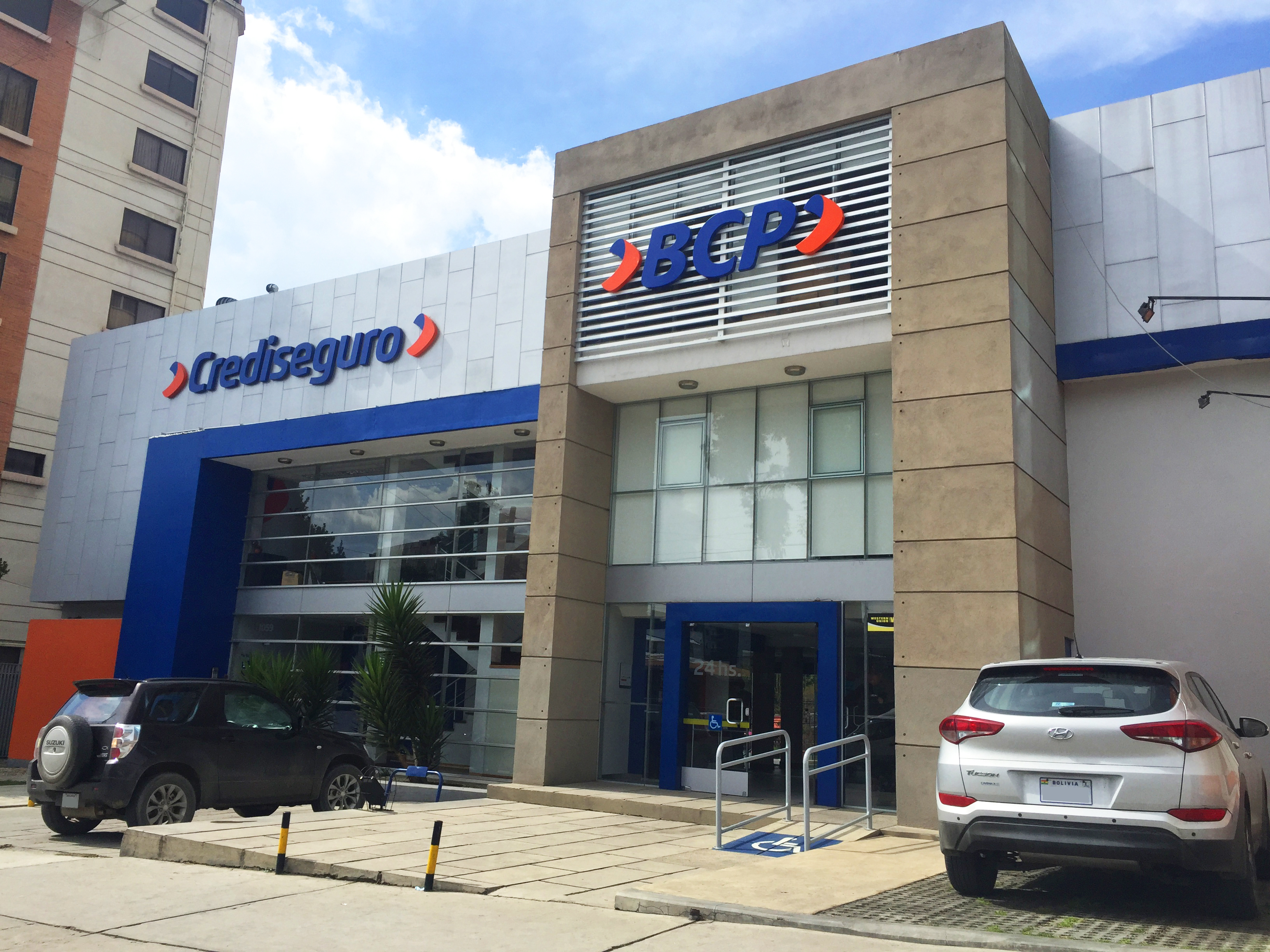
- Agency of the bank in La Paz.
- Company type: Sociedad Anónima
- Traded as: BBV: BTB
- Founded: 1994; 32 years ago, by merger of Banco Popular into Banco de Credito del Peru
- Headquarters: La Paz, Bolivia
- Key people: Dionisio Romero Paoletti (Chairman); Walter Bayly Llona (Vice president) (2013)
- Products: Consumer banking, corporate banking, credit cards, investment banking, mortgage loans mutual funds.
- Revenue: ▼ Bs. 535 million (2013)
- Operating income: ▼ Bs. 117 million (2013)
- Net income: ▼ Bs. 87.20 million (2013)
- Total assets: ▲ Bs. 11.58 billion (2013)
- Number of employees: 1,666 (2013)
- Parent: Banco de Crédito del Perú
- Website: www.bcp.com.bo

Banco de Crédito de Bolivia (abbreviated as BCP) is a banking and financial services company located in Bolivia. It is headquartered in La Paz and is a wholly owned international subsidiary of Banco de Crédito del Perú, Peru's largest bank. BCP Bolivia started its operations in the country following BCP's acquisition of the Bolivian bank Banco Popular. BCP Bolivia provides its products and services through operating 102 branches, 240 ATMs, call centers, and online and mobile banking platforms. Banco de Crédito de Bolivia is currently Bolivia's fourth largest bank by total assets.

== History ==
=== Acquisition of Banco Popular ===
In 1994, Banco de Crédito del Perú acquired the Bolivian bank "Banco Popular" and renamed it to Banco de Crédito de Bolivia S.A.. The acquisition of Banco Popular allowed Banco de Crédito del Perú to begin businesses and operations in Bolivia. BCP Bolivia became a wholly owned subsidiary of Bance de Crédito del Perú.

=== Acquisition of Banco de La Paz ===
In 1998, Banco de Crédito del Perú announced its intentions to acquire the Bolivian bank "Banco de La Paz", through its subsidiary BCP Bolivia. The acquisition of the bank further expanded the bank's presence in Bolivia and added a significant number of branches in other regions of the country.

In 1999, BCP Bolivia announced the acquisition of the bankrupt "Banco Boliviano Americano". BCP Bolivia acquired the bank's operations and its headquarter buildings.

== Operations ==
=== Personal banking ===
BCP Bolivia's personal banking division serves customer individuals, business individuals and small businesses. This financial product was composed of the following areas:

- Retail banking: Offers Transactional accounts, savings accounts, debit cards, credit cards, mortgages and personal loans.
- Business banking: Offers business bank accounts, savings, mortgages and loans.

=== Credibolsa ===
Credibolsa is a subsidiary of BCP Bolivia that provides financial advisory services and brokerage in the Bolivian stock market for the buying and selling of long-term debt or equity-backed securities. It also provides financial consulting and offers investment management among other services.

== Corporate affairs ==
=== Board of directors ===
- (Peru) Dionisio Romero Paoletti (Chairman)
- (Peru) Walter Bayly Llona (Vice president)
- (Peru) Jorge Mujica Gianoli (General manager)

=== Shareholders ===
Institutions	Capital (Bs.)	Shares held	% held
Banco de Crédito del Perú	282,320,000	14,116	95.84
Credicorp	12,000,000	600	4.07
Inmobiliaria BCP S.A.	80,000	4	0.03
Solución Empresa Administradora Hipotecaria S.A.	80,000	4	0.03
Empresa Financiera Edyficar S.A.	80,000	4	0.03

== Avion Pirata ==
One of the bank's branches was once located inside a famous airplane, the local legend Avion Pirata.
