= Douglas XB-31 =

American bomber project

XB-31

General information
- Type: Heavy bomber
- Manufacturer: Douglas Aircraft
- Status: Design only
- Primary user: United States Army Air Forces
- Number built: 0

The Douglas XB-31 (Douglas Model 332) was the design submitted by Douglas after the request by the United States Army Air Forces for a very heavy bomber aircraft, the same request that led to the Boeing B-29 Superfortress, Lockheed XB-30, and Consolidated B-32 Dominator.

== Design and development ==
Around 1938, United States Army General Henry H. "Hap" Arnold, the head of the US Army Air Corps (USAAC), was growing alarmed at the possibility of war in Europe and in the Pacific. Hoping to be prepared for the long-term requirements of the Air Force, Arnold created a special committee chaired by Brigadier General W. G. Kilner; one of its members was Charles Lindbergh. The Douglas firm at the time was working on an even larger, 212 foot (64.6 meter) wingspan four-engined strategic bomber prototype airframe, the Douglas XB-19, that made her maiden flight in late June 1941.

After a tour of Luftwaffe bases, Lindbergh became convinced that Nazi Germany was far ahead of other European nations. In a report in 1939, the committee made a number of recommendations, including development of new long-range heavy bombers. When war broke out in Europe, Arnold requested design studies from several companies on a Very Long-Range bomber capable of travelling 5,000 miles (8,000 km). Approval was granted on 2 December 1939.

Throughout 1939 and 1940 Douglas investigated designs of the Model 332 with different powerplants (Wright R-2600, Pratt and Whitney R-2800, Wright R-2160, Wright R-3350). All were designed to have roughly same operating range, with variations in the projected service ceiling.

The XB-31 design was rejected in favor of the B-29 and B-32 (along with the XB-30) because the USAAC found the B-29 superior to the Douglas and Lockheed designs.

== Specifications (Model 332F as designed) ==
Data from

General characteristics

- Crew: 8
- Length: 88 ft 8.5 in (27.038 m)
- Wingspan: 140 ft 6 in (42.82 m)
- Height: 28 ft 3 in (8.61 m)
- Wing area: 1,780 sq ft (165 m^{2})
- Gross weight: 106,994 lb (48,532 kg)
- Max takeoff weight: 120,000 lb (54,431 kg)
- Powerplant: 4 × Wright R-3350-13 Duplex-Cyclone 18-cylinder air-cooled radial piston engines, 2,200 hp (1,600 kW) each

Performance

- Maximum speed: 377 mph (607 km/h, 328 kn)
- Range: 5,370 mi (8,640 km, 4,670 nmi)
- Service ceiling: 31,600 ft (9,600 m)
- Wing loading: 41 lb/sq ft (200 kg/m^{2})
- Power/mass: 0.066 hp/lb (0.109 kW/kg), later 0.089 hp/lb (0.146 kW/kg)

Armament

- Guns:
  - 6× .50 in (12.7 mm) machine guns in remote ventral and dorsal turrets
  - 1x machine gun in tail
  - 1× 0.79 in (20 mm) cannon in tail
- Bombs:
  - 4x 2,000 lb (907 kg) bombs
  - 8x 1,000 lb (454 kg) bombs
  - 16x 500 lb (227 kg) bombs

== See also ==
Aircraft of comparable role, configuration, and era

- Boeing B-29 Superfortress
- Consolidated B-32 Dominator
- Lockheed XB-30
- Messerschmitt Me 264

Related lists

- List of bomber aircraft
- List of military aircraft of the United States
