= Lockheed L-049 Constellation =

US airliner with 4 piston engines, 1943

L-049 Constellation
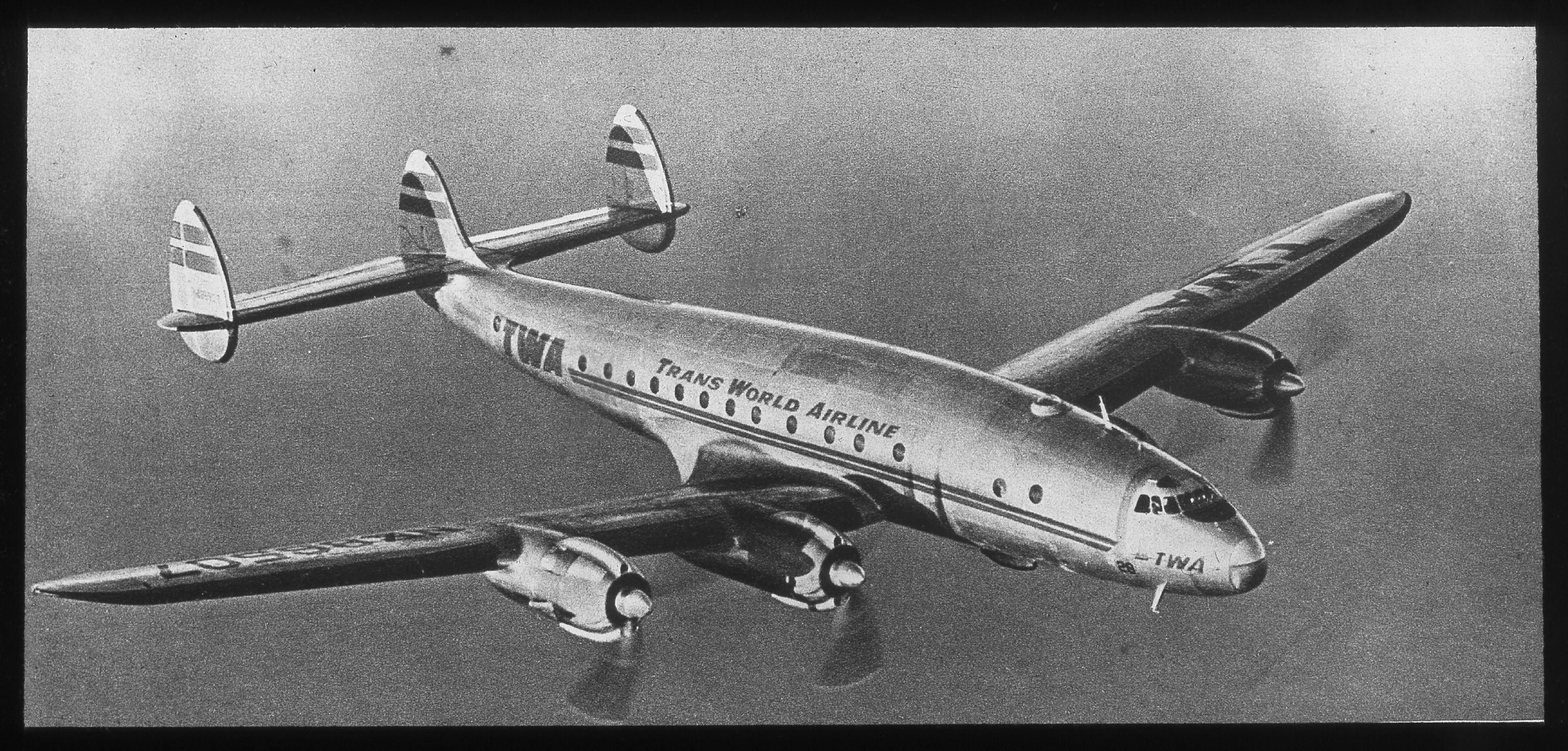
- A Trans World Airlines L-049 Constellation in flight

General information
- Type: Transport/Airliner
- National origin: United States
- Manufacturer: Lockheed
- Designer: Clarence "Kelly" Johnson
- Status: Retired
- Primary users: Trans World Airlines Pan American World Airways; American Overseas Airlines; BOAC
- Number built: 88 (14 Military, 74 Civilian)

History
- Manufactured: 1942–1946
- Introduction date: February 5, 1946
- First flight: January 9, 1943 (War production C-69); July 12, 1945 (Postwar production L-049)
- Retired: Late 1970s
- Developed from: L-044 Excalibur
- Variant: C-69 Constellation
- Developed into: Lockheed XB-30 (Unbuilt); L-649 Constellation; L-749 Constellation; L-1049 Super Constellation

The Lockheed L-049 Constellation is the first model of the Lockheed Constellation aircraft line. It entered service as the C-69 military transport aircraft during World War II for the United States Army Air Forces and was the first civilian version after the war. When production ended in 1946 it was replaced by the improved L-649 and L-749 Constellation.

== History ==
=== Design and development ===
In June 1939, Howard Hughes, the owner of Transcontinental & Western Air (later Trans World Airlines and abbreviated TWA), held a meeting at his Hancock Park residence in California. Jack Frye (then president of TWA) attended along with three executives from the Lockheed Aircraft Corporation which included designer Clarence "Kelly" Johnson. During the meeting Hughes expressed his concerns for what he called the "airliner of the future". Lockheed's airliner under development at the time, the L-044 Excalibur, did not meet the requirements.

When the meeting ended with Hughes and Frye, the executives immediately started on improving the Excalibur to meet Hughes' expectations. One idea was to use the Wright R-2600 engines in place of the proposed Wright GR-1820. It was decided instead to start from scratch using some original characteristics of the Excalibur. The design was lengthened from 74 ft 3 in (22.63 m) to 95 ft 9 in (29.18 m) and the wingspan was increased to 102 ft 4 in (31.19 m). Six different layouts of the cockpit envisaged, including a "Bug-Eye" proposal in which the pilot and co-pilot would sit in separate domes next to each other. In the end, it was decided to use a single curvature design with all-around glazing. Three weeks later, the new design was presented.

The design was given the designation L-049 or Excalibur A. The wings of the aircraft were similar to those used by the P-38 Lightning fighter. The aircraft was to be powered by four Wright R-3350 Duplex-Cyclone radials with the Pratt & Whitney R-2800 as the back-up. Re-designed, the Excalibur was to be priced at $450,000, making it the most expensive airliner on the drawing board. Since TWA was unable to provide funding, Howard Hughes had his other company, the Hughes Tool Company, fund the construction of the airliner. Hughes ordered 40 Excaliburs on July 10, 1940, making the order the largest in airline history at the time. The development was to be kept a secret until the 35th aircraft was delivered to TWA. This was done in order to keep competitors such as Juan Trippe's Pan American World Airways from ordering the aircraft and competing with TWA. The secret was apparently well kept.

When Hughes was brought in to look at a scale mock up of the Excalibur's cabin, he was not pleased with the outcome and stated "It's not what I expected". Hughes later had Raymond Loewy redesign the cabin to his liking. A complete life sized mock up of the Excalibur was eventually constructed with battery operated retractable landing gear. The gear mechanisms were tested on the mock up for design validation before production began. The powerplant itself was tested on a PV-1 Ventura which was nicknamed "Vent-ellation" for the occasion. The name "Excalibur" was later dropped as the new aircraft had nothing in common with the original L-044 design. The name "Constellation" was picked up as an unofficial nickname until the intervention of the military.

The Constellation had several technological advancements such as electric de-icing, hydraulic assisted controls, reversible pitch propellers and pressurization, which allowed the Constellation to fly above the clouds. Lockheed had done pressurization in an aircraft before, with the Lockheed XC-35.

=== World War II and further development ===
A few months before the United States entered World War II, the Wartime Production Board inspected Lockheed's Burbank facility which housed the Constellation prototype. The secret could no longer be kept, and Lockheed announced the existence of the Constellation to the world. Even so, the secret of the Constellation's development remains one of the best kept industrial secrets to this day. Juan Trippe took advantage of this situation and ordered 22 L-049 Constellations and 18 L-149 Constellations (a model with a larger fuel capacity). KLM jumped in and ordered four examples. However, production couldn't begin right away, as production of warplanes destined for Great Britain required Lockheed’s production facilities. After cancellation of the XB-30 (a bomber version of the Constellation) in 1941, military officials gave Lockheed the go-ahead to build 80 Constellations, on the condition that other aircraft on their assembly lines would not be affected. With this, Lockheed could now put more attention towards building the Constellation airliner.

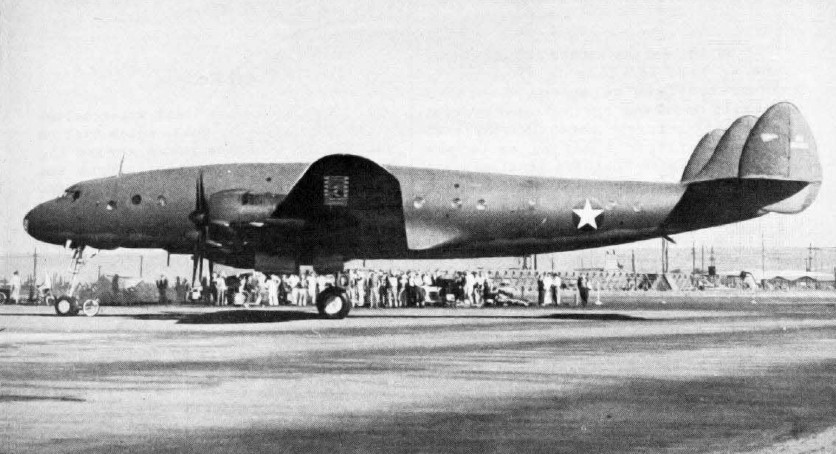
Prototype XC-69, circa 1943

On December 7, 1941, Japanese forces launched a surprise attack on the US Naval base in Pearl Harbor, Hawaii, causing the United States to enter the war. This meant that Lockheed's production lines were now under military control for the war effort. In March 1942, the 80 L-049 Constellations planned for airline use were requisitioned by the Air Transport Command, and given the military designation C-69. In December 1942, the XC-69 prototype was rolled out. This was the first four engined aircraft to be produced by Lockheed. Several ground tests were performed on the XC-69 that same month. The final inspections were taken out on the XC-69 in January 1943, and the aircraft first flew on January 9 with Edmund Allen (Boeing's chief test pilot who was borrowed for the occasion) at the controls. When the flight ended, Allen stated "This machine works so well that you don't need me anymore!". With that, Allen returned to Boeing. On April 17, 1944, the second production C-69 was flown by Howard Hughes and Jack Frye, President TWA on a flight between Burbank and Washington DC that took little less than seven hours. The aircraft was painted in full TWA livery for the occasion, and actress Ava Gardner was on board.

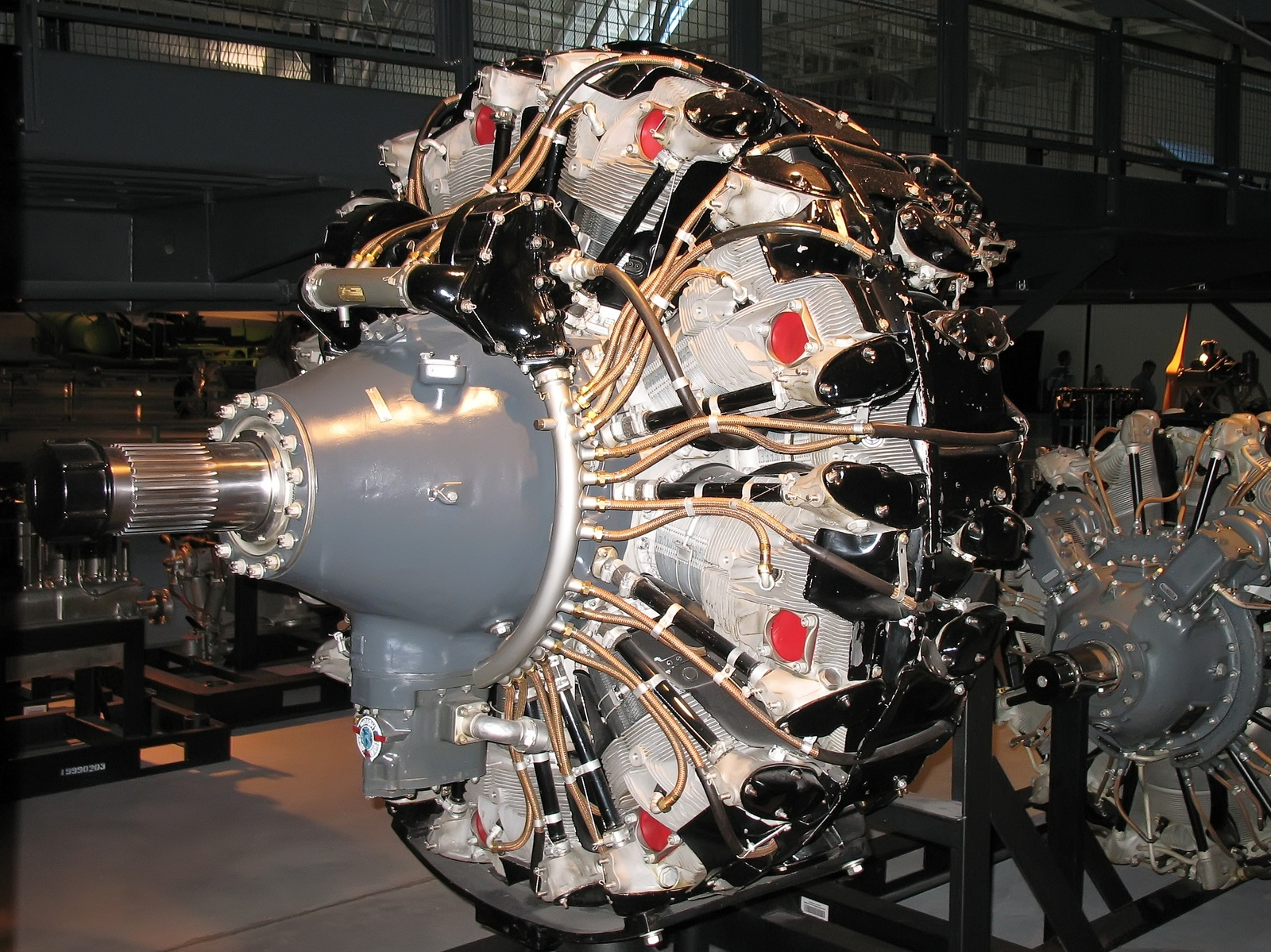
The Wright R-3350 Duplex-Cyclone was the troubled powerplant of the Constellation and caused delays in the development of the aircraft.

Due to problems with the Constellation's powerplant, the R-3350, the aircraft were grounded in February 1943. Flight testing resumed in June 1943. Problems with the R-3350 however, continued and production of the R-3350 was halted until the problems with the engines could be solved. This slowed down the development of the Constellation. Further setbacks occurred, including the B-29 Superfortress (for which the R-3350 had been originally developed) taking priority in engine supply. The Douglas C-54 Skymaster was also further developed than the Constellation. With the end of the war now in sight, the original order of 260 C-69s was first reduced to 73 then cancelled. Only 22 C-69s were ever constructed for the United States Army Air Forces and only 15 were delivered.

=== Postwar service ===
As World War II drew to a close, large quantities of military surplus became available on the civilian market along with the cancellation of the remaining C-69 Constellations still in production. With the Constellation's design at risk, Lockheed purchased the five remaining C-69 transports still in production back from the military, saving 15,000 jobs. The five aircraft were re-converted into L-049 civilian airliners and put up for sale on the market. These modifications included removal of the retractable tail stand; along with the inclusion of a luxury interior, more portholes, a galley, and crew relief areas. Better ventilation, insulation and heating were also added. The powerplants were replaced by R-3350-745C18BA-1 engines (the civilian equivalent to the wartime R-3350-35). Design tests did not need to be conducted, as Lockheed had already tasked them to the C-69 aircraft during the war (one of the C-69s also completed the trials for the civilian airworthiness certificate on December 11, 1945). This made the development of L-049 months ahead of the competing Boeing 377 Stratocruiser, Douglas DC-6 and Republic RC-2 Rainbow (which was still on the drawing board). 89 aircraft had been ordered by November 1945. The L-049 was used by TWA, Delta Air Lines, Capital Airlines, Braniff, Pan American World Airways, American Overseas Airlines (AOA), Pan American-Grace Airways (Panagra), Air France, KLM, BOAC, El Al, Cubana de Aviación, and other less-known airlines.

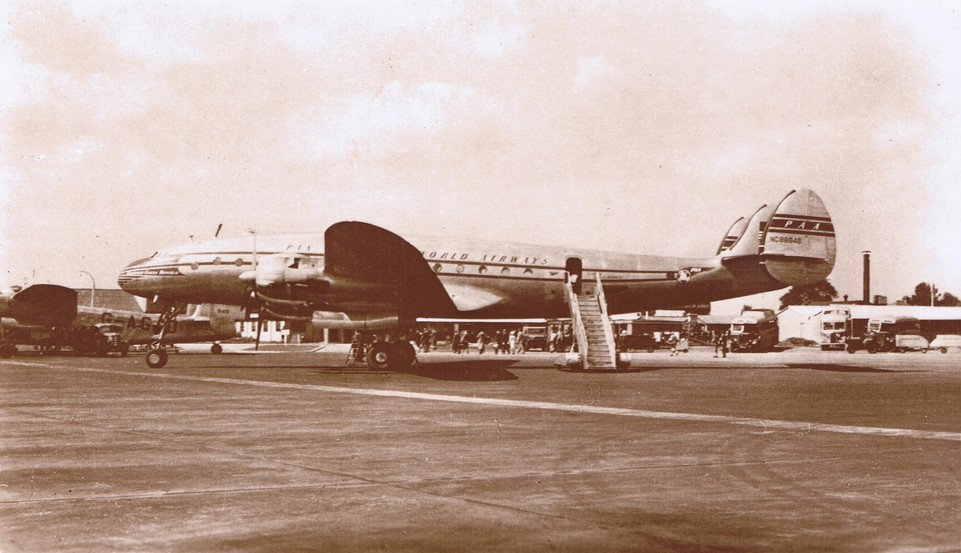
A Pan American World Airways L-049 Constellation at London Heathrow International Airport.

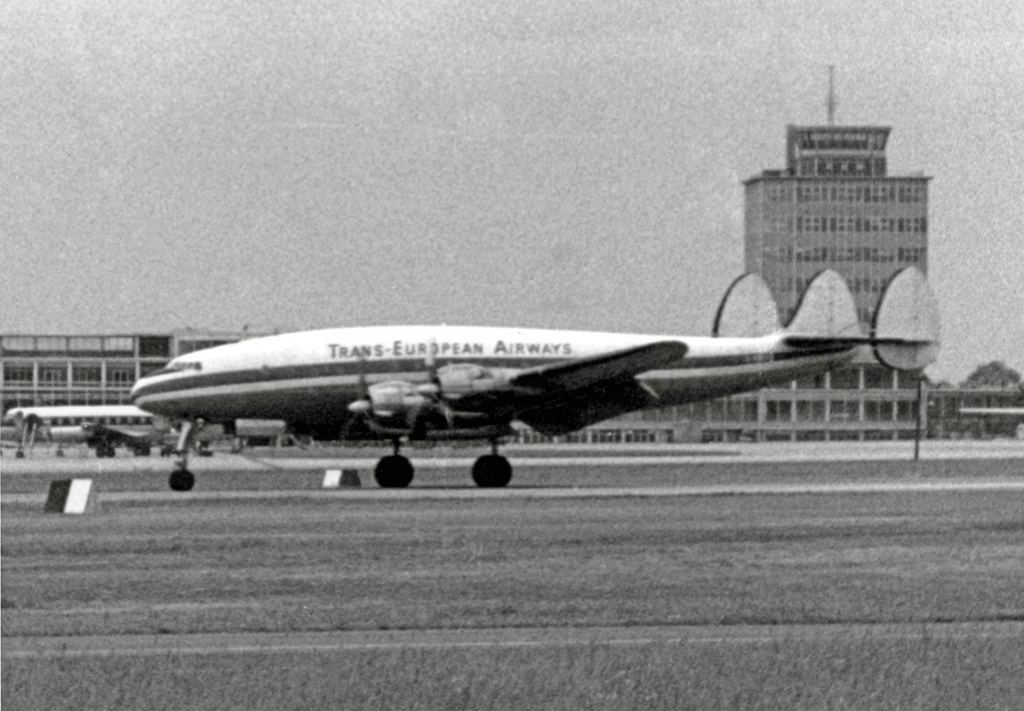
An L-049 of Trans European Airways.

The first production L-049 flew on July 12, 1945, and was delivered to TWA on November 14, 1945. Pan Am received its first L-049 on January 5, 1946. Due to clauses imposed on Lockheed by Howard Hughes, American Airlines and United Airlines went instead to Douglas and ordered the competing DC-6 (AOA, the overseas subsidiary of American Airlines, still purchased the L-049). The first commercial flight of the L-049 occurred on February 5, 1946, with TWA's "Star of Paris" flying from New York City to Paris. The flight lasted nearly 17 hours, stopping over in both Ireland and Newfoundland. On January 14, 1946, Pan Am began flying its L-049 equipment between Bermuda and New York, replacing the slower Boeing 314 Clipper that flew before it. AOA, BOAC, and Air France all started L-049 operations later that year. Due to requests by the airlines, production ceased in 1946, in favor of a more standard civilian Constellation, which became the L-649 and L-749 respectively.

On the evening of June 18, 1947, the Lockheed L-049 Constellation serving Pan Am Flight 121, known as the Clipper Eclipse and crewed by third officer Gene Roddenberry (who went on to create the original Star Trek television series), suffered an engine failure which led to the overheating of the remaining engines until one caught fire, which spread to the aircraft. When an engine fell from the aircraft, it was unable to maintain altitude, resulting in a crash in the Syrian desert 4 miles (6.4 km) from the town of Mayadin in the early morning of June 19, 1947 and the death of fifteen people.

== Variants ==
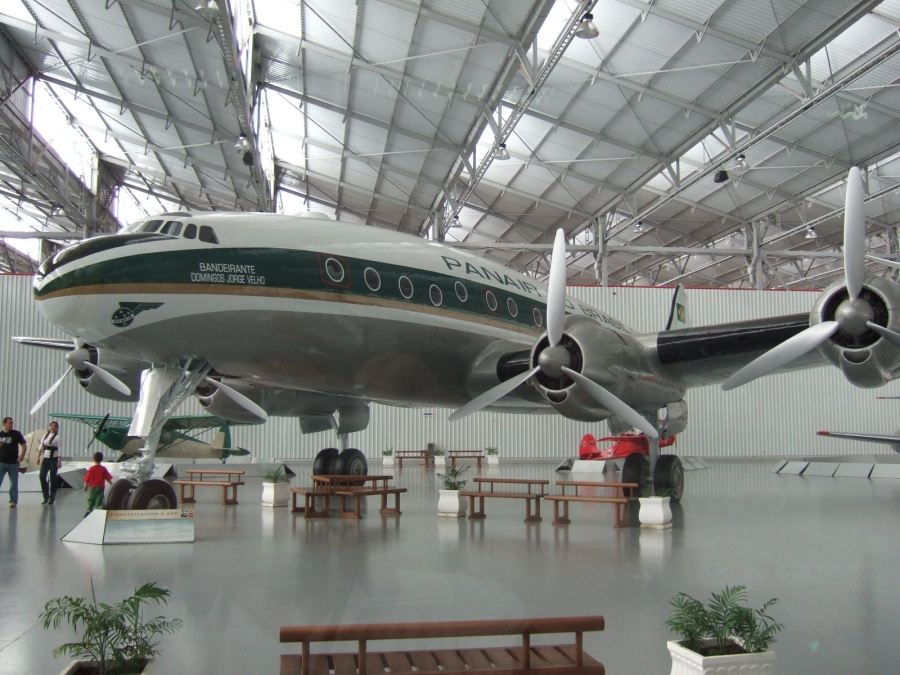
An L-049 preserved in Panair do Brasil colors at the Wings of a Dream Museum in Brazil.

L-049
Initial production variant powered by two R-3350-745C18BA-1 radials. Originally produced as the C-69 before 1945. 87 built.

L-149
Designation given to L-049 aircraft refitted with a larger fuel capacity.

L-549
Company designation for the sole C-69C built for the United States Army Air Forces.

== Specifications (L-049) ==
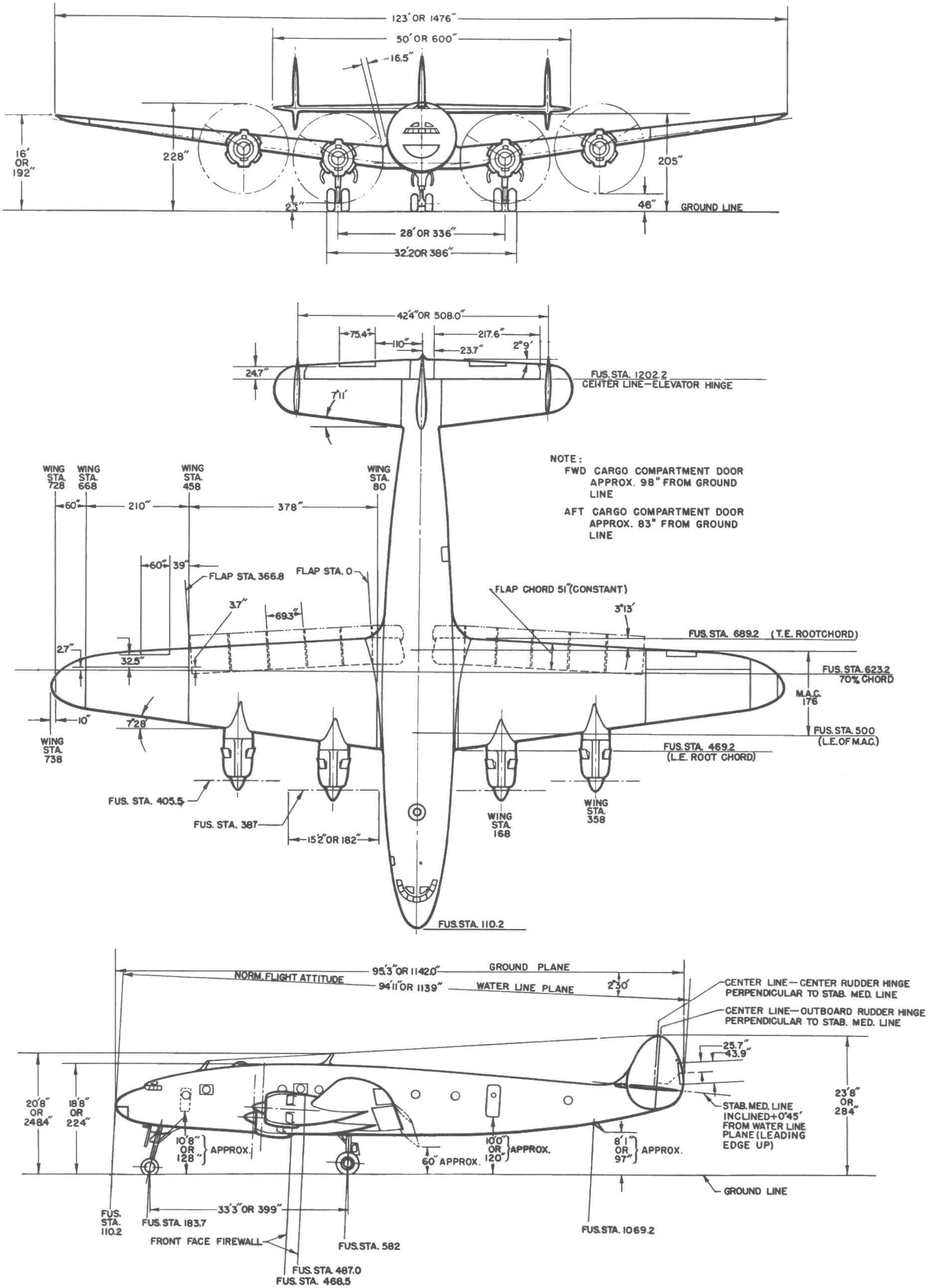
3-view line drawing of the Lockheed Model 049 Constellation

Data from American Museum of Aviation

General characteristics

- Crew: 4 Pilots and 2 to 4 Flight Attendants
- Capacity: 40–81 Passengers
- Length: 95 ft 3 in (29.03 m)
- Wingspan: 123 ft (37 m)
- Height: 23 ft 8 in (7.21 m)
- Wing area: 1,650 sq ft (153 m^{2})
- Airfoil: root: NACA 23018; tip: NACA 4412
- Empty weight: 49,392 lb (22,404 kg)
- Max takeoff weight: 86,250 lb (39,122 kg)
- Powerplant: 4 × Wright R-3350-745C18BA-1 18-cylinder air-cooled radial piston engine, 2,200 hp (1,600 kW) each
- Propellers: 3-bladed constant-speed fully-feathering propellers

Performance

- Cruise speed: 313 mph (504 km/h, 272 kn)
- Range: 3,995 mi (6,429 km, 3,472 nmi) with maximum fuel load

2,290 mi (1,990 nmi; 3,685 km) with maximum payload

- Service ceiling: 25,300 ft (7,700 m)

== See also ==
Related development

- Lockheed Constellation
- Lockheed C-69 Constellation
- Lockheed L-649 Constellation
- Lockheed L-1049 Super Constellation
- Lockheed C-121/R7V Constellation
- Lockheed EC-121 Warning Star
- Lockheed L-1649A Starliner

Aircraft of comparable role, configuration, and era

- Boeing 377 Stratocruiser
- Bristol Britannia
- Douglas DC-4/C-54 Skymaster
- Douglas DC-6
- Douglas DC-7
- Ilyushin Il-18
- Lockheed L-188 Electra
- Republic XF-12 Rainbow
- Vickers Viscount
- Tupolev Tu-114
- Breda-Zappata BZ.308

Related lists

- List of Lockheed aircraft
- List of models of the Lockheed Constellation
- List of Lockheed Constellation operators
