= List of accidents and incidents involving the Lockheed Constellation =

The Lockheed Constellation ("Connie") was a propeller-driven airliner powered by four 18-cylinder radial Wright R-3350 engines. It was built by Lockheed between 1943 and 1958 at its Burbank, California, US, facility. A total of 856 aircraft were produced in four models, all distinguished by a triple-tail design and dolphin-shaped fuselage. The Constellation was used as a civilian airliner and as a U.S. military air transport, seeing service in the Berlin Airlift. It was the presidential aircraft for U.S. President Dwight D. Eisenhower.

== Accidents and incidents ==
Like every other major type in long service and operation, accidents and incidents have been recorded that have substantially reduced the numbers flying. The following list is typical of such a record of operational use. The fatalities listed below only include those who were on board Lockheed Constellations.

=== 1943–1949 ===
| Date | Type | Call sign | Flight | Fatalities | Info |
|---|---|---|---|---|---|
| September 18, 1945 | C-69 | 42-94551 | —N/a | None | Aircraft was damaged beyond repair after a wheels up landing following engine problems at Topeka, Kansas, United States. |
| 1946 | C-69 | 43-10314 | —N/a | None | Aircraft was damaged beyond repair after ditching in the Mediterranean Sea; the War Assets Administration aircraft was sold to the French government for parts and given the temporary registration of F-BECA and used to repair Air France L-749 c/n 2512 after it was damaged by fire in 1949 and BOAC L-049 Constellation c/n 1980 after a 1951 accident. |
| March 29, 1946 | L-049 | NC86510 | TWA Flight 955 | None | Ran off the runway on landing at National Airport, Washington, DC due to crew error; all 12 on board survived, but the aircraft was written off. |
| June 18, 1946 | L-049 | NC88858 | Pan Am Flight 100 | None | Belly landed at Willimantic, Connecticut after a failure and fire in the number four engine; all 52 on board survived. The aircraft was repaired and returned to service, but was lost in the crash of Pan Am Flight 1-10 in 1948. |
| July 11, 1946 | L-049 | NC86513 | TWA Flight 513 | 5 | Crashed near Reading, Pennsylvania after an in-flight fire, killing five of the six crew on board. |
| September 24, 1946 | L-049 | NC88831 | —N/a | None | Crashed on landing at Shannon Airport after the landing gear was raised in mistake for the flaps; all 36 on board survived, but the aircraft was written off. |
| October 12, 1946 | L-049 | NC86512 | —N/a | None | Ran off the runway on landing at New Castle County Airport due to pilot error. The airplane was being ferried from New York to Wilmington with eight crew on board of whom all survived. The aircraft was written off. |
| December 28, 1946 | L-049 | NC86505 | TWA Flight 6963 | 9 | Crashed while attempting to land at Shannon Airport, Ireland due to altimeter failure. Nine of the 23 people on board were killed. |
| March 10, 1947 | Unknown | —N/a | —N/a | 1 | TWA Constellation "Star of Hollywood" experienced sudden decompression during a transatlantic flight from New York City to Geneva, Switzerland. The aircraft had stopped at Gander to refuel and take on passengers and crew; it was 500 miles into the leg to Shannon, Ireland, at an altitude of 19,000 ft. when the astrodome (a clear plastic bubble on the top of the fuselage) shattered. Navigator George Hart, who was under the astrodome making a sextant measurement at the time, was sucked out of the aircraft over the North Atlantic. The aircraft returned to Gander and passengers continued the flight on a replacement aircraft. Within a few weeks, TWA responded to the accident by equipping navigators on transatlantic flights with a safety harness; on aircraft used for domestic flights, a 1/4-inch aluminum plate was installed under the astrodome (only transatlantic flights used the astrodome for navigation). |
| May 11, 1947 | L-049 | NC86508 | —N/a | 4 | Crashed near the Brandywine Shoal lighthouse, Cape May, New Jersey, at 8:45 a.m. EST while conducting practice emergency landing procedures, killing Capt. Patrick McKeirnan and the three remaining crew on board. The cause was traced to an unexplained loss of control. |
| June 19, 1947 | L-049 | NC88845 | Pan Am Flight 121 | 15 | Crashed near Mayadin, Syria on a flight originating in New York and making its inaugural westbound flight of round-the-world service. The aircraft's No. 1 engine failed halfway on a leg from Karachi to Istanbul. Due to closed airports and inadequate repair facilities, the pilot chose to continue to its destination. Several hours later, the remaining engines overheated and the No. 2 engine caught fire and ultimately separated from the aircraft, necessitating a crash landing near Habbaniya RAF Station on Iraq/Syria border at about 01:40L. Probable cause of the accident was a fire which resulted from an attempt to feather the No. 2 (port inboard) propeller after the failure of the No. 2 engine thrust bearing. Gene Roddenberry (creator of Star Trek) was a deadheading Pan Am pilot aboard who helped rescue many of the passengers. Fifteen of the 36 people on board were killed. |
| November 18, 1947 | L-049 | NC86507 | —N/a | 5 | Crashed short of the runway at New Castle County (Delaware USA) Airport during a training flight due to pilot error, killing the five crew. |
| January 21, 1948 | L-649 | NC111A | EAL Flight 604 | None | Crashed on landing at Logan International Airport due to snow on the runway; all 25 on board survived, but the aircraft was written off. |
| February 7, 1948 | L-649 | NC112A | EAL Flight 611 | 1 | Suffered a failure of the number three propeller and blade separation in the Atlantic 156 mi off Brunswick, Georgia three hours after takeoff. A portion of the blade penetrated the fuselage, severing engine controls, electrical wires and control cables as well as killing a crew member when the blade cut through the floor. The front portion of the number three engine later fell off. Despite a loss of control of one engine and a complete loss of another, the aircraft was able to land safely at West Palm Beach Airport. Although the aircraft was substantially damaged, it was repaired, rebuilt to L-749A standard and returned to service, but was written off after a 1955 crash. The cause of the incident was the failure of the number three propeller caused by high stress brought on by repetitive engine malfunctioning. |
| April 15, 1948 | L-049 | NC88858 | Pan Am Flight 1-10 | 30 | Crashed attempting to land at Shannon Airport, Ireland. Thirty of the 31 people on board were killed. |
| October 20, 1948 | L-049 | PH-TEN | —N/a | 40 | Crashed near Prestwick Airport, Scotland, killing all 40 passengers and crew on board. The aircraft was circling below low cloud for a visual approach to Prestwick and hit high tension powerlines that were not on the Dutch visual approach map the crew had been issued. |
| November 25, 1948 | L-049 | NC90824 | TWA Flight 211 | None | Crashed on landing at Los Angeles Municipal Airport due to poor visibility; all 23 on board survived, but the aircraft was written off. |
| January 30, 1949 | L-749 | NC86530 | Pan Am Flight 100 | None (Note: This figure just includes those on Flight 100) | Collided with a private Cessna 140 over Port Washington, New York; the Cessna crashed, killing both pilots on board; the Constellation landed safely with no casualties. |
| June 23, 1949 | L-749 | PH-TER | —N/a | 33 | Crashed off Bari, Italy due to a loss of control and in-flight breakup, killing all 33 passengers and crew on board. |
| July 12, 1949 | L-749 | PH-TDF | —N/a | 45 | Crashed near Bombay, India due to pilot errors, killing all 45 passengers and crew on board. |
| October 28, 1949 | L-749 | F-BAZN | Air France Flight 009 | 48 | Crashed into Pico da Vara (São Miguel Island, Azores), all 11 crew members and 37 passengers on board died, including French boxer Marcel Cerdan and the famous French violinist Ginette Neveu, while approaching the intermediate stop airport at Santa Maria. |
| December 18, 1949 | L-049 | NC86501 | TWA Flight 154 | None | Ran off the runway while landing at Midway Airport due to pilot error; all 31 on board survived. The aircraft was extensively damaged in the crash, but was repaired and returned to service. |

=== 1950–1959 ===
| Date | Type | Call sign | Flight | Fatalities | Info |
|---|---|---|---|---|---|
| July 28, 1950 | L-049 | PP-PCG | PDB Flight 099 | 51 | Crashed on the Chapéu Hill (29°50′12.25″S 51°6′18.03″W) near Porto Alegre-Canoas (Gravataí) Air Force Base after an aborted landing, killing 44 passengers and 7 crew. |
| August 31, 1950 | L-749 | N6004C | TWA Flight 903 | 55 | Crashed near Wadi Natrun, Egypt while attempting an emergency landing after an engine fire, killing all 55 people on board in the worst-ever accident involving the L-749. |
| November 3, 1950 | L-749 | VT-CQP | Air India Flight 245 | 48 | Crashed into Mont Blanc while flying on the Bombay-Cairo-Geneva-London route, all 40 passengers and eight crew on board were killed. |
| November 18, 1950 | L-049 | NC86511 | —N/a | None | Overran the runway on landing at Long Beach Airport following double engine failure; all 60 on board survived. The aircraft was repaired and returned to service, but was lost in the crash of TWA Flight 529 in 1961. |
| March 19, 1951 | L-049 | N91202 | TWA Flight 59 | None | Landed wheels-up at Sky Harbor International Airport due to pilot error; all 34 passengers survived. The aircraft was repaired and returned to service. |
| June 22, 1951 | L-049 | N88846 | Pan Am Flight 151 | 40 | Crashed into terrain near Sanoyea, Liberia due to pilot error, killing all 40 on board. |
| July 19, 1951 | L-749 | N119A | EAL Flight 601 | None | Suffered severe buffeting after an access door opened in flight. A flapless wheels-up landing was made at Curles Neck Farm, Virginia. The aircraft was later repaired and returned to service, but was written off after a 1953 crash. |
| March 23, 1952 | L-749 | PH-TFF | —N/a | None | Crashed on landing at Bangkok, Thailand, all 44 passengers and crew on board survived. Shortly before landing, a blade on the No. 3 propeller broke off, causing failure of the engine and resultant fire. The fire also caused the right main landing gear to collapse when the aircraft landed. |
| January 22, 1953 | L-049 | N38936 | —N/a | None | Burned out following a belly landing at Lockheed Air Terminal during a test flight. |
| June 17, 1953 | L-049 | PP-PDA | —N/a | 17 | Crashed while on approach to Congonhas Airport at night in poor visibility due to crew error, killing all 17 on board. |
| July 7, 1953 | R7V-1 | 128440 | —N/a | 6 | Crashed near Chestertown, Maryland after the tail separated in flight, killing all six on board. |
| August 3, 1953 | L-749 | —N/a | Air France Flight 152 | 4 | Ditched 6 miles from Fetiye Point, Turkey, 1.5 miles offshore into the Mediterranean Sea during the Rome–Beirut leg of a Paris–Rome–Beirut–Tehran passenger service. Violent vibrations following an unexplained fracture of a propeller blade caused engine number three to break away, and control of engine number four was also lost. Vibrations continued with loss of altitude. The crew of eight and all but four of the 34 passengers were rescued. The wreckage was discovered by the Turkish Navy in 2018 in 842 feet of water. |
| September 1, 1953 | L-749 | F-BAZZ | Air France Flight 178 | 42 | Crashed into Mont Le Cimet due to an unexplained course change, killing all 42 passengers and crew on board, including French violinist Jacques Thibaud. |
| September 6, 1953 | L-1049 | N6214C | NWA Flight 8 | None | Swerved off the runway on landing at McChord AFB after the landing gear did not fully extend due to hydraulic failure; all 32 on board survived. |
| October 19, 1953 | L-749 | N119A | —N/a | 2 | Crashed on takeoff from Idlewild International Airport. Two passengers were killed. |
| February 5, 1954 | RC-121C | 51-3838 | NWA Flight 8 | None | Ditched in San Pablo Bay, California in thick fog; all 13 crew survived. |
| March 13, 1954 | L-749 | G-ALAM | —N/a | 33 | Crashed short of the runway at Kallang Airport as a result of pilot fatigue, killing 33 of 40 on board. |
| August 3, 1954 | L-1049C | F-BGNA | Air France Flight 175 | None | Belly-landed in a field near Preston, Connecticut due to fuel exhaustion after diverting to Boston due to bad weather; all 37 passengers and crew on board survived, but the aircraft was written off. |
| August 9, 1954 | L-749 | HK-163 | —N/a | 30 | Crashed just after takeoff from Lajes Airport due to pilot error, killing all 30 on board. |
| August 25, 1954 | L-749 | F-BAZI | —N/a | None | Overran the runway on landing at Gander Airport; all 67 on board survived, but the aircraft was written off. |
| September 5, 1954 | L-1049C | PH-LKY | KLM Flight 633 | 28 | Crashed on takeoff from Shannon, Ireland, killing 28 of the passengers. |
| October 30, 1954 | C-121 | 128441 | USN Flight 57 | 42 | Disappeared 350 miles off Maryland with 42 passengers and crew. Search for plane had to be suspended because of extreme weather. |
| December 9, 1954 | WV-2 | 131387 | —N/a | None | Crashed, skidded and burned following a hard landing. |
| December 17, 1954 | L-1049E | CF-TGG | —N/a | None | Crashed in a field at Brampton, Ontario, Canada while on approach to Malton Airport due to pilot negligence; all 23 on board survived, including the pilot, who later died in a 1957 crash. |
| January 17, 1955 | C-121J | 131639 | —N/a | 13 | Crashed in the Atlantic off Stephenville, Canada due to double engine failure, killing all 13 on board. |
| April 11, 1955 | L-749 | VT-DEP | —N/a | 16 | Bombed in mid-air and crashed off the Great Natuna Islands; 16 of the 19 on board died. |
| June 16, 1955 | L-149 | PP-PDJ | PDB Flight 263 | 16 | Hit a 12m tree while on final approach to land at Asunción. Part of the wing broke off, the aircraft crashed and caught fire. 16 out of 24 passengers and crew aboard died. |
| July 27, 1955 | L-149 | 4X-AKC | El Al Flight 402 | 58 | Shot down over Bulgarian airspace, killing all aboard, seven crew and 51 passengers in the worst-ever accident involving the L-149. |
| December 17, 1955 | L-749 | F-BAZG | —N/a | Unknown | Crashed and burned on takeoff from Maison Blanche Airport. |
| December 21, 1955 | L-749 | N112A | EAL Flight 642 | 17 | Crashed while on approach to Thomas Cole Imeson Municipal Airport in Jacksonville, killing all 17 on board. |
| June 20, 1956 | L-1049 | YV-C-AMS | LAV Flight 253 | 74 | Crashed 41 mi off New York after breaking up due to a possible in-flight explosion, killing all 74 on board. |
| June 30, 1956 | L-1049 | N6902C | TWA Flight 2 | 70 (Note: This figure just includes those lost on Flight 2) | Struck by United Airlines Flight 718 (a Douglas DC-7) over the Grand Canyon. It broke apart and crashed; 70 people on board died. Flight 718 crashed nearby, resulting in the deaths of 58 on board. |
| September 17, 1956 | WV-3 | 137893 | —N/a | None | Ditched 100 mi south of Guam after all four engines failed while returning from a weather reconnaissance flight; all 18 crew survived and were rescued a few hours later. |
| November 27, 1956 | L-749 | YV-C-AMA | LAV Flight 253 (Note: Second of two flights that shared the same number) | 25 | Crashed on Mt Naiguata in Venezuela. All 25 passengers and crew on board were killed. |
| December 30, 1956 | C-121C | 54-0165 | —N/a | 12 | Crashed while on approach to Dhahran International Airport in poor visibility, killing 12 of 38 on board. GCA was reportedly not working at the time of the crash. |
| April 17, 1957 | WV-2 | 141314 | —N/a | None | Crashed and burned at NAS Argentia during a belly landing following an in-flight fire and explosion in the left wheel well and resulting separation of the number two engine; all 24 crew survived. |
| June 28, 1957 | L-1049 | N6212C | —N/a | None | Burned out at Miami International Airport following a ground collision with an Eastern Airlines Douglas DC-7 (N808D). |
| July 10, 1957 | L-749 | ET-T-T35 | Ethiopian Air Lines Flight 3 | None | Forced landing in a field 31 mi from Khartoum, Sudan following an in-flight fire; all 20 passengers and crew survived. During takeoff, the main landing gear brakes overheated, caused by sticking brakes. The landing gear tire later blew, damaging fluid lines inside the number two engine nacelle. Just before landing, the number two engine fell off. |
| July 16, 1957 | L-1049E | PH-LKT | KLM Flight 844 | 58 | Crashed near Biak, New Guinea (now Indonesia), killing 58 passengers and crew on board, 10 passengers survived. |
| August 16, 1957 | L-1049G | PP-VDA | Varig Flight 850 | 1 | Ditched 500 m (1,600 ft) off Cabarete, Dominican Republic following triple engine failure, killing one of eleven crew. The aircraft was being ferried from Ciudad Trujillo to New York via Miami. |
| December 6, 1957 | L-1049G | F-BHMK | —N/a | None | Crashed on the runway at Orly Airport due to pilot error while practicing night-time landings; all six crew survived. |
| December 23, 1957 | WV-2 | 143197 | —N/a | 19 | Ditched off Kahaku Point, Hawaii after all four engines failed, killing 19 of 23 on board. |
| January 14, 1958 | R7V-1 | 128437 | —N/a | 9 | Crashed into woods at Patuxent River NAS while practicing IFR landings in fog, killing all nine on board. |
| February 20, 1958 | WV-2 | 141310 | —N/a | 22 | Disappeared on an airborne radar patrol, west of Ilha do Corvo, Azores en route from Naval Air Station Argentia, Newfoundland and Labrador to Lajes Field, Terceira Island, Azores. No trace was found of the aircraft and its 22 crew. |
| March 22, 1958 | RC-121D | 54-2308 | —N/a | None | Force-landed in a muddy field near McClellan AFB following an engine fire; all 18 crew survived. |
| May 14, 1958 | R7V-1 | 131652 | —N/a | 5 | Broke up in mid-air and crashed after performing a series of accelerated stalls, killing all five crew. The elevator boost system linkage failed, allowing the elevator to travel to the full up position. |
| May 25, 1958 | RC-121D | 55-0123 | —N/a | None | Caught fire and burned out at Otis AFB following an explosion in the center fuel tank; all 15 crew survived. The center fuel tank had been filled with fuel, although it was not supposed to be filled. During pre-flight checks, electronic equipment ignited fuel vapors from the tank. |
| June 2, 1958 | L-749 | XA-MEV | Aeronaves de Mexico Flight 111 | 45 | Crashed into La Latilla mountain shortly after takeoff from Guadalajara Airport in Guadalajara, Mexico, due to crew error, killing all 45 on board in Mexico's deadliest aviation accident at the time. Two prominent American scientists – oceanographer Townsend Cromwell and fisheries scientist Bell M. Shimada – were among the dead. |
| August 14, 1958 | L-1049H | PH-LKM | KLM Flight 607-E | 99 | Crashed on takeoff from Shannon, Ireland, killing all 99 aboard. |
| September 9, 1958 | L-1049H | N6920C | —N/a | 8 | Crashed into Mount Oyama while on a Travis AFB-Wake Island-Tokyo cargo service, killing all eight on board. |
| October 18, 1958 | WV-2 | 141294 | —N/a | 11 | Crashed in Placentia Bay while performing a GCA to Argentia NAS, killing 11 of 29 on board. |
| November 10, 1958 | L-1049D | N6503C | —N/a | None | Took off from Idlewild International Airport runway 31R when the aircraft became uncontrollable. The plane finally struck an unloaded Trans-Canada Viscount, which was preparing to board passengers. Both aircraft were destroyed by fire. One of the propellers had reversed just after takeoff. |
| December 24, 1958 | L-749 | F-BAZX | Air France Flight 703 | None | Crashed near Schwechat International Airport in poor visibility due to pilot error; all 34 passengers and crew on board survived, but the aircraft was written off. |
| January 11, 1959 | L-1049G | D-ALAK | Lufthansa Flight 502 | 36 | Crashed during approach under heavy rain at Rio de Janeiro. The crew descended below minimums, possibly due to fatigue. Of 39 passengers and crew aboard, three survived. This was the first accident of Lufthansa after it was re-established. |
| January 17, 1959 | L-1049G | N6240G | EAL Flight 704 | None | Overran the runway on landing at Miami International Airport following failure and fire in the number three engine; all 17 on board survived. The aircraft was repaired and returned to service. |
| February 28, 1959 | C-121G | 54-4069 | —N/a | 5 | Crashed near Prescott Airport while performing touch-and-go landing training, killing all five on board. |
| March 29, 1959 | WV-2 | 141332 | —N/a | None | Skidded off the runway at NAS Argentia following a hard landing after encountering windshear on approach; all 21 crew survived. |
| April 2, 1959 | WV-2 | 141303 | —N/a | 1 | Crashed at Argentia NAS after an engine failed while on an airborne radar patrol, killing one of 29 on board. |
| May 12, 1959 | L-049 | N2735A | Capital Airlines Flight 983 | 2 | Ground looped and caught fire after landing at Kanawha Airport, Charleston, West Virginia, United States, one passenger and one crew member died. |
| June 26, 1959 | L-1649 | N7313C | TWA Flight 891 | 68 | Exploded after takeoff from Malpensa Airport after being struck by lightning. All nine crew and 59 passengers aboard were killed in the crash. The crash site is situated in a small town "Olgiate Olona". Commonly it is remembered as the Disaster of Olgiate Olona. |
| July 19, 1959 | L-1049G | VT-DIN | —N/a | None | Crashed on landing at Santacruz Airport due to an improperly set altimeter; all 46 on board survived. |
| July 30, 1959 | R7V-2 | 131631 | —N/a | Unknown | Damaged beyond repair at Palmdale AFB. Later purchased by California Airmotive in May 1960 and broken up for parts. |

=== 1960–1969 ===
| Date | Type | Call sign | Flight | Fatalities | Info |
|---|---|---|---|---|---|
| January 3, 1960 | L-749 | N110A | Eastern Air Lines | None | Suffered a landing gear collapse while landing at Philadelphia International Airport and was written off; the aircraft was sold to Airmotive Suppliers Corporation and broken up in 1961. |
| January 21, 1960 | L-1049E | HK-177 | Avianca Flight 671 | 37 | Crashed and burned on landing at Montego Bay International Airport in Jamaica, resulting in the deaths of 37 of the 46 persons aboard. |
| February 29, 1960 | L-1049G | N7101C | TWA | None | Crashed on takeoff from Midway Airport, Chicago, Illinois en route to Phoenix after a main gear collapsed; all 60 passengers and crew survived, but the aircraft was written off. |
| June 14, 1960 | L-749 | N1554V | PNA Flight 201 | 14 | Crashed into Mount Gilbert. Alaska en route to Anchorage International Airport due to a navigation error, killing all 14 on board. |
| August 24, 1960 | L-1049G | VH-EAC | —N/a | None | Lost power during takeoff from Mauritius-Plaisance International Airport just before reaching the V1 speed of 115 knots. The captain pulled off the power, braked hard, and pulled selected reverse thrust. The aircraft did not decelerate as expected. The flight engineer feathered the number 3 engine and pulled its emergency shut-off valve. The Super Constellation, named "Southern Wave", could not be brought to a stop on the remaining runway and overran the runway at a speed of 40 knots. The Super Constellation bounced over a low embankment, crashed into a gully and caught fire. Of the 38 passengers and 12 crew all survived the crash. |
| August 29, 1960 | L-1049G | F-BHBC | Air France Flight 343 | 63 | Crashed off Dakar, Senegal, killing all 63 on board; the cause was never determined. |
| December 16, 1960 | L-1049 | TWA 266 | TWA Flight 266 | 44 (Note: This figure just includes those lost on flight 266) | Collided with United Airlines Flight 826 (a Douglas DC-8) over Staten Island, New York. It broke apart and crashed, with all 44 on board dying. Flight 826 remained airborne before crashing in Brooklyn, New York; all 84 people on board and six on the ground were killed. |
| January 22, 1961 | EC-121 | 143193 | —N/a | 6 | Crashed at Midway Islands NAS after striking debris on the runway; the aircraft cartwheeled and struck a truck, killing six of 22 on the aircraft and all three in the truck. |
| January 26, 1961 | L-049 | PP-PDC | —N/a | None | Crashed in a ditch after the crew ground looped the aircraft following a late landing. |
| March 22, 1961 | TC-121C | 51-3842 | —N/a | 6 | Crashed in rain near Marysville, California while on a test flight, killing all six on board. |
| May 10, 1961 | L-1649 | F-BHBM | Air France Flight 406 | 78 | Bombed in mid-air and crashed in the Algerian Sahara. All nine crew and 69 passengers were killed. |
| June 20, 1961 | L-749 | N5595A | —N/a | Unknown | Written off following a ground collision with a Douglas DC-7 (N312A) at Oakland International Airport. |
| July 30, 1961 | L-049 | N2520B | —N/a | 1 | Chased back to El Trompillo Airport in Santa Cruz, Bolivia by Fuerza Aerea Boliviana pilots. The chase caused a crash and death of a Bolivian Air Force pilot. The plane and the incident became known as Avion Pirata. (in Spanish) |
| September 1, 1961 | L-049 | N86511 | TWA Flight 529 | 78 | Crashed south of Clarendon Hills, IL due to mechanical failure, killing all 78 on board. |
| November 8, 1961 | L-049 | N2737A | IA Flight 201/8 | 77 | Destroyed followed an attempted emergency landing at Byrd Airport, Richmond, Virginia, United States, 74 passengers and two crew died. |
| November 11, 1961 | L-749 | HH-ABA | —N/a | 3 | Disappeared over the Caribbean on a cargo flight between San Juan, Puerto Rico, and Managua, Nicaragua. A crew of three were lost with the aircraft. |
| March 3, 1962 | L-049 | PP-PCR | —N/a | None | Written off after landing with a missing nose wheel. The aircraft was withdrawn from use and stored until it was broken up in 1969. |
| March 15, 1962 | L-1049H | N6911C | FTL Flight 7816 | 1 | Crashed at Adak Island NAS due to pilot error, killing one of seven on board. |
| March 16, 1962 | L-1049H | N6921C | FTL Flight 739 | 107 | Disappeared over the Pacific, all 107 aboard presumed lost. |
| April 26, 1962 | L-749 | F-BAZE | —N/a | Unknown | Destroyed by a bomb while parked at Maison Blanche Airport. |
| April 26, 1962 | L-749 | N116A | —N/a | 5 | Crashed at Canton Island Airport, Kiribati while attempting a go-around during a training flight after a propeller reversed, killing five of the six on board. |
| August 9, 1962 | WV-2 | 141324 | —N/a | 5 | Crashed while landing at Patuxent River NAS in heavy rain, killing five of 19 on board. This plane was part of the Airborne Early Warning Training Unit, Atlantic (AEWTULANT). |
| September 23, 1962 | L-1049H | N6923C | FTL Flight 923 | 28 | Ditched 500 mi off Ireland due to double engine failure and crew error, killing 28 of 76 on board. |
| December 4, 1962 | C-121G | 54-5066 | —N/a | 3 | Crashed on Guam while carrying supplies to the island after it was struck by a typhoon, killing three of eight on board. |
| December 14, 1962 | L-1049H | N6913C | FTL Flight 183 | 5 | Crashed on approach to Lockheed Air Terminal at Burbank due to pilot incapacitation, killing all five on board and three on the ground. |
| December 14, 1962 | L-049 | PP-PDE | —N/a | 50 | Crashed in the jungle en route from Belém-Val de Cans to Manaus-Ponta Pelada due to unknown causes. All 50 passengers and crew died. |
| January 11, 1963 | L-749 | F-BAZM | —N/a | 12 | Crashed into the side of Mount Plat near Périllos, France, killing all 12 crew. |
| February 3, 1963 | L-1049H | N9740Z | Slick Airways Flight 40Z | 4 | Struck approach lights at San Francisco International Airport and crashed, killing four of eight on board. |
| May 28, 1963 | L-1049G | N189S | Standard Airways Flight 388C | None | Spontaneous reverse pitch of an engine caused the right wing to dip and strike the ground just before landing at Manhattan Municipal Airport in Kansas. All on board evacuated safely but the aircraft was destroyed |
| March 1, 1964 | L-049 | N86504 | Paradise Airlines Flight 901A | 85 | Crashed near Lake Tahoe Airport after the pilot deviated from VFR procedures while attempting an approach in poor visibility, killing all 85 on board in the worst-ever accident involving the L-049. |
| October 4, 1964 | L-749 | LX-IOK | —N/a | 1 | Ran off the runway while landing at Bole Airport, killing one of seven crew. |
| December 24, 1964 | L-1049H | N6915C | FTL Flight 282 | 3 | Crashed into Sweeney's Ridge immediately after takeoff from San Francisco International Airport due to an unexplained course change, killing all three on board. |
| July 11, 1965 | EC-121H | 55-0136 | —N/a | 16 | Ditched off Nantucket after one engine failed and another caught fire. The fuselage broke into three pieces. Three survivors were found along with nine dead, but seven were never found. |
| December 4, 1965 | L-1049 | N6218C | EAL Flight 853 | 4 (Note: This figure just includes those lost on Flight 853) | Collided in mid-air with Trans World Airlines Flight 42 (N748TW), a Boeing 707-131B en route from San Francisco International Airport to John F. Kennedy International Airport, over North Salem, NY, at approximately 11,000 feet. The Eastern Constellation was uncontrollable through its normal flight controls but was guided to a crash landing using only throttles. The Captain and three of the 49 passengers died in the accident. The TWA Boeing landed safely. |
| December 15, 1965 | L-1049H | N6914C | FTL Flight 914 | 3 | Crashed into California Peak due to spatial disorientation, killing all three on board. |
| April 27, 1966 | L-749 | OBR771 | LANSA Flight 501 | 49 | Crashed into a mountain side in the Tomas District of Peru. All 49 passengers and crew on board are killed. |
| November 11, 1966 | EC-121H | 55-5262 | —N/a | 19 | Crashed into the Atlantic 125 mi off Nantucket, killing all 19 on board. Aircraft from USAF 551st Airborne Early Warning & Control Wing; Squadron personnel from 961st Airborne Early Warning and Control Squadron and 551st Electronic and Maintenance Squadron. |
| December 18, 1966 | L-1649 | N7301C | —N/a | 17 | Crashed while on approach to Eldorado Airport due to pilot error, killing 17 of 59 on board. |
| April 17, 1967 | L-1049H | N7777C | —N/a | None | Crashed on landing at Kotzebue Airport, Alaska after the pilot failed to lower the landing gear; all 32 passengers and crew on board survived, but the aircraft was written off. |
| April 25, 1967 | C-121H | 53-0549 | —N/a | 15 | Crashed 1 mi off Nantucket due to an engine fire, killing 15 of 16 on board. |
| June 22, 1967 | L-1049H | N6936C | —N/a | 7 | Collided with a USAF RF-4C Phantom II, 65-0861, and crashed near Tan Son Nhat International Airport, killing all seven on board; both F-4 crew members ejected safely. |
| January 1968 | L-1049G | 5T-TAC | —N/a | 5 | Crashed on approach to Port Harcourt Airport, killing five. |
| March 30, 1968 | L-1049G | HP-467 | —N/a | 3 | Crashed on climbout after the number three engine caught fire, killing the three crew. |
| July 1, 1968 | L-1049G | 5T-TAG | —N/a | 4 | Crashed short of the runway at Uli Airstrip, killing all four on board. |
| April 15, 1969 | EC-121M | 135749 | —N/a | 31 | Shot down by two North Korean MiG-17s over the Sea of Japan off Chongjin, North Korea, killing all 31 on board. |
| April 25, 1969 | EC-121R | 67-21493 | BATCAT 21 | 18 | Crashed near Korat AFB after encountering windshear, killing all 18 on board. |
| August 3, 1969 | L-1049H | CF-NAJ | —N/a | 4 | Crashed on landing at Uli Airstrip, killing the four crew. |
| August 9, 1969 | L-1049G | F-BGNC | —N/a | 4 | Disappeared after being cleared for a semi-direct ILS approach to Douala Airport. The wreckage was found 80 km (50 mi) northeast of Douala three days later; all four crew died. |
| September 6, 1969 | EC-121R | 67-21495 | BATCAT 19 | 4 | Descended below the glide scope and crashed short of the runway at Korat AFB, killing four of 16 on board; four on the ground also die. |
| November 28, 1969 | L-749 | 5N-85H | —N/a | 8 | Crashed into Mount Toubkal, Atlas Mountains, Morocco, 60 miles south of Marrakesh due to triple engine failure, killing all eight on board. The Constellation, which was carrying weapons to Biafra, was discovered on July 18, 1970, by mountaineers. |

=== 1970–1998 ===
Most models of the Lockheed Constellation were retired in the late 1970s by operators in favor of more modern aircraft. The last commercial flight of the L-1049 Super Constellation was in 1993, when the Federal Aviation Administration banned all airlines from the Dominican Republic that flew Constellations to the United States (due to safety concerns). The Dominican airlines were the last operators of any version of the Constellation.

| Date | Type | Call sign | Flight | Fatalities | Info |
|---|---|---|---|---|---|
| March 16, 1970 | EC-121K | 145927 | —N/a | 23 | Crashed at Da Nang Airport, killing 23 of 28 on board. |
| October 8, 1970 | C-121J | 131644 | —N/a | None | Crash landed near McMurdo Station, Ross Island, Antarctica in a snowstorm. Everyone on board survived with minimal injuries, and the aircraft has remained in situ at the base's airfield, which has since been named Pegasus Field after the aircraft. |
| October 20, 1971 | L-1049H | N564E | —N/a | 4 | Crashed in the sea off Great Inagua, Bahamas after beginning a descent, killing the four crew. |
| May 29, 1972 | L-149 | PP-PDG | —N/a | 9 | Crashed shortly after takeoff from Campo International Airport due to a refueling error, killing nine of 18 on board. |
| June 9, 1973 | L-1049H | N173W | —N/a | 3 | Sank back on climbout, struck trees and crashed, killing the three crew. The flaps were selected up too soon due to crew fatigue. The aircraft was used for pesticide spraying to control spruce budworm. |
| August 5, 1973 | L-1049 | N6202C | —N/a | None | Lost power on all four engines due to fuel starvation and made a forced landing in Tamarac, Florida on approach to Fort Lauderdale. The aircraft was damaged beyond repair. |
| September 24, 1973 | L-1049H | N566E | —N/a | None | Suffered left main gear collapse after a heavy landing. |
| December 15, 1973 | L-1049H | N6917C | —N/a | 3 | Crashed into a residential neighborhood two minutes after takeoff from Runway 9L at Miami International Airport, Florida. The Super Constellation was carrying a cargo of Christmas trees to Caracas, Venezuela. All three people on board were killed, along with six people on the ground. Witnesses reported that on takeoff, the aircraft abruptly rotated to an unusually high pitch attitude, failed to accelerate, and failed to climb above 120 feet. Although the NTSB was unable to determine the reason or reasons for this adverse flight condition, it stated that factors which may have contributed to the crash include improper loading, a rearward movement of unsecured cargo resulting in a center of gravity shift aft of the allowable limit, and deficient crew coordination. |
| June 3, 1975 | L-1049H | N6931C | —N/a | None | Written off at Guadeloupe following an emergency landing during a ferry flight from Fort de France to Fort Lauderdale. The aircraft was withdrawn from use and broken up in 1979. |
| May 11, 1975 | L-1049H | N45516 | —N/a | 6 | While being ferried from Mesa to Kansas City, the aircraft struck trees and a playhouse while attempting a forced landing after all four engines lost power, killing all six on board. A lack of anti-detonation injection (ADI) fluid caused the engines to overheat. |
| May 19, 1976 | L-1049H | N468C | —N/a | None | Crash-landed in Belize while being ferried from Honduras to Miami. The number 1 engine threw its propeller, striking the number 2 engine. The pilot diverted to Belize, landing with the left main gear partially retracted. The three aircrew survived, but the L-1049 was written off. Mennonite farmers purchased the wreckage, and after disassembling and trucking it across Belize, used the hydraulics for a hydroelectric dam project, and the fuselage for a barn. The fuselage section currently sits on an escarpment looking over a valley, being used as storage for a mechanic yard. |
| March 15, 1978 | EC-121T | 55-0121 | —N/a | None | Caught fire and burned out after the left main landing gear suddenly collapsed during taxi at NAS Keflavik. |
| October 15, 1978 | L-1049H | N6924C | —N/a | 1 | Crashed on takeoff from Almirante Padilla Airport after the landing gear was raised too soon, killing one of three crew. |
| August 31, 1979 | L-049 | HI-260 | —N/a | None | Damaged beyond repair by Hurricane David while parked at Las Americas International Airport. The aircraft was broken up in July 1980. |
| June 22, 1980 | L-1049H | N74CA | —N/a | 3 | Crashed on take-off while being ferried from Bakalar municipal airport in Columbus Indiana to Seattle-Tacoma Airport, en route to Alaska. Retired Lockheed test pilot Herman R. Salmon, along with one other crew member and a passenger were killed. There were five survivors including Salmon's son, copilot Randall Salmon. |
| October 26, 1981 | L-749 | HI-328 | —N/a | 3 | Crashed in the sea while on approach to St. Thomas Airport due to pilot error, killing three of five on board. |
| April 5, 1990 | C-121C | HI-515CT | —N/a | 1 | Ditched off Levittown, Puerto Rico following triple engine failure, killing one of three crew. |
| February 3, 1992 | L-1049H | HI-542CT | —N/a | None | Struck by an out-of-control Douglas C-54 (N74AF) that had suffered hydraulic failure while taxiing. |
| September 22, 1998 | C-121C | HI-548CT | —N/a | None | Written off at Santo Domingo after a Curtiss C-46 (HI-503CT) was blown into it during Hurricane Georges. The aircraft was broken up in early 1999. |
