= Bell Shimada =

Bell Shimada may refer to:

- Bell M. Shimada (1922–1958), American fisheries scientist
- NOAAS Bell M. Shimada (R 227), a U.S. National Oceanic and Atmospheric Administration research ship commissioned in 2010
