= Early life and career of Gene Roddenberry =

American television screenwriter, producer (1921–1991)

Gene Roddenberry
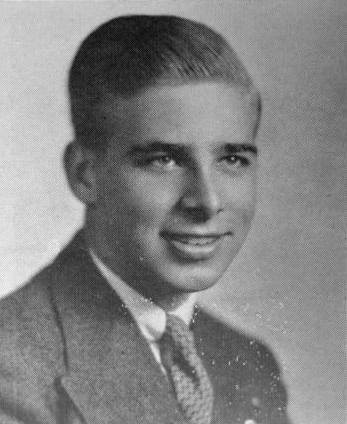
- Gene Roddenberry in 1939, during his senior year at high school
- Born: Eugene Wesley Roddenberry; August 19, 1921; El Paso, Texas, U.S.
- Died: October 24, 1991 (aged 70); Santa Monica, California, U.S.
- Education: Los Angeles City College
- Spouse(s): Eileen-Anita Rexroat (1942–1969); Majel Barrett (1969–his death, 1991)
- Children: 3, including Rod Roddenberry
- Military career
- Allegiance: United States
- Branch: United States Army Air Forces
- Service years: 1941–1945
- Rank: Captain
- Unit: 394th Bombardment Squadron
- Conflicts: World War II
- Awards: Air Medal; Distinguished Flying Cross

Eugene Wesley "Gene" Roddenberry (August 19, 1921 – October 24, 1991) was an American television screenwriter, producer and futurist best remembered for creating the original Star Trek television series. He was born in El Paso, Texas, but grew up in Los Angeles, California, where his father worked as a police officer. While at school, the young Roddenberry majored in police science and became interested in aeronautical engineering.

He obtained a pilot's license through the Civilian Pilot Training Program. Following his graduation, he signed up for the United States Army Air Corps and he enlisted after the attack on Pearl Harbor. He was commissioned on August 5, 1942, and was posted to the Pacific Theater of Operations where he joined the 394th Bomb Squadron, 5th Bombardment Group, of the Thirteenth Air Force. He flew Boeing B-17 Flying Fortress in an estimated 89 combat missions. After being rotated back to the United States he was promoted to Captain and became an air crash investigator. During his military career, he was involved in two plane crashes and was awarded both the Air Medal and the Distinguished Flying Cross.

Once a civilian, he began to fly long-haul routes for Pan American World Airways. He was involved in a further crash in June 1947, where the Clipper Eclipse crashed in the Syrian desert. After pulling injured passengers out of the burning plane, he led the party which sought help. After a further incident, he resigned from Pan-Am, seeking to write for television instead. However, he joined the Los Angeles Police Department, initially in the traffic division but transferred to the newspaper unit where he worked with Chief William H. Parker as a speech writer. He landed the role of technical adviser for a television version of Mr. District Attorney, which led to him writing scripts for the series under the pseudonym of "Robert Wesley". This led to a series of collaborations with Ziv Television Programs, and he resigned from the police on June 7, 1956, in order to take up a writing position on the staff of The West Point Story.

== Early life (1921–1941) ==
Gene Roddenberry was born on August 19, 1921, in his parents' rented home in El Paso, Texas, the first child of Eugene Edward Roddenberry and Caroline "Glen" (née Goleman) Roddenberry. He was named after his father and referred to as "Little" Gene. Roddenberry would later describe his father as "very intelligent" but a "very common man". At the time of Gene's birth, his father was working as a linesman, but shortly afterward he rode the rails to Los Angeles to seek better employment. Roddenberry's father joined the Los Angeles Police Department as an emergency appointee on December 7, 1922. The following March he sent a message to his wife to tell her to come to Los Angeles with their son. Two months later, Gene Sr. passed the Civil Service test and was given a police commission.

The elder Roddenberry became a patrolman, and held that rank for the next twenty years. The family expanded with the birth of Robert Leon Roddenberry in 1924, and Doris Willodean Roddenberry in 1925. During this time, the Roddenberrys bought their first home at 3243 Drew Street. During Gene's early years, he was saved by a quick thinking milkman who noticed that the house was on fire. He pounded on the door until Glen awoke and rushed out of the house with the children in tow. Roddenberry's father kept rabbits, and the children sold them outside the house. It was these animals that became the subject of Roddenberry's first published work in his school's twice-yearly newspaper, The Ace. During his childhood, Roddenberry was interested in reading, especially pulp magazines, and was a fan of stories such as John Carter of Mars, Tarzan, and the Skylark series by E. E. Smith.

In 1933, when Roddenberry was twelve years old, the family moved to 4906 Monte Vista in the shadow of Mount Washington, and he began attending Luther Burbank Junior High School. This was the house that Roddenberry would later describe as his childhood home. His father helped the boys obtain local jobs; Gene worked as a newspaper delivery boy and as a gas station attendant on Saturdays, and after school. The young Roddenberry moved to Franklin High School during the middle years of the Great Depression. His father was relatively unaffected by the Great Depression because of his stable employment with the police department. The family distributed food to friends and family who were in need. Glen's parents and her younger sister Willodean moved into the house for a time before finding other accommodation in Redondo Beach. During his time at Franklin, Roddenberry joined the Varsity Debate Team and was a member of the Authors Club under Mrs. Virginia Church. He graduated in 1939.

He attended Los Angeles City College from 1939 onward. Although Roddenberry ranked at or above the ninetieth percentile on an intelligence test, and in the 99th percentile on a reading test administered as part of his college entrance examination, he elected to major in the "solidly blue collar" police science curriculum; (Note: Studio biographies have erroneously credited Roddenberry as taking pre-law at Los Angeles City College, before switching to a major in engineering at the UCLA.) as president of the school's Police Club, he communicated with police liaison Stanley Sheldon. During his second year, he developed an interest in aeronautical engineering and obtained a pilot's license through the United States Army Air Corps-sponsored Civilian Pilot Training Program. He graduated from Los Angeles City College with an Associate of Arts degree in police science on June 26, 1941, becoming the first member of his family to earn a college degree. After graduating, he traveled to March Air Base and signed up for the Army Air Corps; due to the lack of training spaces, his entrance was delayed. For the remainder of the summer, he attended Peace Officer training at the University of California, Los Angeles as an Army cadet.

== Military service and civil aviation (1941–1948) ==
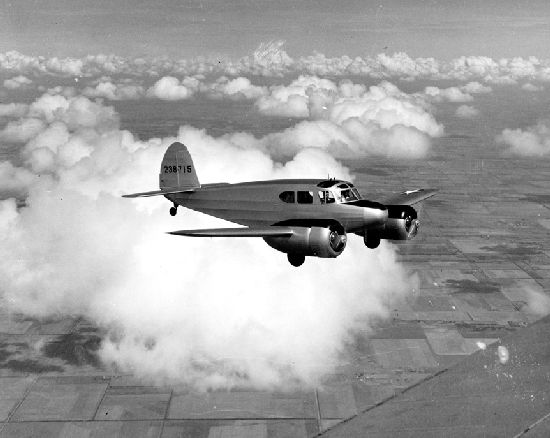
Roddenberry flew Cessna AT-17 Bobcats (pictured) while his deployment was delayed.

In the days following the attack on Pearl Harbor, Roddenberry received a telegram with orders to attend Kelly Air Force Base, enlisting on December 18, 1941. Following the completion of boot camp, he was sent to Corsicana, Texas, for pilot training by civilian instructors. He completed sixty hours of flight time there, including thirty-two solo hours. In March 1942, he moved to Goodfellow Field (now Goodfellow Air Force Base) in San Angelo, Texas, for basic flight training where he flew a Vultee BT-13 Valiant. Roddenberry completed training on August 5, and was commissioned as a second lieutenant.

His initial posting to the Pacific Theater was delayed by a month, during which he completed further training on the Cessna AT-17 Bobcat. By virtue of this additional training, and because Roddenberry's height made it unlikely that he would be suitable for a combat fighter pilot, he was assigned to bombers. He received orders to report to Bellows Field, Oahu, to join the 394th Bomb Squadron, 5th Bombardment Group, of the Thirteenth Air Force. The squadron flew the Boeing B-17 Flying Fortress, which had previously been used by the 19th Bomb Group, and were en route to a maintenance overhaul when they had to flee due to the Japanese invasion of the Philippines. Roddenberry was assigned as Captain William Ripley's co-pilot for the flight that the squadron took to Christmas Island, and the following day to Canton Island. An additional flight on November 17 took the squadron to Nadi, Fiji, where they were expected to go on to the New Hebrides. Instead they were ordered to remain in Nadi to fly reconnaissance missions.

In January 1943, the squadron was ordered to conduct bombing missions, alternating between bases in Espiritu Santo, Nadi, and Guadalcanal. These missions consisted of teams of four to eight planes, with no fighter support. It was during these flights that Roddenberry faced Japanese fighters for the first time. On August 2, 1943, while flying out of Espiritu Santo, Roddenberry was piloting a B-17 when the plane had a malfunction during take off. He applied the brakes to stop the aircraft but they did not respond. The tail brake was applied but it also failed. The plane overshot the runway by 500 feet (150 m) and impacted trees, crushing the nose, and starting a fire. Bombardier Sgt. John P. Kruger and navigator Lt. Talbert H. Wollam were both positioned in the nose and died on impact. While an official report absolved Roddenberry of any responsibility, there were those in the squadron who blamed him for the men's deaths. Early in September 1943, the squadron was rotated back to the United States. The crew was transported on an old Dutch freighter across the Pacific; upon his arrival, and reunion with his wife, his picture was featured in the Los Angeles Times.

Roddenberry spent the remainder of his military career in the United States, and while he did not keep an ongoing record, he estimated that he had flown 89 combat missions. This number was disputed by the records of the Army Air Corps and other members of the 394th Bomber Squadron. For example, one pilot in the same bomb group as Roddenberry flew eighty missions, but took three times longer than Roddenberry had claimed to do so. In October, he was assigned to Fort Worth, Texas, and then the 18th Replacement Wing at Salt Lake City. He was subsequently moved to the Office of Flight Safety based in Oakland, California. Following promotion to captain, Roddenberry was reassigned to March Field (situated near Riverside, California) as a plane crash investigator in February 1944. During this period (characterized by frequent travel throughout the United States), he was in another accident as a passenger on a military flight that crashed and caught fire. Roddenberry pulled three men to safety. Throughout his military career, he was awarded the Air Medal and the Distinguished Flying Cross.

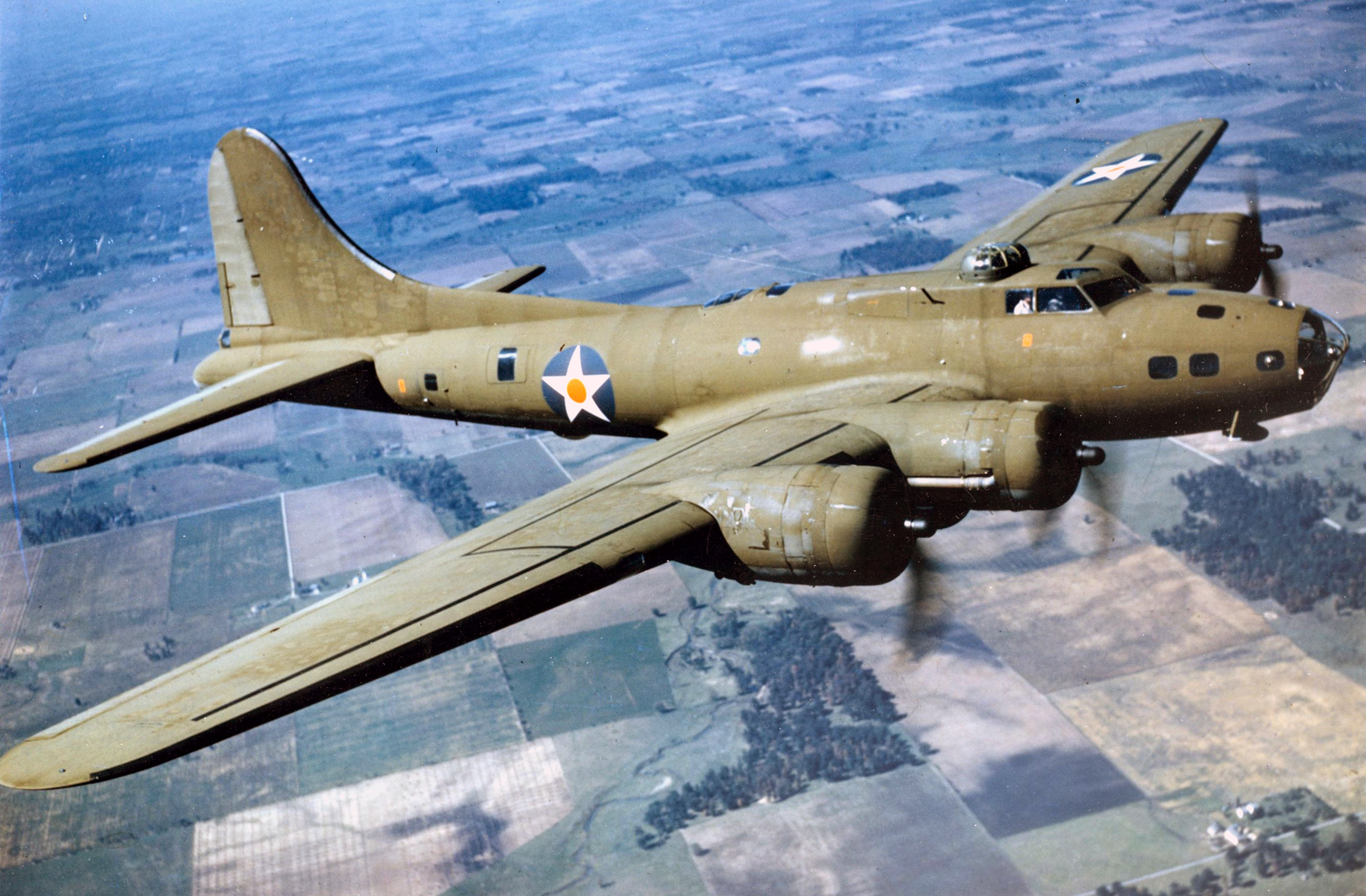
During his operational military career, Roddenberry flew B-17 Flying Fortresses for the 394th Bomb Squadron, which was equipped with the B-17E model.

In March 1945, he applied to the Civil Aeronautics Administration for a commercial pilot's licence. He was subsequently certified to fly both single- and multi-engine aircraft between 225 and 1500 horsepower. Before being discharged from the Army Air Force in July 1945, he began to fly for Pan American World Airways. He was based first in Miami, before moving to New York City for their long-haul flights. He began to fly routes from New York to Johannesburg or Calcutta, the two longest Pan Am routes at the time. He and his wife Eileen lived in River Edge, New Jersey. He continued to pursue his dream of writing, and had a poem published in the opinion section of The New York Times on June 17, 1943. During his time with the airline, he took two extension courses at Columbia University in the spring of 1946.

On June 18, 1947, he got a seat on the Clipper Eclipse in Karachi, Pakistan (then in India), for a flight to Istanbul with the designation Pan Am Flight 121. Five hours into the flight, the number one engine developed a fault and was shut down. The plane was able to fly on three engines. However, they began to overheat, and the pilot descended to a lower altitude to allow the engines to cool. A second engine caught fire, and fire suppressant measures failed to extinguish it. While the pilot attempted to land the plane, Roddenberry went to the cabin to calm the passengers. He was certain at the time that he was going to die, as the engine fell from the wing, exposing fuel lines, causing the fire to spread. The plane descended rapidly. As he unbuckled himself from a seat to calm a woman, it crashed in the Syrian Desert. Though he had two broken ribs, he began to evacuate passengers from the burning plane with the other crew. Roddenberry had to force the broken seatbelt of the Maharani of Phaltan open so that she could leave the plane. He repeatedly re-entered the plane to pull out more passengers; some were burning and he used pillows to extinguish the flames. The wind turned, causing the fire to engulf the plane, and he was unable to make any further trips. Roddenberry took charge in the aftermath, and, after a group of local tribesmen proved to be of no help, he formed two teams to search for civilization. The team he led trekked four miles across the desert to the town of Mayadin, where he telephoned the emergency landing strip at Deir ez-Zor, some 38 miles (61 km) away. In response, the Syrian Army dispatched planes with medical teams to the crash site. Roddenberry returned to the site to assist the survivors. Fourteen people died in the crash; eleven passengers needed hospital treatment, eight were unharmed.

Two weeks later, the Syrian authorities allowed Roddenberry to return to the United States. This near-death experience had increased his desire to have children, and Eileen became pregnant shortly after his return. While back in the U.S., he testified at a Civil Aviation Authority inquiry in New York alongside two other surviving crew members. All three were commended for their work following the crash for: "devotion to duty, their calmness and efficiency in the difficult and hazardous experience." The crash investigation questioned the maintenance of the plane's engines, as issues with them had been identified on a previous flight. The Roddenberrys' first child, Darleen Anita, was born on April 4, 1948, and Eileen expressed concerns, following the crash, about raising the child alone. After the birth, Roddenberry continued to fly for Pan-Am, but another incident, while flying out of La Guardia Airport, marked the end of his career as a pilot. On a particularly cold and snowy day, the controls froze during takeoff, almost causing the plane to stall. He resigned from Pan-Am on May 15, 1948, and decided to pursue his dream of writing, particularly for the new medium of television.

== Police service and burgeoning writing career ==
Gene Roddenberry
- Police career
- Country: United States
- Department: Los Angeles Police Department
- Service years: 1949–1956
- Rank: Sworn in as an Officer – February 1, 1949; Sergeant I – 1953.

On arriving back in Los Angeles, the Roddenberry family lived initially with Gene's parents at 2710 Green Street, Temple City. He obtained employment as a sales manager with the Tri-Vision Corporation in Alhambra, which sold stereo "3-D" cameras. However, he realized that this would only be temporary and sought more permanent employment elsewhere. Roddenberry applied for a position with the Los Angeles Police Department on January 10, 1949, quitting Tri-Vision the following day. He was enrolled in the department on February 1 and given badge number 6089. His initial training was completed on March 16, and he spent the following sixteen months in the traffic division. Roddenberry was subsequently transferred to the newspaper unit. His first job, in his new role as a writer, was to write press releases and teach traffic safety. Roddenberry's father had worked with Deputy Chief William H. Parker, who was promoted to LAPD Chief on August 9, 1950, and Gene became friends with him.

As part of Parker's modernization efforts, the newspaper unit became the "Public Information Division" with Captain Stanley Sheldon in charge. He and Gene had known each other since Roddenberry attended Los Angeles City College. Roddenberry became Parker's speech writer, and wrote of the Chief's professional philosophy in the in-house magazine, The Beat, in September 1952. He reputedly based the Star Trek character Spock on Parker's rational and unemotional behavior. In this new office, he worked alongside Don Ingells, who would go on to create Fantasy Island, and write episodes for Star Trek such as "The Alternative Factor". The Association for Professional Law Enforcement was founded on November 12, 1952, with Roddenberry as one of the founding members and spokesman. He said at the time that: "We are of the opinion that professional ethics and practical police work are completely compatible and we intend to meet together to promote this compatibility." Following this, Roddenberry began a correspondence with Erle Stanley Gardner, creator of the Perry Mason novels. The duo would record audio letters and send them to each other. Gardner forwarded Roddenberry's comments to Harry Steeger, who felt that he and Roddenberry had similar opinions on law enforcement. Gardner began to seek Roddenberry's opinion of his work, including allowing him a preview of The Court of Last Resort.

Over time, Roddenberry sought to earn more money for his family. In 1951, he requested permission to take a second job which he described as "of a dignified nature"; it was as a freezer salesman for the Amana Corporation. He was turned down, but found another way to earn money. The Dragnet radio series and 1951 television series sourced their stories from the LAPD, and Roddenberry gathered stories from his colleagues on the force and wrote them up for submission to the show, splitting the $100 payment evenly if they sold. This extra income was substantial for the time, as he earned only $400 a month from the Department. The Roddenberry's second child, Dawn Allison, was born on August 31, 1953.

Later that year, Captain Sheldon gave Roddenberry an additional position as technical adviser for a new television version of Mr. District Attorney. Having spent the intervening years dissecting any scripts he could get his hands on, and comparing them to the television output, Roddenberry advised the head of the studio's story department that he could write scripts as good as the ones they were using. He submitted his first script on October 22, 1953, under his pseudonym "Robert Wesley". It went into production as episode 9b, "Defense Plant Gambling". On December 1, he made a further request to the LAPD for a second job as a free-lance writer and adviser. This time it was approved. He later said, during the production of the second season of Star Trek, that the pseudonym was used after a fortune cookie revealed a message saying: "A change of name will bring you fame."

Roddenberry took his Sergeant's exam in early 1954 passing on the first attempt. At the same time, he wrote a second script for Mr. District Attorney titled "Wife Killer", for which he was paid $700. During his six-month probation as Sergeant, he became friends with Wilbur Clingan, who would later have the Klingon race named after him. He sold another script entitled "Police Academy" in July. The sales of the three scripts amounted to the equivalent of nearly fifty-percent of his Sergeant's yearly salary of $5,000. The following December, he began to write the script for his first work of science fiction, which was eventually called The Secret Defense of 117. With Ricardo Montalbán as lead, it was aired two years later as part of an anthology package, with the screenplay again credited to Robert Wesley. This was his first collaboration with Ziv Television Programs. He submitted a science fiction script "The Transporter" on January 4, 1955, which was not purchased, but sold several scripts through the rest of the year: "Court Escape", "Patrol Boat", and "Police Brutality" for Mr. District Attorney, and "Reformed Criminal", "Human Bomb", and "Mental Patient" for Ziv's Highway Patrol. In early 1956, he sold two-story ideas for I Led Three Lives, and he found that it was becoming increasingly difficult to be a writer as well as a policeman.

Ziv offered Roddenberry a writing position for a series it was developing called The West Point Story. He informed Parker that he was intending to resign in order to join the writing staff. To his surprise, the Chief revealed that he had been intentionally connecting Roddenberry with television professionals for the past few years with the hope that one would offer him a permanent position so that he could pursue his dream of writing. On June 7, 1956, he resigned from the force to concentrate on his writing career. In his brief letter of resignation, Roddenberry wrote: "I find myself unable to support my family at present on anticipated police salary levels in a manner we consider necessary. Having spent slightly more than seven years on this job, during all of which fair treatment and enjoyable working conditions were received, this decision is made with considerable and genuine regret."
