= Vesteris Seamount =

Seamount in the North Atlantic Ocean

Vesteris
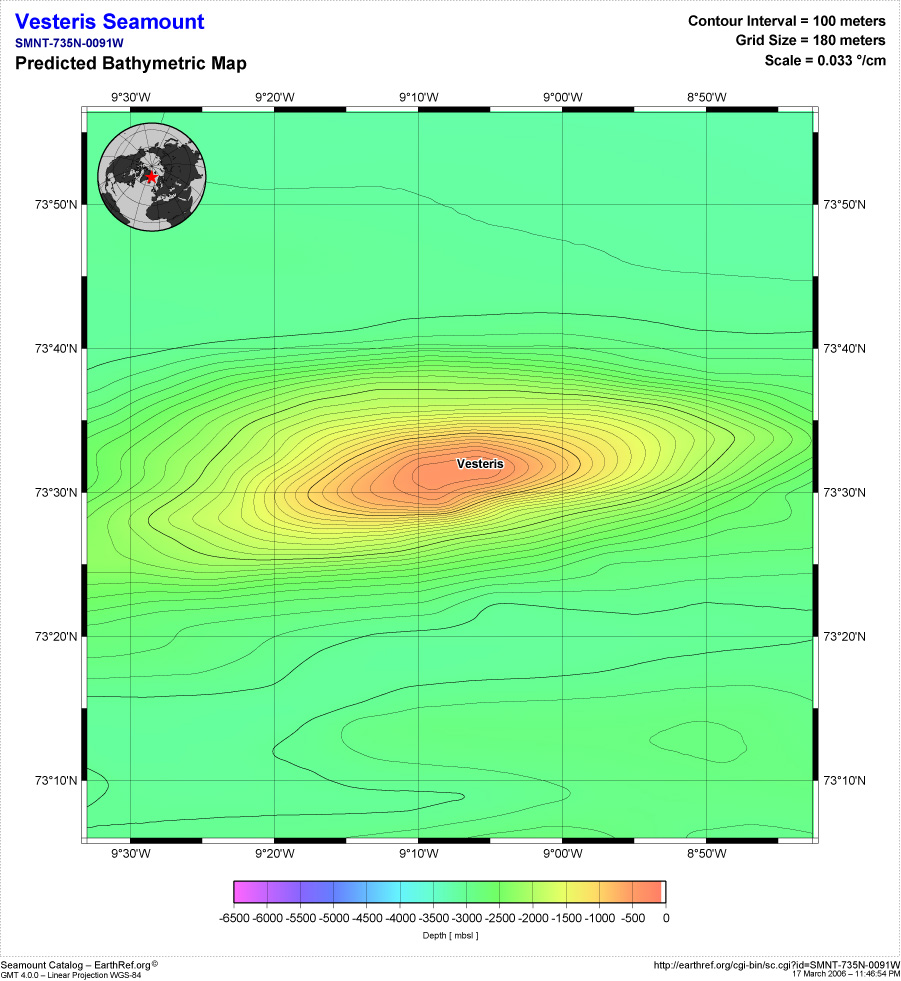
- Summit depth: 133 metres (436 ft)
- Height: 3,000 metres (9,800 ft)

Location
- Coordinates: 73°31′10.2″N 9°6′47.2″W

Geology
- Type: Volcano
- Last activity: Possibly hydrothermal
- Last eruption: Possibly 6,000-5,000 years ago

Vesteris Seamount, also known as Vesteris Bank, is a seamount in the Greenland Sea of the North Atlantic Ocean between Greenland and Norway. It lies north of Jan Mayen and rises from 41 to 43 million years old ocean crust. The reasons for the volcanic activity at Vesteris are unclear and may involve lithospheric processes.

It is a volcano formed chiefly by basanitic rocks and has an erosion-flattened top. The seamount is covered by lava flows and subsidiary cones. The seamount started developing no earlier than 13 million years ago and eruptions continued until the Pleistocene/Holocene transition; there were a number of eruptions in the last 60,000 years. Whether there was Holocene activity 5,000–6,000 years ago or present-day hydrothermal activity is unclear.

A variety of lifeforms are found both on Vesteris Seamount and within its rocks. Layers of sponges and bryozoans cover the upper parts of the seamount and form structures like mounds. This ecosystem has been compared to coral reefs.

== History ==
Vesteris Seamount was probably known to fishers and seal hunters for over a hundred years as there is a large amount of fish above Vesteris Seamount, which draws both seals and fishers alike to the seamount. The seamount was originally named Vesterisbanken by Eggvin 1963, which showed Vesteris on his bathymetric map.

== Geography and geology ==
The seamount is located in the Greenland Sea-Norwegian Sea, west of due north from Jan Mayen Island 280 kilometres (170 mi) away and in between Norway and Greenland which is 300 kilometres (190 mi) from Vesteris Seamount.

Vesteris Seamount is an isolated volcanic seamount that reaches a depth of 133 metres (436 ft) below sea level and with two summits that rise from a plateau at 200 metres (660 ft) depth; it is likely that the summit once emerged from the sea. The summit area of the seamount is flat, probably due to wave erosion during the Weichselian glaciation, and sediment cover is scarce. Lava flows extend from the summit area to depths of almost 2,500 metres (8,200 ft), and sheet flows, scarps, pillow lavas, lava tubes and lava debris have been observed on the seamount. Carbonate sediments cover its top.

The seamount is elongated in about northeast–south-southwest direction, with ridges radiating from its northern sector and the lower southern sector spreading southwestward like a tongue. This elongation matches the trend of magnetic lineations on the surrounding seafloor, implying that it may be controlled by the surrounding tectonic environment. The submarine slopes of the seamount are quite steep and show two benches at 1,300 metres (4,300 ft) and 2,200 metres (7,200 ft) depth. The seamount has dimensions of 33 by 61 kilometres (21 mi × 38 mi) on the seafloor. About 15–20 parasitic vents dot the deeper flanks of the seamount and reach 0.5 kilometres (0.31 mi) height, and small ridges en echelon to Vesteris are found on the southeastern flank. The total volume of the seamount is about 500 cubic kilometres (120 cu mi)-800 cubic kilometres (190 cu mi).

The seamount rises about 3 kilometres (1.9 mi) above the seafloor which below Vesteris has an age of about 43-41 million years. The Mohns Ridge lies c. 400 kilometres (250 mi) east and the Kolbeinsey Ridge c. 250 kilometres (160 mi) south of Vesteris, while the Jan Mayen fracture zone crosses the ocean floor south of the seamount; the Jan Mayen Fracture Zone connects the Mohns and Kolbeinsey Ridges – both part of the Mid-Atlantic Ridge – with each other. A channel created presumably by turbidites from Greenland passes northward west of Vesteris. There is no evidence of additional volcanic edifices in the neighbourhood of the seamount, although recent volcanic intrusions may occur in the direct neighbourhood of the seamount.

=== Composition ===
Volcanic rocks dredged from Vesteris include basanite as the major component, benmoreite, phonotephrite and tephrite but also alkali basalt, mugearite and trachybasalt. Samples taken are porphyritic, rich in vesicles and contain phenocrysts of amphibole, clinopyroxene, kaersutite, olivine and plagioclase; these minerals also make up the groundmass of the rocks.

These volcanic rocks define two separate geochemical suites, one formed by the basanites-tephrites and the other by the alkali basalts-mugearites. The formation of these two magma suites has been explained with fractional crystallization processes, mixing between different magmas and partial melting. The composition of Vesteris magmas has been modelled to include an Archean mantle component and an Iceland hotspot component. Geochemical patterns indicate that the source magmas of Vesteris have similar sources as the magmas involved in other volcanoes of the North Atlantic north of Iceland. Differences between volcanic rocks erupted earlier in the history of the volcano and more recent products may imply that magma chemistry changed over time.

Aside from primary volcanic rocks, drop stones carried to the seamount by icebergs have been found on Vesteris as well.

=== Origin of the volcanism ===
Vesteris Seamount is an intraplate volcano. Several different theories have been proposed to explain its origin:

- One theory presumes that mantle melts could rise through the lithosphere in cracks generated by the tectonics of the Mid-Atlantic Ridge and that this process is responsible for the formation of Vesteris Seamount. The elongated shape of the seamount and the parallelism with other bathymetric features in the region supports the idea that the seamount formed on a zone of crustal weakness.
- The seamount was at first proposed to have originated over a Jan Mayen hotspot, although there are notable differences in composition. An origin at a mantle plume was considered improbably, even if the recent volcanism were to be considered rejuvenated. There is no evidence of a hotspot track but a surrounding uplifted area might be the surface expression of a plume that may be connected to the Iceland hotspot.
- It may have formed at the Mid-Atlantic Ridge, but based on its shallow depth and the young radiometric ages it appears to be a younger feature. Sedimentation patterns around the seamount also do not support a formation in a near-ridge environment.

== Eruption history ==
Vesteris Seamount was active for no longer time than the last 13-7 million years; volcanic activity at the seamount occurred in episodic stages. A three-stage model has been proposed, with the last stage forming the shallow parts of the seamount. Rock samples from the summit area have yielded ages of about 110,000 years ago, while argon-argon dating has shown that trachybasalts and trachytes were erupted 650,000–500,000 years ago and the mugearites between 85,000 and 10,000 years ago.

Ash layers and traces of past hydrothermal activity suggest that Vesteris was active during the Quaternary, with frequent eruptions in the last 60,000 years. Some ash layers have been estimated to be less than 25,000 years old on the basis of the sedimentation rates albeit with great uncertainty, others were emplaced between 16,000 and 14,000 years ago and there is evidence of even younger ash layers including one emplaced around 11,900 years ago. Some ash layers may have been emplaced by pyroclastic flows or turbidity currents. During the last ice age when the summit of Vesteris Seamount was close to the sea surface, phreatomagmatic eruptions generated ash falls.

One ash layer has been found and appears to imply an eruption between 6,000 and 5,000 years ago although it is not certain that Holocene eruptions occurred; the most recent eruption may have occurred at the Pleistocene/Holocene boundary. If there was Holocene activity that would make Vesteris the only known Holocene seamount in the Arctic. There is no evidence for present-day or historic activity at Vesteris, although low temperature hydrothermal activity may be occurring.

== Biology and climate ==
Vesteris Seamount displays high biological productivity. The summit area of the seamount is densely inhabited by mats and biogenic structures formed by ascidians, bryozoans, polychaetes and sponges; in other sectors of the volcano sponges are accompanied by crinoids. Bryozoans and sponges make up most of the biogenic constructions, with Palmiskenea skenei the principal bryozoan. Actinians, ascidians, brittle stars, bryozoans, crustaceans, hydrozoans, molluscs, polychaetes, radiolarians, sea urchins, serpulids and starfish are also found, as well as foraminiferal sands. Similar lifeforms are also found on the lower slopes of the seamount. Traces of endolithic fungi have been found in rock samples from the seamount and worm tubes are found in the softer ground.

Life on Vesteris has formed a variety of structures, including hedges, mats, mounds, spurs and thickets, and a dense layer of biogenic sediments and living specimens covers large areas of the upper Vesteris Seamount. The fauna has been subdivided into three distinct zones according to their depth. This environment has been compared to a coral reef.

The seamount lies close to the polar front with the East Greenland Current transporting freshwater from ice melt and ice to the seamount. The sea above Vesteris is covered by sea ice for most of the year except for August and September, and water temperatures on the surface of the seamount are around −1–0 °C (30–32 °F) in summer. Sediment cores from Vesteris Seamount have been used to reconstruct climatic and oceanic conditions of the North Atlantic after the Last Glacial Maximum.

== See also ==
- Shimada Seamount
