= Aeronaves de México Flight 111 =

1958 aviation incident in Mexico

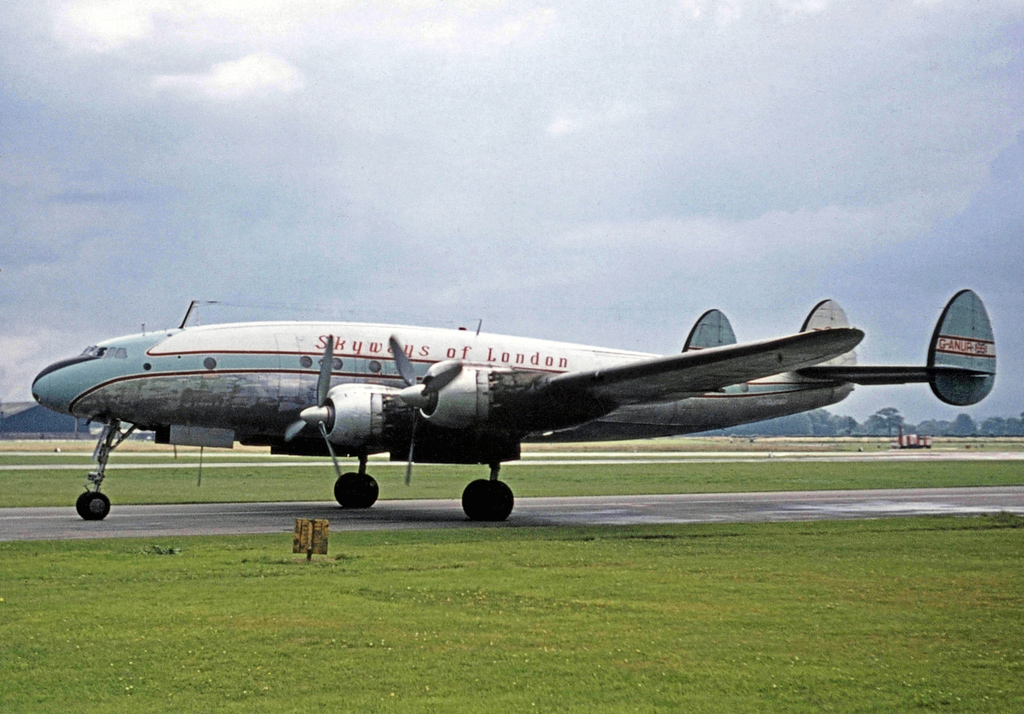
- A similar Lockheed L-749 Constellation

Accident
- Date: 2 June 1958
- Summary: Controlled flight into terrain due to Spatial disorientation while following an Instrument flight rule, argued mechanical failure (undetermined)
- Site: Cerro Latillas, west of Guadalajara International Airport. Municipality of Tlajomulco de Zúñiga, Jalisco 20°30′07″N 103°26′31″W

Aircraft
- Aircraft type: Lockheed Constellation L-749
- Operator: Aeronaves de México (now Aeroméxico)
- Registration: XA-MEV
- Flight origin: old Guadalajara Airport, Jalisco
- Destination: Mexico City International Airport, Mexico City
- Occupants: 45
- Passengers: 38
- Crew: 7
- Fatalities: 45
- Survivors: 0

Aeroméxico Flight 111 was a scheduled commercial flight from Tijuana to Acapulco with stopovers in Mazatlán, Guadalajara, and Mexico City. On June 2, 1958, the Lockheed L-749 Constellation was operating a scheduled flight and crashed near Tlajomulco de Zuñiga, killing all 45 occupants.

== Accident ==
The aircraft Lockheed Constellation was a four-engine (four-propeller) aircraft, registered as XA-MEV, originally built in 1951 and delivered to Air India as VT-DEO. It was sold to Lockheed Aircraft Corporation in early 1958 to be handed to a new owner. The ill-fated aircraft was owned by Aeronaves de México (now Aeroméxico) and incorporated into service in February 1958. The pilots were both experienced; the flight was headed by Captain Alfonso Ceceña Gastélum, who had around 15,000 flight hours, and First Officer Roberto Herrera had 10,000 flight hours logged. The aeroplane landed at Guadalajara around 20:00 CST and took off from Runway 28 at 21:53 CST, after completing the leg from Mazatlán to Guadalajara's old airport (which at the time was located 16km from the now-actual Miguel Hidalgo y Costilla International Airport). The expected one-hour flight plan included to follow a strict instrument-based references after taking off which had to be carried out during climbing towards México City, the flight path included to do a tear drop left turn with while holding after taking off -due to the airport location at the time- the plane expected to climb and keep a left turn, but due to the current weather and time, the plane stopped the turn. The plane halted its turn and was set to a straight direction for another two minutes -unknown at the time- the plane was flying low and was headed into an out-of-course path. The plane tried to correct the flight path process without visual references outside, the plane kept flying straight in a south-westerly direction, at 20:00 CST the flight was unknowingly headed straight towards Cerro Latillas. Contact with ATC was severed after no update was received. Another flight -Mexicana de Aviación, Douglas DC-3- was advised to maintain a holding pattern while flying around the Guadalajara metro-area due to weather complications and had to wait for landing clearance from the tower after the Constellation's takeoff. The DC-3 asked through radio to the ill-fated plane for their position and whereabouts after seeing a fireball coming from the ground. ATC asked the DC-3 to maintain their hold due to the weather getting worse. Mexicana pilots notified ATC about their holding pattern and received no answer from Flight 111 despite several attempts. Authorities and emergency services were deployed after no contact was made with ATC. Aeronaves Mexico City's terminal called Guadalajara around 2 AM stating [the] plane had been delayed several hours with no whereabouts. The constellation wreckage was found by authorities the following morning after the crash. The crash site was charred and found around the outskirts of Tlajomulco de Zúñiga. Local villagers tried to contact authorities minutes after a plane was heard flying close to the ground and crashing afterwards with no success. The aircraft carried 38 passengers and seven crew members, all of whom perished instantly.

=== Passengers ===
The passengers' list included several mostly Mexican citizens. Hours later, after the accident, it was found that several United States citizens were on board. A few of the passengers were the following:

- José Luis Arregui Zepeda, brother of civil engineer Felipe Arregui Zepeda (future builder of Estadio Jalisco) financed by the Banco de Zamora and the Compañía General de Aceptaciones de Monterrey
- Dionisio Fernández Sahagún, co-founder of the Universidad Autónoma de Guadalajara (UAG) and father of journalist José Antonio Fernández Salazar (1956 – 2018)
- American Oceanographer Townsend Cromwell (Boston, Massachusetts, 3 November 1922 – 2 June 1958)
- American Scientist Bell M. Shimada (Seattle, Washington, 17 January 1922 – 2 June 1958).

The last two were heading to Acapulco to join a Scottish Expedition studying the currents of the Pacific Ocean in connection with the International Geophysical Year 1957–1958.

At the crash site there was heavy looting by locals, and police and military were deployed hours after.

== Causes ==
The weather conditions were adverse, which included heavy rain late at night as part of the resolution given by the ICAO and federal investigators; however, the Secretariat of Infrastructure, Communications and Transportation made a parallel investigation as well. Spatial disorientation and loss of situational awareness were noted by both investigators since the flight plan had no visual references and thus the pilots decided to hold the turn instead of continuing with the tear drop course shown on the chart. One of the causes was listed as mechanical failure of the four-engine aircraft by Mexican investigators; however, no trace of mechanical failure was listed by one of the reasons given by the ICAO resolution from the accident.

== See also ==
- Pan Am Flight 816
- Air India Flight 855
- Viasa Flight 897
- Gulf Air Flight 072
- Flash Airlines Flight 604
- Adam Air Flight 574
- Sriwijaya Air Flight 182
- Spatial disorientation
- Aviation accident
