= Shimada Seamount =

Seamount in the Pacific Ocean

Shimada Seamount is a seamount in the Pacific Ocean located southwest of Baja California Sur in Mexico. It is a shallow seamount, reaching a depth of 30 metres (98 ft) below sea level and is a regular single-peaked mountain with a westerly spur and little relief otherwise. A platform lies at a depth of 180 metres (590 ft). Talus deposits surround the seamount at its base. The seafloor underneath Shimada is between 18 million and 21 million years old and lies at a depth of about 4,100 metres (13,500 ft); other than abyssal hills at a distance of up to 1 kilometre (0.62 mi) from Shimada, Shimada is isolated. Volcanic rocks taken from Shimada are considered to be icelandites.

Most seamounts form at mid-ocean ridges, but hotspots and transform faults can also produce seamounts. These mechanisms cannot really explain the origin of Shimada Seamount, however; it may be part of a hotspot trace. Evidence from core samples around the seamount, the appearance of the summit area, and the presence of thin manganese crusts imply an age of about 10,000 years for some volcanic rocks at Shimada; the rocks are too young to be dated by potassium-argon dating, and all the evidence indicates that volcanic activity at Shimada is of late Quaternary-Holocene age.

Possibly alive Lithothamnium corals have been dredged at Shimada from a depth of 110 to 130 metres (360 to 430 ft).

Shimada Seamount is named for the American fisheries scientist Bell M. Shimada (1922–1958). It has been known under a variety of names throughout its history, including Shimada Bank, Shamada Seamount, Hurricane Bank and Allaire Bank.

== See also ==
- Henderson Seamount
- Vesteris Seamount
