= Bell M. Shimada =

American fisheries scientist (1922–1958)

Dr. Bell Masayuki Shimada
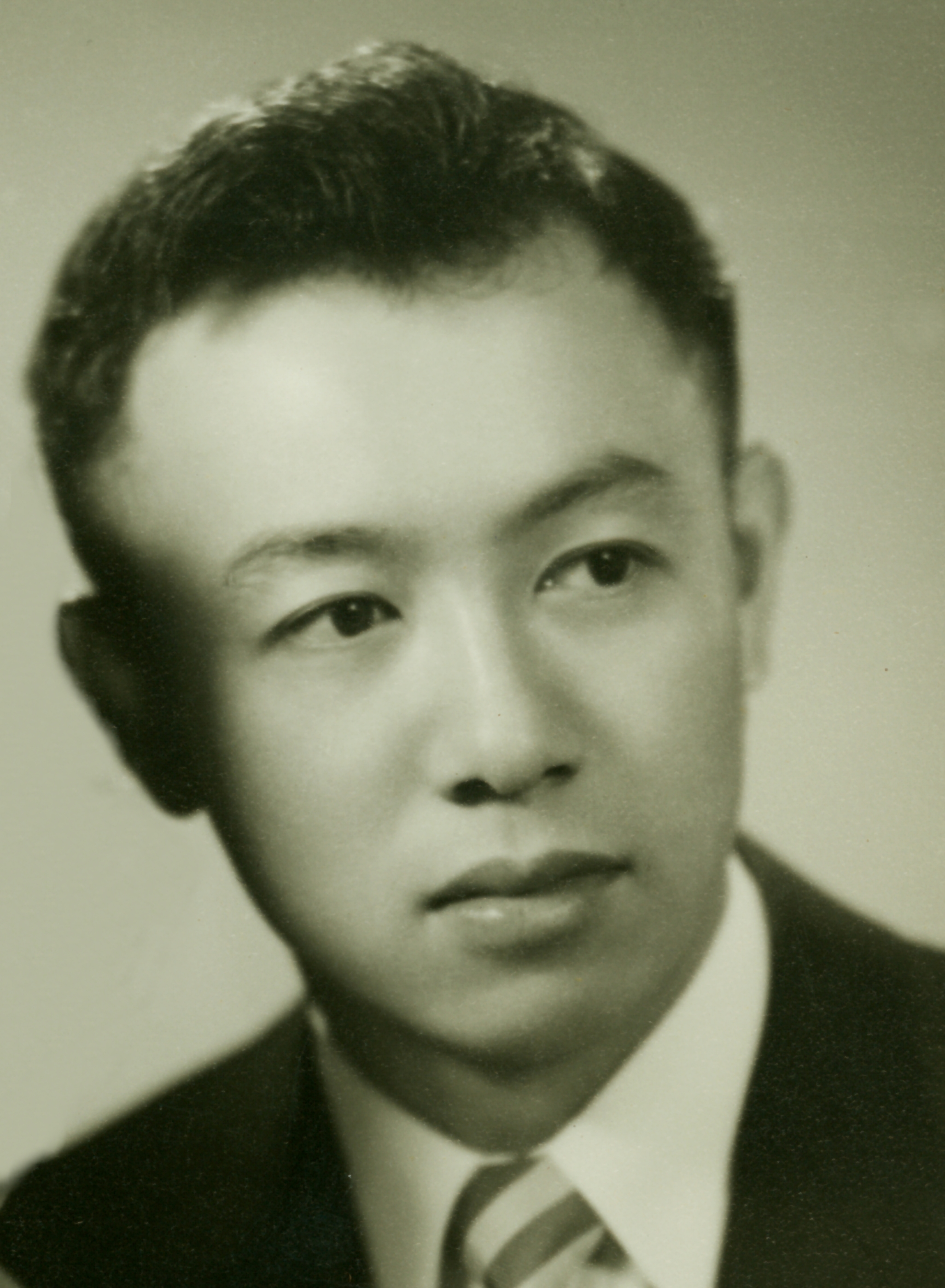
- Born: January 17, 1922; Seattle, Washington, US
- Died: June 2, 1958 (aged 36) near Guadalajara, Mexico
- Education: Bachelor's degree, University of Washington 1947; Master of Science in Fisheries, University of Washington 1948; PhD, University of Washington 1956
- Known for: Study of Pacific Ocean tuna fishery
- Spouse: Rae Shimada née Shimojima
- Children: Allen Shimada (b. 1954), Julie Shimada (b. 1957)
- Scientific career
- Fields: Fisheries science
- Workplaces: United States Fish and Wildlife Service 1948-1958; Inter-American Tropical Tuna Commission 1952-1958; Bureau of Commercial Fisheries 1956-1958

Bell Masayuki Shimada (Japanese: 島田 正雪, January 17, 1922 - June 2, 1958) was an American fisheries scientist. He is noted for his study during the 1950s of tuna stocks in the tropical Pacific Ocean and its important effect on the development of the post-World War II tuna fishery on the United States West Coast.

== Biography ==
=== Early life ===
Shimada was born in Seattle, Washington, on January 17, 1922, to Japanese immigrant parents. As a boy, he demonstrated an aptitude for mathematics and science. After graduating from Franklin High School, he attended the University of Washington, where he studied at the School of Fisheries.

The United States entered World War II with the Japanese attack on Pearl Harbor in December 1941. Early in the war, concerns arose in the United States that Japanese-Americans might sympathize with Japan, leading to a program of internment of Japanese-Americans which involved "evacuating" them involuntarily from the United States West Coast and incarcerating them in inland concentration camps. This interrupted Shimada's studies when he was "evacuated" on April 27, 1942. He was incarcerated at Minidoka in Idaho on April 29, 1942.

=== Military service ===
In May 1943, Shimada was permitted to leave the camp and enlist in the United States Army as an infantryman in the 442nd Regimental Combat Team. After basic training at Camp Shelby in Hattiesburg, Mississippi, he was selected for Japanese language and military intelligence collection training at Camp Savage in Savage, Minnesota. In April 1944, he was transferred to the United States Army Air Forces and received three months of air intelligence training in Orlando, Florida. He then was transferred to Honolulu, Hawaii, where he served as a translator and interpreter until May 1945, when he was transferred to Guam, where he served as a radio traffic monitor until the surrender of Japan on August 15, 1945.

In August 1945, Shimada moved to U.S. Army Air Forces headquarters in Tokyo to take part in the occupation of Japan. He collected and synthesized economic and infrastructure data on the effects of the strategic bombing of Japan until he was discharged from the military in February 1946.

=== Fisheries science career ===
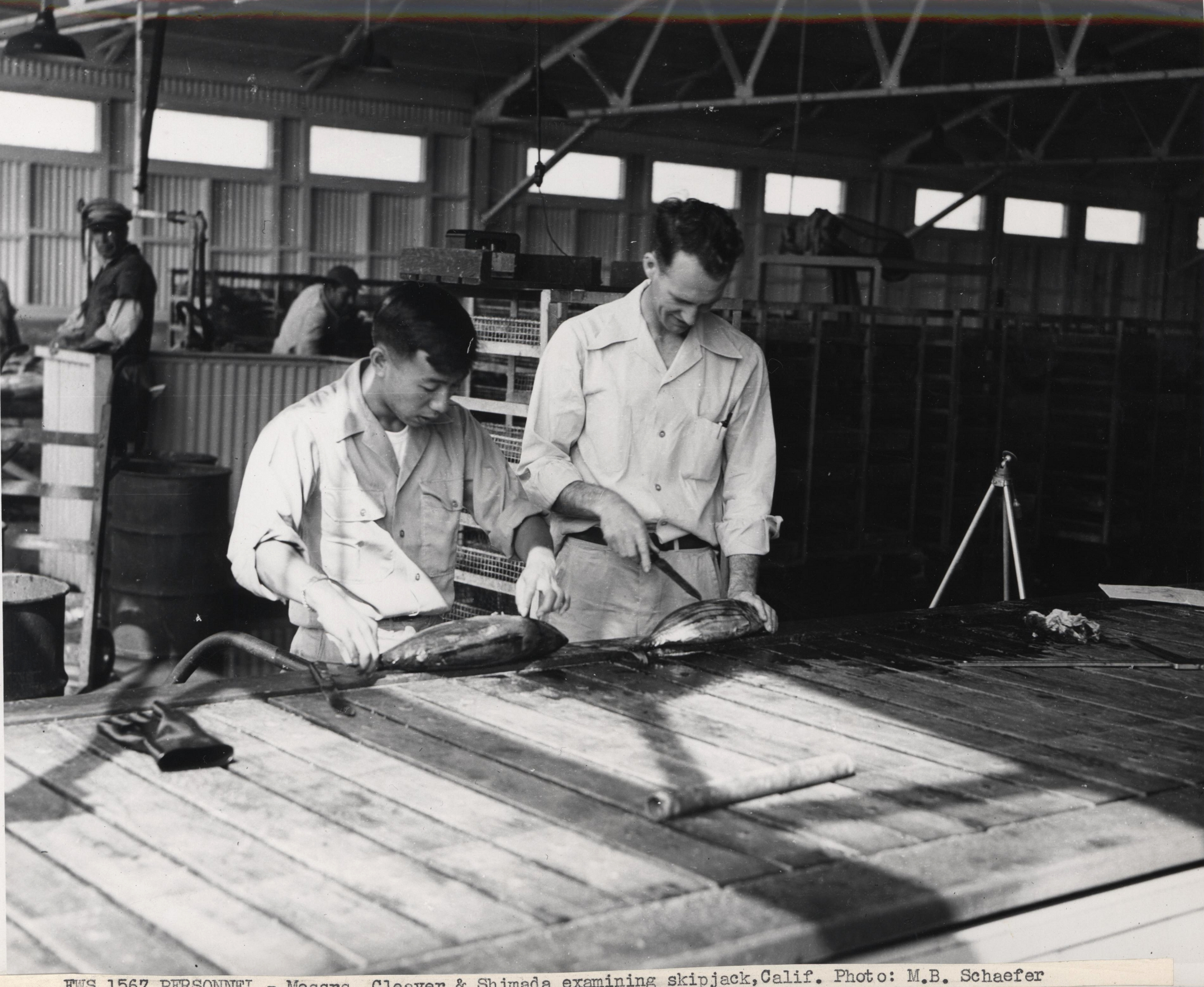
Bell M. Shimada (left) and Fred Cleaver examining skipjack tuna, circa 1951

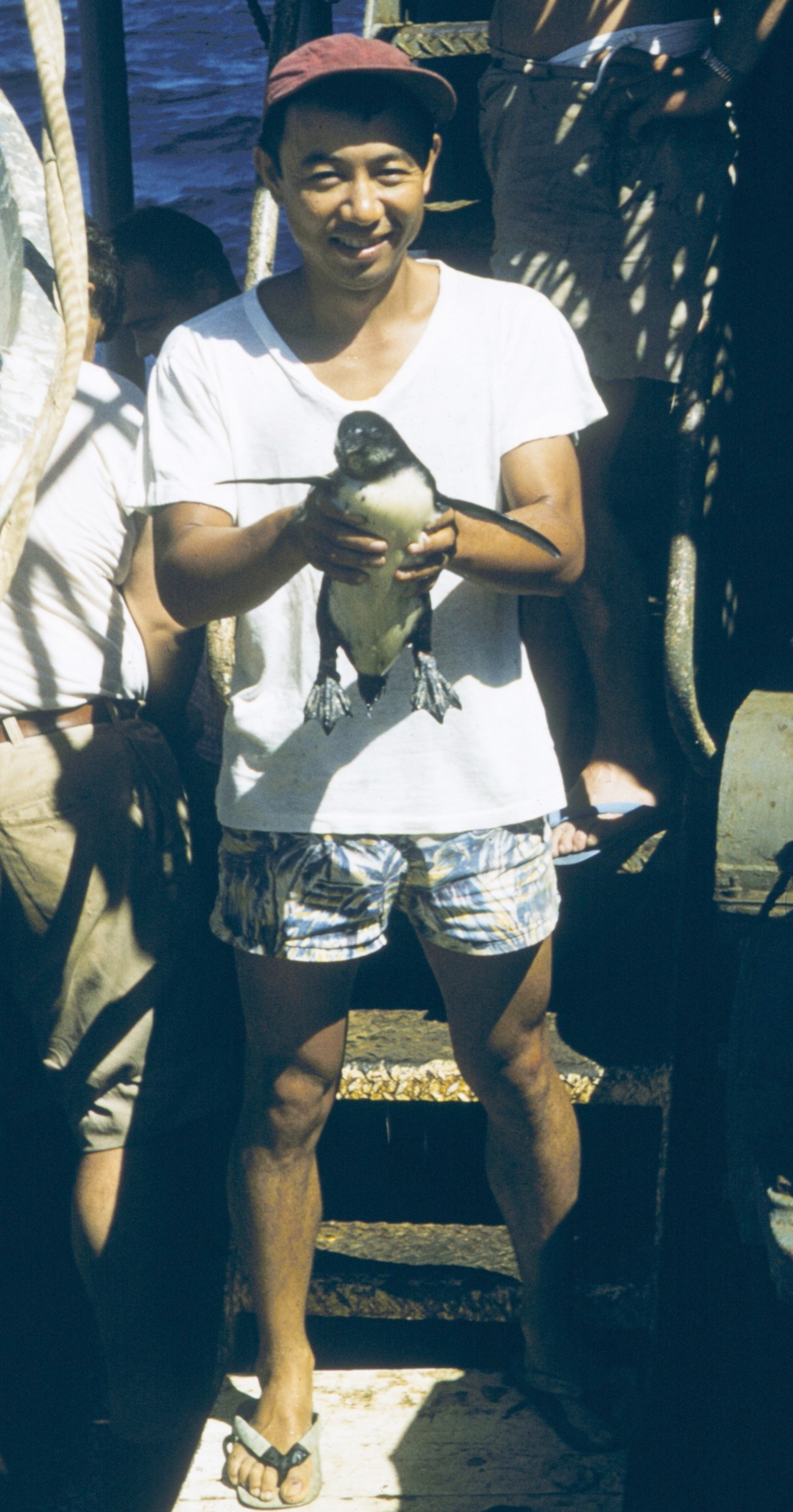
Bell M. Shimada, circa 1957

==== Research for Supreme Commander for the Allied Forces ====
Remaining in Japan, Shimada accepted a civilian position as a fisheries biologist in the Natural Resources Section on the staff of the Supreme Commander for the Allied Powers (SCAP). His duties involved researching and analyzing Japanese fisheries activities and compiling and collating data on them. He played a major role in drafting SCAP directives to the Japanese government, particularly on whaling, and his first professional publication, Japanese Whaling in the Bonin Islands Area (United States Fish and Wildlife Service, Fishery Leaflet No. 248), published in 1947, was based on his studies and reports on whaling while he was in Japan.

Leaving Japan in December 1946, Shimada returned to the University of Washington to resume his studies at the College of Fisheries. He also worked as a laboratory technician for the School of Fisheries and maintained the School's ichthyology collection. After graduating cum laude on December 20, 1947, and receiving his bachelor's degree, he remained at the School of Fisheries to pursue postgraduate studies, during which he worked as a laboratory assistant maintaining aquaculture facilities for the Atomic Energy Commission. In September 1948, he began his career with the U.S. Fish and Wildlife Service, accepting a position in its Bureau of Fisheries.

==== Pacific Ocean Fisheries Investigations ====
Shimada graduated from the University of Washington School of Fisheries postgraduate program with a Master of Science in Fisheries in December 1948, and the same month moved to Honolulu to work for the Fish and Wildlife Service's new Pacific Ocean Fishery Investigations (POFI) office. Tuna stocks in the Pacific Ocean had come under increasing pressure since the end of World War II, and the Fish and Wildlife Service had created POFI to study the tuna fishery in the equatorial Pacific. POFI's first director, the influential fisheries scientist Oscar Elton Sette, arrived in Honolulu to take charge of POFI in 1949. Sette has been credited with pioneering modern fisheries science by integrating the biological study of fish and their life cycles and populations with oceanography and meteorology to develop an overall understanding not only of the biology of the fish themselves but also of the influence of the physical environment on fisheries and fluctuations in their abundance from year to year. Sette organized and directed POFI according to this vision.

Under Sette's guidance, Shimada worked with many accomplished fisheries scientists and oceanographers while at POFI, including Wilbert McLeod "Wib" Chapman, Roger Revelle, Milner Baily "Benny" Schaefer, and Sette himself, as well as young scientists who would become notable in their fields as their careers progressed, such as Townsend Cromwell, Fred Cleaver, Warren Wooster, Alan Tubbs, William Aron, Gerald Howard, Richard Hennemuth, Howard Yoshida, and Tom Hida. The Fish and Wildlife Service assigned two research ships to support POFI, and Shimada served as a seagoing biologist, in charge of shipboard science watches and research.

Shimada also took postgraduate courses while in Honolulu and began work on his Ph.D. He left POFI in January 1951 and spent the rest of the year in Seattle taking doctoral courses at the School of Fisheries at the University of Washington.

==== Inter-American Tropical Tuna Commission ====
In February 1952, Shimada was assigned to the Inter-American Tropical Tuna Commission (IATTC), which was collocated with the Scripps Institution of Oceanography and the Fish and Wildlife Service Bureau of Fisheries laboratory in La Jolla, California, and he cooperated professionally with those institutions on matters of mutual interest, sharing scientific ideas and manpower and cooperating in research. Working with Milner "Benny" Schaefer and Gerald Howard, Shimada conducted the tuna fishery research for which he is best known during his time with the IATTC and achieved national and international recognition when he began to publish his research on tuna spawning, distribution, and feeding patterns. He received his doctorate from the University of Washington School of Fisheries in 1956, and rose rapidly within the IATTC, serving as the IATTC's Senior Scientist from 1956 to 1958. Both at POFI and at IATTC, Shimada worked frequently with Townsend Cromwell, a physical oceanographer interested in ocean currents, on research into the distribution of tuna in the Pacific Ocean. Their cooperative work, following the principles of fisheries oceanography Sette, Shimada, Cromwell, and other members of Sette's team had pioneered at POFI, combined Cromwell's insights into the forces such as temperature gradients that drive currents with Shimada's findings regarding the availability of forage for the tunas, leading to useful research results for both men.

In 1957, Shimada and Cromwell worked together on the distribution of tuna throughout the Pacific Ocean, including a research ship cruise off Mexico's Clarion Island as part of a project for the IATTC known as the Island Current Study. Plans called for Shimada and Cromwell to make one more cruise to Clarion Island in 1958 aboard the Scripps Institution research ship Horizon to continue their research there before Shimada left the IATTC to take up a position as the first director of the Fish and Wildlife Service Bureau of Commercial Fisheries' new Eastern Pacific Tuna Investigations office in July 1958.

=== Death ===
Making their way to Acapulco, Mexico, to join their research team for the 1958 Clarion Island cruise, Shimada and Cromwell boarded Aeronaves de México Aeronaves de México Flight 111, a Lockheed L-749A Constellation, in Guadalajara, Mexico, on June 2, 1958, for a flight to Mexico City. Shortly after takeoff, the airliner crashed into La Latilla Mountain, only 16 kilometers (10 miles) from Guadalajara Airport, killing all 45 people on board in what at the time was Mexico's deadliest aviation accident.

== Personal life ==
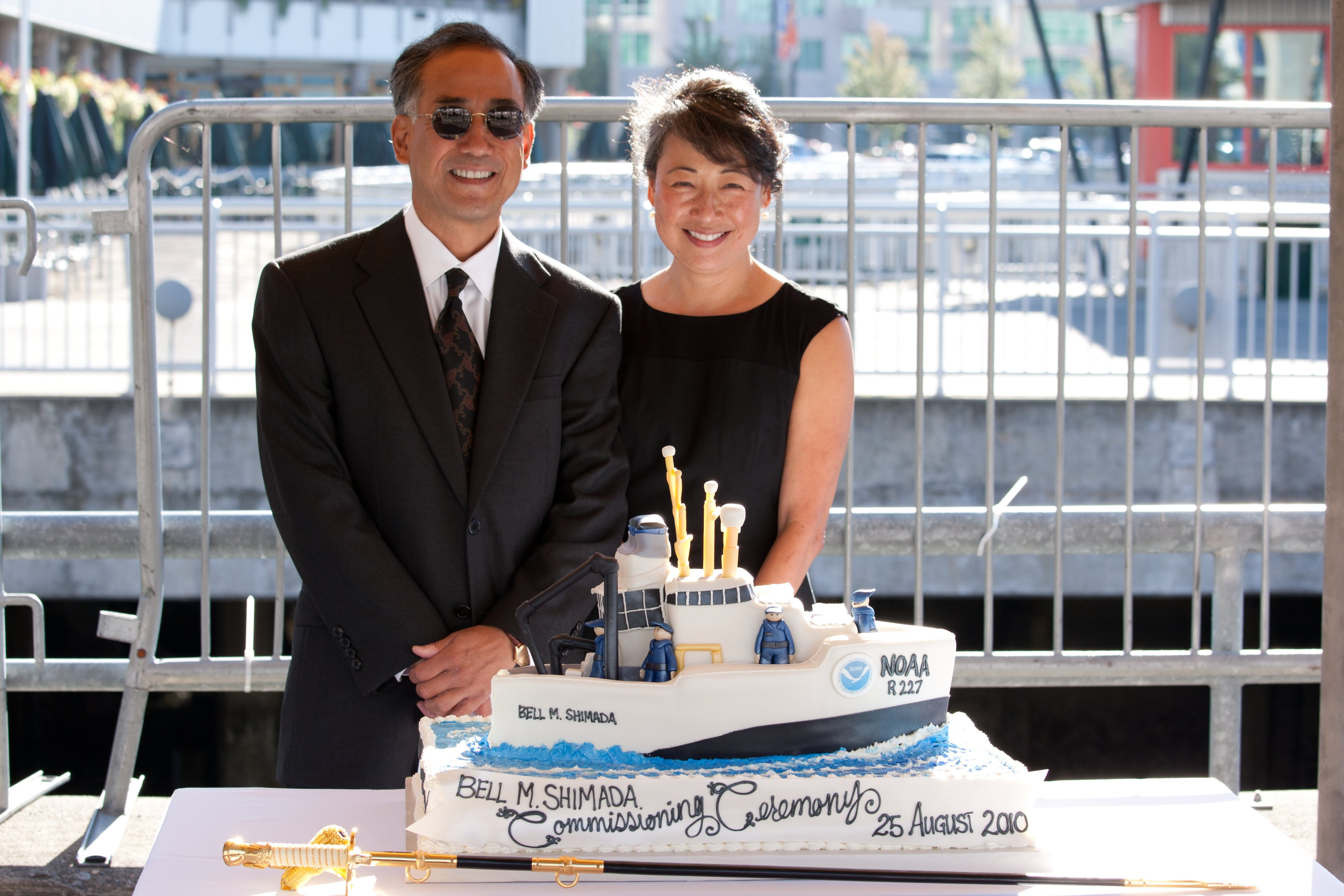
Allen and Julie Shimada, at the commissioning ceremony for the ship named for their father, NOAAS Bell M. Shimada (R 227), in 2010.

While working with POFI in Hawaii between 1948 and 1952, Shimada met and married the former Rae M. Shimojima, who was working as Sette's secretary at the time. They had a son, Allen, born in 1954, and a daughter, Julie, born in 1957. Allen Shimada later became a fisheries scientist with the National Oceanic and Atmospheric Administration's National Marine Fisheries Service.

== Commemoration ==
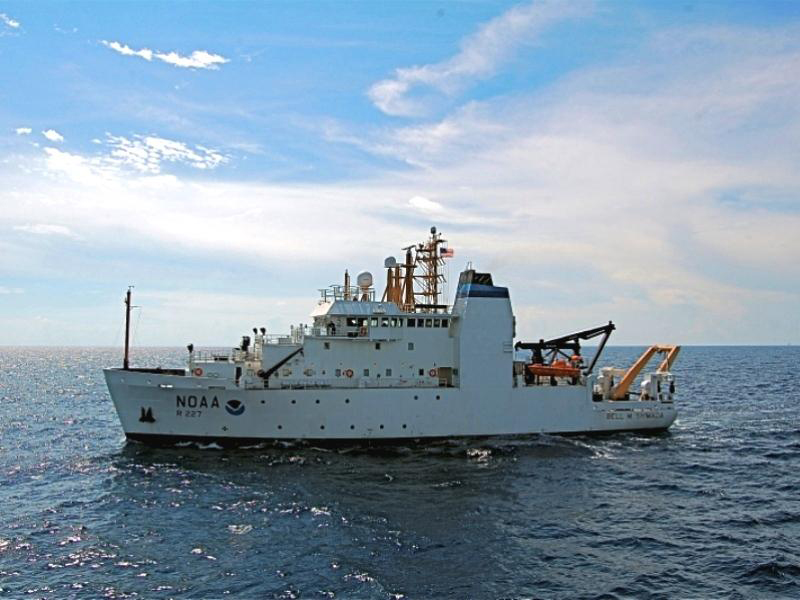
NOAAS Bell M. Shimada (R 227)

Although Shimada died at the age of 36 and his fisheries science career lasted only 12 years, at the time of his death the fisheries science community already viewed his contributions as so significant to both the scientific understanding of the Pacific tuna fishery and to the post-World War II development of that fishery on the U.S. West Coast that the Proceedings from the Symposium on "The Changing Pacific Ocean in 1957 and 1958" were dedicated to him, as well as to Townsend Cromwell. The dedication read:

This Symposium is dedicated to Townsend Cromwell and Bell M. Shimada, associates in research of many of the participants in this Symposium, who lost their lives, June 2, 1958, in an airplane crash near Guadalajara, Mexico, while en route to join the research vessel Horizon to make further observations on the changing conditions in 1958."

The Shimada Seamount in the Pacific Ocean southwest of Baja California at 16°52′N 117°31′W is named for Shimada.

The National Oceanic and Atmospheric Administration research ship NOAAS Bell M. Shimada (R 227) is named in honor of Shimada. A team of students from Marina High School in Marina, California, that suggested the name won a regional NOAA contest to name the vessel. In a speech at the ship's launching ceremony on September 26, 2008, Shimada's daughter Julie said, "I hope the Bell M. Shimada is a lasting testament that no life is too short, no career too brief, no contribution too small, to make a difference." The ship was commissioned into the NOAA fleet on August 25, 2010.
