= Fred Cleaver =

English footballer

Personal information
- Full name: Frederick Louis Cleaver
- Date of birth: 22 April 1885
- Place of birth: Ashbourne, England
- Date of death: 1968 (aged 82–83)
- Position: Centre forward

Senior career*
Years	Team	Apps	(Gls)
1905	Ashbourne Town		
1905–1907	Derby County	11	(3)
1907–1908	Preston North End	0	(0)
1908–1909	Watford		
1909–1910	Redditch Town		
1910	Atherstone Town		
1911	Washford Mills		
Total		11	(3)
- * Club domestic league appearances and goals

Frederick Louis Cleaver (22 April 1885–1968) was an English footballer who played in the Football League for Derby County.
