= NOAAS Bell M. Shimada =

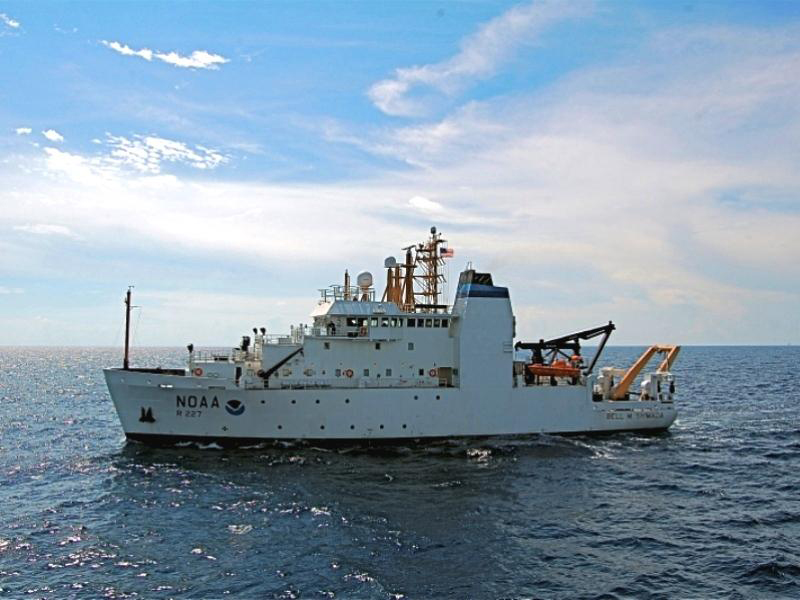
- NOAAS Bell M. Shimada underway on 22 September 2009.

History

United States
- Name: NOAAS Bell M. Shimada (R 227)
- Namesake: Bell M. Shimada (1922-1958), American fisheries scientist
- Operator: National Oceanic and Atmospheric Administration (NOAA)
- Builder: Halter Marine, Inc., Moss Point, Mississippi
- Laid down: 15 June 2007
- Launched: 26 September 2008
- Acquired: 21 January 2010 (delivered)
- Commissioned: 25 August 2010
- Home port: Newport, Oregon
- Identification: Call letters: WTED; IMO number: 9349069; MMSI number: 369970147
- Status: Active in NOAA Pacific Fleet

General characteristics
- Class & type: Oscar Dyson-class fisheries research ship
- Displacement: 1,840 metric tons (light ship); 2,479 metric tons (full load)
- Length: 208.6 ft (63.6 m)
- Beam: 49.2 ft (15.0 m)
- Draft: 19.4 ft (5.9 m) (with centerboard up); 29.7 ft (9.1 m) (with centerboard down)
- Propulsion: TECO Westinghouse diesel-electric
- Speed: 14.0 knots (26 km/h) (maximum); 11 knots (20 km/h) (cruising)
- Range: 12,000 nautical miles (22,000 km)
- Endurance: 40 days
- Boats & landing craft carried: 1 x 26 ft 6 in (8.08 m) rescue boat
- Complement: 24 (5 NOAA Corps officers, 4 licensed engineers, and 15 other crew members), plus up to 15 scientists

NOAAS Bell M. Shimada (R 227) is an American fisheries research ship in commission with the National Oceanic and Atmospheric Administration (NOAA) since 2010. She operates along the United States West Coast.

The ship was named by students at Marina High School in Marina, California, who won a NOAA vessel-naming contest held as part of an educational outreach program. The ship's namesake, Bell M. Shimada (1922-1958), served with the United States Fish and Wildlife Service and the Inter-American Tropical Tuna Commission, and was known for his studies of tropical Pacific tuna stocks.

== Construction and commissioning ==
Bell M. Shimada was laid down by Halter Marine, Inc., at Moss Point, Mississippi, on 15 June 2007 and launched on 26 September 2008. On 21 January 2010, Halter Marine delivered her to NOAA, which commissioned her on 25 August 2010.

== Characteristics and capabilities ==
Capable of conducting multidisciplinary oceanographic operations in support of biological, chemical, and physical process studies, Bell M. Shimada was commissioned as the fourth of a class of five of the most advanced fisheries research vessels in the world, with a unique capability to conduct both fishing and oceanographic research. She is a stern trawler with fishing capabilities similar to those of commercial fishing vessels. She is rigged for longlining and trap fishing and can conduct trawling operations to depths of 3,500 meters (11,500 feet). Her most advanced feature is the incorporation of United States Navy-type acoustic quieting technology to enable NOAA scientists to monitor fish populations without the ship's noise altering the behavior of the fish, including advanced quieting features incorporated into her machinery, equipment, and propeller. Her oceanographic hydrophones are mounted on a retractable centerboard, or drop keel, that lowers scientific transducers away from the region of hull-generated flow noise, enhancing the quality of the data collected. To take full advantage of these advanced data-gathering capabilities, she has the Scientific Sonar System, which can accurately measure the biomass of fish in a survey area. She also has an Acoustic Doppler Current Profiler with which to collect data on ocean currents and a multibeam sonar system that provides information on the content of the water column and on the type and topography of the seafloor while she is underway, and she can gather hydrographic data at any speed up to 11 knots (20 km/h).

Bell M. Shimada has an oceanographic winch with a maximum pull weight of 6,800 pounds (3,100 kg) which can deploy up to 5,100 meters (16,700 feet) of 16-mm wire. She also has two hydrographic winches with a maximum pull weight of 2,600 pounds (1,200 kg), each of which can deploy 3,600 meters (11,800 feet) of 9.5-mm wire, two trawl winches with a maximum pull weight of 7,200 pounds (3,300 kg), each of which can deploy 4,300 meters (14,100 feet) of 28.6-mm wire, and a hydraulic third-wire winch which can deploy 4,700 meters (15,400 feet) of 11.4-mm electromechanical cable. She has a 67-foot (20-meter) knuckle boom and a 60-foot (18-meter) telescopic boom. She has a movable A-frame on her starboard side with a maximum safe working load of 2,979 pounds (1,351 kg) and a large movable A-frame aft with a maximum safe working load of 22,000 pounds (10,000 kg) that serves as a stern gantry. The oceanographic winch and large after A-frame work in conjunction to serve her stern sampling station, while two winches work with the starboard-side A-frame to service her side sampling station, and Bell M. Shimada's configuration allows her to have three scientific packages ready for sequential operations. One of her winches also can deploy lines and equipment over her stern. In addition to trawling, her sampling stations can deploy smaller sampling nets, longlines, and fish traps. Her winches can deploy CTD instruments to measure the electrical conductivity, temperature, and chlorophyll fluorescence of sea water. Bell M. Shimada also can deploy specialized gear such as Multiple Opening/Closing Net and Environmental Sensing System (MOCNESS) frames, towed vehicles, dredges, and bottom corers, and she can deploy and recover both floating and bottom-moored sensor arrays. While trawling, Bell M. Shimada uses wireless and hard-wired systems to monitor the shape of the trawl net and to work in conjunction with an autotrawl system that sets trawl depth and trawl wire tension and adjusts the net configuration.

Bell M. Shimada has a 591-square-foot (sq. ft.) (54.9-square-meter) (m^{2}) wet laboratory, a 206-sq.-ft. (19.1-m^{2}) dry laboratory, a 270-sq.-ft. (25.1-m^{2}) chemistry laboratory, a 474-sq.-ft. (44.0-m^{2}) electronics and computer laboratory, and a 179-sq.-ft. (16.6-m^{2}) hydrographic laboratory. She also has a 61-sq.-ft. (5.7-m^{2}) climate-controlled space, a 402-sq.-ft. (37.3-m^{2}) walk-in scientific freezer, a 9-sq.-ft. (0.8-m^{2}) scientific chest freezer, a 55-sq.-ft. (5.1-m^{2}) scientific refrigerator, and a 65-sq.-ft. (6.0-m^{2}) store room. She has open deck space aft for fishing and scientific operations and another area of open deck space at the side sampling station on her starboard side. All of her discharge pipes empty off her port side so that fluids discharged will not contaminate samples collected at the station on her starboard side.

Bell M. Shimada carries a 26-foot 6-inch (8.1-meter) SOLAS-approved rescue boat with a 144-horsepower (122-kilowatt) motor and a capacity of six people.

In addition to her crew of 24, Bell M. Shimada can accommodate up to 15 scientists.

== Service history ==
Officially classified as a "fisheries survey vessel" and with her home port at Newport, Oregon, Bell M. Shimada operates in support of the Northwest Fisheries Science Center in Seattle, Washington, and the Southwest Fisheries Science Center in La Jolla, California, both components of NOAA's National Marine Fisheries Service. She operates along the entire United States West Coast, conducting both oceanographic and fisheries research. She monitors fisheries and protected species including albacore, sharks, salmon, groundfish, sardines, and hake, makes weather observations, conducts habitat assessments, and surveys marine mammal and marine bird populations.

When NOAA commissioned the fisheries survey vessel NOAAS Reuben Lasker (R 228) – home-ported at San Diego, California – in May 2014 and assigned her to surveys of fish, marine mammals, and sea turtles off the U.S. West Coast and in the eastern tropical Pacific Ocean, Bell M. Shimada was freed to focus on high-priority projects that prior to Reuben Lasker's arrival had been allocated no dedicated sea time, including studies of the California Current Large Marine Ecosystem between British Columbia and Baja California and of salmon populations all along the U.S. West Coast.

On 18 June 2025, NOAA announced that it had awarded a contract for modernization and repairs of the research ship NOAAS Oscar Dyson (R 224), which operated in the waters of Alaska. NOAA expected the work to take about a year, planning for it to begin after Oscar Dyson completed the 2026 field season and expecting her to return to service in time for the 2028 field season. To allow its research activities in Alaska to continue seamlessly in the meantime, NOAA planned to outfit Bell M. Shimada for Arctic service with polar life rafts, rescue boat heaters, and other adaptations and deploy her to Alaskan waters while Oscar Dyson was in the shipyard.

== Notes ==
This article incorporates public domain material from websites or documents of the National Oceanic and Atmospheric Administration.
