= Pan Am Flight 121 =

1947 aircraft accident in Syria

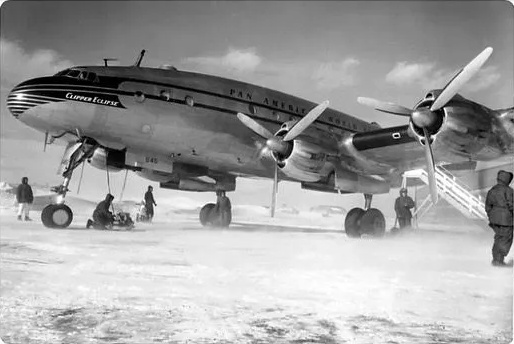
- NC88845, the aircraft involved in the accident

Accident
- Date: 19 June 1947
- Summary: Engine failure leading to in-flight fire
- Site: Syrian Desert, 4 miles (6.4 km) from Mayadin, Syria; 35.028°N 40.386°E

Aircraft
- Aircraft type: Lockheed L-049 Constellation
- Aircraft name: Clipper Eclipse
- Operator: Pan American World Airways
- Call sign: CLIPPER 121
- Registration: NC88845
- Flight origin: Karachi Civil Airport, Karachi, British Raj
- Destination: Istanbul, Turkey
- Occupants: 36
- Passengers: 26
- Crew: 10
- Fatalities: 15
- Injuries: 21
- Survivors: 21

Pan Am Flight 121 was a scheduled Pan American World Airways flight from Karachi to Istanbul. On the evening of 18 June 1947, the Lockheed L-049 Constellation serving the flight, known as the Clipper Eclipse (previously Clipper Dublin), suffered an engine failure. This led to the overheating of the remaining engines until one caught fire, which spread to the aircraft. The heat from burning magnesium parts separated the engine from the aircraft, leaving it unable to maintain altitude. Early in the morning of 19 June 1947 the plane crashed in the Syrian desert 4 miles (6.4 km) from the town of Mayadin. Fifteen people were killed, including 7 crew and 8 passengers. The three surviving crew members were third officer Gene Roddenberry (who went on to create the original Star Trek television series), the chief purser, and one flight attendant. After rescuing passengers from the burning wreckage, Roddenberry took control as the ranking flight officer and organized scout parties to find aid. By midday, the Syrian Army took the survivors to the hospital at Deir ez-Zor. The majority returned to the United States quickly while Roddenberry remained in Syria for two weeks to answer questions about the crash from the local government.

== Flight history ==
Prior to the fatal flight, the Lockheed L-049 Constellation known as the Clipper Eclipse had suffered engine problems during a flight earlier that week. This had required it to turn back near Gander, Newfoundland on the outbound leg of the journey, and delayed it for two days. A cylinder was replaced in the number 2 engine, as a failure in the top piston ring was found. A further problem was found in that engine later in the week while in Rome. Captain Joseph Hart Jr., 42, and chief purser Anthony Volpe were walking under the wing when Volpe spotted what he thought was oil dripping from the engine. It turned out to be hydraulic fluid and required a replacement pump to be installed.

Captain Hart's flight crew included first officer Robert McCoy, 25, from Maugansville, Maryland, and third officer Gene Roddenberry, 25, of River Edge, New Jersey. Roddenberry had no role on the plane to perform, as he was "deadheading" – riding as a passenger on the flight without any set duties – although that changed during the flight. There were a total of 36 passengers and crew on the plane.

The plane departed Karachi at 3:37 pm on a flight to Istanbul. This was the first leg on the return journey to New York. The flight was expected to take ten and a half hours, and fly at a cruising altitude of 18,500 feet (5,600 m). Five hours into the flight, Roddenberry took over from Hart at the yoke to give the Captain a break. While Hart was out of the cockpit, the number one engine developed a fault with an exhaust rocker arm, and so Roddenberry shut the engine down.

Hart returned to the cockpit and evaluated the situation. Knowing that the plane could fly on three engines, and that the local airstrips would not be able to make immediate repairs, he decided to continue on to Istanbul. The remaining engines, however, could not take the increased load and began to overheat. Hart descended the plane in an attempt to cool them, also reducing the power in order to keep them going. At 10 pm, he ordered radioman Nelson Miles to advise local fields of their position, which was recorded as being at 14,000 feet (4,300 m), and 50 miles (80 km) east of Baghdad, Iraq. The Royal Air Force field at Habbaniya suggested that the Eclipse should land there, but Hart was worried once again about repair facilities and decided to press on. A cockpit alarm activated at around 11:30 pm, indicating that the number 2 engine had caught fire.

Fire suppressant measures failed to extinguish the fire, and the engine quickly became so hot that the magnesium components began to burn. Hart sent Roddenberry back to the passenger compartment to ready them for a crash landing, knowing that the engine would quickly fall from the plane. Hart wanted to take the plane to the airstrip at Deir ez-Zor, Syria, but it became apparent that he did not have sufficient time to make it there. So he began to take the plane down, and ordered Miles to radio a distress message. Roddenberry reassured the passengers that everything was under control. He ordered the flight attendant to stay in her seat while he and Volpe reiterated the crash procedures to the passengers. The chief purser sat next to the flight attendant near the front of the plane, while Roddenberry sat three rows from the rear.

The fire spread to the wing and shortly afterwards, the engine separated from the plane. This ruptured the gasoline lines, feeding the fire. As the plane was descending, a passenger screamed loudly and Roddenberry moved to comfort her; seconds later the plane struck the ground. Roddenberry suffered two broken ribs, not having been strapped down. The aircraft crashed near Mayadin and the Euphrates river at around 3:30 am local time.

The pilot's attempt to bring the plane down safely in the desert was later praised by one of the surviving passengers. A passenger said that the landing would have been successful had an engine on the port wing not dug into the ground, dragging the plane in that direction in a ground loop and breaking it in two. There were 15 people killed in the crash, 8 passengers and 7 crew members. The impact killed the crew in the cockpit, and ripped the sides of the fuselage away from the plane. This enabled some of the passengers to jump directly from the burning plane to the ground.

Roddenberry plus the surviving crew members began evacuating the injured from the burning plane. Injured passengers were handed over to the uninjured passengers who took them further away. A passenger's seatbelt would not release until Roddenberry forced it open and helped her to safety. He continued to help passengers, and attempted to extinguish fires with a pillow as they spread through the passenger cabin. Soon the fire had spread so much that further trips couldn't be made into the aircraft for survivors. "The last passenger Roddenberry pulled out died in his arms."

=== Search and recovery ===
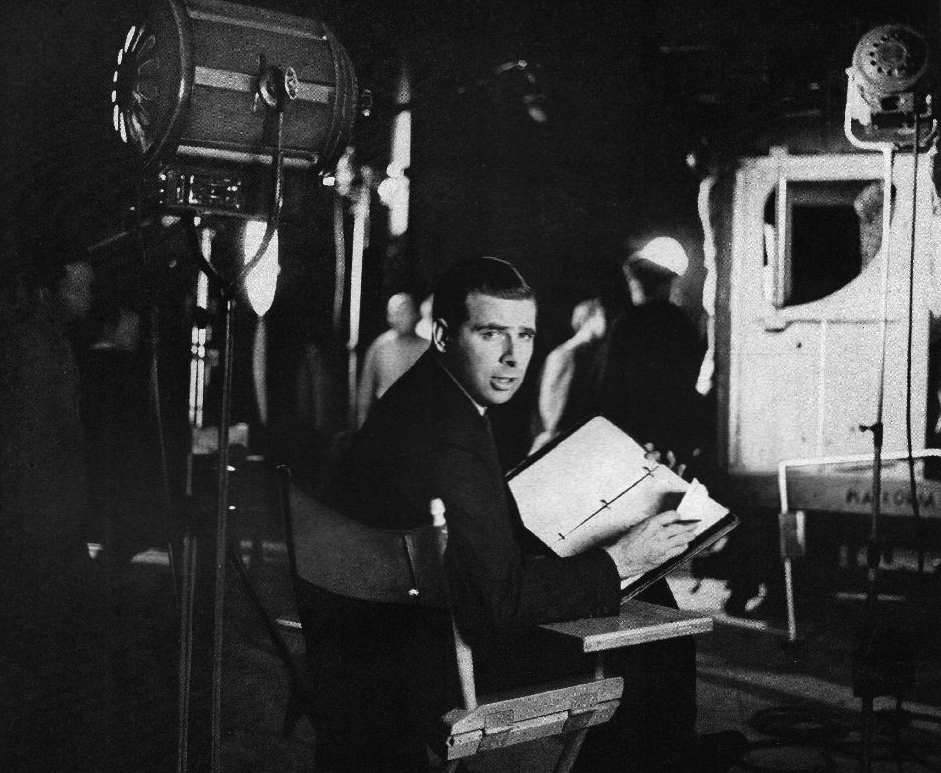
Gene Roddenberry (photographed in 1961) was the ranking flight officer following the crash.

Equipment was gathered from the burning wreckage, including several first aid kits, a number of the passengers' coats and an inflatable life raft. As the only surviving flight officer, Roddenberry took command of the situation, but did so without knowing if the plane's position had been radioed to authorities. First aid was conducted, and after sunrise, the raft was inflated and propped up to provide shade and shelter. Shortly afterwards, a number of desert tribesmen approached the survivors. Roddenberry approached them, and later stated he had influenced them to the extent that they only robbed the dead and spared the survivors.

Spotting telegraph lines in the distance, Roddenberry sent two teams of two men each to follow the wires in both directions and report their findings. After they departed, local townsmen arrived at the crash site. They too stole from the wreckage, and also from the survivors, and after a short while, only their clothing remained. A team reported back that they had found the town of Mayadin, and Roddenberry made the 4 miles (6.4 km) desert trek into the town, where he found a telephone and reported in to the airstrip at Deir ez-Zor at around 8 am. Syrian Army planes and ground troops were dispatched to recover the survivors. The first public reports of the crash came from a message sent to Pan Am's office in Damascus, detailing who the surviving crew members were. Initial reports had confused the Clipper Eclipse with the Clipper America, which at the time was conducting Pan Am's inaugural around-the-world flight.

By midday, the survivors had been transported by the Syrian Army to the Presbyterian mission hospital at Deir ez-Zor. The most seriously injured of them were transported by plane to Beirut. Roddenberry and the uninjured passengers were flown to Damascus. Several survivors of the Eclipse arrived in the United States on June 23, at La Guardia Airport, New York City. Roddenberry was delayed in Syria, as the government wanted him to aid their investigation into the crash. Following two weeks of questioning, he departed for the United States.

Later in July, surviving crew were questioned at the Civil Aeronautics Board at the Lexington Hotel in New York City. Robert W. Crisp, who was presiding over the investigation, entered into the record a commendation for all three. The purser and flight attendant received further commendations from the Transport Workers Union of America, and one from Roddenberry who wrote of their heroism to the Pan Am flight service department. In February 1948, the official report placed the blame for the crash on Pan Am for failing to replace the number two engine entirely when it developed repeated failures. Roddenberry resigned from Pan-Am following another flight incident; after that, he became a police officer with the LAPD before becoming a television writer and producer, ultimately creating the Star Trek franchise.

== See also ==
- List of accidents and incidents involving the Lockheed Constellation
