= Townsend Cromwell =

American oceanographer

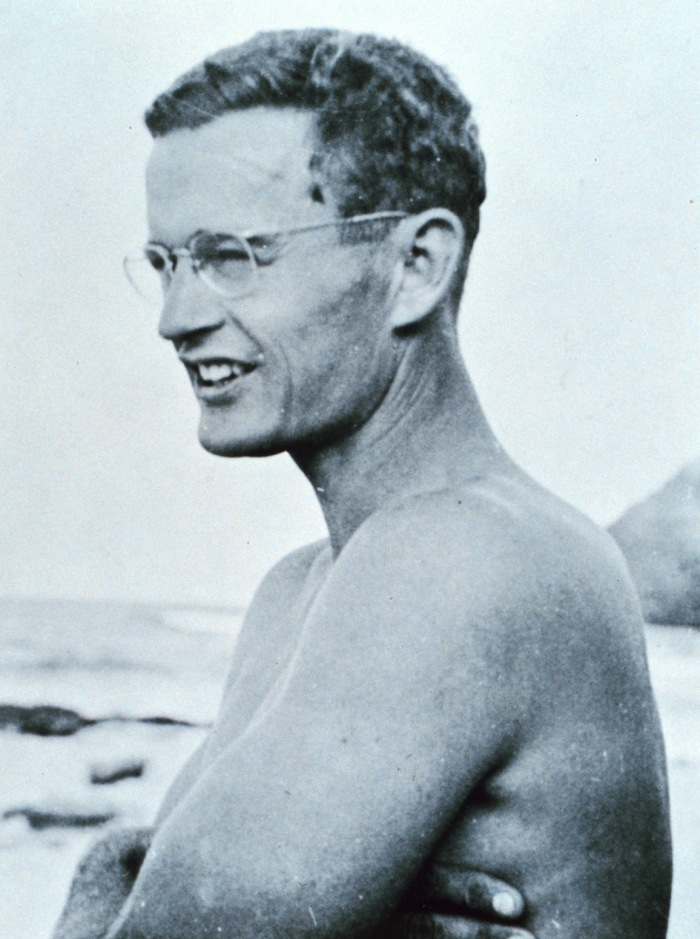
Townsend Cromwell

Townsend Cromwell (November 3, 1922 – June 2, 1958) was an oceanographer who discovered the Cromwell current while researching drifting in the equatorial region of the Pacific Ocean. He died in an airplane crash, that of Aeroméxico Flight 111 on 2 June 1958, which killed all 39 passengers and seven crew on board. The accident, also fatal to the American fisheries research biologist Bell M. Shimada, occurred near Guadalajara, Mexico, as the men were en route to join the Scot Expedition at Acapulco. Cromwell was Senior Scientist with the Inter-American Tropical Tuna Commission and Research Associate at Scripps Institution of Oceanography, La Jolla, California. His field of work was the physical environment and its relation to fisheries. He became a weather officer in the United States Army Air Forces during World War II. After receiving a B.A. degree from University of California (Los Angeles) in 1947, he returned to La Jolla, his boyhood home, as a student at Scripps, receiving an M.S. degree in oceanography from the University of California (La Jolla) in 1949. At Scripps he was strongly influenced by the oceanographer H. U. Sverdrup.

From 1949 to 1953, he was Oceanographer at Pacific Oceanic Fishery Investigations, Honolulu, Oscar Elton Sette, then Director, and Cromwell initiated a far-sighted and intensive survey of the physical and biological characteristics of Pacific equatorial waters, which had been the subject of much speculation but little observation. For many months he participated in the field work from the fisheries research ship US FWS Hugh M. Smith, and for more and harder months he carried out the analysis of the observations. As a result of this pioneering work, the knowledge of the physical and biological structure of the equatorial Pacific Ocean has been vastly advanced. These achievements are the more remarkable when one notes that comparable surveys of the equatorial Atlantic and Indian oceans are still lacking.

Cromwell confirmed the existence of upwelling at the equator, disproved the existence of upwelling at the northern edge of the Equatorial Countercurrent, and originated a reasonable model of wind-induced current transport in the equatorial zone During these studies he recognized the significance of the unexpected drift of long-line fishing gear at the equator, and in 1952 he led a Hugh M. Smith cruise using drogues in current measurements. Thus, he was responsible for the discovery of the Equatorial Undercurrent the fourth member of the equatorial current system (the North Equatorial Current, Equatorial Countercurrent, and South Equatorial Current having been known for a century).

The existence of the Equatorial Undercurrent has been amply confirmed, during measurements completed a few days before Cromwell's death, by his colleagues J. A. Knauss and J. E. King. One result of four years in close collaboration with W. S. Wooster is a joint publication, in color, of a systematic analysis of data from the eastern tropical Pacific Ocean (Bull. Scripps Inst. Oceanogr., 1958). The subject that aroused Cromwell's keenest interest is the structure and formation of oceanic discontinuities, both fronts and thermoclines (Tellus, 1956; Bull. inter-Amer. trop. Tuna Comm., in press). His work was characterized throughout by close collaboration with his associates, who became his devoted friends. His personal charm and modesty, together with his scientific interest, led a number of oceanographers to join his field of activity. These include E. D. Stroup, G. W. Groves, and R. B. Montgomery.

== Personal life ==
Townsend Cromwell was born 3 November 1922 at Boston, Massachusetts, one of two sons of Richard and Lucile Cromwell. He married Katharine Huchthausen in 1947. Their children are Victoria, Katharine, Townsend, Carol Eugenia, and Elaine.

== Namesake ==
The United States Fish and Wildlife Service Bureau of Commercial Fisheries and National Oceanic and Atmospheric Administration fisheries research vessel NOAAS Townsend Cromwell (R 443) was named in Townsend Cromwell's honor.
