= VAQ-142 =

Electromagnetic Attack Squadron 142
- Active: 1 June 1988 - present
- Country: United States
- Branch: United States Navy
- Type: Electromagnetic Attack
- Role: Electromagnetic Warfare
- Part of: Carrier Air Wing Eight
- Garrison/HQ: NAS Whidbey Island
- Nickname: Gray Wolves
- Decorations: 2023 CNAL Battle "E" Award, the 2023 CNO Aviation Safety "S" Award, the 2013 COMPACFLT Retention Excellence Award, the 2013 CNAP Squadron Blue "M" Award, the 2013 Arleigh Burke Fleet Trophy, and the Enlisted Aviation Warfare Specialist pennant.

Commanders
- Current commander: CDR Drew "Weiner" Schnabel

Aircraft flown
- Attack: EA-6B Prowler; EA-18G Growler

Electromagnetic Attack Squadron 142 (VAQ-142), also known as "The Gray Wolves", is an EA-18G Growler squadron of the United States Navy stationed at Naval Air Station Whidbey Island, Oak Harbor, Washington. Their tailcode is AJ and their ATC callsign is "GRIM".

== Mission ==
Provide worldwide tactical Airborne Electronic Attack against targets at sea or ashore in support of U.S. and Coalition combat forces.

=== First VAQ-142 ===
Electronic Attack Squadron 142 (VAQ-142) was established 1 June 1988, in response to the Navy's requirement for a thirteenth operational EA-6B Prowler squadron. VAQ-142 "Grim Watchdogs" made their first and only deployment with Carrier Air Wing Six (CVW 6) embarked on USS Forrestal (CV-59) to the Mediterranean Sea in 1989–90. In fewer than three years as a squadron, VAQ-142 aviators flew aboard USS Carl Vinson (CVN-70), USS Abraham Lincoln (CVN-72), USS Forrestal (CV-59), USS Independence (CV-62), USS Saratoga (CV-60), and USS Midway (CV-41), logging more than 3,600 flight hours and 860 traps. As a result of defense spending reductions, VAQ-142 was disestablished in March 1991 and remaining personnel were transferred to a pre-establishment detachment for VAQ-35. On 1 June 1991 VAQ-35 was established with the Electronic Warfare Support mission, under the cognizance of Fleet Electronic Warfare Support Group (FEWSG). In their brief history, VAQ-35 made over forty-two detachments to more than sixteen locations. In October 1993, due to further spending cuts, VAQ-35 was disestablished, and their mission was absorbed by reserve squadrons based in the East and West Coasts.

=== Second VAQ-142 ===
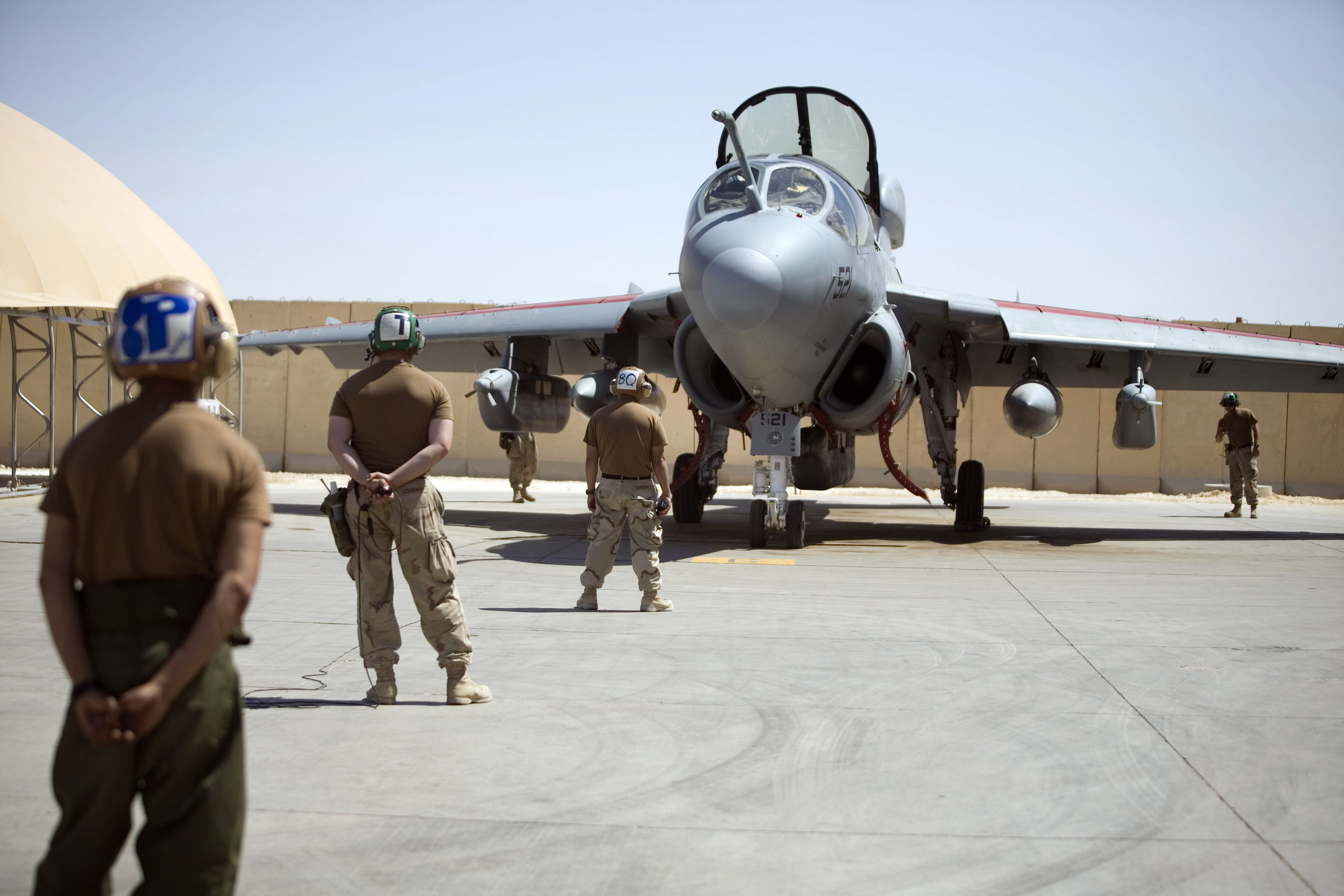
VAQ-142 EA-6B is prepared for launch at Al Asad Airbase in 2009

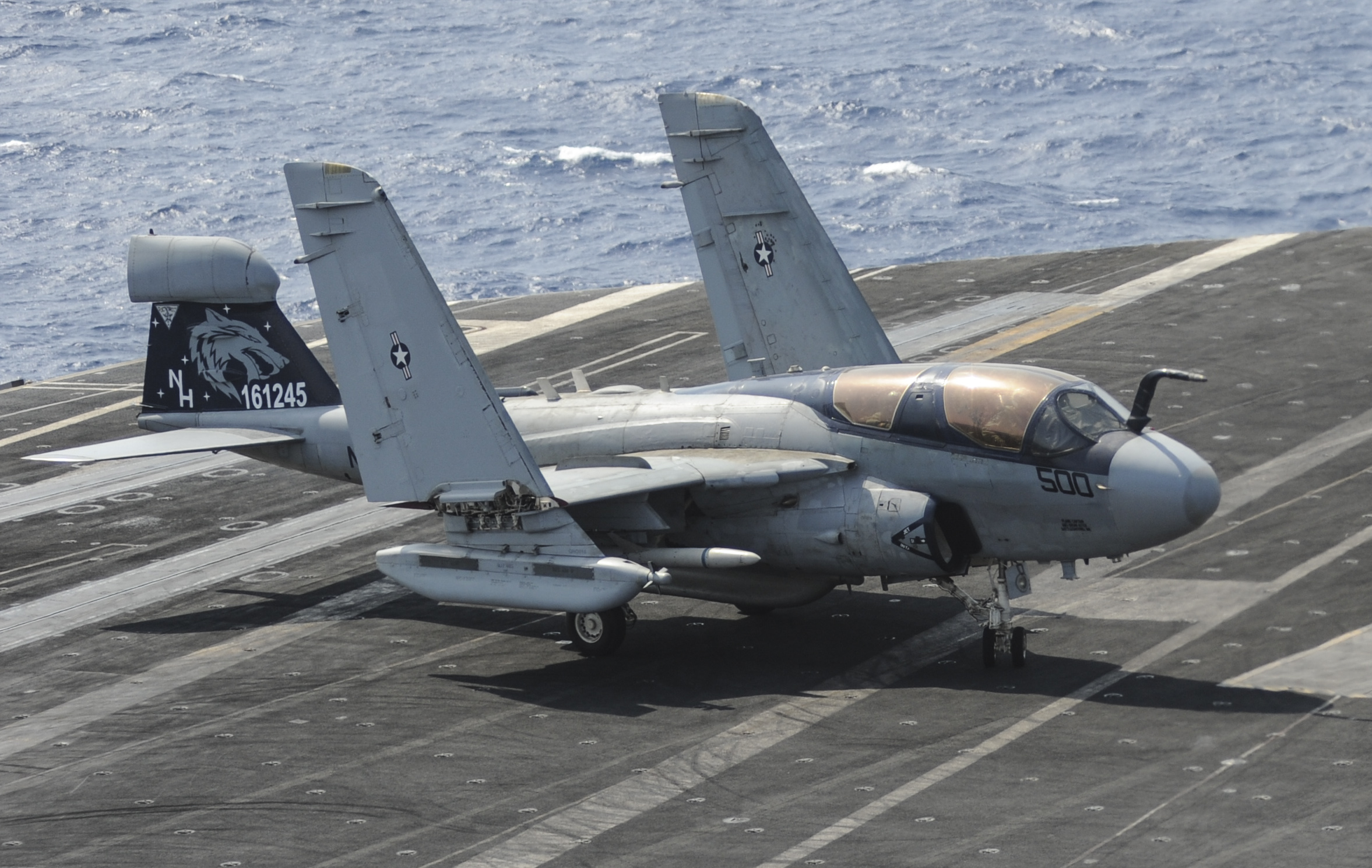
VAQ-142 EA-6B taxiing on USS Nimitz in 2013

In 1994, the Department of Defense sought to replace the Air Force's aging EF-111A Raven fleet and provide a joint service solution with the addition of five new expeditionary EA-6B squadrons. On 3 April 1997, the second and current squadron designated VAQ-142 was established as the fourth of these new squadrons, and officially designated the "Gray Wolves". Over the next four years, VAQ-142 forward deployed operationally around the world, participating in numerous multi-national exercises. The squadron saw their first combat deployment in 1998, when they deployed three times to Prince Sultan Air Base, Saudi Arabia in support of Operations Southern Watch and Desert Fox, and received both the 1998 Battle "E" and Safety "S" awards as well as the 1999 Association of Old Crows Outstanding Unit Award. From 1999 to 2002, the squadron deployed to Prince Sultan two more times in support of Operation Southern Watch and three times to Incirlik Air Base, Turkey in support of Operation Northern Watch, winning the Safety "S" again in both 2001 and 2002.

=== Afghanistan and Iraq ===
In December 2003, within a week of receiving short-notice deployment orders, the squadron departed en route to Bagram Air Base, Afghanistan in support of Operation Enduring Freedom. They were sent to relieve the small VAQ-137 detachment and this made them the first full Navy squadron to deploy completely to Afghanistan. Following an October 2004 deployment to MCAS Iwakuni, Japan, VAQ-142 returned to Bagram in July 2006 through January 2007, flying missions for 187 days in support of Operation Enduring Freedom. The squadron were awarded the 2006 Battle "E" and Safety "S" awards.

In October 2007, VAQ-142 deployed to Al Asad Airbase, Iraq, for six months as a forward deployed expeditionary squadron in support of Operation Iraqi Freedom. Following this deployment, the squadron received the 2007 Safety "S" and were awarded the 2008 Association of Old Crows Outstanding Unit Award. In 2008 the squadron returned to Al Asad in January 2009, again in support of the Iraq War. In May 2010, VAQ-142 returned a final time to Al Asad, flying missions in support of Operations Iraqi Freedom and New Dawn, and marking the final EA-6B expeditionary deployment to Iraq.

=== Return to the Air Wing ===
VAQ-142 returned to carrier aviation in May 2011 when they joined Carrier Air Wing Eleven (CVW 11) attached to USS Nimitz. After transition to the Improved Capability (ICAP) III EA-6B airframe, VAQ-142 and CVW-11 began work-ups with Carrier Qualification on board USS Nimitz in April 2012. In August 2012, the squadron completed the first squadron carrier detachment in over 21 years as part of the 2012 Rim of the Pacific Exercise (RIMPAC). In April 2013, VAQ-142 deployed with the USS Nimitz and CVW-11 as part of Carrier Strike Group Eleven (CSG 11) for a planned six-month deployment to the Fifth Fleet AOR. Once on station, the squadron flew 93 combat sorties totaling 637 flight hours with a 100% combat sortie completion rate in support of Operation Enduring Freedom. The Nimitz Strike Group was unexpectedly redirected to the Red Sea in response to the Syrian chemical weapons crisis. After several extensions in the Red Sea, the squadron ultimately completed a nine-month deployment that included operations in the U.S. Third, Fifth, Sixth, and Seventh Fleet AORs. Following this deployment, VAQ-142 received the 2013 Battle "E" and Safety "S" awards, and was awarded the 2013 Arleigh Burke Fleet Trophy.

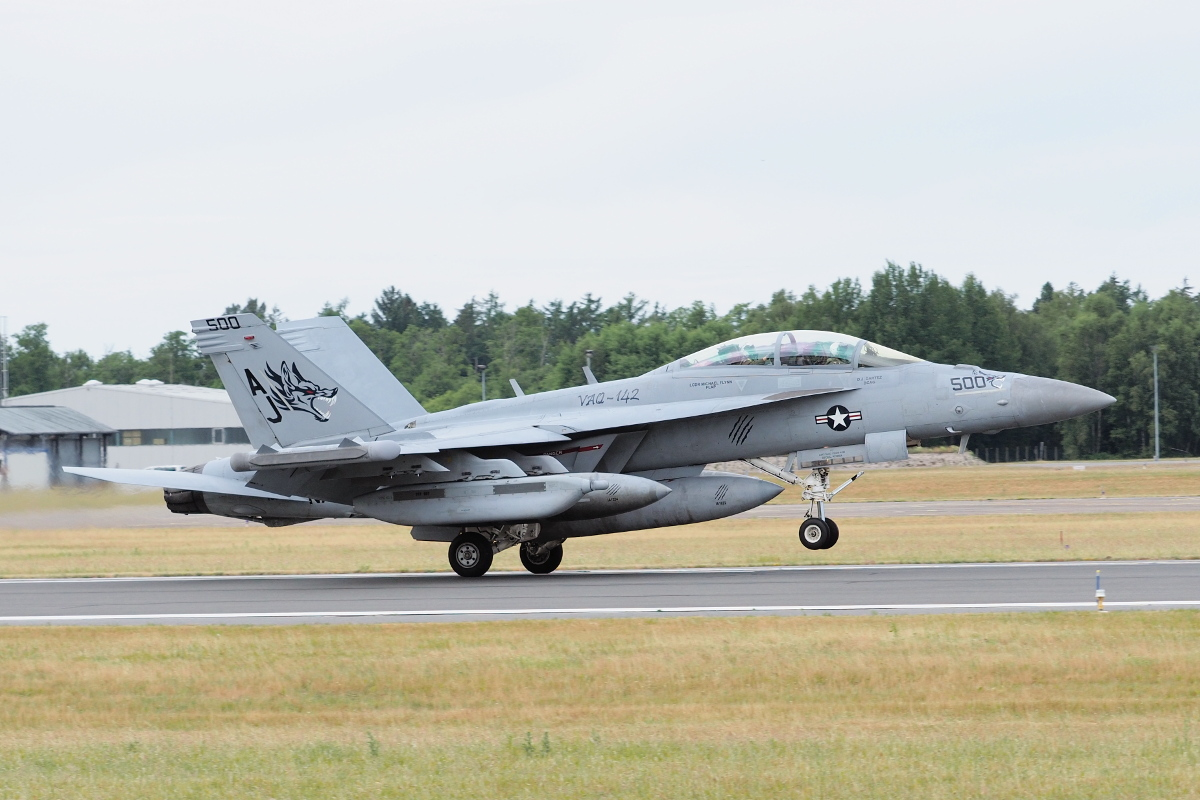
VAQ-142 EA-18G landing at Hohn Air Base during Air Defender 23

In July 2014 VAQ-142 delivered four EA-6B Improved Capability (ICAP) III Prowlers to the 309th Aerospace Maintenance and Regeneration Group (AMARG) for induction into long-term preservation. The squadron are currently at their homeport of NAS Whidbey Island, Washington, and recently completed their transition to the EA-18G Growler.

In May 2023, VAQ-142 embarked Gerald R Ford for her maiden deployment to the Mediterranean and received the 2023 Battle "E" and Safety "S" awards.

In November 2025, VAQ-142 within CVW-8 onboard the USS Gerald R Ford were re-tasked from their scheduled deployment in the Mediterranean and sent to the Caribbean to support Operation Southern Spear. After completing their support of Southern Spear in early February 2026, VAQ-142 and CVW-8 were again deployed across the Atlantic and into the Mediterranean to support potential combat operations against Iran.

In late Feb 2026, VAQ-142 and their E/A-18Gs undertook combat sorties within Operation Epic Fury against Iran. Combat sorties off the Ford began from the Eastern Mediterranean and moved to the Red Sea after close to a week of combat.

== See also ==
- History of the United States Navy
- List of United States Navy aircraft squadrons
