= VAQ-33 =

Electronic warfare squadron
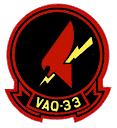
- VAQ-33 squadron patch
- Active: 1949-1 October 1993
- Country: United States
- Branch: United States Navy
- Role: Electronic warfare aircraft
- Part of: Inactive
- Nickname: Firebirds
- Engagements: Korean War; Vietnam War

Aircraft flown
- Attack: TBF Avenger; EA-1F Skyraider; ERA-3B Skywarrior; EA-6A Prowler

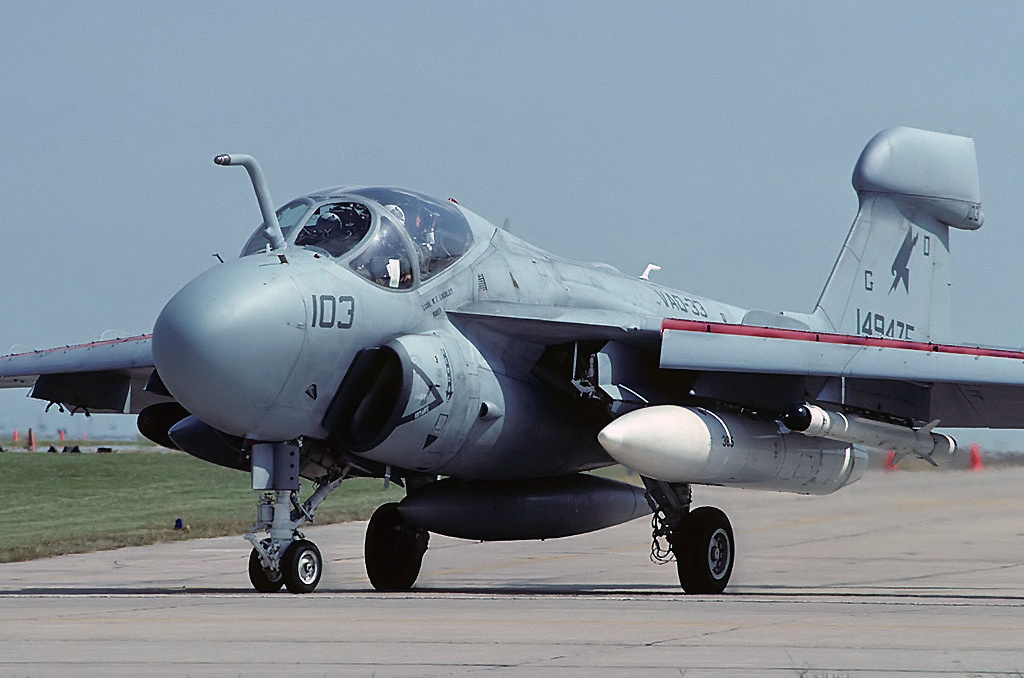
EA-6A from VAQ-33 visiting NAS Chase Field in Beeville, Texas, 20 October 1992.

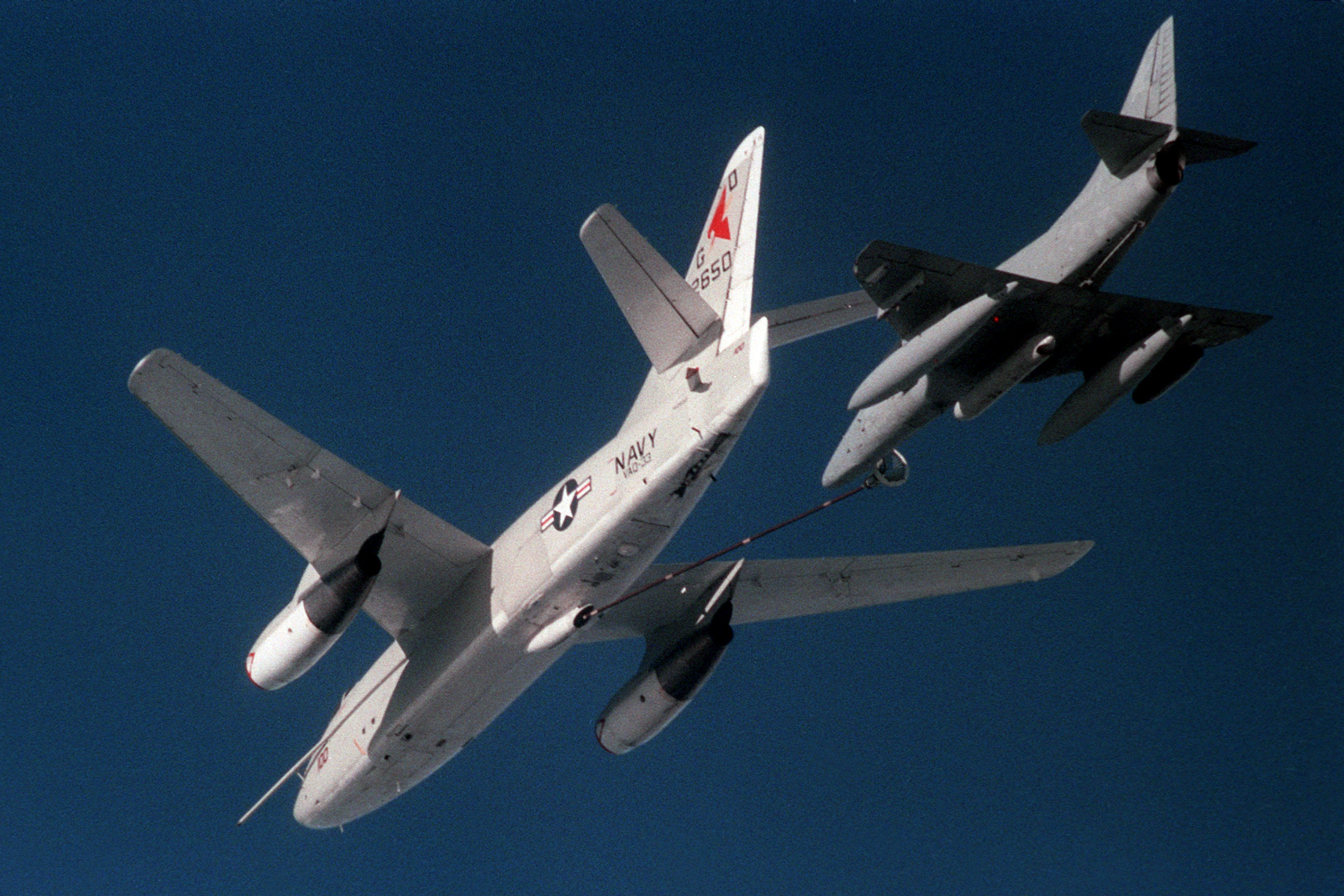
VAQ-33 A-3 Skywarrior (a.k.a. Whale) on refueling duty, 1980.

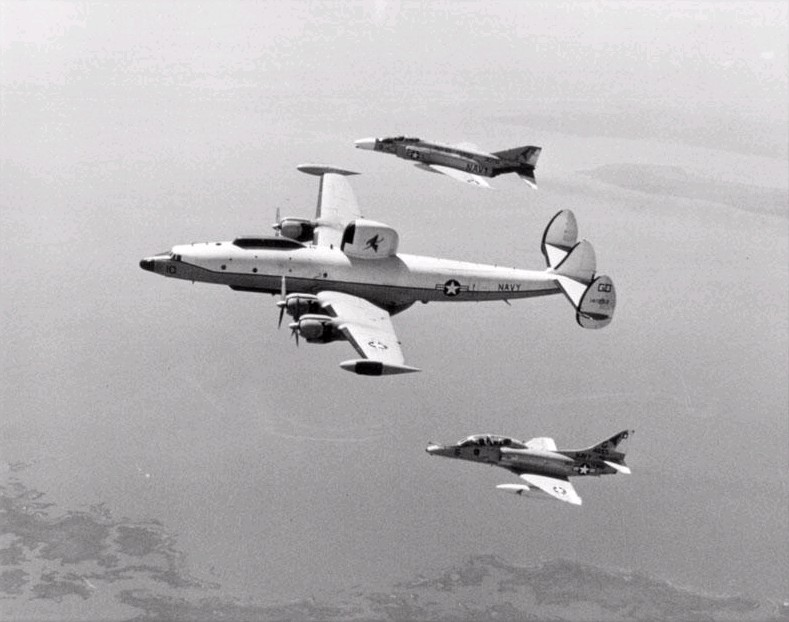
VAQ-33 NC-121K Warning Star with an EA-4F Skyhawk and an F-4B Phantom II in 1973. This was the last Warning Star on active duty, retiring in 1982.

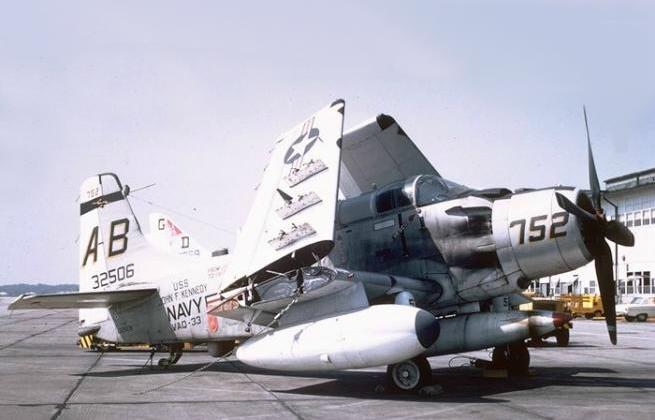
EA-1F Skyraider from VAQ-33 assigned to USS John F. Kennedy.

VAQ-33, nicknamed the Firebirds, was a Tactical Electronic Warfare Squadron of the U.S. Navy, serving for 44 years (1949–1993) under various designations and with a constantly-evolving group of aircraft. It was designated VAQ-33 in 1968, at which time it operated the piston-powered EA-1F Skyraider, or Spad. The squadron had the distinctions of being the last Navy unit to operate the A-1 Skyraider, and of making its last carrier deployment, in 1969. The retirement of the Spad marked the beginning of the squadron's decades-long role as a pioneering electronic aggressor squadron. That role ended with electronic aggressor missions being transferred to the Navy Reserve and the squadron's disestablishment at NAS Key West on 1 October 1993.

== History ==
The squadron was established in 1949 as Composite Squadron VC-33 at NAS Norfolk. It flew the TBM-3E/N/Q Avenger and a few SNB-5 Texans. Its mission was antisubmarine warfare (ASW). It moved to NAS Atlantic City in 1950, where its mission changed to night attack. It sent three detachments to the Korean War aboard carriers, where it distinguished itself in night attack and ECM missions.

In 1952, it adopted the nickname Nighthawks, and in 1956 was redesignated as an All-Weather Attack Squadron VA(AW)-33. In 1958, the squadron moved to NAS Quonset Point, and was soon redesignated Carrier Airborne Early Warning Squadron VAW-33. In 1961, it began providing ASW detachments to antisubmarine carriers in the Atlantic Fleet. In 1966, a VAW-33 detachment supported the recovery of the Gemini IX spacecraft. From 1967 to 1968, VAW-33 provided carrier-based ECM services in the Vietnam War zone.

Returning to NAS Norfolk in 1970, the squadron, now designated VAQ-33, adopted the Firebirds nickname, and came under operational control of the Fleet Electronic Warfare Support Group. Its new mission was to simulate electronic threats to units of the fleet. Its standard complement of aircraft soon became four ERA-3B Skywarriors, nicknamed Whales, four EA-4F Skyhawks, and one NC-121K Warning Star. Its detachments quickly became requested standard features of exercises in the fleet, simulating missiles and jamming radars from Norway to Hawaii. In 1976, the squadron began operating EF-4B and EF-4J Phantom IIs. In 1977, the Firebirds added a training version of the Whale and became the A-3 Skywarrior fleet replacement squadron (FRS), providing flight training, maintenance training, and carrier qualification services to A-3 crews.

The squadron moved to NAS Oceana in 1978, soon acquiring four ex-Marine Corps EA-6A Intruders. In 1980, the squadron made its final move, to NAS Key West. A P-3A Orion replaced their NC-121K, which had become the last "Connie" in the Navy.

During its last dozen years, VAQ-33 continued a high tempo of operations supporting the fleet. It was one of the few U.S. Navy Squadrons to utilize 'autonomous maintenance units’ or ‘AMU’s. The AMU’s performed as specific type squadrons within the main squadron. AMU-1 performed maintenance on the A-3 Skywarriors (known as ‘Whales’). Between 1988 and until the retirement of the Whale, VAQ-33 became a clearing house for some A-3 aircraft to be evaluated prior to dispensation to Davis Mothan AFB or Museum. AMU-2 performed maintenance on the TA-4J Skyhawks, and EA-6A and EA-6A Recap Electric Intruders. AMU-3 would perform maintenance on A-1 Sky Raiders, to be replaced by A-4 Sky Hawks, which was replaced by TA-7C and TA-7Z Corsair II aircraft. The TA-7Z Corsair II was an in-house avionics and airframe modification to support the squadrons electronic warfare mission, being capable of carrying a suite of electronic warfare pods. AMU-4 performed maintenance on P-3 Orion aircraft of several variants from P-3 (airframe #3) to P-3B which would go through Depot Level maintenance to convert it to the EP-3J being specifically made to support the squadron's mission. AMU-5 performed maintenance on F-4 Phantom II aircraft. AMU-6 performed intermediate level maintenance on the electronic warfare pods the aircraft carried. The EA-6A became its only jet aircraft, while it retained three turboprop P-3 Orions. The squadron's success in its mission was shown by the establishment in 1983 of VAQ-34 at NAS Point Mugu and in 1991 of VAQ-35 at NAS Whidbey Island. Its role as an A-3 FRS ended with the retirement of the Whale in 1991. The electronic aggressor mission was eventually transferred to the Navy Reserve. The 2 EP-3J Orions were transferred to a Navy Reserve Squadron (Patrol Squadron 66 (VP-66)) to continue performing the electronic warfare aggressor missions. That was a new mission for VP-66 and the squadron's manning was increased in order to accomplish the new mission in addition to all the squadron's other missions. VAQ-33 finally wound down operations during 1993. In keeping with its "last to fly this airplane" tradition, its EA-6As were the last of their kind retired from service. The squadron was disestablished on 1 October 1993.

== See also ==
- History of the United States Navy
- List of inactive United States Navy aircraft squadrons
