= Lockheed EC-121 Warning Star =

Airborne early warning and control aircraft based on the Constellation airframe

EC-121 Warning Star
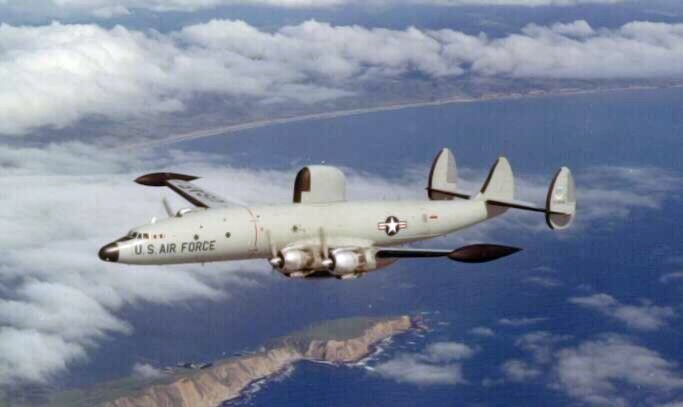
- EC-121T Warning Star

General information
- Type: Airborne early warning and control
- National origin: United States
- Manufacturer: Lockheed Corporation
- Primary user: United States Navy, United States Air Force
- Number built: 232

History
- Manufactured: 1953–1958
- Introduction date: 1954
- First flight: 9 June 1949
- Retired: 1978 (USAF); 1982 (USN)
- Developed from: L-749 Constellation; L-1049 Super Constellation; C-121 Constellation

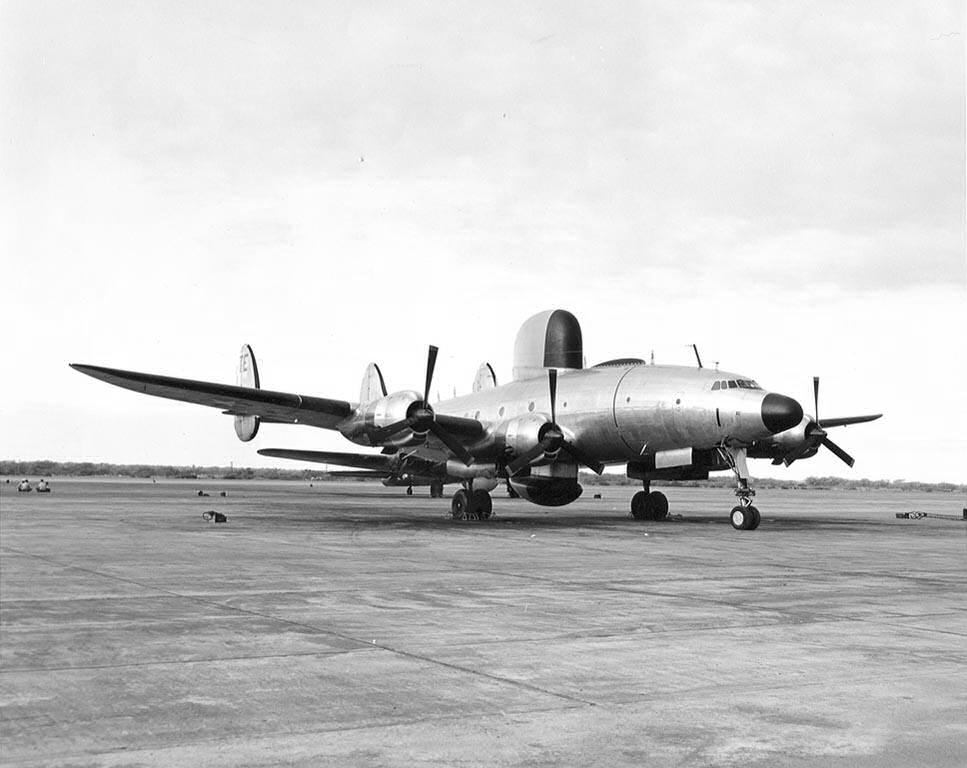
Second PO-1W prototype at NAS Barbers Point 1952

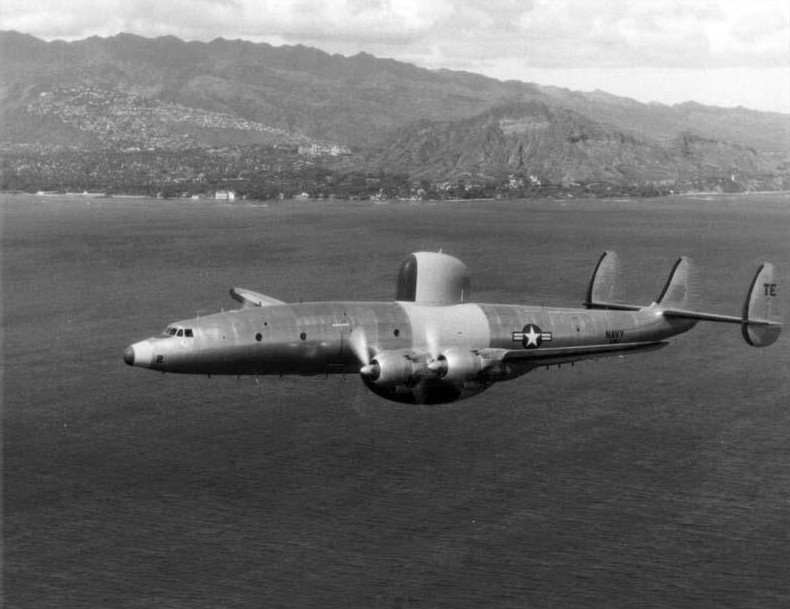
Third production WV-2 in flight 1954

The Lockheed EC-121 Warning Star is an American airborne early warning and control radar surveillance aircraft operational in the 1950s in both the United States Navy (USN) and United States Air Force (USAF).

The military version of the Lockheed L-1049 Super Constellation was used to serve as an airborne early warning system to supplement the Distant Early Warning Line, using two large radomes (a vertical dome above and a horizontal one below the fuselage). It replaced the TBM-3W used by the USN. Some EC-121s were also used for signal intelligence gathering. The EC-121 was introduced in 1954 and phased out in 1978, although a single specially modified EW aircraft remained in USN service until 1982.

The USN versions when initially procured were designated WV-1 (PO-1W), WV-2, and WV-3. The USAF Warning Stars served during the Vietnam War both as electronic sensor monitors and as a forerunner to the Boeing E-3 Sentry AWACS. USAF aircrews adopted its civil nickname, "Connie" (diminutive of Constellation) as reference, USN aircrews used the nickname "Willie Victor".

== Development ==
Since 1943, the Lockheed Constellation had been in USAAF service as the C-69. The use of the Constellation by the USN for patrol and airborne early warning duties was first investigated in 1949, when the USN acquired two Lockheed L-749 Constellations. First flown on 9 June 1949, the PO-1W carried large, long-range radars in massive radomes above and below the fuselage. As the radomes possessed considerably more side area, the vertical stabilizers of the PO-1W had to be enlarged. After the PO-1W (redesignated WV-1 in 1952) had proved that operating large radars on aircraft was possible, the USN ordered the WV-2 based on the L-1049 Super Constellation. The WV-1s were transferred to the Federal Aviation Agency in 1958–1959.

The WV-2/EC-121D was initially fitted with a dorsal AN/APS-45 height finder and a ventral AN/APS-20 search radar. These were later upgraded to AN/APS-103 and AN/APS-95 radars, although not simultaneously. The crew commonly numbered 18, six officers (two pilots, two navigators, and two weapons controllers) and 12 enlisted (two flight engineers, one radio operator, two crew chiefs, five radar operators, and two radar technicians). However, when North Korea shot down a Navy EC-121 in 1969, a crew of 31 was on board.

Orders were placed totaling 142 PO-2W Constellations based on the Lockheed L-1049 Super Constellation, with deliveries beginning in 1953. The PO-2W was redesignated WV-2 in 1954. In 1962, with standardization of aircraft designations within the Department of Defense, the WV-2 then became the EC-121K. In total, 13 of these were converted to WV-2Q electronic intelligence (ELINT) aircraft (becoming EC-121M in 1962). Nine were converted to WV-3 weather reconnaissance aircraft (WC-121N in 1962). The EC-121K was also operated by Training Squadron 86 (VT-86) at NAS Glynco, Georgia, for training of student naval flight officers destined to fly both the EC-121 and the Grumman E-2 Hawkeye. At NAS Glynco's closure, VT-86 transferred to NAS Pensacola, Florida, in 1973, the squadron's last EC-121 was also flown to NAS Pensacola, being stored in the collection of the National Museum of Naval Aviation, where it still remains. A single aircraft became an NC-121K, the electronic warfare variant assigned to Tactical Electronic Warfare Squadron 33 (VAQ-33) at NAS Key West, Florida. The aircraft was the last EC-121 in operational service, flying until 25 June 1982.

The USAF received 10 RC-121C and 74 EC-121D Warning Stars also based on the L-1049, beginning with diversions from the Navy contracts in October 1953. The 10 RC-121Cs became trainers, designated TC-121C. Between 1966 and 1969, 30 retired USN EC-121s were transferred to USAF and converted in EC-121Rs as sensor-monitoring aircraft. Of the 74 EC-121s, 42 were converted to the EC-121H upgrade beginning in 1962, and in 1969, 15 of the remaining EC-121Ds and seven of the EC-121Hs were further upgraded into the final operational variant, the EC-121T, serving as an AWACS prototype in Southeast Asia in 1972. Five EC-121Ds were modified to be broadcasting aircraft for psychological warfare operations, the predecessors of the EC-130 Commando Solo.

== Operational service ==
=== USN ===
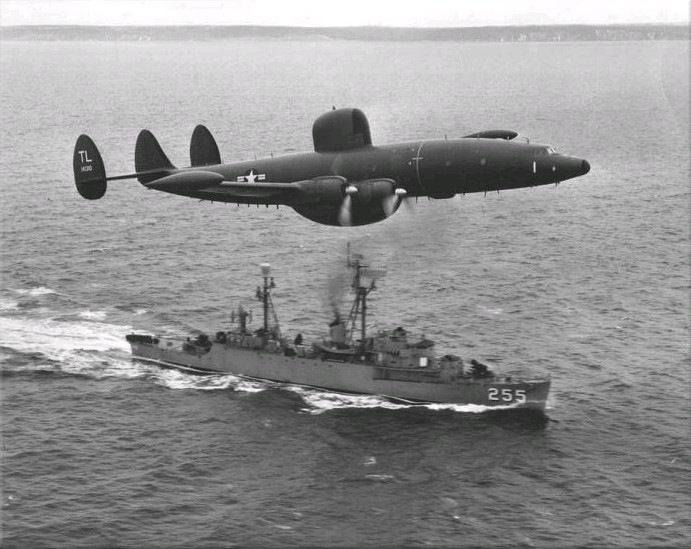
BARLANT WV-2 of VW-15 overflies USS Sellstrom off Newfoundland in 1957

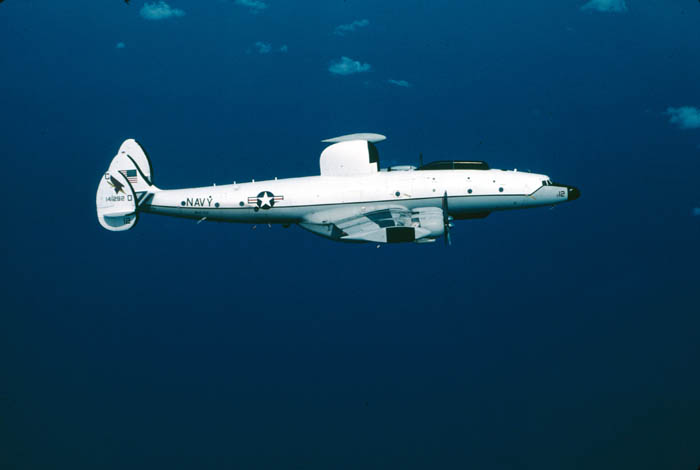
Last "Connie" in the USN on its last flight to Davis-Monthan AFB for retirement in April 1982, VAQ-33 (GD 12) NC-121K (BuNo 141292)

WV-2s, redesignated EC-121s in 1962, served from 1954 to 1965 in two "barrier" forces, one off each coast of the North American continent. The barrier forces consisted of five surface picket stations each manned by radar destroyer escorts and an air wing of WV-2s/EC-121s that patrolled the picket lines at 1,000–4,000 m (3,000–12,000 ft) altitude in 6- to 20-hour missions. Their objective was to extend early warning coverage against surprise Soviet bomber and missile attacks as an extension of the DEW Line.

In April 1954, the first Lockheed Super Constellation (Model 1049C), WV-2 BuNo. 128323, was received at NAS Barbers Point by Airborne Early Warning Squadron One (VW-1).

The Atlantic Barrier (BARLANT) consisted of two rotating squadron detachments sourced from AEW Squadron Thirteen (VW-13) and AEW Squadron Fifteen (VW-15) from NAS Patuxent River, Maryland and one squadron, AEW Squadron Eleven (VW-11), permanently based at Naval Station Argentia, Newfoundland. Their mission was to fly orbits to the Azores and back. An additional AEW training unit was based at NAS Patuxent River for training flight crews and maintenance personnel.

BARLANT became operational on 1 July 1956, and flew continuous coverage until early 1965. The barrier was shifted to cover the approaches between Greenland, Iceland, and the United Kingdom (GIUK) barrier in June 1961. Aircraft from Argentia were staged through NAS Keflavik, Iceland, to extend coverage times.

The Pacific Barrier (BARPAC) received the first operational AEW squadron, Airborne Early Warning Squadron One (VW-1) and the first EC-121K aircraft. AEW Squadron Three followed with AEW Squadrons Twelve, Fourteen, and Sixteen. In January 1958 VW-1 and VW-3 relocated to NAS Agana, Guam, M.I. where VW-1 continued its AEW commitments and VW-3 operational commitment was divided between AEW and weather. BARPAC became operational with AEW Squadron Twelve (VW-12) based at NAS Barbers Point, Hawaii, operating from a deployment base at NAS Midway on 1 July 1958 and later expanded to include AEW Squadrons Fourteen (VW-14) and Sixteen (VW-16). Their orbits overlapped the radar picket stations of the ships of Escort Squadron Seven, from roughly Adak Island to Midway. Normally, five WV-2s/EC-121s were required at any single time to provide coverage over the entire line.

The Hawaiian barrier force operations were discontinued by September 1965, and their EC-121K aircraft were placed in storage. However, VW-1 continued operating until 1972, flying weather ops and supplying AEW to naval forces in the Gulf of Tonkin. USN C-121, EC-121, WC-12,1 and NC-121 operations continued until 1975 in seven other squadrons and until 1982 in an eighth. Some EC-121s were used in Vietnam, mirroring USAF EC-121 missions, but orbiting the Gulf of Tonkin, as that was the USN's assigned area.

Fleet Air Reconnaissance Squadron One (VQ-1) and Fleet Air Reconnaissance Squadron Two (VQ-2) operated EC-121M ELINT gathering aircraft at NAF Atsugi, Japan, and Naval Station Rota, Spain, respectively, until they transitioned to the EP-3B Orion and EP-3E Aries aircraft.

Weather Reconnaissance Squadron Four (VW-4) operated WV-3-cum-WC-121s between 1954 and 1975 as Hurricane Hunters, with its primary base at NAS Jacksonville, Florida, and a forward base at Naval Station Roosevelt Roads, Puerto Rico. Its Pacific counterpart, Weather Reconnaissance Squadron Three (VW-3) Typhoon Trackers was the operational weather squadron in the Pacific, flying from NAS Agana, Guam, tracking typhoons from 1955 to 1960. On June 30, 1960 Weather Reconnaissance Squadron Three, VW-3, disbanded and many of its aircraft (8 - BuNo. 145 series) and crews were absorbed by VW-1, which retained AEW designation and took on the weather commitments and the Title of "Typhoon Trackers" of VW-3. VW-4 later transitioned to WP-3A Orion.

Also operating C-121 and EC-121 aircraft was Oceanographic Development Squadron Eight (VXN-8) at NAS Patuxent River, Maryland, which employed the aircraft for specific projects (e.g., Project BIRDSEYE, MAGNET, ASWEPS etc.) for the Office of Naval Research until they were replaced by RP-3A and RP-3D Orion aircraft. VXN-8 also operated four additional NC-121 aircraft called the "Blue Eagles". These specially modified aircraft were equipped with complete radio and television transmitting equipment and studios for simultaneous broadcast of American and Vietnamese television and radio programs prior to the installation of ground stations during the Vietnam War. The aircraft flew nightly 7 days per week broadcasting such American TV programs as Combat, Have Gun-Will Travel, and Gunsmoke, along with other popular programs of the time in addition to Vietnamese programs recorded prior to each flight. Nightly American news broadcasts were transmitted live using an onboard TV studio and an Air Force newscaster bringing the latest news from home and the world. The "Blue Eagles" operated out of Saigon and Danang Air Bases for around 5 years commencing in 1965.

Air Development Squadron Six (VX-6, based at NAS Quonset Point, Rhode Island, also operated R7V aircraft, redesignated C-121J, in support of United States Antarctic Program operations until replaced by LC-130F Hercules aircraft.

The EC-121 was also operated by Training Squadron 86 (VT-86) at NAS Glynco, Georgia, for training student naval flight officers destined for the E-2 Hawkeye and by Tactical Electronic Warfare Squadron 33 (VAQ-33) for the Fleet Electronic Warfare Systems Group (FEWSG) at NAS Norfolk, Virginia, and later, following a squadron homeport change, at NAS Key West, Florida. At the time of its retirement on June 25, 1982, VAQ-33's NC-121K aircraft, Buno 141292 was the last NC-121K and the last of its type operated by the USN.

=== USAF ===
The USAF operated EC-121s between 1954 and 1978, with three wings at maximum employment and three independent squadrons as operations wound down. Until the Vietnam War, their primary mission was to provide complementary early warning radar coverage to the Pacific and Atlantic barriers by flying orbits 300 miles (480 km) offshore from the continental United States in what were termed "contiguous barriers". The coverage orbits overlapped those of land-based early warning radars.

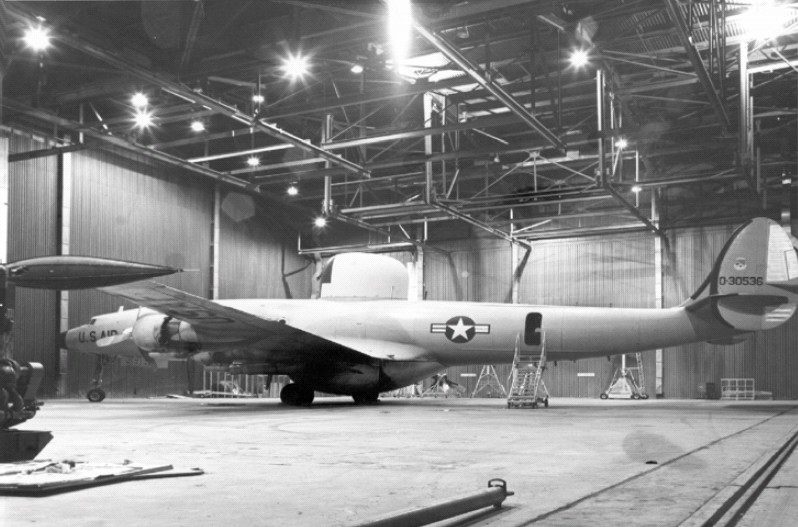
552nd AEWCW EC-121D at McClellan AFB

Initial deployment of EC-121Cs began with 551st Airborne Early Warning and Control Wing, based at Otis Air Force Base, Massachusetts. Operational on 21 December 1954, 551st AEWCW subsequently upgraded to EC-121D and later EC-121H Warning Stars.

Its Pacific counterpart was 552d Airborne Early Warning and Control Wing (AEWCW), based at McClellan Air Force Base, California, becoming operational on 1 July 1955. After the Cuban Missile Crisis in 1962, 552nd AEWCW also had administrative control of the 966th AEWCS, based at McCoy Air Force Base, Florida. The 966th had a dual mission - monitoring activity in Cuban airspace and flying Gold Digger missions (continuous tracks of U-2 surveillance missions).

The third air wing to operate EC-121s was 553rd Reconnaissance Wing, a Vietnam war organization activated in 1967 and based in Thailand until inactivation in 1970 (See BatCat below). In 1966, Lockheed modified 30 ex-USN Super Constellations (two EC-121P/WV-3 and 28 EC-121K/WV-2) aircraft to EC-121Rs for the specialized reconnaissance mission flown by the 553rd. Aircraft were delivered during the course of 1967. The 553rd RW flew over land and off the coast of Vietnam, over Laos and Cambodia, monitoring and retransmitting low-power signals. Usually, they orbited the Ho Chi Minh Trail in 8-hour shifts. As it was expensive to operate and it exposed a large crew to enemy fire, it was replaced in December 1970 by the much smaller (and eventually unmanned drone) QU-22 Pave Eagle sensor monitor.

The 551st AEWCW inactivated in 1969, while the 552d was reduced by a squadron in 1971. In July 1974, USAF redesignated 552d Airborne Early Warning and Control Wing as 552d Airborne Warning and Control Group when it was downsized to a single squadron. It inactivated in April 1976.

As the USAF prepared for deploying the E-3 Sentry in the later 1970s, it phased out EC-121 operations by the end of 1975. All remaining EC-121s transferred to Air Force Reserve, which formed the 79th AEWCS at Homestead Air Force Base, Florida, in early 1976. The active duty force continued providing personnel to operate the EC-121s on a 24-hour basis, assigning Detachment 1, 20th Air Defence Squadron to Homestead AFB as associate active duty crews to fly the AFRES-owned aircraft. Besides monitoring Cuban waters, these last Warning Stars also operated from NAS Keflavik. Final EC-121 ops ended in September 1978. Detachment 1 dissolved and 79th AEWCS was redesignated a fighter squadron on 1 October 1978.

In 1967, five EC-121s became operational with the 193rd Tactical Electronic Warfare Squadron of the Pennsylvania Air National Guard, responsible for psychological operations missions under project Coronet Solo. From July 1970 to January 1971, they rotated on 30- to 90-day temporary-duty deployments to Korat Royal Thai Air Force Base, Thailand, under the name Commando Buzz.

== Vietnam War ==
EC-121s were used extensively in Southeast Asia between 16 April 1965, and 1 June 1974, particularly in support of Operation Rolling Thunder and Operation Linebacker/Linebacker II, providing radar early warning and limited airborne control of USAF fighter forces engaging MiG interceptors. Flying orbits over the Gulf of Tonkin and later over Laos, they were the forerunners of AWACS aircraft. The USN used a variant, the NC-121, in their Blue Eagle unit from 1965–1972. Blue Eagles were television- and radio-broadcasting airplanes. The Blue Eagles were based at NAS Patuxent River and were part of oceanographic squadron VXN-8.

=== Big Eye ===
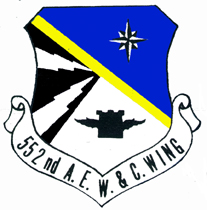

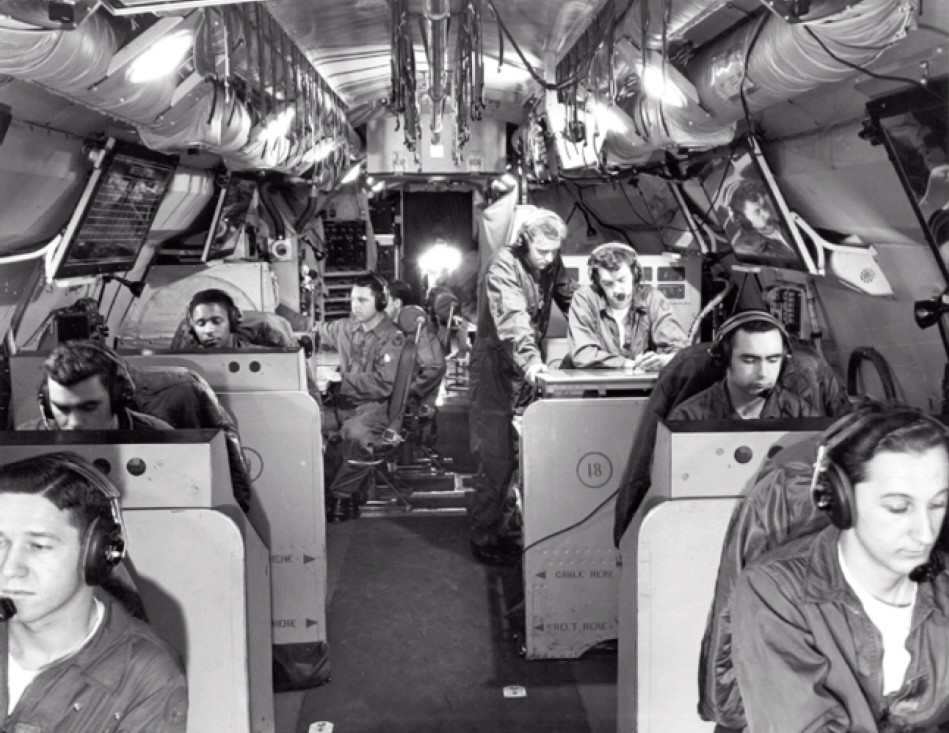
Operators in a USAF EC-121D/T

At the onset of Rolling Thunder, the North Vietnamese had an advantage in that their radar coverage could detect most US strike aircraft flying at or above 5,000 feet (1,500 m) virtually anywhere in the country, using a system that was difficult to jam. US forces countered with radar ships (Crown) in the Gulf of Tonkin and a ground site at Nakhon Phanom RTAFB, Thailand, but both systems were line-of-sight and suffered coverage gaps.

To increase coverage, the Seventh Air Force (7 AF) requested airborne radar support and the Air Defense Command (redesignated Aerospace Defense Command in 1968) was directed to set up the Big Eye Task Force. Five EC-121Ds and 100 support personnel of the 552nd AEWCW at McClellan AFB were deployed to Tainan Air Station, Taiwan, with four of the EC-121s sent on to a forward operating location at Tan Son Nhut Air Base, near Saigon, South Vietnam.

The EC-121s were designed for detection of aircraft flying over water, so ground clutter (spurious signal returns off of terrain features such as mountains) caused interference with their radar pictures. The crews, however, were experienced in tracking Soviet aircraft over Cuba and had developed a technique whereby an EC-121 flying at 50 feet (15 m) to 300 feet (91 m) above water could bounce a signal from its bottom-mounted APS-95 Search radar off the surface of the water and detect aircraft at medium altitudes out to 150 miles (240 km). Operating in pairs, one Big Eye EC-121 flew a 50 miles (80 km) race track pattern approximately 30 miles (48 km) offshore (Alpha orbit), with the orbit's center at 19°25′N 107°25′E. The second one flew a track at 10,000 feet (3,000 m) (Bravo orbit) farther from the coast, acting as a spare for the Alpha EC-121.

This provided a practical detection range of 100 miles (160 km), enough to cover the Hanoi urban area and the main MiG base at Phúc Yên. A major disadvantage of this arrangement, however, was that most MiG contacts were beyond the 70 miles (110 km) range of the Big Eye's APS-45 Height Finder radar, so that they were unable to provide this data to USAF strike forces. Furthermore, technical shortcomings in the EC-121D's systems precluded either controlling a fighter intercept or identifying a specific flight under attack.

The missions from Tan Son Nhut AB began 21 April 1965, using callsigns Ethan Alpha and Ethan Bravo, which became standard. After refueling at Danang Air Base, Ethan Alpha made a wave-top approach to its orbit station, where it remained for five hours. Because of the threat of MiG interception, EC-121s were protected by a Lockheed F-104 Starfighter MiGCAP. If, for any reason, the MiGCAP could not rendezvous, the EC-121s cancelled their mission. Air-conditioning systems aboard the EC-121 were virtually useless in this profile, and the heat produced by the electronics, combined with the threat of being shot down, made Alpha orbit missions in particular very stressful. On 10 July 1965, in its first airborne-controlled interception, an EC-121 provided warning to a pair of USAF F-4C fighters, resulting in the shooting down of two MiG-17s.

The Big Eye Task Force remained at Tan Son Nhut until February 1967, when the threat of Viet Cong ground attacks prompted a move to Thailand.

=== College Eye ===
In March 1967, Big Eye was renamed College Eye Task Force (CETF) and relocated at Ubon Royal Thai Air Force Base. Because of the complexity of the aircraft and its systems along with the large support group it required, CETF could not be supported at the relatively small Thai bases. It moved to Udon RTAFB in July and to its final station at Korat RTAFB in October 1967. Seven of 26 EC-121s deployed from Otis AFB and arrived at Korat, on the 19th.

From April 1965 to early 1966 and beginning again in late 1967, the EC-121Ds also controlled a flight of MiGCAP fighters for unarmed support aircraft operating over the Tonkin Gulf. The EC-121Ds also served as an airborne communications relay center for strike aircraft to transmit mission results and position reports to Danang Air Control Center; directed operations of fighter escorts, MiGCAPs, Lockheed C-130 Hercules flare ships and A-26 strike aircraft along the North Vietnamese-Laotian border; provided radar and navigational assistance for combat search and rescue missions; and assisted fighters in finding tankers for emergency refueling.

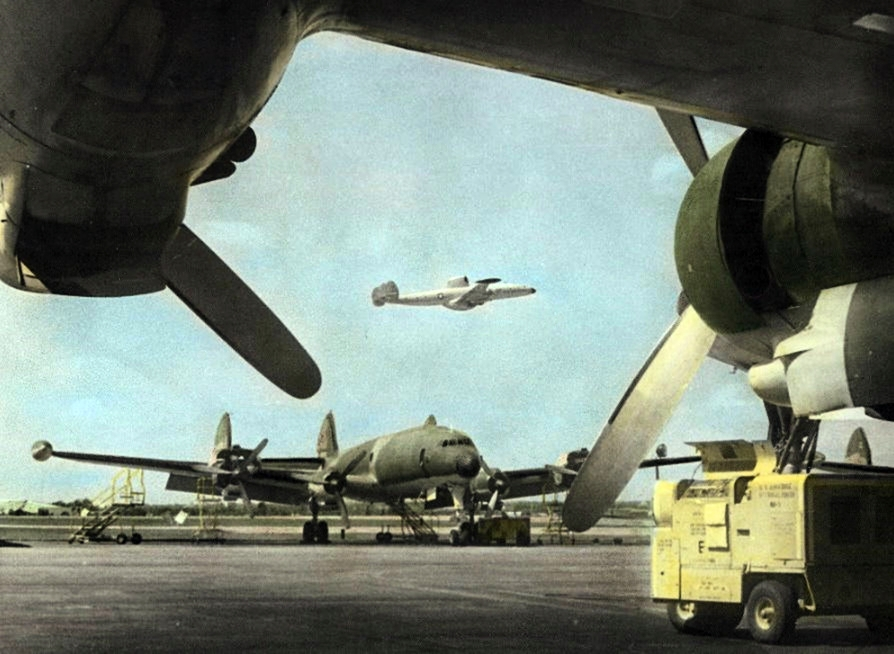
College Eye EC-121D taking off from Korat RTAFB

In May 1966, the government of China formally protested an incursion by a Republic F-105 Thunderchief pursuing a North Vietnamese MiG it subsequently shot down 25 miles (40 km) inside Chinese territory. A US board of inquiry recommended that College Eye also had to monitor the "no-fly zone" inside the North Vietnamese border with China, to provide alerts to US aircraft nearing the buffer zone and to report border crossing violations by US aircraft. This could not be done from the gulf, so a third orbit, Ethan Charlie, was created in Laos. After tests in June and August, regular missions began 24 August. Not enough EC-121s or crews were available to support three orbits twice daily, so the Laotian orbit was only flown every third day, with Ethan Bravo missions cancelled on those days. After 13 October 1966, the Charlie orbit was flown every day and the Bravo orbit suspended altogether. In April 1967, four more EC-121s were deployed, to Thailand on 29 May, making for a total strength of three College Eyes in Taiwan and six in Thailand.

In April 1967, USAF began fitting its entire EC-121 fleet with QRC-248 IFF transponder interrogators. QRC-248 had been developed to follow Soviet-export aircraft flown by the Cuban Air Force. The SRO-2 transponders installed in Soviet export MiGs enabled Cuban ground-controlled interception (GCI) radars to identify and control their fighters. A testbed EC-121 called Quick Look had flown with College Eye in January 1967 to test QRC-248 and found that North Vietnamese MiGs used the same transponder. QRC-248 accurately discriminated MiG radar returns from the myriad returns picked up during a mission and extended the range of low-altitude detection to more than 175 miles (282 km), covering virtually all important North Vietnamese target areas.

By May, all College Eyes had been fitted with QRC-248. Ethan Bravo's mission was changed from that of a backup for Ethan Alpha to being the primary QRC-248 listener, but College Eye was prohibited by the Joint Chiefs of Staff from actively "interrogating" MiG transponders, following a National Security Agency security policy protecting its "intelligence sources" (of which the QRC-248 was one), thus was restricted to waiting for North Vietnamese GCI to interrogate its aircraft. QRC-248 began regular use in July 1967, but by then North Vietnam's MiG force, which had suffered serious losses in May, had suspended its combat operations.

In the last week of August, however, after a period of intensive training and revision of tactics, the MiGs began engaging US strike forces again, scoring a number of kills. Then, Seventh Air Force finally obtained permission for the new Ethan Bravo mission EC-121 to actively interrogate with QRC-248 on 6 October. By 4 December, its success outweighed any value in flying the Ethan Alpha orbit, which was discontinued until July 1972.

On 1 March 1968, College Eye callsigns changed to Ethan 01, 02, 03 and 04. Ethan 03 (Laotian orbit) began "positive control" (airborne direction) of C-130 flareship flights and A-26 Invader night interdiction missions along the Ho Chi Minh Trail in Laos on 19 April 1968.

The task force was scaled back in July 1968, to four EC-121Ds and the Rivet Top testbed aircraft to allow for the basing of another College Eye detachment at Itazuke AB, Japan. The name of the task force was discontinued in October 1968, when it was redesignated a final time as Detachment 1 (Rotational), 552nd AEWCW. EC-121 deployments to Southeast Asia were discontinued in June 1970 in the expectation that they would no longer be used.

=== Rivet Top ===
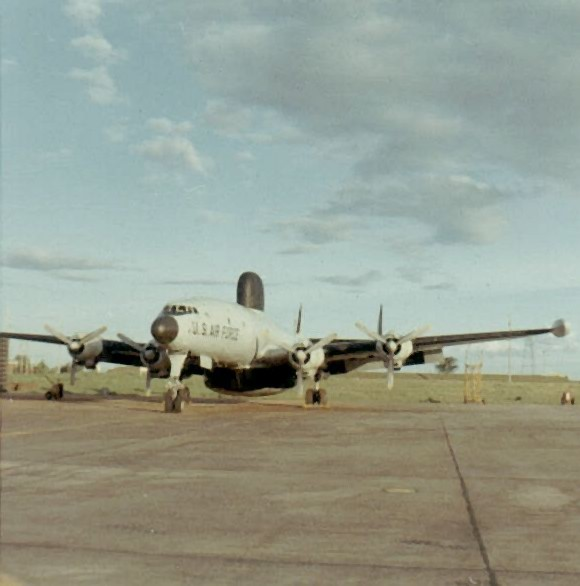
EC-121K "Rivet Top" (AF Ser. No. 57-143184) at Korat RTAFB, 1967–1968. This was a former USN EC-121K, BuNo 143184, transferred to USAF and modified.

In August 1967, while the College Eye Task Force was still based at Udon RTAFB, another prototype EC-121 variation began operations testing new equipment as Detachment 2 of the Tactical Air Warfare Center. Known as Rivet Top, (Note: Programs developed under the auspices of the Big Safari "rapid procurement" office have two-word identifiers beginning with the word "Rivet.") this modified EC-121K (later redesignated EC-121M) carried the QRC-248 newly installed in the College Eye aircraft and also had electronic interrogators capable of reading two additional Soviet transponders, the SRO-1 and SOD-57. Its electronics were custom built rather than off-the-shelf. Its most important upgrade was the top-secret Rivet Gym installation. This consisted of the addition to the crew of Vietnamese-speaking intelligence specialists manning four voice communications intercept stations able to monitor all communications between the MiGs and their GCI controllers.

Despite this advantage, Rivet Top experienced two problems, reducing its effectiveness. Its operators did not have radar scopes to correlate intercepted conversations with specific flights of MiGs, thus could not determine which US aircraft might be under attack. Secondly, like QRC-248, Rivet Gym was an NSA SIGINT asset and subject to even more stringent rules protecting knowledge of its existence. Even when real-time warnings to US aircraft were finally permitted in mid-1972, fighter crews were not made aware of the source of the warnings and because EC-121 radio communications were poor, mandating the use of a radio relay aircraft that often failed, they tended to disregard the credibility of the source.

The Rivet Top prototype moved to Korat RTAFB along with the College Eye Task Force in October 1967. Originally scheduled to return to the USA in February 1968, because of its value, it remained at Korat until 1969. Flying daily missions through its testing period, it began flying every-other-day missions over the Gulf of Tonkin after 31 March 1968, when Rolling Thunder operations were sharply scaled back. Rivet Gym installations were back-fitted to all College Eye EC-121s by the end of May 1968.

=== Operation Kingpin ===
Two EC-121Ds, newly modified with the Southeast Asia Operational Requirement 62 (SEAOR-62) electronics suite, but not yet operational as EC-121Ts, were ordered to Korat RTAFB in October 1970. Under the guise of being field tested, they were accompanied by a C-121G carrying additional crew members, the most experienced 552nd AEWCW technicians, and equipment necessary to maintain the new electronics. The SEAOR-62 package was supported by a digital data receiver ground terminal and by radio relay equipment transshipped by separate classified airlift. The EC-121Ts arrived in Thailand from McClellan AFB on 12 November.

The purpose of the deployment was to provide an integrated tactical data display with real-time inputs (similar to the Navy Airborne Tactical Data System equipping E-1B Tracer platforms of Task Force 77) in support of Operation Kingpin, a mission to rescue US prisoners of war held at Son Tay prison. Once at Korat, some equipment was tested for the first time because of emission restrictions in US airspace and the only available manuals and checklists were notes from early flight tests. Even so, both aircraft were operational by 17 November.

On 20 November 1970, two Warning Stars, using the callsigns Frog 01 and 02, respectively, took off 10 minutes apart at 22:00 from Korat to take station at the low-altitude Alpha orbit over the Gulf of Tonkin, with Frog 02 as a backup. The 17-man crews were advised in the air of the nature of the rescue mission and their role, providing MiG warning and directing USAF F-4 Phantom CAP intercepts. As Frog 01 began its climb to the higher Bravo orbit, it experienced a ruptured oil line forcing shutdown of one engine. As planned, Frog 02 became the primary aircraft when Frog 01 made an emergency landing at Danang.

The new equipment failed to function properly aboard Frog 02. The ground receivers at the command post in Danang failed to receive data and the APX-83 IFF processors would not display aboard the aircraft, despite repeated repairs. Their own radar monitors experienced excessive electronic noise and the jamming of North Vietnamese radars by nearby EKA-3B Skywarriors hindered efforts of the radar technicians to correct the problems. While unable to provide vectoring information to the F-4s escorting the mission, Frog 02 remained on station and relied on its Rivet Top voice intercept capability to provide supplementary data.

=== Disco ===
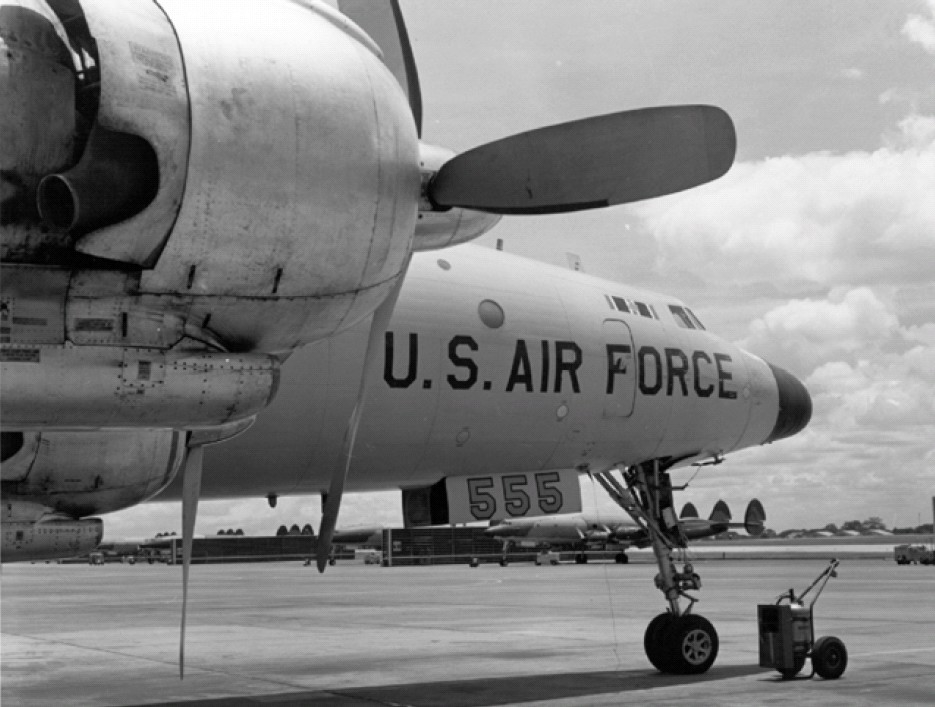
EC-121D, AF Ser. No. 53-0555 at Korat RTAFB September 1970

In October 1971, North Vietnamese MiGs, operating from forward bases opened after the end of Rolling Thunder, began a campaign to intercept Boeing B-52 Stratofortress missions over southern Laos. On 20 November, a MiG-21 launched air-to-air missiles at a B-52 that evaded by dropping flares. As a result, Warning Stars of Det. 1 returned to Korat RTAFB to provide radar support by flying the Laotian orbit again, using callsign Disco. Seven EC-121Ts, replacement aircraft for the earlier series, were based in Thailand and contained both QRC-248 and Rivet Top electronic suites.

When Operation Linebacker began on 10 May 1972, Disco was one of two principal GCI radars used by US forces, (Note: The other and preferred system was Red Crown, a USN ship in the Gulf of Tonkin.) although it continued to be handicapped by poor radio communications. In addition, its slow-turning radar limited its value as a controller of fighters during MiG engagements, while the size of USAF raids during Linebacker nearly saturated its capabilities. Improvements made in the systems since 1968 enabled the operators to distinguish MiG types and a color code system for them entered the air operations vernacular: "Red Bandits" (Mig-17s); "White Bandits" (MiG-19s); "Blue Bandits" (MiG-21s), and "Black bandits" (MiGs low on fuel).

On 6 July 1972, as the result of seven F-4 Phantoms shot down in a two-week period, a second Disco track was initiated. Flown near the former Alpha orbit over the Gulf of Tonkin, its purpose was to gain better low-altitude coverage in the Hanoi area. At the end of the month, Disco was also integrated into Teaball control center, a highly classified system established to collate all signal intelligence on North Vietnamese air activity gathered by all sources, including nonmilitary. Disco was used as a conduit through which warnings and control vectors were given, but the delay in Teaball acquiring the information and relaying it through Disco (often using an unreliable radio relay KC-135A Combat Lightning aircraft operating under callsign Luzon) (Note: Luzon was likely being jammed by friendly ECM systems.) cancelled out its value for use in "real time", and the fact that its existence was kept from US aircrews damaged its credibility. (Note: Teaball, like Rivet Top, was an NSA asset whose existence was carefully compartmentalized to prevent compromising its usefulness in the manned bomber nuclear deterrent mission.) Teaball received direct communications capability, but experienced transmission failures with frustrating frequency. Disco remained the primary backup controller, but its usefulness remained limited because it directly controlled only MiGCAP missions and could only provide its information to strike, chaff, and escort forces via the "Guard" frequency.

On 15 August 1973, Disco EC-121s flew their final combat mission and on 1 June 1974, Det.1 was permanently withdrawn from Southeast Asia. Between 1965 and 1973, the EC-121s flew 13,921 combat missions, more than 98,000 accident-free flying hours, assisted in the shoot-down of 25 MiGs, and supported the rescue of 80 downed flyers. No Big Eye, College Eye, or Disco aircraft were lost.

=== Batcat ===
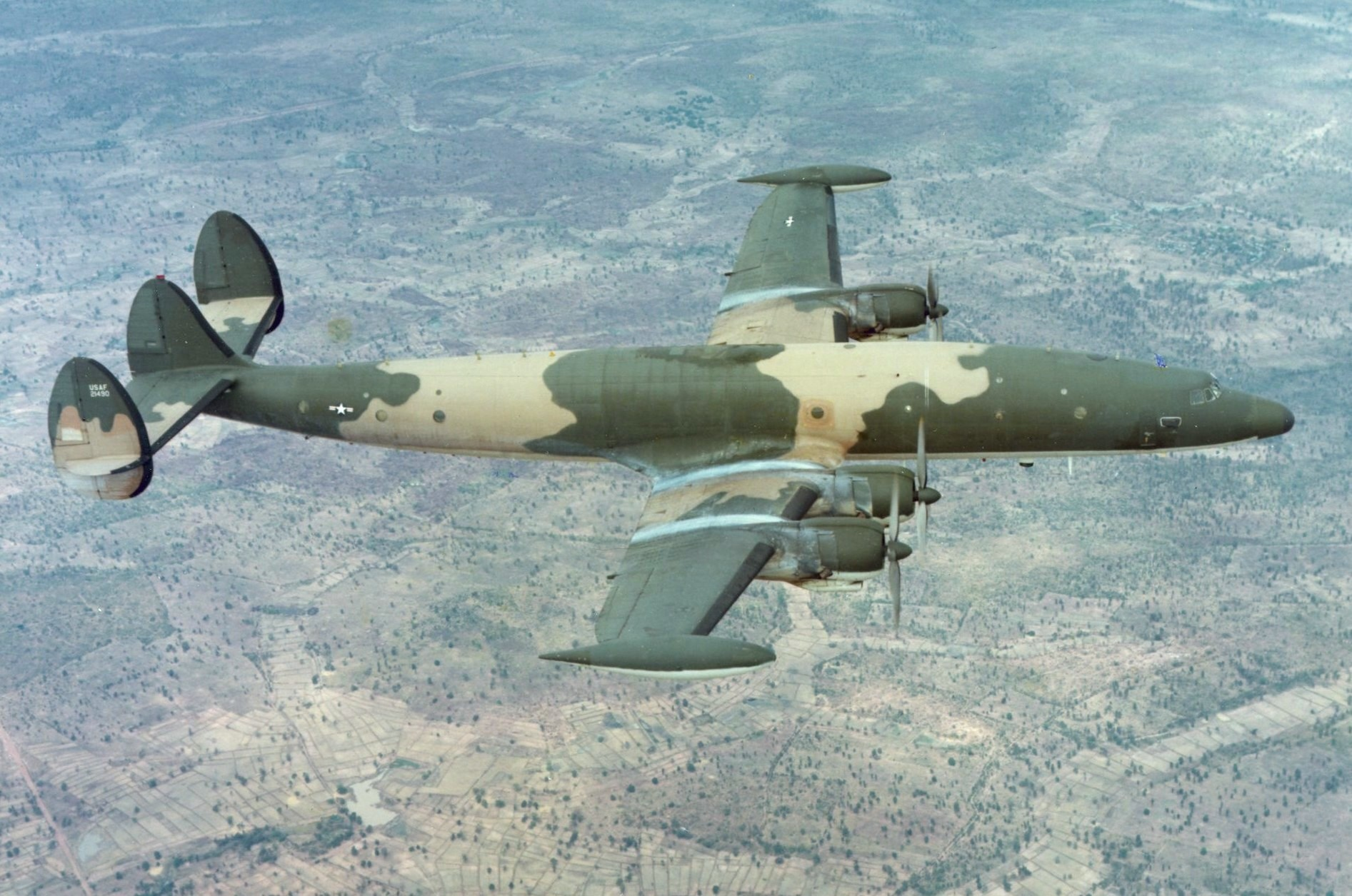
EC-121R Batcat

During the Vietnam War, some 40 EC-121s were modified from USN WV-2 and WV-3 early warning Constellations for use with ground sensors to detect enemy troop movements along the Ho Chi Minh Trail and 25 were deployed to Korat RTAFB as a part of Operation Igloo White. The resulting EC-121R configuration was nicknamed the Batcat. Two Batcats were lost during the war, with the loss of 22 crewmen, one in a takeoff accident during a thunderstorm in April 1969, the other in September 1969, in a landing accident which also killed four Thai civilians.

Batcat EC-121s were camouflaged in standard tree-color Southeast Asia scheme, while the College Eye/Disco early warning aircraft were not. BatCat missions were 18 hours in length, with 8 hours on station at one of 11 color-coded orbits used during their five-year history, three of which were over South Vietnam, six over Laos, one over Cambodia, and one over the Gulf of Tonkin.

EC-121Rs were operated by the 553d and 554th Reconnaissance Squadrons of the 553d Reconnaissance Wing, between October 1967 and December 1970, with about 20 Batcats on hand at any time. The wing activated in December 1970 and the 554th RS relocated to Nakhon Phanom RTAFB to fly QU-22 sensor monitors nicknamed "Baby Bats". Initially with 11 aircraft, the 553rd RS continued operations for another year, gradually returning aircraft and crews to the USA. The final Batcat mission was in December 1971. The last remaining administrative and support personnel returned to Otis AFB in January 1972.

== Variants ==
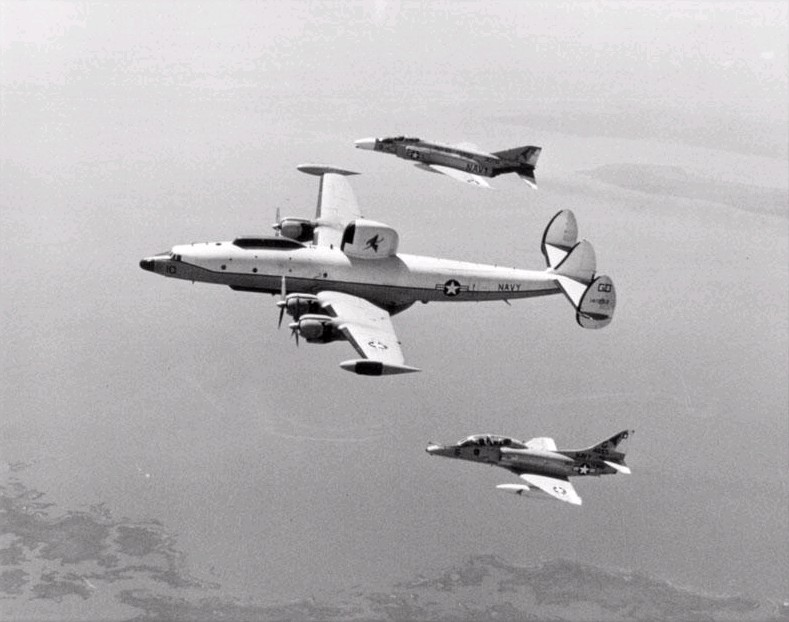
VAQ-33 NC-121K in 1973, flanked by F-4B Phantom and EA-4F Skyhawk

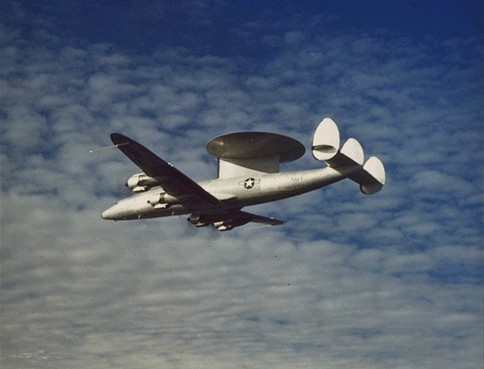
WV-2E experimental aircraft with a rotodome

=== USN variants ===
- WV-1. 2 prototypes, L-749A Constellation, designated PO-1W before 1952
- EC-121K (WV-2). Main USN variant, designated PO-2W before 1952; 244 ordered, 142 produced (the rest to USAF).
- JC-121K. One modified EC-121K used as a US Army avionics testbed
- NC-121K. Unknown number modified as special mission aircraft
- YEC-121K. One modified avionics testbed
- EC-121L (WV-2E). One modified WV-2, testbed for rotating radar dome with an AN/APS-70 radar
- EC-121M (WV-2Q). ELINT collection variant, 13 modified WV-2
- WC-121N (WV-3. Weather reconnaissance variant, 8 modified WV-2
- EC-121P. Unknown number modified from EC-121K as anti-submarine variant
- JEC-121P. 3 EC-121P used by the USAF
- XW2V-1: Proposed naval development with new features such as 4 Allison T56-A8 turboprop engines, L-1649A Starliner wings and air-to-air missiles for defense. None built; was designated L-084 due to the large differences from its predecessors.

=== USAF variants ===
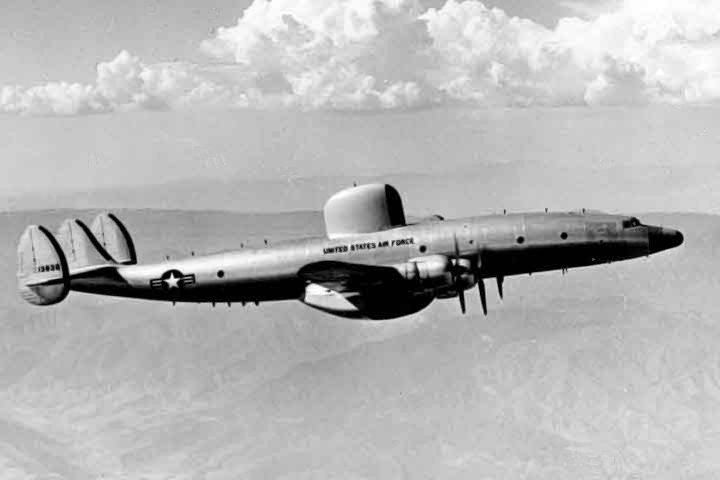
The first USAF RC-121C, 1955.

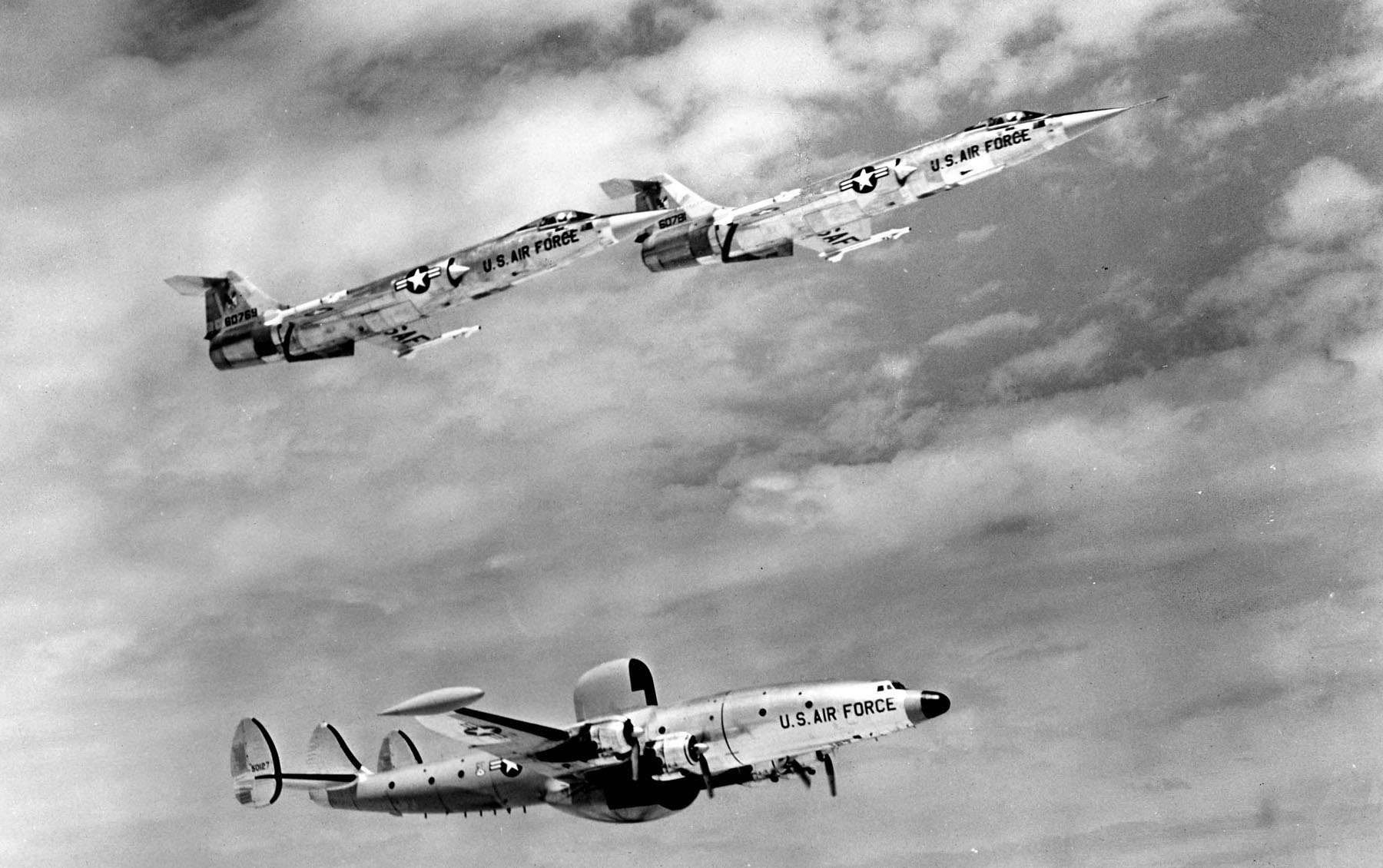
USAF RC-121D 53-0128 with F-104 Starfighters.

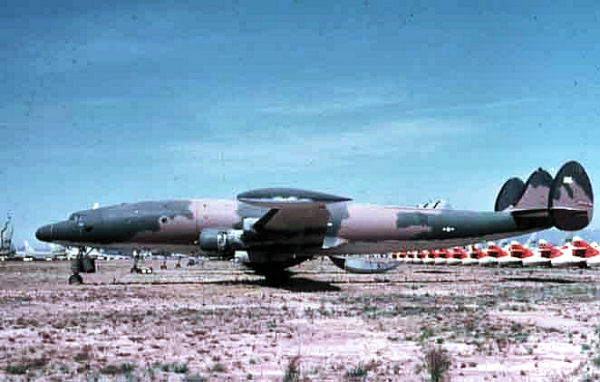
A former EC-121R Batcat at AMARC, Davis-Monthan AFB, Arizona.

- RC-121C: 10 produced, initial USAF variant
- JC-121C: 2 converted from C-121C and 1 TC-121C as avionics testbeds
- TC-121C: 9 RC-121C modified before 1962 as crew trainers
- EC-121D: 73 produced 1953–55 as main USAF variant and 1 converted from C-121C, originally designated RC-121D
- EC-121D Quick Look: 1 testbed for QRC-248 IFF transponder interrogator
- EC-121H: 42 USAF upgrades in 1962, 35 EC-121Ds and 7 WV-2s transferred from the Navy
- EC-121J: 2 USAF EC-121D modified with upgraded electronics
- EC-121M Rivet Top: 1 EC-121D testbed for Rivet Gym cryptologic linguist electronics suite, originally designated EC-121K
- EC-121Q: 4 EC-121Ds modified with upgraded electronics for USAF Gold Digger missions
- EC-121R: 30 EC-121K / EC-121P transferred to USAF in 1966–1967 and converted to Batcat sensor signal processor
- EC-121S: 5 converted for Pennsylvania Air National Guard from USAF C-121 transports
- EC-121T: Final USAF variant. A total of 22 -T's were converted from 15 EC-121Ds and 7 EC-121Hs.

== Operators ==
United States

=== USAF ===
==== Active duty ====
- 551st AEWCW – Otis AFB, Massachusetts
  - 960th AEWCS
  - 961st AEWCS
  - 962d AEWCS
- 552d AEWCW – McClellan AFB, California
  - 963d AEWCS
  - 964th AEWCS
  - 965th AEWCS
- 553d RW – Korat RTAFB, Thailand
  - 553d RS
  - 554th RS
- 966th AEWCS – McCoy AFB, Florida
- Det 1, 20th ADS – Homestead AFB, Florida

==== AFRES ====
- 79th AEWCS (AFRES) – Homestead AFB, Florida

==== ANG ====
- 193d TEWS (PA ANG) – Olmsted Air Force Base, later renamed Harrisburg Air National Guard Base, Pennsylvania

=== USN ===
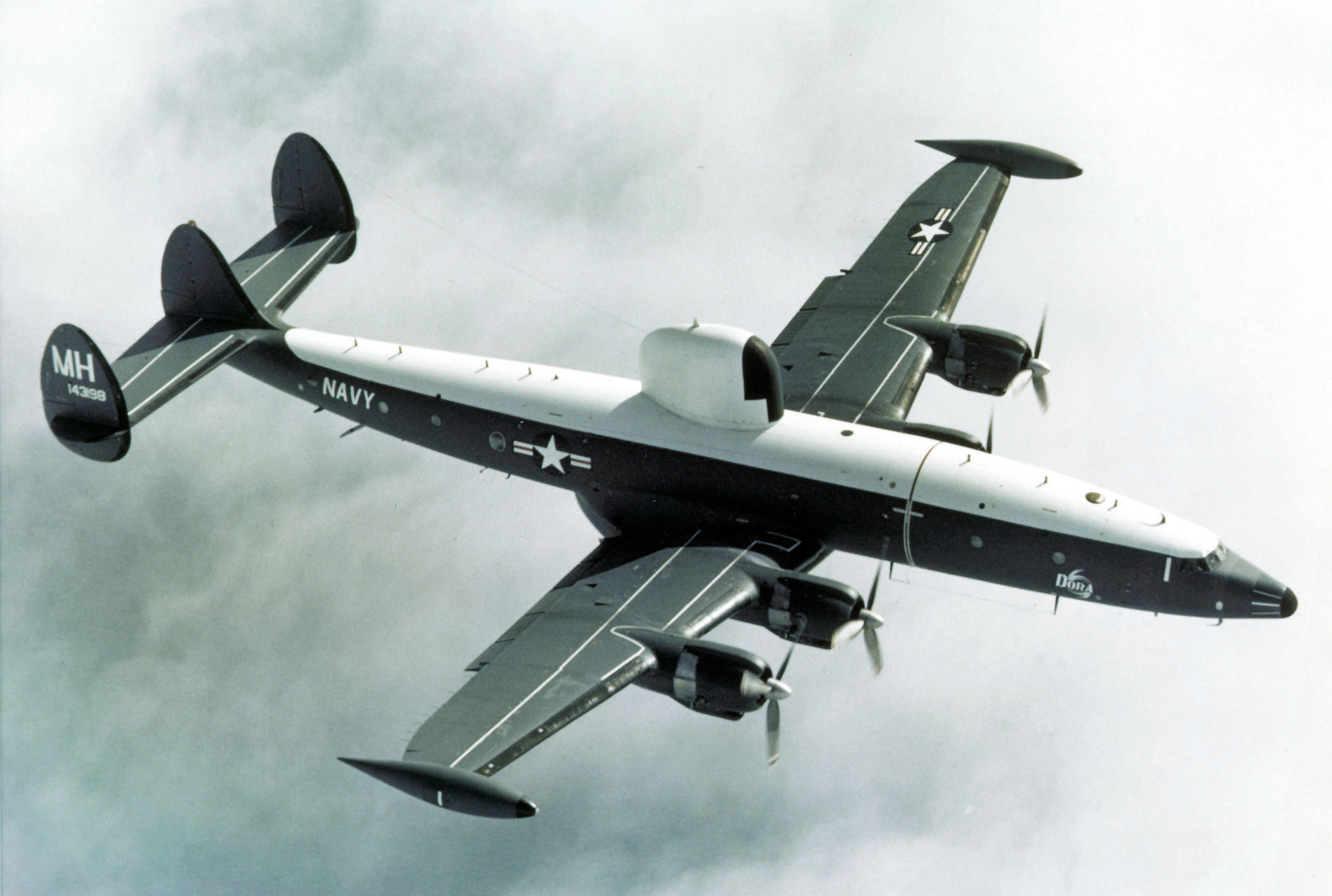
WC-121N of VW-4 Hurricane Hunters 1967

- AEW Wing Atlantic – NAS Patuxent River, Maryland
  - VXN-8 – NAS Patuxent River, Maryland
  - VW-2 (BarLant) -NAS Patuxent River, Maryland
  - VW-4 ("Hurricane Hunters") – NAS Jacksonville, Florida
  - VW-11 (BarLant) – NS Argentia, Newfoundland / NAS Patuxent River, Maryland
  - VW-13 (BarLant) – NAS Patuxent River, Maryland / NS Argentia, Newfoundland
  - VW-15 (BarLant) – NAS Argentia, Newfoundland / NAS Patuxent River, Maryland
  - AEWTULANT – NAS Patuxent River, Maryland
  - Naval CIC Officers School, later Training Squadron EIGHTY SIX (VT-86) – NAS Glynco, Georgia
- AEW Wing Pacific – NAS Barbers Point, Hawaii
  - VW-1 ("Typhoon Trackers") – NAS Agana, Guam
  - VW-3 ("Typhoon Chasers") – NAS Agana, Guam
  - VW-12 (BarPac) – NAS Barbers Point, Hawaii
  - VW-14 (BarPac) – NAS Barbers Point, Hawaii
  - VW-16 (BarPac) – NAS Barbers Point, Hawaii
  - AewBarsRon 2 (Service/Support) – NAS Barbers Point, Hawaii
  - MatRon 1 (Support) – NAS Barbers Point, Hawaii
  - AewBarRonPac (amalgamation of VW-12, VW-14, and AEWBarRon 2) – NAS Barbers Point, Hawaii
- VQ-1 – NAF Atsugi, Japan
- VQ-2 – NS Rota, Spain
- VAQ-33 – NAS Norfolk, Virginia / NAS Key West, Florida
- VX-6 – NAS Quonset Point, Rhode Island

== Accidents and incidents ==
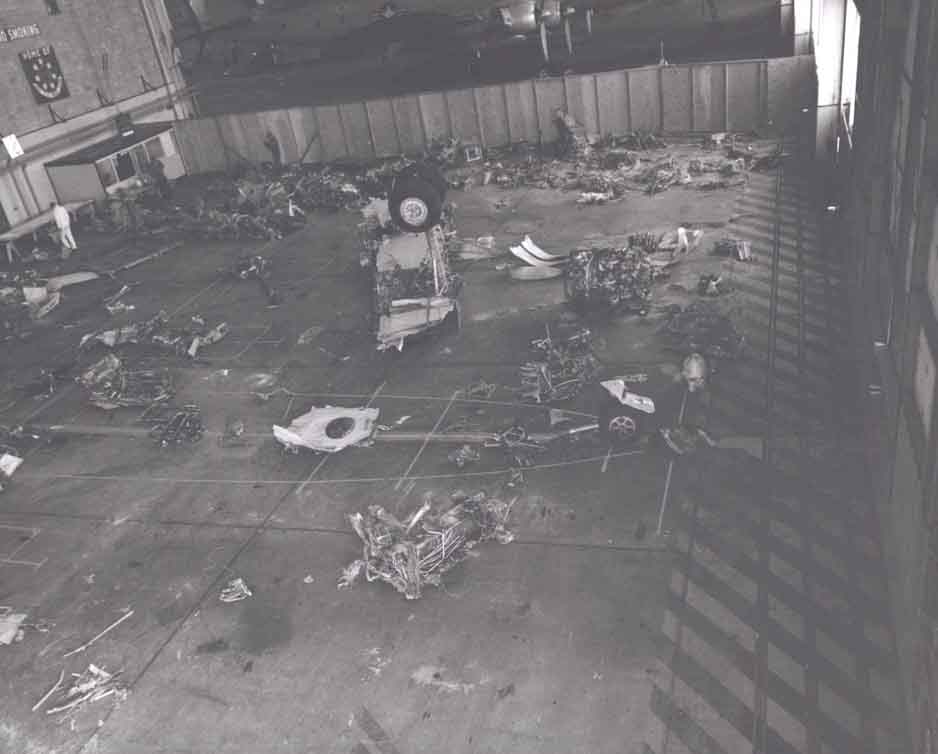
Wreckage of the 25 April 1967 crash, in a hangar after recovery

A total of 20 Navy EC-121s were destroyed in accidents, with 113 aircrew deaths:

- 15x WV-2/EC-121K; 3x WV-2Q/EC-121M and 2x WV-3/WC-121N

Another unarmed EC-121M was destroyed in one-sided combat. In April 1969, North Korean Air Force MiG-21 fighter-interceptors shot down an EC-121 in international airspace off the country's east coast, killing all of the crew of 31 on board.

The USAF had a total of 11 Warning Stars destroyed in accidents, killing 66 aircrew:

- 2x RC-121C/TC-121C; 2x RC-121D; 3x EC-121H; 3x EC-121R and 1x EC-121T

Three EC-121Hs from the 551st AEWCW were lost—on 11 July 1965, 11 November 1966 and 25 April 1967—resulting in a total of 50 deaths (16, 19, and 15, respectively), including wing commander Col James P. Lyle in the 1967 crash.

The two Batcat EC-121R crashes resulted in 22 killed.

== Surviving aircraft ==
EC-121T

On Display

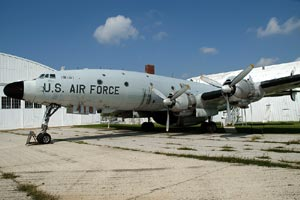
N4257U (AF Ser No. 52-3418) on display Combat Air Museum Topeka, KS

- AF Ser. No. 52-3418 – on display at the Combat Air Museum at Forbes Field (former Forbes AFB) in Topeka, Kansas. The aircraft was delivered to USAF in October 1954 as an RC-121D and redesignated an EC-121D in 1962. It was converted to an EC-121T, but the upper radome has been removed.

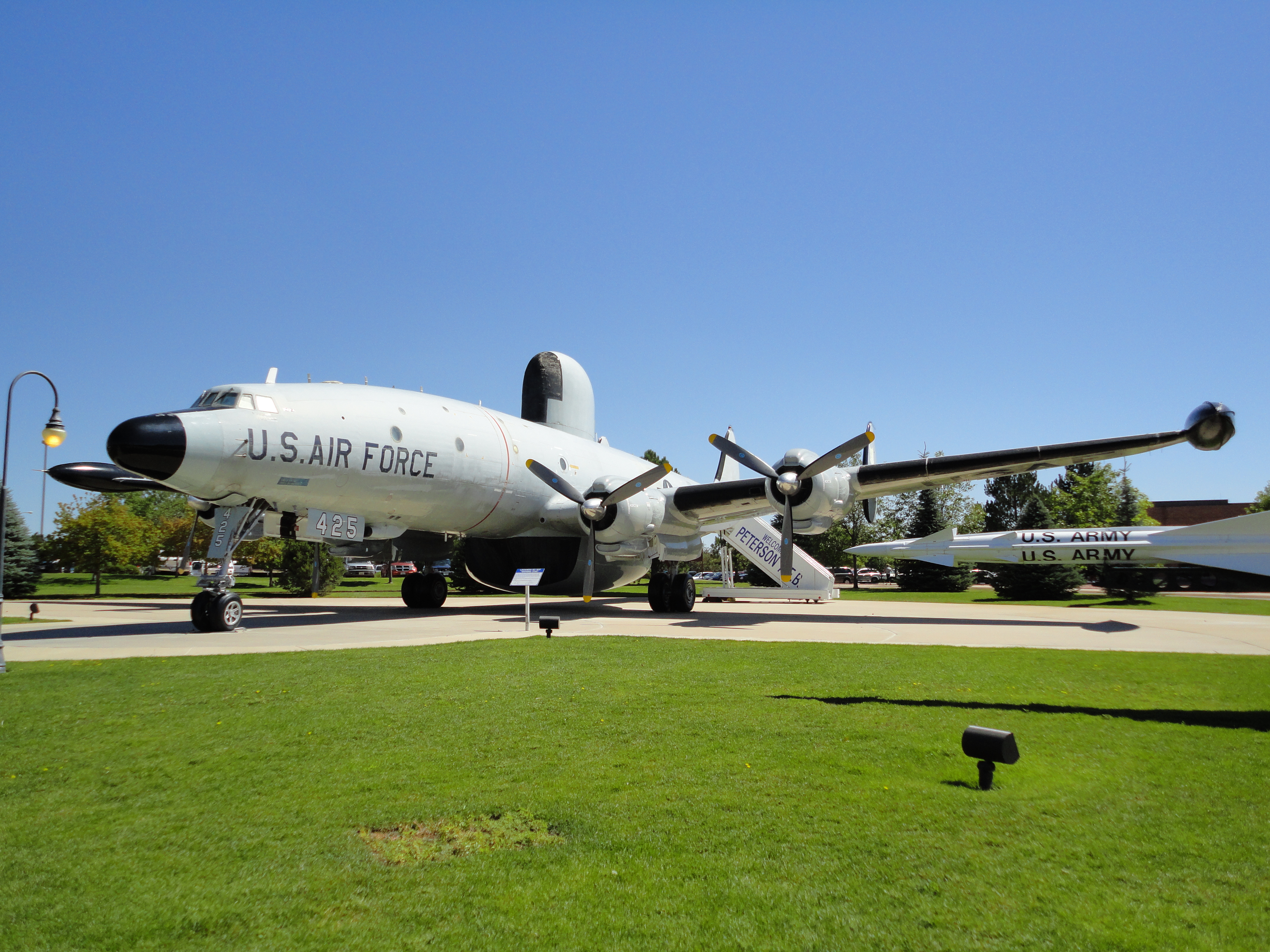
EC-121T AF Serial No. 52-3425 on display Peterson AFB Colorado

- AF Ser. No. 52-3425 – on display at the Peterson Air and Space Museum at Peterson Space force base in Colorado Springs, Colorado. Previously assigned to the 966th AEWCS at McCoy AFB, Florida and then the 79th AEWCS at Homestead AFB, Florida. It was delivered to Peterson AFB in October 1978.
- AF Ser. No. 53-0548 – on display at the Yanks Air Museum in Chino, California. It was stored at Camarillo Airport (former Oxnard AFB) while the Yanks Air Museum was working to get it restored and to complete FAA paperwork for a ferry flight. The final maintenance efforts by Yanks Air Museum Restoration Director Frank Wright included a rebuild of engine #4 in early January 2012. 53-0548 departed Camarillo at 12:10PM on Saturday, 14 January 2012 for the 90-minute flight to Chino, where it will become a static display.
- AF Ser. No. 53-0552 – on display at Tinker AFB, Oklahoma.
- AF Ser. No. 53-0554 – on display at the Pima Air & Space Museum, adjacent to Davis-Monthan AFB in Tucson, Arizona.

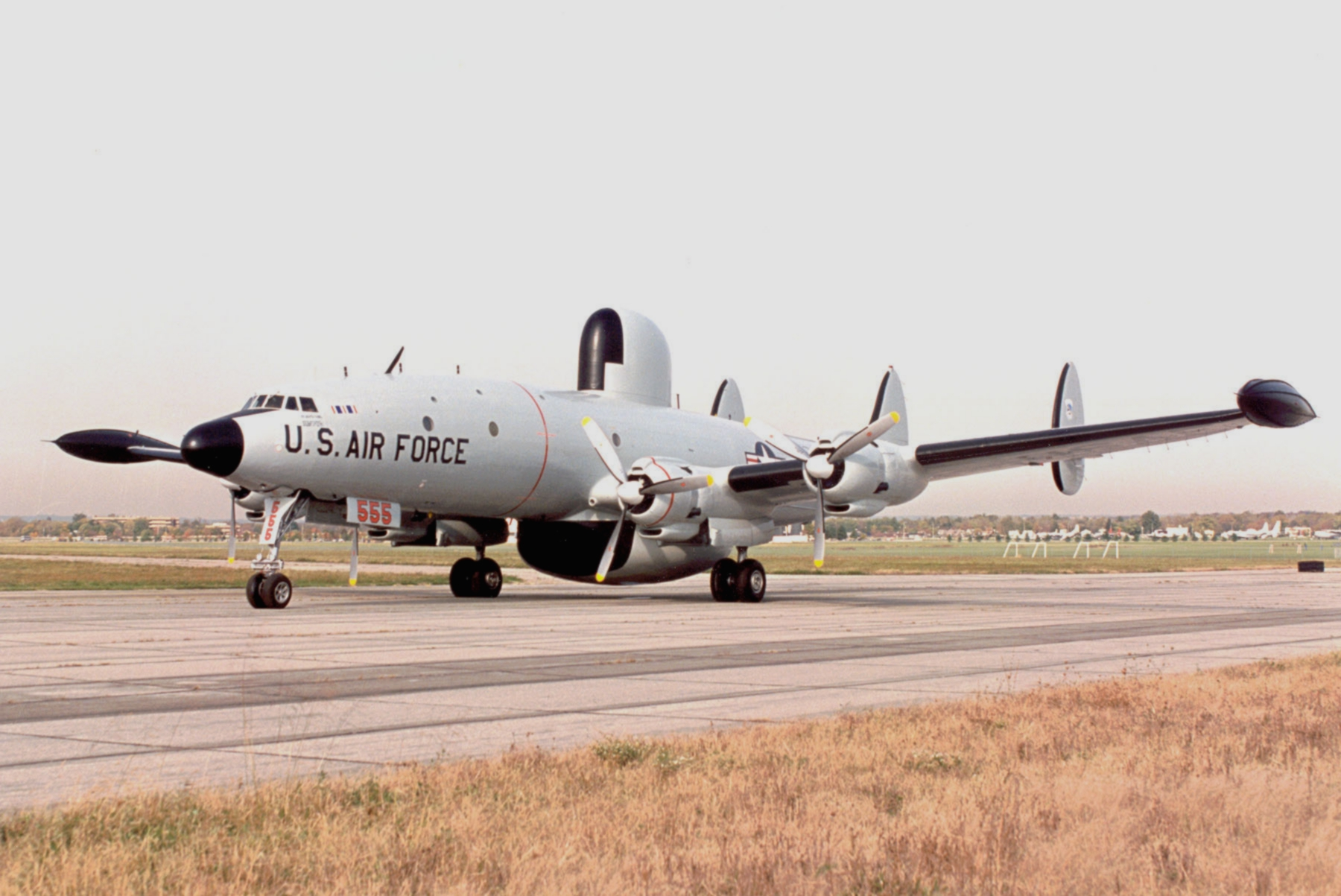
College Eye EC-121D (AF Ser. No. 53-0555) National Museum of the United States Air Force

- AF Ser. No. 53-0555 – on display at the National Museum of the United States Air Force at Wright-Patterson Air Force Base near Dayton, Ohio. The College Eye EC-121D is fully restored and on display indoors. This aircraft was nicknamed "Triple Nickel" because of its serial number (53-555). On 24 October 1967, while operating over the Gulf of Tonkin, it guided a U.S. fighter by radar into position to destroy a North Vietnamese Air Force enemy fighter aircraft, a MiG-21. This was the first time a weapons controller aboard an airborne radar aircraft had ever directed a successful attack on an enemy aircraft. "Triple Nickel" was retired to the USAF Museum in 1971.
- AF Ser. No. 52-3417 – on display at the Castle Air Museum,Atwater, Ca.

EC-121T

On Display

- BuNo 137890 – on display outside 552d Air Control Wing Headquarters, the home of E-3 AWACS operations for the USAF, at Tinker Air Force Base, in Oklahoma City, Oklahoma. The aircraft is one of two Warning Stars displayed in the markings as AF Serial Number 53-0552.
- BuNo 141297 – on display at the Museum of Aviation at Robins Air Force Base, Georgia. It was flown to the museum in 1987 for display.
- BuNo 141309 – on display as AF Serial Number 53-0552 at the Aerospace Museum of California at the former McClellan AFB, California. This is one of two Warning Stars painted as 53-0552.
- BuNo 141311 – awaiting restoration at the Yankee Air Museum, Belleville, MI. Previously at Octave Chanute Aerospace Museum, Rantoul, Illinois.
- BuNo 143221 – on display at the National Naval Aviation Museum at Naval Air Station Pensacola in Pensacola, Florida. The aircraft was acquired in flyable condition in 1973 from Training Squadron 86 (VT-86) at NAS Glynco, Georgia pending the closure of NAS Glynco and the squadron's relocation to NAS Pensacola. It is currently on display at the Sherman Field flight line annex of the museum.

== Specifications (WV-2/EC-121D) ==
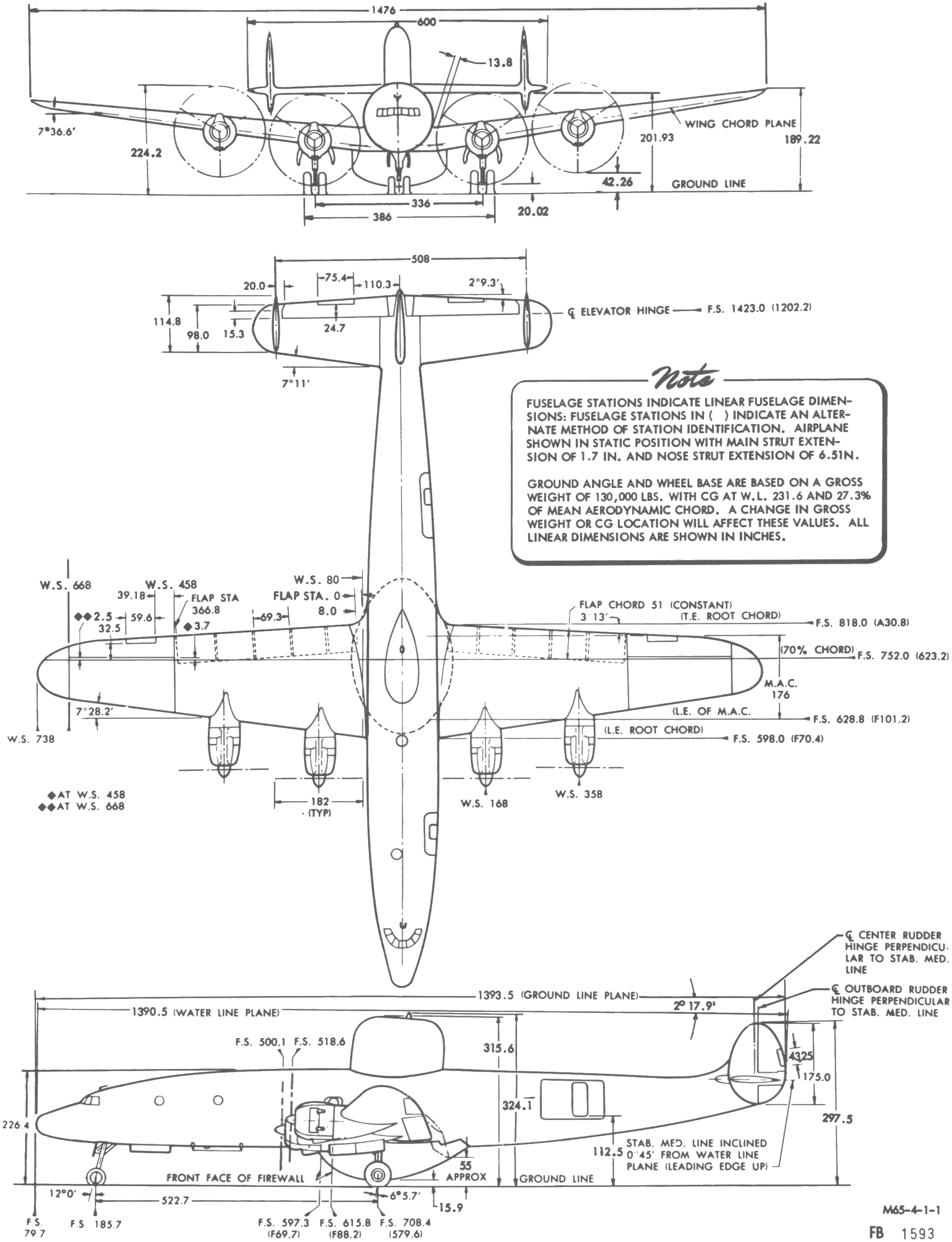
3-view line drawing of the Lockheed RC-121C Warning Star

Data from

General characteristics

- Crew: typically six flight crew, 11–25 radar crew
- Length: 116 ft 2 in (35.40 m)
- Wingspan: 126 ft 2 in (38.45 m)
- Height: 24 ft 9 in (7.54 m)
- Wing area: 1,650 sq ft (153.27 m^{2})
- Empty weight: 69,210 lb (31,387 kg)
- Max takeoff weight: 143,000 lb (65,000 kg)
- Powerplant: 4 × Wright R-3350-34 turbo compound 18-cylinder supercharged radial engines, 3,400 hp (2,536 kW) each

Performance

- Maximum speed: 299 mph (481 km/h, 260 kn)
- Cruise speed: 255 mph (410 km/h, 222 kn)
- Range: 4,250 mi (6,843 km, 3,700 nmi)
- Service ceiling: 25,000 ft (7,620 m)
- Rate of climb: 960 ft/min (4.87 m/s)

== See also ==
- Lockheed Constellation variants

Related development

- Lockheed Constellation – Family of US airliners with 4 piston engines, 1943
- L-049 Constellation – US airliner with 4 piston engines, 1943
- C-69 Constellation – Early military version of the Constellation
- L-649 Constellation – US airliner with 4 piston engines, 1946
- L-749 Constellation – First version of Constellation with the ability to cross the Atlantic non-stop
- L-1049 Super Constellation – US airliner with 4 piston engines, 1951
- C-121/R7V Constellation – Military transport version of Constellation
- L-1649A Starliner – US airliner with 4 piston engines, 1956

Aircraft of comparable role, configuration, and era

- Boeing E-3 Sentry – Airborne early warning and control aircraft based on Boeing 707 airframe
- Fairey Gannet AEW.3 – British airborne early warning aircraft
- Tupolev Tu-126 – Russian airborne early warning and control aircraft

Related lists

- List of Lockheed aircraft
- List of Lockheed Constellation operators
- List of military electronics of the United States
