= VAQ-35 =

- Active: 14 August 1991 – 7 October 1993
- Country: United States
- Branch: United States Navy
- Role: Electronic warfare aircraft
- Part of: Inactive
- Nickname(s): Greywolves

Aircraft flown
- Electronic warfare: EA-6B Prowler

VAQ-35, nicknamed the Greywolves, was a short-lived Tactical Electronic Warfare Squadron of the United States Navy. The squadron was officially established by the Chief of Naval Operations on 14 August 1991, but had actually been operating since June. Most of its equipment and personnel came from the VAQ-142 Grim Watchdogs, a fleet EA-6B Prowler squadron which had stood down on 1 April. VAQ-35 joined VAQ-33 and VAQ-34, the other electronic aggressor squadrons of the Fleet Electronic Warfare Support Group in their mission of providing training for fleet radar operators in countering radar jamming and deception. The squadron also assisted with electronic warfare evaluations for research and development, and in developing electronic warfare tactics and countertactics.

When the Navy made a budgetary decision to transfer the electronic aggressor mission to the Navy Reserve, VAQ-35 was destined to have a short life. On 7 October 1993, the squadron was disestablished at NAS Whidbey Island, Washington. In their two years of operation, the Greywolves made over 42 deployments to over 16 locations, including Bermuda, Hawaii, and Puerto Rico.

== See also ==
- History of the United States Navy
- List of inactive United States Navy aircraft squadrons
