= VAQ-34 =

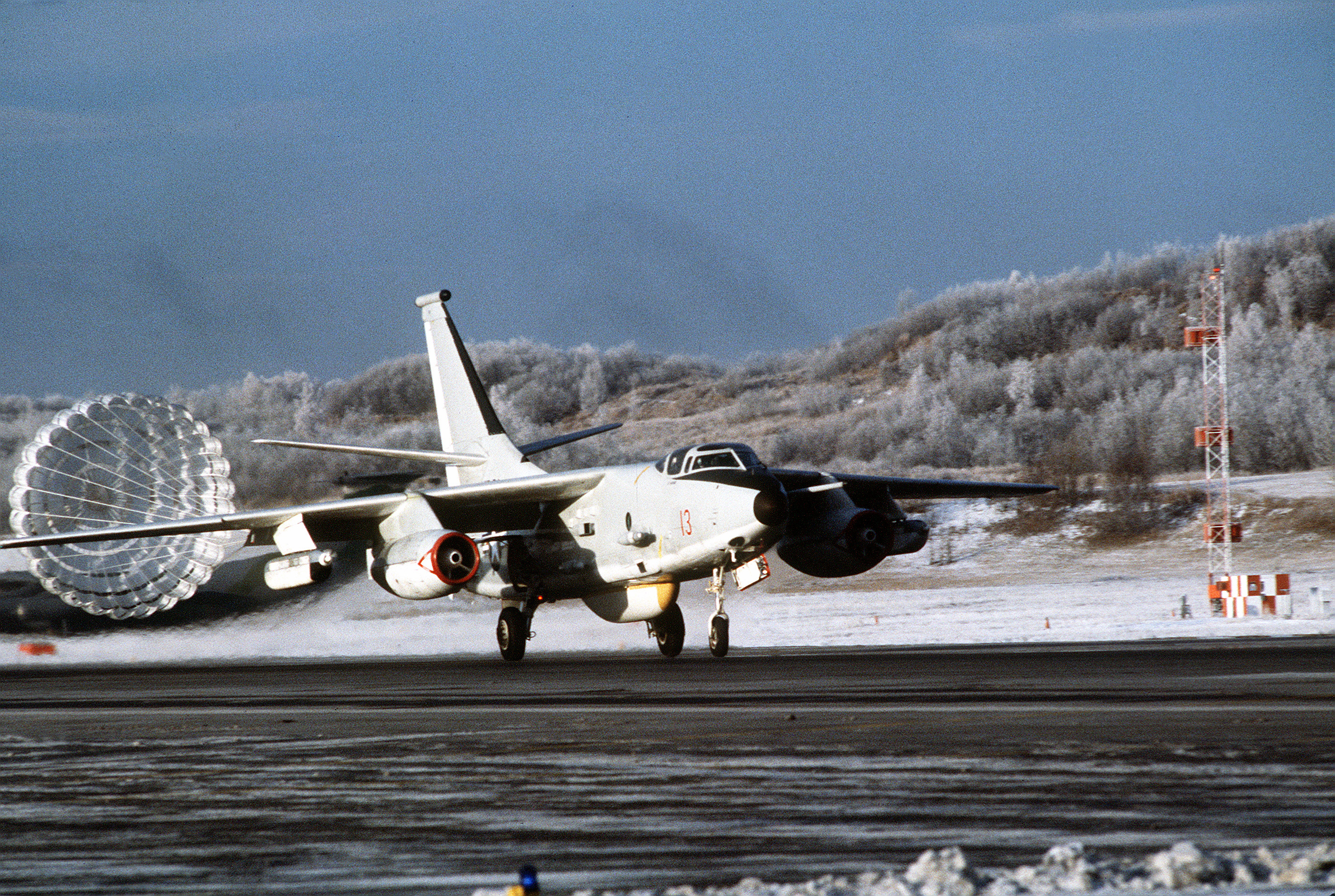
- VAQ-34 ERA-3B lands during the U.S. 3rd Fleet North Pacific Exercise at Elmendorf Air Force Base, Alaska, on 8 November 1987
- Active: 1 March 1983 – 5 October 1993
- Country: United States
- Branch: United States Navy
- Role: Electronic warfare aircraft
- Part of: Inactive
- Nickname(s): Flashbacks

Aircraft flown
- Attack: ERA-3B Skywarrior; KA-3B Skywarrior; EA-3B Skywarrior; VA-3B Skywarrior; TA-7C/EA-7L/A-7E Corsair II; F/A-18A Hornet

VAQ-34, callsign Flashbacks, was a Tactical Electronic Warfare Squadron of the U.S. Navy. It was established on 1 March 1983 at the Pacific Missile Test Center, Point Mugu, California, under the Fleet Electronic Warfare Support Group. The squadron was formed to provide realistic training for ship crews to counter Soviet electronic and cruise-missile threats, and was modeled after its East Coast counterpart, VAQ-33.

The squadron's activities included support of major fleet exercises, including training in antiair warfare, electronic countermeasures and electronic counter-counter-measures, electronic surveillance, electronic emissions control, and training in the face of simulated missile attacks.

Establishing the squadron required the reclamation of aircraft and other equipment from various untraditional sources. A team from Naval Air Station Alameda retrieved four RA-3B Skywarriors from the aircraft boneyard at Davis-Monthan Air Force Base in Arizona, then did the work to make them acceptable for squadron use. They later converted them to ERA-3Bs to give the squadron the most realistic hostile electronic training possible. Another Skywarrior, this one in better condition, went more directly from the boneyard to the newly-forming squadron. It allowed aircrew and maintenance training to begin while waiting for the ERA-3Bs to be delivered, not to mention serving as an airborne tanker. Six TA-7C Corsair IIs were also transferred to VAQ-34 from other assets in the fleet. They were later converted to EA-7Ls. In 1991, the ERA-3B and EA-7L aircraft were retired or transferred, and the squadron soon acquired eight F/A-18A Hornet strike fighters fitted with missile simulators, threat detectors, jamming equipment, and chaff dispensers.

When Rosemary Bryant Mariner assumed command in 1990, VAQ-34 became the first U.S. Military aviation squadron to be commanded by a woman. In June 1991 it moved to NAS Lemoore, California. In 1993 the Navy transferred the electronic aggressor role to the Navy Reserve, leading to VAQ-34's disestablishment on 5 October 1993.

== See also ==
- History of the United States Navy
- List of inactive United States Navy aircraft squadrons
- VAQ-33
- VAQ-35
- FEWSG
- VAQ-34 - Tactical Electronic Warfare Squadron Three-Four (VAQ-34) web page
