= Fleet Electronic Warfare Support Group =

The Fleet Electronic Warfare Support Group's (FEWSG) mission as part of the US Navy was to provide electronic warfare simulation in a controlled environment during fleet exercises to help operators deal with EW threats, VAQ-33, VAQ-34 and VAQ-35 were the primary electronic aggressor squadrons to provide these fleet services flying the ERA-3B, EA-4F, EA-6A, EA-6B, EA-7L, EF-4B, EP-3J and NC-121K. FEWSG also operated their own aircraft under contract, most notably EB-47E, NKC-135A and an EC-24A. FEWSG was joined with the Fleet Deception Group Atlantic in May 1992 to form the Fleet Tactical Readiness Group (FTRG). The FTRG had an inventory of EW jammers and threat simulators for realistic training for operators.
