= Air Force Three =

US aircraft carrying the secretary of state

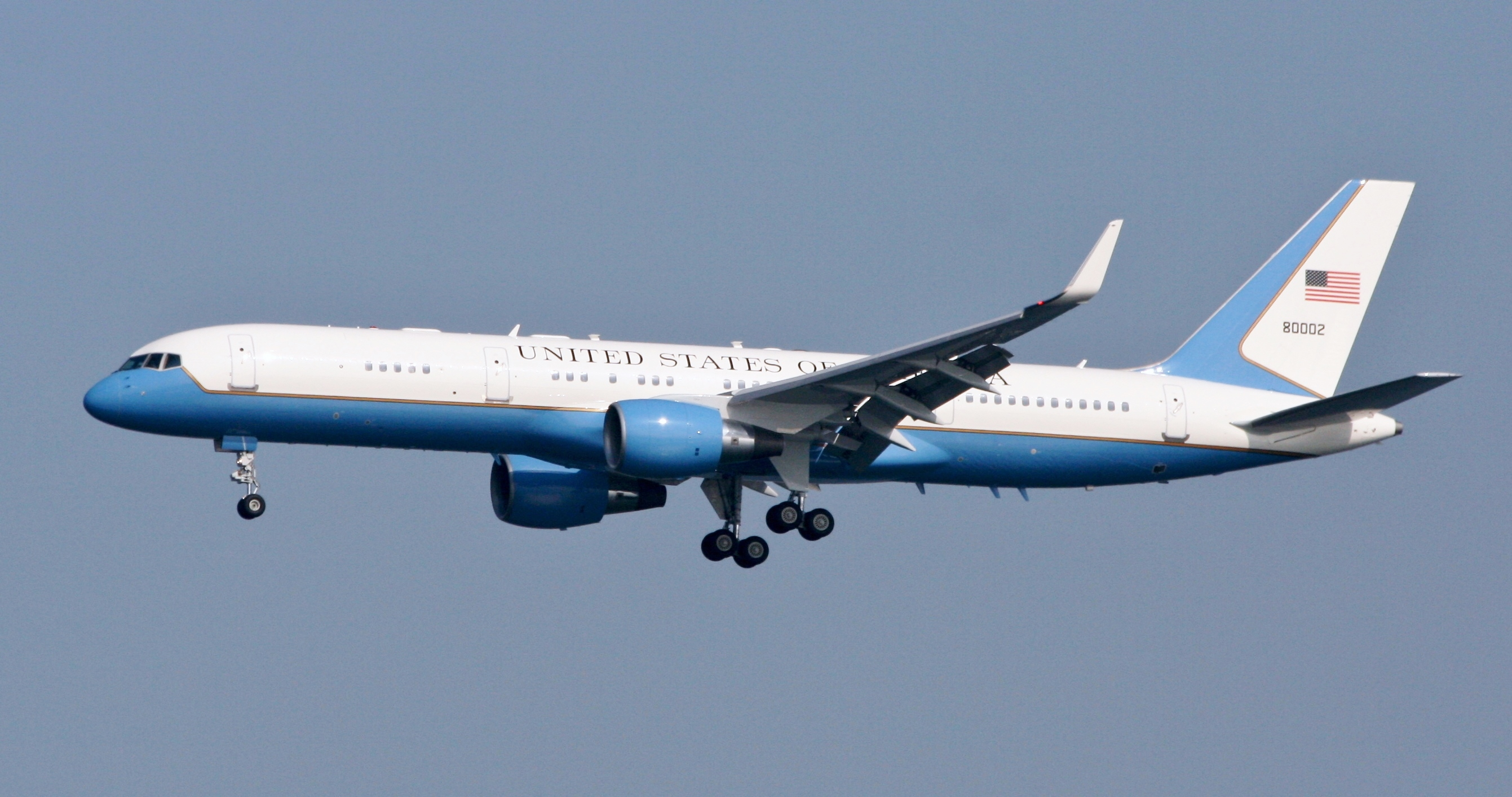
The Boeing C-32, a variant of the 757, is the usual transportation for the U.S. secretary of state.

Air Force Three is the air traffic control designated call sign held by any United States Air Force aircraft carrying the United States secretary of state, but not the president of the United States or vice president. The term is often associated with the Boeing C-32, a modified 757 which is most commonly used as the secretary of state's transport.

== History ==
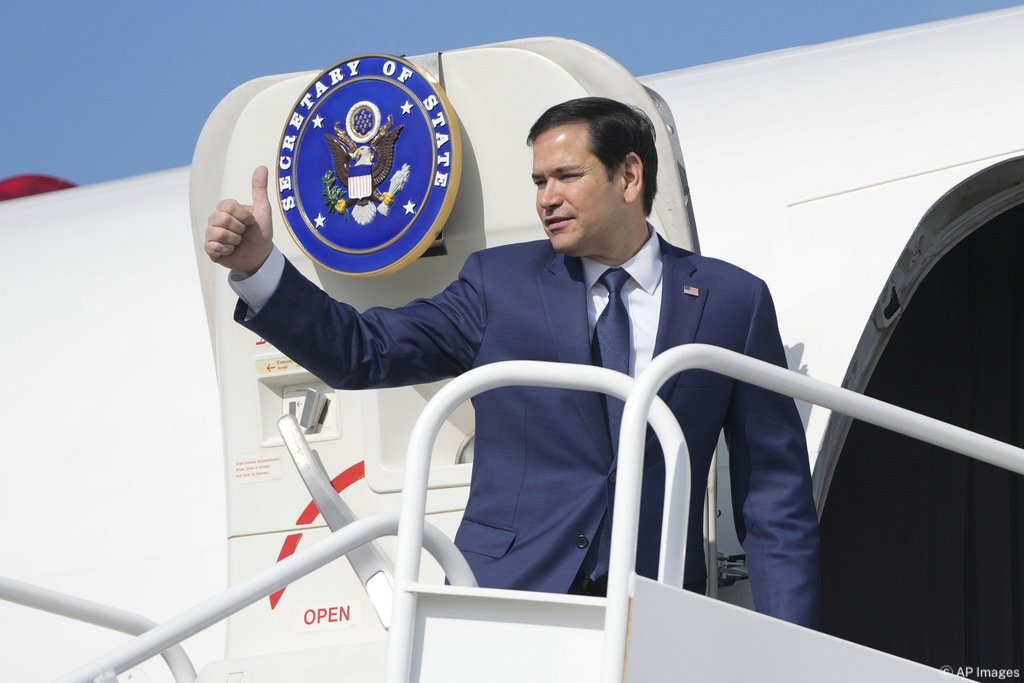
Secretary of State Marco Rubio boarding Air Force Three, February 2025

In July 1955, John Foster Dulles became the first Secretary of State to fly internationally on an American government airplane, travelling aboard Columbine III to Geneva, Switzerland, alongside President Dwight D. Eisenhower.

From the tenures of Henry Kissinger to Warren Christopher, the secretary of state's official aircraft was a modified Boeing 707.

The C-20 Gulfstream was used as an alternate Air Force Three during the tenure of Secretary George Shultz.

During James Baker's tenure, the secretary of state flew aboard a VC-137C SAM 26000, after the presidential plane was upgraded in 1990.

Since the tenure of Secretary Madeleine Albright, the Boeing C-32 has been the primary aircraft of the secretary of state.

During the tenure of Hillary Clinton as Secretary of State, Air Force Three flew to 112 countries, the most of any Secretary of State in U.S. history.

== Design ==
Aircraft allocated for use by the secretary of state and senior executives authorized to travel under the Special Air Mission designation operated by the 89th Airlift Wing can be distinguished from the distinctive Raymond Loewy Air Force One livery by the lack of the steel blue cheatline and cap over the cockpit.

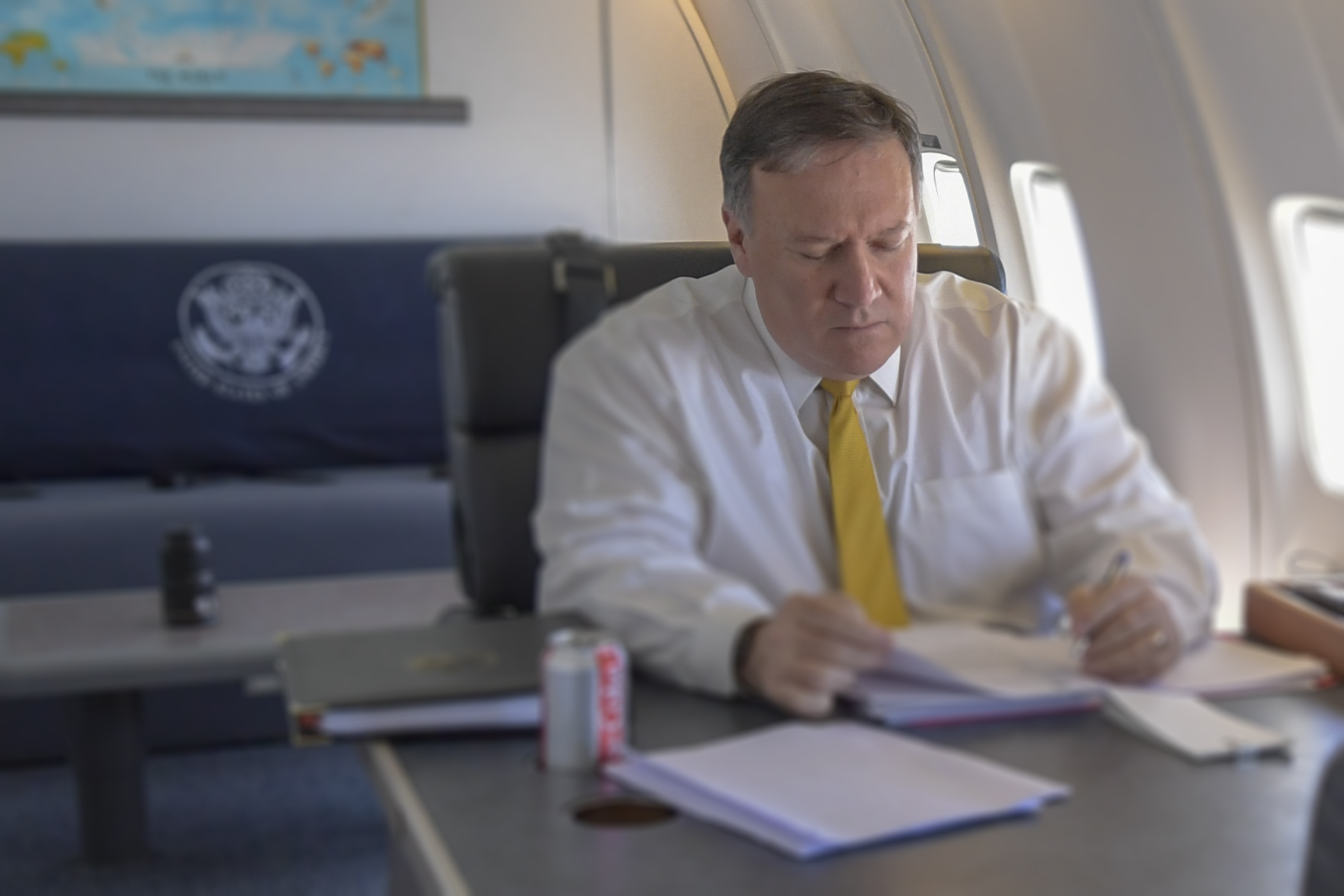
Secretary Mike Pompeo working abroad Air Force Three in April 2018

Throughout the Obama, Trump, and Biden administrations, the interior of Air Force Three was slowly refitted with more luxurious accommodations, at a cost of $16 million per aircraft.

== Incidents ==
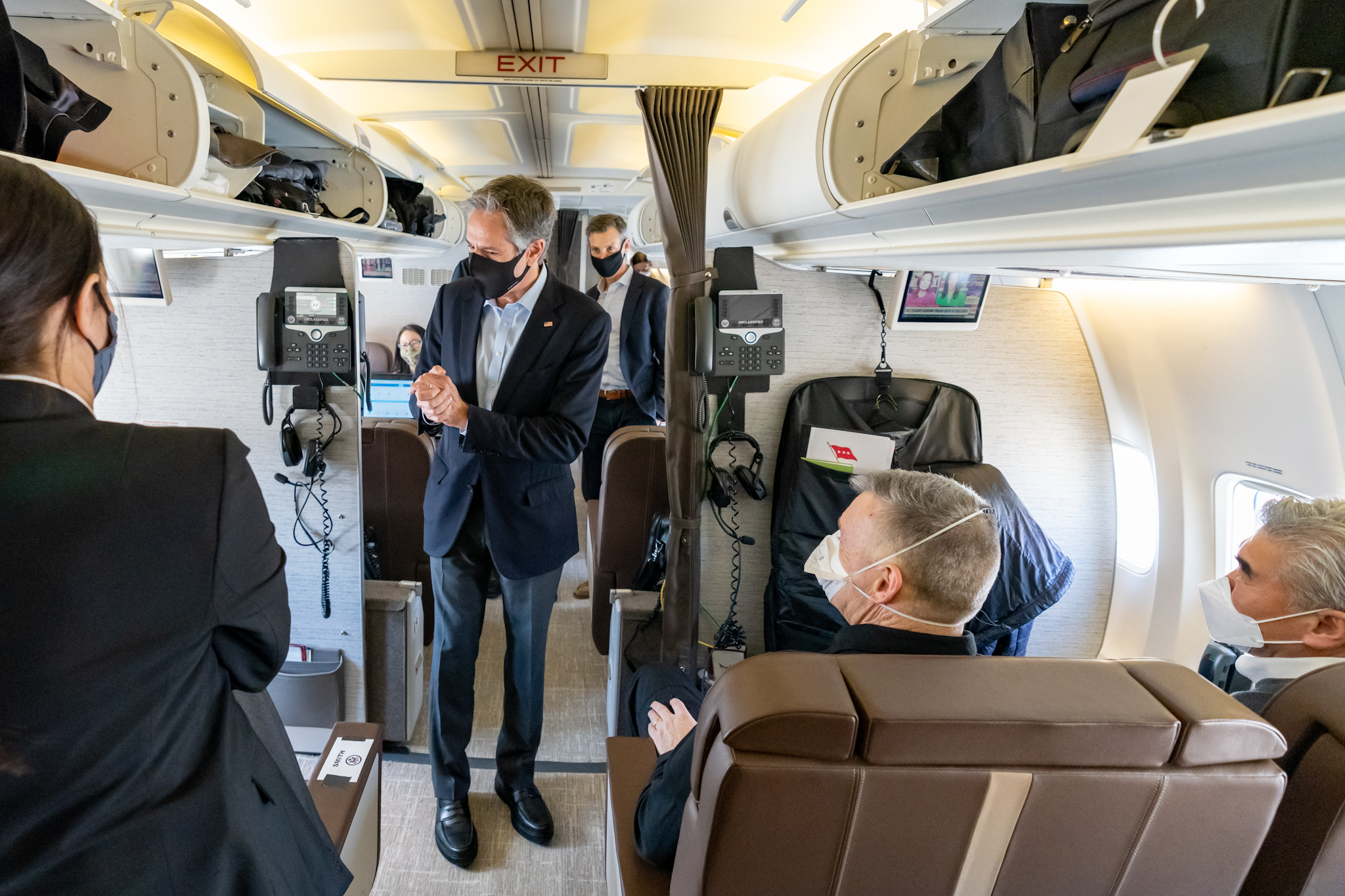
Secretary Antony Blinken aboard an upgraded Air Force Three in 2021

In August 2014, Secretary John Kerry's plane broke down in Honolulu, Hawaii, due to an electrical problem. In October 2014, Secretary Kerry's plane broke down in Vienna, Austria.

In January 2024, Secretary Antony Blinken was required to change planes in Davos due to a "critical failure" from an oxygen leak.

In February 2025, Air Force Three returned to Washington, D.C. after experiencing a "mechanical problem" while carrying Secretary Marco Rubio en route to Munich.

== See also ==
- Air Force One
- Air Force Two
- 1254th Air Transport Wing
- 89th Airlift Wing
