= 1254th Air Transport Wing =

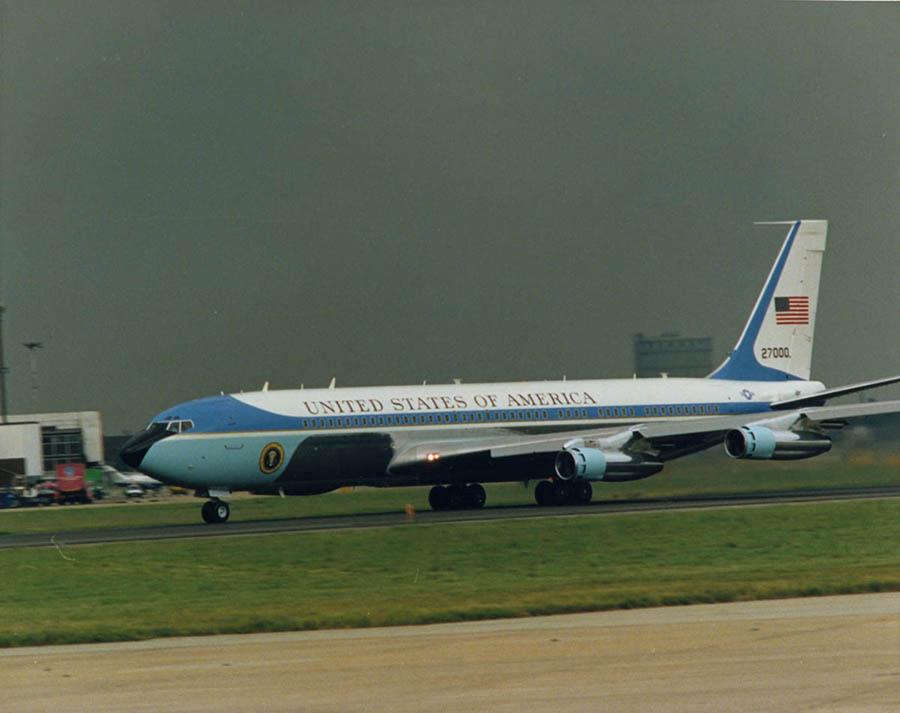
- USAF VC-137C 72-7000. The VC-137 was the first plane to be widely known as Air Force One
- Active: 1948–1966
- Country: United States
- Branch: United States Air Force
- Role: Very Important Person Transport
- Size: Wing (military aviation unit)
- Part of: Military Air Transport Service
- Motto: Latin: Experto Crede (Trust One Who Has Had Experience)
- Decorations: Air Force Outstanding Unit Award

Insignia
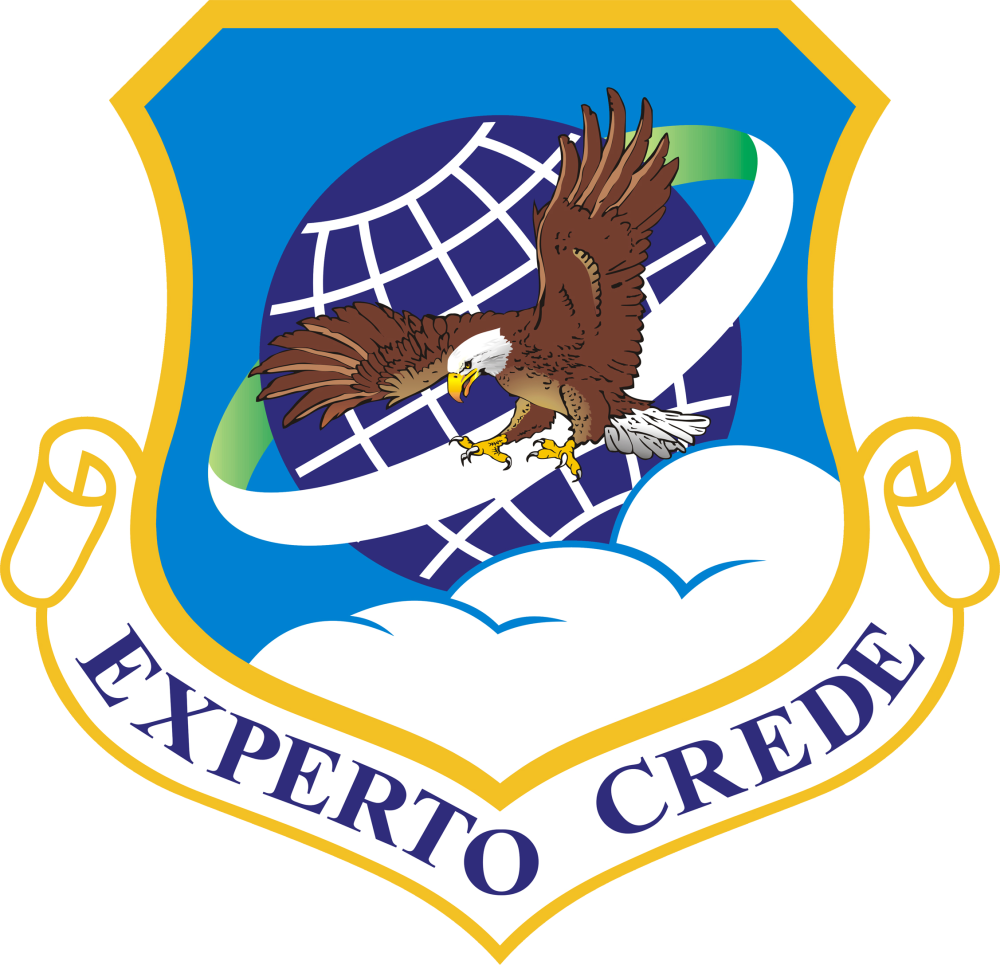
- 1254th Air Transport Wing Emblem (approved 8 September 1955)

The 1254th Air Transport Wing was a United States Air Force unit, existing between 1948 and 1966. It was last stationed at Andrews AFB, Maryland.

The 1254th Air Transport Wing was a wing of the Military Air Transport Service (MATS) which was first organized as a squadron in 1948. The mission of the 1254th Air Transport Wing was to manage the MATS Special Air Mission fleet of aircraft for Very Important Persons (VIP)s in the Washington, D.C. area. The wing reported directly to MATS Headquarters after 1952. It was discontinued on 8 January 1966.

== History ==
For the history of Special Air Missions after 1966 see 89th Airlift Wing

=== Origins ===
In 1944 Air Transport Command (ATC) organized the 503d AAF Base Unit at Washington National Airport, Virginia and assigned it to its North Atlantic Division. The unit replaced the 26th Transport Group and the Washington National Airport Staff Squadron. Because of its frequent transport of high-ranking passengers, the unit was referred to as the "Brass Hat Squadron." The 503d operated the first airplane designated as a presidential plane, the Douglas VC-54C known as the "Sacred Cow." This aircraft was used by Presidents Roosevelt and Truman. It took President Roosevelt to the Yalta Conference in 1945. On 26 July 1947, President Truman signed the National Security Act of 1947 while on board this plane. This act established the Air Force as an independent service, making the Sacred Cow the "birthplace" of the USAF. In 1947 the unit began to operate the Douglas VC-118 named "Independence" after President Truman's home town as the primary presidential airplane.

=== 1254th Squadron ===
On 1 June 1948 Military Air Transport Service (MATS) replaced ATC. MATS organized the 16th Air Transport Squadron at Westover Air Force Base, Massachusetts. The squadron moved to Washington National Airport, Virginia on 1 September. Its mission was to provide air transportation for high-ranking United States government officials, and for designated individuals of foreign dignitaries visiting the United States. The Squadron also sent aircraft to Europe in support of the Berlin Airlift. In October the squadron was redesignated the 1254th Air Transport Squadron. From 1949 to 1951 the squadron also trained an attached Air Force Reserve unit, the 8522d Air Transport Squadron.

In October 1950, President Truman flew a Lockheed VC-121 Constellation, also named "Independence" to the Wake Island Conference to meet with General Douglas MacArthur to confer on the progress of the Korean War.

=== 1254th Group ===
The squadron was expanded to group status on 1 August 1952. The following month, the 1111th Special Air Missions Squadron at Bolling Air Force Base, District of Columbia was transferred to MATS from Headquarters Command, redesignated the 1299th Air Transport Squadron (Special Missions) and assigned to the group, In January 1953 1298th Air Transport Squadrons (Special Missions) was organized under the group at Washington National.

On 1 March 1957 the group was assigned two Bell H-13J helicopters, the first rotary wing aircraft assigned. The H-13s initial mission was to provide short range air transportation for the President to an alternate location in the event of an emergency evacuation. These helicopters remained on alert to perform this mission.

In 1959 the group became the first USAF unit to operate jet aircraft for the transportation of personnel when it accepted three VC-137As. One of the more unusual passengers carried by the wing was Soviet prime minister Nikita Khrushchev who was transported on one of these aircraft during his 1959 tour of the United States.

=== 1254th Wing ===
The unit expanded to wing size and in 1961 all its units moved to Andrews Air Force Base from National Airport and Bolling.

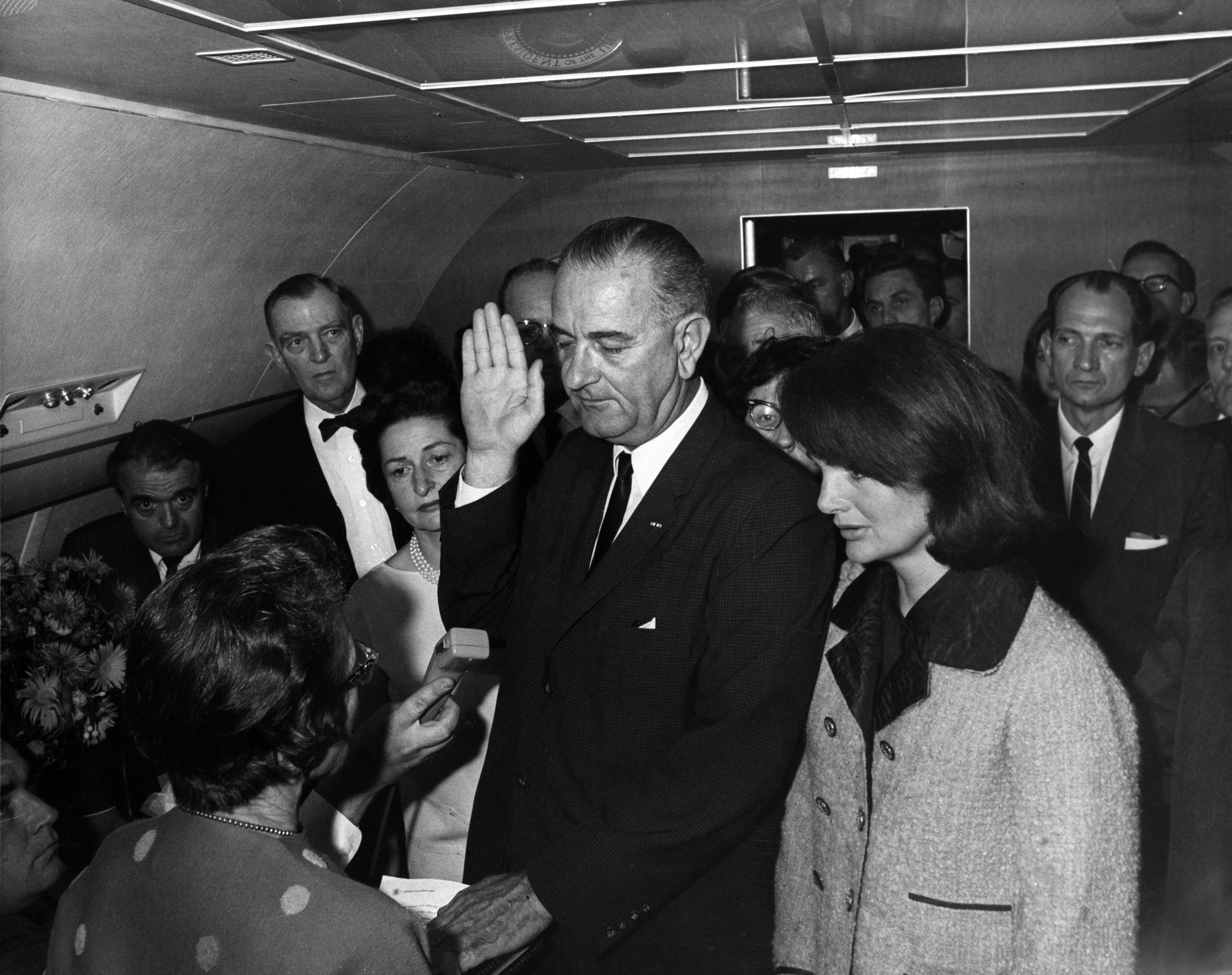
Lyndon B. Johnson taking the oath of office, November 1963 on Boeing VC-137C, AF Ser. No. 62-6000

VC-137C 62-6000 was used for presidential transport during the Kennedy, Johnson, and Nixon Administrations. It was the first aircraft popularly known as Air Force One. It was famously flown to Dallas, Texas, 22 November 1963. it was on this aircraft that Lyndon B. Johnson was sworn into office as the President of the United States, following the assassination of President John F. Kennedy and returned the body of President Kennedy to Washington, D.C. that evening.

With the inactivation of Military Air Transport Service, the 1254th Air Transport Wing was discontinued on 8 January 1966 and its personnel and equipment were reassigned to 89th Military Airlift Wing (MAW) of Military Airlift Command. Its 1298th Air Transport Squadron was replaced by the 98th Military Airlift Squadron and its 1299th Air Transport Squadron by the 99th Military Airlift Squadron. Because this was a MAJCON to AFCON unit conversion, the 89th wing and 98th and 99th squadrons were entitled to retain the honors (but not the history or lineage) of their predecessors. Following this provision 89th adopted the 1254th's emblem as its own on 28 April 1966.

== Lineage ==
- Designated as the 16th Air Transport Squadron

Organized on 1 June 1948
Redesignated 1254th Air Transport Squadron (Special Missions) on 1 October 1948
Redesignated as: 1254th Air Transport Group (Special Missions) on 1 August 1952
Redesignated as: 1254th Air Transport Group (Heavy) (Special Missions) on 1 July 1954
Redesignated as: 1254th Air Transport Wing on 1 December 1960
Discontinued on 8 January 1966

=== Assignments ===
- 520th Air Transport Group, 1 June 1948
- Atlantic Division, Military Air Transport Service, 1 July 1948
- Continental Division, Military Air Transport Service, 1 September 1948
- Military Air Transport Service, 1 January 1951 – 8 January 1966

=== Components ===
Operational Squadrons

- 1298th Air Transport Squadron (Special Missions), 1 February 1953 – 8 January 1966
- 1299th Air Transport Squadron (Special Missions), 1 August 1952 – 8 January 1966

Stationed at Bolling Air Force Base until 10 July 1961

- 8522d Air Transport Squadron (Corollary), (attached 14 July 1949 - 23 June 1951)

Support Squadrons

- 1254th USAF Dispensary, ca. 1 February 1954 - ca. 1 November 1957
- 1254th Air Police Squadron, 1 June 1962 – 8 January 1966
- 1254th Air Terminal Squadron, 1 June 1962 – 8 January 1966
- 1254th Consolidated Aircraft Maintenance Squadron, 1 June 1962 – 8 January 1966
- 1255th Air Base Squadron (later 1255th Support Squadron), 1 August 1952 – 1 April 1964

=== Stations ===
- Westover Air Force Base, Massachusetts, 1 June 1948
- Washington National Airport, Virginia, 1 September 1948
- Andrews AFB, Maryland, 10 July 1961 – 8 January 1966

=== Aircraft ===
==== Presidential Aircraft ====
- Douglas VC-54C 42-107451 "Sacred Cow"

Used by Presidents Roosevelt and Truman. The airplane is now on display at National Museum of the USAF.

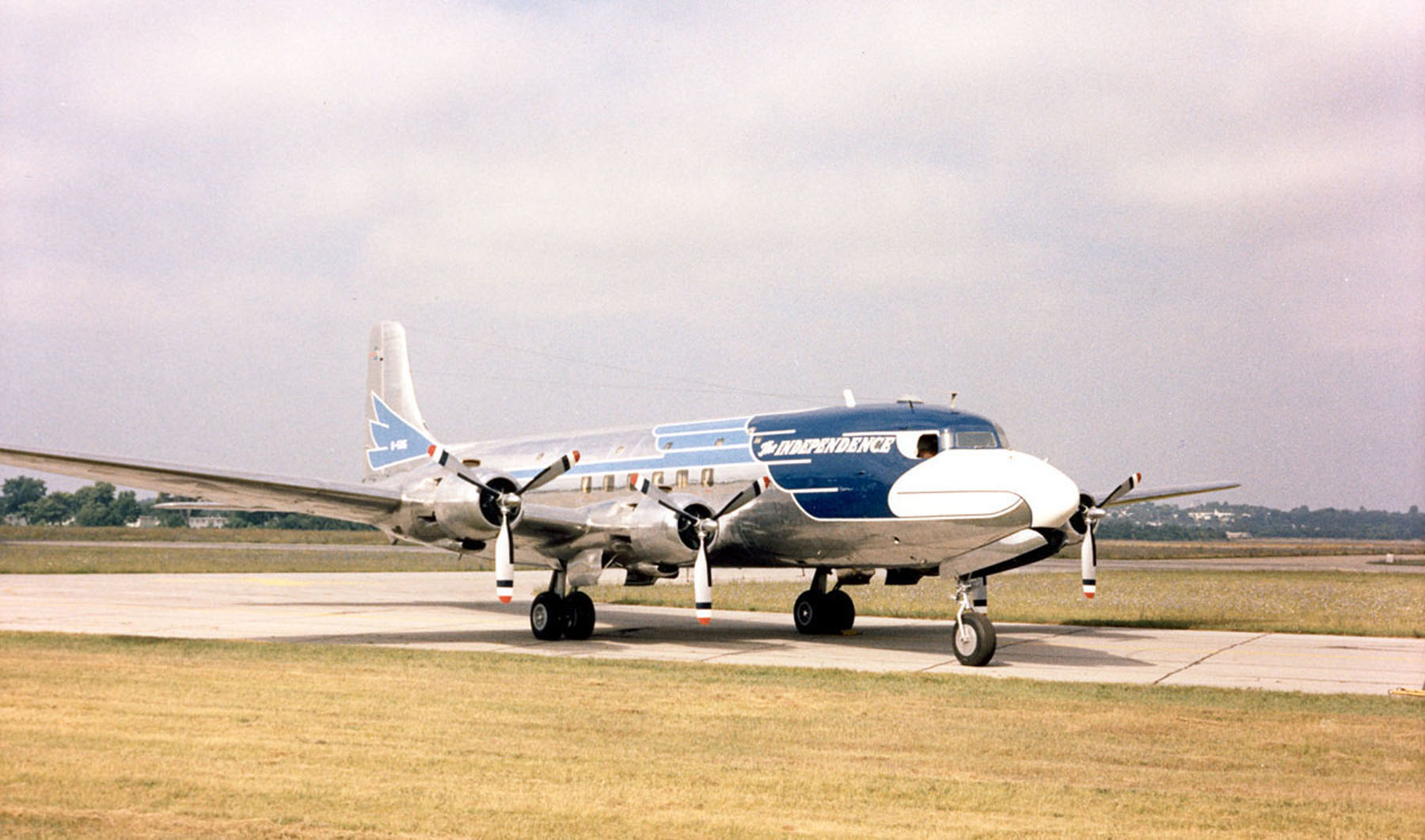
VC-118 "Independence"

- Douglas VC-118 46-505 "Independence"

Used by President Truman. The Army Air Forces ordered the 29th production DC-6 as a replacement for the "Sacred Cow". The aft fuselage was converted into a stateroom. Also, the main cabin seated 24 passengers or could be made up into 12 "sleeper" berths. The airplane is now on display at the National Museum of the United States Air Force.

- Lockheed VC-121 Super Constellation, "Independence"

Replaced the previous airplane

- Lockheed VC-121 Super Constellation, "Colombine II"

Dedicated by Mamie Eisenhower on 24 November 1954

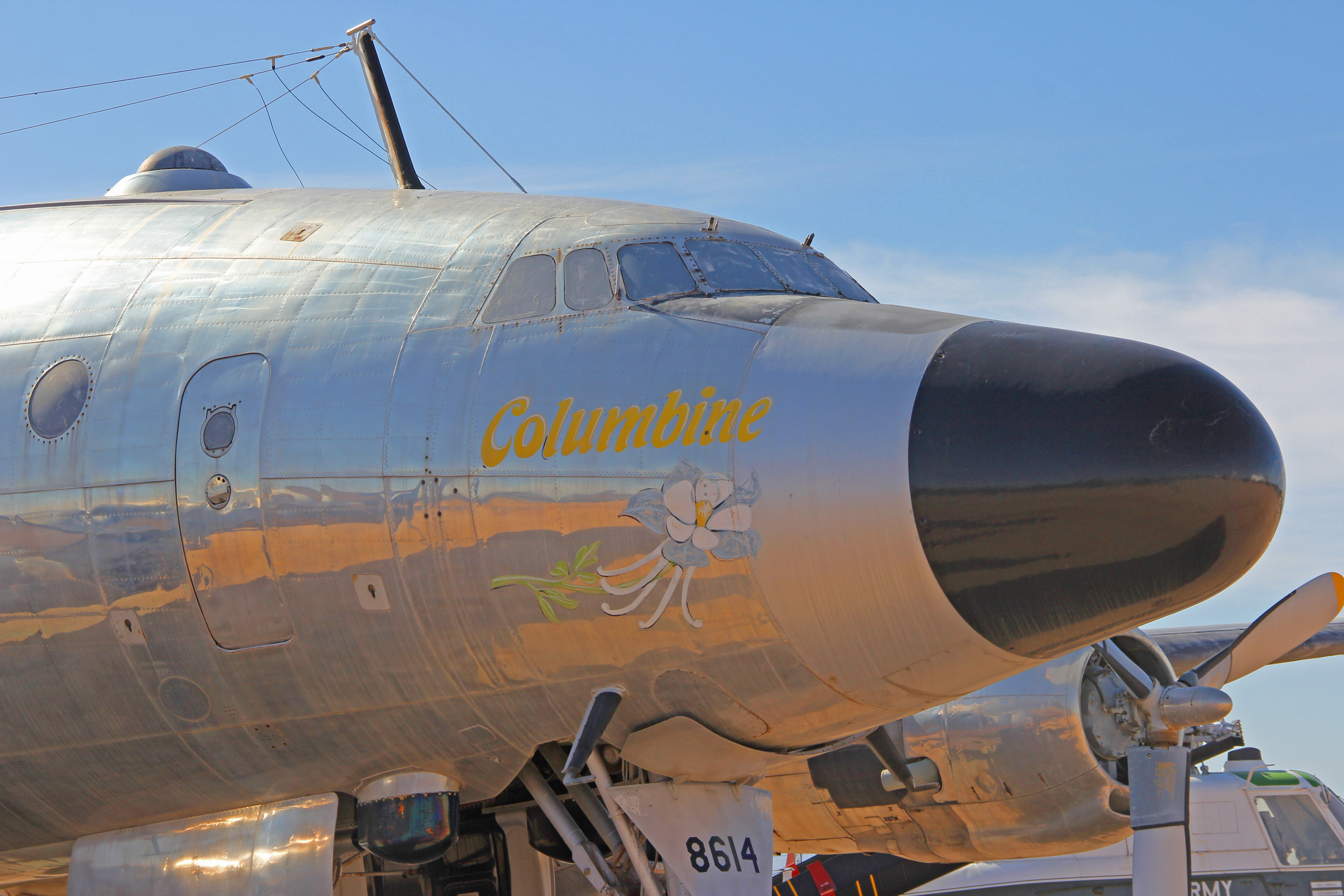
VC-121 "Columbine"

- Lockheed VC-121E Super Constellation, 53-7885 "Colombine III"

Ordered by US Navy as R7V-1 Bu. No. 131650 and diverted during construction as Presidential aircraft. Operated until 1966. The plane was replaced in October 1962 by Boeing VC-137C. The airplane is now on display at the National Museum of the United States Air Force.

- Boeing VC-137A-BN 58–6970; 58–6971, 58-6972

Three commercial 707-153 bought by USAF as VIP transports. All later converted to VC-137B with JT3D-3 turbofans.

6970 to The Museum of Flight, Seattle, WA in June 1996.
6971 to AMARC as CZ0193 8 Oct 1998. On display at Pima Air and Space Museum, Tucson, AZ
6972 scrapped in 1996 due to severe corrosion.

- Boeing VC-137C. 62–6000; 62-7000

Special 707-353B for Office of the President. The airplane was retired from service in 1998. 62-6000 is now in the Presidential Gallery collection of the National Museum of the United States Air Force. The aircraft is currently not on public display due to budget cutbacks at the museum.

==== Other Aircraft ====
- Douglas VC-47 Skytrain
- Douglas VC-54 Skymaster
- Douglas VC-118 Liftmaster
- Convair VC-131 Samaritan

- Fairchild C-123 Provider, 1958-unknown
- Bell H-13J, 1957-unknown
- Aero Commander L-26B (later U-4A), 1956-unknown

=== Award ===
Award streamer	Award	Dates	Notes
	Air Force Outstanding Unit Award	1 January 1962 – 31 December 1963	1254th Air Transport Wing
