= Experto crede =

Latin motto which means Trust in one experienced

Experto crede is a Latin motto which means Trust in one experienced; literally, "trust the expert". It is usually used by an author as an aside to the reader, and may be loosely translated as: "trust me", "trust the expert", "believe one who has tried it", or "have faith in experience". When crede is followed by a personal name (e.g., crede John Smith), the expert in question is the name given.

In the variant form experto credite it is a quotation from the Aeneid by Virgil (Book XI, line 283).

== Uses ==
- It is the trade name of the UK private and public sector finance advisory firm Experto Crede www.expertocrede.com which was formed in 1994.
- It is the official motto of the US Air Force's 89th Airlift Wing, which flies Air Force One and transports other senior leaders of the US government
- Experto Crede is the name of the Assassin Adéwalé's ship in Assassin's Creed Freedom Cry.

== See also ==
- List of Latin phrases
- Argument from authority
