= Military Air Transport Service =

1948–1966 United States Armed Forces unified command

- Military Air Transport Service emblem
- Active: 1948–1966
- Country: United States
- Branch: Department of Defense Unified Command
- Type: Major Command
- Role: Strategic Airlift

Aircraft flown
- Transport: C-141A Starlifter; C-130 Hercules; C-135 Stratolifter; C-133 Cargomaster; C-124 Globemaster; C-121 Super Constellation; C-54 Skymaster; C-47 Skytrain; RC-130 Hercules

The Military Air Transport Service (MATS) is an inactive Department of Defense Unified Command. Activated on 1 June 1948, MATS was a consolidation of the United States Navy's Naval Air Transport Service (NATS) and the United States Air Force's Air Transport Command (ATC) into a single joint command. It was inactivated and discontinued on 8 January 1966, superseded by the Air Force's Military Airlift Command (MAC) as a separate strategic airlift command, and it returned shore-based Navy cargo aircraft to Navy control as operational support airlift (OSA) aircraft.

In 1966, the World War II ATC (1942–1948) and the Military Air Transport Service were consolidated with Military Airlift Command (MAC) (1966–1992).

== Overview ==
The Military Air Transport Service (MATS) was activated under United States Air Force Major General Laurence S. Kuter, in order to harness interservice efforts more efficiently. It was an amalgamation of Navy and Army air transport commands, jointly placed by the Department of Defense under the control of the newly created United States Air Force (USAF) as a unified (joint) command.

During the Second World War, the Army Air Force's aerial transport arm was the Air Transport Command, which had a dual function of ferrying new aircraft from factories to combat theaters and transportation of troops and supplies, also organized by Tunner. The Naval Air Transport Service focused on supporting deployed Naval and Marine personnel transporting vital cargo, specialist personnel and mail to the Fleet and ground forces, especially in advanced areas of operation.

MATS was the first Joint-Service command, and naval aircrews participated in every major MATS airlift operation. MATS would organizationally be under the Department of the Air Force, as the vast majority of its equipment and personnel of ATC had been inherited by the Air Force with the inactivation of the USAAF.

During the Berlin Airlift, Naval aviators flew transport aircraft from the United States to European supply depots; in the Korean War, MATS Navy Squadrons airlifted some 17,000 battle casualties. In its original organization, a Rear Admiral commanded the MATS Pacific Division and another rear admiral served as MATS vice-commander. During the 1958 reorganization, senior Naval officers were on the staffs of the commanders of both EASTAF and WESTAF, and at MATS Headquarters.

In 1965 conflicting views of the Air Force and Navy triggered by the demands of the Vietnam War led to the services returning to separate airlift commands. In turn, MATS was disbanded and superseded in the Air Force by the Military Airlift Command, during a 1966 restructuring.

== History ==
=== Origins ===
With the end of World War II, the United States Army Air Forces Air Transport Command found itself in limbo. Senior USAAF authorities considered ATC to be a wartime necessity that was no longer needed, and expected its civilian personnel, including former airline pilots, to return to their peacetime occupations. Senior ATC officers, on the other hand, thought that ATC should be developed into a national government operated airline, an idea that was soundly opposed by the airline industry. While the war had firmly established the necessity of a troop carrier mission, most military officers believed the role performed by ATC should be provided by contract carriers.

When the United States Air Force was established as a separate service in 1947, the Air Transport Command was not established as one of its major commands. The ATC commander and his staff took it upon themselves to convince the new civilian leadership of the newly created Department of Defense (DOD) (and Secretaries of the Army and Air Force) that ATC had a mission. They seized upon testimony by former I Troop Carrier Command commander Major General Paul L. Williams that the Air Force should have a long-range troop deployment capability, and began advocating that ATC transports could be used to deploy troops. Williams had been pressing for the development of a long-range troop carrier airplane when he made his statement.

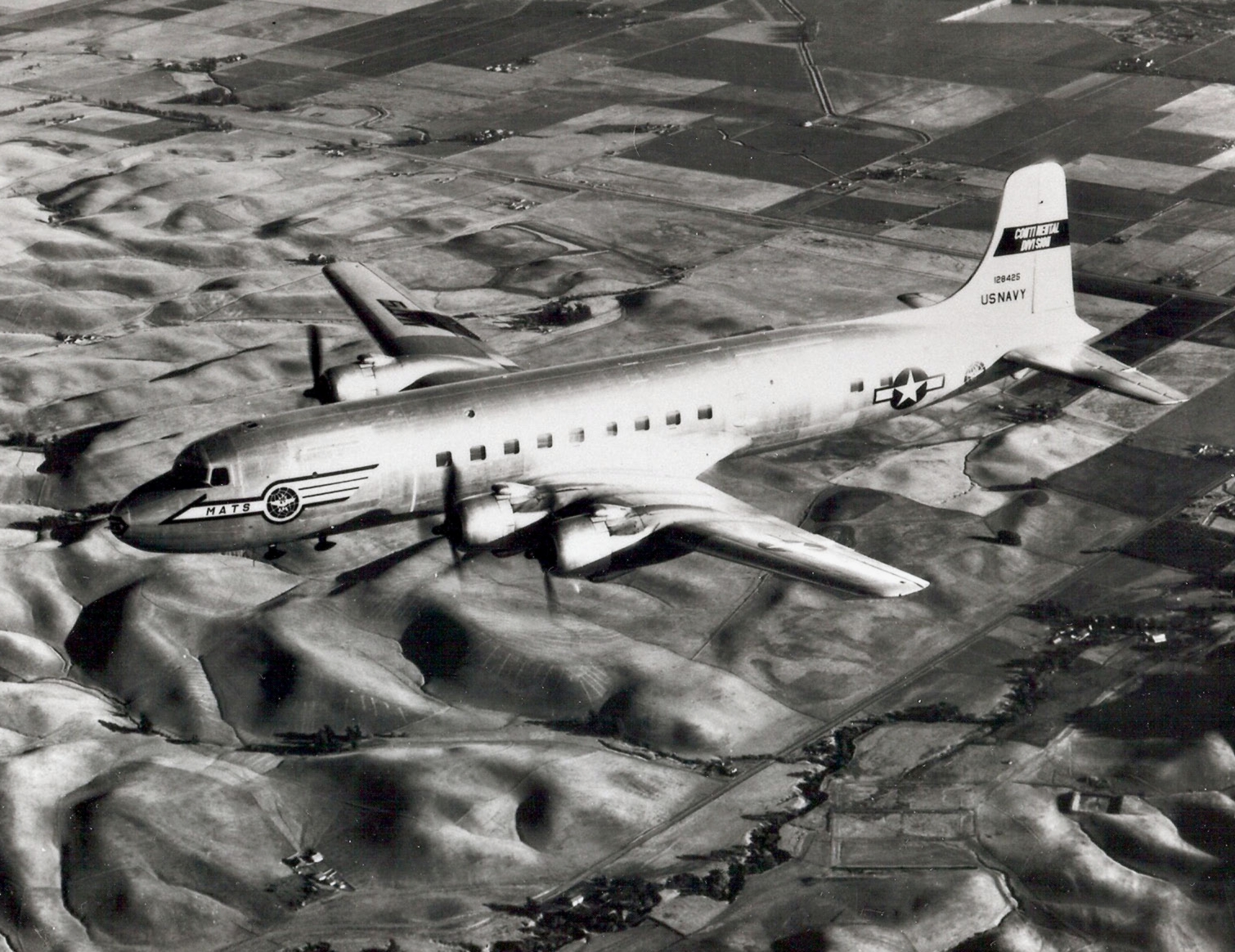
A U.S. Navy Douglas R6D-1 Liftmaster, BuNo 128425, operating for the Military Air Transport Service in the 1950s.

The DOD believed it should have its own air transport service and decided that ATC should become the Military Air Transport Service (MATS), supported by the Air Force, even though not listed as a formal military mission. Also, as a cost-saving measure, MATS would combine the resources of Air Transport Command with those of the Naval Air Transport Service. This way the command would be sanctioned by the Department of Defense, and not by either the Air Force or the Navy.

Although MATS was under the operational control of the United States Air Force, the United States Navy was a full partner in the command and operational components of the organization. Major naval components of MATS were naval air transport (VR) squadrons. VR-3 and VR-6 were assigned to McGuire AFB and VR-22 was assigned to the Naval Air Transport Station at Naval Station Norfolk/Chambers Field, Virginia. Together they constituted MATS EASTAF's Naval Air Transport Wing, Atlantic. On the Pacific Coast, Naval Air Transport Wing, Pacific, consisted of Air Transport Squadron VR-7 and Maintenance Squadron VR-8, both at Naval Air Station Moffett Field, California. A detachment of VR-7 was also stationed at Tachikawa Air Base, Japan.

Naval aviators flew scheduled MATS routes to Newfoundland, Iceland, Scotland, West Germany, Italy, Puerto Rico and Africa. In the Pacific, MATS naval aviators flew to all MATS stations from Hawaii to Japan to South Vietnam, Bangkok, India and to Saudi Arabia.

Air Force pilots flew Navy MATS planes, just as naval aviators could be found piloting Air Force MATS transport aircraft.

=== Organization ===
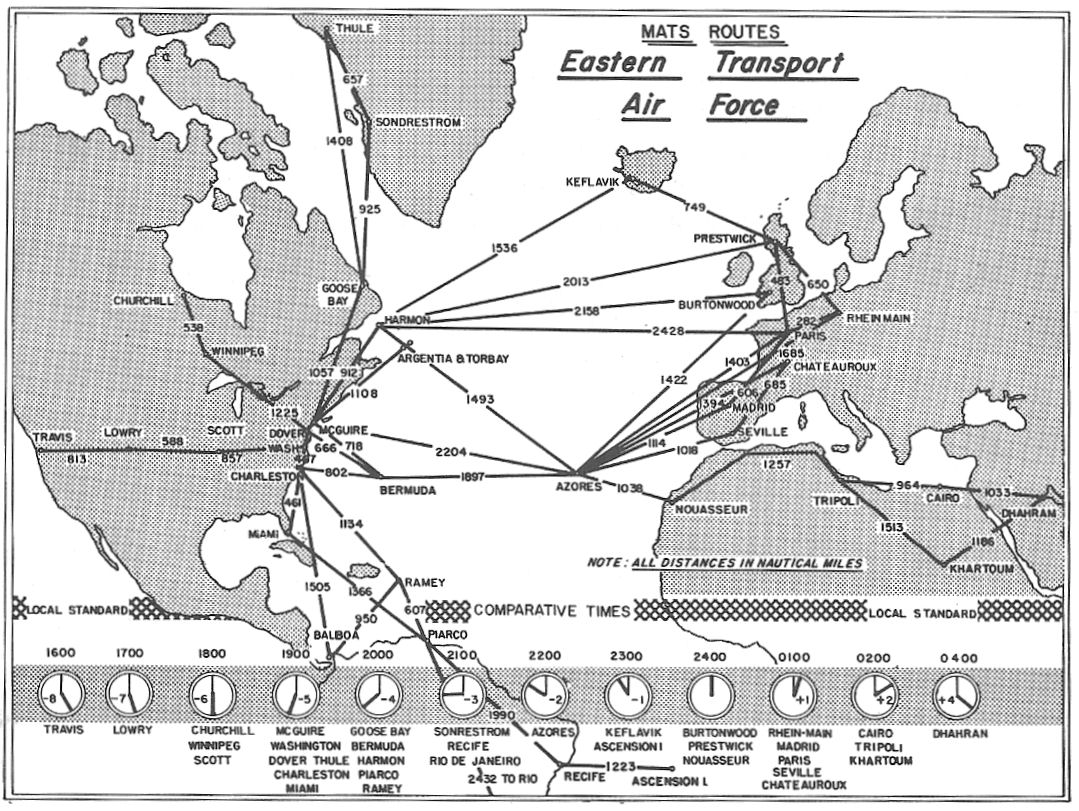
Routes of the Eastern Transport Air Force, 1964

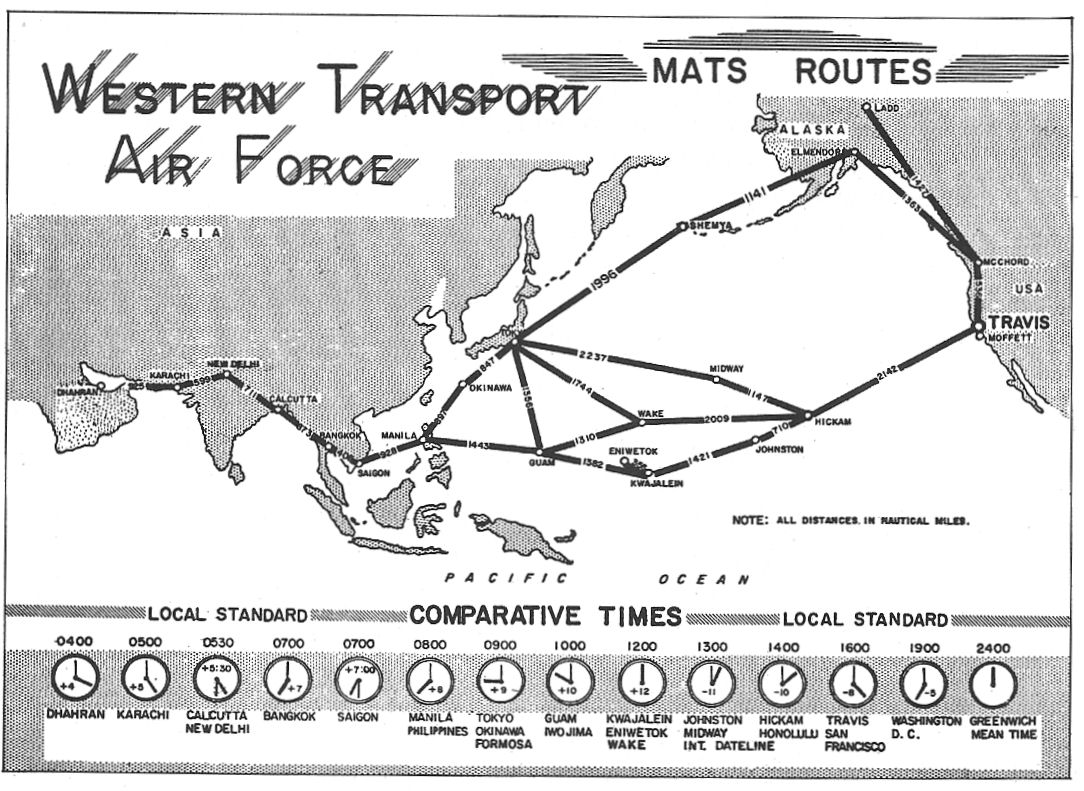
Route map of the Western Transport Air Force, 1964

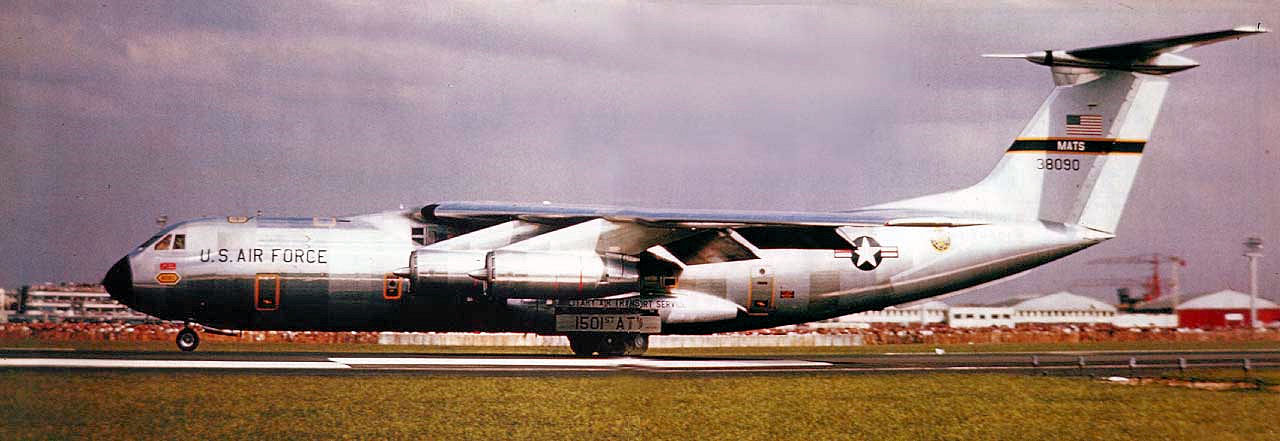
MATS Lockheed C-141A-10-LM Starlifter, AF Ser. No. 63-8090, in 1965 just after delivery to the 1501st Air Transport Wing at Travis AFB. Retired on 7 August 1996, Scrapped 29 July 2003.

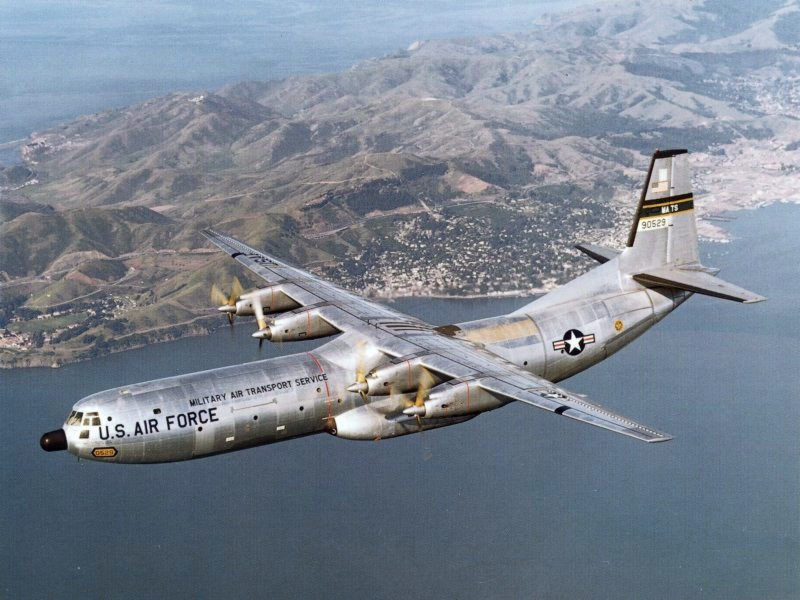
Douglas C-133B-DL Cargomaster, AF Ser. No. 59-0529, of the 1501st Air Transport Wing over San Francisco Bay in 1960. This aircraft was retired in 1971 and was on display at New England Air Museum, Bradley, Connecticut (USA), but was destroyed by a tornado on 3 October 1979. Nose and other pieces now at the AMC Museum at Dover AFB, Delaware.

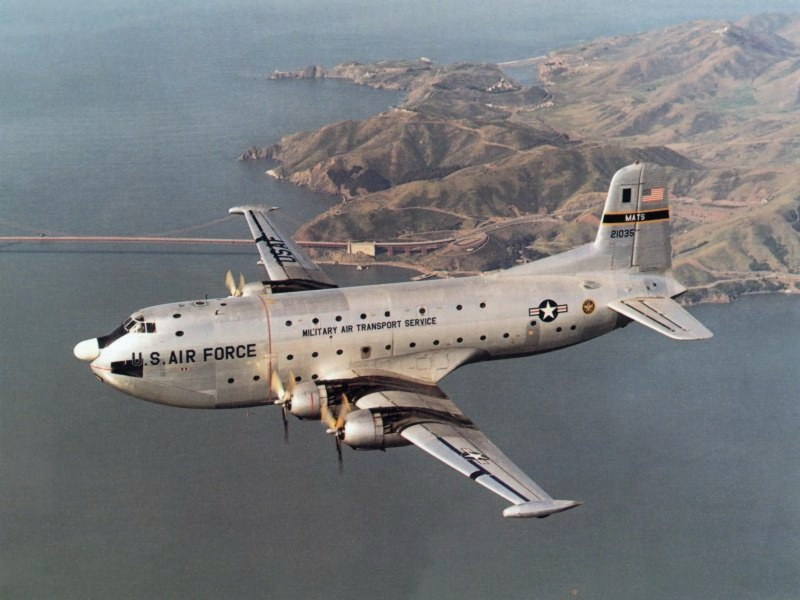
Douglas C-124C Globemaster II, AF Ser. No. 52-1036

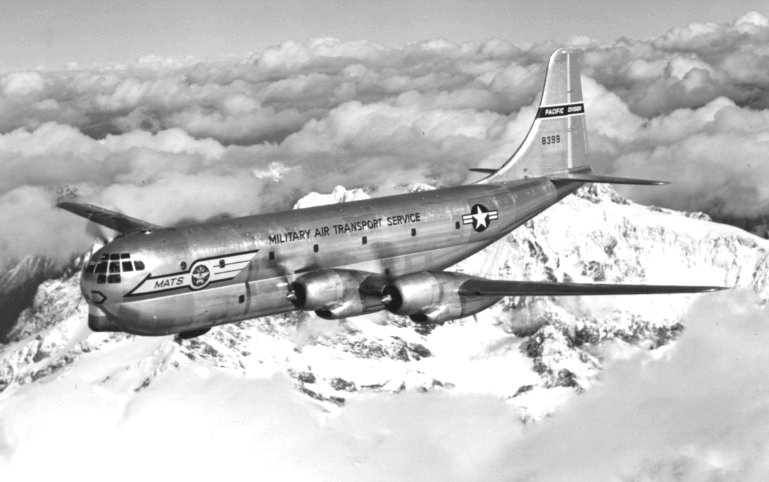
C-97 in MATS markings

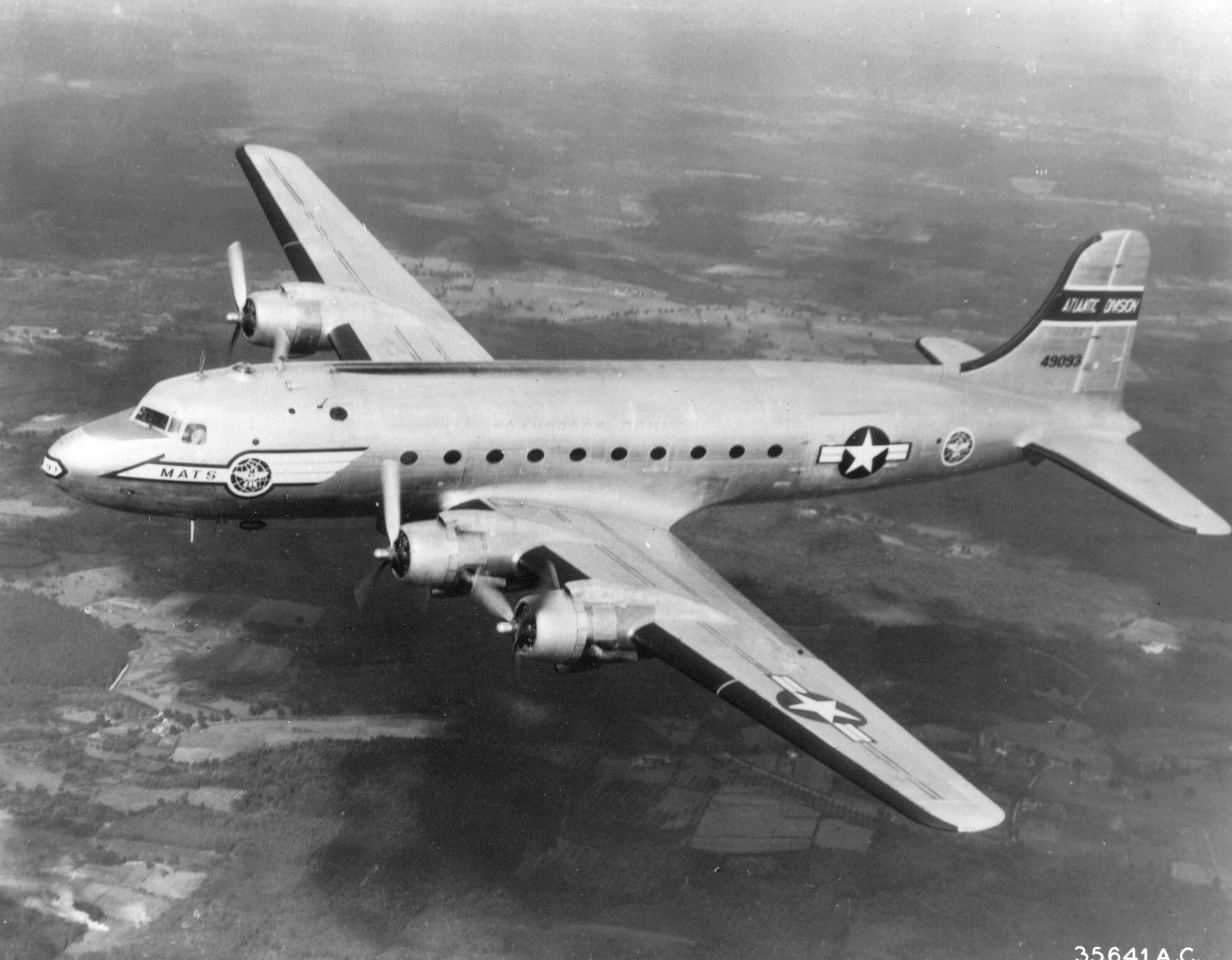
Douglas C-54E-10-DO Skymaster, AF Ser. No. 44-9093. Converted to MC-54M in 1951. To civil registry as N4989K. Last known still in service by Contract Air Cargo, Fort Lauderdale, Florida flying in Africa.

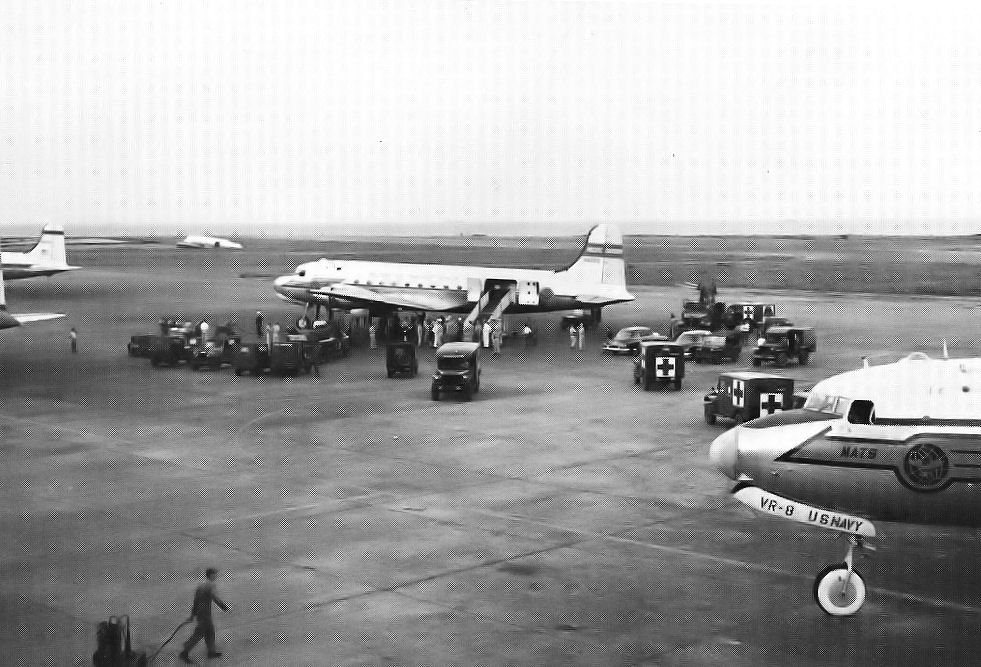
MATS United States Navy R5D-3 Skymaster transports from VR-8 evacuating wounded from South Korea, 1952

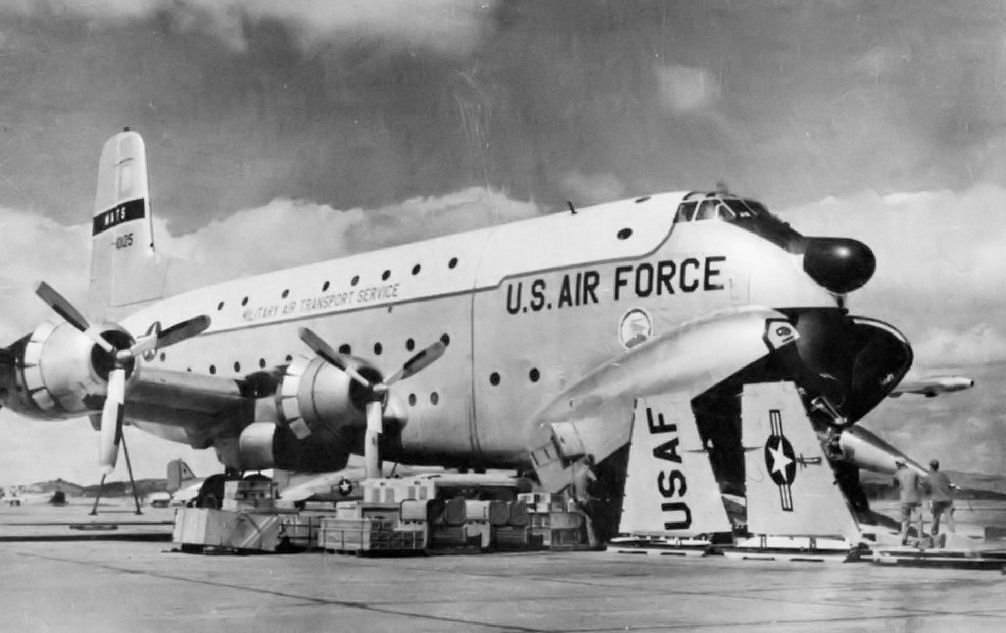
63d TCW C-124 at Hamilton AFB, California being prepared to load a Lockheed F-104 Starfighter being transported to Formosa, 1958

During World War II, the USAAF Air Transport Command provided worldwide transport service to every continent on the globe. Inheriting that legacy, MATS continued that service and organized it into three major transport divisions;

- Atlantic Division (after 1 July 1958: EASTAF) - From McGuire AFB, New Jersey, provided service across the Atlantic Ocean to Europe; to the Caribbean and South America; to North Africa and the Middle East to Dhahran, Saudi Arabia
- Pacific Division (after 1 July 1958: WESTAF) - From Travis AFB, California, provided service to Hawaii and on to locations in the Pacific, including Japan and the Philippines; across Southeast Asia; India; Pakistan and on to Dhahran, Saudi Arabia.
- Continental Division - From McGuire to points in Northern Canada; along the North Atlantic coast north to Thule AB, Greenland. From Travis north to McChord AFB, Washington, then north to Alaska and Aleutian Islands, then a connection into Tachikawa AB, Japan from Shemya AFS. Also provided coast to coast aeromedical evacuation flights within the United States and cargo service between major Air Force Air Materiel Command depots. The division was disbanded on 1 July 1958, with mission divided between Eastern Transport Air Force (EASTAF) and Western Transport Air Force (WESTAF).

When MATS was established, it also took responsibility for several other missions:

- Special Air Mission (SAM)

The Special Air Mission was the transport of the President of the United States; Vice-President; Cabinet Members; Member of Congress; Senators, and designated other individuals, such as Foreign Heads of State.

- Air Rescue Service (ARS)

Provided rescue of downed military service members in enemy occupied areas; humanitarian relief to civilians in emergency conditions (floods, hurricanes, earthquakes)

- Air Weather Service (AWS)

Weather forecasting for military airfields; hurricane hunters.

- Air Photographic and Charting Service (APCS)

Mapping the world providing accurate aerial charts to military aviators wherever they need to be. Also producing all Air Force training films; public relations films; monthly newsreels, and coordinating with private filmmakers with regards to use of Air Force equipment and facilities.

- Aeromedical Transport Wing (AMTW)

Evacuation of wounded military personnel from combat zones; transport of critically ill military personnel (and dependents) to military medical facilities for treatment.

- Air Resupply And Communications Service (ARCS)

Performed unconventional warfare missions during the Korean War and early years of the Cold War (1950–1956).

=== Major operations ===
==== Berlin Airlift (1948–1949) ====
MATS was established on 1 June 1948, less than a month before the commencement of the Berlin Airlift -- "OPERATION VITTLES" where at peak operations, planes were landing and departing every ninety seconds or so shuttling in thousands of tons of supplies, food, and fuel each day - but they were not MATS airplanes. The Soviet Union had blocked all surface transportation in the western part of Berlin. Railroads tracks were destroyed, barges were stopped on the rivers, and highways and roads blocked. The only avenue left was through the air. On 26 June 1948, the airlift began. Troop carrier transports from around the globe began making their way to Germany, where they were assigned to United States Air Forces, Europe. Squadrons transferred from as far away as Hawaii and Japan, and included two of the U.S. Navy's air transport squadrons assigned to MATS. MATS itself was not "in charge" of the airlift, although several MATS staff officers were sent to Germany to serve in the Airlift Task Force in an administrative role. Lt. General William H. Tunner was placed in overall command of airlift operations, reporting to the commander of United States Air Forces, Europe. The airlift itself was a USAFE operation and all airplanes assigned to it were assigned to one of five troop carrier groups that were sent to Europe to operate the airlift. MATS played a supporting role, including ferrying C-54s to and from the airlift bases and maintenance depots in the United States and the MATS C-54 training school trained pilots for temporary duty in the airlift. MATS transports delivered crucial aircraft parts to the airlift bases in Europe. This operation would continue for some 15 months until the Soviets lifted the blockade. MATS would provide numerous humanitarian airlifts of global proportions. The U.S. Navy was an integral part of MATS, providing five transport squadrons to the joint service effort, but they operated under USAFE while they were part of the airlift.

==== Korean War (1950–1953) ====
The organization's next major test was the bootstrap supply operations supporting the United Nations troops under General Douglas MacArthur in the country of South Korea which was nearly overrun by the time UN forces were mobilized. The MATS role was purely logistical, and operated from the United States to Japan. Theater transport forces assigned to the Far East Air Forces Combat Cargo Command, which became the 315th Air Division, operated supply routes into Japan and provided troop carrier services for UN forces.

==== Suez, Lebanon and Taiwan Straits Crisis (1956–1958) ====
During the 1956 Suez Crisis, MATS MATS airlifted 1,300 Colombian and Indian troops from Bogotá and Agra to the United Nations staging area in Naples, Italy, to supplement the UN police force in the Suez area. In 1958, MATS airlifted 5,500 tons of cargo and 5,400 troops to the Middle East in support of the Lebanese government, also supporting the move of a TAC Composite Air Strike Force to the area. Also in 1958, MATS flew 144 airlift trips to the Far East when the crisis arose in the Formosa Straits, supporting the move of a Composite Air Strike Force, and airlifting a squadron of F-104 Starfighters to Taiwan.

==== Operation Deep Freeze (1957–1963) ====
In December 1962, MATS Douglas C-124 Globemasters ended six years of seasonal flying as members of the Air Force-Navy team resupplying scientific stations in the Antarctic. During that time the aircraft, operated by the 63d Troop Carrier Wing stationed at Donaldson Air Force Base, South Carolina, air-dropped about 4,000 tons of supplies from the main Antarctic base at McMurdo Sound to remote stations near and at the South Pole. Beginning in 1963, Lockheed C-130E Hercules, newer, faster, and longer range, picked up the MATS portion of the mission. The performance of the C-124s in the Antarctic cold strengthened the concept of airlift flexibility by doing in a few weeks (each year) a job that would have taken surface transportation several months. During Deep Freeze III, a C-124 air-dropped a seven-ton tractor to an isolated site, and during Deep Freeze 62 (October–December 1961), three C-124's made the longest flight in Antarctic history, a 3,100-mile round trip to airdrop supplies. Also during Deep Freeze 62, Lt. Gen. Joe W. Kelly became the first MATS commander to visit the operation. MATS vice commander, Maj. Gen. Raymond J. Reeves, visited Deep Freeze 63.

==== Congo Airlift (1960–1963) ====
MATS C-124 Globemasters and C-118 Liftmasters (and in November 1962, pure-jet C-135 Stratolifters) by the end of November had chalked up more than 2,000 missions in history's longest airlift reaching 5,000 miles from Europe around Africa's West Coast to Leopoldville in the Congo. MATS entered the United Nations airlift under direction of the United States Air Forces in Europe (USAFE) 322d Air Division, 16 July 1960, and at the peak had 60 aircraft committed. By the end of 1962, about 49,000 troops and 11,000 tons of cargo had been airlifted to and from points as far away as New Delhi, India.

==== Berlin Crisis (1961) ====
As a result of the construction of the Berlin Wall and the ending of free crossing to and from their occupation zone of Berlin, more than 100 MATS =aircraft from EASTAF and WESTAF participated in deployments of American forces from the United States to West Germany and France.

When the Reserve Forces were called to active duty in October 1961, MATS airlift force and technical units provided support for their movement to Europe. Operation Stair Step was the name given to the deployment of Air National Guard fighter units overseas to NATO bases in France, and Operation High Top was the redeployment, June–August 1962. In High Top, for example, more than 260 missions were flown by MATS aircraft of all types, including the C-97's which themselves had been called to active duty. These aircraft returned more than 9,600 ANG personnel and 1,400 tons of equipment.

On addition, the 101st Airborne Division was airlifted from Fort Campbell, Kentucky to locations in Turkey. Approximately 2,000 personnel and 900 tons of equipment were airlifted (Exercise Checkmate II). During the exercise, about 300 MATS airmen and officers lived in tents for about three weeks handling maintenance and communications. Lt. Gen. Joe W. Kelly, MATS commander, was on hand to greet the first arriving aircraft, Despite "miserable" weather, no accidents or incidents occurred.

Throughout 1962, tensions were high in Europe and in January, Exercise Long Thrust II was commenced in which MATS new four-engined jets, the Boeing C-135 Stratolifter, made their first appearance in a major airlift when 12 of them airlifted nearly 500 Army troops over the north polar route from Fort Lewis, Washington, to central West Germany. They made the nonstop trip in little more than 10 hours compared to the piston-engined aircraft which averaged between 30 and 35 hours along normal routes. Altogether, more than 200 MATS aircraft moved 5,300 troops of three battle groups of the Army's 4th Infantry Division in the deployment phase. The jets brought one battle group back. In West Germany, the troops participated in ground maneuvers with NATO forces.

==== Cuban Missile Crisis (1962) ====
In the midst of one of the heaviest airlift schedules it has ever had (more than 17 airlifts under way or developing during October and November), MATS was called on to support the buildup of forces in the southeastern part of the United States. On 16 October, MATS began working at its wartime activity rate. Between 16 October and the end of the month, MATS airlifted thousands of troops and thousands of tons in hundreds of sorties from bases throughout the country into Florida and Guantánamo Bay, Cuba. Included in this was the first major airlift of United States Marines and their combat gear by MATS. Also, during this buildup, MATS lost its first C-135 Stratolifter jet while it was engaged in an ammunition airlift to Guantánamo Bay. All three of the technical services stepped up activities to provide close weather, rescue, and documentation support to the buildup.

During the airlift operation, MATS was called on to react to a call for arms to India in early November to stem the Communist Chinese invasion. The airlift required the movement of 980 tons of small arms more than 6,000 miles from Rhein-Main AB, West Germany, to Dum-Dum Airport, Calcutta. This "no notice" airlift was accomplished in eight days by MATS C-135 Stratolifter jets.

==== Operation "Big Lift" (1963) ====
In the first time that a full United States Army division and elements of a Tactical Air Command Strike Force were ferried across the ocean in one big airlift, 15,358 officers and men of the 2nd Armored Division, their support troops, and 504 tons of battle equipment were airlifted by 204 MATS aircraft from eight bases in the South and southwestern United States to France and Germany. They were accompanied by 116 tactical fighters and reconnaissance aircraft of the Composite Air Strike Force (CASF) who flew across the Atlantic. The entire operation was accomplished in 2½ days, employing 234 missions. The C-135 Stratolifter jets made the 5,600-mile trip in 10½ hours nonstop, carrying 75 troops each. It took the C-124 Globemasters three times as long, with refueling stops in Bermuda and the Azores to carry 80 troops and cargo. Following the NATO ground manoeuvers in Europe, the troops were lifted back to the United States on 21 November 1963

==== Vietnam War ====
Beginning in 1948, MATS flew airlift missions into French Indochina, providing airlifts of military equipment and supplies to the French government and colonial Vietnamese forces fighting the Viet Minh. In 1954, at the request of the French, wounded Legionnaires from Dien Bien Phu were transported from Tan Son Nhut Airport to either Algeria or France. Initially flown from Saigon to Tachikawa AB near Tokyo on C-124s, over 14,000 wounded soldiers received stabilization medical care. From Japan, the wounded were airlifted across the Pacific Ocean to the Western United States on MATS C-97s. At each of the subsequent stops at Hickam AFB, Hawaii; Travis AFB, California, and Westover AFB, Massachusetts, there were layovers of about a day. This portion of the journey was carried out by MATS' Pacific Division. From Westover, the Atlantic Division took charge and airlifted the wounded to Orly Air Base in France and Oran Airport in Algeria. From start to finish, the mission took about a month to complete.

Throughout the 1950s and early 1960s military aid was shipped to the South Vietnamese government by MATS airlift flights into Tan Son Nhut. In addition, military flights were made to Don Muang Airport in Bangkok which were designated for the Thai Militarily to protect their border along the Mekong River, or clandestinely to the Laotian Government, who were fighting communist rebels in Laos.

As the United States built up its forces in Southeast Asia in the early 1960s, the number of MATS flights to the area increased. MATS C-124s and C-133 Cargomasters were common sights. After the 1964 Gulf of Tonkin Incident, and the decision being made to escalate United States involvement in the Vietnam War, MATS performed a critical role in the air transport of personnel and equipment to the war zone. Throughout 1964 and 1965 MATS flew large numbers of United States Army and United States Marines to South Vietnam. Large MATS aerial ports were established at Da Nang, Cam Ranh Bay and Tan Son Nhut in South Vietnam, as well as at Don Muang Airport in Thailand to support the United States forces there. The first large-scale MATS jet transport flights of C-141A Starlifters were to Tan Son Nhut Air Base in 1965.

During Vietnam, MATS was jokingly said to be an acronym for "Maybe Again, Tomorrow, Sometime."

==== Military Airlift Command ====
On 1 January 1966, as a result of the Navy announcing the withdrawal of its components, MATS was redesignated Military Airlift Command.

The R5D Skymasters of Naval Transport Squadron Seven Alpha (VR-7A) were retired in July 1966 and the unit inactivated. VR-7, flying C-121/RV-7 Super Constellations remained attached to MAC until 31 January 1967, and the Naval Air Transport Wing (Pacific) was inactivated on 23 March 1967. VR-8 and VR-22 at NAS Moffett Field withdrew its C-130s from MAC on 20 April. The last naval squadron, VR-3, flying C-130s from McGuire AFB, was inactivated on 30 June and the formal DOD program action directive relieving the Navy from MAC responsibilities became effective 1 July 1967.

Most passenger transport missions except the Special Air Mission were contracted out by MAC to commercial airlines such as Pan American, TWA, United, Continental, Northwest and charter companies such as Flying Tiger, using the Civil Reserve Air Fleet (CRAF). This provided commercial airline pilots and aircrews valuable training, and during the years of the Vietnam War, seeing Boeing 707 and Douglas DC-8 commercial airliners at MAC aerial ports in Southeast Asia was a common sight.

On 1 December 1974, MAC expanded its mission by acquiring the theater troop carrying and tactical airlift mission (i.e., C-130 Hercules, C-123 Provider, C-7 Caribou) previously performed by the combat commands (TAC, PACAF, USAFE). In 1987, MAC was designated as the Air Force component of the United States Transportation Command (USTRANSCOM), a unified joint-service command.

In June 1992, MAC was reorganized and redesignated as the Air Mobility Command (AMC) with a broadened mission of aerial refueling (i.e., KC-135 Stratotanker and KC-10 Extender), acquired from the inactivating Strategic Air Command. AMC then succeeded MAC as the USAF component of USTRANSCOM.

=== Lineage ===
- Established and activated as Military Air Transport Service on 1 June 1948

Mission and operational control of Air Transport Command, established on 29 May 1941, consolidated into organization same date.

Air Transport command discontinued and inactivated same date.

Mission and operational control of Naval Air Transport Service, established on 12 December 1941, consolidated into organization same date.

Naval Air Transport Service disestablished, 1 July 1948

Redesignated Military Airlift Command on 1 January 1966

Navy components assigned to: United States Navy.

=== Components ===
==== Headquarters ====
- Headquarters, MATS

Andrews AFB, Maryland, 1 June 1948
Scott AFB, Illinois, 15 January 1958 – 1 January 1966

- Continental Division, 1 June 1948

Headquartered: Kelly AFB, Texas
Redesignated: Western Transport Air Force, (WESTAF) 1 July 1958 – 1 January 1966
Headquarters moved to: Travis AFB, California

- Atlantic Division, 1 June 1948

Headquartered: Westover AFB, Massachusetts
Redesignated: Eastern Transport Air Force, (EASTAF) 1 July 1958 – 1 January 1966
Headquarters moved to: McGuire AFB, New Jersey

- Pacific Division, 1 June 1948 – 30 June 1958

Headquarters: Hickam AFB, Territory of Hawaii
Inactivated, units reassigned to WESTAF

==== Services ====
- Air Rescue Service (ARS)

Redesignated: Aerospace Rescue Recovery Service (ARRS)

- Air Weather Service (AWS)
- Special Airlift Mission (SAM)
- Air Photographic and Charting Service (APCS)
- Aeromedical Transport Wing (AMTW)
- Air Resupply And Communications Service (ARCS)

==== Air Transport Units ====
- 1100th Special Air Missions Wing, Bolling AFB, District of Columbia, 1 June 1948

Redesignated: 1254th Air Transport Wing, Andrews AFB, Maryland, 10 July 1961 – 8 January 1966
Personnel and equipment reassigned to: 89th Military Airlift Wing, Military Airlift Command, 8 January 1966

- 1405th Aeromedical Transport Wing, Scott AFB, Illinois, 26 August 1948

Redesignated: 375th Aeromedical Airlift Wing, 31 December 1965
Transferred to Military Airlift Command, 8 January 1966

- 1501st Air Transport Wing, Fairfield-Suisun (Later Travis) AFB, California, 1 June 1948 – 8 January 1966

Personnel and equipment reassigned to: 60th Military Airlift Wing, Military Airlift Command, 8 January 1966

- 1500th Air Transport Wing, Hickam AFB, Hawaii, 1 June 1948

Redesignated: 1502d Air Transport Wing, 1 July 1955 – 8 January 1966
Personnel and equipment reassigned to: 61st Military Airlift Wing, Military Airlift Command, 8 January 1966

- 1503d Air Transport Group, Tachikawa AB, Japan, 1 June 1948

Redesignated: 1503d Air Transport Group, 22 June 1964 – 8 January 1966

- 1600th Air Transport Group, Westover AFB, Massachusetts, 1 June 1948 – 1 April 1955
- 1602d Air Transport Wing, Wiesbaden AB, Germany (later West Germany), 1 June 1948 – 1 July 1952

Transferred to Kindley AFB, Bermuda, Bermuda Base Command

- 1603d Air Transport Wing, Wheelus AB, Libya, 1 June 1948 – 1 January 1953

Reassigned to United States Air Forces in Europe

- 1605th Air Transport Wing, Lajes AB, Azores, 1 June 1948 – 8 January 1966
- 1607th Air Transport Group, Dover AFB, Delaware, 1 January 1954

Redesignated: 1607th Air Transport Wing, 1 February 1954 – 8 January 1966
Personnel and equipment reassigned to: 436th Military Airlift Wing, Military Airlift Command, 8 January 1966

- 1608th Air Transport Group, Charleston AFB, South Carolina, 15 January 1954

Redesignated: 1608th Air Transport Wing, 1 March 1955 – 8 January 1966
Personnel and equipment reassigned to: 437th Military Airlift Wing, Military Airlift Command, 8 January 1966

- 1611th Air Transport Wing, McGuire AFB, New Jersey, 1 May 1954 – 8 January 1966

Personnel and equipment reassigned to: 438th Military Airlift Wing, Military Airlift Command, 8 January 1966

- 1700th Air Transport Group, Kelly AFB, Texas, 1 June 1948 – 1 May 1957
- 1701st Air Transport Wing, Great Falls AFB, Montana, 1 June 1948 – 1 May 1953

Reassigned to: Brookley AFB, Alabama, 1 May 1953 – 18 June 1957

- 1703d Air Transport Group, Brookley AFB, Alabama, 1 October 1948 – 18 June 1957
- 1705th Air Transport Group, McChord AFB, Washington, 1 August 1950

Reassigned to: North Pacific Air Transport Wing, (Provisional), 1 October 1951 – 1 January 1952
Reassigned to: 1705th Air Transport Group, 1 January 1952 – 18 June 1960
Personnel and equipment reassigned to: 62d Troop Carrier Wing, 18 June 1960
Redesignated: 62d Air Transport Wing, 1 January 1965
Redesignated: 62d Military Airlift Wing, Military Airlift Command, 8 January 1966

- 1707th Air Transport Wing, Palm Beach AFB, Florida, 1 September 1951

Reassigned to: Tinker AFB, Oklahoma, 1 July 1959 – 8 January 1966
Personnel and equipment reassigned to: 443d Military Airlift Wing, Military Airlift Command, 8 January 1966

Note: 4-digit Military Air Transport Service units at all levels were considered Major Command (MAJCOM) provisional units by the USAF due to MATS being a Department of Defense Unified Command. Under the USAF lineage system they did not a permanent lineage or history and were discontinued upon inactivation.

==== Troop Carrier Units ====
On 1 July 1957 a reorganization of USAF troop carrier forces included the transfer of Tactical Air Command Eighteenth Air Force heavy-lift C-124 Globemaster II units to MATS. However, the units retained their troop carrier designation and remained dedicated to support TAC on worldwide troop deployments.

- 62d Troop Carrier Group, Larson AFB, Washington, 1 July 1957 – 18 June 1960
- 62d Troop Carrier Wing, McChord AFB, Washington, 18 June 1960

Redesignated: 62d Air Transport Wing, Heavy, on 1 January 1965
Redesignated: 62d Military Airlift Wing, Military Airlift Command, 8 January 1966

- 61st Troop Carrier Group, Donaldson AFB, South Carolina, 1 July 1957 – 8 October 1959
- 63d Troop Carrier Group, Donaldson AFB, South Carolina, 1 July 1957 – 18 January 1963
- 63d Troop Carrier Wing, Hunter AFB, Georgia, 18 January 1963 – 8 January 1966

Redesignated: 63d Military Airlift Wing, Military Airlift Command, 8 January 1966

=== Station facilities ===
Upon its establishment, Military Air Transport Service inherited much of Air Transport Command's worldwide network of stations and transport routes. By the time of its disestablishment, MATS had closed its facilities at many of these stations; however, some are still in use today by Air Mobility Command in support of United States interests around the world.

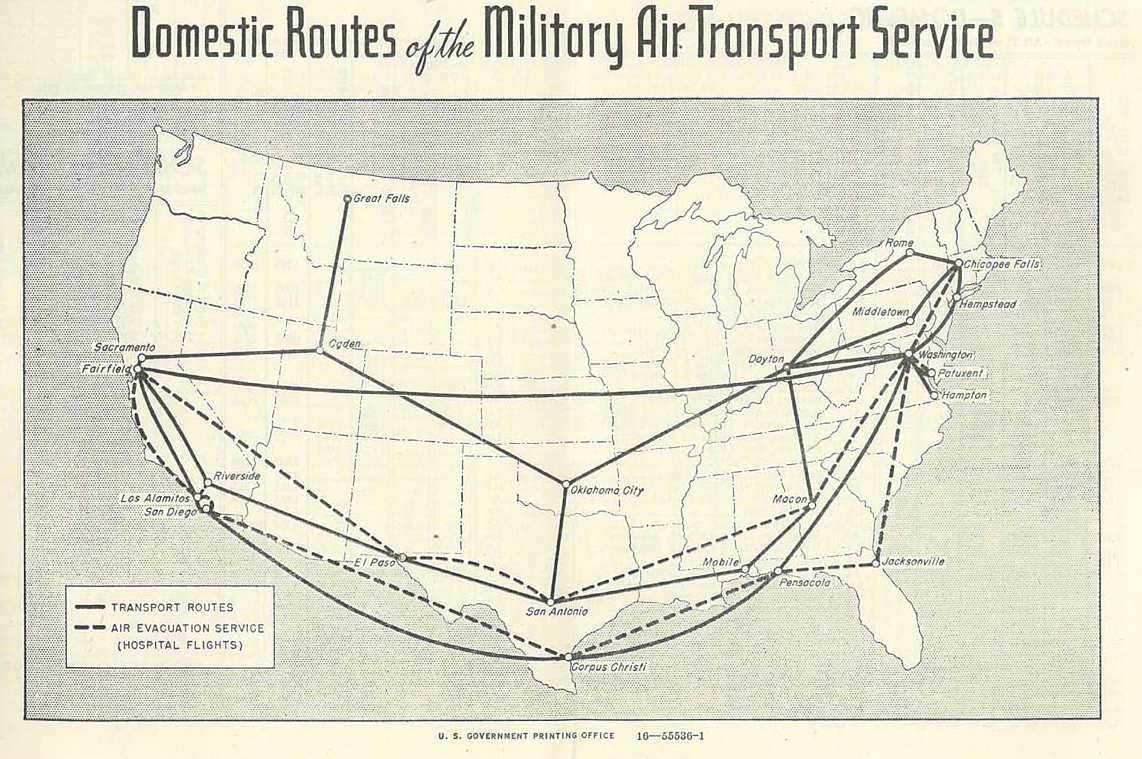
MATS Domestic routes, 1948

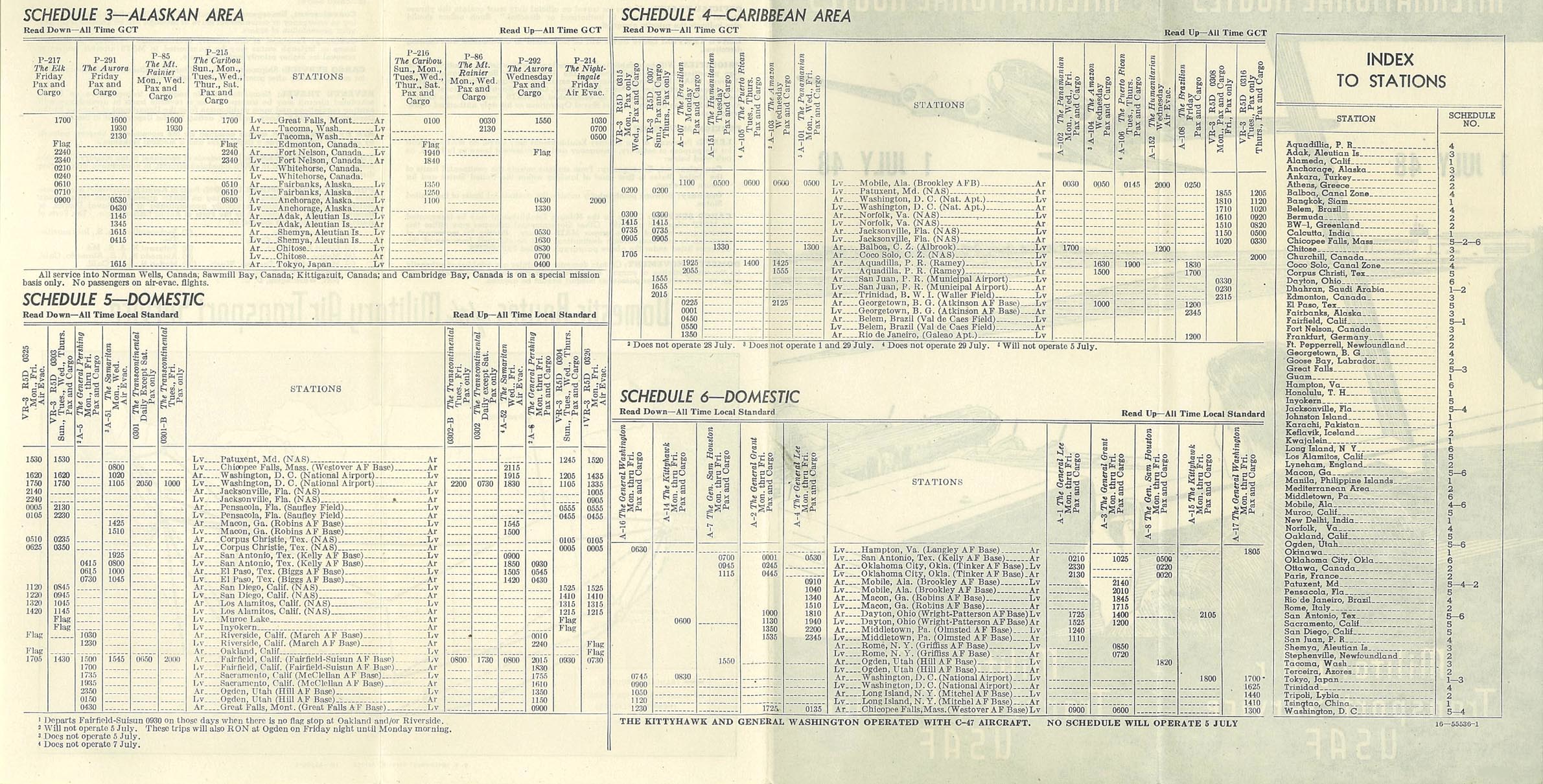
1948 MATS Route Timetable within the Americas

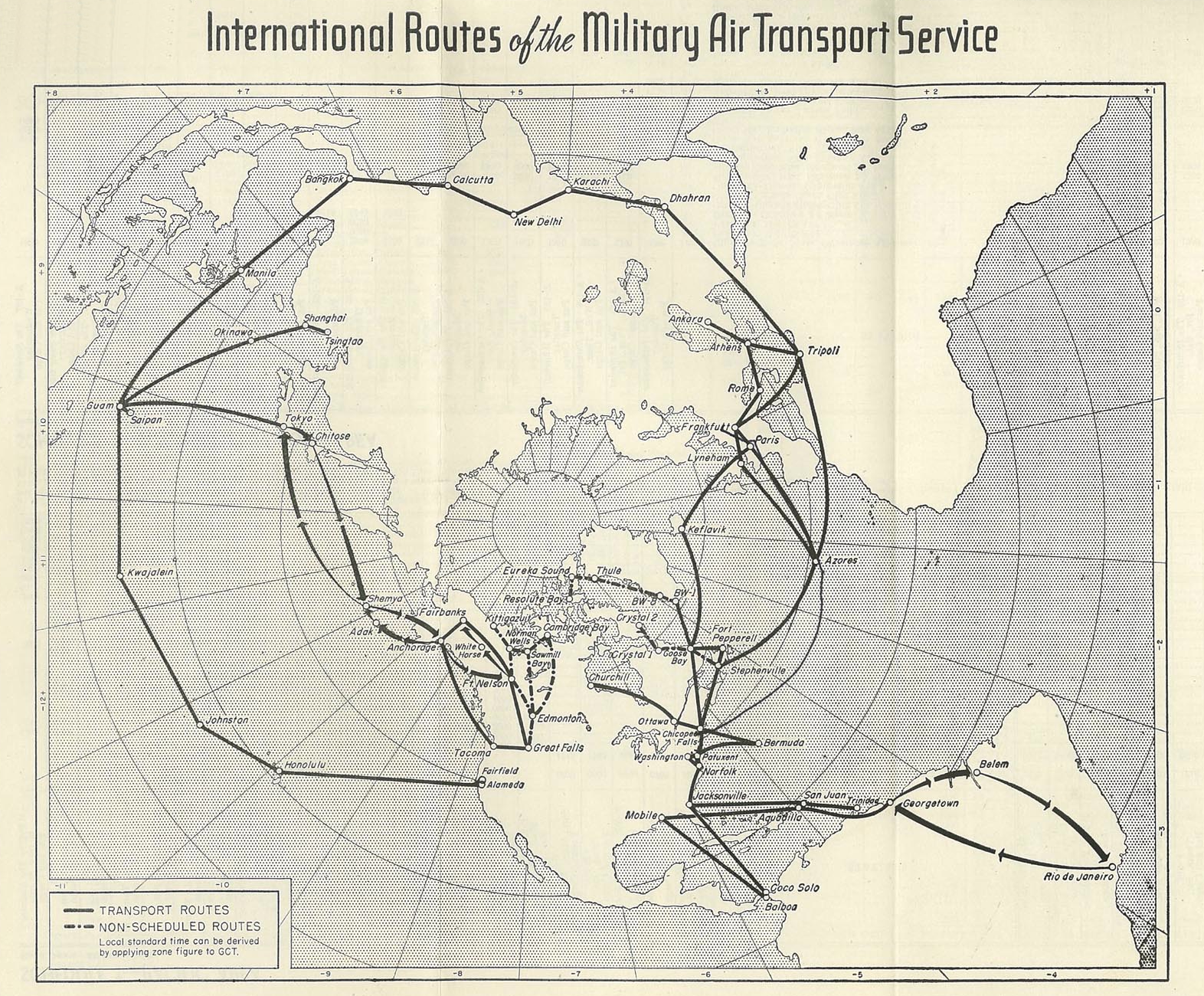
MATS International routes, 1948

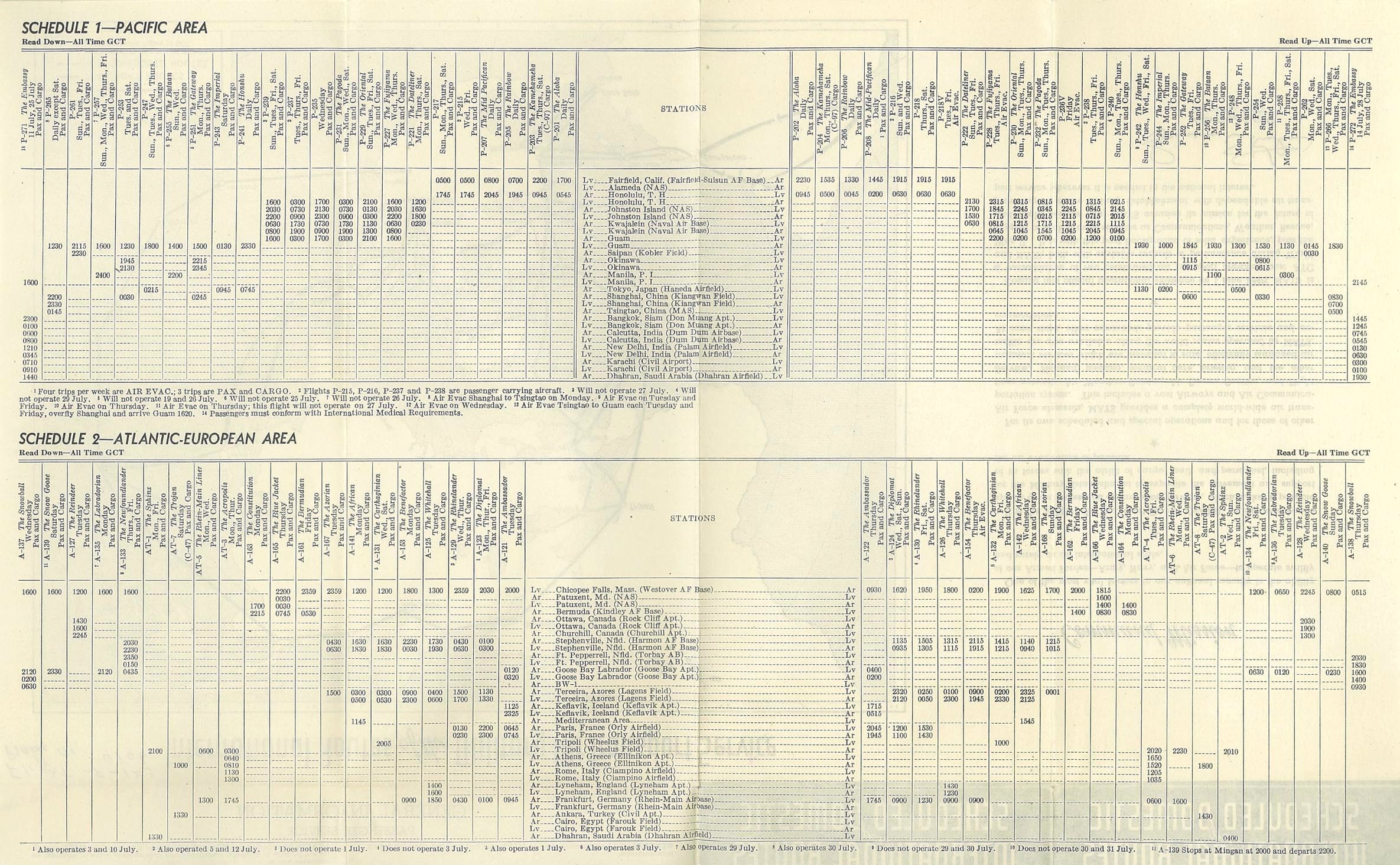
1948 MATS Overseas Route Timetable

- United States

Biggs AFB, Texas
Griffiss AFB, New York
Hill AFB, Utah
Langley AFB, Virginia
March AFB, California
McClellan AFB, California
Mitchel AFB, New York
Muroc (Edwards) AFB, California
NAS Alameda, California
NAS Corpus Christi, Texas
NAS Norfolk, Virginia
NAS Oakland, California
NAS Jacksonville, Florida
NAS Patuxent River, Maryland
NAS San Diego, California
National Airport, Washington, D.C.
NOTS China Lake, California
Olmsted AFB, Pennsylvania
Robins AFB, Georgia
NAS Saufley Field, Florida
Tinker AFB, Oklahoma
Wright-Patterson AFB, Ohio

- Alaska

Elmendorf AFB, Anchorage
Ladd AFB, Fairbanks
NAS Adak, Aleutian Islands
Shemya AFB, Aleutian Islands

- Canada

Churchill Airport, Manitoba
Edmonton Airport, Alberta
Ernest Harmon AFB, Newfoundland
Fort Nelson/Gordon Field Airport, British Columbia
Goose AFB, Labrador
Ottawa/Rockcliffe Airport, Ontario
Torbay Air Base, Newfoundland
Whitehorse Airport, Yukon

- Caribbean/South America

Atkinson Field, Georgetown, British Guiana
Albrook AFB, Canal Zone
Coco Solo, Canal Zone
Galeão Airport, Rio de Janeiro, Brazil
San Juan Municipal Airport, Puerto Rico
Ramey AFB, Puerto Rico
Val de Cães Field, Belém, Brazil
Waller AFB, Trinidad

- Atlantic Ocean Region

Bluie West One (Narsarsuaq Air Base), Greenland
Keflavík Air Base, Iceland
Kindley AFB, Bermuda
Lagens Field, Azores

- Pacific Ocean Region

Andersen AFB, Guam
Kwajalein Airport, Marshall Islands
Kobler Field, Saipan 15°07′22.188″N 145°42′14.8″E
NAS Johnston Island, USMOI

- Asia

Chitose Air Base, Hokkaidō, Japan
Clark AB, Luzon, Philippines
Don Muang RTAFB, Bangkok, Thailand
Dum Dum Airport, Calcutta, India
Haneda Airfield, Tokyo, Japan
Kadena Airfield, Okinawa
Karachi Airport, Pakistan
Kiangwan Airfield, Shanghai, china
MCAS Tsingtao, China
Palam Airfield, Delhi, India

- Europe/Africa/Middle East

Ankara Esenboğa Airport, Turkey
Ciampino Airport, Rome, Italy
Dhahran Airfield, Saudi Arabia
Farouk Field, Cairo, Egypt
Hellenikon Air Base, Athens, Greece
RAF Lyneham, England
To: RAF Burtonwood, England, 1950
To: RAF Mildenhall, England, 1959
Prestwick, Scotland
Rhein-Main AB, Germany (later:West Germany)
Orly Air Base, Paris, France
Wheelus Air Base, Libya

=== Major aircraft assigned ===
- C-141A Starlifter, 1965
- C-130 Hercules, 1956–1965
- C-135 Stratolifter, 1961–1965
- C-133 Cargomaster, 1957–1965
- C-124 Globemaster II, 1950–1965
- C-118 Liftmaster, 1948–1965
- C-121 Super Constellation, 1948–1965
- C-74 Globemaster, 1948–1965
- C-97 Stratofreighter, 1948–1965
- C-54 Skymaster, 1948–1965
- C-47 Skytrain, 1948–1965
- C-131 Samaritan, 1950–1990
- VC-137, 1962–1965

Used by Special Air Mission

- RC-130 Hercules, 1957–1965

Used by Air Photographic and Charting Service

- Various Helicopters/Utility aircraft: HH-43; HH-19; HH-21; HU-16 Albatross; SB-17 Flying Fortress; SB-29/B-29 Superfortress

Used by Air Rescue Service, Air Resupply And Communications Service

- WB-47 Stratojet; WB-50 Superfortress

Used by Air Weather Service

=== Accidents and incidents ===
- On 22 March 1955, a U.S. Navy Douglas R6D-1 Liftmaster, BuNo 131612, operating a MATS flight from Tokyo, Japan, to Travis Air Force Base, California, via Hickam Air Force Base, Territory of Hawaii, flew into a mountain peak in Hawaii, killing all 66 people – 55 military passengers, two civilian passengers, and a Navy crew of nine – on board. It remains both the deadliest aviation accident in the history of Hawaii and the worst heavier-than-air accident in the history of U.S. naval aviation.
- On 10 October 1956, a U.S. Navy Douglas R6D-1 Liftmaster, BuNo 131588, operating a MATS flight from RAF Lakenheath, England, to Lajes Field in the Azores disappeared over the Atlantic Ocean, killing all 59 people – 50 U.S. Air Force passengers from the 305th Bombardment Wing and a Navy crew of nine – on board. A search discovered wreckage from the aircraft floating in the Atlantic, but no survivors or bodies ever were found.
