= 89th Airlift Wing =

US Air Force unit transporting senior officials

89th Airlift Wing

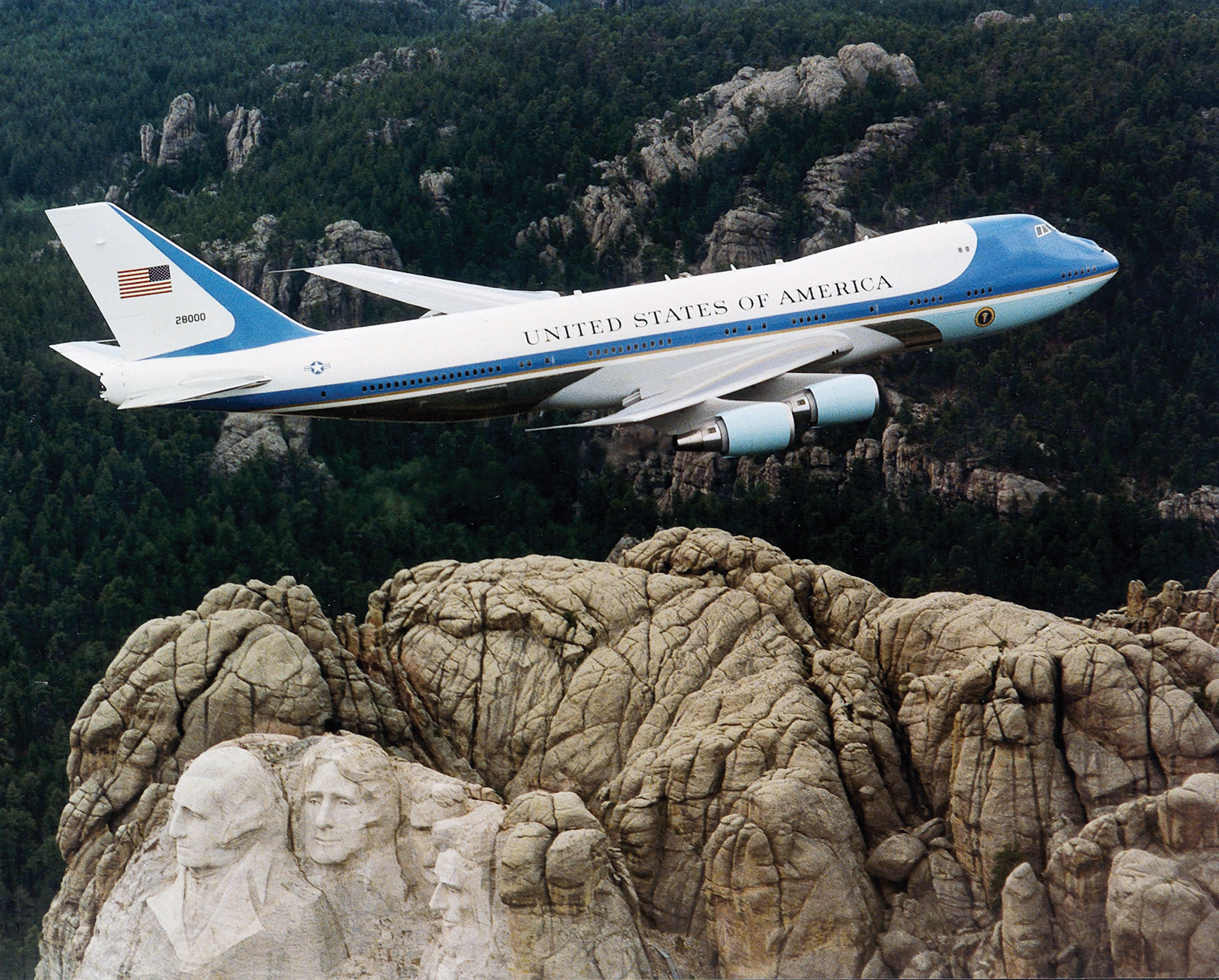
- USAF VC-25 flying over Mount Rushmore
- Active: 1949–1951; 1952–1957; 1966–present
- Country: United States
- Branch: United States Air Force
- Role: Special Air Mission Airlift
- Part of: Air Mobility Command: Eighteenth Air Force
- Garrison/HQ: Joint Base Andrews, Maryland
- Mottos: Experto crede (Latin: "Trust one who has had experience")
- Engagements: Global war on terrorism

- Decorations: Air Force Meritorious Unit Award Air Force Outstanding Unit Award

Commanders
- Current commander: Colonel Christopher M. Robinson
- Notable commanders: Arthur Lichte; Jacqueline Van Ovost

Insignia
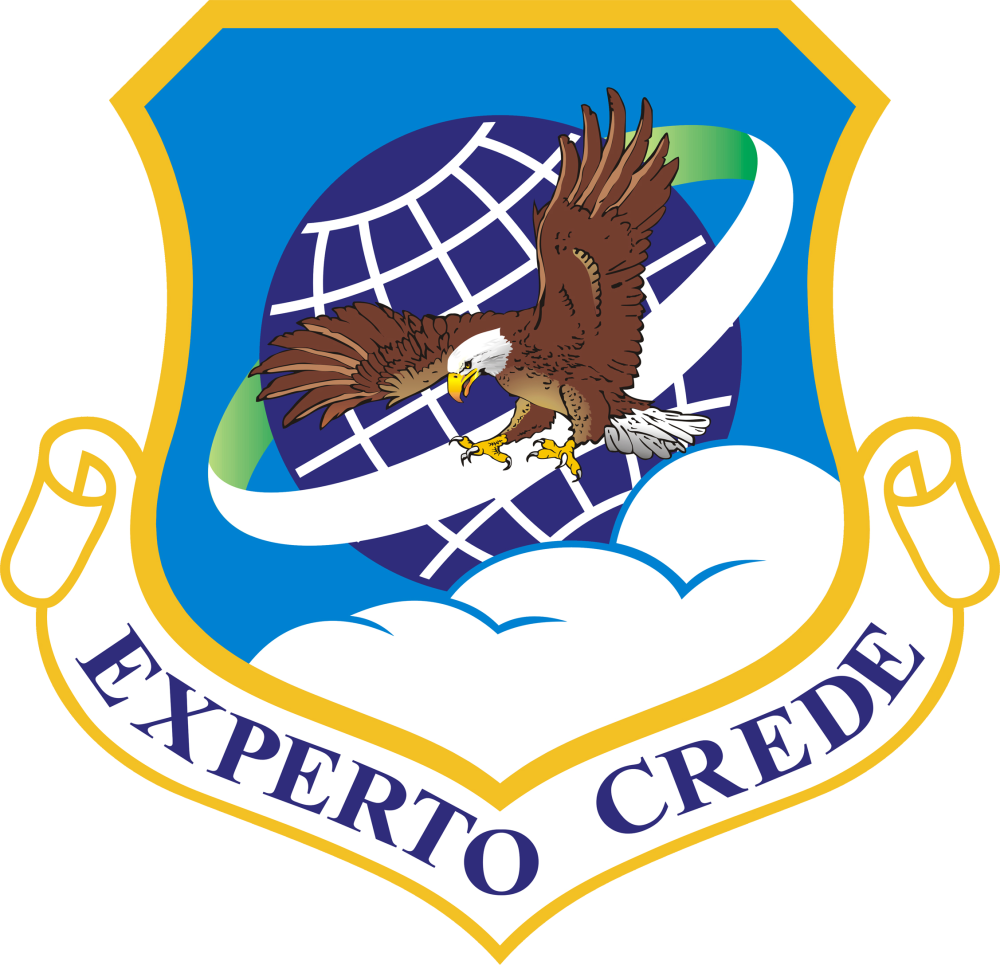
- 89th Airlift Wing emblem (approved 15 September 1993)

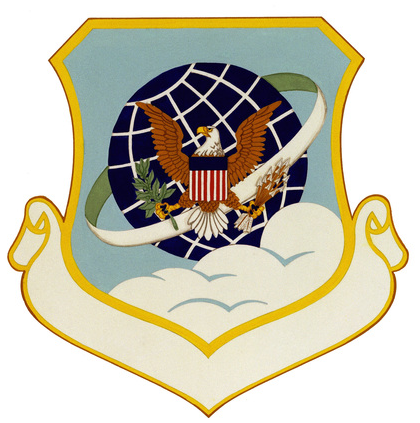
- 89th Military Airlift Wing emblem (approved 22 June 1989)

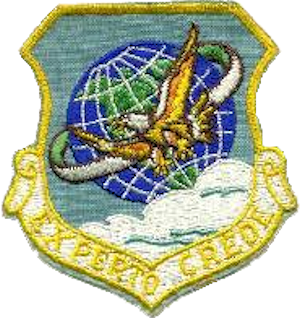
- Patch with 89th Military Airlift Wing emblem (approved 28 April 1966) (Note: When the 89th Wing replaced the 1254th Air Transport Wing in 1966, it adopted the emblem approved for the 1254th Wing on 8 September 1955.)

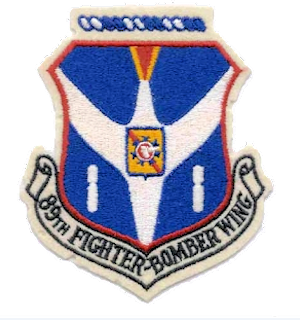
- Patch with 89th Fighter-Bomber Wing emblem (approved 12 March 1953)

The 89th Airlift Wing of the United States Air Force is based at Joint Base Andrews and has an operational force of over 1,000 personnel. The 89th provides global Special Air Mission (SAM) airlift, logistics, aerial transport and communications for the president, vice president, combatant commanders, senior leaders and the global mobility system as tasked by the White House, chief of staff of the Air Force, and Air Mobility Command.

== Components ==
- 89th Maintenance Group (89 MXG)
  - 89th Aerial Port Squadron (89 APS)
  - 89th Aircraft Maintenance Squadron (89 AMXS)
- 89th Operations Group (89 OG)
  - 1st Airlift Squadron – C-32, C-40
  - 99th Airlift Squadron – C-37
  - 89th Operations Support Squadron (89 OSS)
  - 89th Communication Squadron (89 CS)
- Presidential Airlift Group – VC-25
  - Presidential Airlift Squadron
  - Presidential Logistics Squadron

== History ==
=== Activation in the reserve and Korean War mobilization ===
The wing was first activated as the 89th Troop Carrier Wing at Hanscom Field, Massachusetts in June 1949, when Continental Air Command reorganized its reserve tactical units under the wing base organization. The wing drew its cadre from the 3d Air Division, which was simultaneously inactivated.

The wing trained at Hanscom under the supervision of the 2234th Air Force Reserve Training Center for troop carrier operations. Although its 89th Troop Carrier Group was assigned four squadrons, rather than the three authorized for active duty groups, it was only manned at 25% of its authorized strength.

The 89th, along with all reserve combat units, was mobilized for the Korean war. It was called to active duty on 1 May 1951 and its personnel and aircraft were distributed to other organizations to bring them to full strength. The wing was inactivated on 10 May 1951.

=== Reserve fighter operations ===
The reserve mobilization for the Korean War left the reserve without aircraft, and reserve units did not receive aircraft until July 1952. Continental Air Command redesignated the wing the 89th Fighter-Bomber Wing and activated it at Hanscom, where it drew its personnel from the 913th Reserve Training Wing, a non-flying training organization, which had been activated at Hanscom in July 1951. Although titled a fighter bomber unit, the wing initially had an air defense role, only later assuming a tactical fighter mission. The wing initially equipped with propeller-driven North American P-51 Mustangs, but in 1953 began to equip with Lockheed P-80 Shooting Stars. By 1957 it began to receive North American F-86 Sabres.

In the mid-1950s, the Joint Chiefs of Staff were pressuring the Air Force to provide more wartime airlift. At the same time, about 150 Fairchild C-119 Flying Boxcars became available from the active force. Consequently, in November 1956 the Air Force directed Continental Air Command to convert three reserve fighter bomber wings, including the 89th, to the troop carrier mission by September 1957. In addition, within the Air Staff was a recommendation that the reserve fighter mission given to the Air National Guard and replaced by the troop carrier mission. Although the wing began to receive Fairchild C-119 Flying Boxcars in 1957, it was inactivated in November and its personnel and equipment were transferred to the 94th Troop Carrier Wing, which moved on paper to Hanscom from Dobbins Air Force Base, Georgia.

=== Special Mission airlift ===
In January 1966, wing assumed the personnel and equipment of 1254th Air Transport Wing and served as a special mission airlift wing charged with providing worldwide airlift for the Executive Department and high-ranking dignitaries of the U.S. Government and of foreign governments, as directed. (In taking over the special airlift mission, it replaced the 1254th Air Transport Wing, which had previously undertaken the task at Andrews from 1 October 1948 to 1966.) It assumed an additional mission of controlling all T-39 administrative airlift within the United States from 1975 to 1978 and continued maintenance support to 1984. It gained a helicopter squadron in July 1976 and added rescue and medical evacuation (in the Washington, D.C. area) to its mission. In October 1976, the wing began training C-12 pilots for units in Alaska and Germany, and for duty with defense attaché offices and military assistance units.

The 89th was reduced in size in 1977 through transfer of many aircraft and inactivation of units, and became a group on 30 September 1977. The 89th was redesignated in 1980 as a selectively manned wing. In addition to primary mission of airlifting the president, vice president, cabinet members, other high U.S. government officials, and foreign dignitaries, the wing frequently participated in humanitarian missions in the U.S. and abroad. It provided transport for personnel and supplies to Southwest Asia from 1990 to 1991. In 1991, the 89th airlifted home 20 former prisoners of war from Iraqi captivity. It became host wing of Andrews Air Force Base in July 1991 and subsequently relinquished that responsibility to the 316th Wing in 2006.

== Lineage ==
- Established as the 89th Troop Carrier Wing, Medium on 10 May 1949

Activated in the reserve on 27 June 1949
Ordered to active service on 1 May 1951
Inactivated on 10 May 1951

- Redesignated 89th Fighter-Bomber Wing on 26 May 1952

Activated in the reserve on 14 June 1952
Inactivated on 16 November 1957

- Redesignated 89th Military Airlift Wing, Special Mission and activated on 27 December 1965 (not organized)

Organized on 8 January 1966
Redesignated 89th Military Airlift Group on 30 September 1977
Redesignated 89th Military Airlift Wing on 15 December 1980
Redesignated 89th Airlift Wing on 12 July 1991

=== Assignments ===
- First Air Force, 27 June 1949 – 10 May 1951
- First Air Force, 14 June 1952 – 16 November 1957
- Military Air Transport Service (later Military Airlift Command), 27 December 1965 (not organized until 8 January 1966)
- 76th Airlift Division, 1 July 1976
- 76th Military Airlift Wing, 30 September 1977
- 76th Airlift Division, 15 December 1980
- Twenty-First Air Force, 1 October 1985
- Eighteenth Air Force, 1 October 2003 – present

=== Components ===
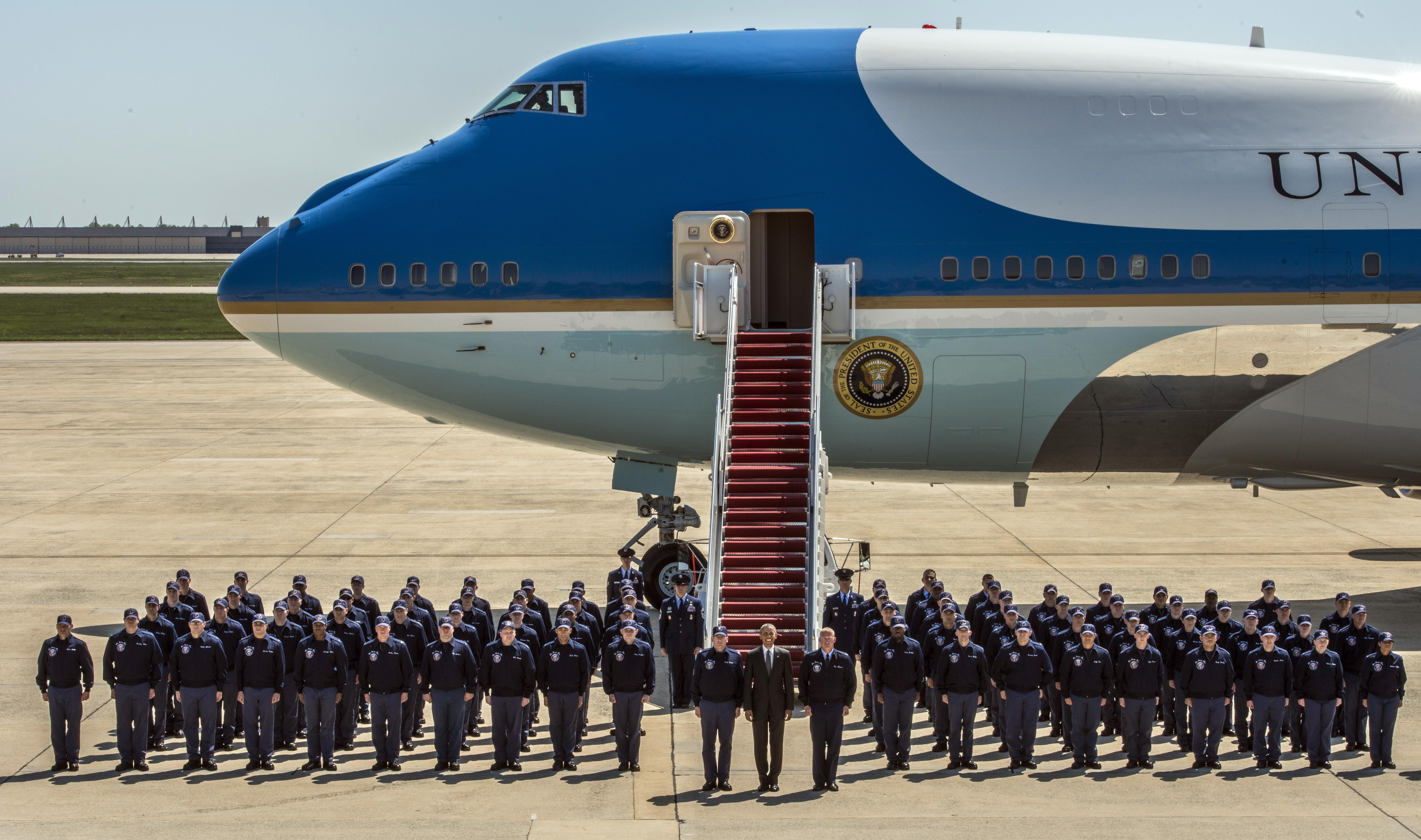
President Obama posing with members of the Presidential Logistics Squadron in 2015

Groups

- 89th Maintenance Group: ? – present
- 89th Operations Group: 12 July 1991 - present
- Presidential Airlift Group: 1 April 2001 – present
- 89th Airlift Support Group: 22 June 2006 – 12 June 2025
- 89th Troop Carrier Group (later 89th Fighter-Bomber Group, 89th Operations Group): 27 June 1949 – 10 May 1951; 14 June 1952 – 16 November 1957; 12 July 1991 –present

Squadrons

- 1st Helicopter Squadron: 1 July 1976 – 12 July 1991
- 1st Military Airlift Squadron: 12 September 1977 – 12 July 1991
- 98th Military Airlift Squadron: 8 January 1966 – 1 September 1977
- 99th Military Airlift Squadron: 8 Jan 1966 – 12 July 1991
- 1400th Military Airlift Squadron: 1 April 1975 – 15 March 1978
- 1401st Military Airlift Squadron: 1 April 1975 – 15 March 1978
- 1402d Military Airlift Squadron: 1 April 1975 – 15 March 1978

=== Stations ===
- Hanscom Field, Massachusetts, 27 June 1949 – 10 May 1951
- Hanscom Field, Massachusetts, 14 June 1952 – 16 November 1957
- Andrews Air Force Base, Maryland, 8 January 1966 – present

=== Aircraft ===
- Beechcraft C-45 Expeditor (1949–1950, 1955–1957)
- Curtiss C-46 Commando (1949–1952, 1956–1957)
- North American T-6 Texan (1949–1950)
- Beechcraft T-7 Navigator (1949–1954)
- Beechcraft T-11 Kansan (1949–1952)
- North American P-51 Mustang (1952–1954)
- North American T-28 Trojan (1953–1956)
- Lockheed T-33 T-Bird (1953–1957)
- Lockheed P-80 Shooting Star (1953–1957)
- Douglas TC-47 Skytrain (1955–1957)
- North American F-86 Sabre (1957)
- Fairchild C-119 Flying Boxcar (1957)
- Douglas C-118 Liftmaster (1966–1972)
- Douglas VC-118 The Independence (1966–1974)
- Lockheed C-121 Constellation (1966–1968)
- Lockheed VC-121 Constellation (1966)
- Convair C-131 Samaritan (1966)
- Convair VC-131 (1966–1979)
- Boeing C-135 Stratolifter (1966–1968, 1975–1992)
- Boeing VC-137 Stratoliner (1966–2001)
- Lockheed C-140 Jetstar (1966–1972)
- Lockheed VC-140 Jetstar (1966–1987)
- Beechcraft VC-6 King Air (1966–1985)
- Aero Commander U-4 (1966–1969)
- Boeing VC-135 (1968–1992)
- McDonnell Douglas VC-9C (1975–2005)
- North American T-39 Sabreliner (1975–1978)
- Bell UH-1 Huey (1976–2006)
- Sikorsky CH-3 (1976–1988)
- Beechcraft C-12 Huron (1976–1993)
- Gulfstream C-20 (1983–present)
- Boeing VC-25 (1990–present)
- Learjet C-21 (1993–1997)
- Boeing C-32 (1998–present)
- Gulfstream C-37A Gulfstream V (1998–present)
- Boeing C-40 Clipper (2002–present)

== Honors and awards ==
Service streamers:

- World War II American Theater
- Global War on Terrorism Service Streamer, 11 Sep 2001-present

Meritorious Unit Award:

- 1 Jul 2011-30 Jun 2012

Air and Space Outstanding Unit Awards:

- 1 Jul 1966-30 Jun 1968
- 1 Jul 1968-30 Jun 1970
- 1 Jul 1970-30 Jun 1972
- 1 Jul 1972-30 Jun 1974
- 1 Jul 1974-31 Dec 1975
- 1 Jan 1976-31 Jan 1977
- 6 Apr 1977-18 May 1979
- 1 Jul 1987-30 Jun 1989
- 1 Jul 1989-30 Jun 1991
- 1 Jul 1991-30 Jun 1992
- 1 Jul 1992-30 Jun 1994
- 1 Jul 1994-30 Jun 1996
- 1 Jul 1996-30 Jun 1998
- 1 Jul 1998-30 Jun 2000
- 1 Jul 2000-30 Jun 2002
- 1 Jul 2002-30 Jun 2004
- 1 Jul 2004-30 Jun 2005
- 1 Jul 2005-30 Jun 2006
- 1 Jul 2006-30 Jun 2007
- 1 Jul 2007-30 Jun 2008
- 1 Jul 2008-30 Jun 2009
- 1 Jul 2009-30 Jun 2011
- 1 Jul 2013-30 Jun 2015
- 1 Jul 2016-30 Jun 2017
- 1 Jul 2018-30 Jun 2019
- 1 Aug 2023-31 Jul 2024
