= Special Air Mission =

U.S. governmental flight service

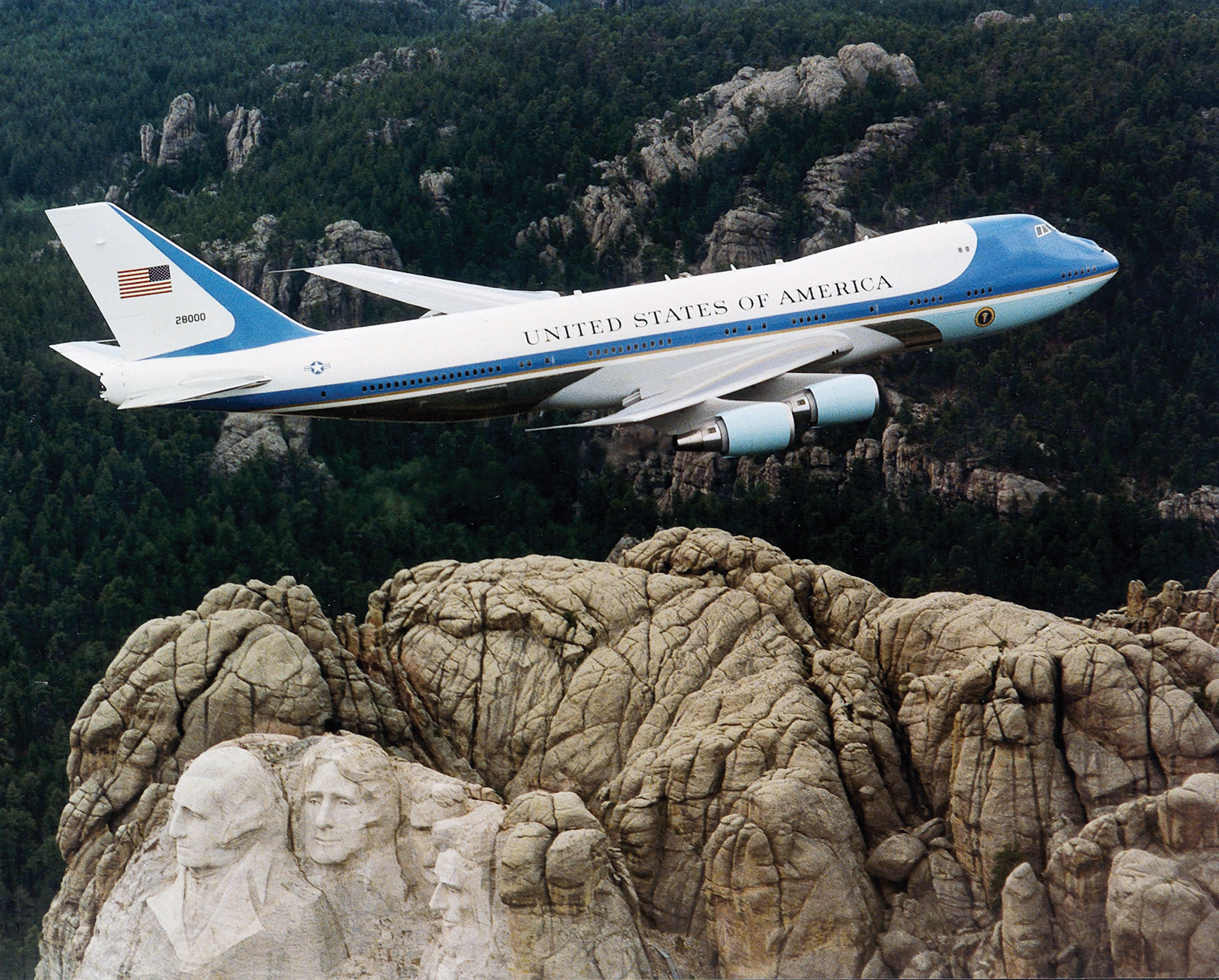
- SAM 28000 over Mount Rushmore, one of the two VC-25s used by the Special Air Mission as Air Force One
- Active: 1948–present
- Country: United States
- Branch: United States Air Force
- Role: Presidential Transport; Executive Branch Transport; Congressional Transport; Distinguished Visitor Transport
- Part of: Air Mobility Command
- Garrison/HQ: Andrews Air Force Base, Maryland

Insignia
- Air Mobility Command emblem

The United States Air Force Special Air Mission provides air transportation for the president of the United States (POTUS), vice president of the United States (VPOTUS), first lady of the United States (FLOTUS), presidential cabinet, U.S. congressional delegations (CODELs), and other high-ranking American and foreign dignitaries.

The Special Air Mission is under the cognizance of the Air Mobility Command (AMC) and executed by the 89th Airlift Wing (89 AW) based at Andrews Air Force Base, Maryland.

== Mission ==
The 89th Airlift Wing provides the U.S. government's flight service with seventeen aircraft dedicated to the SAM and fifteen helicopters supporting federal emergency requirements. They use civilian airports almost exclusively.

SAM mission areas may be divided into the following categories:

- Presidential mission: A mission directed by the White House to transport the president of the United States or members of the first family.
- Special Air Mission: A mission operated by the 89th Airlift Wing by direction of the USAF vice chief of staff (CVAM). Primary passengers are the vice president, cabinet secretaries, and senior officials of the executive branch, as well as congressional delegations and foreign senior political leaders.
- Helicopter Special Mission: The mission of the 1st Helicopter Squadron (1 HS) is to provide emergency helicopter transportation for officials of Office of the Secretary of Defense (OSD), the Joint Chiefs of Staff (JCS), the militarysServices and the civil departments of the federal government to relocation sites during a national crisis.

=== Special Air Mission ===
After a presidential inauguration resulting in a change in office, the outgoing president is provided transport on a VC-25 aircraft to their home destination. The aircraft for this flight does not use the Air Force One call sign because it is not carrying the president in office. For presidents Bill Clinton and George W. Bush the flight was known as Special Air Mission 28000, where the number represents the aircraft's tail number. For President Barack Obama, the Special Air Mission flight used the call sign SAM 44, as Obama was the 44th President. George H. W. Bush's coffin was transported on a flight using the call sign Special Air Mission 41, as he was the forty-first president. President Donald Trump took his last flight to Mar-a-Lago before President Joe Biden's inauguration, thus still under the call sign Air Force One.

== Special Assignment Air Mission ==
Special Assignment Airlift Mission (SAAM) are aircraft operated by units other than by the 89th Airlift Wing to satisfy a requirement needing special pickup or delivery at locations other than those established within the approved channel structure; or to satisfy a requirement needing special consideration because of the number of passengers, weight, or size of the cargo, urgency, or sensitivity of movement, or other special factors.

These missions are designated:

- PHOENIX BANNER – SAAM supporting the president of the United States (POTUS); primary aircraft employs call sign of "Air Force One" when POTUS is aboard.
- PHOENIX SILVER – SAAM supporting the vice president of the United States (VPOTUS); primary aircraft employs call sign of "Air Force Two" when VPOTUS is aboard.
- PHOENIX COPPER – SAAM supporting the United States Secret Service (USSS) when not supporting the president or vice president, i.e., SAAM for the First Lady of the United States (FLOTUS), etc.

Standby force definitions are expanded as follows when constituted in support of PHOENIX BANNER or PHOENIX SILVER missions:

- BRAVO Standby. Aircraft and aircrew capable of departing 3+00 hours after notification for C-130 and C-17 and 3+45 hours for C-5.
- ALFA Standby. Aircraft and aircrew capable of departing 1+00-hour after notification for C-130, and C-17 and 1+45 hours for C-5.

To support short-notice PHOENIX BANNER and PHOENIX SILVER missions, AMC maintains aircraft and augmented aircrews on standby at various locations. Specific missions may require standby C-5, C-17, or C-130 aircraft. When the cargo load requires a C-5 (i.e., airlift of U.S. Marine Corps helicopters in the "Marine One" role operated by Marine Helicopter Squadron ONE (HMX-1)), a C-5 will be used to back up the mission. Aircraft selected to fly these missions must meet the highest standards of reliability and must not have an uncorrected history of repeat or recurring malfunctions. Missions are extensively coordinated and any delay has serious effect on mission support. PHOENIX BANNER, PHOENIX SILVER, and PHOENIX COPPER missions are of high level interest and must get special attention in accordance with established CLOSE WATCH procedures. Any problems that affect the mission will be immediately brought to the attention of the 618th Air and Space Operations Center (Tanker Airlift Control Center) for AMC controlled assets or the theater Air Mobility Operations Control Center (AMOCC) in a theater Air and Space Operations Center (AOC) for theater controlled assets.

== History ==
=== Lineage ===
- Established as Special Airlift Mission on 10 March 1948

Redesignated as Special Air Mission on 12 July 1991

=== Assignments ===
- Bolling Field Command, 10 March 1948 – 1 June 1948
- Military Air Transport Service (MATS), 1 June 1948 – 1 January 1966
- Military Airlift Command (MAC), 1 January 1966 – 1 June 1992
- Air Mobility Command (AMC), 1 June 1992–present

=== Stations ===
- Bolling Air Force Base, District of Columbia, 10 March 1948 – 10 July 1961

Operations originated from Washington National Airport

- Andrews Air Force Base, Maryland, 10 July 1961–present

=== Components ===
Wings

- 1100th Special Air Missions Wing, 1 July 1951 – 10 July 1961
- 1254th Air Transport Wing, 10 July 1961 – 8 January 1966
- 89th Military Airlift Wing, Special Mission, 8 January 1966

Redesignated: 89th Military Airlift Group on 30 September 1977
Redesignated: 89th Military Airlift Wing on 15 December 1980
Redesignated: 89th Airlift Wing on 12 July 1991

Groups

- 89th Operations Group, 12 July 1991–present
- Presidential Airlift Group, 1 April 2001–present
- 16th Special Air Missions Group

Redesignated: 1100th Special Air Missions Group
Redesignated: 2310th Air Transport Group, 10 March 1948 – 29 November 1952

Squadrons

- 1st Helicopter Squadron: 1 July 1976–present
- 1st Airlift Squadron: 12 September 1977–present
- 99th Airlift Squadron: 8 January 1966–12 September 1977; 1 October 1988–present
- Presidential Airlift Squadron, 1 April 2001–present
- 1st Special Air Missions Squadron

Redesignated: 1111th Special Air Mission Squadron
Redesignated: 1299th Air Transport Squadron, 10 March 1948–10 July 1961

- 98th Military Airlift Squadron: 8 January 1966 – 1 September 1977
- 457th Airlift Squadron: 1 April 1993 – 1 April 1995
- 1400th Military Airlift Squadron: 1 April 1975 – 15 March 1978
- 1401st Military Airlift Squadron: 1 April 1975 – 15 March 1978
- 1402d Military Airlift Squadron: 1 April 1975 – 15 March 1978

=== Aircraft ===
- C-118 Liftmaster (1966–1972)
- VC-118 The Independence (1966–1974)
- C-121 Constellation (1966–1968)
- VC-121 (1966)
- C-131 Samaritan (1966)
- VC-131 (1966–1979)
- C-135 Stratolifter (1966–1968, 1975–1992)
- VC-137 Stratoliner (1966–2001)
- C-140 (1966–1972)
- VC-140 (1966–1987)
- VC-6 (1966–1985)
- U-4 (1966–1969)
- VC-135 (1968–1992)
- VC-9 (1975–2005)
- T-39 Sabreliner (1975–1978)
- UH-1 Iroquois (1976–present)
- CH-3 Jolly Green Giant (1976–1988)
- C-12 Huron (1976–1993)
- C-20 (1983–present)
- VC-25A (1991–present)
- C-21 (1993–1997)
- C-32A (1998–present)
- C-37 (1998–present)
- C-40 Clipper (2002–present)

The distinctive "UNITED STATES OF AMERICA" livery present on Special Air Mission aircraft was designed by Raymond Loewy.

=== Operations ===
The Special Air Mission originated with the World War II United States Army Air Forces' 10th Ferrying Squadron (AAFFC) in 1941. It was redesigned as the 21st Transport Transition Training Detachment of Air Transport Command (ATC) in 1942, and later redesignated as the 26th Transport Group. From September to December 1943, the 26th TG conducted the C-87 "Fireball" run, a weekly priority spare parts delivery flight between Fairfield, Ohio and Agra, India. It was lastly redesignated as the 503d Army Air Force Base Unit (AAFBU) in 1944. The last unit was part of the ATC North Atlantic Division. In 1946, it is known that the 503d AAFBU was involved in the transport of personnel to Bikini Atoll as part of the Atomic Bomb Testing mission.

When President Franklin D. Roosevelt flew to the Casablanca Conference in 1943 on board a commercial Boeing 314 Clipper Ship, he became the first U.S. president to fly while in office. Concerned about relying upon commercial airlines to transport the president, the USAAF leaders ordered the conversion of a military aircraft to accommodate the special needs of the Commander in Chief. In 1942, a modified B-24 Liberator (designated C-87A) was prepared for the use of President Roosevelt, however it was never used by him. The First Lady, Eleanor Roosevelt, however used the aircraft extensively in her travels around the United States and overseas to visit servicemen overseas.

After experiencing difficulties with the C-87, the USAAF arranged with Douglas Aircraft to construct a new transport aircraft specifically for presidential use. Nicknamed the "Sacred Cow", this modified C-54 Skymaster (VC-54C), which included a vertical lift in the lower fuselage for the President and his wheelchair, became the first military aircraft to transport a U.S. president when President Roosevelt took it to the Soviet Union for the Yalta Conference in February 1945. President Roosevelt used the Sacred Cow only once before his death in April 1945; however, the Sacred Cow remained in presidential service during the first 27 months of the Truman Administration. On 26 July 1947, President Truman signed the National Security Act of 1947 while on board the Sacred Cow. This act established the U.S. Air Force as an independent service, making the Sacred Cow the "birthplace" of the USAF.

Following the increased development of commercial air travel after World War II, Americans once again took to the air. Commercial airlines, made anemic under prohibitive wartime flying regulations and rationing of airplane fuel, were restored to vigor after the war with many World War II military aircraft being sold cheap to anyone with an idea to open an airway in the sky.

The result was too many civilian aircraft and not enough airfields to support them. This meant many government civilians couldn't get to where they needed to go on time. The Special Air Mission was created to ensure military airplanes were available to transport government employees between military bases. SAM Aircraft also had priority to land at civilian airfields, although this practice became less common as years went on.

The 503d Army Air Forces Base Unit was responsible for the operation of Presidential Aircraft until 27 September 1947 when the United States Air Force was created. At that time, the unit was redesignated as the 503d Air Force Base unit. The unit was nicknamed as the "Brass Hat Squadron". The 16th (later 1100th) Special Air Missions Group was created in 1948 and assigned to the newly created Military Air Transport Service. The mission of the group was to transport civilian government employees for Air Force and non-Air Force activities as directed by Air Force headquarters. The group consisted of eight squadrons, each strategically located adjacent to the headquarters of the agencies utilizing transportation furnished by the squadrons. This included the transportation of the president of the United States, the vice president, members of the cabinet, members of Congress, and other high-ranking American and foreign dignitaries.

In 1947, USAAF officials ordered the 29th production DC-6 to be modified as a replacement for the aging VC-54C Sacred Cow presidential aircraft. On 4 July 1947, a VC-118, a military version of the Douglas DC-6 commercial airliner, came into use. It differed from the standard DC-6 configuration in that the aft fuselage was converted into a stateroom; the main cabin seated 24 passengers or could be made up into 12 "sleeper" berths. The VC-118 was nicknamed "Independence" for the President Harry Truman's hometown in Missouri. In September 1947, this USAAF aircraft became a USAF aircraft with the establishment of the U.S. Air Force as an independent service. Probably the plane's most historic flight occurred when it carried President Truman to Wake Island in October 1950 to discuss the Korean situation with General of the Army Douglas MacArthur.

In May 1953, after nearly six years of White House service, the Independence was retired as a presidential aircraft and subsequently served several Air Force organizations as a VIP transport.

President Dwight D. Eisenhower traveled aboard the "Columbine II" and "Columbine III" from 1953 to 1961. This was a modified C-121 Constellation commercial transport, designated as a VC-121E, and was President Eisenhower's personal airplane between 1954 and 1961. Mrs. Eisenhower christened it Columbine III in honor of the official flower of Colorado, her adopted home state, in ceremonies on 24 November 1954. Columbine III served as the presidential aircraft until President Eisenhower left office in January 1961. It remained in service transporting government officials and visiting foreign dignitaries throughout the world until 1966.

A 1953 incident where Eisenhower's aircraft was "Air Force 8610" and an Eastern Airlines plane was "Eastern 8610" created the need to devise a unique call sign. The call sign "Air Force One" was classified during the 1950s to identify not only the president's plane, but when he was aboard. In September 1961, it became popularly known when it identified President John F. Kennedy flying aboard his C-118.

In 1961, the 1254th Air Transport Wing was moved from Washington National Airport to Andrews Air Force Base, Maryland, where it was later disestablished in January 1966. In its place, the 89th MAW Special Missions was activated and assigned to Andrews Air Force Base until the wing became a group on 30 September 1977.

In 1962, a VC-137C specifically purchased for use as Air Force One, entered into service with the tail number 26000. It is perhaps the most widely known and most historically significant presidential aircraft. SAM 26000 flew President John F. Kennedy to West Berlin in 1963, where he declared to West Berliners, "Ich bin ein Berliner," assuring them of continuing United States support in the face of Communist threats and the construction of the Berlin Wall. Kennedy also flew aboard SAM 26000 to Dallas, Texas, where he was assassinated on 22 November 1963—and it was on this airplane that vice president Lyndon B. Johnson was sworn in as the new president. SAM 26000 then carried John F. Kennedy's body and President Johnson back to Washington, D.C. Johnson also used 26000 to visit U.S. troops in Vietnam during the Vietnam War.

Beginning in 1970 Henry Kissinger used the aircraft for 13 trips to Paris, France, for secret meetings with the North Vietnamese. In February 1972 President Nixon flew aboard SAM 26000 on his historic "Journey for Peace" to the People's Republic of China (the first visit by an American president to China). In May 1972 SAM 26000 carried Nixon to the Soviet Union.

SAM 26000 was augmented in December 1972 by another VC-137, Special Air Mission 27000, with SAM 26000 retained as an alternate Air Force One aircraft until it was finally retired in 1998. Richard Nixon was the first president to use SAM 27000, and the newer VC-137 served every president until it was replaced by the two VC-25 aircraft (SAM 28000 and 29000) in 1990. However, SAM 27000 continued to remain in service as an Air Force Two and alternate Air Force One aircraft until retired in 2001.

In October 1981 the aircraft flew presidents Nixon, Ford and Carter, and former Secretary of State Kissinger to the funeral of the slain Egyptian President Anwar Sadat. In March 1983, Queen Elizabeth II of the United Kingdom flew on SAM 26000 during her trip to the United States when she visited the West Coast.

At a nationally televised event in May 1998, the USAF retired SAM 26000. This aircraft provided thirty-six years of service and accumulated more than 13,000 flying hours. SAM 27000 was similarly retired in August 2001.

The current Special Air Mission for presidential travel used a modified Boeing 747-200B (VC-25A). The two aircraft currently in U.S. service are highly modified, to include EMP hardening of all communications and avionics systems and an aerial refueling capability allowing the ability to refuel from USAF KC-135 Stratotanker, KC-10 Extender, and the beleaguered future KC-46 Pegasus aircraft. The VC-25s carry tail numbers 28000 and 29000. Although the Air Force One designation technically applies to the planes only while the President is aboard, the term is commonly applied to the VC-25s more generally. They often operate in conjunction with Marine One, a Marine Corps helicopter, typically a VH-3D Sea King, operated by Marine Helicopter Squadron ONE (HMX-1), which ferries the president to airports or other locations in circumstances where a vehicle motorcade would be inappropriate.

In the future, the VC-25A's will be replaced by the Boeing 747-8 derived VC-25B, and the VH-3D Sea King and VH-60N “White Hawk” helicopters will be replaced by a fleet of 23 Sikorsky S-92 based VH-92A helicopters.
