= List of official vehicles of the president of the United States =

This is a list of official vehicles of the president of the United States, past and present.

== State vehicles ==
- 1939 Lincoln K series Sunshine Special, used by Franklin D. Roosevelt. On display at the Henry Ford Museum
- 1942 Lincoln Custom, used by Franklin D. Roosevelt and Harry S. Truman
- 1950 Lincoln Cosmopolitan, used by Harry S. Truman, Dwight D. Eisenhower, and John F. Kennedy. On display at the Henry Ford Museum, this vehicle was the first to use a bulletproof "bubbletop" canopy, which was added in 1954. The car remained in service until 1967.
- 1961 Lincoln Continental SS-100-X, used by John F. Kennedy and Lyndon B. Johnson. On display at the Henry Ford Museum
- 1965 Lincoln Continental, used by Lyndon B. Johnson
- 1969 Lincoln Continental, used by Richard Nixon. On display at the Richard Nixon Presidential Library and Museum
- 1972 Lincoln Continental, used by Gerald Ford, Jimmy Carter, and Ronald Reagan. It was ordered as a 1970 model (with a 1970 serial number) but with the 1972 body style, and updated later to match 1977–1979 models. The vehicle was involved in the 1975 assassination attempt of Ford, as well as the 1981 assassination attempt of Reagan, and is on display at the Henry Ford Museum.
- 1983 Cadillac Fleetwood Brougham, used by Ronald Reagan
- 1989 Lincoln Town Car, used by George H. W. Bush
- 1993 Cadillac Fleetwood, used by Bill Clinton. This was the first Cadillac that was designed from the ground up for use as a state car. Previous models were modified production units. It is on display at the Clinton Presidential Center.
- 2001 Cadillac de Ville used by George W. Bush
- 2005 Cadillac DTS Presidential State Car, used by George W. Bush and Barack Obama.
- 2009 Cadillac "Cadillac One", used by Barack Obama and Donald Trump
- 2011 Ground Force One, a Prevost Car chassis-based bus used by Barack Obama
- 2018 Cadillac used by Donald Trump and Joe Biden. Road & Track reported that "the design appears to be a simple evolution of the old model with more current Cadillac design cues, like an Escalade sedan. It weighs between 15,000 and 20,000 pounds (6,800 and 9,100 kg).
- 2026 armored Cadillac Escalade first used by Donald Trump in Davos. It is unclear if it is intended to replace or be used along side the "Beast" sedans.

== Yachts ==
- USS Despatch (1880–1890), the first presidential yacht, used by presidents Rutherford B. Hayes, James Garfield, Chester A. Arthur, Grover Cleveland and Benjamin Harrison; lost off Virginia in 1891
- USS Dolphin (1897–1920), used by William McKinley and later Theodore Roosevelt
- USS Sylph (1898–1921), used by William McKinley, Theodore Roosevelt, William Howard Taft, and Woodrow Wilson
- USS Mayflower (1905–1929), used by every president from Theodore Roosevelt to Calvin Coolidge
- USS Sequoia (1931–1977), used by every president from Herbert Hoover to Jimmy Carter, who ordered the aging yacht sold in 1977
- USS Potomac (1936–1945), used by Franklin D. Roosevelt
- USS Williamsburg (1945–1953), used by Harry S. Truman. Dwight D. Eisenhower retired it as a "symbol of needless luxury".
- A yacht variously named:
  - Lenore II. Harry S. Truman used it as a tender for the Williamsburg.
  - Barbara Anne, by Dwight D. Eisenhower
  - Honey Fitz, by John F. Kennedy. The name was retained by Lyndon B. Johnson.
  - Patricia, by Richard Nixon. It was sold in 1970 to a private individual.
- U.S. Coast Guard cutter/yacht Manitou, chosen by John F. Kennedy in 1962; sold in 1968 to the Harry Lundeburg School of Seamanship

== Aircraft ==
Although "Air Force One" is commonly used to refer to the president's primary aircraft, the designation is, strictly speaking, a call sign used to identify any U.S. Air Force aircraft the president is aboard, rather than the name of a particular aircraft.

Franklin D. Roosevelt was the first president to fly in an aircraft while in office. In January 1943 he flew in a Pan American Airways Boeing 314 flying boat, named Dixie Clipper, to Casablanca to meet with British prime minister Winston Churchill. It was soon realized that the president would need a dedicated aircraft; a C-54 transport was converted to serve as the presidential aircraft and named Sacred Cow. Roosevelt made only one trip in the Sacred Cow. That was to the Yalta Conference in February 1945 to meet with Churchill and Soviet leader Joseph Stalin to make plans for the reconstruction of Europe after the impending Allied victory.

=== Primary presidential aircraft ===
(Numbers in parentheses are the official U.S. Air Force tail numbers for each aircraft.)

- Sacred Cow, VC-54C (42-107451) used by Franklin D. Roosevelt and Harry S. Truman from February 1945 to July 1947.
- Independence, VC-118 (46-0505) used by Harry S. Truman and Dwight D. Eisenhower from July 1947 to May 1953. Used as a VIP transport from 1953 until retired in 1965.
- Columbine II, VC-121A (48-0610) used by Dwight D. Eisenhower from May 1953 to November 1954. First presidential aircraft to use the call sign "Air Force One". Retired in 1968.
- Columbine III, VC-121E (53-7885) used by Dwight D. Eisenhower from November 1954 to January 1961. Retired in April 1966.
- SAM 970, VC-137A/B (58-6970) used by Dwight D. Eisenhower and John F. Kennedy from August 1959 to 1962. One of three VC-137A/B VIP aircraft in service from 1959 until June 1996 to transport senior government officials. The two others had tail numbers 58-6971 and 58-6972.
- SAM 26000, VC-137C (62-6000) used by John F. Kennedy, Lyndon B. Johnson, and Richard Nixon from 1962 to 1972. Retired in 1998.
- SAM 27000 (Spirit of '76), VC-137C (72-7000) used by Richard Nixon, Gerald Ford, Jimmy Carter, Ronald Reagan, and George H. W. Bush from 1972 to 1990. Retired in 2001.
- SAM 28000, VC-25A (82-8000) used by George H. W. Bush, Bill Clinton, George W. Bush, Barack Obama, Donald Trump, and Joe Biden from 1990 to the present. Its sister aircraft, SAM 29000 (82-9000), serves as the primary backup presidential aircraft.

(The dates shown above are the dates when the aircraft was used as the primary presidential aircraft. Most were retained in service for several years after the dates shown.)

=== Other presidential aircraft ===
In addition to the above, a number of other aircraft have been used by presidents for trips of short duration. Below is a listing of aircraft types assigned to the 89th Airlift Wing for use by, or in support of, the president or other senior government officials.

Currently in service

- C-20C – A military variant of the Gulfstream III, upgraded and with secure communications, often utilized as backup aircraft accompanying the VC-25A aircraft when it is operating as Air Force One
- C-32 – Four C-32As, a military variant of the Boeing 757-200, were acquired in 2002 (98-0001, 98-0002, 99-0003, and 99-0004), three more in 2010 (09-0015, 09-0016, 09-0017) and an additional one in 2019 (19-0018).
- C-40B – Two C-40Bs (01-0040 and 01-0041), a military variant of the Boeing 737-700C have been in service since 2002.
- C-37A – Three C-37As (one delivered in 2005 and two in 2006 with tail numbers 99-0404, 01-0027, and 01-0028), a military variant of the Gulfstream V, are currently in service.
- C-37B – Three C-37Bs (18-1942, 18-1947, and 20-1941) are currently in service.

Formerly in service

- VC-118A (53-3240) – A military variant of the Douglas DC-6, in service from 1947 to 1965. Used to access airfields with shorter runways
- U-4B – Two Aero Commander U-4Bs (55-4647 and 55-4648) were in presidential service from 1956 to 1960. Retired in 1977
- VC-137A/B – Three VC-137A/Bs (58-6970, 58-6971 and 58-6972), a military variant of the Boeing 707, were in service from 1959 to 1996. These were the first jet aircraft used to transport the president and also provided transportation to very senior government officials (i.e. first ladies, vice presidents, and secretaries of state) during their service.
- VC-137C – Four VC-137Cs, a military variant of the Boeing 707, were acquired in 1962 (62-6000), 1972 (72-7000), 1985 (85-6973), and 1987 (85-6974) respectively and served to the early 2000s. The two acquired in 1962 (62-6000) and 1972 (72-7000) served respectively as the primary presidential aircraft until the acquisition of two VC-25As in 1990.
- VC-140B – Six VC-140Bs (61-2488, 61-2489, 61-2490, 61-2491, 61-2492 and 61-2493), a military variant of the Lockheed JetStar, were in service from 1961 to 1987.
- VC-6A – One VC-6A (66-7943), a Beechcraft King Air B90, was used to transport President Lyndon B. Johnson between Bergstrom Air Force Base and his family ranch near Johnson City, Texas from 1964 to 1969.
- Boeing VC-135B – Five VC-135 aircraft (62-4125, 62-4126, 62-4127, 62-4129, and 62-4130), converted from KC-135 tankers, were in service with the 89th MAW from 1968 to 1992. All were converted to other configurations.
- VC-9C – Three VC-9Cs (73-1681, 73-1682, and 73-1683), a military variant of the McDonnell Douglas C-9, were in service from the 1976 to 2011.

The president and other senior executives have also frequently made use of the Boeing C-17 Globemaster III cargo plane outfitted with "comfort pallets" to provide basic amenities while travelling into war zones undercover with normal non-prioritized call signs so not to draw attention to the fact that a high value target is in the area. C-17's also typically proceed presidential travel by bringing the presidential limousine, Marine One, and other Secret Service vehicles and equipment to an area for a visit.

=== Call signs ===
The following air traffic control call signs designate aircraft transporting the president:

- Air Force One, any U.S. Air Force aircraft with the president on board
- Marine One, the presidential helicopter
- Army One, usually a helicopter. The U.S. Army shared the duty of transporting the president by helicopter with the U.S. Marine Corps until 1976, when the latter took on sole responsibility.
- Navy One, this designation has been used only once, when in 2003 an S-3 Viking airplane flew then President George W. Bush to the aircraft carrier USS Abraham Lincoln.
- Coast Guard One; this call sign has not yet been used, although then-Vice President Joe Biden did fly on Coast Guard Two in 2009.
- Space Force One; this call sign has not yet been used.
- Executive One, any civilian aircraft carrying the president. This designation has been used only once, when in 1973 Richard Nixon flew with a United Airlines DC-10 from Dulles International Airport to Los Angeles International Airport.

== Rail cars ==
- United States (1865), constructed in 1863 and 1864. Abraham Lincoln never used the "elaborately appointed" car. After his assassination, his body was transported to Springfield, Illinois in it.
- Ferdinand Magellan (1943–1958, 1984), used by Franklin D. Roosevelt, Harry S. Truman, and Dwight D. Eisenhower. Ronald Reagan used it for his whistlestop tour across Ohio in 1984.

== See also ==
- Transportation of the president of the United States
