= Air Force Two =

ATC call sign of any US Air Force aircraft carrying the vice president of the US

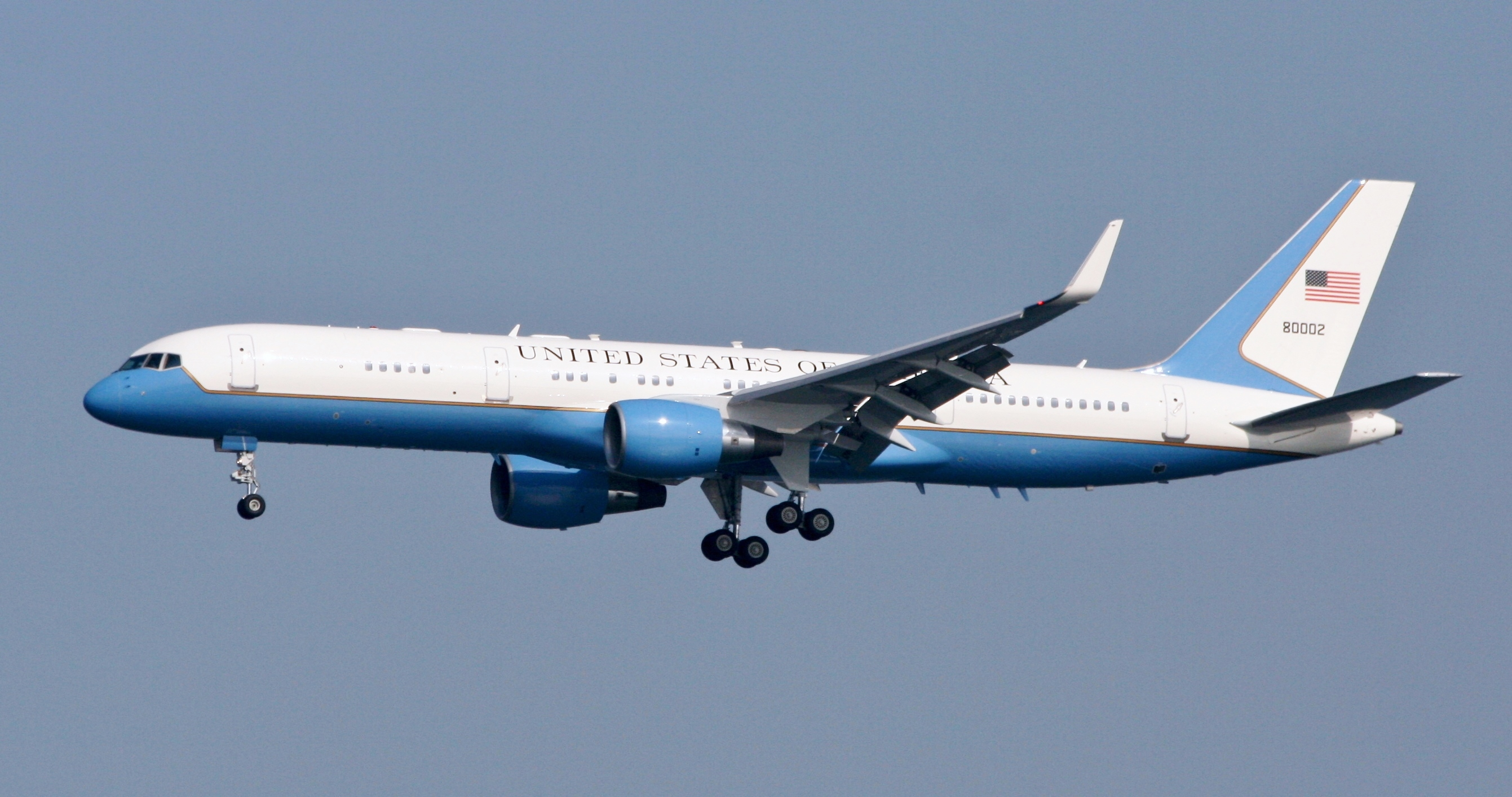
The Boeing C-32, a variant of the 757, is the usual transportation for the vice president of the United States

Air Force Two is the air traffic control designated call sign held by any United States Air Force aircraft carrying the vice president of the United States, but not the president. The term is often associated with the Boeing C-32, a modified 757 which is most commonly used as the vice president's transport. Other 89th Airlift Wing aircraft, such as the Boeing C-40 Clipper, C-20B, C-37A, and C-37B, have also served in this role. The VC-25A, the aircraft most often used by the president as Air Force One, has also been used by the vice president as Air Force Two.

== History ==
Richard Nixon was one of the first senior officials in American government to travel internationally via jet aircraft on official business, taking a Boeing VC-137A Stratoliner on his visit to the Soviet Union in July 1959 for the Kitchen Debates as Eisenhower's vice president.

Domestically, non-presidential VIP travel still relied on the prop powered Convair VC-131 Samaritan aircraft until Nelson Rockefeller was named Gerald Ford's vice president in 1974. Rockefeller personally owned a Grumman Gulfstream II jet that he preferred to the much slower Convair; Rockefeller's Gulfstream II then used the "Executive Two" callsign while he was in office. This would prompt the 89th Airlift Wing's acquisition of three McDonnell Douglas VC-9Cs in 1975, adding to their three VC-137s jets used for senior executive international travel.

Prior senior executive aircraft included the former presidential Douglas VC-54 Skymaster, Douglas VC-118A, and Lockheed C-121 Constellations, held in reserve as back-up aircraft for the newer aircraft designated for presidential travel.

== Design ==
Aircraft allocated for use by the vice president and senior executives authorized to travel under the Special Air Mission designation operated by the 89th Airlift Wing can be distinguished from the distinctive Raymond Loewy Air Force One livery by the lack of the steel blue cheatline and cap over the cockpit.

Former presidential aircraft that has been redesignated for non-presidential VIP travel will be repainted in the secondary livery as illustrated in the difference between VC-137C SAM 26000 and VC-137C SAM 27000's current paint schemes. Both SAM 26000 and SAM 27000 were relegated to a non-presidential VIP role upon delivery of their replacements, but SAM 27000 was repainted by the Reagan Library to match its Reagan era paint scheme (see chronology of SAM 27000 images under Reagan, George W. Bush, and as currently maintained by the library).

== Incidents ==
In 2012, Joe Biden switched to another plane after the plane in which he was flying in California struck birds. A similar incident in 2020 involving a bird strike in the engine during takeoff caused Air Force Two to land back at a nearby New Hampshire airport while it was carrying Mike Pence and some of his staff. In June 2021, Air Force Two, with Kamala Harris aboard, was forced to return to Joint Base Andrews in Maryland after suffering a "technical issue." Harris—who was on her way to Guatemala—resumed her flight on a different aircraft approximately an hour and a half later.

== See also ==
- Marine Two
- Coast Guard Two
- 1254th Air Transport Wing
- 89th Airlift Wing
