= Transportation of the president of the United States =

State vehicle fleet of the U.S. chief executive

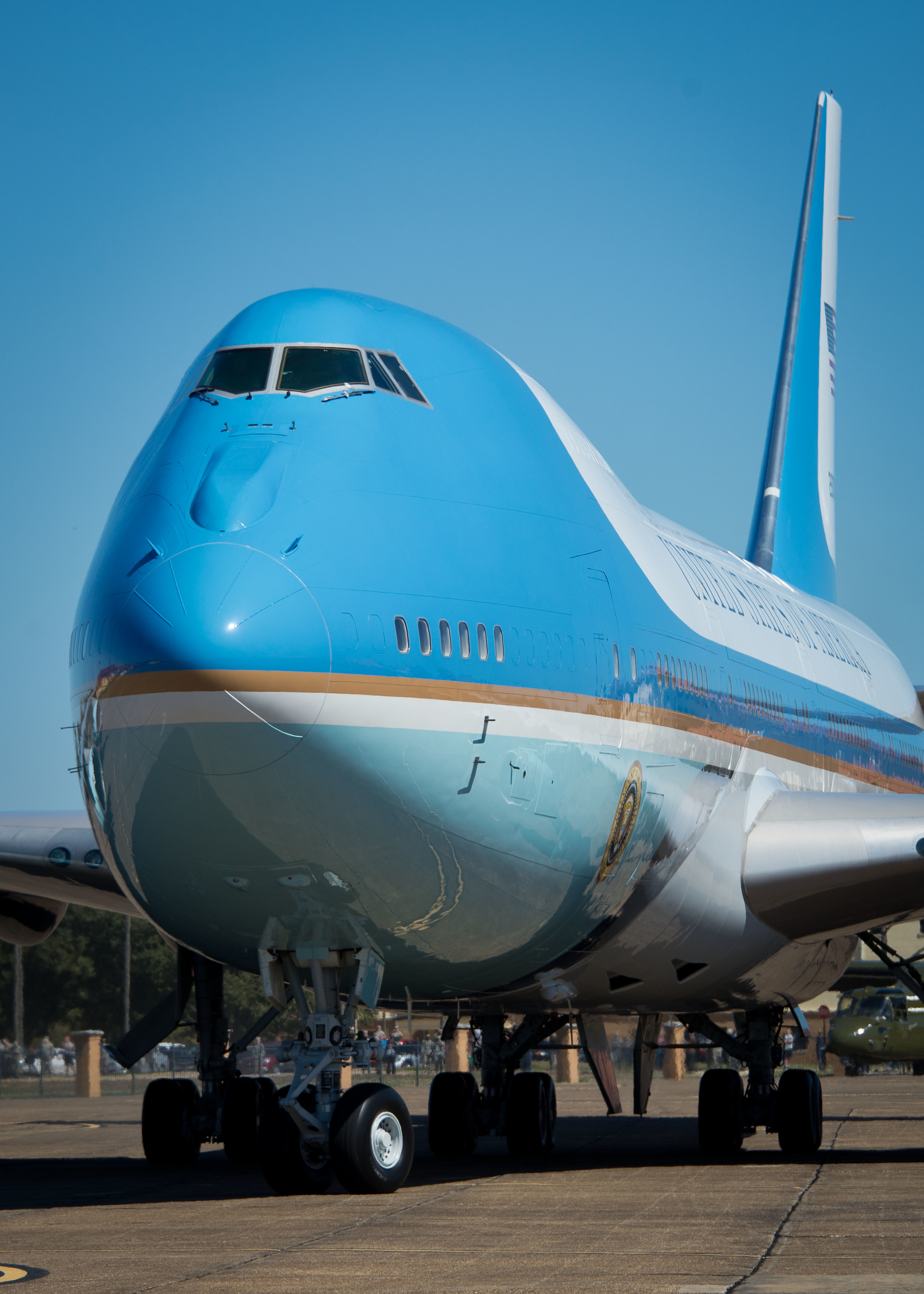
VC-25A

The United States government has maintained a variety of vehicles for the president. Because of the president's role as commander-in-chief, military transports are exclusively used for international travel; however, the civilian Secret Service operates the president's motorcade.

One of the most famous transports is "Air Force One", which is not technically a specific aircraft, but rather the callsign of certain aircraft when the president is on board. This practice was started when there was confusion between the presidential aircraft and a civilian aircraft in 1953. However, it usually means the VC-25, a Boeing 747 which has been converted for presidential use. Presidents have traveled in everything from horses, trains, cars, helicopters, boats, and fixed-wing aircraft.

== Aircraft ==
In modern times, the main aircraft flown by the U.S. president are specialized jet airliners and helicopters. The first presidential flight was taken during WW2, since then, there has been a series of presidential aircraft leading up to the current 747. There is also a variety of VIP helicopters that fly the president, often taking off from the White House lawn.

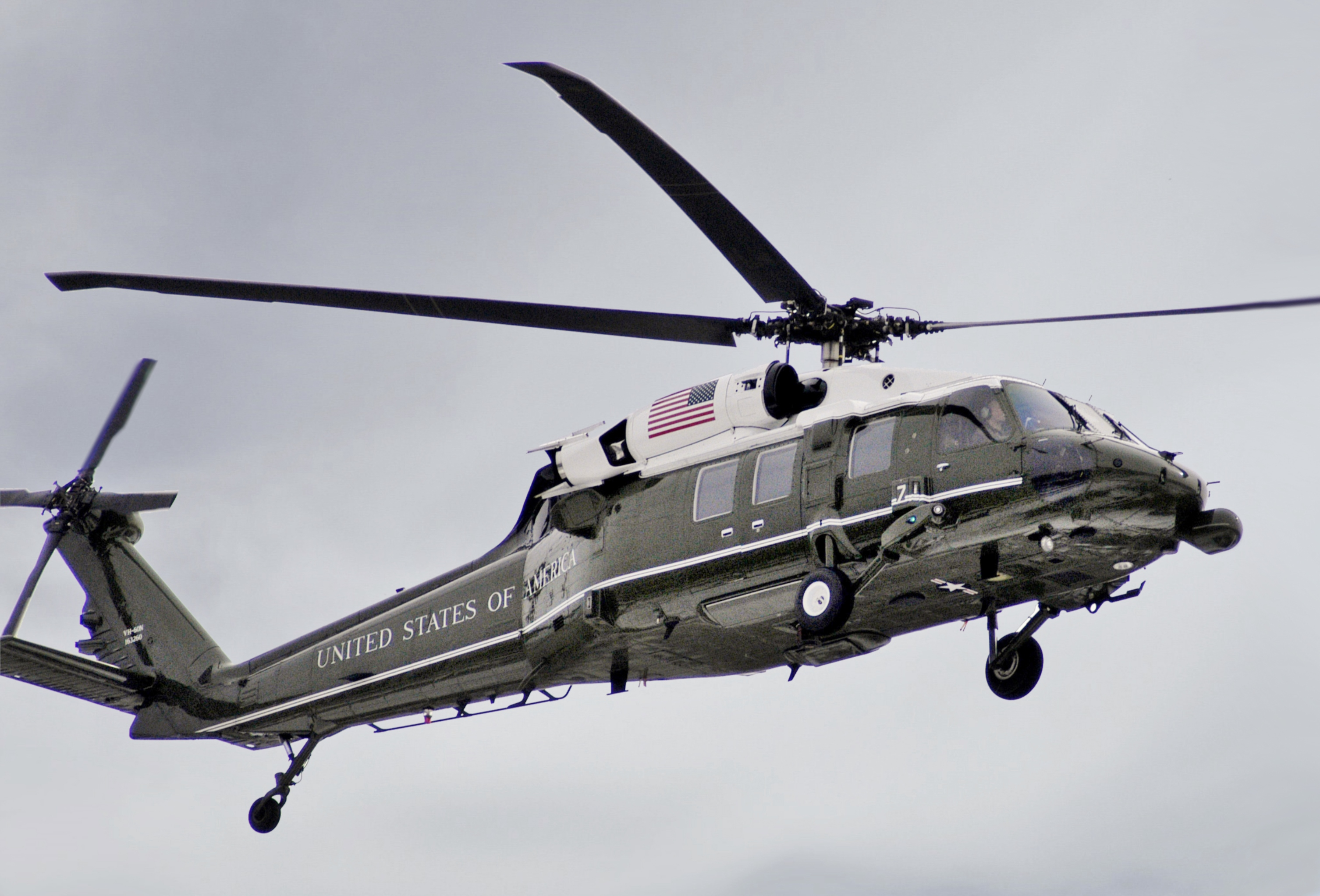
VH-60N helicopter used to transport the president of the United States

One Douglas Dolphin (Naval designation RD-2) was procured by the U.S. Navy as a transport for President Franklin D. Roosevelt. Although never used by Roosevelt, this was the first aircraft procured for transport of the president of the United States, it was available from 1933 to 1939.

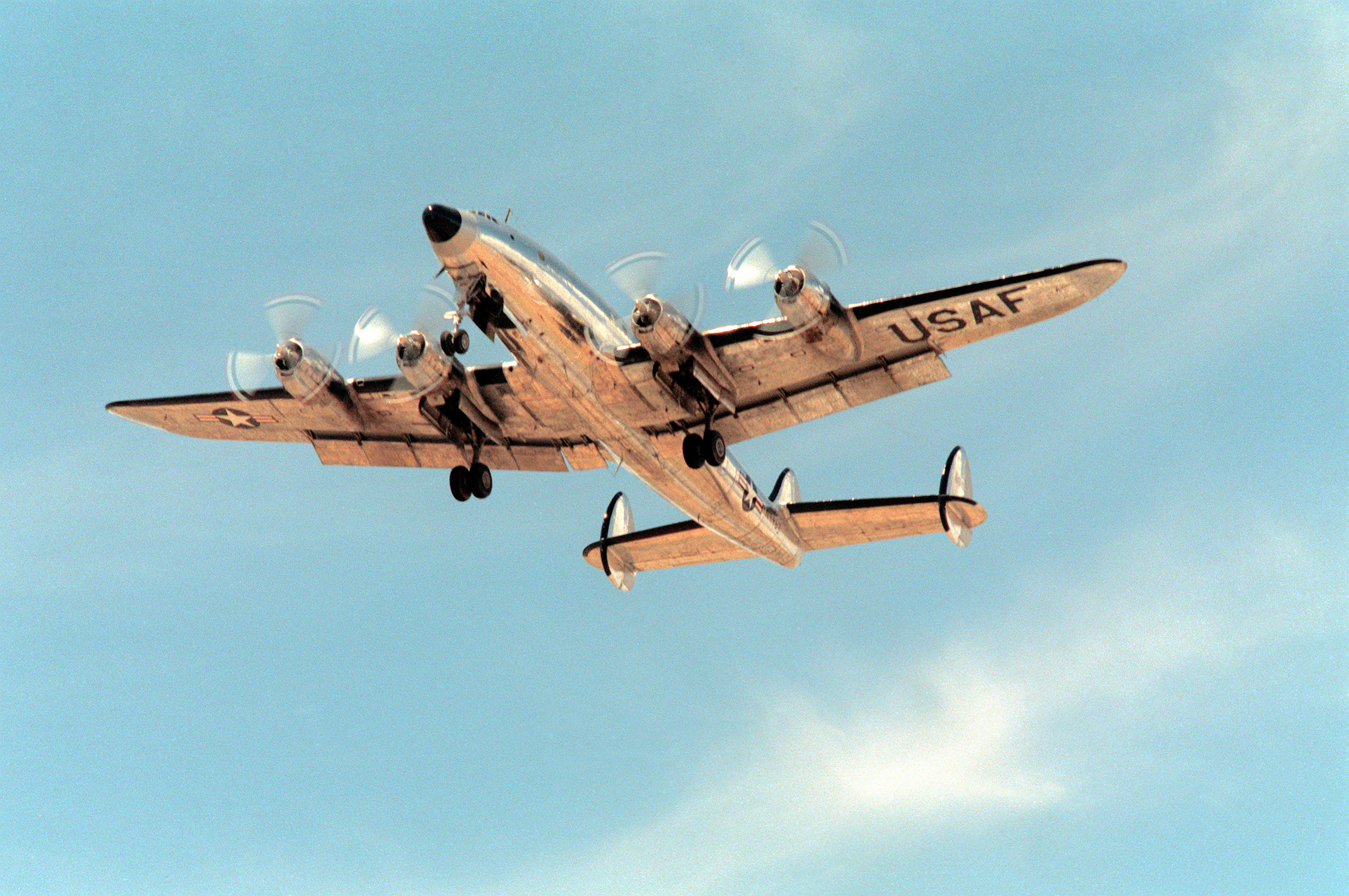
Columbine II in 1990. This was the first aircraft to go by Air Force One.

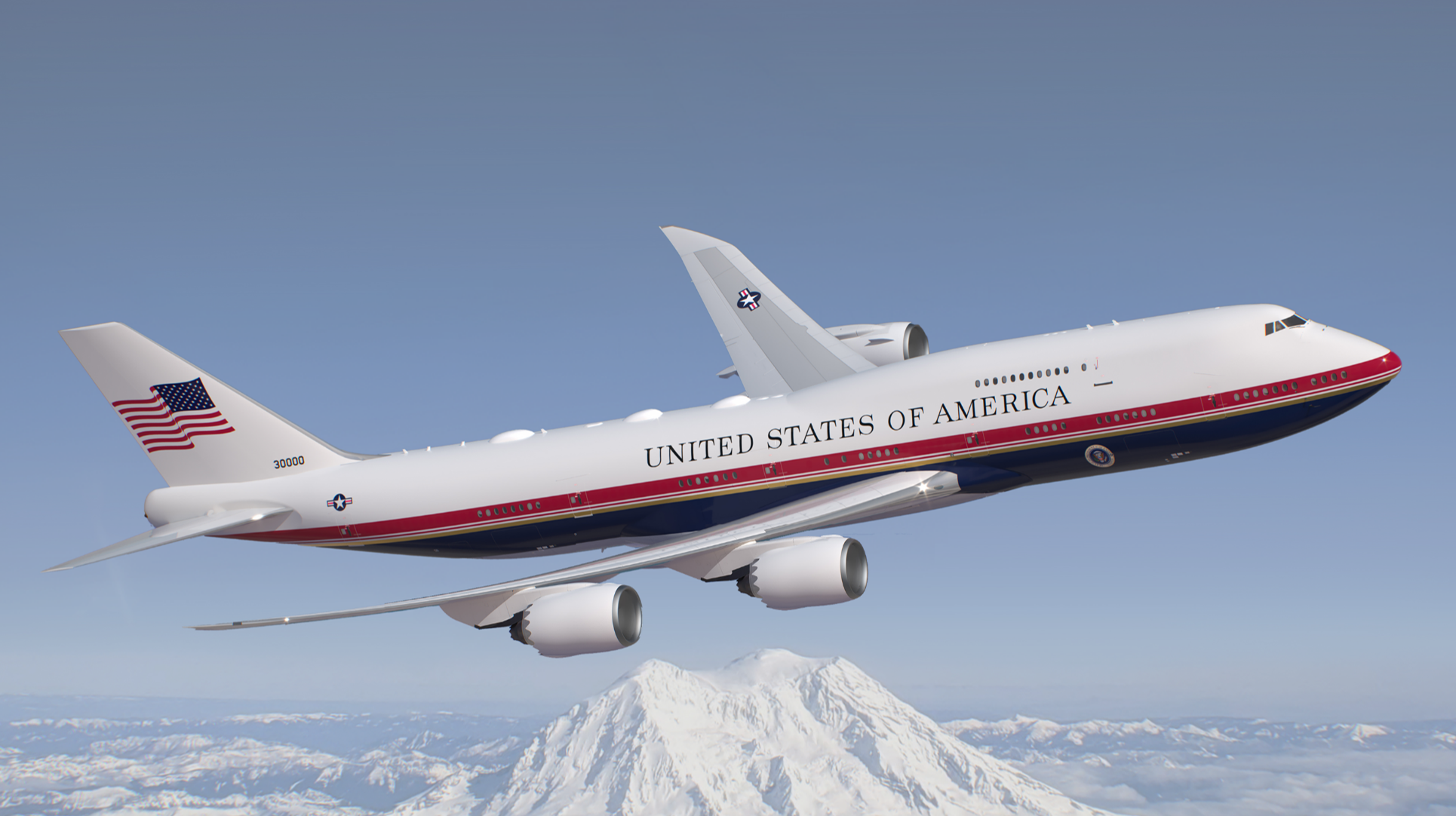
Concept for the new Air Force One (VC-25B)

The first sitting president to fly in an aircraft was Franklin D. Roosevelt; in January 1943 he flew on the Dixie Clipper flying boat to the Casablanca conference. On the first flight they flew to Trinidad; Belem, Brazil; and Bathurst, Gambia, but for the last leg of the flight switched a Douglas C-54 Skymaster arriving at Casablanca's Medouina Airport. Roosevelt departed Morocco on the USS Memphis cruiser, then took the Clipper back to the United States. On the way the president celebrated his 61st birthday aboard the aircraft setting another first.

The success of this voyage lead to a specialized aircraft, the VC-54C Sacred Cow, for presidential aircraft transport during WW2 (including the Yalta Conference in 1945) and also used by President Harry S. Truman during and after the war. The VC-54C Sacred Cow left presidential service but was used until 1961, and retired to a museum. The VC-54C Sacred Cow was replaced by the VC-118 Independence, a version of the DC-6 Airliner for presidential service between 1947 and 1953.

The next presidential aircraft, was under President Dwight D. Eisenhower (1953–1961) which include two customized Lockheed C-121 Constellations: aircraft Columbine II (VC-121A 48-610) and Columbine III (VC-121E 53–7885). In addition two smaller Aero Commanders were also added to the fleet.

Columbine II is the first plane to bear the call sign Air Force One, which was a designation created for carrying a sitting president. It was established after a 1954 incident in which a commercial flight, Eastern Air Lines 8610, crossed paths with Air Force 8610, which was carrying President Eisenhower. Initially used informally, the designation became official in 1962, and this was the start of calling the presidential aircraft Air Force One.

Since 1953 whenever the president is on board a military flight its call sign is the name of the armed service followed by the word "One". Thus Air Force One, Army One (no longer used), Coast Guard One (never used), Marine One, Navy One (used once). However, only the Air Force and Marine Corps actively maintain aircraft for the commander-in-chief, and as of November 20, 2024, the president has never flown in either a Coast Guard or Space Force aircraft or spacecraft. If the president uses a civilian airplane, it is designated Executive One.

== Automobiles ==
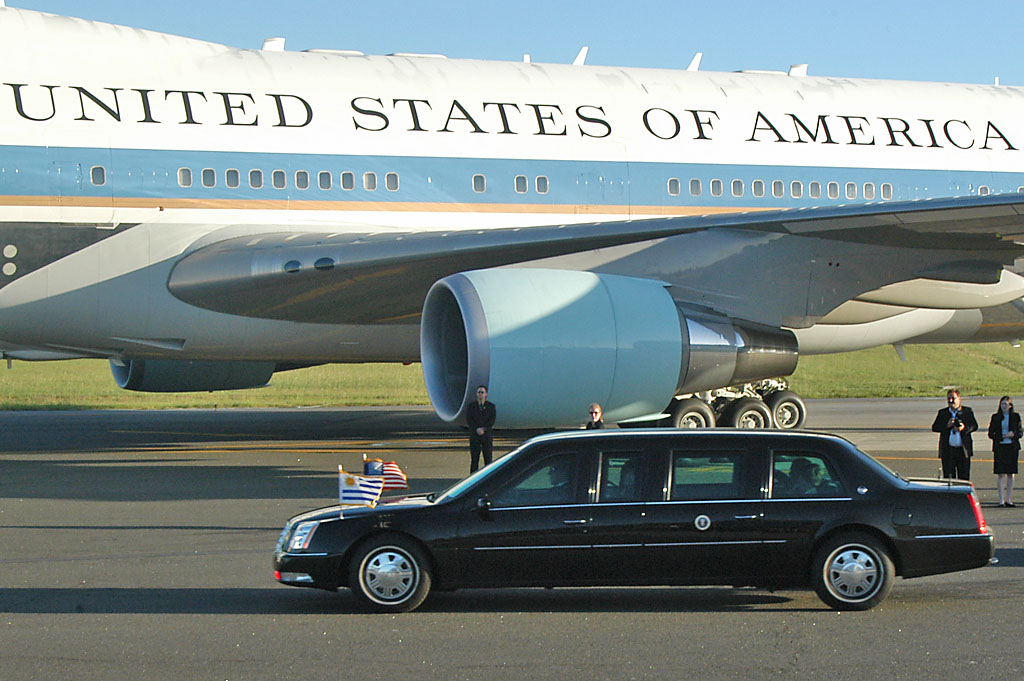
The presidential state car and Air Force One during a state visit in 2007

The presidential state car is a limousine called Cadillac One or The Beast which is operated by the Secret Service. There are at least ten limousines. There is also a bus unofficially called Ground Force One officially called Stagecoach, while the president is aboard, which is operated by the Secret Service.

The first serving president to ride in a car was President William McKinley, who briefly rode in a Stanley Motor Carriage Company steam car on July 13, 1901.

In 1936, President Franklin D. Roosevelt bought a Ford V8 Phaeton coupe and had it equipped with hand controls.

== Carriages ==
Four presidential carriages were built by the H & C Studebaker blacksmith shop, the predecessor of the Studebaker Corporation; one of these carried Lincoln to the Ford's Theatre the night of his assassination. All four carriages are on permanent display at the Studebaker National Museum located in South Bend, Indiana. The carriages were used by presidents Ulysses S. Grant, Benjamin Harrison, Abraham Lincoln and William McKinley.

== Railcars ==
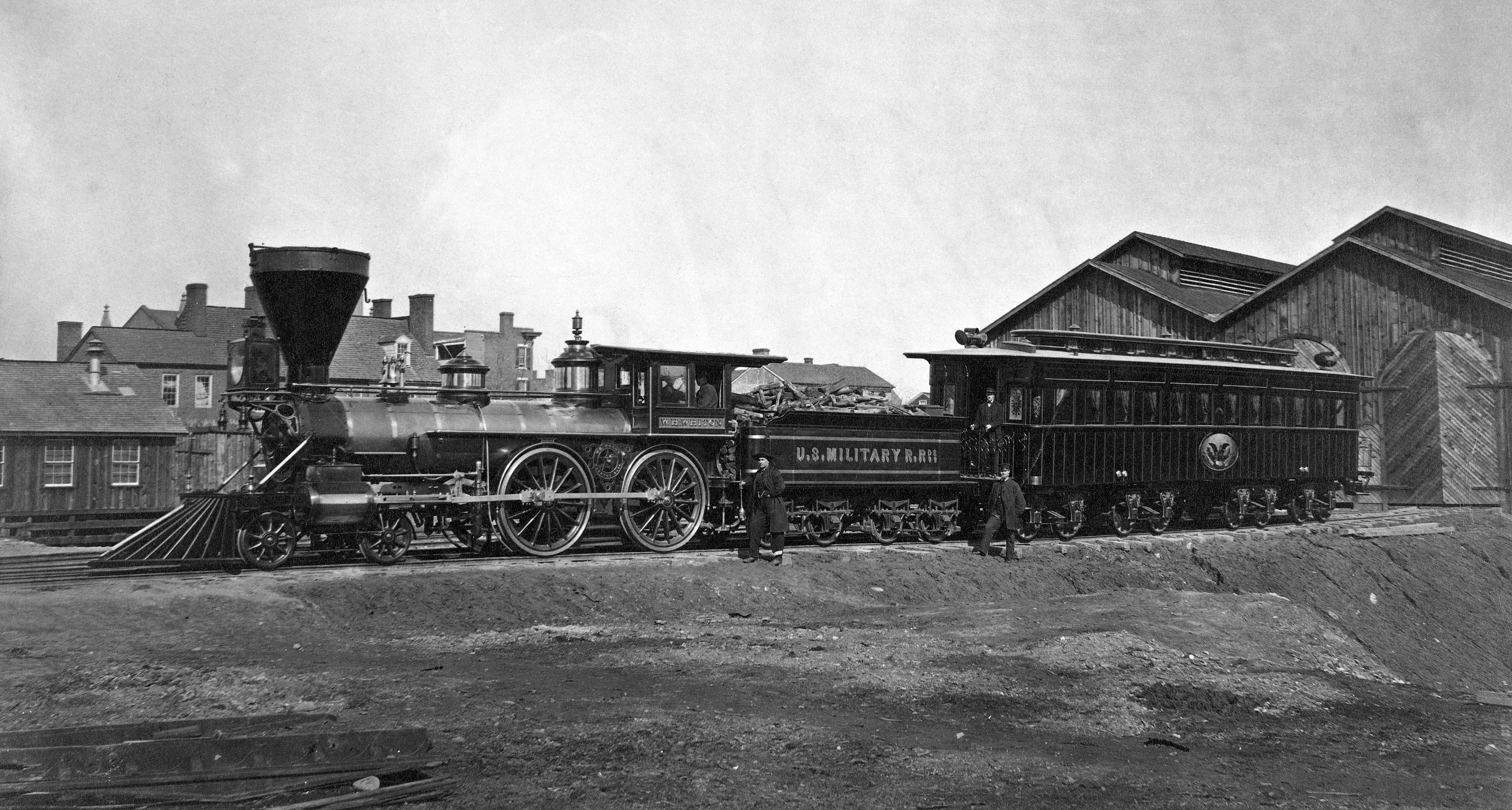
Lincoln's executive coach

A number of presidents have traveled by rail. A private railroad car was the equivalent of a private jet today, with the first executive coach built exclusively for the president, a deep maroon painted car named the United States', completed during Lincoln's term. Wary of the optics such opulence signaled in the aftermath of the Civil War, Lincoln never got the opportunity to enjoy the deluxe accommodations while alive, however it would take Lincoln on his final journey, a slow circuitous trip from Washington, D.C., to Springfield, Illinois, with the remains of his son Willie in a funeral train, retracing the route of his inaugural journey in 1861.

Weeks after the election of Franklin Pierce (shortly before his inauguration), on January 6, 1853, Pierce and his family were traveling from Boston by train and had a rail accident. Their car derailed and rolled down an embankment near Andover, Massachusetts. Both Franklin and Jane Pierce survived, but their only remaining son, 11-year-old Benjamin, was crushed to death in the wreckage.

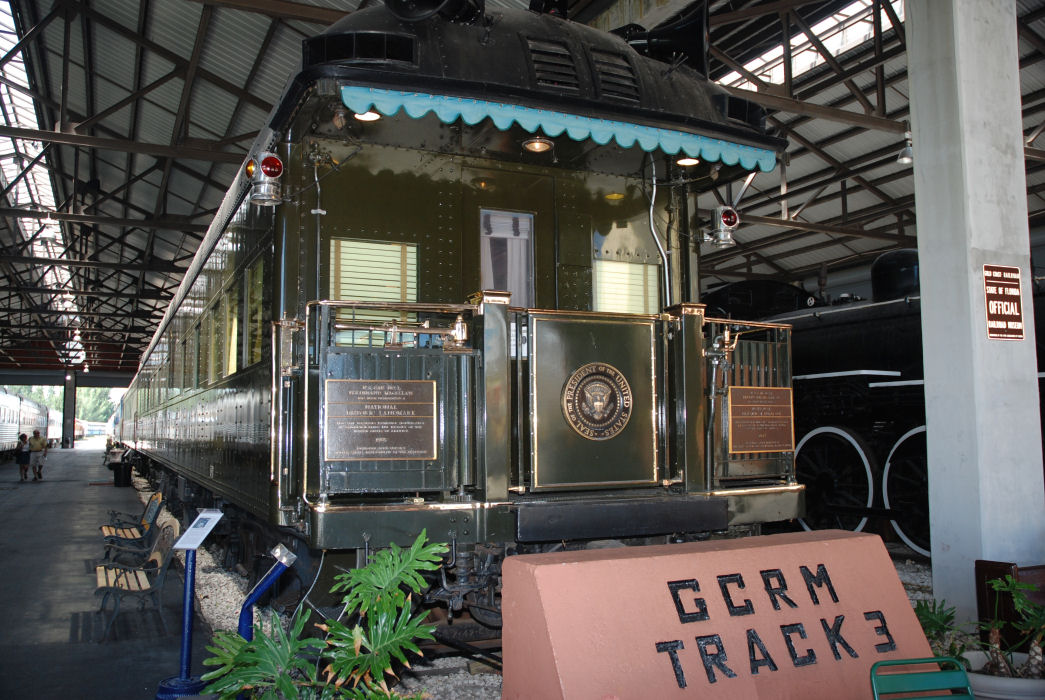
Ferdinand Magellan at the Gold Coast Railroad Museum in 2007

Late 19th and early 20th century presidents would use trains to campaign and travel across the country much as presidents use Air Force One today, conducting whistle stop tours to personally reach voters across the country.

President Franklin D. Roosevelt made extensive use of the railroad in his campaign in 1933, and traveled across the country during World War 2 aboard U.S. Car No. 1, a train composed of the Ferdinand Magellan executive car, a converted hospital car with high-tech radio gear installed for communications, a baggage car to carry the Sunshine Special and other support vehicles, and other cars to accommodate press and Secret Service personnel.

The Ferdinand Magellan was a Pullman Company business car pulled from charter service, armor plated, and rebuilt into living quarters and office for FDR in 1941. It is currently on static display at the Gold Coast Railroad Museum in Miami-Dade County, Florida. The Ferdinand Magellan was last used by President Ronald Reagan, who used the coach during his re-election campaign in 1984.

The Georgia 300 is a privately owned rail car that has been used by several presidents during whistle stop campaign tours. Georgia 300 has hosted presidents George H. W. Bush, Bill Clinton, and Barack Obama.

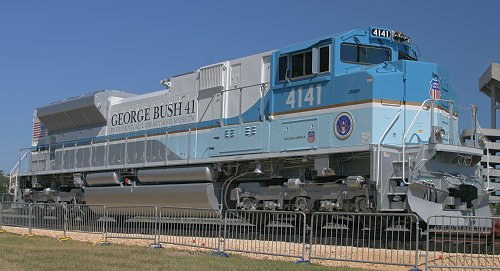
4141 on display at the George Bush Presidential Library

George H. W. Bush was the first president to travel by train as part of his funeral arrangements in almost 50 years, traveling aboard Union Pacific 4141, an EMD SD70ACe which had been painted in Air Force One livery and named in his honor in 2005. The last president to have a funeral train was Dwight D. Eisenhower, who made his final journey from Washington D.C. to his hometown in Abilene, Kansas, where he was laid to rest in 1969.

Former president Joe Biden frequently made use of commercial Amtrak service to commute between Washington D.C. and his home in Delaware during his time as senator, and briefly campaigned via train in Ohio and Pennsylvania. Despite this, he did not continue the tradition of presidential railcars during his presidency. During his surprise visit to Ukraine on 21 February 2023, he traveled in a revamped private carriage of the Ukrainian Railways Service dubbed 'Rail Force One'.

== Yachts ==
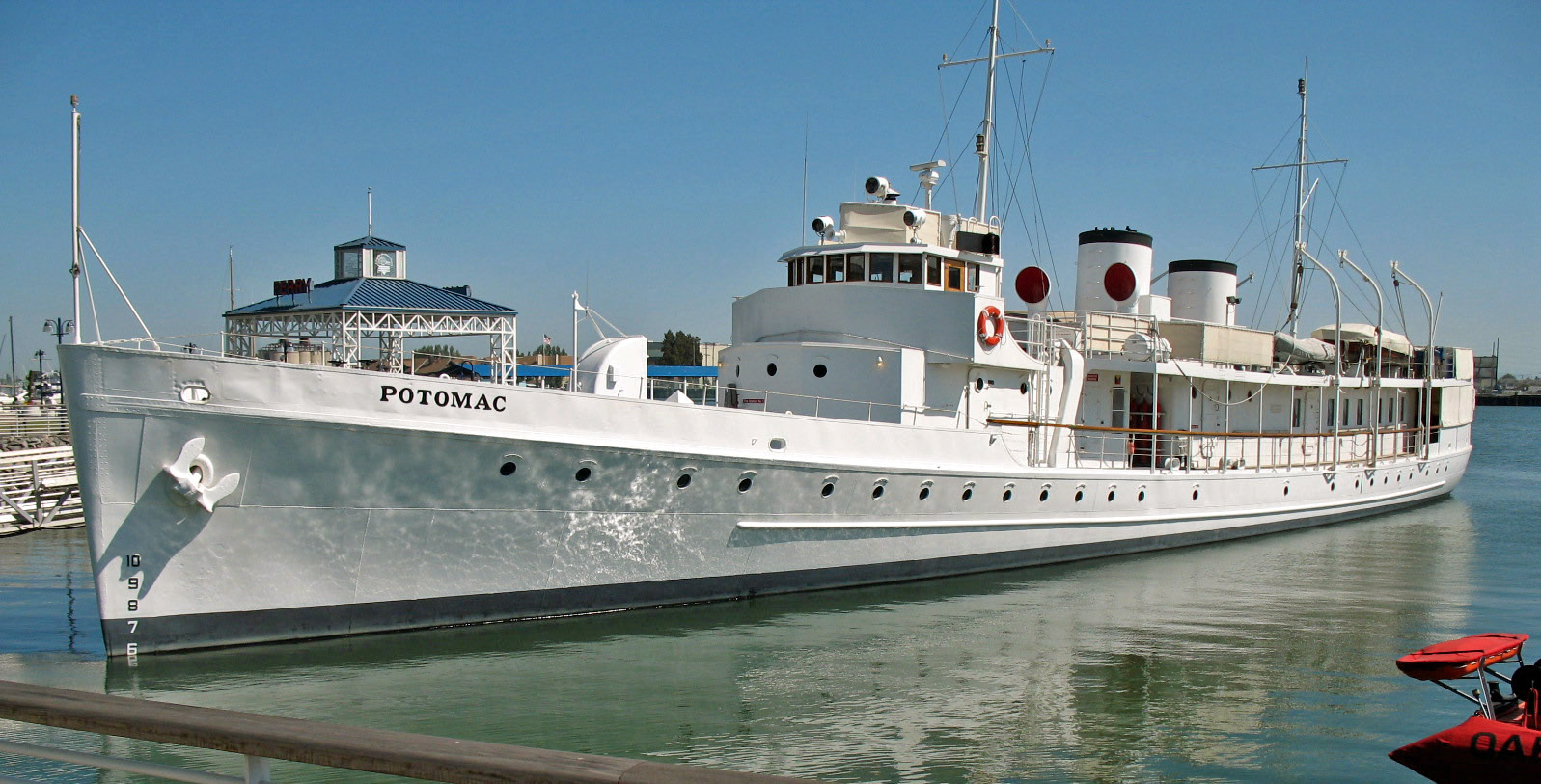
The USS Potomac at the Port of Oakland, California, in June 2009

From 1880 to 1977 several commissioned Navy ships served as presidential yachts, however this practice was halted during the Carter administration. The table below lists the name of each of these ships and the years in which it did so.

Name	Served from	Served until	Notes
USS Despatch (1873)	1880	1891	
USS Dolphin (PG-24)	1897	1897	The Dolphin, Sylph and Mayflower shared duty as the presidential yacht from 1897 to 1929.
USS Sylph (PY-5)	1902	1921	The Dolphin, Sylph and Mayflower shared duty as the presidential yacht from 1897 to 1929.
USS Mayflower (PY-1)	1905	1929	The Dolphin, Sylph and Mayflower shared duty as the presidential yacht from 1897 to 1929.
USS Sequoia (AG-23)	1933	1936	The Sequoia served two terms as presidential yacht: 1933–1936 and 1969–1977
USS Potomac (AG-25)	1936	1945	
USS Williamsburg (AGC-369)	1945	1953	
USS Sequoia (AG-23)	1969	1977	The Sequoia served two terms as presidential yacht: 1933–1936 and 1969–1977

== Other transportation ==
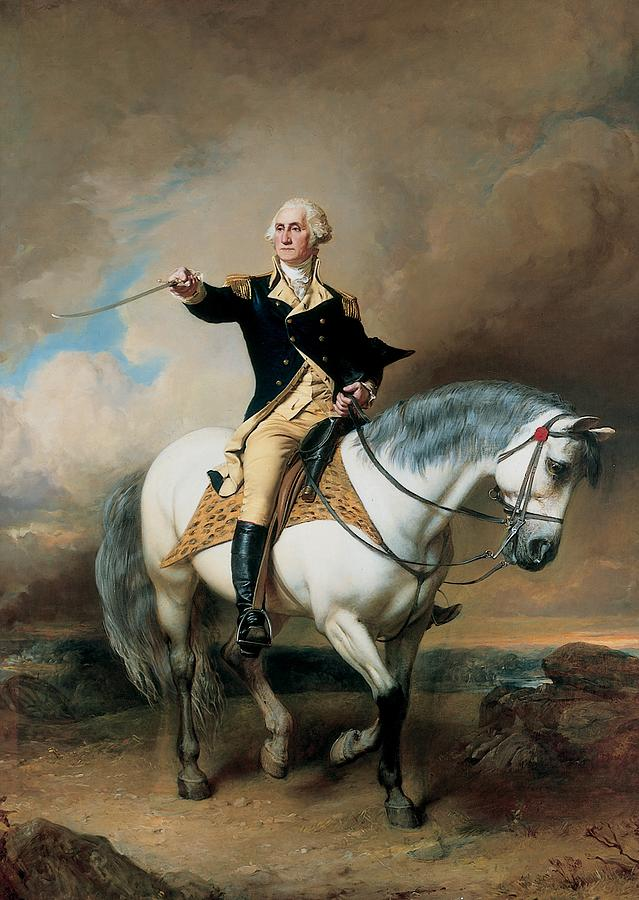
Portrait of George Washington Taking the Salute at Trenton by John Faed, featuring Blueskin

Presidents have been known to take other forms of transport historically, such as horses or bicycles. George Washington's favorite horse was called Blueskin, and was featured in some paintings with Washington.

Some presidents had favorite horses, see Category:United States presidential horses

== See also ==
- List of official vehicles of the president of the United States
- Air transports of heads of state and government
- Coach (carriage)
- Official state car
- Royal yacht
