= Ground Force One =

State motor coach of the president of the United States

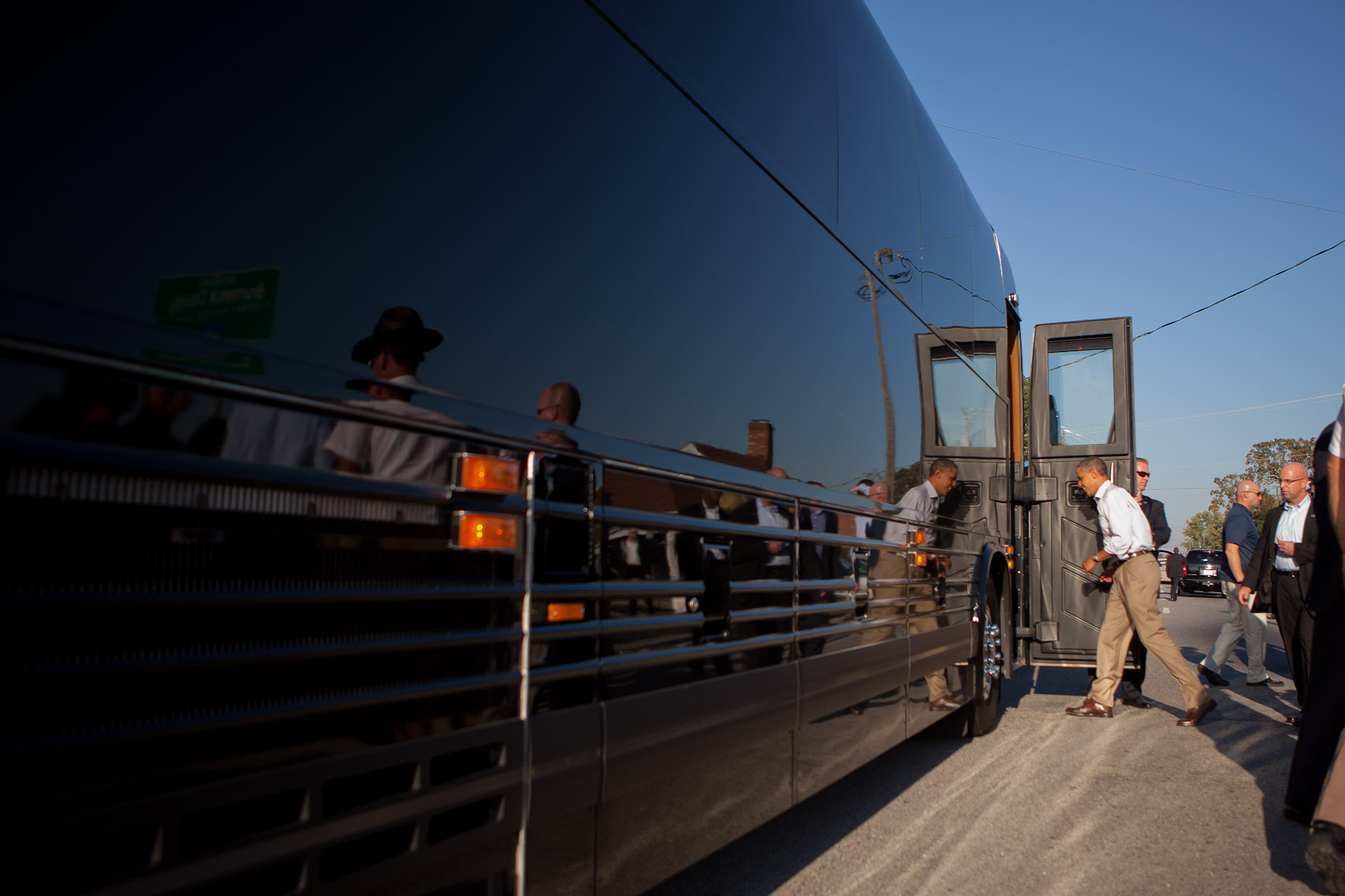
President Obama boards the bus in 2011.

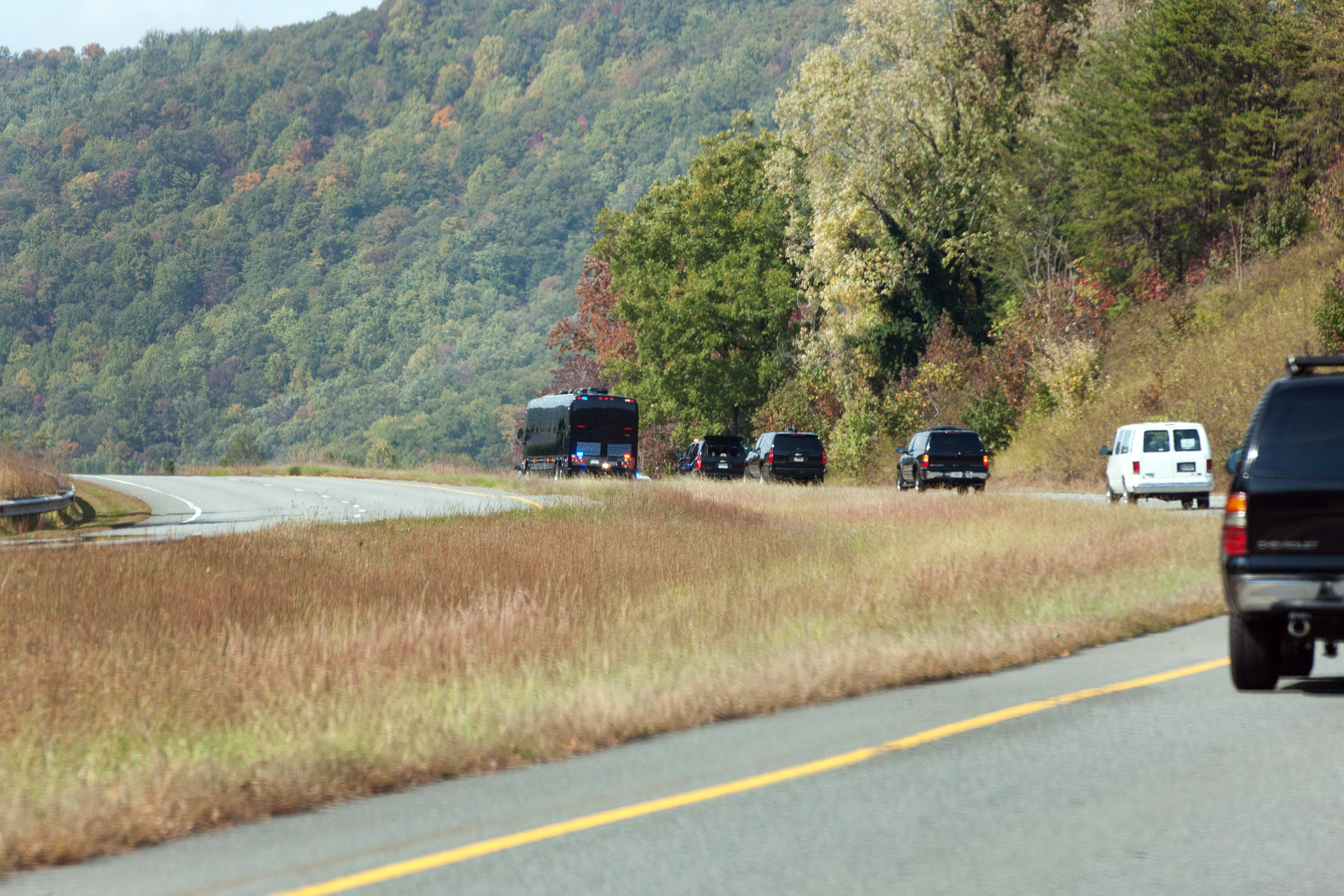
The president's bus leads a motorcade in 2011.

Ground Force One is the unofficial code-name for the black armored buses used to transport the president of the United States and other dignitaries. When the president was on board, one of the code names for the bus was "Stagecoach".

== History ==
The United States Secret Service formerly used rented buses as part of the presidential motorcade, retrofitted for secure communications where necessary. In August 2011, the Secret Service introduced the buses as new permanent additions to the federal government's fleet, initially used by Barack Obama in the campaign leading up to the 2012 presidential election. The bus was nicknamed "Ground Force One" following an unofficial solicitation for names held by Mike Allen, who announced the results on the Politico Playbook blog.

The model X3-45 VIP was designed and built as a conversion shell on a three-axle bus chassis by Quebec, Canada-based specialist firm Prevost Car, and then fitted out by Hemphill Brothers Coach Company in Nashville, Tennessee, to provide 505 square feet (46.9 m^{2}) of interior space, including flashing police-style red and blue lights on the front and the back. It was then further outfitted by the Secret Service with secure communications and other specialized equipment. The two buses cost $1.1 million each and were leased from Hemphill Brothers during the Obama administration. According to the Secret Service, Prevost was the only manufacturer that had a vehicle which could support the weight of the required security and communication equipment. Senator John McCain criticized Obama for using a Canadian-sourced bus, but the tour bus used by McCain during his 2008 "Straight Talk" tour was also built by Prevost.

The coaches are part of the federal government fleet and are painted plain black, but can be wrapped in campaign materials at the campaign's expense. In July 2012, the official Presidential Seal was applied to the side of the bus for a trip through Ohio and Pennsylvania. The second bus was used by Republican presidential nominee Mitt Romney during the campaign leading up to the 2012 presidential election, and then deployed as a back-up for visiting dignitaries.

In 2020, Mike Pence was transferred from Ground Force One to a limo after it was involved in a minor crash while traveling in western Pennsylvania. The bus was wrapped in Trump-Pence campaign livery and was not damaged.

A wrapped bus was used by the Harris-Walz campaign in 2024.

== See also ==
- Presidential state car
- Air Force One
- Army One
- Navy One
- Marine One
- Coast Guard One
- Executive One
