= Battle bus =

Battle bus may refer to:

- The British English term for campaign bus
- Armoured bus, a vehicle sometimes used for military applications
- Police bus, a vehicle sometimes used in riot control
- Armoured personnel carrier, sometimes called a "battle bus"
- The Battle Bus, a vehicle in the video game Fortnite Battle Royale
