= Airworthiness certificate =

Permit needed before an aircraft may fly

Type certificate or standard type certificate approval process for aircraft airworthiness.

A standard certificate of airworthiness is a permit for commercial passenger or cargo operation, issued for an aircraft by the civil aviation authority in the state/nation in which the aircraft is registered. For other aircraft such as crop-sprayers, a Special Airworthiness Certificate (not for commercial passenger or cargo operations) must be issued.

== Legal authority ==
A certificate of airworthiness (CoA), or an airworthiness certificate, is issued for an aircraft by the civil aviation authority in the state in which the aircraft is registered. The CoA attests that the aircraft is airworthy insofar as the aircraft conforms to its type design. Each certificate is issued in one of a number of different categories when the aircraft is registered in the name of the owner. Thereafter, a yearly currency fee is payable to renew the CoA. If this fee is not paid when due, the certificate expires and the owner must apply again for the certificate. The CoA can only be issued when a maintenance release or certificate of release to service (CRS) from the maintenance facility declares that the maintenance due has been carried out and the aircraft is then certified as being airworthy.

In the US, Australia and some other countries a CoA is classified as either a standard airworthiness certificate or a special airworthiness certificate.

== Standard airworthiness certificate ==
A standard airworthiness certificate is an airworthiness certificate issued for an aircraft by the civil aviation authority in the state in which the aircraft is registered. A standard airworthiness certificate is one of the certificates that are mandatory if an aircraft is to be used in commercial operations. In the US, Australia and some other countries, a standard airworthiness certificate is issued in one of the following categories:

- Transport
- Commuter
- Normal
- Utility
- Acrobatic
- Manned free balloons
- Special class of aircraft

The airworthiness certificate must be carried on board the aircraft and must be presented to a representative of the aviation authority upon request.

A standard airworthiness certificate remains valid as long as the aircraft meets its approved type design and is in a condition for safe operation. In the US, a standard airworthiness certificate remains effective providing the maintenance, preventive maintenance and alterations are performed in accordance with relevant requirements and the aircraft remains registered in the USA.

A standard airworthiness certificate ceases to be valid when the aircraft ceases to be registered. Change of ownership of an aircraft does not require re-issue or re-validation of that aircraft's standard airworthiness certificate.

In contrast to a standard airworthiness certificate, an aircraft may be issued with a special airworthiness certificate. Examples of aircraft which are not eligible for standard airworthiness certificates but may be eligible for special airworthiness certificates include agricultural aircraft, experimental aircraft, and some ex-military aircraft.

== Special airworthiness certificate ==
A special airworthiness certificate is an airworthiness certificate that is not sufficient to allow an aircraft to be used in commercial passenger or cargo operations. In the United States, a Special Airworthiness Certificate is issued in one or more of the following categories:

Category	Purpose(s)	Title 14 CFR Section
Primary	Aircraft flown for pleasure and personal use	21.24, 21.184
Restricted	Aircraft with a "restricted" category type certificate, including: Agricultural; Forest and wildlife conservation; Aerial surveying; Patrolling (pipelines, power lines); Weather control; Aerial advertising; Other operations specified by the Administrator	21.25, 21.185
Multiple	Multiple airworthiness certificates	21.187
Limited	Aircraft with a "limited" category type certificate	21.189
Light-Sport	Operate a light-sport aircraft, other than a gyroplane, kit-built, or transitioning ultralight like vehicle	21.190
Experimental	Research and development — an aircraft whose purpose is to test new design concepts, equipment, or operating techniques; Showing compliance with regulations — a prototype aircraft that is built for the purposes of demonstrating the airworthiness of a design; Crew training - an aircraft used solely for training that, for some reason, does not have a standard certificate (e.g. the NASA Shuttle Training Aircraft); Exhibition; Air racing; Market surveys — a sales demonstration aircraft; Operating amateur-built aircraft; Operating kit-built aircraft; Operating light-sport aircraft; Unmanned Aircraft Systems	21.191, 21.193, 21.195
Special Flight Permit (sometimes referred to as a "ferry permit")	Special-purpose flight of an aircraft that is capable of safe flight but might not meet applicable airworthiness requirements. Examples of such situations where one would be required are: Delivering a new aircraft to the purchaser or storage point; Conducting production flight tests; Conducting customer demonstration flights in a new aircraft that have passed or completed production flight tests; Excess weight operations; Evacuating an aircraft from impending danger; Flying aircraft to a point for repairs, alterations, maintenance, or storage. An example would be the cross-country flight of the Lockheed Constellation Columbine II, which was ferried on an SFP -after being made airworthy- from Marana, AZ to Bridgewater, Virginia for a complete restoration. Ferry permits sometimes come with conditions such as a maximum altitude, speed, or distance between stops as well as possibly flying with the landing gear extended the entire flight.	21.197
Provisional	Aircraft with a "provisional" category type certificate for special operations and operating limitations	Part 21 Subpart C, Part 21 Subpart I, Section 91.317

== See also ==
- Type certificate
- Joint Aviation Requirements

== Notes ==
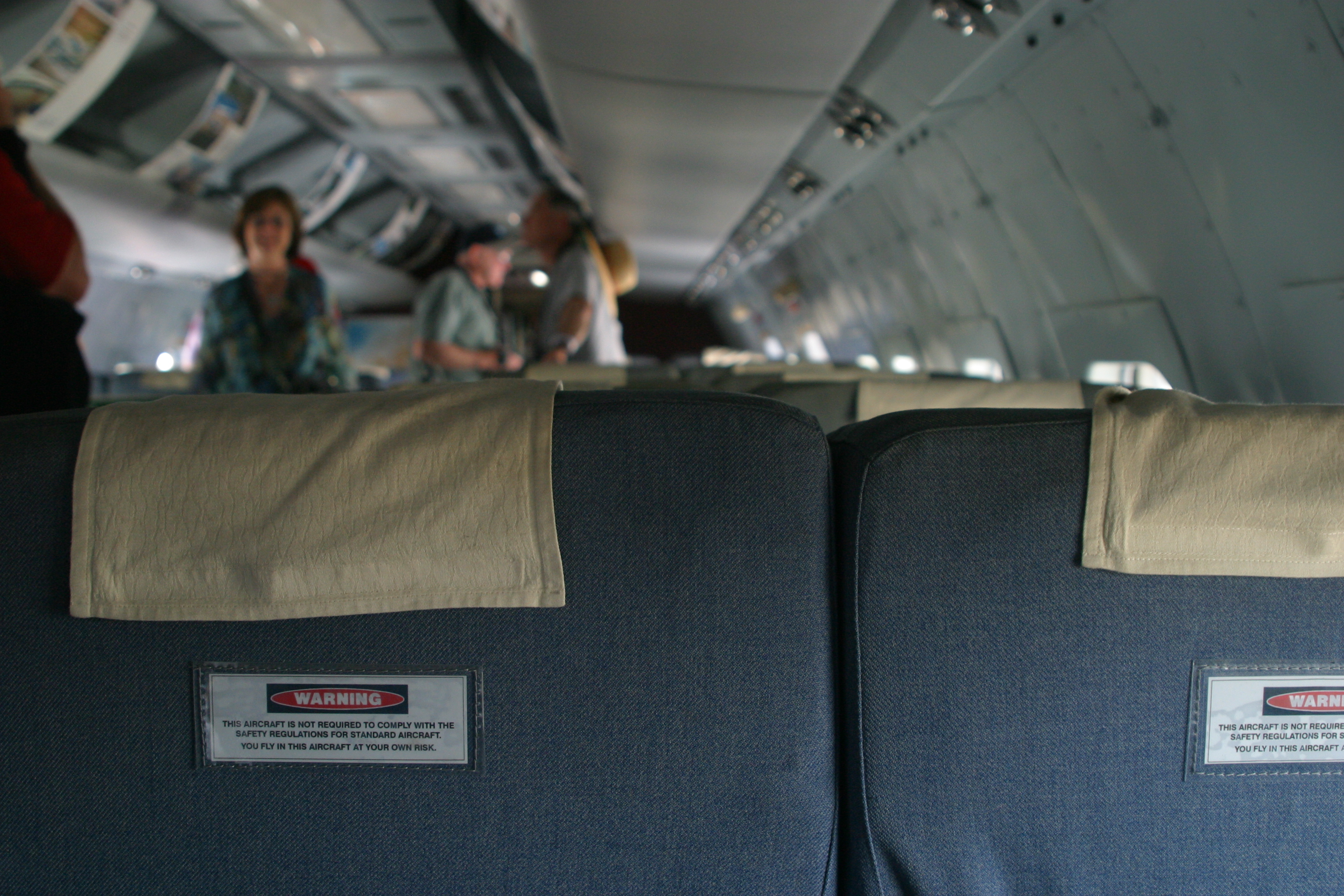
Interior of a Lockheed Super Constellation with a Special Airworthiness Certificate. The warning states "This aircraft is not required to comply with the safety regulations for standard aircraft. You fly in this aircraft at your own risk."
