= Executive One =

US call sign of presidential plane

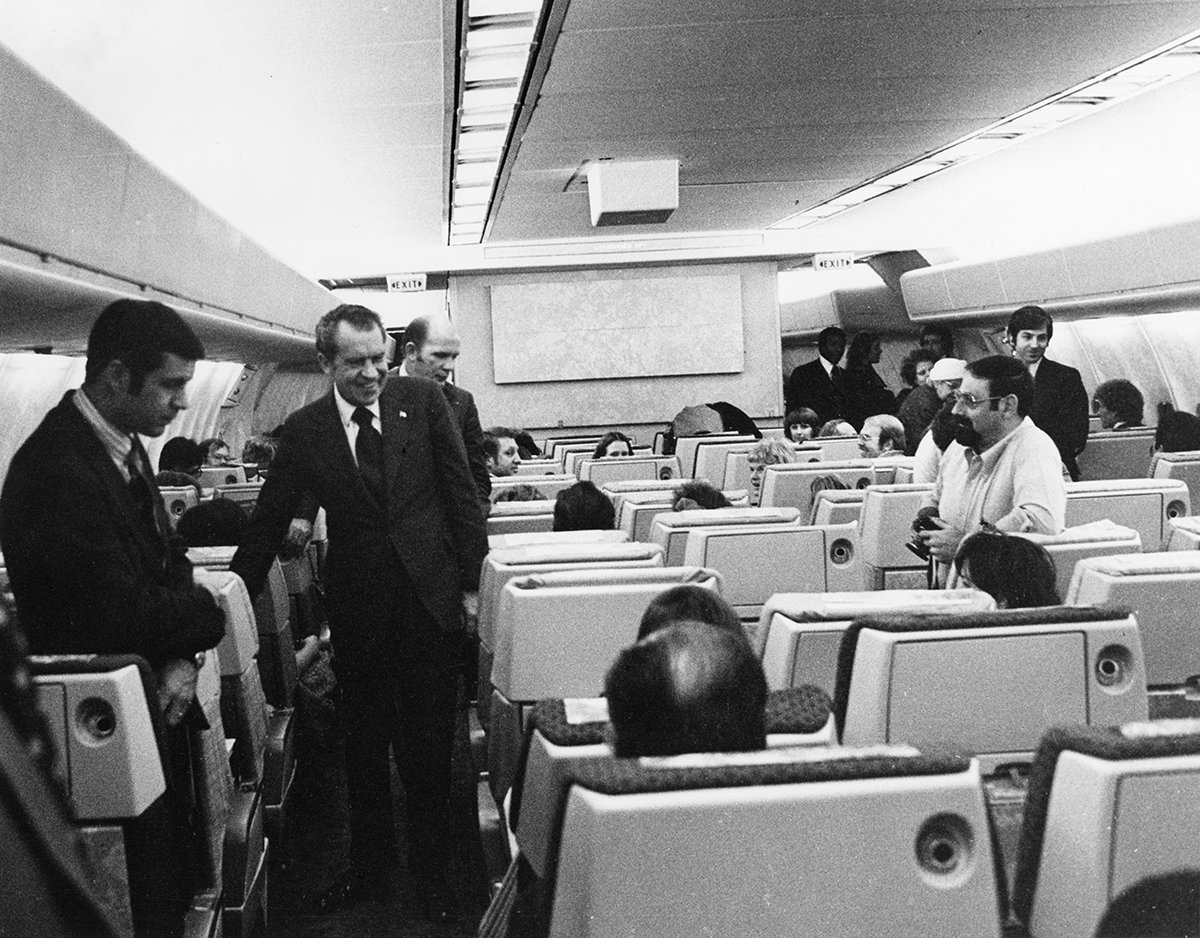
President Richard Nixon surprises passengers aboard a UAL commercial flight 55 between DC and LA.

Executive One is the call sign designated for any United States civil aircraft when the president of the United States is on board. Typically, the president flies in military aircraft that are under the command of the Presidential Airlift Group, which include the aircraft serving as Air Force One, Marine One, Army One, Navy One and Coast Guard One (the names are not permanently applied to the aircraft: they only apply to an aircraft flying with the president aboard).

On December 26, 1973, President Richard Nixon became the only sitting president to travel on a regularly scheduled commercial airline flight when he flew on United Airlines Flight 55 from Washington Dulles International Airport to Los Angeles International Airport, "to set an example for the rest of the nation during the current energy crisis" and to "demonstrate his confidence in the airlines". Nixon, first lady Pat Nixon, daughter Tricia Nixon, and 22 staffers, security, and pool purchased 13 first-class tickets at $217.64 and 12 coach tickets at $167.64 aboard the DC-10 on what was traditionally not a very busy flight, and, with an eye to security, quietly boarded the plane without fanfare to maintain secrecy prior to departure. A Nixon aide carried a suitcase-sized secure communication device on board the plane, so that the president could remain in contact with Washington in the event of an emergency.

If the president's family members are aboard, but not the president himself, the flight can, at the discretion of the White House staff or Secret Service, use the callsign Executive One Foxtrot (EXEC1F). "Foxtrot" is the phonetic alphabet designation for the letter "F", with that being the first letter of "family".

The military helicopter that normally has the call sign "Marine One" is assigned the "Executive One" call sign when it transports the outgoing president on their final flight from the Capitol, after the inauguration of their successor, as was done on January 20, 2009 for George W. Bush, January 20, 2017 for Barack Obama, and January 20, 2025 for Joe Biden.

== Executive Two ==
Executive Two is the call sign designated for any United States civil aircraft when the vice president of the United States is on board. Typically, however, the vice president flies in military aircraft that are under the command of the Air Mobility Command's 89th Airlift Wing, based at Joint Base Andrews in Prince George's County, Maryland.

One notable exception was when Nelson Rockefeller was named Gerald Ford's vice president in 1974. He owned a Grumman Gulfstream II jet that he preferred to the much slower prop powered Convair C-131 Samaritan that was then the primary Air Force Two aircraft. Being a private plane, the Gulfstream's call sign was Executive Two while Rockefeller was in office and on board.

On February 2, 2000, a bill was on the Senate agenda that looked as if it might end up in a tie, requiring the vice president to cast the tie breaking vote. A US Airways Shuttle flight was the fastest way to get from New York City, where Vice President Al Gore was, back to the Capitol. As it turned out, his vote was not needed.

If the vice president's family members are aboard, but not the vice president themself, the flight can optionally use the callsign Executive Two Foxtrot, just like Executive One Foxtrot.

== See also ==
- Transportation of the president of the United States
