= Armoured bus =

Type of bus protected with armour

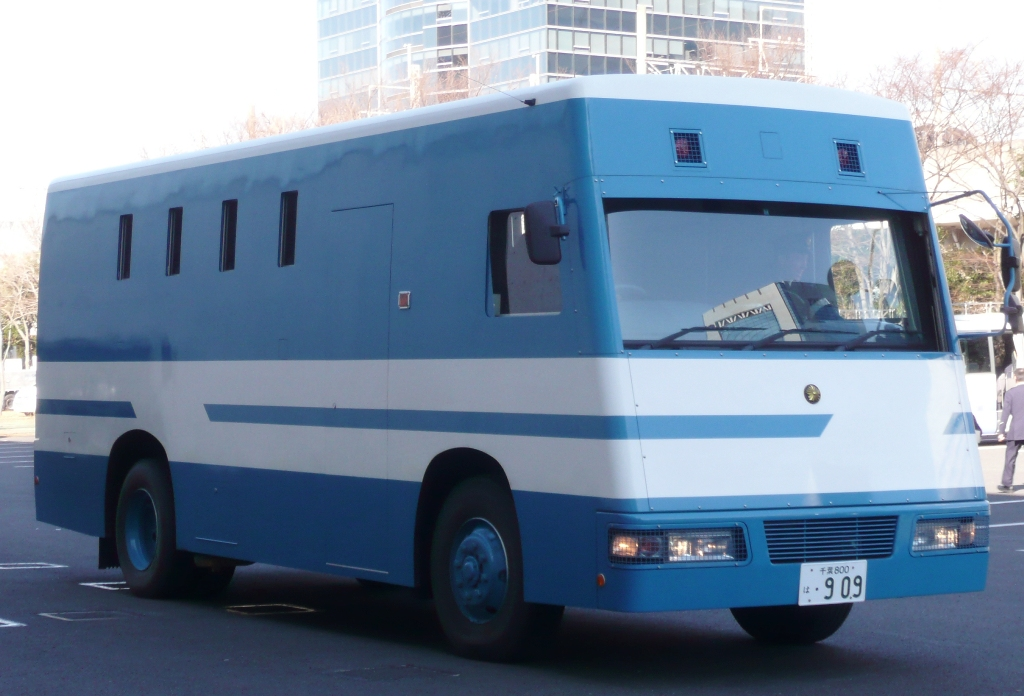
Armoured police bus in Japan

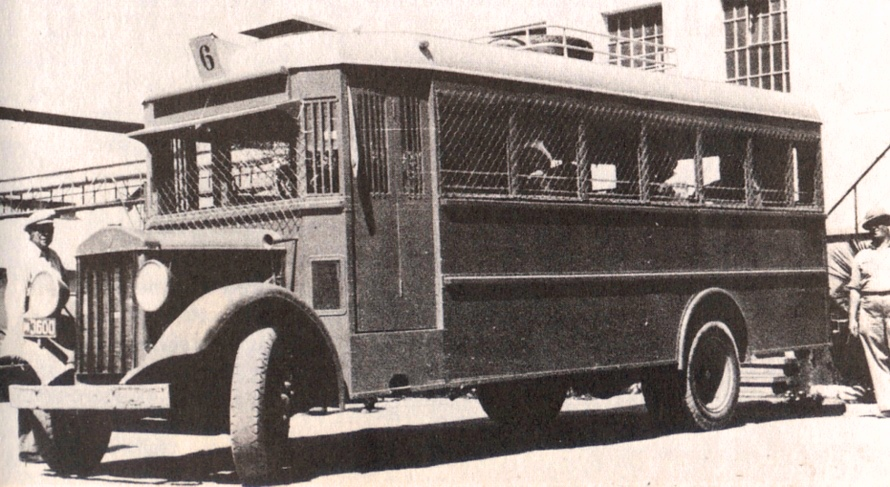
Armoured bus serving the Jewish population during the 1936–1939 Arab revolt in Palestine

An armoured bus or armored bus is a type of bus which provides increased protection for passengers, usually against small arms and improvised explosive devices. The bus can be a stock commercial bus with retro-fitted vehicle armour as well as bulletproof glass, or a specially built military armoured vehicle. Lighter armoured buses are also used for prisoner transport.

== History ==
One of the first armoured vehicles to be used in combat was the Schneider-Brillié which was built from the chassis of a Schneider P2-4000 bus

During World War I, civilian buses were pressed into service, especially by Great Britain and France, fulfilling several roles: to transport troops, supplies, and livestock, and as ambulances and mobile surgeries. Britain used several hundred Daimler and LGOC B-type buses as troop transports, but they were not armoured. It was found that the windows were frequently broken by troops' equipment, and the glass was eventually removed. Wooden planks were fixed over the apertures, offering protection from the weather but not from hostile fire.

Armoured buses weigh considerably more than ordinary buses. As a result, they use more fuel, are prone to mechanical breakdowns, have very high maintenance costs and wear out faster.

== Use of armoured buses ==
Israel's Egged bus company says that all its bus lines in the West Bank use bulletproof buses. Armored buses were considered the safest form of civilian transport on routes to and from the Israeli settlements, although questions have been raised about how effective such buses are. It was estimated the number of fatalities would be lower in the event of attacks on armored vehicles, but this has not always been the case. Some Israeli school buses are armored due to the threat of terrorist attacks.

== Manufacturers ==
Merkavim Ltd., an Israeli bus manufacturer jointly owned by the Volvo Buses and Mayer Cars & Trucks Ltd., has been producing armored buses since 1946. Its manufacturing facility in the Caesarea industrial park produces a wide range of buses for the local and international markets.

== See also ==
- Armoured personnel carrier
- Ground Force One
- List of buses
- Non-military armoured vehicles
- Police transport
