= Columbine II =

Airplane used by President Eisenhower

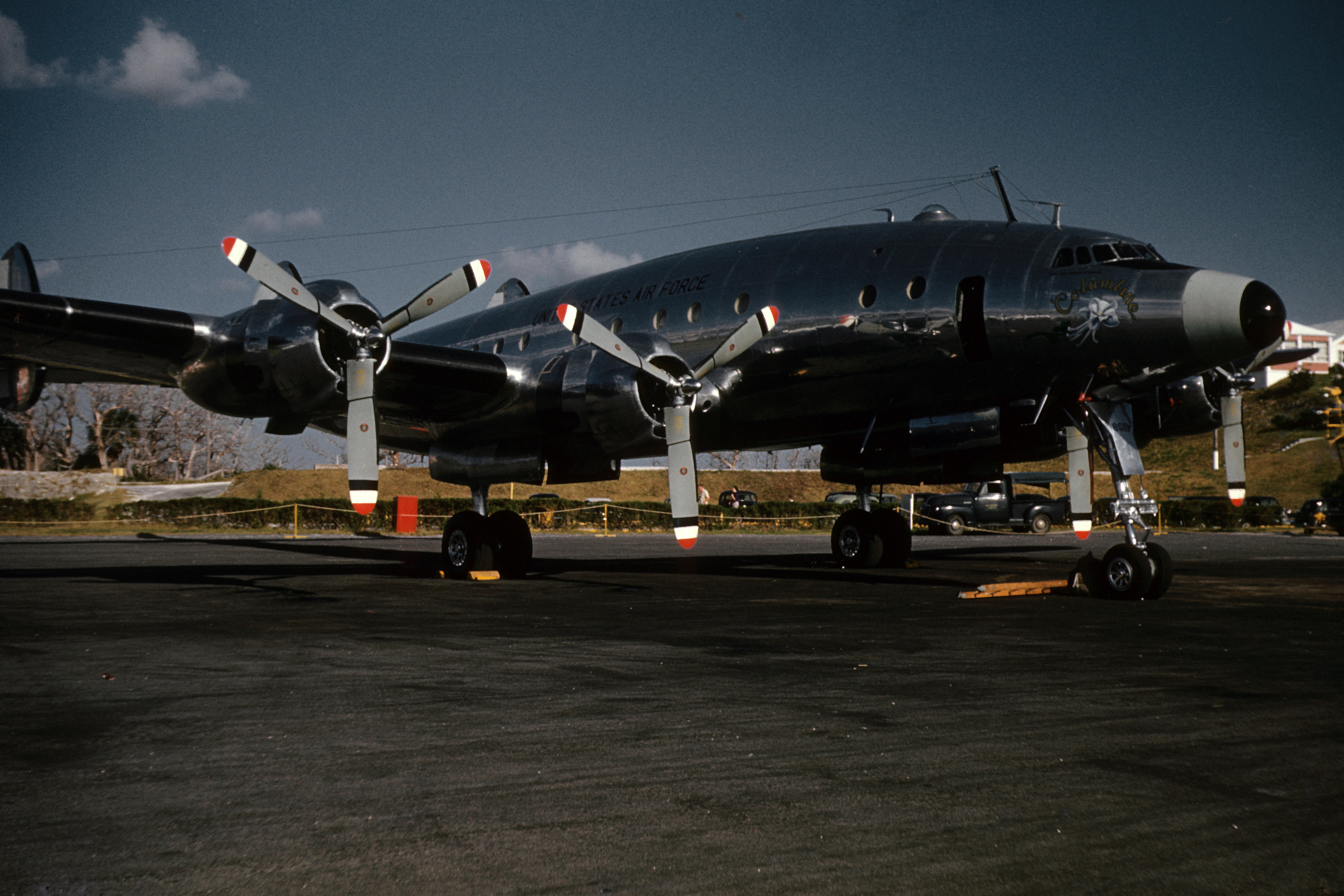
- Columbine II in Bermuda in 1953 for the Western Summit

General information
- Type: Lockheed VC-121A-LO Constellation (Model 749-79-36)
- Manufacturer: Lockheed Aircraft Corporation
- Registration: N9463
- Serial: 48-0610

History
- In service: January 1953 to November 1954 as President Eisenhower's personal aircraft
- Last flight: March 2016
- Preserved at: Conditionally airworthy (2016)

Columbine II is a Lockheed VC-121A-LO Constellation (Air Force Serial Number 48-8610, Lockheed Model 749–79–36); the aircraft that was to become the first plane to use the Air Force One callsign and the only presidential aircraft ever sold to a private party. The aircraft was ferried from long-term storage in the Sonoran Desert at Marana Regional Airport, Arizona, to the east coast for restoration in March 2016.

The aircraft was ordered and named by U.S. President Eisenhower. It was named Columbine II because he had earlier flown on a Constellation named Columbine when he was a general in the U.S. Army. It became the first aircraft to use the call sign "Air Force One" when the President was aboard after a near miss due to confusion with callsigns. It was decided that any Air Force aircraft with the president on board would use the call sign "Air Force One".

== Presidential aircraft ==
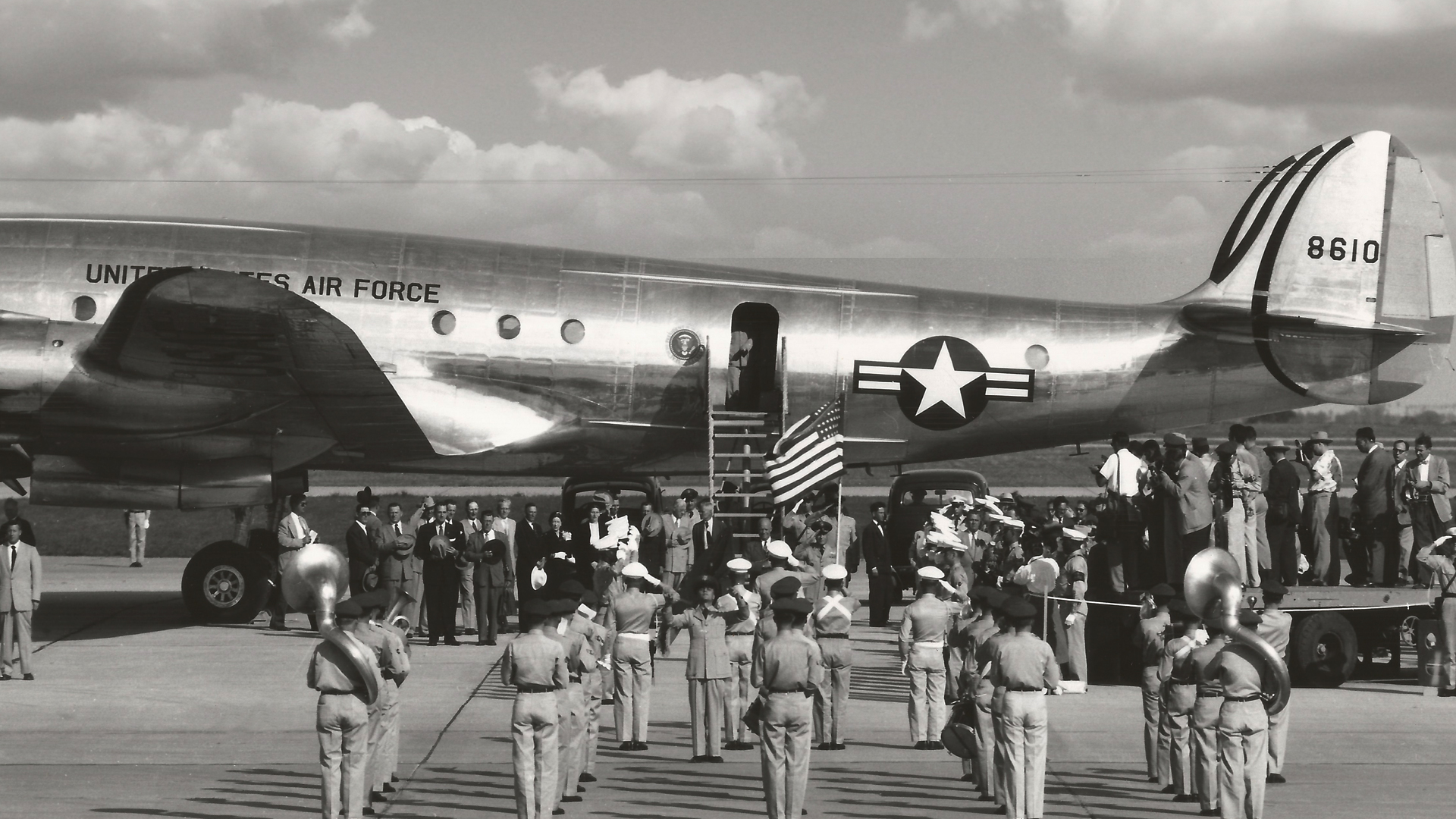
President Dwight D. Eisenhower lands aboard the aircraft in Texas, 1953

Columbine II was built as a C-121A, a military version of the aircraft, at Burbank, California. It bailed to Lockheed to support the Lockheed Air Service International maintenance facility at Keflavík, Iceland. In November 1952, President-elect Dwight D. Eisenhower used the aircraft to travel to South Korea. Early in 1953 this aircraft was converted to VC-121A-LO standard, for use by President Eisenhower, until replaced in 1959 by Columbine III (VC-121E-LO, AF Ser. No. 53-7885), operated by the 1254th Air Transport Squadron of the United States Air Force (USAF).

Eisenhower flew on a Constellation named Columbine for the state flower of Colorado before his presidency to make trips across the Atlantic as a U.S. General. As president he ordered another Lockheed Constellation, fitted out with greater amenities; he named it Columbine II.

The aircraft was built in 1948 and was the presidential aircraft for President Eisenhower from 1954 to 1959. Before this, he flew in a smaller Aero Commander L-26B. Columbine II was supplemented by Columbine III, another Lockheed Constellation preserved at the National Museum of the United States Air Force. Columbine II was replaced by a Boeing 707 for presidential transport.

== Preservation ==
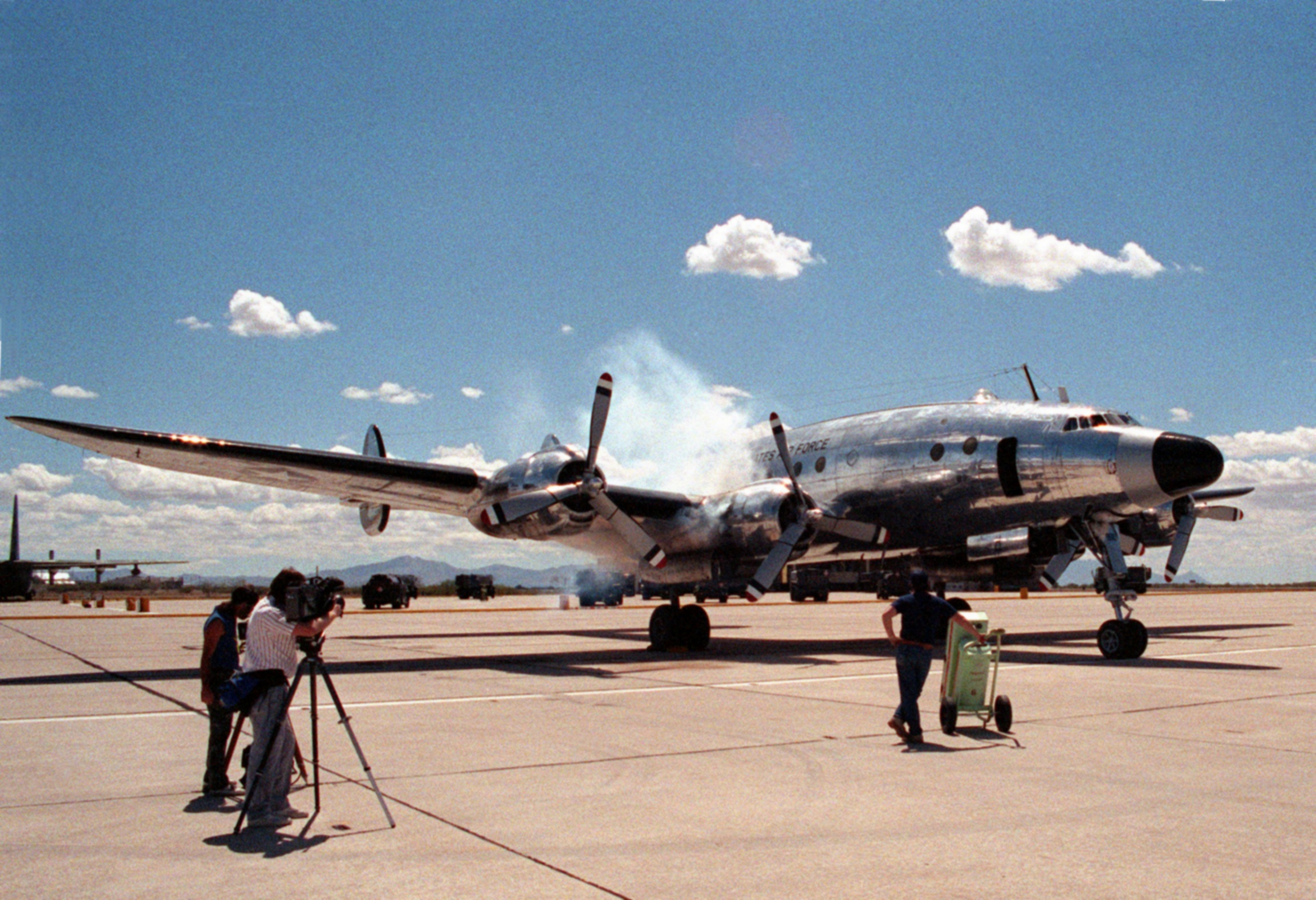
Columbine II starting engines at Davis-Monthan AFB in 1990 for her final flight to Marana Airport

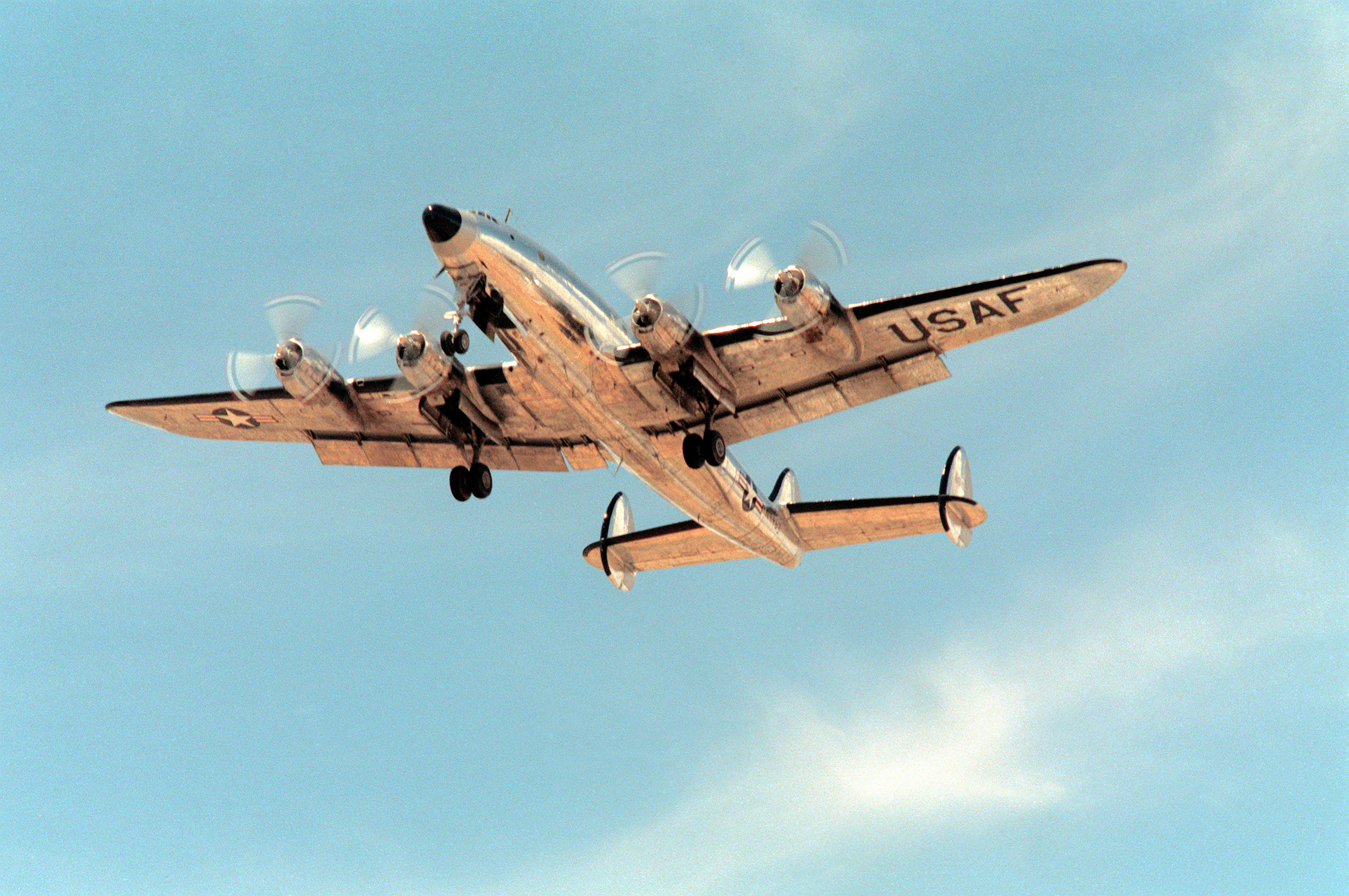
Columbine II takes off from Davis-Monthan base in 1990

After being replaced, Columbine II continued in service with the United States Air Force until retired to Davis–Monthan Air Force Base for storage during the late 1960s. The aircraft was sold as part of a package lot to Mel Christler, a Wyoming businessman who owned a crop-dusting service, and was made airworthy in 1989 and flown to Abilene, Kansas for Eisenhower's 100th birthday celebration and to an air show at Andrews Air Force Base, Maryland. In 2003, it was flown to Marana Regional Airport, Arizona.

The aircraft owner was considering cutting the aircraft up as scrap when the Smithsonian Institution, during a research project, contacted the owner and informed him that 48-0610 was, in fact, a former presidential aircraft. The owner then, in the hope of finding a new owner willing to display the aircraft, attempted to sell the plane at auction, but it was not sold.

Columbine II was purchased and moved from Arizona to Bridgewater, Virginia, in March 2016 for restoration by Dynamic Aviation. The purchase price has not been disclosed, but the purchaser, Karl D. Stoltzfus Sr., founder of Dynamic Aviation, has said it was less than $1.5 million. Dynamic Aviation mechanics did significant work on the plane in Arizona in preparation for its flight to Virginia. The restoration is expected to take several years to complete.

In November 2020, Karl Stoltzfus died, one of the chief drivers of the project, but the company vowed to continue the restoration though with a reduced staff on the project. The company appointed a new director to the First Air Force One project, which hopes to take the aircraft on tour around the United States.

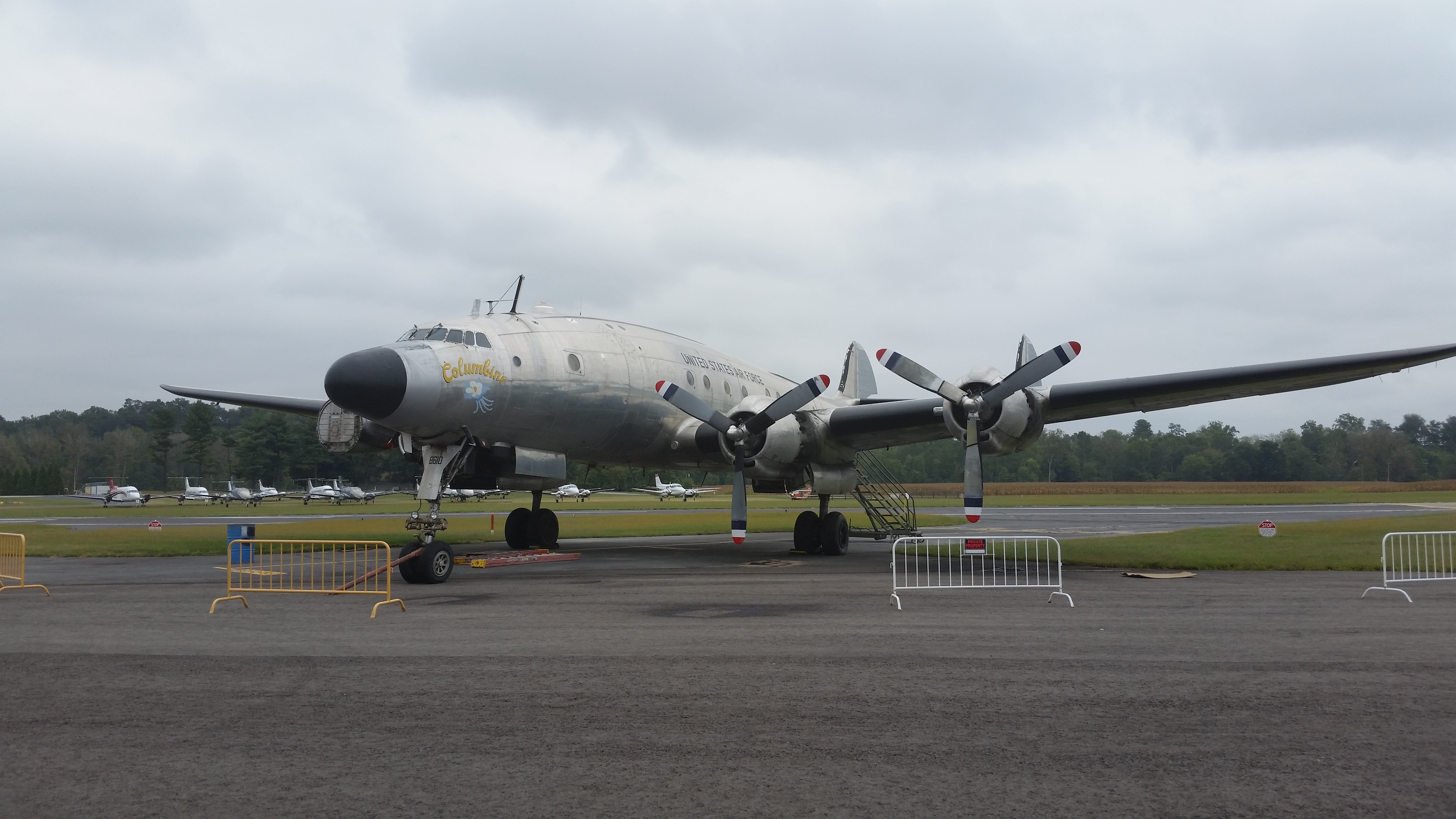
"Columbine II" undergoing restoration at Bridgewater Air Park, Bridgewater, Virginia - September 2016

== Call-sign "Air Force One" ==
Columbine II was the first plane to bear the call sign Air Force One. This designation for the U.S. Air Force aircraft carrying the incumbent president was established after an incident in 1953, when "Eastern Air Lines 8610", a commercial flight, crossed paths with "Air Force 8610", which was carrying President Eisenhower.

== See also ==
- Transportation of the president of the United States
