= Lockheed C-121 Constellation =

Military transport version of Constellation

C-121/R7O/R7V Constellation
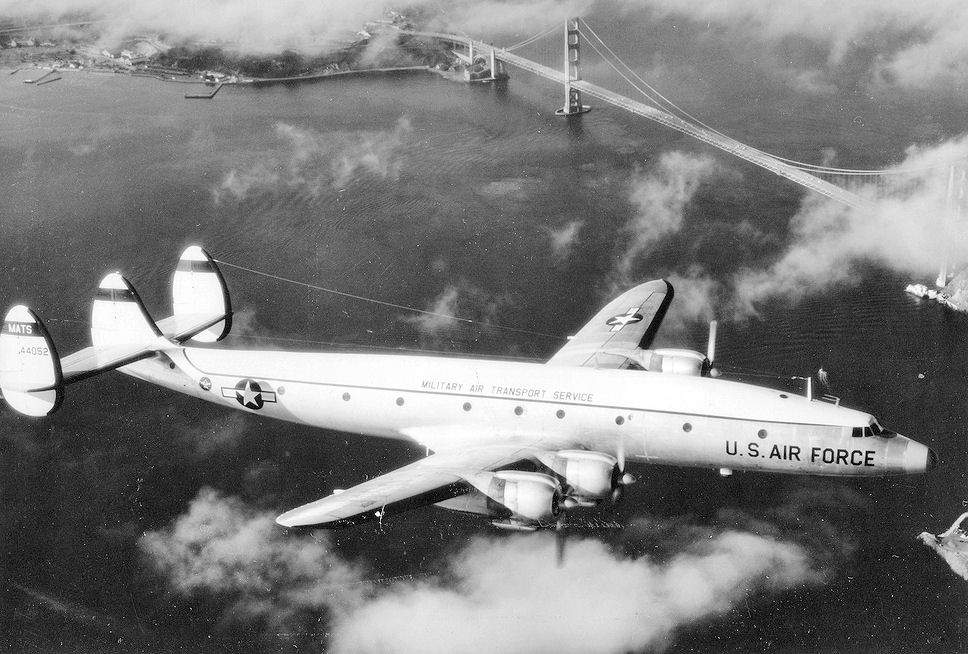
- A Military Air Transport Service C-121G Super Constellation flying near the Golden Gate Bridge.

General information
- Type: Military transport
- National origin: United States
- Manufacturer: Lockheed Corporation
- Status: Retired from military service, two operated by civilian preservation organisations
- Primary user: United States Air Force; United States Navy
- Number built: 332

History
- Manufactured: 1947 to 1958
- Introduction date: November 12, 1948
- First flight: March 14, 1947
- Developed from: L-749 Constellation; L-1049 Super Constellation
- Variants: R7V-2/YC-121F Constellation; EC-121 Warning Star

The Lockheed C-121 Constellation is a military transport version of the Lockheed Constellation. A total of 332 aircraft were constructed for both the United States Air Force and United States Navy for various purposes. Numerous airborne early warning versions were also constructed. The C-121 later saw service with smaller civilian operators until 1993.

== Design and development ==
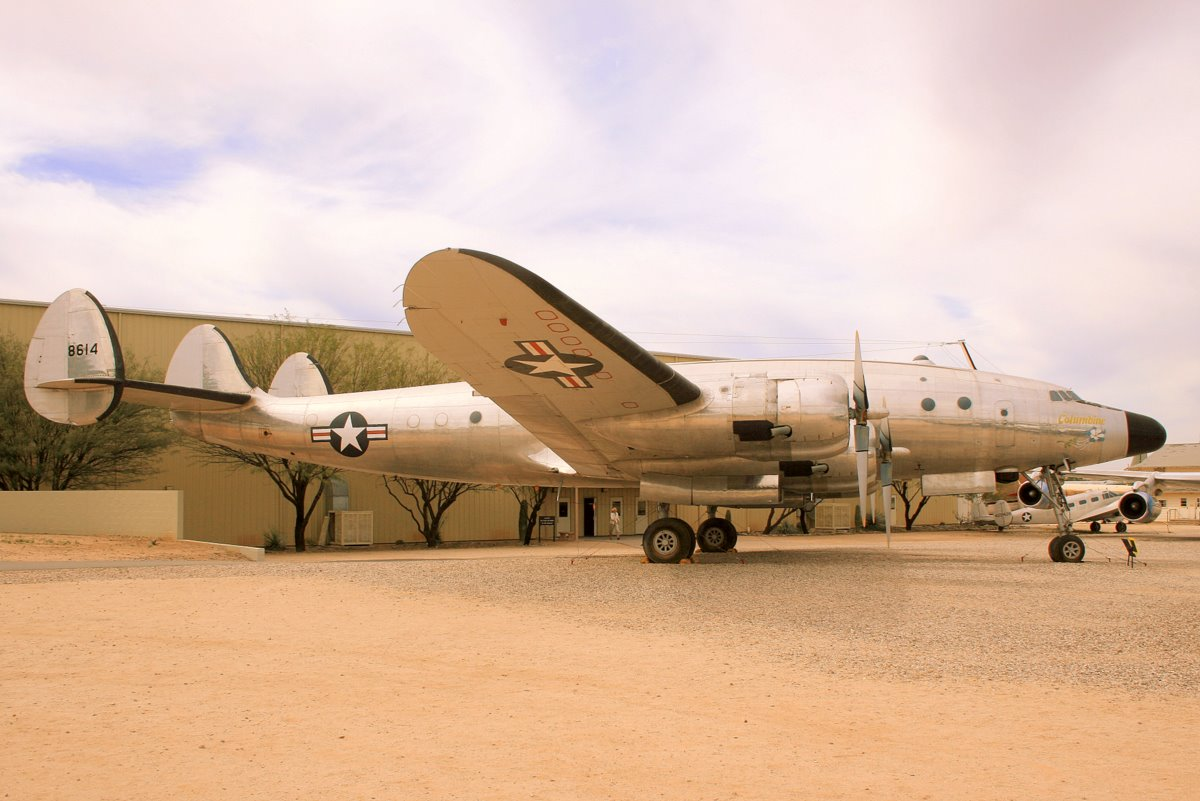
VC-121A 48-0614 Columbine, the personal transport of General Dwight D. Eisenhower, on display at the Pima Air & Space Museum

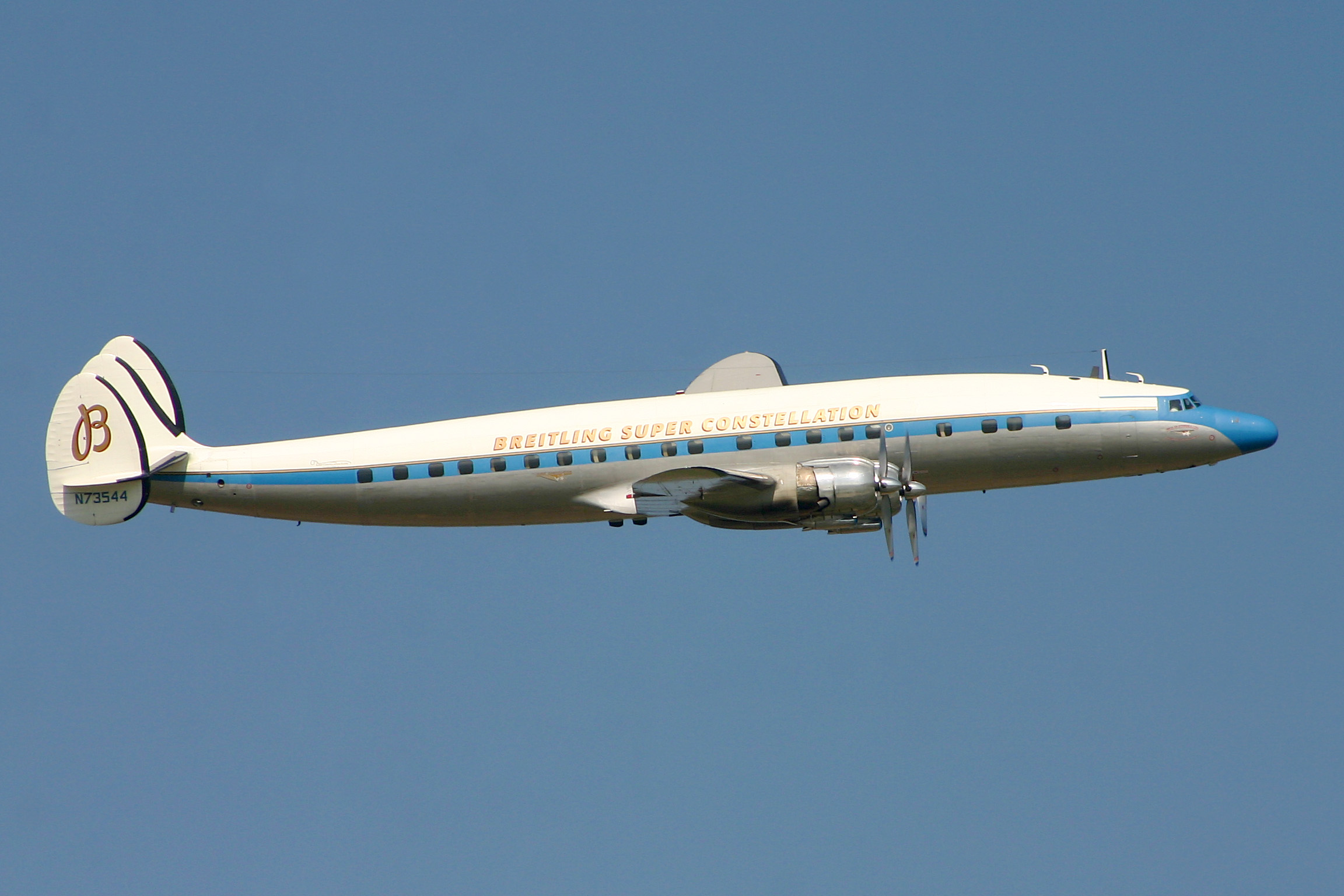
A C-121C aircraft, formerly USAF 54-0153, operated by the Super Constellation Flyers Association in Switzerland

Lockheed's first attempt at a military version of the Constellation airliner had been unsuccessful. This was largely due to the problems encountered by the Wright R-3350 engines that powered the aircraft. After the war, the few military Constellations built (designated C-69) were retrofitted by Lockheed for use in the post-war airline industry as the L-049.

In 1947, Lockheed unveiled a more economical Constellation, designated the L-749. It had increased fuel capacity and a more economical version of the R-3350. However, Lockheed had lost 1200 workers that year, and by 1948, production of the L-749 was at a near halt. It was then that the United States Air Force (USAF) signed a contract with Lockheed for ten L-749A aircraft designated the C-121A. The United States Navy (USN) had also placed an order for two AWACS versions of the L-749A designated the PO-1W (later WV-1). The first L-749A variants off the production line were for the US military.

The C-121A versions differed from the L-749 only through having a reinforced floor to handle cargo, and a large aft loading door. Although originally intended for cargo transport duties, they were usually fitted out with 44-seat passenger transport interiors. The aircraft also consisted of a five-man crew with four relief crew members on standby. All C-121As were assigned to the Atlantic division of the Military Air Transport Service (MATS). The aircraft would later see service in the Berlin Airlift. Dwight Eisenhower and General Douglas MacArthur both used the C-121A as their personal VIP transports. In 1950, six of the C-121A Constellations were modified as VIP transports and redesignated VC-121A. The last C-121As were retired in 1968.

In August 1950, the USN ordered eleven passenger/cargo convertible versions of Lockheed's stretched L-1049B Super Constellation (which it had already ordered as the WV-2 AWACS platform). These aircraft, originally designated R7O, were delivered before the WV-2 aircraft due to the R7O being more simple to produce. The R7O (now R7V-1) first flew in 1952. The R7V-1 was able to be quickly converted between a passenger transport for 97-107 individuals or a cargo carrying transport in two hours. The Navy reduced the number of available seats to fit room for life rafts on overseas flights. 73 stretchers could also be used for medical evacuation flights. The R7V-1s saw service over the Atlantic and Pacific in squadrons VR-1 (the oldest transport squadron in the Navy), VR-7 and VR-8. Two modified R7V-1 aircraft were used on Antarctic supply missions while conducting tests and observations at the same time. One crashed on landing in 1970 and remains at the spot to the present day; the other was retired in 1971. In 1962, 32 of the 50 R7V-1 aircraft in Naval service were transferred to the Air Force, being re-designated the C-121G. The remaining 18 in Naval service were redesignated C-121J. One C-121J was later used by the Blue Angels until it was replaced by a Lockheed C-130 Hercules in 1971.

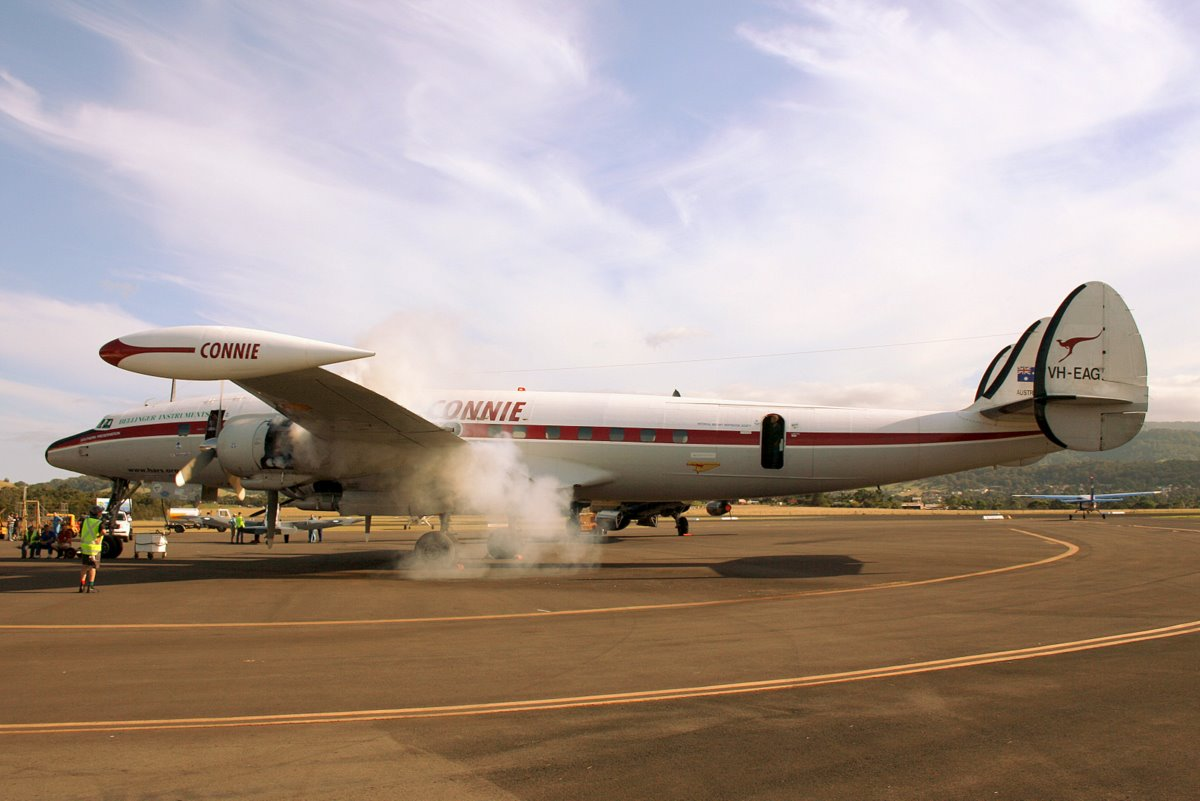
The former USAF 54-0154, a C-121C operated by the Historical Aircraft Restoration Society fitted with non-standard wingtip fuel tanks, starts one of its engines

The USAF had also ordered 33 L-1049F Super Constellations in 1951, designated the C-121C. Unlike its Naval equivalent, the C-121C featured square cabin windows instead of round ones. Otherwise, the C-121C resembled the USN R7V-1 aircraft. The C-121C also featured a reinforced structure to handle turboprop engines if necessary. Other features of the C-121C included an Auxiliary Power Unit, Turbo-compound R-3350s, and the ability to carry 75 passengers, 72 fully equipped troops, or 47 stretchers. The seats could be stored under the floor of the aircraft when needed for cargo use. The first flight of a C-121C was in 1955. Deliveries began in August 1955, with aircraft being assigned to the MATS Atlantic division. The aircraft were later in service with the Air National Guard (ANG) and were retired in 1973. Four were later refitted as VC-121C VIP aircraft, six as EC-121S TV and radio broadcast relay systems, two became EC-121C Microwave Airborne Radio Communications (MARCOM) systems and one was converted to a DC-121C observation aircraft.

A video of the Super Constellation Flyers Association's C-121C in flight.

After their retirement from military service, some C-121s and R7V-1s were used by civilian operators as cargo aircraft. The last operators were small Dominican Republic cargo airlines that operated to Miami with surplus military Constellations bought from Davis-Monthan Air Force Base. The operations stopped in 1993 after the Federal Aviation Administration (FAA) banned these operators from flying into the United States due to safety concerns. One former C-121C flies today with the Historical Aircraft Restoration Society of Australia, and the other flew until 2016 with the Super Constellation Flyers Association of Switzerland. The Swiss example was put up for sale in April 2023.

== Variants ==
=== Air Force ===
C-121A
Initial variant, based on the civil L-749 Constellation. Nine built.
VC-121A
Six C-121A transports converted to VIP use. Originally designated PC-121A.
VC-121B
Similar to the VC-121A, but with the cargo door replaced by a smaller passenger door. One built.
C-121C
Initial variant based on the L-1049 Super Constellation. 33 built.
VC-121C
VIP conversion of four C-121C aircraft.

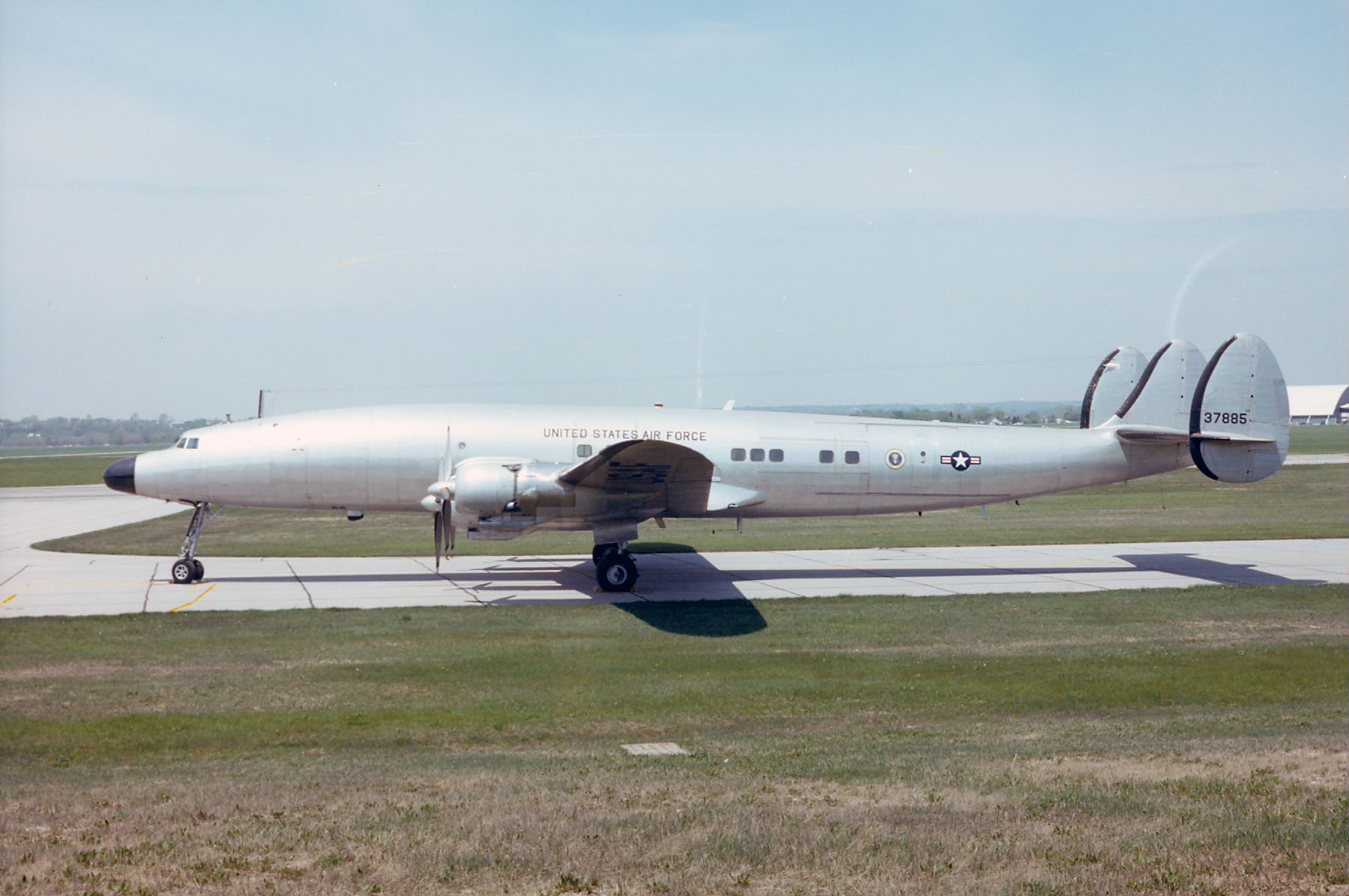
President Dwight D. Eisenhower's personal VC-121E, called Columbine III.

VC-121E
Ordered by the United States Navy as a R7V-1 but modified before delivery as a presidential transport for the United States Air Force.
YC-121F
Two former United States Navy R7V-2s with Pratt & Whitney T34 turboprop engines transferred to the United States Air Force. Designated L-1249A by Lockheed.
C-121G
Redesignation of 32 R7V-1 transports transferred from the USN to the Air Force.
TC-121G
Three C-121Gs converted to AWACS crew trainers.
VC-121G
One C-121G converted to a VIP transport.

=== Navy ===
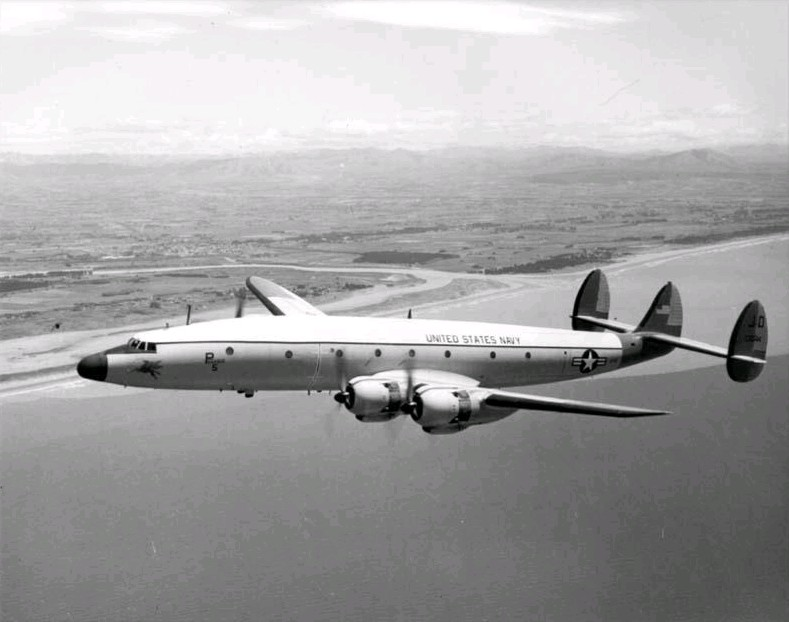
C-121J in flight 1965. This aircraft called Pegasus crashed in Antarctica in 1970, thus giving its name to Pegasus Airfield

R7V-1
Initial Navy version based on the L-1049. 50 built. Originally designated R7O.
R7V-1P
One R7V-1 modified for Antarctic service.
R7V-2
Two transport aircraft similar to the YC-121F. Also designated L-1249A. Two built.
C-121J
18 remaining R7V-1s redesignated.
TC-121J
Electronic testbed. One converted.
NC-121J
Four C-121J aircraft converted to television broadcasting aircraft for use in Vietnam. Project Jenny ( Blue Eagles ) VXN-8
VC-121J
Four C-121J aircraft converted for VIP use. One operated with the Blue Angels.

== Surviving aircraft ==
Airworthy

- AF serial no. 48-613 – "Bataan" – VC-121A transport once assigned to General of the Army Douglas MacArthur, owned and operated by Rod Lewis and managed by his company Lewis Air Legends.
- AF serial no. 54-0157 - C-121C originally of the 1608th Air Transport Wing. Restored, owned and operated by the Historical Aircraft Restoration Society in Australia as VH-EAG

Static display

- AF serial no. 54-0177 - C-121C of the West Virginia Air National Guard on static display at the Smithsonian Institution's Steven F. Udvar-Hazy Center in Chantilly, Virginia

Under restoration

- AF Ser. No. 48-610 – "Columbine II" – VC-121A transport which was the first aircraft to use the call sign Air Force One while carrying the President of the United States, privately owned in Bridgewater, Virginia.

== Specifications (C-121A / L-749A) ==
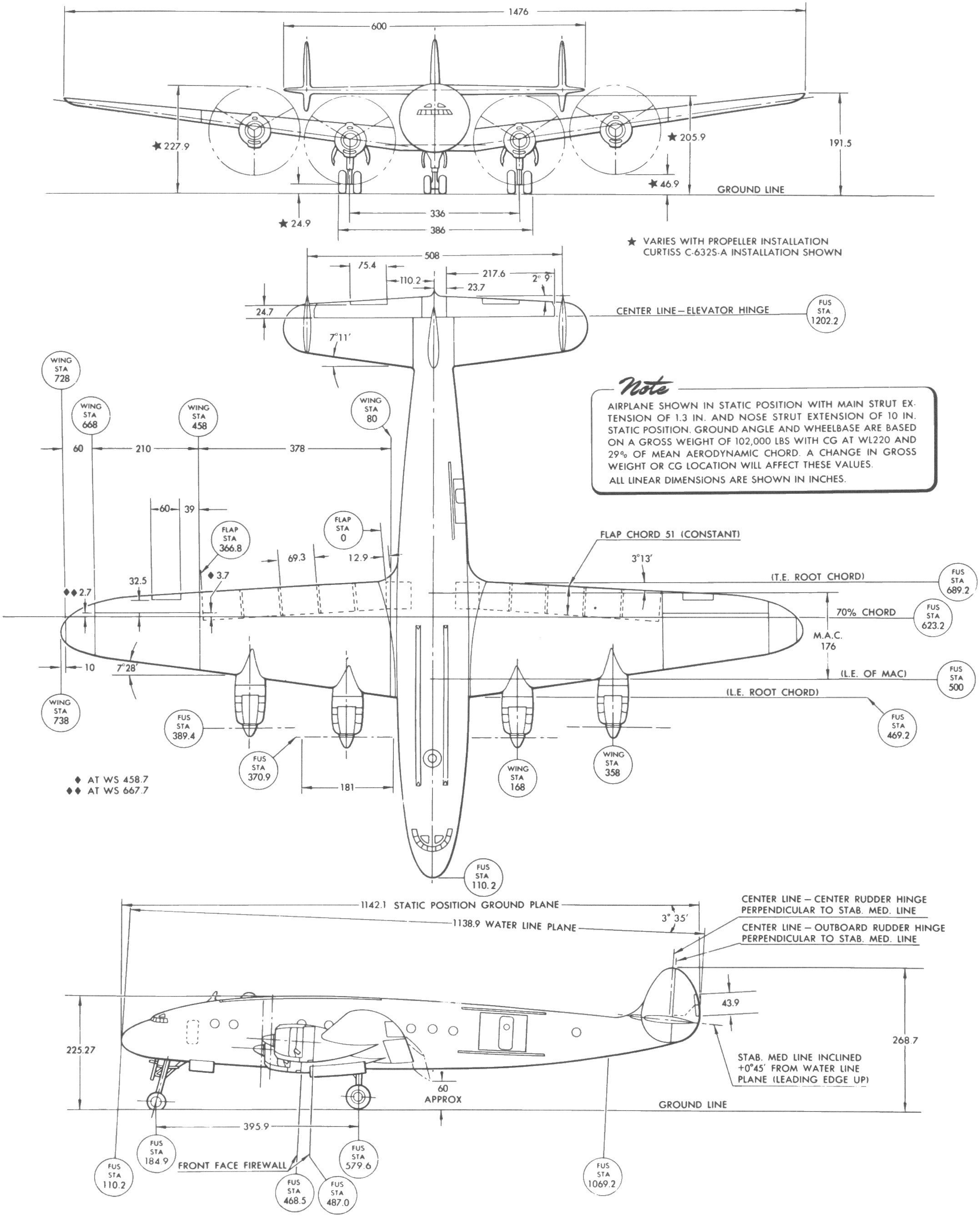
3-view line drawing of the Lockheed Model 649 Constellation

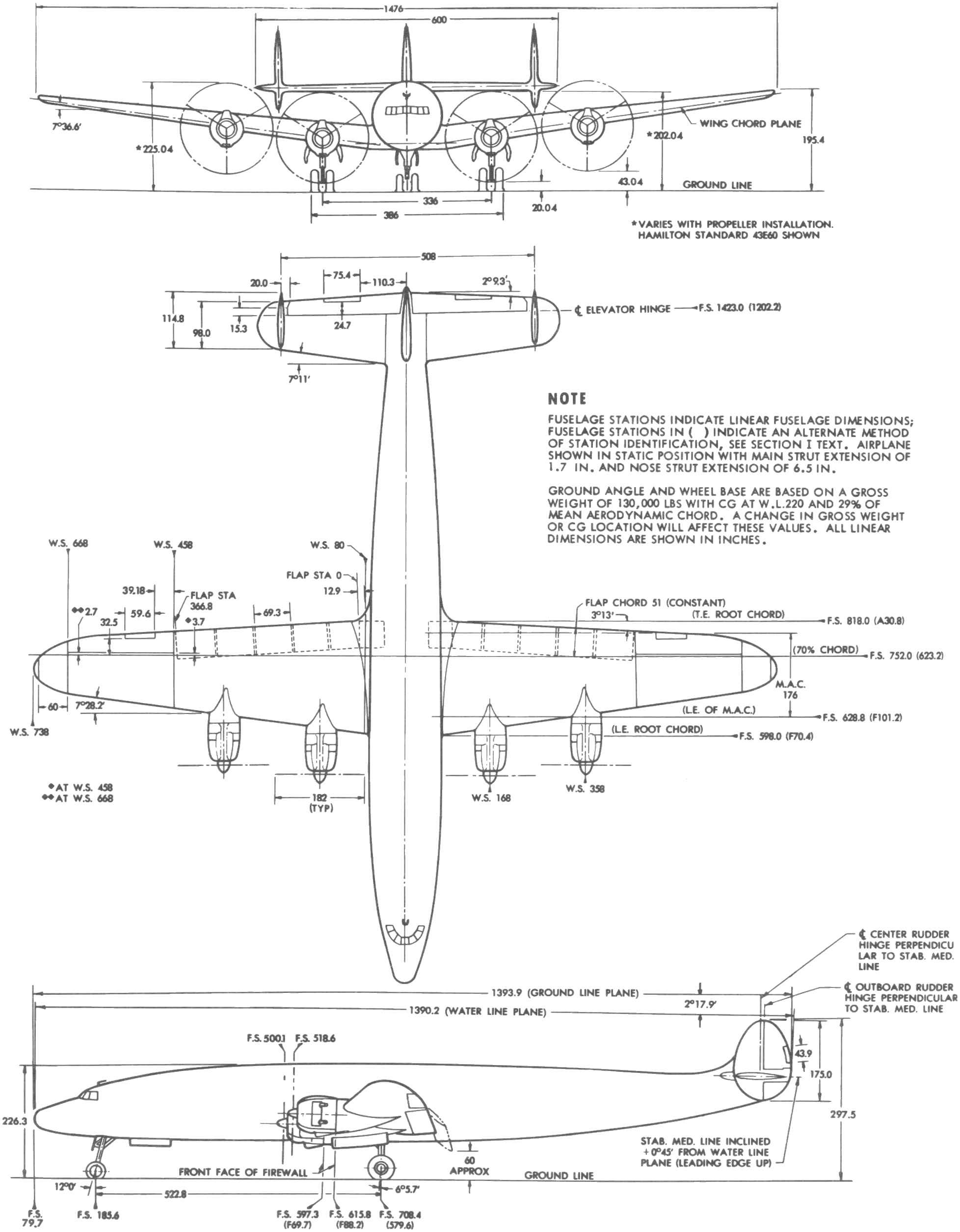
3-view line drawing of the Lockheed C-121C Constellation

Data from Lockheed Constellation:From Excalibur to Starliner, Lockheed Constellation:From Excalibur to Starliner

General characteristics

- Crew: 5
- Capacity: 44 Passengers (Passenger configuration)
- Length: 95 ft 2 in (29.01 m)
- Wingspan: 123 ft (37 m)
- Height: 22 ft 5 in (6.83 m)
- Wing area: 1,650 sq ft (153 m^{2})
- Airfoil: root: NACA 23018; tip: NACA 4412
- Empty weight: 61,235 lb (27,776 kg)
- Max takeoff weight: 107,000 lb (48,534 kg)
- Powerplant: 4 × Wright R-3350-75 Duplex-Cyclone 18-cylinder air-cooled radial piston engines, 2,500 hp (1,900 kW) each
- Propellers: 3-bladed constant-speed feathering propellers

Performance

- Maximum speed: 334 mph (538 km/h, 290 kn)
- Cruise speed: 324 mph (521 km/h, 282 kn)
- Service ceiling: 24,442 ft (7,450 m)

== See also ==
Related development

- Lockheed C-69 Constellation
- Lockheed Constellation
- Lockheed EC-121 Warning Star
- Lockheed L-049 Constellation
- Lockheed L-649 Constellation
- Lockheed L-749 Constellation
- Lockheed L-1049 Super Constellation
- Lockheed L-1249 Super Constellation (R7V-2/YC-121F)
- Lockheed L-1649 Starliner

Aircraft of comparable role, configuration, and era

- Boeing 377 Stratocruiser
- Boeing C-97 Stratofreighter
- Boeing KC-97 Stratofreighter
- Bristol Britannia
- Canadair CC-109 Cosmopolitan
- Convair C-131 Samaritan
- Douglas C-54 Skymaster
- Douglas DC-6/C-118 Liftmaster
- Douglas DC-7
- Ilyushin Il-18

Related lists

- List of Lockheed aircraft
- List of Lockheed Constellation operators
- Lockheed Constellation variants
