= Army One =

Air traffic control call sign

Richard Nixon boarding the helicopter in use as Army One upon his final departure from the White House. His resignation would become effective later that day.

Army One is the callsign of any United States Army aircraft carrying the president of the United States. An Army aircraft carrying the vice president is designated Army Two.

== History ==
From 1957 until 1976, the callsign was usually used for an Army helicopter transporting the president. Prior to 1976, responsibility for helicopter transportation of the president was divided between the Army and the U.S. Marine Corps, under the call sign Marine One, until the Marine Corps was given the sole responsibility of transporting the president by helicopter.

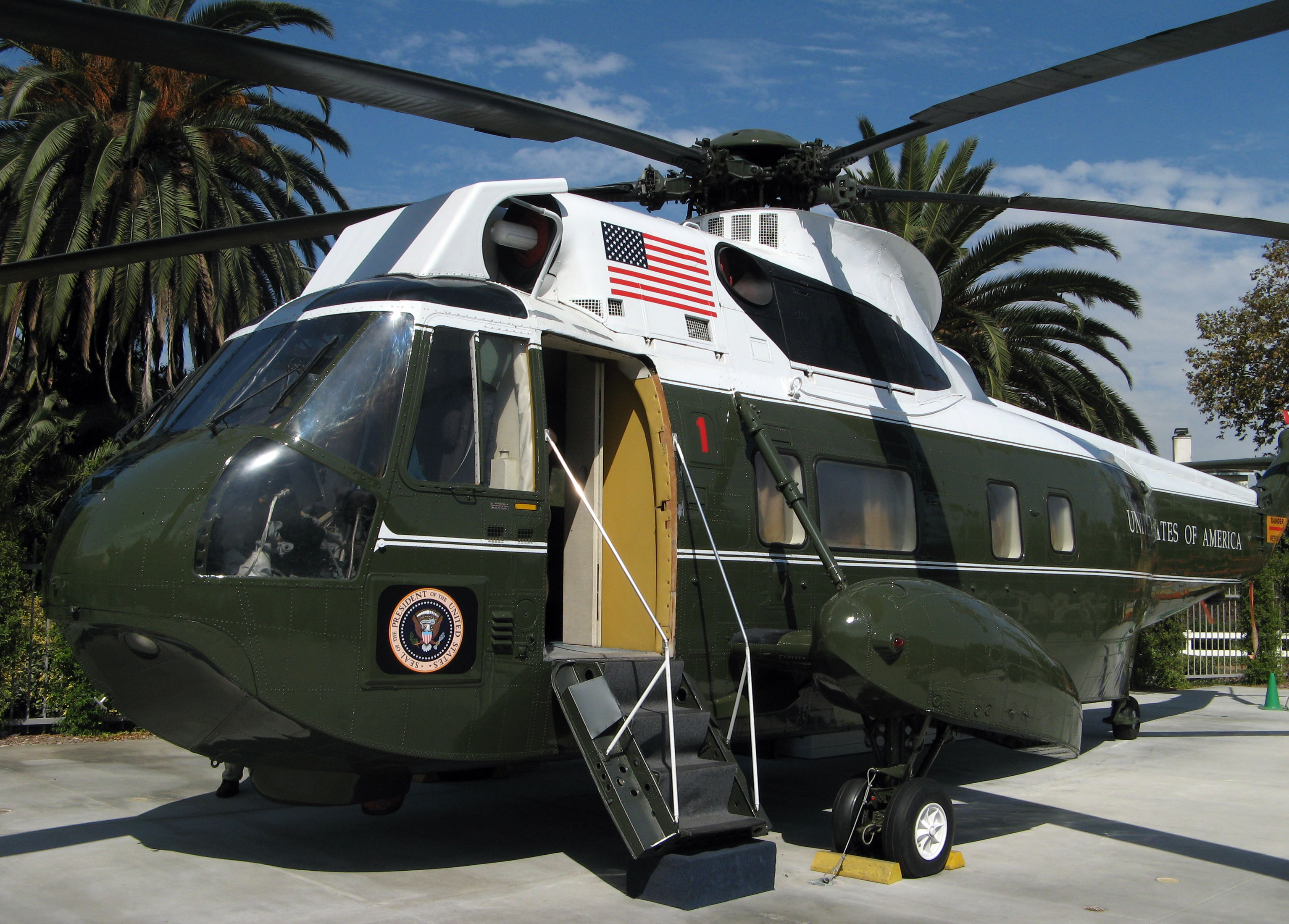
VH-3A tail number 150617, the same helicopter as in the above image, on display at the Nixon Library. It was in the presidential fleet from 1961 to 1976, and often flew as Army One.

The best known helicopters that used the Army One callsign were Sea King VH-3A helicopters which were part of the presidential fleet from 1961 to 1976. During their presidential service, the helicopters were known either as Army One or Marine One, depending on whether Army or Marine Corps pilots were operating the craft. The helicopters, with seats for sixteen, had a seat reserved for the president and the first lady, and single, smaller seats for the two Secret Service agents who always flew with the presidential party.

== See also ==
- Transportation of the president of the United States

== Sources ==
- "Order 7110.65R (Air Traffic Control)". Federal Aviation Administration. March 14, 2007. Archived from the original on October 12, 2009.
