= Coast Guard One =

Coast Guard aircraft carrying the president

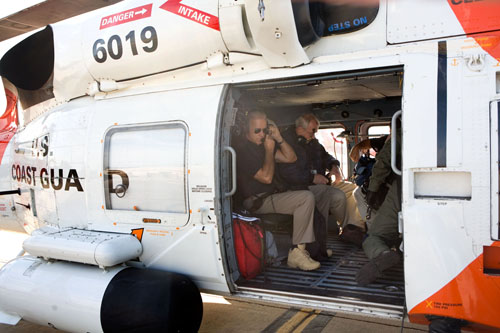
Then-Vice President Joe Biden on Coast Guard Two in 2009

Coast Guard One is the call sign of any United States Coast Guard aircraft carrying the president of the United States. Similarly, any Coast Guard aircraft carrying the vice president is designated Coast Guard Two.

As of 2026, there has never been a Coast Guard One flight. Coast Guard Two was activated on September 25, 2009, when then-Vice President Joe Biden took a flight on CG 6019, an HH-60 Jayhawk helicopter, over the recently flooded Atlanta area.

== Other executive travel ==
The Commandant of the Coast Guard often travels aboard a Gulfstream C-37 aircraft whose standard callsign is "Coast Guard Zero One". The aircraft is stationed at Coast Guard Air Station Washington at Ronald Reagan Washington National Airport.

== See also ==
- Transportation of the president of the United States
