= Boeing VC-25 =

US Air Force presidential transport aircraft

VC-25
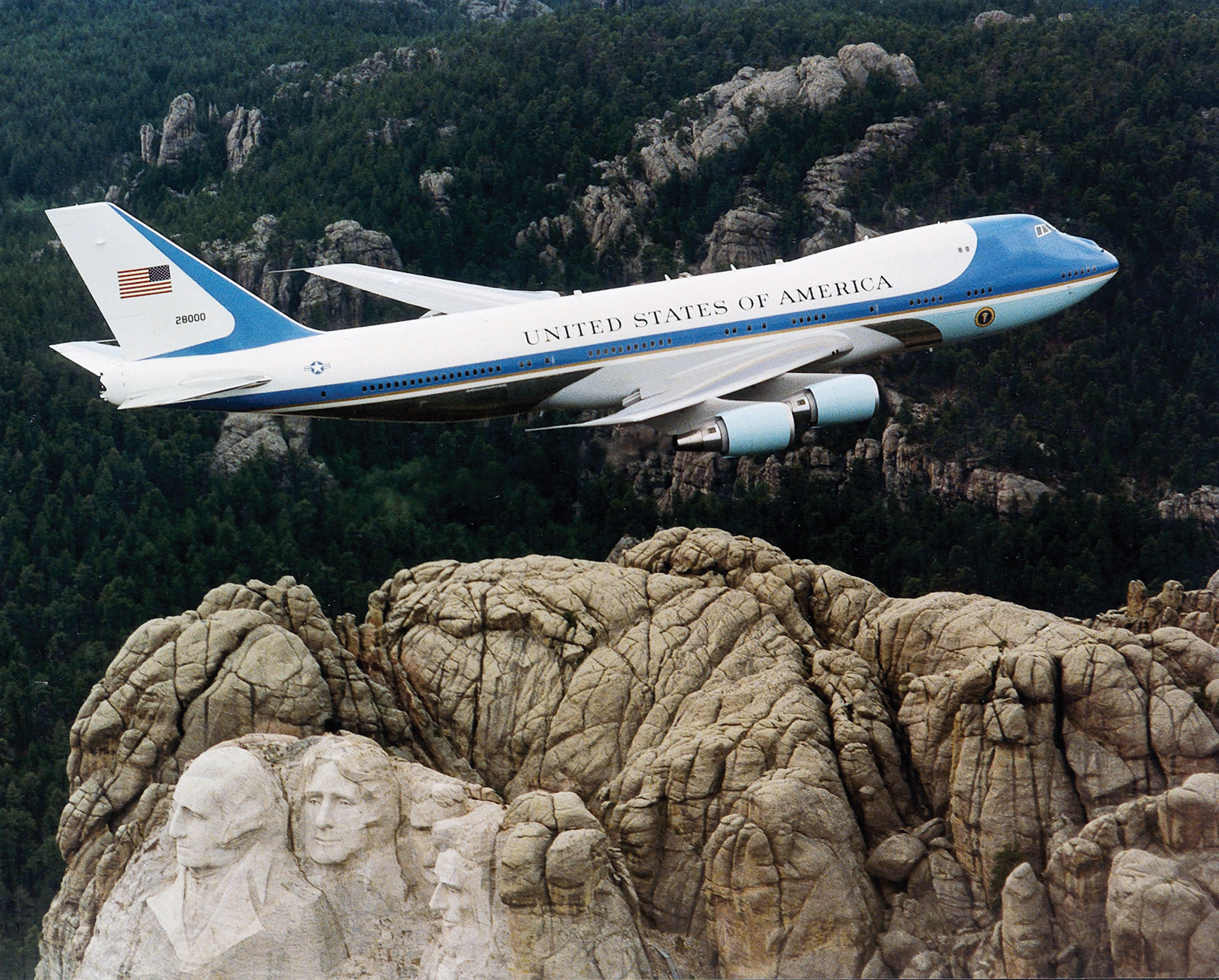
- VC-25A 28000 over Mount Rushmore in February 2001

General information
- Type: Presidential transport
- National origin: United States
- Manufacturer: Boeing
- Status: In service
- Primary user: United States Air Force
- Number built: 2 (VC-25A)

History
- Manufactured: 1986–1990; 2018–present
- Introduction date: 23 August 1990
- First flight: 16 May 1987
- Developed from: VC-25A: Boeing 747-200B; VC-25B: Boeing 747-8I
- Variant: Boeing VC-25B Bridge

The Boeing VC-25 is a military version of the Boeing 747 airliner, modified for presidential transport and commonly operated by the United States Air Force (USAF) as Air Force One, the call sign of any US Air Force aircraft carrying the president of the United States.

Only two examples of this aircraft type are in service; they are highly modified Boeing 747-200Bs, designated VC-25A and having tail numbers 28000 and 29000. Although technically the Air Force One designation applies to the aircraft only while the president is on board, the term is commonly used to refer to the VC-25 in general. The two aircraft often operate in conjunction with Marine One helicopters, which ferry the president to airports whenever a vehicle motorcade would be inappropriate.

Two new aircraft, based on the Boeing 747-8I and designated VC-25B, have been ordered by the USAF to replace the aging VC-25As. An additional 747-8I, designated VC-25B Bridge, has been modified to serve as an interim presidential transport pending delivery of the two VC-25Bs. Two more 747-8I aircraft were purchased from Lufthansa for pilot training and for spare parts for the VC-25B once they enter service.

== Development ==
By 1985, the pair of Boeing 707-based VC-137s used as the presidential aircraft had been in service for 23 and 13 years respectively, and the USAF began searching for an eventual replacement. The Request for Proposal issued stated that the aircraft to be selected should have at least three engines and an unrefueled range of at least 6,000 miles (9,700 km). Both Boeing with its 747 and McDonnell Douglas with the DC-10 were in competition to be selected, with the Boeing entry the eventual winner. The fabrication of the current 747s began during the presidency of Ronald Reagan (1981–1989).

The VC-25s were completed in 1986 and first flew in 1987. The interior designs were created by First Lady Nancy Reagan, who used designs reminiscent of the American Southwest. Problems with interior wiring for communication systems delayed delivery of the two aircraft until 1990, during the administration of George H. W. Bush.

The Air Force reported that the operating cost for each VC-25A in 2014 was $210,877 per hour (equivalent to approx. $282,000 in 2025).

== Design and configuration ==
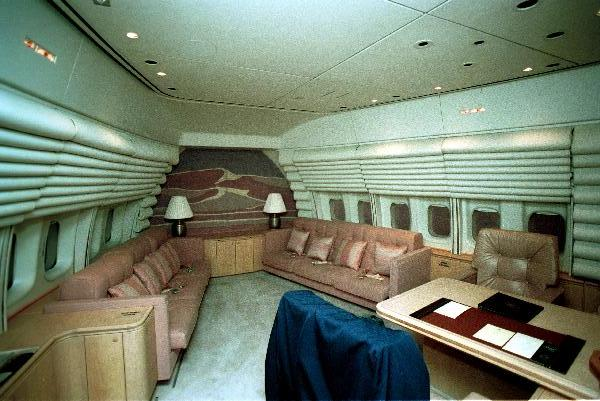
The first family's private quarters, in 1990. The couches can fold out into beds.

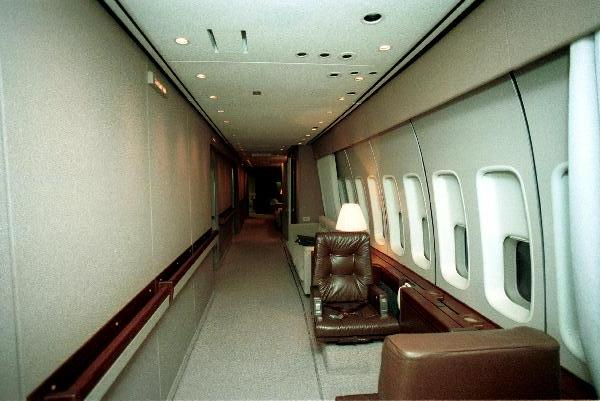
The aircraft's port-side (left) corridors, in 1990. The two chairs are typically occupied by Secret Service agents.

The VC-25 is capable of flying 7,800 miles (12,600 km)—roughly one-third the distance around the world—without refueling. The VC-25A can accommodate more than 70 passengers. Each VC-25A cost approximately $325 million. While the VC-25 has two main decks and a cargo area, like a regular Boeing 747, its 4,000 square feet (370 m^{2}) of floor space has been reconfigured for presidential duties. Its lowest level is mostly cargo space, carrying luggage and the onboard food supply. The main passenger area is on the second floor or main deck. The upper deck contains the cockpit and the communications center.

Typically, the president boards and disembarks from the front, main deck entrance using a mobile stairway, while journalists and other passengers enter at the rear door of the main deck. However, the aircraft also has built-in airstairs that lead to the lower deck, typically used when security concerns make the use of a mobile stairway impractical.

=== The "White House" ===
The front section of the aircraft is informally called the "White House", a reference to the president's official residence in Washington, D.C. The president's executive suite includes sleeping quarters with two couches that can be converted into beds, lavatory and shower, vanity, double sink, and a private office, or the president's "Oval Office aboard Air Force One". If necessary, the president can address the nation from the office. This capability was added after the September 11 attacks, during which the aircraft had to land at Barksdale Air Force Base for President George W. Bush to address the nation. These offices, including the president's suite, are mostly located on the starboard (right) side, and a long corridor runs along the port (left) side. The aircraft also contains a conference room, originally designed as a situation room, but now used for meeting with staff while traveling. This room includes a 50-inch plasma screen television which can be used for teleconferencing. The aircraft has fully equipped office areas with telecommunication systems (including 87 telephones and 19 televisions).

The VC-25 has a medical annex, which includes a fold-out operating table, emergency medical supplies, and a well-stocked pharmacy. George W. Bush had a treadmill added to Air Force One during his term in office. Every flight is staffed by a doctor and nurse. The aircraft is self-sufficient, such as carrying all the food it will need. Meals are prepared in two galleys, which together are equipped to feed up to 100 people at a time. The president gets a personal menu. An area where guests sit is near the center of the aircraft, outside the "White House".

There are separate quarters for guests, senior staff, Secret Service and Air Force security personnel assigned to the plane, and the news media located in the aft area of the main deck. Protocol states that one may wander aft of one's assigned seat, but not forward of it. Communications equipment and the cockpit are on the upper deck. There are also secure and non-secure voice, fax and data communications facilities. While the aircraft's luggage capacity is adequate to carry the belongings of the passengers, the logistics train of the president means that the aircraft must fly preceded by an aerial convoy of several cargo transports, which carry the helicopters, motorcade vehicles, and other equipment required by the presidential entourage.

== Operational history ==
=== VC-25A ===
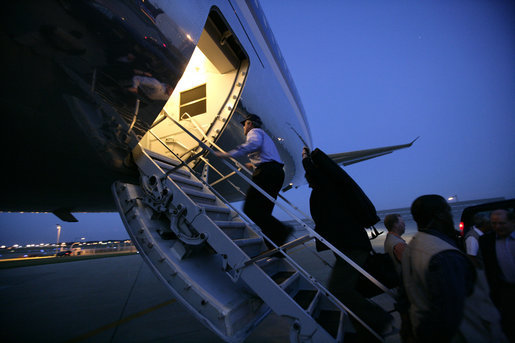
George W. Bush boards VC-25 via airstairs in 2006. These airstairs do not exist on regular 747 aircraft.

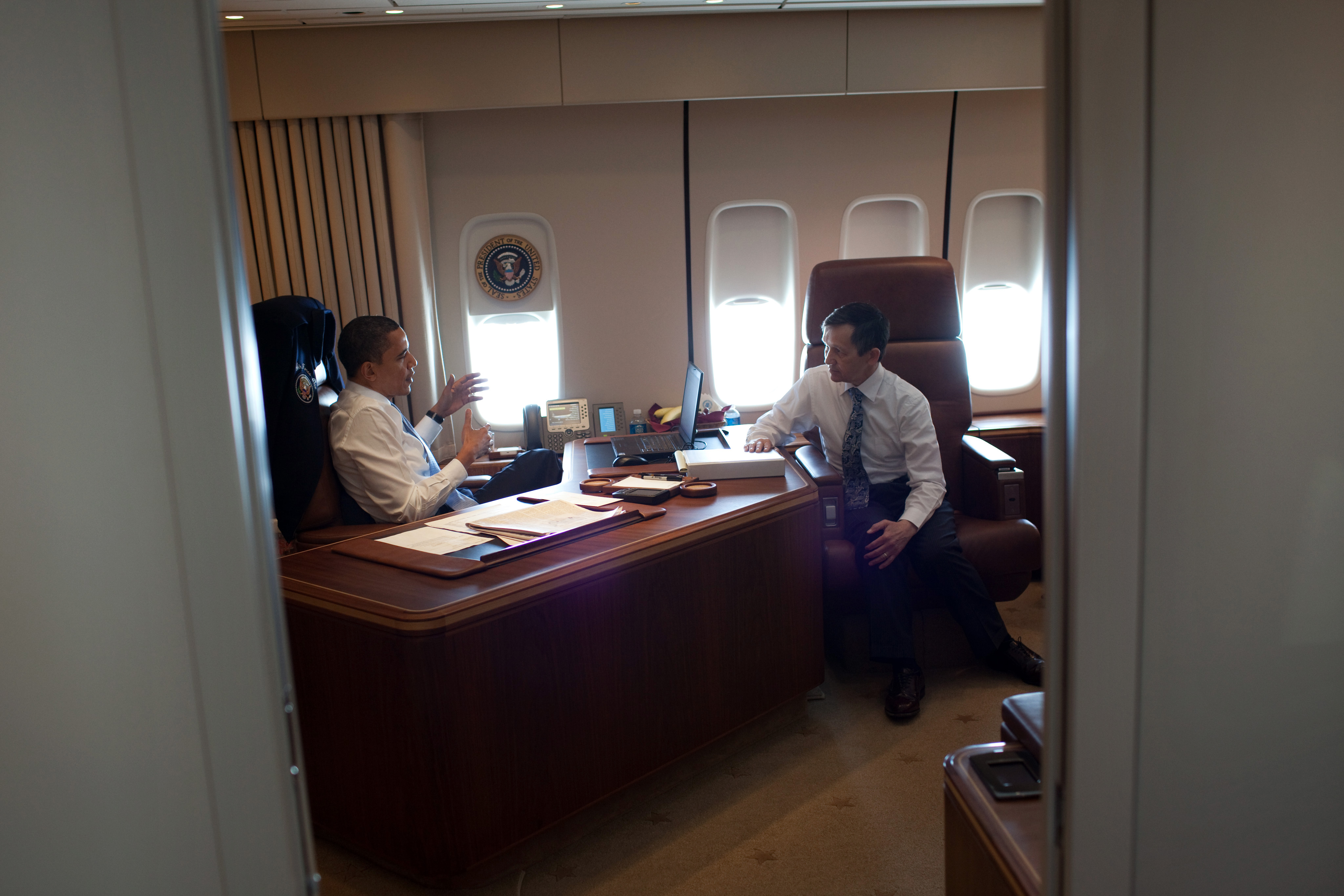
Barack Obama meets with Rep. Dennis Kucinich, D-Ohio, aboard Air Force One en route to Cleveland, Ohio, March 2010.

The VC-25A replaced the VC-137C (a military version of the Boeing 707) as the mainstay of the Air Force One fleet starting in 1987. On some occasions, the VC-25s serve as transport for the US vice president, for which service they use the Air Force Two call sign. The VC-25A aircraft are maintained and operated as military operations by the Presidential Airlift Group, part of Air Mobility Command's 89th Airlift Wing, based at Joint Base Andrews in Camp Springs, Maryland.

The aircraft can also be operated as a military command center in the event of an incident such as a nuclear attack. Operational modifications include aerial refueling capability and countermeasures against anti-aircraft missiles. The electronics on board are connected with approximately 238 miles (383 km) of wiring, twice that of a regular 747. All wiring is covered with heavy shielding for protection from a nuclear electromagnetic pulse in the event of a nuclear attack. The aircraft also has electronic countermeasures (ECMs) (AN/ALQ-204 Matador) to jam enemy radar, flares to spoof heat-seeking missiles, and chaff to spoof radar-guided missiles. All small arms and ammunition stores not in the physical possession of the Secret Service and Air Force security personnel on board the VC-25s are stowed and secured in separate locked compartments, each with a different locking mechanism for added security. Many of the VC-25's other capabilities are classified for security reasons.

There has been at least one instance of a VC-25A carrying the president of the United States without using the Air Force One call sign, when President George W. Bush went on a secret flight (with the "Gulf Stream Five" call sign) to meet with troops in Iraq on Thanksgiving, on 27 November 2003.

After a presidential inauguration resulting in a change in office, the outgoing president is provided transport on a VC-25 aircraft to their home destination. The aircraft for this flight does not use the Air Force One call sign because it is not carrying the president in office. For both Presidents Bill Clinton and George W. Bush, the flight was known as Special Air Mission 28000, where the number represents the aircraft's tail number.

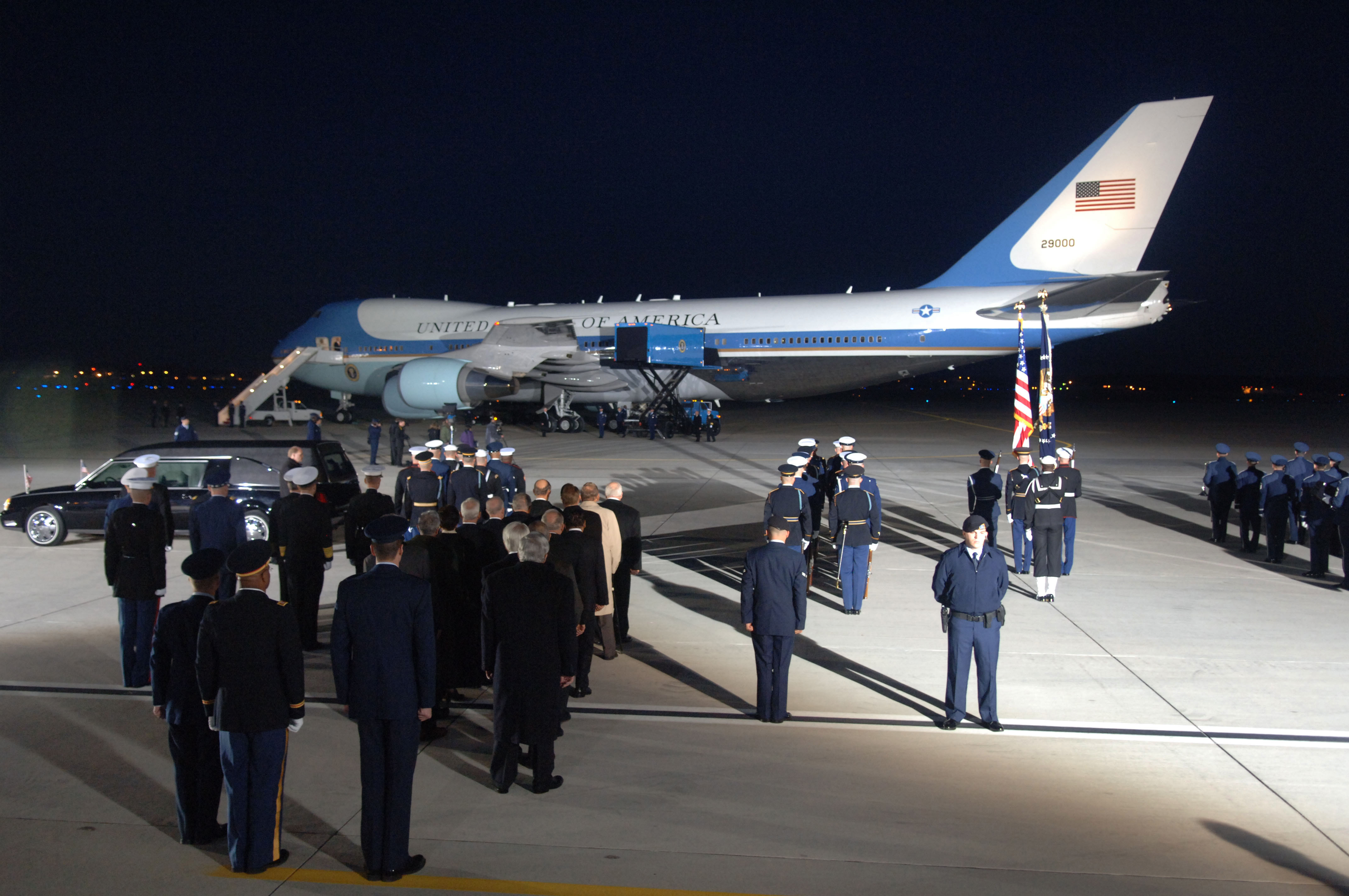
The casket of President Gerald Ford being lowered from the cabin of SAM 29000 at Andrews Air Force Base, Maryland, 2006.

The VC-25As have also been used to transport deceased former presidents, as the guest area aft of "the White House" has chairs and tables that can be removed and the casket laid in their place. The bodies of Ronald Reagan, Gerald Ford, George H.W. Bush, and Jimmy Carter were transported to Washington for their state funerals, and then on to their final resting places. Colonel Mark Tillman, pilot for President George W. Bush, said, "We'll take care of the president from basically when he's in office to when he lays in state." For the funeral of President Ronald Reagan in 2004, Tillman said that the crew converted the front of the aircraft to look the way it would have appeared when Reagan was president; President and Nancy Reagan's Air Force One jackets were placed on the chairs to "make them feel at home". A specially designed hydraulic lifter (similar to the type used by airline catering) with the presidential seal affixed to the sides lifts the casket up to the portside aft door to enter the VC-25A. The tradition of placing the caskets in the passenger cabin dates back to the assassination of John F. Kennedy, when the crew did not want the president's body placed in the cargo hold, and again during the state funeral of Lyndon B. Johnson.

According to an April 2024 report, the two VC-25As are slated for retirement in fiscal year 2028 and 2029, respectively. The VC-25As will be placed in museums after retirement; in 2019, the George H.W. Bush Presidential Library and Museum requested one of the aircraft for permanent display.

=== VC-25B ===
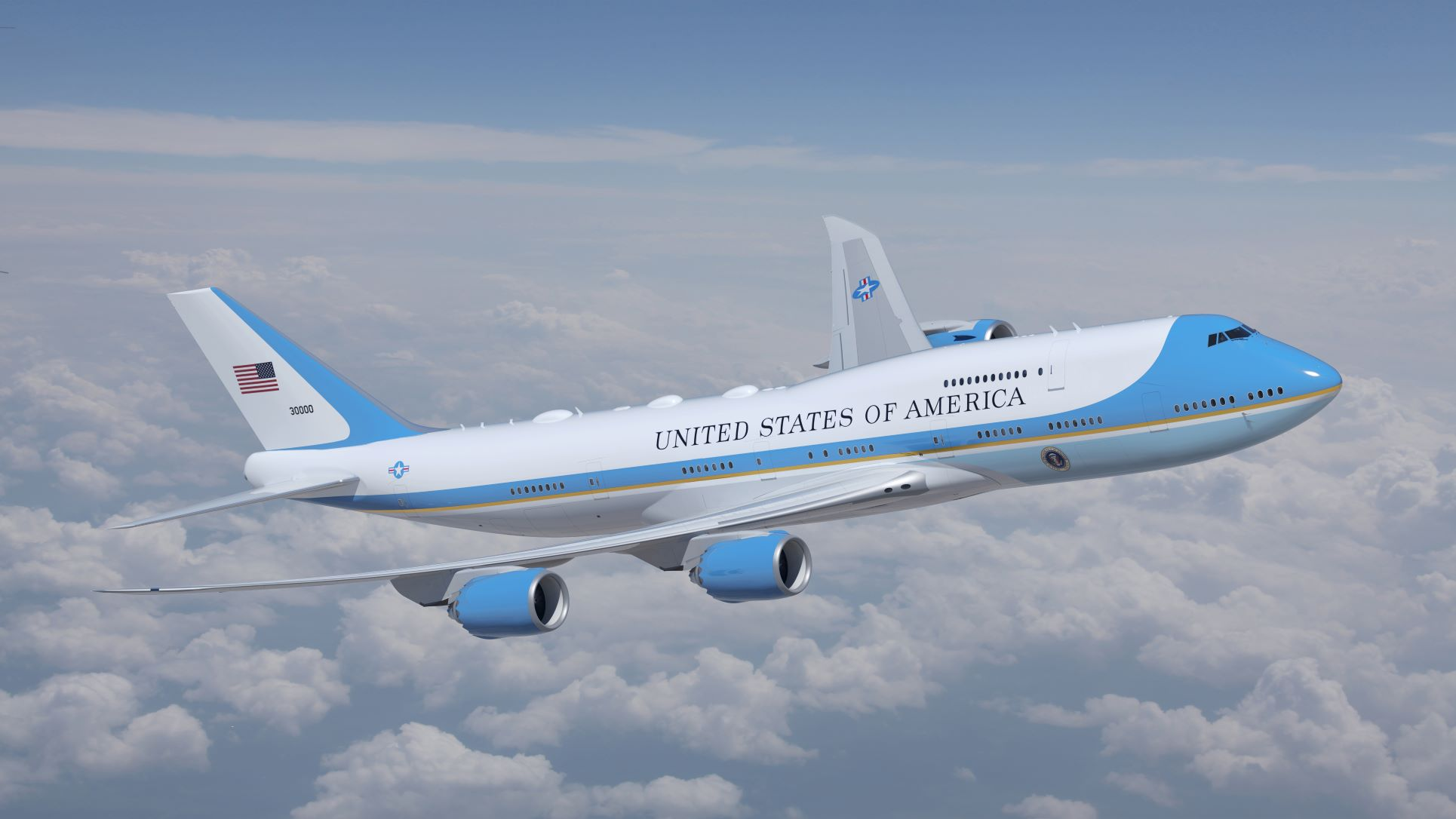
Illustration of the VC-25B color scheme announced March 2023

The VC-25A aircraft are aging and have become less cost-effective to operate. The USAF Air Mobility Command investigated possible replacements, with early press coverage suggesting that the USAF would consider the Boeing 747-8 and the Airbus A380. On 7 January 2009, Air Force Materiel Command issued a new Sources Sought notice for a replacement aircraft to enter service by 2017 with an additional two aircraft to follow in 2019 and 2021. On 28 January 2009, EADS North America representing EADS and its Airbus division confirmed it would not respond to the US Air Force notice, as assembling only three airplanes in the US would not make financial sense. This made Boeing the only aircraft manufacturer interested in supplying the replacement aircraft, and was reported to be exploring a 787 option also. On 28 January 2015, the Air Force announced the selection of the Boeing 747-8 to replace the aging VC-25A for presidential transport.

On 10 May 2016, the Air Force posted online an amendment to its Air Force One contract authorizing Boeing to begin preliminary design activities. This version of the contract synopsis confirmed that the government will buy two modified 747-8 aircraft. Boeing was awarded a contract in January 2016 to identify cost reduction opportunities in areas including maintenance, aerial refueling and communications. On 15 July 2016, Boeing received another contract for pre-engineering and manufacturing development (EMD) risk-reduction to address "system specification, the environmental control system, the aircraft interior, the electrical and power system and sustainment and maintenance approaches" to reduce development risks and life-cycle costs.

On 1 August 2017, Defense One reported that in an effort to pay less for the replacement program, the USAF entered into a contract to purchase two 747-8 Intercontinental (747-8I) jets from Boeing, which had originally been ordered in 2011 by Transaero, a Russian airline. Before they could be delivered, Transaero filed for bankruptcy and was closed down; the two aircraft were stored at Southern California Logistics Airport in the Mojave Desert to prevent corrosion. On 27 February 2018, the White House announced a US$3.9 billion (~$4.92 billion in 2025) agreement with Boeing to modify the two unsold 747-8s to replace the VC-25As. The new aircraft is to be designated VC-25B. These aircraft are to be retrofitted with telecommunications and security equipment to bring them to the required security level for the presidential aircraft. In April 2022, Boeing's CEO Dave Calhoun revealed that he expects the company to have a loss of $660 million on the VC-25B program, after the contract was renegotiated by President Trump.

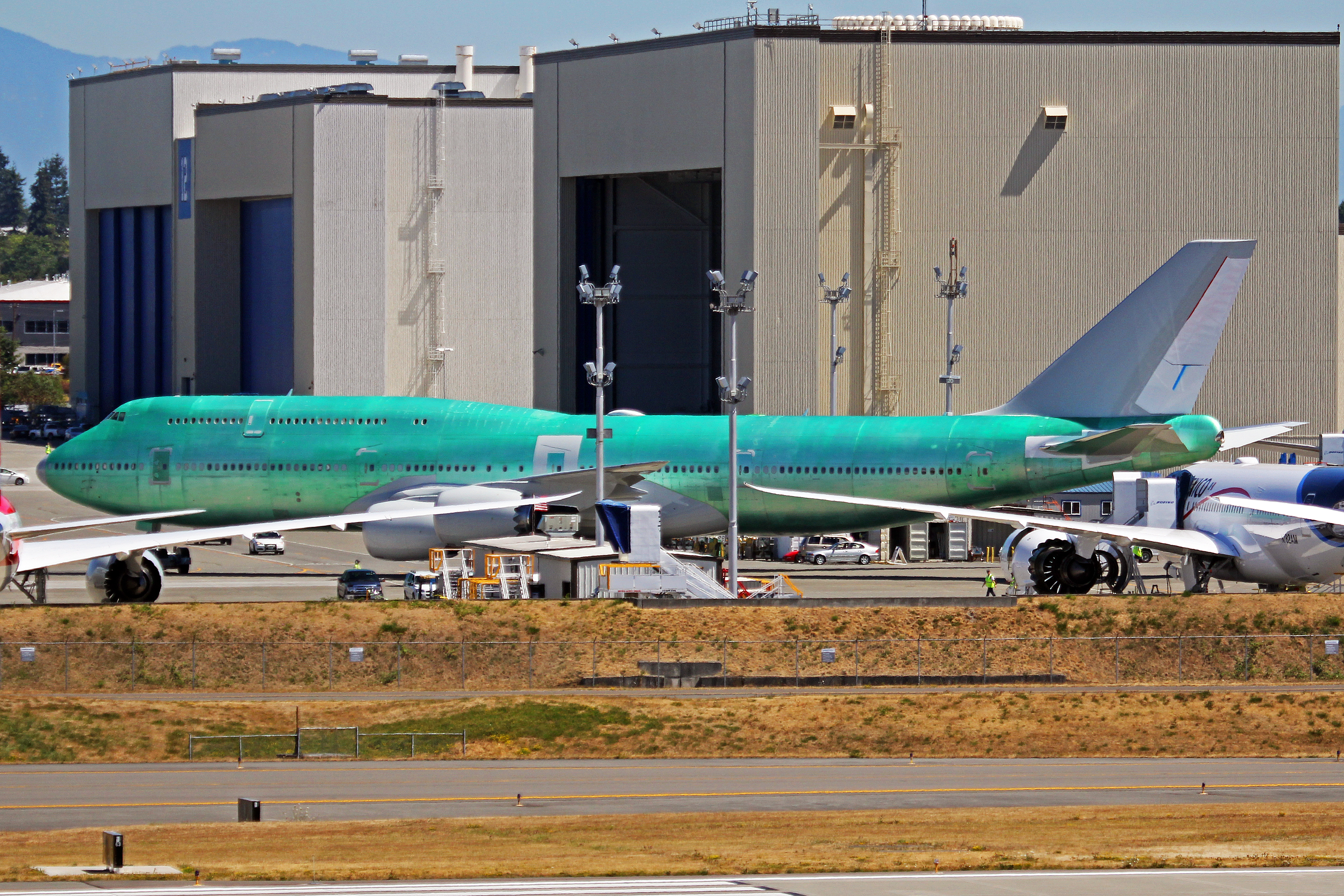
One of the two 747-8I aircraft that will be converted into the VC-25B, seen in July 2015 shortly after construction.

In June 2019, President Trump announced his plans to revamp the VC-25's livery from the traditional Robin egg blue (called "luminous ultramarine") white and silver shades to one of red, white, and blue. This would have been the first deviation from the Raymond Loewy livery scheme since it was introduced in 1962 on the VC-137C which was first used as Air Force One during the Kennedy administration. The Biden administration abandoned the new design, citing "additional engineering, as well as increased time and cost." A modified version of the traditional scheme was announced in March 2023. The second Trump administration announced a new scheme in February 2026, which is much like the livery proposed during the first Trump administration. The Air Force later announced the "Air Power One" livery will be applied to the government fleet of VC-25Bs and C-32s.

The 747s began undergoing modification work at Boeing's San Antonio facility in 2020. According to The Wall Street Journal, the development process has been hit by multiple "production mishaps", including the discovery of empty tequila mini-bottles on one of the aircraft, and the use of jacks that were not rated to support the weight of the aircraft. While the jacking did not result in damage to the planes, "the Pentagon's contractor-management agency formally requested Boeing improve its operations."

Boeing's VC-25B program faced surging costs due to supplier issues, technical challenges and labor shortages, including finding enough workers with security clearances to work on the aircraft. The Air Force flagged security lapses at Boeing's San Antonio site. Boeing faced engineering problems of structural stringer cracks on the 747-8 airframes. Boeing intended to ask for more than $500 million to cover issues related to a key supplier's bankruptcy and delays related to the Covid-19 pandemic.

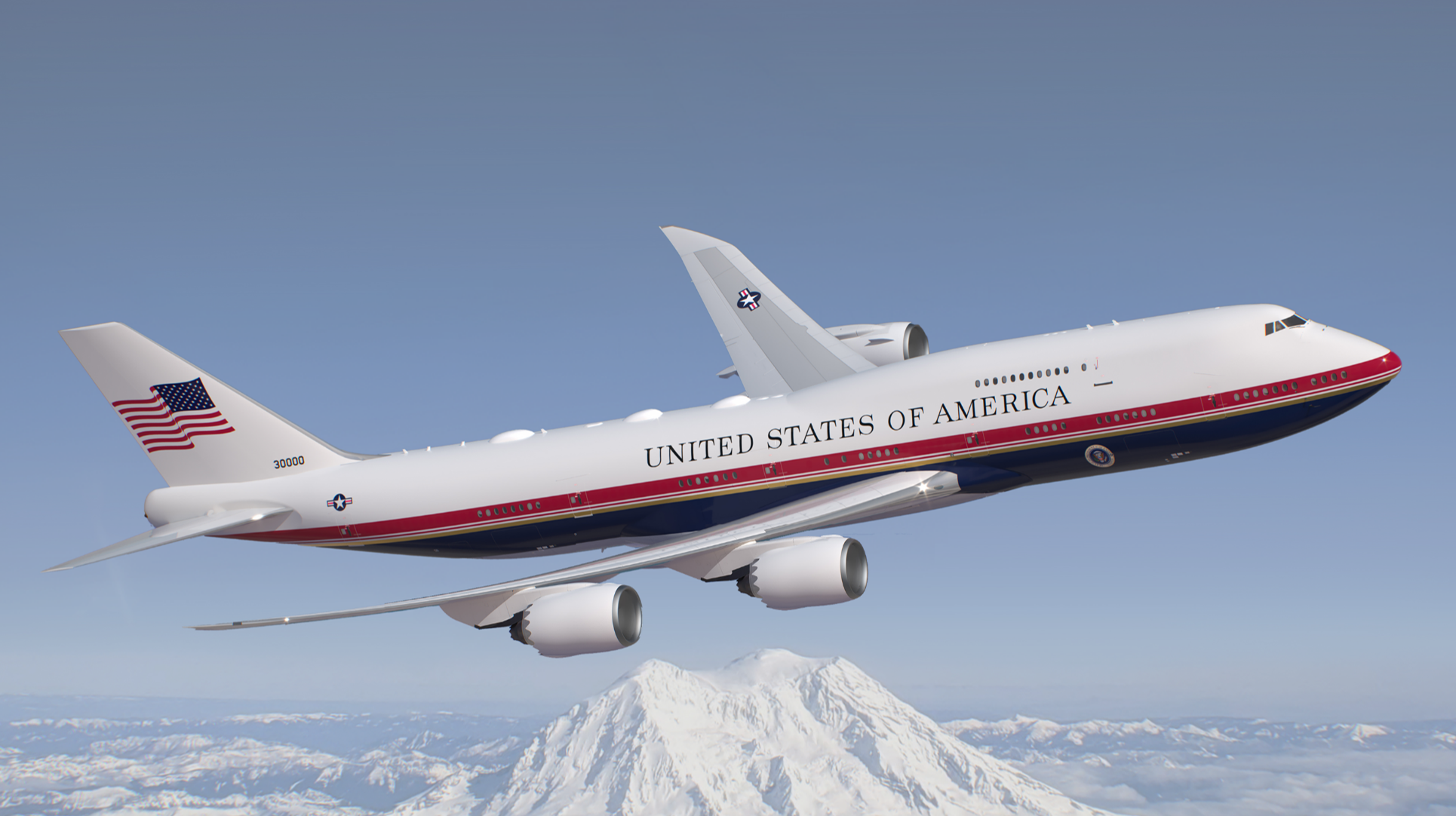
The livery color scheme, announced February 2026, applies to the Boeing VC-25B Bridge and Air Power One fleet.

While the initial delivery date was set to 2024, the Pentagon expects the jets to be two to three years late, with the Air Force projecting delivery of the first VC-25B in 2027, and the other in 2028, as of a 2023 press release. By 2025 the delivery date had slipped to 2029 and the Air Force was considering changes to the requirements to bring the delivery date back to 2027.

In December 2025, the Air Force purchased a pair of 747-8I aircraft from Lufthansa for $400 million to be used for pilot training and spare parts for the VC-25Bs once they enter service.

As the 747-8 fleet has issues with stringer cracks on the airframe, there are 95 repairs remaining for the first aircraft and 142 remaining for the second as of April 2026, according to a report by the Pentagon.

== Variants ==
VC-25A
Based on the Boeing 747-200B
VC-25B Bridge
Interim modification of a former Qatar Amiri Flight Boeing 747-8I Boeing Business Jet (registered N7478D) by L3Harris. The VC-25B Bridge is intended to complement the two VC-25As until their VC-25B replacements are delivered. Modifications and flight testing were completed by May 2026. The aircraft made its inaugural flight as Air Force One on 1 July 2026.
VC-25B
Based on the Boeing 747-8 Intercontinental

== Operators ==
United States

- United States Air Force
  - 89th Airlift Wing, Presidential Airlift Group (PAG) – Andrews AFB, Maryland

== Specifications (VC-25A) ==
Boeing VC-25 Air Force One video

Data from Boeing BDS

General characteristics

- Crew: 26: flight crew (pilot, co-pilot, flight engineer, navigator), cabin crew, communications, maintenance, and security
- Capacity: 76 passengers
- Length: 231 ft 10 in (70.66 m)
- Wingspan: 196 ft 8 in (59.94 m)
- Height: 63 ft 5 in (19.33 m)
- Max takeoff weight: 833,000 lb (377,842 kg)
- Powerplant: 4 × General Electric CF6-80C2B1 turbofan engines, 56,700 lbf (252 kN) thrust each

Performance

- Maximum speed: 547.5 kn (630.1 mph, 1,014.0 km/h) at 35,000 ft (10,668 m)
- Maximum speed: Mach 0.92
- Cruise speed: 500 kn (580 mph, 930 km/h) / M0.84 at 35,000 ft (10,668 m)
- Range: 6,800 nmi (7,800 mi, 12,600 km)
- Service ceiling: 45,100 ft (13,700 m)

== Notable appearances in media ==
The VC-25 "Air Force One" is a prominent symbol of the US presidency and its powers; with the White House and presidential seal, it is among the most recognized presidential symbols. Air Force One has often appeared in popular culture and fiction, including the setting of the 1997 action movie Air Force One where the aircraft had an escape pod and a parachute ramp, unlike the actual presidential aircraft.

== See also ==
- Air Force One photo op incident
- Air Force Two
- Air transports of heads of state and government

Related development

- Boeing 747
- Boeing E-4B Nightwatch

Aircraft of comparable role, configuration, and era

- VC-137C SAM 26000
- VC-137C SAM 27000
- Boeing C-32
- Boeing C-40 Clipper
- Royal Air Force Voyager Vespina
