= Boeing VC-25B Bridge =

Modified Boeing 747-8 VIP transport

VC-25B Bridge
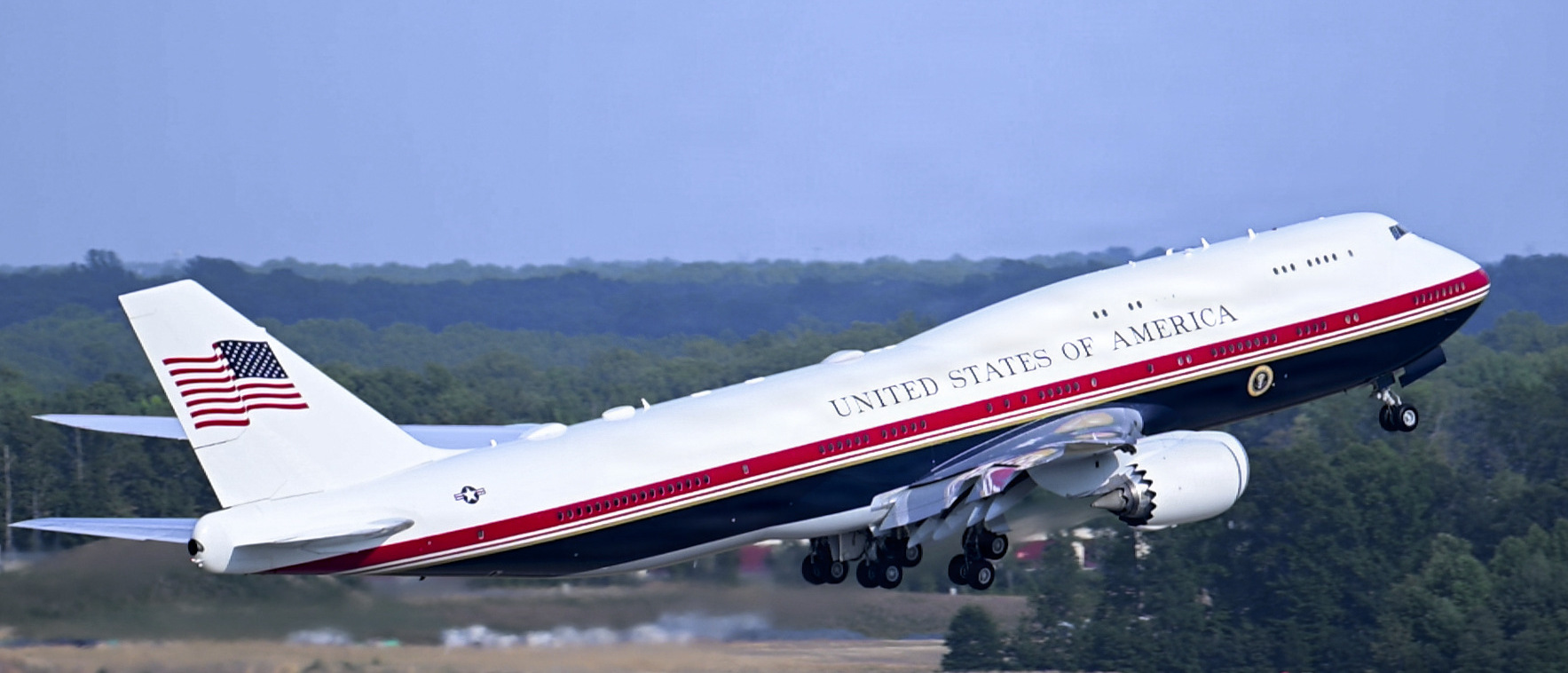
- VC-25B Bridge taking off for the United States Semiquincentennial flyover of Washington DC on 4 July 2026

General information
- Type: Presidential transport
- National origin: United States
- Manufacturer: Boeing; L3Harris (modifications)
- Status: In service
- Primary user: United States Air Force (Note: The aircraft previously served with Qatar Amiri Flight prior to conversion.)
- Number built: 1
- Registration: N7478D (Note: Prior to conversion, the aircraft had also carried the registrations A7-HJA, A7-HBJ, and P4-HBJ.)
- Serial: 25-3300

History
- Introduction date: 1 July 2026
- First flight: 2026
- In service: 2026–present (Note: The aircraft was in service from 2012–2025 prior to conversion.)
- Developed from: Boeing VC-25; Boeing 747-8I

The Boeing VC-25B Bridge is a military conversion of a single Boeing 747-8 airliner, serving as an interim Air Force One presidential transport to complement the United States Air Force's aging VC-25A fleet. Originally built as a Boeing Business Jet, the aircraft was delivered to Qatar Amiri Flight in April 2012 and used by the House of Thani. In June 2023, it was delivered to Global Jet Isle of Man. The U.S. federal government acquired the plane as a gift from the Qatari government in 2025 and it underwent modifications by L3Harris for its new role. U.S. president Donald Trump uses the aircraft alongside the existing VC-25As. As a stopgap for the two direct replacement VC-25Bs that are still in development, the VC-25B Bridge lacks several features of the definitive aircraft, including defensive countermeasures. The aircraft is slated to be transferred to Trump's presidential library foundation shortly before the end of his second term, though critics argue that such a transfer may be unconstitutional.

== Design and development ==
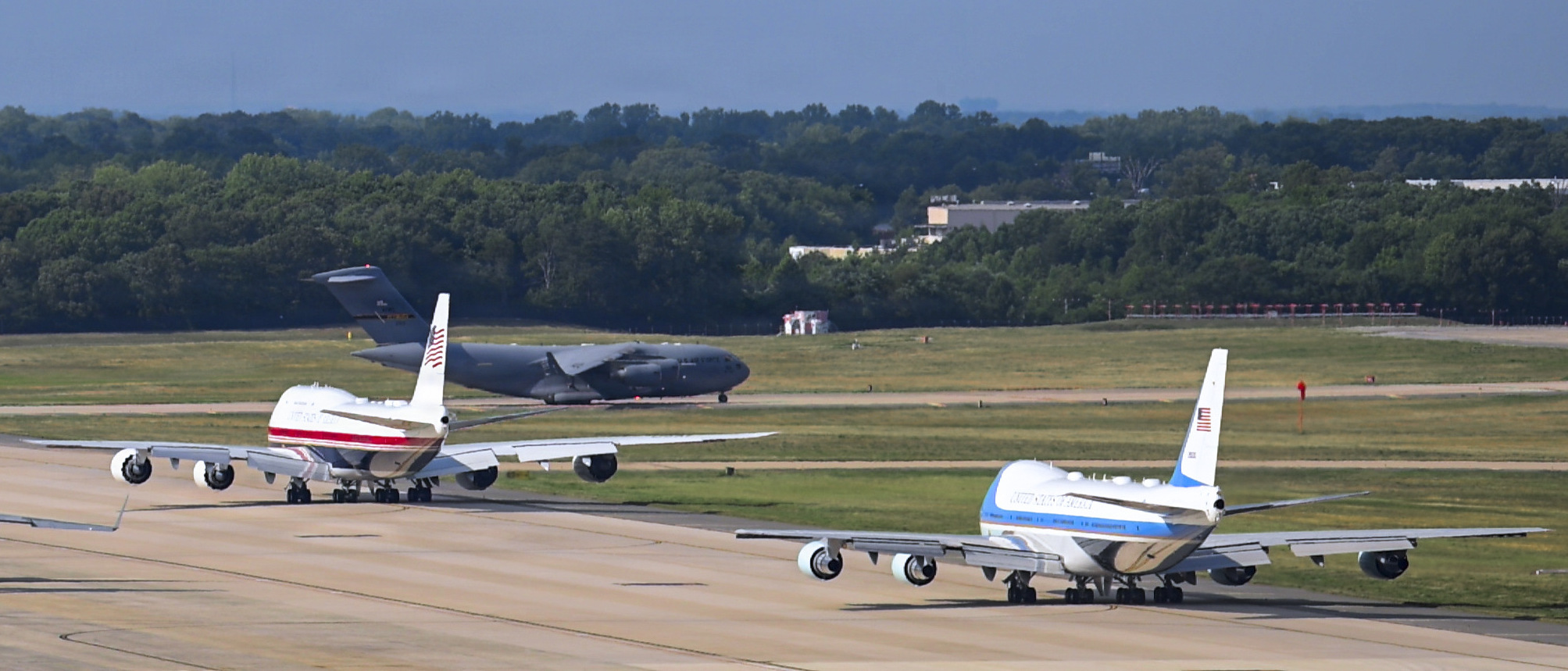
VC-25B Bridge (left) taxiing with a VC-25A (right) at Joint Base Andrews

The aircraft that would later become the VC-25B Bridge was originally built as a Boeing Business Jet variant 747-8KB. (Note: The "KB" suffix is the Boeing customer code for Qatar Amiri Flight.) The aircraft interior was designed by Cabinet Alberto Pinto, featuring rugs from Tai Ping Carpets, sycamore and wacapou fixtures, and artwork from Alexander Calder. The plane included two bathrooms, nine lavatories, a main and guest bedroom, and several lounges. There was an office, "business class" seating, multiple galleys, and crew rest facilities. It had audio-visual equipment as well as satellite connectivity. The aircraft seated 89 people. Its replacement value was generally estimated at US$400 million, although Bloomberg reported that its market value was likely lower, about US$100–125 million.

After acquisition by the United States Air Force, L3Harris was selected to perform the necessary modifications for use as a presidential transport. Modifications are expected to include special communications equipment appropriate for a military senior leader. According to Politico, modifying the aircraft for Air Force One would cost tens to hundreds of millions of dollars, including auditing the plane for foreign technology.

=== Security concerns ===
When an aircraft is converted into Air Force One, it is typically fitted with hardened defenses, encrypted communications, and countermeasures. These allow the president to survive a war or other major catastrophe and to command forces while airborne. The White House states that the current feature set is adequate to ensure the security of its passengers. However, the new plane lacks certain security features, such as advanced antimissile capabilities, an emergency lower-level exit and backup power system, present in the existing VC-25As. The Air Force has stated that the aircraft lacks some "less commonly used mission sets" required in the future. Frank Kendall, the former Air Force secretary who oversaw the acceleration of the VC-25B program, stated that the VC-25B Bridge lacks "some mix of security, communications and support" and was surprised to see the plane fly overseas. These security concerns forced President Trump to use a VC-25A to return from the July 2026 NATO summit in Ankara. According to Kendall, upgrading the VC-25B Bridge to the same security standards as the VC-25A would have taken three to four years.

== Operational history ==
=== Qatar Amiri Flight (2012–2023) ===
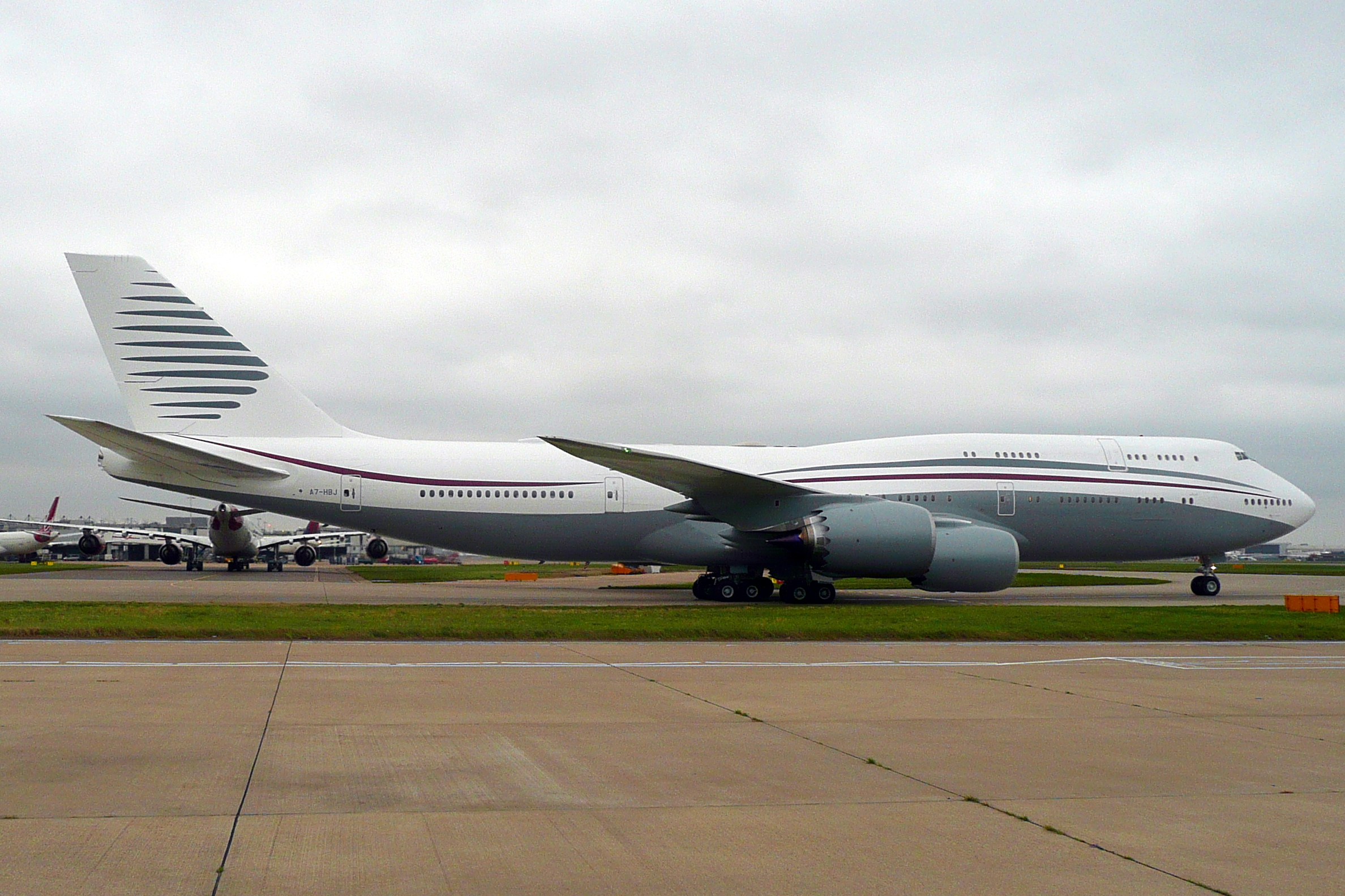
The aircraft as A7-HBJ in 2015

In April 2012, Boeing delivered the aircraft, registered "A7-HJA" at the time, to Qatar Amiri Flight from Everett, Washington. The aircraft was used by the House of Thani for flights to the United States and Europe and was owned by Hamad bin Jassim bin Jaber Al Thani, the former prime minister of Qatar.

=== Global Jet Isle of Man (2023–2025) ===
In June 2023, the aircraft was delivered to Global Jet Isle of Man. The new owner of the plane was undisclosed; The New York Times reported in 2025 that it was privately owned and not used for air charters.

=== United States Air Force (2025–present) ===
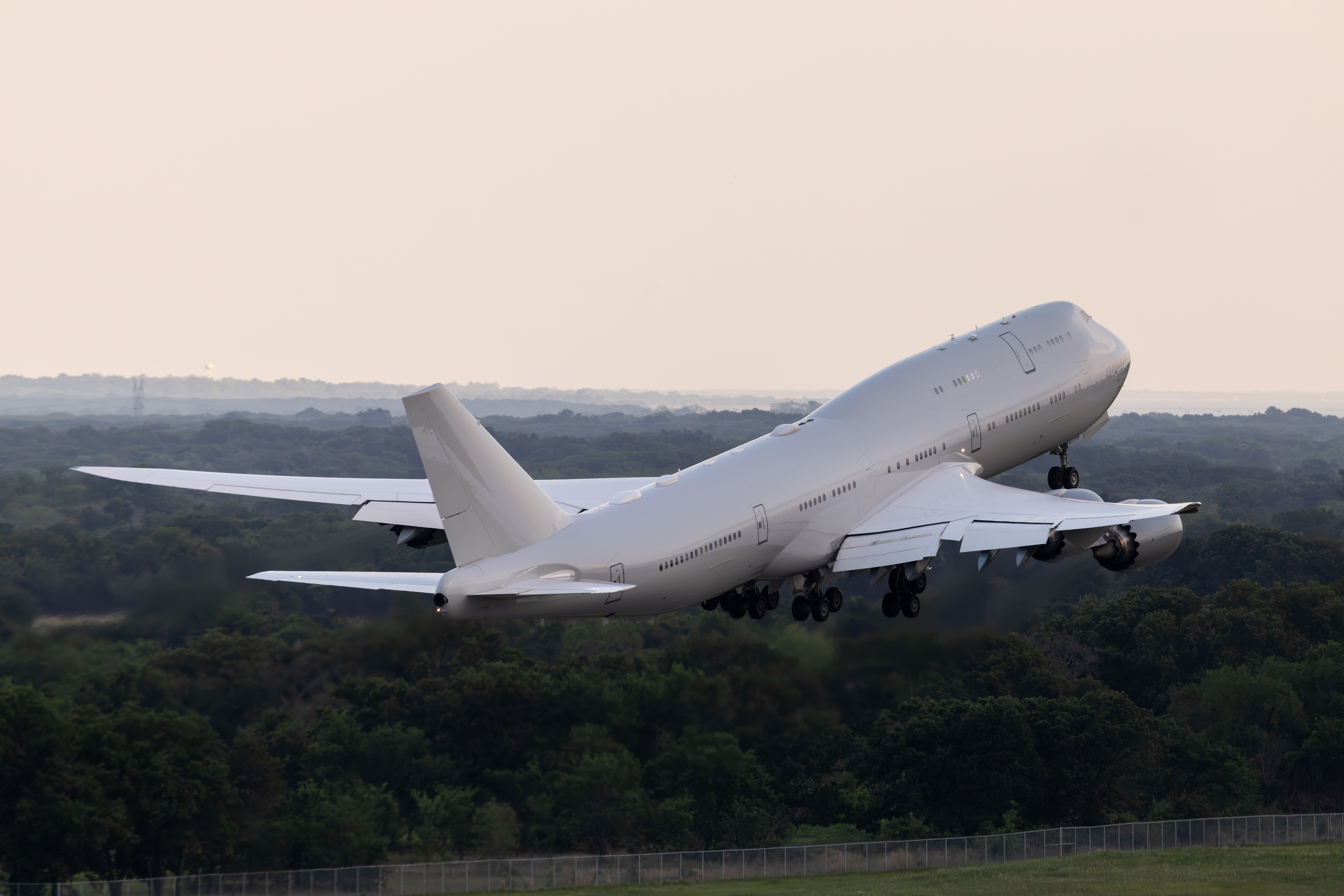
The aircraft, after conversion to VC-25B Bridge standard, during flight testing in April 2026.

After U.S. president Donald Trump was inaugurated in January 2025, he moved to direct Elon Musk to force Boeing to quickly manufacture replacements for the aging VC-25 series that was being used by the president for 35 years as Air Force One. In February, after special envoy Steven Witkoff arranged for Qatar to send the plane to the US for Trump to see; he toured the 747 at Palm Beach International Airport; and the plane returned to Doha, Qatar. At this point Qatar officials were reported as expecting the plane to be sold or leased to the US, not gifted. Sometime before mid February, people close to President Trump suggested to the Qataris that instead of selling the plane to the United States, they could donate it for free.

In May, The Wall Street Journal reported that the U.S. federal government had commissioned L3Harris to modify the plane at San Antonio International Airport, though the Air Force had not acquired the plane by that time.

That month, ABC News reported that Trump was set to announce the plane during his state visit to Qatar. Sources told ABC News that Attorney General Pam Bondi and White House counsel David Warrington had said it would be "legally permissible" for the plane to be gifted on the condition that it will be transferred to the Trump's presidential library foundation before he leaves office. Bondi allegedly wrote a legal memorandum declaring that acceptance of the gift was "legally permissible". On 15 May, the Freedom of the Press Foundation submitted a request for the document under the Freedom of Information Act (FOIA) but was told that it would take more than 600 days to process the request. On 28 July, the Freedom of the Press Foundation sued the government for release of the Bondi legal memorandum.

The aircraft is believed to be one of the largest donations by a foreign government, according to the Times, and may be used for post-presidency travel. Concerns have been raised whether the acquisition of the plane may violate the Foreign Emoluments Clause of the United States Constitution. The transfer elicited criticism from conservative commentators, including Ben Shapiro, Mark Levin, and Laura Loomer. The Guardian criticized it as an example of a quid pro quo. The Boston Globe described the deal as an example of an increasingly transactional presidency, describing it as more direct than during his first term and showing that he was "willing to bend for anyone who gives him what he craves: praise, prestige, and a cut of the profits".

On 21 May 2025, the Secretary of the Air Force, Troy Meink, announced that the Secretary of Defense, Pete Hegseth, had formally accepted the plane and instructed the Pentagon to adjust it to the operational needs for the presidential plane. On 28 May, the Washington Post reported that no deal had been agreed to because Qatar required a memorandum of understanding confirming that any transfer request had been initiated by the United States in order to ensure that Qatar had no legal liability. Hegseth signed the memorandum of understanding on 7 July.

The cost of upgrading the plane was officially classified and hidden inside the over-budget LGM-35 Sentinel nuclear missile modernization program, but was estimated to be at $934 million due to an unexplained transfer of funds from the missile project. In July 2025, The New York Times reported that an unexplained transfer of $934 million from the missile project was transferred to retrofit the Qatari jet. The confidential nature of the total cost of upgrading the jet, and the fund transfer from the missile program, sparked controversy. Around the same time, in mid 2025, Secretary Meink told Members of Congress that the Air Force was diverting funds from the missile program to pay for the Qatari 747 / Air Force One work.

On 8 August, the aircraft was flown under a new registration, N7478D, to Waco, Texas. On 15 September, it was reported that modification work by the Air Force had begun. The aircraft's future role was described as "executive airlift support" rather than "presidential transport". These modifications were carried out by L3Harris.

In late January 2026, the Air Force indicated that it was on track to deliver the "VC-25 bridge aircraft" for use by mid 2026, though various indications – including a letter from converter AMAC to the Federal Aviation Administration, requesting expedited validation – suggested that corners were being cut, and some work not done, to ready it in time. According to former Secretary of the Air Force Frank Kendall III, the aircraft lacks some of the security, communications, and support modifications that are otherwise standard for Air Force One aircraft.

On 1 May 2026, the Air Force announced that N7478D, now the "VC-25B Bridge" aircraft, had completed modifications by L3Harris and finished flight testing. The aircraft was painted with Trump's preferred red, white, and blue American flag livery featuring a waving flag on the tailplane, with delivery to the Presidential Airlift Group planned for mid 2026. In May 2026, Reuters reported that the White House intended for the VC-25B Bridge aircraft to be operational by 4 July 2026, the 250th anniversary of the United States.

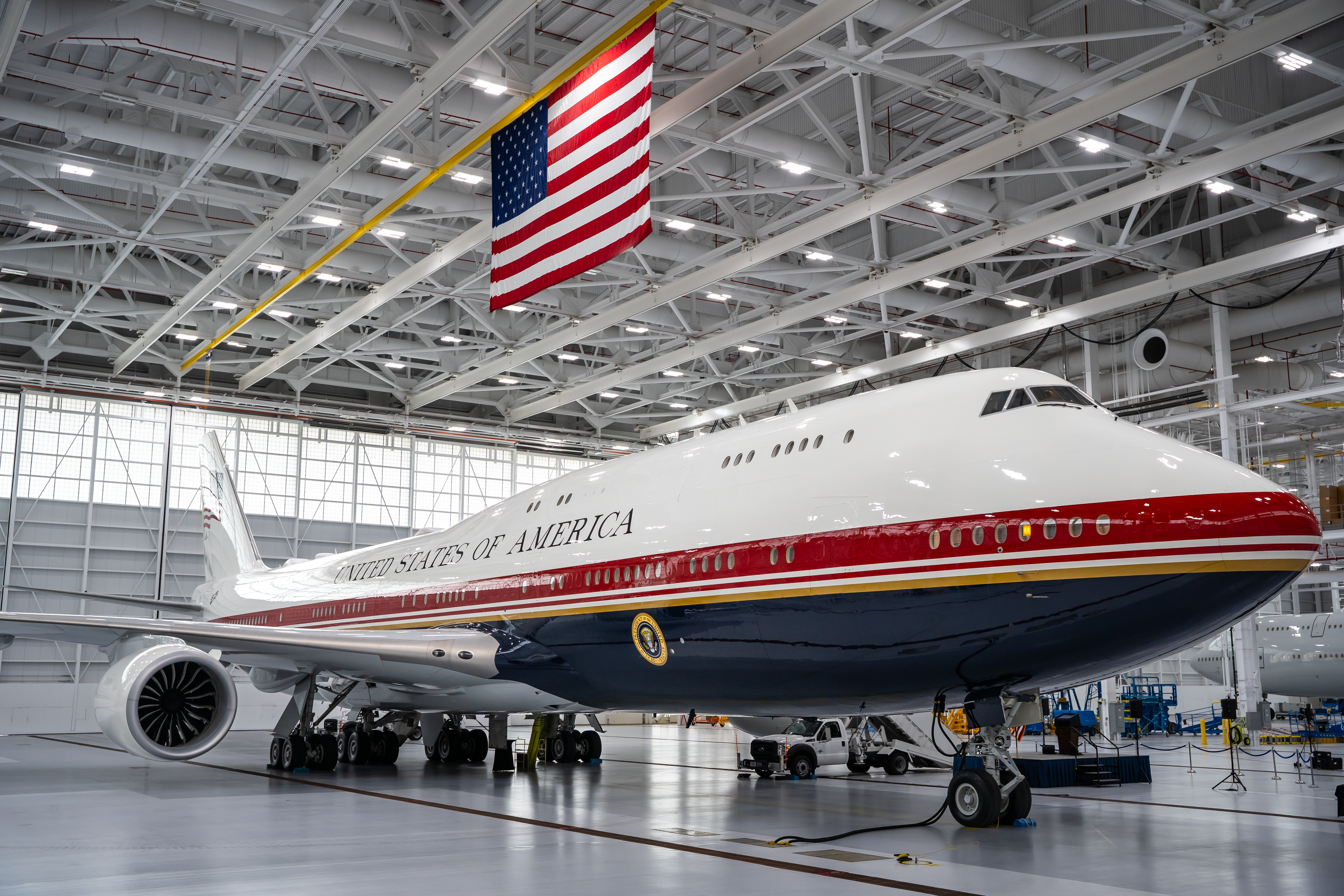
The Boeing VC-25B Bridge pictured inside a hangar at Joint Base Andrews during its official unveiling in June 2026.

On 19 June 2026, the aircraft was officially unveiled at Joint Base Andrews. The Air Force said that the aircraft would be undergoing commissioning flights to allow the White House team to validate its capabilities and the Air Force to finalize its operation protocols.

On 1 July 2026, the aircraft was first used as Air Force One, carrying President Trump to Bismarck, North Dakota to attend the dedication of the Theodore Roosevelt Presidential Library in Medora.

On 4 July 2026, the plane performed in the Washington, DC military flyovers during the America 250 celebration. The aircraft made its first international flight as Air Force One the following week, when it carried Trump to the 2026 Ankara NATO summit in Turkey on 7 July. The VC-25B Bridge departed for RAF Mildenhall without Trump the following day. Trump was initially reported to have departed for Mildenhall on a VC-25A following the summit. Trump said his departure on the VC-25A was "for old time's sake". However, defense publication TWZ reported that the decision to use the VC-25A came amid heightened security concerns surrounding the president, noting concerns that had been raised about the defensive capabilities of the VC-25B Bridge. The New York Times reported that the swap was precautionary and made at the advice of the US Secret Service rather than in response to a specific threat. The Washington Post later reported that Trump had not flown on the VC-25A, but had instead been secretly transferred to a C-32A, with the VC-25A acting as a decoy.

On 19 July, Trump said the VC-25B Bridge would be temporarily taken out of service "in about a month or so" to be "maxed out", referring to planned upgrades to the aircraft. Trump did not specify what would be upgraded. TWZ noted that, unlike the VC-25A, the VC-25B Bridge lacks visible defensive systems. White House press secretary Karoline Leavitt said that Trump would fly on the VC-25A while the bridge aircraft was being upgraded. Trump was expected to continue using the VC-25B Bridge for domestic trips and some international visits to lower-risk destinations before the aircraft was upgraded. ABC News reported on 2 October that, according to an administration source, the aircraft was undergoing cosmetic interior upgrades. However, the source did not mention the security upgrades announced by Trump several months prior.

On 19 November, the VC-25B Bridge completed a nonstop flight of approximately 15 hours from Shenzhen, China, to Joint Base Andrews. The White House described it as the longest nonstop Air Force One flight to date and said the aircraft had made the heaviest takeoff in U.S. Air Force history, at nearly one million pounds (450 t).

=== Planned retirement ===
The VC-25B Bridge is expected to be retired shortly before the end of Trump's second term. Ownership of the aircraft is subsequently to be transferred to the Donald J. Trump Presidential Library Foundation. According to sources familiar with the 2025 acquisition proposal, the aircraft is planned to be retired and transferred to the foundation no later than 1 January 2029.

Democratic members of Congress and other critics have raised concerns that such a transfer violates the U.S. Constitution's Foreign Emoluments Clause, and that it creates a conflict of interest as the President has substantial influence over issues involving the aircraft's donor, the government of Qatar. However, the administration's position is that the arrangement is legal, since Qatar presented the gift to the U.S. government rather than to an individual, and the ultimate transfer will be to a foundation rather than to Trump himself.

== See also ==
- Trump Force One
