= 2006 Asian Games torch relay =

- Host city: Doha, Qatar
- Countries visited: 13 (Including Qatar)
- Distance: 50,000 km
- Torch bearers: 3,500
- Theme: Flame of Hospitality
- Start date: 8 October 2006
- End date: 1 December 2006

On 8 October 2006, a brief ceremony was held at the Doha Golf Club where the torch was lit with a flame. With the involvement of over 3,000 people, the torch crossed eight former Asian Games host countries and four Gulf Cooperation Council member states. The torch travelled back to Doha held by Sheikh Joan Bin Hamad Al-Thani, and the journey around the city itself started on 25 November 2006 and lasted until the opening ceremony of the Games. The first pit stop was in New Delhi, the birthplace of the Asian Games on 11 October 2006 where the torch's flame was fused together with the Eternal Asian Games Flame which was generated from parabolic mirrors directed straight at the sun at the Dhyan Chand National Stadium. During the fourth stop in Hiroshima on 21 October, the torch's flame was fused together with the Peace flame at the Hiroshima Peace Memorial Park.

During the international leg of the relay, the flame was transported from city to city aboard a Qatar Amiri Flight Airbus A310. On board, the flame was carried and burned continuously in a safety lantern.

Below is a list of places visited by the torch:

== Torch lighting ==
1. Doha (8 October)

== International route ==
Route of the torch relay.
No	Nation	City	Date	Notes	Ref
1	India	New Delhi	11–12 October	Host of the 1951 and 1982 edition, Capital city.	
2	South Korea	Busan	14 October	Host of the 2002 edition, Major city. Capital city, Seoul previously hosted the 1986 edition.	
3	Philippines	Manila	19 October	Host of the 1954 edition, Capital city.	
4	Japan	Hiroshima	21 October	Host of the 1994 edition, Major city, Tokyo previously hosted the 1958 edition.	
5	China	Beijing	22 October	Host of the 1990 edition, Capital city.	
5	China	Guangzhou	25 October	Host of the 2010 edition, Major city.	
6	Macau	Macau	26 October	Special Administrative Region, Major city.	
7	Hong Kong	Hong Kong	26 October	Special Administrative Region, Major city. Bid for the 2006 edition, but lost.	<
8	Indonesia	Jakarta	28–29 October	Host of the 1962 edition, Capital city.	
9	Thailand	Bangkok	4–5 November	Host of the 1966, 1970, 1978 and 1998 editions, Capital city.	
10	Iran	Mashhad	7 November	Major city	
10	Iran	Esfahan	8 November	Major city	
10	Iran	Tehran	9 November	Host of the 1974 edition, Capital city	
11	Oman	Salalah	11 November	Major city	
11	Oman	Muscat	13 November	Capital city	
11	Oman	Sohar	14 November	Major city	
12	United Arab Emirates	Hatta	15 November	Major city	
12	United Arab Emirates	Sharjah	16 November	Major city	
12	United Arab Emirates	Dubai	18 November	Largest major city	
12	United Arab Emirates	Abu Dhabi	19 November	Capital city	
13	Kuwait	Kuwait City	20–21 November	Capital city	
14	Bahrain	Manama	23–24 November	Capital city	

== Qatari route ==
Torch relay stops within Qatar
No	Municipality	City	Date	Ref
1	Al Shamal	Madinat ash Shamal	25 November	
2	Al-Shahaniya	Dukhan	26 November	
3	Al Wakrah	Al Wakrah	27 November	
4	Al Khor	Al Khor	28 November	
5	Doha	Doha	29 November – 1 December	
