= Qatar Airways fleet =

Aircraft operated by Qatar Airways

Qatar Airways operates a fleet of both narrow-body and wide-body aircraft, consisting of the Airbus A320 family, Airbus A350 XWB, Airbus A380, Boeing 777, and Boeing 787 Dreamliner families, totaling 267 aircraft.

== Current fleet ==
As of November 2025, Qatar Airways operates the following aircraft. Note that though not affiliated with the airline, some VIP aircraft belonging to Qatar Amiri Flight are painted in the Qatar Airways livery and are not included in this overview.

Qatar Airways fleet
Aircraft	In service	Orders	Passengers					Notes
Aircraft	In service	Orders	F	J	Y	Total	Ref.	Notes
Airbus A320-200	27	—	—	12	120	132		To be retired and replaced by Airbus A321neo and Airbus A321LR.
Airbus A320-200	27	—	—	12	132	144		To be retired and replaced by Airbus A321neo and Airbus A321LR.
Airbus A321neo	6	40	—	—	236	236		First flight in October 2025. Initial A321neo deliveries are leased until owned A321neo are delivered in 2026. Replacing Airbus A320-200.
Airbus A321LR	—	10	TBA					First flight in October 2025. Initial A321neo deliveries are leased until owned A321neo are delivered in 2026. Replacing Airbus A320-200.
Airbus A350-900	34	—	—	36	247	283		Launch customer. Largest operator of the A350-1000.
Airbus A350-900	34	—	—	36	247	283		Launch customer. Largest operator of the A350-1000.
Airbus A350-1000	28	14	—	46	281	327		Launch customer. Largest operator of the A350-1000.
Airbus A350-1000	28	14	—	24	371	395		Launch customer. Largest operator of the A350-1000.
Airbus A380-800	8	—	8	48	461	517		
Boeing 777-200LR	7	—	—	42	230	272		
Boeing 777-200LR	7	—	—	42	234	276		
Boeing 777-300ER	57	—	—	42	312	354		
Boeing 777-300ER	57	—	—	42	316	358		
Boeing 777-300ER	57	—	—	24	388	412		
Boeing 777-300ER	57	—	—	37	302	339		3 acquired from Virgin Australia.
Boeing 777-300ER	57	—	6	53	237	296		6 acquired from Cathay Pacific. Some Cathay Pacific aircraft have Premium Economy seats but are sold as standard Economy.
Boeing 777-9	—	90	TBA					Order with 50 options.
Boeing 787-8	32	—	—	22	232	254		
Boeing 787-8	32	—	—	18	249	267		2 leased from Oman Air.
Boeing 787-9	27	58	—	30	281	311		Order with 50 options convertible to the larger 777-9. Largest single Boeing wide-body order which also includes 30 777-9s and largest single 787 Dreamliner order.
Boeing 787-10	—	75	TBA					Order with 50 options convertible to the larger 777-9. Largest single Boeing wide-body order which also includes 30 777-9s and largest single 787 Dreamliner order.
Qatar Airways Cargo fleet
Boeing 777-200LR/MF	—	5	Cargo					Launch customer.
Boeing 777F	29	1	Cargo					
Boeing 777-8F	—	34	Cargo					Launch customer. Order with 16 options. Deliveries to begin by 2027.
Total	255	327						

=== Gallery ===
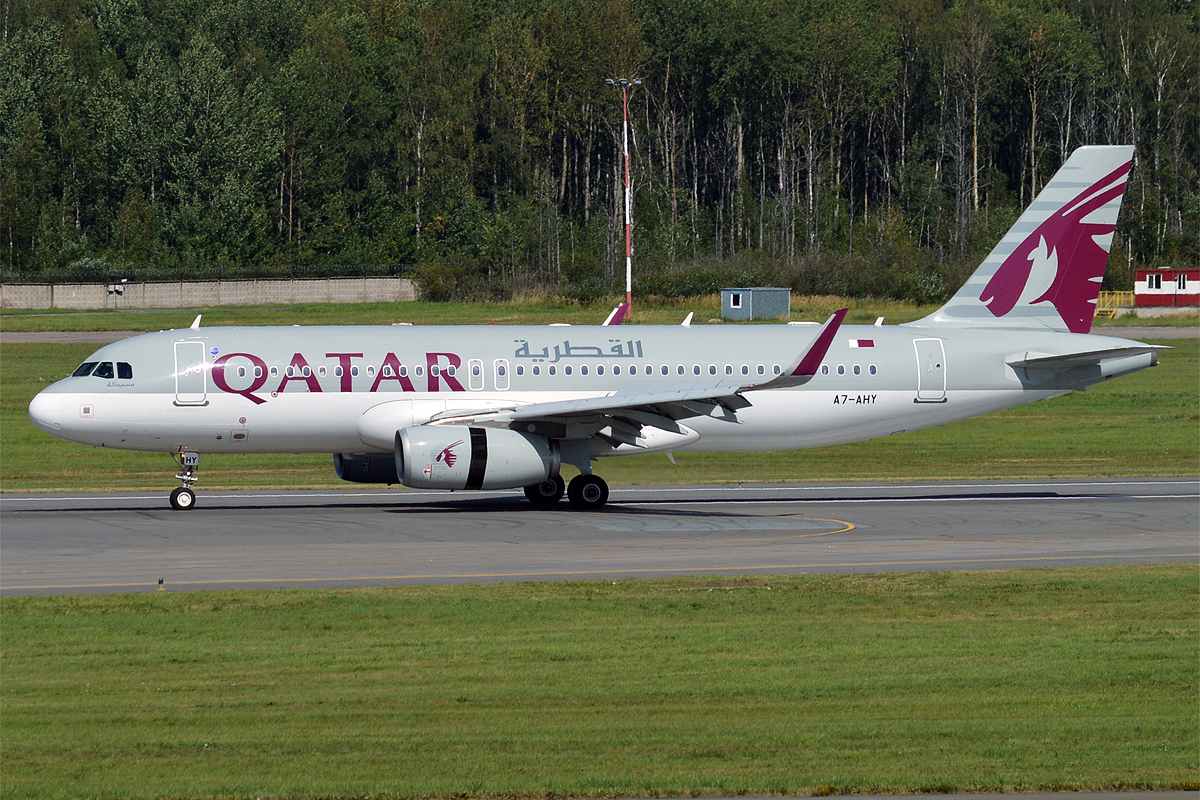
Airbus A320-200

Airbus A350-900 in Oneworld livery

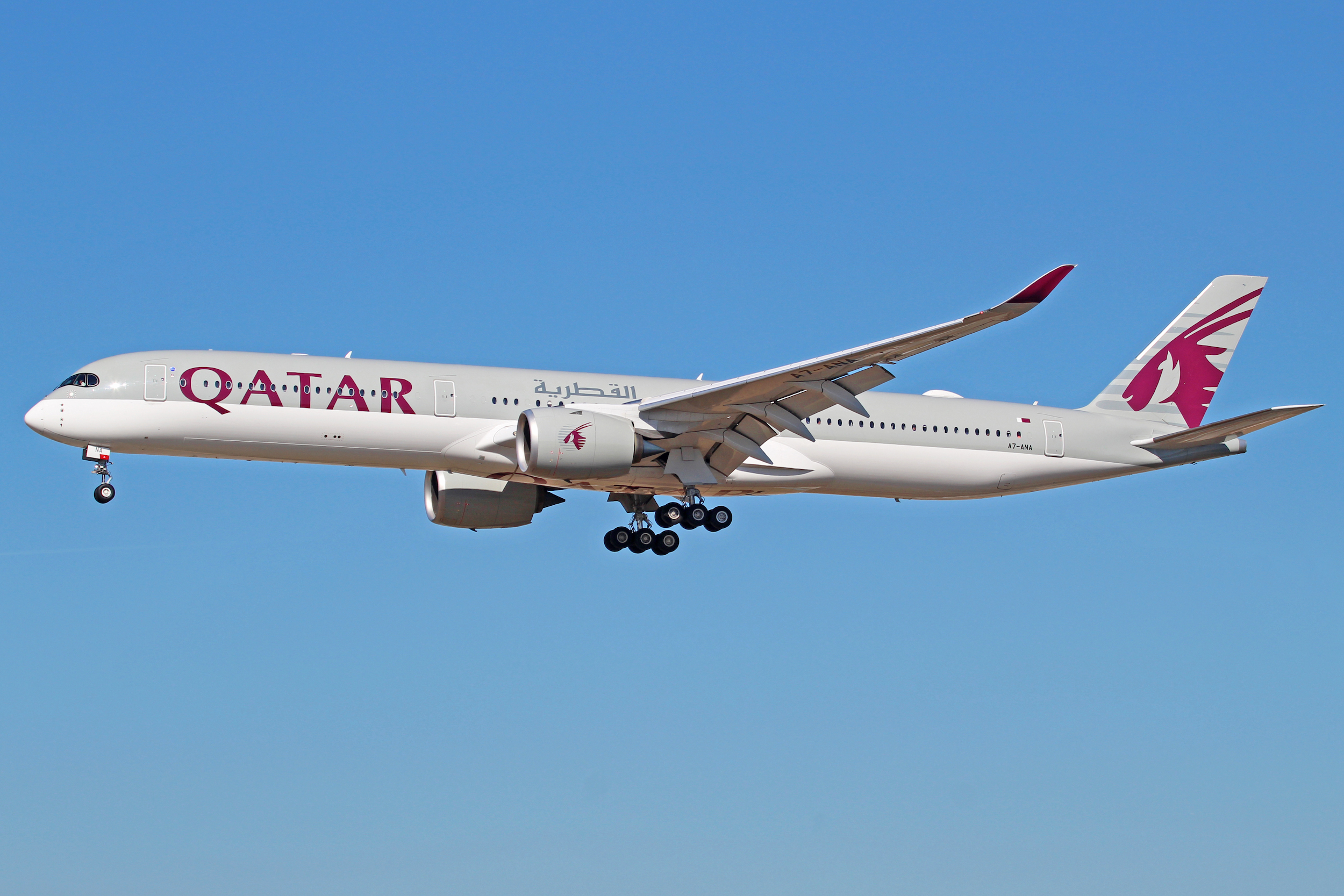
Airbus A350-1000

Airbus A380-800

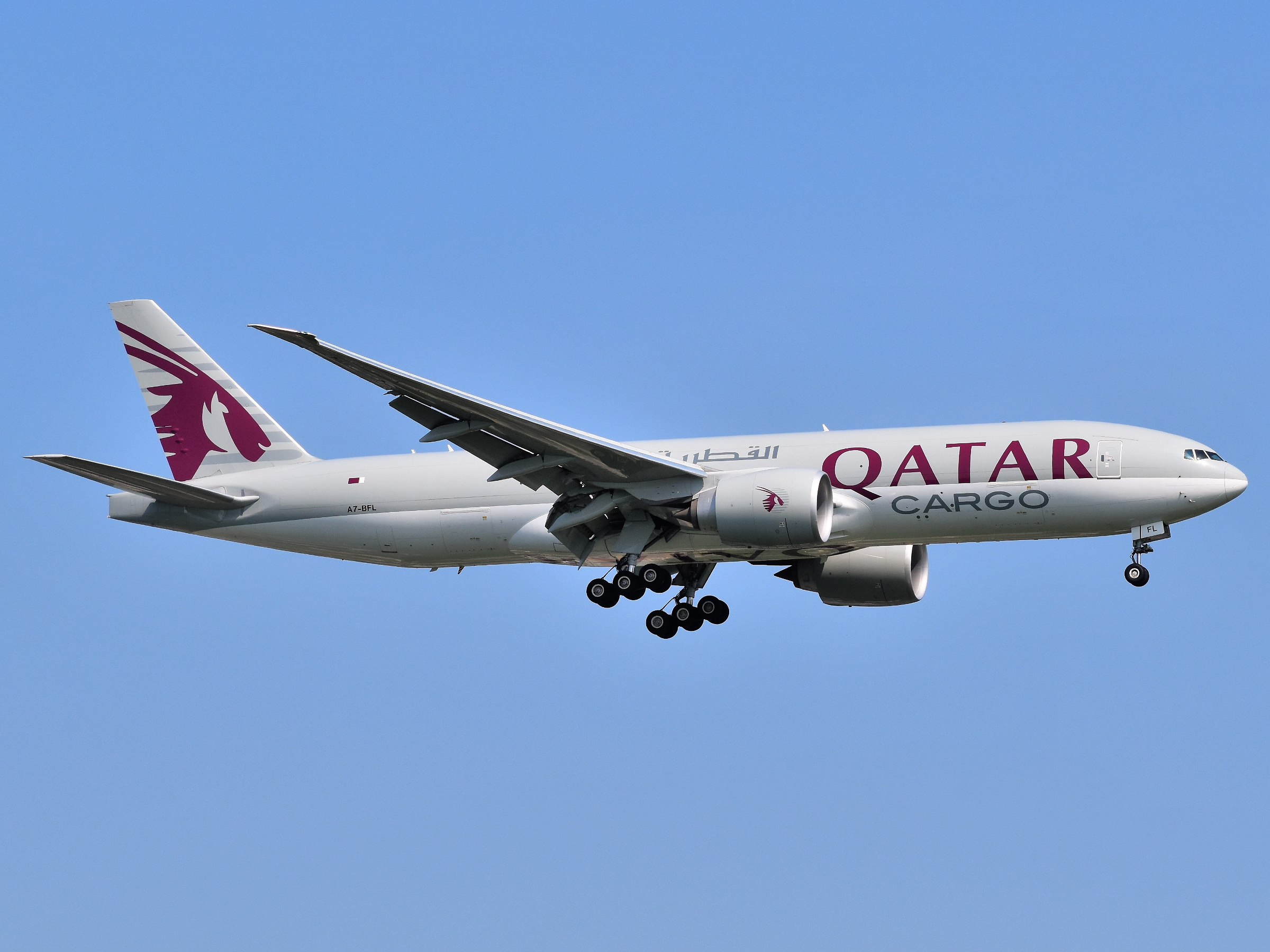
Boeing 777F

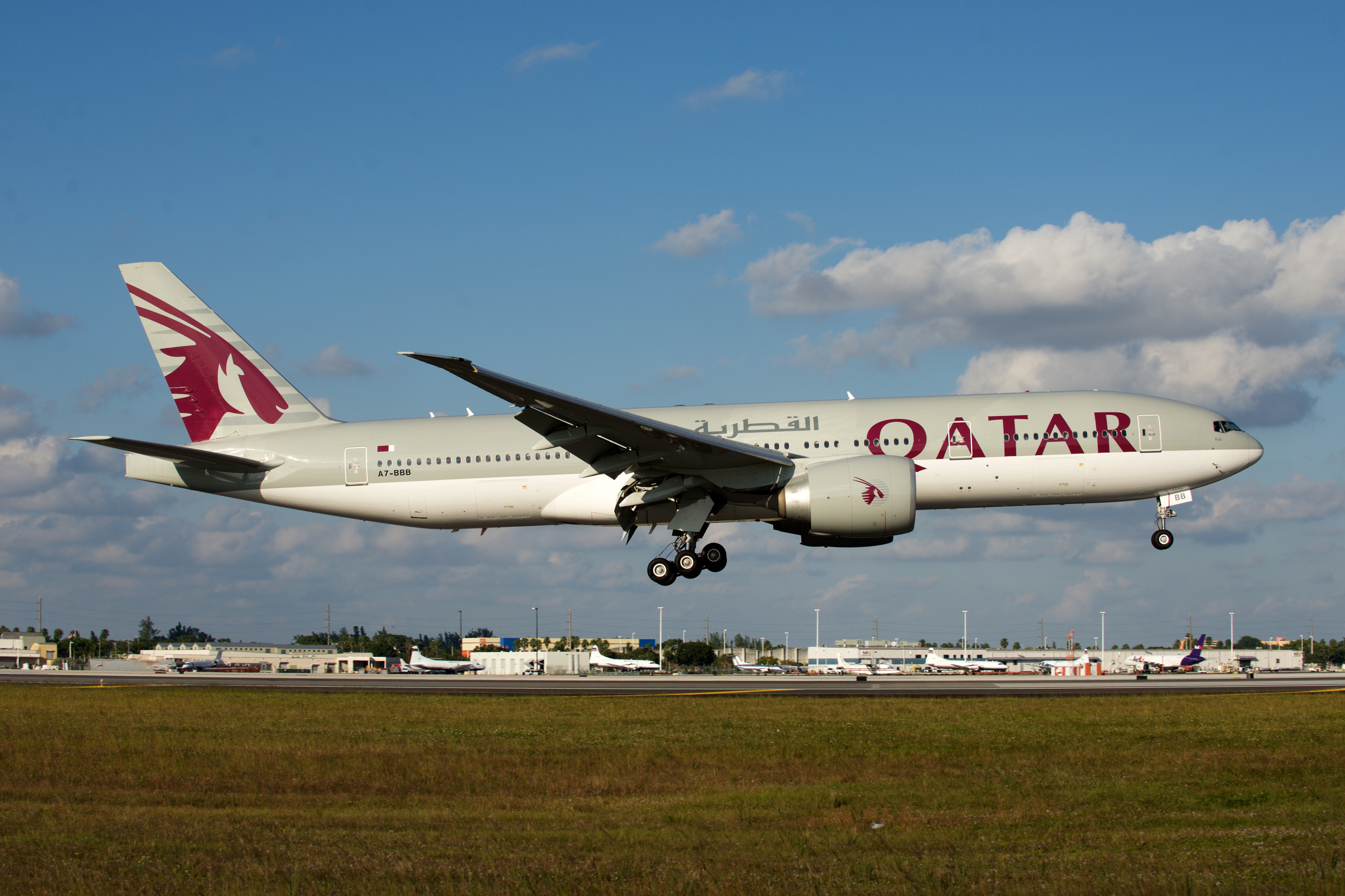
Boeing 777-200LR

Boeing 777-300ER

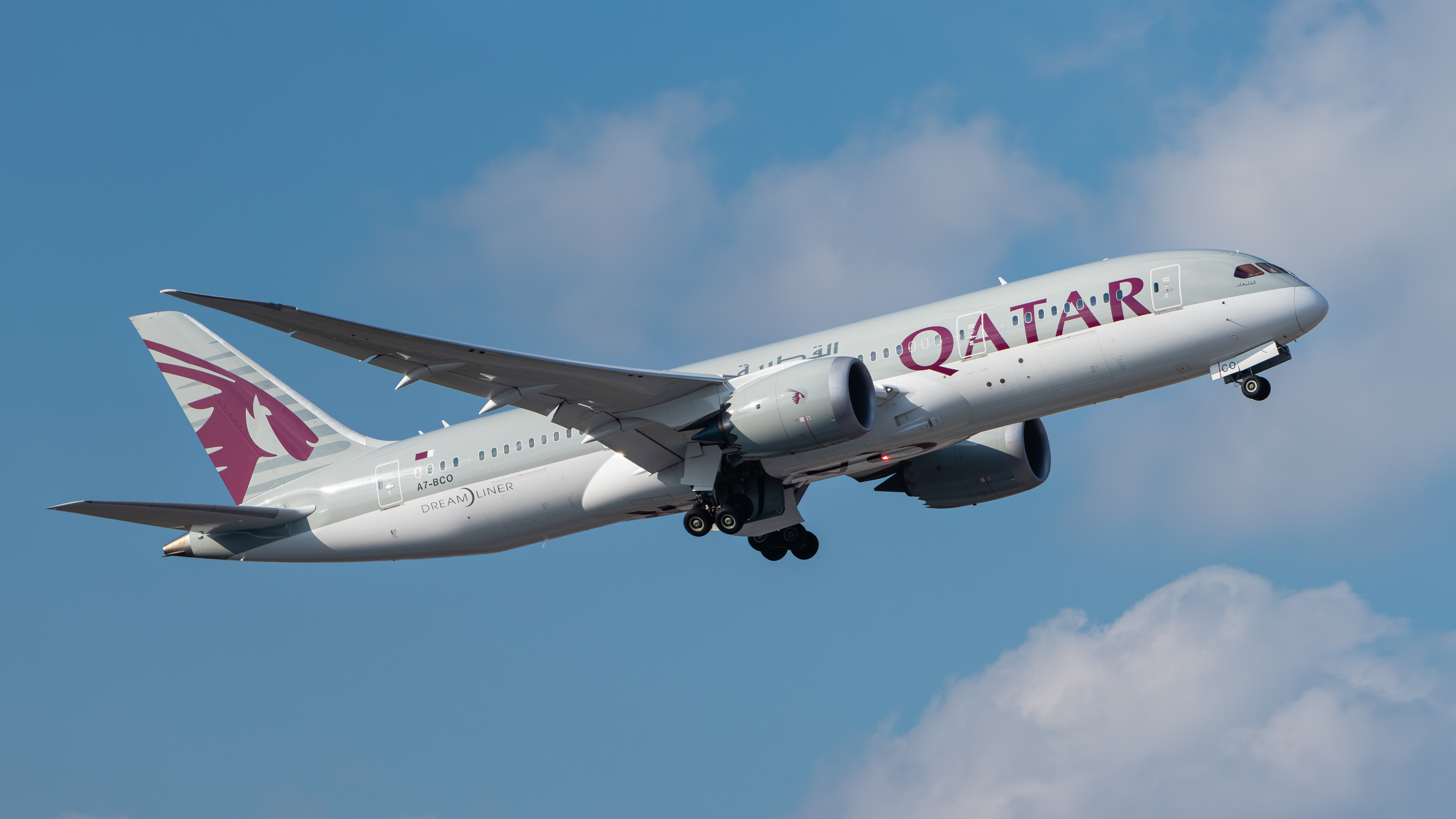
Boeing 787-8

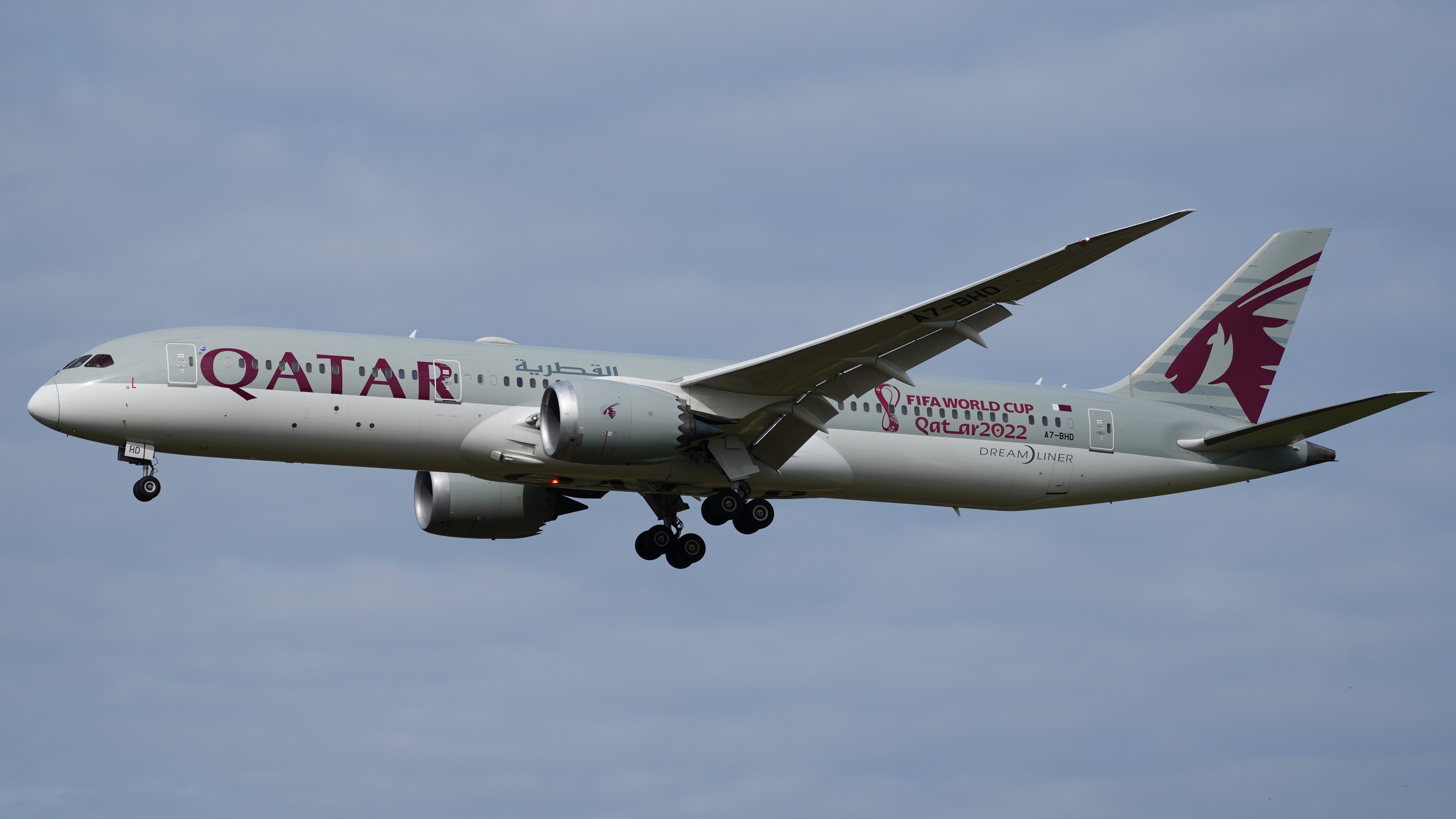
Boeing 787-9

== Fleet development ==
Qatar Airways began operations using a Boeing 767-200ER wet-leased from Kuwait Airways, and two Airbus A310 aircraft. Throughout 1995 and 1996, Qatar Airways began operating the Boeing 747. The airline took delivery of its first Airbus A300 in 1997, and its first Airbus A320 in February 1999.

In 2001, Qatar Airways ordered two Airbus A380 aircraft, becoming the ninth operator of the type. The first A380 was delivered in 2014. The airline also added Airbus A321s, Airbus A330s, and Airbus A340s from 2004 to 2006.

In May 2007, Qatar Airways and Airbus signed a memorandum of understanding for 80 brand new Airbus A350 XWB aircraft. Qatar Airways became the launch customer of the A350, taking delivery of its first aircraft in December 2014. Later, in November 2007, Qatar Airways ordered the Boeing 787 Dreamliner as well as the Boeing 777. The airline ordered one variant of the former: the -8, and three variants of the latter: the -200, the -200LR, and the -F.

The newest addition to the fleet is the Boeing 737 MAX 8, which Qatar Airways began operations with in 2023. The airline has orders for the Airbus A321neo, Airbus A350, Boeing 777X, and the Boeing 787. In May 2025, Qatar Airways cancelled its order for 50 Boeing 737 MAX 10 aircraft.

== Former fleet ==
Fleet history
Aircraft	Introduced	Retired	Refs
Airbus A300-600R	1997	2008	
Airbus A310-200	1994	1995	
Airbus A319-100	2014	2021	
Airbus A321-200	2004	2022	
Airbus A330-200	2002	2026	
Airbus A330-200F	2013	2021	
Airbus A330-300	2004	2026	
Airbus A340-600	2006	2019	
Boeing 727-200 Advanced	1995	2001	
Boeing 737-200	1994	1994	
Boeing 737 MAX 8	2023	2025	
Boeing 747-100B	1995	1998	
Boeing 747SP	1996	2015	
Boeing 747-SR	1995	1998	
Boeing 747-8F	2017	2024	
Boeing 757-200	1997	1998	
Boeing 767-200	1994	1994	

=== Gallery ===
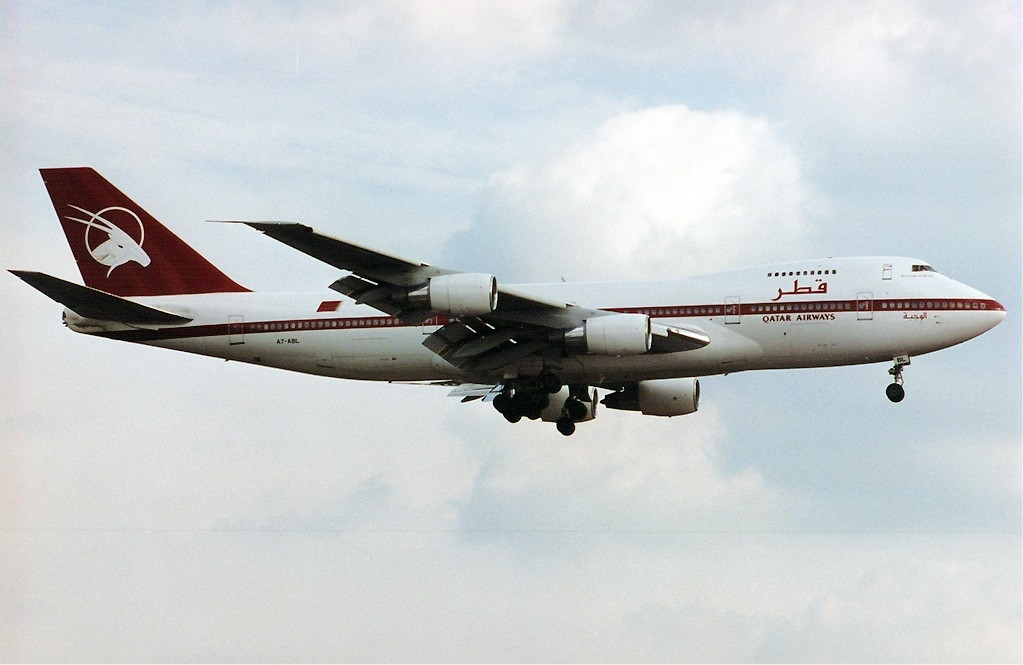
Former Boeing 747SR in 1996

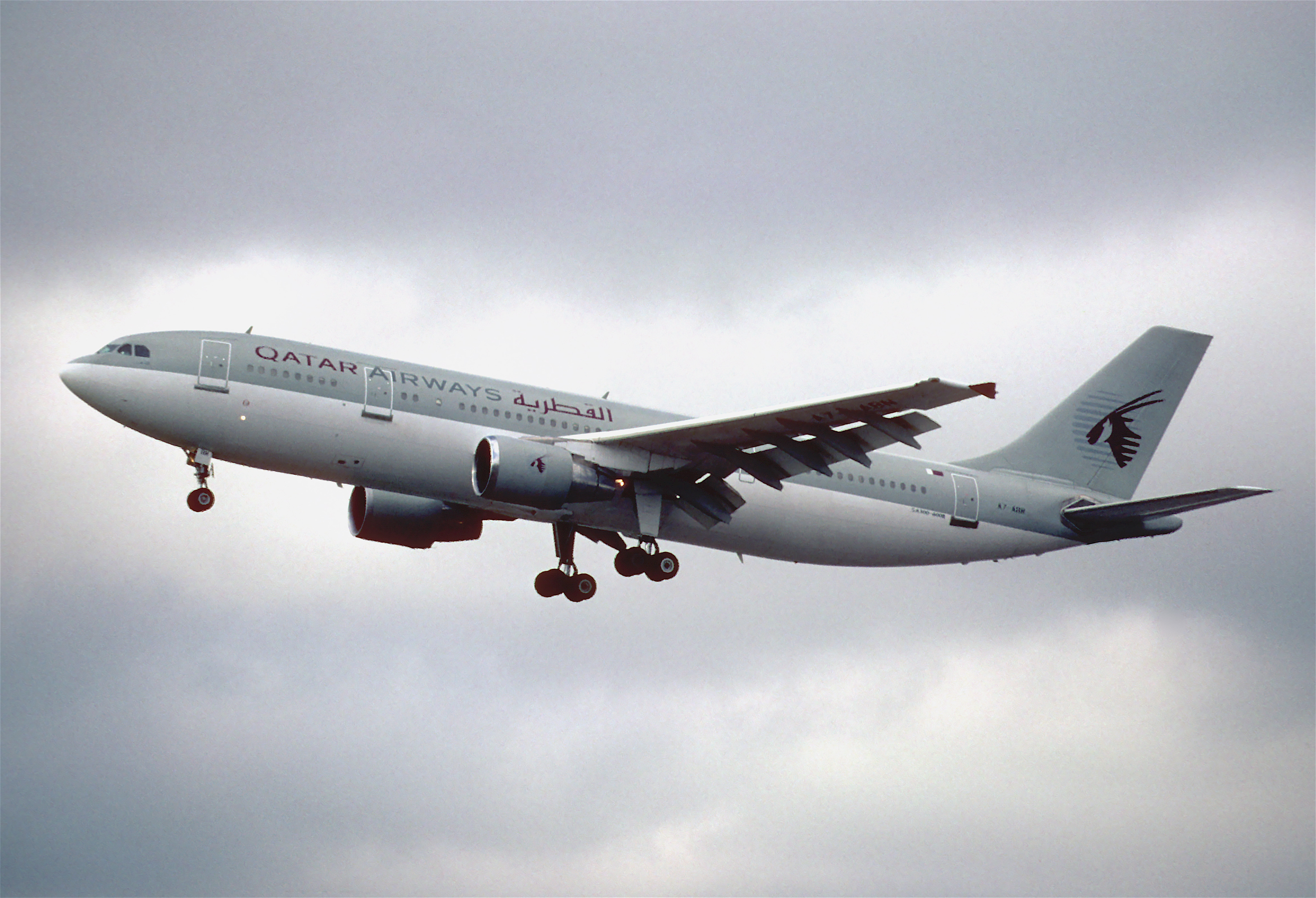
Former Airbus A300-600R in 2000

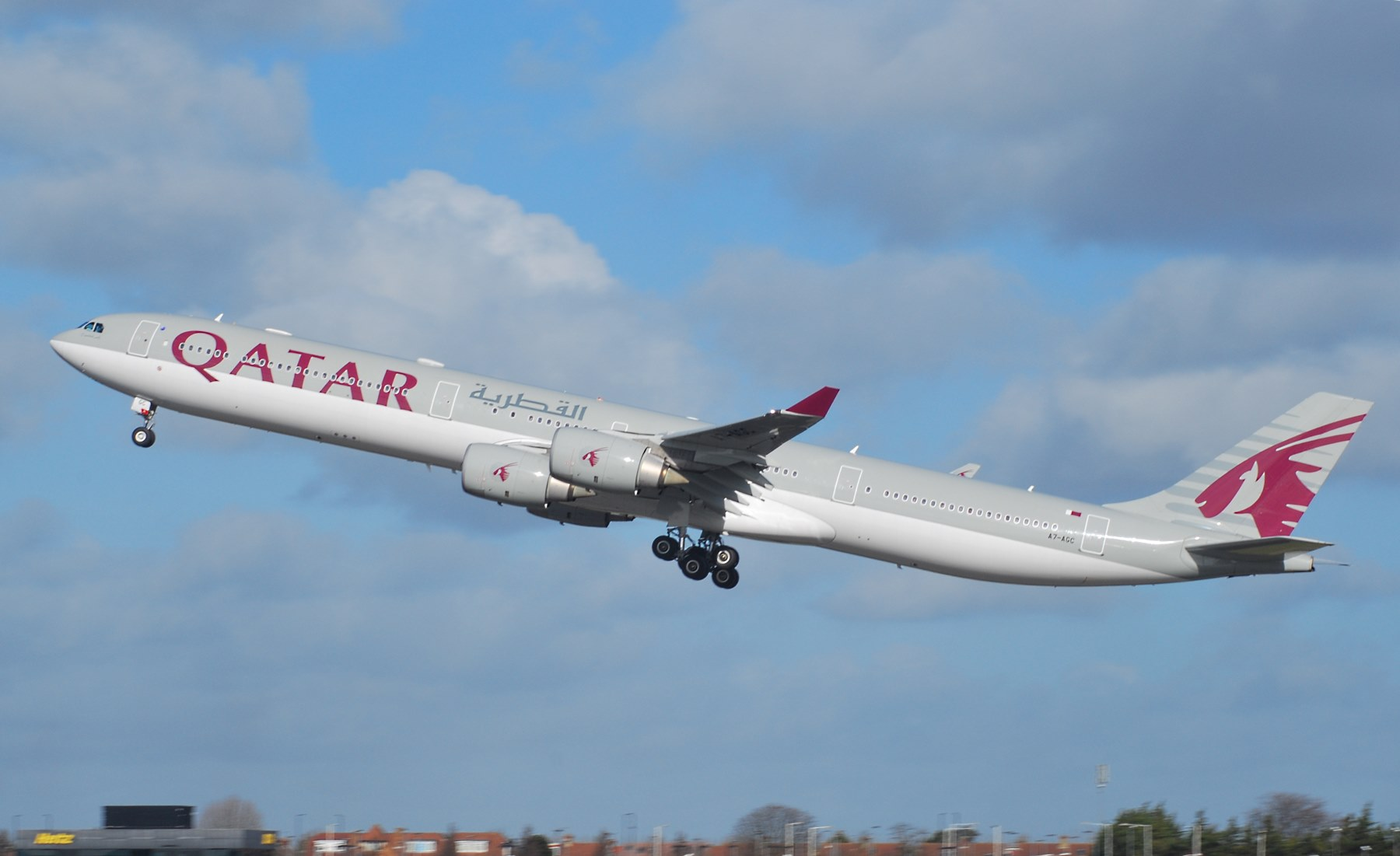
Former Airbus A340-600 in 2014
