= Tai Ping Carpets =

Carpet company in Hong Kong

- Type: Public company
- Industry: Interior design
- Founded: 1956
- Headquarters: 909 Cheung Sha Wan Road; Cheung Sha Wan, Kowloon; Hong Kong
- Area served: Worldwide
- Website: Tai Ping Carpets

Tai Ping Carpets International Ltd. (HKEX: 0146) is a global custom carpet company serving the residential, hospitality, aviation, and marine sectors. Based in Hong Kong, Tai Ping operates showrooms and sales offices in cities across North America, Europe, and Asia, including New York, Paris, London, Milan, and Hong Kong.

The company's brands includes Tai Ping, Edward Fields and La Manufacture Cogolin.

== History ==
=== 1956–1960s ===
Tai Ping (meaning “Great Peace” in Chinese) was founded in Hong Kong in 1956 by Sir Lawrence Kadoorie, Sir Horace Kadoorie, and a group of international business associates. The company initially focused on preserving the tradition of handmade Chinese carpets and supporting craftspeople who had relocated from Mainland China. Early projects included a custom carpet for Grauman’s Chinese Theatre in Los Angeles.

Shortly after its founding, the company director, Anthony Yeh developed a motorized hand-tufting gun that enabled faster and more efficient carpet production and later became widely adopted within the industry. In 1957, Tai Ping opened a showroom in Hong Kong beside The Peninsula Hotel, and in 1959, relocated production to a larger facility in Tai Po in the New Territories.

=== 1960s–1970s ===
During the 1960s and 1970s, Tai Ping expanded internationally, opening its first overseas showroom in Paris in 1963. The company produced carpets for high-profile residences, including Buckingham Palace, Windsor Castle, the Élysée Palace, as well as royal households in Thailand and Brunei. Between 1961 and 1965, the Tai Po factory was expanded to 60,000 square meters. To support growing demand, Tai Ping established the Philippine Carpet Manufacturing Corporation (PCMC) in 1966, the Thailand Carpet Manufacturing Co. Ltd. (TCMC) in 1968, and a joint venture factory in Singapore's Jurong Industrial Estate in 1971.

=== 1980s–2000s ===
During the 1980s and 1990s, Tai Ping continued its international expansion, opening a flagship showroom in Paris in 1982 and its first London showroom on Savile Row in 1985, which was later succeeded by a flagship showroom on Fulham Road in 2024. During this period, the company completed projects including a hand-tufted carpet for the mosque at Riyadh International Airport Mosque.

In the 2000s, the company expanded its presence in the United States, opening a flagship showroom in New York City in 2004, now located in the Architects & Designers Building anchored in the heart of Manhattan's design district, and acquiring the American carpet company Edward Fields in 2005. Edward Fields' carpets have been installed in locations including the White House and Air Force One, and the brand operates through shared Tai Ping showrooms in the United States.

=== 2010s–present ===
In 2010, Tai Ping purchased La Manufacture Cogolin, the French producer of hand-woven Jacquard carpets, founded by Jean Lauer in 1924. Under Tai Ping direction, the company's original workshops were restored and a new Paris showroom was opened in June 2012.

Also in June 2012, Tai Ping launched a new European flagship on Rue Montalembert in Paris conceived by Belgian born, Paris-based designer Ramy Fischler, while today's showroom is now located at 3 Place des Victoires.

Between 2018 and 2024, Tai Ping opened a production facility in Xiamen and launched new showrooms in Milan, Shanghai, London, Paris, New York, San Francisco, and Hong Kong. In 2024, Tai Ping further expanded its global presence with showroom openings in several major cities: New York, San Francisco, Shanghai, and Hong Kong.

== Management and strategic development ==
In September 2017, Tai Ping sold its commercial business to an independent third party. This sale included the manufacture, distribution and sales of machine-made commercial carpet, and it allowed Tai Ping to focus its operations, marketing and sales efforts on custom-made artisan products for use in homes, yachts and private jets, along with high-end commercial locations such as boutique stores, hotels and corporate offices.

In January 2018, former COO Mark Worgan became Tai Ping's CEO, replacing James H. Kaplan. Other key personnel include CFO Alex Lung, CSO Joel Frommann, and Managing Directors for each of Tai Ping's global regions: Sarah Henry (Europe, Middle East, Africa), Celia Yeung (Asia) and Kate Judd (Americas). Nicholas Colfer serves as Chairman.

== Products ==
Tai Ping's custom-tufted products are manufactured in its proprietary factory in Xiamen. The company's hand-knotted carpets are handwoven in independent factories in China and Nepal. Hand-loomed rugs under the Manufacture Cogolin brand are still made on Jacquard looms in France.

== Sustainability ==
Tai Ping holds both Gold and Platinum NSF 140 certifications, from the American National Standards Institute ANSI, as well as LEED (Leadership in Energy and Environmental Design) certification. Internally, Tai Ping has implemented Tai Ping Towards Sustainability, (TPTS), a program dedicated to sustainable practices and achievements.

Tai Ping holds certifications including ISO 9001, ISO 14001, and ISO 45001, as well as Green Label Plus (GLP+) certification from the Carpet and Rug Institute for indoor air quality.

== Awards and recognition ==
The company has received award such as the Vogue Living Design Awards, and Blue Wake Awards.
