= Donald J. Trump Presidential Library =

Library of the 45th and 47th US president

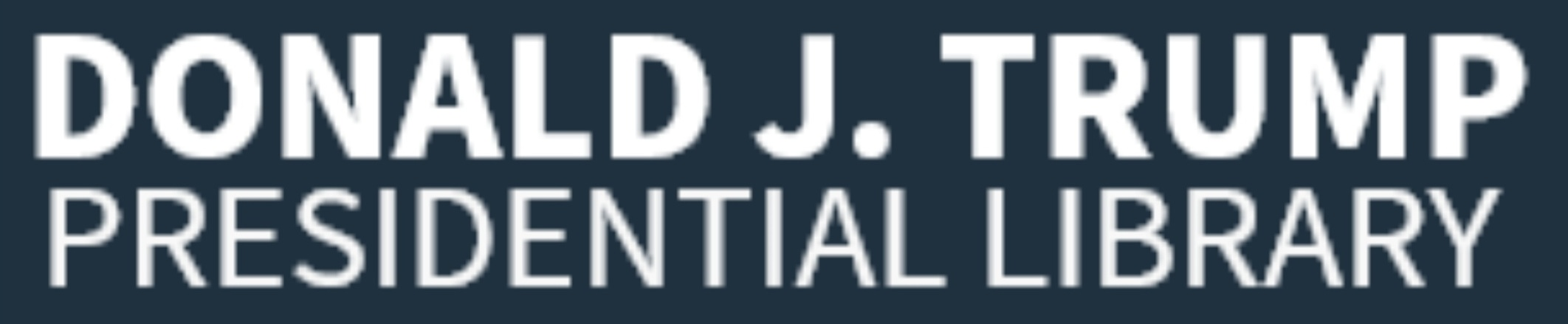

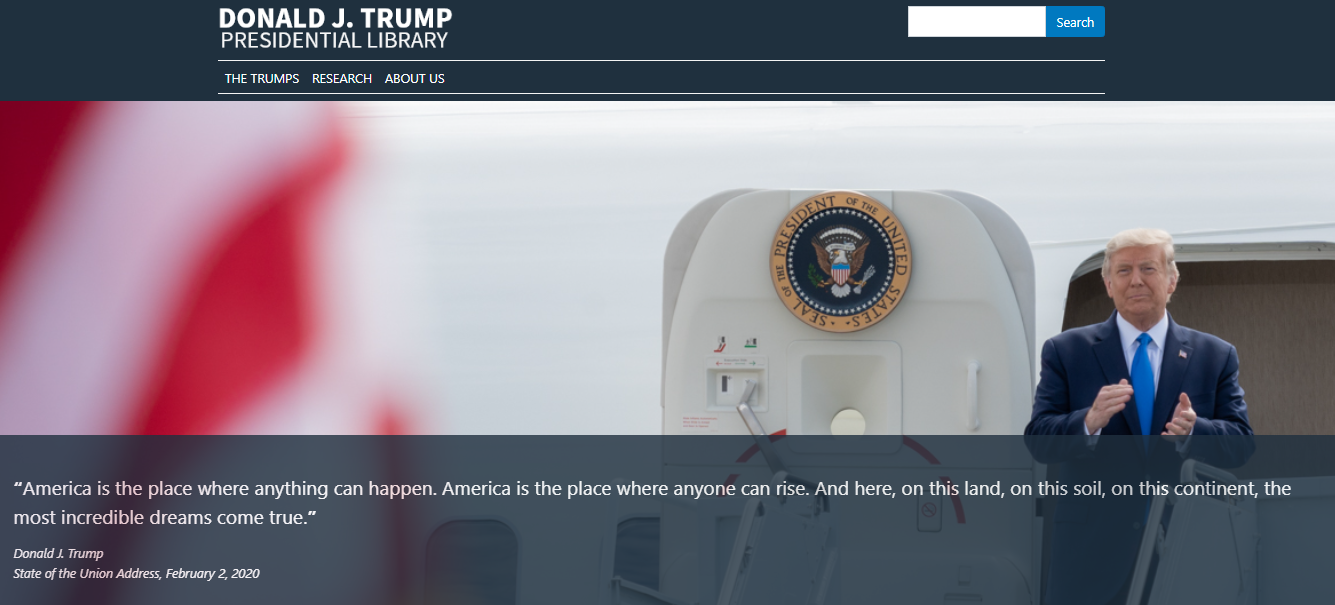
- Available in: English
- Headquarters: Miami Dade College Wolfson Campus, Florida
- Country of origin: United States
- Owner: National Archives and Records Administration
- Creator: Archival Operations Division – Trump Presidential Library
- Key people: Donald Trump
- Website: trumplibrary.gov
- Commercial: No
- Launched: January 20, 2021; 5 years ago
- Content license: Public domain

The Donald J. Trump Presidential Library is a planned presidential library in Miami, Florida. Currently, a website administered by the National Archives and Records Administration (NARA) is in place. The website was launched on January 20, 2021, when President Donald Trump left office as the 45th president after his first term.

The presidential repository will be the 15th managed by NARA. Plans to build the library and museum remain on hold after Trump began his second, non-consecutive term as the 47th president on January 20, 2025. In September 2025, it was announced that the library would be built at Miami Dade College's Wolfson Campus in Downtown Miami, Florida.

== Official records ==
The NARA library is established by the Presidential Records Act and is independent of possible plans for a physical building under the Presidential Libraries Act. All current content has been previously available to the public, including websites such as Melania Trump's Be Best, photographs, and social media accounts including @POTUS and @FLOTUS. Other private records from Trump's first term are subject to access requests under the Freedom of Information Act (FOIA) from January 2026.

While most records will be open to FOIA requests by 2026, records could be withheld from public access on the basis of executive privilege for up to twelve years.

On January 19, 2021, President Trump designated Mark Meadows, Pat Cipollone, John Eisenberg, Patrick Philbin, Scott Gast, Michael Purpura, and Steven Engel as his presidential records representatives to potentially act on his behalf should he be incapacitated and unable to exercise executive privilege with respect to access to his administration's records.

== Building plans ==
=== Donations ===
As with other presidential libraries, a building for Trump must be privately financed and organized before the possible involvement of the NARA.

The Donald J. Trump Presidential Library Foundation was founded in 2025 as a 501(c)(3) organization. It isn't required to disclose donors but the public can glean some information from its annual tax filings. As of July 2026, three of four major donors routed money to the foundation as part of legal settlements:

Entity	Donation	Details
SoftBank Group	$50 million	In May 2026, the Japanese conglomerate donated $50 million; the company is a major investor in OpenAI.
Meta Platforms	$22 million	In January 2025, Meta settled a lawsuit with Trump after they suspended his social media accounts following the January 6 United States Capitol attack, giving $22 million to his library foundation and paying $3 million for legal fees and to other plaintiffs.
Paramount Skydance	$16 million	In July 2025, Paramount (parent company of CBS News) settled a lawsuit with Trump over their alleged deceptive editing of an interview with Kamala Harris, giving $16 million to his library foundation plus legal fees.
American Broadcasting Company	$15 million	In December 2024, ABC settled a civil defamation case with Trump related to George Stephanopoulos's assertion that Trump was found liable for raping writer E. Jean Carroll, giving $15 million to his library foundation and paying $1 million in legal fees to his attorney's law firm.

=== Location ===
During Trump's first presidency, it had been speculated that floors in Trump Tower may be dedicated for use as a future presidential library. The Washington Post reported in the final week of the first term of his presidency that two sources close to Trump said he plans to build a library and museum in Florida run by Dan Scavino.

In March 2025, it was reported that members of Trump's team were scouting universities in Florida, namely Florida Atlantic University (FAU) and Florida International University (FIU), for a potential presidential library. Both locations have extant ties to Trump; FAU is located in Palm Beach County, the same county as his current residence, Mar-a-Lago, and FIU is located in University Park, near the Trump National Doral Miami.

In September 2025, President Trump announced plans for his library to be built on Biscayne Boulevard, adjacent to the Freedom Tower, on three acres (12,000 m^{2}) valued at $67 million. The lot was owned by state-run Miami Dade College. The college's board of trustees met on September 23 and voted to gift the property to the state, and on September 30, the state of Florida approved its use for Trump's presidential library and center. However, on October 14, Florida circuit judge Mavel Ruiz temporarily blocked the land transfer. On November 13, the Florida Third District Court of Appeal rejected Florida Attorney General James Uthmeier's request to have the injunction overturned. Two weeks later, a trial was set for August 2026 seeking to block the transfer of land. A new vote for the land transfer by Miami Dade College took place on December 2, 2025, with the college's board of trustees once again unanimously voting to approve it. During the month, a judge dismissed a complaint against the transfer of land which cleared the way for the library to be built. In February 2026, Donald Trump's presidential library foundation became the legal owner of the property.

=== Design plans ===
Despite previous statements that the library would serve the traditional role of a presidential library, in March 2026 Trump stated that he does not "believe in building libraries or museums," and said that he plans for the building to be a hotel with a Boeing 747 in the lobby. Also in March 2026, a video showcasing AI-generated renders of the library were shared by Eric Trump on X and Donald Trump on Truth Social. In August 2026, Eric Trump announced that an old Air Force One plane will be on display at the library.

== Incorporation ==
The Donald J. Trump Presidential Library Fund Inc. was incorporated in Florida on December 20, 2024. According to the articles of incorporation filed in Florida, the purpose of the Donald J. Trump Presidential Library Fund Inc. is "to preserve and steward the legacy of President Donald J. Trump and his presidency."

This incorporation occurred six days following the disclosure that ABC News had agreed to donate $15 million to settle a defamation lawsuit filed by Donald J. Trump against the network. The settlement was intended to support Trump's future presidential foundation and museum. On July 2, 2025, Trump settled another case against Paramount for its work on a 60 Minutes interview that it was argued misled the American public during the 2024 presidential election. Trump was awarded $16 million to go to the Trump Library. In addition to agreements from X and Meta, the project received $63 million in commitments.

The corporation was established by Jacob Roth, a Florida-based attorney known for his involvement in forming Trump-related entities, including the establishment of corporations: Trump Vance Inauguration Committee, Inc., and Trump Vance Inaugural Committee, Inc. which along with the Donald J. Trump Presidential Library Fund, Inc. have been involved in the settlement of lawsuits on behalf of Donald Trump and family. The corporation was administratively dissolved in September 2025 after failing to file an annual report. A second nonprofit, the Donald J. Trump Presidential Library Foundation, Inc., was created in 2025 and reported $50 million in contributions, though it did not state if it had taken possession of the previous entity's settlements. In March 2026, Congressional Democrats opened a probe to determine where the $63 million in lawsuit settlements earmarked for the library had gone.

== See also ==
- Federal prosecution of Donald Trump (classified documents case)
- FBI investigation into Donald Trump's handling of government documents
- Political positions of Donald Trump
- Boeing VC-25B Bridge, airliner gifted to Trump by Qatar
