= Sources sought =

A sources sought (often capitalized as Sources Sought) notice is used by agencies of the government of the United States to solicit interest in a project under consideration by that agency. They are not requests for proposals or invitations to bid; sources sought come earlier in the procurement process.

Such notices are useful to the agency as market research, by determining the availability of contractors to perform the project. They are useful to the contractors as their responses may influence the terms by which the agency defines the requirements of the project. The notices are published online by the General Services Administration of the federal government.

In the United Kingdom, the Department for International Trade relays some US Sources Sought notices to UK industry as part of its drive to promote UK exports ("Exporting is Great").
