= La Manufacture Cogolin =

French hand-woven rug manufacturer

- Industry: Interior Design
- Founded: 1924
- Headquarters: Cogolin, France
- Area served: Worldwide
- Website: La Manufacture Cogolin

La Manufacture Cogolin, formerly known as La Manufacture des Tapis de Cogolin, is a high-end hand-woven rug manufacturer based in Southern France, founded in 1924.

== History ==
Founded in the village of Cogolin in the Provence-Alpes-Côte d'Azur France, La Manufacture Cogolin was launched by Jean Lauer as a producer of silk. In 1928, the company purchased handlooms, featuring a Jacquard mechanism combining needle, cylinder, and punch-card components, and began weaving rugs.

== Products ==
The rugs are available in a large number of patterns from the firm's archive, which dates back to its origins. Weavers work by hand in panels ranging from 50 centimeters to 3 meters, which are then stitched together in the desired final dimensions, resulting in an offering of traditional, custom-made geometric and plain textured rugs, wall-to-wall carpets, and flat-woven floorcoverings in wool, cotton, linen, raffia, and silk. The carpets are intended for use in embassies, luxury hotels, and high-end private residences.

== Renaissance ==
Acquired in 2010, the company has been revitalized, from a restoration of its original Provence workshop to a redesign of its visual identity. In June 2012, the firm opened its doors again to the design community in Paris, with a new showroom on rue des Saint-Pères.
