= Qatar Amiri Flight =

Qatari VIP air transport operator

IATA	ICAO	Call sign
-	QAF	AMIRI
- Founded: 1977; 49 years ago
- Hubs: Doha International Airport
- Fleet size: 10
- Destinations: Worldwide, on-demand
- Parent company: Government of Qatar
- Headquarters: Doha, Qatar
- Website: http://www.amiriflight.gov.qa/

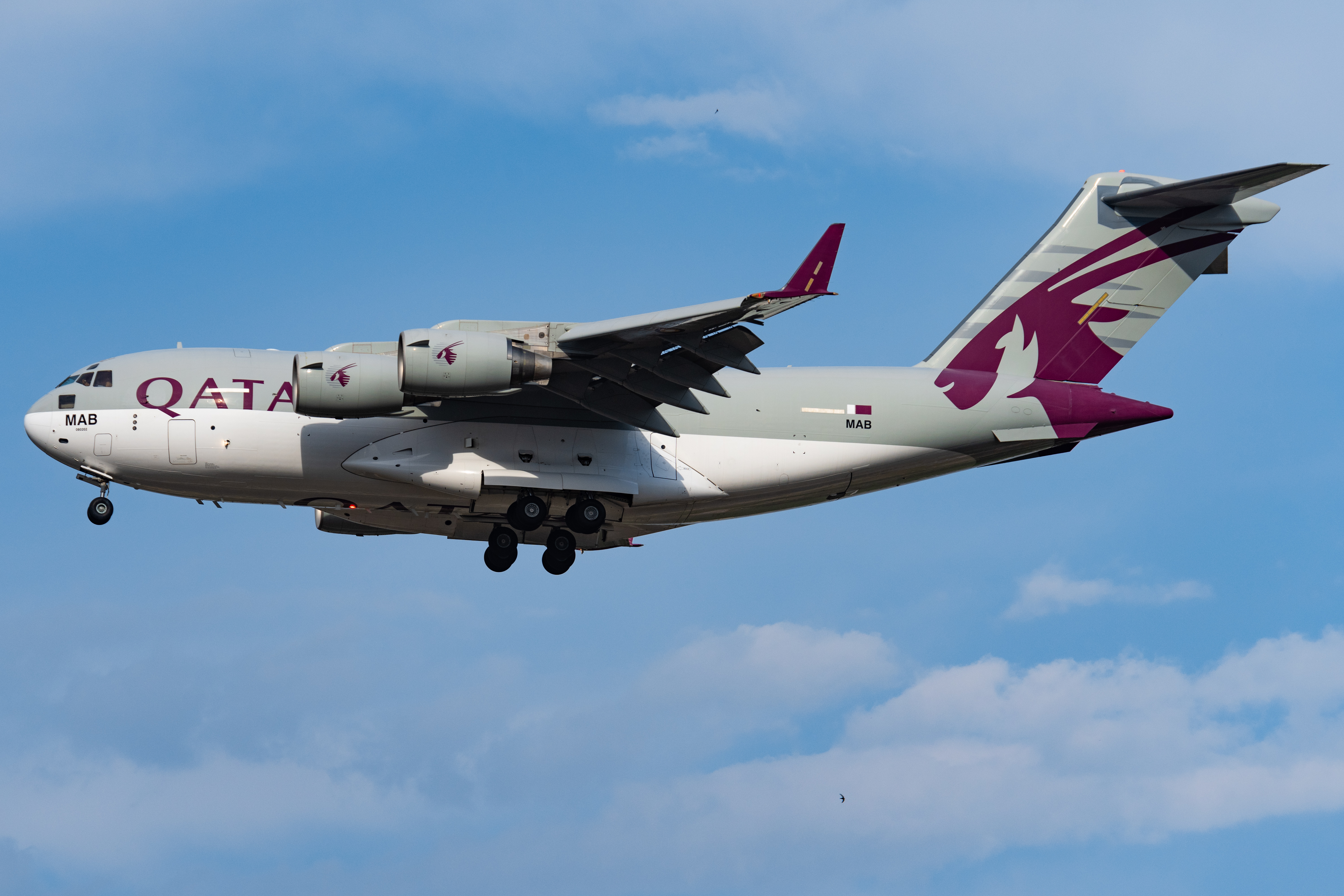
Boeing C-17 Globemaster III, owned on behalf of Qatar Emiri Air Force

Qatar Amiri Flight is a VIP air transport operator owned and operated by the government of Qatar. It operates on-demand, worldwide charters and caters almost exclusively to the royal family of Qatar and government officials. The majority of its fleet is painted in the standard livery of flag carrier airline Qatar Airways.

While commercial flights of Qatar Airways operate from Hamad International Airport since 2014, the Qatar Amiri Flight remains based in the old Doha International Airport.

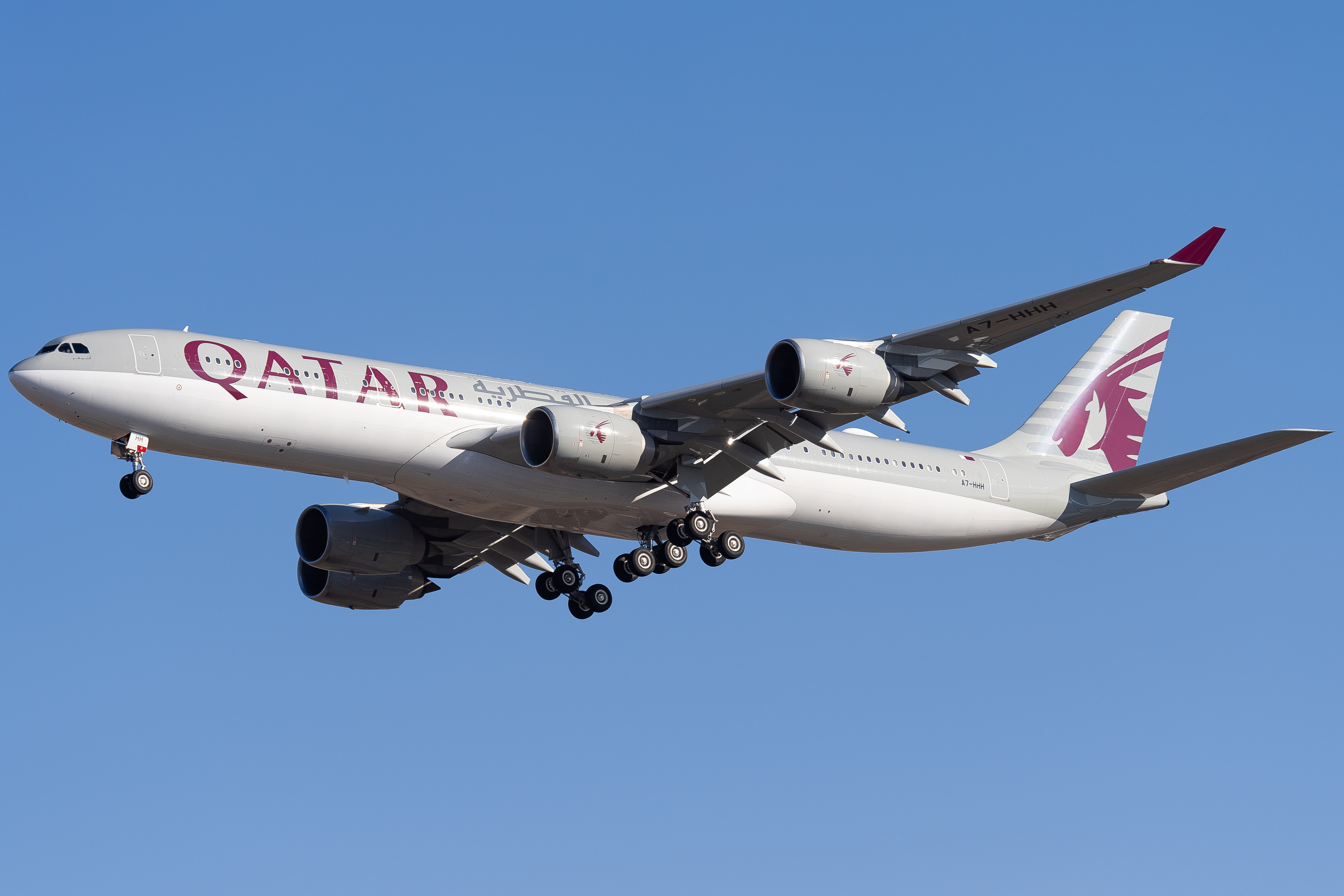
Airbus A340-500 in Qatar Airways' current livery

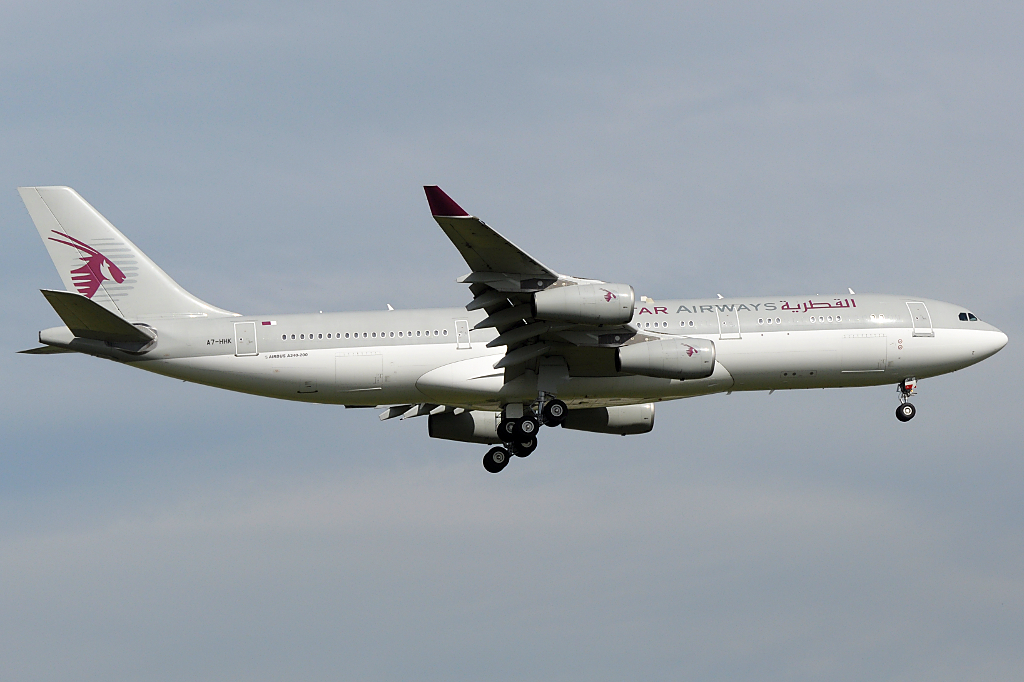
Airbus A340-200in Qatar Airways' older livery

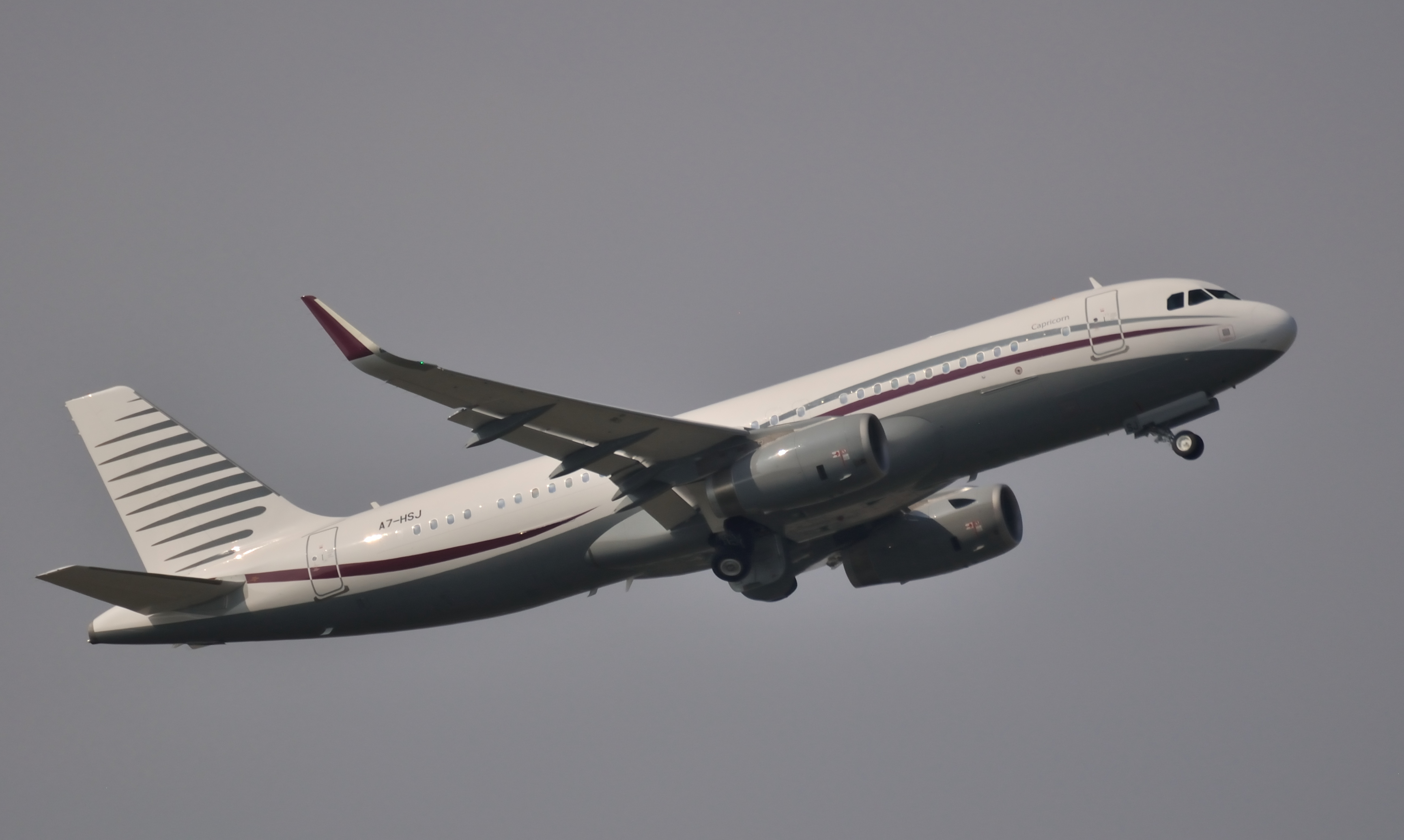
Airbus A320-200

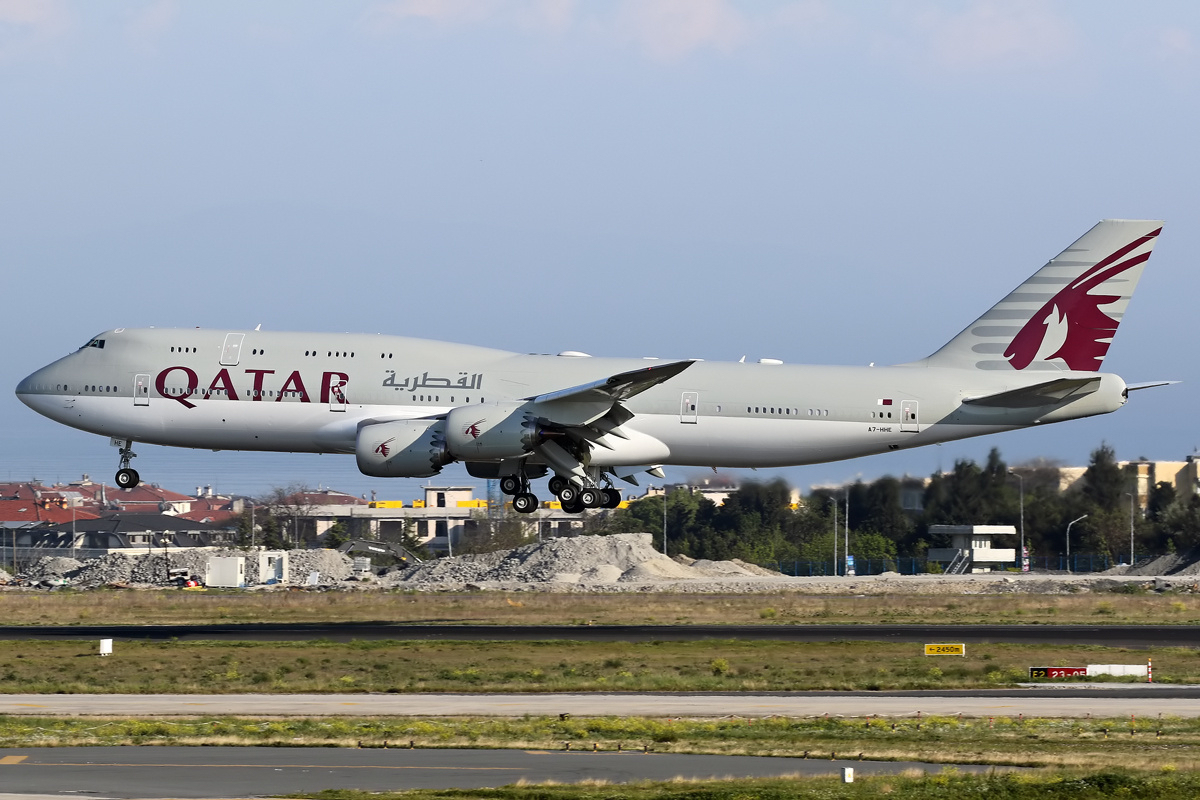
Boeing 747-8 in Qatar Airways livery in 2016

== Current fleet ==
As of August 2025, the Qatar Amiri Flight fleet comprises the following aircraft:

Qatar Amiri Flight fleet
Aircraft	In service	Orders	Passengers	Notes
Airbus A319-100/ACJ	1	—	VIP	
Airbus A320-200/ACJ	2	—	VIP	
Airbus A330-200	2	—	VIP	
Airbus A340-500	1	—	VIP	
Boeing 747-8/BBJ	2	—	VIP	
Boeing C-17 Globemaster IIIJ	1	—	Military	Operated on behalf of the Qatar Emiri Air Force
Gulfstream G700	1	—	VIP	
Total	10	—		
