= XXXXIX Corps =

XXXXIX Corps, XLIX Corps, or 49th Corps may refer to:

- XXXXIX Mountain Corps, Wehrmacht, Germany
- 49th Army Corps, Russian Empire
- 49th (Post Office Rifles) Middlesex Rifle Volunteer Corps, United Kingdom

== See also ==
- List of military corps by number
- 49th Brigade (disambiguation)
- 49th Division (disambiguation)
- 49th Regiment (disambiguation)
- 49th Squadron (disambiguation)
- 49th (disambiguation)
