= 49th =

49th is the ordinal form of the number 49. 49th or Forty-ninth may also refer to:

- A fraction, 1/49, equal to one of 49 equal parts

== Geography ==
- 49th meridian east, a line of longitude
- 49th meridian west, a line of longitude
- 49th parallel north, a circle of latitude
- 49th parallel south, a circle of latitude
- 49th Street (disambiguation)

== Military ==
- 49th Army
- 49th Brigade (disambiguation)
- 49th Division (disambiguation)
- 49th Regiment (disambiguation)
- 49th Squadron (disambiguation)

== Other ==
- 49th century
- 49th century BC

== See also ==
- 49 (disambiguation)
