= 1500th Air Transport Wing =

US Air Force unit

- Active: 1949–1971
- Country: United States
- Branch: United States Air Force
- Type: Airlift
- Part of: Military Air Transport Service
- Garrison/HQ: Hickam AFB, Hawaii

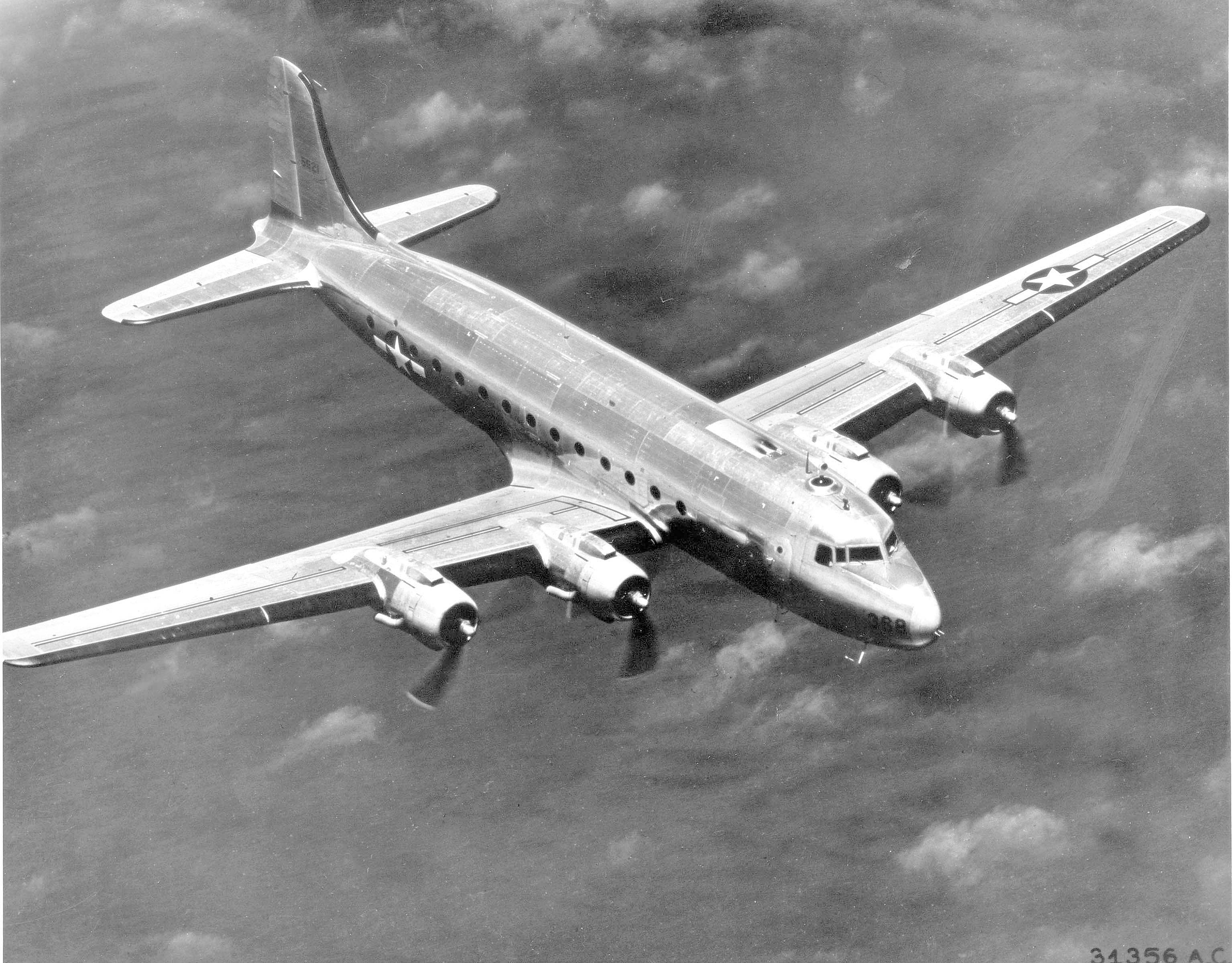
Douglas C-54 Skymaster

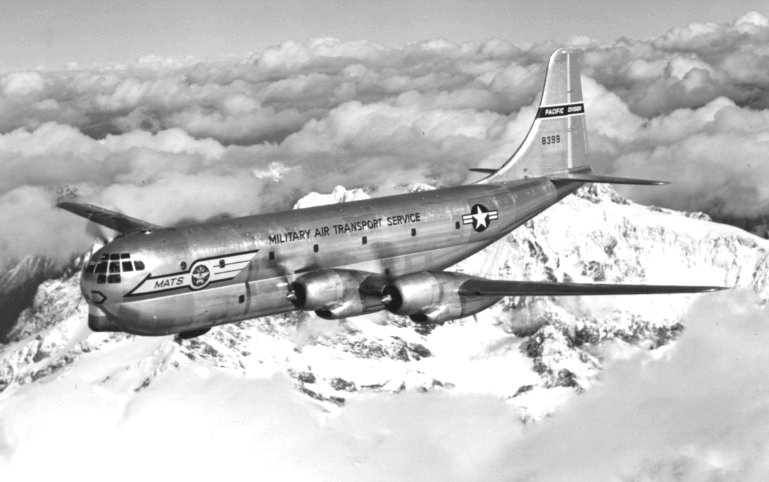
C-97 Stratofreighter

The 1500th Air Transport Wing (ATW) is a discontinued United States Air Force unit. It was last active in 1971 at Hickam Air Force Base, Hawaii under the designation 6486th Air Base Wing (ABW). The 1500th ATW was a heavy cargo transport wing of Military Air Transport Service (MATS), formed on 1 June 1949. In 1952 the wing lost its operational elements and became the base support element for Hickam until it was replaced by the 15th Air Base Wing in 1971.

== History ==
=== 1500th Air Transport Group ===
Military Air Transport Service assumed responsibility for the strategic airlift mission previously carried out by the Air Transport Command (ATC), transporting cargo and personnel to destinations within the Pacific and the Continental United States. It organized the 531st Air Transport Group (ATG) at Hickam to replace ATC's 1521st Air Force Base Unit (Air Transport). The group was initially equipped with three squadrons of C-54 Skymasters that could reach the Continental US, but required intermediate stopovers along the Pacific transport routes to stations as far away as Pakistan. The unit also had association with Naval Air Transport squadrons assigned to Hickam as part of the joint service organization of MATS. The group was a tenant organization at Hickam, which was a Pacific Air Command (PAC) Base. In October 1948, the group was redesignated the 1500th ATG when MATS renumbered its Table of Distribution (TD) units to conform to USAF policy that its TD units be numbered between 1200 and 2100.

=== 1500th Air Transport Wing ===
In 1949, Hickam transferred from PAC to MATS, and MATS organized the 1500th Air Transport Wing as the overall headquarters for the 1500th ATG and support organizations to operate Hickam. In 1949, MATS reorganized its units at Hickam and the wing briefly lost its host responsibilities for Hickam and its operational squadrons. It soon received C-54 squadrons, which were transferred from the 1501st ATW at Fairfeld-Susun (later Travis) AFB. It received its first long-range C-97 Stratofreighter aircraft and two additional squadrons in 1951.

The wing reorganized in May 1952 as the 1500th Air Base Wing and the 1500th Air Transport Group was reassigned to Pacific Division, MATS. The wing continued as a support organization for Hickam and the Pacific Division until 1954. At that time, in anticipation of the transfer of Hickam to Far East Air Forces (later Pacific Air Forces) (PACAF), the wing was reassigned and renumbered as the 6486th Air Base Wing to reflect its new assignment. It remained the host at Hickam until being replaced by the 15th ABW in a USAF program to continue the histories of notable combat units.

=== Major airlifts ===
- In 1950, An earthquake in New Delhi brought MATS aircraft into Dum Dum Airport, Calcutta, with emergency medical supplies.
- During the Korean War, MATS airlifted nearly 50,000 combat casualties and patients to the United States.
- In 1952, when Typhoon Olive struck the island, MATS aircraft flew in fresh water, food, medicine, cots, and blankets, and helped evacuate more than 450 people to Hawaii and Guam.
- MATS supported nuclear weapons testing at the Eniwetok Proving Ground by airlifting more than 14,000 tons of cargo and 13,000 personnel, as well as providing 1,100 of its own technical personnel.

== Lineage ==
=== 1500th Air Transport Wing ===
- Designated as the 1500th Air Transport Wing and organized, 1 June 1949

Redesignated as 1500th Air Base Wing on 17 May 1952
Redesignated as 6486th Air Base Wing on 15 October 1954
Inactivated on 1 July 1971

=== 1500th Air Transport Group ===
- Designated as the 531st Air Transport Group on 14 May 1948

Organized on 1 Jun 1948
Redesignated as 1500th Air Transport Group on 1 October 1948
Redesignated as 1502d Air Transport Group on 1 Jul 1955
Discontinued on 15 May 1958

=== Assignments ===
- Pacific Division, MATS, 1 Jun 1948
- Far East Air Forces, (later Pacific Air Forces), 15 October 1954 – 1 July 1971

=== Components ===
Groups

- 1500th Air Transport Group

1st Air Transport Squadron (later 1263d Air Transport Squadron), 1 Jun 1948 – 17 Jun 1949
2d Air Transport Squadron (later 1264th Air Transport Squadron), 1 Jun 1948 – 1 Jun 1949
4th Air Transport Squadron (later 1265th Air Transport Squadron), 1 Jun 1948 – 23 Apr 1949
47th Air Transport Squadron, Medium, 20 Jul 1952 – 15 May 1958
48th Air Transport Squadron, Heavy, 20 Jul 1952 – 15 May 1958
49th Air Transport Squadron, Heavy, 20 Jul 1952 – 1 Jul 1955
50th Air Transport Squadron, Heavy, 20 Jul 1952 – 15 May 1958
51st Air Transport Squadron, 20 Jul 1952 – 1 Jul 1955
1263d Air Transport Squadron, 30 Jun 1949 – 20 July 1952

Elements deployed to Tachikawa Airfield, Japan during 1951–1952 flying combat resupply missions during Korean War

1264th Air Transport Squadron, 13 Oct 1949 – 20 July 1952
1266th Air Transport Squadron, 30 Jun 1949 – 20 July 1952
1267th Air Transport Squadron, 13 Oct 1949 – 24 May 1950
1268th Air Transport Squadron, 30 Jun 1949 – 20 July 1952
1283d Air Transport Squadron, 24 Oct 1951 – 1 Jun 1952
1284th Air Transport Squadron, 24 Oct 1951 – 1 Jun 1952

- 6486th Air Base Group, 8 Oct 1955 – 10 Apr 1959

Squadrons

- 9th Airborne Command and Control Squadron, 15 Oct 1969 – 1 July 1971
- 6486th Airborne Command and Control Squadron, 5 Apr 1965 – 15 Oct 1969

=== Stations ===
- Hickam Air Force Base, Hawaii, 1 Jun 1949 – 1 Jul 1971

=== Aircraft ===
- C-54 Skymaster

1st, 2d, 3d Air Transport Squadrons, 1948–1949
1263d, 1264th, 1265th, 1266th, 1268th Air Transport Squadrons, 1949–1952
1267th Air Transport Squadron, 1949–1950
1283d, 1284th Air Transport Squadrons, 1951–1952

- C-97 Stratofreighter

1283d, 1284th Air Transport Squadrons, 1951–1952
47th, 48th, 49th, 50th, 51st Air Transport Squadrons. 1952–1955

Note: 1284th Air Transport Squadron (later 50th ATS) operated a VC-97 version of Stratofreighter, 1951–1966 for VIP/Special Air Missions.

== Notes and references ==
- Air Force History Index.org, Individual squadron lookups in AFHRA archives
- Ulanoff, Stanley M. (1964). MATS: The Story of the Military Air Transport Service. New York: Franklin Watts, Inc. OCLC 1213440.
