= James A. Hill =

United States Air Force general

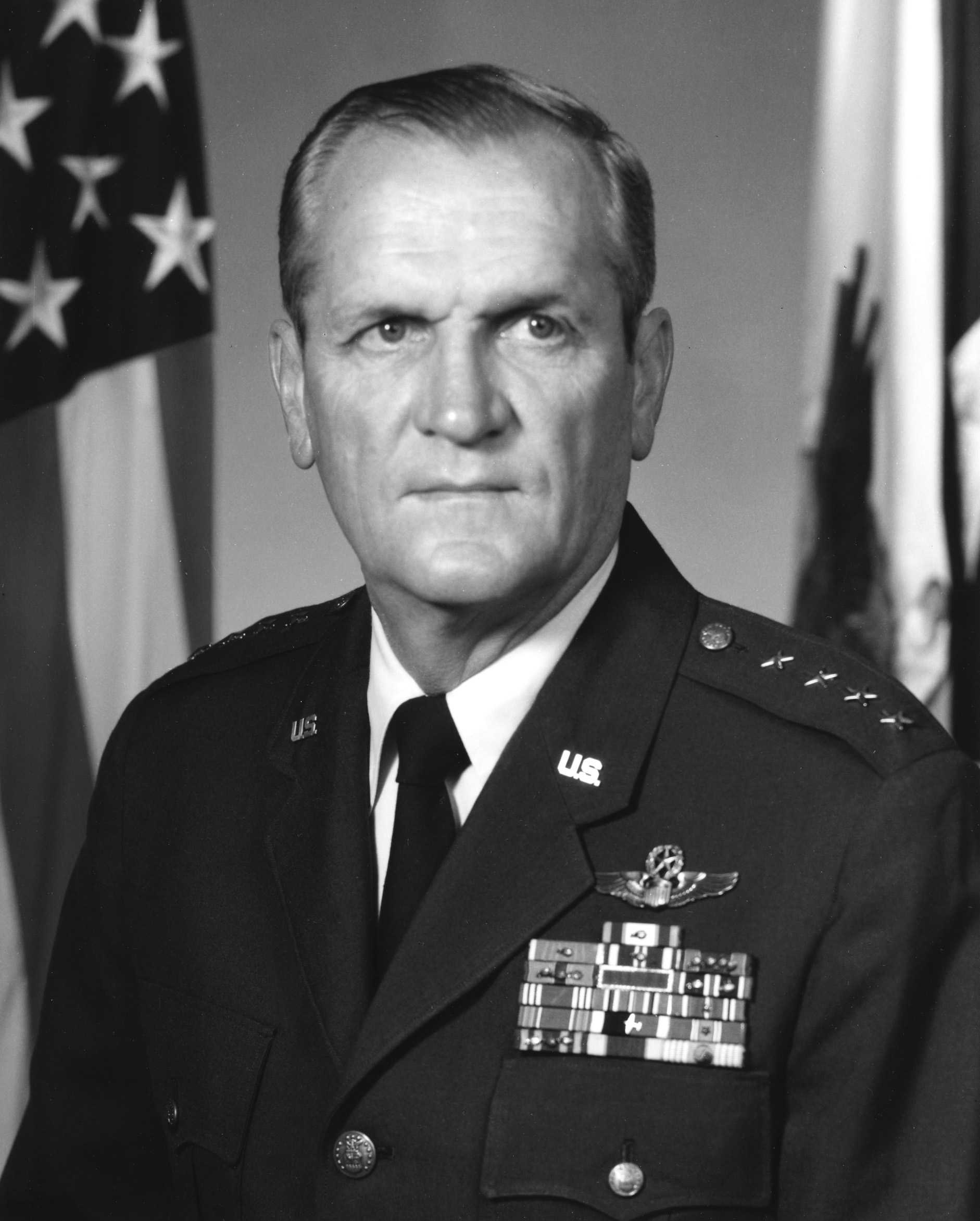
- General James A. Hill
- Born: October 23, 1923; Lancaster, Ohio
- Died: October 1, 2010 (aged 86); San Antonio, Texas
- Military career
- Allegiance: United States of America
- Branch: United States Air Force
- Service years: 1942–1980
- Rank: General
- Commands: Pacific Air Forces; 60th Military Airlift Wing
- Conflicts: World War II
- Awards: Legion of Merit (2); Distinguished Flying Cross (2); Air Medal (5)

General James Arthur Hill (October 23, 1923 – October 1, 2010) was a four-star general in the United States Air Force (USAF) who served as Vice Chief of Staff of the United States Air Force.

Hill was born in 1923 in Lancaster, Ohio. Orphaned at sixteen, he graduated from St. Mary's High School in 1940 and attended Ohio State University in 1942. He was inducted into the United States Army in January 1943 and through aviation cadet training received his pilot wings and commission as a second lieutenant in February 1944. He subsequently qualified in multi-engine aircraft.

During World War II, Hill flew 31 European Theater combat missions in the B-24 Liberator bomber while assigned to the 566th Bombardment Squadron, 389th Bombardment Group. After the war, he served at various bases in the United States until 1949 when he was called upon to fly C-54 Skymaster aircraft in the Berlin Airlift.

In October 1949 he was assigned to the Air Training Command at Lackland Air Force Base, Texas, where he served as a basic training squadron commander, and later as executive officer in the U.S. Air Force Preflight Training School.

In April 1955 he was assigned to the Far East Air Forces, initially as an operations officer with the 483d Troop Carrier Wing and in May 1956 as chief of current operations for the 315th Air Division at Tachikawa Air Base, Japan.

Hill returned to the United States in June 1958 to fill a number of different positions in the Western Transport Air Force (now Twenty-Second Air Force) at Travis Air Force Base, California. From August 1960 to July 1961, he attended the Air War College, Maxwell Air Force Base, Alabama, after which he was assigned to Headquarters USAF, Washington, D.C., as an operations staff officer in the Plans and Capabilities Branch of the Deputy Chief of Staff for Plans and Operations. In July 1964 he became deputy assistant director for joint matters in the Directorate of Operations.

From July 1965 to August 1966, he served as deputy commander for operations, 1502d Air Transport Wing (redesignated the 61st Military Airlift Wing) at Hickam Air Force Base, Hawaii.

In September 1966 Hill was assigned to Headquarters Military Airlift Command at Scott Air Force Base, Illinois as the director of current operations and later as assistant deputy chief of staff for operations. In July 1968 he was reassigned to Travis Air Force Base as the commander, 60th Military Airlift Wing. In March 1970 he returned to Headquarters Military Airlift Command as deputy chief of staff for operations.

Hill returned to the Pentagon in March 1971 as deputy director of programs. He became the director in December 1971; was assigned as assistant deputy chief of staff, programs and resources in May 1974; and assigned duties as deputy chief of staff, programs and resources in July 1974. In June 1977 Hill became commander in chief, Pacific Air Forces, Hickam Air Force Base.

Hill assumed duties as vice chief of staff on July 1, 1978, and was promoted to the grade of general on July 10, 1978. He retired from the United States Air Force on February 29, 1980.

He died on October 1, 2010, after suffering from myelodysplastic syndrome fir a long time.

He was rated a command pilot. His military decorations and awards include the Defense Distinguished Service Medal, the Air Force Distinguished Service Medal with oak leaf cluster, the Legion of Merit with oak leaf cluster, the Distinguished Flying Cross with oak leaf cluster, the Air Medal with four oak leaf clusters, and the Air Force Commendation Medal with three oak leaf clusters.

- Defense Distinguished Service Medal with oak leaf cluster
- Air Force Distinguished Service Medal with oak leaf cluster
- Legion of Merit with oak leaf cluster
- Distinguished Flying Cross with oak leaf cluster
- Air Medal with four oak leaf clusters
- Air Force Commendation Medal with three oak leaf clusters
