= 49th Rifle Division =

49th Rifle Division may refer to:

- 49th Rifle Division (RSFSR), Red Army, Russian Civil War, 1919–1921
- 49th Rifle Division (Soviet Union), Soviet Union, 1931–1946; 1955–1957
- 49th Guards Rifle Division, Soviet Union, 1942–1945
- 49th Motor Rifle Division, Soviet Union, 1957–1964

== See also ==
- 49th Division (disambiguation)
