= Niner =

Niner or Niners may refer to:

- Niner (bike company), a bicycle company that exclusively produces 29 inch wheel bikes
- Niners (Star Trek), fictional baseball team in Star Trek: Deep Space Nine episode "Take Me Out to the Holosuite"
  - Niners, a name for fans of Star Trek: Deep Space Nine derived from the baseball team
- Niner, the pronunciation of the number nine in the NATO phonetic alphabet
- Niners, nickname for BV Chemnitz 99, a German basketball club
- Niners, nickname for the San Francisco 49ers American football team
- A practitioner of the Order of Nine Angles

== See also ==
- 29er (disambiguation)
- 49er (disambiguation)
- Sendai 89ers, a Japanese basketball team
