= 49er =

49er, Forty-niner or Forty Niner most often refers to:

- A miner or other person who took part in the 1849 California Gold Rush
- San Francisco 49ers, an American football team

They may also refer to:

== Sports ==
- Charlotte 49ers, athletic teams of the University of North Carolina at Charlotte
- Long Beach State 49ers, nickname for the athletic teams of California State University, Long Beach
- Yuba 49ers, athletic teams of Yuba College
- 49er (dinghy), an Olympic class of racing dinghy
- Forty Niner (horse), an American Thoroughbred racehorse
- TKS 49ers, a German basketball team

== Music ==
- 49ers (band), an Italian Italo house and Eurodance project
  - 49ers (album), 1990
- The 49ers, an American hip-hop duo
- "49er", a song by American heavy metal band Riot from their 1979 album Narita

== Film ==
- The Forty-Niners (1932 film), an American Western directed by John P. McCarthy
- The Forty-Niners (1954 film), an American Western directed by Thomas Carr

== Other ==
- 49er Fire, a 1988 California wildfire in Nevada and Yuba counties
- 49er flapjack, a sourdough crepe
- Top 10: The Forty-Niners, a novel by Alan Moore and Gene Ha
- The Forty-Niners, or the Year 24 Group, a group of shōjo manga artists
- The 49ers, a group of Cathay Pacific Airways pilots fired in 2001
- 49er, the lowest initiated rank in Triad
- A 4.9% strength ale brewed by the Ringwood Brewery
- A member of the Canadian Expeditionary Force 49th Battalion
- The Forty-Niner (passenger train), 1937–1941

== See also ==
- 49 (number)
- Miner 2049er, a 1982 video game
- Forty-Eighters, Europeans involved in the revolutions of 1848
- Niner (disambiguation)
- 29er (disambiguation)
- 49 (disambiguation)
- 49th (disambiguation)
