= 49 =

49 may refer to:

- 49 (number), the natural number following 48 and preceding 50
- "Forty Nine", a song by Karma to Burn from the album V, 2011
- one of the years 49 BC, AD 49, 1949, 2049
- 49 Pales, a main-belt asteroid
- Tatra 49, a three-wheeled motor vehicle
- Germany's international calling code

== See also ==
- 49er (disambiguation)
- 49th (disambiguation)
