= 29er =

29er may refer to:

- 29er (bicycle), mountain bike built to use 700c or ISO 622 mm wheels
- 29er (dinghy), high performance skiff
- "Twenty-niner", Dahlonega, Georgia gold rush goldseeker

== See also ==
- 29 (disambiguation)
- 29th (disambiguation)
- 49er (disambiguation)
- Niner (disambiguation)
