= 49 Squadron =

49 Squadron or 49th Squadron may refer to:

- No. 49 Squadron IAF, a unit of the Indian Air Force
- No. 49 Squadron RAF, a unit of the United Kingdom Royal Air Force
- 49th Aero Squadron, a unit of the United States Army Air Service
- 49th Air Transport Squadron, a unit of the United States Air Force
- 49th Bombardment Squadron, a unit of the United States Army Air Force
- 49th Fighter Training Squadron, a unit of the United States Air Force
- 49th Pursuit Squadron, later 49th Fighter Squadron, a unit of the United States Army Air Force
- 49th Test and Evaluation Squadron, a unit of the United States Air Force
- 49th Troop Carrier Squadron, a unit of the United States Army Air Force
- Marine Aviation Logistics Squadron 49, a unit of the United States Marine Corps
- VP-49, a maritime patrol unit of the United States Navy

== See also ==
- 49th Division (disambiguation)
- 49th Brigade (disambiguation)
- 49th Regiment (disambiguation)
