= Gaspar Voskanyan =

- Born: January 22, 1887; Grigoriopol, Tiraspol uezd, Kherson Governorate, Russian Empire
- Died: September 20, 1937 (aged 50) Moscow, Soviet Union
- Allegiance: Russian Empire; Soviet Union
- Branch: Imperial Russian Army; Soviet Red Army
- Service years: 1908–1917 (Russian Empire); 1918–1937 (Soviet Union)
- Rank: Komkor
- Commands: 25th Rifle Division; 49th Rifle Division; 4th Army; 12th Army
- Conflicts: World War I Russian Civil War

Gaspar Karapetovich Voskanyan (Armenian: Գասպար Կարապետի Ոսկանյան; Russian: Гаспар Карапетович Восканов, romanized: Gaspar Karapetovich Voskanov January 22, 1887 – September 20, 1937) was a Soviet komkor (corps commander).

An ethnic Armenian, Voskanyan was born in Grigoriopol, in the Russian Empire (now in Transnistria, Moldova). He fought in the Imperial Russian Army in World War I. After the 1917 Revolution he was elected commander of his regiment but joined the Red Army in July 1918 and the Russian Communist Party in 1919. During the Civil War Voskanyan commanded the Samara (25th) Rifle Division from 25 November to 1918 to February 1919. After being badly wounded he returned to service in June 1919 as commander of the 49th Rifle Division, returning to the 25th Division on 26 September after its commander was killed. He became commander of the 4th Red Army on 8 October, commander of the 2nd Labour Army in April 1920 and commander of the 12th Red Army on 10 June. Voskanyan was twice awarded the Order of the Red Banner for actions fighting the White Volunteer Army. Voskanyan became commander of the 2nd Reserve (later 47th Rifle) Division in 1921, commander of the 6th Rifle Division in 1923 and was assistant inspector of infantry from 1924. In 1925 he was appointed assistant commander of the Turkestan Front and in 1926 was military attaché at the Soviet mission in Finland, later filling the same role in Turkey.

During the Great Purge, he was arrested on May 28, 1937, and later executed.

== Awards ==
Russian Empire:

- Order of St. George, 4th degree

Soviet Union: Order of the Red Banner

Preceded by	Commander of the Red Army 25th Rifle Division; November 29, 1918 – February 5, 1919	Succeeded by
Preceded by Pavel Dybenko	Commander of the Soviet 6th Rifle Corps; 1923–1924	Succeeded by Konstantin Avksentevsky
