= No. 49 Squadron IAF =

No. 49 Squadron Paraspears
- Crest of The No. 49 Squadron IAF "Paraspears"
- Active: 2 February 1960 - Present
- Country: Republic of India
- Allegiance: Indian Armed Forces
- Branch: Indian Air Force
- Role: Transport
- Garrison/HQ: AFS Jorhat
- Nickname: "Paraspears"
- Mottos: Dhairya Vijayate; Bold will be victorious

Aircraft flown
- Transport: AN-32

No. 49 Squadron IAF nicknamed as Paraspears is a unit of the Indian Air Force assigned to Eastern Air Command. The Squadron participates in operations involving air, land and airdrop of troops, equipment, supplies, and support or augment special operations forces, when appropriate.

== History ==
The Paraspears were raised in 1960 at Barrackpore and moved to the present location in May 1986.

=== Lineage ===
- Constituted as No. 49 Squadron (Paraspears) on 2 February 1960

=== Assignments ===
- Indo-Pakistani War of 1965
- Indo-Pakistani War of 1971
- Operation Pawan
- Operation Cactus

=== Aircraft ===
- C-47
- C-119
- AN-32

Dacota
