= 49th Infantry Regiment (United States) =

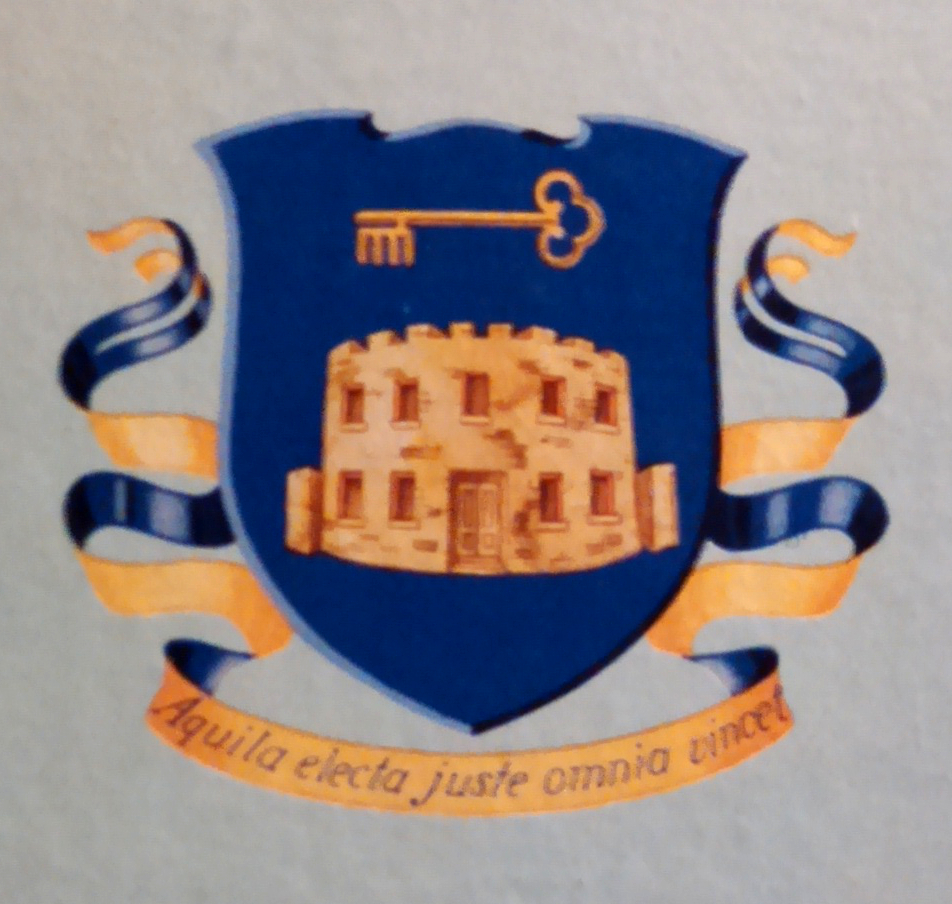
- Coat of Arms, taken from the cover of the Headquarters Company 49th A.I.B. book
- Active: 1917–1922; 1941-1943
- Country: United States
- Branch: United States Army
- Type: Infantry
- Size: Regiment
- Motto: Aquila Electa Juste Omnia Vincet (The chosen eagle conquers by right)

The 49th Infantry Regiment was a regular infantry regiment in the United States Army.

== History ==
=== World War I ===
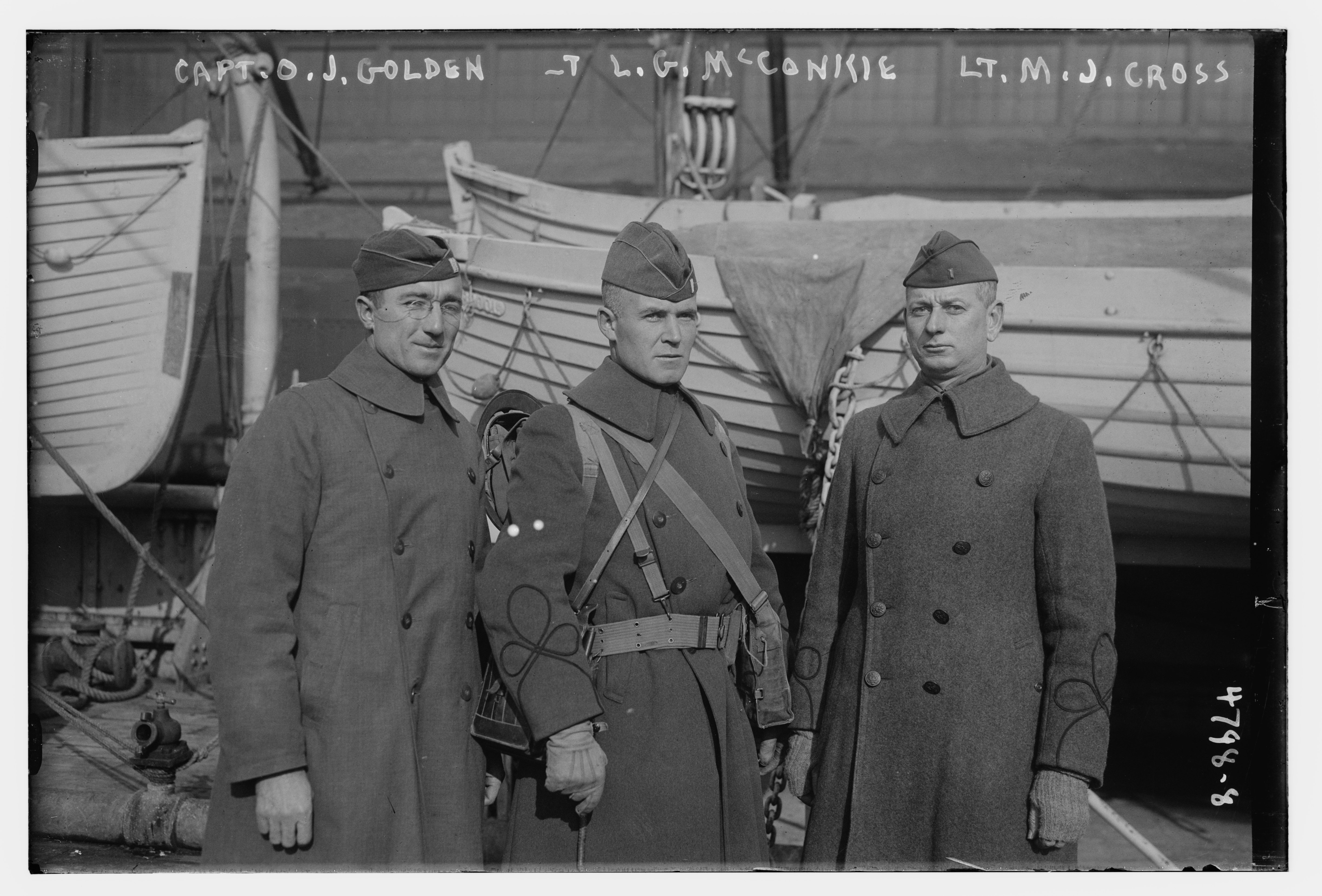
Offices of the 49th Infantry Regiment on return to the United States on the Belgic, January 1919

The regiment was constituted 15 May 1917 in the Regular Army as the 49th Infantry. It was organized 1 June 1917 at Syracuse, New York, from personnel of the 23rd Infantry. It moved to France in July 1918 and was attached to the 83rd Division 12 August 1918. The 83rd Division had been reorganized as the 2nd Depot Division; the 49th Infantry apparently also provided replacement personnel for front-line units. It returned to the US January 1919 and was inactivated on 18 November 1921 at Fort Snelling, Minnesota, with personnel and equipment transferred to the 3rd Infantry. The regiment was disbanded on 31 July 1922.

=== World War II ===
The 49th Infantry Regiment was reconstituted in the Regular Army as the 49th Armored Infantry on 18 July 1941 and assigned to the 8th Armored Division. It was activated 1 April 1942 at Fort Knox, Kentucky. The regiment was broken up on 20 September 1943, and its elements were reorganized and redesignated as elements of the 8th Armored Division as follows:

- 49th Armored Infantry, less the 1st and 2nd Battalions, as the 49th Armored Infantry Battalion.
- 1st Battalion, 49th Armored Infantry as the 58th Armored Infantry Battalion.
- 2nd Battalion, 49th Armored Infantry as the 7th Armored Infantry Battalion.

== Campaign streamers ==
World War I

- without Inscription

== Coat of arms ==
The field is blue for Infantry. The tower is taken from the stone tower at Fort Snelling, the station of the regiment. The key is from the arms of Le Mans, France and commemorates the service of the regiment in the vicinity of that city in 1918.
