= Niner (bicycle company) =

American bicycle manufacturer

- Industry: Bicycles
- Founded: 2005; 21 years ago
- Founder: Chris Sugai, Steve Domahidy
- Headquarters: Fort Collins, Colorado, United States
- Products: Mountain Bikes; Cyclocross Bikes; Touring Bikes
- Website: www.ninerbikes.com

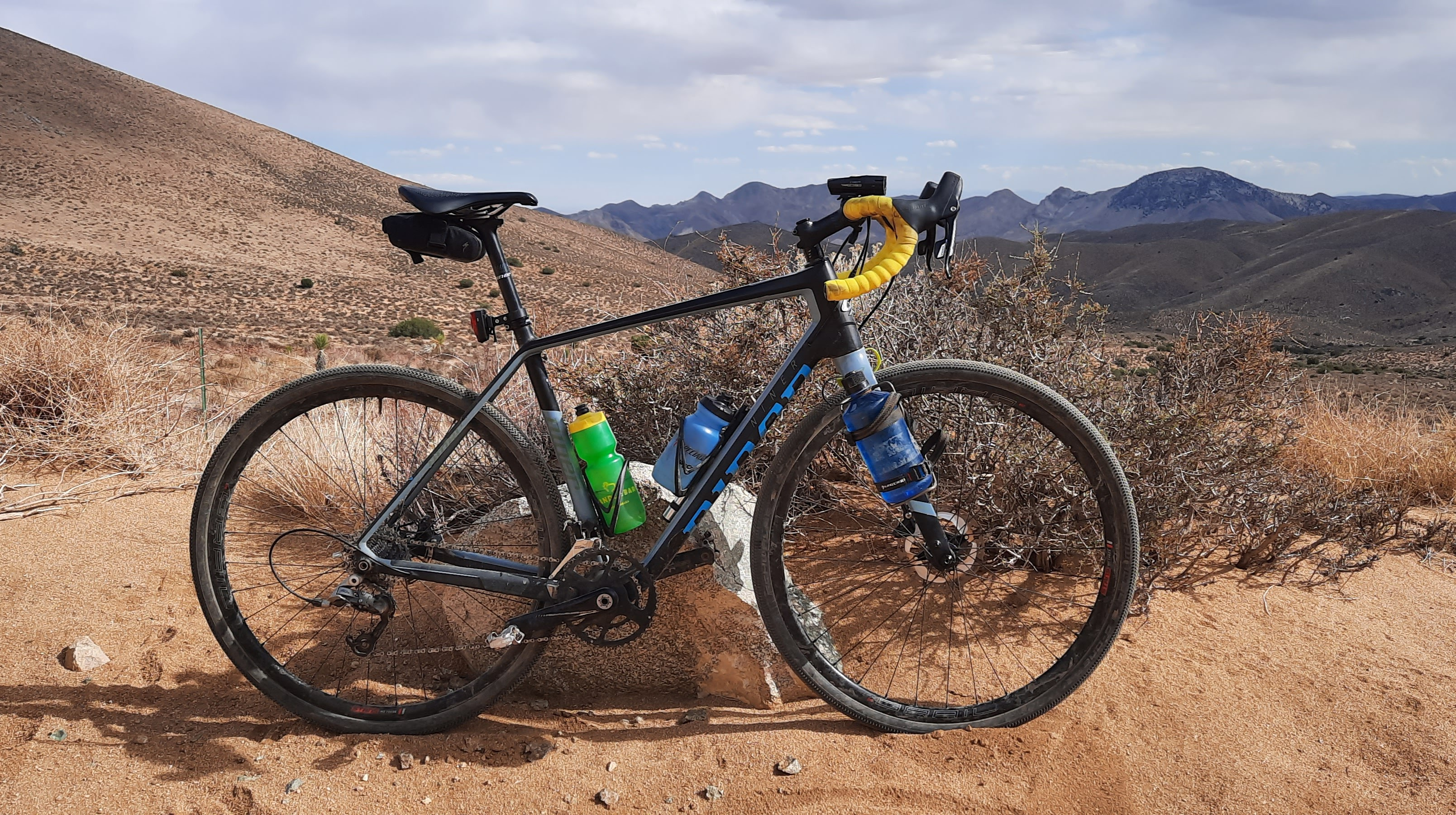
A Niner RLT 9 RDO gravel bike in the desert of California.

Niner is an American bicycle manufacturer headquartered in Fort Collins, Colorado, that specializes in 29er mountain bikes. The company also offers several models of cyclocross and adventure-touring bikes. The firm filed for bankruptcy in November 2017. In March 2018, the firm was acquired by United Wheels HK Ltd. (UWHK).

== History ==
Niner was founded in 2005 by Chris Sugai and Steve Domahidy. Since the company's inception, Niner has primarily focused on designing mountain bikes with 29” wheels (commonly referred to as "29ers" in the mountain biking community). Niner's first bike was a scandium single-speed 29er.

As the popularity of 29er mountain bikes began to grow during the late-2000s and early-2010s, the Niner brand also began to grow. In 2011, the Niner bike company was recognized by Forbes (“List of America’s Most Promising Companies”). As of 2012, Niner bikes were designed in SolidWorks, and virtually tested and simulated using CATIA, including virtual strength and stress analysis. Manufacturing of Niner bikes takes place in Asia. The brand had more than 300 dealers across the United States and Niner bikes were sold in 40 countries.

Originally headquartered in California, Niner moved its primary base of operations to a 39,000-square-foot building in Fort Collins, Colorado, in 2016. In November 2017, Niner Inc. filed for Chapter 11 bankruptcy protection ahead of a planned acquisition by an investor group. Several months later, in March 2018, Niner announced they had been acquired by UWHK Ltd., a Hong Kong–based investment firm known for owning Huffy Corp.

In 2026 United Wheels announced they were "pausing" the Niner brand and closing its Fort Collins location. They have stated that warranties will continue to be supported despite the pause.
