= 48th Air Transport Squadron =

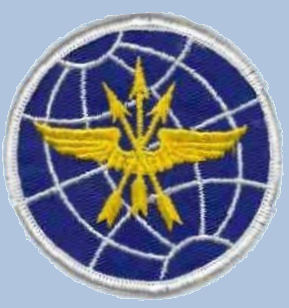
48th Air Transport Squadron

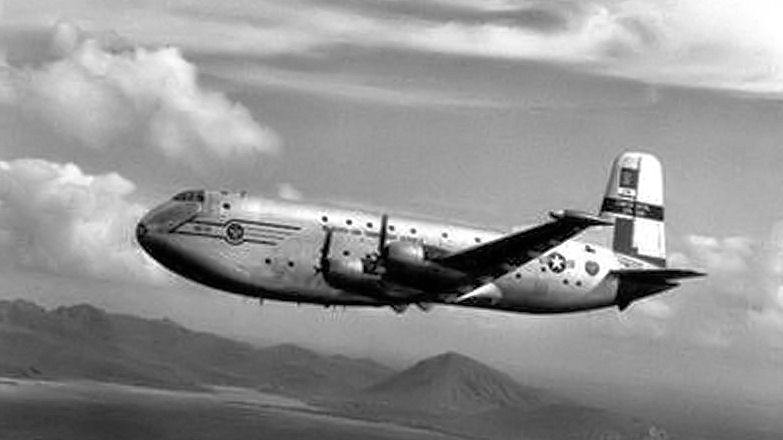
- C-124 Globemaster II over Hawaii about 1957
- Active: 1942-1943; 1952-1965
- Country: United States
- Branch: United States Air Force
- Role: Airlift
- Part of: Military Air Transport Service
- Motto(s): Forever Forward

Insignia
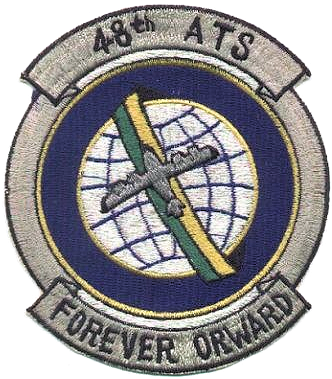
- Patch with 48th Air Transport Squadron emblem

The 48th Air Transport Squadron is an inactive United States Air Force unit. Its last was assigned to the 1502d Air Transport Wing, Military Air Transport Service, stationed at Hickam Air Force Base, Hawaii. It was inactivated on 25 June 1965.

== History ==
The squadron was first organized during World War II as a ferrying squadron in the Mediterranean Theater of Operations.

Reestablished as the 48th Air Transport Squadron in 1952 to replace the 1264th Air Transport Squadron, which had been organized in 1948 as the 2d Air Transport Squadron, a Douglas C-54 Skymaster transport squadron. That squadron was redesignated on 1 October 1948 to comply with the requirement that Table of Distribution units be numbered with four digits.

Upgraded to Boeing C-97 Stratofreighter and Douglas C-124 Globemaster II long distance intercontinental transports. Flew over MATS Pacific routes from Hawaii until inactivated in 1965 with the phaseout of the C-124.

=== Lineage ===
- Constituted as the 48th Ferrying Squadron

Activated c. 9 July 1942
Redesignated 48th Transport Squadron c. 29 March 1943

- Disbanded on 20 September 1943
- Reconstituted as the 48th Air Transport Squadron, Heavy on 20 June 1952

Activated on 20 July 1952

- Redesignated 48th Air Transport Squadron, Medium on 1 April 1960

Discontinued and inactivated on 25 June 1965

=== Assignments ===
- 14th Ferrying Group, c. 9 July 1942 – 20 September 1943
- 1500th Air Transport Group (later 1502d Air Transport Group), 20 July 1952
- 1502d Air Transport Wing, 1 May 1958 - 20 Jul 1952

=== Stations ===
- Bathurst, Gambia, c. 9 July 1942
- Marrakech, French Morocco, c. February 1943 – 20 September 1943
- Hickam Air Force Base, Hawaii, 20 July 1952 - 25 June 1965

=== Aircraft ===
- Douglas C-54 Skymaster, 1948–1949
- Boeing C-97 Stratofreighter, 1949–1956
- Douglas C-118, 1956–1965
- Douglas C-124 Globemaster, 1955-1965
