= 49th Regiment =

49th Regiment or 49th Infantry Regiment may refer to:

- 49th Hutsul Rifle Regiment, a unit of the Polish Army
- 49th (Princess Charlotte of Wales's) (Hertfordshire) Regiment of Foot, a unit of the British Army
- 49th Royal Tank Regiment, a unit of the British Army
- 49th Field Artillery Regiment, RCA, a unit of the Canadian Army
- The Hastings and Prince Edward Regiment, a unit of the Canadian Army
- 49th Field Artillery Regiment (United States), a unit of the US Army
- 49th Infantry Regiment (United States), a unit of the US Army
- 49th Regiment of Bengal Native Infantry, a unit of the East India Company's Bengal Army

American Civil War regiments

Union (Northern) Army

- 49th Regiment Kentucky Volunteer Mounted Infantry
- 49th Illinois Volunteer Infantry Regiment
- 49th Wisconsin Volunteer Infantry Regiment
- 49th Indiana Infantry Regiment
- 49th New York Volunteer Infantry
- 49th Ohio Infantry
- 49th Pennsylvania Infantry

Confederate (Southern) Army

- 49th North Carolina Infantry
- 49th Virginia Infantry

== See also ==
- 49th Division (disambiguation)
- 49th Brigade (disambiguation)
- 49th Squadron (disambiguation)
