= 49th Rifle Division (RSFSR) =

- Red Army insignia of the Civil War period
- Active: 1st formation: June 1919–April 1920; 2nd formation: December 1920–April 1921
- Country: Russian Soviet Federated Socialist Republic
- Branch: Red Army
- Type: Infantry
- Engagements: Russian Civil War

The 49th Rifle Division (Russian: 49-я стрелковая дивизия) was an infantry division of the Red Army during the Russian Civil War, formed twice.

Formed in mid-1919 on the Eastern Front as the Orenburg Rifle Division, it was soon redesignated as the 49th Rifle Division. It fought in the defeat of White troops in west Kazakhstan and on the southern Ural River. In early 1920 it was transferred west to the North Caucasus and participated in the offensive that defeated the Armed Forces of South Russia, before being disbanded. A second formation was formed in December 1920 as the 20th Rifle Division of the Internal Service Troops and redesignated as the 49th in March 1921, but itself disbanded in April.

== History ==
=== First formation ===
The division was formed by orders of 17 June 1919 with the 1st Army of the Eastern Front as the Orenburg Rifle Division from the units defending Orenburg against the White Eastern Front of Alexander Kolchak. It was renumbered as the 49th Rifle Division on 5 July, and fought in the Aktyubinsk operation between 14 August and 14 September, during which it advanced as part of the Orenburg group, fighting near Akbulak, Aktyubinsk, and Orsk and on the Ik and Utva Rivers. In accordance with a 16 September order of the Turkestan Front and 18 and 21 September orders of the 1st Army, the 49th was renamed the 49th Fortress Division and subordinated to the Orenburg Fortified Region.

The 1st and 3rd Brigades of the division joined the newly formed Iletsk group of forces on 8 October. From 2 November to 10 January 1920, they fought in the Uralsk–Guryev Operation, advancing in the area of Iletsk with the Iletsk shock group. Both brigades transferred to the 4th Army of the Eastern Front on 1 December, followed by the remainder of the division on 4 December. On 12 January the division transferred to the 11th Army of the Caucasian Front, fighting in the North Caucasus operation against the remnants of the Armed Forces of South Russia until 7 April. During the operation, the division advanced towards Stavropol, in the area of Yessentukhi, and the stanitsa of Razdolny. After the defeat of the Armed Forces of South Russia, the 49th was disbanded on 21 April, with its personnel used to reinforce the 20th Rifle Division.

=== Second formation ===
The 20th Rifle Division of the Internal Service Troops (VNUS) was formed in accordance with 1 and 15 December 1920 orders of the Transvolga Military District. From January to April it protected food supplies and fought insurgents in Samara and Orenburg Governorates. On 14 March 1921 the division was redesignated as the 49th Rifle Division in accordance with the transfer of VNUS troops to the Red Army on 4 March. The headquarters of the 49th was quickly disbanded on 19 April, while its troops became the 145th and 148th Rifle Brigades.

== Commanders ==
The following commanders led the division:

- Gaspar Voskanov (17 June–16 September 1919)
- P. Yulin (acting; 16 September–3 October 1919, 17 November–9 December 1919)
- Nikolai Kashirin (3 October–17 November 1919)
- Denisov (9 December 1919–4 January 1920)
- V.I. Popovich (acting, 4 January–21 April 1920)
