= 49th Air Transport Squadron =

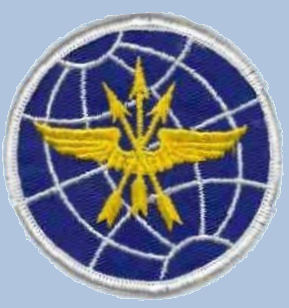
49th Air Transport Squadron
- Active: 1942-1943; 1952-1955
- Country: United States
- Branch: United States Air Force
- Role: Airlift
- Engagements: Mediterranean Theater of Operations

Insignia
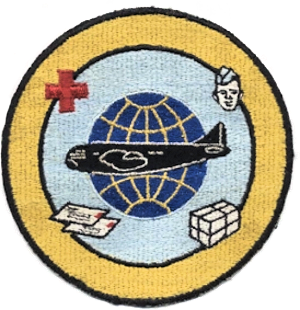
- Patch with 49th Air Transport Squadron emblem

The 49th Air Transport Squadron is an inactive United States Air Force unit. Its last assignment was as part of the 1502d Air Transport Wing, Military Air Transport Service, stationed at Hickam Air Force Base, Hawaii. It was inactivated on 1 July 1955.

== History ==
Activated as a ferrying unit during World War II, it served in the Mediterranean Theater of Operations until disbanded in 1943 and replaced by Station 10, North African Wing, Air Transport Command.

Reestablished in 1952 to replace the 1265th Air Transport Squadron, which had been organized on 1 June 1949 as a medium transport squadron flying Douglas C-54 Skymasters, it transported supplies and personnel in the Pacific from Hawaii to the Philippines and bases in between. It deployed elements of the squadron to Tachikawa Air Base, Japan during 1951–1952, flying combat resupply missions during the Korean War.

After the Korean War, it returned to normal peacetime operations. It was inactivated simultaneously with the host 1500th ATW in July 1955.

=== Lineage ===
- Constituted as the 49th Ferrying Squadron

Activated c. 9 July 1942

- Redesignated 49th Transport Squadron, c. 29 March 1943
- Disbanded on 20 September 1943

Reconstituted as the 49th Air Transport Squadron, Medium on 20 June 1952
Activated on 20 July 1952
Inactivated on 1 July 1955

=== Assignments ===
- 14th Ferrying Group, c. 9 July 1942
- African-Middle East Wing, Air Transport Command, 1943 – 20 September 1943
- 1500th Air Transport Group, 20 July 1952 - 1 July 1955

=== Stations ===
- Bathurst, Gambia, c. 9 July 1942
- Marrakech, French Morocco, c. February 1943 – 20 September 1943
- Hickam Air Force Base Hawaii, 20 July 1952 - 1 July 1955

=== Aircraft ===
- C-54 Skymaster, 1949–1952
- C-97 Stratofreighter, 1952–1955
