= 50th Military Airlift Squadron =

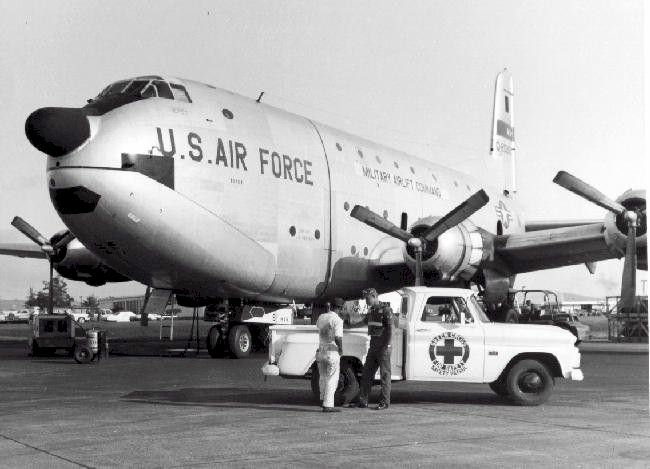
- Douglas C-124 Globemaster II on the flightline
- Active: 1942–1944; 1952–1969
- Country: United States
- Branch: United States Air Force
- Role: Airlift
- Motto: Transportatio Certe in Caelo (Latin for 'Sure Transportation in the Skies')

Insignia
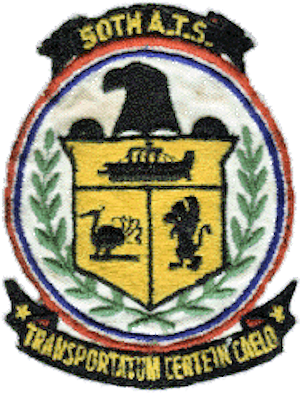
- Patch with 50th Air Transport Squadron emblem

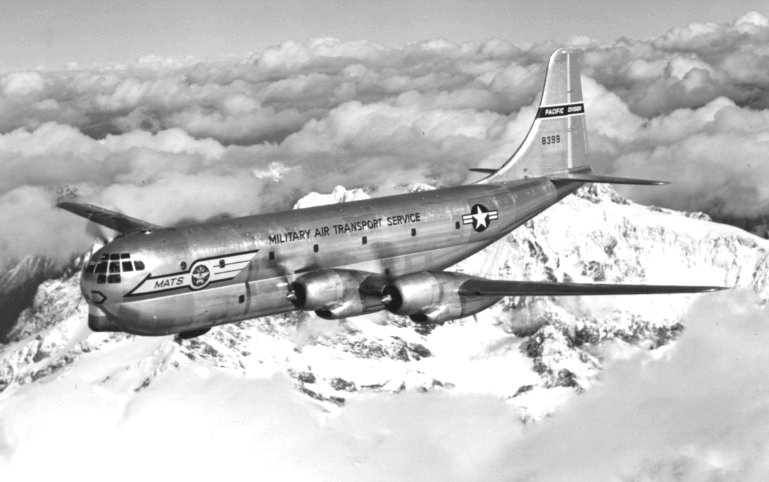
Boeing C-97A Stratofreighter 48-399 in flight

The 50th Military Airlift Squadron is an inactive United States Air Force unit. Its last assignment was to the 1502d Air Transport Wing, Military Air Transport Service, at Hickam Air Force Base, Hawaii, where it was inactivated on 22 December 1969.

== History ==
Replaced the 1266th Air Transport Squadron, which had been established in 1949 as a medium transport squadron flying Douglas C-54 Skymasters, it transported supplies and personnel in the Pacific between Hawaii and the Philippines and bases in-between. It received long distance Boeing C-97 Stratofreighters and intercontinental Douglas C-124 Globemaster IIs in the 1950s and was part of the Military Air Transport Service worldwide network of transport units. It flew routes between India and the West Coast of the United States, Alaska and Japan.

It was reassigned to the 61st Military Airlift Wing in 1966 when its parent 1502d Air Transport Wing was inactivated.

== Lineage ==
- Constituted as the 50th Ferrying Squadron (Special)

Activated c. 1 August 1942

- Redesignated 50th Transition Training Squadron on 4 June 1943

Disbanded on 31 March 1944

- Reconstituted on 20 June 1952 as the 50th Air Transport Squadron, Heavy

Activated on 20 July 1952
Redesignated 50th Military Airlift Squadron on 8 January 1966
Inactivated on 22 December 1969

=== Assignments ===
- 1st Operational Training Unit, c. 1 August 1942 – 31 March 1944
- 1500th Air Transport Group (later 1502d Air Transport Group), 20 July 1952
- 1502d Air Transport Wing, 1 May 1958
- 61st Military Airlift Wing 8 January 1966 – 22 December 1969 (not operational after 1 December 1969)

=== Stations ===
- Rosecrans Field, Missouri, c. 1 August 1942 – 31 March 1944
- Hickam Air Force Base, Hawaii, 20 July 1952 – 22 December 1969

=== Aircraft ===
- Douglas C-54 Skymaster, 1949–1952
- Boeing C-97 Stratofreighter, 1952–1955
- Douglas C-124 Globemaster II, 1955–1966
