= 49th Street =

49th Street may refer to:

- 49th Street (Manhattan), a street in Manhattan
- 49th Street (BMT Broadway Line), a New York City Subway station
- 49th Street station (SEPTA Regional Rail), a SEPTA Regional Rail station in Philadelphia, Pennsylvania
- 49th Street station (SEPTA Routes 11 and 36), a SEPTA trolley stop on Woodland Avenue in Philadelphia, Pennsylvania
- 49th Street station (SEPTA Route 13), a SEPTA trolley stop on Chester Avenue in Philadelphia, Pennsylvania
- 49th Street station (SEPTA Route 34), a SEPTA trolley stop on Baltimore Avenue in Philadelphia, Pennsylvania
