= 1502d Air Transport Wing =

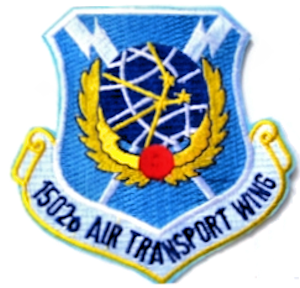
- Emblem of the 1501st Air Transport Wing
- Active: 1955–1966
- Country: United States
- Branch: United States Air Force
- Type: Airlift
- Part of: Military Air Transport Service
- Garrison/HQ: Hickam AFB, Hawaii

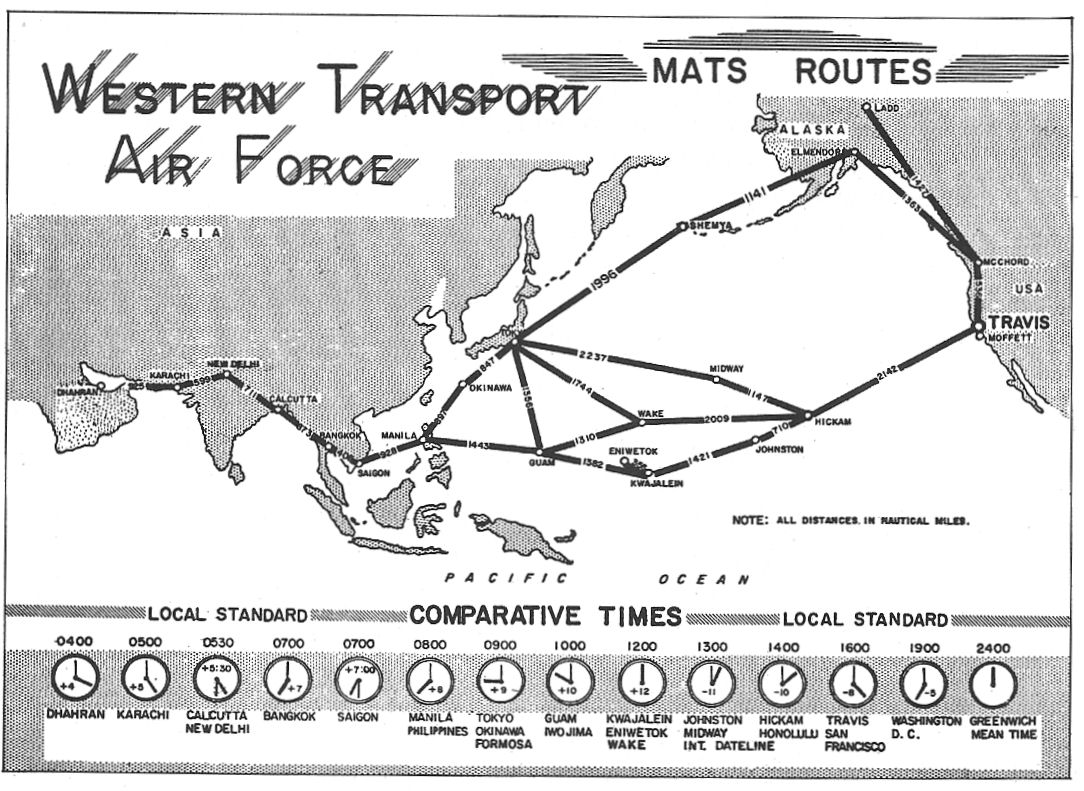
Route map of the Western Transport Air Force, 1964. The 1502d ATW operated primarily within this AOR.

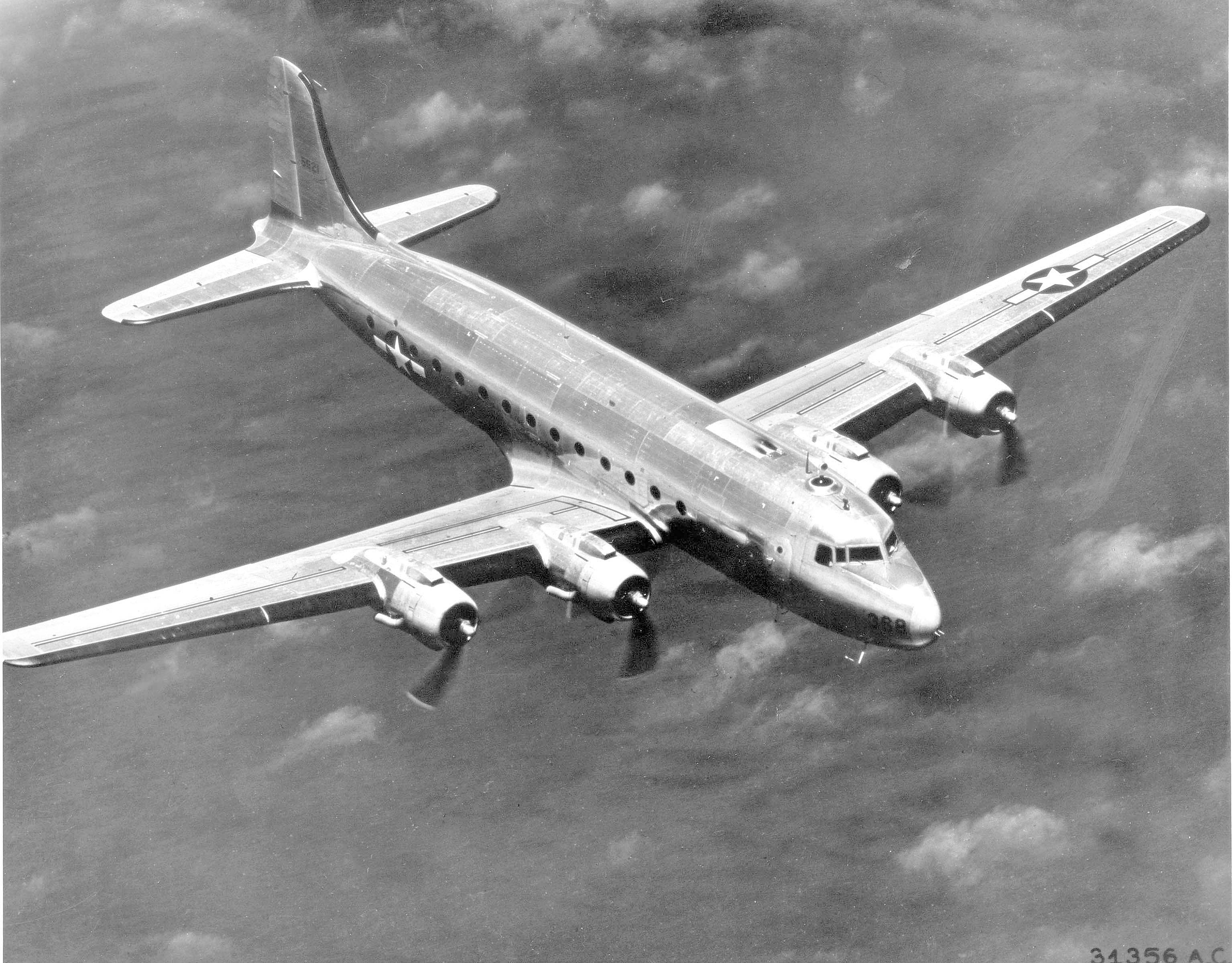
Douglas C-54 Skymaster

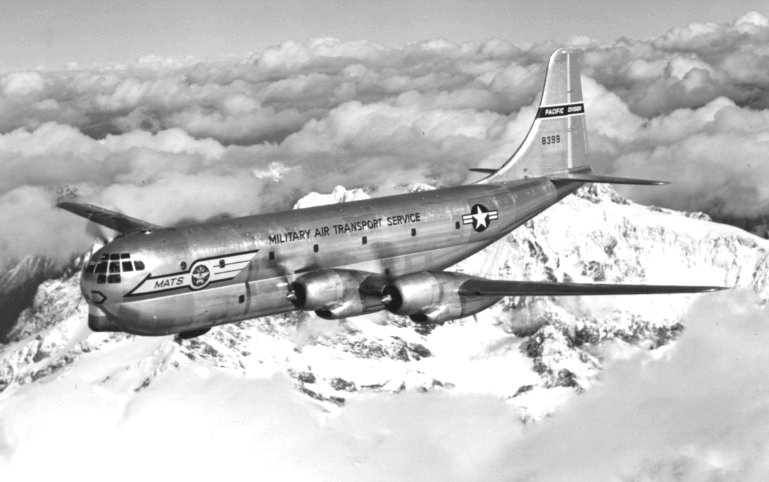
C-97 Stratofreighter

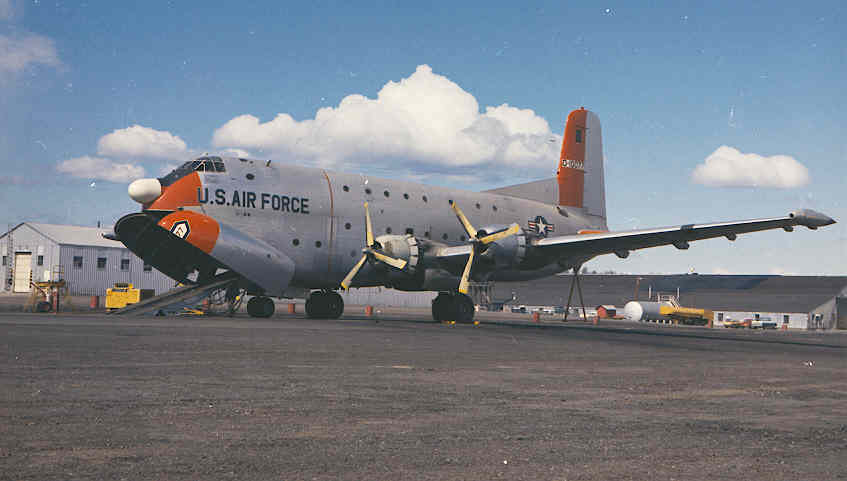
C-124 Globemaster II

The 1502d Air Transport Wing is a discontinued United States Air Force unit, last assigned to Western Transport Air Force in January 1966. The 1502d ATW was a heavy cargo transport wing of the Military Air Transport Service (MATS), formed at Hickam AFB on 1 July 1955.

== History ==
The wing was organized in mid-1955 with five C-97 squadrons established; squadrons again redesignated as part of the Wing realignment. In 1955 two squadrons were upgraded to very heavy lift C-124 Globemaster II which gave the wing a worldwide airlift capability. Also beginning in 1955, the wing operated VC-97s for VIP/Special Air Mission flights supporting HQ Far East Air Force (Rear). later HQ Pacific Air Forces, 1957–1966.

The 1502d Air Transport Wing’s Rodeo team, commanded by Major Joe Lodrige, won the 1962 Military Air Transport Service Rodeo at Scott Air Force Base, Illinois. The C-124 team from Hickam Air Force Base, Hawaii, developed an airdrop system for the first active-duty competition. Several team members, including Lodrige, later served with the 89th Airlift Wing at Andrews Air Force Base, transporting senior civilian and military officials.

The wing assumed responsibility for aircraft and personnel of 1503d Air Transport Group at Tachikawa Air Base, Japan in 1964 when 1503d reduced from Wing to Group level. The 1503d was a support organization and had no flying units assigned despite its name. The wing remained flying worldwide transport missions with the Globemasters until 1966 when MATS was inactivated and the wing assets were transferred to the Military Airlift Command 61st Military Airlift Wing.

=== Major airlifts ===
- During the Taiwan Strait crisis of 1958, MATS flew 144 airlift trips to the Far East when the crisis arose in the Formosa Straits, supporting the move of a Tactical Air Command Composite Air Strike Force, and airlifting a squadron of F-104 Starfighters to Taiwan.
- MATS supported nuclear weapons testing at the Eniwetok Proving Ground by airlifting more than 14,000 tons of cargo and 13,000 personnel, as well as providing 1,100 of its own technical personnel.
- In February 1961, MATS participated in Long Pass, the first strategic deployment airlift exercise of its size to the Pacific. It used 132 aircraft to move a battle group of the Strategic Army Corps (STRAC) and equipment for a Tactical Air Command Composite Strike Force (CASF) to Clark Air Base, the Philippines, and back again.
- In February 1962, MATS used 120 airlift aircraft of all types in a similar exercise, Great Shelf, to Clark Air Base. This time it moved 2,300 Army paratroops of STRAC and 1,100 tons of their equipment over the 7,600-statute-mile (12,200 km) route.
- In 1962, Devastating 175 miles per hour (282 km/h) winds of Typhoon Karen had barely subsided when the first of 50 MATS jet and prop-driven aircraft began landing on the rain-soaked runways of Anderson Air Force Base, Guam, with relief supplies and equipment. MATS airlifted more than 970 tons of material – from huge electric generators to blankets and clothing. Returning aircraft evacuated more than 760 dependents and servicemen whose homes had been shattered by the island's most severe storm in recorded history.

== Lineage ==
=== 1502d Air Transport Group ===
- Designated as the 531st Air Transport Group, 14 May 1948

Organized 1 June 1948
Redesignated as 1500th Air Transport Group, 1 October 1948
Redesignated as 1502d Air Transport Group, 1 July 1955
Discontinued 15 May 1958

=== 1502d Air Transport Wing ===
- Designated and organized as the 1502d Air Transport Wing, 1 July 1955

Discontinued on 8 January 1966, personnel and equipment assigned to 61st Military Airlift Wing

=== Assignments ===
- Pacific Division, MATS, 1 July 1955
- Western Transport Air Force, (WESTAF), 1 July 1958
- Headquarters, Military Air Transport Service, 1–8 Jan 1966

=== Components ===
Groups

- 1502d Air Transport Group, 1 July 1955 – 15 May 1958

1st Air Transport Squadron (later 1263d Air Transport Squadron), 1 June 1948 – 17 June 1949
2d Air Transport Squadron (later 1264th Air Transport Squadron), 1 June 1948 – 1 June 1949
4th Air Transport Squadron (later 1265th Air Transport Squadron), 1 June 1948 – 23 April 1949
47th Air Transport Squadron, Medium, 20 Jul 1952 – 15 May 1958
48th Air Transport Squadron, Heavy, 20 July 1952 – 15 May 1958
49th Air Transport Squadron, Heavy, 20 July 1952 – 1 July 1955
50th Air Transport Squadron, Heavy, 20 July 1952 – 15 May 1958
51st Air Transport Squadron, 20 July 1952 – 1 July 1955
1263d Air Transport Squadron, 30 June 1949 – 20 July 1952

Elements deployed to Tachikawa Airfield, Japan during 1951–1952 flying combat resupply missions during Korean War

1264th Air Transport Squadron, 13 October 1949 – 20 July 1952
1266th Air Transport Squadron, 30 June 1949 – 20 July 1952
1267th Air Transport Squadron, 13 October 1949 – 24 May 1950
1268th Air Transport Squadron, 30 June 1949 – 20 July 1952
1283d Air Transport Squadron, 24 Oct 1951 – 1 Jun 1952
1284th Air Transport Squadron, 24 Oct 1951 – 1 Jun 1952

- 1503d Air Transport Group, 22 June 1964 – 8 January 1966

1503d Support Squadron (Transport), 22 June 1964 – 8 January 1966
At Tachikawa Air Base, Japan

Squadrons

- 6th Troop Carrier Squadron, 23 Jun 1965 – 8 Jan 1966
- 48th Air Transport Squadron, 15 May 1958 – 25 June 1965
- 50th Air Transport Squadron, 15 May 1958 – 8 January 1966
- 1453d Aeromedical Evacuation Squadron, Sep 1956 – 1 November 1965
- 1505th Support Squadron (Transport), 22 June 1964 – 8 January 1966

at Kadena AB, Okinawa

- 1506th Support Squadron (Transport), 22 June 1964 – 8 January 1966

at Clark AB, Philippines

- 1507th Support Squadron (Transport), 22 June 1964 – 8 January 1966

at Andersen AFB, Guam

- 1508th Support Squadron (Transport), 21 December 1965 – 8 January 1966

at Cam Rahn Bay, Viet Nam

- Naval Air Transport Squadron 8 (VR-8), attached 1 July 1955 – 5 September 1957
- Naval Air Transport Squadron 7 (VR-7), attached 1 Jul 1955 – 15 Aug 1957

=== Stations ===
- Hickam Air Force Base, Hawaii, 1 July 1955 – 8 January 1966

=== Aircraft ===
- C-97 Stratofreighter

47th, 48th, 49th, 50th, 51st Air Transport Squadrons, 1955

Note: 50th ATS operated a VC-97 version of Stratofreighter, 1951–1966 for VIP/Special Air Missions.

- C-118 Liftmaster

48th Air Transport Squadron, 195? -1965

- C-124 Globemaster II

50th Air Transport Squadron, 1955–1966
6th Troop Carrier Squadron, 1965–1966

- C-131 Samaritan

1453d Medical (later Aeromedical) Air Evacuation Squadron, 1956–1965
