= 61st Air Base Wing =

Inactive US Air Force wing

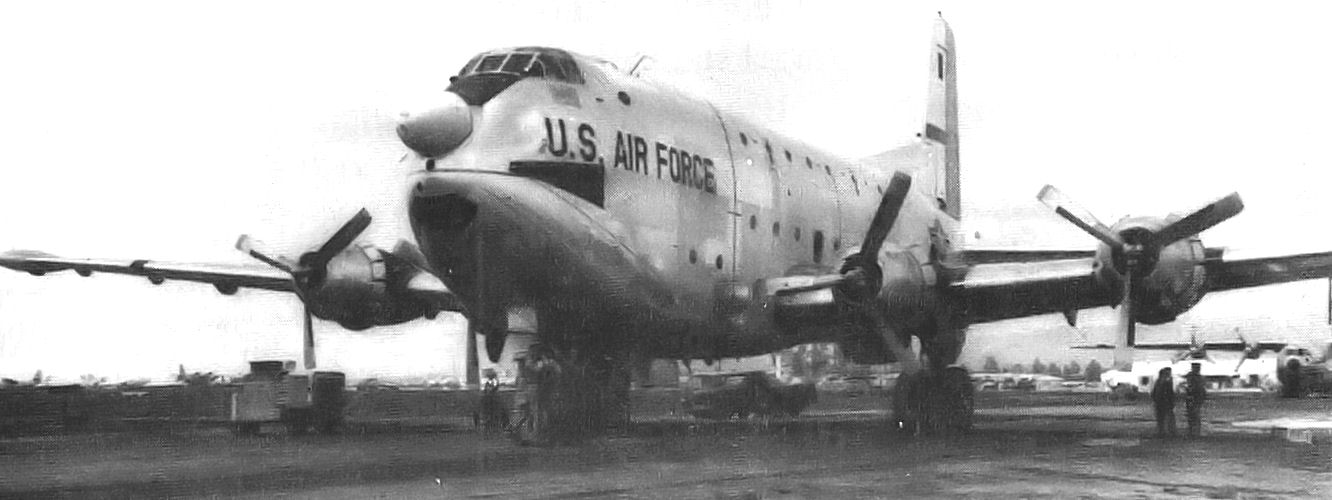
- C-124 Globemaster II at Hickam AFB in 1967
- Active: 1948–1951; 1966–1980; 1994–2010
- Country: United States
- Branch: United States Air Force
- Role: Base support
- Decorations: Air Force Outstanding Unit Award

Insignia
- 61st Air Base Wing emblem (Note: Approved 30 November 2006.)

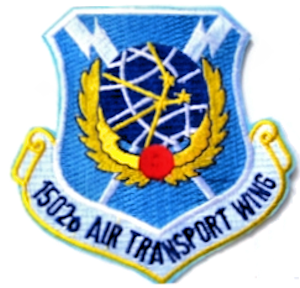
- 61st Military Airlift Wing emblem (Note: Approved 4 May 1966. The wing adopted this emblem from the 1502d Air Transport Wing. It is entitled to the history honors of the 1502d, but not its lineage.)

The 61st Air Base Wing is an inactive wing of the United States Air Force, last stationed at Los Angeles Air Force Base, El Segundo, California. The 61st was the host unit at Los Angeles Air Force Base, and commanded all the Air Force support groups to provide base operating support. When active, the wing was entitled to temporary bestowal of the history and honors stems of the 61st Troop Carrier Group.

The wing was inactivated in 2010 when its mission support group was redesignated the 61st Air Base Group and assumed the role of the base host, a mission that same organization still provides as Space Base Delta 3.

The wing originally operated in Europe from 1948 to 1951, including supporting the Berlin Airlift, and later for 14 years in Hawaii until 1980.

== History ==
The wing was first activated as the 61st Troop Carrier Wing by the United States Air Forces in Europe in 1948 to control C-47 Skytrain and C-54 Skymaster units. The wing was the host organization at Rhein-Main Air Base, West Germany. It also operated Tempelhof Air Base, in Occupied Berlin until 5 November 1948 and Tulln Air Base in the American Occupation Zone of Austria until 10 December 1948.

Its initial mission was to coordinate Berlin Airlift operations for USAFE in conjunction with units deployed from the United States and the Royal Air Force. With the end of Berlin Airlift operations in 1949, flew theater airlift missions within USAFE and participated in numerous exercises. With the outbreak of the Korean War in June 1950, wing deployed its operational component, the 61st Troop Carrier Group to Ashiya Air Base, Japan on 21 July 1950 to reinforce Far East Air Forces transport units and perform combat transport operations within South Korea and Japan. With the group deployed to Japan, the wing was inactivated in West Germany in June 1951.

The wing was reactivated as the 61st Military Airlift Wing at Hickam Air Force Base, Hawaii in 1966 under Military Airlift Command, replacing the discontinued Military Air Transport Service 1502d Air Transport Wing in January 1966. It "provided air transport and support functions for airlift operations in the entire Pacific Ocean area, Alaska to Antarctica, and the United States to Southeast Asia. It supported airlift, primarily in support of United States military forces in Southeast Asia during the Vietnam War." The Hickam Aerial Port was a primary destination for United States military personnel on rest and recreation leave from South Vietnam during the Vietnam War, the 61st operating the aerial port and coordinating flights by civilian contract airlines to and from bases in South Vietnam.

The wing's assigned airlift squadrons were inactivated in 1968 and 1969, after which became the 61st Military Airlift Support Wing for Military Airlift Command flights within Pacific Air Forces as well as Naval and Marine Transports supporting their respective organizations in Hawaii. It was inactivated 1 April 1980 and is equipment and most personnel being reassigned to the 834th Airlift Division.

On 1 August 2006, it was reactivated as the 61st Air Base Wing, a non-flying unit at Los Angeles Air Force Base under Air Force Space Command. It supported the Space and Missile Systems Center from 2006 to 2010, when it was inactivated and base support assigned to the 61st Air Base Group.

== Lineage ==
- Established as the 61st Troop Carrier Wing, Medium and activated on 1 July 1948

Redesignated 61st Troop Carrier Wing, Heavy on 15 August 1948
Inactivated on 2 June 1951

- Redesignated 61st Military Airlift Wing and activated on 27 December 1965 (not organized)

Organized on 8 January 1966
Redesignated 61st Military Airlift Support Wing on 22 December 1969
Inactivated 1 April 1980

- Redesignated 61st Air Base Wing on 20 June 2006

Activated on 1 August 2006
Inactivated on 30 July 2010

=== Assignments ===
- United States Air Forces in Europe, 1 July 1948

Attached to: Berlin Airlift Task Force until 29 July 1948
Attached to: Airlift Task Force (Provisional), 22 July - 4 November 1948
Attached to: 1st Air Lift Task Force, 5 November 1948 – 9 July 1949

- 1st Air Lift Task Force, 10 July 1949
- United States Air Forces in Europe, 26 September 1949
- Twelfth Air Force, 21 January-2 June 1951
- Military Air Transport Service, 27 December 1965 (not organized)
- Twenty-Second Air Force, 8 January 1966 – 1 April 1980
- Space and Missile Systems Center, 1 August 2006 - 30 July 2010

=== Components ===
Groups

- 60th Troop Carrier Group: attached 26 September 1949 – 2 June 1951
- 61st Air Base Group: 1 July 1948 - 2 June 1951
- 61st Maintenance & Supply Group: 1 July 1948 – 2 June 1951
- 61st Station Medical Group (later 61st Medical Group): 1 July 1948 – 2 June 1951, 1 August 2006 – 30 July 2010
- 61st Troop Carrier Group (later 61st Military Airlift Group, 61st Air Base Group, 61st Mission Support Group): 1 July 1948 – 1 January 1951 (attached to 1st Airlift Task Force 5 November 1948, Airlift Wing (Provisional) 20 November 1948, 7497th Airlift Wing 10 January 1949 – 9 July 1949, Military Air Transport Service 21 July 1950, North Pacific Wing (Provisional) 26 July 1950, 1705th Air Transport Wing 24 August 1950, Far East Air Force Combat Cargo Command (Provisional) 10 December 1950 – 1 January 1951); 1 August 2006 – 30 July 2010
- 65th Military Airlift Group (later 65th Military Airlift Support Group): 8 January 1966 – 1 January 1972
- 513th Troop Carrier Group: attached 10 July - 16 October 1949
- 1422d Air Transport Group, Provisional: attached 2 August - 5 November 1948
- 7350th Air Base Group: 1 July 1948 – 5 November 1948

Tempelhof Central Airport, Berlin

- 7360th Air Base Group: 1 July 1948 – 10 December 1948

Tulln Air Base, Austria

- C-54 Troop Carrier Group, Provisional: attached 1 July - 2 August 1948

Squadrons

- 6th Military Airlift Squadron: 8 January 1966 – 8 June 1968 (not operational after 16 May 1968)
- 50th Military Airlift Squadron: 8 January 1966 – 22 December 1969 (not operational after 1 December 1969)
- 6th Aerial Port Squadron: 1 March 1975 – 1 June 1975
- 61st Aerial Port Squadron: 8 January 1966 – 22 December 1969
- 602d Military Airlift Support Squadron: 8 January 1966 – 1 November 1975

Elmendorf Air Force Base, Alaska

- 603d Military Airlift Support Squadron: 8 January 1966 – 8 July 1966, 1 January 1972 – 1 April 1980

Kadena Air Base, Okinawa

- 604th Military Airlift Support Squadron: 8 January 1966 – 8 July 1966, 1 January 1972 – 1 June 1975

Clark Air Base, Philippines

- 605th Military Airlift Support Squadron: 8 January 1966 – 8 July 1966, 1 August 1972 – 1 April 1980

Andersen Air Force Base, Guam

- 606th Military Airlift Support Squadron: 8 January 1966 – 8 July 1966

Mactan Island Airfield, Philippines

- 607th Military Airlift Support Squadron: 8 January 1966 – 1 October 1980

Naval Air Facility Midway

- 608th Military Airlift Support Squadron: 8 January 1966 – 8 July 1966, 1 January 1972 – 30 April 1972

Cam Ranh Air Base, South Vietnam

- 610th Military Airlift Support Squadron: 1 January 1972 – 1 October 1978

Yokota Air Base, Japan

- 611th Military Airlift Support Squadron: 1 January 1972 – 1 October 1978

Osan Air Base, South Korea

- 616th Military Airlift Support Squadron: 8 January 1966 – 8 July 1966, 1 January 1972 – 26 March 1973

Tan Son Nhut Air Base, South Vietnam
Detachment 1 Phu Cat Air Base, South Vietnam
Detachment 2 Bien Hoa Air Base, South Vietnam

- 617th Military Airlift Support Squadron: 8 January 1966 – 8 July 1966, 1 January 1972 – 1 October 1972

Da Nang Air Base, South Vietnam
Detachment 1 Pleiku Air Base, South Vietnam

- 618th Military Airlift Support Squadron: 1 January 1972 – 1 June 1975

U-Tapao Royal Thai Navy Airfield, Thailand

- 619th Military Airlift Support Squadron: 22 December 1969 – 30 April 1972

Det D, later Det 2, Christchurch International Airport, New Zealand

Military Airlift Support Squadrons were support units that had no aircraft of its own, but rather supported the forward operations of aircraft from other MAC units, principally from the CONUS. Furthermore, the support squadron was a consolidation of all the operations and maintenance functions that state-side airlift wings had organized as separate units.

=== Stations ===
- Rhein-Main Air Force Base (later Rhein-Main Air Base), Germany (later West Germany), 1 July 1948 – 2 June 1951
- Hickam Air Force Base, Hawaii, 8 January 1966 – 1 April 1980
- Los Angeles Air Force Base, California, 1 August 2006 – 30 July 2010

=== Aircraft ===
- Primarily C-47, 1948, C-54, 1948, 1949–1950; and C-82, 1949–1951; but also flew (in single or small numbers) B-17, 1948–1949
- C-47 Skytrain, 1949–1951
- C-119 Flying Boxcar, August 1950
- C-54 Skymaster, 1951
- C-121 Constellation, 1966
- C-124 Globemaster II, 1966–1969

== Notes ==
Explanatory notes

Citations

== Bibliography ==
- Ravenstein, Charles A. (1984). Air Force Combat Wings, Lineage & Honors Histories 1947-1977. Washington, DC: Office of Air Force History. ISBN 0-912799-12-9.
