= 49th Division =

49th Division or 49th Infantry Division may refer to:

== Infantry divisions ==
=== Germany ===
- 49th Reserve Division (German Empire)
- 49th Infantry Division (Wehrmacht), Germany

=== Russia and Soviet Union ===
- 49th Infantry Division (Russian Empire)
- 49th Rifle Division (disambiguation), several divisions in Russia and the Soviet Union

=== Others ===
- 49th Division (1st Formation) (People's Republic of China), 1949–1950
- 49th Infantry Division "Parma", Kingdom of Italy
- 49th Division (Imperial Japanese Army), Japanese Burma Area Army
- 49th (West Riding) Infantry Division, United Kingdom
- 49th Infantry Division (United States)

== Other uses ==
- 49th Air Division, United States
- 49th Armored Division, United States

== See also ==
- List of military divisions by number
- 49th Brigade (disambiguation)
- 49th Regiment (disambiguation)
- 49th Squadron (disambiguation)
