= 49th Brigade =

49th Brigade or 49th Infantry Brigade may refer to:

== Germany ==
- 49th Landwehr Brigade

== India ==
- 49th Indian Brigade of the British Indian Army in the First World War
- 49th Indian Infantry Brigade of the British Indian Army in the Second World War

== Russia/Soviet Union ==
- 49th Anti-Aircraft Missile Brigade

== Spain ==
- 49th Mixed Brigade, a unit of the Spanish Republican Army

== Ukraine ==
- 49th Artillery Brigade (Ukraine)
- 49th Demining Brigade

== United Kingdom ==
- 49th Brigade (United Kingdom), a World War I formation of the British Army
- 49th Infantry Brigade (United Kingdom), a Cold War formation of the British Army

=== Artillery brigades ===
- 49th (Howitzer) Brigade, Royal Field Artillery
- 49th (West Riding) Trench Mortar Brigade, Royal Field Artillery

== United States ==
- 49th Military Police Brigade (United States)

== See also ==
- 49th Division (disambiguation)
- 49th Regiment (disambiguation)
- 49th Squadron (disambiguation)
