= Hedding =

Hedding may refer to:

- Hedding, New Jersey, an unincorporated area within Mansfield Township
- Hedding College, a former college in Abingdon, Illinois

== People with the surname ==
- Elijah Hedding (1780–1852), American bishop
- Malcolm Hedding (born 1952), South African activist
