= Qalandia checkpoint =

Primary checkpoint between the West Bank and Jerusalem

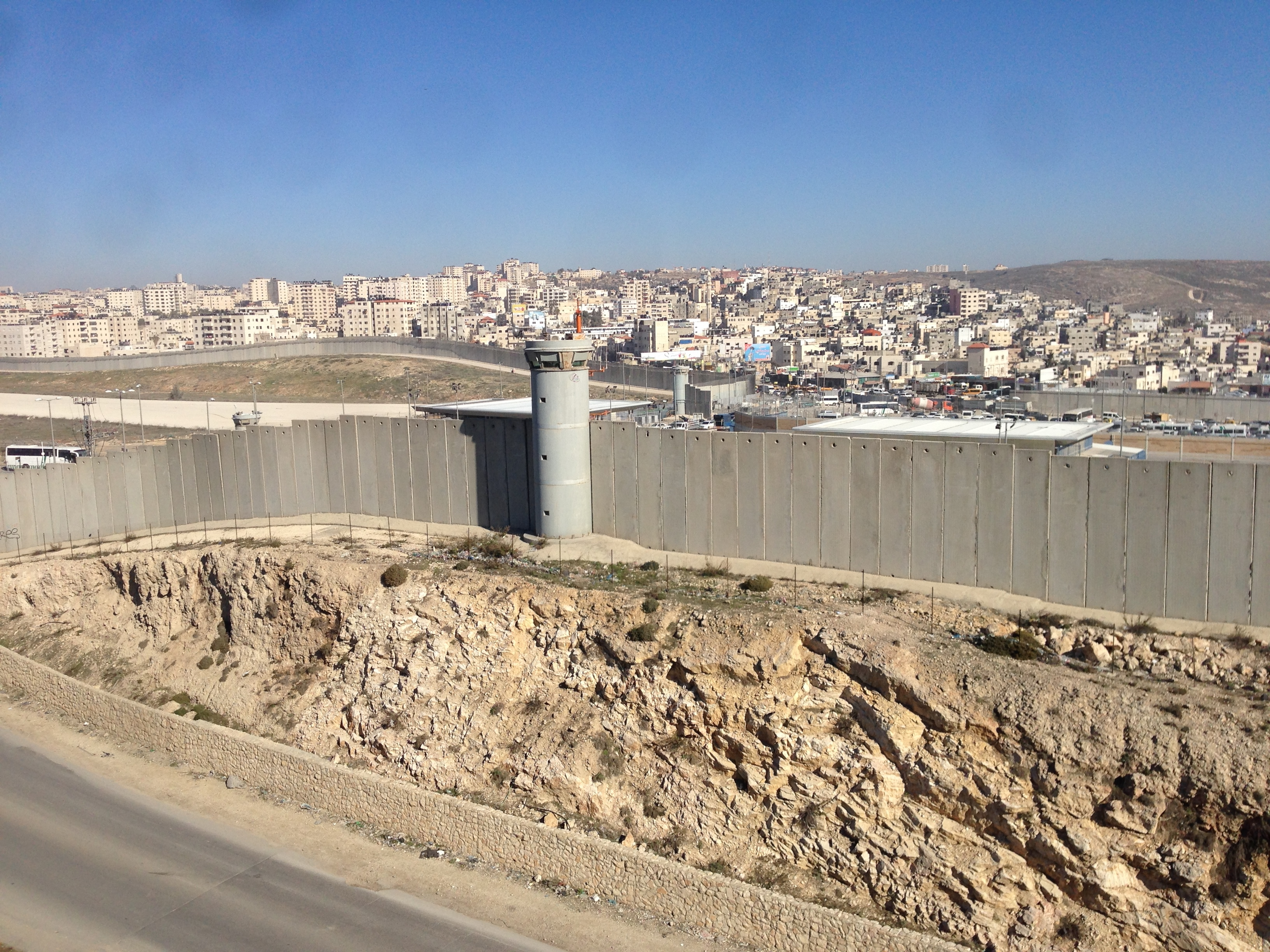
- Israeli watchtowers and wall at the checkpoint of the Palestinian refugee camp of Qalandia, 2014

Location
- Location: Boundary of East Jerusalem
- Coordinates: 31.862°N 35.228°E

Details
- Opened: 2001; 25 years ago
- Operated by: Israel Defence Forces

Qalandia checkpoint (Note: Sometimes written in English as Kalandia or Qalandiya) (Arabic: حاجز قلنديا, Hebrew: מעבר קלנדיה) is the primary Israeli checkpoint run by the Israel Defense Forces (IDF) between the northern West Bank and Jerusalem. It is known for frequent demonstrations against the Israeli occupation.

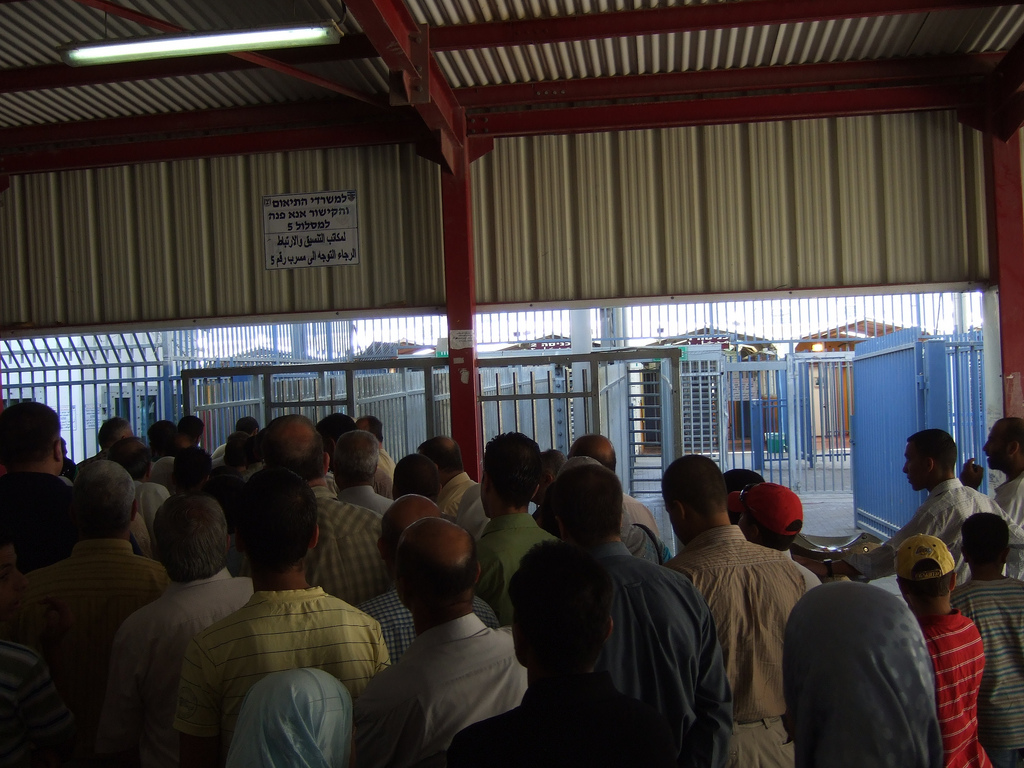
The Qalandia checkpoint between Jerusalem and Ramallah is known for frequent demonstrations against Israel.

The IDF uses the checkpoint to control Palestinian access to East Jerusalem and Israel. Israel requires Palestinians to have permits to pass through the checkpoint to East Jerusalem and Israel for their work, medical care, education or for religious reasons. According to B'Tselem, most of the people who use the checkpoint are residents of East Jerusalem separated from the city by the Israeli West Bank barrier.

== Location ==
The checkpoint is located near Qalandia village and built into the West Bank barrier, and restricts access between northeast Jerusalem and Ramallah–and, as such, between East Jerusalem and the northern West Bank. The entirety of the checkpoint structure is within the State of Palestine, east of the Green Line, in the Ramallah and al-Bireh Governorate. Highway 60 goes through the checkpoint.

== Operations ==
Palestinian travelers moving through the checkpoint are required to have a permit and a magnetic biometric card.

As with other checkpoints leading to Jerusalem, Qalandia checkpoint sees an increase in traffic during Muslim holidays, as Muslims seek to enter the Old City of Jerusalem and visit the Dome of the Rock or the Al-Aqsa mosque.

Also like other checkpoints, Qalandia checkpoint is prone to unpredictable closures and changes in the conditions that determine whether a person is allowed or denied the right to pass into Jerusalem. Sometimes a violent incident at one checkpoint will result in the IDF closing other checkpoints.

Street vendors and beggars, both adults and children, often gather on the Palestinian side of the checkpoint, hoping to make some money. Some set up booths or carts to sell goods such as produce or prepared foods.

== History ==
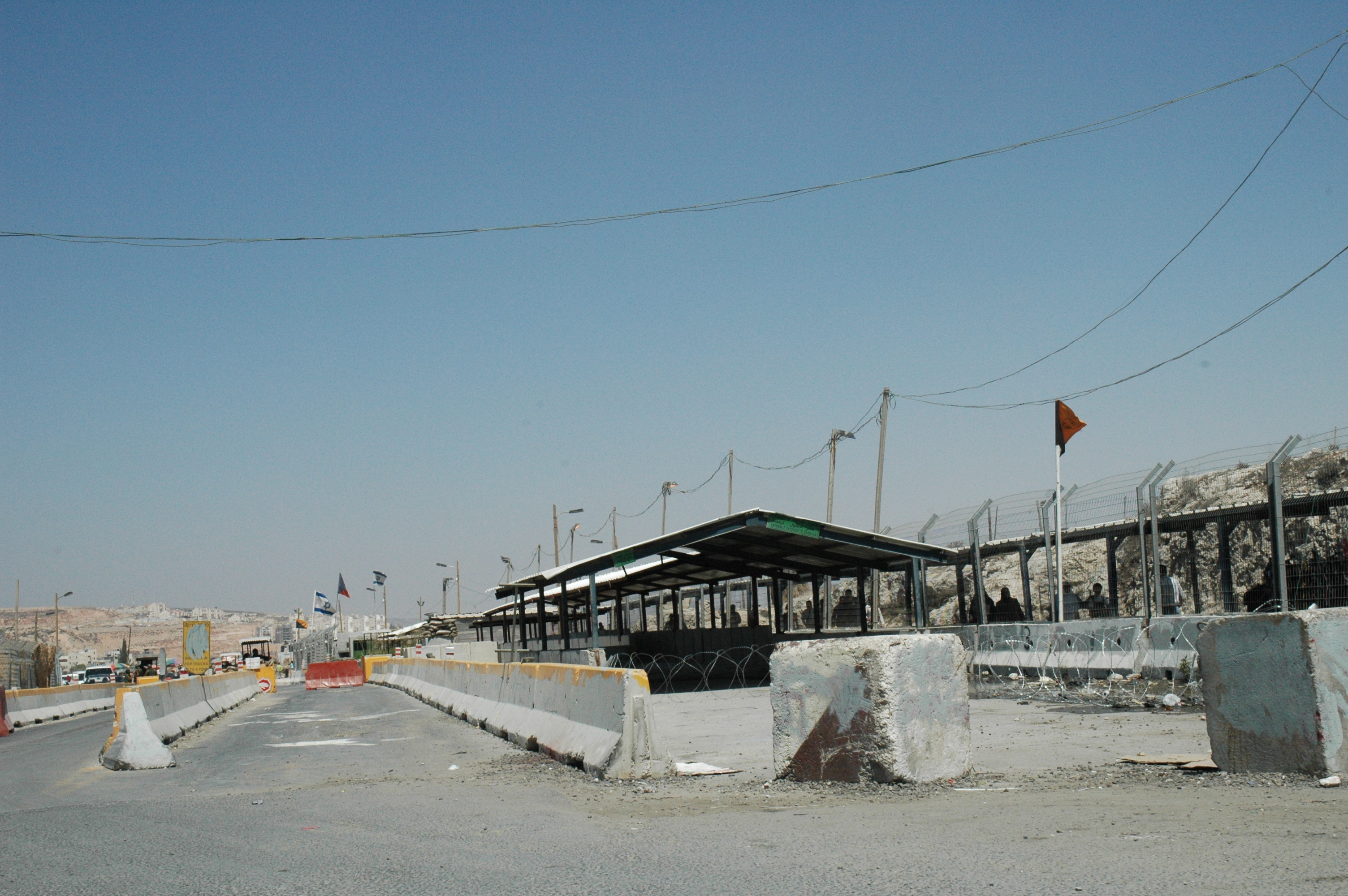
Qalandia checkpoint, August 2004

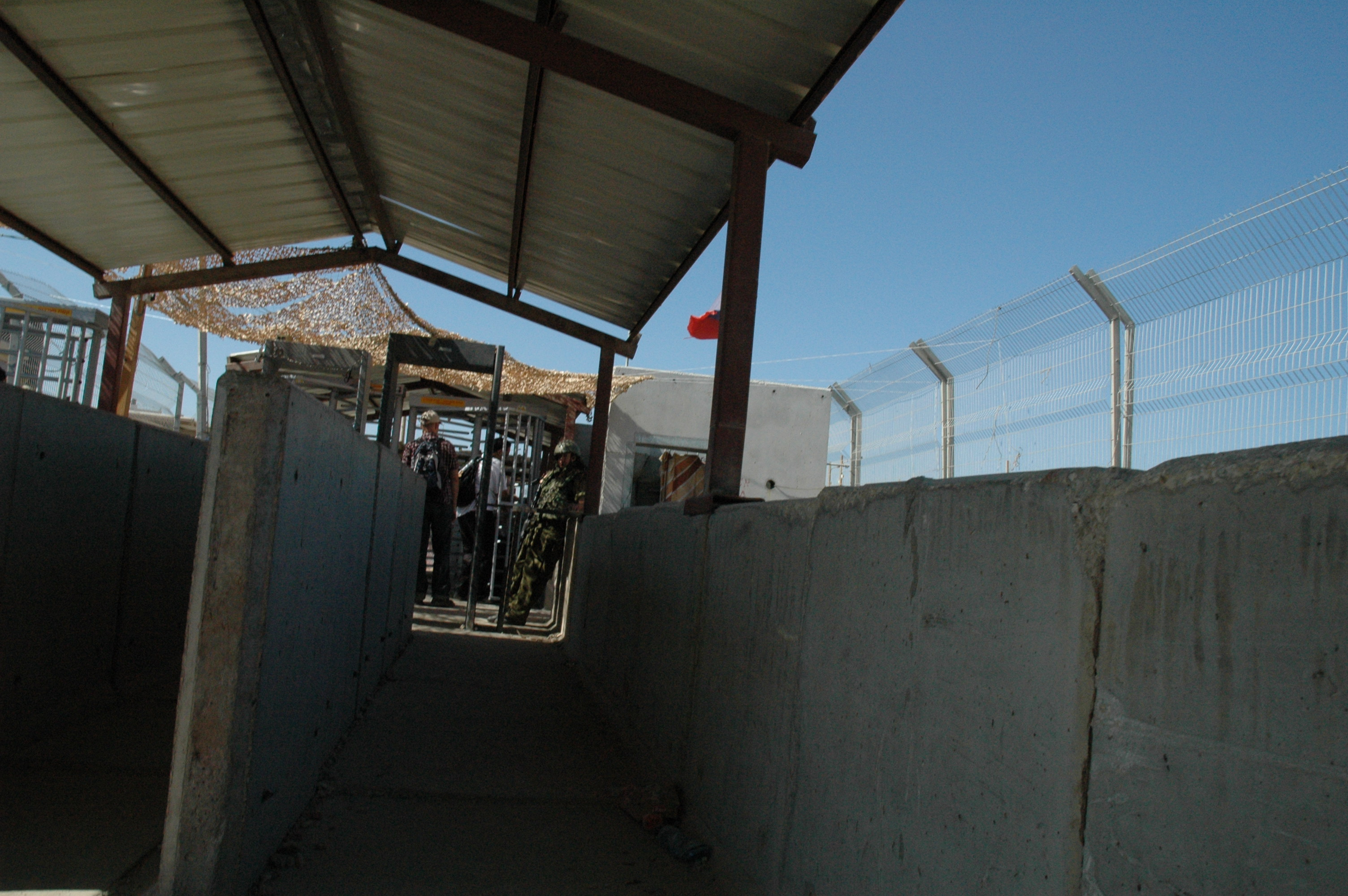
Checkpoint entrance, August 2004

Qalandia checkpoint was established in 2001, a few months into the Second Intifada. Originally it was a temporary military installation, with soldier stations and a fenced corridor. Over time, elements like a stone kiosk, a watchtower, and a roof were added, and eventually the construction of a permanent checkpoint building and nearby walls were completed in 2005. Prior to 2019, the building did not have air conditioning.

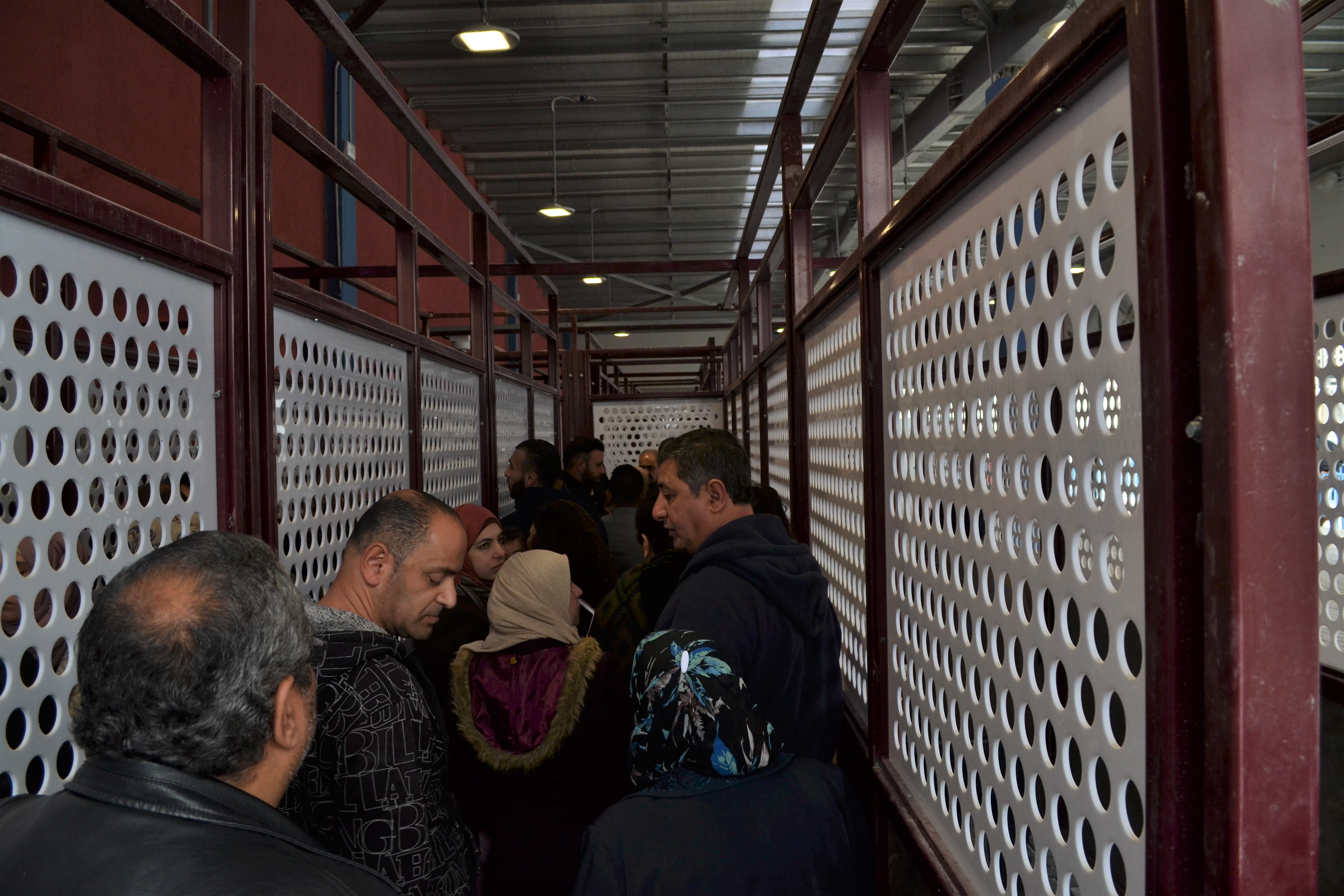
Qalandia checkpoint corridor, February 2019

In 2007, Palestinian artist Khaled Jarrar held an art exhibition at Qalandia and several other checkpoints, as well as at the International Academy of Art Palestine. The show featured photos of Palestinian life and Palestinians' experiences at checkpoints. He commented on the show at Qalandia, saying, “I want to show people our tragedy through my art, the reality of the daily humiliation we suffer, how old people, women and children are treated at the checkpoints. This is my form of nonviolence [sic] resistance.”

In 2019, several checkpoints–including Qalandia checkpoint, Huwara checkpoint, and Checkpoint 300–underwent renovations. Biometric sensors were added, partly to relieve long wait times and overcrowding issues.

In early 2021, during the second year of the COVID-19 pandemic, some Palestinians received vaccinations for COVID-19 at a Magen David Adom pop-up clinic at the checkpoint. However, at subsequent vaccination events some people were not vaccinated due to confusion and changing standards; Palestinian Americans were denied the vaccine explicitly because they had Palestinian documents rather than exclusively American or dual American and Israeli documents.

Prior to the October 7 attacks and subsequent Gaza war, the Qalandia checkpoint was open 24 hours per day. Immediately following 7 October, IDF checkpoints were closed. The Qalandia checkpoint opened again on 23 October, but travel was restricted to East Jerusalem residents only, and hours of operation were dramatically decreased. This disrupted work, education, and medical care for many Palestinians, who were daily commuters to workplaces, schools, and hospitals in Jerusalem. On 7 November, the Association for Civil Rights in Israel, the Legal Center for Arab Minority Rights in Israel, and The Parents' Forum petitioned the Israeli High Court of Justice (HCJ) for the Qalandia checkpoint to be returned to its previous, less restricted status in order to mitigate these disruptions. In January 2024, the HCJ ordered the state to explore solutions and "consider the passage of time, in light of the ongoing impact on the routine life of tens of thousands of Jerusalem residents." On 7 February, officials reopened the checkpoint to Palestinian residents of the West Bank, although there were still restrictions, long wait times, and the hours of operation were still limited. By September, eyewitnesses reported that wait times at Qalandia checkpoint were still long, both on foot and by car, and overcrowding was an issue. One resident reported that each car inspection took about an hour, resulting in a dramatically decreased flow of traffic.

In early 2025, amid the ongoing Gaza war, closures and movement restriction increased at various checkpoints, including Qalandia.

== Response ==
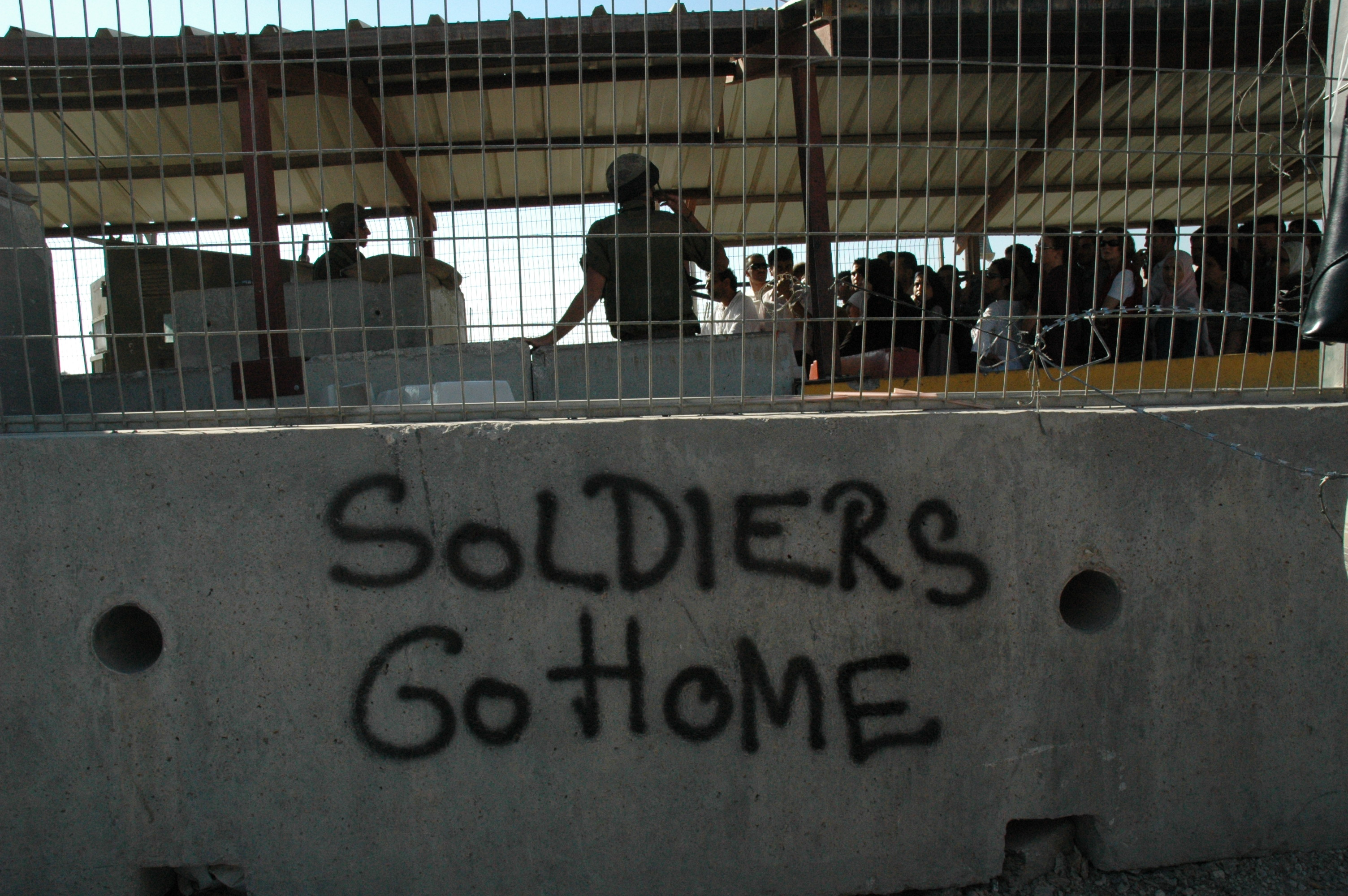
Graffiti on a barrier at Qalandia checkpoint, August 2004

In 2022, a reporter writing for +972 Magazine described Qalandia checkpoint as "a mental and psychological burden." Reuters compared it to Checkpoint Charlie, a well-known crossing point in the Berlin Wall. Several commenters have said that Qalandia checkpoint results in Palestinians being treated like livestock. Some have compared the checkpoint to a prison.

In 2005, Banksy added a stencil mural called Flying Balloon Girl to the West Bank barrier wall near Qalandia checkpoint.

== See also ==
- Israeli apartheid
- Palestinian freedom of movement
- West Bank Wall graffiti art
