= West Bank barrier =

Israeli-built barrier in the West Bank

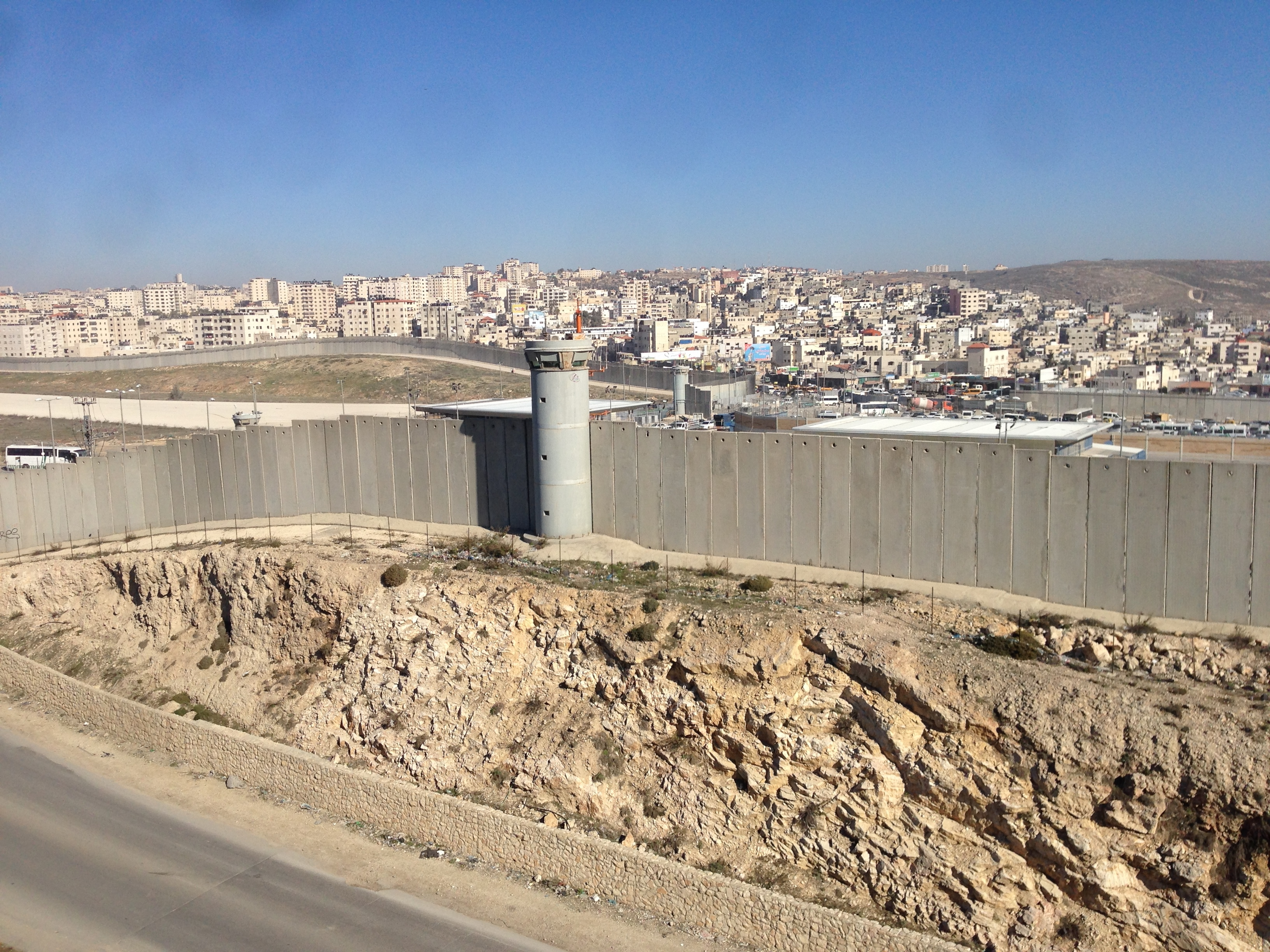
Israeli watchtowers and wall at the checkpoint of the Palestinian refugee camp of Qalandia, 2014.

Interactive map of the barrier route

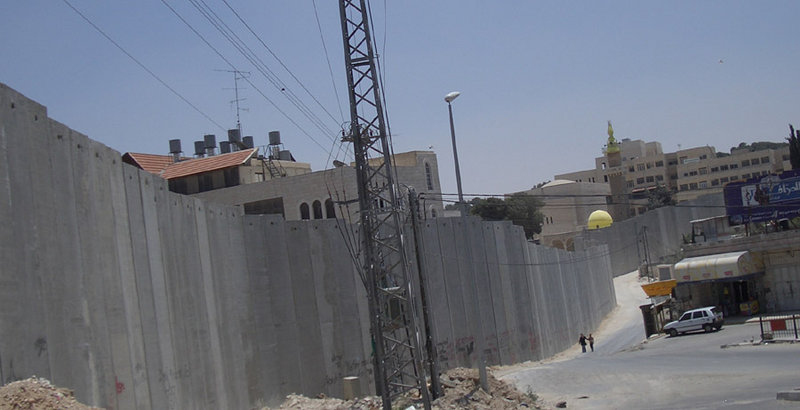
The barrier between Abu Dis and East Jerusalem, June 2004

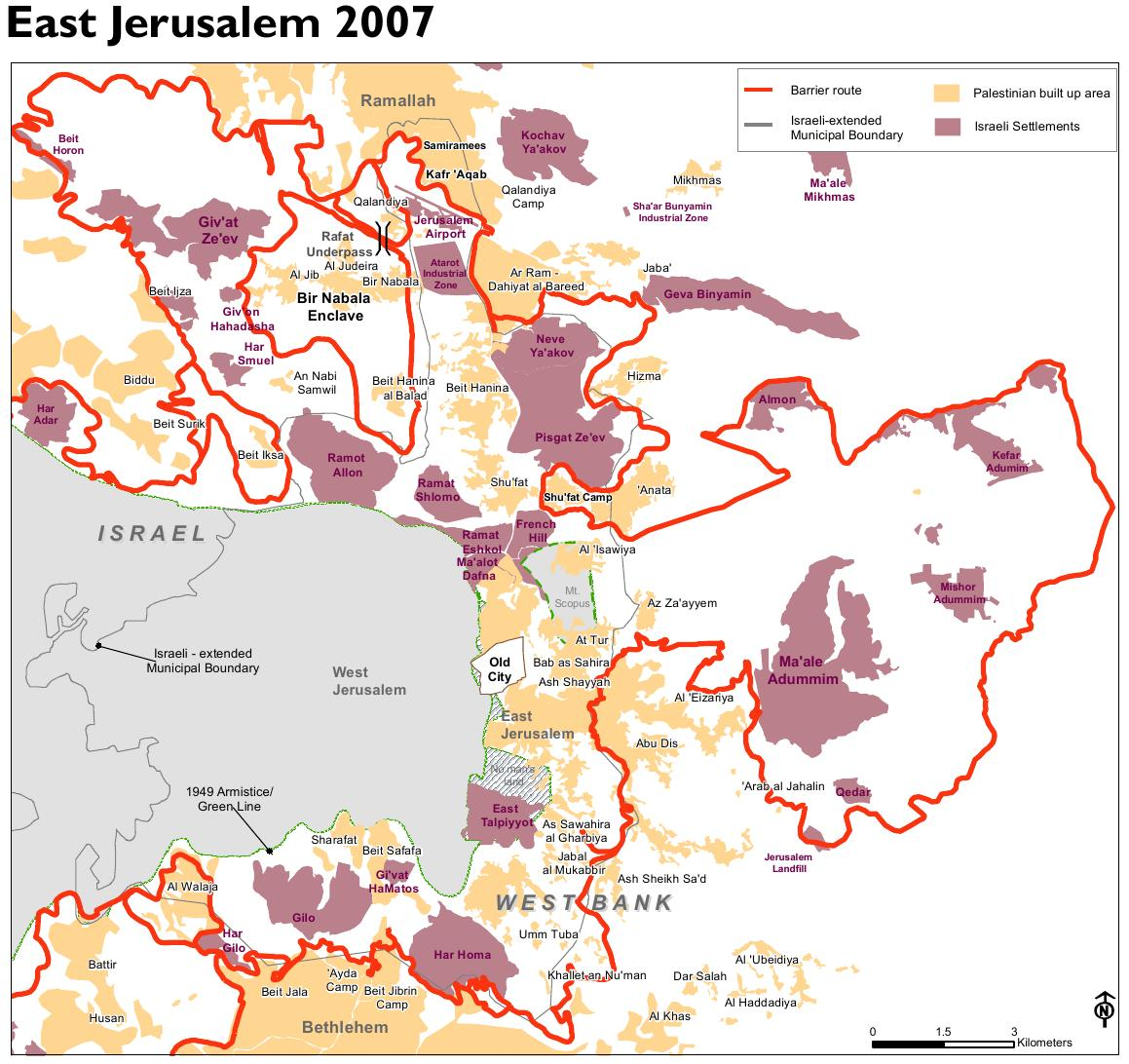
The barrier in Jerusalem (marked in red), 2007

The West Bank barrier, West Bank wall or the West Bank separation barrier, is a separation barrier built by Israel along the Green Line and inside parts of the West Bank. Israel describes the wall as a necessary security barrier against Palestinian political violence, whereas Palestinians describe it as an element of racial segregation and a representation of Israeli apartheid, often calling it a "wall of apartheid". At a total length of 708 kilometres (440 mi) upon completion, the route traced by the barrier is more than double the length of the Green Line, with 15% of its length running along the Green Line or inside Israel, and the remaining 85% running as much as 18 kilometres (11 mi) inside the West Bank, effectively isolating about 9% of the land and approximately 25,000 Palestinians from the rest of the Palestinian territory.

Israel began constructing the barrier in 2002 during the Second Intifada (2000–2005), citing the need to stop suicide bombings and attacks by Palestinian militants inside Israel. The Israeli government cites a decreased number of suicide bombings carried out from the West Bank as evidence of its efficacy, after such attacks fell from 73 between 2000 and July 2003 (the completion of the first continuous segment) to 12 between August 2003 and the end of 2006. While the barrier was initially presented as a temporary security measure at a time of heightened tensions, it has since been associated with a future political border between Israel and the State of Palestine.

The barrier has drawn criticism from Palestinians, human rights groups, and members of the international community, who have all argued that it serves as evidence of Israel's intent to annex Palestinian land under the guise of security. It has also been alleged that the construction of the wall aims to undermine the Israeli–Palestinian peace process by unilaterally establishing new de facto borders. Key points of criticism are that it substantially deviates eastward from the Green Line, severely restricts the travel of many Palestinians, and impairs their ability to commute to work within the West Bank or to Israel. The International Court of Justice issued an advisory opinion finding that the barrier violates international law. In 2003, the United Nations General Assembly adopted a resolution that charged Israel's building of the barrier as a violation of international law and demanded its removal by a vote of 144–4 with 12 abstentions.

The barrier's concrete walled sections on the Palestinian side have become a canvas for political art and graffiti by Palestinian and international artists, depicting Palestinian national symbols, resistance, their right of return, and human rights.

== Names ==
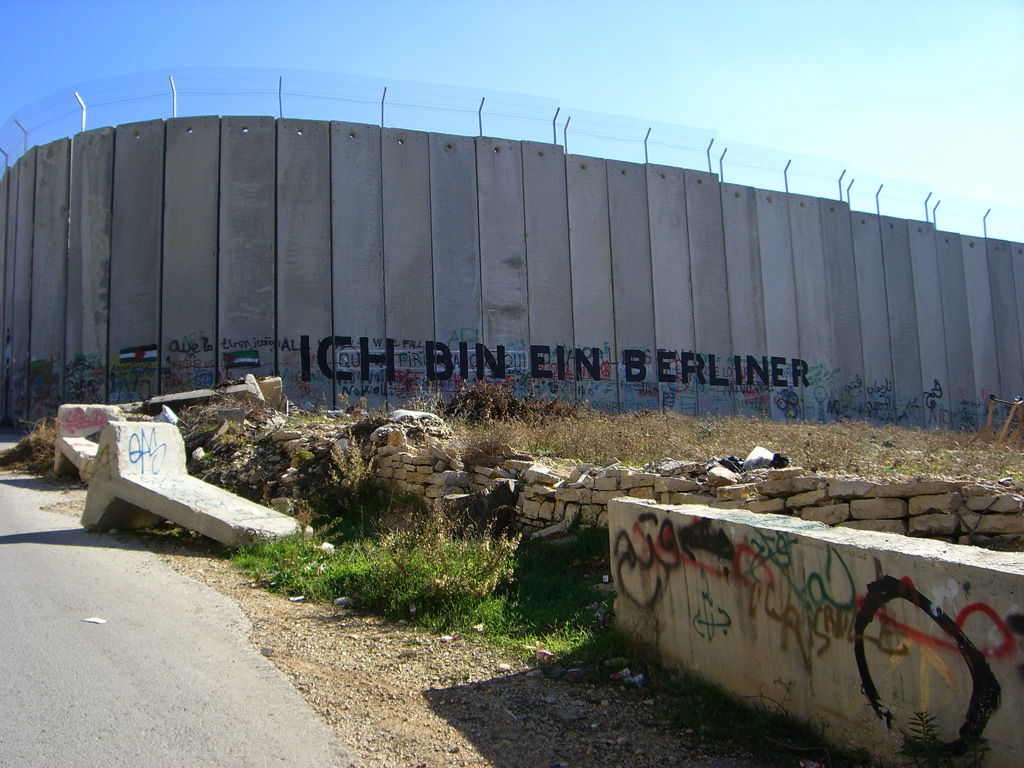
Graffiti on the road to Bethlehem in the West Bank stating "Ich bin ein Berliner"

In Hebrew, descriptions include: "separation fence" (גדר ההפרדה, Geder HaHafrada); "separation wall" (Hebrew: חומת ההפרדה, Ḥomat HaHafrada) and "security fence" (גדר הביטחון, Geder HaBitaḥon).

In Arabic, it is called "wall of apartheid"/"racial segregation wall" جدار الفصل العنصري, jidār al-faṣl al-‘unṣuriyy, indicating an allegation of Israeli apartheid.

In English, the BBC's style guide uses the terms "barrier" (sometimes "separation barrier" or "West Bank barrier") as do The Economist, PBS and The New York Times. The Israeli Ministry of Foreign Affairs uses the phrase "security fence" in English. The International Court of Justice has used the term "wall", explaining that "the other expressions sometimes employed are no more accurate if understood in the physical sense." It is also referred to as the "Apartheid Wall" or "Apartheid Fence" in a derogatory manner. "Seam zone" (Hebrew: מרחב התפר) refers to the land between the 1949 Armistice Agreement Line and the fence.

== Structure ==
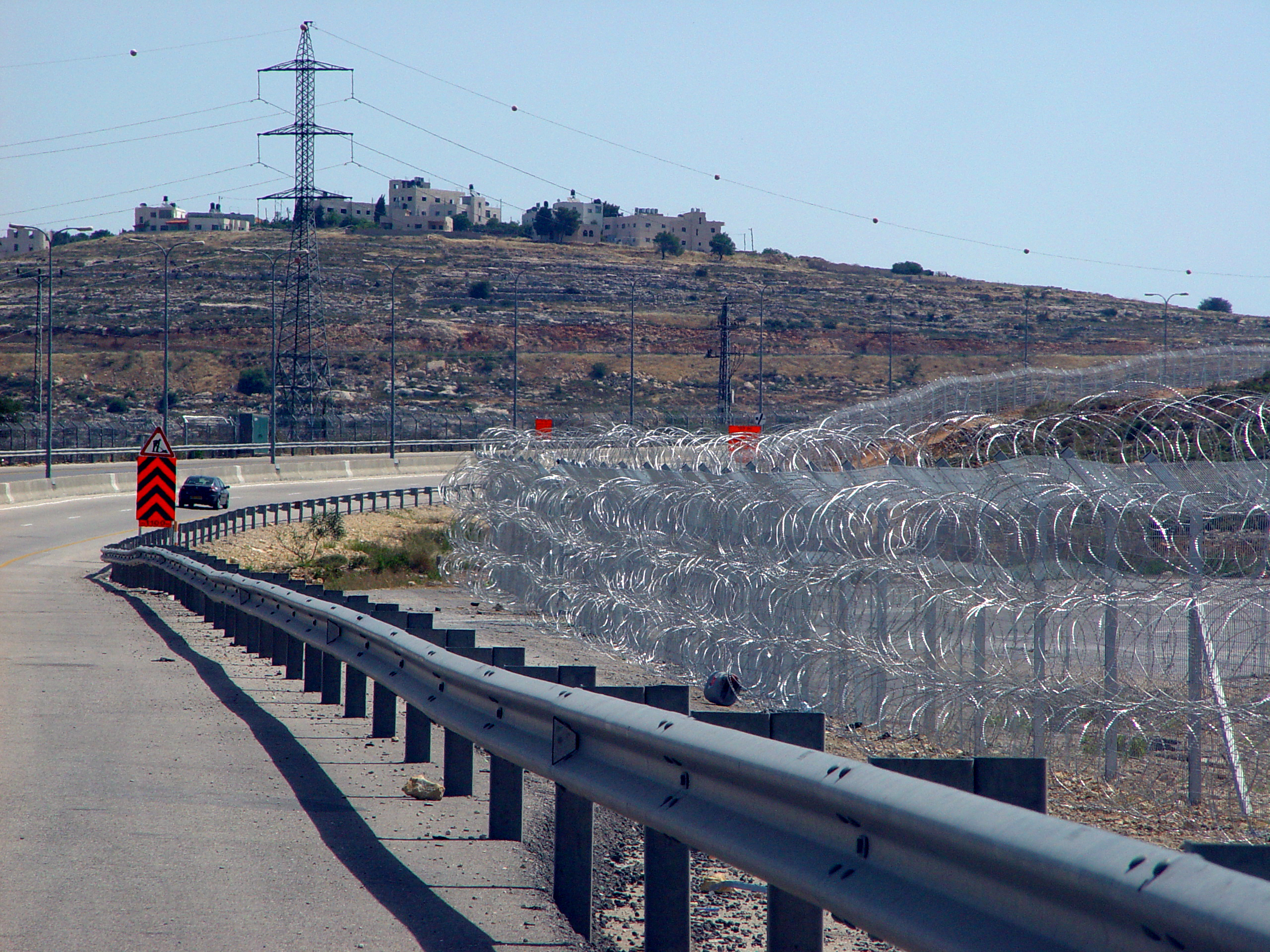
Route 443 near Giv'at Ze'ev Junction, with pyramid-shaped stacks of barbed wire forming a section of the Israeli West Bank barrier

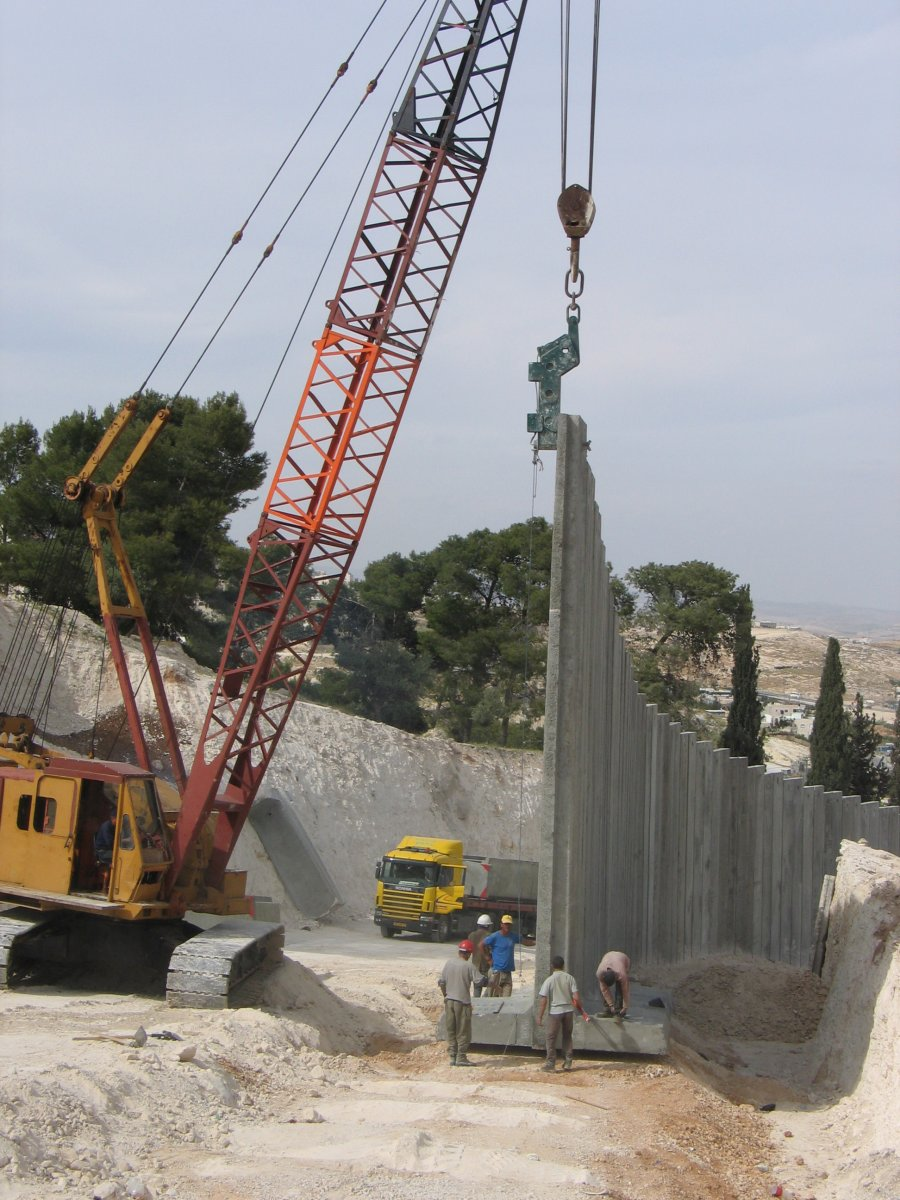
Construction of the Israeli West Bank barrier in East Jerusalem, 2004.

The barrier is described by the Israel Defense Forces as a "multi-layered composite obstacle", parts of it consisting of a 9 metres (30 ft) high concrete wall, while other stretches consist of a multi-layered fence system, with three fences with pyramid-shaped stacks of barbed wire on the two outer fences and a lighter-weight fence with intrusion detection equipment in the middle; an anti-vehicle ditch; patrol roads on both sides; and a smooth strip of sand for "intrusion tracking".

Where the multi-layered fence system is employed, it contains an exclusion area of 60-metre (200 ft) in width on average, with some sections having an exclusion area that reaches up to 100 metres (330 ft). The concrete wall has a width of 3 metres (9.8 ft), and the wall is 9 metres (30 ft) high.

== Route ==
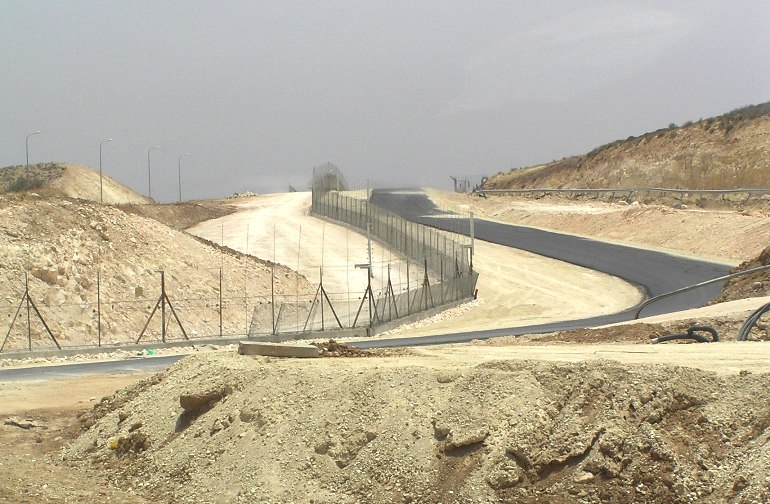
Israeli West Bank barrier – North of Meitar, near the southwest corner of the West Bank, in 2006

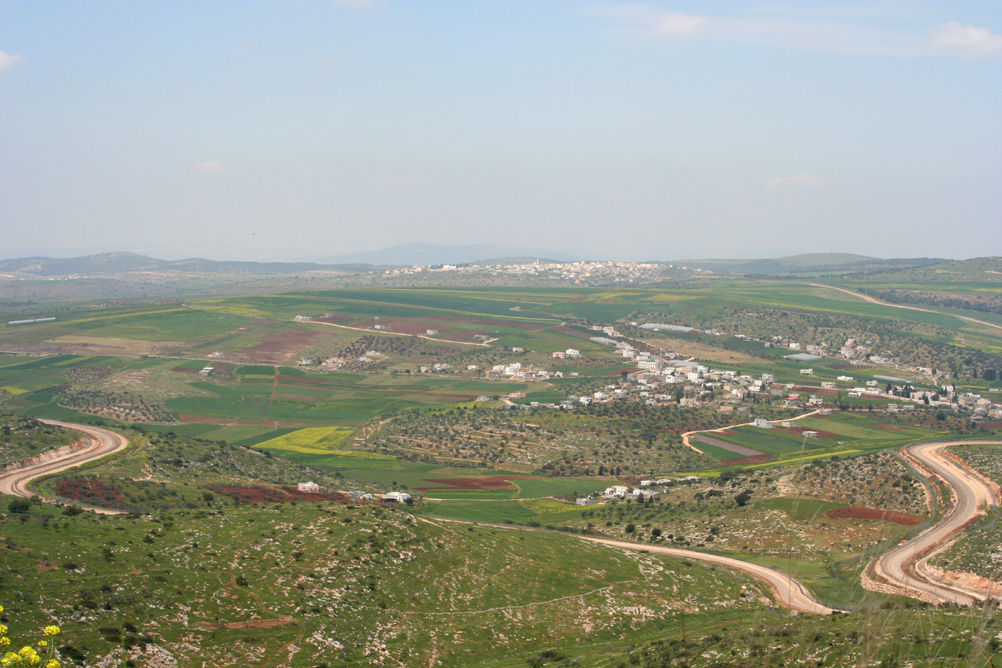
The barrier between northern West Bank and the Gilboa

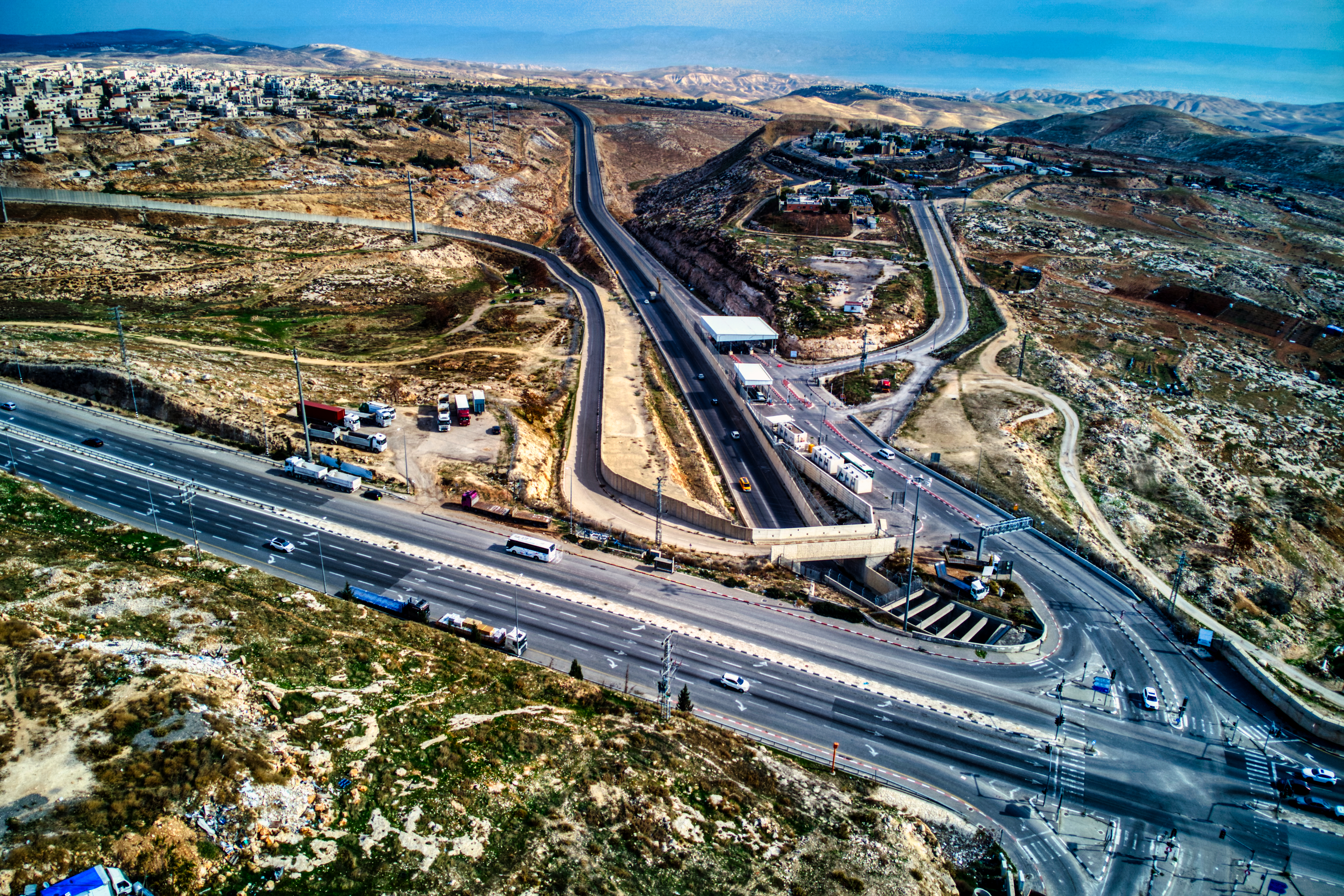
Highway 1 – Route 4370 Junction (Al-Issawiya Junction) – one can see the barrier between the Israeli and the Palestinian lanes.

The barrier runs partly along or near the 1949 Jordanian–Israeli armistice line ("Green Line") and partly through the Israeli-occupied West Bank diverging eastward from the armistice line by up to 20 km (12 mi) to include on the western side several of the areas with concentrations of highly populated Israeli settlements, such as East Jerusalem, the Ariel Bloc (Ariel, Karnei Shomron, Kedumim, Immanuel etc.), Gush Etzion, Givat Ze'ev, Oranit, and Maale Adumim.

The barrier nearly encircles some Palestinian towns, about 20% follows the armistice line, and a projected 77,000 ha (191,000 acres) or about 13.5% of the West Bank area is on the west side of the wall. According to a study of the April 2006 route by the Israeli human rights organization B'Tselem, 8.5% of the West Bank area will be on the Israeli side of the barrier after completion, and 3.4% partly or completely surrounded on the eastern side. Some 27,520 to 31,000 Palestinians will be captured on the Israeli side. Another 124,000, on the other hand, will effectively be controlled and isolated. Some 230,000 Palestinians in Jerusalem will be placed on the West Bank side. Most of the barrier was built at the northern and western edges of the West Bank, mostly beyond the Green Line and created 9 enclaves, which enclosed 15,783 ha (39,000 acres). An additional barrier, circa 10 km long, run south of Ramallah.

Israel states that the topography does not permit putting the barrier along the Green Line in some places because hills or tall buildings on the Palestinian side would make the barrier ineffective against terrorism. The International Court of Justice states that in such cases it is only legal to build the barrier inside Israel.

The barrier route has been challenged in court and changed several times. Argument presented to the court has reiterated that the cease-fire line of 1949 was negotiated "without prejudice to future territorial settlements or boundary lines" (Art. VI.9).

== Timeline ==
In 1992, the idea of creating a physical barrier between the Israeli and Palestinian populations was proposed by then-prime minister Yitzhak Rabin, following the murder of an Israeli teenage girl in Jerusalem. Rabin said that Israel must "take Gaza out of Tel Aviv" in order to minimize friction between the peoples.

Following an outbreak of violent incidents in Gaza in October 1994, Rabin said: "We have to decide on separation as a philosophy. There has to be a clear border. Without demarcating the lines, whoever wants to swallow 1.8 million Arabs will just bring greater support for Hamas." Following an attack on HaSharon Junction, near the city of Netanya, Rabin made his goals more specific: "This path must lead to a separation, though not according to the borders prior to 1967. We want to reach a separation between us and them. We do not want a majority of the Jewish residents of the state of Israel, 98% of whom live within the borders of sovereign Israel, including a united Jerusalem, to be subject to terrorism."

In 1994, the first section of a barrier (slabs of concrete contiguous for miles) was constructed. The section follows the border between Bat Hefer and Tulkarm communities.

In 1995, the Shahal commission was established by Yitzhak Rabin to discuss how to implement a barrier separating Israelis and Palestinians. Israeli Prime Minister Ehud Barak, prior to the Camp David 2000 Summit with Yasser Arafat, vowed to build a separation barrier, stating that it is "essential to the Palestinian nation in order to foster its national identity and independence without being dependent on the State of Israel".

In November 2000, during Israeli-Palestinian peace negotiations in Washington, Prime Minister Ehud Barak approved financing of a 74 km (46 mi) fence between the Wadi Ara region and Latrun. In 14 April 2002, the Cabinet of Prime Minister Ariel Sharon decided to implement the plan and create a permanent barrier in the Seam Area. The plan was approved on 23 June 2002 by the Ariel Sharon Government and work at the barrier began.

At the end of 2002, due to government inaction, several localities who suffered the most from lack of a border barrier had already started to build the barrier using their own funds directly on the green-line.

By 2003, 180 km (112 mi) had been completed and in 2004, Israel started the southern part of the barrier.

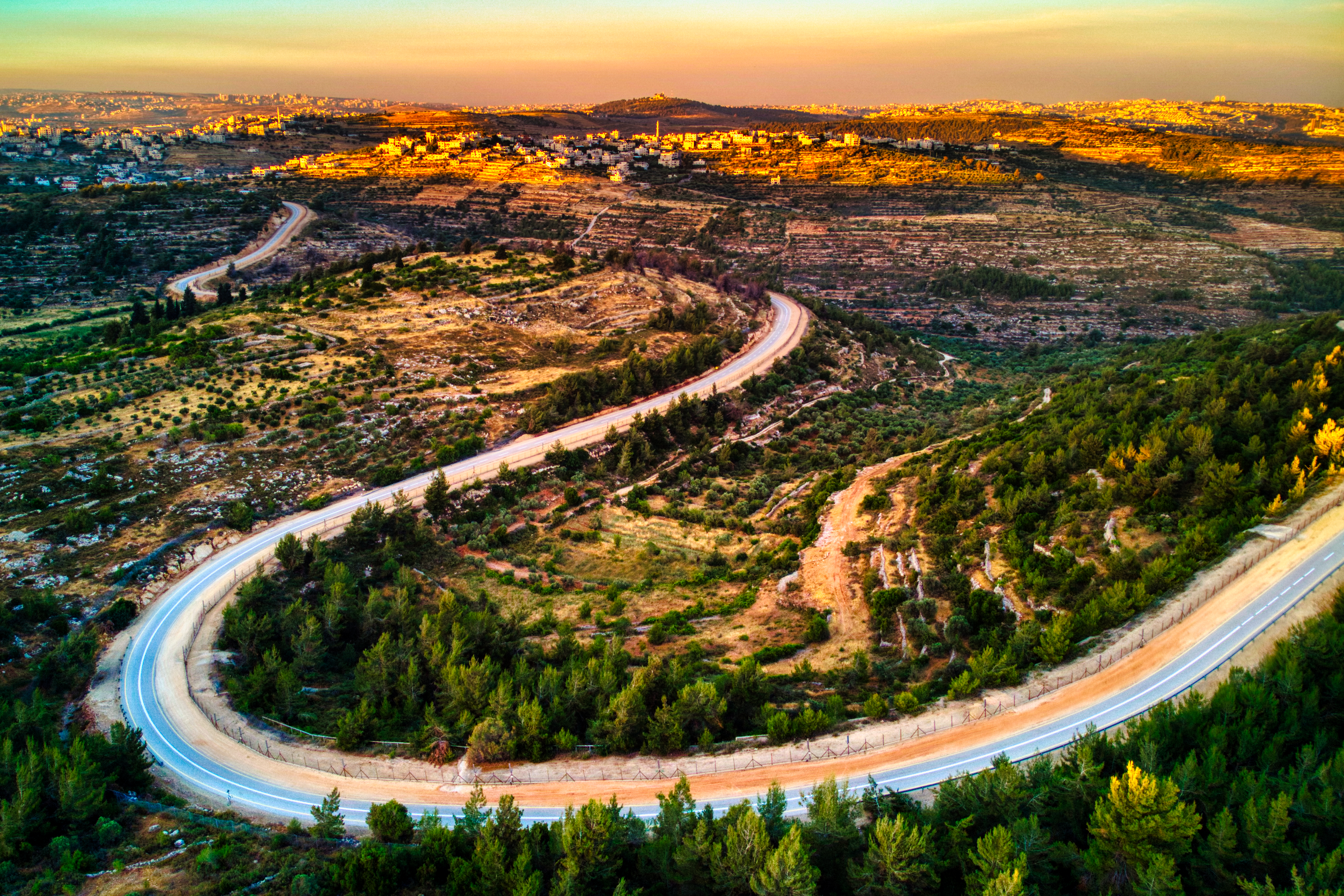
The barrier and behind it Beit Surik. "The Beit Surik Case (HCJ 2056/04)" of the Supreme Court of Israel on 30 June 2004 set the standards of proportionality between Israeli security and the injury to the Palestinian residents and resulted in a change in the route of the barrier.

In February 2004, the Israeli government said it would review the route of the barrier in response to US and Palestinian concerns. In particular, Israeli cabinet members said modifications would be made to reduce the number of checkpoints Palestinians had to cross, and especially to reduce Palestinian hardship in areas such as the city of Qalqilyah which the barrier completely surrounds. On February 20, 2005, the Israeli cabinet approved the barrier's route on the same day it approved the execution of the Gaza disengagement plan. The length of the route was increased to 670 km (416 mi) (about twice the length of the Green Line) and would leave about 10% of the West Bank, including East Jerusalem and nearly 50,000 Palestinians on the Israeli side. It also put the large settlement Maale Adumim and the Gush Etzion bloc on the Israeli side of the barrier, effectively annexing them. The final route, when realized, closes the Wall separating East Jerusalem, including Maale Adumim, from the West Bank. Before, the exact route of the barrier had not been determined, and it had been alleged by opponents that the barrier route would encircle the Samarian highlands of the West Bank, separating them from the Jordan valley. In June 2004, in exchange for Finance Minister Benjamin Netanyahu's support Israel's planned withdrawal from Gaza, Prime Minister Sharon pledged to build an extension of the barrier to the east of the settlement Ariel to be completed before the finish of the withdrawal from the Gaza Strip. Despite the ICJ opinion that the wall beyond the Green Line is illegal, Ariel Sharon reiterated on September 8, 2004, that the large settlement blocs of Ariel, Ma'aleh Adumim and Gush Etzion will be on the Israeli side of the Barrier. He also decided that the Barrier would run east of Ariel, but its connection with the main fence be postponed. Israel appropriated Palestinian private land to build the fence upon and started preparations for constructing the wall to the farthest point ever inside the West Bank, 22 km (14 mi) beyond the Green Line, 3.5 km (2.2 mi) long, and 100 m (330 ft) wide.

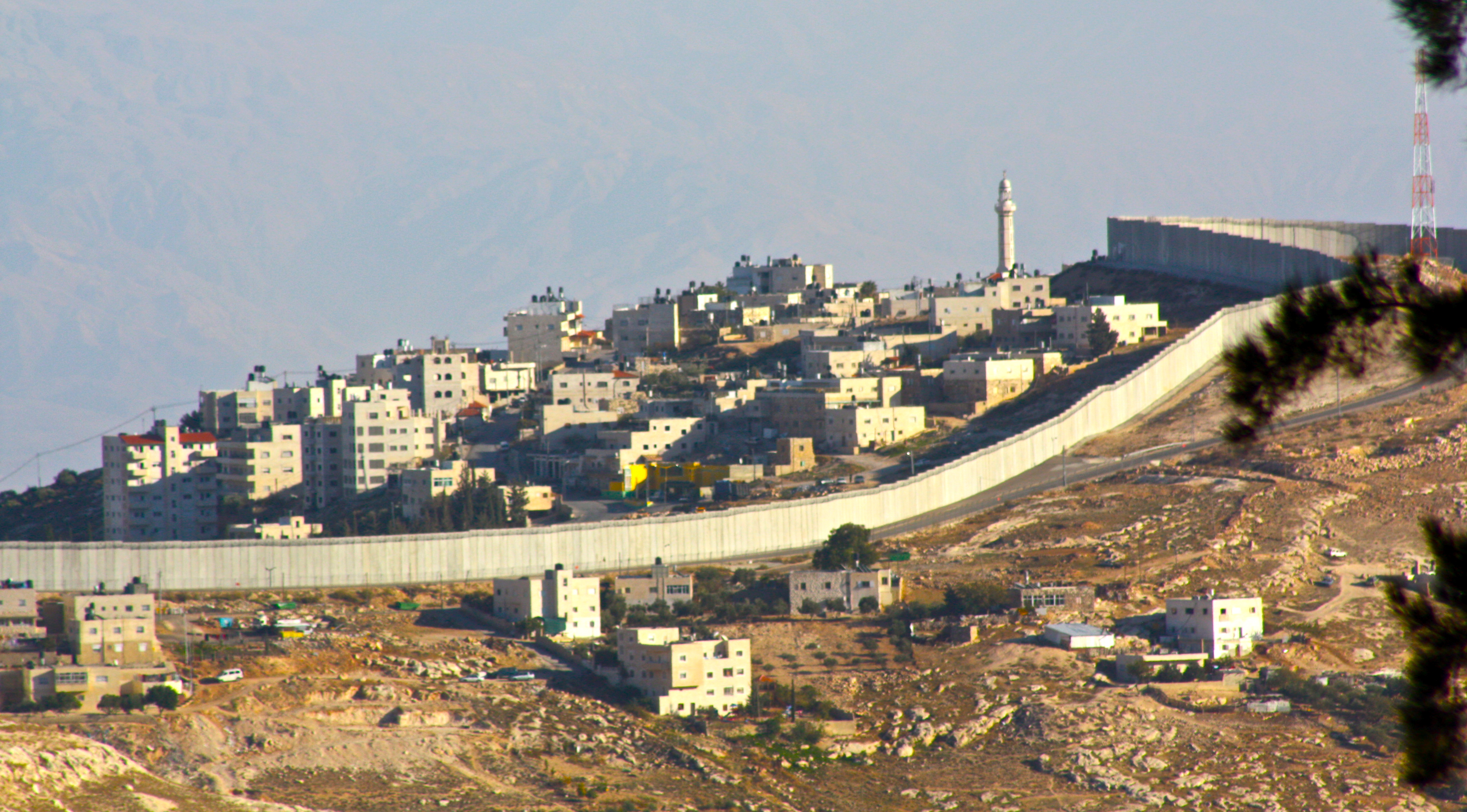
Israeli West Bank barrier near Mount Zion in 2009

In 2005, the Israeli Supreme Court made reference to the conditions and history that led to the building of the barrier. The Court described the history of violence against Israeli citizens since the breakout of the Second Intifada and the loss of life that ensued on the Israeli side. The court ruling also cited the attempts Israel had made to defend its citizens, including "military operations" carried out against "terrorist acts", and stated that these actions "did not provide a sufficient answer to the immediate need to stop the severe acts of terrorism. ... Despite all these measures, the terror did not come to an end. The attacks did not cease. Innocent people paid with both life and limb. This is the background behind the decision to construct the separation fence (Id., at p. 815)."

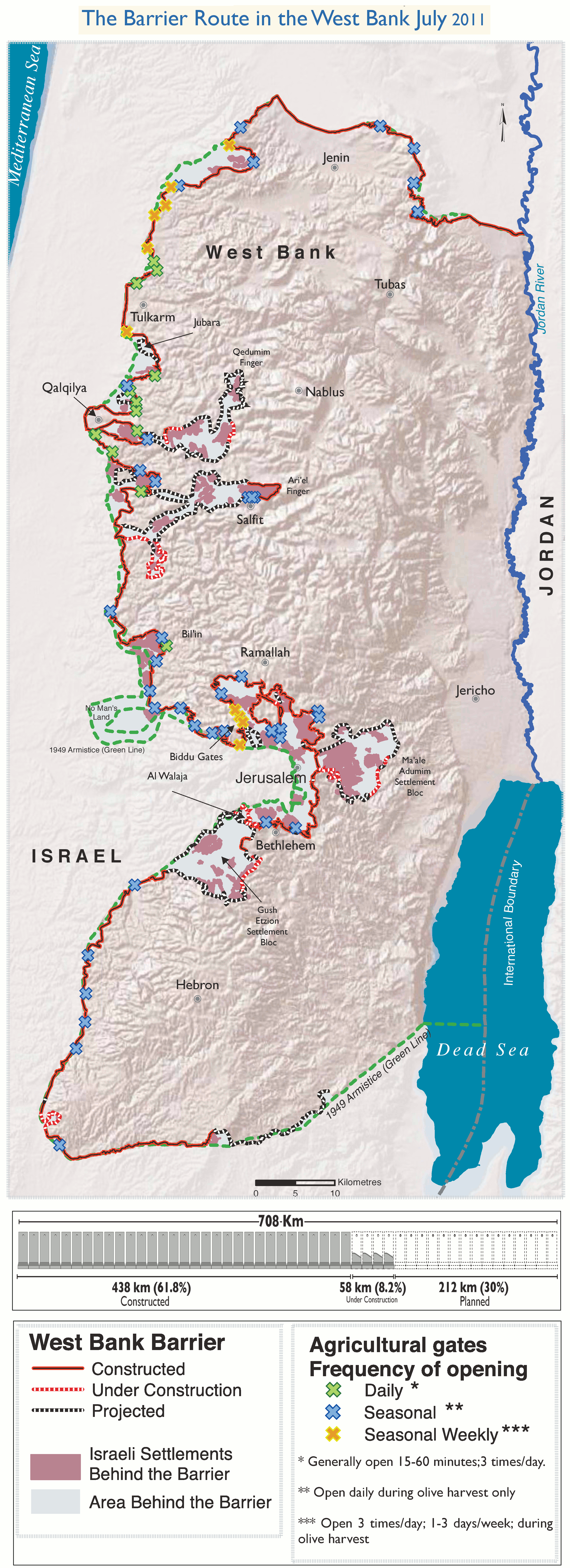
The barrier route as of July 2011: 438 km (272 mi) finished, 58 km (36 mi) under construction, 212 km (132 mi) planned

In 2006, 362 km (224.9 mi) of the barrier had been completed, 88 km (54.7 mi) was under construction and 253 km (157.2 mi) had not yet been started. On April 30, 2006, the route was revised by a cabinet decision, following a suicide bombing in Tel Aviv. In the Ariel area, the new route corrects an anomaly of the previous route that would have left thousands of Palestinians on the Israeli side. The Alfei Menashe settlement bloc was reduced in size, and the new plan leaves three groups of Palestinian houses on the Palestinian side of the fence. The barrier's route in the Jerusalem area will leave Beit Iksa on the Palestinian side; and Jaba on the Israeli side, but with a crossing to the Palestinian side at Tzurif. Further changes were made to the route around Eshkolot and Metzadot Yehuda, and the route from Metzadot to Har Choled was approved.

In 2012, 440 km (273.4 mi) (62%) of the barrier had been completed.

In September 2014, eight years after approving the 45 km stretch of barrier enclosing Gush Etzion, no progress had been made on it, and Israel reopened the debate. The fence is scheduled to go through the national park, the Nahal Rafaim valley, and the Palestinian village of Battir. The Israeli land appropriated in Gva'ot would be on the Palestinian side of the barrier. On 21 September 2014, the government voted to not reauthorize the barrier in the Gush Etzion area.

In 2022, 45 km (28.0 mi) of the barrier that had been built as a multi-layered fence were replaced by new sections of the 9-meter high concrete wall.

== Effectiveness ==
Suicide bombings have decreased since the construction of the barrier. Israeli officials (including the head of the Shin Bet) quoted in the newspaper Maariv have said that in the areas where the barrier was complete, the number of hostile infiltrations has decreased to almost zero. Maariv also stated that Palestinian militants, including a senior member of Islamic Jihad, had confirmed that the barrier made it much harder to conduct attacks inside Israel. In a March 23, 2008 interview, Palestinian Islamic Jihad leader Ramadan Shalah complained to the Qatari newspaper Al-Sharq that the separation barrier "limits the ability of the resistance to arrive deep within [Israeli territory] to carry out suicide bombing attacks, but the resistance has not surrendered or become helpless, and is looking for other ways to cope with the requirements of every stage" of the intifada.

Other factors are also cited as causes for the decline. According to Haaretz, a 2006 report by the Shin Beit concluded that "[t]he fence does make it harder for them [terrorists]" but that attacks in 2005 decreased due to increased pursuing of Palestinian militants by the Israeli army and intelligence organizations, Hamas's increased political activity, and a truce among Palestinian militant groups in the Palestinian Territories. Haaretz reported, "[t]he security fence is no longer mentioned as the major factor in preventing suicide bombings, mainly because the terrorists have found ways to bypass it." Former Israeli Secretary of Defence Moshe Arens says that the reduction in Palestinian violence is largely due to the IDF's entry into the West Bank in 2002.

== Effects on Palestinians ==
The barrier has many effects on Palestinians including reduced freedoms, reduction of the number of Israel Defense Forces checkpoints and road closures, loss of land, increased difficulty in accessing medical and educational services in Israel, restricted access to water sources, and economic effects.

=== Reduced freedoms ===
In a 2005 report, the United Nations stated that:

... it is difficult to overstate the humanitarian impact of the Barrier. The route inside the West Bank severs communities, people's access to services, livelihoods and religious and cultural amenities. In addition, plans for the Barrier's exact route and crossing points through it are often not fully revealed until days before construction commences. This has led to considerable anxiety amongst Palestinians about how their future lives will be impacted. ... The land between the Barrier and the Green Line constitutes some of the most fertile in the West Bank. It is currently the home for 49,400 West Bank Palestinians living in 38 villages and towns.

An often-quoted example of the effects of the barrier is the Palestinian town of Qalqilyah, a city of around 45,000, which is surrounded almost on all sides by the barrier. One 8 meter-high concrete section of this wall follows the Green Line between the city and the nearby Trans-Israel Highway. According to the BBC, this section, referred to as an "anti-sniper wall", is intended to prevent gun attacks against Israeli motorists on the Trans-Israel Highway. The city is accessible through a military checkpoint on the main road from the east, and a tunnel built in September 2004 on the south side connects Qalqilyah with the adjacent village of Habla. In 2005, the Israeli Supreme Court ordered the government to change the route of the barrier in this area to ease movement of Palestinians between Qalqilyah and five surrounding villages. In the same ruling, the court rejected the arguments that the fence must be built only on the Green Line. The ruling cited the topography of the terrain, security considerations, and sections 43 and 52 of The Hague Regulations 1907 and Article 53 of the Fourth Geneva Convention as reasons for this rejection.

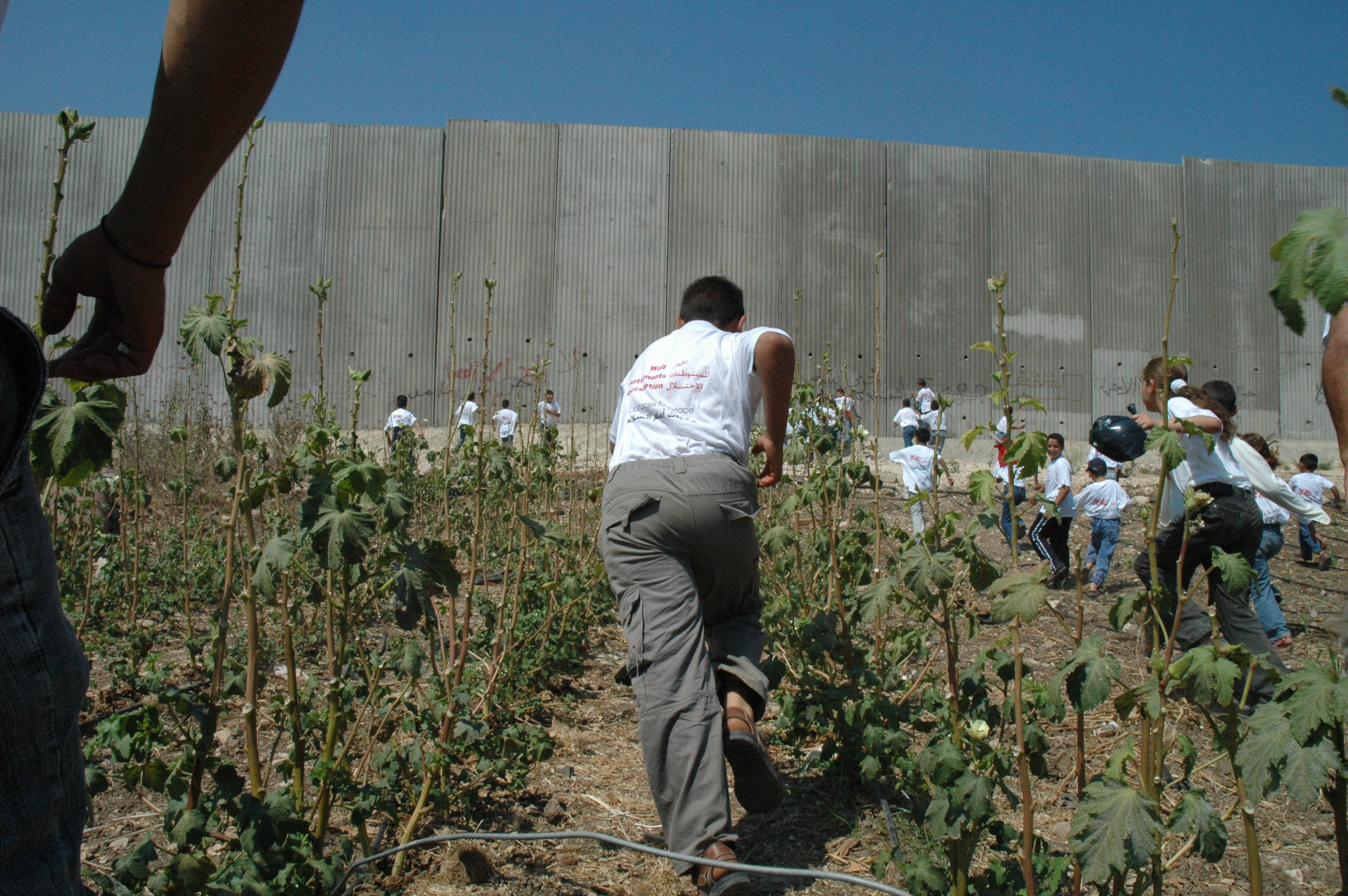
Palestinian children running towards the barrier, August 2004

In early October 2003, the IDF OC Central Command declared the area between the separation barrier in the northern section of the West Bank (Stage 1) and the Green Line a closed military area for an indefinite period. New directives stated that every Palestinian over the age of twelve living in the enclaves created in the closed area have to obtain a "permanent resident permit" from the Civil Administration to enable them to continue to live in their homes, approximately 27,250 people in all. Other residents of the West Bank have to obtain special permits to enter the area.

=== Fewer checkpoints and roadblocks ===
In June 2004, The Washington Times reported that the reduced Israeli military incursions in Jenin have prompted efforts to rebuild damaged streets and buildings and a gradual return to a semblance of normality, and in a letter dated October 25, 2004, from the Israeli mission to Kofi Annan, Israel's government pointed out that a number of restrictions east of the barrier have been lifted as a result of it, including a reduction in checkpoints from 71 to 47 and roadblocks from 197 to 111. The Jerusalem Post reports that, for some Palestinians who are Israeli citizens living in the Israeli Arab town of Umm el-Fahm (population 42,000) near Jenin, the barrier has "significantly improved their lives" because, on one hand, it prevents would-be thieves or terrorists from coming to their town and, on the other hand, has increased the flow of customers from other parts of Israel who would normally have patronised Palestinian business in the West Bank, resulting in an economic boom. The report states that the downsides are that the barrier has divided families in half and "damaged Israeli Arabs' solidarity with the Palestinians living on the other side of the Green Line".

A UN report released in August 2005 observed that the existence of the barrier "replaced the need for closures: movement within the northern West Bank, for example, is less restrictive where the Barrier has been constructed. Physical obstacles have also been removed in Ramallah and al-Bireh Governorate and Jerusalem Governorate where the Barrier is under construction." The report says that more freedom of movement in rural areas may ease Palestinian access to hospitals and schools, but also says that restrictions on movement between urban population centers have not significantly changed.

=== Loss of land ===
Parts of the barrier are built on land seized from Palestinians, or between Palestinians and their lands. In a 2009 report, the UN said that the most recent barrier route allocates more segments to be built on the Green Line itself compared to previous draft routes of the barrier. However, in its current route the barrier annexes 9.5% of the total area of the West Bank to the Israeli side of the barrier.

In early 2003, 63 shops straddling the Green Line were demolished by the IDF during construction of the wall in the village of Nazlat Issa. In August 2003, an additional 115 shops and stalls (an important source of income for several communities) and five to seven homes there were also demolished.

According to the United Nations Relief and Works Agency (UNRWA), 15 communities were to be directly affected, numbering about 138,593 Palestinians, including 13,450 refugee families, or 67,250 people. In addition to loss of land, in the city of Qalqilyah one-third of the city's water wells lie on the other side of the barrier. The Israeli Supreme Court says the Israeli government's rejection of accusations of a de facto annexation of these wells, stating that "the construction of the fence does not affect the implementation of the water agreements determined in the (interim) agreement".

The United Nations Economic and Social Commission for Western Asia (ESCWA) estimates that in the north of the West Bank about 80 per cent of Palestinians who own land on the other side of the barrier have not received permits from the Israeli authorities, and hence cannot cultivate their fields.

Israel has built a barrier in the Jordan Valley near the Jordanian border. A plan to build another barrier between the West Bank and the Jordan valley was abandoned because of international condemnation after the 2004 International Court opinion, instead instituting a restrictive permit regime for Palestinians. However, it has changed the route to allow settlements to annex parcels of land. The existing barrier cuts off access to the Jordan River for Palestinian farmers in the West Bank. Israeli settlement councils already have de facto control of 86 percent of the Jordan Valley and the Dead Sea as the settler population steadily grows there. In 2013, Ehud Barak, Israeli Defense Minister at the time, proposed that Israel should consider unilateral disengagement from the West Bank and the dismantling of settlements beyond the separation barrier, but maintain a military presence in the Jordan Valley along the West Bank-Jordan border.

=== Health and medical services ===
Médecins du Monde, the Palestinian Red Crescent Society and Physicians for Human Rights-Israel have stated that the barrier "harms West Bank health". Upon completion of the construction, the organizations predict, the barrier would prevent over 130,000 Palestinian children from being immunised, and deny more than 100,000 pregnant women (out of which 17,640 are high risk pregnancies) access to healthcare in Israel. In addition, almost a third of West Bank villages will suffer from lack of access to healthcare. After completion, many residents may lose complete access to emergency care at night. In towns near Jerusalem (Abu Dis and al-Eizariya), for example, average time for an ambulance to travel to the nearest hospital has increased from 10 minutes to over 110 minutes. A report from Physicians for Human Rights-Israel states that the barrier imposes "almost-total separation" on the hospitals from the population they are supposed to serve. The report also said that patients from the West Bank visiting Jerusalem's Palestinian clinics declined by half from 2002 to 2003.

=== Rights, freedom and mobility of Palestinians working in Israel ===
The wall significantly impacts the rights, freedom and mobility of Palestinian workers especially. It represents for Palestinians a complex system of control, surveillance and oppression. According to the Washington Post, about 70,000 Palestinians cross checkpoints daily to work in Israel, mainly in construction sites. Security forces at checkpoints have the authority to turn back Palestinians without reason or, as often is the case, turn a short commute into an hours-long, humiliating journey. Workers leave their homes in the very early morning, some as early as 2am, and spend hours commuting, not returning to their homes until the late evening. The military checkpoints they need to cross are usually overcrowded, in poor conditions and characterized by long processing times. They are herded through congested steel cages and metal turnstiles and go through invasive security checks. They are not allowed to take their own tools, food and drinks with them, adding an additional financial burden. Several human rights organizations, such as Amnesty International and Human Rights Watch, have reported human rights abuses inside checkpoints, including arbitrary arrests and unlawful shootings. The daily struggle and humiliation of going through a checkpoint is not only for workers but also for those communities that were cut in two by the presence of the separation wall. West Bank Palestinians who live on the Jerusalem side in areas like Nabi Samuel are forbidden to go to the Jerusalem site outside their homes and must cross a checkpoint to attend schools or go to work or to the hospital.

=== Economic changes ===
In 2013, the World Bank cited estimates of costs to the West Bank economy attributable to "barriers" combined with "checkpoints and movement permits" of USD $185m and $229m. Foreign Affairs contributor David Makovsky estimated the number of West Bank Palestinians who lived on the Israeli side in 2004 as "fewer than one percent" but noted that a larger number living in enclaves like Qalqiliya adjacent to the fence were also adversely affected. The Israeli human rights organisation B'Tselem says that "thousands of Palestinians have difficulty going to their fields and marketing their produce in other areas of the West Bank. Farming is a primary source of income in the Palestinian communities situated along the Barrier's route, an area that constitutes one of the most fertile areas in the West Bank. The harm to the farming sector is liable to have drastic economic effects on the residents – whose economic situation is already very difficult – and drive many families into poverty."

== Legality ==
=== United Nations Security Council ===
In October 2003, a United Nations resolution to declare the barrier illegal where it deviates from the Green Line and should be torn down was vetoed by the US in the United Nations Security Council.

On May 19, 2004, the UN passed Security Council Resolution 1544 reiterating the obligation of Israel, the occupying Power, to abide scrupulously by its legal obligations and responsibilities under the Fourth Geneva Convention, and called on Israel to address its security needs within the boundaries of international law. In a special emergency session of the General Assembly, the United Nations asked the International Court of Justice [ICJ] to evaluate the legal status of the barrier. Israel chose not to accept ICJ jurisdiction nor make oral statements, and instead submitted a 246-page written statement containing the views of the Government of Israel on Jurisdiction and Propriety to the Court.

=== International Court of Justice ===
In a 2004 advisory opinion by the International Court of Justice, "Israel cannot rely on a right of self-defence or on a state of necessity in order to preclude the wrongfulness of the construction of the wall". The Court asserted that "the construction of the wall, and its associated régime, are contrary to international law."

So in the July 9, 2004, advisory opinion the ICJ advised that the barrier is a violation of international law, that it should be removed, that Arab residents should be compensated for any damage done, and that other states take action to obtain Israel's compliance with the Fourth Geneva Convention. The ICJ said that an occupying power cannot claim that the lawful inhabitants of the occupied territory constitute a "foreign" threat for the purposes of Article 51 of the UN Charter. It also explained that necessity may constitute a circumstance precluding wrongfulness under certain very limited circumstances, but that Article 25 of the International Law Commission's Articles on Responsibility of States for Internationally Wrongful Acts (ARSIWA) bars a defense of necessity if the State has contributed to the situation of necessity. The Court cited illegal interference by the government of Israel with the Palestinian's national right to self-determination; and land confiscations, house demolitions, the creation of enclaves, and restrictions on movement and access to water, food, education, health care, work, and an adequate standard of living in violation of Israel's obligations under international law. The Court also said that Israeli settlements had been established and that Palestinians had been displaced in violation of Article 49, paragraph 6, of the Fourth Geneva Convention. On request of the ICJ, Palestine submitted a copious statement. The UN Fact Finding Mission and several UN Rapporteurs subsequently said that in the movement and access policy there has been a violation of the right not to be discriminated against on the basis of race or national origin.

Israeli supporters of the barrier stood in the plaza near the courthouse, holding the portraits of 927 terror victims. The organization Christians for Israel helped bring the No. 19 bus, on which eleven civilians were killed, to the Hague.

=== Israel ===
In April 2003, B'Tselem stated that "Israel has made cynical use of security claims to justify grave human rights violations in the Occupied Territories...Among other things the determination of the route of the barrier was based on political considerations, the attempt to leave the settlements to the west of the barrier, and protection of access routes for religious sites – none of which are at all related to military considerations. This situation is likely to render the entire separation barrier project illegal according to international law."

On June 30, 2004, the Supreme Court of Israel ruled that a portion of the barrier west of Jerusalem violated the rights of Palestinians, and ordered 30 km (19 mi) of existing and planned barrier to be rerouted. However, it did rule that the barrier is legal in principle and accepted the Israeli government's assertion that it is a security measure.

On September 15, 2005, the Supreme Court of Israel ordered the Israeli government to alter the route of the barrier to ensure that negative impacts on Palestinians would be minimized and proportional.

== Opinions of the barrier ==
=== United Nations ===
In December 2003, Resolution ES-10/14 was adopted by the United Nations General Assembly in an emergency special session. 90 states voted for, 8 against, 74 abstained. The resolution included a request to the International Court of Justice to urgently render an advisory opinion on the following question:

What are the legal consequences arising from the construction of the wall being built by Israel, the occupying Power, in the Occupied Palestinian Territory, including in and around East Jerusalem, as described in the report of the Secretary-General, considering the rules and principles of international law, including the Fourth Geneva Convention of 1949, and relevant Security Council and General Assembly resolutions?

The court concluded that the barrier violated international law. On 20 July 2004, the UN General Assembly accepted Resolution ES-10/15 condemning the barrier with 150 countries voting for the resolution and 10 abstaining. 6 countries voted against: Israel, the US, Australia, the Federated States of Micronesia, the Marshall Islands and Palau. The US and Israel rejected both the verdict and the resolution. All 25 members of the European Union voted in favour of the resolution after it was amended to include calls for Israelis and Palestinians to meet their obligations under the "roadmap" peace plan.

=== Israeli opinions ===
According to a survey conducted by the Tami Steinmetz Center for Peace Research, an academic research institution of Tel Aviv University, there was overwhelming support for the barrier among the Jewish population of Israel: 84% in March 2004 and 78% in June 2004.

Some Israelis oppose the barrier. The Israeli Peace Now movement has stated that while they would support a barrier that follows the 1949 Armistice lines, the "current route of the fence is intended to destroy all chances of a future peace settlement with the Palestinians and to annex as much land as possible from the West Bank" and that the barrier would "only increase the blood to be spilt on both sides and continue the sacrificing of Israeli and Palestinian lives for the settlements." Some Israeli left wing activists, such as Anarchists Against the Wall and Gush Shalom, are active in protests against the barrier, especially in the West Bank towns of Bil'in and Jayyous.

Shaul Arieli, a senior member of the Council for Peace and Security and one of the architects of the Geneva Initiative wrote in Haaretz in March 2009 of the importance "to complete the fence along a route based on security considerations." Arieli argued that the fence was justified by what he described as legitimate security concerns regarding Palestinian terrorism and violence, but was critical of the then-government's alleged negligence of completing the fence due to budgetary and political considerations. He called on the public to "demand that the new government complete the fence quickly and along a logical route."

Daniel Ayalon, Israel's ambassador to the United States, suggested that reduced ability to conduct attacks would "save the political process" because the barrier would neutralize the ability of militant groups "to hold that process hostage" by conducting these acts.

Natan Sharansky, Minister of Housing and Construction at the time, viewed the security fence as an option for Israel to defend itself, because the Palestinian Authority had not become a partner in fighting terror, as it was obliged to do under all the agreements that it signed

The Anti-Defamation League heavily criticized the opinion of the Court of Justice condemning the West Bank Barrier, asserting that the outcome was stacked against Israel in advance through the biased wording of the submission. It said that Israel was systematically excluded from any say in the Court's makeup and asserted that an anti-Israel environment prevails at the General Assembly, which "regularly demonize[s] Israel". According to the ADL, the politicized nature of the process that produced the opinion threatens to undermine the integrity of the Court and contravene constructive efforts to promote peace in the region.

=== Palestinian opinions ===
The Palestinian population and its leadership are essentially unanimous in opposing the barrier. A significant number of Palestinians have been separated from their own farmlands or their places of work or study, and many more will be separated as the barriers near Jerusalem are completed. Furthermore, because of its planned route as published by the Israeli government, the barrier is perceived as a plan to confine the Palestinian population to specific areas. They state that Palestinian institutions in Abu Dis will be prevented from providing services to residents in the East Jerusalem suburbs, and that a 10-minute walk has become a 3-hour drive in order to reach a gate, to go (if allowed) through a crowded military checkpoint, and drive back to the destination on the other side.

More broadly, Palestinian spokespersons, supported by many in the Israeli left wing and other organizations, say that the hardships imposed by the barrier will breed further discontent amongst the affected population and add to the security problem rather than solving it.

In his November 2006 interview with Al-Manar TV, Palestinian Islamic Jihad leader Ramadan Salah said that the barrier is an important obstacle, and that "if it weren't there, the situation would be entirely different."

The Palestinian National Authority has accused the U.S. of rewarding construction of the barrier and replied, "[t]he U.S. assurances are being made at the expense of the Palestinian people and the Arab world without the knowledge of the legitimate Palestinian leadership. They are rewarding illegal occupation, settlement and the apartheid wall."

For over five years (2005–2010), hundreds of Palestinians and Israeli activists gathered every week to protest the barrier at the town of Bil'in. A number of Palestinian protesters have been killed by the IDF while protesting. According to a commander of the Israeli Prison Service's 'Masada' unit, covert operatives of the Israeli government have posed as protesters and threw stones in the general direction of the IDF to create a pretext for arresting protesters. Protesters posed as members of the fictional "Na'vi" race of the major motion picture "Avatar" during protests following release of the movie, in an effort to compare the Palestinian struggle with that of the fictional Na'vi race, who must defend themselves and their homeland against foreign invaders.

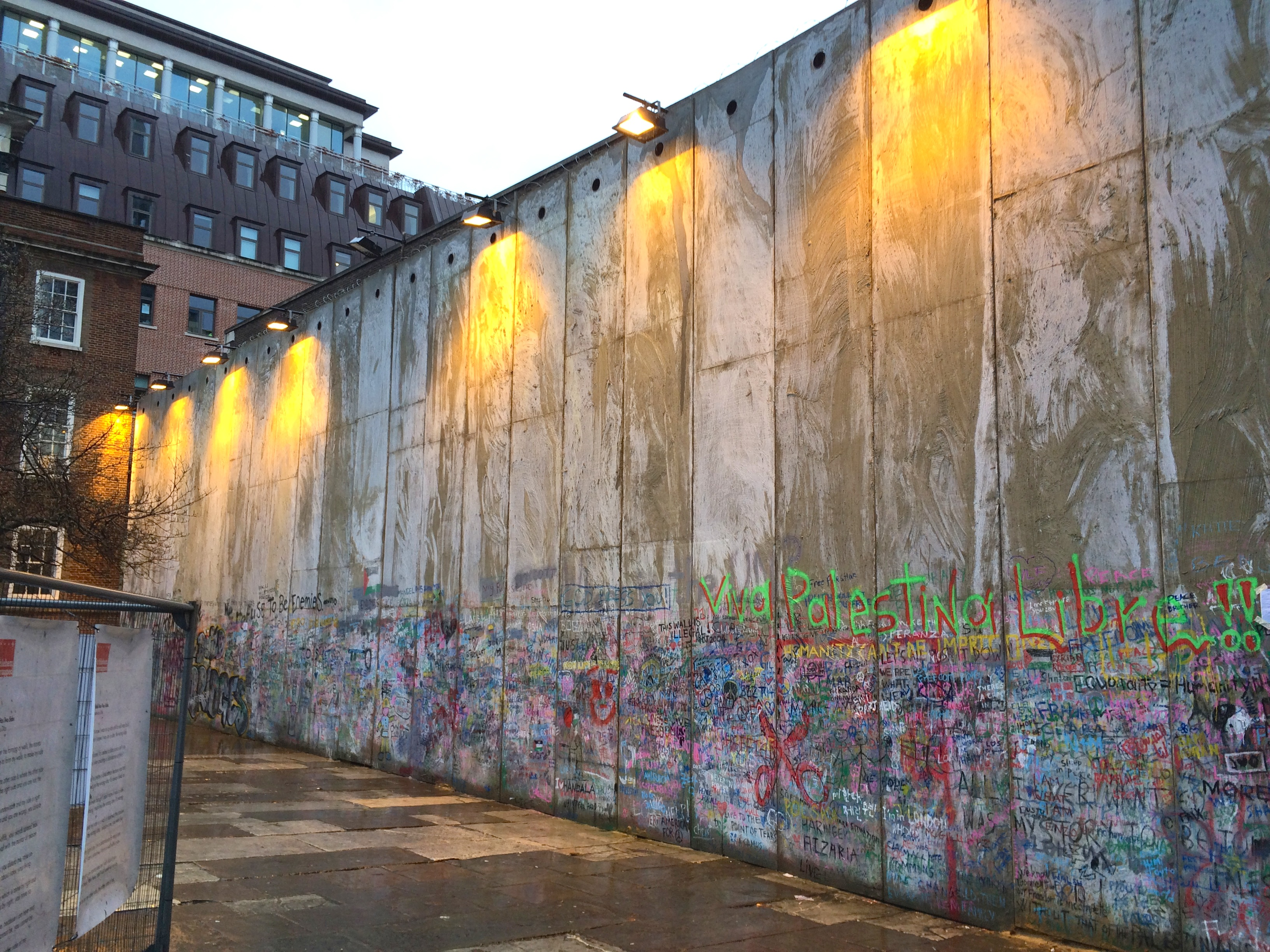
Replica section of the Israeli Barrier, built in London in 2013, as part of the international protest against the Israeli wall

Between 23 December 2013 and 5 January 2014 a major demonstration against the wall was staged in London, in the grounds of St James's Church, Piccadilly. The demonstration was entitled "Bethlehem Unwrapped", and featured a large section of replica wall, reproducing both the fabric of the Israeli wall, and the graffiti to be found on it. Protesters staffed the wall in order to explain the demonstration to visitors and passers-by. Large signs were erected, drawing attention to intentional protest against the wall. Particular reference was made to the International Court of Justice judgement of 9 July 2004 that the security wall contravened international law. The demonstration took place just days after the death of Nelson Mandela, and prominence was therefore given on billboards to Mandella's statement "The UN took a strong stand against apartheid...We know too well that our freedom is incomplete without the freedom of the Palestinians". The replica wall, which was 8 metres tall (the same height as the actual wall) was constructed as an art installation by Justin Butcher, Geof Thompson, and Dean Willars, who also credited Deborah Burtin of Tipping Point North South. They invited visitors to add additional graffiti, particularly in the forms of prayers for peace. St James' Church, which allowed the demonstration on its grounds, and permitted its own church building to be almost entirely hidden by the wall, issued a public statement supporting the right of Israel to defend its borders, but condemning the wall, and the suffering which it caused to Palestinian peoples. The church statement drew attention to the request of the World Council of Churches for all Christians to oppose the wall.

=== Other International opinions ===
==== The Red Cross ====
The Red Cross has declared the barrier in violation of the Geneva Convention. On February 18, 2004, The International Committee of the Red Cross stated that the Israeli barrier "causes serious humanitarian and legal problems" and goes "far beyond what is permissible for an occupying power".

==== Human rights organizations ====
Amnesty International, Human Rights Watch and other Human rights groups have protested both the routing of the wall and the means by which the land to build the wall was obtained. The Israeli women of Machsom Watch regularly monitor events at checkpoints and report their findings. In a 2004 report Amnesty International wrote that "The fence/wall, in its present configuration, violates Israel's obligations under international humanitarian law."

They continue:

Since the summer of 2002 the Israeli army has been destroying large areas of Palestinian agricultural land, as well as other properties, to make way for a fence/wall which it is building in the West Bank.

In addition to the large areas of particularly fertile Palestinian farmland that have been destroyed, other larger areas have been cut off from the rest of the West Bank by the fence/wall.

The fence/wall is not being built between Israel and the Occupied Territories but mostly (close to 90%) inside the West Bank, turning Palestinian towns and villages into isolated enclaves, cutting off communities and families from each other, separating farmers from their land and Palestinians from their places of work, education and health care facilities and other essential services. This in order to facilitate passage between Israel and more than 50 illegal Israeli settlements located in the West Bank.

==== World Council of Churches ====
On February 20, 2004 the World Council of Churches demanded that Israel halt and reverse construction on the barrier and strongly condemned "violations of human rights and humanitarian consequences" that resulted from the construction of the barrier. While acknowledging Israel's serious security concerns and asserting that the construction of the barrier on its own territory would not have been a violation of international law, the statement called on "member Churches, Ecumenical Councils of Churches, Christian World Communions and specialized ministries of churches to condemn the wall as an act of unlawful annexation."

==== United States opinion ====
In 2003, when the Bush administration was considering reducing loan guarantees to Israel to discourage construction of the fence, then Secretary of State Colin Powell criticized the project. He said, "A nation is within its rights to put up a fence if it sees the need for one. However, in the case of the Israeli fence, we are concerned when the fence crosses over onto the land of others." Response from pro-Israel members of Congress criticized the possible reduction in loan assistance. For example, Senator Joe Lieberman, D-Conn., said, "The administration's threat to cut aid to Israel unless it stops construction of a security fence is a heavy-handed tactic." Lieberman criticized the threat as improper between allies, and continued, "The Israeli people have the right to defend themselves from terrorism, and a security fence may be necessary to achieve this."

On April 14, 2004, President of the United States George W. Bush said "In light of new realities on the ground, including already existing major Israeli population centers, it is unrealistic to expect that the outcome of final status negotiations will be a full and complete return to the armistice lines of 1949, and all previous efforts to negotiate a two-state solution have reached the same conclusion."

On May 25, 2005, Bush said, "I think the wall is a problem. And I discussed this with Ariel Sharon. It is very difficult to develop confidence between the Palestinians and Israel with a wall snaking through the West Bank." The following year, addressing the issue of the barrier as a future border, he said in a letter to Sharon on April 14, 2004 that it "should be a security rather than political barrier, should be temporary rather than permanent and therefore not prejudice any final status issues including final borders, and its route should take into account, consistent with security needs, its impact on Palestinians not engaged in terrorist activities." President Bush reiterated this position during a May 26, 2005 joint press conference with Palestinian leader Mahmoud Abbas in the Rose Garden.

In 2005, Hillary Clinton, at the time a U.S. Senator from New York, said she supports the separation fence Israel is building along the edges of the West Bank, and that the onus is on the Palestinian Authority to fight terrorism. "This is not against the Palestinian people," she said during a tour of a section of the barrier being built around Jerusalem. "This is against the terrorists. The Palestinian people have to help to prevent terrorism. They have to change the attitudes about terrorism."

In 2007, Senator Charles Schumer said: "As long as the Palestinians send terrorists onto school buses and to nightclubs to blow up people, Israel has no choice but to build the Security Wall."

==== European Union opinion ====
According to EU foreign policy chief Catherine Ashton, the EU considers the barrier to be illegal to the extent it is built on Palestinian land.

==== Canadian opinion ====
The Canadian Government recognizes Israel's right to protect its citizens from terrorist attacks, including through the restriction of access to its territory, and by building a barrier on its own territory for security purposes. However, it opposes the barrier's incursion into and the disruption of occupied territories. Considering the West Bank (including East Jerusalem) to be "occupied territory", the Canadian government considers the barrier to be contrary to international law under the Fourth Geneva Convention. It opposes the barrier and the expropriations and the demolition of houses and economic infrastructure preceding its construction.

=== Border opinions ===
Although the Barrier is purported to be a temporary defense against Palestinian attacks, many view it as significant in terms of future negotiations over Israel's final borders. Some speculate that because sections of the barrier are not built along the Green Line but in the West Bank, the real purpose is to acquire territory. Some people describe the barrier as the de facto future border of the State of Israel. James Zogby, president of the Arab American Institute, has said that the barrier has "unilaterally helped to demarcate the route for future Israeli control over huge West Bank settlement blocks and large swathes of West Bank land". According to B'Tselem, "the overall features of the separation barrier and the considerations that led to determination of the route give the impression that Israel is relying on security arguments to unilaterally establish facts on the ground ..." Chris McGreal in The Guardian writes that the barrier is, "evidently intended to redraw Israel's borders".

Some have speculated that the barrier will prejudice the outcome of border negotiations in favor of the Israelis. Yossi Klein Halevi, Israeli correspondent for The New Republic, writes that "[b]uilding over the green line, by contrast, reminds Palestinians that every time they've rejected compromise – whether in 1937, 1947, or 2000 – the potential map of Palestine shrinks... The fence is a warning: If Palestinians don't stop terrorism and forfeit their dream of destroying Israel, Israel may impose its own map on them... and, because Palestine isn't being restored but invented, its borders are negotiable."

The Israeli Deputy Defence Minister in 2000 stated that the barrier did not necessarily delineate the boundaries of a future Palestinian State.

On March 9, 2006, The New York Times quoted then-acting Israeli Prime Minister Ehud Olmert as stating that if his Kadima party wins the upcoming national elections, he would seek to set Israel's permanent borders by 2010, and that the boundary would run along or close to the barrier.

In 2012 it was reported that Israel had presented principles for drawing a border, which essentially propose to turn the West Bank separation barrier into the border with a future Palestinian state.

=== Relation to Israeli apartheid ===
Ahmad Hajihosseini, Observer for the Organization of the Islamic Conference (OIC), said that building and maintaining the wall is a crime of apartheid, isolating Palestinian communities in the West Bank and consolidating the annexation of Palestinian land by Israeli settlements.

Malcolm Hedding, a South African minister who worked against South African apartheid and executive director of the International Christian Embassy in Jerusalem, said that the West Bank barrier has nothing to do with apartheid but is instead about Israel's self-defense.

=== Art, books, film ===
The wall has been used as a canvas for many paintings and writings. It has been called the "world's largest protest graffiti". Some of these (but not all) have been removed by the Israelis, and sometimes by people on the Palestinian side.

Graffiti on the Palestinian side of the wall has been one of many forms of protest against its existence, demanding an end to the barrier, or criticizing its builders and its existence ("Welcome to the Ghetto-Abu Dis").

In August 2005, U.K. graffiti artist Banksy painted nine images on the Palestinian side of the barrier. He describes the barrier as "the ultimate activity holiday destination for graffiti writers", and returned in December 2007 with new images for "Santa's ghetto" in Bethlehem.

The exhibition "Santa's Ghetto in Bethlehem 2007" was co-organized by Banksy and a number of other artists with the aim of drawing attention to poverty in the West Bank and boosting tourism. On the wall, it features, among other images, a peace dove dressed in a bulletproof vest that is being aimed at, a young girl frisking a soldier, a donkey that is facing a soldier who is checking his identity papers, as well as a rat, one of Banksy's recurring themes, with a slingshot. One of Italian artist Blu's contributions to the project, featured a walled Christmas tree surrounded by a number of stumps. American contemporary artist Ron English pasted portraits of Mickey Mouse dressed as a Palestinian with the slogan "You are not in Disneyland anymore" on the wall. In an expression of frustration, Palestinian artist "Trash", glued the lower part of a leg on the wall that is appearing to kick through it. Although many artists received positive attention and reviews, some Palestinian people had negative opinions toward the artists' movement. A street artist from New York, Swoon, put two works on the Sentry towers in Bethlehem. She did not anticipate that some Palestinians would be opposed to her efforts. Swoon states that there was much enthusiasm from the kids of the Aida refugee camp, who were excited about the new artwork going on the wall. While the kids were excited, many elders believed that the children would grow up with the wrong, positive idea of the wall. One elder from the refugee camp claimed that "they don't necessarily want the kids to start viewing that area positively, and so they see the work as a thing of beauty, but in a place where beauty shouldn't be" (Parry, 10). Most international artists felt that they were creating "something for the people trapped behind wall, as well as creating an international symbol that would be broadcast around the world. [The elder man] wasn't speaking about international symbols, but about what it means to live in the shadow of an 80-foot guard tower" (Parry, 10). Although the graffiti artists felt that they were making a statement with their pieces that would help bring attention and help to the Palestinians, many Palestinians feel that it turns the wall into something beautiful. By painting on the wall, some Palestinians feel that the wall turns into a work of art instead "of an aggressive prison Wall" (Parry, 10). Of course, transforming the wall into something positive was not the intention of the artists. They thought that their work would bring out the oppressiveness and the emotion responses of the people affected by the wall.

On June 21, 2006, when he visited Israel to give a concert, Pink Floyd's Roger Waters wrote "Tear down the wall" on the wall, a phrase from the Pink Floyd album The Wall.

In 2007, with their project "Face2Face", French artists JR and "Marco", organized what was then (until at least 2010), considered to be the largest illegal photography exhibition ever made. In monumental formats, portraits of Israelis and Palestinians of similar professions and backgrounds were pasted next to each other on the wall. The idea was to highlight similarities rather than differences between the peoples. The project spanned over eight cities on both sides of the wall such as Bethlehem, Jericho, Ramallah and Jerusalem. The project was subsequently hosted by a number of exhibitions around the world including the Biennale di Venezia in Italy, the Foam-Musée de la Photographie in Amsterdam, the summer photography festival "Recontres d'Arles" in Arles, Southern France, Artitud in Berlin, Germany, Artcurial in Paris, France and the Rath Museum in Geneva, Switzerland. JR's work, including "Face2Face" is currently shown at the Watari-Um Museum in Tokyo, Japan.

As part of a Dutch–Palestinian collaboration, led by Palestinian activist Faris Arouri, Internet users were invited to submit 80-character long messages to be spray-painted on the security barrier in exchange for a donation of 30 Euro. Messages that included or incited racism, hate, violence or pornography were rejected. About two-thirds of the money raised was donated to social, cultural and educational grassroots projects such as the renovation of the Peace and Freedom Youth Forum's open Youth Center in Bir Zeit. When the project was ended, it was claimed to have reached 550,000,000 people worldwide and placed 1,498 messages on the wall. One of the organizers of "Send a message", Justus van Oel, a Dutch theater director, commissioned South African anti-apartheid activist and theologian Farid Esack to compose a letter to be placed on the wall in 2009. The result was a 1,998-word letter in English written in a single line and stretching over 2.6 km (1.6 mi) near the town of Ramallah, comparing the situation in the Palestinian territories to the South African apartheid era.

The British photojournalist William Parry has recently published a book entitled "Against the Wall". The wall was the primary focus of British playwright David Hare's dramatic monologue Wall, which is being adapted as a live-action/animated feature-length documentary by the National Film Board of Canada, to be completed in 2014.

The barrier is also the subject of the 2011 documentary film, 5 Broken Cameras, which documents the story of Emad Burnat, a Palestinian farmer of the Palestinian village of Bil'in, who had intended to use his videocamera to record vignettes of his son's childhood but ended up filming the resistance movement to the Israeli separation wall that was erected through his village. This award-winning film tells the story of the nonviolent protests of the village residents and the international and Israeli activists who join them, and of how in the course of his filming one after another of his cameras is shot or smashed.

== Other barriers ==
Two similar barriers, the Israeli Gaza Strip barrier and the Israeli-built 7–9 meters (23–30 ft) wall separating Gaza from Egypt (temporarily breached on January 23, 2008), which is currently under Egyptian control, are also controversial.

== See also ==
- International law and the Arab–Israeli conflict
- Iron Wall, also known as We and the Arabs, an essay written by Ze'ev Jabotinsky, founder of Revisionist Zionism, while working as a journalist for the Russian-speaking press
- Lemon Tree – Israeli film about the impact of the barrier
- Tegart's wall – border barrier in British Mandate Palestine
- Bremer wall – US-given name for Israeli-type of prefab barrier
- List of walls, particularly List of walls#Walls in use today
  - Moroccan Western Sahara Wall – a separation barrier dividing Moroccan-controlled and Sahrawi-controlled parts of Western Sahara
