= Mansfield School District =

Mansfield School District may refer to:

- Mansfield School District (Arkansas), based in Mansfield, Arkansas.
- Mansfield School District (Connecticut), based in Mansfield, Connecticut.
- Mansfield School District (Massachusetts), based in Mansfield, Massachusetts.
- Mansfield Public Schools, based in Mansfield Township, Burlington County, New Jersey.
- Mansfield Township School District, based in Mansfield Township, Warren County, New Jersey.
- Mansfield City School District, based in Mansfield, Ohio.
- Mansfield Independent School District, based in Mansfield, Texas.
- Mansfield School District (Washington), based in Mansfield, Washington.
