= Flying Balloon Girl =

Mural in Palestine by Banksy

- Artist: Banksy
- Year: 2005

Flying Balloon Girl, also known as Balloon Debate, is a 2005 stencil mural in the West Bank by the graffiti artist Banksy, depicting a young girl holding a bunch of seven balloons floating above the 8 meter-high wall built around the Palestinian enclave near the Qalandia checkpoint.

It represents perhaps the first piece of West Bank Wall graffiti art to have received international acclaim, serving as a form of "transnational and experiential empathy". In its original context, the artwork is thought to refer to the Palestinian right to freedom of movement and possibly to the Palestinian right of return.

It has been described as: "poignantly simple", with its message "as basic as the artwork: through magic realism and notions of childhood innocence, the young girl embodies a dreamy, supernatural hope as the balloons lift her up from her stark surroundings." As such its message has become universal, as John Lennon, associate professor of English at the University of South Florida, describes:

As an image alone, though, there is of course no connection between this girl and the Palestinian desire to return. Instead, Flying Balloon Girl represents a universal desire to magically escape life's difficulties. A decade after Banksy placed the stencil on the Separation Wall, his image has become not a statement on Palestinian rights but a familiar image of the Banksy brand.

== See also ==
- List of works by Banksy
- 2005 in art
