= Christian Action for Israel =

Christian Zionist group

Christian Action for Israel was a Christian Zionist group established in Geneva in 1973. The organization's self-described goals were to, "pray for Israel.. (and) promote tourism, trade, investment and afforestation... (and oppose) anti-Semitism." Christian Action supported, "a peaceful secure Jerusalem united under Jewish control."

The organization was active in a number of countries, including Britain, Canada, and South Africa.

In 1975 a South African branch of Christian Action for Israel was founded in Cape Town by the late Basil Jacobs, a steel merchant and devout Christian, Claude Duvernoy, a French Presbyterian Minister living in Jerusalem. In the years 1991–2000 the South African chapter was headed by Malcolm Hedding, a South African-born anti-apartheid activist and evangelical minister. Hedding then spent 11 years as head of the International Christian Embassy Jerusalem.
