= Hedding, New Jersey =

Populated place in Burlington County, New Jersey, US

- Unincorporated community
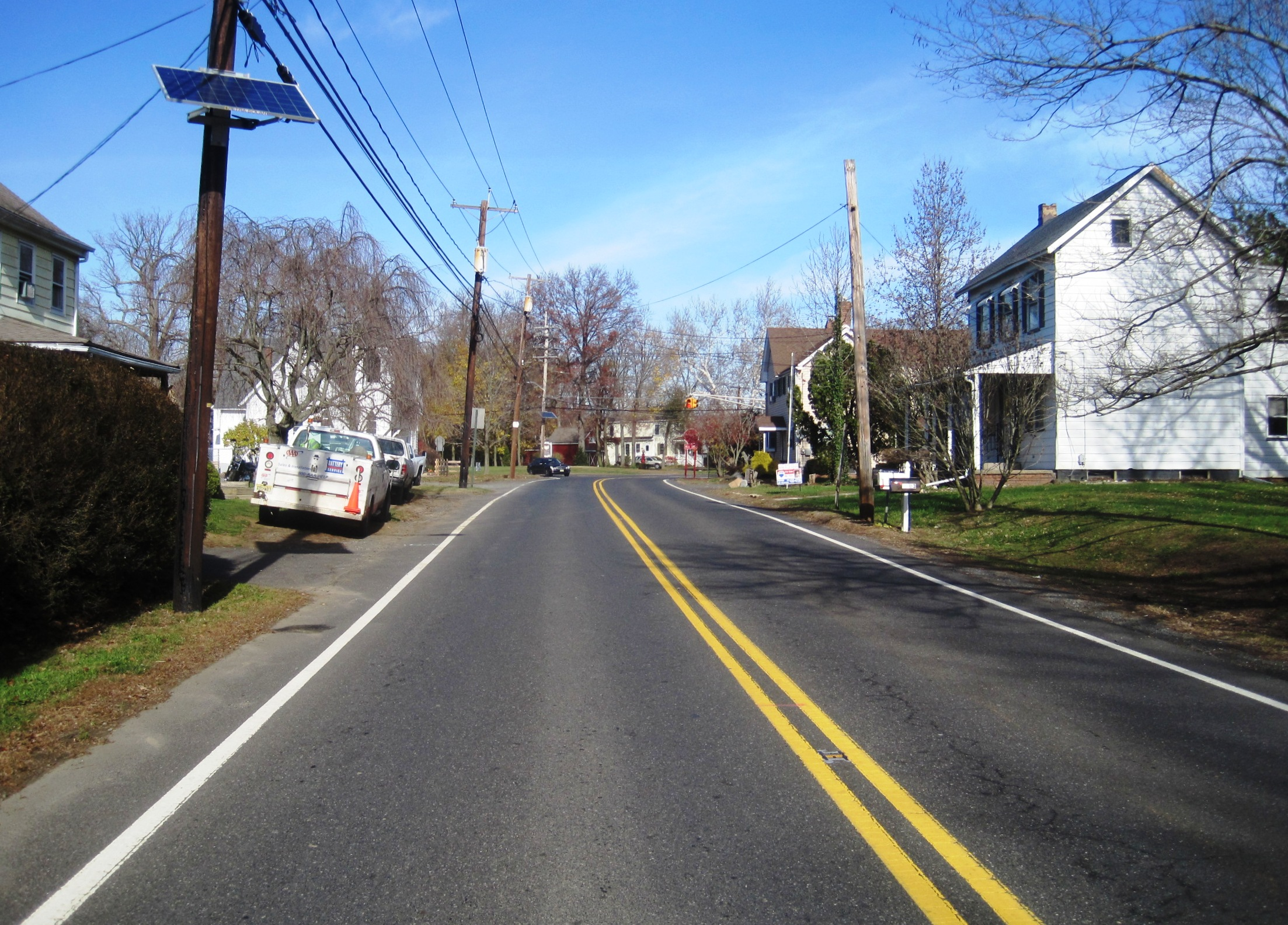
- Looking north along Old York Road (CR 660)

- Location in Burlington County (Inset: Burlington County in New Jersey) Hedding (New Jersey) Hedding (the United States)
- Coordinates: 40°06′28″N 74°44′38″W
- Country: United States
- State: New Jersey
- County: Burlington
- Township: Mansfield
- Named after: Elijah Hedding
- Elevation: 82 ft (25 m)
- Time zone: UTC−05:00 (Eastern (EST))
  - Summer (DST): UTC−04:00 (Eastern (EDT))
- Area codes: 609, 640
- GNIS feature ID: 877031

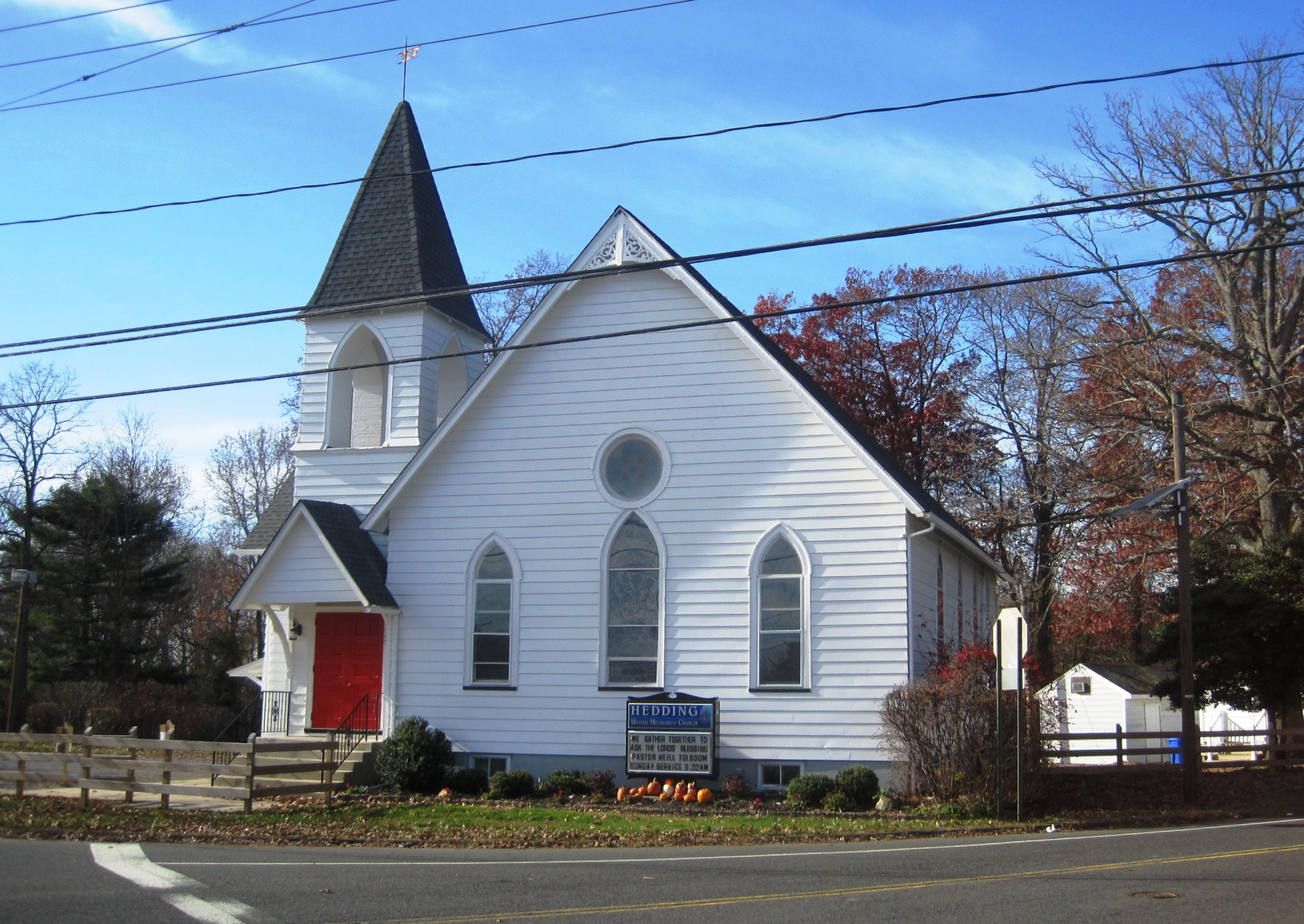
Hedding United Methodist Church

Hedding is an unincorporated community located within Mansfield Township, in Burlington County, in the U.S. state of New Jersey. From 1793–1813, the area was known as Bryant's Tavern after William Byrant of Brian the proprietor. In 1817, the name was changed to Three Tuns as a sign before the hostelry depicted three casks or tuns. In 1847, a church was built which was named Hedding Methodist Episcopal Church in honor of Elijah Hedding, a Bishop of this denomination. Three Tuns remained as the name of the area until 1920 when it was changed to Hedding, named after the church. The community itself is made up of single-family houses clustered around the main intersection in the settlement, Old York Road (County Route 660) and Kinkora Road / Columbus Hedding Road (CR 678); the remainder of the area consists of farmland. Interstate 295 runs southeast of the community but no interchanges provide direct access to it.
