= West Bank Wall graffiti art =

Street art on the Israeli West Bank barrier

West Bank Wall graffiti art is street art on the walled sections of the Israeli West Bank barrier, by a wide range of international and Palestinian artists. The wall is 8 to 10 metres (26 to 33 ft) tall, and is easily accessible to artists as it frequently divides urban areas. The graffiti is on the Palestinian side of the wall and primarily expresses anti-wall sentiments.

== Description of the graffiti ==
The walled section of the Israeli West Bank barrier, known as the West Bank Wall, is 8 to 10 metres (26 to 33 ft) tall, providing artists a large, blank canvas. The graffiti is on the Palestinian side of the wall and primarily expresses anti-wall sentiments.

The graffiti, written in both English and Arabic, includes "flags and fists, slogans and insults, statements of pain and loss", serving as a "visual testimony" to the suffering of Palestinians under the Israeli occupation of the West Bank. The diversity and amount of street art has been described as "initially overwhelming" with "layers upon layers of street art on the Wall" after almost two decades. Most of the graffiti consists of amateur tags without decorations.

In 2017, prevalent text on the wall included "Palestine", "Free Palestine", "Peace", "Love", "Justice", "Hope", "Freedom", "Unity", "Solidarity", "Friendship", "Apartheid Wall", "God is Love", "God Bless Palestine", "Jesus Loves You", John 3:16, "Christmas", and criticism of US presidents and the names of visitors and their countries.

== Tourism and reception ==
The graffiti has become a tourist attraction, particularly around the Bethlehem area, epitomised by The Walled Off Hotel by graffiti artist Banksy. During Banksy's 2005 trip to the West Bank, a Palestinian man acknowledged both the beauty and irony of Banksy's work, telling him: "We don't want this wall to be beautiful. We hate it. Go home."

== Artists ==
Similar to Berlin Wall graffiti art, much of the artwork is unclaimed by artists and remains anonymous. In 2005, Banksy became the first major international artist to add graffiti to the wall; his stencilled Flying Balloon Girl was considered to serve as a form of "transnational and experiential empathy".

Banksy was followed by many others, including Blu, Ericailcane, FAILE, JR, Know Hope, Paul Insect, Ron English, Sam3, Swoon and Lushsux.

=== List of known graffiti artists ===
- Banksy
- FAILE
- Ron English
- Jonathan Kis-Lev
- Blu
- Ericailcane
- JR
- Know Hope
- Paul Insect
- Sam3
- Swoon
- Lushsux

== Gallery ==
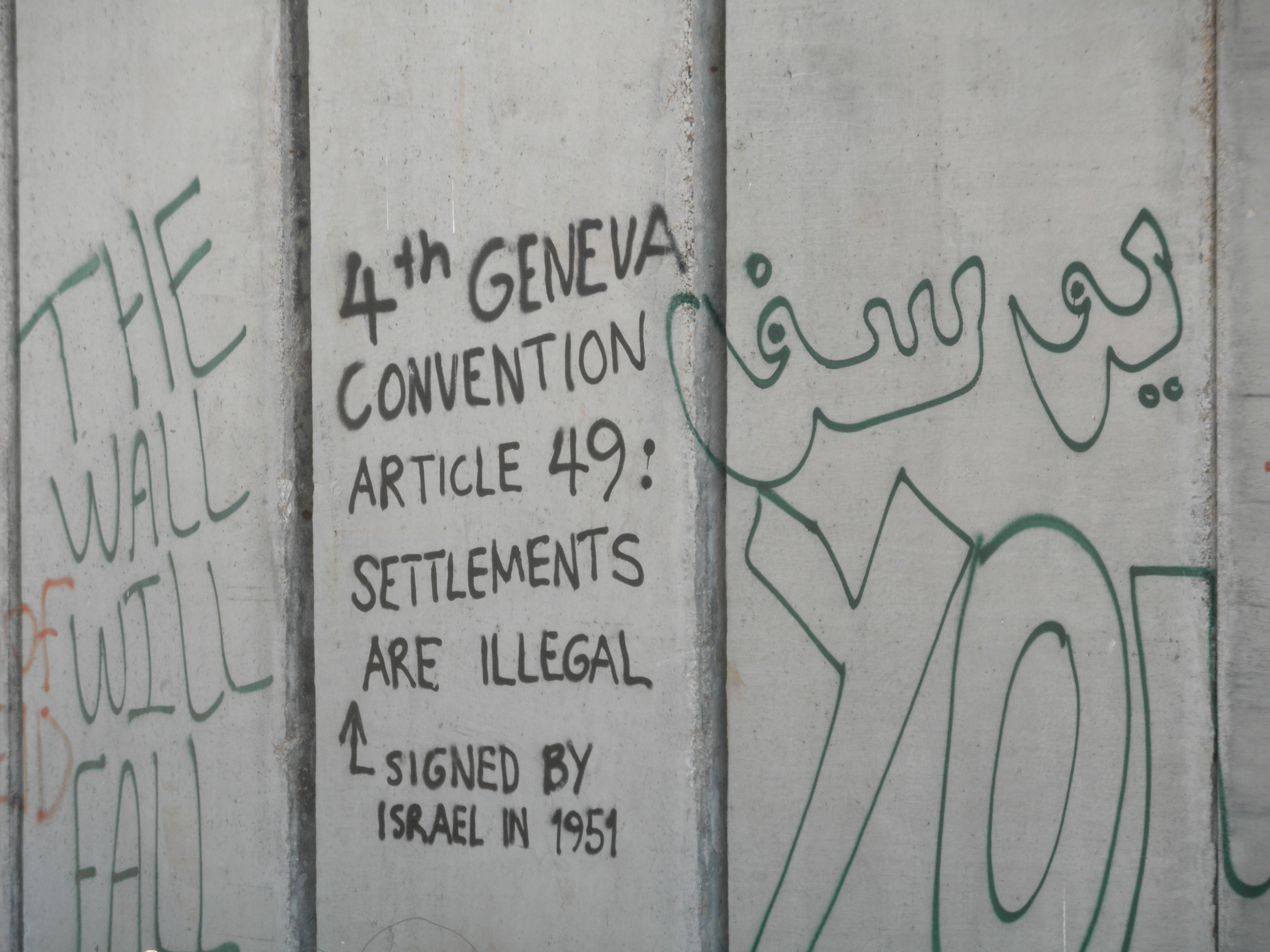
Graffiti near Ni'lin, referencing the Fourth Geneva Convention

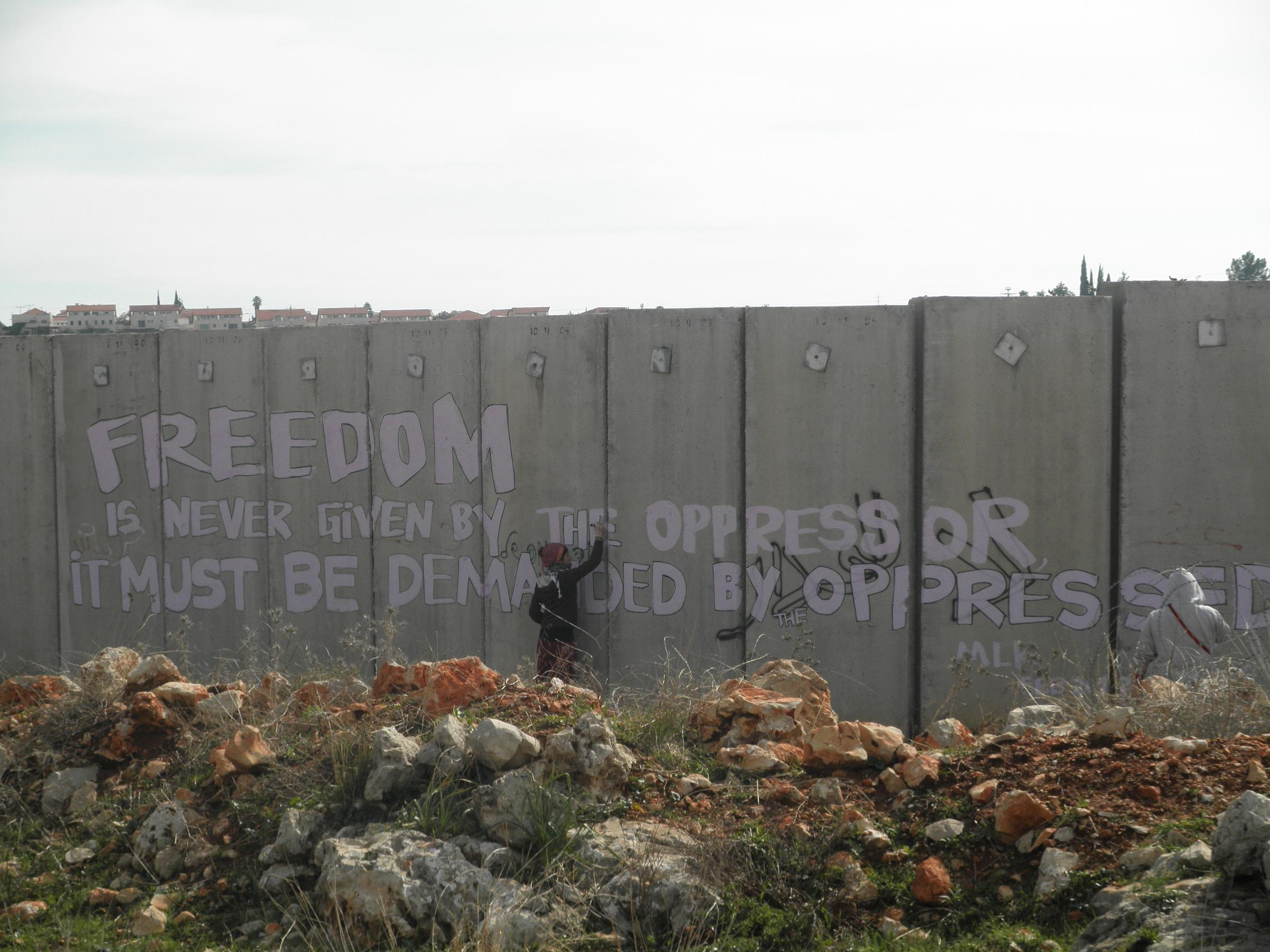
Graffiti near Ni'lin, with a quote from Martin Luther King's Letter from Birmingham Jail

== See also ==
- Culture of Palestine
- Street art in Israel

== Bibliography ==
- Lennon, J. (2022). Conflict Graffiti: From Revolution to Gentrification. University of Chicago Press. ISBN 978-0-226-81567-1.
- Davies, Dominic (2017-08-18). ""Walls of Freedom": Street Art and Structural Violence in the Global City". Rupkatha Journal on Interdisciplinary Studies in Humanities. 9 (2). Aesthetics Media Services. doi:10.21659/rupkatha.v9n2.02. ISSN 0975-2935.
- Larkin, Craig. “JERUSALEM’S SEPARATION WALL AND GLOBAL MESSAGE BOARD: GRAFFITI, MURALS, AND THE ART OF SUMUD.” The Arab Studies Journal, vol. 22, no. 1, 2014, pp. 134–69, http://www.jstor.org/stable/24877902. Accessed 15 May 2022.
