= Qalandia Camp =

Refugee camp in the West Bank, State of Palestine

- Refugee Camp

Arabic transcription(s)
  - Arabic: مخيّم قلنديا
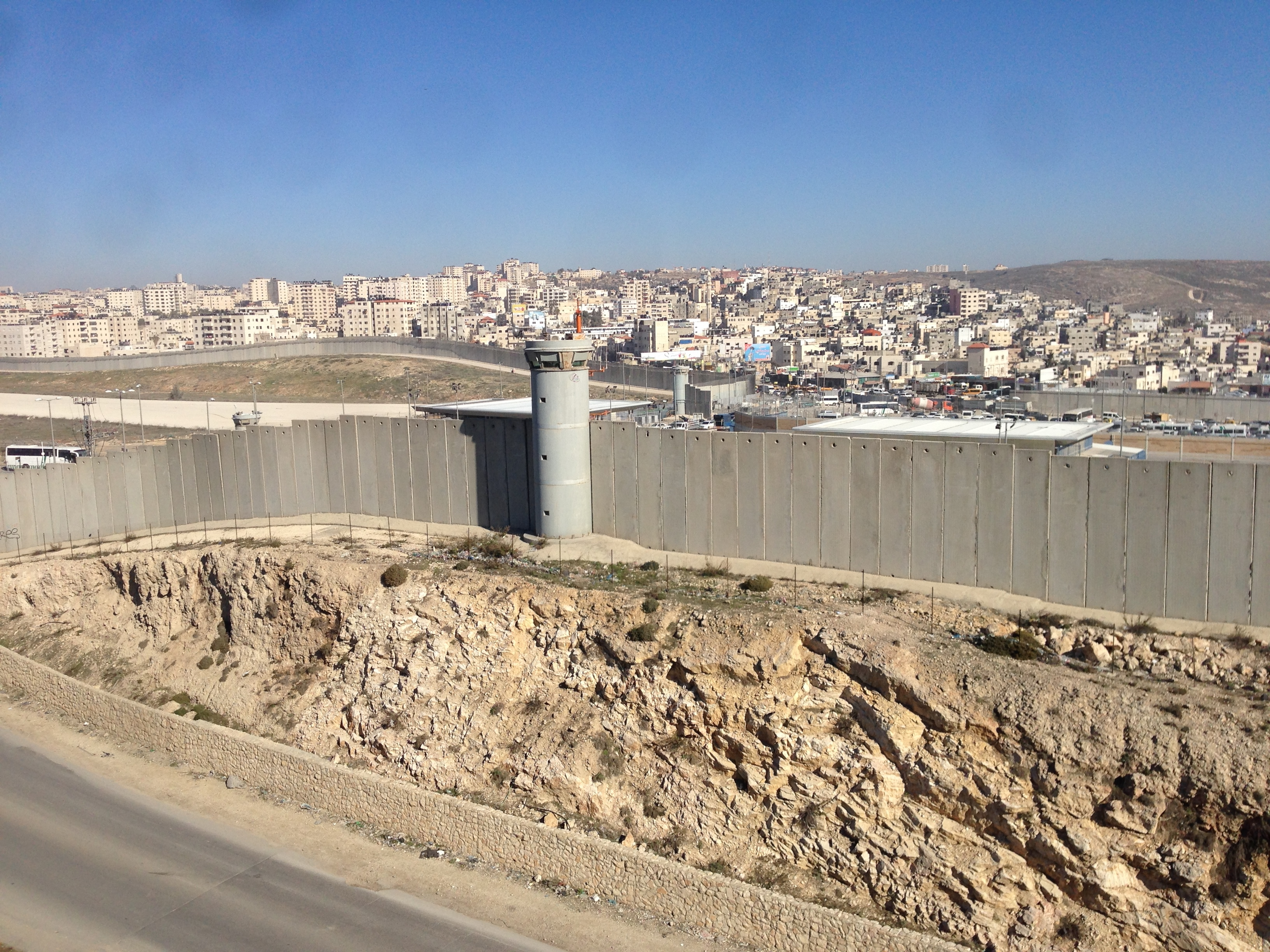
- Israeli watchtowers and wall at the checkpoint of the Palestinian refugee camp of Qalandia, 2014

- Location of Kalandia Camp within Palestine
- Coordinates: 31°51′53″N 35°13′45″E
- State: State of Palestine
- Governorate: Quds

Government
  - Type: Refugee Camp (from 1949)

Area
  - Total: 0.353 km^{2} (0.136 sq mi)

Population (2017)
  - Total: 8,336
  - Density: 23,600/km^{2} (61,200/sq mi)

Qalandia Camp is a Palestinian refugee camp established in 1949 by the Red Cross on land leased from Jordan. It covers 353 dunums (0.353 km^{2}; 35.3 ha) as of 2006 and had a population of 8,336 in 2017. Israeli authorities consider it part of Greater Jerusalem, and it remains under their control.
