= Malcolm Hedding =

Malcolm Hedding (born 1952) is a South African anti-apartheid activist, theologian, evangelical minister, and executive director of the International Christian Embassy in Jerusalem (ICEJ).

== Biography ==
Hedding was born in 1952 into a British descent family that had settled in the Eastern Cape region. His father, Guy Usher Hedding, managed a gold mine.

Hedding entered the ministry in the early 1970s as a member of the Assemblies of God of Southern Africa. As a young ordained minister with the South African Assemblies of God, Hedding confronted the apartheid system from the pulpit and was forced to flee his homeland.

Between 1986 and 1989, Malcolm a pastor of the Jerusalem Christian Assembly. During this period, he also functioned as the Chaplain for the International Christian Embassy in Jerusalem.

As a Christian Zionist, Malcolm served from 1991–2000 as chairman of "Christian Action for Israel," a biblical Zionist organization in South Africa.

Malcolm Hedding has been involved with the work of the International Christian Embassy Jerusalem (ICEJ) since 1981 and has been executive director since 2000. On 27 May 2011, it was announced that he would be stepping down as executive director as of 31 July 2011.

== Views on Israel ==
Malcolm is currently a Christian Zionist leader based in Jerusalem who is challenging the branding of Israel with the "apartheid" label. Hedding believes the Israeli barrier fence has "nothing to do with apartheid and everything to do with Israel's self-defense". He said that Israel has proven its desire to reach an accommodation with the Palestinians while granting political rights to its own Arab citizens within a liberal democratic system, but that the Palestinians remain committed to Israel's destruction. By contrast, he says, it was a tiny minority in South Africa that held power and once democracy came, the Nationalist Party that had dominated the masses disappeared.

According to Hedding, "Evangelical support for Israel is founded not on a prophecy, but on a promise, [...] It is the promise God made to Abraham that the Jewish people would receive the land of Canaan for the sake of world redemption. The Jewish people became servants of the lord, to bring an understanding of revelation of God and his redemptive purpose to the world. Evangelicals defend their right to live in peace and security in land of Canaan, support that comes out of a sense of gratitude for what we've received."

Hedding believes Israel proven its desire to reach a settlement with the Palestinians, while granting political rights to its Arab citizens within a democratic system. Nevertheless, he says that the Palestinians remain committed to Israel's destruction.

== Books ==
- The Basis of Christian Support for Israel, International Christian Embassy Jerusalem-USA, 2005, ISBN 978-0-9765297-0-5
- The Great Covenants of the Bible, ISBN 978-0-9765297-2-9
- Hear our cry, Struik Christian Books, 1993, ISBN 978-1-86823-069-3
- For Zion's sake, Contact Publications, 1986, ISBN 978-0-620-07776-7
- Understanding Revelation, Intend Publishing, 2013, ISBN 978-1-61718-007-1
