= Elijah Hedding =

American bishop of the Methodist Episcopal Church

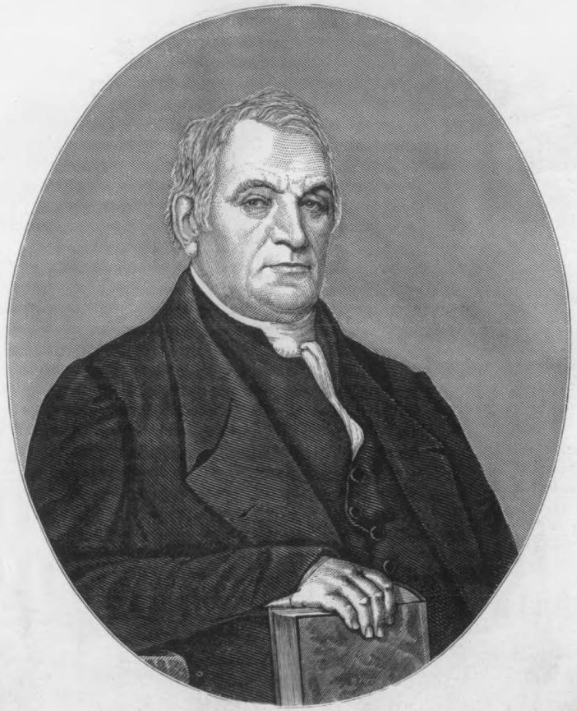
- Born: June 7, 1780; Pine Plains, New York
- Died: April 9, 1852 (aged 71); Poughkeepsie, New York
- Occupation: Clergyman

Elijah Hedding (June 7, 1780 – April 9, 1852) was an American bishop of the Methodist Episcopal Church, elected in 1824.

== Early life ==
Hedding was born near Pine Plains in Dutchess County, New York, to parents of English origin. He was trained in prayer by his mother, who was brought into the church under circuit preacher Benjamin Abbot. It is said that when he was only three years old, his mother taught him the first principles of the Christian faith and he felt the fear of God. For several years he practiced secret prayer.

When Abbott began preaching in the neighborhood, his ministry resulted in the conversion not only of Hedding's mother, but his grandmother and other relatives as well, all of whom joined the Methodist Episcopal Church. Hedding attended public worship with his mother and remained with her in class-meeting after the preaching.

Bishop Matthew Simpson related one occasion in Hedding's young life of Christian faith:

after Mr. Abbott had spoken to the class, he went to little Elijah and said, "Well, my boy, do you think you are a sinner?" He replied, "Yes, sir." Mr. Abbott then, with vehemence and loud voice, said, "There's many a boy in hell not as old as you are," and most impressively exhorted him to seek religion. Bishop Hedding says of this event, "It not only frightened me but produced real religious concern, as I doubt not it was accompanied by the operation of God's Holy Spirit."

When he was about 10 years old, Hedding's parents moved to Vermont. When he was about 15 or 16, a Methodist family from Connecticut moved into the neighborhood and began holding meetings in their home. There was singing and praying, and Hedding, being a good reader, was appointed to read one of John Wesley's sermons or a portion of Baxter's Call. These meetings were kept up regularly until 1798, when this home became a Methodist preaching place on a regular circuit.

The woman of the house, reportedly a Mrs. Bushnell, used to frequently talk with young Hedding privately on the subject of the Christian religion. He is reported to have said about those conversations (quoted by Bishop Simpson):

Her conversation, more than anything else, was the means of my seeking religion. After one of these conversations, on my way home I turned into a grove and kneeled by the side of a great tree and covenanted with God to part with all my idols and seek salvation with all my heart.

About six weeks after this, Hedding remained in class-meeting after preaching, when the preacher and brethren, seeing his distress, kneeled in interceded for him. During the meeting he received spiritual comfort and gave his name as a probationer in the Methodist Episcopal Church on December 27, 1798.

At the time of his awakening, Hedding received some comfort but he had not a clear consciousness of his acceptance and conversion. He says of this, quoted by Bishop Simpson:

About six weeks after this, while conversing with a brother about the Witness of the Spirit, the light of the Spirit broke in upon my mind as clear and perceptible as the sun when it comes from behind a cloud, testifying that I 'was' born of God, and that it was done at the time before named, when my guilt was removed and I found peace in believing.

== Circuit riding and ordained ministry ==
Though only licensed as an exhorter, in 1799 Hedding supplied the place of Lorenzo Dow who had left his circuit. In 1801 Hedding was admitted on probation in the Newark Annual Conference. He was ordained, both deacon and elder, by Bishop Francis Asbury.

Hedding served a variety of appointments, as a pioneer circuit preacher or a city pastor. In 1807 he was appointed the presiding elder of the New Hampshire district. In 1811 he was stationed in Boston. In 1817 he was again a presiding elder, this time in the Portland district. He was subsequently appointed to Lynn Common, to Boston, and then the Boston district. "Father Taylor", the noted sailor preacher, was converted under Hedding at the Bromfield Street M.E. Church in Boston.

== Episcopal ministry ==
Hedding was elected and consecrated as a bishop of the Methodist Episcopal Church at the general conference which met in Baltimore in May 1824. For nearly 28 years he performed the duties of his office with great ability.

Bishop Matthew Simpson offered this assessment of Hedding's episcopacy:

He was remarkable for promptness in duty, wisdom in council, strict integrity, and deep piety. Anxious days and sleepless nights and strong intercessions with God showed his deep solicitude for the prosperity of the churches. His pulpit power, his excellence as an officer, his administrative ability, gave him prominence in the affections and confidence of the M.E. Church.

== Faith in the face of death ==
Hedding suffered in his early years from violent attacks of inflammatory rheumatism. He became seriously ill in 1848 but continued to work. He said, "I hope for, and expect to receive, salvation through our Lord Jesus Christ."

Hedding's last illness was protracted and severe. Nevertheless, his mental powers were clear and vigorous to the last. About 10 days before his death he said, quoted by Bishop Simpson:

With the stroke God gave me wonderful grace, and it has been with me ever since. Not a day, not an hour, not a moment have I had any doubt or tormenting fear of death. I have been times so that it was doubtful whether I would live five minutes, but all was bright and glorious. But to-day I have been wonderfully blessed.

I was reflecting upon the wonder of God's mercy,--how a just and infinite and holy God could take such vile creatures to dwell with Him in so holy a place; so unworthy, so sinful, so polluted. I thought of His great mercy to me,--how much He had done for me,--and I had such glorious views of the atonement of Christ,--His sufferings and the glory that should follow,--that my soul was filled in a wonderful manner.

I have served God more than fifty years. I have generally had peace, but I never saw such glory before, such light, and such gloriousness, such beauty! Oh, I want to tell it to all the world! Oh, had I a trumpet voice,

After a protracted illness, Hedding died on April 9, 1852, in Poughkeepsie, New York. He was buried in a rural cemetery on the east side of the Hudson, below Poughkeepsie.

In 1862, a decade after his death, a Methodist campmeeting ground in Epping, New Hampshire, was named in his honor.

== Selected writings ==
- Sermon: "The Supreme Deity of Christ", New England Conference, Bath, Maine, 1822. (also as a 20 pp. pamphlet in 1829, and later published by the New York Conference, as well).
- Sermon in The Methodist Preacher, Ebenezer Ireson, Editor, 1831.
- Sermon: "Self-Government", in The Methodist Preacher, S.W. Willson and Ebenezer Ireson, Editors, 1832. (previously published as a pamphlet in 1831).
- "Address" at Oneida and Genesee Conferences on "the Duty of the President of an Annual Conference; on the Rights and Powers of Such a Conference and on the Principles and History of Said Church, on the Act of Holding Slaves", also "Thoughts on Evil Speaking and a Report on Slavery of the Genesee Annual Conference", pamphlet, 28 pp., 1837; (also in Elliott, C., History of the Great Secession, Document 27, 1855.
- Discourse on "the Administration of the Discipline", delivered in 1841 at Philadelphia, Newark, Providence, and Maine Conferences, and published in miniature book form by request of these bodies, 1842 and 1845.
- Sermon: "Christ the Theme of the Prophets", in Clark, D.W., The Methodist Pulpit, 1848.
- Special Salvation, pamphlet, 29 pp., 1850.
- Sermon: "Self-Government", in Sermons on Miscellaneous Subjects, Cincinnati, 1847; also in The Methodist Preacher, Augurn, 1852.

== Biographies ==
- Stevens, A., Memorials of the Introduction of Methodism into the Eastern States 1848.
- McClintock, John, Biographical Sketches 1853.
- Clark, D.W., Life and Times of Rev. Elijah Hedding, D.D. (introd. by E.S. Janes), 1855.
- Hibbard, R.F., Startling Disclosures Concerning the Death of John N. Maffitt: A Review of Bishop Hedding's Decision, pamphlet, 1856.
- Ludlow, H.G. and Kilbourn, David, a sketch (with letters of Tobias Spicer) in Annals of the American Pulpit W.B. Sprague, 1861.
- Pierce, B.K., a sketch in Lives of Methodist Bishops Flood and Hamilton, 1882.

== See also ==
- List of bishops of the United Methodist Church

== Sources ==
- Leete, Frederick DeLand, Methodist Bishops (Nashville, Tenn., The Methodist Publishing House, 1948).
- Short, Roy Hunter, Chosen to be Consecrated: The Bishops of The Methodist Church, 1784–1968 (Lake Junaluska, N.C.)
- General Commission on Archives and History of the United Methodist Church (1976).
