= Battle of Short Hills =

June 1777 battle of the American Revolutionary War

Coordinates: 40.750°N 74.332°W

- Part of the American Revolutionary War
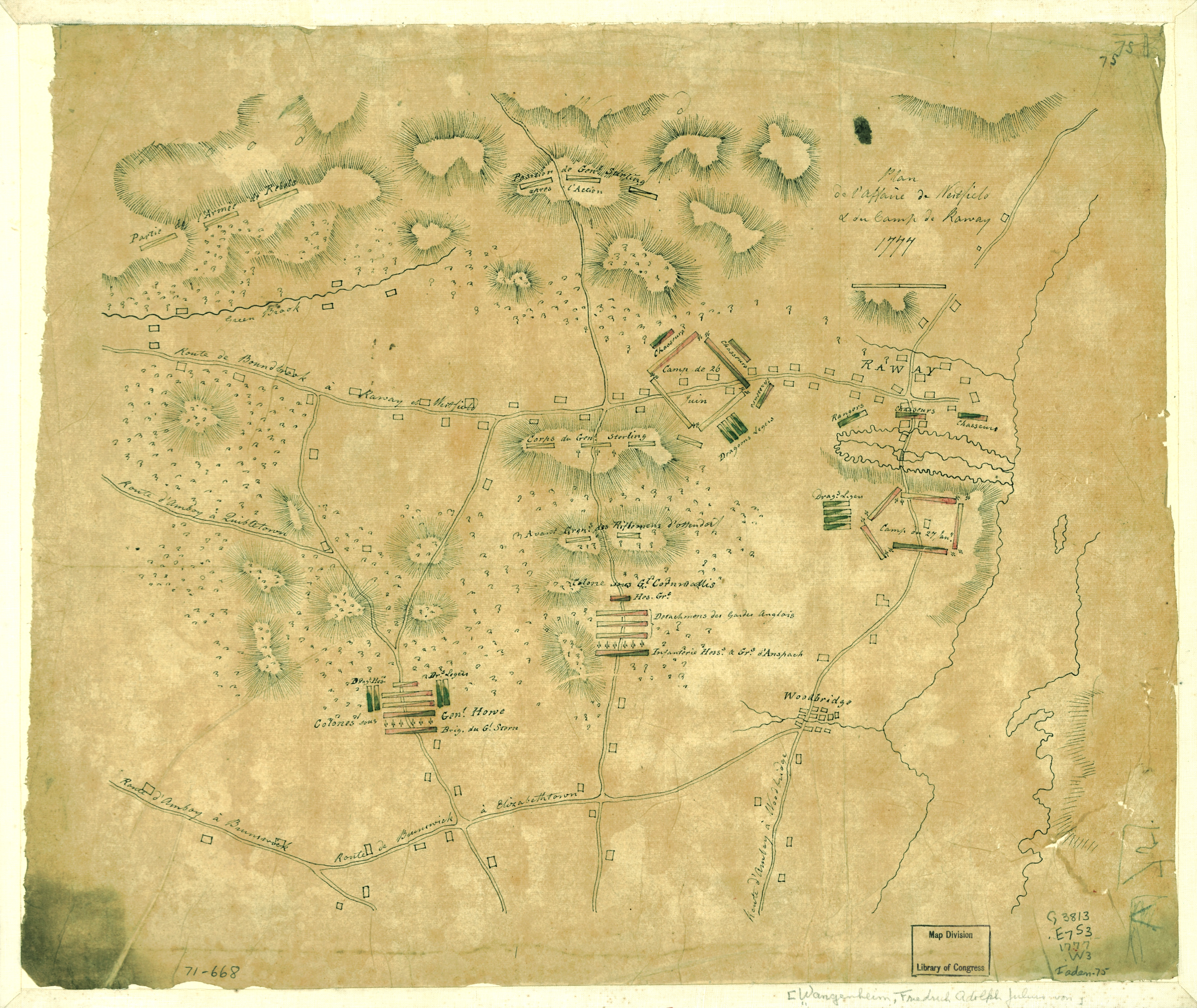
- Map drawn by the Hessian officer Friedrich Adam Julius von Wangenheim showing the battle positions
| Date | June 26, 1777 |
| Location | Scotch Plains, New Jersey |
| Result | British victory |

Belligerents
| United States | Great Britain: Hesse; Brunswick |

Commanders and leaders
| (United States) Lord Stirling | (Kingdom of Great Britain) Sir William Howe (Kingdom of Great Britain) Lord Cornwallis (Kingdom of Great Britain) John Vaughan |

Strength
| 2,500 | 11,000 |

Casualties and losses
| Killed and wounded unknown 70 captured | 5 killed 30 wounded |

The Battle of the Short Hills (also known as the Battle of Metuchen Meetinghouse and other names) was a conflict between a Continental Army force commanded by Brigadier General William Alexander ("Lord Stirling"), and an opposing British force commanded by Lieutenant General William Howe. The battle took place on June 26, 1777, at Scotch Plains and Edison, New Jersey, during the American Revolutionary War.

Despite the name, no fighting occurred in modern-day Short Hills, a section of Millburn.

In mid-June General Howe marched most of his army into central New Jersey in an attempt to lure George Washington's Continental Army to where it might be better attacked than its defensive position in the Watchung Mountains. When Washington refused to abandon his position, Howe returned to Amboy on June 22. Washington's forward divisions, including that of Lord Stirling, shadowed this British movement, and Washington moved his main army out of the hills Howe seized the opportunity and on June 26 marched two columns of troops out in an attempt to cut Washington off from the high ground. The troops skirmished with Lord Stirling's troops and eventually engaged in a pitched battle in Scotch Plains. Stirling's outnumbered force retreated, but Washington, alerted to the British movement, had by then retreated to the hills.

== Background ==
In March 1776 the British forces of Lieutenant General William Howe withdrew from Boston after Major General George Washington fortified high ground threatening the city and its harbor. With the army augmented by reinforcements from Europe, General Howe captured New York City and forced Washington to retreat all the way across New Jersey. At the end of 1776, Washington crossed the Delaware River and defeated Hessian forces at the Battle of Trenton on December 26, 1776, and eventually regained control of most of New Jersey. Both armies then settled into winter quarters and engaged in a war of skirmishes during the winter months of early 1777.

General Howe spent the winter planning a campaign to capture the seat of the rebel Congress, Philadelphia. The constant skirmishing throughout the winter had taken its toll on his troops stationed in New Jersey, and even a major attack on the Continental Army outpost at Bound Brook in April had not been entirely successful. Howe apparently did not divulge his plans or his intended route to Philadelphia to many people, and General Washington did not know Howe's intentions although Philadelphia was one target that he suspected interested Howe. On May 29, Washington moved most of his army from its winter quarters near Morristown to a strong position at Middlebrook in the Watchung Mountains from which he could observe and interfere with British moves toward Philadelphia.

Historians who mention this battle only occasionally give it a name. It is often called "Short Hills" even though the battle took place primarily in present-day Edison and Scotch Plains, New Jersey. Historians also give the battle other names. David Martin calls it "Flat Hills" or "Metuchen Meeting House," and one British regimental history refers to it by "Westfield".

== Prelude ==
On June 9, Howe began moving troops from Staten Island to Perth Amboy. On June 11, almost of his entire army moved up the roads along the Raritan River to New Brunswick. Washington's intelligence reports indicated that Howe had left behind equipment needed for crossing the Delaware River and was unlikely to be heading for Philadelphia. Washington, as a precautionary measure, called out the militia in southern New Jersey. On June 14, Howe's army marched again toward Somerset Court House (present-day Millstone). Apparently seeking to draw Washington into battle on open terrain, Howe remained there five days. Washington refused to move out of the hills, and on June 19, Howe began the march back to Perth Amboy, which he reached on June 22 after he had completely evacuated New Brunswick.

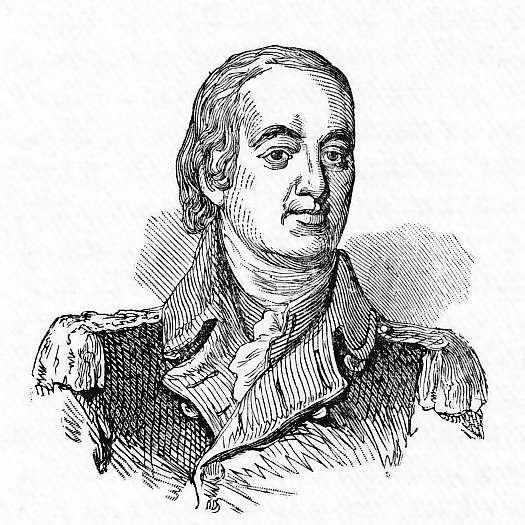
Brigadier General William Alexander, engraving from Harper's Encyclopedia, 1905

After refusing to fall for Howe's trap, Washington followed the retreating British, brought his army down from Middlebrook to Quibbletown, and sent a strong forward detachment under Brigadier General William Alexander also known as "Lord Stirling," to the Scotch Plains area north of New Brunswick, to cover his left flank and to harass the British. Stirling's command, numbering about 2,500, comprised William Maxwell's New Jersey brigade, Thomas Conway's Pennsylvania brigade, Daniel Morgan's Corps of Riflemen and Ottendorf's Corps. Maxwell's brigade consisted of the 1st to the 4th New Jersey Continentals and Oliver Spencer's Additional Regiment, and Conway's consisted of the 3rd, 6th, 9th, and 12th Pennsylvania Continentals. Ottendorf's Corps was named for its principal recruiter, the German mercenary Nicholas Dietrich, Baron de Ottendorf, but was commanded by Charles Armand, a French soldier of fortune who was given its command in May 1777 after Ottendorf had abruptly left the army.

Howe took advantage of Washington's movement and launched a sudden attack against Lord Stirling's position that was meant to devastate Stirling's forces. Howe cut off Washington's retreat to Middlebrook and engage the Americans in a pitched battle on relatively open terrain. At 1:00 a.m. on June 26, Howe marched two columns of troops out of Perth Amboy. The first column, under the command of Lieutenant General Charles Cornwallis, consisted of several companies of Hessian jägers; three battalions of Hessian and one of British grenadiers; mounted Hessian chasseurs; and some British dragoons from the 16th Light Dragoons, a battalion from the Brigade of Guards, and the Loyalist provincial unit of Queen's Rangers. The second column was under the command of Major General John Vaughan, who was accompanied by General Howe, and consisted of jäger companies from Hesse-Kassel and Ansbach-Bayreuth and battalions of British light infantry and grenadiers.

== Battle ==
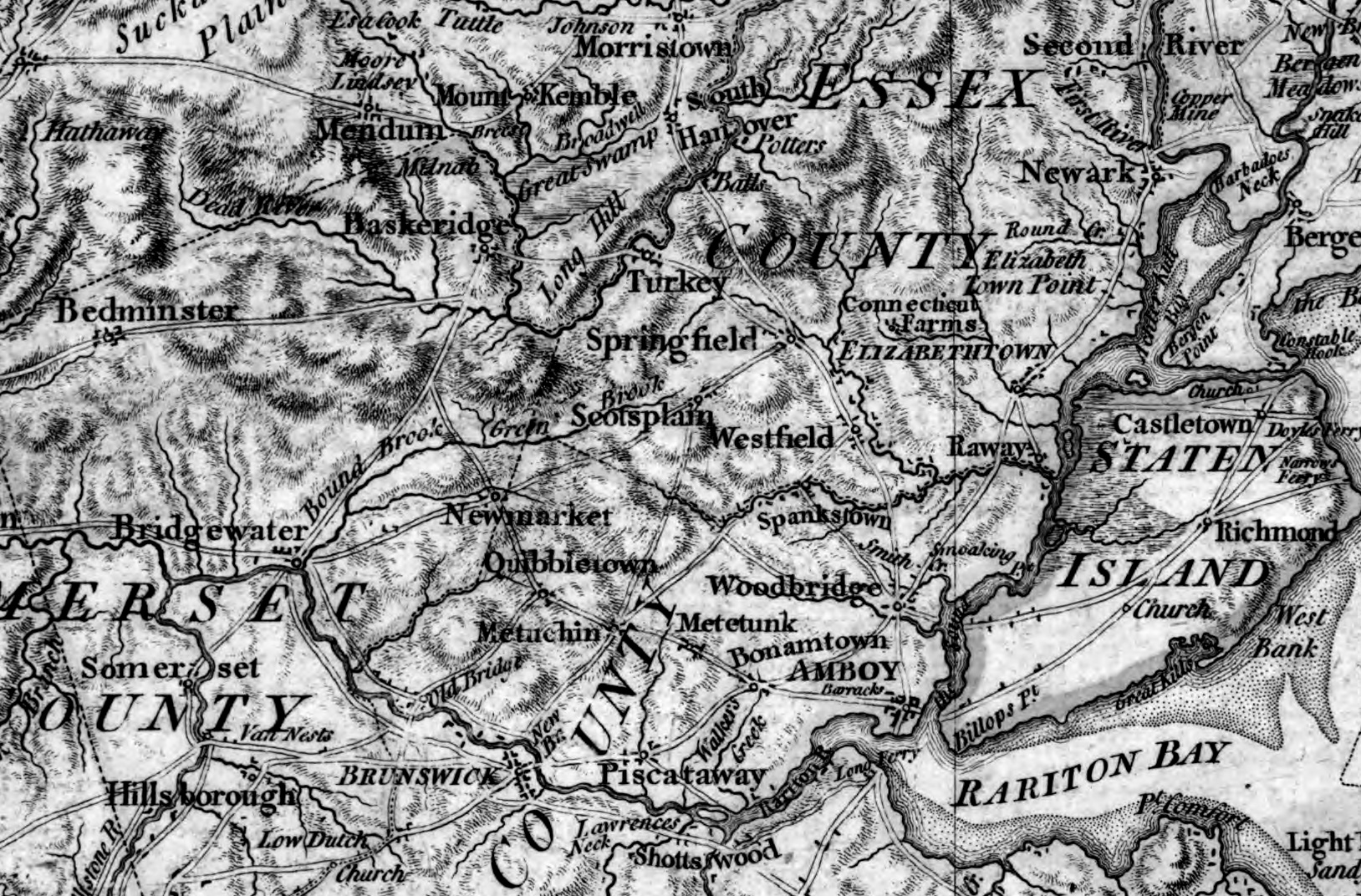
Detail of a 1777 map of the area. The battle took place at points between "Metuchin" and Westfield."

The column of General Cornwallis marched for Woodbridge, and that of Vaughan marched toward Bonhamton. As the two columns moved on roughly parallel paths through the Short Hills area, they came into contact with Stirling's guards, and a running skirmish began, with the Americans firing on the British from the underbrush as they fell back. The retreating Americans led both of the armies into the Ash Swamp and Scotch Plains areas, where Stirling prepared a defensive position. Severe cannon fire and strength of British numbers forced Stirling, as determined as he was to stand against them, to retreat even farther back toward Westfield, where the British, suffering under the extreme heat of the day, ended the pursuit, and Stirling fell back in good order toward the post at Middlebrook. A messenger had alerted Washington to Howe's proximity and prompted Washington into precipitately withdrawing to a more secure position farther in the hills. Later in the day, Howe arrived to inspect Washington's lines and adjudged them too strong to attack. Because Stirling's resistance may have provided Washington with enough time to manage his withdrawal to more secure ground, the battle is considered a strategic victory for the Americans. The British, after spending the night at Westfield, returned to their post at Perth Amboy and had completely evacuated New Jersey by June 30. In mid-July, Howe embarked much of his army on transports and sailed off toward Philadelphia, unknown to Washington.

A local tale arose in Westfield about an encounter between General Cornwallis and "Aunt Betty" Frazee, a local resident who had been baking bread for the Americans. When Cornwallis arrived, he requested a loaf of bread from her. When she offered it to him and said, "I give this not in love but in fear," Cornwallis graciously declined the offer and responded, "Not a man of my command shall touch a single loaf."

== Casualties ==
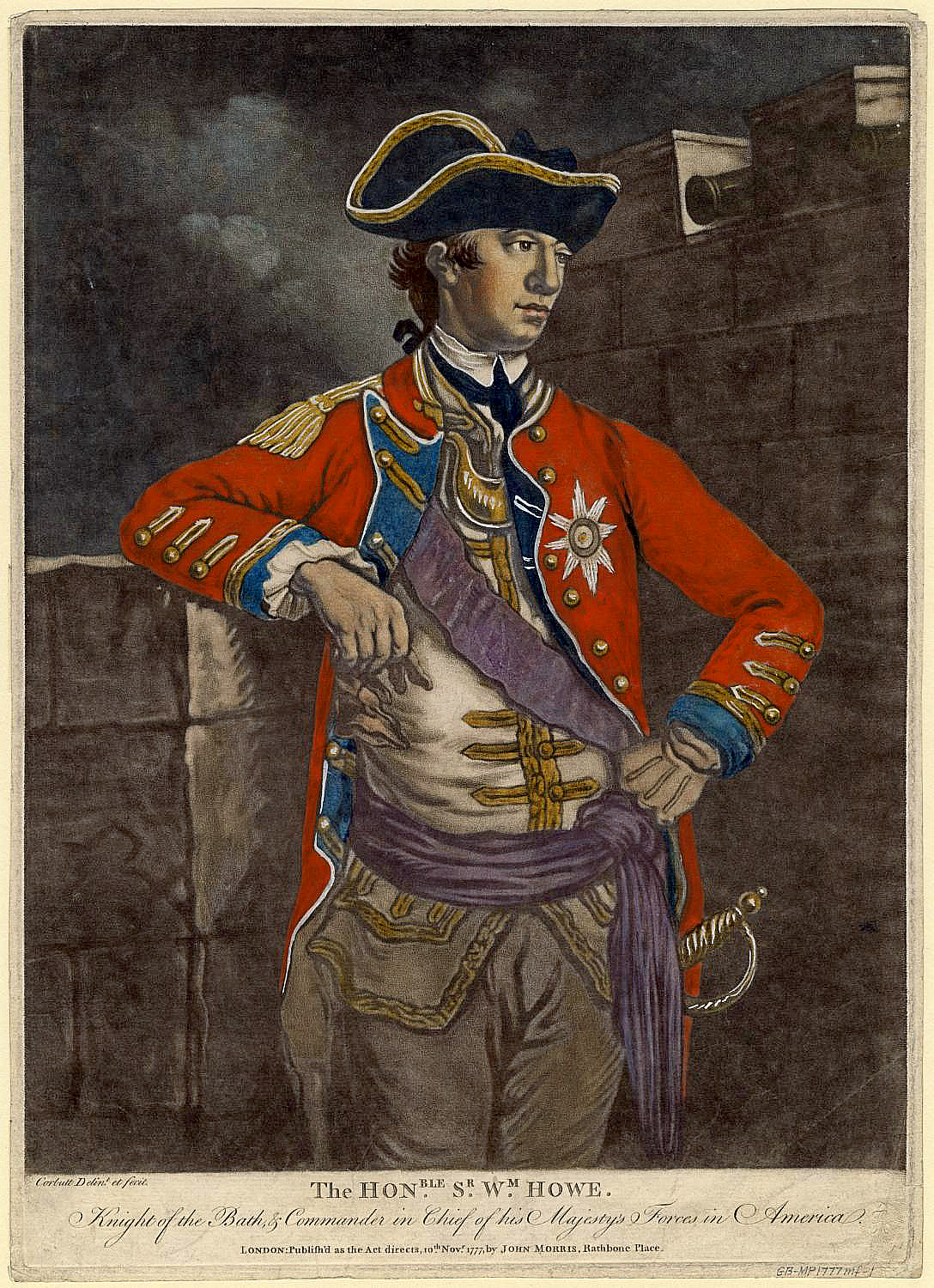
Lieutenant-general William Howe, commander of the British army

A British officer recorded the British and Hessian casualties as 5 killed and 30 wounded. The only officer casualty was Captain The Honourable John Finch of the Guards Light Infantry. He had been to the forefront of the attack and, at one point, called out to Lord Stirling, "Come here, you damned rebel, and I will do for you!" Stirling's response was to instruct four marksmen to concentrate their fire upon the captain. Finch soon received a wound, from which he died three days later.

The American casualties are not fully known. The British claimed that the Americans suffered 100 killed and wounded, and both sides acknowledged the American loss of three cannons, and the capture of 70 men. Ottendorf's Corps, who had formed Stirling's advance guard appear to have been hardest hit: out of 80 men, 32 were killed or captured. Colonel Israel Shreve, the commander of the 2nd New Jersey Regiment wrote on July 6, 1777 that Maxwell's Brigade "had 12 killed and about 20 wounded and as many taken prisoners...." He also noted in his journal, "We had between 20 & 30 Wounded... mostly slightly Except 3 or 4...." Two officers are recorded as having been lost in the 2nd New Jersey: Captain Ephraim Anderson was killed and Captain James Lawrie captured.

== Order of Battle ==
Order of battle, 26 June 1777.

=== Continental Army ===
Lord Stirling’s Infantry Division, Major-general William Alexander, Lord Stirling

- Conway’s Brigade, Brigadier-general Thomas Conway, 760 + men
  - 3rd Pennsylvania Regiment, Colonel Wood, 150 men
  - 6th Pennsylvania Regiment, Colonel Robert Magaw, unknown strength
  - 9th Pennsylvania Regiment, Colonel Morris, 193 men
  - 12th Pennsylvania Regiment, Colonel William Cooke, 231 men
  - Spencer’s Additional Regiment, Colonel Oliver Spencer, 186 men
- Maxwell’s Brigade, Brigadier-general William Maxwell, 1098 men
  - 1st New Jersey Regiment, Colonel Matthias Ogden, 184 men
  - 2nd New Jersey Regiment, Colonel Israel Shreve, 247 men
  - 3rd New Jersey Regiment, Colonel Elias Dayton, 300 men
  - 4th New Jersey Regiment, Colonel Ephraim Martin, 307 men
- Independent Corps, Colonel Charles Armand, unknown strength
  - Morgan’s Independent Rifle Corps, Colonel Daniel Morgan
  - 11th Virginia Regiment (elements), Colonel Daniel Morgan
  - 8th Virginia Regiment (company), Captain William Darke
  - 12th Virginia Regiment (elements), unknown commander
- Artillery
  - Lamb’s 2nd Continental Artillery (company), Captain Edward Archibald
  - Lamb’s 2nd Continental Artillery, Hugg's Company ((West Jersey Artillery Company), Lieutenant Eli Elmer
  - Crane’s 3rd Continental Artillery (company), Captain Benjamin Eustis
  - Pennsylvania Independent Artillery Company, Captain Gibbs Jones
  - Clark’s Artillery Company (East Jersey Artillery Company), Captain Thomas Clark
- Cavalry
  - 2nd Continental Light Dragoons, Colonel Elisha Sheldon

Elements of DeBorre’s Brigade of Sullivan’s Division present

=== Crown Forces ===
Commanding general, Lieutenant-general Sir William Howe

Lord Cornwallis’ Division, Lieutenant-general Charles Cornwallis (Right Column)

- Matthew’s Brigade, Brigadier-general Edward Mathew, 1992 men
  - 1st Guards Battalion, Lieutenant-colonel Henry Trelawny, 887 men (both Guards battalions)
  - 2nd Guards Battalion, Lieutenant-colonel James Ogilvie
  - Light Infantry Battalion (1st or 2nd), either Lieutenant-colonel Robert Abercromby or John Maitland, 565 men
  - Grenadier Battalion (1st or 2nd), either Lieutenant-colonel William Medows or Henry Monckton, 540 men
- 2nd Brigade, Major-general James Grant, 1189 men
  - 10th Foot, Major John Vatass, 312 men
  - 27th Foot, Lieutenant-colonel John Maxwell, 324 men
  - 40th Foot, Lieutenant-colonel Thomas Musgrave, 300 men
  - 52nd Foot, unknown, 253 men
- 5th Brigade, Brigadier-general Alexander Leslie
  - 71st Foot, Lieutenant-colonel Archibald Campbell, 992 men
- Hessian Brigade, Colonel Carl von Donop, 1600 men
  - Lengerke Grenadier Battalion, Lieutenant-colonel George Emanuel Lengerke, 440 men
  - Linsing Grenadier Battalion, Lieutenant-colonel Christian von Linsingen, 437 men
  - Minnigerode Grenadier Battalion, Lieutenant-colonel Friedrich Ludwig von Minnigerode, 430 men
  - Jaeger Rifle Corps, Lieutenant-colonel Ludwig Johann Adolph von Wurmb, 293 men

Vaughan's Division, Major-general John Vaughan (Left Column)

- 1st Brigade, Major-general John Vaughan, 1358
  - 4th Foot, Lieutenant-colonel James Ogilvie, 356 men
  - 23rd Foot, Lieutenant-colonel Benjamin Bernard, 353 men
  - 38th Foot, Lieutenant-colonel William Butler, 314 men
  - 49th Foot, Lieutenant-colonel Henry Calder, 335 men
- 3rd Brigade, Major-general Charles Grey, 1308 men
  - 15th Foot, Lieutenant-colonel John Bird, 367 men
  - 33rd Foot, Lieutenant-colonel James Webster, 368 men
  - 44th Foot, Lieutenant-colonel Henry Hope (?), 312 men
  - 55th Foot, Lieutenant-colonel William Meadows, 261 men
- 4th Brigade, Brigadier-general James Agnew, 1248 men
  - 17th Foot, Lieutenant-colonel Charles Mawhood, 233 men
  - 37th Foot, Lieutenant-colonel Robert Abercromby, 308 men
  - 46th Foot, Lieutenant-colonel Enoch Markham, 312 men
  - 64th Foot, unknown, 395
- Hessian Brigade, Major-general Johann Daniel Stirn, 1913+ men
  - Ewald’s Jaeger Company, Captain Johann Ewald, unknown strength
  - Anspach Jaegers, unknown, 218 men
  - Leib Infantry, Lieutenant-colonel Otto von Linsing, 598 men
  - Mirbach Fusilier, Lieutenant-colonel Justus Heinrich von Schieck, 553 men
  - Donop Infantry, Lieutenant-colonel Carl Philip Heymell, 544 men
  - Combined regiment (Woellwarth), Captain Wilhelm von Wilmowsky, unknown strength
- Cavalry
  - 16th Light Dragoons, Lieutenant-colonel William Harcourt, 353 men
  - 17th Light Dragoons, Lieutenant-colonel Samuel Birch, 384 men
  - Queen’s American Rangers, Major John Graves Simcoe, 398 men
- Artillery
  - 4th Battalion, Royal Artillery, Brigadier-general Samuel Cleaveland, 597 men
  - Hessian Artillery Corps, unknown, 655 men

== Legacy ==
An area of the battlefield, encompassing about 300 acres (120 ha) in Edison Township, was listed on the National Register of Historic Places in 2014. The area includes portions of the municipal land, as well as a part of the Plainfield Country Club. Edison's Oak Tree Pond Park is used as a re-enactment site of the battle.

== See also ==
- Elizabeth and Gershom Frazee House

== Sources ==
- Barber, John; Howe, Henry (1844). Historical Collections of the State of New Jersey. New York: S. Tuttle. p. 315. OCLC 10631653.
- Cecere, Michael (2006). They Are Indeed a Very Useful Corps: American Riflemen in the Revolutionary War. Westminster, MD: Heritage Books. ISBN 978-0-7884-4141-7. OCLC 74060495.
- Duncan, Francis (1872). History of the Royal Regiment of Artillery, Volume 1. London: J. Murray. OCLC 3636726.
- Ewald, Johann (1979). Tustin, Joseph P. (ed.). Diary of the American War: a Hessian Journal. New Haven, CT: Yale University Press. ISBN 0-300-02153-4.
- Fortescue, Sir John William (1902). A History of the British Army, Volume 3. London and New York: Macmillan. OCLC 11627662.
- Lundin, Leonard (1972) [1940]. Cockpit of the Revolution: the War for Independence in New Jersey. Octagon Books. ISBN 0-374-95143-8.
- Martin, David G (1993). The Philadelphia Campaign: June 1777–July 1778. Conshohocken, PA: Combined Books. ISBN 0-938289-19-5. 2003 Da Capo reprint, ISBN 0-306-81258-4.
- McGuire, Thomas J (2006). The Philadelphia Campaign, Vol. I: Brandywine and the Fall of Philadelphia. Mechanicsburg, PA: Stackpole Books. ISBN 978-0-8117-0178-5.
- Ricord, F. W (2007). History of Union County, New Jersey. Bowie, MD: Heritage Books. ISBN 978-0-7884-1792-4. OCLC 182527582.
- Ward, Christopher (1952). The War of the Revolution. New York: MacMillan. OCLC 214962727.
- Ward, Harry (1997). General William Maxwell and the New Jersey Continentals. Westport, CT: Greenwood Press. ISBN 978-0-313-30432-3. OCLC 246781793.
