= New Jersey Line =

Formation within the Continental Army during the American Revolutionary War

The New Jersey Line was a formation within the Continental Army in the American War of Independence. A "New Jersey Line" was the quota of numbered infantry regiments that the Congress of the Confederacy assigned to New Jersey at various times.

== New Jersey Line, 1776 ==
The first two regiments were authorized by Congress on October 9, 1775. The Third New Jersey Regiment was authorized on January 1, 1776. Not all Continental infantry regiments raised in a state were part of a state quota, however. On December 27, 1776, the Continental Congress gave Washington temporary control over certain military decisions that the Congress ordinarily regarded as its own prerogative. These "dictatorial powers" included the authority to raise sixteen additional Continental infantry regiments at large.

== New Jersey Line, 1777 ==
Forman's Additional Continental Regiment, under the command of Colonel David Forman, was authorized on September 16, 1776. Another unit, known formally as Spencer's Additional Continental Regiment, under the command of Colonel Oliver Spencer, was sometimes referred to as the Fifth New Jersey Regiment. Neither unit was ever allotted to the New Jersey Line although they contained a large proportion of troops from New Jersey.

Early in 1777, Washington offered command of one of these additional regiments to David Forman of New Jersey, who accepted. Forman had formerly been a New Jersey militia leader.

Washington also offered command of an additional regiment to Oliver Spencer of New Jersey, who accepted. In 1776, Spencer had also served in the New Jersey militia. Spencer's Regiment was unofficially designated the "5th New Jersey Regiment". One company was recruited in Pennsylvania, however.

Patton's Additional Continental Regiment was also partially drawn from New Jersey. Still other Continental infantry regiments and smaller units, also unrelated to a state quota, were raised as needed for special or temporary service.

Under the command of Brigadier General William Maxwell, it was also known as "Maxwell's brigade" or simply the "Jersey Line". As with preceding military units from New Jersey, the regiments that comprised the New Jersey Line were often referred to as the "Jersey Blues".

List of regiments of the New Jersey Line:

- 1st New Jersey Regiment, Colonel Matthias Ogden
- 2nd New Jersey Regiment, Colonel Israel Shreve
- 3rd New Jersey Regiment, Colonel Elias Dayton
- 4th New Jersey Regiment, Colonel Ephraim Martin
- Spencer's Additional Continental Regiment, Colonel Oliver Spencer
- Forman's Additional Continental Regiment, Colonel David Forman

== See also ==
- Fort Billingsport
- List of United States militia units in the American Revolutionary War
