= History of LGBTQ rights under U.S. presidents =

Wikimedia Chronicle Article

Presidents throughout the history of the United States have taken varying stances and actions on LGBTQ rights.

== George Washington ==
=== Commander-in-Chief of the Continental Army ===
To train the new American Army in the latest military drills and tactics, General George Washington brought in Friedrich Wilhelm von Steuben (1730–94), who had been an officer on the German general staff. Von Steuben escaped Germany, where he was threatened with prosecution for homosexuality. He joined Washington's army at Valley Forge in February 1778 accompanied by two young aides. Steuben became an American general, and a senior advisor to Washington. Despite rumors about sexual behavior at his parties, there never was an investigation of Steuben, and he received a congressional pension after the war.

The first evidence of discrimination to homosexuals serving in the United States military dates from March 11, 1778, when Lieutenant Frederick Gotthold Enslin was brought to trial before a court-martial. According to General Washington's report: "...Lieutt. Enslin of Colo. Malcolm's Regiment tried for attempting to commit sodomy ..." Washington's secretary described the results of the trial: "His Excellency the commander in chief approves the sentence and with Abhorrence & Detestation of such Infamous Crimes orders Lieut. Enslin to be drummed out of Camp tomorrow morning...."

== John Adams ==
In 1801, Congress enacted the District of Columbia Organic Act of 1801 that continued all criminal laws of Maryland and Virginia in the now formally structured District, with those of Maryland applying to that portion of the District ceded from Maryland, and those of Virginia applying to that portion ceded from Virginia. At the time, Maryland had a sodomy law applicable only to free males with a punishment of "labour for any time, in their discretion, not exceeding seven years for the same crime, on the public roads of the said county, or in making, repairing or cleaning the streets or bason [sic] of Baltimore-town;" it imposed the death penalty for slaves committing sodomy. Similarly, Virginia had a penalty of 1–10 years for free persons committing sodomy, but imposed the death penalty for slaves committing sodomy. The law went into effect on February 27, 1801.

== Thomas Jefferson ==
=== Governor of Virginia ===
In 1779, Thomas Jefferson wrote a law in Virginia which contained a maximum punishment of castration for men who engaged in sodomy. However, what was intended by Jefferson as a liberalization of the sodomy laws in Virginia at that time was rejected by the Virginia Legislature, which continued to prescribe death as the maximum penalty for the crime of sodomy in that state.

== Andrew Jackson ==
In 1831, Congress established penalties in the District of Columbia for a number of crimes, but not for sodomy. It specified that "every other felony, misdemeanor, or offence not provided for by this act, may and shall be punished as heretofore[.]" At the time, Maryland and Virginia had a penalty of 1–10 years for committing sodomy. It went into effect on March 2, 1831.

== William Henry Harrison ==
=== Governor of the Indiana Territory ===
In 1807, William Henry Harrison signed into law a comprehensive criminal code that included the first sodomy law for the Indiana Territory that eliminated the gender-specifics, reduced the penalty for a maximum of 1 to 5 years in prison, a fine of $100 to $500, up to 500 lashes on the back, and a permanent loss of civil rights.

== Benjamin Harrison ==
In 1892, Congress passed a law for the District of Columbia that states that "for the preservation of the public peace and the protection of property within the District of Columbia." Labeled in the law as vagrants were "all public prostitutes, and all such persons who lead a notoriously lewd or lascivious course of life[.]" All offenders had to post bond of up to $200 for good behavior for a period of six months. The law went into effect on July 29, 1892.

== William McKinley ==
In 1898, Congress amended the provision by removing the word "notoriously" when concerning a lewd or lascivious course of life, thereby allowing prosecution of persons without the condition of notoriety. The bond for good behavior was raised to $500, and the law was made gender-neutral. The law went into effect on July 8, 1898.

In 1901, Congress adopted a new code for the District of Columbia that expressly recognized common-law crimes, with a penalty for them of up to five years and/or a $1,000 fine. The law went into effect on March 3, 1901.

== Woodrow Wilson ==
On December 14, 1916, President Woodrow Wilson vetoed the Immigration Act of 1917, which would have excluded individuals from entering the United States who were found "mentally defective" or who had a "constitutional psychopathic inferiority." A similar Public Health Service definition of homosexuals was used simultaneously by the Immigration and Naturalization Service (INS) to reinforce the language of the Immigration Act of 1917 and effectively ban all homosexual immigrants who disclosed their sexual minority status. On February 5, 1917, the Congress overrode Wilson's veto, implementing the Immigration Act of 1917 into law.

On March 1, 1917, the Articles of War of 1916 are implemented. This included a revision of the Articles of War of 1806, the new regulations detail statutes governing U.S. military discipline and justice. Under the category Miscellaneous Crimes and Offences, Article 93 states that any person subject to military law who commits "assault with intent to commit sodomy" shall be punished as a court-martial may direct.

On June 4, 1920, Congress modified Article 93 of the Articles of War of 1916. It was changed to make the act of sodomy itself a crime, separate from the offense of assault with intent to commit sodomy. It went into effect on February 4, 1921.

== Franklin Roosevelt ==
=== Assistant Secretary of the Navy ===
In 1919, Democratic Assistant Secretary of the Navy Franklin D. Roosevelt requested an investigation into "vice and depravity" in the sea services after a sting operation in which undercover operatives attempt to seduce sailors suspected of being homosexual had already begun at the Naval base in Newport, Rhode Island. At least 17 sailors were jailed and court-martialed before public outcry prompted a Republican-led Senate committee to condemn the methods of the operation. Roosevelt denied he had any knowledge that entrapment had been used or that he would have approved of it.

=== Presidency ===
In 1935, Congress passed a law for the District of Columbia that made it a crime for "any person to invite, entice, persuade, or to address for the purpose of inviting, enticing, or persuading any person or persons...to accompany, to go with, to follow him or her to his or her residence, or to any other house or building, inclosure, or other place, for the purpose of prostitution, or any other immoral or lewd purpose." It imposed a fine of up to $100, up to 90 days in jail, and courts were permitted to "impose conditions" on anyone convicted under this law, including "medical and mental examination, diagnosis and treatment by proper public health and welfare authorities, and such other terms and conditions as the court may deem best for the protection of the community and the punishment, control, and rehabilitation of the defendant." The law went into effect on August 14, 1935.

In 1941, Congress enacted a new solicitation law for the District of Columbia that labeled a "vagrant" any person who "engages in or commits acts of fornication or perversion for hire." The law went into effect on December 17, 1941.

== Harry Truman ==
In 1948, Congress enacted the first sodomy law in the District of Columbia, which established a penalty of up to 10 years in prison or a fine of up to $1,000 for sodomy. Also included with this sodomy law was a psychopathic offender law and a law "to provide for the treatment of sexual psychopaths in the District of Columbia, and for other purposes." The law went into effect on June 9, 1948.

On May 5, 1950, the Uniform Code of Military Justice was passed by Congress and was signed into law by President Harry S. Truman, and became effective on May 31, 1951. Article 125 forbids sodomy among all military personnel, defining it as "any person subject to this chapter who engages in unnatural carnal copulation with another person of the same or opposite sex or with an animal is guilty of sodomy. Penetration, however slight, is sufficient to complete the offence."

On June 25, 1952, the Immigration and Nationality Act of 1952 was vetoed by President Truman because he regarded the bill as "un-American" and discriminatory. The bill prohibits "aliens afflicted with a psychopathic personality, epilepsy, or a mental defect" from entry into the United States. Congress would later override his veto and implemented the act into law.

== Dwight D. Eisenhower ==
On April 27, 1953, President Dwight D. Eisenhower signed Executive Order 10450 which prohibits Federal employees from being members of a group or organization considered subversive. The order lists "sexual perversion" as a security risk constituting grounds for termination or denial of employment. The order went into effect on May 27, 1953.

Without explicitly referring to homosexuality, the executive order responded to several years of charges that the presence of homosexual employees in the State Department posed blackmail risks. Attorney General Herbert Brownell Jr. explained that the new order was designed to encompass both loyalty and security risks and he differentiated between the two: "Employees could be a security risk and still not be disloyal or have any traitorous thoughts, but it may be that their personal habits are such that they might be subject to blackmail by people who seek to destroy the safety of our country."

The press recognized the revolutionary nature of the new executive order. The Washington Post said that it established not a loyalty test but a "suitability test." Some in government referred to their new "integrity-security" program. Some of those the press expected to be excluded from federal employment included "a person who drinks too much," "an incorrigible gossip," "homosexuals," and "neurotics."

In 1953, Congress changed the solicitation law in the District of Columbia so that the jail term of up to 90 days was retained, but the maximum fine was raised to $250, and the reference to the power of judges to "impose conditions" on the defendant was removed. The law went into effect on June 29, 1953.

== John F. Kennedy ==
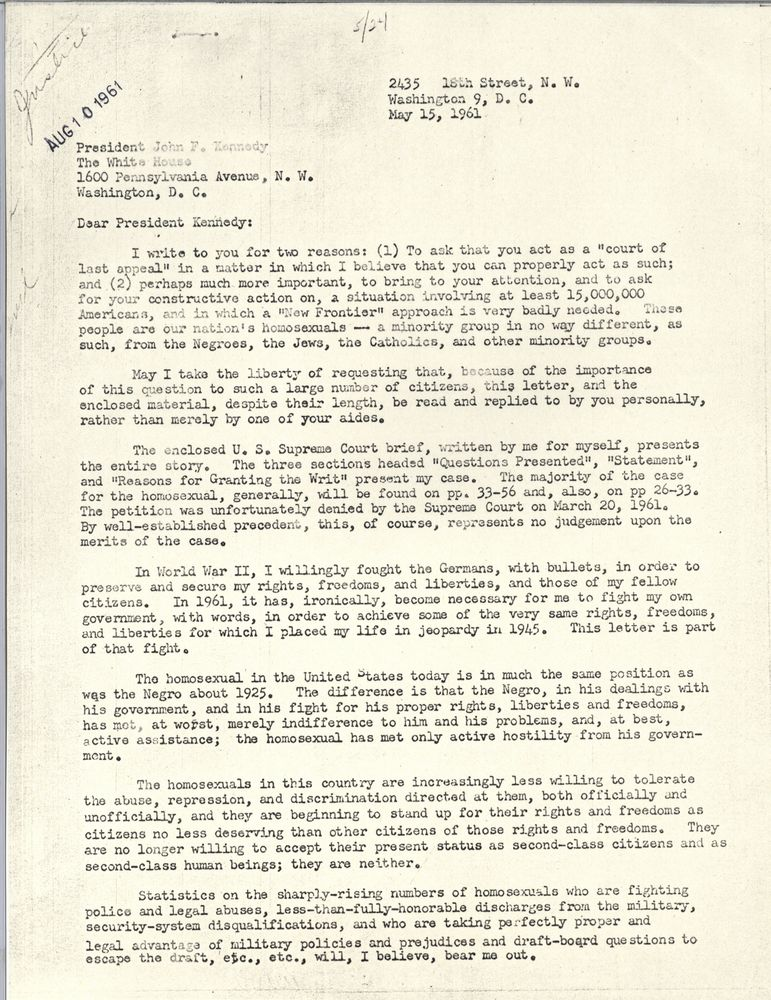
Letter from Kameny to President Kennedy, JFK Library

In late 1961, Frank Kameny co-founded the Washington D.C. branch of the national gay rights organization, Mattachine Society. In the year following the group's founding, Kameny led an initiative to declare the existence of the Mattachine Society of Washington publicly. The group sent letters to every government branch, including the entirety of Congress. Kameny also wrote to President John F. Kennedy asking him to change the rules on homosexuals being purged from the government. The content of the letters included harsh criticism of the government's treatment of homosexuals and asserted that there were over three hundred members of the group. The letter was signed by the president of the Mattachine Society of Washington, Franklin E. Kameny.

The Mattachine Society of Washington discussed the prospect of public protest in 1963. The FBI and J. Edgar Hoover had made advancements to ban the Washington branch and had been threatened with the prospect of a march on behalf of the organization. Although supportive of the idea, Kameny restrained from taking part in a march due to the threat of damaging his public image.

In 1963, Kameny and Mattachine launched a campaign to overturn D.C. sodomy laws.

== Lyndon B. Johnson ==
=== Senator of Texas ===
On February 2, 1950, Senator Lyndon B. Johnson voted for Uniform Code of Military Justice.

=== Presidency ===
On October 19, 1964, Walter Jenkins, a longtime top aide to President Johnson, had been arrested by District of Columbia Police in a YMCA restroom. He and another man were booked on a disorderly conduct charge.

After becoming a controversy prior to the 1964 presidential election, the American Mental Health Foundation wrote a letter to President Johnson protesting the "hysteria" surrounding the case:

The private life and inclinations of a citizen, Government employee or not, does not necessarily have any bearing on his capacities, usefulness, and sense of responsibility in his occupation. The fact that an individual is homosexual, as has been strongly implied in the case of Mr. Jenkins, does not per se make him more unstable and more a security risk than any heterosexual person.

After reelection during his second term on October 3, 1965, Johnson signed the Immigration and Nationality Act of 1965, which added "sexual deviation" as a medical ground for denying prospective immigrants entry into the United States. The bill went into effect on June 30, 1968.

== Richard Nixon ==
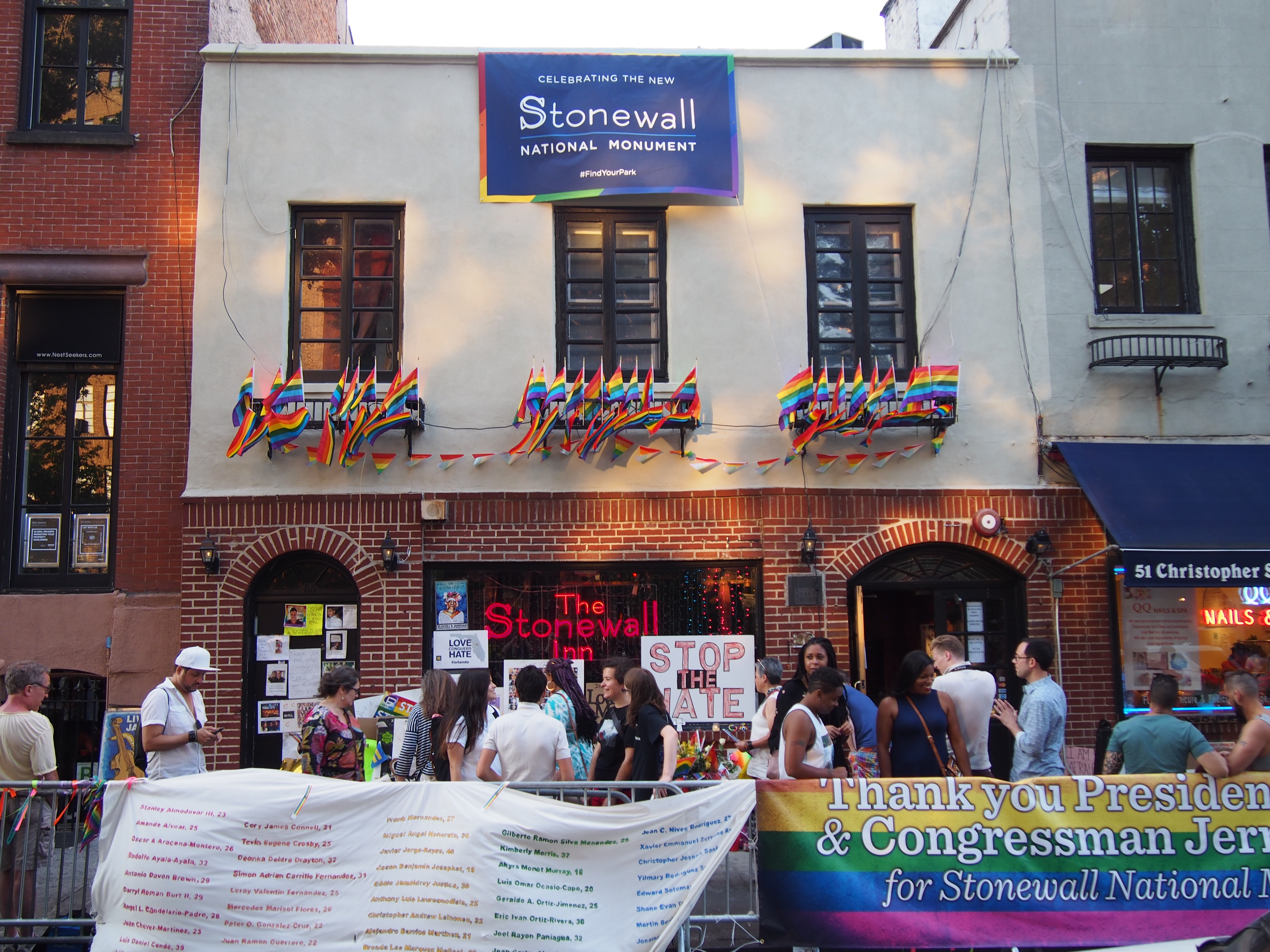
The Stonewall Inn in the gay village of Greenwich Village, Manhattan, adorned with rainbow flags during a pride event. The Inn was the site of the eponymous Stonewall riots in June 1969: a series of events which precipitated the modern LGBTQ rights movement. Stonewall has since become an icon of LGBTQ culture and gay pride in the United States.

=== Presidency ===
In August 1970, Richard Nixon, on the issue of same-sex marriage, said "I can't go that far; that's the year 2000! Negroes and whites, okay. But that's too far!"

In 1972, San Francisco's Gay Activists Alliance disbanded and formed the Gay Voters League, a group that campaigned for the reelection of President Richard Nixon. In October 1972, a representative of the Committee to Re-elect the President addressed gay voters on behalf of Nixon's campaign in San Francisco. The event was organized by the Gay Voters League of San Francisco.

== Gerald Ford ==
=== House Minority Leader ===
On August 25, 1965, Rep. Gerald Ford voted for the Immigration and Nationality Act of 1965.

=== Presidency ===
On March 5, 1976, when asked about the issue of gay rights, with respect to hiring, employment, and housing, Gerald Ford said "I recognize that this is a very new and serious problem in our society. I have always tried to be an understanding person as far as people are concerned who are different than myself. That doesn't mean that I agree with or would concur in what is done by them or their position in society. I think this is a problem we have to face up to, and I can't give you a pat answer tonight. I just would be dishonest to say that there is a pat answer under these very difficult circumstances".

In 1976, during that year's presidential campaign, President Gerald Ford was "zapped" by activists in Ann Arbor, Michigan over federal immigration rules. The protests forced President Ford to admit that he was not aware that homosexuality was used as a basis for exclusion in immigration rulings.

=== Post-presidency ===
Gerald Ford, as former president, formally opposed the Briggs Initiative in 1977, which sought to ban homosexuals from teaching in public school. In October 2001, he broke with conservative members of the Republican Party by stating that gay and lesbian couples "ought to be treated equally. Period." He became the highest ranking Republican to embrace full equality for gays and lesbians, stating his belief that there should be a federal amendment outlawing anti-gay job discrimination and expressing his hope that the Republican Party would reach out to gay and lesbian voters. He also was a member of the Republican Unity Coalition, which The New York Times described as "a group of prominent Republicans, including former President Gerald R. Ford, dedicated to making sexual orientation a non-issue in the Republican Party".

== Jimmy Carter ==
=== Post-governorship of Georgia ===
In February 1976, Carter said he opposed discrimination on the basis of sexual orientation, but in June 1976 he withdrew his support of a gay rights plank in the Democratic Party platform.

=== Presidency ===
In 1977, under the guidance of Jimmy Carter, a policy was removed which barred employment of gays in the foreign service and Internal Revenue Service. That same year, fourteen gay and lesbian activists were invited to the White House for the first official visit ever. Jimmy Carter publicly opposed the Briggs Initiative. However, in March 1980, Carter issued a formal statement indicating he would not issue an executive order banning anti-gay discrimination in the U.S. federal government and that he would not support including a gay rights plank in the Democratic Party platform. In September 1980, the United States Department of Justice announced that immigration officials would no longer be allowed to ask whether an individual entering the United States was gay and therefore ineligible for admission. An individual would only be denied admission into the United States if the traveler self-identified as gay to the immigration official.

=== Post-presidency ===
In 2004, Carter came out for civil unions and stated that he "opposes all forms of discrimination on the basis of sexual orientation and believes there should be equal protection under the law for people who differ in sexual orientation". In 2007, he called for ending the ban on gays in the military. In March 2012, Jimmy Carter came out in favor of same sex marriage.

== Ronald Reagan ==
=== Post-governorship of California ===
The first chapter of what would become the national Log Cabin Republicans (LCR) formed in 1978 to fight California's Briggs Initiative, a ballot initiative that would have banned homosexuals from teaching in public schools. The chapter worked diligently and successfully convinced Governor Reagan to publicly oppose the measure. Reagan penned an op-ed against the Briggs Initiative in which he wrote, "Whatever else it is, homosexuality is not a contagious disease like the measles. Prevailing scientific opinion is that an individual's sexuality is determined at a very early age and that a child's teachers do not really influence this."

=== Presidency ===
On the 1980 campaign trail, he spoke of the gay civil rights movement:

My criticism is that [the gay movement] isn't just asking for civil rights; it's asking for recognition and acceptance of an alternative lifestyle which I do not believe society can condone, nor can I.

No civil rights legislation for LGBTQ individuals passed during Reagan's tenure. Additionally, Reagan has been criticized for ignoring (by failing to adequately address or fund) the growing AIDS epidemic, even as it took thousands of lives in the 1980s. Reagan's surgeon general from 1982 to 1989, Dr. C. Everett Koop, claims that his attempts to address the issue were shut out by the Reagan administration. According to Koop, the prevailing view of the Reagan administration was that "transmission of AIDS was understood to be primarily in the homosexual population and in those who abused intravenous drugs" and therefore that people dying from AIDS were "only getting what they justly deserve."

On August 18, 1984, President Reagan issued a statement on the issue of same-sex marriage that read:

Society has always regarded marital love as a sacred expression of the bond between a man and a woman. It is the means by which families are created and society itself is extended into the future. In the Judeo-Christian tradition it is the means by which husband and wife participate with God in the creation of a new human life. It is for these reasons, among others, that our society has always sought to protect this unique relationship. In part the erosion of these values has given way to a celebration of forms of expression most reject. We will resist the efforts of some to obtain government endorsement of homosexuality.

Reagan made the comment in response to a questionnaire from the conservative publishers of the Presidential Biblical Scoreboard, a magazine-type compilation of past statements and voting records of national candidates.

== George H. W. Bush ==
=== Vice presidency ===
In 1988, the Republican Party's nominee, Vice President George H. W. Bush, endorsed a plan to protect persons with AIDS from discrimination.

=== Presidency ===
As President, George H. W. Bush signed legislation that extended gay rights. On April 23, 1990, George H. W. Bush signed the Hate Crime Statistics Act, which requires the Attorney General to collect data on crimes committed because of the victim's race, religion, disability, sexual orientation, or ethnicity. It was the first federal statute to "recognize and name gay, lesbian and bisexual people." On July 26, 1990, George H. W. Bush signed the Americans with Disabilities Act of 1990. On November 29, 1990, Bush signed the Immigration Act of 1990, which withdrew the phrase "sexual deviation" from the Immigration and Nationality Act (INA) so that it could no longer be used as a basis for barring entry of immigration to the U.S. for homosexuals.

In a television interview, Bush said if he found out his grandchild was gay, he would "love his child", but tell him homosexuality was not normal and discourage him from working for gay rights. In February 1992, the chairman of the Bush-Quayle campaign met with the National Gay and Lesbian Task Force. In May 1992, he appointed Anne-Imelda Radice to serve as the Acting Chairman of the National Endowment for the Arts. Losing ground in the 1992 Republican president primary to President Bush's far-right challenger, Pat Buchanan, the Bush campaign turned to the right, and President Bush publicly denounced same-sex marriage.

The 1992 Log Cabin Republican convention was held in Spring, Texas, a Houston exurb. The main issue discussed was whether or not LCR would endorse the re-election of President George H. W. Bush. The group voted to deny that endorsement because Bush did not denounce anti-gay rhetoric at the 1992 Republican National Convention. Many in the gay community believed President Bush had not done enough on the issue of AIDS. Urvashi Vaid argues that Bush's anti-gay rhetoric "motivated conservative gay Democrats and loyal gay Republicans, who had helped defeat Dukakis in 1988, to throw their support behind Clinton."

In 1992, the Council of the District of Columbia passed the "Health Benefits Expansion Act", which was signed into law by the Mayor of Washington, D.C. The bill, which established domestic partnerships in the District of Columbia, became law on June 11, 1992. Every year from 1992 to 2000, the Republican leadership of the U.S. Congress added a rider to the District of Columbia appropriations bill that prohibited the use of federal or local funds to implement the Health Care Benefits Expansion Act. On October 5, 1992, Bush signed the H.R. 6056 into law, which included the Republican rider to the appropriations bill.

=== Post-presidency ===
In 2013, former President George H. W. Bush served as a witness at a same-sex wedding of Bonnie Clement and Helen Thorgalsen, who own a general store together in Maine. In 2015, The Boston Globe reported that Bush "offered to perform the ceremony but had a scheduling conflict."

== Bill Clinton ==
=== Governorship of Arkansas ===
In 1992, Governor Bill Clinton, as a candidate for president, issued a public statement of support for repeal of Arkansas's sodomy law. Also in 1992, the Human Rights Campaign, America's largest LGBTQ rights organization, issued its first presidential endorsement in 1992 to Bill Clinton.

=== Presidency ===
Bill Clinton's legacy on gay rights is a matter of controversy. LGBTQ rights activist Richard Socarides credits Clinton as the first president to publicly champion gay rights, but Clinton's signing of DOMA and DADT have led critics like Andrew Sullivan to argue Clinton was a detriment to rather than an ally for the LGBTQ rights movement, though DOMA passed Congress with veto-proof majorities in the House and Senate. In December 1993, Clinton implemented a Department of Defense directive known as "Don't Ask, Don't Tell", which allowed gay men and women to serve in the armed services provided they kept their sexuality a secret, and forbade the military from inquiring about an individual's sexual orientation. The policy was developed as a compromise after Clinton's proposal to allow gays to serve openly in the military met with staunch opposition from prominent congressional Republicans and Democrats, including Senators John McCain (R-AZ) and Sam Nunn (D-GA). According to David Mixner, Clinton's support for the compromise led to a heated dispute with Vice President Al Gore, who felt that "the President should lift the ban ... even though [his executive order] was sure to be overridden by the Congress".

Some gay-rights advocates criticized Clinton for not going far enough and accused him of making his campaign promise to get votes and contributions. Their position was that Clinton should have integrated the military by executive order, noting that President Harry Truman used executive order to racially desegregate the armed forces. Clinton's defenders argue that an executive order might have prompted the Senate to write the exclusion of gays into law, potentially making it harder to integrate the military in the future. Later in his presidency, in 1999, Clinton criticized the way the policy was implemented, saying he did not think any serious person could say it was not "out of whack". On September 21, 1996, Clinton signed into law the Defense of Marriage Act (DOMA), which defines marriage for federal purposes as the legal union of one man and one woman, allowing individual states to refuse to recognize gay marriages performed in other states. Paul Yandura, speaking for the White House gay and lesbian liaison office, said that Clinton's signing of DOMA "was a political decision that they made at the time of a re-election." In defense of his actions, Clinton has said that DOMA was an attempt to "head off an attempt to send a constitutional amendment banning gay marriage to the states", a possibility he described as highly likely in the context of a "very reactionary Congress."

Administration spokesman Richard Socarides said, "... the alternatives we knew were going to be far worse, and it was time to move on and get the president re-elected." Others were more critical. The veteran gay rights and gay marriage activist Evan Wolfson has called these claims "historic revisionism". In a July 2, 2011, editorial The New York Times opined, "The Defense of Marriage Act was enacted in 1996 as an election-year wedge issue, signed by President Bill Clinton in one of his worst policy moments." Despite DOMA, Clinton, who was the first president to select openly gay persons for administration positions, is generally credited as the first president to publicly champion gay rights. During his presidency, Clinton controversially issued two substantial executive orders on behalf of gay rights, the first was Executive Order 12968 in 1995 that lifted the ban on security clearances for LGBTQ federal employees and the second was Executive Order 13087 in 1998 that outlawed discrimination based on sexual orientation in the federal civilian workforce. In November 1997, Clinton gave an address to a Human Rights Campaign meeting, and thus becoming the first U.S. president to address a meeting for a gay and lesbian organization.

Under President Clinton's leadership, federal funding for HIV/AIDS research, prevention and treatment more than doubled. And Clinton also pushed for passing hate crimes laws for gays and for the private sector Employment Non-Discrimination Act, which, buoyed by his lobbying, failed to pass the Senate by a single vote in 1996. Advocacy for these issues, paired with the politically unpopular nature of the gay rights movement at the time, led to enthusiastic support for Clinton's reelection in 1996 by the Human Rights Campaign. Clinton was the first president to select openly gay persons for administration positions, appointing over 150 LGBTQ appointees. The first openly gay U.S. ambassador, James Hormel, received a recess appointment from the president after the Senate failed to confirm the nomination. On June 11, 1999, Clinton declared June to be Gay and Lesbian Pride Month, making him the first Democratic president to do so.

=== Post-presidency ===
In 2008, Clinton publicly opposed the passage of California's Proposition 8 and recorded robocalls urging Californians to vote against it. In July 2009, he came out in favor of same-sex marriage. On March 7, 2013, Clinton called for the overturn of the Defense of Marriage Act by the U.S. Supreme Court.

== George W. Bush ==
In his 1994 campaign to become the governor of Texas, Bush pledged to veto any effort to repeal Texas's sodomy law, calling it "a symbolic gesture of traditional values."

=== Governor of Texas ===
In 1997, Governor Bush signed into law a bill adding "A license may not be issued for the marriage of persons of the same sex" into the Texas Family Code. In a 1998 Texas Gubernatorial election political awareness test, he answered no to the questions of whether Texas government should include sexual orientation in Texas' anti-discrimination laws and whether he supports Texas recognizing same-sex marriage.

In 1999, the Byrd Jr. Hate Crimes Act, which would have increased punishment for criminals motivated by hatred of a victim's gender, religion, ethnic background or sexual orientation, was killed in committee by Texas Senate Republicans. Governor Bush was criticized for letting the hate crimes bill die in a Texas Senate committee. Bush spokesman Sullivan said the governor never took a position on the bill. According to Louvon Harris, sister of James Byrd, said that Bush's opposition to the bill reportedly revolved around the fact that it would cover gays and lesbians.

The governor's office "contacted the family and asked if we would consider taking sexual orientation out of the bill, and our answer was no, because the bill is for everybody. Everybody should be protected by the law." said Harris. In a 2000 presidential debate, Al Gore would attack Bush for allowing the bill to die in committee, with Bush responding Texas already had a hate crimes statute, and nothing more was needed. George W. Bush also stated his opposition to a New Jersey Supreme Court ruling that said the Boy Scouts of America must accept gays in their organization. "I believe the Boy Scouts is a private organization and they should be able to set the standards that they choose to set," Bush said. Bush also expressed his support for bans on gay foster parenting and adoption, urging agencies to place children in "traditional homes—man and wife."

During the 2000 campaign he did not endorse a single piece of gay rights legislation. In a 2000 Republican presidential debate, George W. Bush said he opposes same-sex marriage, but supports states' rights when it came to the issue of same-sex marriage. During the campaign he had refused to comment on Vermont's civil unions law. On April 13, 2000, Governor Bush became first presumptive GOP presidential nominee ever to meet publicly with gay Republicans in Austin, Texas.

On August 4, 2000, Bush received the endorsement of the Log Cabin Republicans, the GOP's largest gay group, for president. He also received the endorsement of the newly formed Republican Unity Coalition. In a 2000 presidential debate with Al Gore, Bush stated he supported the Defense of Marriage Act and the "Don't ask, don't tell" policy. However, he stated that he opposed sodomy laws, a reversal of his position as governor of Texas.

=== Presidency ===
George W. Bush, despite being opposed to LGBTQ rights when Governor of Texas, was relatively moderate in regards to LGBTQ rights as president, though opposed gay marriage and would later voice his support for civil unions. In his eight years of office, Bush's views on gay rights were often difficult to ascertain, but many experts feel that the Bush White House wanted to avoid bad publicity without alienating evangelical conservative Christian voters. Thus, he did not repeal President Clinton's Executive Order banning discrimination on the basis of sexual orientation in the federal civilian government, but Bush's critics felt as if he failed to enforce the executive order. He retained Clinton's Office of National AIDS Policy and was the first Republican president to appoint an openly gay man to serve in his administration, Scott Evertz as director of the Office of National AIDS Policy. Bush also became the second president, after Clinton, to select openly gay appointees to his administration. Bush's nominee as ambassador to Romania, Michael E. Guest, became the second openly gay man U.S. Ambassador and the first to be confirmed by the Senate. He did not repeal any of the spousal benefits that Clinton had introduced for same-sex federal employees. He did not attempt to repeal don't ask, don't tell, nor make an effort to change it.

In April 2002, White House officials held an unannounced briefing in April for the Log Cabin Republicans. On June 27, 2002, President Bush signed a bill allowing death benefits to be paid to domestic partners of firefighters and police officers who die in the line of duty, permanently extending a federal death benefit to same-sex couples for the first time. In 2003, the U.S. Supreme Court ruled in Lawrence v. Texas that sodomy laws against consenting adults was unconstitutional. President Bush's press secretary Ari Fleischer refused to comment on the decision, noting only that the administration had not filed a brief in the case. In 2004, Bush said "What they do in the privacy of their house, consenting adults should be able to do."

Previously, Bush said he supports states' rights when it came to marriage, however, after the Massachusetts Supreme Court decision in Goodridge v. Department of Public Health, Bush announced his support for a U.S. constitutional amendment banning same-sex marriage on February 24, 2004. Due to his support of the Federal Marriage Amendment (FMA), the Log Cabin Republicans declined to endorse the reelection of George W. Bush in 2004 by a vote of 22–2. The Palm Beach County chapter in Florida did endorse him, resulting in the revocation of their charter. On September 22, 2004, the Abe Lincoln Black Republican Caucus (ALBRC), a group of young urban Black gay Republicans, voted in a special call meeting in Dallas, Texas, to endorse President Bush for re-election. In an October president debate, Bush said he did not know whether homosexuality is a choice or not. In October 2004, Bush said that he supported allowing the states to establish civil unions for same-sex couples.

In 2007, Bush threatened to veto the Local Law Enforcement Hate Crimes Prevention Act of 2007, which would have included sexual orientation in hate crimes, and Employment Nondiscrimination Act of 2007. In December 2008, the Bush administration refused to support the U.N. declaration on sexual orientation and gender identity at the United Nations that condemns the use of violence, harassment, discrimination, exclusion, stigmatization, and prejudice based on sexual orientation and gender identity.

== Barack Obama ==
=== Illinois state senator ===
Barack Obama supported legalizing same-sex marriage when he first ran for the Illinois State Senate in 1996. When he ran for re-election to the Illinois Senate in 1998, he was undecided about legalizing same-sex marriage and supported including sexual orientation to the state's non-discrimination laws. During his time as a state senator he cosponsored a bill amending the Illinois Human Rights Act to include protections for LGBTQ people which prohibits discrimination on the basis of sexual orientation and gender identity in the workplace, housing, and all public places and supported Illinois gender violence act.

=== U.S. Senator from Illinois ===
Obama supported civil unions, but opposed same-sex marriage when he ran for the U.S. Senate in 2004 and for U.S. president in 2008. He supported civil unions that would carry equal legal standing to that of marriage for same-sex couples, but believed that decisions about the title of marriage should be left to the states.

During his time as senator, Obama co-sponsored the Employment Non-Discrimination Act, Matthew Shepard Local Law Enforcement Hate Crimes Prevention Act, Tax Equity for Domestic Partner and Health Plan Beneficiaries Act, and Early Treatment for HIV Act.

In the 109th United States Congress, Obama received a score of 89% by the Human Rights Campaign.

In 2006, Obama voted against the Federal Marriage Amendment, which would have defined marriage as between one man and one woman in the U.S. Constitution.

In 2007, Senator Obama said he opposed the 1996 Defense of Marriage Act and the don't ask, don't tell policy when it passed and supported repealing it. He also said that homosexuality is not a choice, he supported adoption rights for same-sex couples, and he would work as president to extend the 1,000 federal rights granted to marriage couples to couples in civil unions. He also voted for the Kennedy Amendment to the National Defense Authorization Act for Fiscal Year 2008 that would expand federal jurisdiction to reach serious, violent hate crimes perpetrated because of the victim's sexual orientation and gender identity and the Tom Lantos and Henry J. Hyde United States Global Leadership Against HIV/AIDS, Tuberculosis and Malaria Reauthorization Act.

In the 2008 presidential election, he expressed his opposition to state constitutional bans on same-sex marriage in California, and Florida on the November ballot, but stated in a 2008 interview that he personally believes that marriage is "between a man and a woman" and that he is "not in favor of gay marriage." In the 110th United States Congress, Obama received a score of 94% by the Human Rights Campaign. In the 2008 election, Obama received the endorsement of the following gay rights organizations: Houston GLBT Political Caucus, Human Rights Campaign, and the National Stonewall Democrats.

=== Presidency ===
==== First term ====
Barack Obama took many definitively pro-LGBTQ stances. In March 2009, his administration reversed Bush administration policy and signed the U.N. declaration that calls for the decriminalization of homosexuality. In June 2009, Obama became the first president to declare the month of June to be LGBTQ pride month; Bill Clinton had declared June Gay and Lesbian Pride Month. Obama would do the same for every following June of his presidency. On June 17, 2009, Obama signed a presidential memorandum allowing same-sex partners of federal employees to receive certain benefits. The memorandum does not cover full health coverage. On October 28, 2009, Obama signed the Matthew Shepard and James Byrd Jr. Hate Crimes Prevention Act, which added gender, sexual orientation, gender identity, and disability to the federal hate crimes law. In October 2009, he nominated Sharon Lubinski to become the first openly gay U.S. marshal to serve the Minnesota district.

On January 4, 2010, he appointed Amanda Simpson the Senior Technical Advisor to the Department of Commerce, making her the first openly transgender person appointed to a government post by a U.S. president. He has appointed the most U.S. gay and lesbian officials of any U.S. president. At the start of 2010, the Obama administration included gender identity among the classes protected against discrimination under the authority of the Equal Employment Opportunity Commission (EEOC). On April 15, 2010, Obama issued an executive order to the Department of Health and Human Services that required medical facilities to grant visitation and medical decision-making rights to same-sex couples. In June 2010, he expanded the Family Medical Leave Act to cover employees taking unpaid leave to care for the children of same-sex partners. On December 22, 2010, Obama signed the Don't Ask, Don't Tell Repeal Act of 2010 into law.

On February 23, 2011, Obama instructed the Justice Department to stop defending the Defense of Marriage Act in court. In March 2011, the U.S. issued a nonbinding declaration in favor of gay rights that gained the support of more than 80 countries at the U.N. In June 2011, the U.N. endorsed the rights of gay, lesbian, and transgender people for the first time, by passing a resolution that was backed by the U.S., among other countries. On August 18, 2011, the Obama administration announced that it would suspend deportation proceedings against many undocumented immigrants who pose no threat to national security or public safety, with the White House interpreting the term "family" to include partners of lesbian, gay and bisexual people.

On September 30, 2011, the Defense Department issued new guidelines that allow military chaplains to officiate at same-sex weddings, on or off military installations, in states where such weddings are allowed. On December 5, 2011, the Obama administration announced the United States would use all the tools of American diplomacy, including the potent enticement of foreign aid, to promote LGBTQ rights around the world. In March and April 2012, Obama expressed his opposition to state constitutional bans on same-sex marriage in North Carolina, and Minnesota. On May 3, 2012, the Federal Bureau of Prisons has agreed to add an LGBTQ representative to the diversity program at each of the 120 prisons it operates in the United States.

On May 9, 2012, Obama publicly supported same-sex marriage, the first sitting U.S. president to do so. Obama told an interviewer that:

over the course of several years as I have talked to friends and family and neighbors when I think about members of my own staff who are in incredibly committed monogamous relationships, same-sex relationships, who are raising kids together, when I think about those soldiers or airmen or Marines or sailors who are out there fighting on my behalf and yet feel constrained, even now that Don't Ask Don't Tell is gone, because they are not able to commit themselves in a marriage, at a certain point I've just concluded that for me personally it is important for me to go ahead and affirm that I think same sex couples should be able to get married.

In the 2012 election, Obama received the endorsement of the following gay rights organizations: Equal Rights Washington, Fair Wisconsin, Gay-Straight Alliance Network, Human Rights Campaign, and the National Stonewall Democrats. The American Civil Liberties Union (ACLU) gave Obama a score of 100% on the issue of gays and lesbians in the U.S. military and a score of 75% on the issue of freedom to marry for gay people.

==== Second term ====
On September 3, 2013, same-sex spouses of Service members were eligible for military benefits.

On January 7, 2013, the Pentagon agreed to pay full separation pay to service members discharged under "Don't Ask, Don't Tell." Obama also called for full equality during his second inaugural address on January 21, 2013: "Our journey is not complete until our gay brothers and sisters are treated like anyone else under the law—for if we are truly created equal, then surely the love we commit to one another must be equal as well." It was the first mention of rights for gays and lesbians or use of the word gay in an inaugural address.

On March 1, 2013, Obama, speaking about Hollingsworth v. Perry, the U.S. Supreme Court case about Proposition 8, said "When the Supreme Court asks do you think that the California law, which doesn't provide any rationale for discriminating against same-sex couples other than just the notion that, well, they're same-sex couples—if the Supreme Court asks me or my attorney general or solicitor general, 'Do we think that meets constitutional muster?' I felt it was important for us to answer that question honestly. And the answer is no." The administration took the position that the Supreme Court should apply "heightened scrutiny" to California's ban—a standard under which legal experts say no state ban could survive.

On August 7, 2013, Obama criticized the Russian gay propaganda law. On December 26, 2013, Obama signed the National Defense Authorization Act for Fiscal Year 2014 into law, which repealed the ban on consensual sodomy in the UCMJ. On February 16, 2014, Obama criticized the Uganda Anti-Homosexuality Act, 2014. On February 28, 2014, Obama agreed with the governor of Arizona Jan Brewer's veto of SB 1062. Obama included openly gay athletes in the 2014 Olympic delegation, namely Brian Boitano and Billie Jean King (who was later replaced by Caitlin Cahow). This was done in criticism of Russia's anti-gay law. On July 21, 2014, Obama signed Executive Order 13672, adding "gender identity" to the categories protected against discrimination in hiring in the federal civilian workforce and both "sexual orientation" and "gender identity" to the categories protected against discrimination in hiring and employment on the part of federal government contractors and sub-contractors. Obama was criticized for meeting with anti-gay Ugandan president Yoweri Museveni at a dinner with African heads of state in August 2014.

Later in August 2014, Obama made a surprise video appearance at the opening ceremony of the 2014 Gay Games. On February 10, 2015, David Axelrod's Believer: My Forty Years in Politics was published. In the book, Axelrod revealed that Obama lied about his opposition to same-sex marriage for religious reasons in 2008 United States presidential election. "I'm just not very good at bullshitting," Obama told Axelrod, after an event where he stated his opposition to same-sex marriage, according to the book. In 2015, the U.S. appointed Randy Berry as its first Special Envoy for the Human Rights of LGBTQ Persons.

In April 2015, the Obama administration announced it had opened a gender-neutral bathroom within the White House complex, located in the Eisenhower Executive Office Building next door to the West Wing. Obama also responded to a petition seeking to ban conversion therapy (inspired by the death of Leelah Alcorn) with his pledge to advocate for such a ban. Also in 2015, when Obama declared May to be National Foster Care Month, he included words never before included in a White House proclamation about adoption, stating in part, "With so many children waiting for loving homes, it is important to ensure all qualified caregivers have the opportunity to serve as foster or adoptive parents, regardless of race, religion, sexual orientation, gender identity, or marital status. That is why we are working to break down the barriers that exist and investing in efforts to recruit more qualified parents for children in foster care." He was the first president to explicitly say gender identity should not prevent anyone from adopting or becoming a foster parent.

On October 29, 2015, Obama endorsed Proposition 1 in Houston, Texas. On November 10, 2015, Obama officially announced his support for the Equality Act of 2015. In June 2016, Obama and Vice President Joe Biden met with the victims and families of victims of the Orlando nightclub shooting. Obama and Biden laid 49 bouquets of white roses to memorialize the 49 people killed in the tragedy impacting the LGBTQ community. On June 24, 2016, Obama designated the Stonewall National Monument in Greenwich Village, Lower Manhattan, as the first national monument in the United States to honor the LGBTQ rights movement. On October 20, 2016, Obama endorsed Kate Brown as Governor of Oregon. On November 8, Brown became the first openly LGBTQ person to be elected governor in the United States. Brown is a bisexual woman who has also come out as a survivor of sexual assault and domestic violence. Before being elected in her own right, Brown had assumed the governorship due to a resignation. During that time, she signed legislation to ban conversion therapy on minors.

== Donald Trump ==
Donald Trump opposed expanding LGBTQ rights. As President, he rolled back LGBTQ rights and appointed anti-LGBTQ officials, but also gay officials such as Scott Bessent as Secretary of the Treasury and Richard Grenell as special presidential envoy for special missions. He opposed the Equality Act, which has been one of the highest priorities of LGBTQ rights groups since same-sex marriage was enacted by the Supreme Court. Long before his 2016 campaign, Trump opposed the legalization of same-sex marriage; during his 2016 campaign, he pledged to appoint anti-LGBTQ Justices to the Supreme Court. His administration banned transgender people from serving in the military and attempted to legally redefine gender in order to undermine nondiscrimination protections for transgender, non-binary, and intersex people.

His administration argued before the Supreme Court that Title VII of the Civil Rights Act of 1964 does not protect gay or transgender Americans from discrimination (though the Court ultimately decided in favor of LGBTQ rights in this matter). His Cabinet rolled back non-discrimination requirements for homeless shelters, allowing them to discriminate against homeless transgender youth. His Education Secretary, Betsy DeVos, rolled back protections for LGBTQ students. All LGBTQ references were removed from the websites of the White House, Department of State, and Department of Labor minutes after Trump took office. Trump did not allow refugees to enter the country on the basis of their fleeing from LGBTQ-related discrimination. Trump was the first president to speak at the Value Voters Summit hosted by the Family Research Council.

=== First presidency ===
==== HIV/AIDS policy ====
In 2017, Trump dissolved the Office of National AIDS Policy (ONAP, founded in 1993) and the Presidential Advisory Council on HIV/AIDS (PACHA, founded in 1995). His 2019 budget proposal did not include any funding for two existing programs run under the Ryan White HIV/AIDS Program.

==== Transgender rights ====
The Trump administration has attacked transgender rights on multiple fronts.

- Students' bathroom access: On February 10, 2017, the Department of Justice dropped a defense of transgender students' access to bathrooms. Obama-era guidance had allowed students to use bathrooms corresponding to their gender identity. The right had been challenged by a Texas District Court, and the Department of Justice had previously asked the court to lift its stay, but the Department of Justice (under the new Attorney General Jeff Sessions) withdrew its request. On February 22, 2017, Trump reversed a directive from the Obama administration that allowed transgender students who attend public schools to use bathrooms that correspond with their gender identity. Education Secretary Betsy DeVos, questioned before the House Education and Labor Committee on April 10, 2019, about the previous rollback, acknowledged that she had been aware of the effects of the stress of discrimination on transgender youth; these effects include depression, anxiety, lower attendance and grades, and attempted suicide. In May 2019, the Supreme Court declined to hear a challenge to a Pennsylvania school regarding its bathroom policy, suggesting that schools may continue to set their own policies to accommodate transgender students.
- Student athletics: On May 15, 2020, the Department of Education's Office for Civil Rights wrote a 45-page letter threatening to withhold federal funding from specific school districts in Connecticut and from the Connecticut Interscholastic Athletic Conference (CIAC) if they continued to allow transgender girls to compete on girls' teams. The Department of Education claimed that including transgender athletes on girls' teams is a violation of Title IX. In September 2020, about $6 million, spread over two years and delivered by a Federal Magnet Schools Assistance Program Grant, was at stake for Connecticut.
- Military ban: Trump succeeded in implementing restrictions on transgender military personnel, an idea he first announced via Twitter. On July 26, 2017, Trump tweeted that transgender individuals would not be accepted or allowed to serve "in any capacity" in the U.S. military, citing medical costs and disruption related to transgender service members. This announcement took Pentagon officials by surprise. There were about 6,000 transgender military personnel on active duty, according to a 2014 study, and the Trump administration provided no evidence that they pose a problem. Many key military leaders advocated for continuing to support transgender servicemembers. They include "the chiefs of the Army, Navy and Air Force; the commandant of the Marine Corps; and the incoming commandant of the Coast Guard," as well as retired leaders like Vice Admiral Donald C. Arthur, Major General Gale Pollock, and Rear Admiral Alan M. Steinman (who served as the surgeon general or equivalent of the Navy, Army, and Coast Guard respectively and who coauthored a Palm Center report in April 2018). On August 25, 2017, Trump directed the Pentagon to stop admitting any new transgender individuals into the military and to stop providing medical treatments for sex reassignment, intended to take effect on March 23, 2018. On August 29, 2017, Secretary of Defense James Mattis put a freeze on expelling transgender service members who are currently in the military, pending a study by experts within the Departments of Defense and Homeland Security. Federal courts temporarily delayed the implementation of the Trump administration's proposed ban by issuing four injunctions. On November 23, 2018, the day after Thanksgiving, the Trump administration formally requested the U.S. Supreme Court to issue an emergency ruling on whether transgender personnel may continue to serve, and on January 22, 2019, without hearing arguments or explaining its own decision, the Court allowed the Trump administration to move ahead with the ban. On March 12, 2019, the Department of Defense released a memorandum with specifics of the ban, essentially allowing existing personnel to continue to serve if they had already come out as transgender prior to the memorandum, but disqualifying anyone who was newly discovered to have a transgender body, identity, or history.
- Employment: On October 4, 2017, the attorney general published a memo considering "discrimination against transgender individuals" in employment and concluding that Title VII of the Civil Rights Act of 1964 "does not prohibit discrimination based on gender identity per se. This is a conclusion of law, not policy." On August 16, 2019, the Justice Department filed a brief with the U.S. Supreme Court arguing that "Title VII does not prohibit discrimination against transgender persons based on their transgender status," "gender identity," or "disconnect" between biological sex and gender identity. The brief related to a pending case, Harris Funeral Homes v. EEOC.
- Prisoners' rights: In May 2018, the Trump administration ordered the Bureau of Prisons to house transgender prisoners according to their "biological sex." Treating prisoners as members of the gender with which they identify "would be appropriate only in rare cases." This reverses guidance created by the Obama administration in 2012, and it conflicts with the Prison Rape Elimination Act of 2003. In 2018, the Cibola County Correctional Center in New Mexico operated a unit for transgender women; the women were housed together regardless of the reason for their detention. The building served as a federal prison, county jail, Immigration and Customs Enforcement detention, and housing for asylum-seekers. Reporters were granted access for the first time in June 2019; there were 27 inmates at that time.
- Defining gender as sex: On October 21, 2018, The New York Times revealed a Department of Health and Human Services memo that planned to establish a definition of gender based on sex assignment at birth across federal agencies, notably the departments of Education, Justice, and Labor, which, along with Health and Human Services, are responsible for enforcing Title IX nondiscrimination statutes. The Justice Department would have to approve any new definition that Health and Human Services might suggest. The memo argued in favor of a definition of gender "on a biological basis that is clear, grounded in science, objective and administrable" and the government's prerogative to genetically test individuals to determine their sex. Over the following days, thousands of protesters gathered in Washington, D.C.; San Diego; Portland, Maine; Minneapolis; Los Angeles; Milwaukee; Boston; and other cities across the country, and on November 2, nearly 100 lawmakers signed a letter to HHS Secretary Alex Azar asking him not to implement this change. On July 8, 2019, the State Department created the Commission on Unalienable Rights to initiate philosophical discussions of human rights that are grounded in the Catholic concept of "natural law" rather than modern identities based on gender and sexuality. Most of the twelve members of the commission have a history of anti-LGBTQ comments.
- Healthcare: Since 2016, the Department of Health and Human Services (HHS) has explicitly interpreted the word "sex" in the nondiscrimination provisions of the Affordable Care Act (Section 1557) to recognize and include transgender people, entitling them to the same services to which everyone else is entitled, although a federal court injunction on December 31, 2016, prevented HHS from enforcing its nondiscrimination rule. Under the Trump administration, HHS lawyers began working on permanently reversing the rule, and on May 24, 2019, the proposed reversal was formally announced. On October 15, 2019, federal judge Reed O'Connor vacated the nondiscrimination rule, saying that it violated the Religious Freedom Restoration Act. His ruling meant that federally-funded healthcare insurers and providers may deny treatment or coverage based on sex, gender identity or termination of pregnancy, even if the services are medically necessary. On November 1, 2019, HHS announced that, effective immediately, recipients of taxpayer-funded grants from HHS are permitted to discriminate on the basis of sexual orientation and gender identity, as it will no longer enforce the 2016 rule known as 81 F.R. 89393. This change affects "HIV and STI prevention programs, opioid programs, youth homelessness services, health professional training, substance use recovery programs, and many other life-saving services," according to the National Center for Transgender Equality. In April 2020, HHS acknowledged that the pending rule to replace Section 1557 (which was then under review by the Justice Department) followed the federal court order that "vacated the gender identity provisions" of Section 1557. The replacement rule was revealed on June 12, 2020.
- Homelessness: On May 22, 2019, HUD proposed a new rule to weaken the 2012 Equal Access Rule, an existing federal nondiscrimination protection that requires equal access to housing regardless of sexual orientation or gender identity. (The previous day, Housing and Urban Development (HUD) Secretary Ben Carson had told Congress that he had no plans to change this protection.) Under the proposed change, shelters receiving federal funding would be given leeway in "determining sex for admission to any facility" based on factors including the transgender person's "official government documents," the shelter operators' "religious beliefs," and any invented "practical concerns" or concerns about "privacy" or "safety." This could allow shelters to place transgender women in men's housing or to deny transgender people admission altogether. Within the proposed rule, HUD said that the treatment of transgender people would be considered valid as long as the shelter applied its own rules consistently and that this would not conflict with HUD's existing nondiscrimination policy. HUD has been moving in the direction of weakening this rule since 2017 when it withdrew proposals to require emergency shelters to post information about LGBTQ rights and updated its website to remove guidance for serving transgender people. In July 2020, HUD proposed a rule to allow shelters to turn away any women they judged to look physically masculine, examining "factors such as height, the presence (but not the absence) of facial hair, the presence of an Adam's apple, and other physical characteristics which, when considered together, are indicative of a person's biological sex."

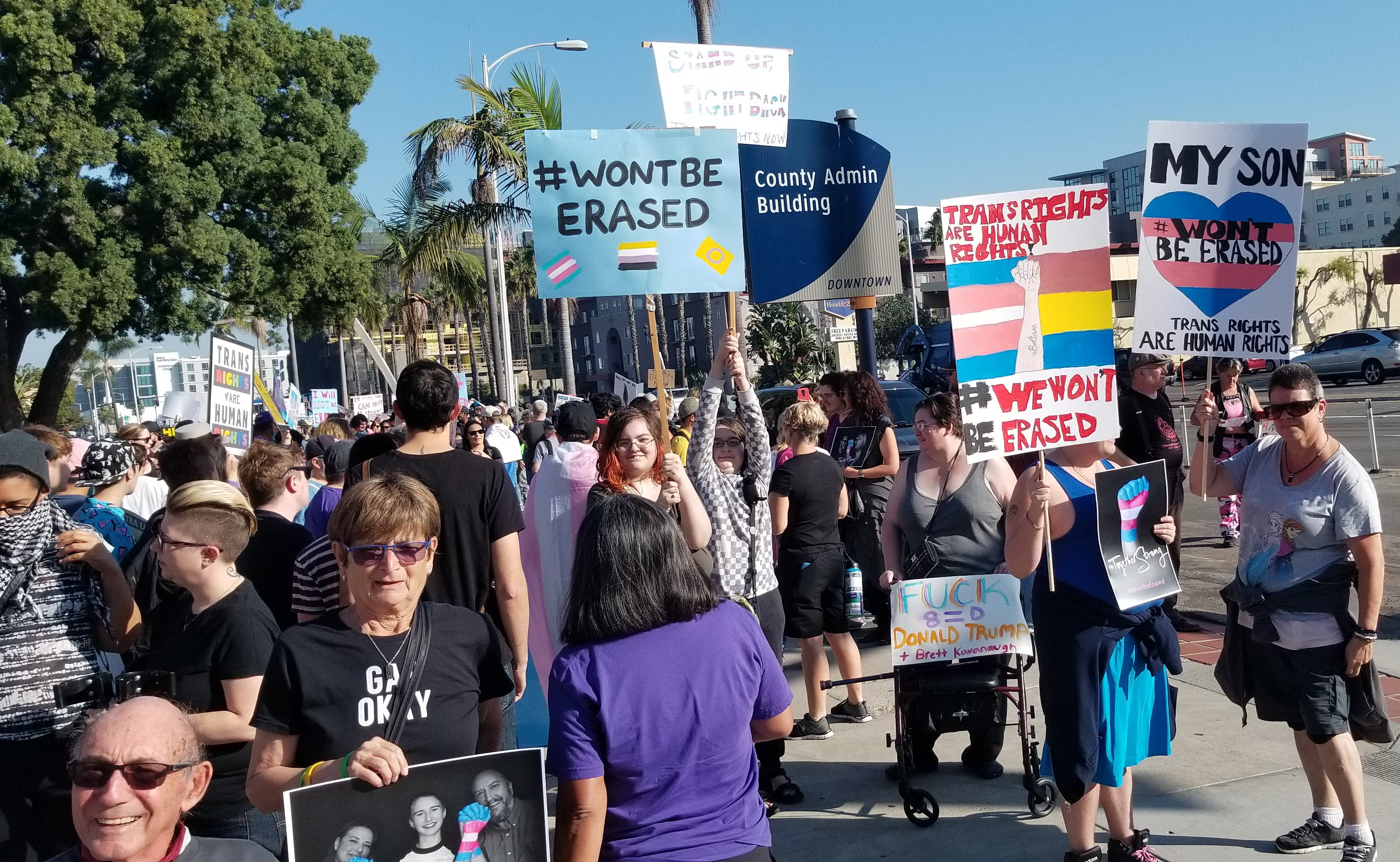
On October 27, 2018, hundreds of protesters marched in downtown San Diego to protest the Trump administration's plans to define gender as sex assigned at birth.

==== Census and other data collection ====
Early on, the Trump administration interrupted the government's efforts to begin counting LGBTQ-identified people. In March 2017, the U.S. Census Bureau released its proposed questions for the 2020 census (the census is conducted once every ten years) and the American Community Survey (conducted annually). For the first time ever, the proposed questions covered topics about sexual orientation and gender identity. However, the questions were immediately retracted. The Census Bureau claimed that the topic had been included "inadvertently" (in fact, it was included because nearly 80 members of Congress had asked for it the previous year). The Census Bureau added: "This topic is not being proposed to Congress for the 2020 Census or American Community Survey. The report has been corrected."

Ultimately, questions about same-sex relationships were added back into the census, but this limited approach doesn't offer a way to attribute lesbian, gay, or bisexual identity to those who are not currently in any relationship or who are in a different-sex relationship, nor can it attribute transgender identity to anyone. The same month, the Trump administration released a draft of the annual National Survey of Older Americans Act Participants (NSOAAP), administered by Department of Health and Human Services (HHS). Questions about sexual orientation and gender identity added in 2014 were removed from the 2017 draft. In April 2019, HHS indicated their intention to stop asking foster youth, parents and guardians to self-report sexual orientation to the Adoption and Foster Care Analysis and Reporting System.

==== Employment nondiscrimination ====
The Trump administration opposed efforts to protect LGBTQ people from employment discrimination. In January 2017, minutes after Trump was inaugurated, LGBTQ-related content was removed from the White House, State Department and Labor Department websites. On March 27, 2017, Trump reversed a directive from the Obama administration (Executive Order 13673, "Fair Pay and Safe Workplaces") that had required companies with large federal contracts to prove their compliance with LGBTQ protections and other labor laws. In November 2017, the General Services Administration removed "sexual orientation" and "gender identity" from its Obama-era nondiscrimination guidelines. In March 2018, the Department of Health and Human Services removed lesbian and bisexual resources from its website. In December 2019, the Interior Department removed "sexual orientation" from its nondiscrimination guidelines.

On July 26, 2017, the Trump administration intervened in a private employment lawsuit, Zarda v. Altitude Express, Inc. The Department of Justice, taking the opposite side of the Equal Employment Opportunity Commission, urged a federal appeals court to rule that the Civil Rights Act of 1964 does not prohibit job discrimination based on sexual orientation. The court ruled, however, that it did. On June 15, 2020, the Supreme Court agreed, ruling 6–3 that "an employer who fires an individual merely for being gay or transgender defies the law." On November 30, 2018, Trump signed the United States-Mexico-Canada trade agreement which contained a footnote exempting the United States from complying with the agreement's call for an end to "sex-based discrimination". Near the end of Trump's term, on December 7, 2020, the administration finalized a rule allowing faith-based employers to discriminate against LGBTQ employees in their contracts with the federal government.

==== Other ====
A major way the Trump administration enabled discrimination is by providing exemptions to antidiscrimination law on the basis of "conscience" or "religious freedom." On December 5, 2017, when asked by a White House reporter if Trump agreed that it would be okay for bakers to put up signs in their business windows saying "We don't bake cakes for gay weddings," as his solicitor general had argued before the Supreme Court, White House Press Secretary Sarah Huckabee Sanders said that the president believes in religious liberty and "that would include that." On January 18, 2018, the Department of Health and Human Services (HHS) announced the creation of the Conscience and Religious Freedom Division within its Office for Civil Rights (OCR).

Its purpose was to enforce federal laws that related to "conscience and religious freedom"; that is, to enable individuals and businesses to exempt themselves from obeying nondiscrimination laws. On January 23, 2019, the U.S. Department of Health and Human Services (HHS) said that Miracle Hill Ministries, a foster care agency in Greenville, S.C., could be exempted from an Obama-era nondiscrimination regulation. Miracle Hill would continue to receive federal funds and was allowed to refuse services to prospective foster parents who are non-Christian or LGBTQ, although it was required to refer the rejected applicants to another agency. HHS cited the Religious Freedom Restoration Act (RFRA) as a basis for allowing federally funded Christian groups to discriminate against non-Christians.

In August 2019, the U.S. Department of Labor, also referencing the RFRA, proposed a new rule to exempt "religious organizations" from obeying nondiscrimination law in their employment practices if they invoke "sincerely held religious tenets and beliefs" as their reason to discriminate. In June 2020, the Justice Department filed a brief with the Supreme Court in support of Catholic Social Services (CSS) of Philadelphia, which sought the right to decline same-sex couples as prospective foster parents within the public foster care system and to refer them to another agency.

==== International relations ====
On October 3, 2017, the Trump administration voted against a UN resolution to condemn the death penalty (which condemned the use of that penalty for homosexuality in particular), thus making the United States one of only 13 countries to vote against the resolution (including Saudi Arabia where the death penalty for gay sex is practiced). However, this was in accordance with longstanding policy, as the Obama administration had also voted against it. Jessica Stern, executive director of the LGBTQ rights group OutRight, said the group criticized the Trump administration's "many rights violations, its many abuses of power from LGBTI violations to xenophobia, but this particular instance is not an example of a contraction of support on LGBTI rights... It would be a mistake to interpret its opposition to a death penalty resolution to a change in policy." In September 2020, the Trump administration (along with co-signatures it had gathered from 57 countries) proposed that the United Nations emphasize "religious freedom" in place of LGBTQ rights when discussing "international human rights."

Richard Grenell, the openly gay U.S. Ambassador to Germany, led a single meeting on February 19, 2019, with 11 activists from different European countries; it appeared that no U.S. individuals or groups were invited. The Trump administration claimed that this dinner party represented a new campaign to decriminalize homosexuality worldwide. However, the next day, the president seemed unaware of it. (In the official White House transcript of that interview, Trump asked the reporter to repeat the question, and finally responded, "I don't know, uh, which report you're talking about. We have many reports.") Grenell said the United States did not have a "new policy" but was rather simply making a "new push"; this push consisted of asking for support from European countries in treating U.S. economic aid to other countries as a bargaining chip.

On May 31, 2019, Trump tweeted that Americans should "stand in solidarity with the many LGBT people who live in dozens of countries worldwide that punish, imprison, or even execute" people for their sexual orientation. He referenced his administration's "global campaign to decriminalize homosexuality." It was the only time during his presidency that he tweeted the word "LGBT" (excepting, one year later, a retweet of his press secretary's praise of his "LGBT community" record). It was also the only time he tweeted the word "Pride" in an LGBTQ context. Despite Trump's apparent call for international solidarity, that same week, his administration instructed U.S. embassies not to fly the Pride flag. Additionally, later in 2019, when Zambia sentenced two men to 15 years in prison for having sex, the U.S. ambassador to the country expressed his outrage. The United States did not support his position but instead recalled him from his role.

In early 2020, it was reported that Grenell's consulting firm had been paid over $100,000 in 2016 to provide public relations support to Viktor Orbán's government in Hungary (a government widely recognized for its anti-LGBTQ policies), which Grenell had not disclosed under the Foreign Agents Registration Act before working for the Trump administration. When Grenell resigned his ambassadorship on June 1, 2020, he left no one obviously in charge of any pro-LGBTQ "push" or "campaign," and, three months later, a senior advisor at the Council for Global Equality dismissed Grenell's defunct campaign as "a series of self-promoting Twitter photos." In August 2020, Grenell began serving as an advisor for the American Center for Law & Justice, an organization that has long supported criminalizing homosexuality in African countries.

=== Vice President Mike Pence ===
Mike Pence opposed the expansion of LGBTQ rights throughout his political career. In May 2016, as Indiana governor, he said that states should dictate which bathroom transgender students may use. He said this in response to direction given by the Obama administration to allow students nationwide to use the bathroom corresponding to the gender with which they identify. A month later, on June 15, 2016, Trump announced Pence as his vice presidential running-mate.

The decision was criticized by LGBTQ advocates, as Pence was known for opposing same-sex marriage and supporting "religious freedom laws" that allow individuals and companies to claim religious exemptions from providing services to LGBTQ people, including an Indiana law that he signed while governor. During Trump's presidential campaign, while discussing gay rights with a legal scholar, Trump allegedly joked that Pence "wants to hang them all"; the comment was revealed in October 2017 after Trump and Pence were already in office. Secretary Hillary Clinton, who ran against Trump in the 2016 presidential election, called Pence "the most extreme pick in a generation." In 1993, Pence published numerous anti-LGBTQ letters in the Indiana Policy Review Foundation publication Indiana Policy Review, allegedly including one that urged employers to not hire members of the LGBTQ community, claiming they are "promiscuous," carry "extremely high rates of disease," and are "not able bodied."

In 2000, Pence's congressional campaign website stated that Congress should fund the Ryan White Care Act only after an audit confirmed that "organizations that celebrate and encourage the types of behaviors that facilitate the spreading of the HIV virus" would be ineligible for funding, and that "resources should be directed toward those institutions which provide assistance to those seeking to change their sexual behavior." The latter comment has been interpreted by some as a statement of support for conversion therapy, an accusation that was not addressed until after Pence's election as vice president, when Pence's spokesperson called the accusation a "mischaracterization." However, conversion therapy was endorsed within the Republican Party platform adopted at the July 2016 convention.

In a 2006 speech, he said that "the deterioration of marriage and family" causes "societal collapse" and that "God's idea" is to prevent same-sex marriage. In 2007, he voted against the Employment Non-Discrimination Act which would have banned discrimination based on sexual orientation. In 2010, he opposed allowing soldiers to openly identify as gay. Although gay and bisexual men in the United States remain disproportionately affected by HIV, accounting for two-thirds of all new HIV diagnoses in 2016, Pence gave a speech for World AIDS Day 2018 without mentioning LGBTQ people. (The previous year, Trump had given the World AIDS Day speech with the same omission.)

=== Second presidency ===
Upon taking office for a second non-consecutive term, Trump signed a series of executive orders, described as a "shock and awe" campaign, that tested the limits of executive authority, with many drawing immediate legal challenges. On January 20, 2025, an executive order was passed by Trump, which saw the U.S. government removing all federal protections for transgender individuals, or recognition of transgender people, with transgender people being completely written out of the law. The U.S. Supreme Court determined that the prohibition imposed by Trump on gender-affirming medical care for transgender minors during his second term was maintained, and that parents were permitted to withdraw their children from classrooms when storybooks containing LGBTQ characters were being read. Additionally, the court affirmed Trump's restriction on transgender individuals serving in the military.

In June 2025, WorldPride, an international festival advocating for LGBTQ rights, took place in Washington, D.C. Activists from across the globe gathered to express their solidarity with the American community as the nation's far-right administration retracted its backing for LGBTQ rights.

== Joe Biden ==
On Joe Biden's first day in office, he signed an executive order banning employment and housing discrimination on the basis of sexual orientation and gender identity. This executive order interprets the United States Supreme Court decision Bostock v. Clayton County more broadly than the Trump administration had. The executive order also mandates that transgender children be allowed to use the locker rooms and bathrooms of their gender identity, and be allowed to participate in the sport of their gender identity too, and although it does not mandate all schools and states must follow the order, if they were to defy it, the Federal Government could deny funding to said states or schools. Currently, there are multiple states considering bills which would bar transgender athletes from competing in the sport of their gender identity, and even one state, Idaho, has enacted a bill which bans trans girls from playing in the sport of their gender identity, which is currently the subject of an ongoing court battle in the 9th Circuit (see Hecox v. Little). Despite this, the Biden administration has not made any statements on said bills, and whether or not it will deny funding to states that have enacted them, or are considering enacting them.

The court ruling expanded Title VII of the Civil Rights Act of 1964 to ban employment discrimination against LGBTQ employees but did not explicitly ban discrimination outside of employment. The executive order signed by President Biden ordered all federal agencies to review existing regulations and policies that prohibit sex discrimination, and to revise them as necessary to clarify that "sex" includes sexual orientation and gender identity. Also on Biden's first day in office, his press secretary, Jen Psaki, announced in a press conference that the president would soon reverse the government's ban on transgender people from serving openly in the military. Biden had originally said that reversing the ban would be an action taken "on day one," but this was delayed, perhaps because his nominee for Secretary of Defense, Lloyd Austin, had not been confirmed yet. This ban was reversed by executive order on January 25, 2021, allowing transgender people to serve in the military again.

On March 26, 2021, Rachel Levine became the U.S. assistant secretary for health and "the highest-ranking openly transgender official in U.S. history" (according to the Washington Post). On May 10, 2021, the Department of Health and Human Services affirmed that gay and transgender people's access to healthcare was protected under the Affordable Care Act, reversing a Trump administration policy and restoring an Obama administration policy. On June 15, 2022, Biden signed another executive order designed to blunt recent anti-LGBTQ state legislation. The order directed the Department of Health and Human Services to partner with state child welfare agencies to prevent anti-LGBTQ discrimination, identify and address barriers to LGBTQ people receiving federal anti-poverty benefits, and create a Bill of Rights for LGBTQI+ Older Adults; ordered the Department of Housing and Urban Development to identify and address barriers to housing for LGBTQ people; and expanded the federal government's commitment to data collection on sexual orientation and gender identity by creating a coordinating committee to guide such data collection across all federal agencies. In addition, it would order the federal government to curb federal funding for the practice of Conversion therapy, and ask the Federal Trade Commission to consider whether it constitutes an unfair or deceptive act. It would also set up programs to expand access to suicide prevention resources for LGBTQ youth.
