= Ottendorf =

Ottendorf may refer to:

== People ==
- Nicholas Dietrich, Baron de Ottendorf

== Places ==
=== Austria ===
- Ottendorf an der Rittschein, in Styria

=== Germany ===
- Ottendorf-Okrilla, in the district of Bautzen, Saxony
- Ottendorf, Schleswig-Holstein, in the Rendsburg-Eckernförde district, Schleswig-Holstein
- Ottendorf, Thuringia, in the Saale-Holzland-Kreis district, Thuringia
- Ottendorf (Sebnitz), a village in the municipality of Sebnitz, Sächsische Schweiz-Osterzgebirge district, Saxony
- A part of Bahretal in the Sächsische Schweiz-Osterzgebirge district, Saxony
