= Oliver Spencer =

American military officer and judge (1736-1811)

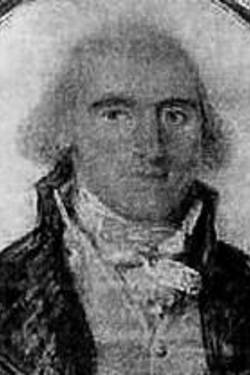
- Born: October 6, 1736; East Haddam, Connecticut
- Died: January 22, 1811 (aged 74) Columbia, Ohio, US
- Allegiance: United States
- Branch: Infantry
- Service years: 1776–1781
- Rank: Colonel
- Conflicts: Springfield action (1776); Connecticut Farms action (1777); Battle of Brandywine (1777); Battle of Germantown (1777); Battle of Monmouth (1778); Sullivan Expedition (1779)
- Other work: Probate judge

Colonel Oliver Spencer (6 October 1736 – 22 January 1811) was an American military officer and judge who served during the American Revolutionary War and received a special commission to enlist and lead one of 16 Additional Continental Regiments. He was born in Connecticut and later moved to New Jersey, where he married Anna Ogden and became a tanner. He joined the revolutionary cause and engaged a British force in December 1776 as a major of New Jersey militia. On 15 January 1777 during the Forage War, his militiamen captured 70 Hessian soldiers.

George Washington proceeded to authorize him to recruit Spencer's Additional Continental Regiment. As colonel, he led this unit at Brandywine and Germantown in 1777 and Monmouth in 1778. His regiment participated in the Sullivan Expedition in 1779 and was disbanded at the beginning of 1781. The conflict having ruined his home and his tanning business, he moved to Ohio, where he served as a probate judge and militia commander. He was the nephew of General Joseph Spencer.

== Early career ==
Oliver Spencer was born at East Haddam, Connecticut on 6 October 1736. His parents were Samuel Spencer (b. 1708) and Jerusha Brainerd. His father, who was the oldest of the 12 children of Isaac Spencer (b. 1678) and Mary Selden, was a captain in the wars against the French in Canada. One of his uncles, Joseph Spencer became a Major General in the Continental Army. A second uncle was a prominent Presbyterian clergyman by the name of Elihu Spencer (b. 1721).

After his father died of smallpox when Spencer was about 14 years old, he went to live with the family of Robert Ogden in Elizabethtown, New Jersey. When he reached the age of 21, he wed Robert's daughter Anna Ogden. The newly married couple moved back to East Haddam where they lived for five years. Returning to Elizabethtown, Spencer became partner in his father-in-law's successful tanning business. Under his management, the commercial enterprise continued to prosper until the outbreak of the American Revolution.

== New Jersey campaign ==
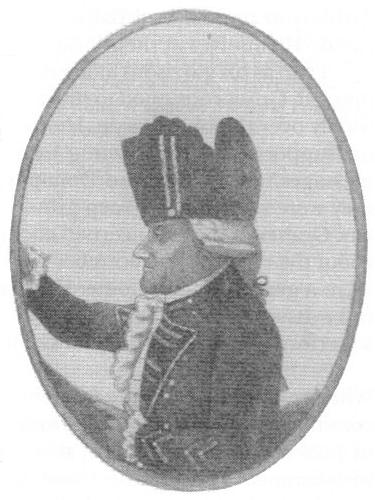
Alexander Leslie

Spencer was appointed major of the 2nd Essex County Militia Regiment. When this organization's Colonel Elias Dayton took command of the 3rd New Jersey Regiment, it left Lieutenant Colonel Thomas in charge. When George Washington's army retreated though Elizabethtown in late 1776, the militiamen briefly joined it. From New Brunswick Washington sent the three militia regiments from Essex, Morris, and Sussex Counties to operate against the British flank from the mountains of northern New Jersey. When the militiamen reached Morristown, New Jersey, the commander of the three units resigned, as did Thomas.

The British army commander Sir William Howe decided to halt his successful campaign at the Delaware River and hold New Jersey for the winter with 14 garrisons. Howe left Major General James Grant in charge of the garrisons and returned to New York City. Desiring to pacify the countryside, Grant ordered Brigadier General Alexander Leslie to march to Princeton via Springfield and Bound Brook on 17 December 1776. As Leslie's brigade neared Springfield, it was detected by Spencer's militia which held the town. Sending a courier to Chatham to warn the militia brigade of the British approach, Spencer withdrew his men from Springfield. At Briant's Tavern, Spencer joined the main body of militia and the men advanced to contact the British. With Captain Seeley on the right, Captain Brookfield on the left, Colonel Lindsley on the left center, and Spencer on the right center, the New Jersey militia skirmished with Leslie's brigade near Woodruff's Tavern. The engagement lasted about one hour before darkness fell, upon which the militia withdrew about one mile. During the action Spencer's horse was killed under him. When the militiamen discovered the British were gone in the morning, they were greatly encouraged at their apparent success.

After a Hessian brigade was crushed at the Battle of Trenton on 26 December 1776 and a British brigade was mauled at the Battle of Princeton on 3 January 1777, Howe and Lord Charles Cornwallis hastily withdrew their forces from nearly all of New Jersey. This strategic retreat was immediately followed by the Forage War in which bodies of New Jersey militia and Continental Army troops harassed British and Hessian forage parties. On 16 January at Connecticut Farms, 300 New Jersey militia led by Spencer ambushed 100 Hessian troops on a foraging mission. In the Connecticut Farms action the Hessians were defeated, with losses of one killed and 70 captured. Another source noted an operation in which Spencer's men killed or captured almost 100 "mounted Waldecks". but did not give a date. He was also credited for boldly attacking an enemy picket near Elizabethtown.

== Spencer's Additional Regiment ==
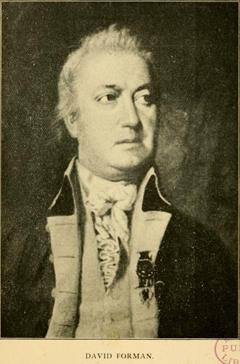
David Forman led the other Additional Regiment from New Jersey.

On 27 December 1776, the Continental Congress authorized Washington to form 16 new battalions of infantry. These became known as the "Sixteen Additional Regiments". Immediately, the commanding general began appointing officers to recruit these new units. Washington offered two of the regiments to New Jersey militia officers, Spencer and Samuel Griffin. Spencer accepted but Griffin declined and David Forman was appointed instead. On 11 January 1777, Spencer's Additional Continental Regiment came into existence as part of Washington's main army. During the spring, the unit assembled at Monmouth County, New Jersey. Seven of its companies hailed from New Jersey, while one company was recruited from Pennsylvania. Spencer became colonel and Eleazer Lindsley became the regiment's lieutenant colonel. Their commissions dated from 15 January 1777. No major was listed.

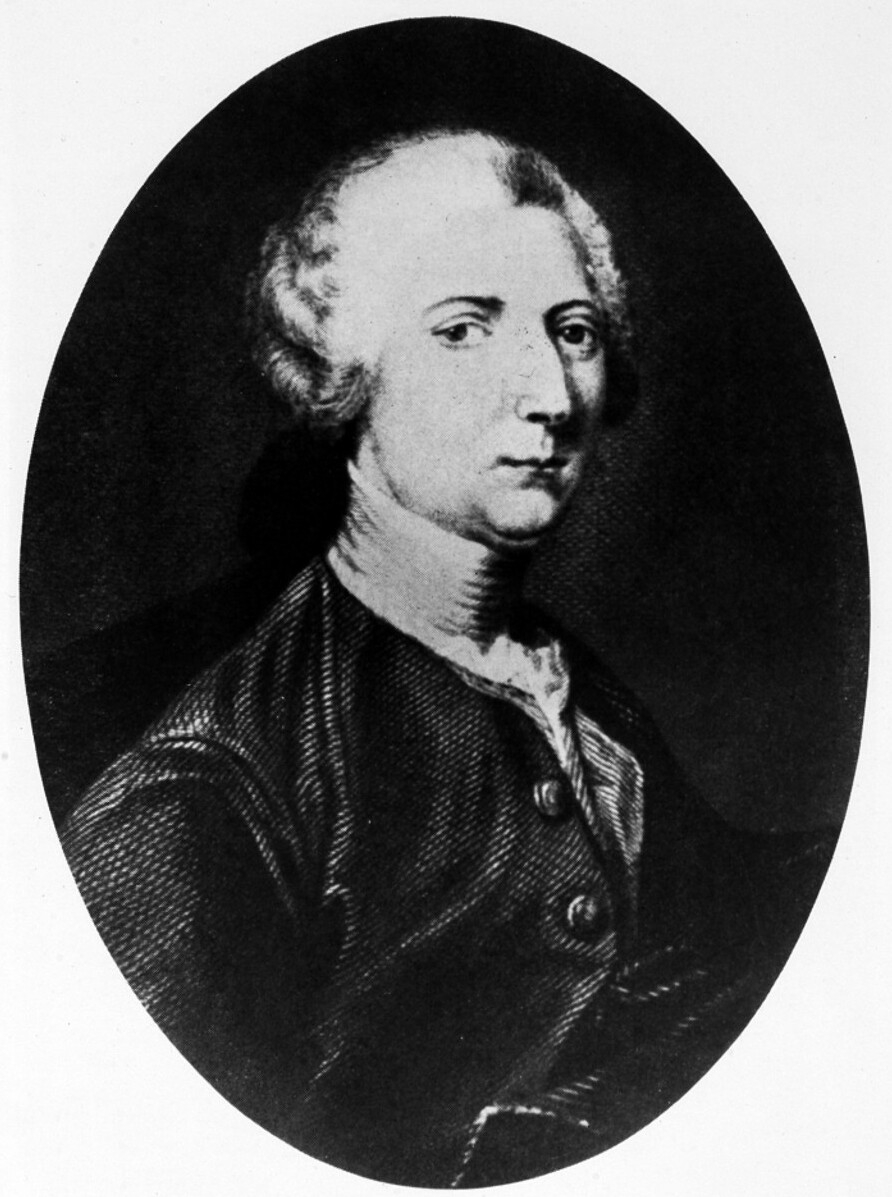
Thomas Conway

On 22 May 1777, Spencer's Regiment transferred into the 3rd Pennsylvania Brigade which was commanded by French-Irish volunteer Thomas Conway. The brigade fought in Lord Stirling's division at the Battle of Brandywine on 11 September 1777. Conway's brigade, which also included the 3rd, 6th, 9th, and 12th Pennsylvania Regiments, was driven off the field. At the Battle of Germantown on 4 October 1777, Conway's Brigade led John Sullivan's right column. When contact was made with the 2nd Light Infantry Battalion, Conway's men pressed straight on over Mount Airy while Sullivan's Maryland division formed on its right and Anthony Wayne's Pennsylvania division moved to its left. After meeting resistance from the 40th Foot at the Chew House, Sullivan ordered Conway's brigade to shift to a position on the right flank of the Maryland division. At this point Sullivan's men passed west of the Chew House and into the fog and battle smoke. Eventually, Sullivan's men were attacked at a time when they had run low on ammunition. After losing a few senior officers, the troops began a hasty retreat.

Francis B. Heitman listed Spencer as the commanding officer of his regiment at Valley Forge. Together with Malcolm's Additional Continental Regiment and the four Pennsylvania regiments, Spencer's formed part of Conway's brigade. At the Battle of Monmouth on 28 June 1778, the 3rd Pennsylvania Brigade included 39 officers, 56 sergeants, and 343 rank and file in the six units listed above. Before a substantial number of men were detached to units of the advance guard, the brigade numbered 42 officers, 112 non-coms, 20 staff, and 445 rank and file. Late in the day, Wayne pushed forward against the British left flank with the 3rd Pennsylvania, Spencer's, and Malcolm's Regiments. At first, the 1st Grenadier Battalion was isolated but soon the 33rd Foot came to its help and drove back Wayne's thrust.

Spencer's Regiment was assigned to the Highlands Department in July 1778 and transferred to the Middle Department in November of that year. In April 1779 the regiment absorbed Forman's Additional Continental Regiment and part of Malcolm's regiment to form nine companies. Lindsley retired in May and his replacement as lieutenant colonel was William S. Smith. John Burrowes joined the regiment in July 1779. In late June, the unit became part of the New Jersey Brigade. Spencer's Regiment marched with the Sullivan Expedition in the summer of 1779. With the 1st and 2nd New Jersey Regiments, the unit formed part of William Maxwell's 1st Brigade. At the Battle of Newtown on 29 August, Sullivan routed a force of Indians and Tories. That was the only serious fighting as the expedition visited large scale destruction on Iroquois villages. Spencer's Regiment was assigned to the Highlands Department in September 1780 and disbanded on 1 January 1781.

== Post-Revolution ==
Following the War, Spencer joined other New Jersey officers in becoming a founding member of the Society of the Cincinnati in the State of New Jersey.

Spencer's home and tannery in Elizabethtown were thoroughly despoiled by the enemy. He suffered additional losses because of the depreciation of the currency. Determined to find a living, he moved with his family to the Miami Valley in Ohio where he bought three sections of land. When he arrived in Columbia, Ohio, the governor of the territory Arthur St. Clair made him the colonel of the local militia and probate judge for Hamilton County. One source gives a glowing account of Spencer's "spotless" character and generosity. He died at Columbia on 22 January 1811.
