= Elizabeth and Gershom Frazee House =

- U.S. National Register of Historic Places
- New Jersey Register of Historic Places
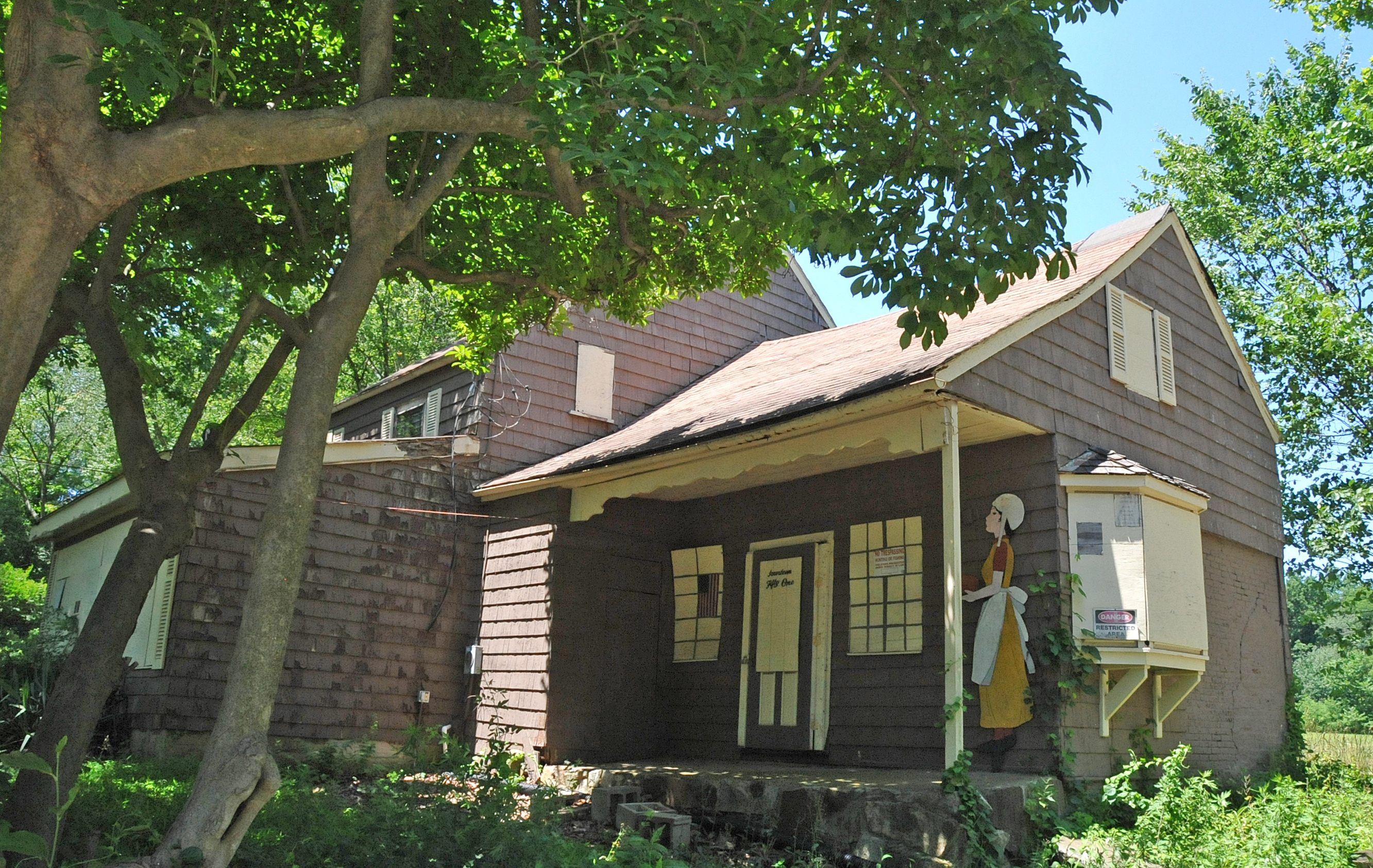

- Location within Union County, New Jersey Location within New Jersey Location within the United States
- Location: 1451 Raritan Road, Scotch Plains, New Jersey
- Coordinates: 40°37′00″N 74°22′01″W
- Built: c. 1761
- Built by: Gershom Frazee
- Architectural style: Colonial
- NRHP reference No.: 09000971
- NJRHP No.: 4560

Significant dates
- Added to NRHP: December 7, 2009
- Designated NJRHP: September 28, 2009

The Elizabeth and Gershom Frazee House is located at 1451 Raritan Road in the township of Scotch Plains in Union County, New Jersey, United States. Built around 1761, the historic frame house was added to the National Register of Historic Places on December 7, 2009, for its significance in architecture, industry, and military history. After the Battle of the Short Hills, on June 26, 1777, Elizabeth, "Aunt Betty", had an encounter with British General Charles Cornwallis. He refused the bread he had asked for after she said she gave it out of fear.

The house was built by Gershom Frazee, a joiner and furniture maker. In 1949, Franklyn Tuttle Terry and Ella Louise Terry of South Plainfield bought the property. They lived in the farmhouse and operated the Terry Lou Zoo. In 1998, the property was acquired by the township through eminent domain.

== See also ==
- National Register of Historic Places listings in Union County, New Jersey
