= Ottendorf's Corps =

- Active: 1776–1778
- Allegiance: Continental Congress of the United States
- Type: Light Infantry
- Size: 160
- Part of: Continental Army
- Engagements: Short Hills; Germantown; Brandywine

Commanders
- Notable commanders: Nicholas Dietrich, Baron de Ottendorf; Charles Armand

Ottendorf's Corps was raised on December 5, 1776, in eastern Pennsylvania for service with the Continental Army. Congress directed the corps would be composed of 150 privates, sergeants and corporals included, and that it be divided "into three companies, the first to consist of 60 men, light infantry, to be commanded by one captain and two lieutenants. The other two companies of hunters (Riflemen), 45 men each, also commanded by one captain, two lieutenants."

The corps is named for its founder, Nicholas Dietrich, Baron de Ottendorf.

The corps saw action at the Battle of Germantown and Battle of Brandywine. In April 1778 the Corps was broken up, one company was transferred to Armand's Legion and the others became independent companies of dragoons.
