= David Forman (general) =

Continental Army officer (1745–1797)

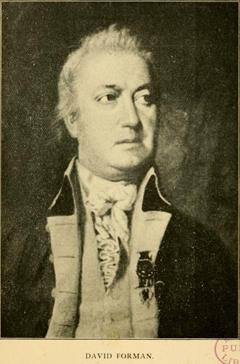
- Born: 3 November 1745; Monmouth County, New Jersey, British America
- Died: 12 September 1797 (aged 51) New Providence, The Bahamas
- Allegiance: United States
- Branch: Infantry
- Service years: 1776–1783
- Rank: Colonel (Continental Army); Brigadier General (State militia)
- Conflicts: American Revolutionary War; Battle of Germantown; Battle of Monmouth
- Other work: Society of the Cincinnati

David Forman (November 3, 1745 – September 12, 1797) was an American Continental soldier from New Jersey during the American Revolutionary War.

== Early life ==
Forman was born in Englishtown in Monmouth County, Province of New Jersey, to Joseph Forman and Elizabeth Lee. His father was a wealthy shipowner and he was educated at Princeton.

== American Revolution ==
At the start of the American Revolutionary War he rallied to the patriot cause and was appointed lieutenant colonel of a New Jersey state regiment. When his commander assumed command of the brigade, he was promoted colonel of the regiment during the New York and New Jersey Campaign in 1776. At the time of the battles of Trenton and Princeton Forman's regiment waged a merciless war against the American Loyalists of Monmouth County. Then and later he became known as "Devil David" or "Black David" for his zeal in suppressing the local Tories. In January 1777, the Continental Congress authorized him to raise Forman's Additional Continental Regiment with the rank of colonel in the Continental Army.

In March 1777 he was promoted brigadier general of New Jersey militia. He led a militia brigade in an unsuccessful attack at Germantown in October 1777. He resigned his general's commission because of political troubles but continued to assist the revolutionary cause. At the Battle of Monmouth he served on the staff of Charles Lee as an adviser. When local guides failed to appear on time, he directed the vanguard on the correct route. When Charles Hector, comte d'Estaing's French fleet appeared off the coast soon afterward, Forman stepped in as a liaison between the French and George Washington. His regiment was absorbed by Spencer's Additional Continental Regiment in April 1779. He organized a system of outposts on the coast in 1780 that reported British and French ship movements. This information was passed on to Washington. Late in the war, he played a small role in the Asgill Affair.

=== Association of Retaliation ===
Forman was the leader of the "Association of Retaliation," a vigilante group that persecuted Loyalists during the American Revolution. Forman established the Retaliators, in 1780, to act as a shadow government to the duly elected county representatives. The Retaliators were largely centered around Monmouth County and faced much aggression from a rival faction of Loyalists, known as the "Board of Associated Loyalists."

== Career ==
Toward the end of the American Revolution and after the end of the war, he was a judge of the Monmouth County Court of Common Pleas, which he was first elected to in 1781. He was a member of the New Jersey State Council from 1780 to 1785.

== Personal life ==
After the war he had portraits done by James Sharples and in about 1784 by Charles Willson Peale.

He and his wife Ann Marsh had eleven children; of these only five daughters survived him. A slaveowner, he bought a property at Natchez, Mississippi and sent 60 of his slaves to work there in 1789.

He was admitted as an honorary and then original member of The Society of the Cincinnati in the state of New Jersey and served as Vice President of the New Jersey Society from 1791 to 1793. He was also a freemason and member of Trinity Lodge #3 in Freehold, New Jersey.

In 1794, he moved to Maryland. In 1796 he traveled to Natchez where he had a debilitating stroke the following spring. He took a ship home, but it was captured by a British privateer and brought into The Bahamas where he died on September 12, 1797.

== Notes ==
- Fischer, David Hackett (2004). Washington's Crossing. New York, N.Y.: Oxford University Press. ISBN 978-0-19-518159-3.
- Forman, Charles. "Three Revolutionary Soldiers: David Forman, Jonathan Forman, Thomas Marsh Forman".
- McGuire, Thomas J. (2006). The Philadelphia Campaign, Volume I. Mechanicsburg, Penn.: Stackpole Books. ISBN 0-8117-0178-6.
- McGuire, Thomas J. (2007). The Philadelphia Campaign, Volume II. Mechanicsburg, Penn.: Stackpole Books. ISBN 978-0-8117-0206-5.
- Wright, Robert K. Jr. (1989). The Continental Army. Washington, D.C.: US Army Center of Military History. CMH Pub 60-4.
