= Forman's Additional Continental Regiment =

- Active: 1777–1779
- Allegiance: (United States) Continental Congress
- Type: Infantry
- Size: 4 Companies
- Part of: Continental Army
- Nickname(s): Forman's Red Coats
- Colors: Red Coats
- Engagements: Battle of Germantown (1777); Battle of Monmouth (1778)

Commanders
- Notable commanders: Colonel David Forman

Forman's Additional Continental Regiment was an American infantry unit that served for little more than two years during the American Revolutionary War. Authorized on 11 January 1777, the unit was recruited from southern New Jersey and Maryland. Raised by Colonel David Forman in early 1777, it saw service with the Continental Army in the Philadelphia Campaign of 1777 and 1778. In April 1779 the regiment was absorbed by Spencer's Additional Continental Regiment.

== History ==
Forman's Additional Continental Regiment came into being on 11 January 1777 for service with the Continental Army and was assigned to the Main Army. The unit was one of 16 so-called Additional Continental Regiments. David Forman, previously the colonel of a Regiment of New Jersey State Troops (Levy), was appointed commander. Samuel Griffin had begun organizing the regiment but refused the command when he found that he would not be promoted to the rank of General. When Forman took over, he continued Griffin's initial work. As usual with the Additional Regiments, George Washington gave Forman wide authority to choose his own officers. The regiment's field officers were Lieutenant Colonel Thomas Henderson who served from 12 January 1777 to October 1777, and Major William Harrison who served from 1 May 1777 to 1 July 1778.

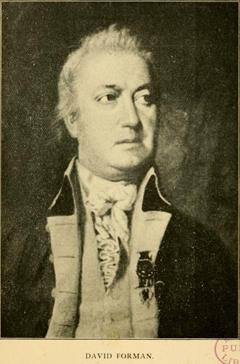
David Forman

Forman's Additional Regiment was recruited in the spring of 1777 from men of southern New Jersey and Maryland. The majority of recruits and officers hailed from Monmouth County, New Jersey, due to their affiliation with Forman in civilian life. The unit had a strength of four companies due to its limited success in offering payment bonuses and other incentives to join, something commonplace for all of the Continental Additional Regiments. Receiving captured British uniforms in April 1777 from ship's seized in Raritan Bay, NJ, Forman's men appeared more like their enemy than their own compatriots in the rest of the Continental Army. The Regiment participated in the brief campaign in Northern New Jersey in June 1777, serving as scouts along the Raritan Bay and North Jersey coastline and as a defense/workforce for the newly established Continental Salt Works in Monmouth County, NJ.

The regiment's first action was at the Battle of Germantown on 4 October 1777, serving in William Smallwood's 1,500-strong left flank column, which was composed mostly of Maryland and New Jersey militia. Forman, who held a brigadier general's commission in the militia, commanded all 600 New Jersey militia troops that were present. Among the New Jersey soldiers under Forman, more than one observer distinguished between the militia and "General Forman's Red Coats". This account by Major Asher Holmes of the 1st Regiment of the Monmouth County Militia reinforces the issuance of captured British uniforms earlier that year for Forman's Regiment. Likewise of note, Smallwood's Maryland militia included a portion of "enlisted men", who were assumed to be Continentals. The left flank column overran a few outposts, but finally were driven off by the Queen's Rangers and the grenadier and light companies of the Brigade of Guards by the end of the day's fighting. Forman's "Red Coats" and the other Maryland "enlisted men" appear to have performed well during their rear guard movements when they helped cover the withdrawal of the entire militia column.

After the Battle of Germantown, Forman's Regiment returned to New Jersey with the NJ Militia Brigade under Forman's command. Forman's orders from Washington and New Jersey's Governor William Livingston desired him to remain in NJ with the hopes of raising close to 2,000 militia volunteers for temporary Continental service before the end of the year. With nowhere to garrison the men of his regiment, Forman dispatched his troops back to his Salt Works in Monmouth County, NJ where they worked and protected the site from raiding British and Loyalist troops. Following the Battle of Red Bank on October 22, 1777, three-quarters of Forman's Regiment were sent as reinforcements to Fort Mercer and in pursuit of the remaining British and German troops east of the Delaware River. Although too late to help the Continental garrison at Fort Mifflin, Forman's men remained in the Fort Mercer garrison until mid-November before they crossed the Delaware River and joined the Continental Army at White Marsh, Pennsylvania. Although taking no part in the Battle of White Marsh the men of Forman's Regiment do appear on the Regimental Muster Rolls of the Continental Army when they move from White Marsh to the winter encampment at Valley Forge.

Forman's Additional Regiment remained at Valley Forge until it took part in the Monmouth Campaign in June 1778. The regiment is not listed in Brendan Morrissey's order of battle, due to the regiment's attachment to Colonel Israel Shreve's 2nd New Jersey Regiment in early April 1778. At this time Forman was under investigation by NJ's governor William Livingston over his rank and responsibilities in the state militia and his handling of the Continental Salt Works in Manasquan, New Jersey. Forman officially retired from the NJ State Militia and devoted his time strictly with the Continental Army for the coming campaign year after being unable to resolve differences with Livingston. Forman personally served on Charles Lee's staff during the battle on 28 June. On 1 April 1779, the remaining soldiers joined Spencer's Additional Continental Regiment and Forman's Regiment ceased to exist. Another source states that the regiment was dissolved on 1 July 1778 and the men transferred to the New Jersey Line.

== Service record ==
Designation	Date	Brigade	Department
Forman's Additional Regiment	11 January 1777	none	Main Army
Forman's Additional Regiment	1 April 1779	none	consolidated with Spencer's Additional Continental Regiment

== Bibliography ==
- Boatner, Mark M. III (1994). Encyclopedia of the American Revolution. Mechanicsburg, Pa.: Stackpole Books. ISBN 0-8117-0578-1.
- "From George Washington to James Mease, 17 April 1777," Founders Online, National Archives, version of January 18, 2019. – [Original source: The Papers of George Washington, Revolutionary War Series, vol. 9, 28 March 1777 – 10 June 1777, ed. Philander D. Chase. Charlottesville: University Press of Virginia, 1999, pp. 194–195.]
- Heitman, Francis Bernard (1914). Historical Register of Officers of the Continental Army during the War of the Revolution. Washington, D.C.: Rare Book Shop Publishing Company.
- "To George Washington from William Livingston, 10 October 1777," The Papers of George Washington, Revolutionary War Series, vol. 11, 19 August 1777 – 25 October 1777, ed. Philander D. Chase and Edward G. Lengel. Charlottesville: University Press of Virginia, 2001, pp. 477–478.
- "To George Washington from Major Benjamin George Eyre, 25 October 1777," The Papers of George Washington, Revolutionary War Series, vol. 11, 19 August 1777 – 25 October 1777, ed. Philander D. Chase and Edward G. Lengel. Charlottesville: University Press of Virginia, 2001, pp. 612–613.
- McGuire, Thomas J. (2007). The Philadelphia Campaign, Volume II. Mechanicsburg, Penn.: Stackpole Books. ISBN 978-0-8117-0206-5.
- Morrissey, Brendan (2008). Monmouth Courthouse 1778: The last great battle in the North. Long Island City, N.Y.: Osprey Publishing. ISBN 978-1-84176-772-7.
- Wright, Robert K. Jr. (1989). The Continental Army. Washington, D.C.: United States Army Center of Military History. CMH Pub 60-4.
- "General Orders, 10 April 1778," The Papers of George Washington, Revolutionary War Series, vol. 14, 1 March 1778 – 30 April 1778, ed. David R. Hoth. Charlottesville: University of Virginia Press, 2004, pp. 447–448.
