= William Malcolm =

American Revolution officer (1745–1791)

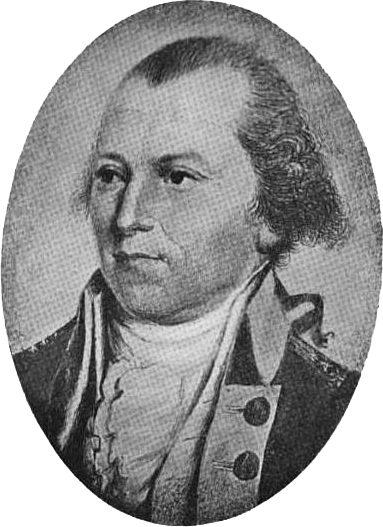
- Portrait by Edward Greene Malbone

Member of the New York State Assembly
- In office 1774–1774

Personal details
- Born: 23 January 1745 Glenrothes, Scotland
- Died: 1 September 1791 (aged 46) New York City, New York, U.S.
- Spouses: Abigail Tingley (m. 1765; died 1770) Sarah Ayscough (m. 1772)
- Children: Richard Montgomery Malcolm; Samuel Bayard Malcolm
- Parent: Richard Malcolm, Bt.

Military service
- Allegiance: United States (New York (state)) New York
- Branch/service: Continental Army; New York State Militia
- Rank: Brigadier General
- Commands: Malcolm's Additional Continental Regiment
- Battles/wars: Revolutionary War; Battle of Long Island; Battle of White Plains; Battle of Trenton; Battle of Princeton

General William Malcolm (January 23, 1745 – September 1, 1791) was a New York City merchant and officer in the American Revolution. He commanded Malcolm's Regiment, with Aaron Burr as his second in command.

== Early life ==
William Malcolm was born in Glenrothes, Scotland on January 23, 1745, and was a member of the Clan Malcolm. He was the third son of Richard Malcolm, Baronet of Balbedie and Innertiel in the county of Fife, Scotland. When he came to America in 1763, he brought a number of family portraits and other valuables.

== Career ==
In 1763, he moved to New York City as agent of a Glasgow firm of which he was a partner, and established himself as an import/export merchant. His business was in Queen Street, now known as Pearl Street. The same year he joined the Society of St. Andrew and was its secretary from 1765 to 1766, treasurer and secretary from 1772 to 1774, one of the managers in 1784, and vice president from 1785 to 1787.

Malcolm grew wealthy, and as his influence increased he took part in politics and government, including serving as a member of the New York Assembly in 1774.

=== Revolutionary War service ===
Malcolm was also active in the militia, and volunteered for military service during the American Revolution. He served in New York's military and the Continental Army throughout the Revolution, including assignments as Deputy Adjutant General of the Northern Department under Horatio Gates.

In 1777, Malcolm was appointed to command a regiment. Called Malcolm's Additional Continental Regiment, he raised the organization and used his own funds to pay and equip it. He commanded as Colonel, with Aaron Burr as second in command and Lieutenant Colonel, though Burr was often the de facto commander as the result of Malcolm's detached assignments as Deputy Adjutant General or for other duties. Malcolm took part in the battles of Long Island, White Plains, Trenton and Princeton. He was with the Army during the 1777-1778 winter at Valley Forge, and he later commanded Continental forces in upstate New York.

Near the end of the Revolution he was appointed commander of the militia in New York, Kings and Richmond Counties with the rank of brigadier general.

=== Post-war ===
In 1784, and again in 1787, he was elected to the New York Provincial Congress where he supported Alexander Hamilton in his motion to restore the elective franchise to the Tories and he favored the United States Constitution. In 1785, he served on New York City's Board of Aldermen.

As head of the militia in and around New York City, Malcolm commanded George Washington's escort when Washington took the oath of office as the first president.

Malcolm was a Freemason as a member of St. John's Lodge No. 1 in New York City, a member of the Saint Andrew's Society and the Saint Nicholas Society, and a founder of New York City's Chamber of Commerce.

== Personal life ==
Malcolm was married twice. His first wife was Abigail Tingley, whom he married in 1765, and who died in 1770. His second wife was Sarah Ayscough, the daughter of Richard Ayscough and Catharine Bayard, whom he married on February 5, 1772. Together, they were the parents of:

- Richard Montgomery Malcolm (1776–1823), who married Ann Henry.
- Samuel Bayard Malcolm (1777–1817), who married Catherine Van Rensselaer Schuyler (1780–1875), the youngest daughter of Philip Schuyler. After his death, his widow married James Cochran (1769–1848).

William Malcolm died in New York City on September 1, 1791. He was buried in Manhattan's Brick Presbyterian Church Cemetery.

=== Descendants ===
Malcolm's descendants included members of the prominent Bayard, Schuyler and Montgomery families. His grandchildren, through his son, Samuel, included Philip Schuyler Malcolm (b. 1804), Catharine Elizabeth Malcolm (b. 1809), William Schuyler Malcolm (1810–1890), and Alexander Hamilton Malcolm (1815–1888).

Through his son, Richard, he was the grandfather of Sarah Ayscough Malcolm (1802–1888), who married Thomas P. Ball (1792–1744). His great-grandson was James Mortimer Montgomery (1855–1926).
