= Spencer's Additional Continental Regiment =

- Active: 1777–1781
- Allegiance: (United States) Continental Congress
- Type: Infantry
- Size: 8 to 9 companies
- Part of: Continental Army
- Engagements: Battle of Brandywine (1777); Battle of Germantown (1777); Battle of Monmouth (1778); Sullivan Expedition (1779)

Commanders
- Notable commanders: Colonel Oliver Spencer

Spencer's Additional Continental Regiment, sometimes referred to as the 5th New Jersey Regiment, was an American infantry unit that served for four years in the Continental Army during the American Revolutionary War. The Continental Congress authorized sixteen "Additional" Continental Regiments in late 1776 and Colonel Oliver Spencer accepted command of this regiment with rank from January 15, 1777.

Recruiting for Spencer's Regiment took place in numerous New Jersey counties but especially in Essex (now Union), Morris and Sussex Counties and adjacent Orange County in New York. When it assembled at Middlebrook, New Jersey in late May, 1777, nine companies comprised the regiment, including one independent Continental company raised in Pennsylvania. Spencer's Regiment was assigned to Brigadier General Thomas Conway's 3rd Pennsylvania Brigade in late May 1777 and was engaged at the Battle of Short Hills late that June. It was in the thick of the fighting at the Brandywine where it suffered heavy casualties. It sustained further losses during Germantown on October 4, 1777 when Conway's Brigade lead the advance of Wayne's and Sullivan's columns. After Conway was appointed Major General and Inspector General of the Continental Army, Spencer was in acting command of the Brigade throughout much of the brutal winter at Valley Forge. At the Battle of Monmouth in June 1778, Spencer's Regiment took part in Brigadier General Anthony Wayne's late afternoon attack on the British 1st Grenadier Battalion and fought at the hedgerow and Parsonage. It was detached from the 3rd Pennsylvania Brigade July 19, 1778 and assigned to the Hudson Highlands. It spent the winter on the New Jersey frontier at Minisink under Brigadier General Edward Hand.

During the spring of 1779, Spencer's Regiment absorbed the two remaining New Jersey companies of Forman's Additional Continental Regiment and those enlisted men credited to New York from Malcolm's Additional Continental Regiment when those units were reduced. Spencer's Regiment repaired the military road leading to the Susquehanna in advance of Sullivan's Expedition in the summer of 1779, during which it was assigned to the New Jersey Brigade. It overwintered at Jockey Hollow, between Mendham and Morristown, NJ. It lost a handful of men captured while on command at Paramus, NJ on April 16, 1780. In late May it was assigned to the front lines at Elizabethtown, New Jersey. Spencer's Regiment fought in the Battle of Connecticut Farms on June 6–7, 1780 where it suffered more losses than any other Continental unit engaged, including half the officer casualties in the Jersey Brigade and nearly half the wounded enlisted men.

The unit was transferred to the Highland Department in September 1780, where it garrisoned Stony Point until disbanded on the first of January 1781. At that time, Spencer's Regiment was the very last of the sixteen Additional Regiments still in the field that had never been formally incorporated into the Continental regiments of the various states. Its remaining men from New Jersey who had enlisted for the duration of the war were assigned to Captain John Holmes' company, 2nd New Jersey Regiment, while those from New York and a few who remained from Pennsylvania were transferred respectively to the New York and Pennsylvania Lines. Very few of Spencer's officers received new Continental appointments in 1781, but others returned to commands in various militia units.

== Service record ==
Designation	Date	Brigade	Department
Spencer's Additional Regiment	11 January 1777	none	Main Army
Spencer's Additional Regiment	22 May 1777	3rd Pennsylvania	Main Army
Spencer's Additional Regiment	19 July 1778	none	Highlands
Spencer's Additional Regiment	16 November 1778	none	Middle
Spencer's Additional Regiment	1 April 1779	none	consolidated
Spencer's Additional Regiment	26 June 1779	New Jersey	Main Army
Spencer's Additional Regiment	16 September 1780	none	Highlands
Spencer's Additional Regiment	1 January 1781	none	disbanded

== Bibliography ==
- Boatner, Mark M. III (1994). Encyclopedia of the American Revolution. Mechanicsburg, Pa.: Stackpole Books. ISBN 0-8117-0578-1.
- Heitman, Francis Bernard (1914). Historical Register of Officers of the Continental Army during the War of the Revolution. Washington, D.C.: Rare Book Shop Publishing Company.
- McGuire, Thomas J. (2006). The Philadelphia Campaign: Volume One: Brandywine and the Fall of Philadelphia. Mechanicsburg, Pa.: Stackpole Books. ISBN 0811701786.
- McGuire, Thomas J. (2007). The Philadelphia Campaign: Volume Two: Germantown and the Roads to Valley Forge. Mechanicsburg, Pa.: Stackpole Books. ISBN 978-0-8117-0206-5.
- Morrissey, Brendan (2008). Monmouth Courthouse 1778: The last great battle in the North. Long Island City, N.Y.: Osprey Publishing. ISBN 978-1-84176-772-7.
- Wright, Robert K. Jr. (1989). The Continental Army. Washington, D.C.: United States Army Center of Military History. CMH Pub 60-4.
