= Frederick Gotthold Enslin =

Continental Army officer convicted of sodomy in 1778

Gotthold Frederick Enslin
- Born: Gotthold Friderich Enslin; August 11, 1755; Oberkochen, Germany
- Died: July or August, 1800 (age 44-45); Boston, Massachusetts
- Occupations: Soldier, Bookkeeper

Lieutenant Gotthold Frederick Enslin (August 11, 1755 – July or August, 1800) was a Continental Army officer who was the focus of one of three possible cases of sodomy documented in the Continental Army under General George Washington.

== Early life and family ==
"Gotthold Friderich Ensslin" was christened the day after his birth in the Lutheran Church in Oberkochen, Wuerttemberg, Germany on 11 August 1755, son of Pastor Johann Friderich Ensslin and Magdalena Elisabetha Venningerin. He seems to have arrived in Philadelphia on the ship Union from Rotterdam on 30 September 1774.

== Military Career and Case ==
Enslin joined the Continental Army in March 1777, in an independent company affixed first to the 6th Virginia Regiment and later to Malcolm's Additional Continental Regiment.

The case began with a charge against an ensign for slander against another soldier. At Valley Forge, Pennsylvania, in February 1778, Ensign Anthony Maxwell was brought before a brigade court-martial charged with "propagating a scandalous report prejudicial to the character of Lieut. Enslin." Maxwell was ultimately acquitted of the charge.

In March 1778, Enslin was brought to trial before a general court-martial. According to General Washington's report: "...Lieutt. Enslin of Colo. Malcolm's Regiment tried for attempting to commit sodomy ..." Washington's secretary continues to describe the results of the trial: "His Excellency the Commander in Chief approves the sentence and with Abhorrence & Detestation of such Infamous Crimes orders Lieut. Enslin to be drummed out of Camp tomorrow morning...."

The diary of Lieutenant James McMichael records the sentence being carried out on 15 March 1778:

March 15. — I this morning proceeded to the grand parade, where I was a spectator to the drumming out of Lieut. Enslin of Col. Malcom's regiment. He was first drum'd from right to left of the parade, thence to the left wing of the army; from that to the centre, and lastly transported over the Schuylkill with orders never to be seen in Camp in the future. This shocking scene was performed by all the drums and fifes in the army— the coat of the delinquent was turned wrong side out."

== Later Life ==
Enslin moved to Boston, where he married a widow named Elizabeth Geyer, née Cooler, and worked as a bookkeeper. Their home was among those affected by the fire of 1787, though it appears they were able to rebuild and return. He died in the summer of 1800, age 44 or 45.

== See also ==
- Sexual orientation and gender identity in the United States military
