= 4th New Jersey Regiment =

- Active: September 16, 1776 – February 7, 1779
- Disbanded: February 7, 1779
- Allegiance: Continental Congress of the United States
- Type: Infantry
- Part of: New Jersey Line
- Engagements: American Revolutionary War: Battle of Brandywine; Battle of Germantown; Battle of Monmouth

The 4th New Jersey Regiment was raised on September 16, 1776, at Elizabethtown, New Jersey, for service with the Continental Army. The regiment would see action at the Battle of Brandywine, Battle of Germantown and the Battle of Monmouth. The regiment was disbanded on February 7, 1779, at Elizabethtown, New Jersey.
