= Malcolm's Additional Continental Regiment =

Malcolm's Additional Continental Regiment was one of the sixteen Additional Continental regiments authorized by the Second Continental Congress for the Continental Army. The regiment's colonel was William Malcolm, a wealthy New York City merchant, and its lieutenant colonel was Aaron Burr.

== History ==
The regiment was authorized January 7, 1777 for service in the Continental Army; earlier independent companies established by Malcolm saw service at the 1776 Battle of White Plains. The regiment was assigned June 27, 1777 to the Highlands Department, where it participated in the defense of the Hudson River. On September 23, 1777, it was assigned to the Main Army, and spent the winter at Valley Forge. One of its lieutenants, Frederick Gotthold Enslin, was drummed out of the army in February 1778 for allegedly attempting sodomy. The regiment next saw action in the 1778 Battle of Monmouth, and then spent its remaining time in the Highlands Department, where Colonel Malcolm was at times commander at West Point.

The regiment was broken up as follows: the Pennsylvania companies on January 13, 1779, were assigned to the 11th Pennsylvania Regiment, and the New York companies on April 1, 1779, were assigned to Spencer's Additional Continental Regiment.
