= Nicholas Dietrich, Baron de Ottendorf =

Government paid German mercenary

Nicholas Dietrich, Baron of Ottendorf, was a German mercenary who was paid on commission by the Continental Congress to gather and raise an independent corps in the Continental Army on December 5, 1776.

Dietrich had trouble properly organizing Ottendorf's Corps, and as a result, George Washington replaced him with Lieutenant Colonel Armand on June 11, 1777.

Orders to Armand [Middlebrook 11 June 1777] Sir, You are forthwith to take upon you the command of the corps heretofore under Major Ottendorf and to do all the duties thereof as commanding officer according to the rules and regulations established for the government of the Continental army and according to the usages of war. You will therefore endeavour by attentive observation and inquiry, to make yourself acquainted with every kind of duty practiced in the army, with the resolutions of Congress—the articles of war, and all general orders and conform punctually to them. You are permitted to use your endeavours to complete your corps to a full regiment: the necessary officers will be appointed in proportion to the progress you make and the number of men you collect. For the present you are to be under the immediate command of Major General Lincoln and to obey all his orders. Given at Head Quarters June 11th 1777. Df, in Alexander Hamilton’s writing, DLC:GW; Varick transcript, DLC:GW.

At the time of the Battle of the Short Hills, NJ June 26,1777, Ottendorff/Armand's Corps was scattered, with some being put under Armand's command while others followed Baron Dietrich. In 1781, the Baron and those that remained with him had eventually joined under the banner of the British Army. He was the one at NYC at Clinton's HQ that was the handler of the spy "Miss Jenny" who was at Kingsbridge and Rochambeau's HQ rpeporting back that Washington was about to attack New York. Instead the Americans and French headed to Yorktown while Clinton kept his troops at New York.

Diary of Johann Carl Buttner, 1839 Princeton University Library. War in the Countryside, The Battle and Plunder of the Short Hills, June 1777, by Frederic C. Detwiller, Interstate Press, 1977. Miss Jenny: https://web.archive.org/web/20070713083537/http://www.si.umich.edu/spies/stories-women-1.html
