= Robert K. Wright Jr. =

American military historian and author (born 1946)

- Born: 1946 (age 79–80)

Academic background
- Education: College of the Holy Cross (BA); College of William & Mary (MA, PhD)
- Thesis: Organization and Doctrine in the Continental Army, 1774-1784 (1981)

Academic work
- Discipline: American history
- Institutions: U.S. Naval Institute
- Military career
- Branch: United States Army; Virginia Army National Guard
- Service years: 1968–1996
- Rank: Major
- Units: 18th Military History Detachment
- Commands: 116th Military History Detachment
- Conflicts: Vietnam War: Gulf War; Desert Shield; Desert Storm

Robert K. Wright Jr. (born 1946) is an American military historian and author.

== Biography ==
Wright was raised in Connecticut. He attended the College of the Holy Cross in Worcester, Massachusetts, and earned a degree in history in 1968. He served in the U.S. Army as a Teletype operator in Berlin, after which he served with the 18th Military History Detachment where in 1969–1970 he devoted time recording the operations of the 25th Infantry Division in Vietnam.

Sergeant Wright received his honorable discharge in 1970. Under the GI Bill, he attended graduate school at the College of William and Mary in Virginia, earning a Master of Arts in 1968 and a Ph.D. in history in 1980. He spent the greater portion of his career at the United States Army Center of Military History in Washington, D.C. He was then commissioned in the Virginia Army National Guard in 1982 with the rank of captain where he commanded the 116th Military History Detachment in Manassas, Virginia, ultimately being promoted to a major. Wright served at Fort Bragg, North Carolina from 1989 to 1991, as the XVIII Airborne Corps command historian, where he deployed with the corps to Panama (Operation Just Cause) and the first Persian Gulf war (Operation Desert Shield-Desert Storm). He also deployed to Somalia (Operation Restore Hope) as an Army Reservist as part of the first-ever joint history team composed of historians from the Army, Navy, Air Force and Marine Corps. In 2002 Wright retired from government service as the chief of the Center of Military History's library and archives. Wright's 1983 book, The Continental Army, is widely considered the standard reference work covering the army of the American Revolutionary War.

== Books ==
- The Continental Army; 1983, United States Army Center of Military History Washington, D.C.; ISBN 0-16-001931-1. Available online.
- Soldier-Statesmen of the Constitution; 1987, United States Army Center of Military History, Washington, D.C.; ISBN 0-16-001955-9. Available online.
- Military Police; 1991, United States Army Center of Military History, Washington, D.C.; ISBN 0-16-030845-3. Available online.
- Story of the N.C.O., 1986 United States Army Center of Military History, Washington, D.C.
- The Tradition Continues: The Virginia Army National Guard, 1985.
- Airborne Forces at War: From Parachute Test Platoon to the 21st Century. Association of the U.S. Army and Naval Institute Press, Annapolis, Maryland, 2007.

== See also ==
- Continental Army

== Sources ==
- Trask, David F. "Robert K. Wright, Jr". U. S. Army Center of Military History. Archived from the original on December 13, 2007.
- Trask, David F., ed. (May 1982). "Robert K. Wright, Jr". The History Carper.
