= John Shreve =

Lieutenant during the American Revolutionary War

- Born: April 8, 1762; Burlington County, Province of New Jersey, British America
- Died: September 8, 1854 (aged 92); Alliance, Ohio, US
- Burial place: Mount Union Cemetery, Alliance, Ohio
- Relatives: Half-brother of Henry Miller Shreve
- Military career
- Allegiance: Continental Army
- Branch: 2nd New Jersey Regiment
- Service years: Autumn 1775 to March 20, 1781
- Rank: Lieutenant
- Conflicts: American Revolutionary War • Battle of Short Hills • Battle of Brandywine • Battle of Germantown • Battle of Springfield • Battle of Monmouth

John Shreve (April 8, 1762 – September 8, 1854) began his military service during the American Revolutionary War when he was thirteen years old.

== Early years ==
John Shreve was born on April 8, 1762 to Israel Shreve and Grace Curtis, his wife. John was welcomed into a large family of Quaker farmers that had settled in 1699 at Mount Pleasant in Mansfield Township, Province of New Jersey. The former Shreve homestead, Mount Pleasant, and the former Curtis homestead, Ogston, still sit as close neighbors on Mount Pleasant Road.

While living near Salem, Ohio, John wrote his autobiography on April 8, 1853: "My mother died when I was about nine years old. My father married again in about three years after." After Grace died on December 12, 1771, Israel married Mary Cokely in Christ Church, Philadelphia on May 10, 1773.

Prior to the outbreak of war in 1775, John was reportedly living with his father on a farm near the village of Rancocas in southern Burlington County.

== Revolutionary War ==
The 2nd New Jersey Regiment, or Jersey Line, was raised on October 9, 1775 with Israel Shreve appointed Lieutenant colonel. Israel brought John into his regiment where he received the rank of ensign. Three of Israel's brothers (Caleb, Samuel and William) and two of his nephews (Caleb's son, Benjamin, and William's son, Richard) also enlisted as volunteers and served during the Revolutionary War. They were all members of the Society of Friends, a religious group that supported pacifism.

On November 21, 1775, Israel and John were quartered in the nearby town of Burlington.

During March of 1776, Israel and John were stationed at Albany, New York where they were preparing for the planned invasion of Canada.

On June 12, 1776, Israel wrote a letter to John directing him to return home to Philadelphia and to attend school. Here he would receive the care and supervision of Mary, his stepmother.

After a new regiment was raised, Israel was appointed Colonel and John was appointed First Ensign. After the Battle of Short Hills, that occurred on June 26, 1777, John was promoted to the rank of Lieutenant on July 1.

During the Battle of Brandywine, on September 11, 1777, Israel was shot in the thigh. After spending the night in Darby, Pennsylvania, John accompanied him through Philadelphia to the residence of his uncle in New Jersey. He then escorted his father to Reading, Pennsylvania where Mary and their family were living. Subsequently, John rejoined the regiment at Whitemarsh.

During the winter of 1777-1778, John and Israel joined 12,000 members of the Continental Army in encampment at Valley Forge, seventeen miles west of Philadelphia.

During June of 1778, Israel's farm homestead near Georgetown, where John and the Shreve family lived before the war, was set ablaze and destroyed by British soldiers.

John resigned from military service on March 20, 1781.

John and Israel were admitted as original members in the Society of the Cincinnati in the State of New Jersey when it was established in 1783.

== Middle years ==
In mid-1784, John explored the territory between the Monongahela and Youghiogheny rivers of northwestern Fayette County, Pennsylvania. During September of 1784, John returned to New Jersey where he remained until 1788.

Abigail Ridgway, daughter of Solomon and Mary Burr Ridgway, was born on January 4, 1765 in Burlington County. On September 9, 1786, John and Abigail were joined in marriage by Quaker ceremony in Burlington County. They would become the parents of nine children.

In 1788, John, Abigail and their infant son Joseph removed to northwestern Fayette County where John "purchased a small farm of one hundred acres" of forested land about 33 miles south of Pittsburgh. Here they lived in a small log cabin that sat close to the Little Redstone Creek as it flowed to the southwest of present-day Perry Township before it merged with the Monongahela River at present-day Fayette City. The Shreve family were members of the nearby Providence Monthly Meeting.

On July 31, 1788, the Israel Shreve family, having removed from New Jersey, finally reached their destination in Rostraver Township in southwestern Pennsylvania. Here they resided in a farm homestead that Israel had leased. During fall of 1789, Israel Shreve and his family relocated to a farm homestead at present-day Perryopolis that he had leased from George Washington. John's family and his father's family would reside a few miles apart. After Israel died on December 14, 1799, John's family may have cared for Henry Miller Shreve, Israel's son and John's half brother, who was just 14 years old at the time.

John Jr. was born on November 15, 1789. Abigail died on June 4, 1808. John Jr. died on March 23, 1813. Mother and son were interred in the Providence Meeting House Cemetery.

The 1790 U.S. Federal Census lists "John Shreeves” as a resident of Washington Township, Fayette County, Pennsylvania. In 1790, Washington Township included present-day Perry Township. John's farm homestead, sitting where the Little Redstone Creek flowed between the Monongahela River and present-day Perry Township, was about ten miles north of Brownsville, a village on the east bank of the Monongahela River at the mouth of Redstone Creek.

On November 17, 1812, The Patriot newspaper reported that John Shreve was elected to the House of Representatives and would serve as a representative for Fayette County.

John Shreve, after clearing his land, made a modest living by farming. However, after shipping flour to foreign port cities, he was able to trade it for other commodities that he ultimately sold at New York City for a substantial profit. In his own words:

"I went three times with flour down the rivers Monongahela, Ohio and Mississippi to New Orleans, and took flour from New Orleans to the West Indies, one time to Havana, in the Island of Cuba; one time to Kingston in the Island of Jamaica. Took sugar from Cuba and rum from Jamaica to New York and paid six thousand seven hundred dollars duty on the sugar and rum."

Interestingly, local port officials made a record in the New Orleans Wharf Register of one unnamed boat with an arrival date of June 6, 1815, a fee of "$6", and the Noms des Proprietaires as "Shreve & Brown".

On January 25, 1814, The Patriot newspaper reported, "Mr. Shreve presented a petition from the shareholders of the Monongahela Bank of Brownsville, in Fayette County, praying for a charter of incorporation." The charter was granted and the bank would play a significant role in the growth of the economy of Brownsville.

On October 31, 1815, The Patriot newspaper reported that John Shreve had been re-elected to the House of Representatives to serve as a representative for Fayette County.

During late-May 1825, the Marquis de Lafayette visited Brownsville. After noticing John in the large crowd, the Marquis "held out both arms to embrace his old friend."

On November 5, 1829, John was granted a certificate of acceptance by Salem Monthly Meeting. Subsequently, he joined six of his children who had removed to the vicinity of Salem in Columbiana County, Ohio.

On June 1, 1840, John Shreve was listed as a pensioner for his military service in the Revolutionary War. The record shows that John was a resident in the home of his son, Joseph Shreve. Furthermore, they were both listed as residents of Lexington Township, Stark County, Ohio.

On February 24, 1841, the Salem Monthly Meeting of Friends terminated the membership of John Shreve for receiving a "pension for his services as an officer in the American Army in the Revolutionary War".

The 1850 U.S. Federal Census lists John Shreve as a resident of Goshen Township, Mahoning County, Ohio. Interestingly, the census lists John's next-door neighbor as Israel Shreve, who is his son.

== Final years ==
Democratic Transcript, October 11, 1854:

"He was a man of vigorous intellect and strong memory; he was benevolent to a fault, and often contributed to relieve the wants of others beyond what his own necessities would strictly justify. He was an ardent friend of freedom, strongly devoted to the principles of liberty, for which he had fought and bled under Washington. We have noticed concisely a few of the leading incidents in the life of one who served his country, both in peace and war, with a faithfulness that won the approbation as such men as Washington and Lafayette and the community in which he resided."

John was interred in Mount Union Cemetery, Alliance, Stark County, Ohio.

== See also ==
- Oliver Cromwell (American soldier)
- Benajah Osmun
- Henry Miller Shreve
- Israel Shreve
- Quakers in the American Revolution

== Sources ==
- A census of pensioners for revolutionary or military services;... Washington: Blair and Rives. 1941
- Allen, Luther Prentice (1901). The genealogy and history of the Shreve family from 1641. Greenfield, Ill: Privately Printed, 1901
- Cleveland Weekly Leader, Cleveland, Ohio
- Democratic Transcript, Stark County, Ohio
- Ellis, Franklin (1882). History of Fayette County, Pennsylvania: with biographical sketches of its pioneers and prominent men. Philadelphia: L. H. Everts & Co.
- Encyclopedia of American Quaker Genealogy [EAQG], Volume I–VI
- French, Howard Barclay (1909). Genealogy of the descendants of Thomas French. Philadelphia: Privately Printed, 1909
- Hise, Daniel Howell. The Hise journals : a diary of the life of Daniel Howell Hise from the year 1846 to 1878; addendum diary by Edwin Hise from the year 1879 to 1883. New edition, 2001
- Mack, Horace (1879). History of Columbiana County, Ohio: with illustrations and biographical sketches of some of its prominent men and pioneers.
- Nelson, William, and Berthold Fernow (1899). Calendar of records in the office of the Secretary of State. 1614-1703. The Press Printing and Publishing Co.
- New Orleans Wharf Register
  A handwritten document (mostly in French) recording the date of arrival, name, type and fee for each boat in the port of New Orleans. Registration was suspended from December 16, 1814, until January 28, 1815.
  New Orleans Public Library, 219 Loyola Avenue, New Orleans, LA 70112-2044
  Call number: QN420 1806-1823, New Orleans (La.) Collector of Levee Dues. Registers of flatboats, barges, rafts, and steamboats in the port of New Orleans, 1806-1823.
- The Patriot, Harrisburg, Pennsylvania
- Shepherd, Henry Elliot (1900). "Nelson's biographical dictionary and historical reference book of Fayette County, Pennsylvania, Volume 2." Uniontown, Pennsylvania: S. B. Nelson (publisher). 1225 pages, pp. 15–16
- Shreve, John (1853). "Washington's Slave". Anti-Slavery Bugle, October 1, 1853, p. 1, Salem, Columbiana County, Ohio
- Shreve, John (1879). "Personal Narrative of the Services of Lieut. John Shreve of the New Jersey Line of the Continental Army". The magazine of American history with notes and queries, Vol. 3, (September 1879), pp. 564–579, New York and Chicago: A.S. Barnes & Co.
- Stryker, William S. (compiler) (1872). Official Register of the Officers and Men of New Jersey in the Revolutionary War, Compiled under Orders of His Excellency Theodore F. Randolph, Governor, by William S. Stryker, Adjutant General. With Added Digest and Revision for the use of the Society of the Cincinnati in the State of New Jersey (1911) Reviews and Compiled by James W. S. Campbell. [Original edition published in 1872.] Reprint edition Baltimore: Genealogical Publishing Co., 1967.
- The three towns: a sketch of Brownsville, Bridgeport and West Brownsville. (1993) 3rd edition, Brownsville, Pennsylvania: Tru Copy Printing
- Thompson, William Y. (1979). Israel Shreve: Revolutionary War officer. Ruston, Louisiana: McGinty Trust Fund Publications
- Woodward, E. M. (1883), History of Burlington County, New Jersey, with biographical sketches of many of its pioneers and prominent men. Philadelphia: Everts & Peck
