= Shreve =

Shreve can refer to:

== People ==
- Anita Shreve (1946–2018), author
- Benjamin Shreve (1908–1985), American herpetologist
- Billy Shreve (born 1967), member of the Council of Frederick County, Maryland
- Bob Shreve (1912–1990), broadcasting pioneer
- Chasen Shreve (born 1990), American baseball player
- Forrest Shreve (1878–1950), American botanist
- Henry Miller Shreve (1785–1851), American inventor and steamboat captain
- Israel Shreve (1739–1799), colonel during the American Revolutionary War
- Jack Shreve (1932–2018), American politician
- Jeff Shreve (born 1965), American sports announcer
- John Shreve (1762-1854), lieutenant during the American Revolutionary War
- Larry Shreve (born 1941), professional wrestler known as Abdullah the Butcher
- Milton William Shreve (1858–1939), US Congressman from Pennsylvania
- Peg Shreve (1927–2012), American politician
- Porter Shreve (born 1967), author, son of Susan Shreve
- R. Norris Shreve (1885-1975), chemical engineer and academic at Purdue University
- Richmond Shreve (1877–1946), Canadian-American architect
- Steven E. Shreve, American mathematician
- Susan Shreve (born 1939), novelist, mother of Porter Shreve
- Thomas Shreve (1755–1816), Canadian clergyman

== Places ==
- Shreve, Alabama
- Shreve, Ohio

== See also ==
- Shreve, Crump & Low, commonly called "Shreve's", a Boston luxury goods retailer
- Shreve's least gecko, a Haitian lizard named for Benjamin Shreve
