= Benajah Osmun =

Society of the Cincinnati (d. 1815)

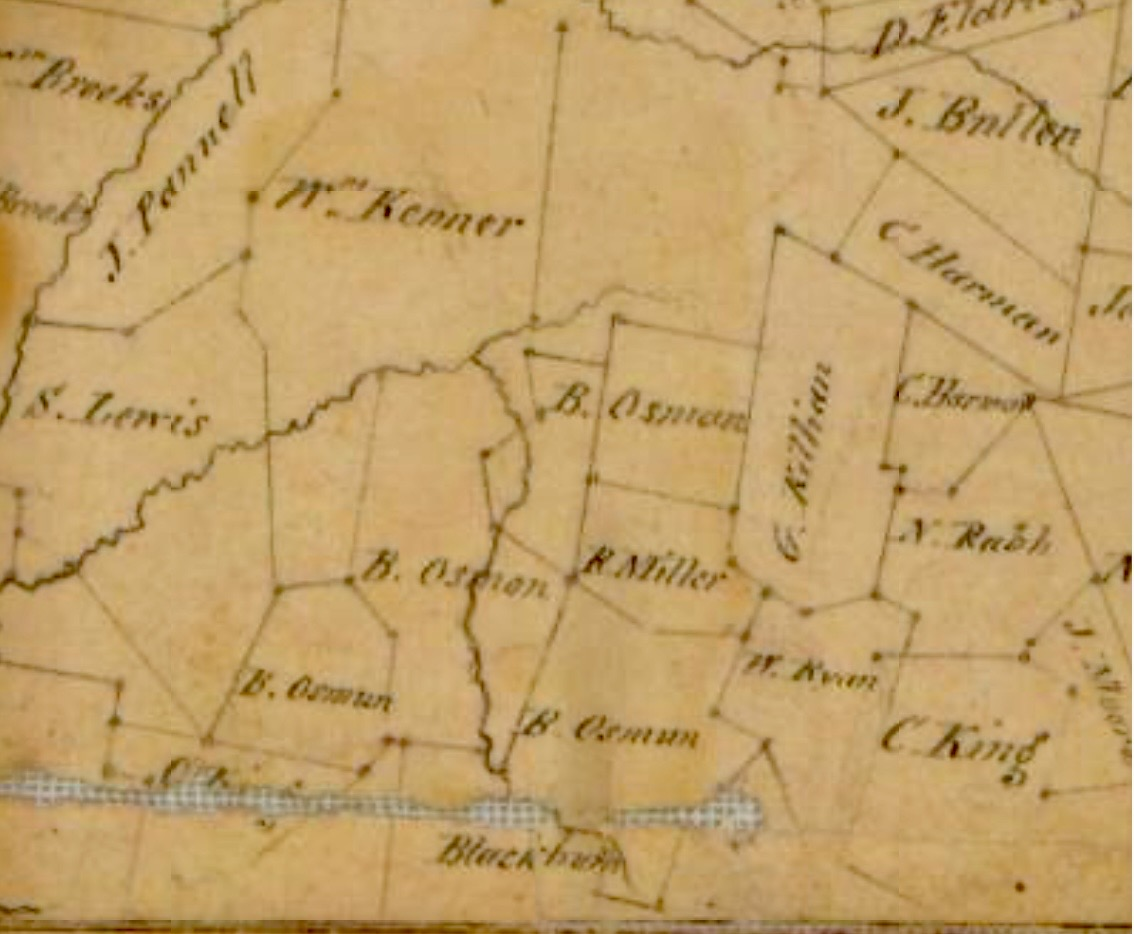
- Benajah Osmun property in the vicinity of Seth Lewis and William Kenner, Adams County, Mississippi Territory, 1810
- Died: 1815; Mississippi

Benajah Osmun (died in June 1815, Natchez, Adams County, Mississippi) was an original member of the Society of the Cincinnati. (Note: After his death, his grandnephew, William Case Osmun (1822-1902), was admitted to the membership of the Society on July 4, 1887.) During the Revolutionary War he made Captain and was taken prisoner at Charleston. In politics he was a federalist and a strong partisan of John Adams.

== Military service ==
Originally from Hunterdon County, New Jersey, during the Revolutionary War, Benajah Osmun fought at the Battle of Quebec on December 31, 1775, led by General Richard Montgomery. He fought at the Battle of Long Island on August 27, 1776, and he was taken prisoner there. Osmun served as 2nd Lieutenant and Quartermaster in the 2nd Battalion, 2nd New Jersey Regiment under Colonel Israel Shreve beginning on January 1, 1777. It was to Osmun that Colonel Shreve was asked to escort his family back to the Shreve family homestead at Mount Pleasant, in Mansfield Township, Burlington County, New Jersey. After resigning from the previous post, Osmun was made again 2nd Lieutenant on September 12, 1778, and was taken prisoner at Charleston on April 25, 1780. He was made Lieutenant on January 1, 1781 and Captain by brevet. He served until the close of the war.

He was made Lieutenant-Colonel in 1782 in the Adams County militia. He served as a major for the cavalry of the government of the Mississippi Territory in 1798. As Lieutenant Colonel he was present at the court-martial of Mississippi militia Maj. John F. Carmichael in 1806.

== Personal life ==
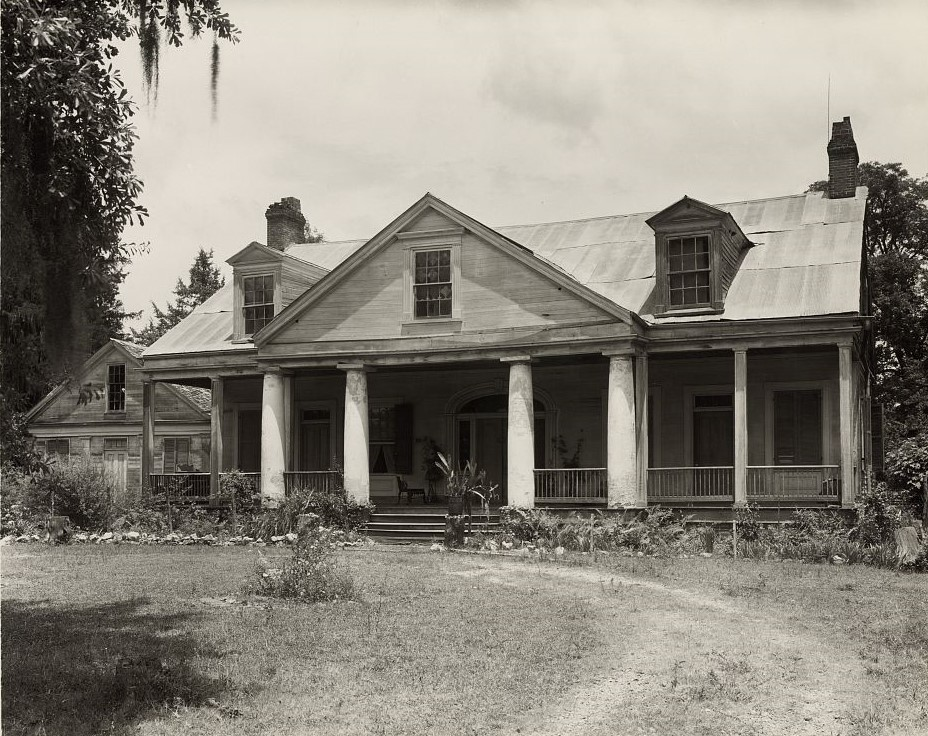
Windy Hill Manor, by Frances Benjamin Johnston, 1938

In 1790, Osmun moved to Natchez, Mississippi, accompanying the Forman Family Colony that was founded by Ezekiel Forman, father of General Thomas Marsh Forman and brother of General David Forman. Prior to that, Osmun was the overseer of the plantation of General David Forman.

Osmun built and lived at Windy Hill Manor at the foot of Half Way Hill near Natchez, Mississippi. He was a good friend of Adam Cloud, an Episcopal minister who settled in Natchez and fought for religious freedom. When Aaron Burr went under trial in 1807 on a charge of treason, Osmun was one of his bondsmen. (Note: Later, Burr visited Osman at Windy Hill and while staying there courted a neighbor's daughter, Madeline Price. Before they could marry, Burr was forced to leave. He asked Madeline to go with him. She refused and in the end, she married a merchant from Havana, Cuba.) With Lyman Harding, they paid $10,000 for the bond.

== Death ==
Benajah Osmun died in June 1815, in Natchez, Mississippi, unmarried, and was buried on the plantation. (Note: In 1817, Windy Hill Manor was sold to future governor Gerard Brandon.) In his will, dated May 17, 1815, Osmun requested that his slave Jerry was to be emancipated and freed from slavery.

== See also ==
- Isaac Guion
- William Gordon Forman
