= Mansfield Public Schools =

School district in Burlington County, New Jersey, US

Address
- 200 Mansfield Road East Mansfield Township, Burlington County, New Jersey, 08022; United States
- Coordinates: 40.08757°N 74.691365°W

District information
- Grades: K-6
- Superintendent: Tiffany J. Moutis
- Business administrator: Danielle Dolci
- Schools: 2

Students and staff
- Enrollment: 514 (as of 2021–22)
- Faculty: 56.4 FTEs
- Student–teacher ratio: 9.1:1

Other information
- District Factor Group: DE
- Website: www.mansfieldschool.com
Ind.	Per pupil	District spending	Rank (*)	K-6 average	%± vs. average
1A	Total Spending	$16,023	14	$18,891	−15.2%
1	Budgetary Cost	13,061	16	13,649	−4.3%
2	Classroom Instruction	7,955	16	8,366	−4.9%
6	Support Services	2,368	33	2,161	9.6%
8	Administrative Cost	1,456	23	1,467	−0.7%
10	Operations & Maintenance	1,279	14	1,552	−17.6%
16	Median Teacher Salary	59,629	36	57,437
Data from NJDoE 2014 Taxpayers' Guide to Education Spending. *Of K-6 districts with any number of students. Lowest spending=1; Highest=59

The Mansfield Public Schools is a comprehensive community public school district, serving students in kindergarten through sixth grade from Mansfield Township, in Burlington County, in the U.S. state of New Jersey.

As of the 2021–22 school year, the district, comprising two schools, had an enrollment of 514 students and 56.4 classroom teachers (on an FTE basis), for a student–teacher ratio of 9.1:1.

The district had been classified by the New Jersey Department of Education as being in District Factor Group "DE", the fifth-highest of eight groupings. District Factor Groups organize districts statewide to allow comparison by common socioeconomic characteristics of the local districts. From lowest socioeconomic status to highest, the categories are A, B, CD, DE, FG, GH, I and J.

Children in public school for seventh through twelfth grades attend the schools of the Northern Burlington County Regional School District, which also serves students from Chesterfield Township, North Hanover Township and Springfield Township, along with children of military personnel based at Joint Base McGuire–Dix–Lakehurst. The schools in the district (with 2021–22 enrollment data from the National Center for Education Statistics) are Northern Burlington County Regional Middle School with 723 students in grades 7-8 and Northern Burlington County Regional High School with 1,441 students in grades 9-12. Both schools are in the Columbus section of Mansfield Township. Using a formula that reflects the population and the value of the assessed property in each of the constituent municipalities, taxpayers in Mansfield Township pay 46.5% of the district's tax levy, with the district's 2013-14 budget including $35.6 million in spending.

== Schools ==
Schools in the district (with 2021–22 enrollment data from the National Center for Education Statistics) are:

- John Hydock Elementary School with 232 students in grades K-2
  - Stacy Cullari, principal
- Mansfield Township Elementary School with 279 students in grades 3-6
  - Glenn Kershner, principal

== Administration ==
Core members of the district's administration are:

- Tiffany J. Moutis, superintendent
- Danielle Dolci, business administrator and board secretary

== Board of education ==
The district's board of education is comprised of nine members who set policy and oversee the fiscal and educational operation of the district through its administration. As a Type II school district, the board's trustees are elected directly by voters to serve three-year terms of office on a staggered basis, with three seats up for election each year held (since 2012) as part of the November general election. The board appoints a superintendent to oversee the district's day-to-day operations and a business administrator to supervise the business functions of the district.
