= Osmun =

Osmun is a surname. Notable people with the surname include:

- Benajah Osmun (d. 1815), American serviceman and original member of the Society of the Cincinnati
- Billy Osmun (born 1943), American racing driver
- Leighton Osmun (1880–1928), American screenwriter, playwright, and author
