= Oliver Cromwell (American soldier) =

American soldier (1752–1853)

- Born: May 24, 1752; Black Horse, Province of New Jersey, British America (now Columbus, New Jersey
- Died: January 1853 (aged 100); Burlington, New Jersey, US
- Military career
- Allegiance: United States
- Branch: Continental Army
- Service years: 1777–1783
- Rank: Private
- Unit: 2nd New Jersey Regiment
- Battles: Trenton; Princeton; Short Hills; Brandywine; Monmouth; Yorktown
- Awards: Badge of Military Merit

Oliver Cromwell (May 24, 1752 – January 1853) was an African-American soldier, who served in the American Revolutionary War. He was born a free black man in Black Horse (now the Columbus section of Mansfield Township, Burlington County, New Jersey), on the farm of tavernkeeper John Hutchin and was raised as a farmer.

== War service ==
Private Cromwell served in several companies of the 2nd New Jersey Regiment between 1777 and 1783, seeing action at the battles of Trenton (1776), Princeton (1777), Short Hills (1777), Brandywine (1777), Monmouth (1778), and at the final siege of Yorktown (1781).

After Yorktown, Cromwell left the army. Commander-in-Chief George Washington personally signed Cromwell's discharge papers and also awarded him with the Badge of Merit.

Some years after retirement, Cromwell applied for a veteran's pension. Although he was unable to read or write, local lawyers, judges, and politicians came to his aid, and he was granted a pension of $96 a year. He purchased a 100-acre farm outside Burlington, fathered 15 children, then spent his later years at his home at 114 East Union Street in Burlington.

== Death ==
Cromwell died in January 1853. He left behind several children, grandchildren, and great-grandchildren, but there was no one to raise a marker over the grave of the private. He lived to be 100 years old, outliving 14 of his children and 1 of his grandchildren, and is buried in the cemetery of the Broad Street Methodist Church. His descendants live in the city to this day. On May 4, 2022, the Daughters of the American Revolution unveiled a plaque on his home honoring his service.

== Legacy ==
It is possible that Cromwell is depicted in the famous Washington Crossing the Delaware portrait, although this is unlikely.
