= Mount Pleasant, Burlington County, New Jersey =

Historic place in Burlington County, New Jersey, US

Mount Pleasant
- Unincorporated community
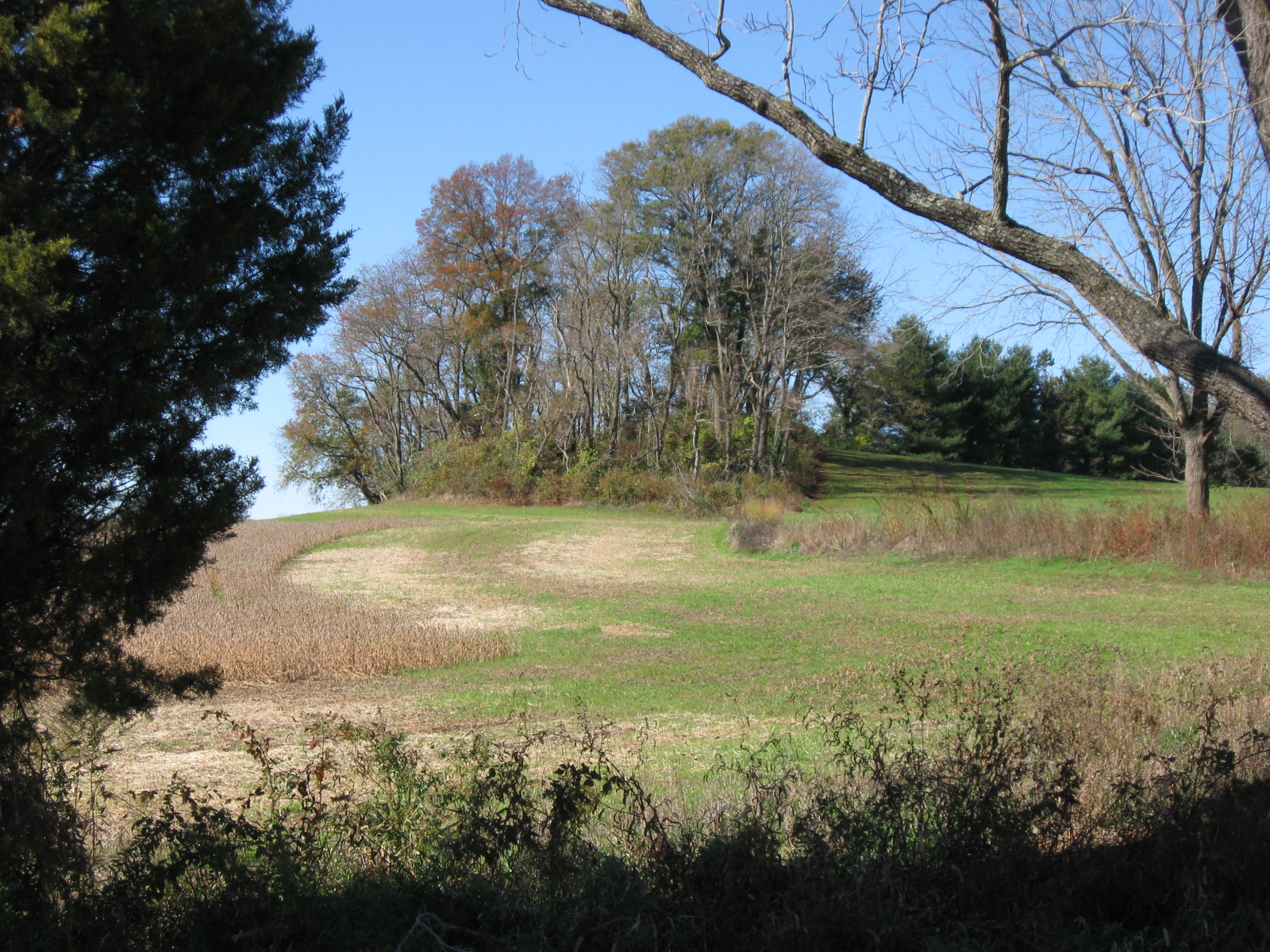
- Mount Pleasant hill, c. 2010
- Interactive map of Mount Pleasant
- Country: United States
- State: New Jersey
- County: Burlington
- Townships: Mansfield and the northeastern range of Springfield

Mount Pleasant is a historic place located within the southeastern range of Mansfield Township and the northeastern range of Springfield Township. Mount Pleasant encompasses the intersection of Mount Pleasant Road (running east–west) and Gaunt's Bridge Road (running north–south), . The intersection is located about 3 miles (4.8 km) east of Columbus and 1 mile (1.6 km) south of Georgetown.

Mount Pleasant was named for the area's most conspicuous landmark: a small hill tapering to a pointed peak. Mount Pleasant hill is wooded and it is located in a cultivated farm field in the southwest quadrant of the aforementioned intersection. A low, wooded ridge runs for about 1 mile (1.6 km) from the west side of the hill along the south side of Mount Pleasant Road toward Skunk Island Road. South of the ridge and Mount Pleasant Road lies an expansive meadowland that encompasses Assiscunk Creek, the township's southern border. The meadowland was called Ye Great Meadow during the 17th and 18th centuries. North of the ridge and Mount Pleasant Road lie cultivated farm fields that encompass Crafts Creek.

== Early history ==
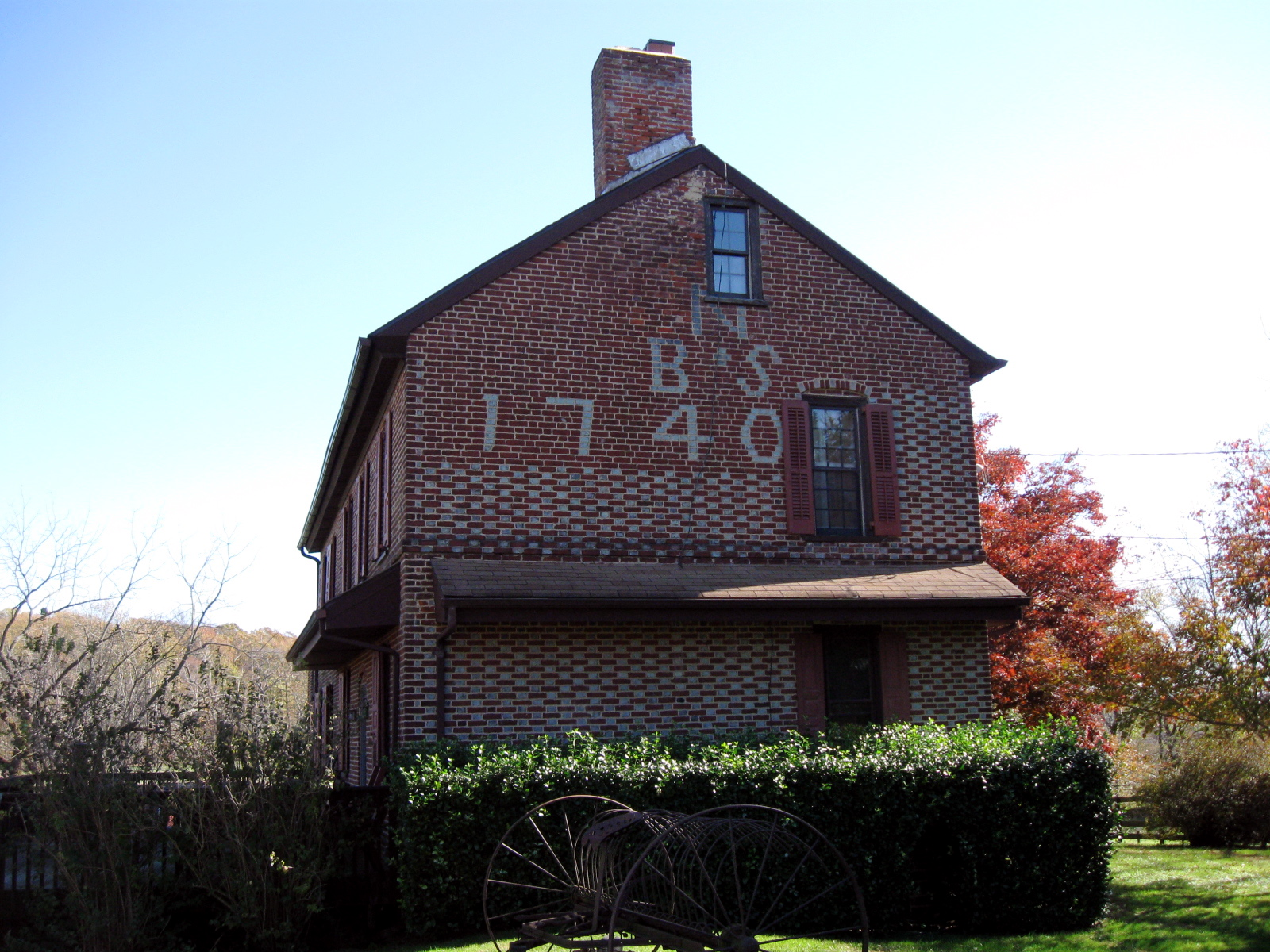
Barzillai and Sarah Newbold House, c. 2010

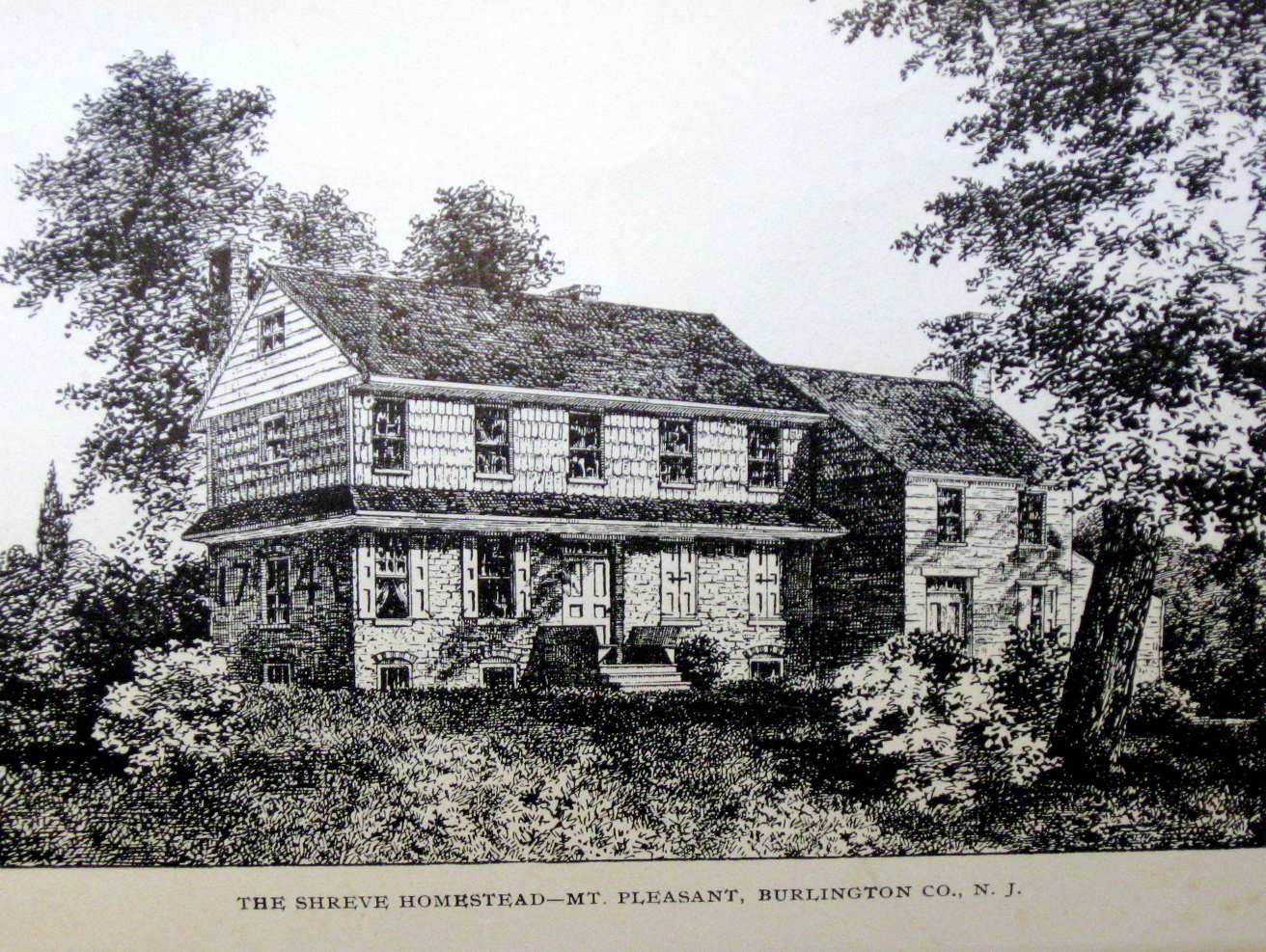
The Shreve Homestead- Mt. Pleasant, Burlington Co., N. J.

Mount Pleasant was settled by Quakers during the latter part of the 17th century. In 1688, Mansfield Township was established and its borders were published:

"The Constabulary of Mansfield to lye on ye south side of William Black's Creek, down Delaware River to the town bounds of Burlington, and soe up Birch Creek to John Pancoast's, to Michael Newbold's, and soe ye north of ye Great Meadow to Eliakim Higgins' plantation."

In 1693, Richard French purchased 460 acres (190 ha) of land at Mount Pleasant from the estate of William Ellis.

In 1699, from the 460-acre tract, Richard and Sarah (Scattergood) French sold 325 acres (132 ha), including Mount Pleasant hill, to Caleb and Sarah (Areson) Shreve. In 1725, a small house was built to the west of the hill for Caleb and Sarah. In 1742, after the demise of the Shreves, their son Benjamin inherited the Mount Pleasant property where a larger house was constructed of brick next to its predecessor. Benjamin, and his wife, the former Rebecca French, made the property their homestead. Rebecca was the daughter of Richard French, the previous owner of the land. This property, also named Mount Pleasant, was the homestead of the Shreve family for many years. It was the childhood home of Israel Shreve, a distinguished colonel during the Revolutionary War, and may be viewed via the Internet link shown below.

The Barzillai and Sarah Newbold House was constructed in 1740 and is located in the northeast quadrant of the intersection. The house is listed on the National Register of Historic Places listings in Burlington County, New Jersey and may be viewed via the Internet link shown below.

== Early residents and landowners ==
- John Curtis and Anne, his wife, lived at Ogston, their 347-acre farm located on a ridge west of Mount Pleasant hill.
  - Thomas Curtis, John and Anne's son, inherited Ogston.
  - Thomas Curtis, John's brother, owned 150 acres bordering the south branch of Assiscunk Creek.
- William Ellis, prior to November 18, 1693, owned a 460-acre tract at Mount Pleasant that encompassed the area's most conspicuous landmark and namesake.
- Richard French purchased from the estate of William Ellis, on November 18, 1693, the same 460-acre tract at Mount Pleasant.
- Caleb and Sarah (Areson) Shreve purchased from Richard and Sarah (Scattergood) French, on April 22, 1699, 325 acres that encompassed Mount Pleasant hill.
  - In 1725, a Shreve family homestead was built next to the hill for Caleb and Sarah Shreve.
  - In 1742, the next Shreve family homestead was built and this time it was for Benjamin and Rebecca (French) Shreve. It was larger than its predecessor and sat a little closer to Mount Pleasant hill. Benjamin is the son of Caleb and Sarah Shreve, while Rebecca is the daughter of Richard and Mary French.
- John Butcher
- John Pancoast, (Pancas)
- Joseph Pancoast, (Pancas)
- Eliakim Higgins
- Michael Newbold
- John Woolston
- Thomas Folke, (ffolke)
- Thomas Revell, (Revel)
- George Guest
- Samuel Willis
- Edmund Wells
- Godfrey Hancock
- Elizabeth Woolman, aunt of John Woolman
  - Nathaniel Paine, first husband of Elizabeth Woolman
  - Robert Hunt, second husband of Elizabeth Woolman
  - John Harvey, third husband of Elizabeth Woolman
- Isaac Gibbs
- James Antrum, (Antrim)
- Isaac Antrum, (Antrim)
- Thomas Barton, In 1685, James Antram of 250 acres in the First Tenth, E. Percifall Towle, adjoining Thomas Barton, Thomas Scattergood, and Nathaniel Richards, including two acres of meadow at Mount Pleasant next to John Curtis. "Patents and Deeds and Other Early Records of New Jersey 1664-1703”
- Michael Buffin
- Barzilla and Sarah Newbold

== Gallery ==
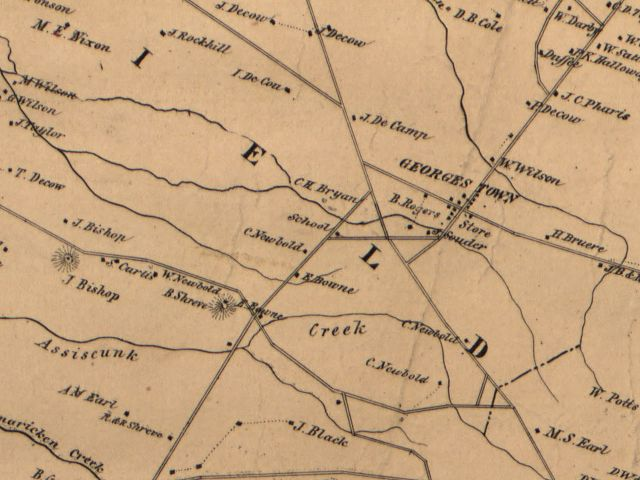
Mount Pleasant area, ca. 1859

== Bibliography ==
- Allen, Luther Prentice (1901). Genealogy and history of the Shreve family from 1641. Greenfield, Illinois: Privately printed. 672 pages.
- Biddle, C. Miller (2012). William and Sarah Biddle, 1633-1711, planting a seed of democracy in America. Moorestown, New Jersey: Privately printed. 399 pages.
- French, Howard Barclay (1909). Genealogy of the descendants of Thomas French. Philadelphia: Privately printed. pp. 224, 230.
- Nelson, William, and Berthold Fernow (1899). Calendar of records in the office of the Secretary of State. 1614-1703. The Press Printing and Publishing Co.
- New Jersey Colonial Records, vol. 21, 1664-1703
- Tusim, Pearl J. (1976). History of Mansfield Township, 1688-1976. Privately printed. 150 pages.
- Tusim, Pearl J. (1976). Record book of Mansfield township, 1697-1773, Book 3. Privately printed. 116 pages.
- Woodward, E. M. (1883). History of Burlington County, New Jersey, with biographical sketches of many of its pioneers and prominent men. Philadelphia: Everts & Peck.
