= Henry Miller Shreve =

American businessman (1785-1851)

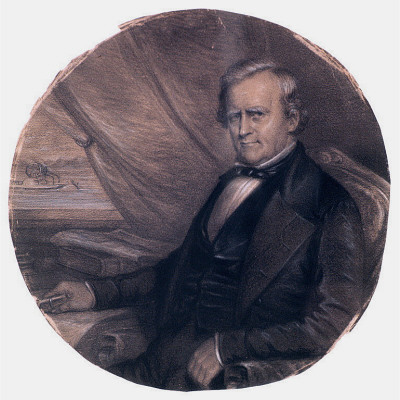
- Captain Henry Miller Shreve
- Born: October 21, 1785; Mount Pleasant, New Jersey, U.S.
- Died: March 6, 1851 (aged 65); St. Louis, Missouri, U.S.
- Education: Home schooled
- Spouses: Mary Blair; Lydia Rogers
- Children: Harriet Louise (b. 1811); Rebecca Ann (b. 1813); Hampden Zane (b. 1815); Mary
- Parent(s): Israel Shreve; Mary Cokely
- Engineering career
- Projects: Cleared the Great Raft
- Significant design: Steamboat Washington; Steamboat Heliopolis

Henry Miller Shreve (October 21, 1785 – March 6, 1851) was an American inventor and steamboat captain who removed obstructions to navigation of the Mississippi, Ohio and Red rivers. Shreveport, Louisiana, was named in his honor.

Shreve was also instrumental in breaking the Fulton-Livingston monopoly on steamboat traffic on the lower Mississippi. He was the first riverboat captain to travel the Ohio and Mississippi rivers to New Orleans and back, as well as the first to bring a keelboat from the Ohio River up the Mississippi to the Fever River in Illinois. Shreve also made significant improvements to the steamboat and the steam engine, such as separate boilers to power side paddlewheels independently, horizontal cylinders, and multiple decks to allow for passengers and entertainment.

== Early life ==
Shreve was born October 21, 1785, to Israel Shreve, a Quaker farmer who had served as a colonel in the American Revolution, and the former Mary Cokely at Mount Pleasant (Burlington County, New Jersey), the family homestead near Columbus, New Jersey, in Mansfield Township, Burlington County, New Jersey. On July 7, 1788, the Shreves left New Jersey for their new home on property owned by George Washington in Fayette County, Pennsylvania.

Young Henry's new home was close to the Youghiogheny River near the present day borough of Perryopolis. After his father's death in 1799, Shreve served on several riverboats to help support his family.

== Career ==
In 1807, Shreve was a captain and built a barge of 35 tons, at Brownsville, Pennsylvania, on the Monongahela River. He manned it with a crew of ten men for a voyage to St. Louis, which he reached in December of that year. After purchasing a cargo of furs, he returned to Pittsburgh and forwarded them to Philadelphia. He continued this trade for three years with considerable profit, as each voyage was on his own account.

In 1810, Shreve decided to open a new line of business, lead trade. On May 2, he left in a new barge of 35 tons manned by 12 men and made the trip from St. Louis to where Galena, Illinois was later built, in 14 days. He remained until July 1 busily employed in traffic with the natives, buying 60 tons of lead. He was therefore compelled to build a flat boat, and buy a Mackinaw boat, to transport his return cargo. His flotilla reached St Louis in 12 days, the beginning of the American lead trade on the Upper Mississippi. He took his cargo to New Orleans and then shipped it to Philadelphia, earning upwards of $11,000. In 1847 that trade equalled in value about $3,000,000 annually, estimating only the shipments from Fever River. In 1810, there were less than 10 small settlements between Louisville and the mouth of the Ohio River and about the same number between the latter and Vicksburg. Shreve never repeated the trip to Galena, as his success induced others to send 6 barges to Galena. Upon his return to Brownsville that year he built a barge of 95 ton capacity, and began regular voyages between Pittsburgh and New Orleans for the next 4 years.

For example, on February 11, 1814, Shreve's barge was registered at New Orleans . After loading his boat with cargo, Shreve and crew hauled and poled the vessel 2,200 miles (3,500 km) against strong river currents, probably reaching Brownsville before July 1814.

=== Commanding the Enterprise, December 1814 – January 1815 ===
A group of Brownsville investors had formed a stock company, the Monongahela and Ohio Steam Boat Company, to conduct steamboat commerce on the Western rivers. To this end, the company commissioned a new steamboat to be constructed at Brownsville. During the winter and spring of 1814, while Shreve was on the voyage to New Orleans, the Enterprise, with an engine and power train designed and built by Daniel French, was constructed. Between June and December 1814, the Enterprise, under the command of Israel Gregg, made two successful voyages transporting passengers and cargo to ports between Brownsville and Louisville, Kentucky. By December, the company had decided to send the Enterprise to New Orleans with a cargo of munitions for General Andrew Jackson's troops to defend the city against an invasion by British forces.

Command of the Enterprise was transferred to Henry Shreve because of his firsthand knowledge of the hazards to navigation of the Ohio and Mississippi Rivers. On December 21, 1814, the Enterprise departed Pittsburgh with the munitions, passed the Falls at Louisville on December 28, 1814 and arrived at New Orleans on January 9, 1815, one day after the Battle of New Orleans.

After the American victory on the January 8, 1815, Battle of New Orleans, a lawsuit was brought by the heirs of Robert Fulton and Robert Livingston against Shreve and the owners of the Enterprise for violating the formers' monopoly against any unauthorized navigation of Louisiana waters by steamboat.

In May 1815, soon after being released from jail, Shreve commanded the Enterprise from New Orleans to Louisville, the first time a northbound steamboat was able to reach that city. Then he navigated the Enterprise to Pittsburgh and finally to her homeport of Brownsville. This long and difficult voyage by the Enterprise, more than 2,200 miles (3,500 km) against the currents of the Mississippi and Ohio Rivers, demonstrated the ability of steamboats to navigate the western rivers.

=== The Washington, 1816 ===
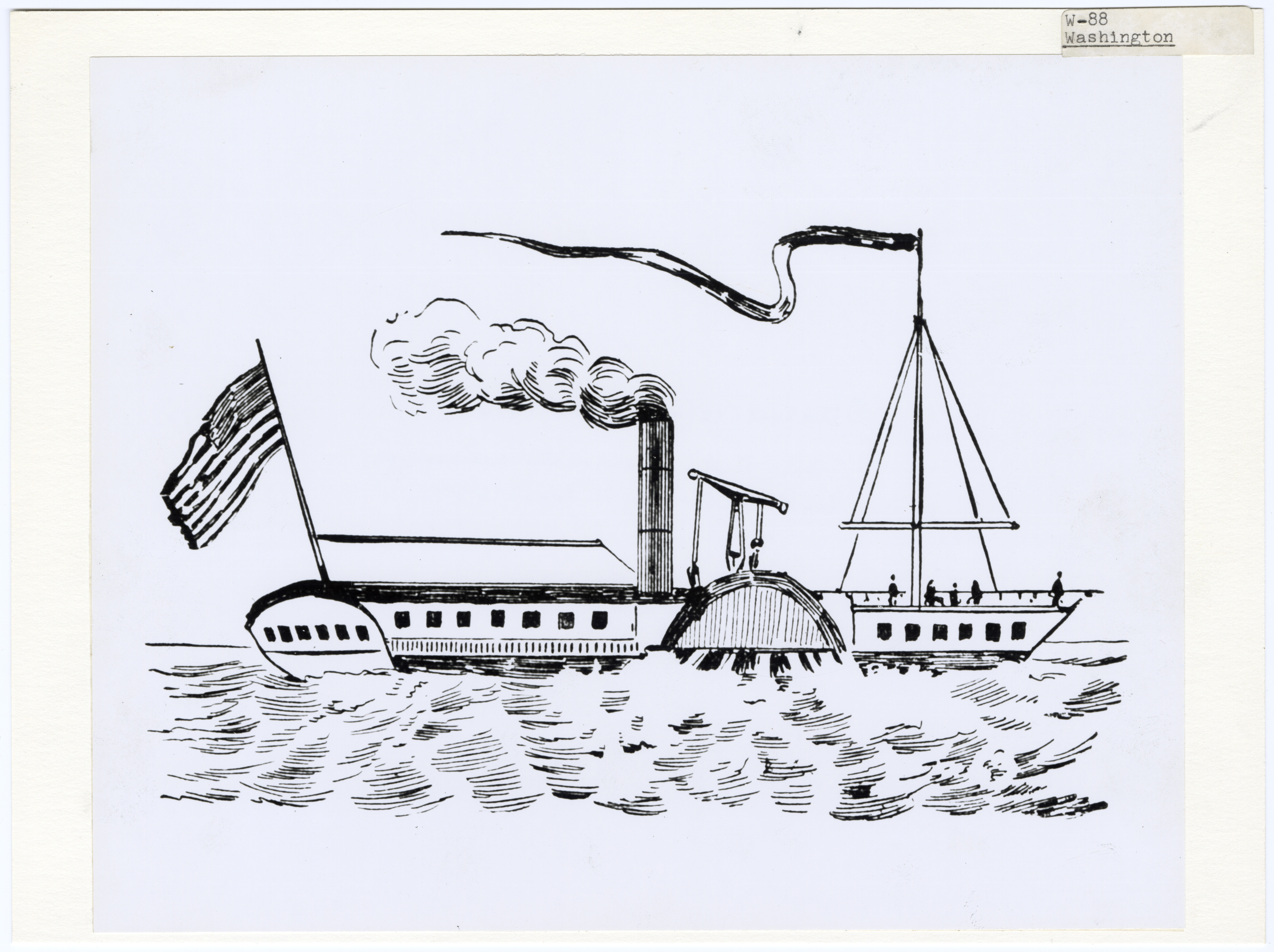
Wood engraving of steamer Washington

Shreve and four partners commissioned George White to build a new steamboat, named the Washington, at Wheeling, Virginia (later West Virginia). The engine and drive train of the Washington were built by Daniel French at Brownsville. and it was first launched in 1816. It was the first steamboat with two decks, the predecessor of the showboats of later years. The main deck was used for the boiler, and the upper deck was reserved for passengers..

Shreve, for the second time, piloted a steamboat to New Orleans where he once again was sued by the heirs of the Fulton-Livingston monopoly. Shreve took the Washington from New Orleans to Louisville and returned to the Crescent City on March 12, 1817. Shreve and several counterparts were subjected to lawsuits initiated by the monopolists. On March 25, 1817, Shreve departed New Orleans and piloted the Washington upriver. He reached Louisville in twenty-five days, equal to the record set by the Enterprise nearly two years earlier.

On April 21, 1817 Judge Dominic C. Hall declared that the court did not have jurisdiction and hence dismissed all of the suits. This decision eliminated any enforcement of the Livingston-Fulton monopoly in Louisiana courts. Hall's decision and the Washington's recent voyage from New Orleans to Louisville heralded the forthcoming steamboat era on the western rivers..

=== Clearing the Great Raft, 1832–1839 ===
The American rivers were still difficult to navigate, however, because of the presence of dead wood called snags, sawyers, or log jams.

On December 1, 1826, Shreve was appointed "Superintendent of Western River Improvements" and charged with finding a solution to this problem. He had been working on a design for a "snagboat" since 1821, "and the first twin steam snag-boat, the Heliopolis, was commenced...and completed in August, 1829, upon the plans and specifications and under the supervision and direction of Captain Shreve." The Heliopolis had a steam-powered windlass used to pull large concentrations of dead wood from the water.

On the 25th August, 1829, Captain Shreve reported to the Engineer Department that he had made experiments in removing snags "at Plum Point (the most dangerous place on the Mississippi River)...with the steam snag-boat Heliopolis, and that he had succeeded beyond his most sanguine expectations."

As a result of the success of his design, Shreve was ordered in 1832 by Secretary of War Lewis Cass to clear the Great Raft, 150 miles (240 km) of dead wood on the Red River. Shreve successfully removed the Raft by 1839. The area of the Red River where the Raft was most concentrated is today his namesake city of Shreveport.

The subject was responsible for shortening the course of rivers by cutting channels through the river bends which had the unfortunate result of creating shallows at the entrances of the Atchafalaya, Red, and Ouachita rivers.

== Later life ==
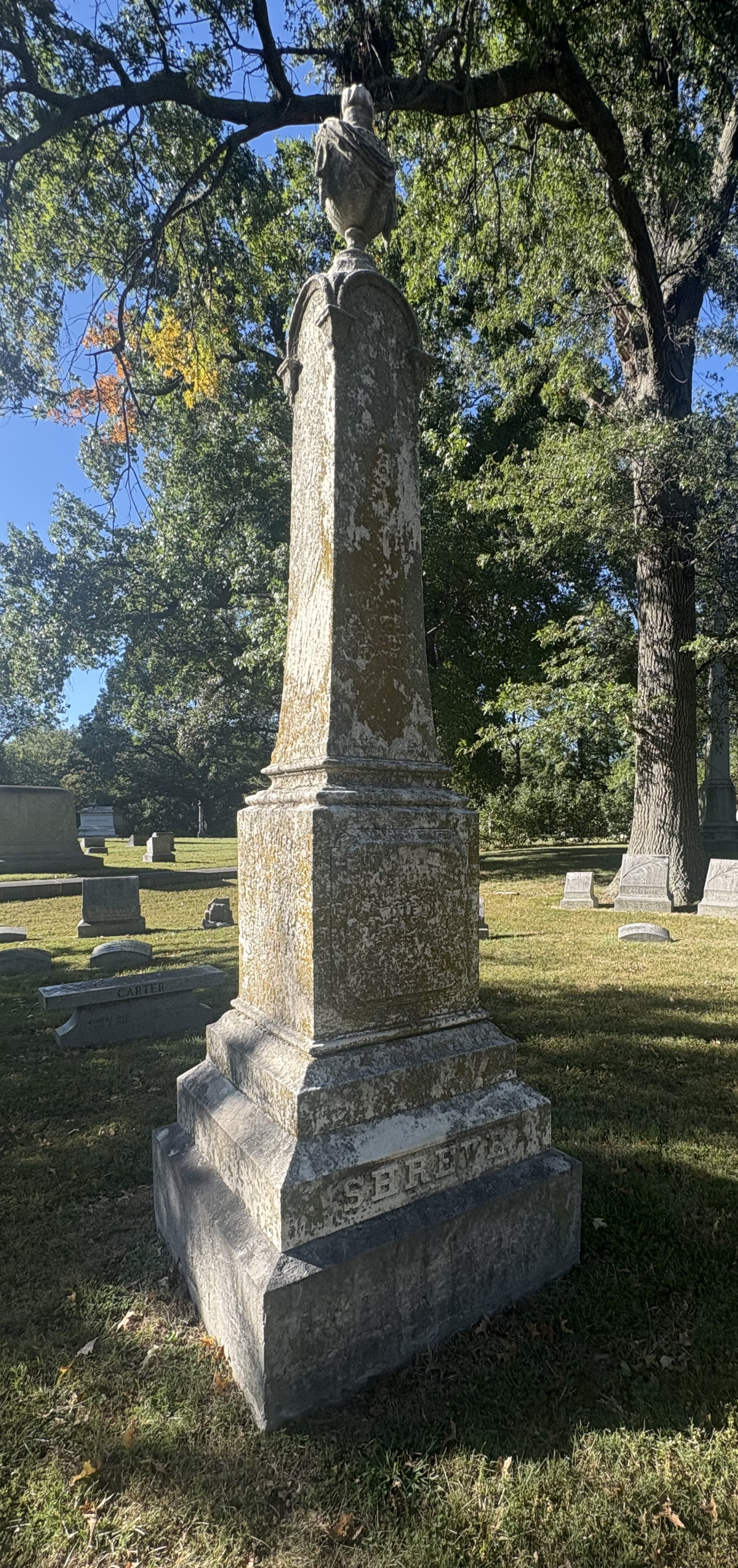
Shreve's grave at Bellefontaine Cemetery

Shreve was twice married. There were three children from his first marriage to the former Mary M. Blair on February 28, 1811, and two children from his union with the former Lydia Rogers of Boston. Shreve spent his final years with his daughter Rebecca's family in St. Louis. He died in the home of his son-in-law, Walker Randolph Carter, and is buried in Bellefontaine Cemetery in St. Louis.

== See also ==
- Mike Fink
- Monongahela and Ohio Steam Boat Company
