= Providence Quaker Cemetery and Chapel =

Historic site near Perryopolis, Fayette County, Pennsylvania, US

- U.S. National Register of Historic Places
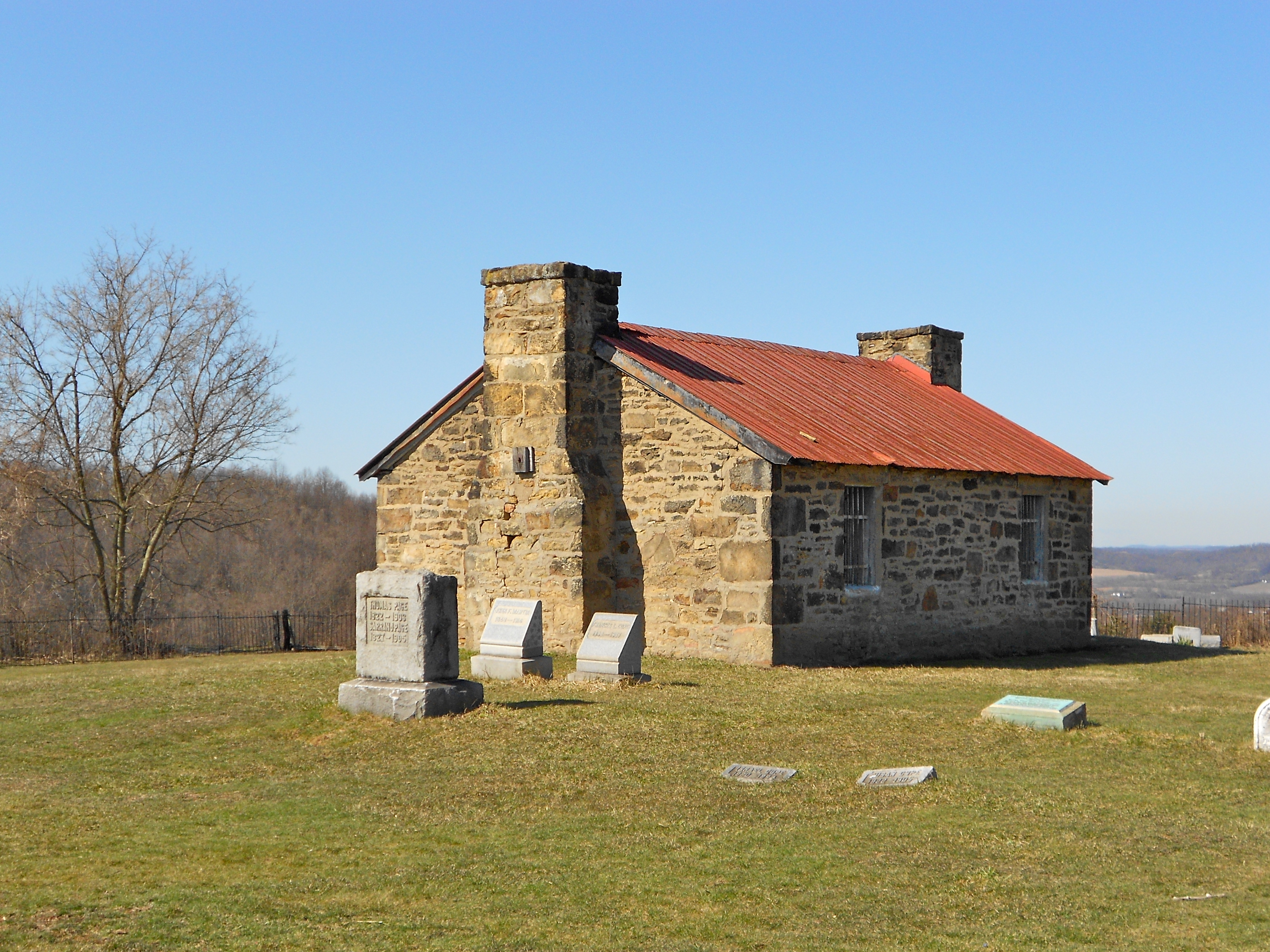
- View from the northeast

- Location within Pennsylvania Location within the United States
- Location: Jct. of PA 4038 and PA 4036 W, Perryopolis, Pennsylvania
- Coordinates: 40°4′23″N 79°46′56″W
- Built: c. 1790, 1895
- NRHP reference No.: 97001243
- Added to NRHP: October 24, 1997

Providence Quaker Cemetery and Chapel, also known as Providence Meeting House, is a historic chapel and cemetery located on Quaker Church Road about 2 miles southwest of Perryopolis, Fayette County, Pennsylvania. The cemetery was used by Quakers, but the chapel is not a Quaker structure. Quakers generally refer to a structure built for worship as a meeting house, rather than as a chapel or church.

It was listed on the National Register of Historic Places in 1997.

== History ==
A meeting of the Religious Society of Friends was founded at the site in 1789, and served by a log meeting house until 1793 when a stone building was constructed. John Cope bought 15 acres for the use of the meeting in 1793.

There were many early Quaker settlers in this area of southwestern Pennsylvania with nine Quaker meetings founded within 15 miles of Brownsville, which is about 9 miles southwest of this site. Few of these early Quaker structures survive, but several cemeteries are intact.

The Quaker population in the area began to decline about 1830, caused by western migration, the "Great Separation" between Hicksite and Orthodox Quakers, and controversy surrounding Quakers during the abolition movement and the Civil War. Between 1850 and 1870 most Quaker meetings in the area were closed, with the Providence Meeting closed in 1870.

By 1895 the meeting house was a ruin standing in the middle of an active cemetery. Elma Cope Binns organized the rebuilding of the meeting house into a smaller chapel constructed from the stone of the original building. Fourteen acres of the meeting's land was sold, leaving one acre for the cemetery.

== Architecture ==
The chapel measures 20 feet by 30 feet. It is built in a simple vernacular style and the stone is roughly coursed. There is no steeple, but a fireplace and chimney were built at the east and west ends. The two windows on both the north and south sides are not glazed, but blocked by iron bars. No door is present in the doorway on the south side.

The cemetery contains approximately 500 burials. In the early Quaker tradition, most graves were unmarked. About 50 tombstones are currently standing. The graves generally date from approximately 1790 to 1870, when the meeting house closed, though modern tombstones date as late as 2003. An iron fence surrounds the cemetery, except for a 125-foot section of modern chain link fencing.

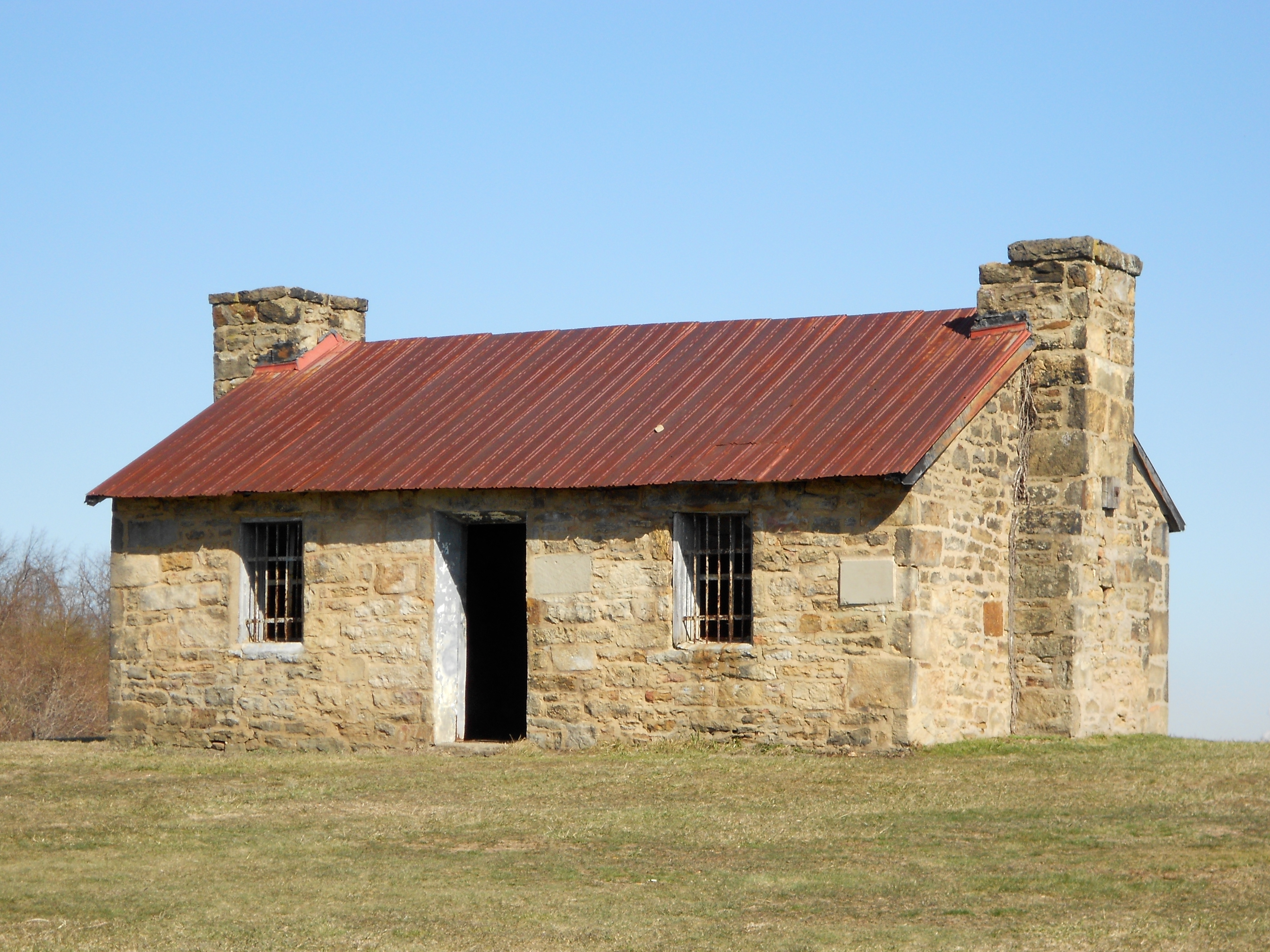
View from the south

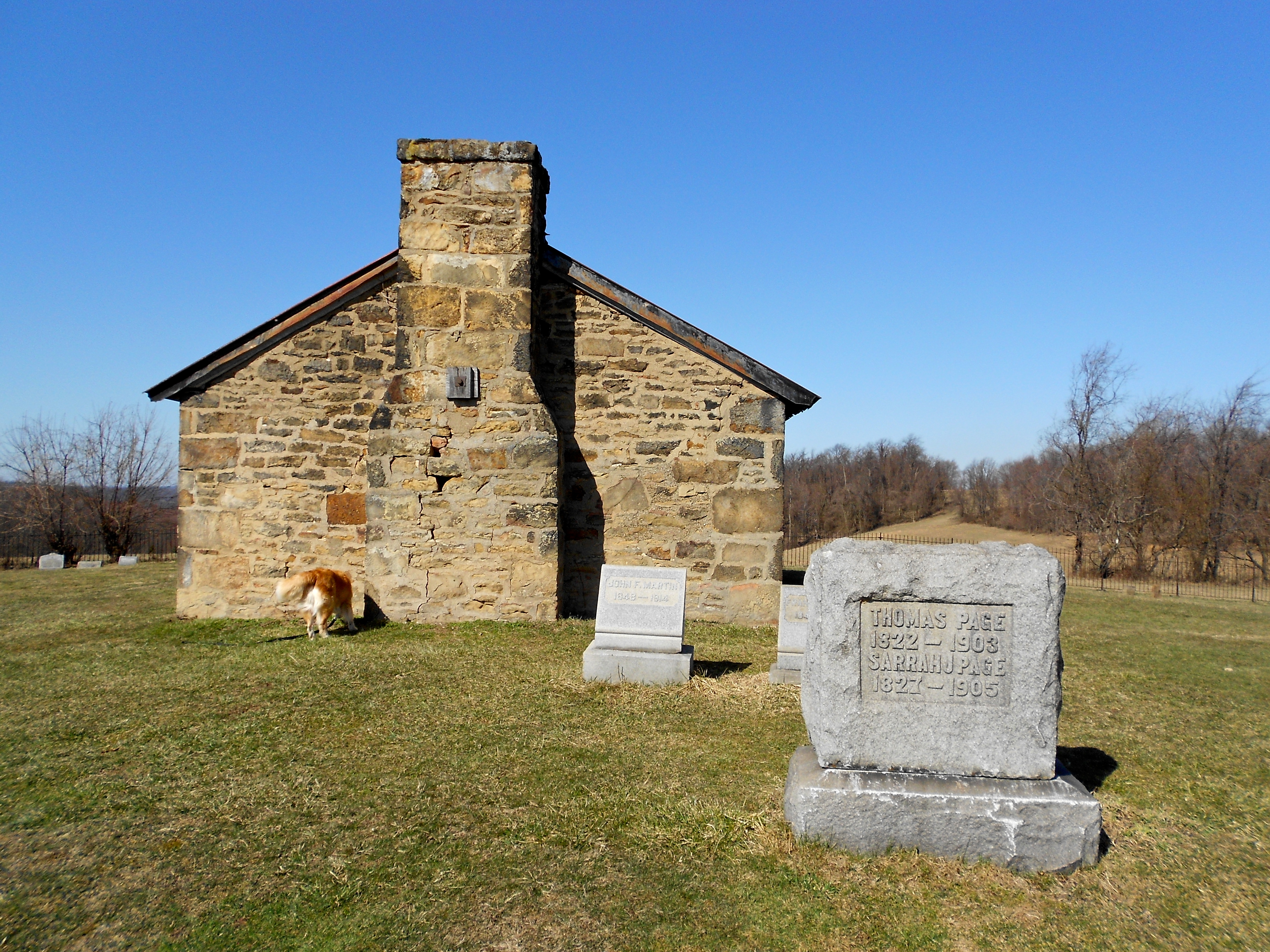
View from the east

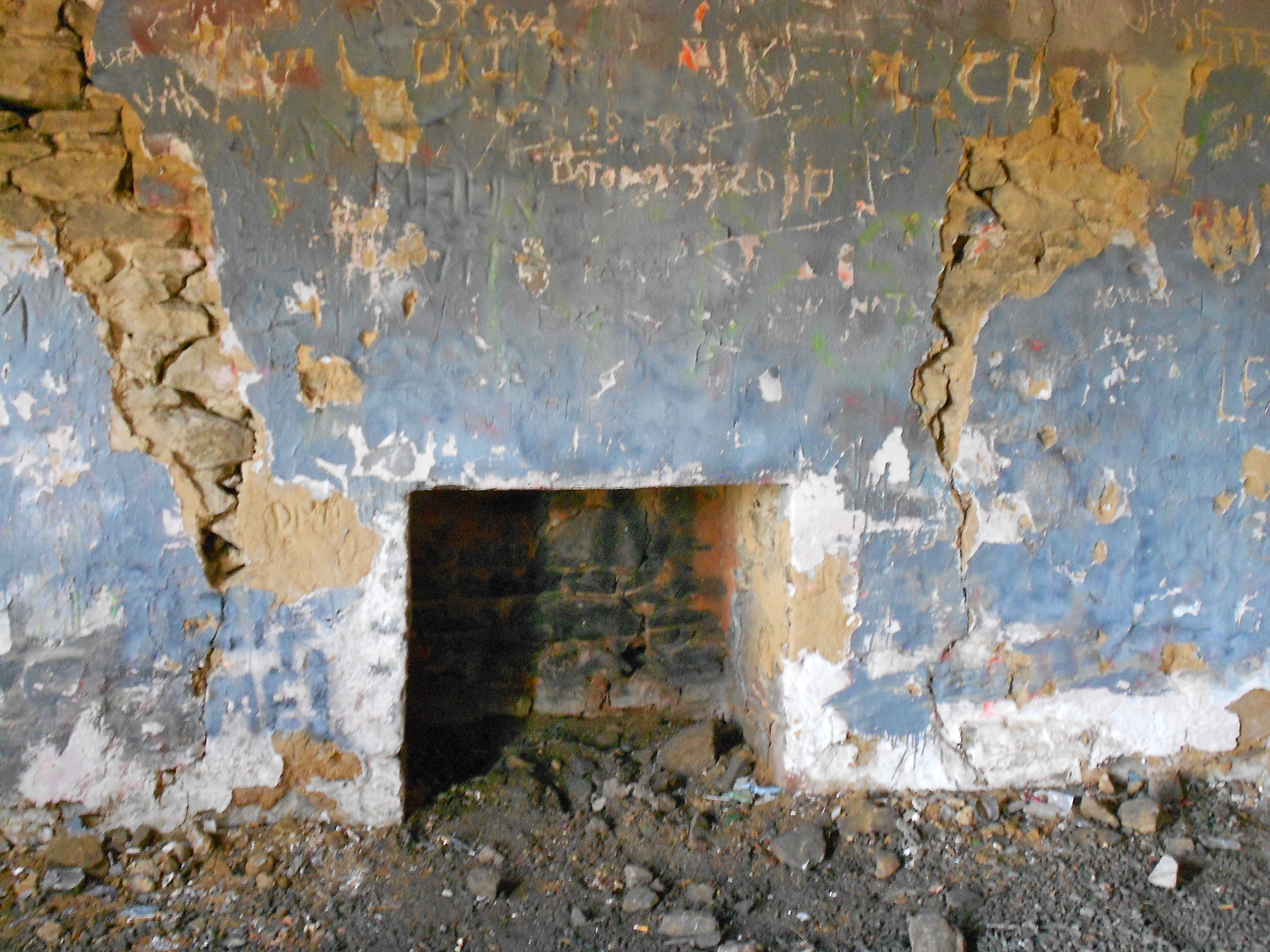
One of two fireplaces
