= Israel Shreve =

Colonel during the American Revolutionary War

- Born: December 24, 1739; Mount Pleasant, New Jersey, British America
- Died: December 14, 1799 (aged 59)
- Children: Henry Miller Shreve
- Military career
- Allegiance: Continental Army
- Rank: Colonel
- Conflicts: American Revolutionary War • Battle of Brandywine • Battle of Germantown • Battle of Springfield • Battle of Monmouth

Israel Shreve (December 24, 1739 – December 14, 1799) was a colonel in the 2nd New Jersey Regiment during the American Revolution. He fought at the Battle of Brandywine and at the Battle of Germantown and wintered at Valley Forge.

== Early life ==
Israel Shreve was born December 24, 1739, in the Shreve family homestead at Mount Pleasant in Mansfield Township, Burlington County, Province of New Jersey, an old community founded by Quakers. Shreve's father, Benjamin Shreve (the son of Caleb and Sarah (Areson) Shreve), and his mother, Rebecca French (the daughter of Richard and Mary (King) French), were married by Quaker ceremony in nearby Springfield Township on February 23, 1729. Israel was the fifth of their eight children.

Israel married Grace Curtis on February 27, 1760, at a Quaker meeting in Burlington County, New Jersey. After she died in 1771, Israel married Mary Cokely on May 10, 1773, in Philadelphia. Grace gave birth to four children, and Mary gave birth to seven more, including Henry Miller Shreve.

== Career ==
Israel worked and owned farmland and was appointed justice of the peace for Gloucester County, New Jersey, in February 1775.

=== American Revolutionary War ===
When the Battle of Bunker Hill occurred on June 17, 1775, Israel Shreve was a farmer and owner of a farm homestead near Georgetown, a village that is one mile north of the historic Shreve family homestead at Mount Pleasant. After news came of the Battles of Lexington and Concord, Israel and his brothers, Samuel and William, enlisted as officers in the New Jersey State militia.

On October 9, 1775, the 2nd New Jersey Regiment, or Jersey Line, was raised with Israel Shreve appointed Lieutenant colonel in the second battalion. After volunteering, John Shreve, Israel's thirteen-year-old son, also served in the second battalion. Three of Israel's brothers (Caleb, Samuel and William) and two of his nephews (Caleb's son, Benjamin and William's son, Richard) also enlisted as volunteers and served during the Revolutionary War. They were all members of the Society of Friends, a religious group that supported pacifism.

The 2nd New Jersey Regiment was sent north to relieve Benedict Arnold's attack on Quebec. The regiment arrived in Albany, New York by March 27, 1776, then reached Fort Ticonderoga by April 18. Shreve arrived in Quebec City May 3 under cannon fire from the British. When a British fleet appeared in the Saint Lawrence River, Shreve retreated west with 1,900 Americans. General John Thomas ordered Shreve to take some of the wounded to Sorel, at the juncture of the Richelieu and Saint Lawrence River. By June 11, American forces had been defeated by British troops near Trois-Rivières, Quebec, and they abandoned Sorel on June 14, just three hours before the British arrived. Shreve was back at Fort Ticonderoga June 16, 1776, and remained there until November, when the enlistments for the 2nd New Jersey expired.

By April 1777, Shreve and his regiment were in Princeton, New Jersey. He spent the summer in Reading, Pennsylvania, and returned to service in November 1777. From March to May 1778, Shreve and the 2nd New Jersey were stationed at Haddonfield, New Jersey. In mid-June, the British, now under the command of General Sir Henry Clinton, departed Philadelphia, crossed the Delaware River and began their march in a northeasterly direction across New Jersey. When some of his men burned Shreve's home and other buildings near Georgetown, Clinton offered a reward of 25 guineas for information on the soldiers' identities. Shreve's 2nd New Jersey pursued the British to Monmouth Courthouse, site of the Battle of Monmouth on June 28, 1778. Shreve walked over the battlefield after the British had retreated farther north to New York.

The following year Shreve took the 2nd New Jersey on the Sullivan Expedition. They left Easton, Pennsylvania, on June 18, 1779, arriving in Wyoming, Pennsylvania, five days later. They remained in Wyoming more than a month before loading 117 rowboats with 1,200 pack horses and 900 cattle. The regiment reached Wyalusing, Pennsylvania, on August 5 and Tioga Point on August 11. The next day General John Sullivan ordered his combined forces to Chemung, Pennsylvania, ten miles (16 km) west of Tioga Point, where they burned an Indian village and Israel's son, John, witnessed a skirmish with a retreating native tribe; a man standing next to him was killed by musket fire. Both Israel and John Shreve returned to an army fort at Tioga while Sullivan led his command farther west.

In November 1779, Shreve led the 2nd New Jersey Regiment to the Continental Army's winter encampment at Morristown, New Jersey. On June 7, 1780, the British Army under Henry Clinton crossed from Staten Island to New Jersey. On June 23, they came west from Elizabeth, New Jersey, toward Chatham and Morristown, and met Americans at Springfield Township. The ensuing fight became known as the Battle of Springfield. Shreve's men waited at a bridge just west of the village of Springfield as Hessians under Lieutenant General Wilhelm, Baron von Knyphausen came from the east. As Shreve's men fired cannons, a musket ball crashed into a soldier standing next to John Shreve, and as he turned his companion over another musket ball hit John's calf. Israel Shreve's regiment was in danger of being surrounded, so General Nathanael Greene ordered him to retreat.

On January 20, 1781, Shreve alerted Washington about revolt in the New Jersey Line of the Continental Army at Pompton, New Jersey, "It is with pain I inform your Excellency, that the troops at this place revolted this evening and marched towards Trenton. Their behavior and demands are similar to those of the Pennsylvania line." Washington answered the same day requesting to suppress the Pompton Mutiny, which was accomplished by General Robert Howe.

Shreve resigned his commission in the Continental Army in January 1781. Two years later, he joined other New Jersey officers in becoming a founding member of the Society of the Cincinnati in the State of New Jersey.

=== Expeditions ===
In 1788, he led his wife and six of his children, along with 21 other settlers to southwestern Pennsylvania, and settled in Rostraver Township, Pennsylvania.

From January 1789 to June 1789, Shreve accompanied retired Continental Army colonel George Morgan to Spanish Louisiana Territory to survey the western bank of the Mississippi River. Morgan, who was a land developer, received permission from the Spanish Ambassador to the United States, Don Diego de Gardoqui to establish a colony on the Mississippi River at Anse a la Graisse, located in present-day Missouri.

On January 3, 1789, the expedition departed from Pittsburgh and traveled along the Ohio and Mississippi River until they reached Anse a la Graisse; a new town was demarcated and named New Madrid by Morgan. On June 19, 1789, members of the expedition including Shreve safely returned to Pittsburgh. During the journey, Shreve kept a journal, in which he described geography, environment, and encounters with the Native Americans.

Instead of moving to New Madrid, Shreve decided to lease land in Fayette County, Pennsylvania, from General George Washington. Shreve contracted to buy 1,744 acres (7.06 km^{2}) of land from Washington but spent several years haggling over payments and prices despite settling on the land. Washington threatened to bring a lawsuit for payment, but no suit was recorded. Washington wrote Shreve in 1798 and 1799, asking for payments but could not bring himself to sue a fellow Continental Army officer. On December 21, 1798, Shreve wrote Washington, asking for delay in payments.

== Death ==
Israel Shreve and George Washington, although hundreds of miles apart, died on the same day, December 14, 1799.
