= Mansfield Township, Burlington County, New Jersey =

Township in Burlington County, New Jersey, US

Mansfield Township, New Jersey
- Township
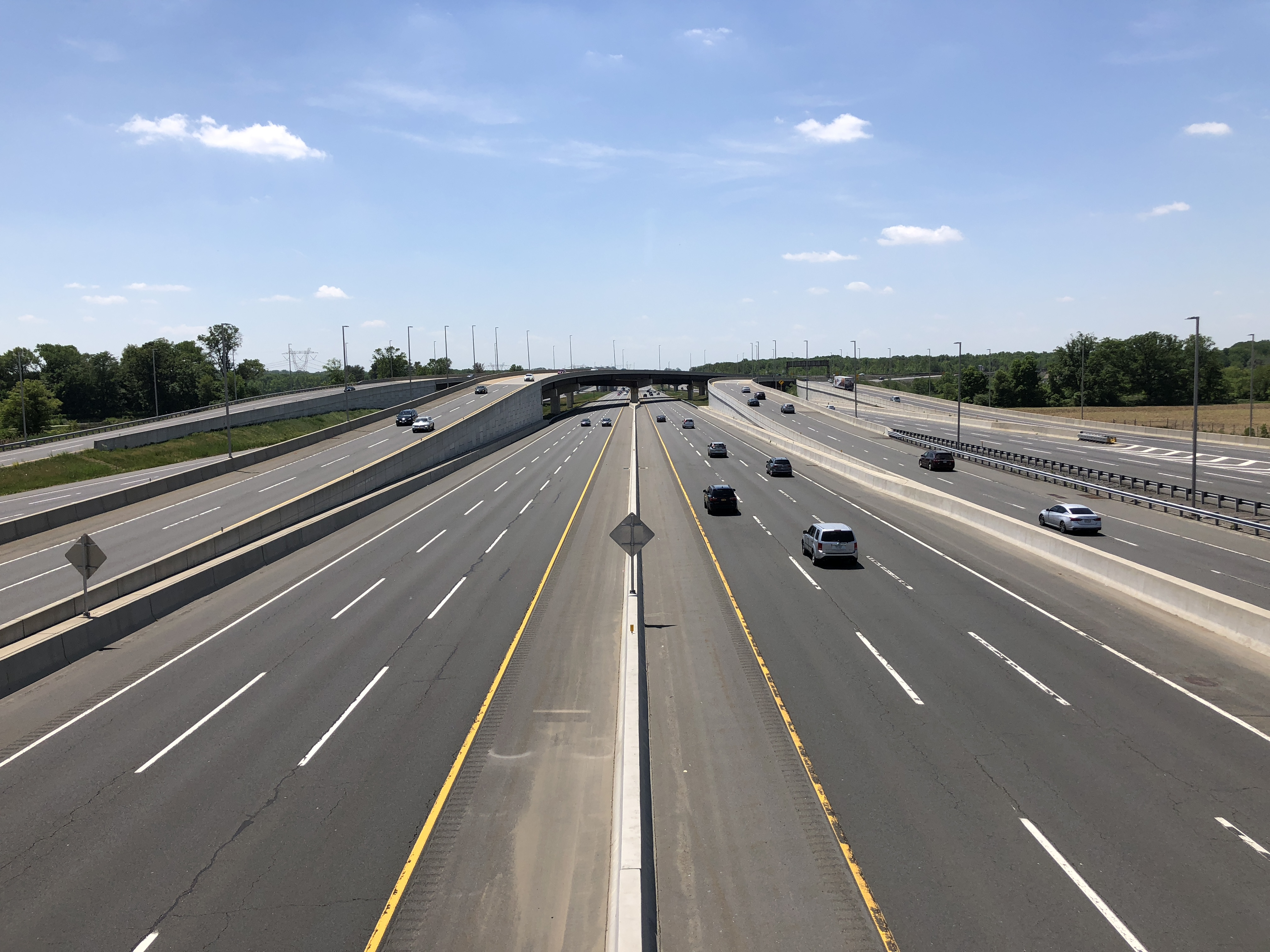
- Interchange of Interstate 95/New Jersey Turnpike and the Pennsylvania Turnpike Extension in Mansfield Township

- Seal

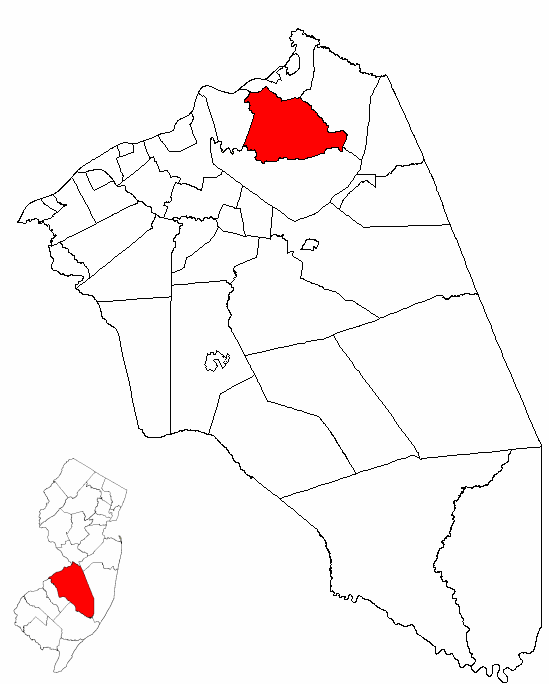
- Location of Mansfield Township in Burlington County, New Jersey (right) and of Burlington County in New Jersey (left)

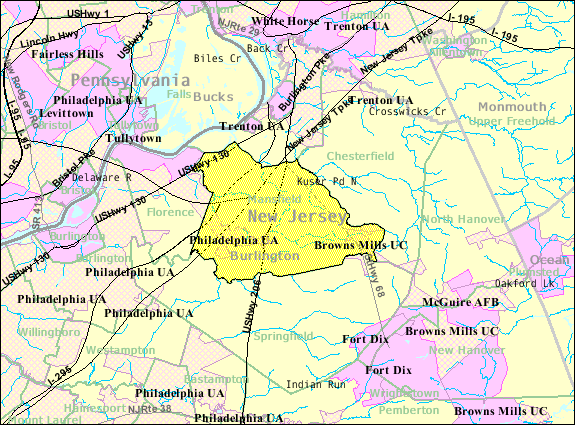
- Census Bureau map of Mansfield Township, Burlington County, New Jersey

- Location in Burlington County Location in New Jersey Location in the United States
- Coordinates: 40.087416°N 74.712259°W
- Country: United States
- State: New Jersey
- County: Burlington
- Formed: November 6, 1688
- Royal charter: May 9, 1770
- Incorporated: February 21, 1798
- Named after: Mansfield, England

Government
  - Type: Township
  - Body: Township Committee
  - Mayor: Marcial Mojena (R, term ends December 31, 2024)
  - Municipal clerk: Ashley Jolly

Area
  - Total: 21.89 sq mi (56.69 km^{2})
  - Land: 21.73 sq mi (56.29 km^{2})
  - Water: 0.15 sq mi (0.40 km^{2}) 0.71%
  - Rank: 128th of 565 in state 13th of 40 in county
- Elevation: 66 ft (20 m)

Population (2020)
  - Total: 8,897
  - Estimate (2023): 8,991
  - Rank: 266th of 565 in state 20th of 40 in county
  - Density: 409.4/sq mi (158.1/km^{2})
  - Rank: 456th of 565 in state 31st of 40 in county
- Time zone: UTC−05:00 (Eastern (EST))
  - Summer (DST): UTC−04:00 (Eastern (EDT))
- ZIP Code: 08022 – Columbus
- Area code: 609
- FIPS code: 340053290
- GNIS feature ID: 0882108
- Website: www.mansfieldtwp.com

Mansfield Township is a township in Burlington County, in the U.S. state of New Jersey. As of the 2020 United States census, the township's population was 8,897, an increase of 353 (+4.1%) from the 2010 census count of 8,544, which in turn reflected an increase of 3,454 (+67.9%) from the 5,090 counted in the 2000 census. The township, and all of Burlington County, is a part of the Philadelphia metropolitan area.

== History ==
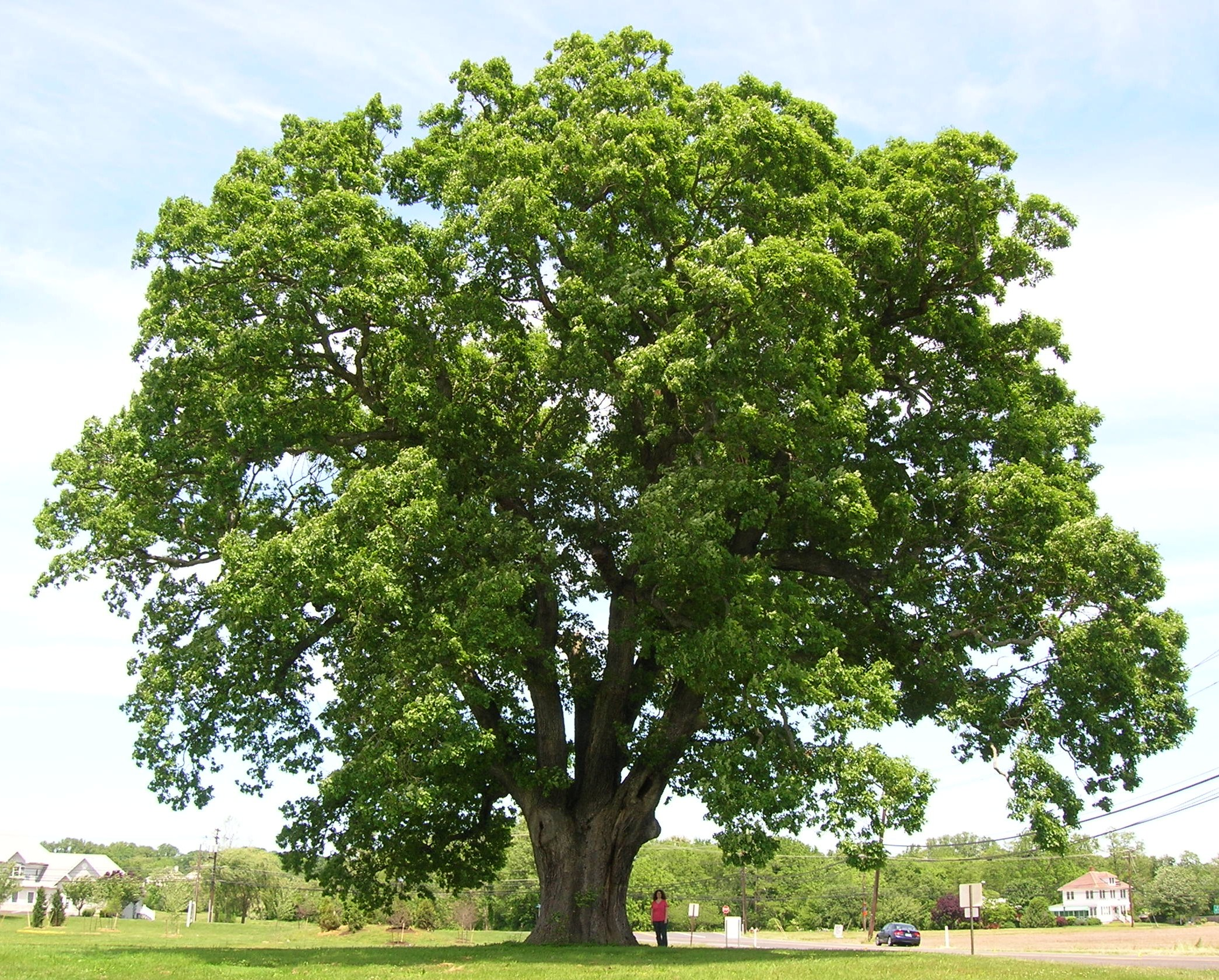
Historic White Oak Tree, known as the Keeler Oak

Before European settlement, the land that would become Mansfield Township was occupied by the Lenape Native Americans. Mansfield was first formed on November 6, 1688, and reformed by Royal charter on May 9, 1770. Mansfield was incorporated by an act of the New Jersey Legislature on February 21, 1798, as one of New Jersey's initial group of 104 townships. Portions of the township were taken to form Fieldsboro (March 7, 1850, within township; became fully independent c. 1894), Bordentown Township (March 8, 1852) and Florence Township (March 7, 1872).

The township was named for Mansfield, England.

== Geography ==
According to the United States Census Bureau, the township had a total area of 21.89 square miles (56.69 km^{2}), including 21.73 square miles (56.29 km^{2}) of land and 0.16 square miles (0.40 km^{2}) of water (0.71%).

The township borders the Burlington County municipalities of Bordentown Township (to the north and northeast), Chesterfield Township (northeast), Florence Township (southwest) and Springfield Township (south).

Unincorporated communities, localities and place names located partially or completely within the township include Bishops Barn, Columbus (where the town hall is located), Georgetown, Hedding, Kinkora, Mansfield, Rising Sun Square (also known as Mansfield Square) and Three Tuns. Homestead, a retirement village, consists of 1,200 homes in Columbus.

Liberty Lake is a 6-acre (24,000 m^{2}) freshwater spring-fed lake, that allows boating, swimming and fishing.

== Demographics ==
Historical population
Census	Pop.	Note	%±
1810	1,810		—
1820	1,927		6.5%
1830	2,083		8.1%
1840	2,401		15.3%
1850	2,953		23.0%
1860	2,777	*	−6.0%
1870	2,880		3.7%
1880	1,648	*	−42.8%
1890	1,671		1.4%
1900	1,518	*	−9.2%
1910	1,526		0.5%
1920	1,517		−0.6%
1930	1,709		12.7%
1940	1,642		−3.9%
1950	1,907		16.1%
1960	2,084		9.3%
1970	2,597		24.6%
1980	2,523		−2.8%
1990	3,874		53.5%
2000	5,090		31.4%
2010	8,544		67.9%
2020	8,897		4.1%
2023 (est.)	8,991		1.1%
Population sources: 1810–2000 1810–1920 1840; 1850–1870 1850 1870; 1890–1910 1910–1930; 1940–2000 2000; 2010 2020 * = Lost territory in previous decade.

=== 2010 census ===
The 2010 United States census counted 8,544 people, 3,401 households, and 2,452 families in the township. The population density was 393.0 per square mile (151.7/km^{2}). There were 3,529 housing units at an average density of 162.3 per square mile (62.7/km^{2}). The racial makeup was 79.04% (6,753) White, 10.42% (890) Black or African American, 0.16% (14) Native American, 7.69% (657) Asian, 0.06% (5) Pacific Islander, 0.62% (53) from other races, and 2.01% (172) from two or more races. Hispanic or Latino of any race were 5.01% (428) of the population.

Of the 3,401 households, 25.6% had children under the age of 18; 63.5% were married couples living together; 6.2% had a female householder with no husband present and 27.9% were non-families. Of all households, 24.8% were made up of individuals and 16.8% had someone living alone who was 65 years of age or older. The average household size was 2.51 and the average family size was 3.01.

20.6% of the population were under the age of 18, 5.4% from 18 to 24, 18.3% from 25 to 44, 27.9% from 45 to 64, and 27.9% who were 65 years of age or older. The median age was 48.9 years. For every 100 females, the population had 90.3 males. For every 100 females ages 18 and older there were 86.0 males.

The Census Bureau's 2006–2010 American Community Survey showed that (in 2010 inflation-adjusted dollars) median household income was $74,671 (with a margin of error of +/− $7,953) and the median family income was $97,774 (+/− $17,454). Males had a median income of $62,215 (+/− $5,997) versus $57,917 (+/− $10,212) for females. The per capita income for the borough was $38,899 (+/− $4,224). About 2.5% of families and 2.7% of the population were below the poverty line, including 2.6% of those under age 18 and 3.6% of those age 65 or over.

=== 2000 census ===
As of the 2000 United States census there were 5,090 people, 2,077 households, and 1,561 families residing in the township. The population density was 234.3 inhabitants per square mile (90.5/km^{2}). There were 2,122 housing units at an average density of 97.7 per square mile (37.7/km^{2}). The racial makeup of the township was 95.42% White, 1.91% African American, 0.18% Native American, 1.49% Asian, 0.04% Pacific Islander, 0.22% from other races, and 0.75% from two or more races. Hispanic or Latino of any race were 1.83% of the population.

There were 2,077 households, out of which 23.8% had children under the age of 18 living with them, 68.4% were married couples living together, 4.5% had a female householder with no husband present, and 24.8% were non-families. 22.6% of all households were made up of individuals, and 17.0% had someone living alone who was 65 years of age or older. The average household size was 2.45 and the average family size was 2.86.

In the township the population was spread out, with 18.7% under the age of 18, 4.9% from 18 to 24, 21.4% from 25 to 44, 23.1% from 45 to 64, and 31.9% who were 65 years of age or older. The median age was 49 years. For every 100 females, there were 92.2 males. For every 100 females age 18 and over, there were 87.8 males.

The median income for a household in the township was $50,757, and the median income for a family was $59,040. Males had a median income of $45,560 versus $40,968 for females. The per capita income for the township was $26,559. About 2.9% of families and 4.5% of the population were below the poverty line, including 2.9% of those under age 18 and 4.3% of those age 65 or over.

== Government ==
=== Local government ===
Mansfield Township is governed under the Township form of government, one of 141 municipalities (of the 564) statewide that use this form of government. The Township Committee is comprised of five members who are elected directly by the voters at-large in partisan elections to serve three-year terms of office on a staggered basis, with either one or two seats coming up for election each year as part of the November general election in a three-year cycle. At an annual reorganization meeting, the Township Committee selects one of its members to serve as Mayor and another as Deputy Mayor. Legislative and executive powers of the township are exercised by the Township Committee as a whole, with the mayor presiding over meetings and voting as a member of the committee.

As of 2024, members of the Mansfield Township Committee are Mayor Marcial Mojena (R, term on committee ends December 31, 2024; term as mayor ends 2024), Deputy Mayor Brian Sisz (R, 2024), Tim Boyd (R, 2025), Valerie Jennings (R, 2026), and Kelly Stobie (R, 2026).

==== Local elections ====
In 2020, independent candidates Dan Golenda and Bob Tallon ran a successful write-in campaign against incumbent Republicans Janice DiGiuseppe and her running mate Efthimios "Paul" Tsiknakis, winning 4,812 total votes versus 4,262. This was in response to a public outcry of Mansfield losing an affordable housing litigation suit, and the then-committee voting several actively-farmed parcels as "redevelopment" to cover financial issues in the township, which started a warehousing boom in the community. The following year 2021, Marcial Mojena (R) and Paul 'Brian' Sisz (R) ran a similarly successful "No More Warehouses" campaign. In 2022, the committee adopted an ordinance to remove warehousing as a permitted use in all zones of the township, until the impact from the currently approved warehouses in the township could be evaluated.

Janice A. DiGiuseppe resigned in August 2015, citing personal reasons for leaving office after five years. The following month, the council selected Laverne Cholewa from a list of three candidates nominated by the Republican municipal committee to fill the vacancy. In November 2015, Cholewa was elected to serve the two years remaining on the term of office previously held by DiGiuseppe.

In 2023, Republicans Valerie Jennings and Kelly Stobie were elected, returning the Township Committee to 5-0 Republican control.

==== 2013 revaluation issues ====
After a property revaluation was completed in 2013 and based on changes in tax levies by the municipality and the local school districts, the property tax rate increased by almost 50%, from $2.01 per $100 in assessed value in 2012 to $2.93 in 2013. A group of residents has complained to the New Jersey Division of Taxation, claiming that home values had been calculated incorrectly and arbitrarily, showing data that a sample of smaller homes saw taxes drop 8% while taxes on larger homes increased by 10%. The Mansfield Township tax assessor denied the claims and responded that the revaluation complied with all state legal requirements.

=== Federal, state and county representation ===
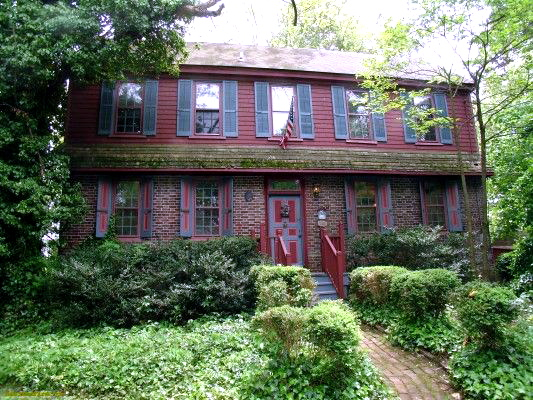
Mount Pleasant, built in 1742 in the township, was the home of many generations of Shreves, who descended from Caleb Shreve and Sarah Areson, his wife.

Mansfield Township is located in the 3rd Congressional District and is part of New Jersey's 8th state legislative district.

For the 119th United States Congress, New Jersey's 3rd congressional district is currently represented Herb Conaway (D, Delran Township). New Jersey is represented in the United States Senate by Democrats Cory Booker (Newark, term ends 2027) and Andy Kim (Moorestown, term ends 2031).

For the 2026–2027 session, the 8th legislative district of the New Jersey Legislature is represented in the New Jersey Senate by Latham Tiver (R, Southampton Township) and in the General Assembly by Anthony Angelozzi (D, Hammonton) and Andrea Katz (D, Chesterfield Township).

Burlington County is governed by a Board of County Commissioners comprised of five members who are chosen at-large in partisan elections to serve three-year terms of office on a staggered basis, with either one or two seats coming up for election each year; at an annual reorganization meeting, the board selects a director and deputy director from among its members to serve a one-year term. As of 2026, Burlington County's Commissioners are: Director Felicia Hopson (D, Willingboro Township, term as commissioner ends December 31, 2027; term as director ends 2026), Deputy Director Allison Eckel (D, Medford, term as commissioner ends 2028; term as deputy director ends 2026), Randy Brolo (D, Lumberton, 2026; elected to an unexpired term), Tyler Burrell (D, Delran Township, 2027) and Tom Pullion (D, Edgewater Park, 2026).

Burlington County's constitutional officers are Clerk Joanne Schwartz (D, Southampton Township, 2028), Sheriff James H. Kostoplis (D, Bordentown, 2028) and Surrogate Brian J. Carlin (D, Burlington Township, 2026).

=== Politics ===
United States presidential election results for Mansfield Township 2024 2020 2016 2012 2008 2004
Year	Republican		Democratic		Third party(ies)	
Year	No.	%	No.	%	No.	%
2024	2,780	50.17%	2,678	48.33%	83	1.50%
2020	3,058	49.58%	3,043	49.34%	67	1.09%
2016	2,682	50.62%	2,451	46.26%	165	3.11%
2012	2,447	49.05%	2,499	50.09%	43	0.86%
2008	2,500	48.37%	2,612	50.54%	56	1.08%
2004	2,494	52.30%	2,237	46.91%	38	0.80%

As of March 2011, there were a total of 6,195 registered voters in Mansfield Township, of which 1,838 (29.7% vs. 33.3% countywide) were registered as Democrats, 1,957 (31.6% vs. 23.9%) were registered as Republicans and 2,396 (38.7% vs. 42.8%) were registered as Unaffiliated. There were 4 voters registered as Libertarians or Greens. Among the township's 2010 Census population, 72.5% (vs. 61.7% in Burlington County) were registered to vote, including 91.3% of those ages 18 and over (vs. 80.3% countywide).

In the 2012 presidential election, Democrat Barack Obama received 2,499 votes here (49.6% vs. 58.1% countywide), ahead of Republican Mitt Romney with 2,447 votes (48.6% vs. 40.2%) and other candidates with 43 votes (0.9% vs. 1.0%), among the 5,037 ballots cast by the township's 6,411 registered voters, for a turnout of 78.6% (vs. 74.5% in Burlington County). In the 2008 presidential election, Democrat Barack Obama received 2,612 votes here (50.2% vs. 58.4% countywide), ahead of Republican John McCain with 2,500 votes (48.0% vs. 39.9%) and other candidates with 56 votes (1.1% vs. 1.0%), among the 5,206 ballots cast by the township's 6,277 registered voters, for a turnout of 82.9% (vs. 80.0% in Burlington County). In the 2004 presidential election, Republican George W. Bush received 2,494 votes here (57.0% vs. 46.0% countywide), ahead of Democrat John Kerry with 2,237 votes (51.1% vs. 52.9%) and other candidates with 38 votes (0.9% vs. 0.8%), among the 4,379 ballots cast by the township's 5,822 registered voters, for a turnout of 75.2% (vs. 78.8% in the whole county).

Gubernatorial election results for Mansfield Township
Year	Republican		Democratic		Third party(ies)	
Year	No.	%	No.	%	No.	%
2025	2,260	47.41%	2,496	52.36%	11	0.23%
2021	2,293	54.21%	1,916	45.30%	21	0.50%
2017	1,884	55.10%	1,473	43.08%	62	1.81%
2013	2,254	69.23%	974	29.91%	28	0.86%
2009	1,986	53.59%	1,485	40.07%	235	6.34%
2005	1,731	51.49%	1,475	43.87%	156	4.64%

In the 2013 gubernatorial election, Republican Chris Christie received 2,254 votes here (68.1% vs. 61.4% countywide), ahead of Democrat Barbara Buono with 974 votes (29.4% vs. 35.8%) and other candidates with 28 votes (0.8% vs. 1.2%), among the 3,312 ballots cast by the township's 6,427 registered voters, yielding a 51.5% turnout (vs. 44.5% in the county). In the 2009 gubernatorial election, Republican Chris Christie received 1,986 votes here (53.3% vs. 47.7% countywide), ahead of Democrat Jon Corzine with 1,485 votes (39.9% vs. 44.5%), Independent Chris Daggett with 149 votes (4.0% vs. 4.8%) and other candidates with 86 votes (2.3% vs. 1.2%), among the 3,724 ballots cast by the township's 6,263 registered voters, yielding a 59.5% turnout vs. 44.9% for the county.

United States Senate election results for Mansfield Township1
Year	Republican		Democratic		Third party(ies)	
Year	No.	%	No.	%	No.	%
2024	2,433	45.78%	2,781	52.33%	100	1.88%
2018	2,347	51.30%	1,993	43.56%	235	5.14%
2012	2,283	48.58%	2,369	50.41%	47	1.00%
2006	1,665	51.76%	1,489	46.29%	63	1.96%

United States Senate election results for Mansfield Township2
Year	Republican		Democratic		Third party(ies)	
Year	No.	%	No.	%	No.	%
2020	2,971	50.00%	2,898	48.77%	73	1.23%
2014	1,726	54.65%	1,385	43.86%	47	1.49%
2013	1,102	53.50%	905	43.93%	53	2.57%
2008	2,411	51.17%	2,222	47.16%	79	1.68%

== Education ==
Students in public school for kindergarten through sixth grade attend the Mansfield Public Schools. As of the 2021–22 school year, the district, comprised of two schools, had an enrollment of 514 students and 56.4 classroom teachers (on an FTE basis), for a student–teacher ratio of 9.1:1. Schools in the district (with 2021–22 enrollment data from the National Center for Education Statistics) are John Hydock Elementary School with 232 students in grades K-2 and Mansfield Township Elementary School with 279 students in grades 3–6.

Children in public school for seventh through twelfth grades attend the schools of the Northern Burlington County Regional School District, which also serves students from Chesterfield Township, North Hanover Township and Springfield Township, along with children of military personnel based at Joint Base McGuire–Dix–Lakehurst. The schools in the district (with 2021–22 enrollment data from the National Center for Education Statistics) are Northern Burlington County Regional Middle School with 723 students in grades 7–8, and Northern Burlington County Regional High School with 1,441 students in grades 9–12. Both schools are in the Columbus section of Mansfield Township. Using a formula that reflects the population and the value of the assessed property in each of the constituent municipalities, taxpayers in Mansfield Township pay 46.5% of the district's tax levy, with the district's 2013–2014 budget including $35.6 million in spending. The 7–12 district's board of education has nine members, who are elected directly by voters to serve three-year terms of office on a staggered basis, with three seats up for election each year. The nine seats on the Board of Education are allocated based on the population of the constituent municipalities, with two seats assigned to Mansfield Township.

Students from Mansfield Township, and from all of Burlington County, are eligible to attend the Burlington County Institute of Technology, a countywide public school district that serves the vocational and technical education needs of students at the high school and post-secondary level at its campuses in Medford and Westampton.

== Transportation ==
=== Roads and highways ===
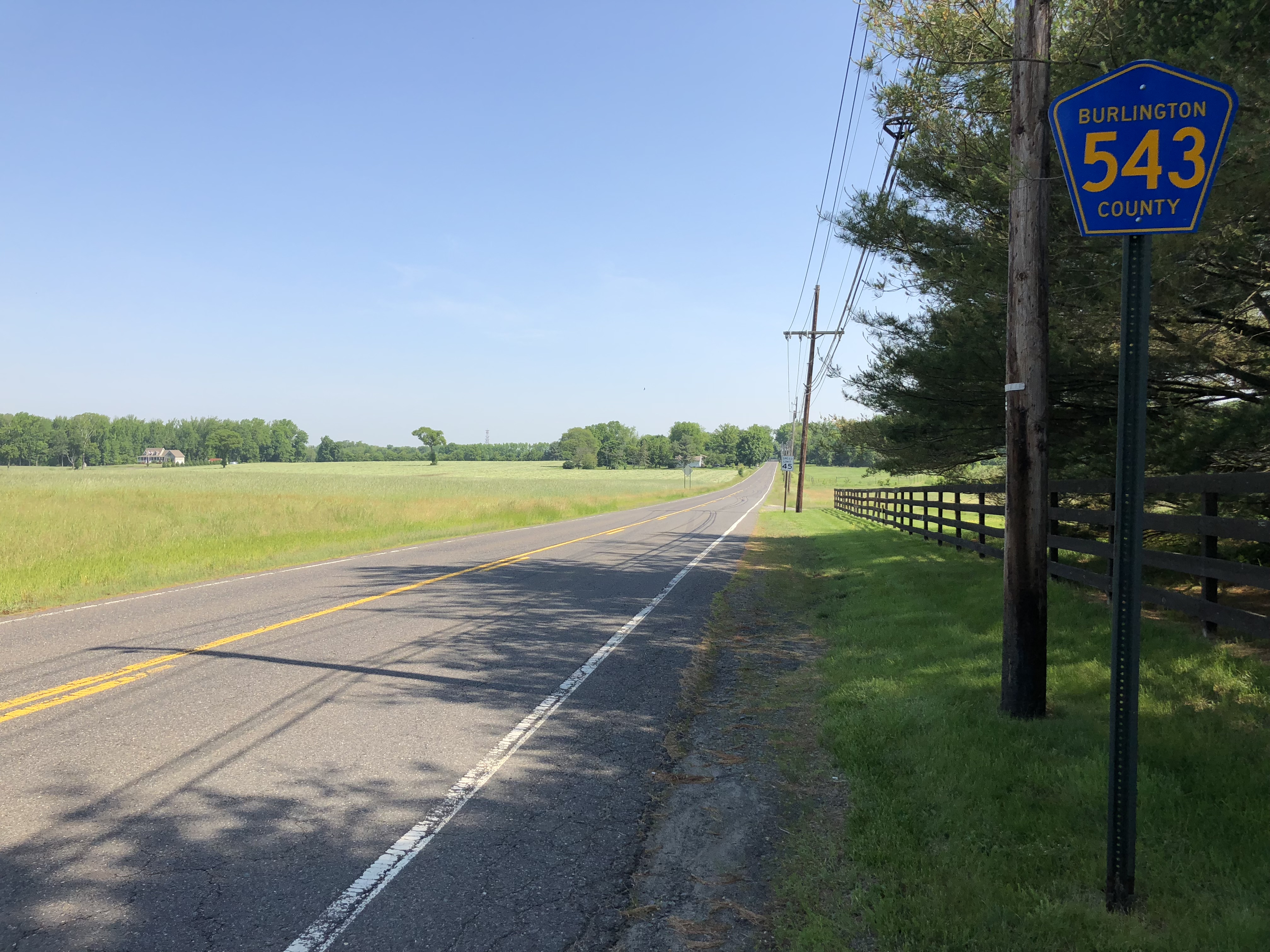
CR 543 northbound (Gaunts Bridge Road) in a rural section of the township

As of 2010, the township had a total of 76.02 miles (122.34 km) of roadways, of which 37.12 miles (59.74 km) were maintained by the municipality, 18.42 miles (29.64 km) by Burlington County and 13.67 miles (22.00 km) by the New Jersey Department of Transportation and 6.81 miles (10.96 km) by the New Jersey Turnpike Authority.

Mansfield is the location where Interstate 95 (I-95) joins the New Jersey Turnpike at Interchange 6. I-95 stretches for 3.1 miles (5.0 km) through the township, connecting Florence Township in the west (via the turnpike's Pennsylvania Extension) to Bordentown Township on the township's northern border (via the mainline turnpike). The mainline of the turnpike continues south from its junction with I-95 into Springfield Township. Local access to Mansfield is via interchanges with U.S. Route 206 in neighboring Bordentown Township and with U.S. Route 130 in neighboring Florence Township.

Interstate 295 also passes through Mansfield, with one interchange, Exit 52, located within the township. Route 68 and County Route 543 also pass through Mansfield.

=== Public transportation ===
NJ Transit provides bus service in the township between Trenton and Philadelphia on the 409 route.

== Notable people ==
People who were born in, residents of, or otherwise closely associated with Mansfield Township include:

- Rosey Brown (1932–2004), offensive tackle who played in the NFL for the New York Giants and was inducted into the Pro Football Hall of Fame
- Oliver Cromwell (1752–1853), African-American soldier, who served with the 2nd New Jersey Regiment of the Continental Army during the American Revolutionary War
- Willie Drewrey (born 1963), wide receiver who played for nine seasons in the NFL for the Houston Oilers and Tampa Bay Buccaneers
- Cedric Jackson (born 1986), professional basketball player for the Cleveland Cavaliers, San Antonio Spurs, and Washington Wizards
- Henry Miller Shreve (1785–1851), inventor and steamboat captain who opened the Mississippi River to steamboat navigation, becoming the namesake of Shreveport, Louisiana
- Israel Shreve (1739–1799), colonel in the 2nd New Jersey Regiment during the American Revolutionary War who fought at the Battle of Springfield
- Eddie Smith (1913–1994), starting pitcher who played for 10 seasons in Major League Baseball and gave up the first hit in Joe DiMaggio's 56-game hitting streak
