= Georgetown, New Jersey =

Populated place in Burlington County, New Jersey, US

- Unincorporated community
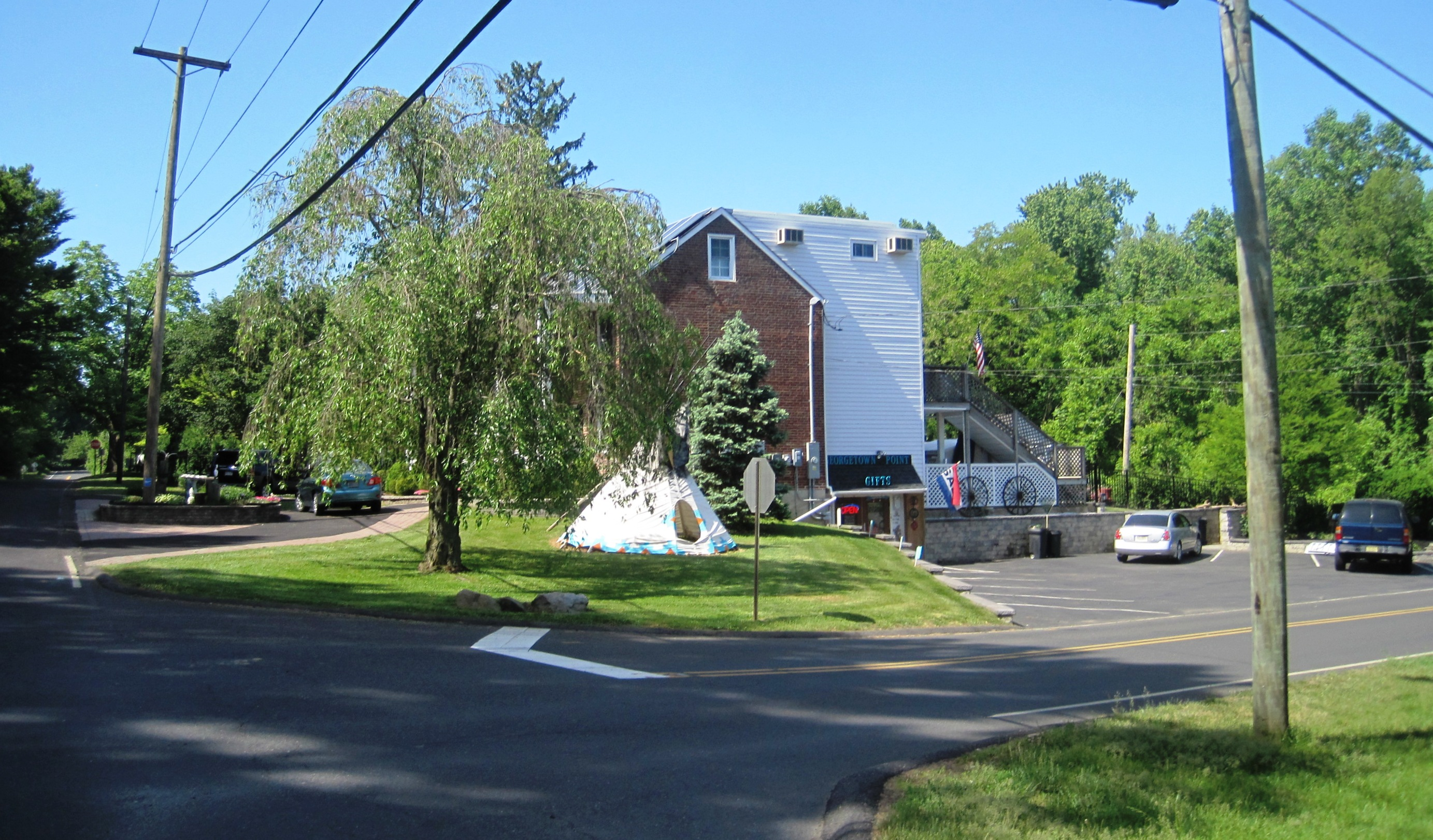
- Center of Georgetown

- Location in Burlington County (Inset: Burlington County in New Jersey) Georgetown (New Jersey) Georgetown (the United States)
- Coordinates: 40°04′46″N 74°39′12″W
- Country: United States
- State: New Jersey
- County: Burlington
- Township: Mansfield
- Named after: George Sykes
- Elevation: 95 ft (29 m)
- Time zone: UTC−05:00 (Eastern (EST))
  - Summer (DST): UTC−04:00 (Eastern (EDT))
- Area codes: 609, 640
- GNIS feature ID: 876588

Georgetown is an unincorporated community located within Mansfield Township, Burlington County, in the U.S. state of New Jersey. It was named for George Sykes, who served in the U.S. Congress.

== Transportation ==
County Route 537, County Route 545, and NJ Route 68 are major roads around Georgetown. The New Jersey Turnpike passes Georgetown to the northwest. The closest exit to Georgetown on the NJ Turnpike is exit 7 (U.S. 206 – Bordentown, Trenton).
