= 2nd New Jersey Regiment =

- Active: 1775–1783
- Allegiance: Continental Congress of the United States
- Type: Infantry
- Part of: New Jersey Line
- Engagements: Battle of Valcour Island, Battle of Brandywine, Battle of Germantown, Battle of Crooked Billet, Battle of Monmouth, the Sullivan Expedition, Battle of Springfield, Battle of Yorktown.

Commanders
- Notable commanders: Colonel William Maxwell; Colonel Israel Shreve; Colonel Elias Dayton

The 2nd New Jersey Regiment was raised, on 9 October 1775, at Trenton, New Jersey, for service with the Continental Army under the command of Colonel William Maxwell. The regiment would see action at the Battle of Trois-Rivières, Battle of Valcour Island, Battle of Brandywine, Battle of Germantown, Battle of Crooked Billet, Battle of Monmouth, Sullivan Expedition, Battle of Springfield and the Battle of Yorktown. The regiment was furloughed, on 6 June 1783, at Newburgh, New York, and disbanded 3 November 1783.

== History ==
=== 1775-1776 ===
On 9 October 1775, the 2nd NJ Battalion was authorized as part of the first establishment of the Continental Army. Originally New Jersey's contribution for 1776 was to be two battalions, but this was raised to three.

From December 1775 to February 1776, the battalion was mustered and organized at Burlington and Trenton, to consist of eight companies from Gloucester, Hunterdon, Burlington, Salem, and Sussex counties. The men served under Colonel William "Scotch Willie" Maxwell for an enlistment of one year.

From March to May 1776, the battalion was assigned to the Canadian Department, the regiment belatedly taking part in the investment of Quebec. The leading contingent arrived at the city on 25 March. The siege of Quebec ended on 5 May 1776. On 8 June 1776, after enduring the retreat from Quebec, the regiment took part in the ill-executed Battle of Trois-Rivières, Canada.

From July to November 1776, the battalion took part in the retreat from Canada to Crown Point and then to Fort Ticonderoga, New York. The unit formed part of the garrison there until 13 November when they returned to New Jersey.

In November 1776, with orders to reinforce Washington's army, the battalion marched to Morristown, New Jersey, where they arrived about 3 December and were disbanded when one-year enlistments expired. Many of the men reenlisted in the second establishment of the regiment for three-year enlistments.

=== 1777-1778 ===
The newly formed regiment headquartered in Burlington and then Princeton until 5 April, until it was ordered to join the main army under General Washington. On 22 May 1777, Maxwell's Jersey Brigade and Conway's Pennsylvania Brigade were ordered to form a division under Lord (General William Alexander) Stirling. The regiment was stationed through June 1777 in the area between Middlebrook (modern-day Metuchen) and Short Hills, keeping watch on, and occasionally skirmishing with, the enemy.

On 26 June 1777, Stirling's Division was attacked at Short Hills by General William Howe's British and Hessian troops. After a sharp fight, the Americans retired to Middlebrook and rejoined the main army under Washington. A period of marching and countermarching ensued after the action at Short Hills. General Howe's forces sailed on board the British fleet on 24 July, their destination unknown. Unable to decide their objective, General Washington determined to cover all possibilities while waiting for news of the fleet. Stirling's Division moved from Middlebrook across the Hudson to Peekskill, New York, and then back south again into Pennsylvania. At their camp at "The Cross Roads", in Bucks County, news was finally received that the British were in the Chesapeake.

On 11 September 1777, Israel Shreve's Regiment, along with the rest of the Jersey Brigade, took part in the Battle of Brandywine. Forced to move from their positions on the right of the army, along the creek, Stirling's Division marched to a hill near Birmingham Meeting House to counter a British flank attack. The three Continental divisions on the hill caught the full force of Howe's assault, which included the British Brigade of Guards, grenadiers, and light infantry. After an action of about 45 minutes, the defenders were forced to give way. With the army's right flank defeated, the battle was lost and the Americans retreated to Chester, Pennsylvania. During the fighting on Birmingham Hill, Colonel Israel Shreve was wounded in the thigh and did not return to duty until November.

From September to October 1777, the army undertook a series of marches and maneuvers designed to cover both the magazine at Reading, Pennsylvania and the capital at Philadelphia. In spite of their efforts, the city fell to the British. On 4 October 1777, at the Battle of Germantown, Washington's army assaulted the British encamped outside of Philadelphia. Maxwell's Brigade formed part of the reserve and as such attacked the Chew House in which members of the British 40th Foot had barricaded themselves as the Continentals swept through town. After a series of futile assaults, the Jersey troops were forced to give up the attempt when the battle was lost and the Americans retreated.

On 2 November 1777, the 2nd New Jersey Regiment arrived at Whitemarsh, Pennsylvania, with the rest of the Army. They remained there for six weeks. On 19 December 1777, Shreve's Regiment entered winter quarters at Valley Forge and stayed there until ordered, on 19 March 1778, to take post in Haddonfield, New Jersey.

Through the spring of 1778, on detached duty and in cooperation with the Jersey Militia, the 2nd New Jersey gathered forage and supplies, and skirmished with the British and Loyalists for two months. At the end of May, the rest of Maxwell's Brigade joined them at Mount Holly.

On 4 and 5 April 1778, British forces repulsed Major Richard Howell and his troops from Billingsport, New Jersey. British troops attacked Swedesboro and marched on towards Haddonfield. Col. Israel Shreve evacuated from Haddonfield about 2 am Sunday morning, 5 April, and speed marched his troops to Mount Holly. Haddonfield was attacked, two Quaker houses were burned, and American rider Miles Sage was stabbed multiple times by British (but survived). British troops proceeded to Cooper's Ferry (present site of the New Jersey access of the Benjamin Franklin Bridge). A pitched battle ensued, with about 50 American troops (most of whom were part of Shreve's Regiment), led by Major William Ellis (Gloucester Militia). Orders had been given by Shreve (and sent by Miles Sage) to vacate upon the ignition of an alarm cannon. The cannon was never fired, and Ellis refused to retreat across the Cooper Creek Bridge. Many men were wounded, killed or captured. The British were furious about the lost opportunity to capture Shreve at Haddonfield but elated about the capture of the American picket at Cooper's Ferry (including a set of spy glasses given by Washington to spy upon the Philadelphia shore). Washington was furious at Shreve and never forgave him.

Through June 1778, the reunited Jersey Brigade kept watch on the British in Philadelphia in anticipation of their evacuation. On 28 June Maxwell's Brigade formed a part of Gen. Charles Lee's advance force in the opening phases of the Battle of Monmouth. Hampered by confused orders and heavy pressure from the British, Lee's troops retreated in disorder until they were met by the main army under Washington. The 2nd New Jersey covered the retreat of Lee's forces and fell back as reserves for the rest of the engagement.

From June to December 1778, the Jersey Brigade was stationed in and around Elizabethtown, New Jersey, to cover the area and counter any British moves from New York through the summer and autumn.

=== 1779-1783 ===
From 16 December 1778 to 29 May 1779, the unit was ordered into winter quarters at or near Newark, New Jersey, where they remained until spring. At the end of May they marched to Easton, Pennsylvania, to join the expedition against the Iroquois, forming under Major General John Sullivan.

From 18 June to October 1779, the 2nd Regiment took part in Sullivan's campaign to destroy the power of the Indian allies of the British. They marched through Pennsylvania and into western New York, burning villages and laying waste to crops. On 24 August General Sullivan's army left Tioga, Pennsylvania, leaving behind Colonel Israel Shreve and a mixed detachment to garrison a small work called Fort Sullivan. The remainder of the regiment marched north with the rest of the army. On 29 August a force of Iroquois and Loyalist troops attempted an ambush at Newtown (present-day Elmira, New York), but were defeated and driven from the field. Maxwell's Brigade was in the reserve during this action. The army returned to Easton on 15 October.

On 17 December 1779, the brigade arrived at Eyre's Forge on the Hardscrabble Road, located between Jockey Hollow, Basking Ridge, and Vealtown (present-day Bernardsville). The Jersey regiments made this site their winter quarters, remaining there until April or May 1780.

On 7 June 1780, the 2nd New Jersey took part in the Battle of Connecticut Farms, New Jersey. Colonel Shreve wrote that this "Action was the warmest that has Ever Happened since the war with Our Brigade." From 8 to 22 June the brigade kept watch on British forces encamped behind their fortifications at Elizabethtown. On 23 June Shreve's Regiment saw action in the Battle of Springfield, which resulted in the retreat of the British Army back to Elizabethtown. At midnight on the 23rd the enemy troops crossed back to Staten Island.

From June to November 1780 the Jersey Brigade was situated at several posts to protect the New Jersey side of the Hudson from enemy incursions. In October they moved to West Point and entered barracks in anticipation of remaining there for the winter. The brigade also lost their long-time commander, William Maxwell, having resigned from service. Contrary to expectations the Jersey troops were ordered in November 1780 to take up winter quarters in and around Pompton, New Jersey. With the new year another change in command took place, with Israel Shreve resigning as colonel of the 2nd New Jersey and Colonel Elias Dayton assuming the post.

From 20 to 27 January 1781, the men of the Jersey Brigade at Pompton mutinied to redress their grievances, in emulation of the Pennsylvania troops. The uprising was suppressed quickly with the execution of two of its leaders. In February, after the Pennsylvania Line mutiny, the New Jersey soldiers moved into the old Pennsylvania huts at Mount Kemble (Jockey Hollow). In the same month, two light companies and three battalion companies from the New Jersey line along with the light troops from New England were selected to form a detachment under the Marquis de Lafayette to serve in Virginia. In addition to other skirmishes during the spring and summer, these men saw action on 26 June 1781 at Spencer's Ordinary, near Williamsburg. They were reunited with the rest of the Jersey Brigade at Williamsburg in late September 1781.

During the first six months of the year the two New Jersey regiments kept a large proportion of troops on detached duty, including one company on duty at Wyoming, Pennsylvania. Besides commanding the 2nd Regiment, Colonel Dayton had charge of the brigade, keeping his headquarters at Chatham, New Jersey. On 30 June Dayton was ordered to concentrate the whole brigade at Morristown, excepting the troops at Wyoming.

On 30 June the brigade was ordered to march towards Kingsbridge, New York. They were then redirected towards Dobb's Ferry and remained in that vicinity until August. On 21 July the brigade was ordered to send a detachment of troops to Fort Lee, and on the 28th 150 New Jersey soldiers escorted General Washington as he reconnoitered the British positions at New York from the palisades at Fort Lee.

On 29 August 1781, the Continental army left Springfield, New Jersey, bound for Virginia in an effort to trap British forces under Lord Cornwallis at Yorktown. On 2 September the American forces passed through Philadelphia on their way south; the following day the French army under General Rochambeau marched through the city. One of the places they passed, just south of the city, was the Blue Bell Inn on Cobbs Creek. There are a number of other witness sites along the route. On 5 September the French and British fleets battled for control of Chesapeake Bay. With the defeat of the British fleet the escape of Cornwallis' troops by sea was blocked.

On 23 September 1781, the first contingent of New Jersey troops under General Washington landed near Williamsburg, at which place they joined the force under Lafayette. The siege of Lord Cornwallis' forces at Yorktown began on 29 September. On 14 October, at night, the Jersey Light Infantry under Lt. Colonel Francis Barber took part in the assault and capture of Redoubt Number 10. This was one of two important strongpoints taken, Redoubt Number 9 being captured by French troops. On 19 October, the capitulation of the British and German forces at Yorktown took place, the enemy troops surrendering their arms to the French and American armies.

In December 1781 the New Jersey regiments "take Post somewhere in the Vicinity of Morristown" for their winter cantonment. The troops may have been housed once more in the old Pennsylvania Line huts at Mount Kemble. Through the first half of the year the Jersey regiments spent most of the time in small detachments doing duty as guards and picquets. On 29 August they left their huts and marched north to join the main army on the other side of the Hudson at King's Ferry, New York. Leaving Verplank's in October and traveling north, they marched from "Murderer's Creek" on the 29th a distance of "about five miles to our ground for hutting and encamped."

On 30 October General Washington wrote from Newburgh, New York, that the regiments of "New Jersey, are hutting in the Neighborhood of this place" it being "of Importance to the Health, care and comfort of the Troops, as well as economical on many Accounts, that they should be early put into Quarters for the Winter." This, the last cantonment for the army, was located at New Windsor, New York.

This last winter was relatively uneventful. Ebenezer Elmer, surgeon's mate and then surgeon to the 2nd New Jersey Regiment from 1777 to 1783, recorded the end of the war in his diary. On 19 April "The cessation of hostilities was announced in camp just eight years from the commencement thereof." And finally "Our brigade received our furloughs, and we all decamped" on 6 June 1783. The war was finally, and successfully, over.
