= Columbus, New Jersey =

Populated place in Burlington County, New Jersey, US

- Unincorporated community
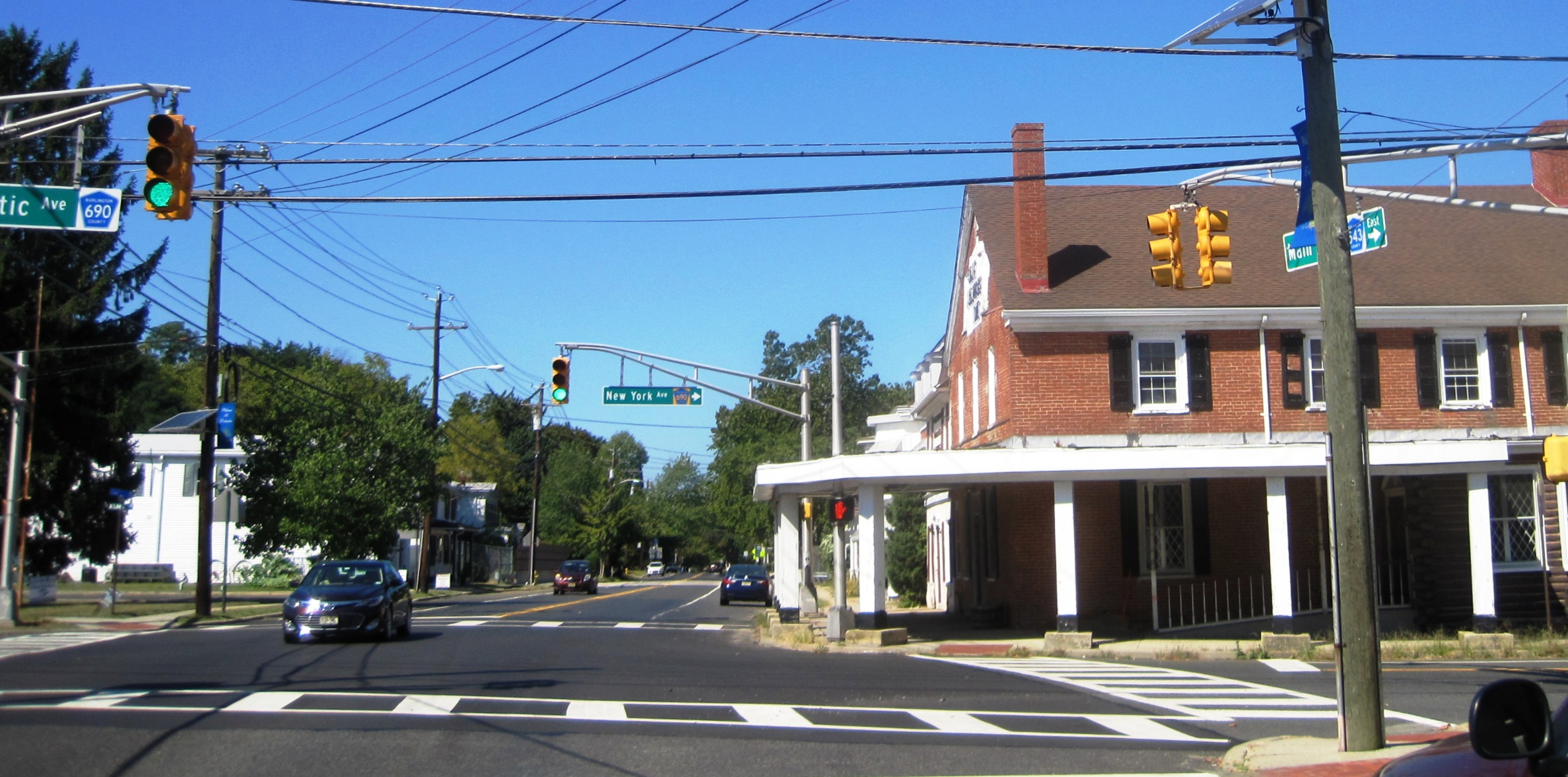
- Center of Columbus

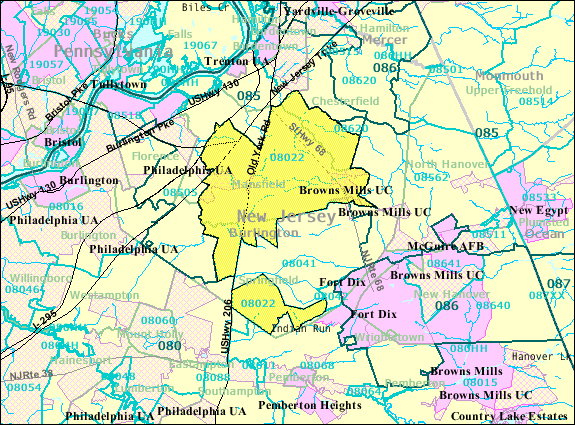
- Census Bureau map of Columbus, New Jersey

- Location of Columbus in Burlington County (Inset: Location of county within the state of New Jersey) Columbus (New Jersey) Columbus (the United States)
- Coordinates: 40°04′21″N 74°43′15″W
- Country: United States
- State: New Jersey
- County: Burlington
- Township: Mansfield
- Elevation: 82 ft (25 m)

Population (2010 census)
  - Total: 8,783
- Time zone: UTC−05:00 (Eastern (EST))
  - Summer (DST): UTC−04:00 (EDT)
- ZIP Code: 08022
- GNIS feature ID: 875584

Columbus is an unincorporated community located within Mansfield Township in Burlington County, in the U.S. state of New Jersey. The area is served as United States Postal Service ZIP Code 08022. Most of Mansfield Township's governmental offices are located in and around Columbus. It is also the main business district in the township with many businesses lining the main roads in the area. It is located at the junction of County Route 543 (which passes east and west through the area) and U.S. Route 206 (US 206) which is a major highway that heads north and south. US 206 originally passed through the center of Columbus on Atlantic Avenue and New York Avenue until it was moved to a short four-lane bypass of downtown in the late 1950s/early 1960s. The old surface route became state-maintained New Jersey Route 170 but became a county-maintained road (Burlington CR 690) in 1986.

As of the 2010 United States census, the population of ZIP Code Tabulation Area 08022 was 8,783.

== History ==
The area had been settled in the 18th century and featured a tavern named Black Horse Tavern. The community was originally known as Black Horse after the tavern, a vote was held in 1795 to determine Burlington County's county seat which featured Black Horse as one of three top vote-getters. Black Horse and the City of Burlington narrowly lost to Mount Holly. The settlement was renamed Columbus around 1827 in honor of Christopher Columbus.

== Notable people ==
People who were born in, residents of, or otherwise closely associated with Columbus include:

- Rosey Brown (1932-2004), offensive tackle who played in the NFL for the New York Giants and was inducted into the Pro Football Hall of Fame.
- Cedric Jackson (born 1986), professional basketball player.
