= List of original members of the Society of the Cincinnati =

This is a list of the founding members of the Society of the Cincinnati.

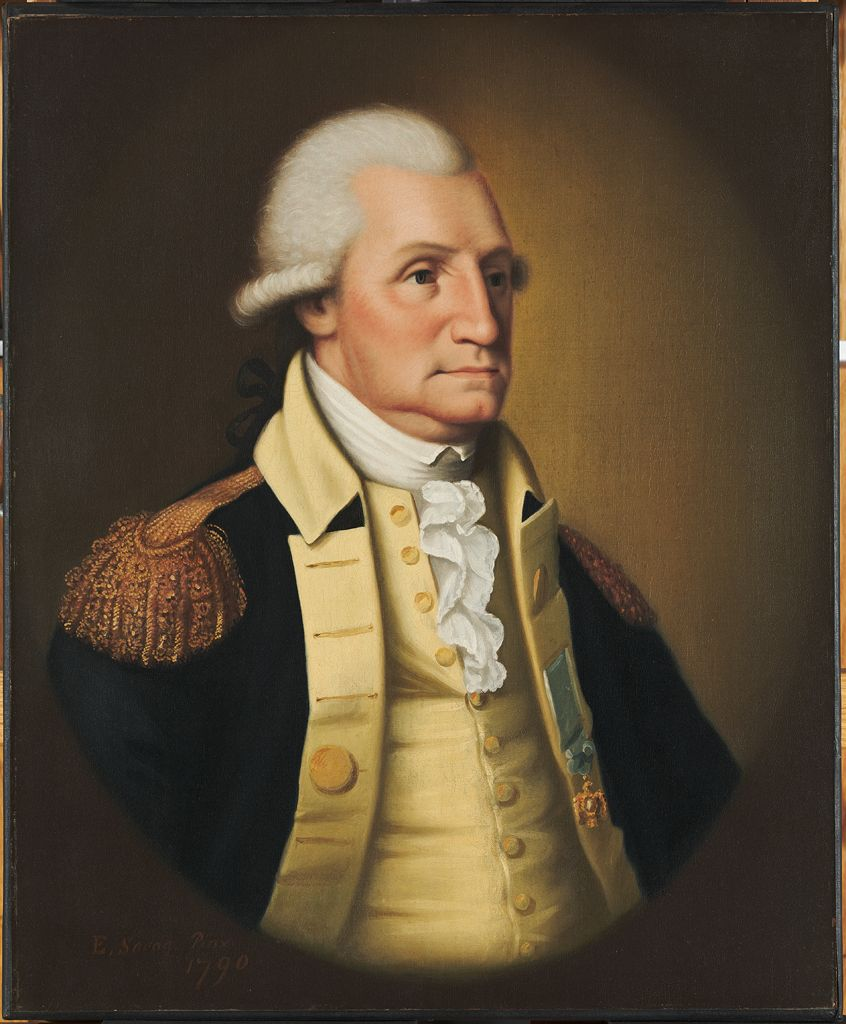
George Washington

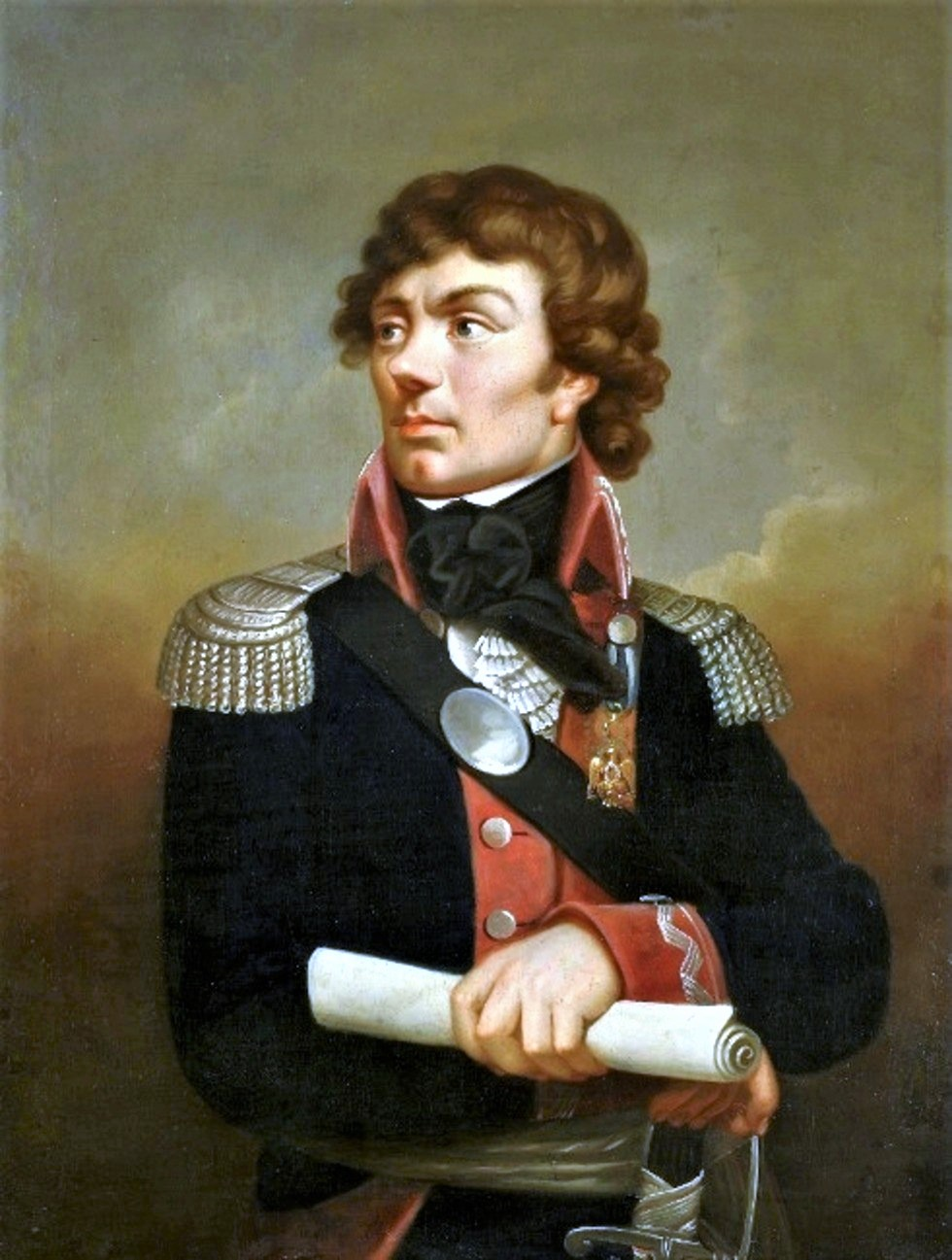
Tadeusz Kościuszko

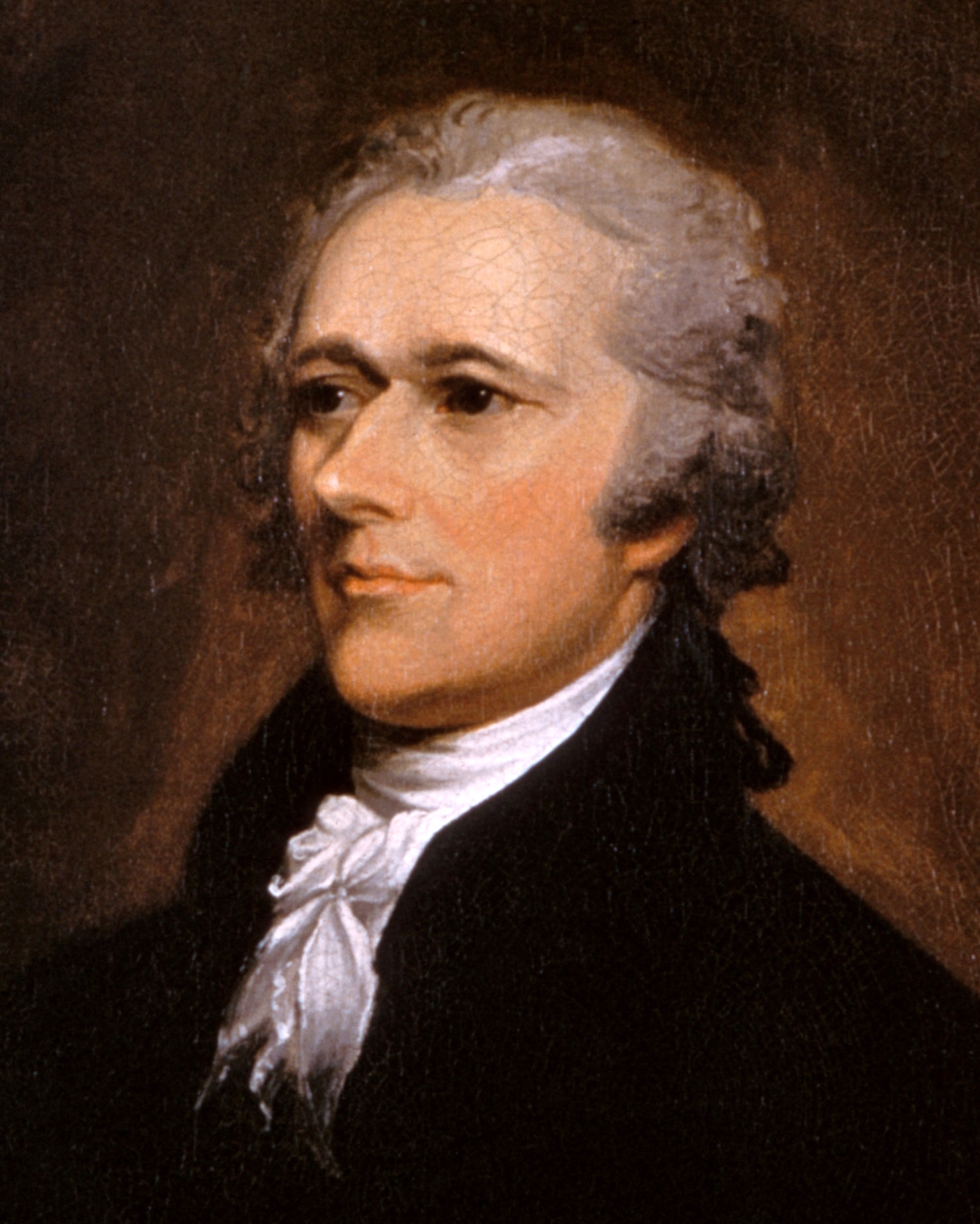
Alexander Hamilton

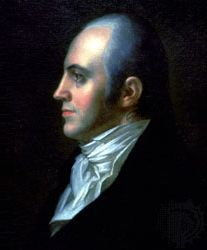
Aaron Burr

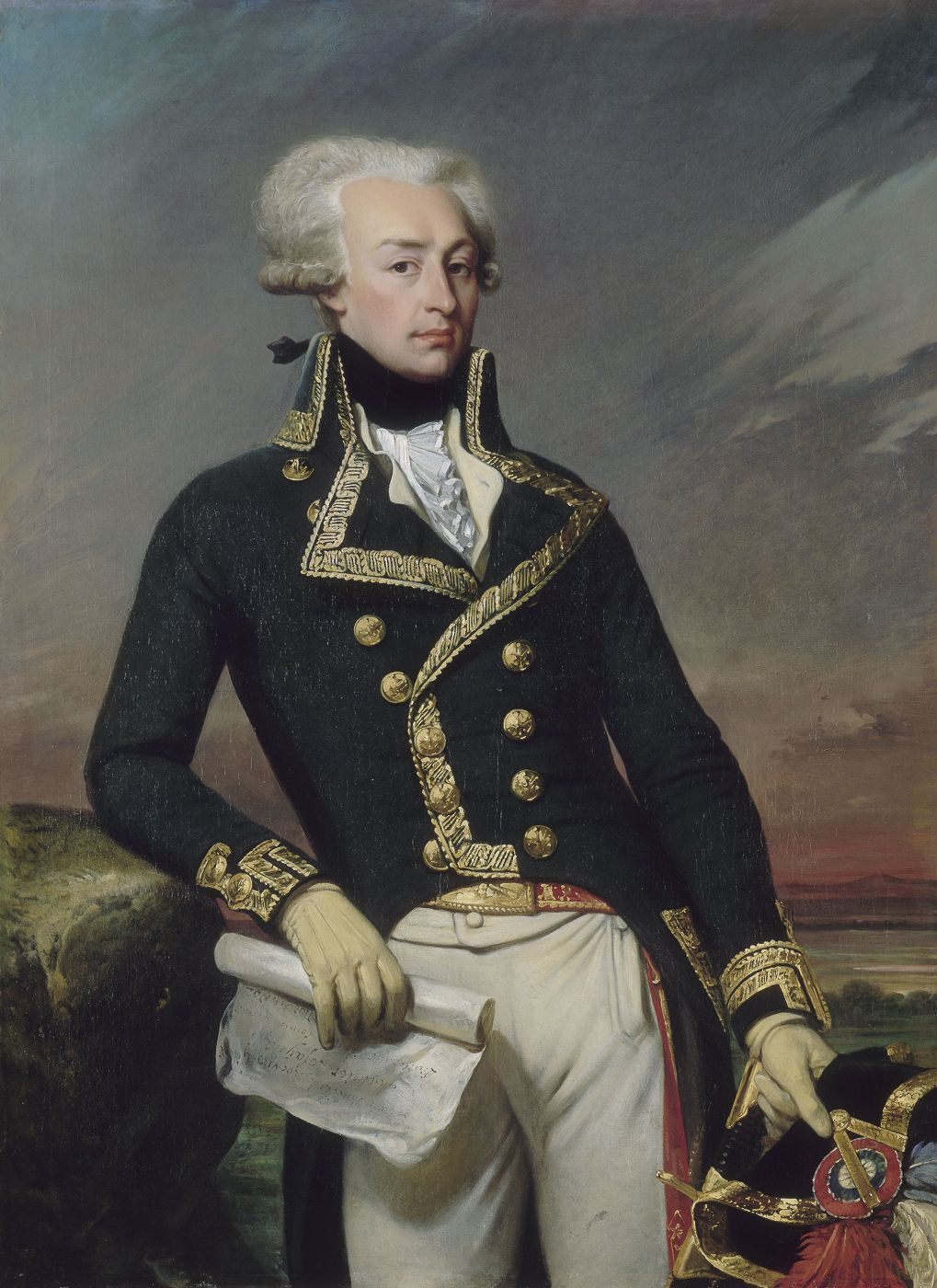
Marquis de Lafayette

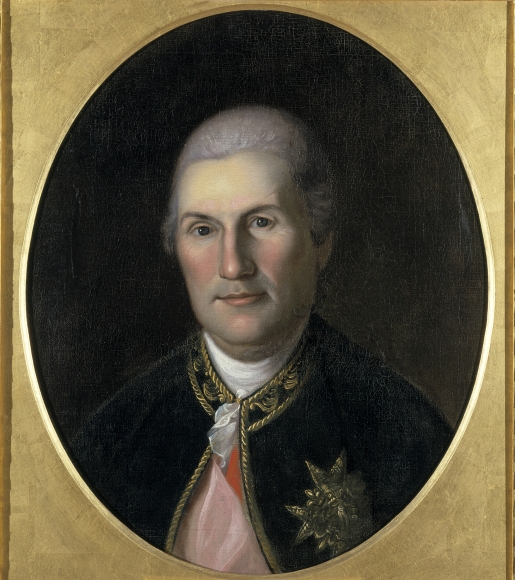
Jean-Baptiste Donatien de Vimeur, comte de Rochambeau

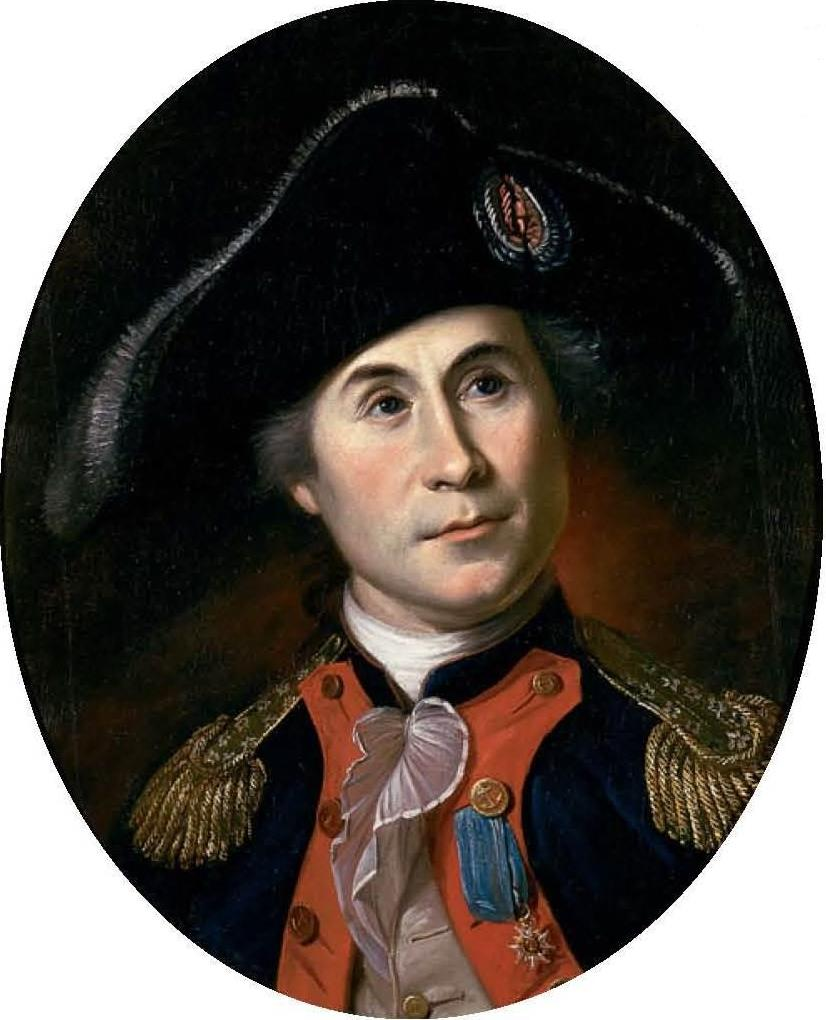
John Paul Jones

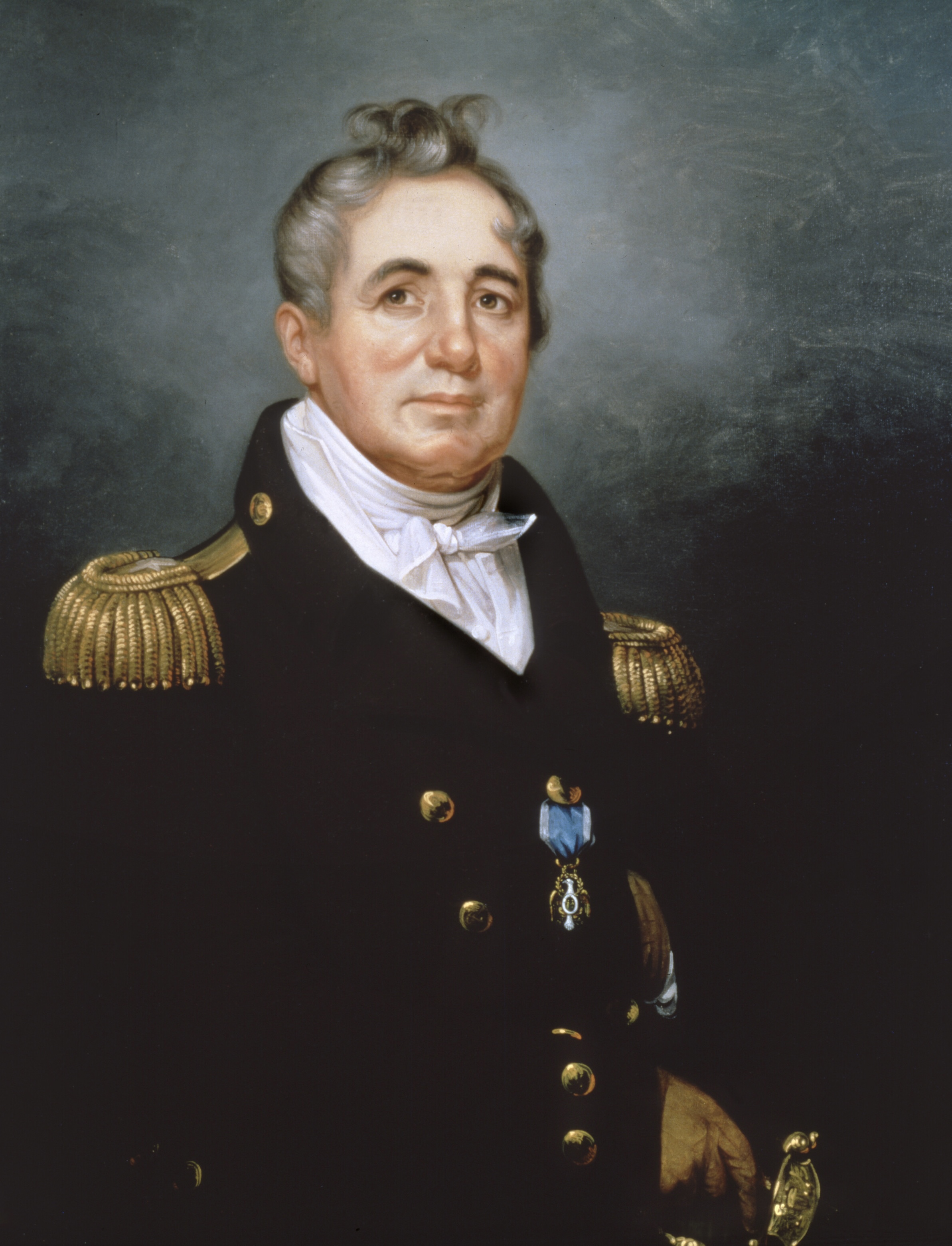
Joshua Barney

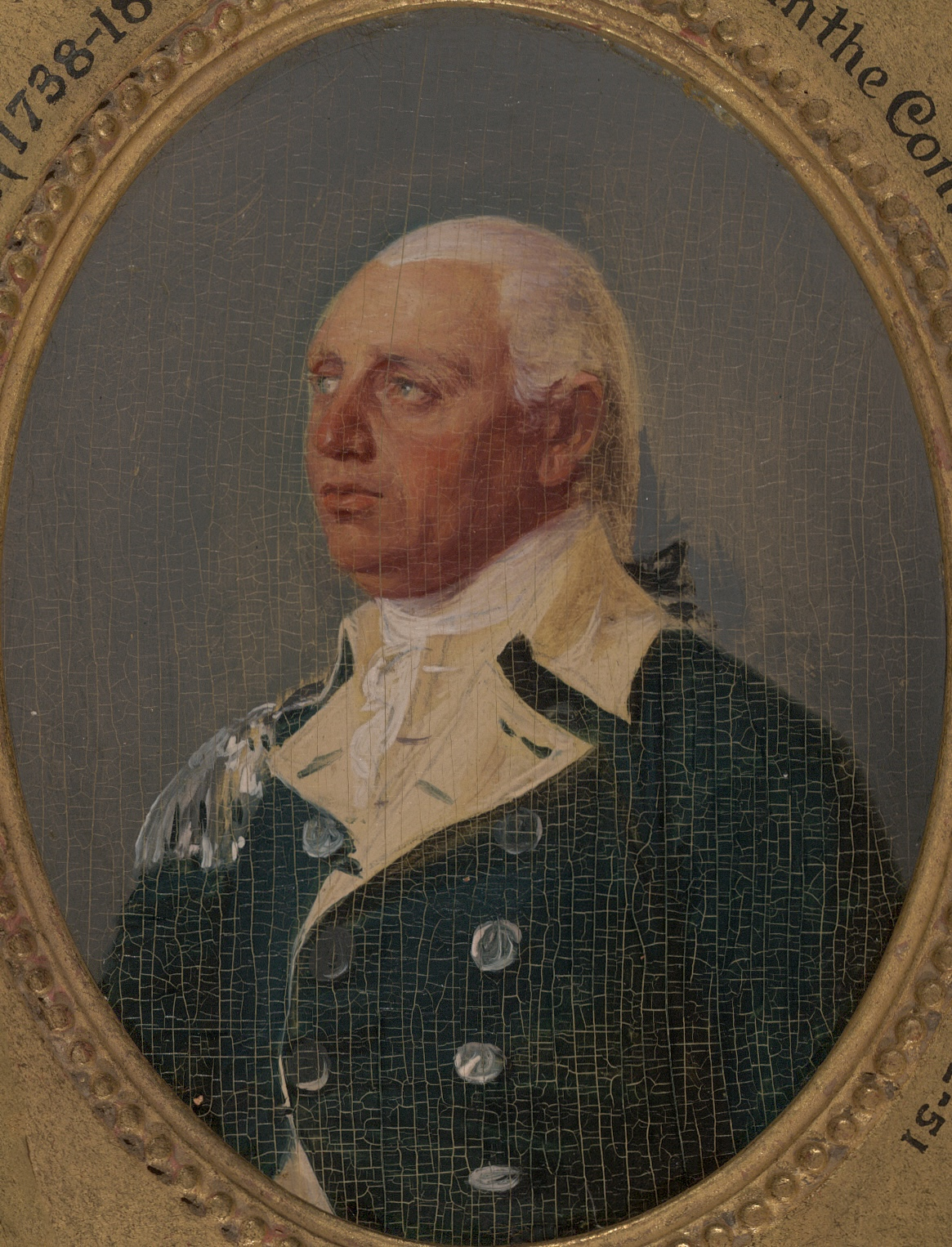
Rufus Putnam

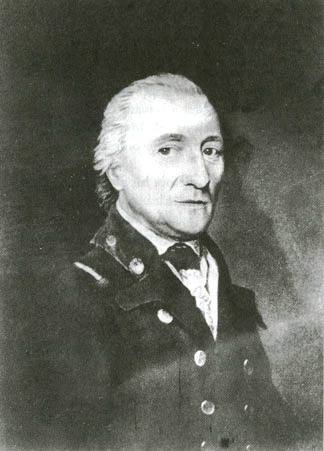
Gustave Rosenthal

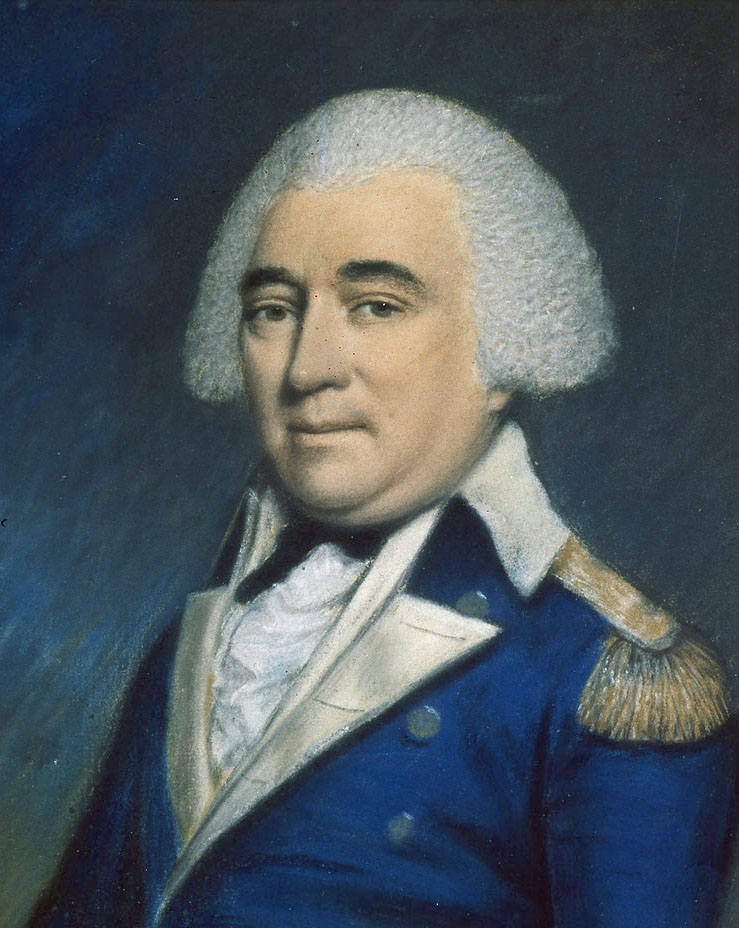
Anthony Wayne

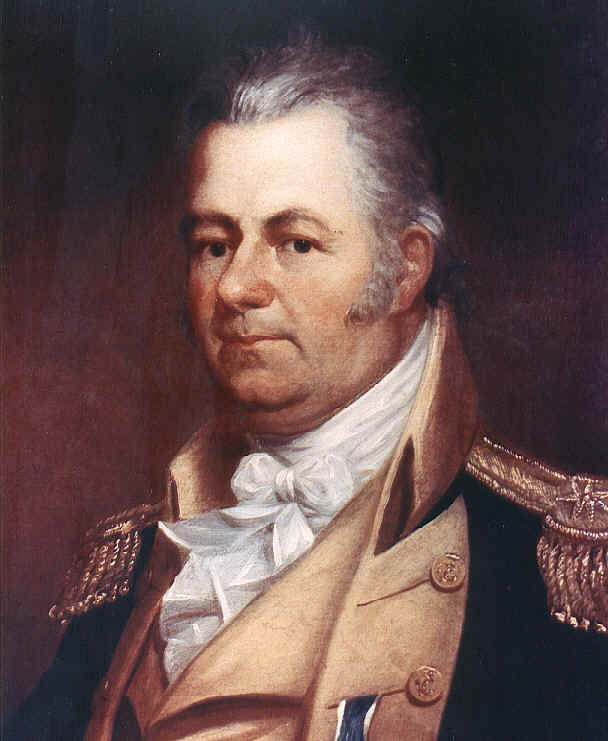
Thomas Truxtun

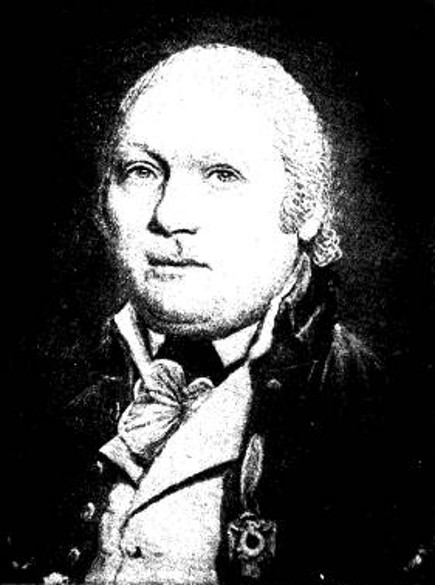
David Ziegler

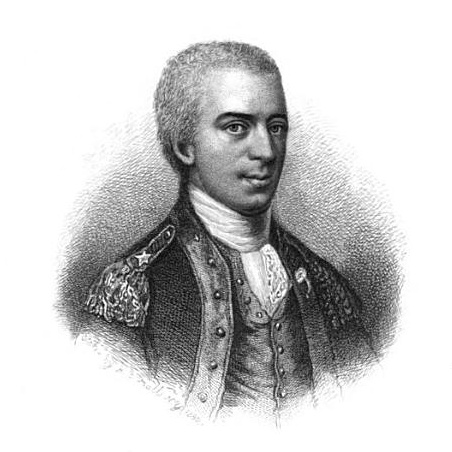
Samuel Blachley Webb

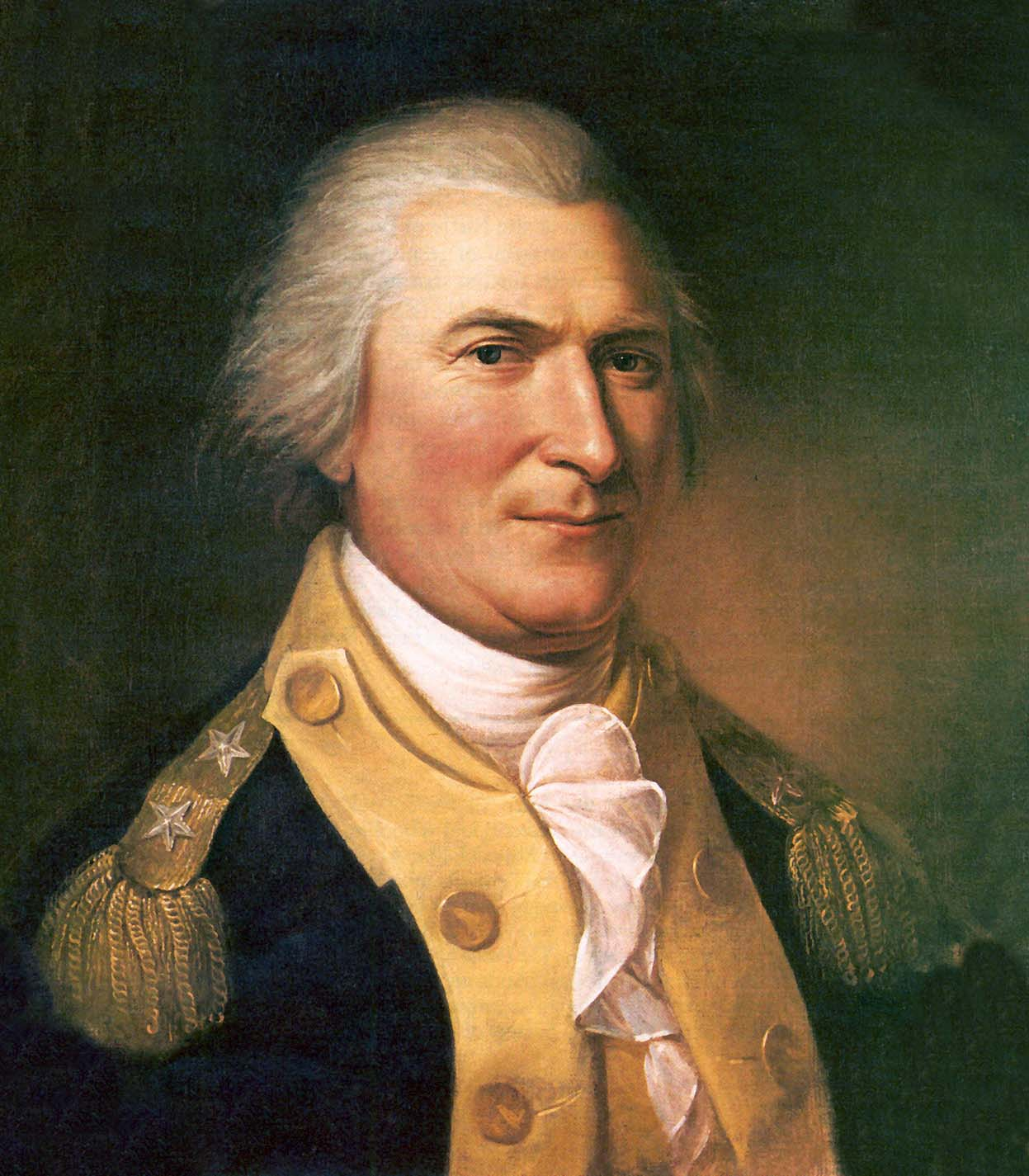
Arthur St. Clair

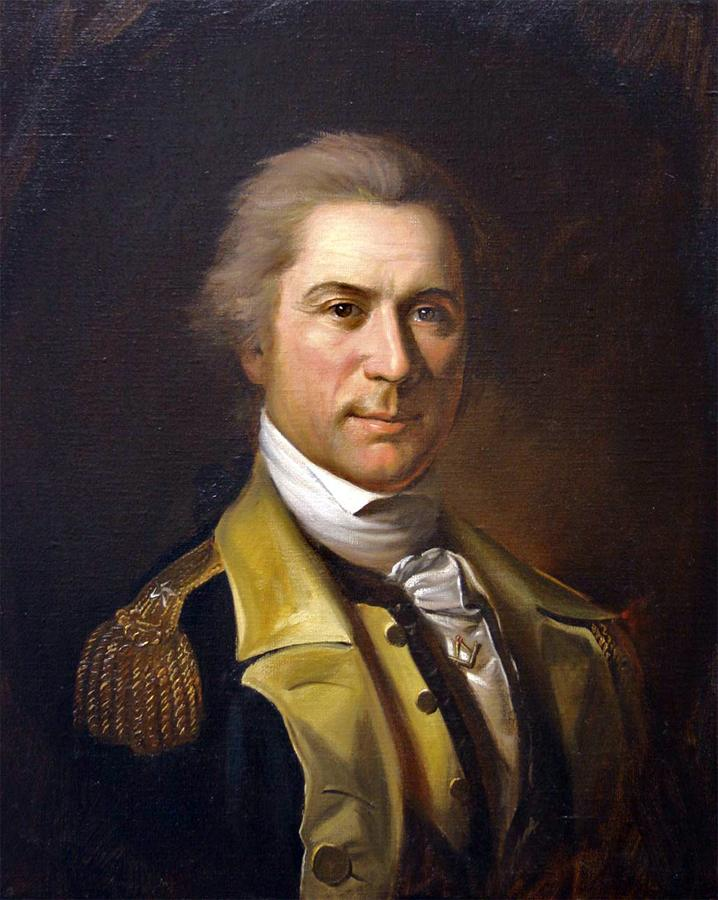
Otho Holland Williams

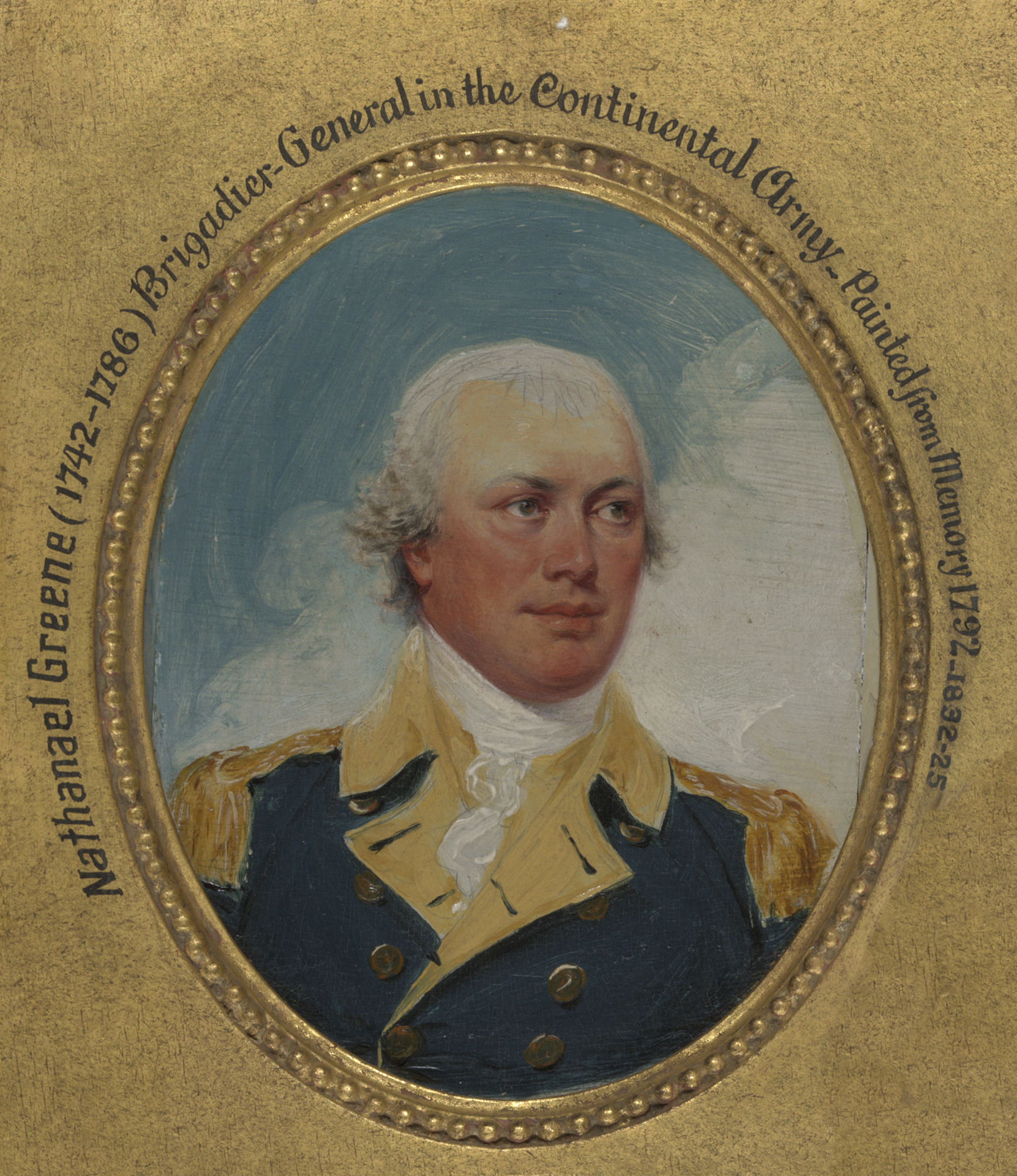
Nathanael Greene

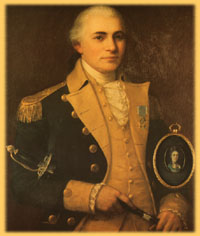
James Mitchel Varnum

Henry Knox

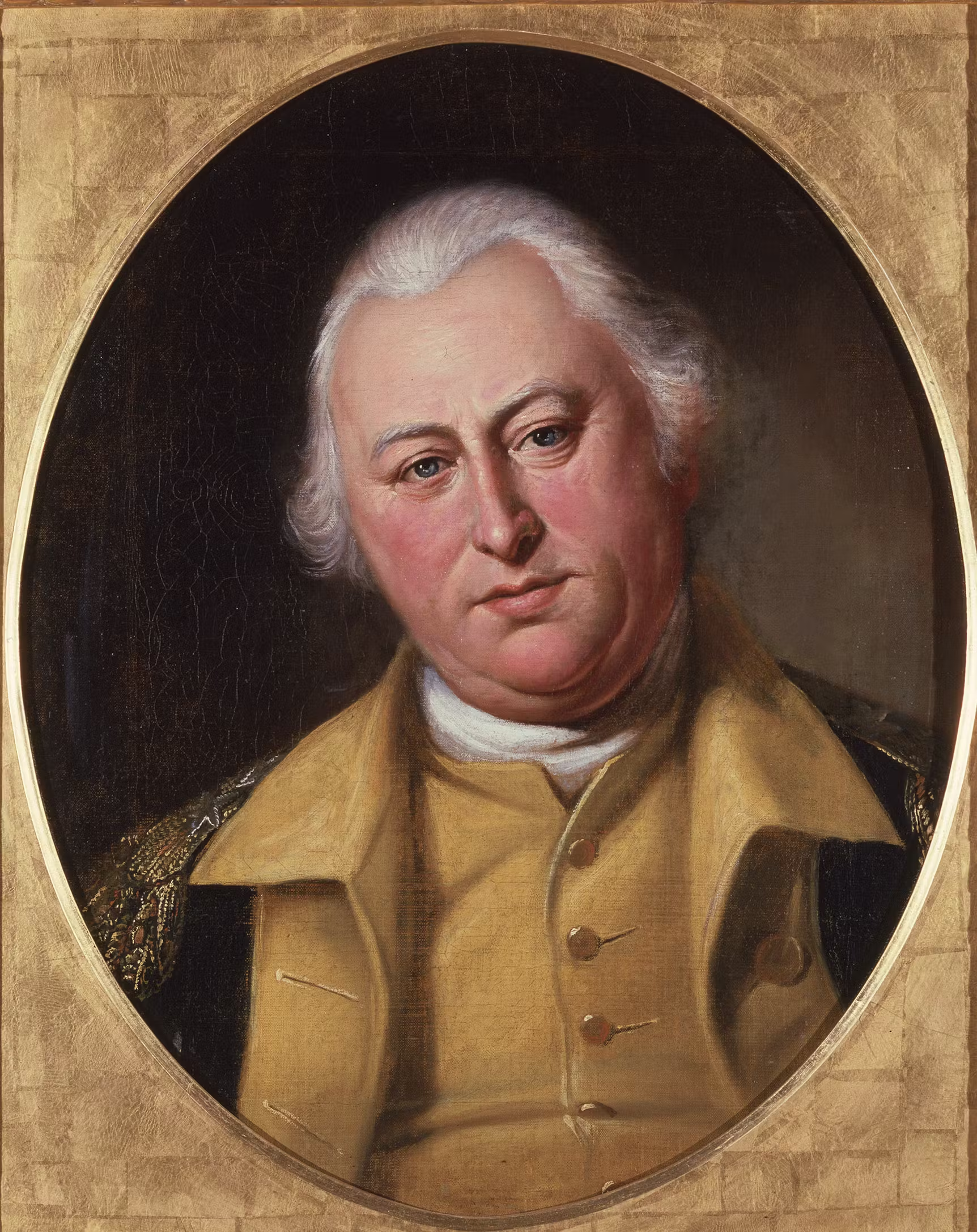
Benjamin Lincoln

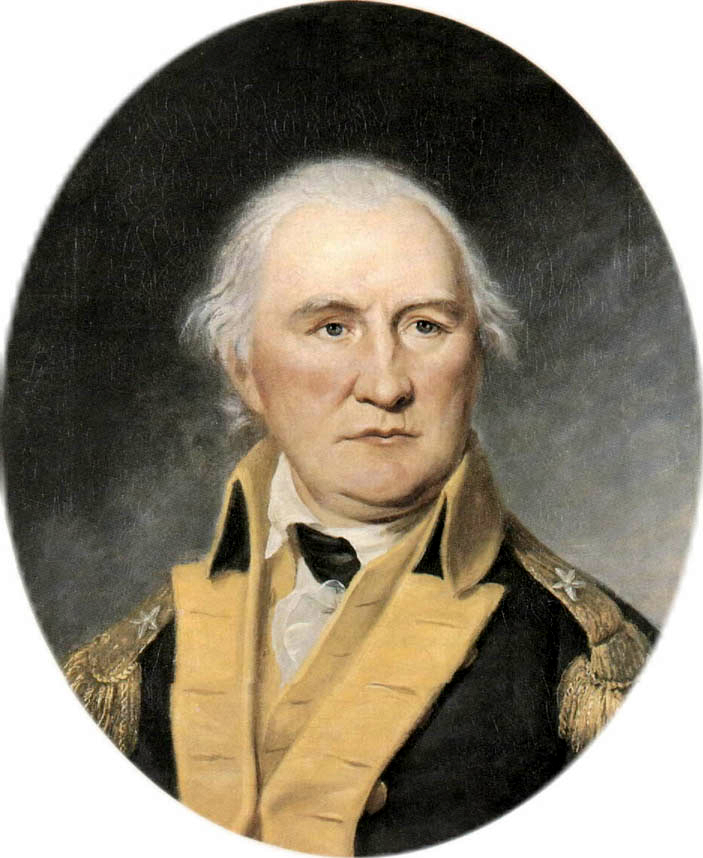
Daniel Morgan

Henry Lee III

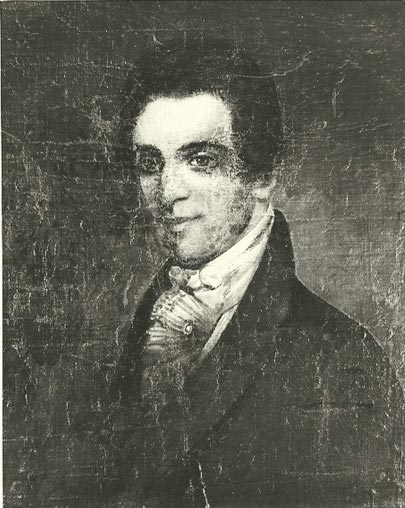
Francis Tennille

General Lachlan McIntosh

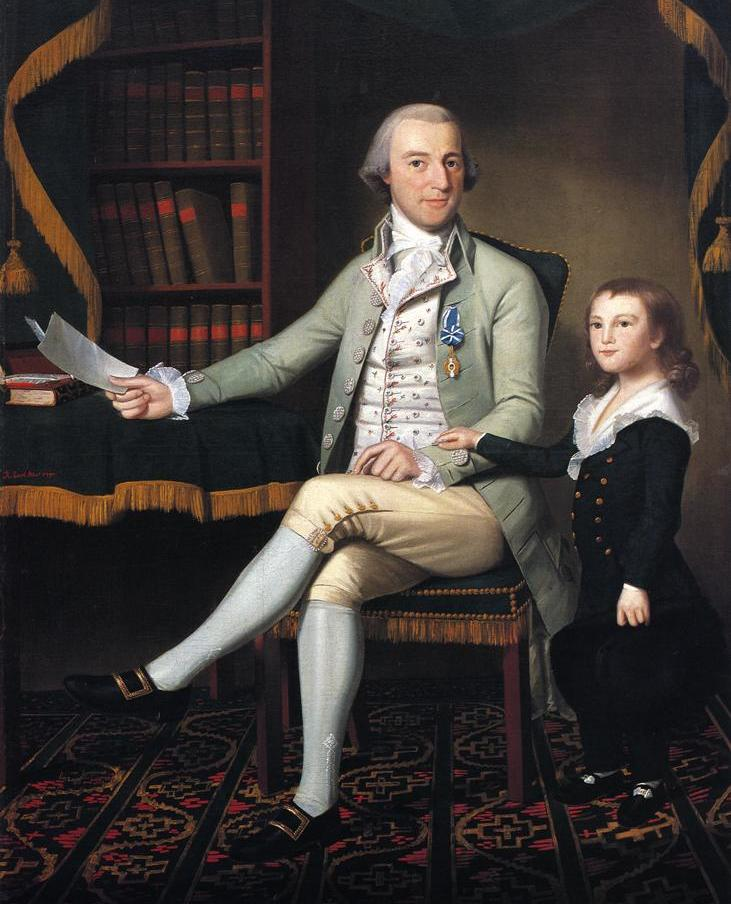
Benjamin Tallmadge

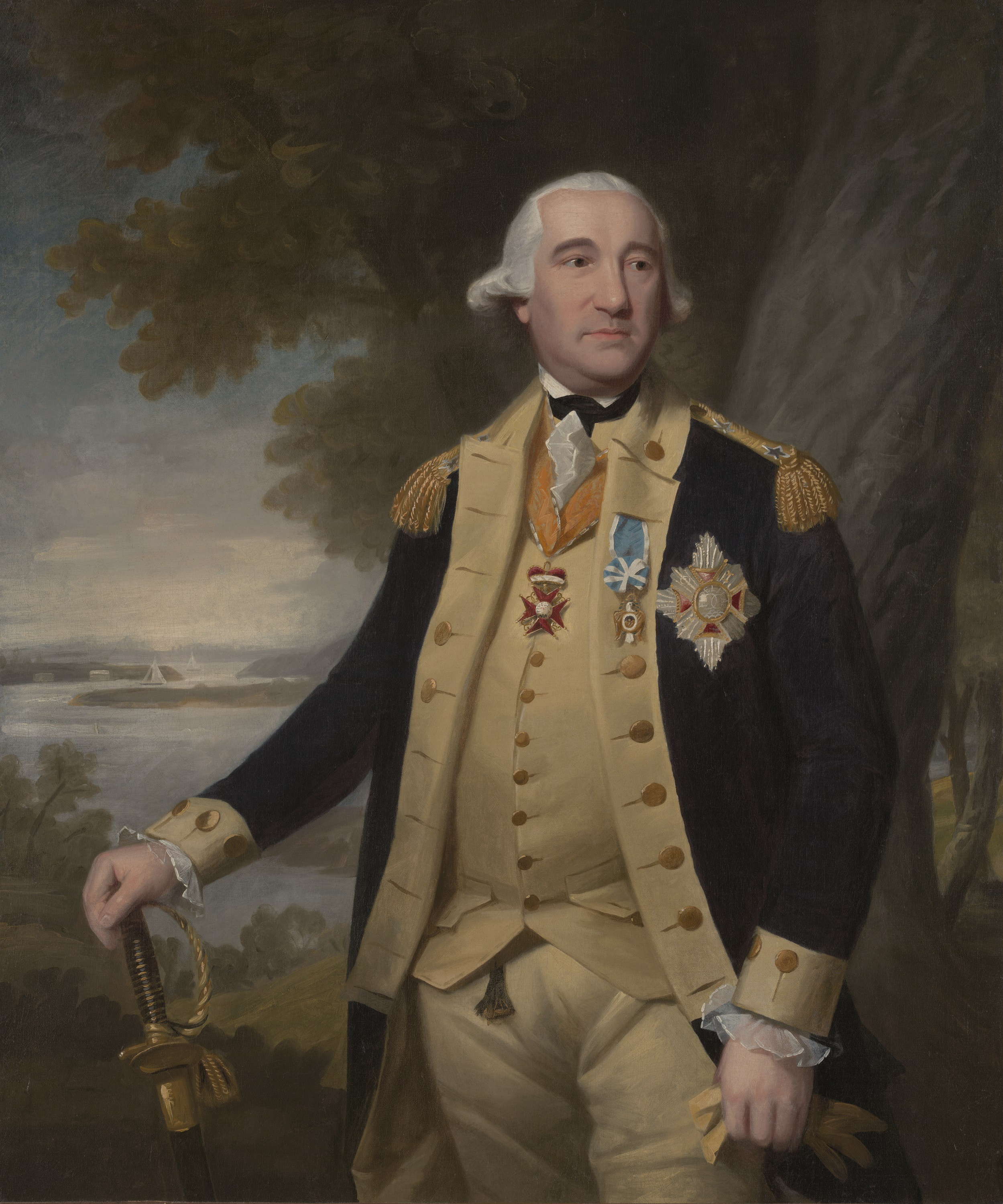
Major General von Steuben

Richard Varick

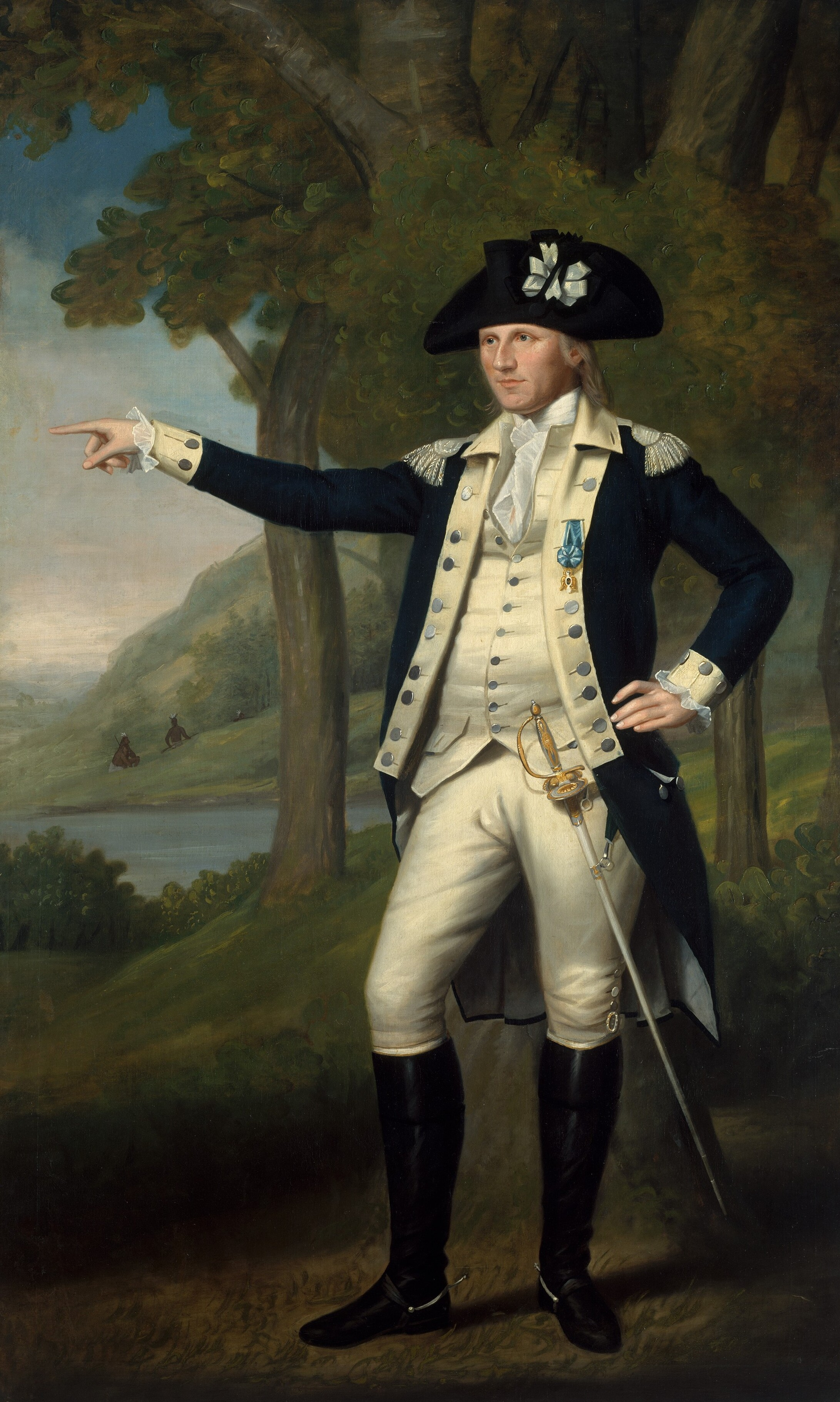
Marinus Willett

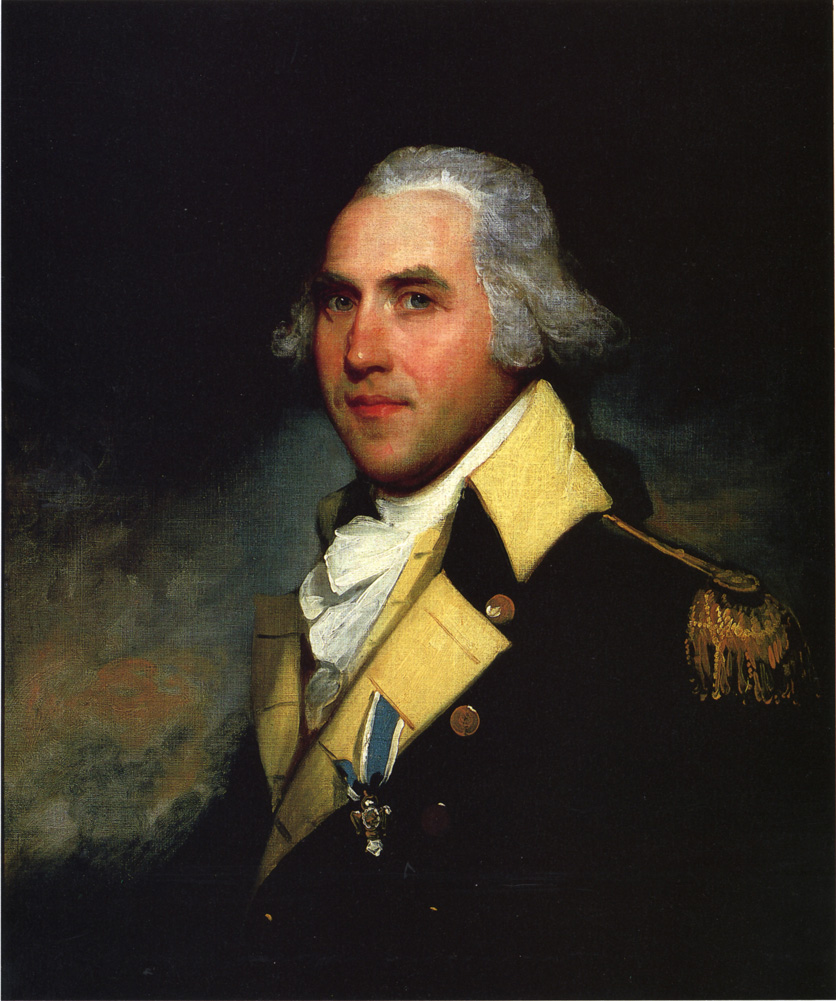
Peter Gansevoort, a 1794 oil painting by Gilbert Stuart

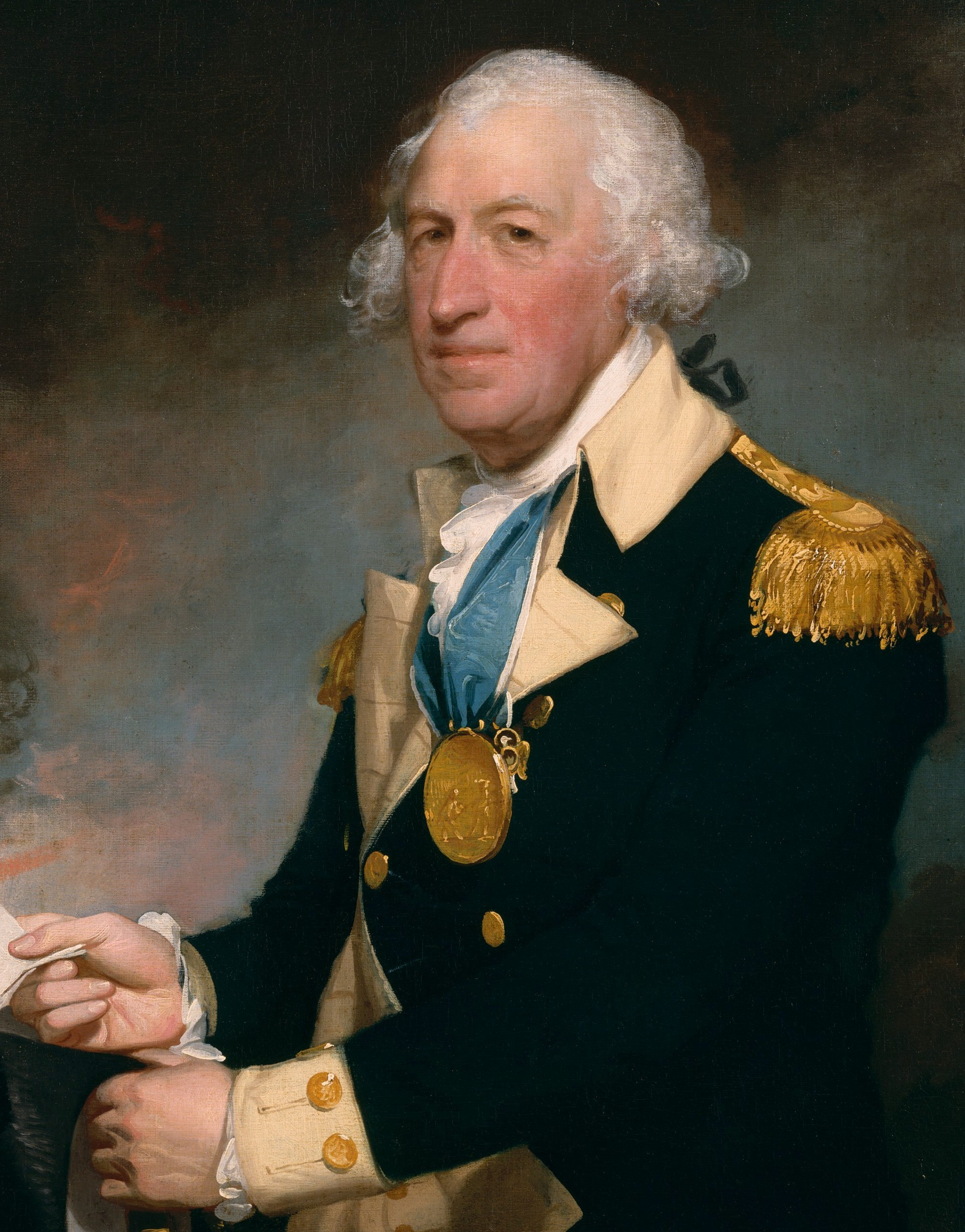
Horatio Gates, a 1794 painting by Gilbert Stuart

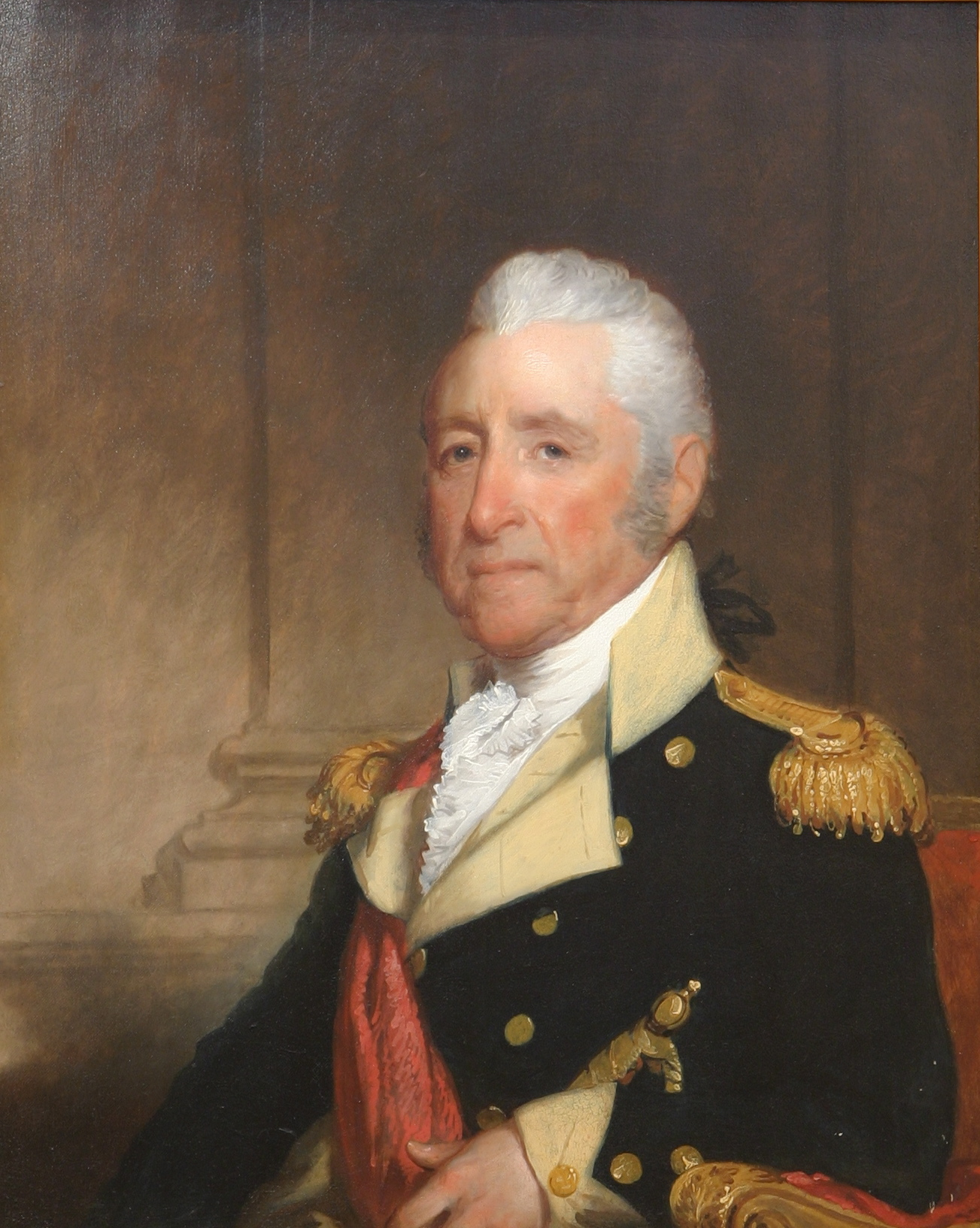
John Brooks, an 1820 painting by Gilbert Stuart

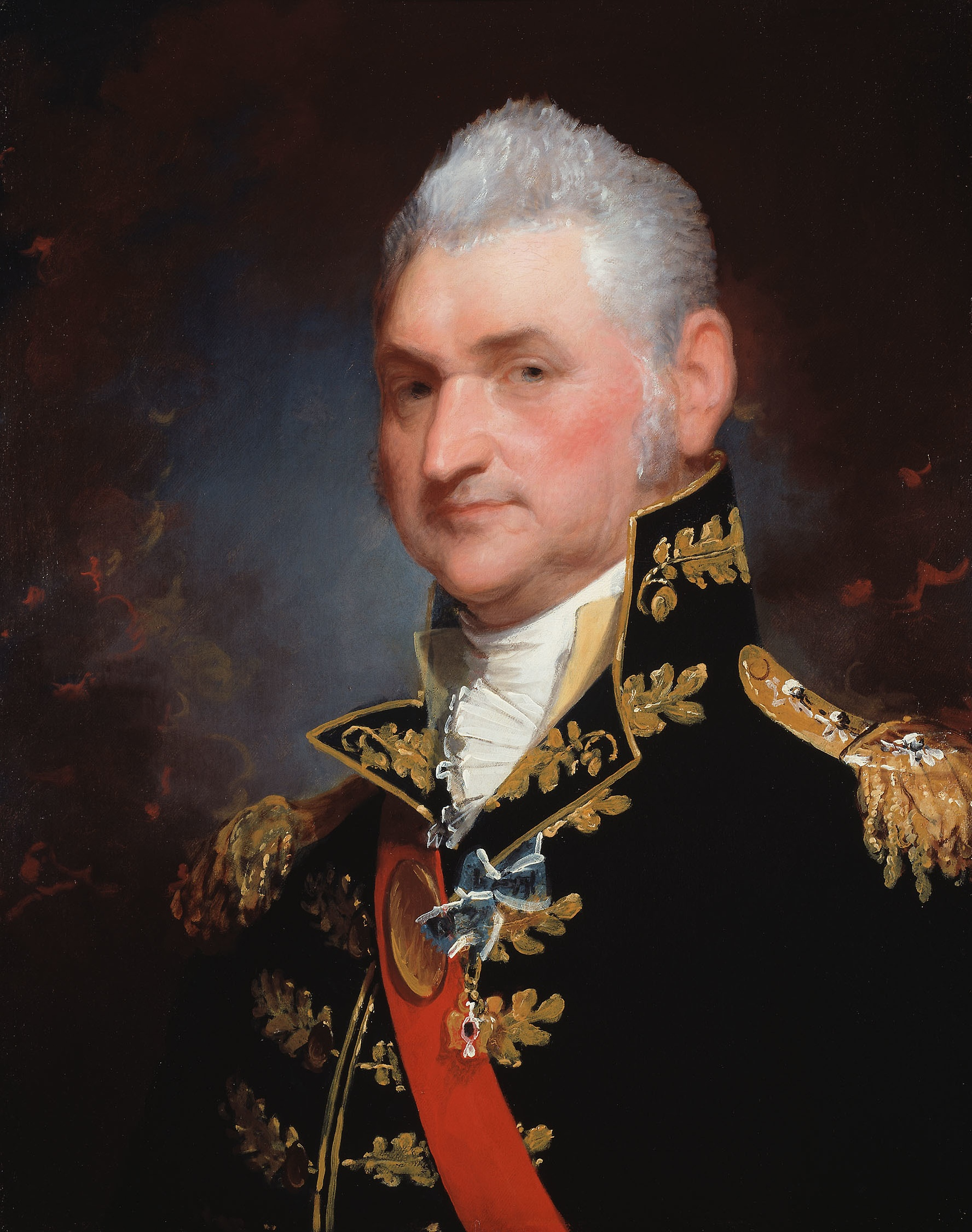
Henry Dearborn by Gilbert Stuart

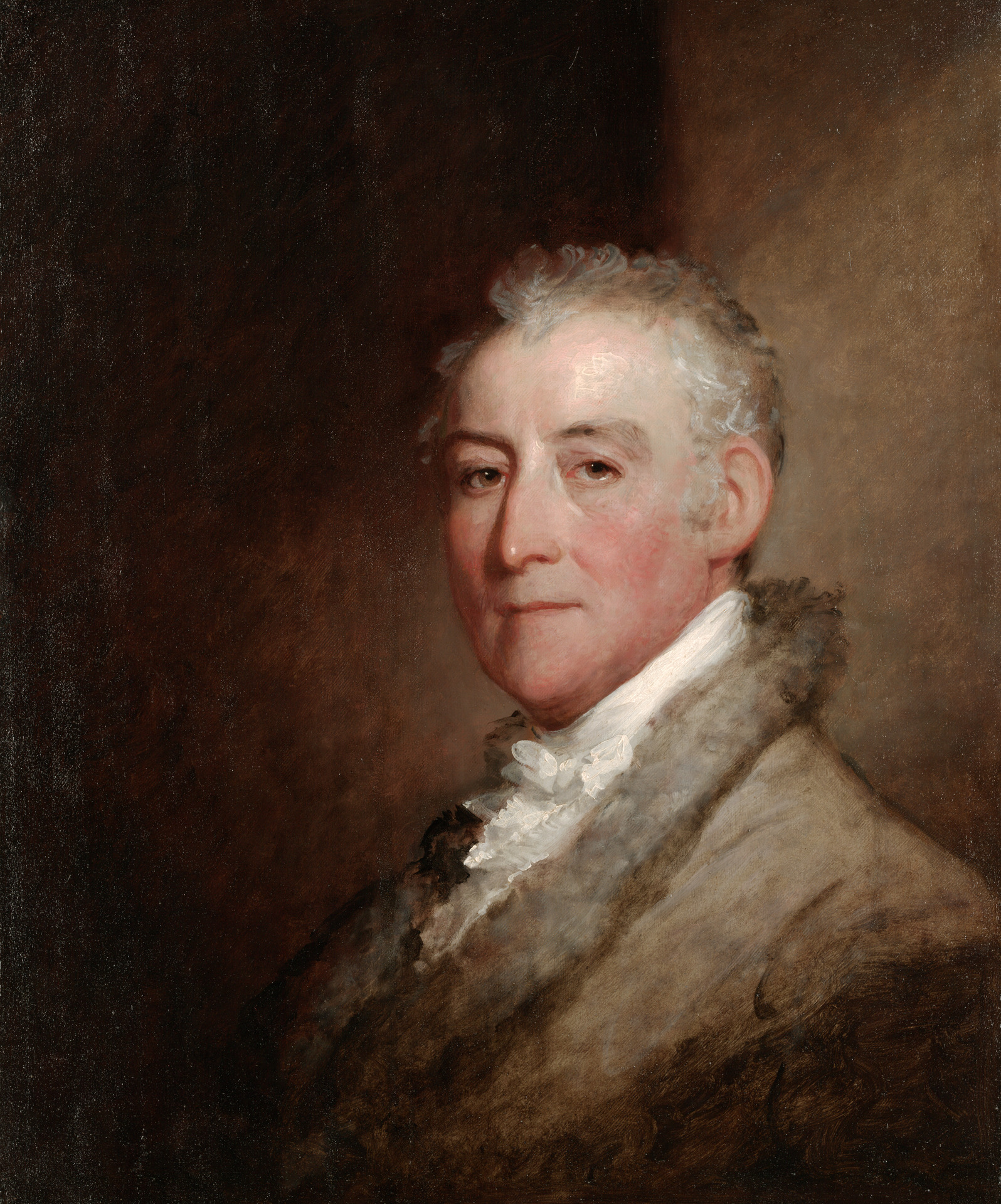
John Trumbull, an 1818 painting by Gilbert Stuart

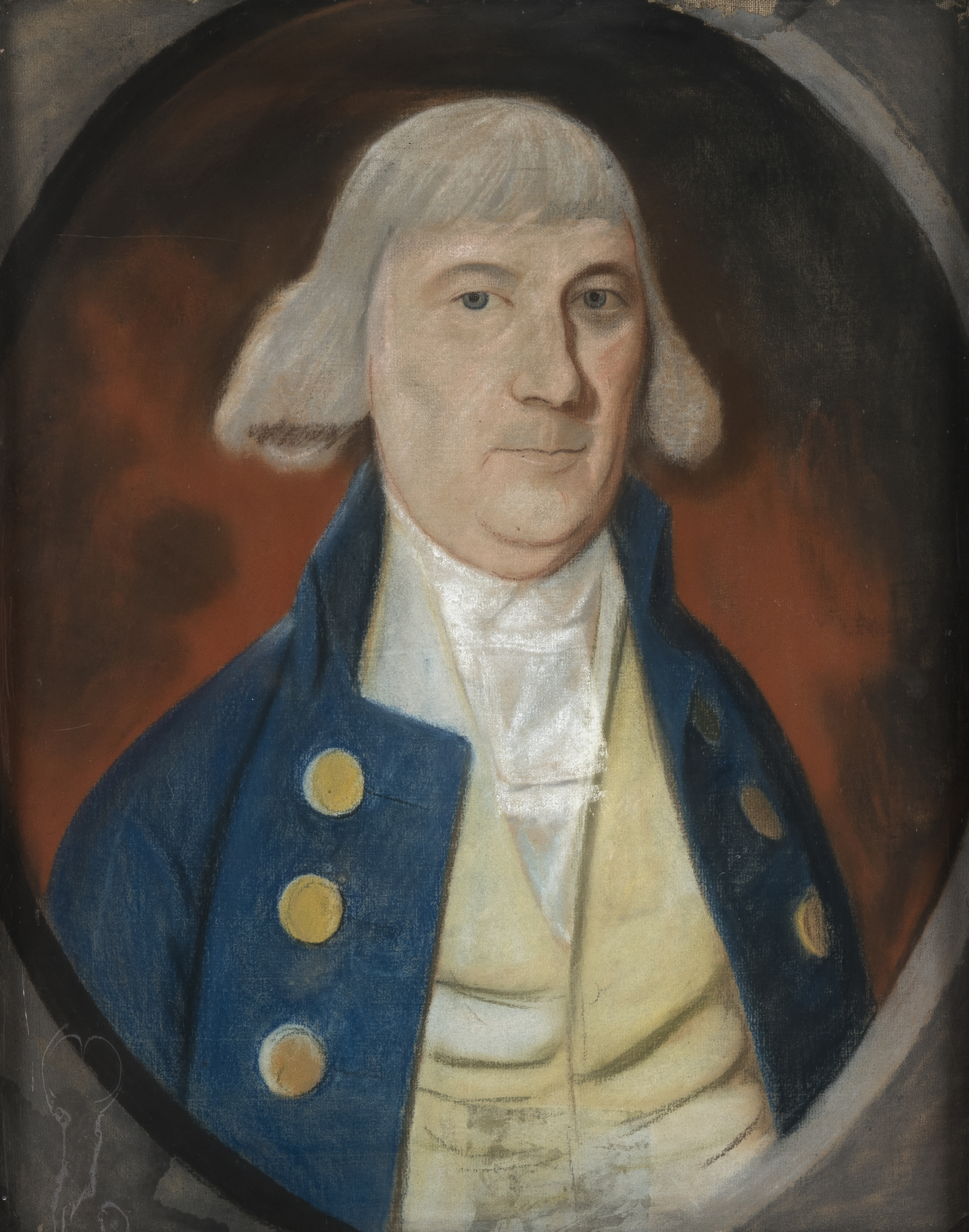
Colonel John Jameson

== Connecticut ==
Abraham Baldwin, Joel Barlow, Zebulon Butler, Henry Champion, John Chester, Jonathan Hart, David Humphreys, Ebenezer Huntington, Jedediah Huntington, Jacob Kingsbury, John Mansfield, Joseph Spencer, Heman Swift, Benjamin Tallmadge, Jonathan Trumbull, Jr., John Wyllys, Palgrave Wyllys, Amos Walbridge (major), Samuel B. Webb, Jeremiah West (Surgeon)

== Delaware ==
Daniel Jenifer Adams, Enoch Anderson, Joseph Anderson, Thomas Anderson, William Anderson, Caleb Prew Bennett, James Campbell, John Driskill, Henry Duff, Reuben Gilder, David Hall, Joseph Hossman, John Vance Hyatt, Peter Jacquett Jr., James Jones, Charles Kidd, David Kirkpatrick, Robert Henry Kirkwood, Henry Latimer, John Learmonth, William McKennan, Allen (Allan) McLane, Stephen McWilliam, Nathaniel Mitchell, George Monro, James Moore, John Patten, John Platt, Charles Pope, George Purvis, Edward Roche, Ebenezer Augustus Smith, James Tilton, Nathaniel Twinning, Joseph Vaughan, William Adams (son of Nathan Adams), and Joseph Haslet (son of John Haslet).

== Georgia ==
James Armstrong, Samuel Elbert, George Mathews, John Milton, Francis Tennille, John Berrien, 1787 —James Armstrong, John Berrien, Jacob Brice, Ichabod Burnett, John Burroughs, Chaplain Abraham Baldwin, William Brown, Richard Call, Alexander Daniel Cuthbert, Edward Cowan, Cornelius Collins, Emmanuel Pierre De la Plaigne, John Du Coins, Paul de la Baune D'Angely, Baron de Malves, Samuel Elbert, John Skey Eustace, Benjamin Fishbourne, Robert Forsyth, James Field, Surgeon Peter Fayssoux, Charles F. Fuhrer, James Gunn, Joseph Habersham, John Habersham, Arthur Hayes, Christopher Hillary, Chaplain John Holmes, Surgeon John Hunter, George Handley. 1786 — Hiwill 1784 — James Houstoun, Ebenezer Jackson, Ensign Charles Jackson, William Jordan, Denis L. Cottineau de Kerloguen, Philip Lowe, John Lucas, Benjamin Lloyd, Edward Lloyd, Lachlan McIntosh, John McIntosh, William McIntosh, Lachlan McIntosh Jr., George Matthews, John Martin, John Meanly, John Milton 1787. — James Meriwether. 1784. — Elisha Miller, Robert Munfort, Ferdinand O'Neal, Nathaniel Pearre, Nathaniel Pendleton, William Pierce. 1786. — Job. Pray, John Carroway Smith, Second Frederick Shirk, Surgeon James B. Sharpe. 1787. — John Sullivan, Francis Tennille, Surgeon Benjamin Tetard, Col. Richard Wylly, Edward White, John Peter Ward, John Peter Wagnon, Surgeon Goodwin Wilson Jr. The honorary members are Nicholas Anciaux, James Bulloch, Chev. Du Plessis, James Jackson, John Lucas. The following original members are now represented in the society: Joseph Habersham, John Habersham, George Handley, James Houstoun, Lachlan McIntosh, Frederick Shirk, Richard Wylly, John McIntosh, William McIntosh, Lachlan McIntosh Jr., John Milton, John Carroway Smith, Francis Tennille, Edward White

== Maryland ==
Lloyd Beall, Joshua Burgess, John H. Stone, Samuel Smith, William Lynch Lamar, Josias Carvel Hall, John Eager Howard, Mordecai Gist, James Craik, John Gunby, James Peale, Moses Rawlings, Thomas Lancaster Lansdale, James Lingan, Levin Winder, Nathaniel Ramsey, William Smallwood, Tench Tilghman, Otho Holland Williams, Richard Pindell (surgeon), Thomas Hussey Luckett.

Further list from Saffell:

John Eccleston, John Nicholson, Henry Hardman, John Davidson, William D. Beall, William Brown, John Cotes, Richard Dorsey, David Morrow, Ezekiel Hayne, Thomas Boyd, Samuel Morrow, James Armstrong, Thomas Mason, Samuel McPherson, Henry Baldwin, James Bracco, John Hamilton, William Campbell, George Hamilton, John L. Elbert, Nicholas Ricketts, David Hopkins, Basil Burgess, Thomas Price, James Smith, Jonathan Morris, Edward Hall, Isaac Rawlings, Edward OJdham, William Reily, John Kilty, John Jordan, Perry Benson, Michael Boyer, John J. Jacobs, Edward Dyer, Philip Reed, Samuel Hanson, Arthur Harris, Samuel B. Beall, Edward Spurrier, John Brevitt, William Pendergast, Thomas Rouse, William Kilty, Francis Revelly, Thomas Bealty, Mark McPherson, Henry Gaither, John Sears, Christopher Richmond, Edward Compton, Samuel F. Keene, John Sprigg Belt, John Hughes, Benjamin Price, James Bruff, William Bruce, Elisha Harrison, Adamson Tannehill, John D. Carey, James Mann, John Gassaway, Thomas A. Dyson, Henry Clements, Samuel Edrniston, John T. Lowe, William Smoote, Elihu Hall, Malachi Bonham, Hezekiah Ford, Gerard Wood, Henry H. Chapman, Isaac Hanson, Benjamin Fickle, Richard Anderson, John Smith, James W. Gray, John Mitchell, Nathan Wright, William Goldsborough, Walter Muse, James Baques, Clement Skerrett, Henry Gassaway, Bobert Gerry, Edward Pratt, Horatio Clagett, John Swan, Rezin Davis, James McFadon, Mountjoy Bailey, Paul Bentalou, John Carlisle, Archibald McAllister, John Gale, Eichard Waters, George Handy, John Trueman, Gassaway Watkins, Joseph Smith, Levin Denwood, Alexander Trueman, Joseph Cross, John Smith, James Somerville, Ebenezer Denny, James G. Heron, Daniel Jenifer, Richard Pindell, Jonathan Sellman, Walter Warfield, Thomas Woolford, Benjamin Brooks, Lilburn W. Williams, James Ewing, Eichard Chiderson, James Winchester, Samuel T. Wright, George Winchester, David Luckett, Osborn Williams, John Lynn, Joshua Rutledge, Philip Hill, Peregrine Fitzhugh, John Lynch.

== Massachusetts ==
Stephen Abbot, Jeduthan Baldwin, John Brooks, Henry Burbeck, David Cobb, John Crane, Thomas Humphrey Cushing, William Eustis, Constant Freeman, John Greaton, Africa Hamlin, William Heath, William Hull, Thomas Hunt, Henry Knox, Henry Jackson, Michael Jackson, Simon Larned, Benjamin Lincoln, Samuel Nicholson, William North, Alexander Oliver, Rufus Putnam, William Shepard, William Stacy, Benjamin Tupper, Elisha Horton, Abraham Williams, John Yeomans, Dr. Abijah Richardson.

Josiah Abbot, Stephen Abbot, Henry Adams, Judah Alden, Nathaniel Allen, Noah Allen, Jotham Ames, William Andrews, Samuel Armstrong, Moses Ashley, John Austin, Adams Bailey, Luther Bailey, Joseph Balcom, Jeduthan Baldwin, Ebenezer Ballantine, William Hudson Ballard, James Bancroft, Joel Barlow, Barachiah Bassett, Joseph Bates, Louis Bury de Bellerive, Hodijah Baylies, Joshua Benson Jr., Edward Blake Jr., John Blanchard, Caleb Blodget, Ralph Hart Bowles, Samuel Bowman, Andrew Bradford, Gamaliel Bradford, Gamaliel Bradford II, Robert Bradford, Joshua Bramhall, Origin Brigham, John Brooks, Ebenezer Brown, Oliver Brown, Edward Bugbee, Asa Bullard, Henry Burbeck, John Burnam, Isaiah Bussey

OM Callender, John, Capt. Lt. 3rd Reg. Cont. Artillery OM Carleton, Moses, Lt. 5th Reg. MCL OM Carleton, Osgood, 1st Lt. Corps of Invalids – Quartermaster OM Castaing, Peter la Grace, (Pierre) 1st Lt. Aide-de-Camp to Gen. Duportail (Fr.) OM Chambers, Matthew, Capt. 6th Reg. MCL OM Chapin, Samuel, 1st Lt. 4th Reg. MCL OM Clap, Caleb, Capt. 4th Reg. MCL OM Clap, Joshua, Lt. 3rd Reg. MCL OM Clayes, Peter, Capt. 6th Reg. MCL OM Cobb, David, Lt. Col. 5th Reg. MCL OM Cogswell, Amos, Capt. 3rd Reg. MCL OM Cogswell, Samuel, 1st Lt. 4th Reg. MCL OM Cogswell, Thomas, Lt. Col. 15th Reg. MCL OM Condy, Thomas Hollis, 1st Lt. 4th Reg. MCL OM Cook, David, Capt. 3rd Reg. Cont. Artillery OM Cooper, Ezekiel, Capt. 2nd Reg. MCL OM Cooper, Samuel, 2nd Lt. 3rd Reg. Cont. Artillery OM Crane, John, Col. 3rd Reg. Cont. Artillery OM Crane, John, Surgeon 6th Reg. MCL OM Crocker, Joseph, Capt. 3rd Reg. MCL OM Crowley, Florence, 1st Lt. 3rd Reg. Cont. Artillery OM Cushing, Nathaniel, Brig., Maj. 1st Reg MCL OM Cushing, Thomas Humphrey, 1st Lt. 1st Reg. MCL OM Dana, Benjamin, 1st Lt. 13th Reg. MCL OM Danforth, Joshua, Lt. 2nd Reg. MCL OM Daniels, Japheth, Capt. 6th Reg. MCL OM Darby, Samuel, Maj. 8th Reg. MCL OM Davis, Ebenezer, Lt. 3rd Reg. MCL OM Davis, James, 2nd Lt. 3rd Reg. MCL OM Davis, John, Lt. 4th Reg. MCL OM Dean, Walter, Capt. 10th Reg. MCL OM Dix, Nathan, Capt. 3rd Reg. MCL OM Dodge, Levi, 2nd Lt. 1st Reg. MCL OM Dolliver, Peter, Capt. Jackson's Additional Cont. Reg. OM Donnell, Nathaniel, Capt. 3rd Reg. Cont. Artillery OM Drew, Seth, Maj. App Out 3rd Reg. MCL OM Duffield, John, Surgeon 3rd Reg. Cont. Artillery OM Eaton, Benjamin, 2nd Lt. 3rd Reg. Cont. Artillery OM Edwards, Thomas, Lt. 2nd Reg. MCL OM Egleston, Azariah, Lt. 1st Reg. MCL OM Emerson, Nehemiah, Capt. [S] 10th Reg. MCL OM Emery, Ephraim, Lt. 6th Reg. MCL OM Eustis, William, Hosp. Surgeon Hospital Dept. OM Everett, Pelatiah, 1st Lt. 1st Reg. MCL OM Eysandeau, William [Guillaume], Lt. 3rd Reg. MCL [Fr?] OM Felt, Jonathan, Capt. * 7th Reg. MCL OM Fernald, Tobias, Lt. Col. 10th Reg. MCL OM Finley, James Edward Burr, Surgeon 4th Reg. MCL OM Finley, Samuel, Jr., Surgeon 7th Reg. MCL OM Fisk, Joseph, Surgeon 1st Reg. MCL OM Floyd, Ebenezer, Ens. 1st Reg. MCL OM Foster, Elisha, Ens. 2nd Reg. MCL OM Foster, Thomas, Lt. 8th Reg. MCL OM Fowle, John, Capt. 3rd Reg. MCL OM Freeman, Constant, Capt. Lt. 3rd Reg. Cont. Artillery OM Freeman, Thomas Davis, Lt. 7th Reg. MCL OM Frink, Samuel, Ens. 4th Reg. MCL OM Frost, Samuel, Capt. 6th Reg. MCL OM Frothingham, Benjamin, Capt. 3rd Reg. Cont. Artillery OM Frye, Frederick, Ens. 1st Reg. MCL OM Fuller, John, Capt. 4th Reg. MCL OM Gardner, James, Capt. Lt. 3rd Reg. Cont. Artillery OM Garret, Andrew, Lt. 6th Reg. MCL OM George, John, Capt. Lt. 3rd Reg. Cont. Artillery OM Gibbs, Caleb, Maj. 2nd Reg. MCL OM Gilbert, Benjamin, Lt. 3rd Reg. MCL OM Goodale, Nathan, Capt. 1st Reg. MCL OM Goodwin, Francis LeBaron, Surg. Mate 3rd Reg. MCL OM Greaton, John, Brig. Gen. Cont. Army OM Greaton, John Wheelwright, Ens. 3rd Reg. MCL OM Greaton, Richard Humphrey, Ens. 3rd Reg. MCL OM Green, Francis, Capt. 1st Reg. MCL OM Greenleaf, William, 1st Lt. 8th Reg. MCL OM Gridley, John, Capt. Lt. 3rd Reg. Cont. Artillery OM Hall, James, Capt. Lt. 3rd Reg. Cont. Artillery OM Hamlin, Africa, Ens. 4th Reg. MCL OM Hancock, Belcher, Capt. 1st Reg. MCL OM Hart, John, Surgeon 2nd Reg. MCL OM Hartshorn, Thomas, Capt. 8th Reg. MCL OM Harvey, Elisha, Capt. Lt. 2nd Reg. Cont. Artillery OM Haskell, Elnathan, Brev. Maj. Jackson's Additional Cont. Reg. OM Haskell, Jonathan, Lt. 2nd Reg. MCL OM Hastings, John, Capt. 7th Reg. MCL OM Heath, William, Maj. Gen. Cont. Army OM Heywood, Benjamin, Capt. (Heyward) 6th Reg. MCL OM Hildreth, William, Lt. 8th Reg. MCL OM Hill, Jeremiah, 1st Lt. 2nd Reg. MCL OM Hinds, Bartlett, Capt. 10th Reg. MCL OM Hiwell, John, 1st Lt. 3rd Reg. Cont. Artillery OM Hobby, John, Capt. 3rd Reg. MCL OM Holbrook, David, Capt. 4th Reg. MCL OM Holden, Aaron, 1st Lt. 7th Reg. MCL OM Holden, Abel, Capt. 6th Reg. MCL OM Holden, John, Jr., 1st Lt. 2nd Reg. MCL OM Holden, Levi, 1st Lt. 6th Reg. MCL OM Holland, Ivory, 1st Lt. 5th Reg. MCL OM Holland, Park, Lt. 5th Reg. MCL OM Hollister, Jesse, Capt. 4th Reg. MCL OM Homans, John, Surg. 2nd Reg. Cont. Dragoons OM Homans, John, Surg. [S] 2nd Reg. Cont. Dragoons OM Hooker, Zibeon, 1st Lt. 5th Reg. MCL OM Horton, Elisha, Ens. 12th Reg. MCL OM Houdin, Michael Gabriel, Capt. 2nd Reg. MCL OM Howe, Richard Surcomb, Ens. 4th Reg. MCL OM Hull, William, Lt. Col. 3rd Reg. MCL OM Hunt, Abraham, Capt. 1st Reg. MCL OM Hunt, Ephraim, 1st Lt. 4th Reg. MCL OM Hunt, Thomas, Capt. 3rd Reg. MCL OM Hurd, John, Jr., Ens. 2nd Reg. MCL OM Ingersoll, George, 1st Lt. 3rd Reg. Cont. Artillery OM Jackson, Amasa, Ens. 3rd Reg. MCL OM Jackson, Charles, Ens. 3rd Reg. MCL OM Jackson, Daniel, 1st Lt. 3rd Reg. Cont. Artillery OM Jackson, Ebenezer, 2nd Lt. 3rd Reg. Cont. Artillery OM Jackson, Henry, Col. 4th Reg. MCL OM Jackson, Michael Brevet Maj. Gen. 3rd Reg. MCL OM Jackson, Michael, 2nd Lt. 3rd Reg. MCL OM Jackson, Simon, Capt. Lt. 2nd Reg. MCL OM Jackson, Thomas, Capt. 3rd Reg. Cont. Artillery OM Jefferds, Samuel, 1st Lt. 3rd Reg. Cont. Artillery OM Johnston, John, Capt. Lt. Knox's Artillery OM Killam, Joseph, Capt. 1st Reg. MCL OM King, Zebulon, Capt. 4th Reg. MCL OM Knapp, Moses, Maj. 5th Reg. MCL OM Knowles, Charles, Capt., Lt. 3rd Reg. Cont. Artillery OM Knox, Henry, Maj. Gen Cont. Army OM Larned, Simon, Capt. Aide-de-Camp to General Glover OM Laughton, William (Lawton), Surg. Mate 5th Reg. MCL OM Leavenworth, Nathaniel, Surg. Mate 2nd Reg. MCL OM Lee, Daniel, Capt. 3rd Reg. MCL OM Lee, William Raymond, Col. Lee's Additional Cont. Reg. OM Leland, Joseph, 1st Lt. * 8th Reg. MCL OM Leonard, Jacob, Ens. 2nd Reg. MCL OM Leverett, William, Lt. Jackson's Additional Cont. Reg. OM Lillie, John, Brev. Maj. Aide-de-Camp to General Knox OM Lincoln, Benjamin, Maj. Gen. Cont. Army OM Lincoln, Rufus, Capt. 7th Reg. MCL OM Liswell, John, 2nd Lt. 3rd Reg. Cont. Artillery OM Lithgow, William, Maj. 11th Reg. MCL OM Lockwood, William, Brig. Chap. 1st Massachusetts Cont. Brigade OM Lord, Jeremiah, Ens. 2nd Reg. MCL OM Lovell, James, Ens. Lee's Battalion of Light Dragoons OM Lunt, Daniel, Capt. 1st Reg. MCL OM Lyman, Cornelius, Ens. 2nd Reg. MCL OM Marble, Henry, 2nd Lt. 5th Reg. MCL OM Mason, David, Jr., Lt. 3rd Reg. Cont. Artillery OM Maxwell, Hugh, Lt. Col. 3rd Reg. MCL OM Maynard, John, Lt. 3rd Reg. MCL OM Maynard, Jonathan, Capt. 7th Reg. MCL OM Maynard, William, Lt. Corps of Invalids – wounded at Bunker Hill OM McCay [M’Cay], Daniel, Ens. 1st Reg. MCL OM McKendry, William, 2nd Lt. 4th Reg. MCL OM Means, James, Capt. 2nd Reg. MCL OM Mellish, Samuel, 1st Lt. 3rd Reg. MCL OM Miller, Jeremiah, Capt. 1st Reg. MCL OM Miller, Joseph, 2nd Lt. 6th Reg. MCL OM Mills, John, Capt. 1st Reg. MCL OM Mills, William, Capt. 4th Reg. MCL OM Mooers, Benjamin, Lt. 2nd Canadian Cont. Reg. OM Moor, William, 1st Lt. 3rd Reg. Cont. Artillery OM Moore, William, Capt. 4th Reg. MCL OM Morgan, Benjamin, Surg. Mate 1st Reg. MCL OM Morrill, Amos, Maj. Reid's New Hampshire Cont. Battalion OM Morton, Silas, 1st Lt. 2nd Reg. MCL OM Myrick, Samuel, 2nd Lt. * 2nd Reg. MCL OM Nason, Nathaniel, 1st Lt. 1st Reg. MCL OM Nelson, Henry, Lt. 3rd Reg. MCL OM Newhall, Ezra, Lt. Col. 4th Reg. MCL OM Newman, Samuel, Lt. Cont. Navy OM Nicholson, Samuel, Capt. Cont. Navy OM Nixon, Thomas, Col. 6th Reg. MCL OM North, William, Capt. Aide-de-Camp to General Steuben OM Oliver, Alexander, Ens. 5th Reg. MCL OM Robert Oliver, Maj. 2nd Reg. MCL OM Pardee, Aaron, 2nd Lt. 3rd Reg. Cont. Artillery OM Parker, Benjamin, 1st Lt. 9th Reg. MCL OM Parker, Elias J., 1st Lt. 1st Reg. MCL OM Paterson, John Brig. Gen. Cont. Army OM Peabody, Ebenezer, 1st Lt. 7th Reg. MCL OM Peirce, John, Capt. 3rd Reg. Cont. Artillery OM Peirce, Silas, Capt. 8th Reg. MCL OM Perkins, William, Maj. 3rd Reg. Cont. Artillery OM Peters, Andrew, Lt. Col. 15th Reg. MCL OM Pettengill, Joseph, Maj. 1st Reg. MCL OM Phelon, Edward, Lt. Aide-de-Camp to General Rufus Putnam OM Phelon, John, 1st Lt. 3rd Reg. MCL OM Phelon, Patrick, 1st Lt. 3rd Reg. MCL OM Pickering, Timothy, Col. * Quartermaster General, Cont. Army OM Pierce, Benjamin, Lt. 1st Reg. MCL OM Pike, Benjamin, Capt. 6th Reg. MCL OM Pope, Isaac, Maj. 3rd Reg. MCL OM Popkin, John, Lt. Col. 3rd Reg. Cont. Artillery OM Porter, Benjamin Jones, Surg. Mate 4th Reg. MCL OM Pratt, Joel, Lt. * 4th Reg. MCL OM Pray, John, Capt. 1st Reg. MCL OM Prescott, Joseph, Surg. Mate Hospital Dept. OM Price, William, 1st Lt. 3rd Reg. Cont. Artillery OM Putnam, Rufus, Brig. Gen. Cont. Army OM Randall, Thomas, Capt. 3rd Reg. Cont. Artillery OM Rawson, Jeduthan, Ens. 2nd Reg. MCL OM Reab, George, Lt. 4th Reg. MCL OM Remich, Timothy, Maj. 1st Reg. MCL – Brigade Major OM Remich, Timothy, Maj. [S] 1st Reg. MCL – Brigade Major OM Rice, Nathan, Maj. 4th Reg. MCL OM Rice, Oliver, Lt. 4th Reg. MCL OM Richardson, Abijah, Surg. 5th Reg. MCL OM Rickard, William, Lt. 4th Reg. MCL OM Ripley, Hezekiah, 1st Lt. 2nd Reg. MCL OM Roberts, Richard Brooke, Capt. Aide-de-Camp to General Lincoln OM Rouse, Oliver, Capt. [Brevet] 12th Reg. MCL OM Rowe, John, Ens. 8th Reg. MCL OM Sampson, Crocker, 1st Lt. 7th Reg. MCL OM Sargent, Winthrop, Capt. Aide-de-Camp to General Howe OM Satterlee, William, Capt. 2nd Canadian Cont. Reg. OM Savage, Henry, 1st Lt. Aide-de-Camp to General Nixon OM Savage, Joseph, Capt. 2nd Reg. Cont. Artillery OM Sawyer, James, Ens. 8th Reg. MCL OM Scammell, Samuel Leslie, Ens. 2nd Reg. MCL OM Scott, James Miles, Ens. 4th Reg. MCL OM Selden, Charles, 1st Lt. 9th Reg. MCL OM Sever, James, Ens. 7th Reg. MCL OM Sewall, Henry, Capt. 2nd Reg. MCL OM Seward, Thomas, Capt. 3rd Reg. Cont. Artillery OM Shaw, Samuel, Capt. Aide-de-Camp to General Knox OM Shepard, William Jr., Ens. * 4th Reg. MCL OM Shepard, William, Col. App Out 4th Reg. MCL OM Shute, Daniel, Surg. 4th Reg. MCL OM Smith, Ebenezer, Capt. 8th Reg. MCL [d. 1824] OM Smith, Ebenezer, Capt. 2nd Reg. MCL [d. 1816] OM Smith, John Kilby, Capt. 6th Reg. MCL OM Smith, Joseph, 1st Lt. 5th Reg. MCL OM Smith, Josiah, Lt. 6th Reg. MCL OM Smith, Silvanus, Capt. 5th Reg. MCL OM Smith, Simeon, Capt. Warner's Additional Cont. Reg. OM Spring, Simeon, 1st Lt. 4th Reg. MCL OM Sprout, Ebenezer, Lt. Col. 2nd Reg. MCL OM Stacy, William, Lt. Col. 4th Reg. MCL OM Stafford, John Roosevelt, Ens. 3rd Reg. MCL OM Stevens, William, Capt. Cont. Artillery OM Stocker, Ebenezer, 2nd Lt. 3rd Reg. MCL OM Stone, Jonathan, Capt. 5th Reg. MCL OM Stone, Nathaniel, 1st Lt. 1st Reg. MCL OM Storer, Ebenezer, Lt. 2nd Reg. MCL OM Storey, William, Capt. 8th Reg. MCL OM Story, John, Lt. Col. Aide-de-Camp to General Alexander OM Sumner, Job, Maj. (John) 3rd Reg. MCL OM Swan, Caleb, Ens. 8th Reg, MCL OM Taylor, Jr., Othniel, Capt. 10th Reg. MCL OM Taylor, Tertius, 2nd Lt. 1st Reg. MCL OM Taylor, William, 1st Lt. 2nd Reg. MCL OM Thacher, James, Surg. 9th Reg. MCL OM Thacher, Nathaniel, Lt. 5th Reg. MCL OM Thomas, John, Surgeon 3rd Reg. MCL OM Thomas, Joseph, Capt. 2nd Reg. Cont. Artillery OM Thompson, Thaddeus, Surg. 6th Reg. MCL OM Tisdale, James, Capt. * 3rd Reg. MCL OM Torrey, William, 1st Lt. 2nd Reg. MCL [d. 1828] OM Torrey, William, 2nd Lt. 2nd Canadian (Hazen's) Reg. [1831] OM Town, Jacob, Lt. 2nd Reg. MCL OM Townsend, David, Surg. General Hospital Dept. OM Treadwell, William, Capt. 3rd Reg. Cont. Artillery OM Trescott, Lemuel, Maj. 7th Reg. MCL OM Trotter, John, Capt. Aide-de-Camp to General Rufus Putnam OM Trowbridge, Luther, 1st Lt. 7th Reg. MCL OM Tucker, Joseph, Lt. 7th Reg. MCL OM Tucker, Samuel, Capt. Cont. Navy OM Tudor, William, Lt. Col. Judge Advocate General, Cont. Army OM Tupper, Anselm, Lt. 6th Reg. MCL OM Tupper, Benjamin, Col. 6th Reg. MCL OM Turner, Jonathan, Capt. 5th Reg. MCL OM Turner, Marlbry, Lt. 2nd Reg. MCL OM Turner, Peleg, 2nd Lt. 10th Reg. MCL OM Turner, Thomas, Capt. 7th Reg. MCL OM Vose, Elijah, Lt. Col. 1st Reg. MCL OM Vose, Joseph, Col. [Brev. Brig. Gen.] 1st Reg. MCL OM Vose, Thomas, Capt. 3rd Reg. Cont. Artillery OM Wales, Joseph, Lt. 6th Reg. MCL OM Walker, Edward, Lt. 4th Reg. MCL OM Walker, Robert, Capt. 2nd Reg. MCL OM Wardwell, Joseph, Ens. 1st Reg. MCL OM Warren, Adriel, 1st Lt. 1st Reg. MCL OM Warren, James, Jr., Lt. Cont. Navy OM Warren, John, Lt. 5th Reg. MCL OM Watson, William, Capt. 3rd Reg. MCL OM Wattles, Mason, Capt. 6th Reg. MCL OM Webb, George, Capt. 4th Reg. MCL OM Webber, Daniel, Lt. 2nd Reg. MCL OM Wellington, Elisha, 2nd Lt. 7th Reg. MCL OM Wells, Benjamin, Lt. 1st Reg. MCL OM Wells, James A., Lt. 4th Reg. MCL OM Wells, Thomas, Capt. 3rd Reg. Cont. Artillery OM Wesson, James, Col. 9th Reg. MCL OM White, Edward, 2nd Lt. 3rd Reg. MCL OM White, Haffield, Capt. 5th Reg. MCL OM Whiting, John, Lt. 2nd Reg. MCL OM Whitwell, Samuel, Surg. 3rd Reg. MCL OM Wigglesworth, Edward, Col. 13th Reg. MCL OM Wild, Ebenezer, 2nd Lt. 1st Reg. MCL OM Williams, Abraham, Capt. 2nd Reg. MCL OM Williams, Ebenezer, 1st Lt. 1st Reg. MCL OM Williams, John, Capt. 1st Reg. MCL OM Williams, Joseph, Capt. 3rd Reg. MCL OM Williams, Robert, 1st Lt. 4th Reg. MCL OM Wing, Jonathan, Ens. 1st Reg. MCL OM Winslow, John, Capt. 3rd Reg. Cont. Artillery OM Woodbridge, Christopher, Capt. 3rd Reg. MCL OM Woodward, Samuel, Surg. Mate 3rd Reg. Cont. Artillery OM Yeomans, John, 1st Lt. 4th Reg. MCL

=== New Hampshire ===
John Adams, Samuel Adams, Joseph Boynton, Jonathan Cass, Samuel Cherry, Jonathan Cilley, Joseph Cilley, Amos Cogswell, Henry Dearborn, Amos Emerson, Jeremiah Fogg, Isaac Frye, Nicholas Gilman, Daniel Gookin, John Harvey, James Harvey McClary, Michael McClary, Neal McGaffey, Joshua Merrow, Joseph Mills, Josiah Munro, William Parker, Jr., Adna Penniman, Jonathan Perkins, Jeremiah Prichard, Benjamin Pierce, James Reed, William Rowell, Ebenezer Sullivan, John Sullivan, Robert Bradford Wilkins.

== New Jersey ==
James Anderson, Abraham Appleton, James Francis Armstrong, Daniel Baldwin, Jeremiah Ballard, William Barton, John Beatty, John Bishop, John Blair, Joseph Bloomfield, Absalom Bonham, James Bonnell, Seth Bowen, Nathaniel Bowman, David Brearley, Almarin Brooks, Jeremiah Bruen, Joseph Buck, William Burnet, Eden Burrowes, John Burrowes, Lambert Cadwalader, George Walker Campbell, Jabez Campfield, Samuel Conn, John Conway, Richard Cox, John Noble Cumming, Ephraim Darby, Elias Dayton, Jonathan Dayton, Cyrus De Hart, Nathaniel Donnell, Lewis Ford Dunham, Ebenezer Elmer, Eli Elmer, Peter Faulkner, Chilion Ford, Mahlon Ford, David Forman, Jonathan Forman, James Giles, Luther Halsey, Jacob Harris, James Heard, John Heard, William Helms, Dr. Thomas Henderson, Samuel Hendry, John Hollinshead, John Holmes, Jonathan Holmes, John Hopper, John Howell, Richard Howell, Andrew Hunter, Jacob Hyer, William Kersey, Abraham Kinney, John Kinney, Shepard Kollock, Derick Lane, Nathaniel Leonard, Richard Lloyd, Francis Luce, Absalom Martin, Giles Mead, Alexander Mitchell, Aaron Ogden, Matthias Ogden, Benajah Osmun, John Peck, Robert Pemberton, William Sanford Pennington, Jonathan Phillips, Jacob Piatt, William Piatt, John Polhemus, Samuel Reading, Anthony Reckless, John Reed, John Reed, John Reucastle, Jonathan Rhea, John Ross, Cornelius Riker Sedam, Samuel C. Seeley, Israel Shreve, John Shreve, Samuel Moore Shute, William Shute, Jonathan Snowden, Oliver Spencer, Moses Sprowl, Ebenezer Stockton, Abraham Stout, Wessel Ten Broeck Stout, Edmund Disney Thomas, William Tuttle, George Walker, Abel Weymen, Ephraim Lockhart Whitlock.

== New York ==
Aaron Burr, George Clinton, James Clinton, John Doughty, Nicholas Fish, Peter Gansevoort, Alexander Hamilton, Rufus King, Joseph Hardy, John Keese(major), John Lamb (general), Morgan Lewis, Henry Beekman Livingston, Henry Brockholst Livingston, Alexander McDougall, Charles McKnight, David Olyphant, Philip Schuyler, John Morin Scott, William Stephens Smith, John Stagg Jr, Ebenezer Stevens, Silas Talbot, Benjamin Tallmadge, Philip Van Cortlandt, Henry Vanderburgh, Cornelius Van Dyck, John Van Dyck, Richard Varick, William Scudder, Dr. Caleb Sweet, Maj.Gen. Friedrich Wilhelm von Steuben, Lt.Col. Bernardus Swartwout, Cornelius Swartwout, BG Philip Van Cortlandt, Friedrich Heinrich von Weissenfels.

Further list from Saffell:

Jonas Addoms, Peter Anspach, Aaron Aorson, Josiah Bagley, John Bard, Sebastian Bauman, Jerrick Beekman, William Belknap, Walter Bicker, Leonard Bleecker, James Bradford, James Brewster, David Brooks, Joseph Browne, Robert Burnett, Jonathan Burrall, Caleb Brewster, Aaron Burr, Duncan Campbell, John Cape, Nehemiah Carpenter, James Chrystie, Matthew Clarkson, James Clinton, George Clinton, Alexander Clinton, Christopher Codwise, Robert Cochran, Surgeon General John Cochran, William Colbreath, Michael Connolly, John Conway, Samuel Cooper, Andrew Cragie, John D. Crimshier, Ebenezer Crosby, Henry Cunningham, James Davidson, Henry Demler, Daniel Denniston, George J. Denniston, Pierre Regnier De Rousse, Simeon De Witt, Samuel Dodge, Samuel Dodge, John Doughty, Henry Dubois, Edward Dunscomb, Baron Charles D Aurier, John Elliott, Andrew English, James Fairlie, Ephraim Fenno, Nicholas Fish, George Fleming, John Fondy, Duoy Fondy, Joseph Foote, Theodocius Fowler, Joseph Frelick, John Furman, John Gano, David Gano, Peter Gansevoort, Benjamin Gilbert, James Giles, Aquilla Giles, John Graham, Charles Graham, Stephen Graham, Silas Gray, John W. Greaton, John Green, James Gregg, James Grier, John Grier, Isaac Guion, Hoysted Hacker, Mordecai Hale, Jonathan Hullctt, Luther Halsey, Alexander Hamilton, Abijah Hammond, John F. Hamtramck, Francis Hanmer, Abraham Hardensburg, Joseph Hardy, Samuel Hay, Nathaniel Henry, Benjamin Herring, Abel Holden, Bazaleel Howe, Isaac Hubbell, James Miles Hughes, Thomas Hunt, Christopher Button, Ephraim Hunt, Abraham Hyatt, Thomas T. Jackson, Cornelius T. Jansen, James Johnston, Robert Johnson, John Keese, Jacob Kemper, Daniel Hemper, John Lamb, Garret Lansing, John Lawrence, Nathaniel Lawrence, Jonathan Lawrence, George Leycraft, William Leycraft, Benjamin Ledyard, Isaac Ledyard, Morgan Lewis, Samuel Logan, Lebbcus Loomis, Henry E. Lutterloh, Abraham Leggett, Alexander McDougall, Renald S. Mc Dongall, Charles McKnight, Daniel McLane, Thomas Machin, Peter Magee, Samuel Mansfield, John Marsh, Elihu Marshall, Daniel Menema, Andrew Moodie, Joseph Morrell, William W. Morris, Ebenezer Macomber, Peter Nestell, Charles Newkirk, James Nicholson, Daniel Niven, William North, Nathaniel Norton, Daniel Parker, Charles Parsons, Henry Pawling, Samuel T. Pell, Robert Pemberton, Nathaniel Pendleton, William Peters, Richard Platt, William Popham, Henry Pray, William Price, Abner Prior, Thomas Randall, John Reed, Jacob Reed, John R. B. Rogers, Wilhelmus Ryckman, Baron De Steuben, John Sandford, Derick Schuyler, Philip Schuyler, William Scudder, John Shaw, Israel Smith, William S. Smith, Isaac Smith, Ephraim Snow, John Stagg, John Stake, Jehosaphat Starr, Gerard Stediford, Ebenezer Stevens, James Stewart, William Strachan, Caleb Swan, Bernardus Swartwout, Cornelius Swartwout, Caleb Sweet, George Sytez, William Stewart, Ebenezer Storer, Silas Talbott, Samuel Tallmadge, William Tapp, Peter Taulman, John C. Ten Broeck, Adam Ten Broeck, Alexander Thompson, Henry Tiebout, Thomas Tillotson, William Torrey, Robert Troup, John Trumbull, Thomas Turner, John F. Vacher, Philip Van Courtlandt, Cornelius Van Dyck, Henry Vandeburg, Bartholomew Vandeburg, John Van Dyck, Rudolph Van Hovenburgh, David Van Home, Jeremiah Van Rennselaer, Goosse Van Schaick, Garret Van Wagenen, Tunis Van Wagenan, Richard Varick, Veter Vosborough, Nicholas Van Rennselaer, John Waldron, Benjamin Walker, Jedediah Waterman, James Walson, Samuel B. Webb, Charles F. Weisenfels, Frederick Weisenfels, Jacob H. Wendell, John H. Wendell, Michael Wetzell, Andrew White, Anthony Walton White, Murinus Willett, Robert Wilson, Jacob Wright, Ephraim Woodruff, Peter Woodward

== North Carolina ==
William Lee Alexander, James Armstrong, John Armstrong, Thomas Armstrong, John Baptista Ashe, Samuel Ashe Jr., Peter Bacot, Benjamin Bailey, Kedar Ballard, Robert Bell, Jacob Blount, Reading Blount, Adam Boyd, Joseph Blyth(e), Gee Bradley, Alexander Brevard, Joseph Brevard, William Bush, Thomas Callender, John Campbell, James Campen, Benjamin Carter, Thomas Clark, John Clendennen, Benjamin Coleman, John Craddock, Anthony Crutcher, John Daves, Samuel Denny, Charles Dixon, Tilghman Dixon, Wynn Dixon, George Doherty, Thomas Donoho, Thomas Evans, Richard Fenner, Robert Fenner, William Ferebee, Thomas Finney, John Ford (Foard), James Furgus (Fergus), Charles Gerrard (Garrard), Francis Graves, James West Green, Joshua Hadley, Clement Hall, Selby Harney, Robert Hays, John Hill, Thomas Hogg, Hardy Holmes, Robert Howe, John Ingles, Curtis Ivey, Abner Lamb, Nathaniel Lawrence, Nehemiah Long, Archibald Lytle, William Lytle, William Maclean (McLane), William McClure, James McDougall, John McNees, Griffith John McRee, Joseph Monfort, James Moore, Hardy Murfree, John Nelson, Thomas Pasture (Pasteur), William Polk, Robert Raiford, Jesse Read, John Read (Reed), Joseph Thomas Rhodes, William Sanders (Saunders), Anthony Sharp(e), Daniel Shaw, Stephen Slade, John Slaughter, Jesse Steed, John Summers, Jethro Sumner, James Tate, Howell Tatum, James Tatum, James Thackston, Nathaniel Williams, William Williams, and Edward Yarborough

== Pennsylvania ==
Lt James McMichael, John Armstrong, Jr., Joshua Barney, John Barry, William Bingham, Thomas Boude, Daniel Brodhead, David Brooks, Edward Butler, Richard Butler, Thomas Butler, William Butler, Thomas Craig, Richard Dale, James Gilchrist, Edward Hand, Josiah Harmar, Thomas Hartley, Stewart Herbert, Joseph Howell Jr., Richard Humpton, William Irvine, Francis Johnston, John Paul Jones, Mareen Lamar, Robert Magaw, Thomas Mifflin, John Peter Gabriel Muhlenberg, Alexander Murray, Lewis Nicola, Samuel Nicholas, Zebulon Pike, Thomas Proctor, Arthur St. Clair, William Thompson, Anthony Wayne, Baron von Steuben, Isaac Van Horne, Jacob Bower.Gustave Rosenthal

Further list from Saffell:

John Armstrong, Thos. Wylis, Francis White, James McLean, Sam. Doty, W. Ferguson, David Zeigler, F. Mentges, J. Pratt, Richd. Fullerton, Geo. Bush, John Strieker, Erkuries Beatty, Wm. Moore, Robt. McConnell, Jab. Weitzel, Wm. Wilson, James Armstrong, Jno. Bankson, J. McFarlane, Jno. Markland, Jno. Bush, Thos. Doyle, Jos. Harmar, R. Allison, Andrew. Lytle, T. Seely, John Doyle, Jas. F. McPherson, William Magaw, Anty. Wayne, William McHatton, C. De Marcellin, Le Koy, Le Chevalier De Lambert, H. Henly, Andrew Henderson, Joseph Ashton, Edward Speer, Robt. McMordie, John Stoy, Walter Stewart, Enos Reeves, James Morris Jones, Jno. McDowell, E. Edwards, P. Peres, Andrew Porter, Francis Nichols, Francis Proctor, William Murrin, Hen. D. Purcell, Andy. Walker, Stewart Herbert, J. Mackinney, Francis Johnston, Ja: Chrystie, Henry Bicker, Wilder Bevins, Benj. Lodge, Thomas Dungan, T. Robinson, Jas. Gamble, Henry Piercy, Alexander. Parker, Jas. Chambers, Matthew Maus, Fredrick. Vernon, J. Grier, John B. Webster, J. Moore, A. G. Claypoole, Daniel Brodhead, Matthew McConnell, James Glentworth, J. Stake, W. Van Lear, T. B. Bowen, W. Macpherson, David. S. Franks, Jesse Crosley, Jno. Strieker, Stephen Moylan, Zebn. Pike, John Davis, Isaac Craig, Stephen Bayard, W. Finney, S. Montgomery, John E. B. Rogers, Wm. McCurdy, Jno. Reily, Thos. Proctor, Chas. Turnbull, James Lloyd, James Hamilton, Ph. Liebery, Jean Aug. De Florat, Jno. Wigton, John Harper, John Christie, Benj. Bartholomew, Samaul. A. McCoffrey, John Jordan, Isaac Van Home, Js. Campbell, Jno. McClelan, J. McCullam, Beading Beatty, Wm. Sproat, Eichd. Butler, Isaac B. Dunn, W. McDowell, Edw. Crawford, John Eose, Wm. Martin, John Marshall, Jas. Parr, C. North, Ln. Davis, Francis Murray, Wm. Kogers, James R. Reid, John Patterson, John Van Court, Jno. Stotesbury, Jas. Pettigrew, Peter Smith, John Armstrong, Edmund Bourke, T. Boude, George Stevenson, Robt. Parker, Jas. McMichael, Levi Griffith, James Montgomery, Thomas Douglas, Barnabas Binney, Thos. Bond, Edward. Hand, T. Campbell, Wm. Lusk, George North, Andw. Irvine, John Nevill, John Boyd, Jacob Mytinger, Jno. Michon, Robt. Sample, Alex. Benstead, Wm. Henderson, Robert Wilkin, Adm. Hubley, Worsley Ernes, Nat. Irish, Thomas M. McCalla, Ezekiel Howell, Robt. Coltman, John Bryce, Matthew McGuire, Robert McGaw, James G. Heron, Wm. Sade, Wm. Wilkins, James Gilchrist, Thos. McIntire, Blackall Wm. Ball, John Humphrey, William Power, James Smith, L. Keene, A. St. Clair, Jer. Jackson, Job Vernon, Eobert Patton, Sam L Smith, Robt Martin, Philippe Avabing, John Craig, Ber d Kibley, James Davidson, J. Talbott, George Tudor, Sam l Bryson, Wm. Price, Jonah Hallett, Wm. Williams, Philip Shrawder, Samuel Talbott, Barthol ? Von Heer, Sam L Reed, Gabriel Peterson, Daniel St. Clair, John Weidman, William McMurray, Jeremiah Freeman, Hugh Martin, Joseph L, Jno. Nice, Will. Mackey, John Hughes, J. B. Tilden, Richard Hampton, J. Simonds, Jacob Bower,

== Rhode Island ==
Israel Angell, William Barton, Archibald Crary, Nathanael Greene, Moses Hazen, Daniel Jackson, William Jones, Daniel Lyman, Coggeshall Olney, Jeremiah Olney, Stephen Olney, Henry Sherburne, Silas Talbot, William Tew, Simeon Thayer, James Mitchell Varnum, Abraham Whipple, Joseph Arnold.

== Virginia ==
Charter members from Virginia include: Richard Clough Anderson Sr., George Baylor, Francis T. Brooke, Abraham Buford, Nicholas Cabell, William Overton Callis, Edward Carrington, Louis de Corny, John Cropper, William Davies, Christian Febiger, Horatio Gates, John Gibson, William Grayson, John Green, Charles Harrison, William Heth, Peter Higgins, Samuel Hopkins, Henry Lee III, John Crittenden, Sr., Charles Lewis, George Mathews, James Monroe, Daniel Morgan, John Muhlenberg, John Neville, Thomas Overton, Major Charles Pelham, Thomas Posey, Major John Pryor, Robert Rankin, William Russell, Charles Scott, Alexander Skinner, John Stith, Richard Taylor, John Ward, John Watts, George Washington, George Augustine Washington, George Weedon, David Williams, Willis Wilson, James Wood, Henry Young.

== South Carolina ==
Isaac Huger, James Kennedy, Charles Lining, William Moultrie, Thomas Pinckney

== Other countries ==
=== France ===
Jean Baptiste de Traversay, Maxime Julien Émeriau de Beauverger, Pierre Douville, Pierre L'Enfant, Louis-René Levassor de Latouche Tréville, Paul François Ignace de Barlatier de Mas, Louis Saint Ange Morel, chevalier de la Colombe, Gilbert du Motier, Louis Marc Antoine de Noailles, Georges René Le Peley de Pléville, Charles Armand Tuffin, Jean Gaspard Vence, Alexandre-Théodore-Victor, Jean-Baptiste Donatien de Vimeur, Joseph de Cambis, Claude-Anne de Rouvroy de Saint Simon, Maurice Jean Marie Boudin de Launay de Tromelin, Pierre de Roquefeuil. Jean-François de Galaup, Comte de Lapérouse.

=== Polish–Lithuanian Commonwealth ===
Tadeusz Kościuszko

=== Sweden ===
Count Axel von Fersen, Baron Curt von Stedingk. (Members of the French Society.)

== See also ==
- Founding Fathers of the United States
