= Tennille =

Tennille may refer to:

- Tennille, Georgia, United States
- Tennille (dog), guide dog supporting blind hiker Trevor Thomas

== People with the name ==
- Francis Tennille (1747–1819), American Revolutionary War Lieutenant Colonel
- Grant Tennille (born 1968/9), American politician
- Toni Tennille (born 1940), American singer, part of the duo Captain & Tennille
- Tennille McCoy (born 1977), member of the New Jersey General Assembly

== See also ==
- Captain & Tennille, American recording artists primarily active in the 1970s
- Tenille, an alternate spelling of the given name
