= Robert Oliver (soldier) =

American politician

Robert Richard Oliver (1738–1810 or 1811) was a lieutenant colonel in the American Revolutionary War and a representative and president of the council of the Northwest Territory's first general assembly.

== Early life ==
Oliver was born in Boston to Irish immigrants. In 1763, he married Mary Walker of Worcester.

== Revolutionary War ==
He enlisted as a lieutenant of a company of Minutemen in April 1775. Oliver was promoted to captain in the 3rd Massachusetts Regiment in 1776, major in the 2nd Massachusetts in November 1777 or 3rd Massachusetts (November 1, 1777–January 1, 1783) and lieutenant colonel in the militia in 1779. Major Oliver was assigned to the 2nd Massachusetts from January 1 to November 3, 1783. He served under Colonel Rufus Putnam, and his service was applauded by Baron von Steuben. He retired in November 1783 as a brevet lieutenant colonel of the 2nd Massachusetts.

The Library of Congress possesses a number of letters from Oliver to George Washington, David Humphreys (an aide de camp to Washington), William Heath and others, as well as letters to Oliver. For example, Major Oliver and other officers of the Massachusetts Line signed a June 13, 1779, letter to George Washington regarding issues they had with how promotions were being handled.

Oliver is an original member of the Society of the Cincinnati.

== Post-war ==
After the war, Oliver moved to the Northwest Territory. He was appointed a justice of the peace of Washington County in 1788, and a major of the county militia the following year. He was also a judge on the Court of Common Pleas (dates unknown). He invested in the Ohio Company of Associates, purchasing two shares, and was elected its president in 1801. A May 10, 1792, proclamation granted Oliver, Rufus Putnam, Manasseh Cutler and Griffin Green 214,285 acres (86,718 ha) for "warrants ... issued for army bounty rights".

He was elected as a representative of Washington County after the formation of the first territorial legislature in 1798, also serving as the president of the council (1779–1803). He ran for the Ohio Senate as a Federalist in 1803 (the year Ohio became a state), but came in fifth. He was second in an 1807 election for Washington County commissioner.

He died in Marietta, Ohio, in 1810 or 1811.
