= John Greaton =

Continental Army General

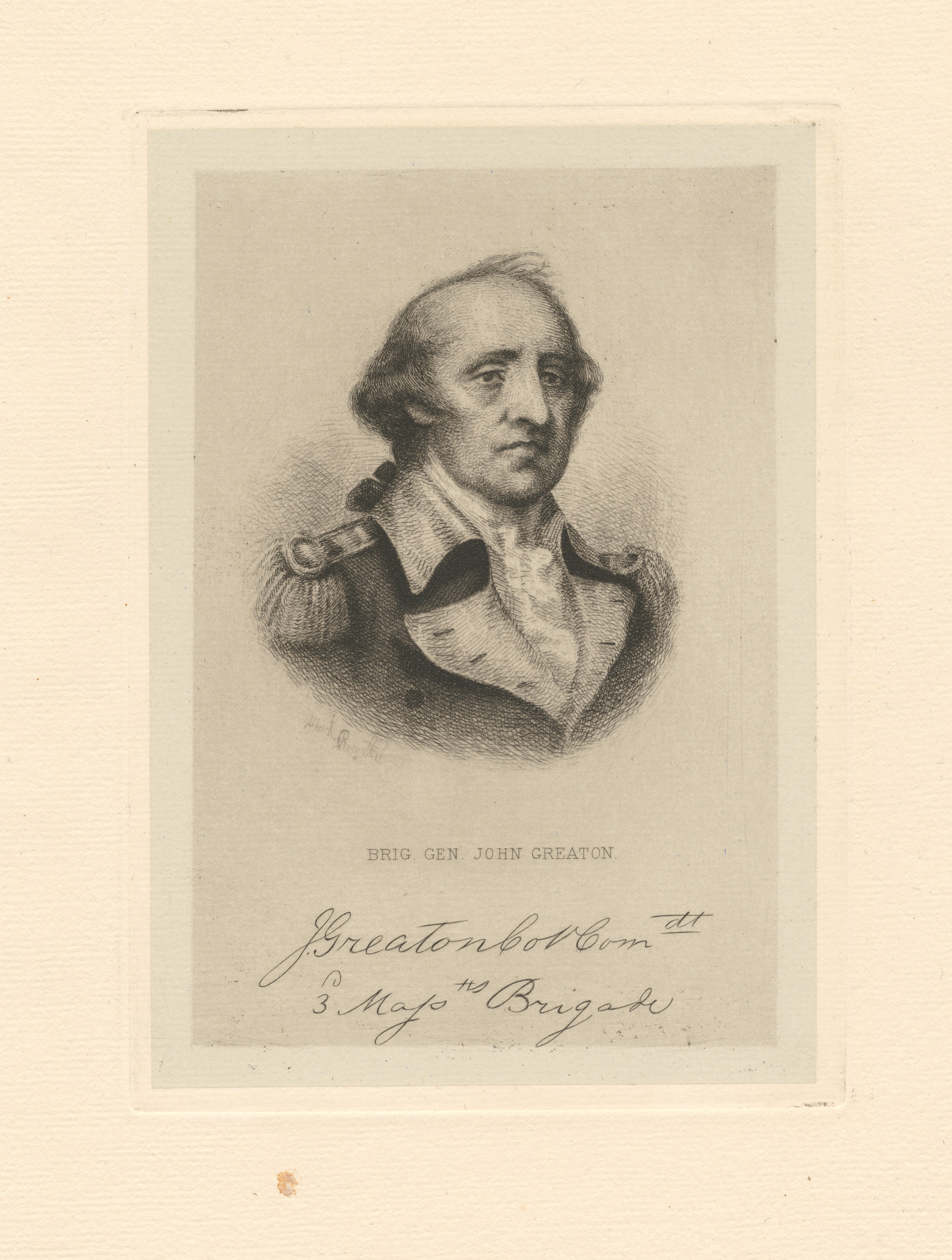
- Born: March 10, 1741; Roxbury, Massachusetts
- Died: December 16, 1783 (aged 42); Roxbury, Massachusetts
- Burial place: Eliot Burying Ground
- Spouse: Sarah Greaton
- Military career
- Allegiance: United States
- Service/branch: Continental Army
- Rank: Brigadier General
- Conflicts: American war of Independence; Battle of Lexington and Concord; Siege of Boston; Battle of Long Island; Battle of Saratoga

John Greaton, Jr. (March 10, 1741 – December 16, 1783) was an American inn-keeper and military leader from Roxbury, Massachusetts who served as a brigadier general in the Continental Army during the American Revolutionary War.

== Life and career ==
Greaton was the son of John Greaton, the owner of the Greyhound Tavern in Roxbury which was situated on the only road leading out of Boston at the time. It was subsequently torn down and replaced by Roxbury's first fire engine house by 1784.

Before the start of the American Revolutionary War, Greaton worked as a merchant, leasing a store for the sale of West Indian goods. He was also a member of the Sons of Liberty and an officer in the militia. By 1774, he was the lieutenant of the militia for Roxbury's first parish and in November of that year he was chosen, along with fourteen others, to "carry into execution the agreement and association of the late Continental Congress," which referred to the boycott enacted by the First Continental Congress in retaliation for the Intolerable Acts of the British Parliament.

By April 1775 Greaton was the commander of a company of minuteman and saw action at the Battles of Lexington and Concord in association with Brigadier General William Heath and Major General Joseph Warren. Greaton was subsequently promoted through the ranks of Heath's regiment. He was formally made a colonel of the 3rd Massachusetts regiment on September 29, 1779 with his date of service backdated to July 1, 1775. During the Siege of Boston, Greaton led successful raids that led to the destruction of British supplies including the capture of several hundred livestock.

In late 1775 and into 1776 Greaton was in command of one of the regiments dispatched to Canada where he served under the command of Brigadier General William Thompson. Thompson was captured at the Battle of Trois-Rivières in June 1776. Greaton later served in the Trenton and Princeton campaigns and served under Brigadier General John Nixon during the Saratoga campaign.

Greaton was promoted to brigadier general by the Continental Congress on January 7, 1783. He was one of the officers who wrote to the Continental Congress requesting the commute of half-pay for life pledged to the retired soldiers into full pay for a certain number of years or an immediate lump sum. He remained in the army until it was disbanded on November 3, 1783. He died less than two months later in Roxbury on December 16, 1783. His widow, Sarah Greaton, wrote to the Continental Congress two years later to request the land grant that her husband was owed be paid out in cash instead. The Continental Congress denied the request in July, 1788.
