= Francis Tennille =

American Revolutionary War officer

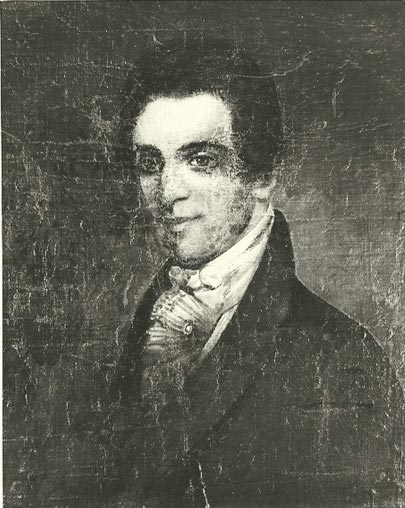
- Francis Tennille, Oil on Canvas
- Born: 1747; Virginia, Colony of Virginia, British America
- Died: May 21, 1819 (aged 71–72); Washington County, Georgia, United States
- Burial place: Murphy Cemetery, Warthen, Georgia, United States
- Military career
- Allegiance: United States of America
- Branch: Colonial militia; Continental Army
- Rank: Lieutenant Colonel (Continental Army)
- Awards: Founding Member of the Society of the Cincinnati

Signature
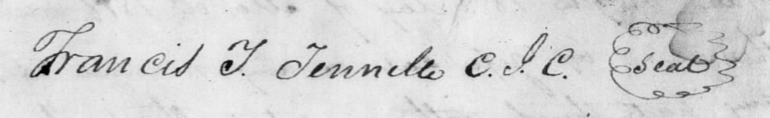

Francis Tennille (1747—May 21, 1819), was a Lieutenant Colonel during the American Revolutionary War who fought for the American Continental Army.

Born in Virginia, Tennille moved to Georgia before the war broke out in 1775. He joined the 2nd Georgia of the Continental Line and on June 20, 1777 became Lieutenant Colonel and served to the close of war. After the war, Lieutenant Tennille received from the general government a commission as Captain by brevet, in recognition of his services in the Continental Army. This commission was in possession of his son Colonel Francis T. Tennille until after the Civil War when a member of the family, hoping to establish a claim, sent it with a number of other commissions of Colonel Francis T. Tennille to Washington where it was lost. William A. Tennille, his grandson, stated he had often handled the commission and remembered it well. It was signed by General Miflin, Adjutant General of the Army. The title Lieutenant Colonel, which he held, is supposed to indicate his rank in the militia.

== Military highlights ==
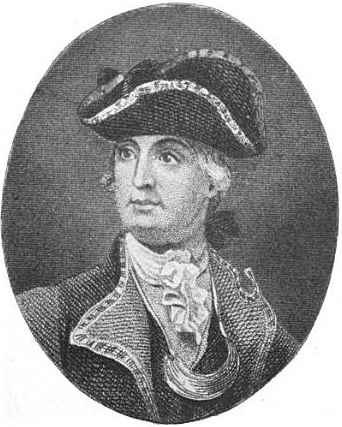
General Robert Howe

In several histories it is stated that General Robert Howe, while at Cherokee Hill, South Carolina, after his retreat from Georgia, dispatched Tennille with orders to Major Joseph Lane (commanding at Sunbury) and to Lieutenant Aaron Smith of the 3rd Regiment of South Carolina (who was in command at Ogeechee Ferry) "to evacuate their posts, retreat across the country and rejoin the main army." It is recorded as a matter of some importance that Tennille successfully accomplish his mission and that "the order was received in ample time".

It is also a matter of record that Tennille and a number of other officers of the Continental Army were voted by the Georgia House of Assembly certain grants of land in recognition of their services to the State in that they "voluntarily did duty in common with privates of the militia under Colonel Elija Clark".

The following are the names of the officers who with Tennille received land grants "proportional to the rank of each" agreeable to the above-mentioned ranks in the Continental Army. The list is from the Journal of the House of Assembly as published in the Georgia Gazette, Thursday June 9, 1785 and is as follows: Lieut. Col. John McIntosh, Maj. John Milton, Capt. Lackland McIntosh, Capt. Francis Tennille, Capt. John Morrison, Capt. Cornelius Collins, Lieut. Nathaniel Pearre, Lieut. John Mitchell, Lieut. John Maxwell, Lieut.Robert Howe, Lieut. Harry Allison, Lieut. John Peter Wagnon, and Lieut. Christopher Hillary.

== Society of the Cincinnati ==
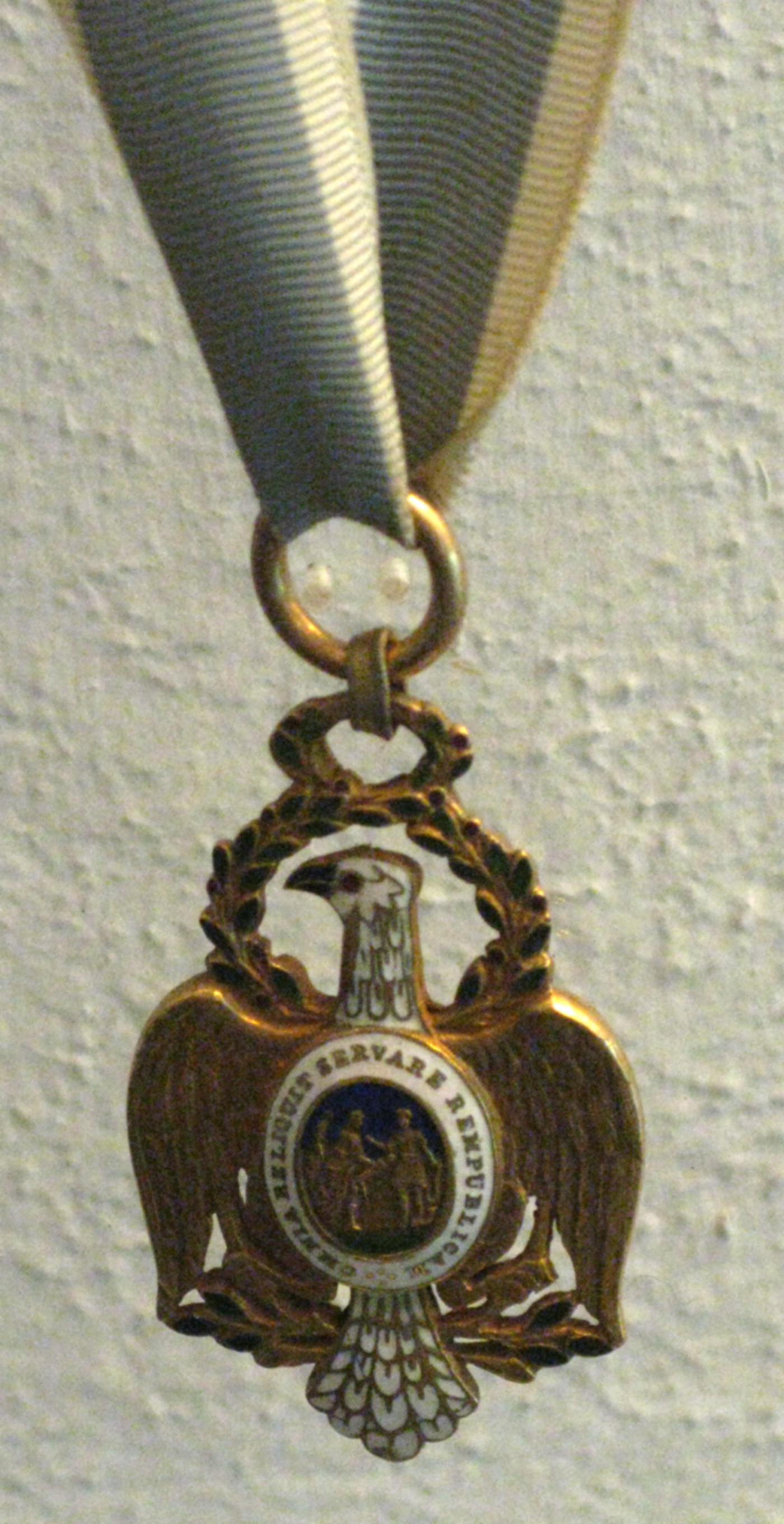
Society of the Cincinnati Eagle

The Society of the Cincinnati is a fraternal, hereditary society with thirteen constituent societies in the United States and one in France, founded in 1783, to preserve the ideals and fellowship of the officers of the Continental Army who served in the American Revolutionary War. Now in its third century, the Society promotes public interest in the Revolution through The American Revolution Institute, the Society's library and museum collections, publications, and other activities. It is the oldest, patriotic hereditary society in America. Francis Tennille was admitted as an original member of the Society of the Cincinnati in the state of Georgia.

== Personal life ==
Tennille was the first settler of that name in Washington County, Georgia, moving there from Virginia before the Revolutionary War. He was a surveyor for the State and his brother Benjamin was his Deputy. One or both of these names appear on nearly all the old land grants from before 1790 to 1800. He erected and lived in the first frame house ever built in the county. The lumber was sawed out with a "whip saw"; whereby the logs were raised on blocks and one man below and one above operated the saw. The house was still standing in 1900, five miles northwest of Sandersville.

Col. Tennille was twice married. His first wife was Miss Pollard of Virginia and his second was Mary Bacon Dixon who was born in Virginia in 1773 and died in Washington County, Georgia, in 1848. she was the granddaughter of General Nathaniel Bacon, of Virginia, who was a lineal descendant of the famous English family of that name.

It has been documented that Francis Tennille owned over 6000 acres and 57 slaves.

== Legacy ==
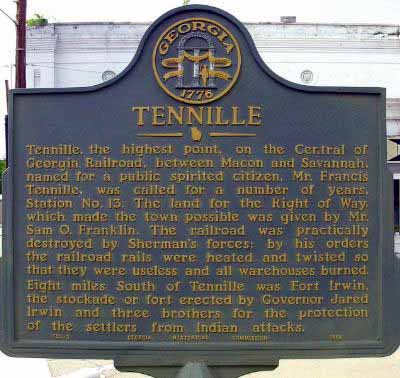
Historic marker in Tennille, GA

The city of Tennille, Georgia in Washington County, Georgia, was named in his honor. The population was 1,505 at the 2000 census. It was home for 10 years to noted architect Charles Edward Choate.
