= 15th Air Transport Squadron =

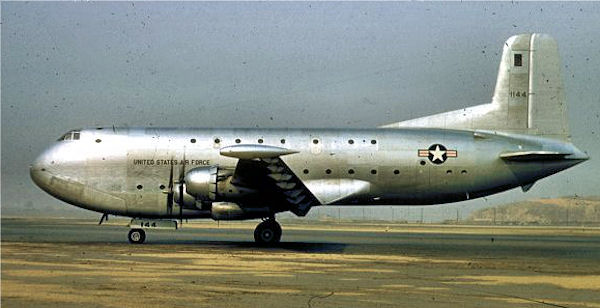
- Squadron C-124 Globemaster II (Note: Aircraft is Douglas C-124A-DL Globemaster II, serial 51–144. This photo was taken when the aircraft was delivered, before MATS markings were applied.)
- Active: 1942–1943; 1952–1965
- Country: United States
- Branch: United States Air Force
- Role: Airlift
- Motto: Pugnis et Calcibus (Latin for 'With All Our Might') (Note: Literally, with fists and heels or by punches and kicks.)

Insignia
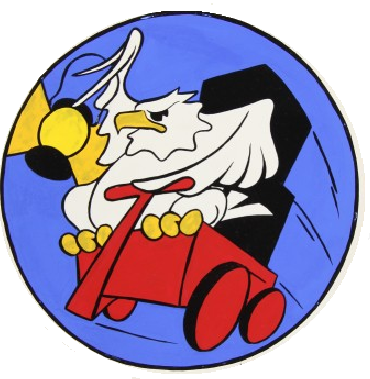
- 15th Air Transport Squadron emblem (Note: Approved 1959)

The 15th Air Transport Squadron is an inactive United States Air Force unit. It was last assigned to the 1607th Air Transport Wing of Military Air Transport Service at Dover Air Force Base, Delaware, where it was inactivated on 1 January 1965.

During World War II the squadron was active from 1942 to 1943. It was disbanded when Air Transport Command disbanded its squadrons and groups and replaced them with numbered stations.

The squadron was reconstituted in 1952 and served for the next thirteen years as a heavy airlift unit on the east coast of the United States.

== History ==
=== World War II ===
The 15th Air Transport Squadron's lineage can be traced back to 18 February 1942 when the unit was constituted as the 15th Air Corps Ferrying Squadron. It was activated on 7 March 1942 and later assigned to the 8th Ferrying Group of Air Corps Ferrying Command's 23rd Army Air Force Ferrying Wing, stationed at Presque Isle Army Air Field, Maine.

Presque Isle had been planned to serve as a transfer point at which Ferrying Command crews would turn over aircraft to the British for transoceanic delivery. Construction of the base's facilities was authorized in August 1941, and the work proceeded through the fall under the supervision of Ferrying Command control officers. The base was ready for limited operations by mid October. It became the main port of embarkation for American aircraft flying the Atlantic. It was at Presque Isle that, in January 1942, the headquarters of the newly activated North Atlantic Sector of the Ferrying Command was established.

On 1 July 1942, the Air Corps Ferrying Command became the Air Transport Command. It consisted of two main divisions, the Ferrying Division and the Air Transport Division. The 23rd wing was redesignated the North Atlantic Wing to describe of its geographical responsibility within a month of its organization. In March 1943 Air Transport Command units not directly involved with ferrying aircraft were redesignated as transport groups and transport squadrons, including the 15th. On 1 September 1943 the 15th Transport Squadron was disbanded and its mission, personnel and equipment were transferred to Station 2, North Atlantic Wing, Air Transport Command.

=== Military Air Transport Service ===
On 20 June 1952, the squadron was reconstituted and redesignated the 15th Air Transport Squadron (Heavy). On 20 July 1952 the squadron assumed the personnel, equipment and mission of the 1253rd Air Transport Squadron, which was simultaneously discontinued as Military Air Transport Service (MATS) replaced its table of distribution flying squadrons with more permanent units. The unit was assigned to the 1600th Air Transport Group at Westover Air Force Base, Massachusetts. The squadron flew the Douglas C-124 Globemaster II.

On 8 March 1955, Headquarters, MATS directed its Atlantic Division move the 15th from Westover to Dover Air Force Base, Delaware. The squadron moved on 20 April and was relieved from the 1600th Air Transport Group and assigned to the 1607th Air Transport Group at Dover. At the time of the move the unit was authorized 68 officers and 342 enlisted personnel with twelve C-124 Globemasters assigned. The squadron commander was Major Wayne S. Crawford Jr.

During three weeks in May 1955 a crew from the 15th, in addition to crews from the 40th and the 45th Air Transport Squadrons, operated five aircraft in support of Project Icecube, the construction of the Distant Early Warning Line network in northern Canada. Operating out of Dover, five aircraft and crews made a total of 28 hazardous ice landings at Mount Joli, Quebec, carrying over one million pounds of cargo.

The 1607th Air Transport Wing was reorganized during the latter half of 1955. The most noticeable change affecting the 15th's airlift operations was the activation of both the 1607th Air Base Group and the 1607th Maintenance Group placing them under the wing. Major George E. Hedge, formerly of the 15th, assumed command of the Maintenance Group's 1607th Periodic Maintenance Squadron. Also, individual squadron maintenance was abolished on 1 January 1957, when the entire maintenance function was placed with the 1607th Maintenance Group.

The mission responsibilities of the 15th Air Transport Squadron's airlift operation expanded considerably. In the years following, the 1607th Air Transport Wing assumed additional responsibility for logistical airlift operations including entire unit deployments, airdrop supply, airlanded supply, scheduled and nonscheduled airlift, joint airborne operations and training to include the capability for airdrop of personnel and cargo.

The 15th Air Transport Squadron assumed its share of responsibilities in major joint mobility exercises and global operations conducted during the Cold War. Examples include:

Big Slam/Puerto Pine, March 1960, an exercise that deployed 22,000 combat Army troops and 12,000 tons of gear from stateside bases to Ramey Air Force Base and Roosevelt Roads Naval Air Station, Puerto Rico;
Check Mate II, September 1961, involved the deployment of the 101st Airborne Division from Fort Campbell, Kentucky to bases in Europe;
Southern Express, October 1962, a North Atlantic Treaty Organization exercise which involved airlifting troops from central Europe to northern Greece; Big Lift, October 1963, the deployment of a full Army division from Texas to Germany;
The Cuban Missile Crisis, October 1962 (In support of President John F. Kennedy’s decision to blockade Cuba, the squadron was called upon to support the buildup of forces in the southeastern United States. Squadron aircrews worked at peak capacity airlifting troops and supplies from bases throughout the country to Florida and Guantanamo Bay);
Operation Good Hope, September 1957, the airlift of arms support to Jordan (Forty vehicles equipped with 109mm weapons were carried on five C-124s from Dhahran, Saudi Arabia to Amman, Jordan);
Operation New Tape (the Congo Airlift, at the time, history’s longest lasting operational airlift, lasting 3 1/2 years, from 1960 to 1964). A crew from the 15th Air Transport Squadron was the first Dover unit deployed in support of this operation and LtCol Harvey E. Beedy, commander of the 15th, was selected as the initial commander of the Provisional Transport Squadron at Chateauroux Air Base, France.
The Amigo Airlift, mercy missions to Santiago, Chile in May 1960, when an earthquake literally re-made parts of that country. The 15th ATS flew 623 hours in support of this operation.

On 7 February 1960, a 15th aircrew flew a record breaking non-stop flight from Hickam Air Force Base, Hawaii to Dover in eighteen hours and forty minutes. In 1962, the 15th flew the last leg of the four-month round-the-world tour of John Glenn's space capsule Friendship 7. In July 1963, the 15th flew the first leg of the presidential support mission for John F. Kennedy from Andrews Air Force Base to Dublin, Ireland. It was on this trip, at the Berlin Wall, that President Kennedy spoke the famous words "Ich bin ein Berliner". In February 1964, the 15th delivered a telespectrograph to Ascension Island in support of the space Project Fire. It was the first time such an instrument was airlifted as a complete unit. The squadron airlifted supplies and emergency equipment to Alaska after an earthquake struck that state in March 1964 and flew many re-supply missions from Thule Air Base, Greenland to the northernmost weather outposts at Nord, Greenland and Alert, Alaska. Both stations are within 500 miles of the North Pole.

In November 1964, the Secretary of Defense announced that eighty Department of Defense activities within the United States would be reduced or discontinued and that a troop carrier squadron would be transferred to Dover. Thus, the 15th Air Transport Squadron inactivated and many of its personnel were transferred to the activating 9th Troop Carrier Squadron. Some of its personnel were transferred to McChord Air Force Base, Washington and others to Southeast Asia.

== Lineage ==
- Constituted as the 15th Air Corps Ferrying Squadron on 18 February 1942
- Activated on 7 March 1942
- Redesignated 15th Transport Squadron on 18 March 1943
- Disbanded on 1 September 1943
- Reconstituted as the 15th Air Transport Squadron (Heavy) on 20 June 1952
- Activated on 20 July 1952
- Inactivated on 1 January 1965

=== Assignments ===
- Air Corps Ferrying Command, 7 March 1942 (attached to Foreign Division, Air Corps Ferrying Command) (Note: The Foreign Division was never formally organized.)
- 23rd Army Air Force Ferrying Wing (later North Atlantic Wing, Air Transport Command), 17 June 1942
- 8th Ferrying Group (later 8th Transport Group), 9 July 1942 – 1 September 1943.
- 1600th Air Transport Group, 20 July 1952
- 1607th Air Transport Group (Heavy), 20 April 1955
- 1607th Air Transport Wing (Heavy), 18 January 1963 – 1 January 1965.

=== Stations ===
- Presque Isle Army Air Field, Maine, 7 March 1942 – 1 September 1943
- Westover Air Force Base, Massachusetts, 20 July 1952
- Dover Air Force Base, Delaware, 20 April 1955. – 1 January 1965

=== Aircraft ===
- Douglas C-124 Globemaster II, 1952–1965

=== Commanders ===
- Major Wayne S. Crawford Jr. unknown – 9 January 1957
- Major Benjamin F. Armstrong 10 January 1957 – 15 June 1958
- LtCol Harvey E. Beedy 16 June 1958 – 1 July 1962
- LtCol Louis O. Williamson 2 July 1962 – 24 February 1963
- LtCol Henry G. Bierbaum 25 February 1963 – 4 July 1963
- LtCol William C. McCamy 5 July 1963 – 12 December 1963
- LtCol John G. Weir 13 December 1963 – 1 January 1965
