= William J. Begert =

U.S. Air Force general (born 1946)

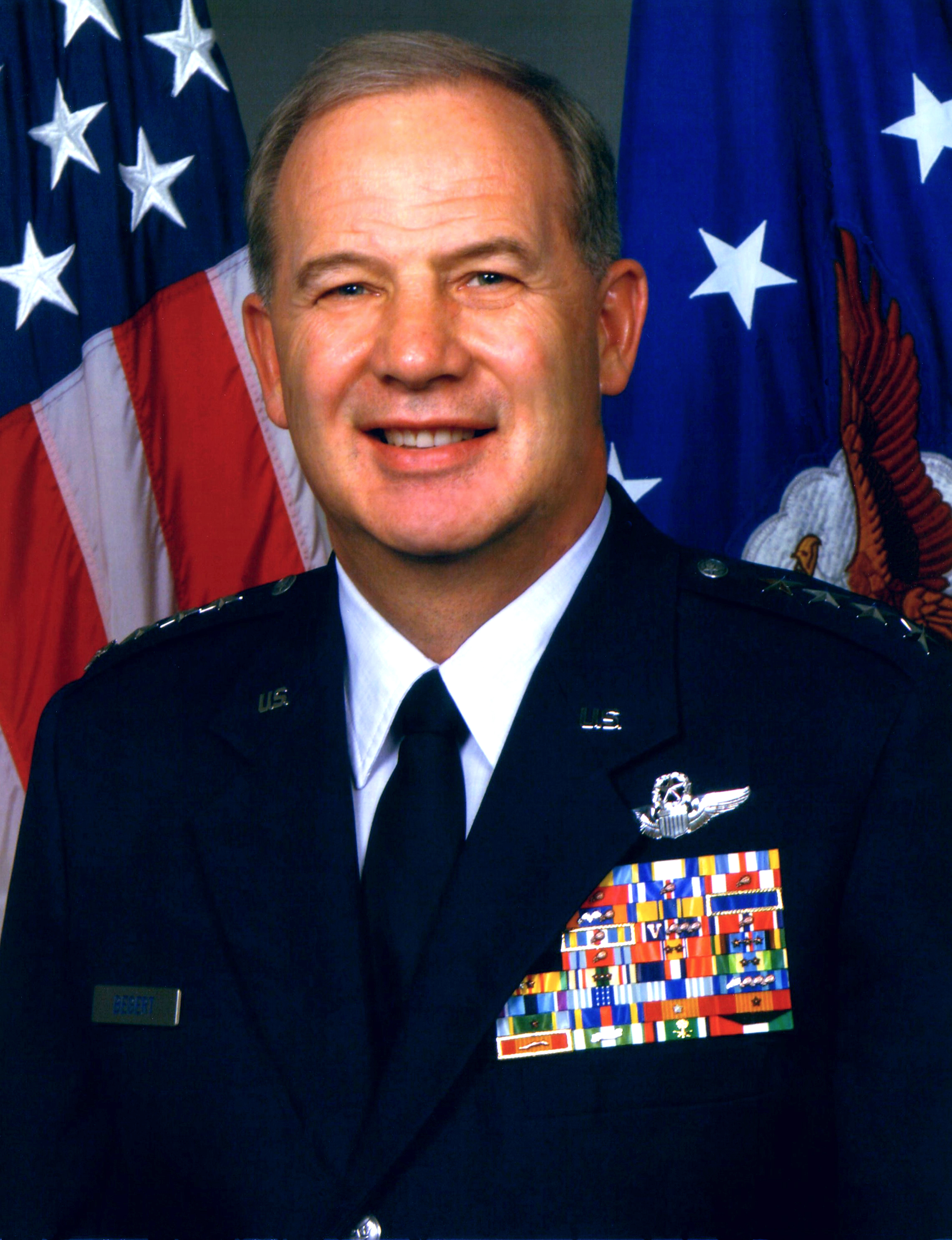
- General William J. Begert
- Born: June 9, 1946 (age 80); Lewiston, Maine
- Military career
- Allegiance: United States of America
- Branch: United States Air Force
- Service years: 1968–2004
- Rank: General
- Commands: Pacific Air Forces; Air Mobility Warfare Center; 60th Military Airlift Wing; 436th Military Airlift Wing
- Conflicts: Vietnam War
- Awards: Legion of Merit (2); Distinguished Flying Cross (2); Air Medal (12)

General William J. Begert (born June 9, 1946) is a retired four-star general in the United States Air Force (USAF). He served as commander, Pacific Air Forces, and Air Component Commander for the Commander, United States Pacific Command, Hickam Air Force Base, Hawaii. As commander, he had responsibility for USAF activities spread over half the globe in a command that supports 55,500 airmen serving principally in Hawaii, Alaska, Guam, Japan and the Republic of Korea.

== Background ==
Begert graduated from the United States Air Force Academy in 1968 and served as an instructor and evaluator pilot in C-141 Starlifter, O-2 Skymaster and C-5 Galaxy aircraft early in his career. During the Vietnam War, he was assigned as a forward air controller at Da Nang Air Base, Republic of Vietnam, where he flew more than 300 combat missions over Vietnam, Cambodia and Laos. He has more than 875 combat hours. In earlier assignments, Begert commanded a flying squadron and two USAF wings. He was chief of the Mobility Forces Division on the Air Staff. At Scott AFB, Illinois, he served as chief of staff as well as director of operations and logistics for Headquarters U.S. Transportation Command, and as inspector general for Headquarters Air Mobility Command. Begert was the first commander of the USAF Air Mobility Warfare Center at McGuire AFB, New Jersey. He also served as the vice commander of United States Air Forces in Europe during the air war over Serbia. Prior to becoming PACAF commander, he was the assistant vice chief of staff for Headquarters USAF, Washington, D.C. Begert retired on August 1, 2004. In 2005, Begert was named vice president for military international programs & business development with Pratt & Whitney, Military Engines. He is married to the former Joanne Feeley of Palos Park, Illinois. The Begerts have a son, Bill, a daughter, Kary, and two grandchildren.

== Education ==
- 1968 Bachelor of Science degree, United States Air Force Academy, Colorado Springs, Colorado
- 1974 Squadron Officer School, Maxwell AFB, Alabama
- 1980 Master's degree in public administration, University of Colorado
- 1981 Air Command and Staff College, Maxwell AFB, Alabama
- 1985 National War College, Fort Lesley J. McNair, Washington, D.C.
- 1990 Management Program for Executives, Joseph M. Katz Graduate School of Business, University of Pittsburgh
- 1995 Program for Senior Executives in National and International Security, John F. Kennedy School of Government, Harvard University

== Assignments ==
- August 1968 – August 1969, student, undergraduate pilot training, Randolph AFB, Texas
- September 1969 – March 1971, C-141 pilot and aircraft commander, 20th Military Airlift Squadron, Dover AFB, Delaware
- April 1971 – September 1971, French language student, Defense Language Institute, Washington, D.C.
- October 1971 – December 1971, combat crew training, Hurlburt Field, Florida
- January 1972 – January 1973, O-2A forward air controller and flight examiner pilot, 20th Tactical Air Support Squadron, Da Nang Air Base, Republic of Vietnam
- February 1973 – June 1977, C-5 pilot and flight examiner, 9th Military Airlift Squadron, 436th Military Airlift Wing, Dover AFB, Delaware
- July 1977 – June 1978, military studies instructor, U.S. Air Force Academy, Colorado Springs, Colorado
- July 1978 – July 1980, Air Officer Commanding, Cadet Squadron 20, U.S. Air Force Academy, Colorado Springs, Colorado
- August 1980 – June 1981, student, Air Command and Staff College, Maxwell AFB, Alabama
- July 1981 – December 1982, C-5 Aircraft Commander and Wing Executive Officer, 436th Military Airlift Wing, Dover AFB, Delaware
- January 1983 – July 1984, squadron commander of 3rd Military Airlift Squadron, Dover AFB, Delaware
- August 1984 – May 1985, student, National War College, Fort Lesley J. McNair, Washington, D.C.
- June 1985 – May 1986, mobility forces programmer, Directorate of Programs, Headquarters U.S. Air Force, Washington, D.C.
- June 1986 – April 1987, deputy chief of Mobility Forces Division, Directorate of Programs, Headquarters U.S. Air Force, Washington, D.C.
- May 1987 – January 1988, chief of Mobility Forces Division and chairman of Mobility Panel, Directorate of Programs, Headquarters U.S. Air Force, Washington, D.C.
- February 1988 – August 1989, vice commander, 436th Military Airlift Wing, Dover AFB, Delaware
- September 1989 – May 1990, commander of 436th Military Airlift Wing, Dover AFB, Delaware
- June 1990 – June 1991, commander of 60th Military Airlift Wing, Travis AFB, California
- July 1991 – November 1992, chief of staff, Headquarters U.S. Transportation Command, Scott AFB, Illinois
- December 1992 – July 1994, inspector general, Headquarters Air Mobility Command, Scott AFB, Illinois
- July 1994 – March 1995, commander, U.S. Air Force Air Mobility Warfare Center, Air Mobility Command, McGuire AFB, New Jersey
- March 1995 – August 1997, director of operations and logistics, J3 and J4, Headquarters U.S. Transportation Command, Scott AFB, Illinois
- August 1997 – August 1999, vice commander of Headquarters U.S. Air Forces in Europe, Ramstein Air Base, Germany
- August 1999 – May 2001, assistant vice chief of staff at Headquarters U.S. Air Force, Washington, D.C.
- May 2001 – August 2004, commander of Pacific Air Forces, and Air Component Commander for the Commander in Chief, U.S. Pacific Command, Hickam AFB, Hawaii

== Flight information ==
- Rating: Command pilot, parachutist
- Flight hours: More than 6,900
- Aircraft flown: C-5, C-21, C-37, C-40, C-130, C-141, KC-10, KC-135, O-2A, T-37, T-38 and T-41

== Awards and decorations ==
US Air Force Command Pilot Badge

Defense Distinguished Service Medal
Air Force Distinguished Service Medal
Defense Superior Service Medal
Legion of Merit with one bronze oak leaf cluster
Distinguished Flying Cross with oak leaf cluster
Meritorious Service Medal with oak leaf cluster
Air Medal with two silver and one bronze oak leaf clusters
Air Force Commendation Medal
Presidential Unit Citation
Joint Meritorious Unit Award with oak leaf cluster
Air Force Outstanding Unit Award with Valor device and three bronze oak leaf clusters
Air Force Organizational Excellence Award with oak leaf cluster
Combat Readiness Medal with oak leaf cluster
National Defense Service Medal with two bronze service stars
Armed Forces Expeditionary Medal with three service stars
Vietnam Service Medal with six service stars
Southwest Asia Service Medal with two bronze service stars
Kosovo Campaign Medal
Armed Forces Service Medal with two service stars
Humanitarian Service Medal
Air Force Overseas Short Tour Service Ribbon
Air Force Overseas Long Tour Service Ribbon
Air Force Longevity Service Award with silver and three bronze oak leaf clusters
Small Arms Expert Marksmanship Ribbon with service star
Air Force Training Ribbon
Vietnam Gallantry Cross with one silver and one bronze stars
Vietnam Gallantry Cross Unit Citation
Vietnam Campaign Medal
Kuwait Liberation Medal (Saudi Arabia)
Kuwait Liberation Medal (Kuwait)
