= 436th Airlift Wing =

United States Air Force unit

436th Airlift Wing

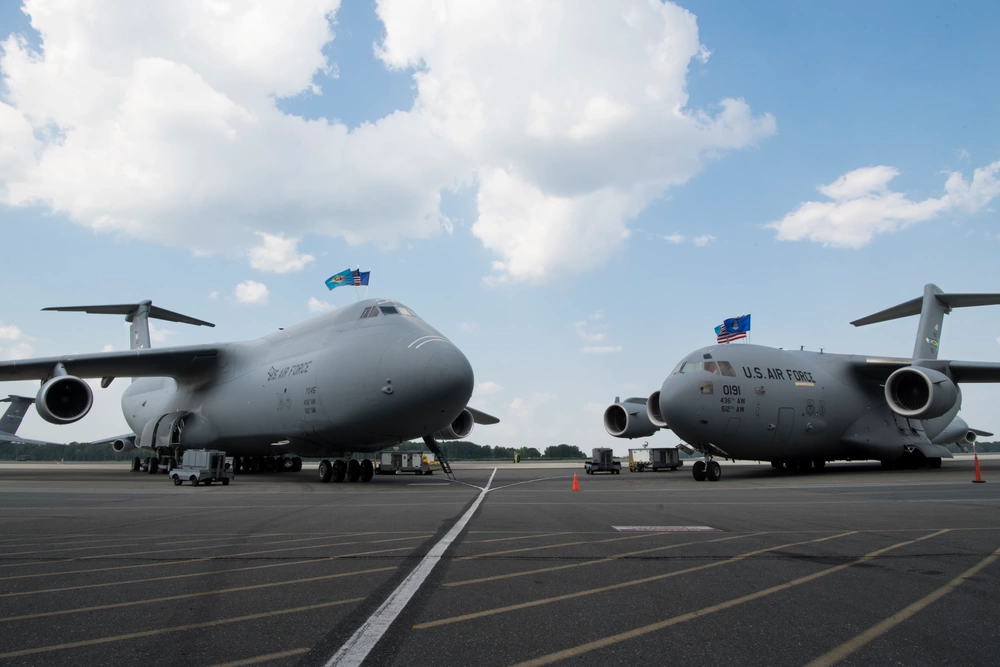
- 436th Airlift Wing C-5M (left) and C-17 (right)
- Active: 1949–1951; 1955–1958; 1966–present
- Country: United States
- Branch: United States Air Force
- Role: Airlift
- Size: 6,000
- Part of: Air Mobility Command
- Garrison/HQ: Dover Air Force Base, Delaware
- Nickname: "Eagle Wing"
- Mottos: Robustum Auxilium (Latin for 'Powerful Support'); Parati, Volentes, Potentes (Latin for 'Ready, Willing and Able')(1957-1966)
- Decorations: Air Force Outstanding Unit Award

Commanders
- Commander: Col Jamil I. Musa
- Deputy Commander: Col Christopher A. Prentiss
- Command Chief: CMSgt Elijah M. Edwards
- Notable commanders: Maj Gen Archer L. Durham; Gen Walter Kross; Gen William J. Begert

Insignia
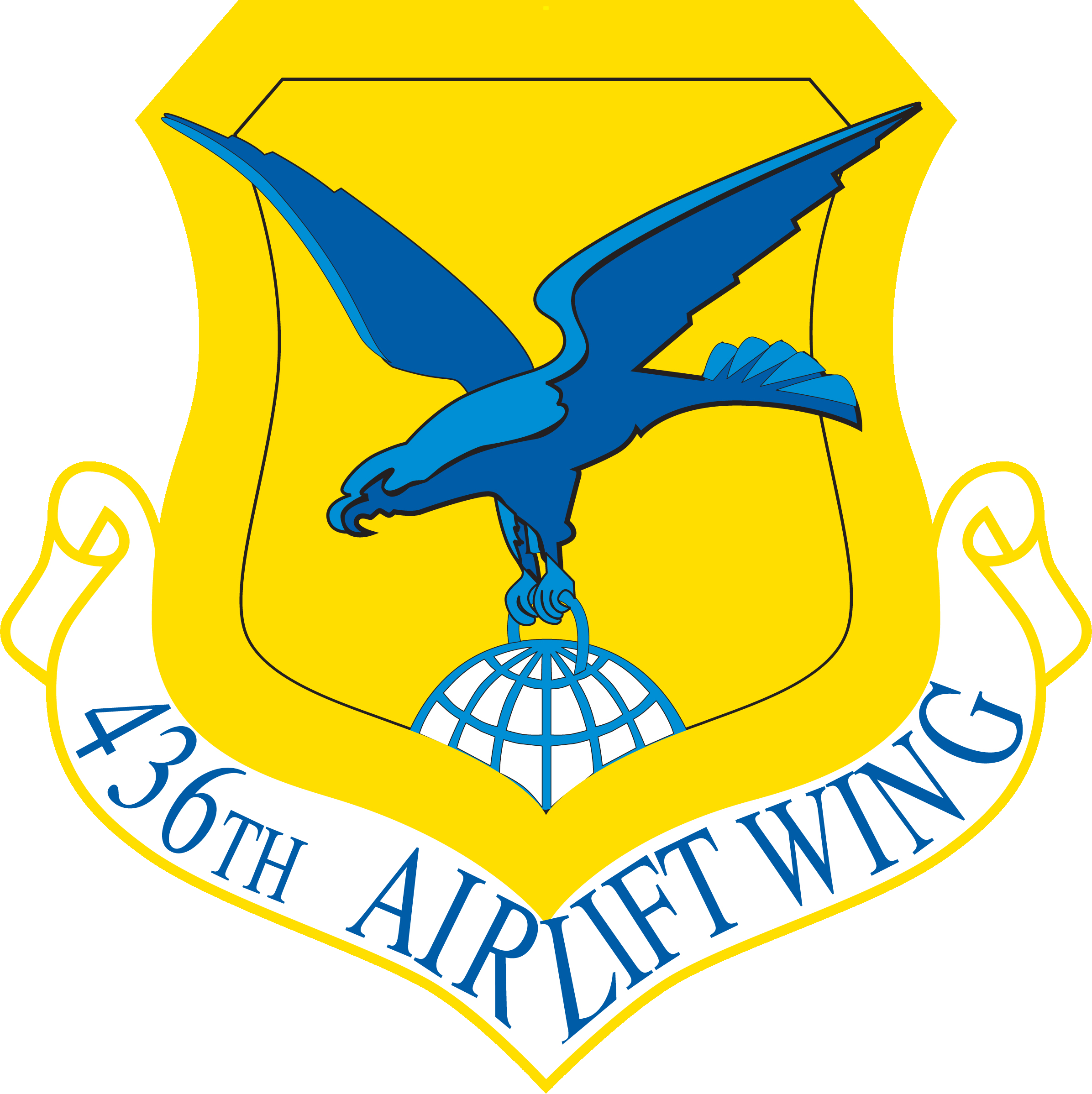
- 436th Airlift Wing emblem (Note: Approved 14 July 1966. Description: On a shield or, bordered argent, an American bald eagle volant, azure, highlighted bluebird, his wings superimposed over the border, airlifting with his talons a sphere of the second [color mentioned], fimbriated, longitude, latitude lines, grappling iron attached to upper area of the sphere, all of the fourth [color mentioned])

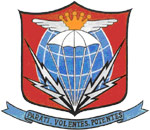
- 436 Troop Carrier Wing emblem (Note: Approved 20 June 1957. Description: Gules, a sphere azure with longitude and latitude lines argent; the sphere issuing from four lightning bolts radiating upward from base of the last [color mentioned]; a parachute, in pale, between the four bolts, two and two, argent, gores outlined of the second [color mentioned], all superimposed over the sphere; over all in chief an antique crown or, winged argent.)

Aircraft flown
- Transport: C-5 Galaxy; C-17 Globemaster III

The 436th Airlift Wing is an active unit of the United States Air Force, stationed at Dover Air Force Base, Delaware. The wing operates Lockheed C-5 Galaxy and Boeing C-17 Globemaster III aircraft, and is assigned to Air Mobility Command's Eighteenth Air Force.

Known as the "Eagle Wing", the 436 AW consists of the operations, maintenance, mission support, and medical groups, in addition to 12 divisions and two detachments. The wing has over 4,000 active-duty military and civilian employees. The wing's C-5 and C-17 fleet provides 25% of the nation's inter-theater airlift capability, facilitating worldwide movement of outsized cargo and personnel on scheduled, special assignment, exercise, and contingency airlift missions. The 436 AW is the only combat-ready C-5 Galaxy wing capable of employing airdrop and special operations tactics in support of worldwide airlift.

The wing routinely flies airlift missions throughout the world, projecting global reach to more than 90 countries on six continents including Asia, Africa, Australia, Europe, North America, and South America. Additionally, the 436 AW operates the largest and busiest aerial port in the Department of Defense, with its passenger terminal moving over 100,000 individuals in 1998.

== Units ==
The 436th Airlift Wing is organized into a quad-group structure:

436th Operations Group

- 3d Airlift Squadron; operates C-17 aircraft
- 9th Airlift Squadron; operates C-5M aircraft
- 436th Operations Support Squadron

436th Maintenance Group

- 436th Maintenance Squadron
- 436th Aircraft Maintenance Squadron; maintains C-5M aircraft
- 736th Aircraft Maintenance Squadron; maintains C-17 aircraft
- 436th Maintenance Operations Squadron
- 436th Aerial Port Squadron

436th Mission Support Group

- 436th Contracting Squadron
- 436th Security Forces Squadron
- 436th Force Support Squadron
- 436th Logistics Readiness Squadron
- 436th Communications Squadron
- 436th Civil Engineer Squadron;

436th Medical Group

- 436th Medical Operations Squadron
- 436th Aerospace Medicine Squadron
- 436th Medical Support Squadron

Additionally, the 436th Comptroller Squadron reports directly to the wing.

== History ==
=== 1940s–1970s ===
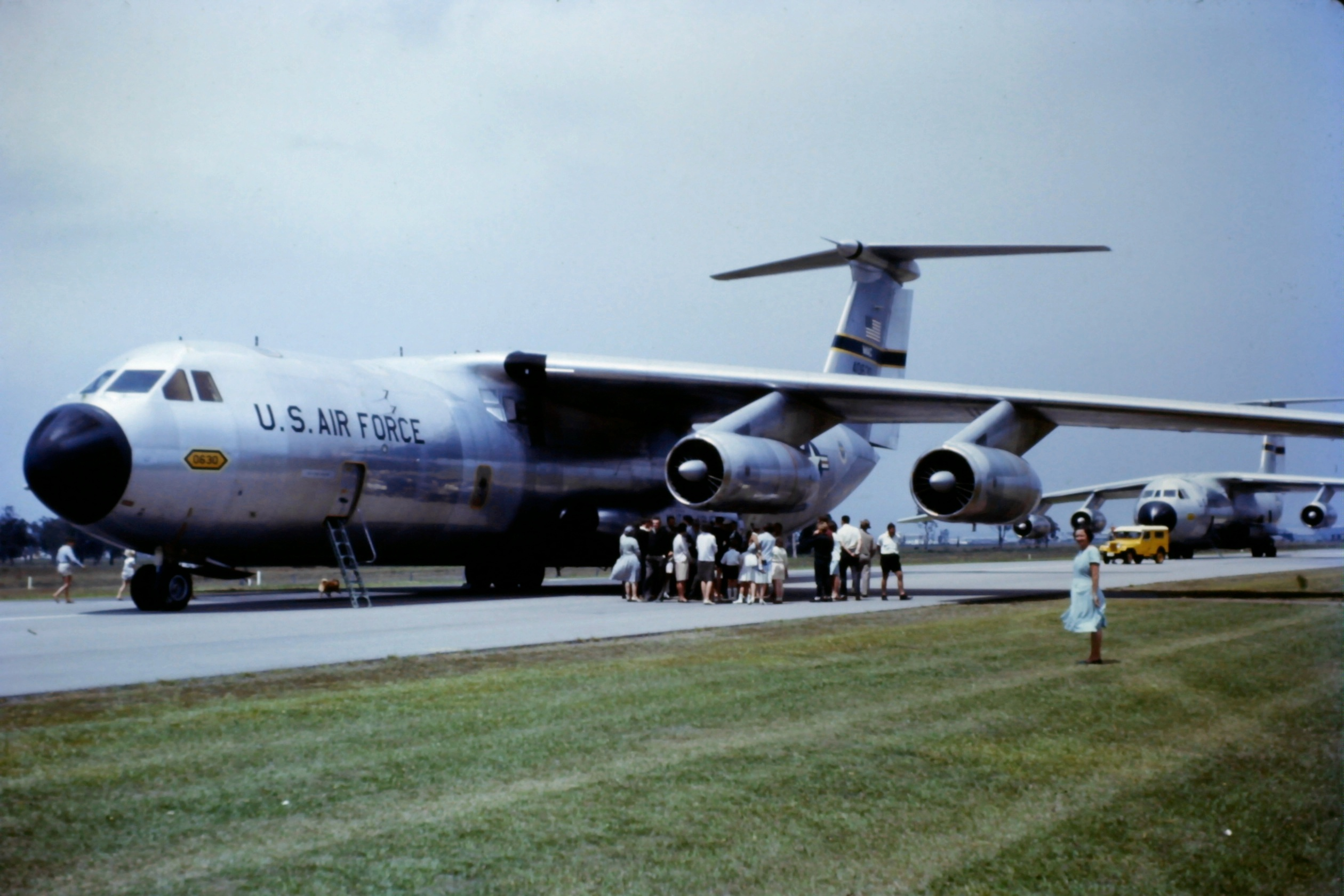
436 MAW C-141A at Brisbane Airport, Australia supporting the visit of President Lyndon B. Johnson in October 1966.

436th Airlift Wing Markings on a C-141A at Brisbane airport, Australia supporting the visit of President Lyndon B. Johnson, 22 October 1966.

The 436th Troop Carrier Wing (Medium) was established on 10 May 1949, and was activated as a reserve unit in June 1949 at Godman Air Force Base, Kentucky. The wing was relocated to Standiford Municipal Airport, Kentucky in October 1950, and flew cargo and trainer aircraft under the supervision of the 2236th Air Force Reserve Training Center. From 1–16 April 1951, the wing was briefly ordered to active service, with personnel serving as fillers for other United States Air Force (USAF) units during the Korean War. On 18 May 1955, the wing was reactivated as a reserve unit at Floyd Bennett Field, New York under supervision of the 2230th Air Reserve Flying Center. The wing resumed its training mission in cargo and trainer aircraft until its next deactivation in May 1958.

On 27 December 1965, the wing was reactivated and redesignated as the 436th Military Airlift Wing (436 MAW). In January 1966, the 436 MAW replaced the 1607th Air Transport Wing as the Military Airlift Command (MAC) host wing at Dover Air Force Base, Delaware. The wing initially flew strategic airlift missions with propeller-driven Douglas C-124 Globemaster II and Douglas C-133 Cargomaster aircraft. However, the C-124s were replaced by Lockheed C-141 Starlifter jet transports in the late 1960s. The C-133s were replaced by the Lockheed C-5 Galaxy in 1971. During this transition, the 436 MAW took part in Operation Eagle Thrust, transporting over 10,000 infantry soldiers from the 101st Airborne Division and more than 5,000 tons of cargo from Fort Campbell, Kentucky to Bien Hoa Air Base, Vietnam. The operation was the single largest transfer by air to Southeast Asia, and earned the wing its first of more than a dozen Air Force Outstanding Unit Awards.

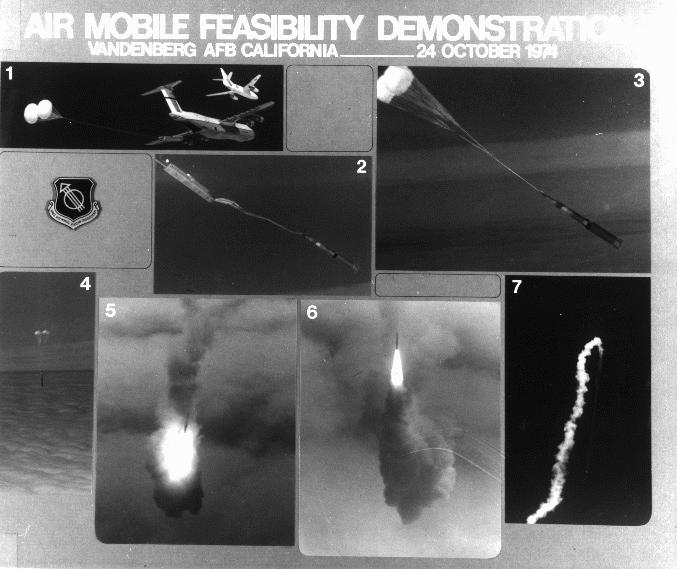
436 MAW C-5A participating in a 1974 Air Mobile Feasibility test.

In August 1973, the 436 MAW exchanged their remaining C-141s for the 437th Military Airlift Wing's C-5s at Charleston Air Force Base, South Carolina, making the 436 MAW the USAF's only C-5 exclusive wing, with 38 airlifters assigned. This allowed the wing to handle heavy, outsized cargo loads, which the C-141 could not. In October 1973, the 436 MAW was chosen to take part in Operation Nickel Grass, an effort to transport supplies to Israel during the Yom Kippur War. The wing flew 71 missions over a 32-day airlift, delivering Patton tanks, helicopters, howitzers, tractors, and radar systems, totaling more than 22,000 tons of cargo. Aircrews conducted the airlift without in-flight refueling capabilities, and the mission was considered to be the first operational test of the C-5.

Augmented by attached reserve aircrews from the 512th Airlift Wing, the 436 MAW continued to provide critical support throughout the 1970s, including the dropping and test-firing of a LGM-30 Minuteman missile, the delivery of a 40-ton superconducting magnet from O'Hare International Airport, Illinois to Sheremetyevo International Airport, Moscow, and supporting anti-rebel efforts in Zaire, earning the wing two consecutive Mackay Trophies in 1977 and 1978. In December 1978, members of the 436 MAW assisted in the evacuation of North American military dependents from Iran to Dover Air Force Base.

=== 1980s–1990s ===
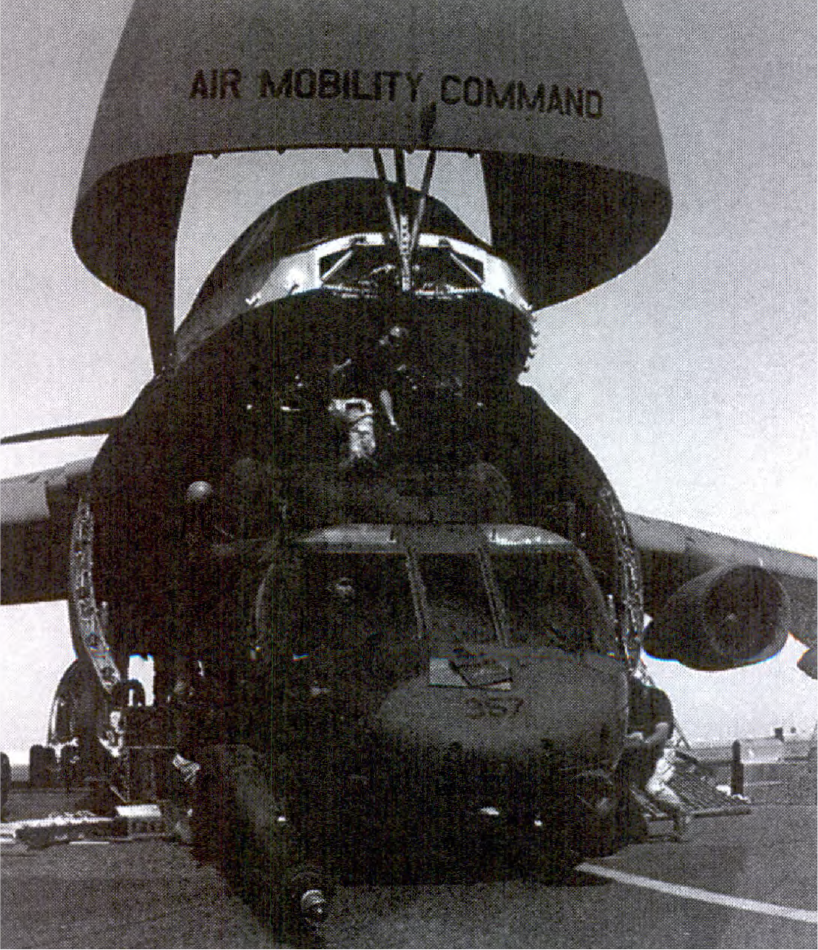
436 AW C-5 Galaxy transporting an HH-60G helicopter to Kuwait International Airport.

In October 1983, the 436 MAW flew 24 airlift missions in support of Operation Urgent Fury in Grenada. In March 1989, 436 MAW C-5s delivered cleanup equipment to the Exxon Valdez oil spill site in Prince William Sound, Alaska, including oil booms and skimmers. While attending the June 1989 Airlift Rodeo, a 436 MAW C-5 set a National Aeronautic Association world record when it airdropped 95 tons of equipment and personnel. In August 1989, the wing airlifted troops and supplies to Panama over 16 missions during Operation Just Cause. Due to its heavy airlift capability, the wing played a crucial role in Operation Desert Shield in August 1990. It delivered over 130,000 tons of cargo and spare parts to Saudi Arabia as part of the Mobility Air Forces' Desert Express. Dover Air Force Base became a major airlift hub and intermediate repair facility for C-5 aircraft participating in the operation.

From January–February 1991, the 436 MAW provided airlift support to Operation Desert Storm until the liberation of Kuwait on 28 February 1991. Dover personnel processed and hauled nearly 140,000 tons of cargo for Desert Shield, Desert Storm, and Operation Provide Comfort after the end of the Gulf War. For the remainder of 1991, the 436 MAW airlifted 580 tons of fire-fighting equipment to help extinguish oil field fires set by Iraqi forces as they retreated to Iraq. Following the Gulf War, the USAF underwent reorganization, and Air Mobility Command (AMC) replaced MAC as the manager of the United States' airlift fleet. In conjunction with the reorganization, AMC leaders redesignated the 436 MAW as the 436th Airlift Wing (436 AW) on 1 December 1991.

Throughout the 1990s, the 436 AW continued to provide humanitarian and military support around the globe. In September 1992, the wing assisted in disaster relief efforts after Hurricane Andrew destroyed much of Homestead Air Force Base, Florida. From 1992 to 1994, the wing participated in multiple international airlift missions, including Operations Provide Hope, Restore Hope, Support Hope, and Uphold Democracy. From October–November 1994, the wing successfully removed nearly half a ton of enriched uranium from Oskemen, Kazakhstan as part of Project Sapphire, completing the longest C-5 flight in USAF history. In 1996, the wing supported Operations Provide Promise and Joint Endeavor, delivering food and medical supplies to Bosnia and Herzegovina. In November 1997, the wing began airlifting Patriot missile batteries and elements of the 347th Air Expeditionary Wing to the Persian Gulf during Operation Phoenix Scorpion I, II, III, and IV. Following the aftermath of Typhoon Paka, the 436 AW helped airlift over 1,300 tons of relief supplies to Guam in January 1998. In March 1999, the 436 AW supported Operation Allied Force, a bombing campaign to end Serbian aggression in Kosovo. In August 1999, the wing airlifted 28 tons of equipment and a 70-person search and rescue team to Turkey as part of Operation Avid Response, after the devastating effects of the İzmit earthquake. In September 1999, another earthquake ravaged the Taiwanese township of Jiji, and the 436 AW was dispatched with an 85-person search and rescue team.

=== 21st century ===
Following the September 11 attacks in 2001, 436 AW C-5s completed 850 airlift missions in support of Operations Enduring Freedom and Iraqi Freedom. Personnel assigned to the 436th Aerial Port Squadron prepared over 450,000 tons of equipment–including daily rations, blankets and other necessities–for the 436 AW to transport in support of the global war on terrorism. On 1 October 2002, the 436 AW reorganized at the direction of the USAF Chief of Staff, General John P. Jumper. Major changes consisted of the establishment of the 436th Maintenance Group, the merging of the 436th Supply and Transportation Squadrons to form the 436th Logistics Readiness Squadron, and the redesignation of the 436th Support Group to the 436th Mission Support Group. In addition, the 436th Aircraft Generation, Component Repair, and Logistics Support Squadrons were redesignated as the 436th Aircraft Maintenance, Maintenance Operations, and Component Maintenance Squadrons.

In December 2003, the 436 AW provided assistance in transporting equipment from Urban Search and Rescue Virginia Task Force 1 (VA-TF1) to Bam, Iran following an earthquake in Kerman province. From 2004 to 2005, the wing helped airlift medical supplies and search and rescue personnel as part of the United States' humanitarian response to the 2004 tsunami in Indonesia, Hurricanes Katrina and Rita, and the 2005 Kashmir earthquake. On 10 February 2009, the 436 AW received its first C-5M Super Galaxy named "The Spirit of Global Reach". On 26 April 2015, the wing dispatched the first USAF aircraft, a C-17, carrying cargo and personnel for humanitarian aid following the earthquake in Nepal. The plane carried a United States Agency for International Development Disaster Assistance Response Team, the Fairfax County, Virginia Urban Search and Rescue Team and 45 tons of cargo.

== Lineage ==
- Established as the 436th Troop Carrier Wing (Medium) on 10 May 1949

Activated in the reserve on 27 June 1949
Ordered to active service on 1 April 1951
Inactivated on 16 April 1951

- Activated in the reserve on 18 May 1955

Inactivated on 15 May 1958

- Redesignated 436th Military Airlift Wing and activated on 27 December 1965 (not organized)

Organized on 8 January 1966
Redesignated 436th Airlift Wing on 1 December 1991

=== Assignments ===
- Ninth Air Force, 27 June 1949
- First Air Force, 1 August 1950 – 16 April 1951; 18 May 1955
- First Air Force, 18 May 1955
- Fourteenth Air Force, 25 March – 15 May 1958
- Twenty-First Air Force, 8 January 1966
- Eighteenth Air Force, 1 October 2003 – present

=== Components ===
Groups

- 436th Troop Carrier Group (later, 436th Operations Group): 27 June 1949 – 16 April 1951; 18 May 1955 – 15 May 1958; 1 December 1991 – present

Squadrons

- 1st Military Airlift Squadron: 8 January 1966 – 30 June 1971
- 3d Military Airlift Squadron: 1 August 1973 – 1 December 1991
- 9th Military Airlift Squadron: 8 January 1966 – 8 September 1968; 1 April 1971 – 1 December 1991
- 20th Military Airlift Squadron: 8 January 1966 – 1 August 1973
- 31st Military Airlift Squadron: 8 January 1966 – 8 April 1969; 1 October 1989 – 1 December 1991
- 39th Military Airlift Squadron: 8 January 1966 – 31 March 1971
- 52d Military Airlift Squadron: 8 January 1967 – 8 February 1969 (detached)
- 58th Military Airlift Squadron: 1 July 1966 – 15 August 1971

=== Stations ===
- Godman Air Force Base, Kentucky, 27 June 1949
- Standiford Municipal Airport (later, Standiford Field), Kentucky, 20 October 1950 – 16 April 1951
- Floyd Bennett Field (later, Naval Air Station New York), New York, 18 May 1955 – 15 May 1958
- Dover Air Force Base, Delaware, 8 January 1966 – present

=== Aircraft ===
- Beechcraft C-45 Expeditor, 1949; 1955–1957
- Douglas C-47 Skytrain, 1949–1951
- Curtiss C-46 Commando, 1955–1957
- Fairchild C-119 Flying Boxcar, 1957
- Douglas C-124 Globemaster II, 1966–1969
- Douglas C-133 Cargomaster, 1966–1971
- Lockheed C-141 Starlifter, 1966–1973
- Lockheed C-5 Galaxy, 1971–present
- Boeing C-17 Globemaster III, 2007–present
