= 39th Military Airlift Squadron =

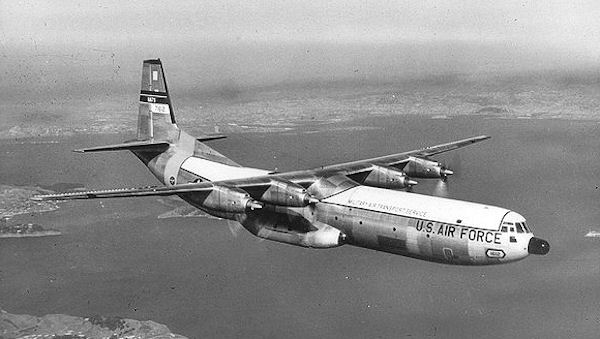
- 39th Squadron C-133A Cargomaster (Note: Aircraft is Douglas C-133A-5-DL Cargomaster, serial 54-142. This aircraft was scrapped in 1971.)
- Active: 1942–1943; 1954–1971
- Country: United States
- Branch: United States Air Force
- Role: Airlift
- Decorations: Air Force Outstanding Unit Award; Vietnamese Gallantry Cross with Palm

Insignia
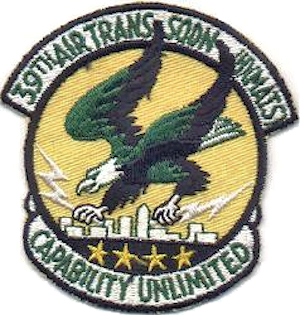
- 39th Military Airlift Squadron emblem

The 39th Military Airlift Squadron is an inactive United States Air Force unit. Its last was assigned to the 436th Military Airlift Wing, Military Airlift Command, stationed at Dover Air Force Base, Delaware. It was inactivated on 31 March 1971.

== History ==
Activated in 1942 to ferry newly manufactured combat aircraft to combat units deployed overseas. Primarily flew B-25 and B-26 medium bombers to Southwest Pacific Area, however also ferried aircraft to Africa for units assigned to the North African Campaign and European Theater of Operations. Inactivated in October 1943 during realignment of Ferrying Command to Air Transport Command.

Reactivated in 1954 under Military Air Transport Service, operated Douglas C-54 Skymaster aircraft on a worldwide scale from Dover Air Force Base, Delaware. Upgraded to Douglas C-133 Cargomaster heavy-lift strategic transports in 1957, and continued global strategic airlift operations. Reassigned to Military Airlift Command (MAC) in 1966 after inactivation of MATS, continued operations until retirement of C-133s in 1971 then inactivated.

== Lineage ==
- Constituted as the 39th Ferrying Squadron on 9 July 1942

Activated on 28 July 1942
Redesignated 39th Transport Squadron on 24 March 1943
Disbanded on 18 October 1943

- Reconstituted and redesignated 39th Air Transport Squadron, Medium on 4 November 1953

Activated on 16 February 1954
Redesignated 39th Air Transport Squadron, Heavy on 8 September 1957
Redesignated 39th Military Airlift Squadron on 8 January 1966
Inactivated on 31 March 1971

=== Assignments ===
- 11th Ferrying Group, 28 July 1942
- 19th Ferrying Group, 1 November 1942 – 18 October 1943
- 1607th Air Transport Group, 16 February 1954
- 1607th Air Transport Wing, 18 January 1963
- 436th Military Airlift Wing, 6 January 1966 – 31 March 1971

=== Stations ===
- Hamilton Field, California, 28 July 1942
- Hickam Field, Hawaii, 25 January 1943 – 18 October 1943
- Dover Air Force Base, Delaware, 16 February 1954 – 31 March 1971

=== Aircraft ===
- Primarily ferrying North American B-25 Mitchell and Martin B-26 Marauder, 1942–1943.
- Douglas C-54 Skymaster, 1954–1957
- Douglas C-133 Cargomaster, 1957–1971
