= 1st Airlift Squadron =

Part of US Air Force 89th Airlift Wing operating executive transport

1st Airlift Squadron

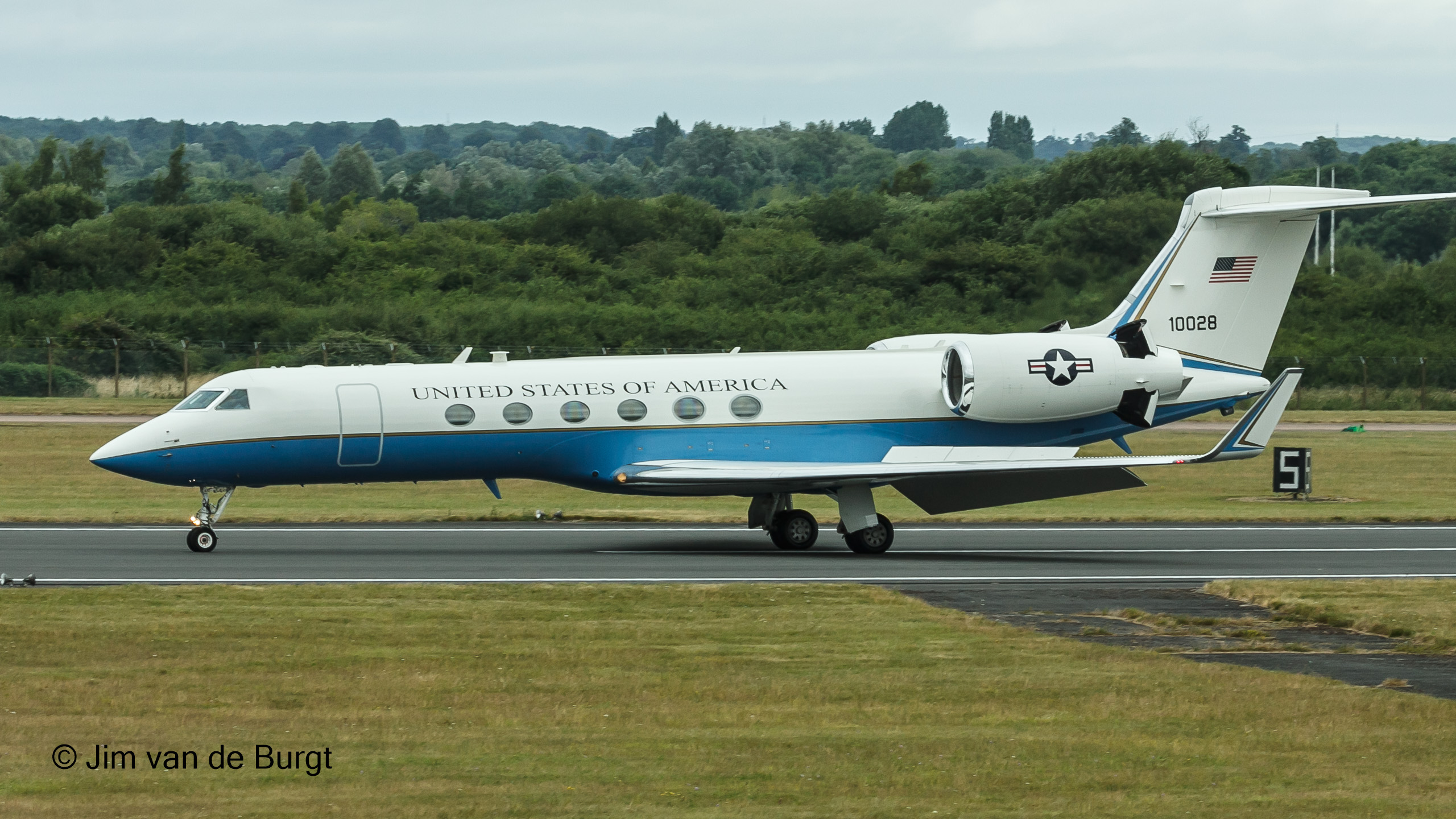
- Special Mission C-37 Gulfstream
- Active: 1944–1946; 1953–1971; 1977–present
- Country: United States
- Branch: United States Air Force
- Role: Airlift
- Part of: Air Mobility Command
- Garrison/HQ: Andrews Air Force Base
- Nickname: SAM Fox
- Engagements: China-Burma-India Theater
- Decorations: Distinguished Unit Citation; Air Force Outstanding Unit Award; Republic of Vietnam Gallantry Cross with Palm

Insignia
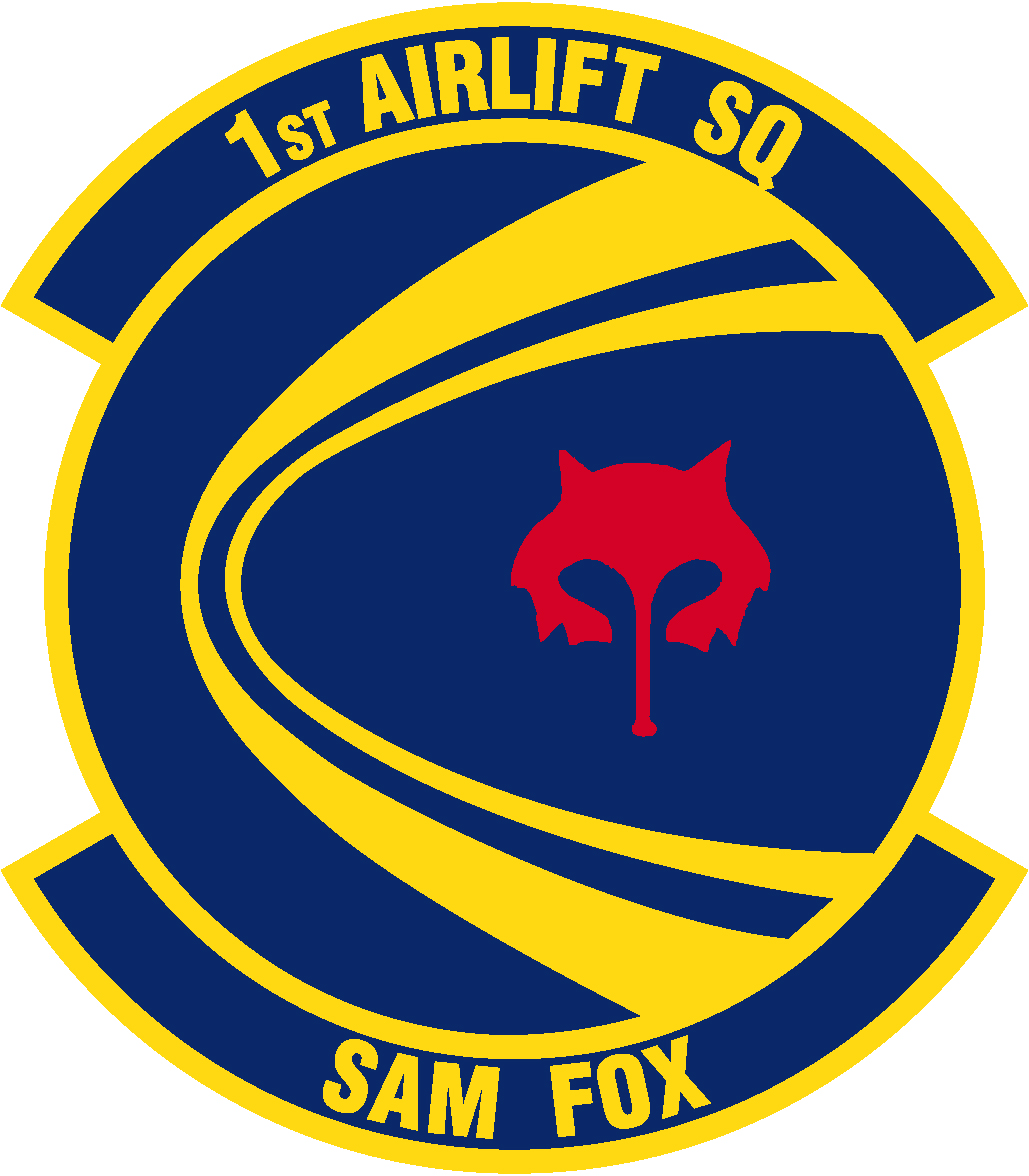
- 1st Airlift Squadron emblem (Note: Approved 16 May 1983.)

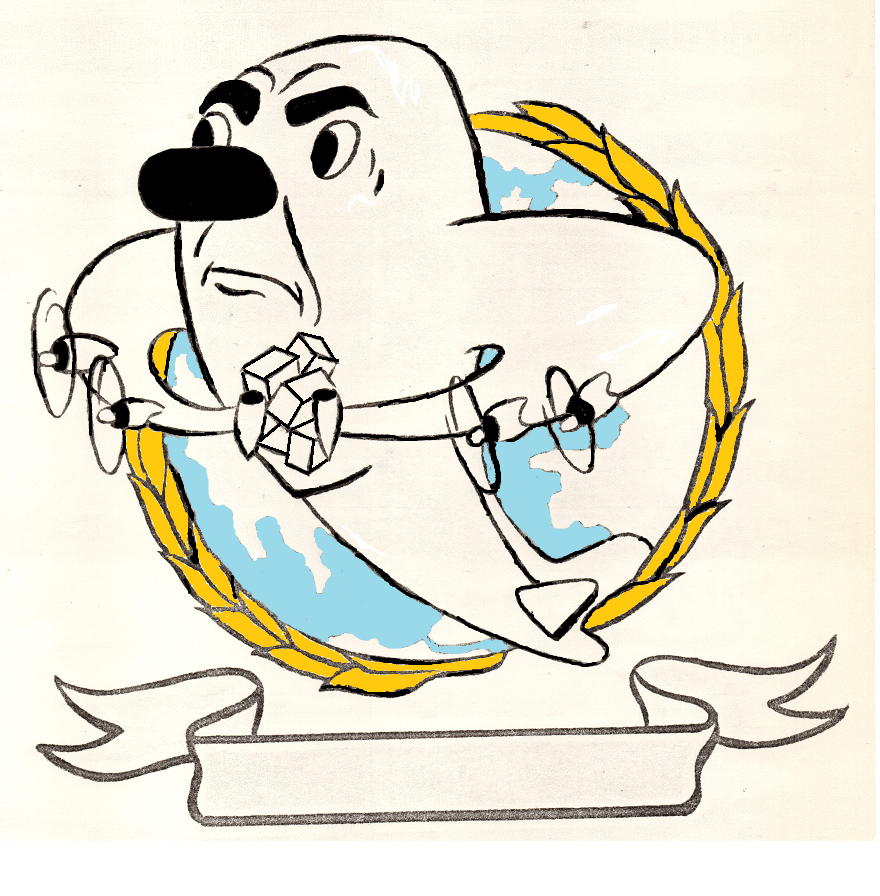
- 1st Air Transport Squadron emblem (Note: Approved 17 January 1956.)

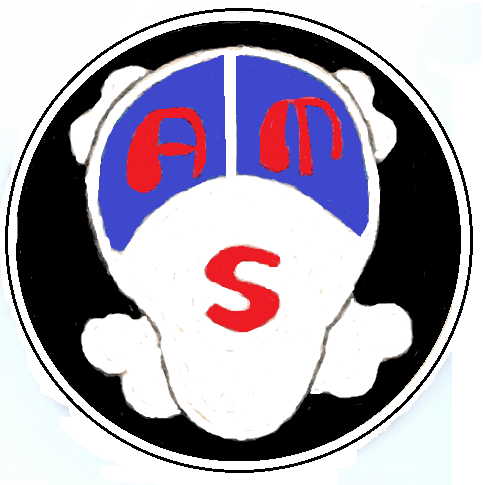
- 1st Air Transport Squadron (Mobile) emblem (Note: Unofficial, World War II.)

The 1st Airlift Squadron is part of the 89th Airlift Wing, 89th Operations Group, at Andrews Air Force Base, Maryland. It conducts transport of various high-level U.S. military and government officials.

== Mission ==
Provides global Special Air Mission (SAM) airlift, logistics, aerial port and communications for the President, Vice President, Combat Commanders, and senior leaders as tasked by the White House, Chief of Staff of the Air Force, and Air Mobility Command.

== History ==
=== World War II ===
Established under Air Transport Command in 1944 to provide aerial transportation in China-Burma-India Theater from May 1944–May 1945 and in Western Pacific from c. September–December 1945. The unit was equipped first with the Curtiss C-46 Commando, and then converted to the Consolidated C-87 Liberator Express in 1944.

=== Heavy airlift operations ===
Re-established under Military Air Transport Service in November 1953, providing airlift of personnel and equipment initially flying Douglas C-54 Skymasters. Converted to long range Douglas C-124 Globemaster IIs and provided long range heavy strategic transport on a global scale. In 1960 converted to the Douglas C-133 Cargomaster and provided very heavy strategic airlift until the end of the C-133's service in 1971.

=== Special air missions ===
Reactivated in 1977 at Andrews Air Force Base, Maryland and assigned to the Special Air Mission supporting transportation for the President and other high-ranking dignitaries of US and foreign governments, and Beechcraft C-12 Huron training for personnel from all branches of the military in 1977. At Andrews, has operated a variety of aircraft including the McDonnell Douglas VC-9 Skytrain II, C-12, Boeing VC-135 Stratolifter, Lockheed VC-140 JetStar, Boeing VC-137 and Gulfstream C-20. These aircraft were used to transport VIPs throughout the United States and around the world.

It also transported personnel to Southwest Asia from August 1990–April 1991 during Operation Desert Shield/Storm.

== Lineage ==
- Constituted as the 1st Air Transport Squadron (Mobile) on 13 March 1944

Activated on 23 March 1944
Inactivated on 25 March 1946
Disbanded on 8 October 1948

- Reconstituted as the 1st Air Transport Squadron, Medium on 1 September 1953

Activated on 18 November 1953
Redesignated 1st Air Transport Squadron, Heavy on 8 September 1954
Redesignated 1st Military Airlift Squadron on 8 January 1966
Inactivated on 30 June 1971

- Activated on 12 September 1977

Redesignated 1st Airlift Squadron on 12 July 1991

=== Assignments ===
- Caribbean Wing, Air Transport Command, 23 March 1944
- India-China Wing, Air Transport Command (later India-China Division, Air Transport Command), c. 2 May 1944 (attached to XX Bomber Command after 17 May 1944
- XX Bomber Command, 21 November 1944 (attached to 22d Air Depot Group, November - December 1944)
- United States Army Air Forces, Pacific Ocean Areas (later US Army Strategic Air Forces), c. 20 June 1945
- Eighth Air Force, 31 July 1945
- Okinawa Air Depot, 10 September 1945
- Far East Air Service Command, 9 January 1946
- IV Air Service Area Command, 15 January - 25 March 1946
- 1607th Air Base Group, 18 November 1953
- 1607th Air Transport Group, 1 January 1954
- 1607th Air Transport Wing, 18 January 1963
- 436th Military Airlift Wing, 8 January 1966 - 30 June 1971
- 89th Military Airlift Wing (later 89 Military Airlift Group, 89 Military Airlift Wing), 12 September 1977
- 89th Operations Group, 12 July 1991 – present

=== Stations ===
- Homestead Army Air Field, Florida, 23 March - 21 April 1944
- Kalaikunda Airfield, India, 3 May 1944

Air echelon operated from Kharagpur Airfield, India, 7 May - 4 August 1945

- Naha Air Base, Okinawa, 20 June 1945 - 25 March 1946
- Dover Air Force Base, Delaware, 18 November 1953 - 30 June 1971
- Andrews Air Force Base, Maryland, 12 Sept 1977–Present

=== Aircraft ===
- Curtiss C-46 Commando (1944–1946)
- Consolidated C-87 Liberator Express (1944)
- Douglas C-47 Skytrain (1945)
- Douglas C-54 Skymaster (1953–1955)
- Douglas C-124 Globemaster II (1954–1960)
- Douglas C-133 Cargomaster (1960–1971)
- Beechcraft VC–6 King Air (1977–1985)
- McDonnell Douglas VC-9 Skytrain II (1977–1988)
- Beechcraft C-12 Huron (1977 – 1994)
- Boeing VC-135 Stratolifter (1977–1991)
- Lockheed VC-140 JetStar (1977–1987)
- Gulfstream C-20 (1983–1988)
- Boeing VC-137 (1990–2001)
- Boeing C-32 (1998–present)
- Boeing C-40 Clipper (Dec 2002–present)
- C-37A (present)
