= 1600th Air Transport Group =

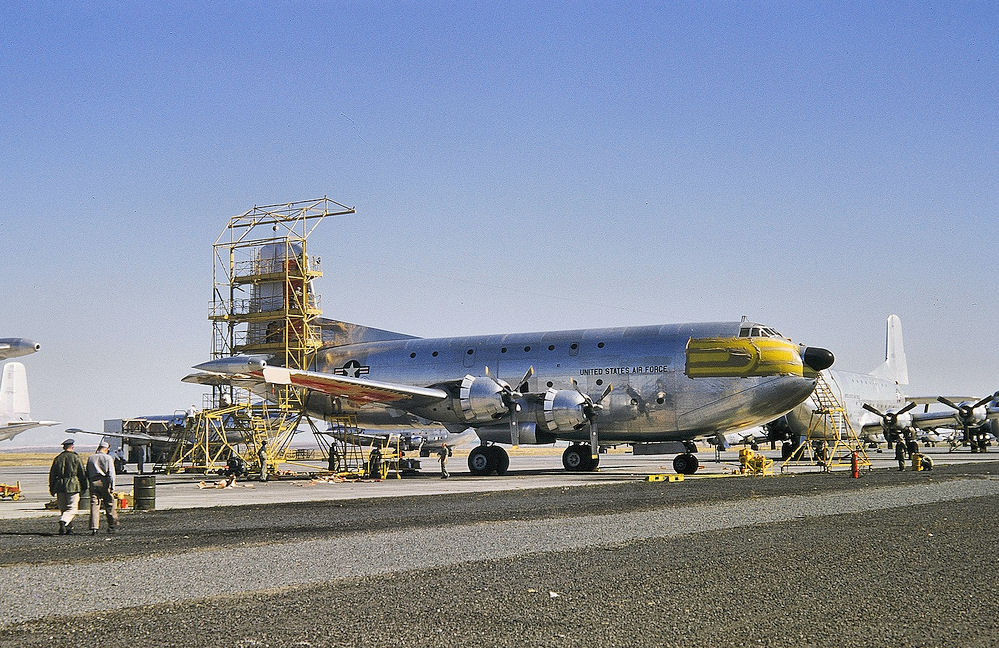
- C-124 Globemaster II about 1955
- Active: 1948–1955
- Country: United States
- Branch: United States Air Force
- Role: Airlift

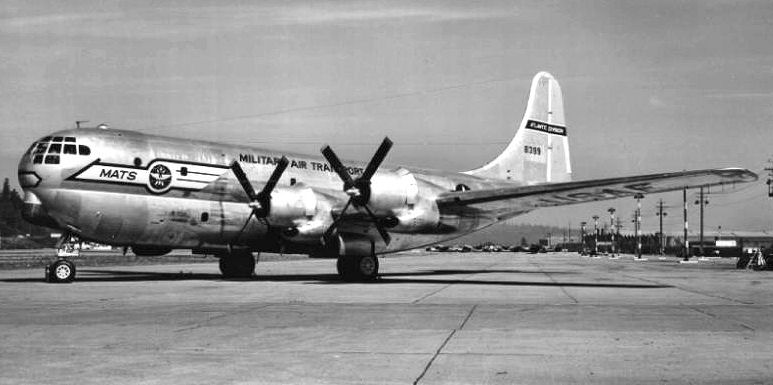
MATS Boeing C-97A Stratofreighter 48-399

The 1600th Air Transport Group is a discontinued United States Air Force unit. It was last assigned to the Atlantic Division, Military Air Transport Service at Westover Air Force Base, Massachusetts. It provided strategic airlift between the United States and Europe from its establishment as the 520th Air Transport Group in 1948 until it was discontinued on 19 June 1955.

== History ==
The group was formed from the personnel and equipment of the 1st Air Transport Group (Provisional), a Douglas C-54 Skymaster unit of Air Transport Command (ATC) at Westover when Military Air Transport Service (MATS) replaced ATC in 1948. The 1st had been organized as the operational element of the 2d Air Transport Wing (Provisional) Under the experimental wing base (Hobson Plan) organization system. When the 1600th was organized it became the operational element of the 520th Air Transport Wing (later the 1600th Air Transport Wing).

The group became Atlantic Division, Military Air Transport Service's primary strategic transport airlift provider between the United States and Europe in the late 1940s and early 1950s. In 1953, the group was transferred to the direct control of the Atlantic Division took as the wing was reduced to control of support elements in 1953 in anticipation of transfer of Westover from MATS to Strategic Air Command (SAC). The unit operated large numbers of Douglas C-124 Globemaster II heavy transports, as well as Boeing C-97 Stratofreighters. It provided passenger service on Navy Douglas R6D-1 Liftmasters and supported VIP transportation for Atlantic Division Headquarters at Westover. In the summer of 1948, the group's 16th Air Transport Squadron was reassigned directly to the Atlantic Division and in the fall it became part of Continental Division, MATS and moved to Gravelly Point, Virginia where it became a forerunner of the 89th Airlift Wing.

In July 1952, MATS replaced its table of distribution (four digit) air transport squadrons, which were controlled by the command with table of organization units whose organization was controlled by Headquarters, United States Air Force (USAF). The USAF controlled units were ferrying and transport squadrons that had been assigned to ATC during World War II. Unlike the MATS controlled squadrons that had been formed in peacetime, these units had histories that included wartime actions and could be continued even after inactivation. Each of the new squadrons assumed the mission, personnel, and equipment of the squadron it replaced.

The group was inactivated in 1955 when MATS moved its Atlantic Division headquarters and airlift operations to McGuire Air Force Base, New Jersey and Strategic Air Command assumed control of Westover.

=== Lineage ===
- Designated as the 520th Air Transport Group on 14 May 1948

Organized on 1 June 1948
Redesignated 1600th Air Transport Group on 1 October 1948
Discontinued on 25 June 1955

=== Assignments ===
- 520th Air Transport Wing (later 1600th Air Transport Wing), 1 June 1948
- Atlantic Division, Military Air Transport Service, 1 July 1953 – 25 June 1955

=== Components ===
- 11th Air Transport Squadron (later 1250th Air Transport Squadron, Heavy): 1 July 1948 – 6 June 1949 (C-54)
- 12th Air Transport Squadron (later 1251st Air Transport Squadron): 1 June 1948 – 6 June 1949 (C-54)
- 14th Air Transport Squadron (later 1252d Air Transport Squadron): 1 July 1948 – 20 July 1952
- 15th Air Transport Squadron: 1 Jun 1948 (later 1253d Air Transport Squadron, Heavy), 1 July 1948 – 20 July 1952
- 15th Air Transport Squadron, Heavy: (Note: This squadron assumed the assets of the second 1251st Air Transport Squadron. This squadron is not related to the 15th Air Transport Squadron that became the 1253d Air Transport Squadron.) 20 Jul 1952 – 20 Apr 1955 (C-124)
- 16th Air Transport Squadron: 1 June 1948 – 1 July 1948 (C-54)
- 20th Air Transport Squadron, Medium (later 20th Air Transport Squadron, Heavy: (Note: This squadron assumed the assets of 1255th Air Transport Squadron.) 20 July 1952 – 20 May 1955 (C-124)
- 29th Air Transport Squadron, Medium (later 29th Air Transport Squadron, Heavy): (Note: This squadron assumed the assets of 1257th Air Transport Squadron.) 20 Jul 1952 – 13 Apr 1955 (C-124)
- 30th Air Transport Squadron, Heavy (later 30th Air Transport Squadron, Medium): 20 July 1952 – 5 May 1955 (C-118)
- 31st Air Transport Squadron, Heavy: 20 July 1952 – 9 May 1955 (C-124)
- 1257th Air Transport Squadron: 24 May 1950 – 20 July 1952 (C-54)
- 1282d Air Transport Squadron, Medium: 23 June 1951 – 1 September 1953 (C-97)
- Squadron VR-6 (USN), 3 August 1949 – 10 June 1955 (R6D-1)

=== Stations ===
- Westover Air Force Base, Massachusetts, 1 June 1948 – 19 June 1955

=== Aircraft ===
- Douglas C-54 Skymaster, 1947–1952
- Boeing C-97 Stratofreighter, 1951–1953
- Douglas C-124 Globemaster II, 1952–1955
- Dougas R6D Liftmaster, 1949–1955
