= 31st Airlift Squadron =

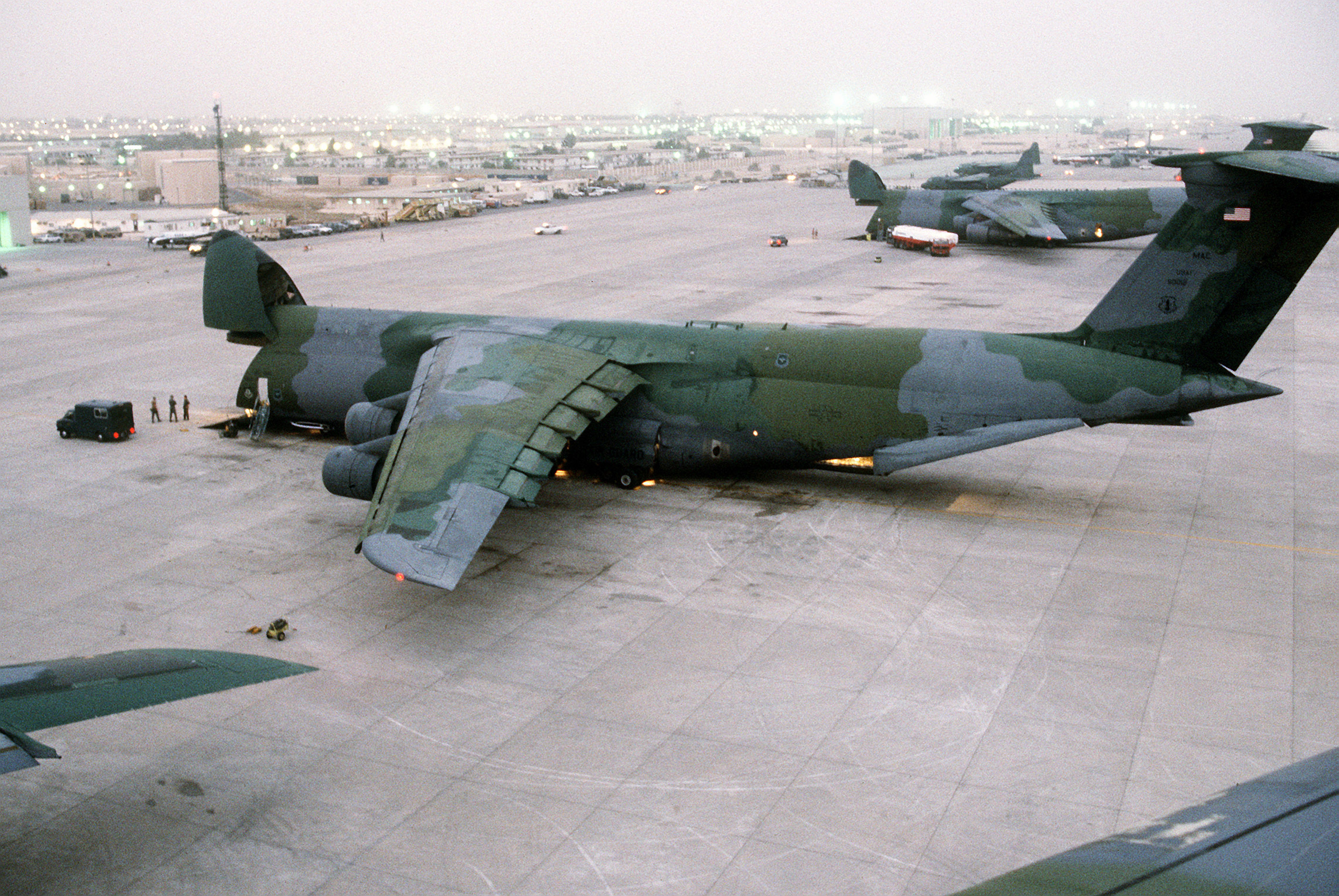
- C-5 Galaxy aircraft unloading during Operation Desert Storm
- Active: 1942–1943; 1952–1969; 1989–1994
- Country: United States
- Branch: United States Air Force
- Role: Airlift
- Mottos: Temporem Ubique (Latin for 'Anytime, Anywhere')

Insignia
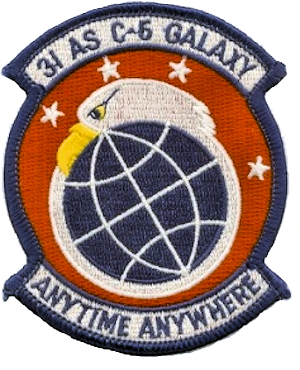
- Patch with 31st Airlift Squadron emblem

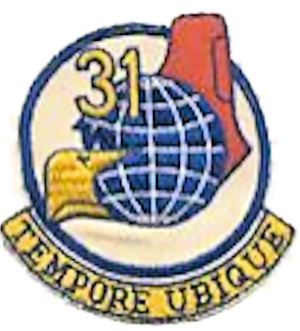
- Patch with 31st Air Transport Squadron emblem

The 31st Airlift Squadron is an inactive United States Air Force unit. Its last was assigned to the 436th Operations Group, Air Mobility Command, stationed at Dover Air Force Base, Delaware. It was inactivated on 14 January 1994.

== History ==
The unit was first activated during World War II as a ferrying organization. It operated on the North Atlantic Ferrying Route until 1943, when it was disbanded and replaced by Station 19, North Atlantic Wing, Air Transport Command, as part of a broader reorganization of the Air Transport Command.

In 1952, the unit was reactivated as a Douglas C-124 Globemaster II heavy airlift squadron. During this period, it conducted long-range strategic airlift missions worldwide for the Military Air Transport Service, which later became the Military Airlift Command. The squadron remained active until 1969, when it was inactivated following the retirement of the C-124 aircraft.

The unit was reactivated once again in 1989 as a Lockheed C-5 Galaxy strategic airlift squadron, coinciding with the beginning of C-5B production. It carried out global transport missions, delivering equipment and personnel across the world until it was inactivated after the end of the Cold War.

=== Lineage ===
- Constituted as the 31st Ferrying Squadron c. 9 July 1942

Activated on 25 July 1942
Redesignated 31st Transport Squadron c. 24 March 1943
Disbanded on 1 September 1943
Reconstituted as the 31st Air Transport Squadron, Heavy on 20 June 1952
Activated on 20 July 1952
Redesignated 31st Troop Carrier Squadron, Heavy on 1 June 1965
Redesignated 31st Military Airlift Squadron on 8 January 1966
Inactivated on 8 April 1969
Reactivated on 1 October 1989
Redesignated 31st Airlift Squadron on 1 December 1991
Inactivated on 14 January 1994

=== Assignments ===
- 8th Ferrying Group (later 8th Transport Group), 25 July 1942 – 1 September 1943
- 1600th Air Transport Group, 20 July 1952
- 1607th Air Transport Wing, 1 July 1955
- 436th Military Airlift Wing, 8 January 1966 – 1 April 1969
- 436th Military Airlift Wing, 1 October 1989
- 436th Operations Group, 1 December 1991 – 14 January 1994

=== Stations ===
- Presque Isle Army Air Field, Maine, 25 July 1942
- Meeks Field, Iceland, August 1942 – 1 September 1943
- Westover Air Force Base, Massachusetts, 20 July 1952
- Dover Air Force Base, Delaware, 19 June 1955 – 1 April 1969
- Dover Air Force Base, Delaware, 1 October 1989 – 14 January 1994

=== Aircraft ===
- Douglas C-124 Globemaster II, 1952–1966, 1966–1969
- Lockheed C-5 Galaxy, 1989–1994
