= 1607th Air Transport Wing =

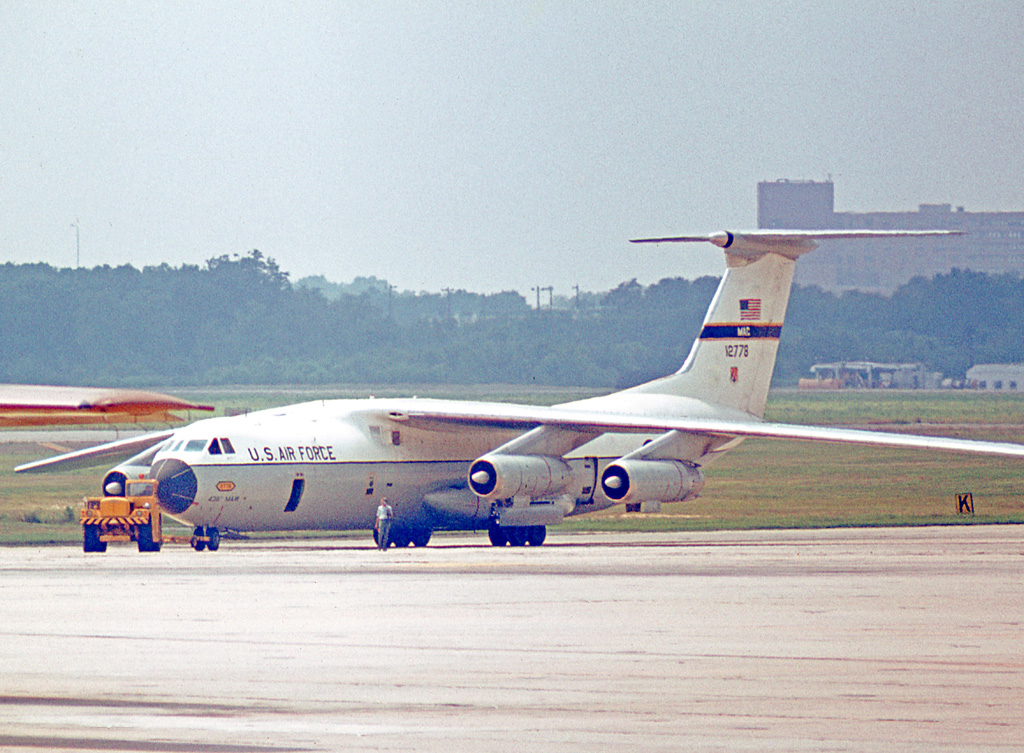
- C-141A Starlifter at Dover AFB (Note: Aircraft is Lockheed C-141A-5-LM Starlifter, serial 61-2778. It was later modified as a C-141B, then a C-141C. It was severely damaged in a ground accident at Memphis Municipal Airport in 2001. Dirkx, Marco (25 July 2023). "1962 USAF Serial Numbers". Joe Baugher’s Serial Number List.)
- Active: 1954–1966
- Country: United States
- Branch: United States Air Force
- Role: Airlift
- Part of: Military Air Transport Service
- Motto: Robustum Auxilium (Latin for 'Powerful Support')

Insignia
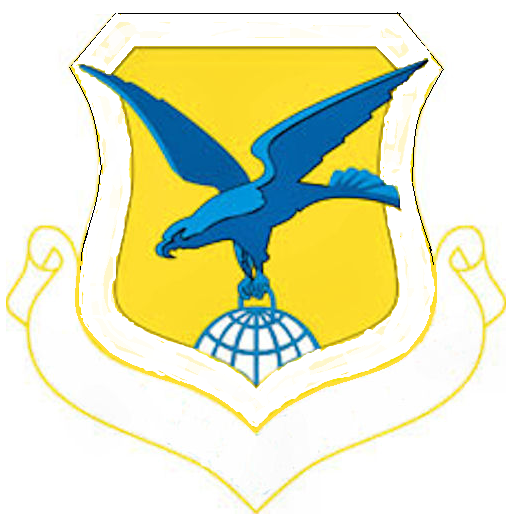
- 1607th Air Transport Wing Emblem

The 1607th Air Transport Wing is an inactive United States Air Force unit. It was last assigned to Eastern Transport Air Force at Dover Air Force Base, Delaware. It was inactivated on 8 January 1966 and its mission, personnel and equipment were transferred to the 436th Military Airlift Wing. The wing was organized in January 1954, as Dover was expanding to become an aerial port of embarkation for the east coast of the United States. It executed airlift missions for its tenure at Dover.

== History ==
=== Background ===
Dover Air Force Base, a World War II station, was reactivated in 1951 as an Air Defense Command (ADC) fighter base, and the 80th Air Base Squadron was activated in February 1952 as the host organization at Dover. In April, ADC transferred the base and the 80th Squadron to Military Air Transport Service (MATS), which had moved its 1737th Ferrying Squadron there in January. Congress had appropriated $25 million to expand Dover as a supplemental MATS east coast aerial port of embarkation and a foreign clearing base for ferrying flights headed to Europe, the Caribbean, and other destinations.

=== Airlift operations ===
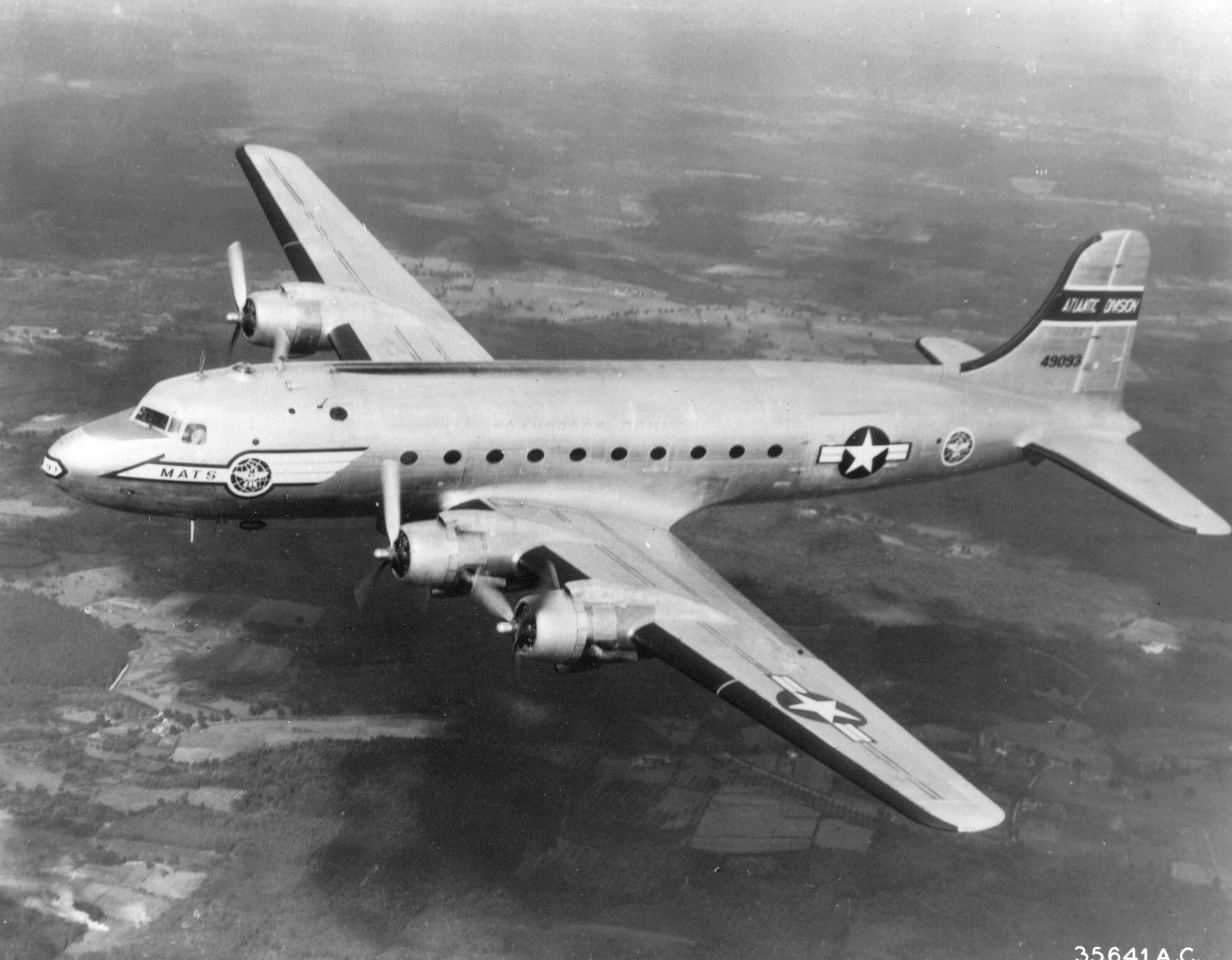
A C-54 Skymaster of the Atlantic Division, MATs

As the base expanded, in August 1953, the 80th Squadron was relaced by the larger 1607th Air Base Group. Airlift operations began when the first two two transport squadrons, the 1st and 21st Air Transport Squadrons, which flew the Douglas C-54 Skymaster, activated in November. On 1 January 1954, the 1607th Air Transport Wing was organized and the 1607th Air Base Group was assigned to it. The two flying squadrons were assigned to the new 1607th Air Transport Group, and in February, the 1607th Field Maintenance Squadron was organized as part of the wing. The wing's initial mission was "to command, operate, administer and maintain Dover Air Force Base and such organizations, installations and facilities as may be assigned by proper authority for the purpose of transporting by air, personnel, material, mail, strategic materials and other cargoes for all agencies of the Department of Defense and as authorized for other government agencies of the United States, subject to priorities and policies established by higher headquarters". (Note: Quotation marks in source (Flying History of the 1607th Wing), but original source of quotation is not given.) The he first transport mission of the newly activated wing was accomplished when a C-54 operated by the 1st Air Transport Squadron (Medium) delivered a 9,000 pound radio mast to Harmon Air Force Base, Newfoundland.

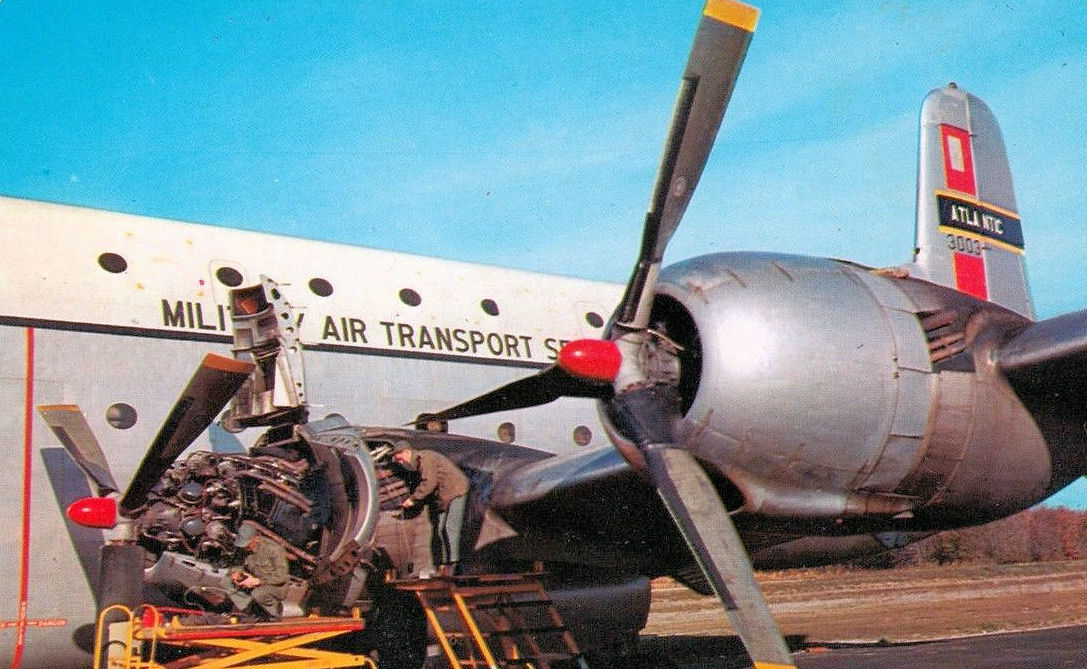
C-124 Globemaster II engine maintenance

In February 1954, wing operations expanded when the 39th and the 45th Air Transport Squadrons were activated under the 1607th Air Transport Group, followed in March by the 40th Air Transport Squadron. On 1 May 1954, the first Douglas C-124 Globemaster II arrived at Dover and on 12 June, the 45th Air Transport Squadron flew the first C-124 transport mission, airlifting five engines to Harmon and a 12,000 pound spool of cable to Torbay Air Base, Newfoundland. In September, the 1st and 21st Squadrons replaced their C-54s with the C-124.

In 1955, when MATS transferred Westover Air Force Base, Massachusetts to Strategic Air Command, the 15th, 20th and 31st Air Transport Squadrons moved to Dover. Shortly after these squadrons relocated, the 21st and 45th Squadrons were inactivated and transferred their resources to the new units. Starting in May 1955, the wing supported the construction of the Distant Early Warning Line in northern Canada in Project Ice Cube. It also flew resupply missions to the northernmost weather outposts at Nord, Greenland and Alert, both within 500 miles of the North Pole. In March 1956, the wing airlifted 22,000 pounds of emergency polio equipment and supplies to Buenos Aires, Argentina to help combat a polio outbreak. In September 1957, it airlifted forty vehicles equipped with 109 mm weapons were carried in five wing C-124s to Amman, Jordan in Operation Good Hope.

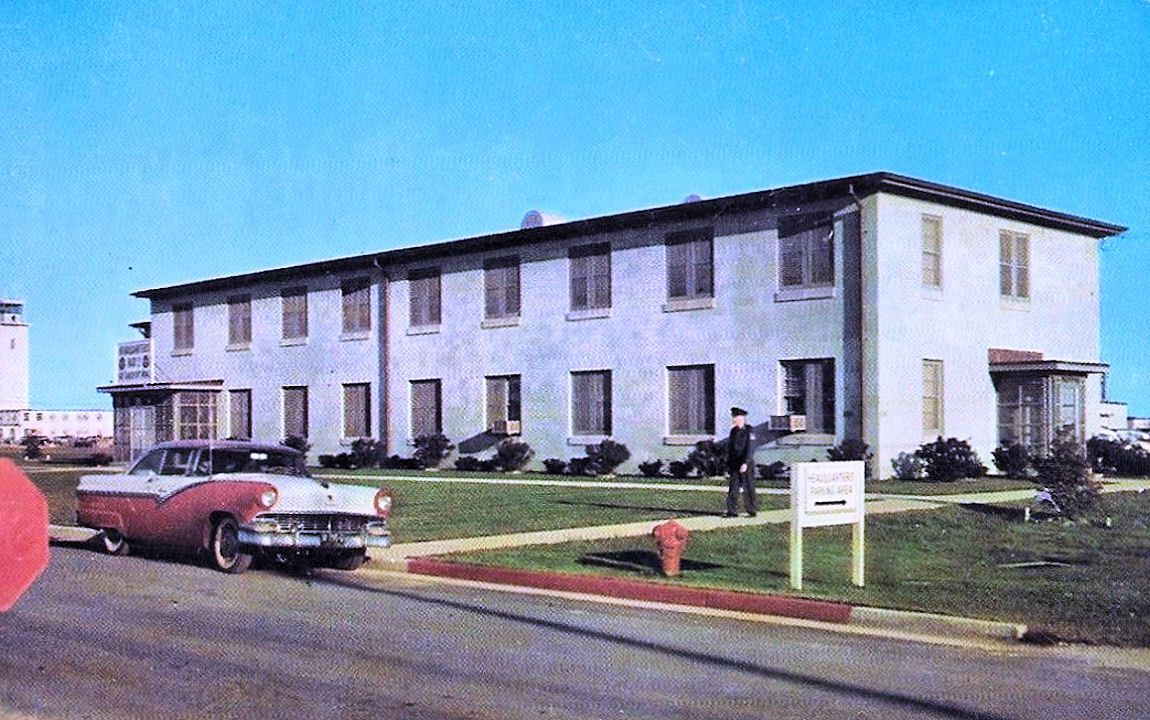
Headquarters 1607th Air Transport Wing, about 1960

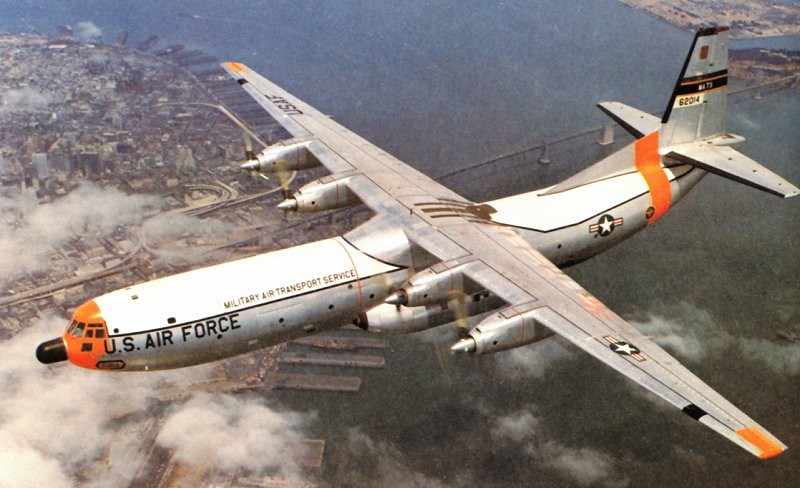
Wing C-133A Cargomaster (Note: Aircraft is Douglas C-133A-30-DL Cargomaster, serial 56-2014. This plane crashed on takeoff from Goose Bay Airport on 7 May 1964, with the loss of all on board. Dirkx, Marco (23 September 2025). "1956 USAF Serial Numbers". Joe Baugher’s Serial Number List.)

The 40th was inactivated in December 1960 and its personnel were absorbed into the other units. With the arrival of the Douglas C-133 Cargomaster in 1957, the 39th Air Transport Squadron converted to the C-133, with the 1st Air Transport Squadron following in 1960. In December 1958, a wing AFB C-133 set a record for airlifting the heaviest load when it carried 118,000 pounds of cargo to an altitude of 10,000 feet, breaking the former world record held by a Soviet Tupolev Tu-104.

The wing participared in joint mobility exercises and global operations during the Cold War, including an exercise that deployed 22,000 combat Army troops and 12,000 tons of gear from stateside bases to Puerto Rico; the deployment of the 101st Airborne Division from Fort Campbell, Kentucky to bases in Europe and the deployment of a full Army division from Texas to Germany.

In July 1960, during the crisis following the independence of the Republic of Congo, the wing began evacuating American citizens from the area. Shortly thereafter, the United Nations resolved to send an international force of peace keeping troops to the Congo and President Dwight D. Eisenhower provided airlift support in Operation New Tape. The wing supported the deployment of these forces and their rotation over the next four years as wekk as airlifting food and medical supplies, operating initially through a provisional MATS organization in France.

On 7 February 1960, a Dover C-124 with a 15th Air Transport Squadron aircrew flew a record breaking non-stop flight from Hickam Air Force Base, Hawaii to Dover in eighteen hours and forty minutes. It flew mercy missions following earthquakes in Santiago, Chile in 1960, and to Alaska after an earthquake in 1964.

During the Cuban Missile Crisis of 1962, the wing supported the build-up of forces in the southeastern United States. It worked at peak capacity airlifting troops and supplies to Florida and Guantanamo Bay Naval Base.

On 18 January 1963, the wing was reorganized under the dual deputy organization. This reorganization resulted in the discontinuance of the 1607th Air Transport and Maintenance Groups, and the flying squadrons were assigned directly to the wing. In January 1965, the 15th Air Transport Squadron inactivated and the 9th Troop Carrier Squadron, operating Lockheed C-130 Hercules aircraft. The 20th and 31st Air Transport Squadrons were also redesignated troop carrier squadrons, although the 20th reverted to its previous designation in July.

On 1 February 1965, MATS announced that Dover was selected as one of four bases where the Lockheed C-141 Starlifter would be tested under a program called "Lead the Force". The first C-141 arrived at Dover Air Force Base on 18 August 1965 and was assigned to the 20th Air Transport Squadron.

During its twelve-year history at Dover, the 1607th ATW accumulated 1,076,483 transport flying hours or an approximate equivalent distance of 235 million nautical miles. On 8 January 1966, the 1607th was discontinued and the 436th Military Airlift Wing was activated MATS was replaced by Military Airlift Command. Its C-124 Globemasters, C-133 Cargomasters and Lockheed C-141 Starlifters were transferred.

== Lineage ==
- Designated as the 1607th Air Transport Wing and organized on 1 January 1954

Redesignated 1607th Air Transport Wing, Heavy on 20 September 1954
Discontinued on 8 January 1966

=== Assignment ===
- Atlantic Division, MATS (later Eastern Air Transport Force, Twenty-First Air Force), 1 January 1954 – 8 January 1966

=== Components ===
==== Groups ====
- 1607th Air Base Group, 1 January 1954 – 18 January 1963
- 1607th Air Transport Group, 1 January 1954 – 18 January 1963
- 1607th Maintenance Group, 1 November 1955 – 18 January 1963

==== Operational Squadrons ====
- 1st Air Transport Squadron, 18 January 1963 – 8 January 1966
- 39th Air Transport Squadron, 18 January 1963 – 8 January 1966
- 15th Air Transport Squadron, 18 January 1963 – 1 January 1965
- 20th Air Transport Squadron, 18 January 1963 – 8 January 1966
- 31st Air Transport Squadron, 18 January 1963 – 8 January 1966
- 9th Troop Carrier Squadron, 1 January 1965 – 8 January 1966

==== Support Squadrons ====
- 1607th Aerial Port Squadron, 18 January 1963 – 8 January 1966
- 1607th Communications and Electronics Maintenance Squadron, 18 January 1963 – 8 January 1966
- 1607th Maintenance Squadron (later 1607th Field Maintenance Squadron), 1 February 1954 – 1 November 1955, 18 January 1963 – 8 January 1966
- 1607th Medical Squadron (later 1607th USAF Infirmary, 1607th USAF Hospital), 1 January 1954 – 8 January 1966
- 1607th Organizational Maintenance Squadron, 18 January 1963 – 8 January 1966
- 1617th Organizational Maintenance Squadron, 18 January 1963 – 8 January 1966
- 1627th Organizational Maintenance Squadron, 1 July 1965 – 8 January 1966

=== Stations ===
- Dover Air Force Base, Delaware, 1 January 1954 – 8 January 1966

=== Aircraft ===
- Douglas C-54 Skymaster, 1953–1957
- Douglas C-124C Globemaster II, 1954–1966
- Douglas C-133 Cargomaster, 1957–1966
- Lockheed C-141 Starlifter, 1965–1966

=== Commanders ===
- Col Paul A. Zartman, 1 Jan 1954 – 22 June 1954
- Col Alfred H. Dehle, 23 June 1954 – 27 Jul 1954
- Brig Gen Francis C. Gideon, 28 Jul 1954 – 25 Aug 1958
- Col Andrew B. Cannon, 26 Aug 1958 – 31 Aug 1958
- Brig Gen Robert J. Goewey, 1 Sep 1958 – 29 Aug 1960
- Col Whiteford C. Mauldin, 30 Aug 1960 – 30 Jun 1964
- Col David E. Daniel, 1 Jul 1964 – 6 Apr 1965
- Brig Gen John B. Wallace, 7 Apr 1965 – 8 Jan 1966
