= Canton Island Airport =

Airport in Canton Island, Kiribati

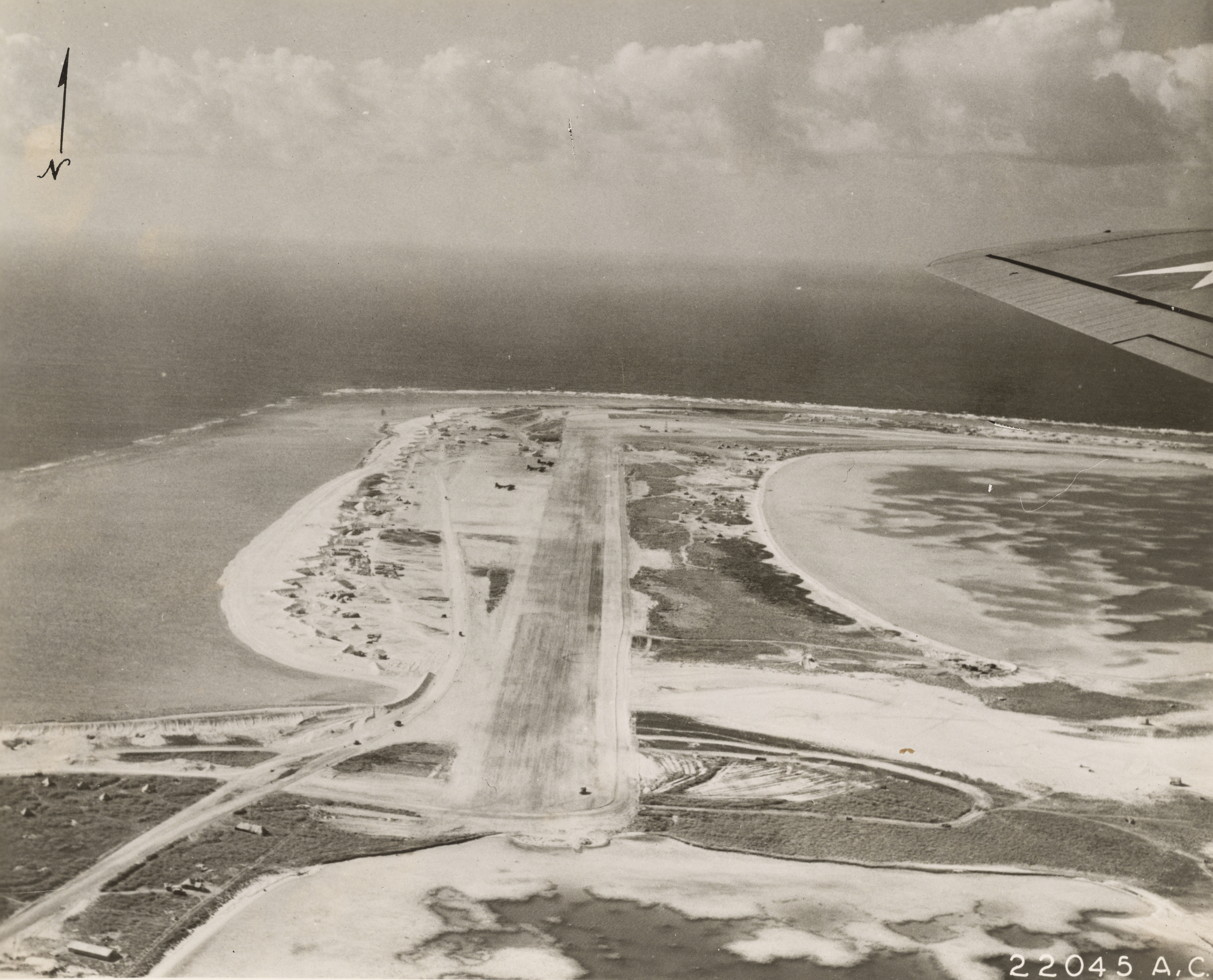
- Airstrip in 1942
- IATA: CIS; ICAO: PCIS

Summary
- Airport type: Public
- Location: Canton Island
- Opened: 14 July 1940
- Closed: January 1968
- Time zone: PHOT (UTC+13:00)
- Elevation AMSL: 9 ft / 3 m
- Coordinates: 02°46′09″S 171°42′19″W
- Interactive map of Canton Island Airport

Runways
Direction	Length		Surface
Direction	ft	m	Surface
09/27	6,230	1,899	Asphalt

Location of the Phoenix Islands in the Pacific Ocean

Canton Island Airport (IATA: CIS, ICAO: PCIS) is an airport located on Canton Island, a sparsely populated island in the Phoenix Islands of the Republic of Kiribati. It has a single asphalt runway measuring 6,230 feet (1,900 m) in length. Once a major stop on commercial trans-Pacific airline routes, today the airport is available for emergency use only.

== Construction ==
A low, narrow rim of land surrounding a large, shallow lagoon, at its widest to the west, the atoll is 4½ miles, narrowing to the east over a distance of just 9 miles (14 km). The airfield was built on the island's northwestern point between 1938 and 1939 by Pan American Airways as a stopover on their route from Hawaii to New Zealand. By 14 July 1940 the base was ready for the beginning of scheduled service by Pan American clippers en route to Auckland.

== World War II ==
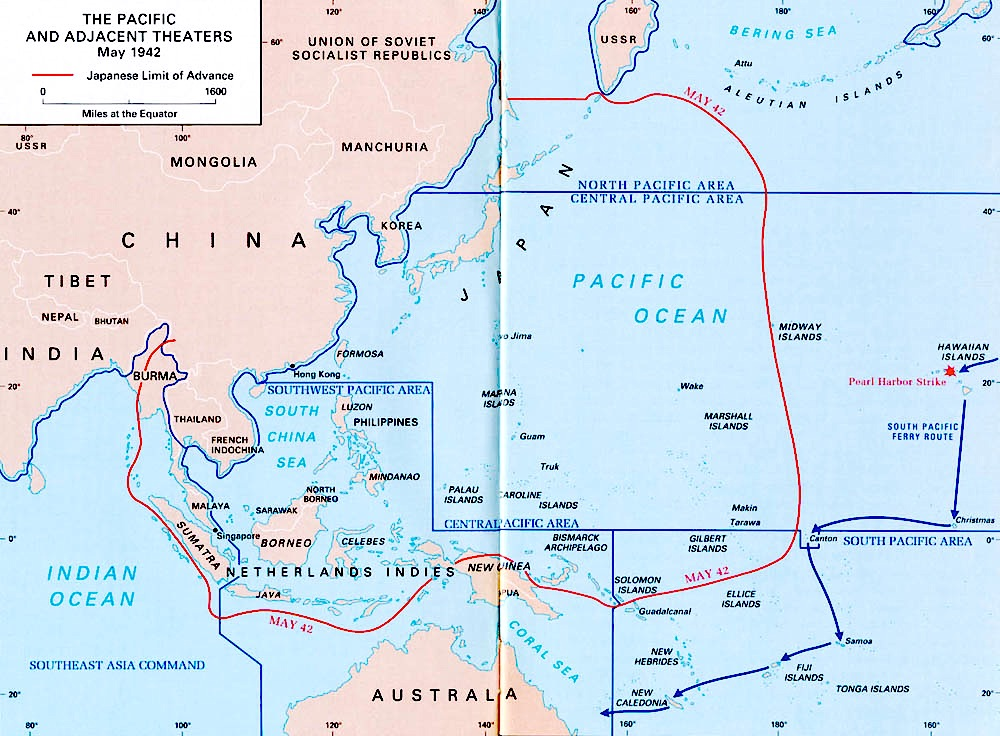
Pacific & Adjacent areas key air ferry route (1942)

The Pan American central air route from Hawaii to the Philippines and Asia, stopping at Midway Atoll, Wake Island and Guam, passed through the Japanese controlled islands which caused serious concerns about its safety in 1941 even though the US Army had reinforced the Philippines with a flight of B-17 bombers by way of Midway, Wake and Port Moresby in September. The United States Department of War approved a plan with orders effective 4 October 1941 to build an alternate air ferry route skirting the mandated islands and capable of handling planes such as the B-17s. While a commercial firm was engaged for most of the island stops of the new route, the Canton airfield was under construction by a team of Army Engineers and civilian contractors with a target opening of bomber capability by January 1942. The effort began on 3 November with a transport carrying 130 troops and civilian contractors and towing four barges of equipment departed Honolulu arriving at the island 14 November after losing two of the barges. By 28 December, despite considerable difficulties, the field was declared suitable to accommodate heavy bombers. On 31 January 1942 garrison forces for the island, then codenamed "HOLLY," sailed from San Francisco.

The airport was initially used by the 40th Ferrying Squadron as an airfield for moving combat aircraft to forward combat units. The airfield saw various aircraft, including A-20s, B-17s, B-24s, B-25s, B-26s, P-38s, P-40s, C-46s and C-47s transit the base. In February 1943, the long-range B-24 bombers of the 392d Bombardment Squadron were sent to the airfield. The Imperial Japanese Army did not invade Canton, although the airfield was shelled on 1 November 1943 by Japanese submarine I-36. After the war, it was returned to civilian control.

== Post-war history ==
Canton Island airport continued to see use during the 1950s as a trans-Pacific stopover for DC-4, DC-6B and DC-7C aircraft for Pan American World Airways (Pan Am), British Commonwealth Pacific Airlines, Qantas and Canadian Pacific Airlines (with South Pacific Air Lines also offering flag stop passenger service in 1962 operated with Lockheed L-1049 Super Constellation propliners between Honolulu and Pago Pago). According to its June 1, 1956 worldwide system timetable, Pan American World Airways was serving the airport with Boeing 377 Stratocruiser propliners with a routings of San Francisco or Los Angeles - Honolulu - Canton Island - Nadi (previously known as Nandi in Fiji) - Sydney operated four days a week. However, with the advent of long-range jet aircraft during the 1960s, the air carrier need for the island faded, and the final commercial service landed in November 1965. The airport's facilities were gradually wound down and it was officially closed in January 1968. From 1969 it saw occasional use in conjunction with subsequent U.S. government projects on the island (largely related to the human spaceflight program, in particular Project Mercury and Project Gemini), but with the conclusion of these endeavours, the airport was finally closed in 1976, although Air Tungaru used it as an occasional refuelling stop on its Tarawa-Kiritimati-Honolulu route well into the 1990s. It remains available as an emergency landing field.

== See also ==
- USAAF in the Central Pacific
