= 20th Airlift Squadron =

20th Airlift Squadron

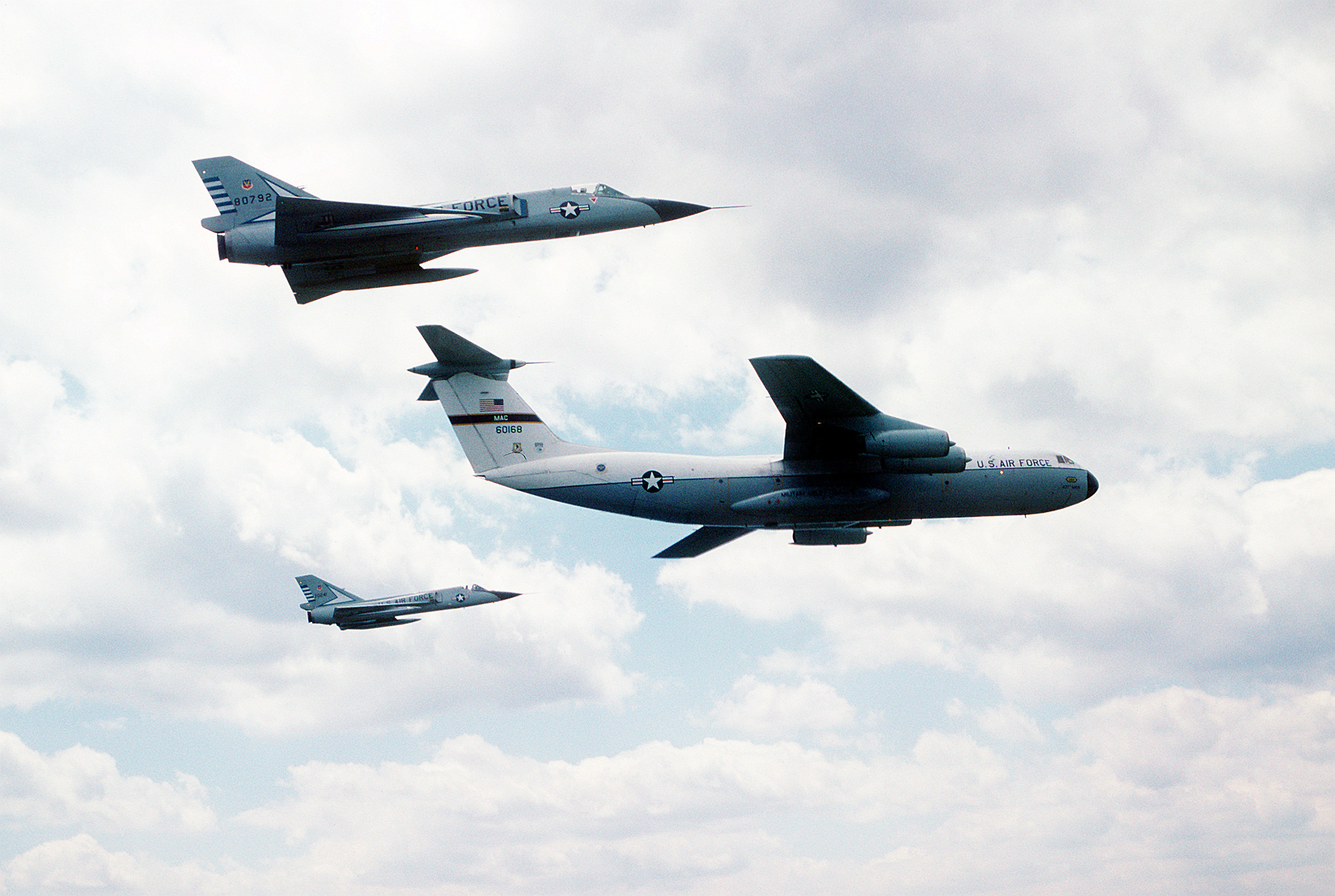
- 437th Military Airlift Wing C-141 escorted by F-106s in 1980
- Active: 1942–1943; 1954–1997
- Country: United States
- Branch: United States Air Force
- Role: Strategic airlift
- Part of: Air Mobility Command
- Nickname: Double X Squadron
- Motto: Firmitas per Mobilitatem (Latin for 'Strength Through Mobility')
- Engagements: American Defense (World War II); Southwest Asia Service; Operation Just Cause
- Decorations: Air Force Outstanding Unit Award; Republic of Vietnam Gallantry Cross with Palm

Insignia
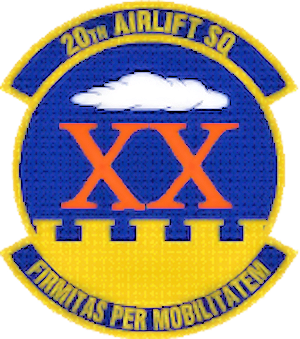
- 20th Airlift Squadron emblem (Note: Modified to place on a disc as required for squadron emblems. Description: on a disc Azure, a Roman numeral XX Tenne, in fess , between a cloud formation in chief, proper, and a point in base embattled Or, edged of the last [color].)

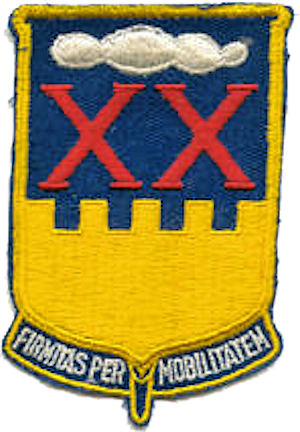
- Patch with 20th Air Transport Squadron emblem (Note: Approved 5 December 1956.)

The 20th Airlift Squadron is an inactive United States Air Force unit. Its last assignment was to the 60th Operations Group of Air Mobility Command at Travis Air Force Base, California, where it was inactivated on 31 December 1997.

The squadron was first activated in 1942 as the 20th Air Corps Ferrying Squadron and ferried various aircraft on the North Atlantic ferrying route until 1943, when it was replaced by Station 3, North Atlantic Wing, Air Transport Command in a reorganization of Air Transport Command units.

The squadron was activated again in 1952 as the 20th Air Transport Squadron when Military Air Transport Service (MATS) replaced its Major Command controlled (four digit) airlift squadrons with Air Force controlled squadrons. When MATS turned Westover Air Force Base over to Strategic Air Command, the squadron moved to Dover Air Force Base. It upgraded to jet-propelled Lockheed C-141 Starlifters in 1965, and flew them until it was inactivated in 1997.

== History ==
=== World War II ===
The squadron was first activated at Houlton Army Air Base, Maine, a departure station for the North Atlantic ferrying route, in March 1942 as the 20th Air Corps Ferrying Squadron. The squadron was initially assigned directly to Air Corps Ferrying Command, but in June, Ferrying Command organized the 23d Army Air Forces Ferrying Wing to manage its units on the North Atlantic route and the squadron was reassigned to it. In March 1943, the squadron became the 20th Transport Squadron.

The squadron flew and managed the ferrying of various aircraft, including Boeing B-17 Flying Fortresses and Lockheed P-38 Lightnings and participated in Operation Bolero, the buildup of United States forces in the United Kingdom. On 1 September 1943, the 20th disbanded and combined with support units at Houlton to form Station 3, North Atlantic Wing, Air Transport Command.

=== Strategic airlift ===
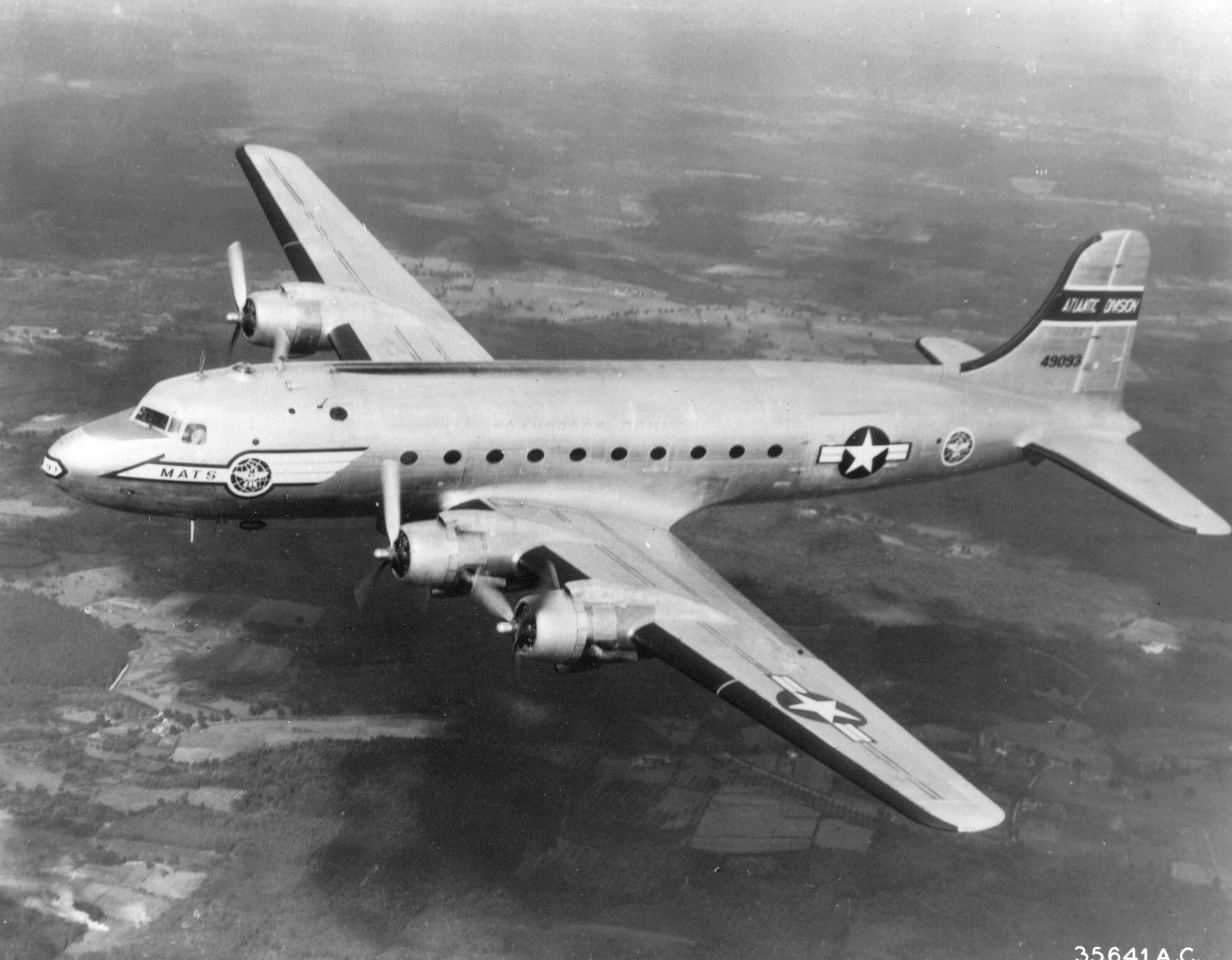
MATS C-54 Skymaster

In 1952, Military Air Transport Service (MATS) replaced its Major Command controlled (four-digit) air transport squadrons with squadrons that had served during World War II. As part of this conversion, the 20th was reconstituted as the 20th Air Transport Squadron (Note: The squadron is not related to the 20th Air Transport Squadron organized at Wheelus Air Base on 1 June 1948 and redesignated 1261st Air Transport Squadron on 1 October 1948. "Abstract, History Wheelus Air Base June 1948". Air Force History Index..) and absorbed the personnel and Douglas C-54 Skymasters of the 1257th Air Transport Squadron at Westover Air Force Base, Massachusetts in July 1952. The squadron's mission was to provide inter-theater and strategic airlift to Europe, North Africa and Canada.

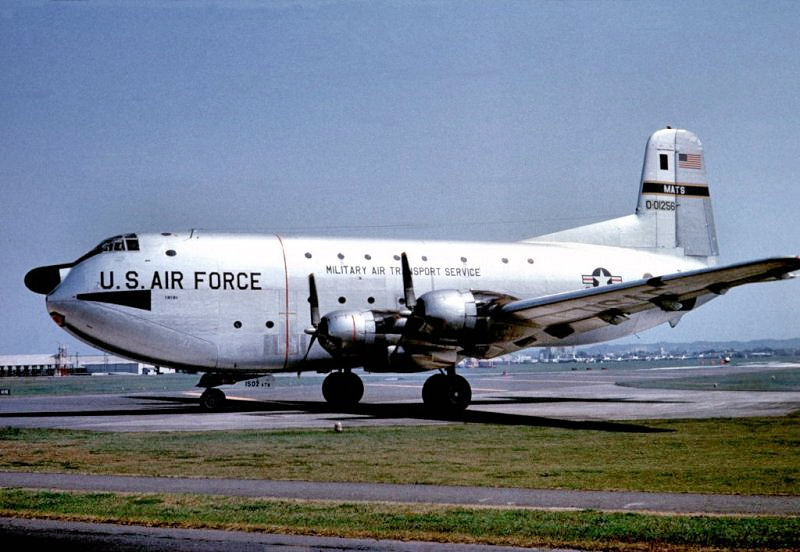
MATS C-124 Globemaster II (Note: Aircraft is Douglas C-124A-DL Globemaster II serial 50-1256.)

The squadron was redesignated the 20th Air Transport Squadron, Heavy, on 18 April 1954, recognizing the squadron's transition into the larger Douglas C-124 Globemaster II. The 20th moved to Dover Air Force Base, Delaware on 15 May 1955 and became part of the 1607th Air Transport Group, located at Dover.

When MATS adopted the dual deputy organization, the 1607th Air Transport Group was discontinued and the squadron was assigned directly to the 1607th Air Transport Wing on 18 January 1963. The unit was briefly redesignated as the 20th Troop Carrier Squadron, Heavy on 1 January 1965. It returned its designation to the 20th Air Transport Squadron, Heavy, on 1 July 1965 as the squadron transitioned to the Lockheed C-141 Starlifter. The Starlifter brought a mission change to that of providing worldwide airlift, which included support of operations in Southeast Asia.

In January 1966, Military Airlift Command replaced MATS. In this reorganization, the 436th Military Airlift Wing replaced the 1607th Air Transport Wing and the squadron was redesignated the 20th Military Airlift Squadron.

The next changes to the 20th would not take place until August 1973, when the squadron moved to Charleston Air Force Base, South Carolina and was reassigned to the base's 437th Military Airlift Wing. At Charleston, the squadron provided support for the evacuation of South Vietnam in April 1975. The 20th took a number of contingency operations while located at Charleston, including Operation Urgent Fury, the invasion of Grenada from October through December 1983. In December 1989, the squadron provided airlift support for Operation Just Cause, the replacement of Manuel Noriega as the ruler of Panama. Starting in August 1990, the squadron deployed to support Operation Desert Shield and its support continued through the Gulf War until December 1991.

On 1 October 1991, the squadron was redesignated the 20 Airlift Squadron and reassigned to the 437th Operations Group. Two years later, the 20th relocated to Travis Air Force Base, California, where it was assigned to the 60th Operations Group as Travis's 60th Wing prepared to transition from an airlift to an air mobility wing the following year. The inactivation of the 20th Airlift squadron marked the end of the C-141 Starlifter era at Travis. The last Starlifter left Travis on 16 December 1997 and the squadron was inactivated shortly thereafter.

== Lineage ==
- Constituted as the 20th Air Corps Ferrying Squadron on 18 February 1942

Activated on 1 March 1942
Redesignated 20th Transport Squadron on 19 March 1943
Disbanded on 1 September 1943

- Reconstituted as the 20th Air Transport Squadron, Medium on 20 June 1952

Activated on 20 July 1952
Redesignated 20th Air Transport Squadron, Heavy on 18 April 1954
Redesignated 20th Troop Carrier Squadron, Heavy on 1 January 1965
Redesignated 20th Air Transport Squadron, Heavy on 1 July 1965
Redesignated 20th Military Airlift Squadron on 15 January 1966
Redesignated 20th Airlift Squadron on 1 October 1991
Inactivated on 31 December 1997

=== Assignments ===
- Air Corps Ferrying Command, 1 March 1942
- 23d Army Air Forces Ferrying Wing (later, North Atlantic Wing, Air Transport Command), 19 June 1942
- 1600th Air Transport Group, 20 July 1952
- 1607th Air Transport Group, 15 May 1955
- 1607th Air Transport Wing, 18 January 1963
- 436th Military Airlift Wing, 8 January 1966
- 437th Military Airlift Wing 1 August 1973
- 437th Operations Group 1 October 1991
- 60th Operations Group 1 October 1993 – 31 December 1997

=== Stations ===
- Houlton Army Air Base, Maine, 1 March 1942 – 1 September 1943
- Westover Air Force Base, Massachusetts, 20 July 1952
- Dover Air Force Base, Delaware, 15 May 1955
- Charleston Air Force Base, South Carolina, 1 August 1973
- Travis Air Force Base, California, 1 October 1993 – 31 December 1997

=== Aircraft ===
- Various aircraft being ferried across the North Atlantic, 1942–1943
- Douglas C-54 Skymaster, 1952–1954
- Douglas C-124 Globemaster II, 1954–1965
- Lockheed C-141 Starlifter, 1965–1997

=== Awards and campaigns ===
Award streamer	Award	Dates	Notes
	Air Force Outstanding Unit Award	13 November 1967 – 18 December 1967	20th Military Airlift Squadron
	Air Force Outstanding Unit Award	1 January 1968 – 31 December 1969	20th Military Airlift Squadron
	Air Force Outstanding Unit Award	1 September 1971 – 30 June 1972	20th Military Airlift Squadron
	Air Force Outstanding Unit Award	1 July 1982 – 30 June 1984	20th Military Airlift Squadron
	Air Force Outstanding Unit Award	1 July 1984 – 30 June 1986	20th Military Airlift Squadron
	Air Force Outstanding Unit Award	1 July 1988 – 30 June 1989	20th Military Airlift Squadron
	Air Force Outstanding Unit Award	1 July 1989 – 30 June 1990	20th Military Airlift Squadron
	Air Force Outstanding Unit Award	21 September 1989 –31 October 1989	20th Military Airlift Squadron
	Air Force Outstanding Unit Award	1 November 1993 – 31 July 1995	20th Airlift Squadron
	Air Force Outstanding Unit Award	1 August 1995 – 30 July 1997	20th Airlift Squadron
	Republic of Vietnam Gallantry Cross with Palm	1 April 1966 – 28 January 1973	20th Military Airlift Squadron

Campaign Streamer	Campaign	Dates	Notes
	American Theater without inscription	1 March 1942 – 1 September 1943	20th Ferrying Squadron (later 20th Transport Squadron)
	Just Cause	20 December 1989 – 31 January 1990	20th Military Airlift Squadron, Panama
	Defense of Saudi Arabia	2 August 1990 – 16 January 1991	20th Military Airlift Squadron
	Liberation and Defense of Kuwait	17 January 1991 – 11 April 1991	20th Military Airlift Squadron

== See also ==
- List of United States Air Force airlift squadrons
