= 40th Military Airlift Squadron =

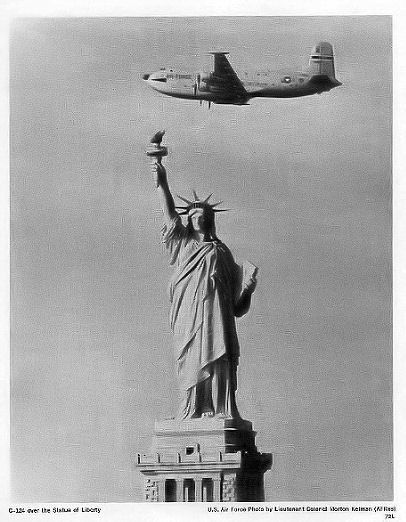
- A C-124 over the Statue of Liberty, about 1960
- Active: 1942–1943; 1954–1960; 1962–1968
- Country: United States
- Branch: United States Air Force
- Role: Airlift
- Mottos: Si Vis Pacem Para Bellum (Latin for 'If You Want Peace, Prepare for War')

Insignia
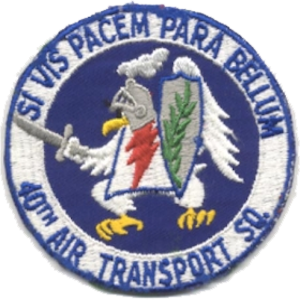
- 40th Air Transport Squadron emblem

The 40th Military Airlift Squadron is an inactive United States Air Force unit. Its last assignment was to the 438th Military Airlift Wing, Military Airlift Command, stationed at McGuire Air Force Base, New Jersey, where it was inactivated on 4 March 1968.

== History ==
The unit was activated as the 40th Ferrying Squadron (later Transport)) Squadron under Air Corps Ferrying Command (later Air Transport Command) at Canton Island Airport, Gilbert Islands, in August 1942. It ferried various aircraft, including A-20s, B-17s, B-24s, B-25s, B-26s, P-38s, P-40s, C-46s, and C-47s, to destinations in the Pacific Theater. The squadron also provided a maintenance service for transient aircraft until it was disbanded on 30 September 1943.

It was reactivated in 1954 under Military Air Transport Service (MATS) at Dover Air Force Base, Delaware in 1954. The squadron flew very long range Douglas C-124 Globemaster II intercontinental transport aircraft carrying passengers and cargo, throughout the MATS Atlantic Division, to Europe, Africa and the Middle East. It was inactivated in 1960.

The squadron was activated again in 1962 at McGuire Air Force Base, New Jersey and equipped with the Boeing C-135 Stratolifter jet transport. It carried cargo between the United States and Vietnam until it was inactivated in 1968 when Military Airlift Command C-135 operations came to an end.

=== Lineage ===
- Constituted as the 40th Ferrying Squadron on 1 August 1942

Activated on 17 August 1942
Redesignated 40th Transport Squadron on 1 March 1943
Disbanded on 30 September 1943
Reconstituted as the 40th Air Transport Squadron, Heavy on 1 March 1954
Activated on 8 March 1954
Inactivated on 8 December 1960
Redesignated 40th Air Transport Squadron, Medium on 8 January 1962
Redesignated 40th Military Airlift Squadron on 8 January 1966
Inactivated on 4 March 1968

=== Assignments ===
- 25th Ferrying Group (later 25th Transport Group), 17 August 1942 – 30 September 1943
- 1607th Air Transport Group, 8 March 1954 – 8 December 1960
- 1611th Air Transport Wing, 8 January 1962 – 8 January 1966
- 438th Military Airlift Wing, 8 January 1966 – 4 March 1968

=== Stations ===
- Canton Island Airport, Gilbert Islands, 17 Aug 1942 – 30 Sep 1943
- Dover Air Force Base, Delaware, 8 March 1954 – 8 December 1960
- McGuire Air Force Base, New Jersey, 8 January 1962 – 4 March 1968

=== Aircraft ===
- Douglas C-124C Globemaster II, 1954–1960
- Lockheed C-130E Hercules, 1962–1968
