= 9th Airlift Squadron =

9th Airlift Squadron

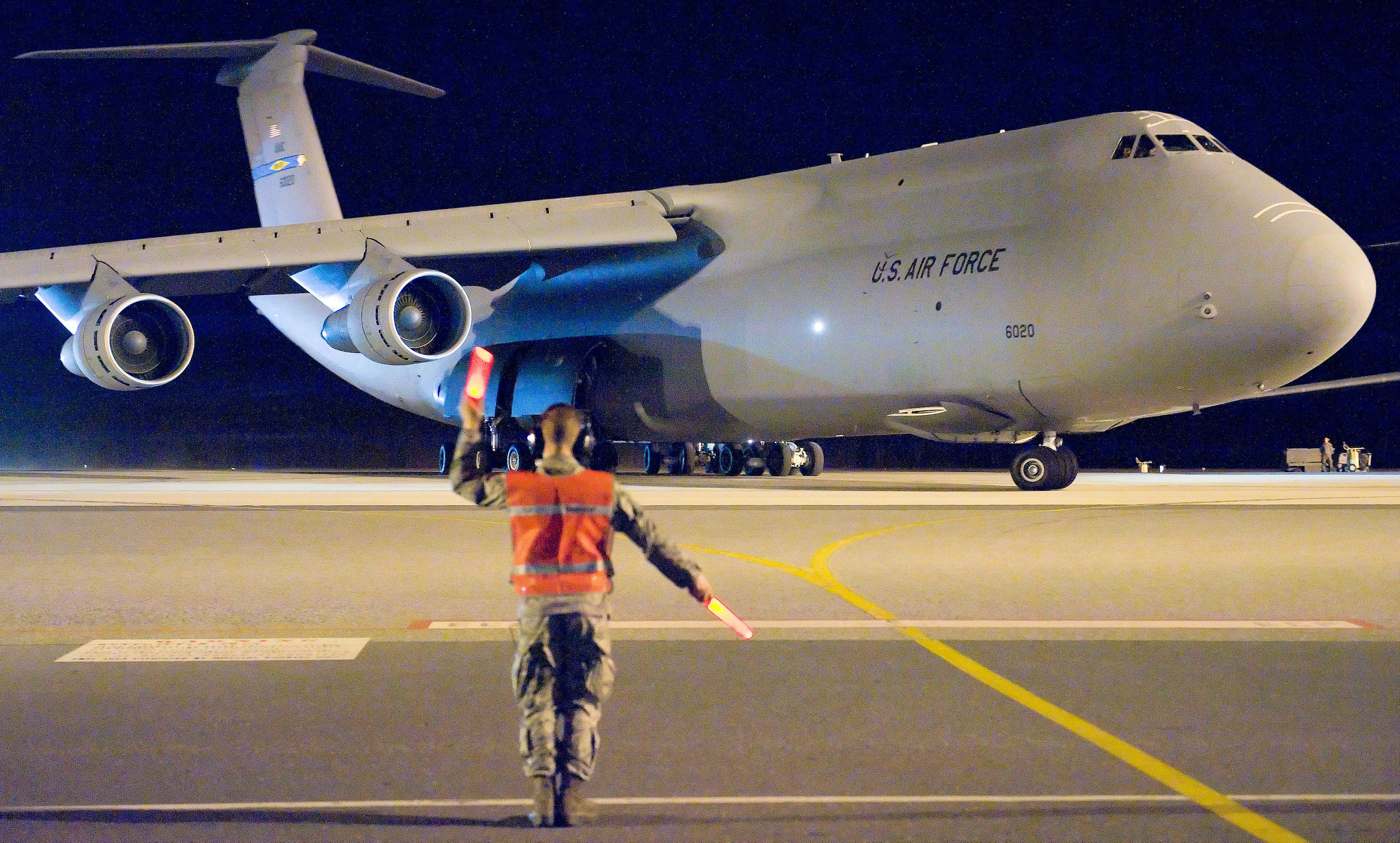
- A 9th Airlift Squadron C-5B is marshalled out of its parking spot for a mission 8 March 2012 (Note: Aircraft is Lockheed C-5B, serial 86-20. This was the last active-duty C-5B mission flown at Dover AFB.)
- Active: 1940–1946; 1949–1951; 1953–1963; 1965–1968; 1971–present
- Country: United States
- Branch: United States Air Force
- Role: Airlift
- Part of: Air Mobility Command
- Garrison/HQ: Dover Air Force Base, Delaware
- Nickname: Proud Pelicans
- Engagements: American Theater of Operations; Pacific Theater of Operations
- Decorations: Air Force Outstanding Unit Award; Republic of Vietnam Gallantry Cross with Palm

Insignia
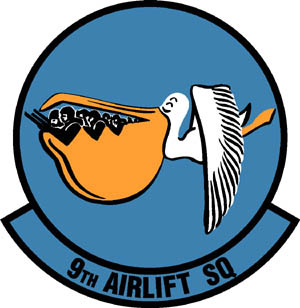
- 9th Airlift Squadron emblem (Note: The emblem was modified between 1963 and 1995 to bring all elements within the disc and comply with Air Force regulations. Compare image and description in Maurer, Combat Squadrons, p. 54 with those in Endicott, pp. 402–403.)

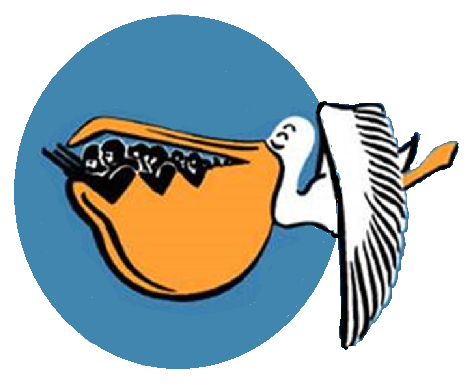
- 9th Troop Carrier Squadron emblem (approved 10 February 1943)

The 9th Airlift Squadron is a unit of the United States Air Force, part of the 436th Airlift Wing Air Mobility Command based at Dover Air Force Base, Delaware. It operates C-5M Galaxy aircraft.

== Mission ==
The 9th Airlift Squadron provides worldwide airlift to meet Department of Defense, Department of State and Presidential mobility requirements.

== History ==
=== World War II ===
Constituted 9th Transport Squadron on 1 January 1938. Activated on 1 December 1940 at Patterson Field, OH with C-34. Moved to Brookley Field, AL, 18 September 1941, then to Camp Williams, WI, 24 May 1942. Redesignated 9th Troop Carrier Squadron on 4 July 1942. Relocated to Dodd Field, TX, c. 18 Sep 1942; Stuttgart, AR, 11 Nov 1942; Victorville, CA, 18 December 1942; Ft Sumner AAFld, NM, 4 Mar 1943; Lawson Field, GA, 7 May 1943; Grenada AAFld, MS, c. 3 Jun 1943-17 Jan 1944; Hickam Field, TH, 21 Feb 1944; Abemama Island, 27 Mar 1944; Saipan, 4 Aug 1944; Guam, Jul-15 Oct 1946.

The squadron provided aerial transportation in Central, Western, and Southwestern Pacific, during World War II. It was inactivated on 15 October 1946.

Redesignated 9th Troop Carrier Squadron, Medium, on 10 May 1949. Activated in the Reserve on 27 Jun 1949 at Floyd Bennett NAS, NY, 27 June 1949 – 9 May 1951. Moved to Altus AFB, OK, 20 June 1953, with C-124. The 9th conducted replacement training through 1943, and subsequently aerial transportation in the Pacific Theater during World War II.

=== Strategic airlift ===
It has provided worldwide airlift since 1953. The 9th resupplied scientific camps in Antarctica from 1959 to 1961, and 1965–1968. It was then relocated to Dover AFB, DE, 1 January 1965, and redesignated 9th Military Airlift Squadron on 8 January 1966. It also flew missions to Southeast Asia from 1965 to 1968 with C-141 Starlifters, but it was then discontinued, and inactivated, on 8 September 1968. It was reactivated on 1 April 1971, with C-5 Galaxys, and participated in the evacuation of refugees from Southeast Asia in April 1975. The squadron supported operations in Grenada, 24 October 1983 – 11 December 1983; Panama, 19 December 1989 – 14 January 1990; and Southwest Asia, August 1990–July 1991. It was then redesignated 9th Airlift Squadron on 1 December 1991.

The last C-5B left the squadron on 12 March 2012. The 9th Airlift Squadron is now a C-5M Super Galaxy exclusive unit.

== Lineage ==
- Constituted as the 9th Transport Squadron on 1 January 1938

Activated on 1 December 1940
Redesignated 9th Troop Carrier Squadron on 4 July 1942
Inactivated on 15 October 1946

- Redesignated 9th Troop Carrier Squadron, Medium on 10 May 1949

Activated in the reserve on 27 June 1949
Ordered to active service on 1 May 1951
Inactivated on 9 May 1951

- Redesignated 9th Troop Carrier Squadron, Heavy on 19 March 1953

Activated on 20 June 1953
Discontinued and inactivated on 18 January 1963

- Activated on 13 November 1964 (not organized)

Organized on 1 January 1965
Redesignated 9th Military Airlift Squadron on 8 January 1966
Discontinued and inactivated on 8 September 1968

- Activated on 1 April 1971

Redesignated 9th Airlift Squadron on 1 December 1991

=== Assignments ===
- 63d Transport Group (later 63d Troop Carrier Group), 1 December 1940
- Seventh Air Force, 3 February 1944
- VI Air Service Area Command, 25 July 1945
- Army Air Forces, Middle Pacific, 15 December 1945
- Pacific Air Command, United States Army, 1 January 1946
- Far East Air Service Command, 9 January 1946
- 54th Troop Carrier Wing, 15 January 1946
- 374th Troop Carrier Group, c. February 1946
- 54th Troop Carrier Wing, 15 May 1946
- 403d Troop Carrier Group, 31 May–15 October 1946
- 63d Troop Carrier Group, 27 June 1949 – 9 May 1951
- 63d Troop Carrier Group, 20 June 1953 – 18 January 1963
- Military Air Transport Service, 13 November 1964 (not organized)
- 1607th Air Transport Wing, 1 January 1965
- 436th Military Airlift Wing, 8 January 1966 – 8 September 1968
- 436th Military Airlift Wing, 1 April 1971
- 436th Operations Group, 1 December 1991 – present

=== Stations ===
- Patterson Field, Ohio, 1 December 1940
- Brookley Field, Alabama, 18 September 1941
- Camp Williams, Wisconsin, 24 May 1942
- Dodd Field, Texas, c. 18 September 1942
- Stuttgart Army Air Field, Arkansas, 11 November 1942
- Victorville Army Air Field, California, 18 December 1942
- Fort Sumner Army Air Field, New Mexico, 4 March 1943
- Lawson Field, Georgia, 7 May 1943
- Grenada Army Air Field, Mississippi, c. 3 June 1943 – 17 January 1944
- Hickam Field, Hawaii, 21 February 1944
- Abemama Island, 27 March 1944
- East Field (Saipan), Mariana Islands, 4 August 1944
- Agana Airfield, Guam, Marianas Islands, July–15 October 1946
- Floyd Bennett Naval Air Station, New York, 27 June 1949 – 9 May 1951
- Altus Air Force Base, Oklahoma, 20 June 1953
- Donaldson Air Force Base, South Carolina, 15 October 1953 – 18 January 1963
- Dover Air Force Base, Delaware, 1 January 1965 – 8 September 1968
- Dover Air Force Base, Delaware, 1 April 1971 – present

=== Aircraft ===
- Douglas C-33 (1940–1941)
- Douglas C-34 (1940–1941)
- Douglas C-39 (1940–1941)
- Douglas C-47 Skytrain (1942–1946, 1949–1951)
- Douglas C-50 (1942)
- Douglas C-53 Skytrooper (1942–1943)
- Curtiss C-46 Commando (1945–1946)
- Douglas C-54 Skymaster (1946)
- Douglas C-124 Globemaster II (1953–1963, 1965–1966)
- Lockheed C-141 Starlifter (1966–1968)
- Lockheed C-5A Galaxy (1971–unknown)
- Lockheed C-5B Galaxy (unknown–2012)
- Lockheed C-5M Super Galaxy (2009–present)

=== Operations ===
- Operation Neptune
- Operation Deep Freeze
- Operation Urgent Fury
- Operation Just Cause
- Operation Desert Storm
- Operation Iraqi Freedom/Operation New Dawn
- Operation Enduring Freedom
