= 328th Air Refueling Squadron =

US Air Force reserve unit

328th Air Refueling Squadron

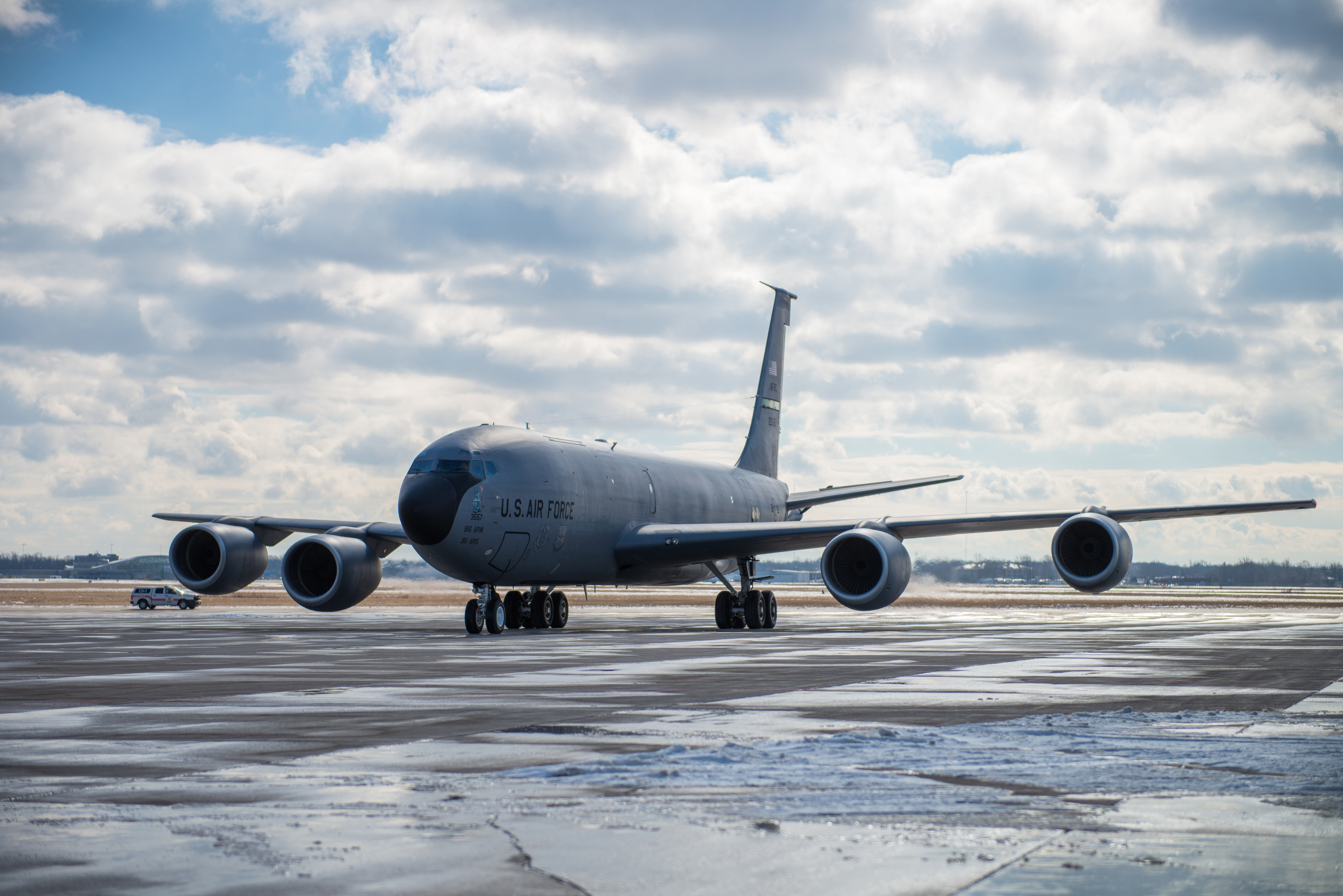
- A KC-135 Stratotanker arrives at Niagara Falls Air Reserve Station
- Active: 1944–1945; 1949–1951; 1952–present
- Country: United States
- Branch: United States Air Force
- Role: Aerial refueling
- Part of: Air Force Reserve Command
- Garrison/HQ: Niagara Falls International Airport
- Motto: Tenete eos in tenebris (Keep them in the dark)
- Engagements: China-Burma-India Theater
- Decorations: Air Force Outstanding Unit Award; Republic of Vietnam Gallantry Cross with Palm

Insignia
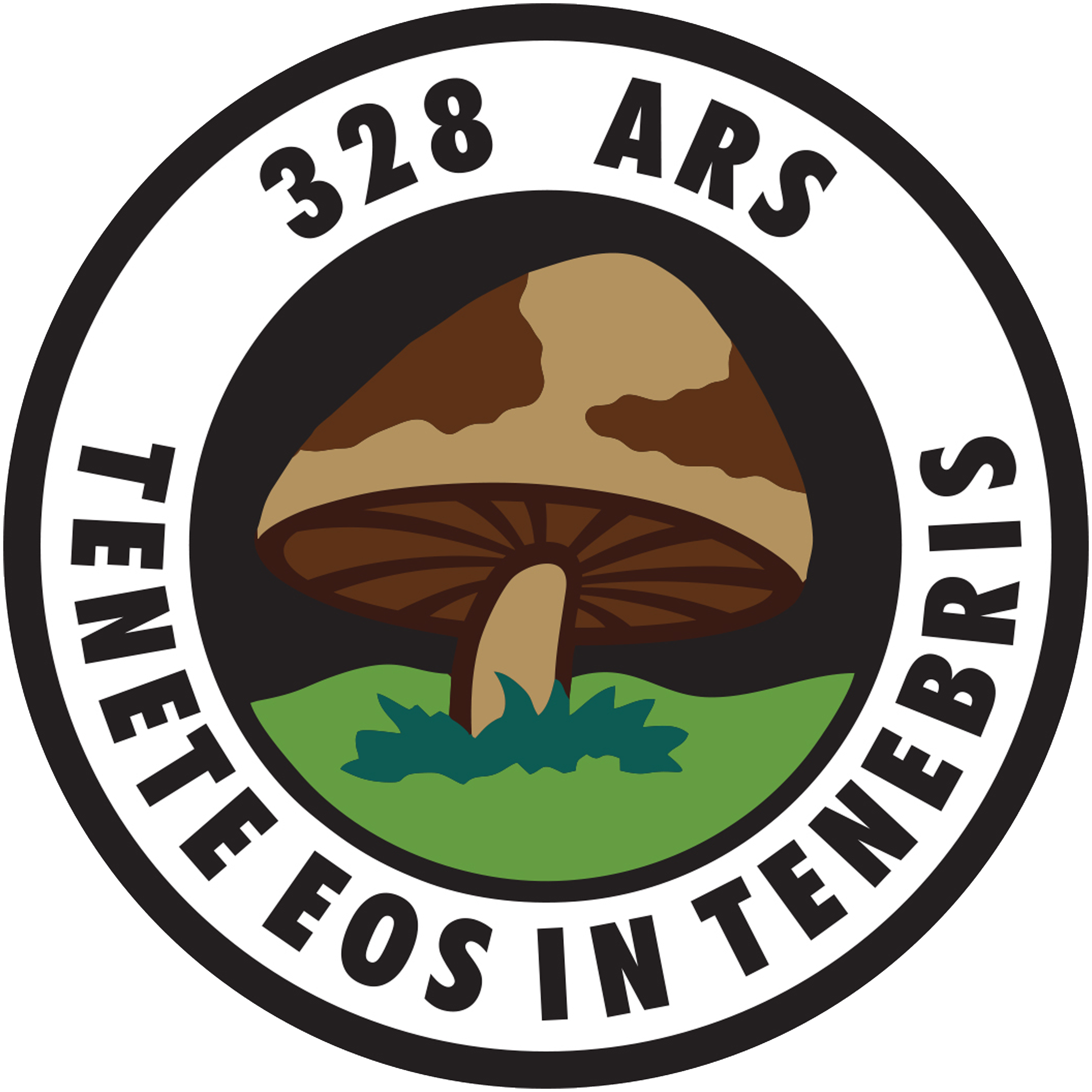
- 328th Air Refueling Squadron emblem

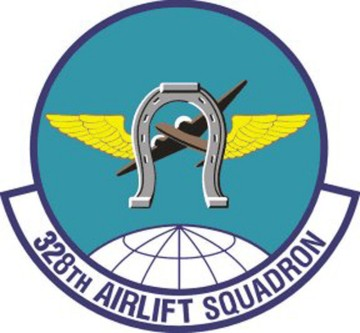
- 328th Airlift Squadron emblem (approved 23 September 1998)

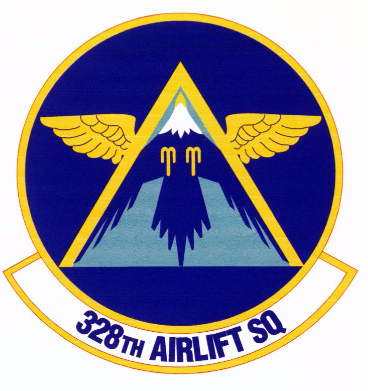
- 328th Airlift Squadron emblem (1996) (approved 28 July 1944, modified 1996)

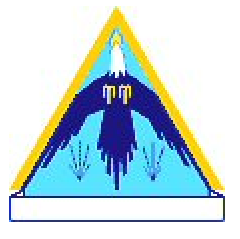
- 328th Troop Carrier Squadron emblem

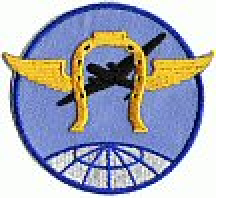
- 3d Combat Cargo Squadron emblem (Note: Maurer says that the emblem used by the 328th Troop Carrier Squadron was the one approved in 1944 for the 3d Combat Cargo Squadron. Maurer, Combat Squadrons, p. 20. The 2007 AFHRA Factsheet says the current emblem is a modification of the 1944 emblem. Whether approved or not, it appears that the 3d Combat Cargo Squadron used a variation of the Horseshoe Emblem in the CBI Theater. Each was used by the 328th Airlift Squadron, modified to comply with regulations current at the time, the emblem of the 328th Troop Carrier Squadron was placed on a disc in 1996, and when the Horseshoe Emblem was restored in 1998, it was revised so that the wings were within the disc.)

The 328th Air Refueling Squadron is an Air Force Reserve Command unit of the 914th Air Refueling Wing at Niagara Falls International Airport, Niagara, New York. It operates KC-135R Stratotanker aircraft refueling United States Air Force aircraft worldwide.

== History ==
=== World War II ===
Constituted as 3 Combat Cargo Squadron on 11 April 1944. Activated on 15 April 1944 at Bowman Field, KY with C-47 transports. The 328th transported personnel and supplies, primarily to forward areas, and evacuated casualties in the China-Burma-India Theater from 16 September 1944 to 11 November 1945. Redesignated as 328 Troop Carrier Squadron on 29 Sep 1945. Inactivated on 20 Dec 1945. Redesignated as 328 Troop Carrier Squadron, Medium on 4 August 1949. Activated in the Reserve on 2 September 1949, with C-46 aircraft at Reading Municipal Airport, PA.

Ordered to Active Service on 15 March 1951, at New Castle County Airport, DE, 1 May 1950 – 1 April 1951 . Inactivated on 1 April 1951. Activated in the Reserve on 14 June 1952, at New Castle County Aprt, DE. Move to Paine AFB on 16 Nov 1957, WA. Ordered to Active Service on 28 Oct 1962. Relieved from Active Duty on 28 Nov 1962. Redesignated as: 328 Tactical Airlift Squadron on 1 July 1967; convert to [C- 130 aircraft in 1971.

Redesignated 328 Airlift Squadron on 1 February 1992; 328 Air Refueling Squadron on 1 June 2017. Niagara Falls Municipal Airport (later, Niagara Falls Intl Airport; Niagara Falls IAP-ARS), NY, 25 March 1958-. Currently operating KC-135R tanker aircraft.

=== Operations ===
- World War II
- Vietnam War
- Operation Desert Storm
- Operation Provide Promise
- Operation Allied Force
- Operation Joint Guard
- Operation Enduring Freedom
- Operation Iraqi Freedom

== Lineage ==
- Constituted as the 3d Combat Cargo Squadron on 11 April 1944

Activated on 15 April 1944
Redesignated 328th Troop Carrier Squadron on 29 September 1945
Inactivated on 20 December 1945

- Redesignated 328th Troop Carrier Squadron, Medium on 4 August 1949

Activated in the reserve on 2 September 1949
Ordered to active service on 15 March 1951
Inactivated on 1 April 1951

- Activated in the reserve on 14 June 1952

Ordered to active service on 28 October 1962
Relieved from active service on 28 November 1962
Redesignated 328th Tactical Airlift Squadron on 1 July 1967
Redesignated 328th Airlift Squadron on 1 February 1992
Redesignated 328th Air Refueling Squadron on 1 June 2017

=== Assignments ===
- 1st Combat Cargo Group (later 512th Troop Carrier Group), 15 April 1944 – 26 December 1945 (attached to India-China Division, Air Transport Command, 23 June – 20 August 1945; 69th Composite Wing, 25 August – 10 November 1945)
- 512th Troop Carrier Group, 2 September 1949 – 1 April 1951
- 512th Troop Carrier Group, 14 June 1952
- 349th Troop Carrier Group, 16 November 1957
- 512th Troop Carrier Group, 15 March 1957
- 512th Troop Carrier Wing, 14 April 1959
- 914th Troop Carrier Group (later 914th Tactical Airlift Group, 914th Airlift Group), 11 February 1963
- 914th Operations Group, 1 August 1992 – present

=== Stations ===
- Bowman Field, Kentucky, 15 April 1944
- Baer Field, Indiana, 5–11 August 1944
- Sylhet Airport, India (now Bangla Desh), 30 August 1944 (detachment operated from Yunnani, China, 16 September-2 October 1944)
- Tulihal Airport, India, 18 October 1944
- Hathazari Airfield, India (now Bangla Desh), 7 April 1945
- Myitkyina Airport, Burma, 1 June 1945
- Luliang Air Base, China, 25 August 1945
- Kunming Airport, 4 September 1945
- Kharagpur Airfield, India, 15 November – 20 December 1945
- Reading Municipal Airport, Pennsylvania, 2 September 1949
- New Castle County Airport, Delaware, 1 May 1950 – 1 April 1951
- New Castle County Airport, Delaware, 14 June 1952
- Paine Air Force Base, Washington, 16 November 1957
- Niagara Falls Municipal Airport (later Niagara Falls International Airport, Niagara Falls Air Reserve Station), New York, 25 March 1958 – present

=== Aircraft ===
- Douglas C-47 Skytrain (1944–1945)
- Curtiss C-46 Commando (1949–1951, 1952–1958)
- Fairchild C-119 Flying Boxcar (1957–1971)
- Lockheed C-130 Hercules (1971–2017)
- Boeing KC-135 (2017-present)
