= 327th =

327th may refer to:

- 327th Air Division, inactive air division of the United States Air Force
- 327th Aircraft Sustainment Wing, inactive wing of the United States Air Force last based at Tinker Air Force Base, Oklahoma
- 327th Squadron (disambiguation), several aviation units
- 327th Infantry Regiment (United States) ("Bastogne Bulldogs"), a glider-borne regiment of the U.S. 101st Airborne Division
- 327th Signal Battalion (United States) (Airborne) provided worldwide rapidly deployable signal support for the Joint Task Force Headquarters
- 327th Tank Battalion (United States), the mechanized unit that engaged in tank warfare in World War I for the United States

== See also ==
- 327 (number)
- 327, the year 327 (CCCXXVII) of the Julian calendar
- 327 BC
