= Dohazari Airfield =

Airfield in Bangladesh

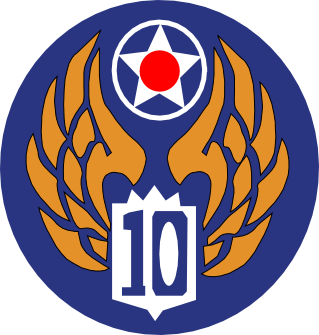
Dohazari Airfield
- Part of Royal Air Force and Tenth Air Force
- Dohazari, Bangladesh

Site information
- Type: Military airfield
- Controlled by: Royal Air Force; United States Army Air Forces

Location
- Location within Bangladesh
- Coordinates: 22°09′55.21″N 092°04′06.51″E (Approximate)

Site history
- Built: 1944
- In use: 1944–1945
- Battles/wars: Burma Campaign 1944–1945

Dohazari Airfield is a former WW2 Allied military airfield near Dohazari in Bangladesh used during the Burma Campaign 1944–1945 of World War II, first by Royal Air Force units and later by the United States Army Air Forces' 1st Combat Cargo Group.

== Location and wartime role ==
Dohazari lay on the southern supply route from Chittagong towards the Arakan front, where rail and road communications served Allied operations in Burma. As such, the airfield was also part of the wider Chittagong–Arakan logistics system that moved supplies, personnel, and equipment towards the front. This airfield made a key contribution to the China India Burma theater (CIB).

== Construction and Engineering ==
The most remarkable aspect of the Dohazari airfield was its construction. It was normal for airfields in East Bengal and Arakan to become muddy and impassable during the monsoons. But at Dohazari, the Indian Army Engineers (under the Engineer-in-Chief, India) built a runway that was capable of operating all year round. First, the foundation was prepared with silt and clay. On top of this, “prefabricated bituminous surfacing” or PBS, which was a waterproof layer like thick hessian cloth, was laid. But if steel planking (pierced steel planking or PSP) was laid directly on it, the plates would move under the pressure of the heavy aircraft and the waterproof layer would be torn. At Dohazari, engineers first laid a 1.5 inch thick bituminous sand carpet over the PBS, then laid the PSP on top of that sand layer. This innovative method made Dohazari's runway much more durable than those at Agartala or Feni in the same region; heavy bombers could land even in the rain. Initially, in 1943, it was a raw dirt strip for the RAF, but by 1944, with the application of all these advanced technologies, the base had become a full-fledged all-weather base.

== Layout and facilities ==
Wartime USAAF records describe Dohazari's main wartime runway as a sod strip measuring 5,500 ft (1,676 m) in length and 150 ft (46 m) in width. The April 1945 unit history of the 4th Combat Cargo Squadron notes that intensive operations left the sod surface badly degraded by dust during the dry season, and that British engineers attempted to control this using a "bucket brigade" of Indian laborers to water the strip.

Accommodation and domestic facilities on the American side were basic. The same history records that "quarters for the officers and enlisted men alike were the usual, one room bamboo basha", and that frequent tropical storms destroyed many of these huts, temporarily leaving around fifty officers and enlisted men homeless and without clothing. Squadron personnel relied on simple amenities such as a camp cinema, small library and club for recreation, with the food situation gradually improving as additional mess equipment arrived.

== Use by the RAF ==
Supermarine Spitfire at Dohazari

Several RAF squadrons used the Dohazari between 1943 and 1944. The fighters and bombers operated in air defense and offensive operations over Burma. From airfields in East Bengal, they assisted in operations against Japanese positions and communications in Burma.

RAF Orders of Battle indicate that Dohazari also hosted specialist support units responsible for ground servicing and air defense. In May and June 1943, alongside No. 60 Squadron RAF and its Bristol Blenheim IV bombers, the airfield housed No. 6 Refuelling and Rearming Party at Dohazari, providing forward fuel and ordnance handling for flying units. Later, No. 85 Refuelling and Rearming Party under No. 224 Group was listed at Dohazari, reflecting its continued role as a forward operating base in the Chittagong–Arakan sector, while RAF Regiment squadrons provided local ground and anti‑aircraft defense.

| Insignia | Squadron | Assigned aircraft | Deployment period |
|---|---|---|---|
| | No. 60 Squadron RAF | Bristol Blenheim IV | January – May 1943 |
| | No. 79 Squadron RAF | Hawker Hurricane IIC | January 1943 and January 1944 |
| | No. 110 Squadron RAF | Vultee Vengeance I, IA and II | 17-24 March 1943 |
| | No. 135 Squadron RAF | Hawker Hurricane IIB | May 1943 |
| | No. 258 Squadron RAF | Hawker Hurricane IIC | November – December 1943 |
| | No. 82 Squadron RAF | Vengeance I, II and III | 21 November 1943 – 22 January 1944 |
| | No. 615 Squadron RAF | Supermarine Spitfire VC | 13 December 1943 – 25 February 1944 |
| | No. 27 Squadron RAF | Bristol Beaufighter X | 5-19 November 1944 |
| | No. 6 Refuelling and Rearming Party | | January – June 1943 |
| | No. 4352 Anti-Aircraft Flight RAF Regiment | | June 1943 – June 1944 |
| | No. 4404 Anti-Aircraft Flight RAF Regiment | | June 1943 – June 1944 |
| | No. 4442 Anti-Aircraft Flight RAF Regiment | | September 1943 – May 1944 |
| | 1583 (Calibration) Flight | | September 1943 – January 1946 |
| | 79 Embarkation Unit | | 22 October 1943 – 9 April 1944 |
| | 6 Transit Camp | | October 1943 – April 1945 |
| | 17 Static Administration Unit (SAU) | | January – July 1944 |
| | No. 85 Refuelling and Rearming Party | | April 1944 – 1945 |
| | No. 3 Bomb Disposal Squad RAF | | April 1944 – 1945 |
| | No. 2706 Squadron RAF Regiment (LAA Squadron) | | August 1944 – 21 December 1944 |
| | No. 2967 Squadron RAF Regiment (Field Squadron) | | July – December 1944 |
| | No. 2966 Squadron RAF Regiment (Field Squadron) | | October – December 1944 |
| | 2706 Defence (D) Squadron RAF Regiment | | 1 December – 12 December 1944 |

== Use by the USAAF ==
The 1st Combat Cargo Group moved to Dohazari on 30 January 1945. The group had been established in April 1944 for combat cargo operations and later became the 512th Troop Carrier Group. From bases in the China Burma India theater (CBI), it transported troops and supplies, moved equipment for the construction and operation of airstrips, evacuated casualties and liberated prisoners of war, towed gliders, and dropped paratroops and cargo in support of Allied operations in Burma.

| Insignia | Squadron | Assigned aircraft | Deployment period |
|---|---|---|---|
| | 1st Combat Cargo Group | Douglas C-47 Skytrain in 1944 Curtiss C-46 Commando in 1945 | 1944 – 1945 |
| | 2nd Combat Cargo Squadron | Douglas C-47 Skytrain | 1 February 1945 – 15 May 1945 |
| | 4th Combat Cargo Squadron | Curtiss C-46 Commando | 1 February 1945 – 15 May 1945 |
| | 345th Airdrome Squadron | | 30 January 1945 – May 1945 |
| | 347th Airdrome Squadron | | 1 February 1945 – 15 May 1945 |

After the war, the airfield was abandoned and today is part of an agricultural area.

== See also ==
- List of airports in Bangladesh
