= Aviana Airways =

Aviana Airways may refer to:

- Royal Bengal Airlines, the trading name for Aviana Airways Ltd (Bangladesh)
- Inter Island Airways, a subsidiary of Nevada-based Aviana Airways
