= No. 135 Squadron RAF =

Defunct flying squadron of the Royal Air Force

- Squadron badge of No. 135 Squadron
- Active: 1 April 1918 – 4 July 1918; 15 August 1941 – 10 June 1945
- Country: United Kingdom
- Branch: Royal Air Force
- Mottos: Latin: Pennas ubique monstramus ("We show our wings everywhere")

Insignia
- Squadron Badge: A peacock.
- Squadron Codes: WK (Aug 1941 - June 1945)

No. 135 Squadron RAF was a Royal Air Force Squadron formed to be a bomber unit in the First World War and reformed as a fighter unit in the Second World War.

== Formation and First World War ==
No. 135 Squadron Royal Flying Corps was formed on 1 March 1918 at RAF Hucknall, Nottinghamshire, as a training squadron. It was intended to be equipped with the De Havilland DH.9 from September 1918 and to move to France in October 1918, but in a re-organisation of squadrons after the Royal Air Force was formed, the squadron disbanded on 4 July 1918 without becoming operational.

== Reformation in the Second World War ==
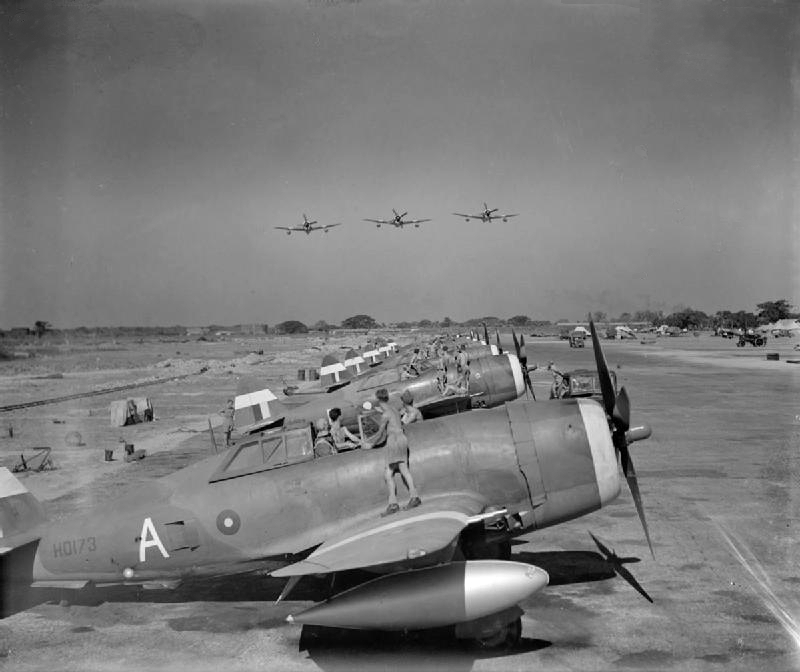
135 Sqn Thunderbolt Is at Chittagong, circa 1944

The squadron reformed on 15 August 1941 as a fighter unit equipped with the Hawker Hurricane IIA at RAF Baginton, but moved to RAF Honiley on 4 September. It became operational for a month on 3 October, but was then moved to Calcutta, India, embarking for there on 10 November. Due to the outbreak of the Pacific War the squadron was diverted to Rangoon, Burma, where it began operations against Japanese air attacks on 26 January 1942, having replaced its IIAs with Hurricane IIBs. It was based at Zayatkwin from 16 January and then Mingaladon from 28 January. The aircraft were almost entirely lost in the fighting, and to avoid being overrun by the Japanese advance the ground crew were evacuated to Calcutta, embarking on 20 February. The squadron was reformed there at Dum Dum from 27 March and began flying convoy patrols, moving to air defence duties and sweeps over Burma in January 1943. For the latter, it operated from fields code named George/Hove from 23 January, Ramu/Reindeer from 13 May, and Dohazari from 16 May.

Withdrawn to St. Thomas Mount in southern India on 22 May, No. 135 Squadron became a conversion unit for Bristol Blenheim squadrons being re-equipped with Hurricanes and provided air defence for the area, receiving the Hurricane IIC in October. Relocated to Yelahanka on 1 July it returned to St. Thomas Mount on 22 November, then moved to Minneriya on 16 January 1944. It was re-equipped with the Republic Thunderbolt I in May and completed conversion by the end of August, resuming ground attack missions over Burma on 16 October. The squadron temporarily relocated to Amarda Road between 25 August and 16 September, then moved to Chittagong on 9 October, Jumchar on 9 December, and Cox's Bazar on 15 April. The squadron was only briefly at Cox's Bazar before it moved forward to Akyab on 24 April. The squadron continued the ground attack missions until May 1945, when it was withdrawn from combat before being renumbered to 615 Squadron on 10 June 1945. Its final station was Chakulia from 17 May.

== Aircraft operated ==
Aircraft operated by No. 135 Squadron RAF
From	To	Aircraft	Variant
Aug 1941	Nov 1941	Hawker Hurricane	IIA
Nov 1941	Nov 1941	Hawker Hurricane	IIC
Feb 1942	Oct 1943	Hawker Hurricane	IIB
Oct 1943	Sep 1944	Hawker Hurricane	IIC
May 1944	Jun 1945	Republic Thunderbolt	I
