= 327th Airlift Squadron =

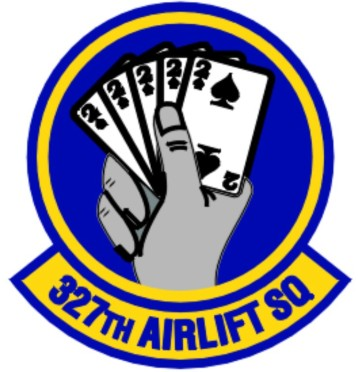
- 327th Airlift Squadron patch
- Active: 11 April 1944 – 26 December 1945; 29 May 1947 – 1 April 1951; 14 June 1952 – 30 September 2007; 13 July 2014
- Country: United States
- Branch: United States Air Force
- Type: Airlift
- Part of: Air Force Reserve Command; 22nd Air Force; 913th Airlift Group
- Garrison/HQ: Little Rock Air Force Base
- Decorations: Air Force Outstanding Unit Award; Republic of Vietnam Gallantry Cross with Palm

Aircraft flown
- Transport: C-130J Super Hercules

The 327th Airlift Squadron (327 AS) is a United States Air Force Reserve squadron, assigned to the 913th Airlift Group at Little Rock Air Force Base, Arkansas. It operates C-130J aircraft supporting the United States Air Force global reach mission worldwide.

== History ==
=== Origins ===
Constituted 2nd Combat Cargo Squadron on 11 Apr 1944. Activated on 15 Apr 1944. The 327th conducted aerial transportation in the China – Burma – India theater from, 28 August 1944 – c. 20 October 1945. Redesignated 327th Troop Carrier Squadron on 31 Oct 1945. Inactivated on 26 Dec 1945. Activated an air force reserve unit on 29 May 1947. Ordered to active service on 28 Oct 1962 until 28 Nov 1962.

It performed troop carrier training from, 1947 – 1951. It has supported airborne forces and performed worldwide airlift since 1952. Redesignated the 327th Tactical Airlift Squadron on 1 Jul 1967.

The squadron deployed to Southwest Asia and performed airlift missions in support of the Gulf War, January – April 1991. Redesignated the 327th Airlift Squadron on 1 Feb 1992. The squadron deployed again in support of Operations Enduring Freedom and Iraqi Freedom in 2003 and 2005–2006. It was inactivated on 30 September 2007.

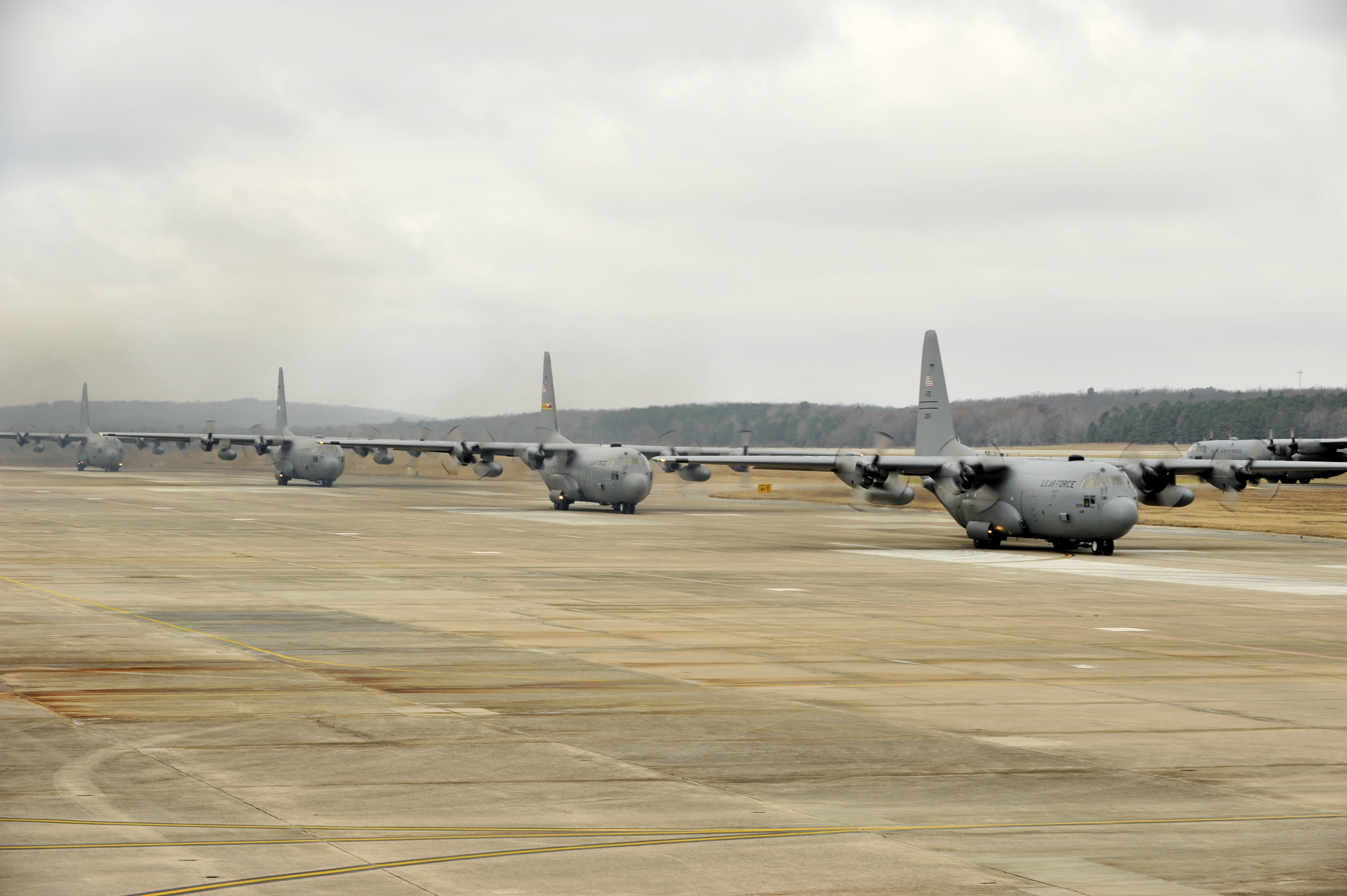
327th Airlift Squadron C-130H Hercules' (December 2014)

=== Modern era ===
The 327th was reactivated at Little Rock Air Force Base, Arkansas on 13 July 2014, operating C-130H2 Hercules aircraft. In 2016, the squadron converted to a classic associate unit, operating the C-130J Super Hercules, and associated with the active duty 19th Airlift Wing.

The 327th Airlift Squadron was declared fully operational capable on 2 December 2017 with the C-130J Super Hercules.

== Lineage ==
- Constituted 2d Combat Cargo Squadron on 11 April 1944

Activated on 15 April 1944
Redesignated 327th Troop Carrier Squadron on 31 October 1945
Inactivated on 26 December 1945

- Activated in the reserve on 29 May 1947

Redesignated 327th Troop Carrier Squadron, Medium on 2 September 1949
Ordered to Active Service on 15 March 1951
Inactivated on 1 April 1951

- Activated in the reserve on 14 June 1952

Ordered to Active Service on 28 October 1962
Relieved from Active Duty on 28 November 1962
Redesignated: 327th Tactical Airlift Squadron on 1 July 1967
Redesignated: 327th Airlift Squadron on 1 February 1992
Inactivated on 30 September 2007

- Activated on 13 July 2014

=== Assignments ===
- 1st Combat Cargo Group, 15 April 1944

Under operational control of Air Transport Command, 1 July – 9 September 1945

- Fourteenth Air Force, 10 September – 26 December 1945
- 514th Troop Carrier Group, 29 May 1947
- 512th Troop Carrier Group, 2 September 1949 – 1 April 1951
- 512th Troop Carrier Group, 14 June 1952; 14 April 1959
- 913th Troop Carrier (later, 913th Tactical Airlift; 913th Airlift) Group, 11 February 1963
- 913th Operations Group, 1 August 1992 – 30 September 2007
- 913th Airlift Group, 13 July 2014

=== Stations ===
- Bowman Field, Kentucky, 15 April – 3 August 1944
- Sylet Airfield, India, 27 August 1944

Detachment operated from Yunnani Airfield, China, 11 – 18 September 1944

- Tulihal Airfield, India, 22 November 1944
- Tsuyung Airfield, China, 12 December 1944
- Dohazari Airfield, India, 1 February 1945
- Hathazari Airfield, India, 16 May 1945
- Bhamo Airfield, Burma, 1 June 1945
- Peishiyi Airfield, China, 10 September – 26 December 1945
- Marietta Army Airfield, Georgia, 29 May 1947
- Reading Municipal Airport, Pennsylvania, 2 September 1949
- New Castle County Airport, Delaware, 1 May 1950 – 1 April 1951; 14 June 1952
- Willow Grove Air Reserve Facility (later, Station), Pennsylvania, 20 July 1958 – 30 September 2007
- Little Rock Air Force Base, Arkansas, 13 July 2014

=== Aircraft operated ===
- C-47 Skytrain (1944–1945)
- C-46 Commando (1949–1951, 1952–1957)
- AT-7 Navigator (1949–1951)
- AT-11 Kansan (1949–1951)
- C-119 Flying Boxcar (1957–1969, 1970–1971)
- C-130E Hercules (1970–2007)
- C-130H Hercules (2014–2016)
- C-130J Hercules (2016–Present)

== Patch (Aircraft Marking for the 2d Combat Cargo Squadron) ==
AIRCRAFT MARKING: On a medium blue disc, border yellow, a dexter hand holding five playing cards spread fanwise, all deuces of Spades, proper, as per record drawing. SIGNIFICANCE: The five deuces represent winners, while the "2's" indicate the Squadron's numerical design. The five cards symbolize the five flights of the squadron. Approved 17 July 1944 by Robert C. Jones, Colonel, Air Corps, Chief, Special Services Division, Office, Asst. Chief of Air Staff, Personnel.

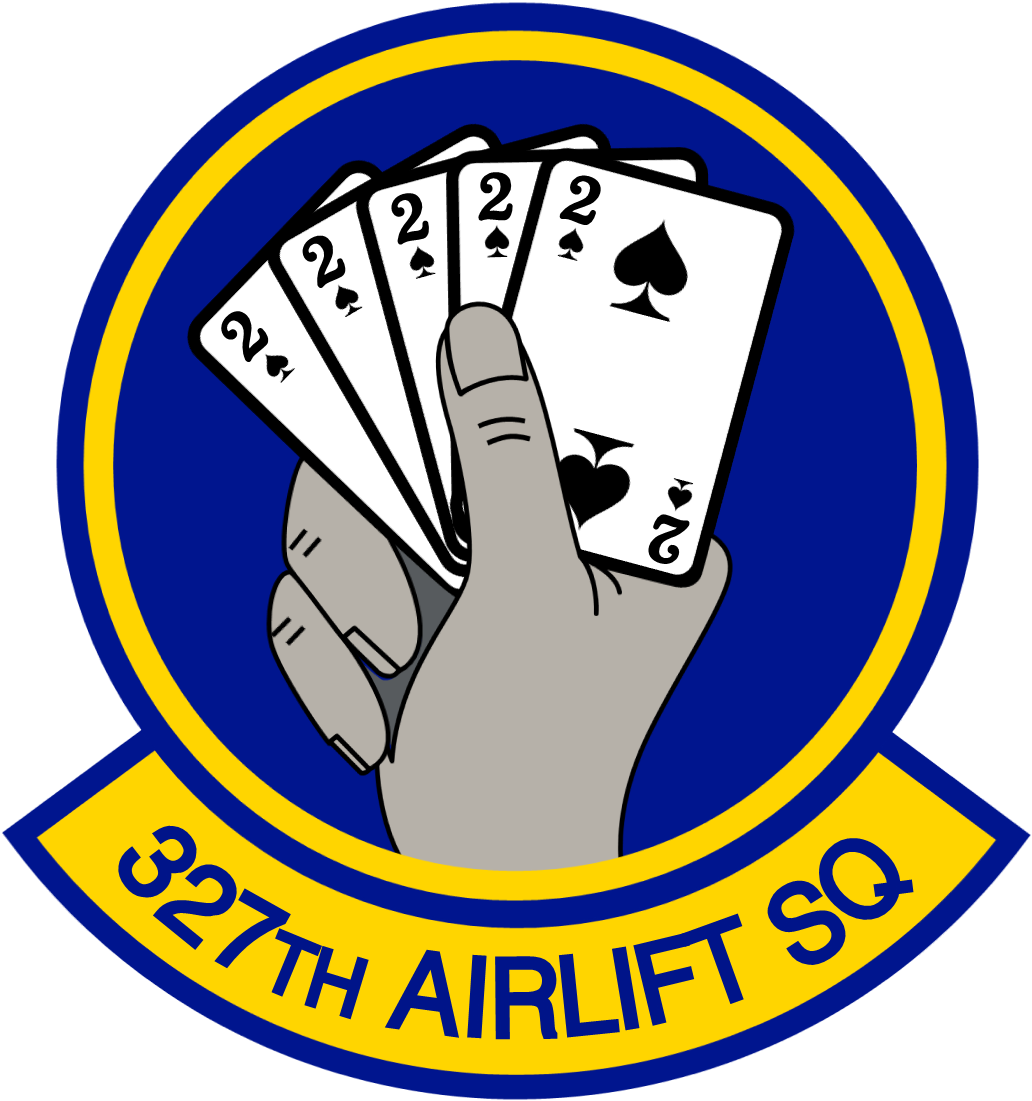
327AS PNG
