= 512th Operations Group =

512th Operations Group

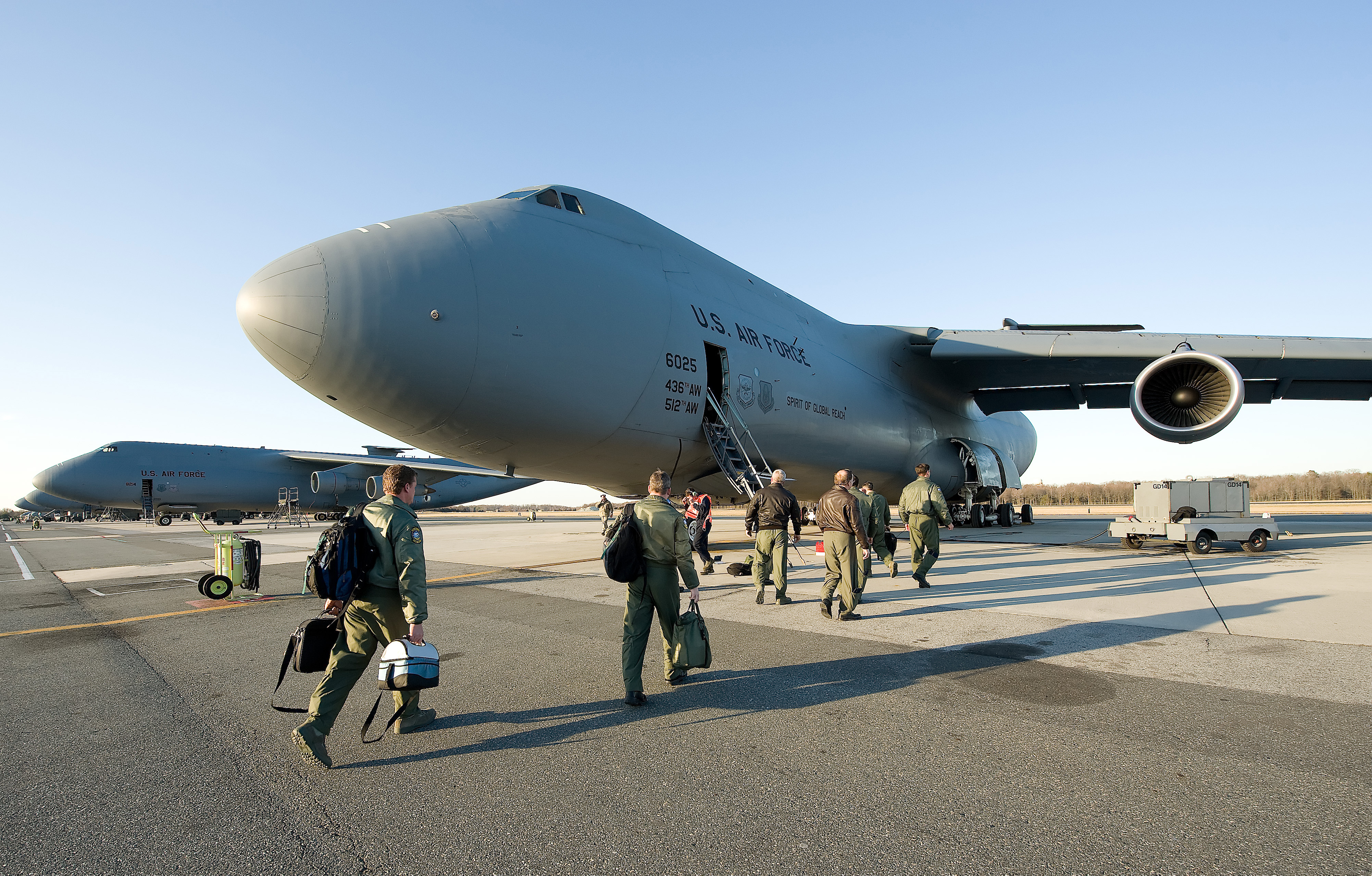
- A 709th Airlift Squadron crew boards the wing's first C-5M Super Galaxy (Note: The aircraft is Lockheed C-5M Galaxy serial 86-25, "The Spirit of Global Reach" The aircraft arrived at Dover Air Force Base on 9 February 2009 and the crew is pictured making its local training mission on 17 February 2009. This plane is the first of three C-5M Super Galaxies the base will receive for operational testing and evaluation.)
- Active: 1944–1945; 1949–1951; 1952–1959; 1993–present
- Country: United States
- Branch: United States Air Force
- Role: Airlift
- Part of: Air Force Reserve Command
- Garrison/HQ: Dover Air Force Base
- Engagements: China-Burma-India Theater
- Decorations: Air Force Outstanding Unit Award

Insignia
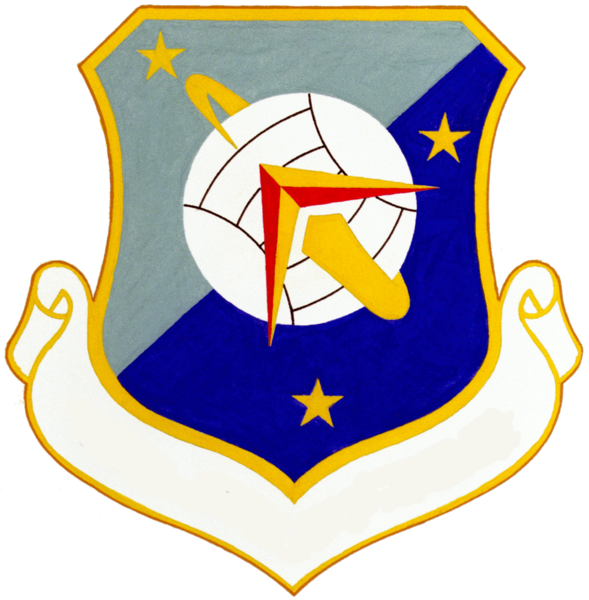
- 512th Operations Group emblem (approved 21 December 1993) (Note: The group uses the wing emblem with the group designation on the scroll)

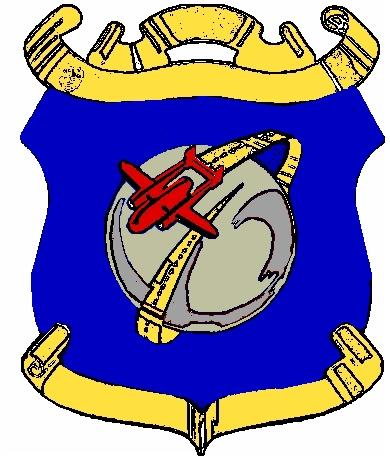
- 512th Troop Carrier Group emblem (Approved 21 January 1958)

The 512th Operations Group is the operational flying component of the 512th Airlift Wing, assigned to the United States Air Force Reserve. The group is stationed at Dover Air Force Base, Delaware.

During World War II as the 1st Combat Cargo Group, the group fought in the China-Burma-India Theater transporting supplies and reinforcements to and evacuating casualties flying combat operations in Burma and China assigned to the Tenth Air Force. After the war, the unit was redesignated as the 512th Troop Carrier Group (Medium) and allotted to the reserve.

== Overview ==
The unit is the operational component of the 512th Airlift Wing, and consists of 2 airlift squadrons and 2 support squadrons. Members of the group work side-by-side with their active duty counterparts in the 436th Airlift Wing. The unit flies the C-5M Super Galaxy and the C-17A Globemaster III

- 709th Airlift Squadron C-5 Galaxy
- 326th Airlift Squadron C-17 Globemaster III
- 512th Operations Support Squadron
- 512th Airlift Control Flight

== History ==
For additional history and lineage, see 512th Airlift Wing

Trained in the United States for combat cargo operations between Apr and August 1944. Moved to the CBI theater in August 1944. Began operations in September 1944 by transporting supplies and reinforcements to and evacuating casualties from Imphal, Burma.

Continued to support Allied operations in Burma, flying in men and supplies from India, moving equipment required to construct and operate airstrips, dropping dummy cargoes to lead the enemy away from Allied offensives, dropping paratroops for the assault on Rangoon (May 1945), and evacuating prisoners of war who were freed by Allied advances.

Meanwhile, part of the group had been sent to China, and for a short time (December 1944 – January 1945) the group's headquarters was located there. Operations in China included helping to evacuate the air base at Guilin during a Japanese drive in September 1944, moving Chinese troops, and flying many supply missions, some of which involved ferrying gasoline and materiel over The Hump from India.

The group, partially re-equipped with C-46 Commandos in June 1945, engaged primarily in transporting men, food, arms, and ammunition until the end of the war. Redesignated 512th Troop Carrier Group in September 1945. Returned to the US in December 1945. Inactivated on 24 December 1945.

Activated on 2 September 1949. Equipped with C-46's. Between September 1949 and March 1951, and again from June 1952 – April 1959, trained as a Reserve troop carrier group at bases in Pennsylvania and Delaware. Activated as a result of the Korean War in 1951, personnel and equipment reassigned to active duty units in Far East Air Force to support combat operations. Unit inactivated then reconstituted as a reserve unit in 1952. Inactivated in 1959 when parent wing implemented tri-deputate organization and all operational flying squadrons reassigned directly to the wing.

Activated in 1992 when parent wing implemented objective organization. Since reactivation in August 1992 coordinated operations of C-5 squadrons. Personnel and squadrons of the group participated in various contingency and humanitarian airlift operations, some to Asia and Africa and in support of the global war on terrorism since 11 September 2001.

=== Lineage ===
- Established as 1st Combat Cargo Group on 11 April 1944

Activated on 15 April 1944
Redesignated 512th Troop Carrier Group on 19 September 1945
Inactivated on 24 December 1945

- Redesignated 512th Troop Carrier Group, Medium on 4 August 1949

Activated in the Reserve on 2 September 1949
Ordered to Active Service on 15 March 1951
Inactivated on 1 April 1951

- Activated in the Reserve on 14 June 1952

Inactivated on 14 April 1959

- Redesignated: 512th Military Airlift Group on 31 July 1985 (Remained inactive)
- Redesignated: 512th Operations Group on 1 August 1992

Activated in the Reserve on 1 August 1992.

=== Assignments ===
- I Troop Carrier Command, 15 April 1944
- Eastern Air Command, 24 August 1944
- Combat Cargo Task Force, 14 September 1944
- Fourteenth Air Force, 20 December 1944
- Combat Cargo Task Force, 30 January 1945
- Tenth Air Force, 24 August–December 1945
- 512th Troop Carrier Wing, 2 September 1949 – 1 April 1951; 14 June 1952 – 14 April 1959
- 512th Airlift Wing, 1 August 1992–present

=== Components ===
- 1st Combat Cargo (later, 326th Troop Carrier; 326th Airlift) Squadron: 15 April 1944 – 16 June 1945; 2 September 1949 – 1 April 1951; 14 June 1952 – 14 April 1959; 1 August 1992–present
- 2d Combat Cargo (later, 327th Troop Carrier; 326th Airlift) Squadron: 15 April 1944 – 10 September 1945 (detached 1 July-10 September 1945); 2 September 1949 – 1 April 1951; 14 June 1952 – 14 April 1959.
- 3d Combat Cargo (later, 328th Troop Carrier;328th Airlift) Squadron: 15 April 1944 – 20 December 1945 (detached 23 June-20 August 1945 and 25 August-10 November 1945); 2 September 1949 – 1 April 1951; 14 June 1952 – 16 November 1957; 25 March 1958 – 14 April 1959
- 4th Combat Cargo (later, 329th Troop Carrier) Squadron: 15 April 1944 – 8 December 1945 (detached 5–24 September 1945); 2 September 1949 – 1 April 1951
- 709th Airlift Squadron: 1 August 1992–present

=== Aircraft ===
- C-47 Skytrain, 1944–1945
- C-46 Commando, 1945; 1949–1951; 1952–1957
- C-119 Flying Boxcar, 1957–1959
- C-5 Galaxy, 1992–present

=== Stations ===
- Bowman Field, Kentucky, 15 April 1944
- Baer Field, Indiana, 5–13 August 1944
- Sylhet Airfield, India, 29 August 1944
- Tulihal Airfield, India, 30 November 1944
- Tsuyung Airfield, China, 20 December 1944
- Dohazari Airfield, India, 30 January 1945
- Hathazari Airfield, India, 15 May 1945
- Myitkyina Airfield, Burma, June 1945
- Liuchow Airfield, China, 30 August 1945
- Kiangwan Airfield, China, 9 October-3 December 1945
- Camp Anza, California, 23–24 December 1945
- Reading Municipal Airport, Pennsylvania, 2 September 1949
- New Castle County Airport, Delaware, 1 May 1950 – 1 April 1951; 14 June 1952
- Willow Grove Naval Air Station, Pennsylvania, 20 July 1958 – 14 April 1959
- Dover AFB, Delaware, 1 August 1992–present

== See also ==
- Objective, Burma!
