= Hathazari (disambiguation) =

Hathazari is a town in Bangladesh. It may also refer to:

- Hathazari Upazila, a upazila in Bangladesh
- Hathazari Airfield, an airfield in Chittagong district
