= Royal Bengal =

Royal Bengal may refer to:

- Royal Bengal Airline, a dormant airline of Bangladesh
- Royal Bengal tiger, the national animal of India and Bangladesh

== See also ==
- Royal Bengal Rahashya (disambiguation)
