= Shanghai Airport =

Shanghai Airport may refer to:

- Shanghai Hongqiao International Airport, which primarily serves destinations within China
- Shanghai Pudong International Airport, which primarily serves international destinations
- Shanghai Longhua Airport, a former airport in use from 1922 to 2008
- Shanghai Jiangwan Airport, a former airport in use from 1945 to 1994
