= List of defunct airlines of Bangladesh =

This is a list of defunct airlines of Bangladesh

Airline	Image	Commenced operations	Ceased operations
Aero Bengal Airlines		1995	2000
Air Bangladesh		2000	2006
Air Parabat		1994	2001
Best Air		2007	2009
GMG Airlines		1997	2012
Mid Asia Airlines		2008	2009
Regent Airways		2010	2020
Royal Bengal Airline		2008	2009
THT Air Services		2008	2009
United Airways		2007	2016
Voyager Airlines Bangladesh		2002	2007
Zoom Airways		2002	2009
NXT AIR		2021	2024

== See also ==
- List of airlines of Bangladesh
- List of airports in Bangladesh
