= Basta railway station =

Railway station in India

Basta
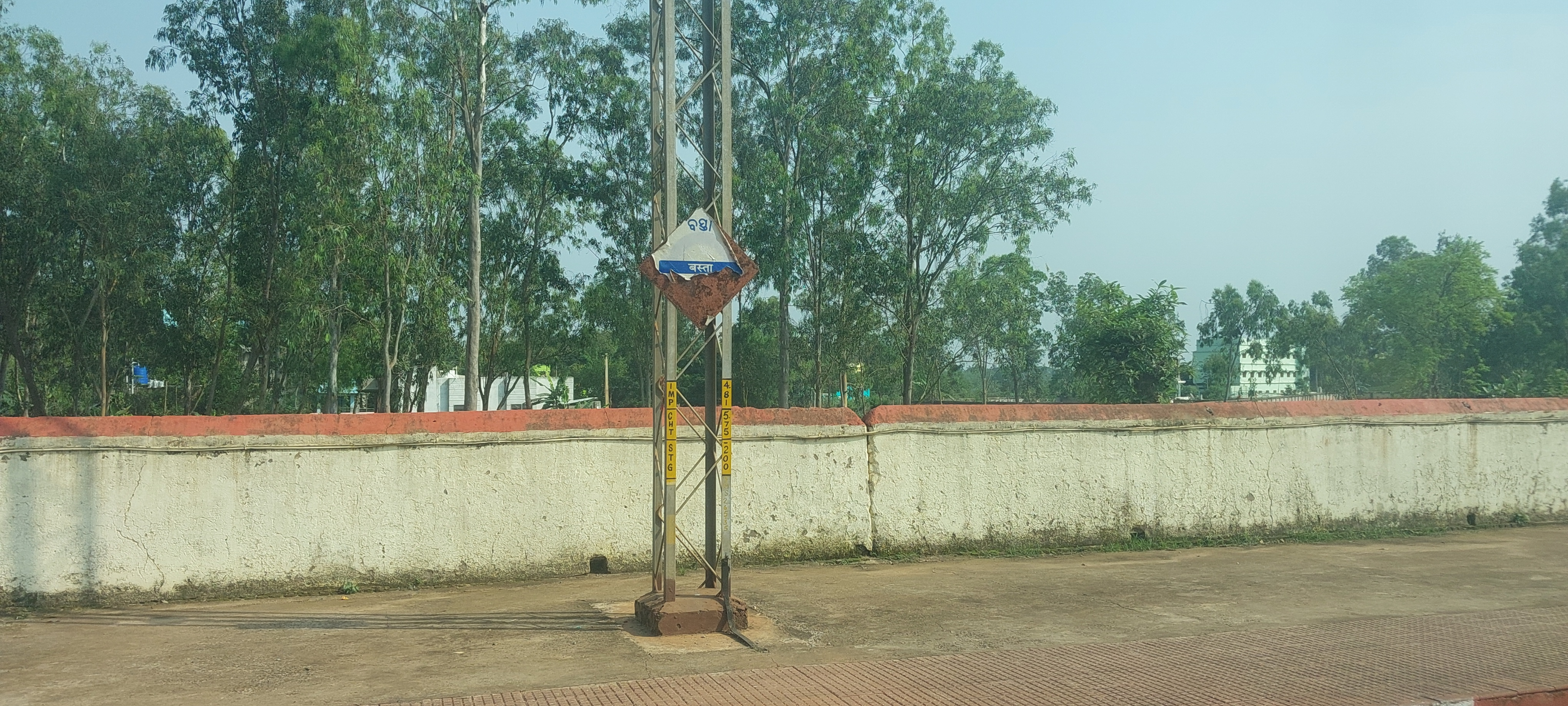

General information
- Location: Basta, Odisha; India
- Coordinates: 21°42′03″N 87°03′42″E
- System: Indian Railways station
- Owner: Ministry of Railways, Indian Railways
- Line: Howrah–Chennai main line
- Platforms: 3
- Tracks: 4

Construction
- Structure type: Standard (on ground)
- Parking: Yes

Other information
- Status: Functioning
- Station code: BTS
- Zone(s): South Eastern Railway
- Division(s): Kharagpur

Services
Preceding station	Indian Railways	Following station
Amarda Road towards Howrah Junction	South Eastern Railway zone Howrah–Chennai main line	Nuagaon Mayurbhanj Road towards Chennai Central
Location
- Location within India Location within Odisha

Basta railway station is a railway station on the South Eastern Railway network in the state of Odisha, India. It serves Basta and Baliapal. Its code is BTS. It has three platforms Passenger, Express and Superfast trains that halts at Basta railway station.

== Major trains ==
- Sri Jagannath Express
- Dhauli Express
- Simlipal Intercity Express
- Kalinga Utkal Express
- East coast Express

== See also ==
- Balasore district
