= GMG Airlines =

Bangladeshi airline

IATA	ICAO	Call sign
Z5	GMG	GMG
- Founded: 1997
- Commenced operations: 6 April 1998
- Ceased operations: 30 March 2012
- Hubs: Hazrat Shahjalal International Airport
- Fleet size: 5
- Destinations: 5
- Parent company: Beximco
- Headquarters: Dhaka, Bangladesh
- Key people: David Holleran; Asif Ahmed; Mizanur Rahman Siddique; Ashish Rai Choudhury
- Website: www.gmgairlines.com

GMG Airlines was an airline in Bangladesh. It was the country's first, and until recently, the largest private airline having been established in 1997, with its head office close to Dhaka airport in Nikunja-2, Dhaka, Bangladesh. It operated both domestic and international flights. Its primary hub was Shahjalal International Airport, located in Dhaka.

In 2009 Beximco Group bought a major stake in GMG Airlines. In October 2012, India provided a temporary maintenance and operational base at Netaji Subhas Chandra Bose International Airport in Kolkata. With no overseas assets, by 2012 GMG Airlines' only international flights were to Kathmandu, Nepal. On 28 March 2012, GMG announced suspension of operations pending acquisition of new fleet. It expected to resume operations later in 2012 but has remained suspended well into 2019. The company slogan was Explore.

== History ==
GMG Airline was established in 1997 and started domestic operations on 6 April 1998. Two brothers founded it; Nini Sattar and Shahab Sattar, owners of the GMG Industrial Corporation. International services were launched six years later on 8 September 2004, with service from Chittagong to Kolkata.

GMG began regular flights to Bangkok, Delhi and Kathmandu on 20 October 2006. It started services to Kuala Lumpur on 24 January 2007. The airline started its operation to the Middle East with daily flights to Dubai on 1 February 2008. In July 2010, GMG initiated flights to Jeddah and Riyadh. The airline also served Abu Dhabi and Karachi as well as domestic stations Jessore and Sylhet

In February 2008 the airline added a leased Boeing 747-300 to the fleet starting wide-body operations, this proved to be a White Elephant in an era which saw Global economic problems and an unprecedented peak in oil prices, thus causing a substantial loss to the carrier, the 747 was eventually phased out after just five months of service.

On 17 June 2009, the largest conglomerate of Bangladesh, BEXIMCO took a 50% stake in the airline, re-branding it and raising service standards to a higher level.

On 28 March 2012, GMG announced they would suspend all operations in preparation for re-fleeting the airline. It expected to resume operations later in 2013 but years later in January 2022, this situation remains unchanged. In 2013, India provided temporary maintenance and an operational base at Kolkata. With no overseas assets, GMG international operations consisted solely of flights between Kolkata and Kathmandu in 2014.

As of 30 May 2016, Sonali Bank said GMG Airlines owed the bank over Tk 2.28 billion. Sonali Bank attempted to have an auction of owner Salman F. Rahman's home, which was collateral for the loan. According to CEO Sanjiv Kapoor "[GMG's] operations will be temporarily suspended with effect from Mar 30, as we await the delivery of new-generation aircraft, clear legacy issues, execute the rightsizing and organize ourselves better to take up the future challenges". GMG has stated it is planning to adopt a new business strategy in light of rising fuel prices and changing international competitive environment through a 360 degree restructure of its strategy, organization, fleet, and business model. It will redesign its route network to focus on higher yield, higher growth domestic and regional routes using new generation narrow-body aircraft.

== Destinations ==
At the time of closure in March 2012, GMG were operating internationally to Kolkata, as well as domestic services between Dhaka and Chittagong.

== Fleet ==
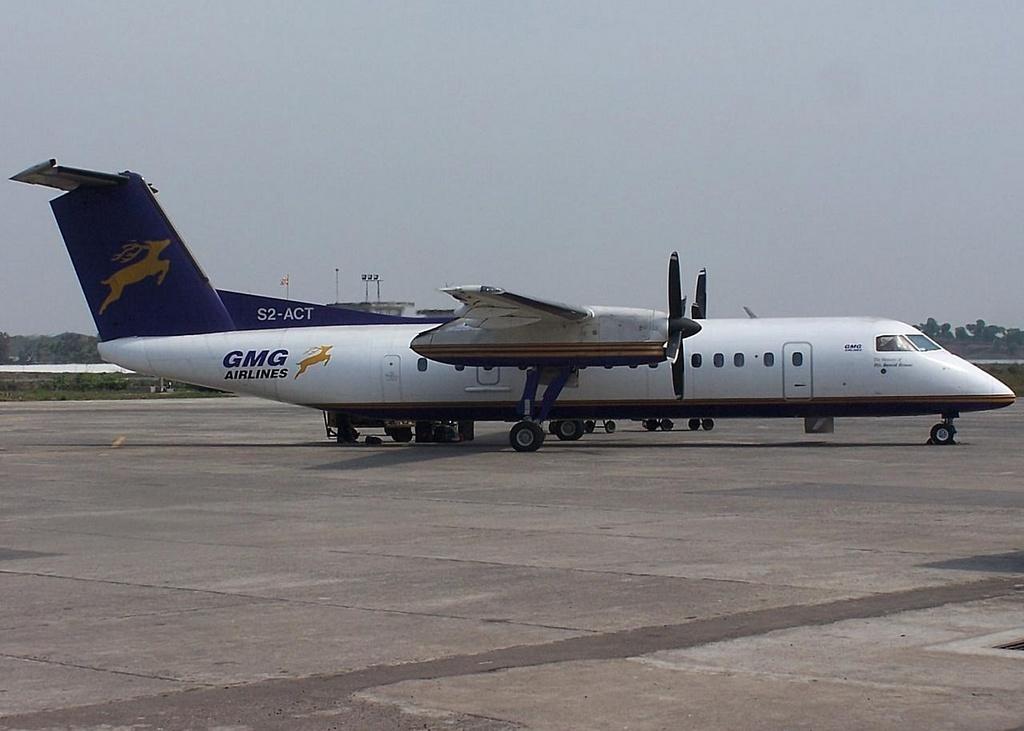
GMG Airlines Bombardier Dash 8 300

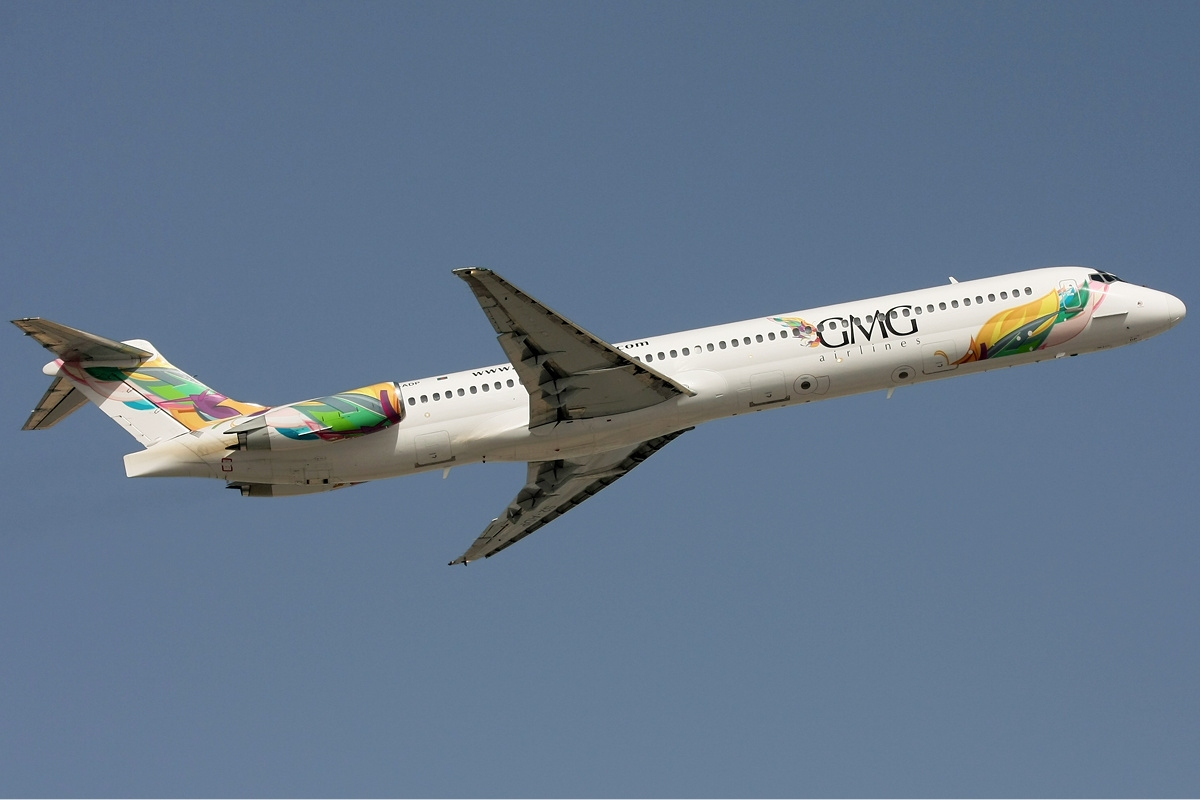
GMG Airlines McDonnell Douglas MD-83

=== Last fleet ===
As of March 2012, the fleet consisted of the following aircraft, though only the Dash-8 were operational at the time:

GMG fleet
Aircraft	In fleet	Orders	Seats	Notes
Bombardier Dash 8 100	1	—	37	
Bombardier Dash 8 300	1	—	50	
McDonnell Douglas MD-82	2	—	150	
McDonnell Douglas MD-83	1	—	153	
Total	5	—		

== See also ==
- List of defunct airlines of Bangladesh
