= Royal Bengal Rahashya =

Royal Bengal Rahashya (lit. 'Royal Bengal Secret') may mean

- Royal Bengal Rahashya (novel), by Satyajit Ray in the Feluda series
- Royal Bengal Rahashya (film), 2011 Indian film by Sandip Ray based on the novel

== See also ==
- Royal Bengal (disambiguation)
- Rahasyam (disambiguation)
