= NXT Air =

Bangladeshi Cargo Airline

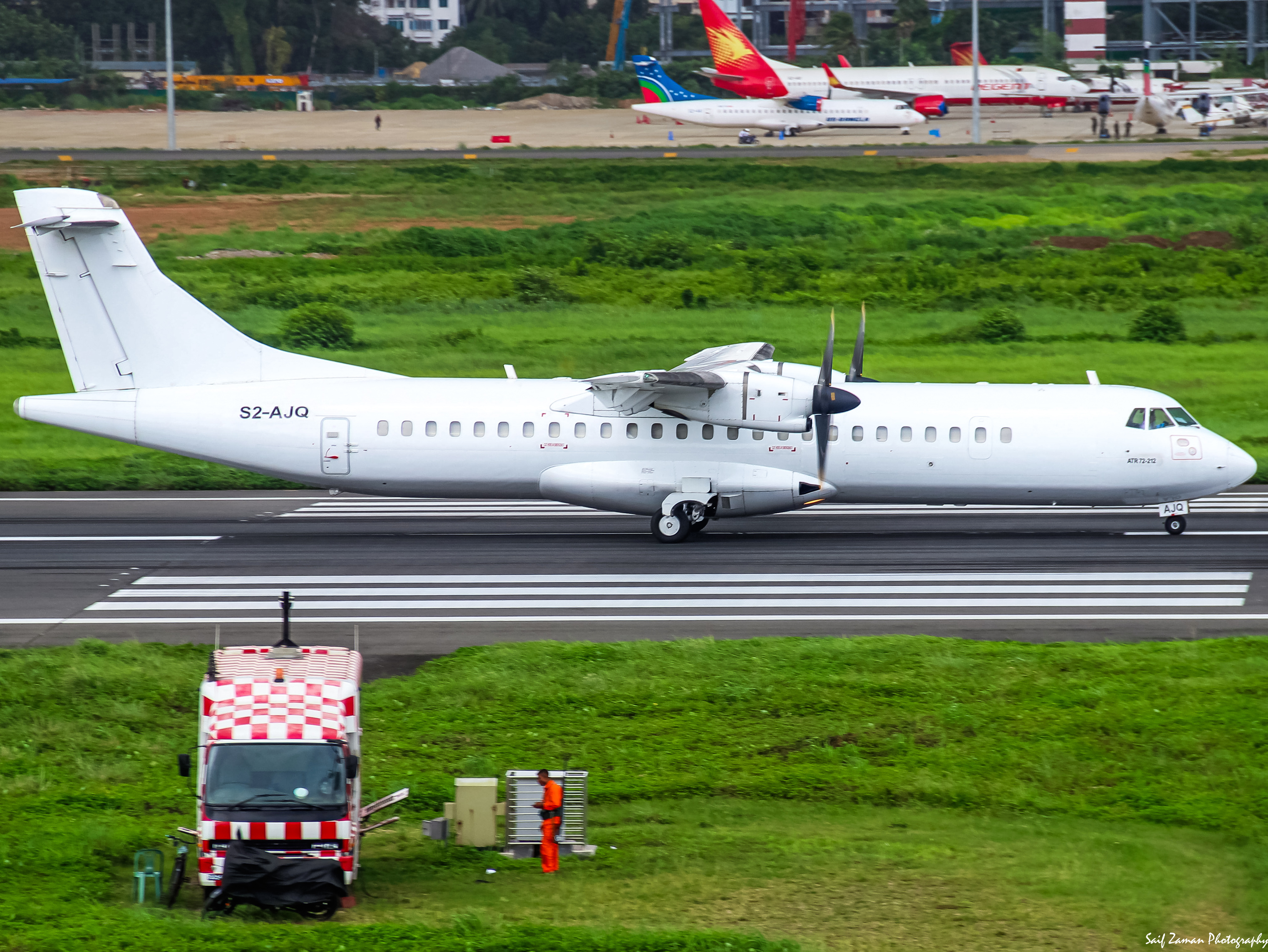
IATA	ICAO	Call sign
—	NXA	—
- Founded: 2021; 5 years ago
- Commenced operations: January 2022; 4 years ago
- Ceased operations: January 2024; 2 years ago
- Hubs: Hazrat Shahjalal International Airport; Cox's Bazar Airport

NXT Air, owned by Nixmo, is a cargo airline based in Bangladesh. Founded in 2021, it operated domestic cargo flights using ATR freighter aircraft before suspending operations in 2024.

== History ==
In December 2021, NXT Air received a no objection certificate and took delivery of its first aircraft, an ATR 72-212F, (registration S2-AJQ) from owner ACIA Aero. NXT Air initially established its home base at Cox's Bazar Airport, which served as the hub for its scheduled cargo services to Chittagong, Jessore, Cox's Bazar, and Dhaka

They had also purchased an ATR 42-300 from Hello Airlines, who still operated the aircraft at the time, as NXT Air had not received its AOC. The Civil Aviation Authority of Bangladesh (CAAB) awarded an air operator's certificate (AOC) to NXT Air on 24 January 2022. The airline reportedly planned to add a second ATR 72 by the end of February of that year and a Boeing 737-800 freighter later. The airline commenced domestic services on 29 January 2022 from its central hub at Cox's Bazar International Airport.

NXT Air provided domestic cargo charter flights, carrying live shrimp domestically from Cox's Bazar international Airport to Jessore Airport. They were also working alongside Kuwait Airways to transport personal effects from Hazrat Shahjalal International Airport to Shah Amanat International Airport. The airline suspended operations in January 2024 to reorganize, with no updates as of November 2025.

== Accidents and incidents ==
On 5 June 2022, An NXT Air ATR 42-300 (registration S2-AHI) was conducting a domestic ferry flight from Shah Amanat International Airport in Chittagong to Cox's Bazar International Airport. During take-off from runway 23, the aircraft experienced a main wheel detachment; the outboard left-hand wheel assembly separated from its axle and was later found near the end of the opposite runway (05). The flight continued and prior to landing, the flight crew made a few low passes to confirm about the missing wheel assembly. The aircraft made a safe landing at its destination. The accident was caused by the aircraft being stored for 2 years with limited preventive maintenance of the lubrication of the main landing gear wheel and its associated components, leading to the formation of static corrosion.

== See also ==
- List of defunct airlines of Bangladesh
