= Air Bangladesh =

Bangladeshi airline

IATA	ICAO	Call sign
B9	BGD	AIR BANGLA
- Founded: 2000
- Ceased operations: 2005

Air Bangladesh was an airline based in Bangladesh. It was founded in 2000 and dissolved in 2005.

== History ==
As of 2006, Air Bangladesh was banned from entering EU airspace. The reasons for this decision were safety deficiencies, as well as poor transparency of the airline's operations. the Commission assessed that Air Bangladesh should be submitted to a strict operational restriction.

== Fleet ==
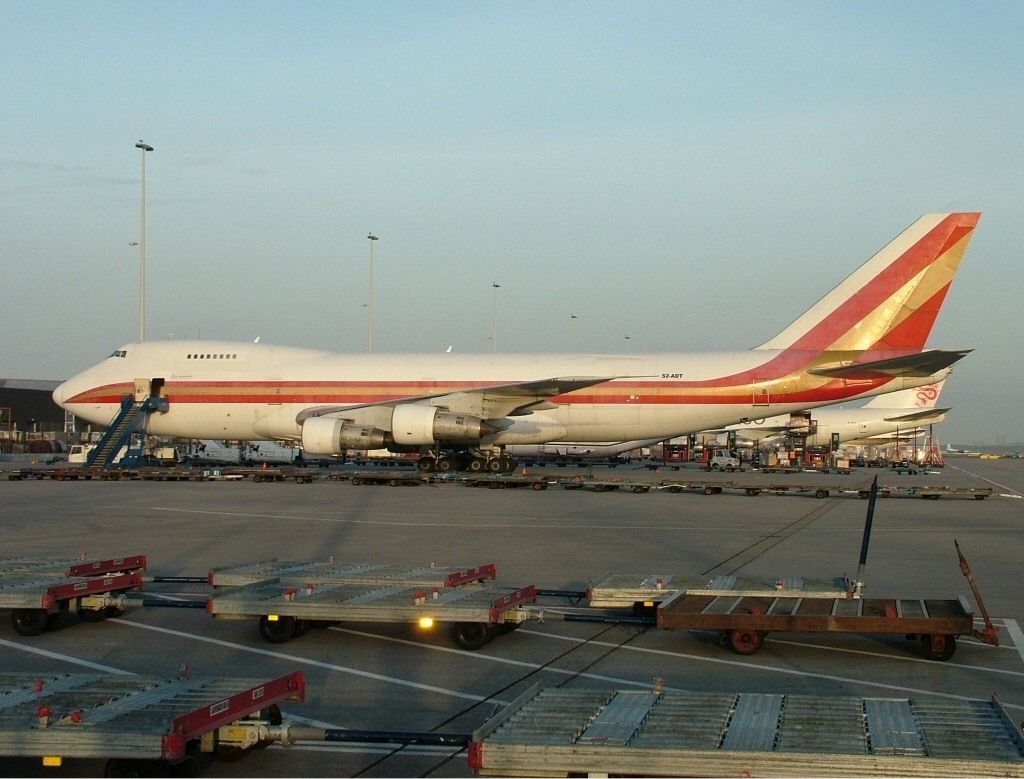
Air Bangladesh Boeing 747-200F

Air Bangladesh (no relation to Biman Bangladesh Airlines) operated only one older jet aircraft, a Boeing 747-269B(SF) (registration S2-ADT). The aircraft was acquired by Air Bangladesh in August 2004 and was still painted in basic Kalitta Air colors.

== See also ==
- List of defunct airlines of Bangladesh
