= Aero Bengal Airlines =

First privately owned airline in Bangladesh

- Commenced operations: 1995
- Ceased operations: 2000
- Hubs: Hazrat Shahjalal International Airport
- Focus cities: Shah Amanat International Airport; Barishal Airport; Cox's Bazar International Airport; Shamshernagar Airport

Aero Bengal Airlines was a Bangladeshi private airline that operated from 1995 until around 2000. It was the first privately owned airline in Bangladesh after deregulation of the aviation sector, and was based in Dhaka.

== History ==
Aero Bengal was established in Dhaka on July 17, 1995, to offer scheduled services to local destinations, beginning three daily flights between Dhaka and Barishal. Flights commenced during the summer with two Harbin Y-12s and one Antonov An-24. Aero Bengal Airlines was also the first passenger aircraft operator to Barishal Airport, which had opened flight operations the same year as the airline.

In July 1997, services were stopped after the Civil Aviation Authority of Bangladesh (CAAB) halted operation of the Antonov AN-24 on the Dhaka - Chittagong route because Aero Bengal had no ownership papers for the aircraft, as it had been leased. Operation of the two Harbin Y-12s was also suspended for routine inspection of their propellers. The airline planned to resume operations of the AN-24 the following week, and the propellers of the Harbin Y-12s were sent to Singapore for detailed examination, with the airline intending to restart flights within three weeks. It is also reported at this time that Aero Bengal owed Tk 1.2 million (~£14,000 to 16,000) to the CAAB.

Despite these plans, Aero Bengal's services did not fully resume during this period, and the airline's operational difficulties continued, ultimately returning its entire fleet to their parent companies in July 1998 and ceasing operations entirely by 2000.

== Fleet ==
At the time of the airline ceasing operations, the airline used two Harbin Y-12s, one registration S2-AAR serving the airline from 1998 onwards, and the other registered S2-AAQ, and an Antonov An-24, both leased, and eventually returned a short while later with no plans of purchasing during the lease.

== See also ==
- List of defunct airlines of Bangladesh
