= Zoom Airways =

Bangladeshi airline

IATA	ICAO	Call sign
3Z	ZAW	ZED AIR
- Founded: August 2002
- Ceased operations: 2009
- Hubs: Shahjalal International Airport
- Fleet size: 4
- Destinations: charter
- Headquarters: Dhaka, Bangladesh

Zoom Airways was a cargo airline based in Dhaka, Bangladesh.

== History ==
Formed in 2002 as Z-Airways and Services, the airline operated cargo charter flights in Bangladesh and in the South Asia region. In 2005, the airline was renamed to Zoom Airways. It ceased operations in 2009.

== Fleet ==
As of December 2008, the Zoom Airways fleet consisted of the following aircraft:

- 1 BAe 748 Series 2B
- 2 Boeing 737
- 1 Lockheed L-1011-500 Tristar

== See also ==
- List of defunct airlines of Bangladesh
