= Tangail Airport =

Abandoned airport in Tangail, Bangladesh

Coordinates: 24°13′47″N 089°54′28″E

- IATA: none; ICAO: none

Summary
- Airport type: Military
- Operator: Civil Aviation Authority of Bangladesh
- Serves: Tangail
- Location: Bangladesh
- Built: 1967
- Elevation AMSL: 177 ft (54 m)

Map
- Location of Tangail Airport in Bangladesh

Runways
| Direction | Length | | Surface |
| Direction | ft | m | Surface |
|---|---|---|---|
| | | | Grass |
- Source: Landings.com

Tangail Airport is an airstrip in Tangail, in central Bangladesh. The airport was built in 1967 to serve Tangail District and other nearby districts, mainly for agricultural purposes. Several cargo airbuses were used in the 1970s to spread pesticides in the local paddy fields. The airport has remained unmaintained since 1976 due to the local administration's negligence. The airport has been used for Bangladesh Air Force training.

== See also ==
- List of airports in Bangladesh
