= 327 Squadron =

327 Squadron may refer to:

- No. 327 Squadron RAF, a Royal Air Force unit in World War II
- 327th Aero Squadron, an aero squadron in the Air Service, United States Army
- 327th Airlift Squadron, United States Air Force
- 327th Bombardment Squadron, United States
- 327th Fighter Squadron, United States Army Air Forces
- 327th Fighter-Interceptor Squadron, United States Air Force
- 327th Troop Carrier Squadron, United States Army Air Forces
