= 69th Air Division =

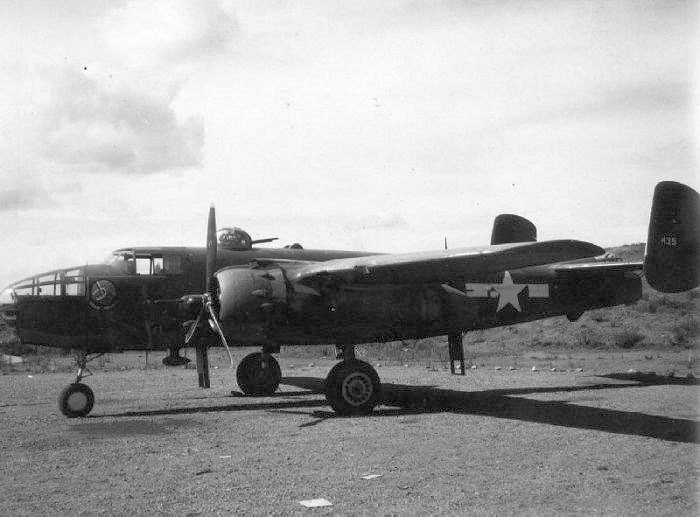
- B-25 Mitchell of the 341st Bombardment Group
- Active: 1943–1945, 1947–1949
- Country: United States
- Branch: United States Air Force
- Role: Command of tactical airlift forces
- Engagements: China-Burma-India Theater
- Decorations: Distinguished Unit Citation

The 69th Air Division is an inactive United States Air Force organization. Its last assignment was with Tactical Air Command, assigned to Ninth Air Force at Greater Pittsburgh Airport, Pennsylvania. It was inactivated on 24 June 1949.

== History ==
"Activated in China in 1943, the wing engaged in sea sweeps and attacks against Japanese inland shipping. Between late 1943 and 1945 its units bombed and strafed such targets as trains, harbors, railroads in French Indochina, and the Canton Hong Kong area of South China. These units also provided air support to Chinese ground troops. Fighter aircraft defended Allied air bases, the eastern terminus of The Hump route, and the bases in the area of Kunming and attacked bridges, oil and gas storage facilities, supply dumps, convoys, and enemy troop concentrations. After the Japanese surrender, the 69th's troop carrier aircraft ferried troops and supplies in China, helped to evacuate prisoners of war, and flew mercy missions in China, French Indochina, and Manchuria."

"It activated in the Reserves in 1947 and performed training duties until June 1949."

== Lineage ==
- Established as the 69 Bombardment Wing on 9 August 1943

Activated on 3 September 1943
Redesignated 69 Composite Wing on 21 December 1943
Inactivated on 26 December 1945

- Redesignated 69 Troop Carrier Wing on 28 January 1947

Activated in the Reserve on 23 March 1947
Redesignated 69 Air Division, Troop Carrier on 16 April 1948
Inactivated on 27 June 1949
Redesignated 69 Air Division on 1 September 1959 (remained inactive)

=== Assignments ===
- Fourteenth Air Force, 3 September 1943
- Tenth Air Force, 24 August – 26 December 1945
- Eleventh Air Force, 23 March 1947
- First Air Force, 1 July 1948
- Ninth Air Force, 23 February – 27 June 1949

=== Stations ===
- Kunming Airport, China, 3 September 1943
- Tsuyung Airfield, China, c. 12 January 1944
- Kunming Airport, China, by 30 April 1944 – c. 26 December 1945
- Greater Pittsburgh Airport, Pennsylvania, 23 March 1947 – 27 June 1949.

=== Components ===
- 51st Fighter Group: 2 October 1943 – c. 26 December 1945
- 341st Bombardment Group: 26 December 1943 – 21 June 1945; 1 – 25 August 1945
- 375th Troop Carrier Group: 17 October 1947 – 27 June 1949
- 419th Troop Carrier Group: 17 October 1947 – 27 June 1949
- 433d Troop Carrier Group: 17 October 1947 – 27 June 1949
- 436th Troop Carrier Group: 1 July 1948 – 27 June 1949

== See also ==
- List of United States Air Force air divisions
