= Barishal Airport =

Domestic airport in Barisal, Bangladesh

Barishal Airport বরিশাল বিমানবন্দর
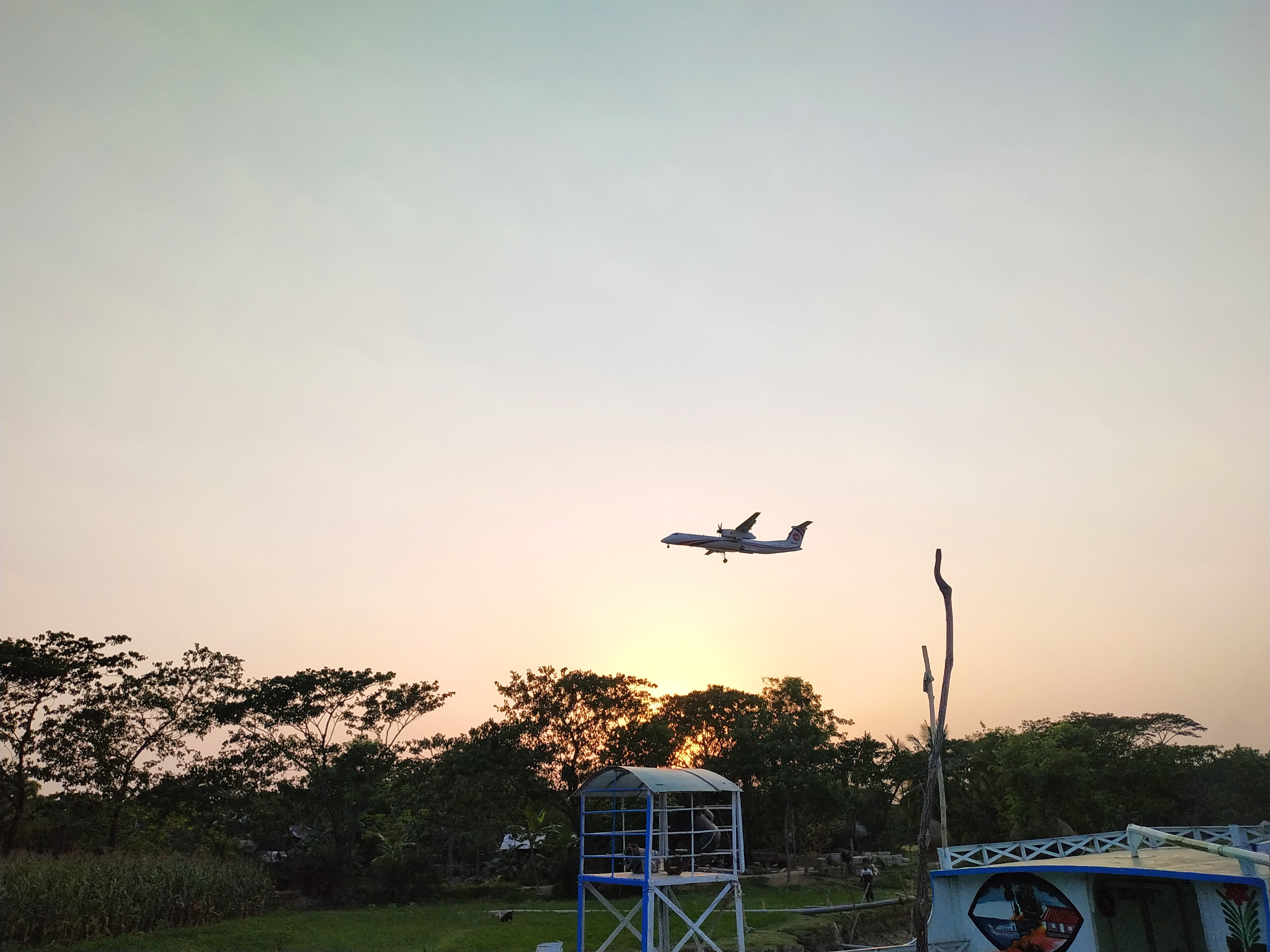
- Plane taking off at Barishal Airport
- IATA: BZL; ICAO: VGBR

Summary
- Airport type: Public
- Operator: Civil Aviation Authority of Bangladesh
- Serves: Barisal & Kuakata
- Elevation AMSL: 10 ft (3.0 m)
- Coordinates: 22°48′04″N 90°18′04″E
- Website: barisalairport.com

Map
- Location of airport in Bangladesh

Runways
Direction	Length		Surface
Direction	ft	m	Surface
17/35	5,995	1,827	Asphalt

Statistics (January 2018 – January 2018)
- Passengers: 46,767 ▲
- Source: CEIC SkyVector

Barishal Airport (IATA: BZL, ICAO: VGBR) is a domestic airport in Bangladesh serving the southern city of Barisal as well as Barisal Division. The airport is located 12 km north of Barisal city centre alongside the Dhaka - Barishal Highway.

== Location ==
The airport is located close to Barisal city in the Rahamatpur area of Babuganj Upazila.

== History ==
Before it was re-constructed, there was a large demand for an airport in the region for quicker travel to the capital, Dhaka. Local organisations held many strikes and demonstrations to press for its construction. The airport was finally built in 1985 on 163 acres of land, at a cost of BDT 4 million. It was officially inaugurated by the then president Abdur Rahman Biswas on 3 December 1995. Aero Bengal Airlines, a private airline, was the first airline to launch flights to the airport. The national carrier, Biman Bangladesh, started their services in November 1995.

In 2007, the airport played a significant role during the relief operation in the aftermath of Cyclone Sidr in November 2007, virtually saving thousands of lives of the cyclone-affected people. The airport was instrumental in distributing international relief goods, including drinking water, rice, blankets, and other life-saving materials, reaching the devastated victims of the cyclone.

In April 2015, the national carrier Biman Bangladesh Airlines resumed weekly flights after nine years.

== Statistics ==
The airport has served 158,987 passengers between 1995 and 2009. Over 20,000 flights, including passenger, training, cargo, and others, had operated from the airport. The airport saw its highest number of passengers in 1999 and the highest number of flights in the year 2000.

== Airlines and destinations ==
Airlines	Destinations	Refs.
Biman Bangladesh Airlines	Dhaka	

== See also ==
- List of airports in Bangladesh
