= Shanghai Jiangwan Airport =

Former airport of Shanghai, China (1939–1994)

Shanghai Jiangwan Airport 上海江湾机场
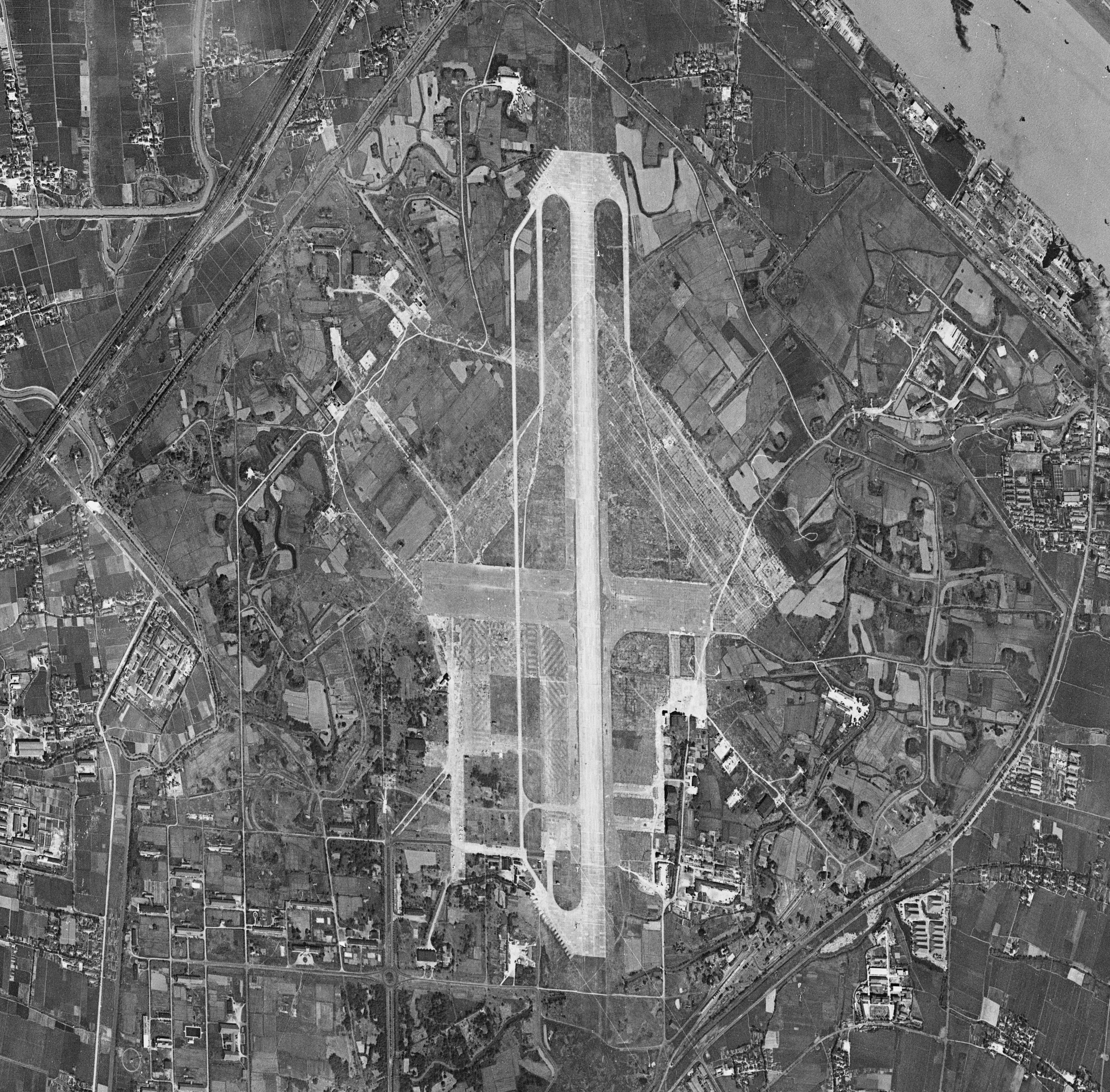
- IATA: none; ICAO: none

Summary
- Airport type: Defunct
- Serves: Shanghai
- Location: Yangpu, Shanghai, China
- Opened: 1939
- Closed: June 1994
- Coordinates: 31°19′51″N 121°30′28″E

Map
- Location of airport Jiangwan (China)

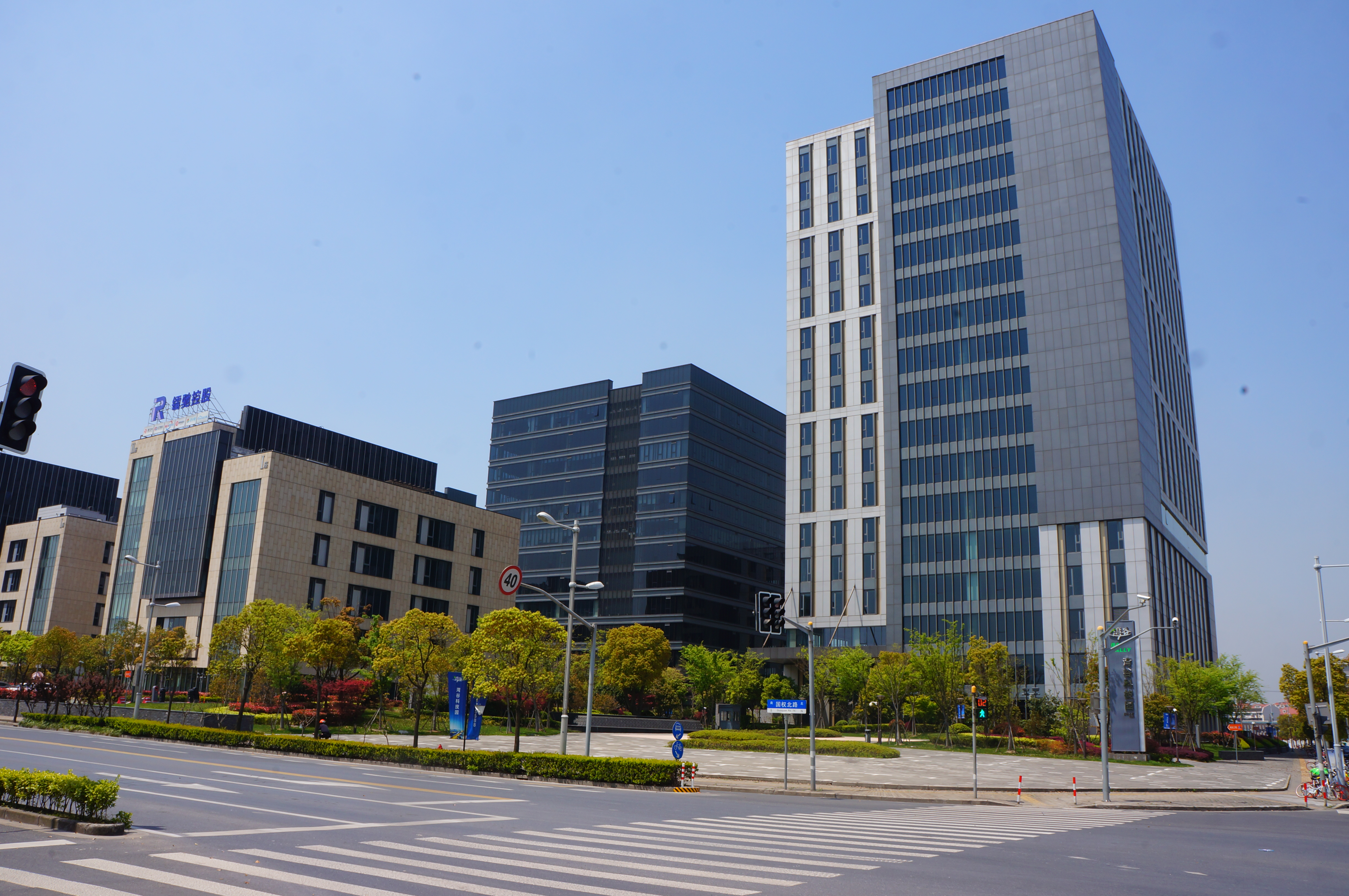
Wangu Science and Technology Park, located in New Jiangwan City, the former Jiangwan Airport

Shanghai Jiangwan Airport was a military airport located in Yangpu District of northeast Shanghai, China. It was closed in 1994 and the site has been redeveloped into the New Jiangwan City (新江湾城) neighbourhood.

== History ==
In 1939, Jiangwan Airport was originally constructed as a military airfield by forcibly requisitioning civilian farmland and demolishing Yinhang Town.

Formerly romanised as Kiangwan Airfield, the airport was at the end of World War II used by the United States Army Air Forces as the headquarters of the 1st Combat Cargo Group, its primary mission being the airlift of Chinese troops in and out of the Shanghai region. The airfield was also the home of the Air Technical Service Command "Shanghai Air Depot", which opened in October 1945 to supervise the deposition of Allied and captured Japanese aircraft in China. Kiangwan Airfield operated Air Transport Command services and flights from Shanghai as part of its Western Pacific Wing until 31 December 1947 when the ATC facilities were closed, and American forces left the area.

Jiangwan Airport remained in operation as a military airport under the People's Liberation Army from 1949 onward. After modifications, it became one of the airports in Asia with a relatively large land area, managed and used by the People's Liberation Army Air Force. In 1986, based on the approval of the State Council and the Central Military Commission, the airport was relocated to a site 7 kilometers southeast of Zhoupu Town, Nanhui County, freeing up 1,080 mu of land for municipal construction in Shanghai.

The airfield ceased operation in June 1994. The land was turned over to Shanghai municipal government 30 April, 1997. After years of disuse, the site evolved into a wetland hosting numerous native Shanghai flora and fauna, becoming a rare semi-natural green lung within the urban area of Shanghai. This sparked a debate within the Shanghai Municipal People's Government over whether to preserve or develop the area. Ultimately, due to a shortage of land for urban development, the Shanghai Municipal People's Government decided to proceed with development while maximizing the preservation of the original natural landscape and environmental protection. This land plot would known as "New Jiangwan City".

On 1 October 1999, the nearby Shanghai Pudong International Airport officially opened.
