= List of airports in Bangladesh =

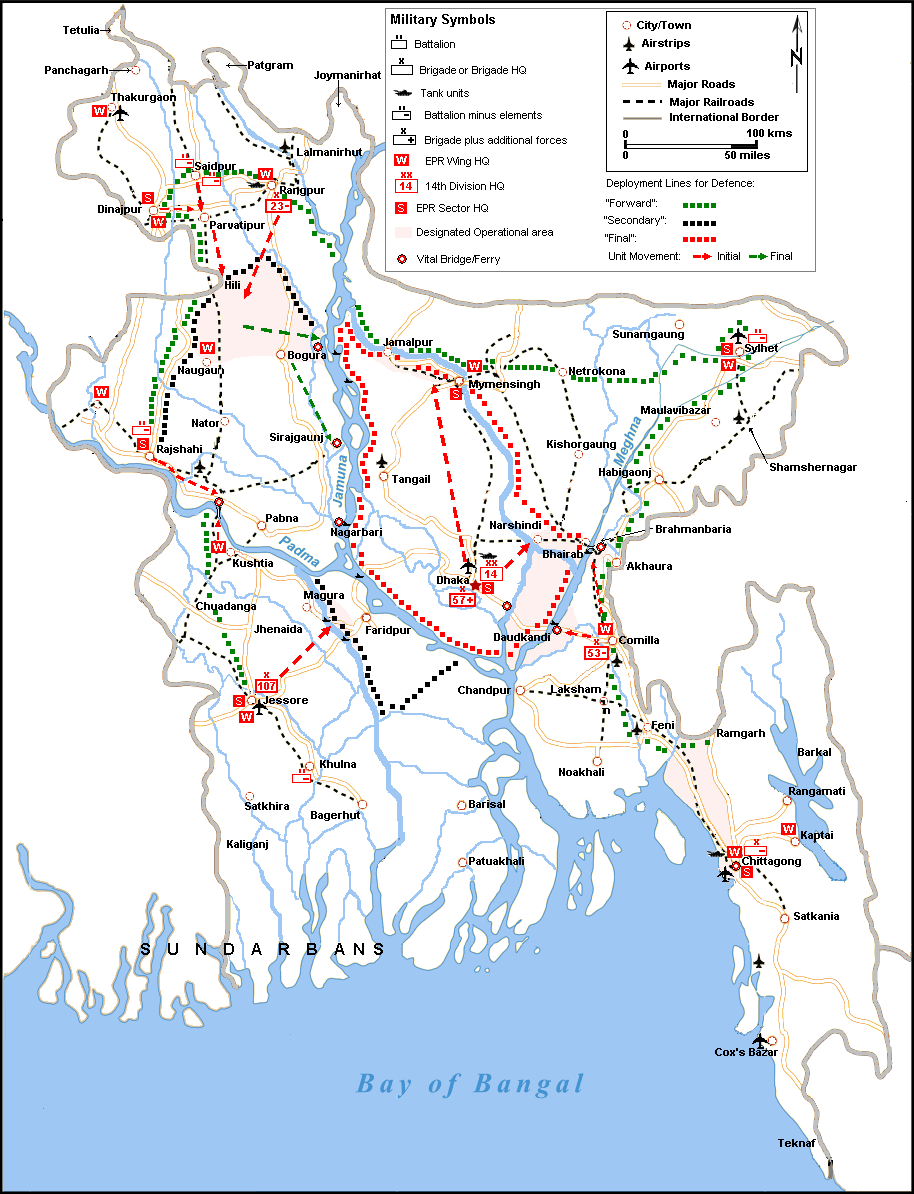
Transportation in Bangladesh

This is a list of airports in Bangladesh grouped by location. All airports are operated and maintained by the Civil Aviation Authority of Bangladesh under the Ministry of Civil Aviation and Tourism. Some of the airfields are used for military and training purposes by the Bangladesh Armed Forces.

Bangladesh has four domestic airports, three international airports (which are also used for domestic flights) and four short take-off and landing ports (STOLports), with one new domestic airport under construction. It also has several airstrips, some built during World War II.

== Classification ==
=== Airport category ===
Category	Role
International	Handles international and domestic flights
Domestic	Handles domestic flights
STOLport	Short take off and landing airports
Defence	Military Airbase
Abandoned	Abandoned or unused airport

=== Airport status ===
Airport Functional Status	Description
Operational	Implies airport has active commercial service for public use airports.
Non-operational	Implies airport currently has no active commercial service but had or will have commercial service.
Proposed or under construction	Implies airport is proposed or under construction.

== List of airports ==
All airports are listed by division. No airports are situated in the Mymensingh Division.

=== Barishal Division ===
Location served	Airport name	ICAO	IATA	Category	Status	Coordinates
Barishal	Barishal Airport	VGBR	BZL	Domestic	Operational	22°48′04″N 90°18′04″E
Patuakhali	Patuakhali Airport	—	—	Abandoned	Non Operational	22°22′33″N 90°19′20″E

=== Chittagong Division ===
Location served	Airport name	ICAO	IATA	Category	Status	Coordinates
Chittagong	Shah Amanat International Airport	VGEG	CGP	International	Operational	22°14′59″N 91°48′48″E
Cox's Bazar	Cox's Bazar Airport	VGCB	CXB	Domestic	Operational	21°27′07″N 91°57′50″E
Comilla	Comilla Airport	VGCM	CLA	STOLport	Non Operational	23°26′12″N 91°11′24″E
Noakhali	Noakhali Airport	—	—	Defence	Military Airbase	22°44′21″N 91°03′54″E
Dohazari	Dohazari Airfield	—	—	Abandoned	Non Operational	22°09′55″N 92°04′07″E
Chakaria	Chakaria Airport	—	—	Defence	Military Airbase	21°45′49″N 92°04′18″E
Feni	Feni Airfield	—	—	Abandoned	Non Operational	23°02′06″N 91°23′37″E
Hathazari	Hathazari Airfield	—	—	Abandoned	Non Operational	22°30′02″N 91°48′27″E
Sandwip	Sandwip Airport	—	—	STOLport	Non Operational	22°40′00″N 91°10′00″E

=== Dhaka Division ===
Location served	Airport name	ICAO	IATA	Category	Status	Coordinates
Dhaka	Hazrat Shahjalal International Airport	VGHS	DAC	International	Operational	23°50′34″N 90°24′02″E
Tejgaon	Tejgaon Airport	VGTJ	—	Defence	Military Airbase	23°46′43″N 90°22′57″E
Bajitpur	Bajitpur Airport	—	—	Defence	Military Airbase	24°12′44″N 90°54′23″E
Tangail	Tangail Airport	—	—	Defence	Military Airbase	24°13′47″N 89°54′28″E

=== Khulna Division ===
Location served	Airport name	ICAO	IATA	Category	Status	Coordinates
Jessore	Jashore Airport	VGJR	JSR	Domestic	Operational	23°11′01″N 89°09′39″E
Bagerhat	Khan Jahan Ali Airport	—	—	Domestic	Under- construction on hold since 2019	22°38′49″N 89°38′38″E

=== Rajshahi Division ===
Location served	Airport name	ICAO	IATA	Category	Status	Coordinates
Rajshahi	Shah Makhdum Airport	VGRJ	RJH	Domestic	Operational	24°26′13″N 88°36′59″E
Ishwardi	Ishwardi Airport	VGIS	IRD	STOLport	Non Operational	24°09′11″N 89°02′55″E
Bogura	Bogura Airport	VGBG	—	Defense	Military Airbase	24°52′00″N 89°18′59″E

=== Rangpur Division ===
Location served	Airport name	ICAO	IATA	Category	Status	Coordinates
Saidpur	Saidpur Airport	VGSD	SPD	Domestic	Operational	25°45′33″N 88°54′31″E
Thakurgaon	Thakurgaon Airport	VGSG	TKR	STOLport	Non Operational	26°00′59″N 88°24′06″E
Lalmonirhat	Lalmonirhat Airport	VGLM	—	Defence	Military Airbase	25°53′15″N 89°25′59″E

=== Sylhet Division ===
Location served	Airport name	ICAO	IATA	Category	Status	Coordinates
Sylhet	Osmani International Airport	VGSY	ZYL	International	Operational	24°57′48″N 91°52′01″E
Moulvibazar	Shamshernagar Airport	VGSH	ZHM	Defense	Military Airbase	24°23′54″N 91°55′01″E

== Gallery ==
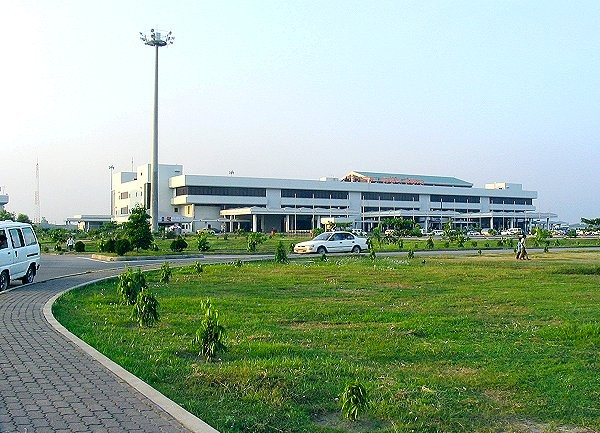
Shah Amanat International Airport in Chittagong

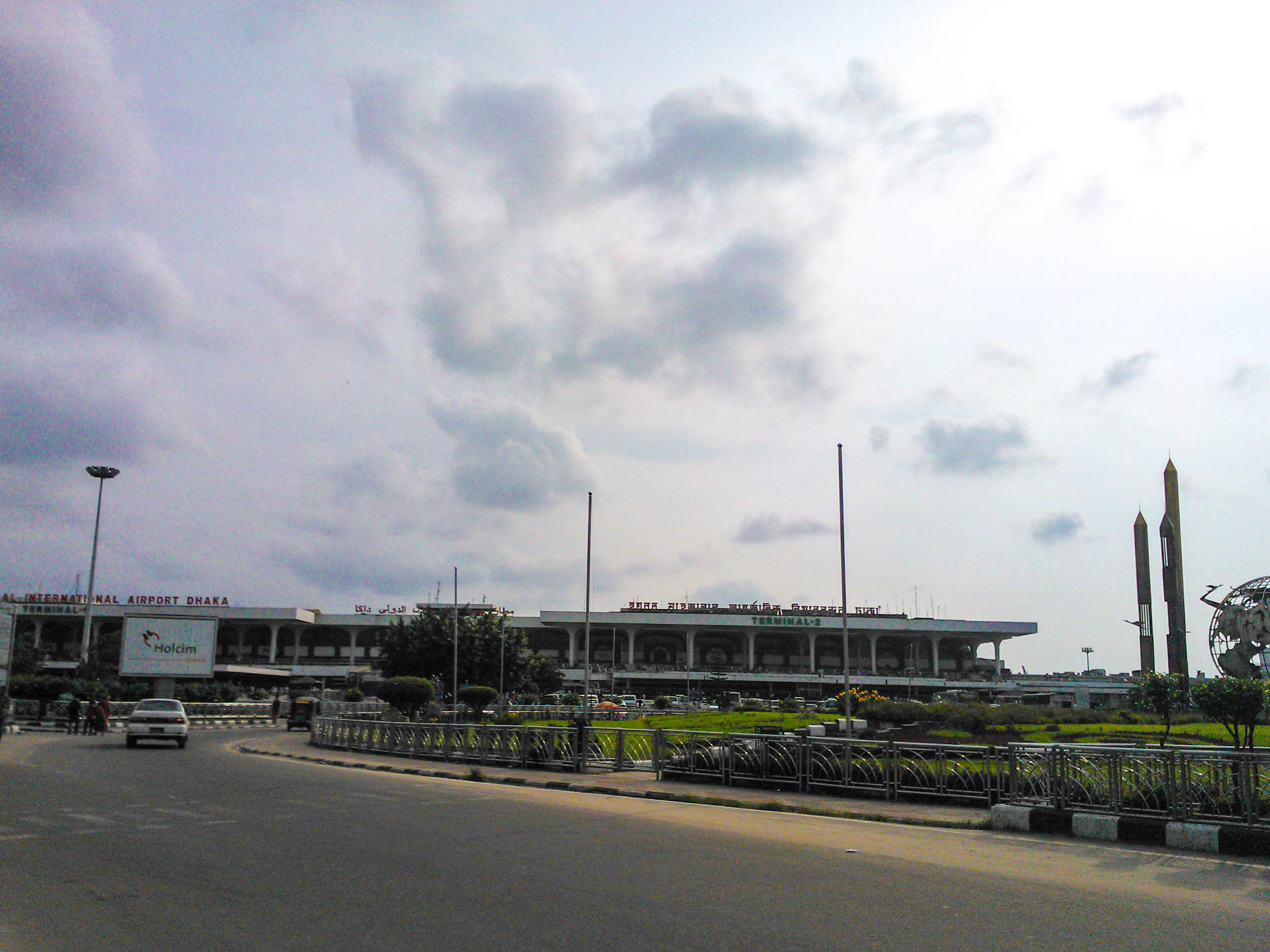
Shahjalal International Airport in Dhaka

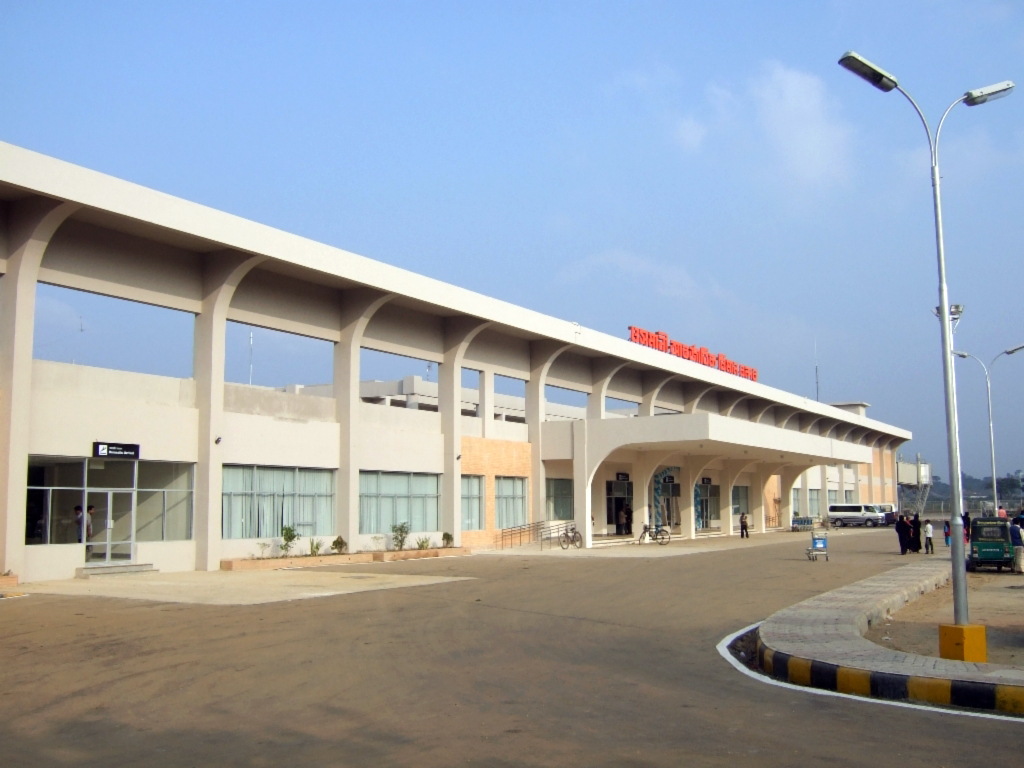
Osmani International Airport in Sylhet

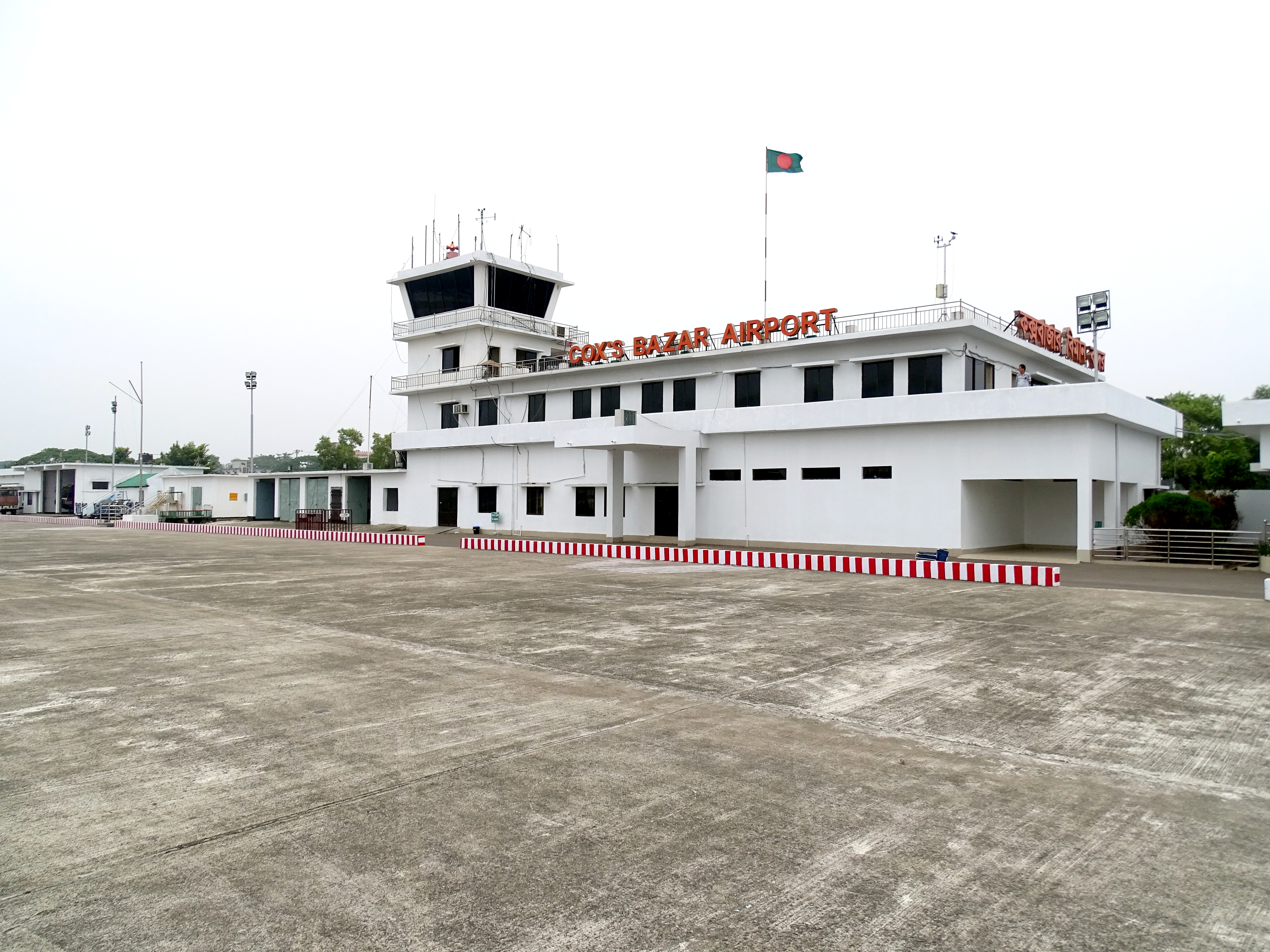
Cox's Bazar International Airport in Cox's Bazar

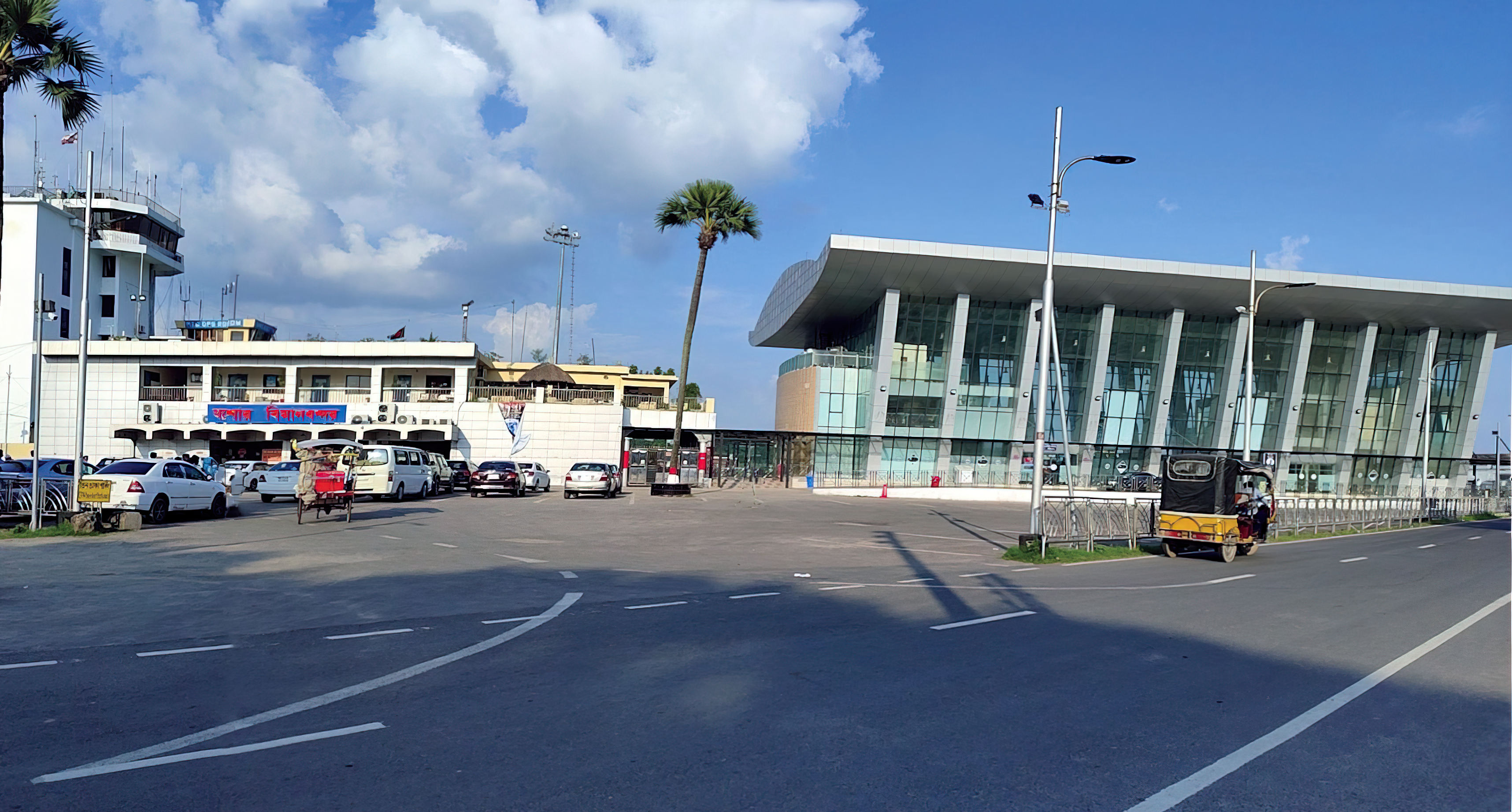
Jashore Airport in Jashore

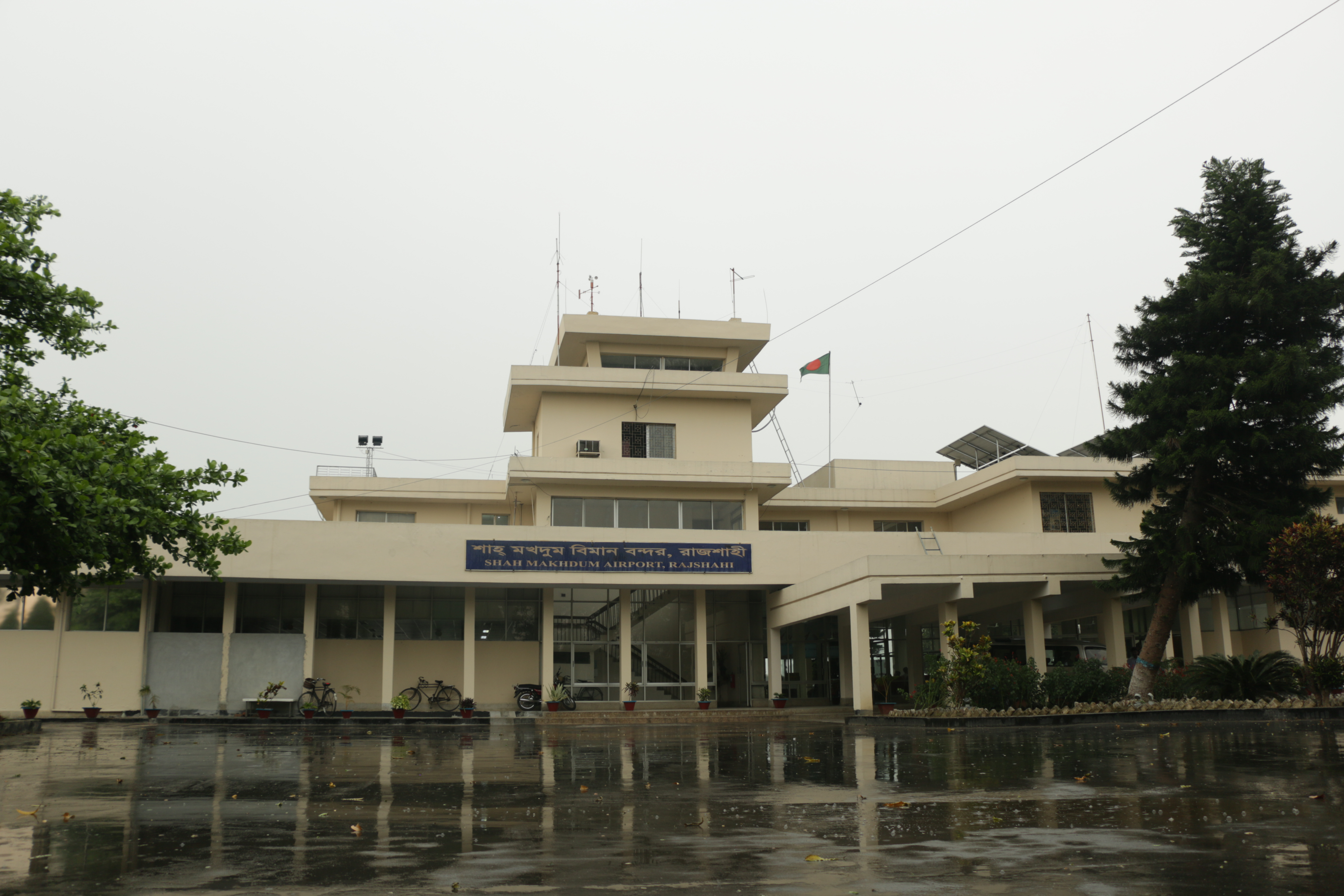
Shah Makhdum Airport in Rajshahi

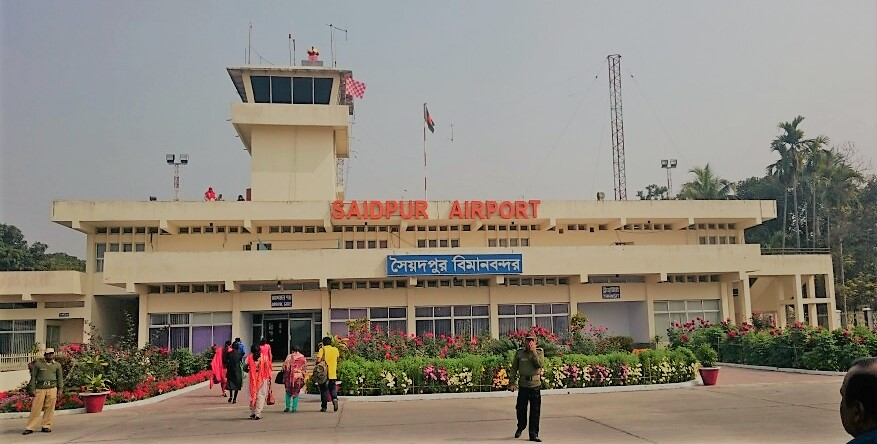
Saidpur Airport in Saidpur

== See also ==
- Transport in Bangladesh
