= Fenny Airfield =

Abandoned airfield in Bangladesh

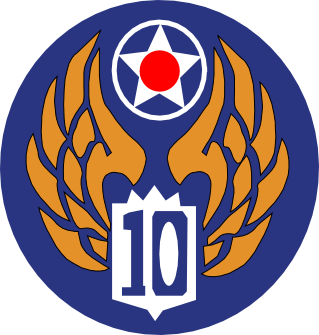
Fenny Airfield
- Part of Tenth Air Force
- Feni District, Bangladesh

Site information
- Type: Military airfield
- Controlled by: United States Army Air Forces

Location
- Location within Bangladesh
- Coordinates: 23°02′06″N 091°23′37″E

Site history
- Built: 1944
- In use: 1944–1945
- Battles/wars: Burma Campaign 1944–1945

Feni Airfield or Fenny Airfield is a former wartime United States Army Air Forces airfield located in Feni District, Bangladesh used during the Burma Campaign 1944–1945 of World War II. The airfield is now abandoned.

== History ==
Feni was the primary home of the Tenth Air Force 12th Bombardment Group, which flew B-25 Mitchell medium bombers from the airfield after its reassignment from Twelfth Air Force in southern Italy. The group operated from Feni from July 1944 until June 1945, flying combat missions over Burma supporting the British Fourteenth Army. When Allied forces at Imphal, India, were threatened by a Japanese offensive, the group delivered ammunition and other supplies. In addition to the bombers, the 12th Combat Cargo Squadron used Fenny to air drop supplies and ammunition to the ground forces. Fenny was also used as a communications station and an Air Technical Service Command maintenance depot.

In 2006, the former airfield spanning 49.5 acres was transformed into the site of the Feni Girls' Cadet College.

== See also ==
- List of airports in Bangladesh
