= 327th Signal Battalion (United States) =

Signal battalion of the United States Army from 1952 to 2007

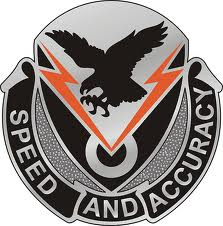
- 327th Signal Battalion Insignia
- Country: United States
- Branch: Signal Corps
- Role: Signal
- Motto(s): Speed and Accuracy
- Mascot(s): Nighthawks

The 327th Signal Battalion of the United States Army was initially constituted on May 26, 1952, in the Organized Reserve Corps as the Headquarters and Headquarters Company, 327th Signal Support Battalion, and activated in Tampa, Florida, on June 30, 1952. Over the years, the battalion underwent several reorganizations and redesignations, notably becoming part of the Regular Army in 1967 and being activated at Fort Bragg, North Carolina.

The battalion also includes the histories of the 416th and 221st Signal Companies, which were integrated into the battalion through reorganizations. It was eventually inactivated in April 2007 at Fort Bragg.

== History ==
The following is an abbreviated history of the 327th Signal Battalion:

- The unit was constituted on 26 May 1952 in the Organized Reserve Corps as Headquarters and Headquarters Company, 327th Signal Support Battalion
- It was officially activated 30 June 1952 at Tampa, Florida

(Organized Reserve Corps redesignated 9 July 1952 as the Army Reserve)

- The unit was reorganized and redesignated 15 September 1953 as Headquarters and Headquarters Detachment, 327th Signal Battalion
- Inactivated 7 July 1959 at Tampa, Florida
- Withdrawn 18 April 1967 from the Army Reserve and allotted to the Regular Army
- Activated 1 August 1967 at Fort Bragg, North Carolina
- Reorganized and redesignated 16 September 1980 as Headquarters and Headquarters Company, 327th Signal Battalion; concurrently, the 416th Signal Company (see ANNEX 1) and the 221st Signal Company (see ANNEX 2)

reorganized and redesignated, respectively, as Company A and Company B, 327th Signal Battalion

- Constituted 29 August 1940 in the Regular Army as the 316th Signal Aviation Company
- Activated 20 September 1940 at Mitchel Field, New York
- Redesignated 5 March 1941 as the 316th Signal Company, Air Wing
- Redesignated 24 October 1941 as the 416th Signal Company, Aviation
- Inactivated 16 October 1945 in Italy
- Redesignated 15 December 1954 as the 416th Signal Aviation Company
- Activated 7 February 1955 at Fort Huachuca, Arizona
- Reorganized and redesignated 26 May 1961 as the 416th Signal Company
- Inactivated 2 February 1963 at Fort Huachuca, Arizona
- Activated 18 August 1965 at Fort Lee, Virginia
- Constituted 3 November 1941 in the Regular Army as the 221st Signal Depot Company
- Activated 14 August 1943 at Fort Monmouth, New Jersey
- Inactivated 20 June 1948 in Germany
- Redesignated 8 January 1952 as the 221st Signal Base Depot Company
- Activated 22 January 1952 at Atlanta, Georgia
- Reorganized and redesignated 4 October 1954 as the 221st Signal Company
- Inactivated 1 September 1965 at Sacramento, California
- Activated 1 June 1966 at Fort Monmouth, New Jersey
- Inactivated 1 July 1974 at Schofield Barracks, Hawaii
- Activated 16 September 1979 at Fort Bragg, North Carolina
- Inactivated April 2007 at Fort Bragg, North Carolina
