= Royal Bengal Airline =

Bangladeshi airline

IATA	ICAO	Call sign
4A	RRY	ROYAL BENGAL
- Founded: 30 May 2006; United Kingdom
- Commenced operations: 31 January 2008
- Ceased operations: 2009
- Hubs: Dhaka
- Fleet size: 1
- Destinations: 4
- Parent company: Aviana Airways Ltd
- Headquarters: London, United Kingdom

Aviana Airways Ltd operating as Royal Bengal Airline was a short-lived airline that operated domestic flights in Bangladesh. The carrier, headquartered in London, was wholly owned by R B Airline UK Ltd.

== History ==
Royal Bengal Airlines was founded by members of Britain's Bangladeshi businessmen in June 2006 and officially launched to the public in November 2006. It was the first airline to be owned and run by British-born Bangladeshis from the Sylhet region of Bangladesh and planned to operate long haul routes between the United Kingdom and Bangladesh with stopovers in the Middle East. The airline was founded on the basis of providing direct flights to Osmani International Airport in Sylhet from the United Kingdom. However, the Civil Aviation Authority of Bangladesh did not confirm that Royal Bengal Airlines or any other airline was given access to this route.

By June 2007, the airline had raised GBP£5.5 million of investment from local businesses and stock brokers and had purchased two Dash 8-100 aircraft. Domestic services were expected to commence during summer 2007 with international flights from the UK expected by the end of 2007 from London Stansted, Manchester and Birmingham airports.

The airline officially launched commercial operations on 31 January 2008, however it shut down the year after.

== Destinations ==
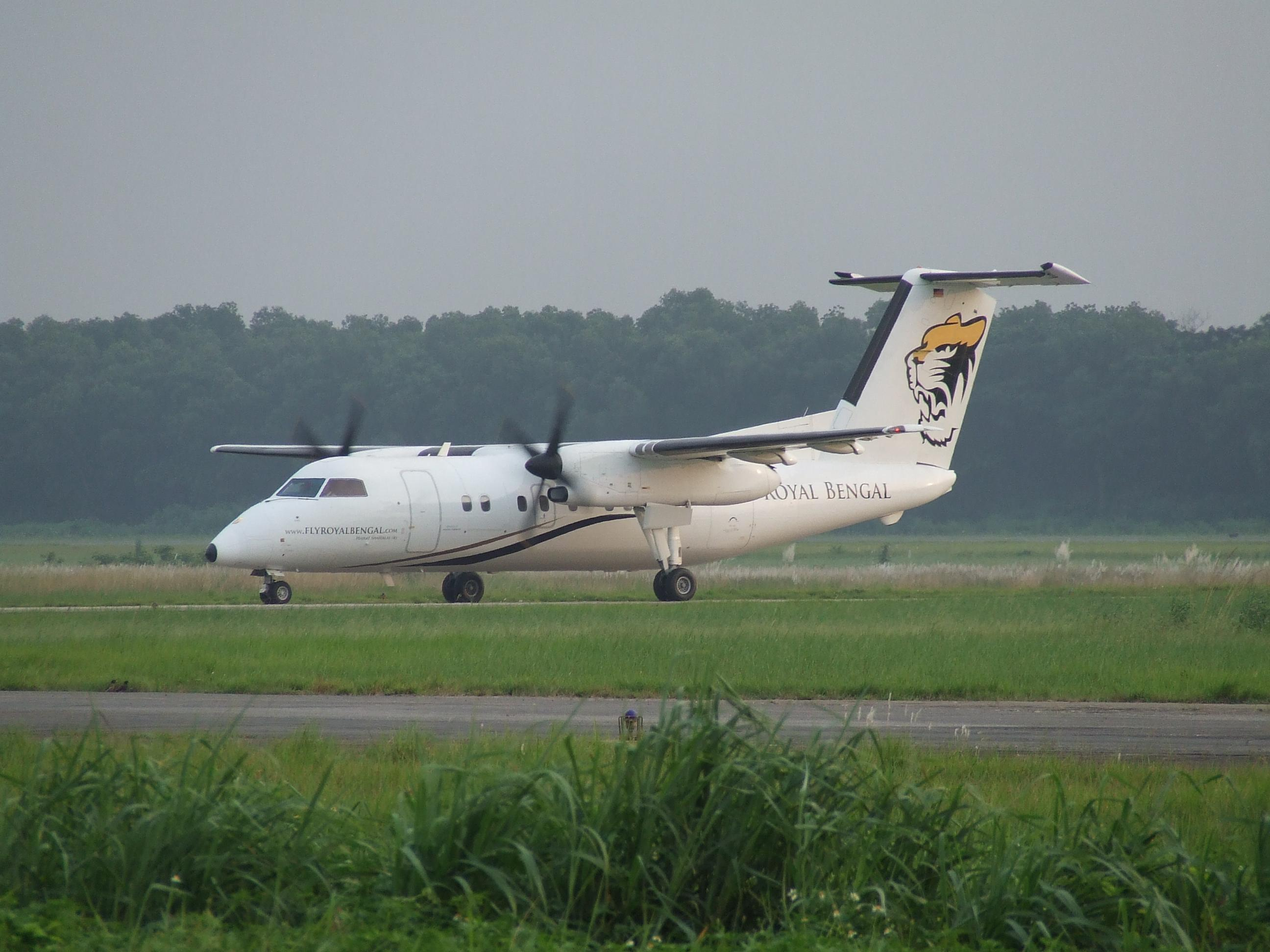
Royal Bengal Airline Bombardier Dash 8-100

Royal Bengal Airline initially operated three domestic scheduled services a day, between Dhaka and Chittagong and between Dhaka and Sylhet. By September 2009, the service between Dhaka and Cox's Bazar had been added.

== Fleet ==
Royal Bengal Airline operated the following aircraft:

- 1 Bombardier Dash 8-100

== See also ==
- List of defunct airlines of Bangladesh
