= Hathazari Airfield =

Airfield in Bangladesh

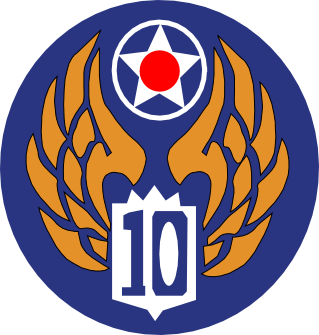
Hathazari Airfield
- Part of Tenth Air Force
- Hathazari, Bangladesh

Site information
- Type: Military airfield
- Controlled by: United States Army Air Forces

Location
- Location within Bangladesh
- Coordinates: 22°30′36″N 091°47′25″E

Site history
- Built: 1944
- In use: 1944–1945
- Battles/wars: Burma Campaign 1944–1945

Hathazari Airfield is a former wartime United States Army Air Forces airfield in Bangladesh that was used during the Burma Campaign in 1945. It is no longer in use.

== History ==
The airfield was located near the railhead on the main railroad line to Chittagong. It was used by the 1st Combat Cargo Group as a supply point and staging airfield for resupply airlift drops over Burma from May 1945 until June 1945. It was also used by the 128th Army Communications System Squadron as a radio relay station. Other Douglas C-47 Skytrain and Curtiss C-46 Commando-equipped transport units used the airfield until it closed in September 1945.

=== Use by the RAF ===
Between December 1944 and April 1945, the No. 117 Squadron RAF used this airfield as their base. They were joined by a detachment of the No. 62 Squadron RAF in December 1944. The No. 62 Squadron remained at the airfield until March 1945.

Between February 1945 and May 1945 the No. 31 Squadron RAF was assigned to this airfield. The No. 177 Squadron RAF was the last Royal Air Force squadron to be assigned to this airfield before it was closed.

== See also ==
- List of airports in Bangladesh
