= Tsuyung Airfield =

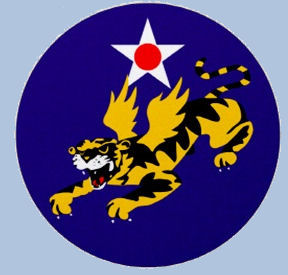
Tsuyung Airfield
- Part of Fourteenth Air Force
- Yunnan Province, China

Site information
- Type: Military airfield
- Controlled by: United States Army Air Forces

Location
- Location within China
- Coordinates: 25.038910°N 101.545917°E

Site history
- Battles/wars: China Defensive Campaign 1942-1945

Tsuyung Airfield (楚雄机场) is a former World War II United States Army Air Forces airfield from 1941 to 1945 in Chuxiong County, Yunnan Province, China. As the town urbanized, it found itself right at the town center and got demolished. Its current site became the Chuxiong Post Bureau's main building, at the junction of Lucheng East Road and Lucheng North Road. No remnants of its wartime past could be found there. There was a separate Old Tsuyung Airfield built in 1928, which was replaced by the new Tsuyung Airfield which started construction in October 1938 to deal with the increasing demand of "the Hump".

== History ==
The airfield was a major transport hub on the China end of "the Hump" air transport route over the Himalayan Mountains, from the Assam Valley in India. The base was host to both Air Transport Command units, then Fourteenth Air Force Troop Carrier squadrons which moved the equipment and supplies to forward airfields in China.
