= 912th Aeronautical Systems Group =

912th Aeronautical Systems Group

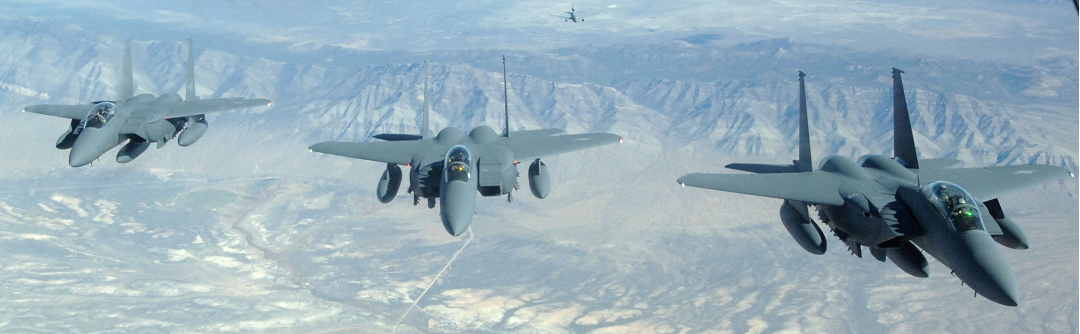
- F-15s en route to Korea in a program managed by the 912th Group
- Active: 1963-1973; 2006-2010
- Country: United States
- Branch: United States Air Force
- Role: Systems development
- Part of: Air Force Materiel Command
- Mottos: Per Mundo Cum Celere Latin, (early); Masters of the Globe
- Decorations: Air Force Outstanding Unit Award

Insignia
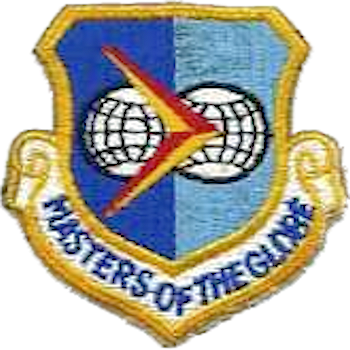
- Patch with 912th Aeronautical Systems Group emblem

The 912th Aeronautical Group is an inactive United States Air Force unit. It was last active with the 312th Aeronautical Systems Wing at Wright-Patterson Air Force Base, Ohio, where it was inactivated on 30 June 2010.

The group was first activated in the Air Force Reserve om 1963 as the 912th Troop Carrier Group. The 912th served in the reserves as an airlift unit until it was inactivated in 1973. It was activated as a systems development organization in 2006 as part of the Air Force Materiel Command Transformation.

== History ==
=== Airlift ===
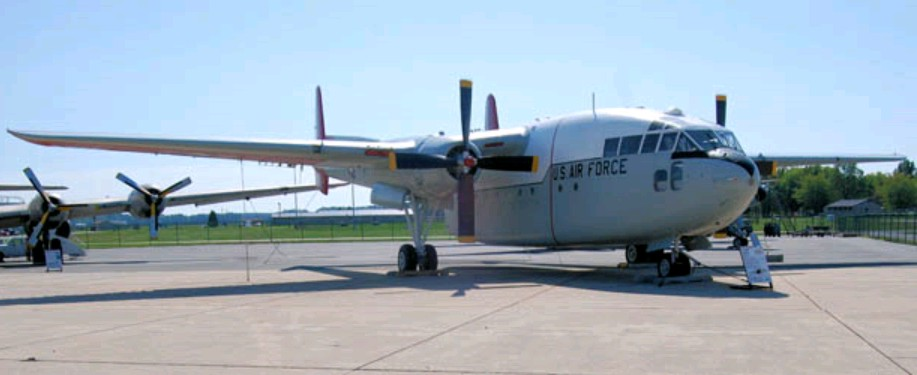
C-119 restored in colors of group's parent 512th Troop Carrier Wing

After May 1959, the reserve flying force consisted of 45 troop carrier squadrons assigned to 15 troop carrier wings. The squadrons were not all located with their parent wings, but were spread over thirty-five Air Force, Navy and civilian airfields under what was called the Detached Squadron Concept. However, under this concept, all support organizations were located with the wing headquarters. Although this was not a problem when the entire wing was called to active service, mobilizing a single flying squadron and elements to support it proved difficult, To resolve this, Continental Air Command, (ConAC) determined to reorganize its reserve wings by establishing groups with support elements for each of its troop carrier squadrons at the start of 1962. This reorganization would facilitate mobilization of elements of wings in various combinations when needed.

However, the 512th Troop Carrier Wing and its squadrons were mobilized for the Cuban Missile Crisis. The wing was released from active duty on 22 November 1962, but the mobilization delayed its reorganization until February 1963. The 912th Troop Carrier Group, flying Fairchild C-119 Flying Boxcars was activated as the command element for the 326th Troop Carrier Squadron at Willow Grove Naval Air Station, Pennsylvania, along with support elements for the 326th. The 912th Troop Carrier mission was to organize, recruit and train Air Force Reserve personnel in the tactical airlift mission with C-119s for Tactical Air Command airlift operations.

The 912th was one of three C-119 groups assigned to the 512th Wing in 1963, the others being the 913th Troop Carrier Group also at Willow Grove, and the 914th Troop Carrier Group at Niagara Falls International Airport, New York.

In January 1965 the 512th Wing was transferred without personnel or equipment to Carswell Air Force Base, Texas, and the group was reassigned to the 302d Troop Carrier Wing at Clinton County Air Force Base, Ohio, although group remained at Willow Grove. The group transferred to 514th Troop Carrier Wing at McGuire Air Force Base, New Jersey. In September 1968 the group moved from Willow Grove to Dover Air Force Base, Delaware and became a Lockheed C-141 Starlifter associate organization of the active duty 436th Military Airlift Wing as the 912th Military Airlift Group. Its crews and maintenance personnel flew and maintained the 436th's Starlifters.

The squadron was inactivated in July 1973 when the 512th Military Airlift Wing became the reserve associate unit at Dover and absorbed the mission and personnel of the 912th.

=== Aeronautical Systems ===
In 2005 Air Force Materiel Command implemented the Air Force Materiel Command Transformation reorganization, in which the command replaced its traditional program offices with wings, groups, and squadrons. The group was redesignated the 912th Aeronautical Systems Group and activated in the regular air force as part of this reorganization. It was inactivated in 2010 when Air Force Materiel Command returned to its traditional program office organization.

== Lineage ==
- Established as the 912th Troop Carrier Group, Medium and activated on 15 Jan 1963 (not organized)

Organized in the reserve on 11 February 1963
Redesignated 912th Tactical Airlift Group on 1 July 1967
Redesignated 912th Military Airlift Group (Associate) on 25 September 1968
Inactivated on 1 July 1973

- Redesignated 912th Aeronautical Systems Group

Activated on 14 July 2006
Inactivated on 30 June 2010

=== Assignments ===
- Continental Air Command, 15 January 1963 (not organized)
- 512th Troop Carrier Wing, 11 February 1963
- 302d Troop Carrier Wing, 8 January 1965
- 514th Troop Carrier Wing (later 514th Tactical Airlift Wing, Military Airlift Wing), 1 July 1966 – 1 July 1973
- 512th Aeronautical Systems Wing, 14 July 2006 – 30 June 2010

=== Components ===
- 326th Troop Carrier Squadron (later 326th Tactical Airlift Squadron, 326th Military Airlift Squadron), 11 February 1963 – 1 July 1973

=== Stations ===
- Willow Grove Naval Air Station, Pennsylvania, 11 February 1963
- Dover Air Force Base, Delaware, 25 September 1968 – 1 July 1973
- Wright-Patterson Air Force Base, Ohio, 14 July 2006 – 30 June 2010

=== Aircraft ===
- Fairchild C-119 Flying Boxcar, 1963-1968
- Lockheed C-141 Starlifter, 1968-1973
