= 512th Airlift Wing =

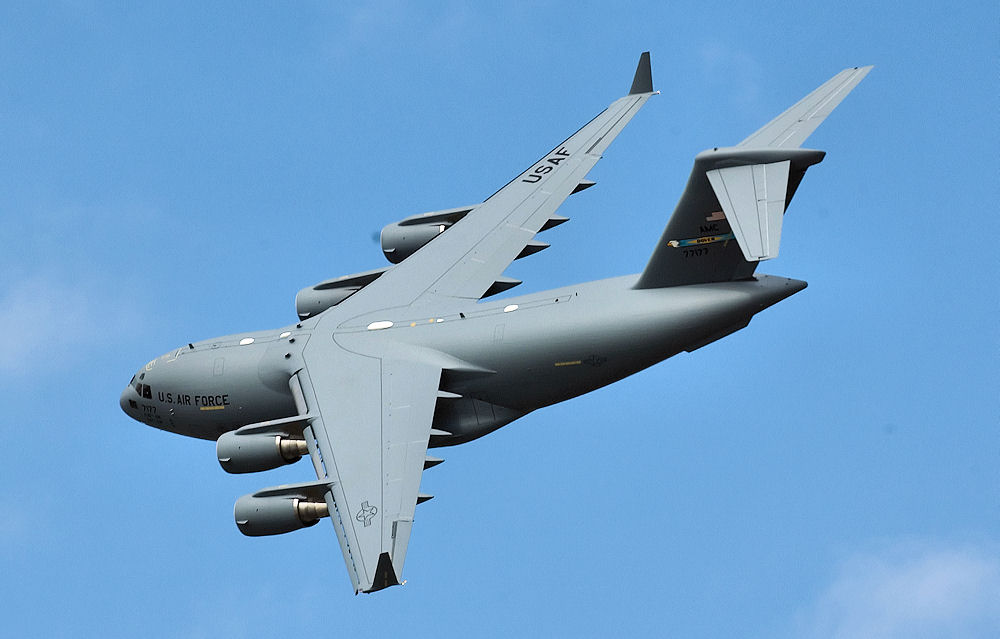
- C-17 Globemaster III of the 436th and 512th Airlift Wings
- Active: 1949–1951; 1952–1971; 1973–present
- Country: United States
- Branch: United States Air Force
- Role: Airlift
- Part of: Air Force Reserve Command
- Garrison/HQ: Dover Air Force Base
- Nickname: Liberty Wing
- Motto: Masters of the Globe (1967)
- Decorations: Air Force Outstanding Unit Award; Republic of Vietnam Gallantry Cross with Palm

Insignia
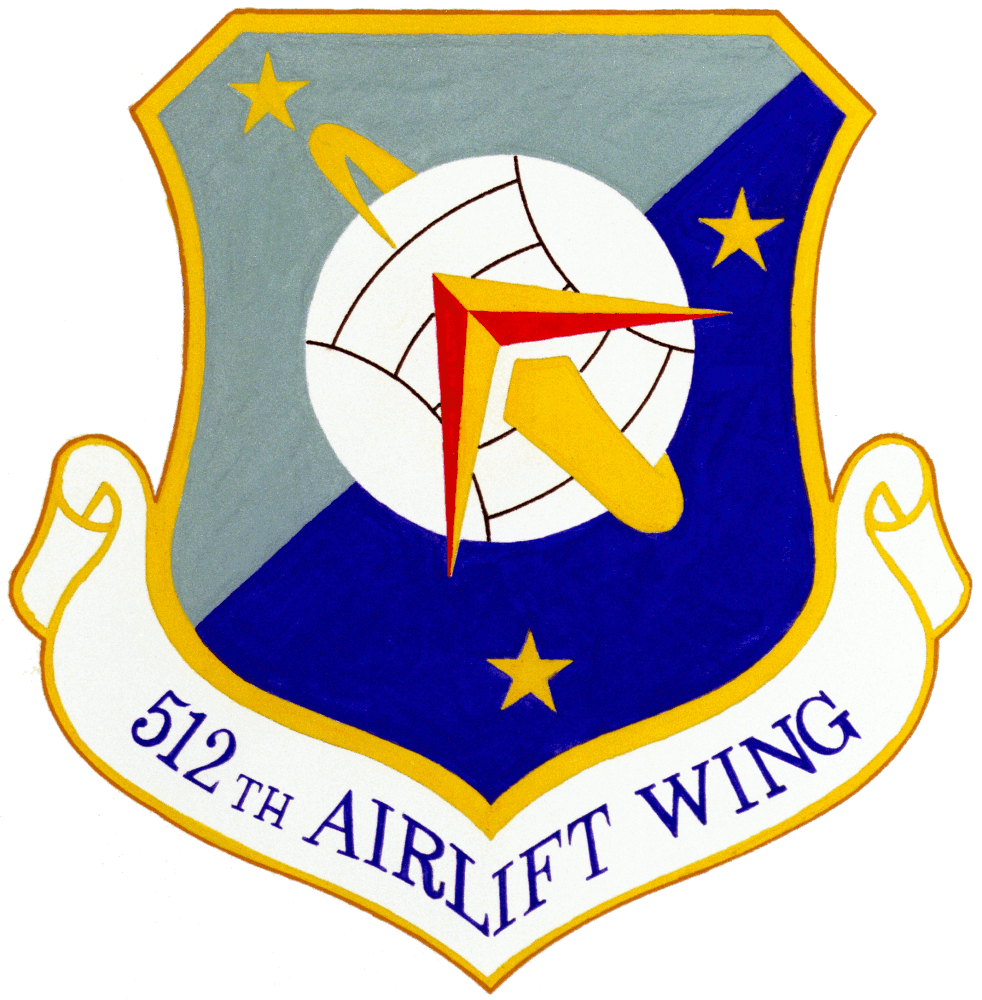
- 512th Airlift Wing emblem (Approved 21 December 1993)

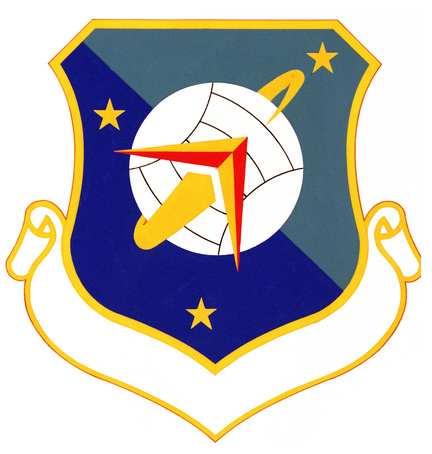
- 512th Military Airlift Wing emblem (Approved 23 July 1973)

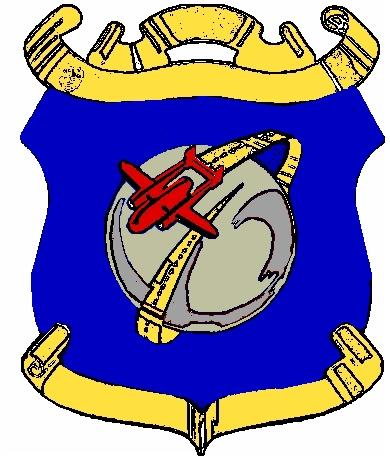
- 512th Troop Carrier Wing emblem (Approved 21 January 1957)

Aircraft flown
- Transport: C-5M Galaxy; C-17 Globemaster III

The 512th Airlift Wing, an associate Air Force Reserve Command unit is located at Dover Air Force Base, Delaware. The wing helps maintain, repair and fly the same aircraft as its active-duty counterparts. Members of the 512th work side-by-side with members of the 436th Airlift Wing in fulfilling the mission, maintaining and flying the Lockheed C-5M Galaxy and Boeing C-17 Globemaster III working together to form the "Dover Team".

The wing's mission is to recruit, train, equip and retain a qualified force to augment major commands with people and units to support long-range transport aircraft during peace and war.

As one of only two reserve associate units flying the Galaxy, the 512 AW has a unique role in the Air Force. The first C-5 all-reserve aircrew flew out of Dover in November 1973.

== Units ==
The 512th Airlift Wing consists of the following major units:

512th Operations Group

- 709th Airlift Squadron – C-5M Super Galaxy
- 326th Airlift Squadron – C-17A Globemaster III
- 512th Maintenance Group
- 512th Mission Support Group
- 512th Aerospace Medicine Squadron

== History ==
=== Activation and mobilization for the Korean War ===
The wing was first organized at Reading Municipal Airport on 2 September 1949 as the 512th Troop Carrier Wing, when it absorbed the personnel and equipment of the 319th Bombardment Wing, which was inactivated. A few months later, in April 1950, reserve operations at Reading ended when the wing transferred to New Castle County Airport, Delaware. The wing was manned at 25% of normal strength but was authorized four flying squadrons rather than the three of active duty units.

In March of the following year the wing, along with all reserve combat units, was mobilized for the first time for the Korean War. Its personnel were assigned to other units as fillers, as were its aircraft, and the wing was inactivated two weeks later.

=== Troop carrier operations ===
In June 1952, the 512th Troop Carrier Wing was again activated in the reserve at New Castle County Airport, replacing the 916th Reserve Training Wing and taking over the 916th's personnel. The reserve mobilization for the Korean War, however, had left the Reserve without aircraft, and the unit did not receive aircraft until July 1952. 512th aircrews flew Curtiss C-46 Commandos throughout the periods of reserve and active status.

In the summer of 1956, the wing participated in Operation Sixteen Ton during its two weeks of active duty training. Sixteen Ton was performed entirely by reserve troop carrier units and moved United States Coast Guard equipment From Floyd Bennett Naval Air Station to Isla Grande Airport in Puerto Rico and San Salvador in the Bahamas. After the success of this operation, the squadron/group/wing began to use inactive duty training periods for Operation Swift Lift, transporting high priority cargo for the air force and Operation Ready Swap, transporting aircraft engines, between Air Materiel Command's depots.

Cuts in the budget in 1957 led to a reduction in the number of reserve squadrons from 55 to 45. In November, the wing's 328th Troop Carrier Squadron moved on paper to Paine Air Force Base, Washington, where it assumed the facilities that the 65th Troop Carrier Squadron had vacated there. The 328th Squadron's stay on the West Coast was brief, for it replaced the 64th Troop Carrier Squadron at Niagara Falls Municipal Airport the following March. The moves of the 328th Squadron were not only due to budget cuts, they were part of a reserve program called the Detached Squadron Concept. The Air Force believed that the location of separate squadrons in smaller population centers would facilitate recruiting and manning. In time, the detached squadron program proved successful in attracting additional participants

Also in 1957, the wing converted to Fairchild C-119 Flying Boxcars. After that transition, the wing transferred to Willow Grove Air Reserve Station, Pennsylvania in July 1958. In April 1959, the 512th Troop Carrier Group inactivated as the wing reorganized under the Dual Deputy system, and the wing's three troop carrier squadrons were reassigned directly to the wing.

=== Activation of groups under the wing ===
Although the dispersal of flying units was not a problem when the entire wing was called to active service, mobilizing a single flying squadron and elements to support it proved difficult. This weakness was demonstrated in the partial mobilization of reserve units during the Berlin Crisis of 1961. To resolve this, at the start of 1962, Continental Air Command determined to reorganize its reserve wings by establishing groups with support elements for each of its troop carrier squadrons. This reorganization would facilitate mobilization of elements of wings in various combinations when needed. However, as this plan was entering its implementation phase, another partial mobilization, which included the 512th Wing, occurred for the Cuban Missile Crisis, with the units being released on 22 November 1962. The formation of troop carrier groups was delayed until February 1963 for wings that had been mobilized. 912th and 913th Troop Carrier Groups at Willow Grove and the 914th Troop Carrier Group at Niagara Falls were assigned to the wing on 11 February.

The 512th Troop Carrier Wing, Medium was redesignated the 512th Troop Carrier Wing, Heavy in January 1965. That same month the wing was transferred without personnel or equipment to Carswell Air Force Base, Texas. Aircrews conducted training and airlift operations in Douglas C-124 Globemaster IIs. While stationed at Carswell, two more name changes occurred: 1 December 1965, the Wing was redesignated the 512th Air Transport Wing, Heavy and on 1 January 1966, was redesignated the 512th Military Airlift Wing. On 29 June 1971, the Wing was inactivated for a second time.

On 29 January 1973 the wing was redesignated the 512th Military Airlift Wing (Associate) and activated in the Reserve on 1 July 1973 at Dover Air Force Base, Delaware flying the Lockheed C-5A Galaxy aircraft. Upon activation at Dover, the 512th absorbed the personnel of the 912th Military Airlift Group (Associate) stationed at Dover. The 912th Military Airlift Group (Associate) previously assigned to the 514th Military Airlift Wing, McGuire Air Force Base, New Jersey, for administrative support, but stationed at Willow Grove moved from Willow Grove to Dover in September 1968. Equipped with Lockheed C-141 Starlifter aircraft, the 912th became the third associate group in the Air Force Reserve to fly the C-141. The wing was redesignated the 512th Airlift Wing on 1 October 1994.

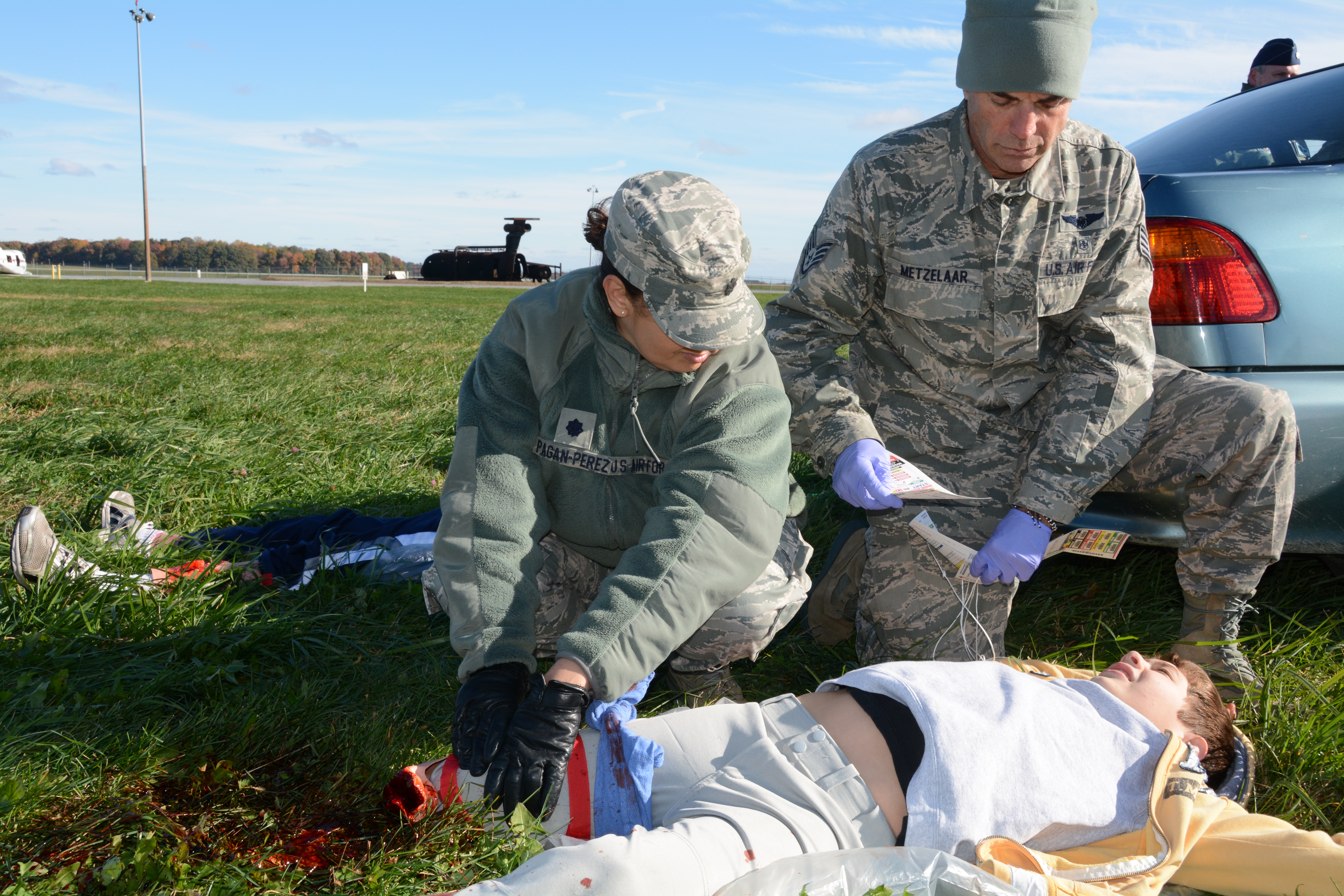
512th Aerospace Medicine Squadron, simulate first response treatment of a Delaware Civil Air Patrol cadet during a training exercise 2 November 2014, at Dover Air Force Base.

Many missions have been flown by the citizen airman of the 512th Airlift Wing. Over 1,300 members of the 512th were recalled to active duty during Operations Desert Shield/Desert Storm. Fliers, Maintenance Specialists, Aerial Porters, Medical Personnel, and Security Police were deployed around the world as well as stateside for more than a year. In 2007, the wing began a new era in airlift when the 326th Airlift Squadron began flying the McDonnell Douglas C-17 Globemaster III aircraft when it received their first C-17 on 31 May 2007.

On 26 April 2015, the wing and its associated 436th Airlift Wing dispatched the first USAF aircraft, a C-17, carrying cargo and personnel for humanitarian aid following the earthquake in Nepal. The plane carried a United States Agency for International Development Disaster Assistance Response Team, the Fairfax County, Virginia Urban Search and Rescue Team and 45 tons of cargo.

== Lineage ==
- Established as the 512th Troop Carrier Wing, Medium on 4 August 1949

Activated in the reserve on 2 September 1949
Ordered to active service on 15 March 1951
Inactivated on 1 April 1951
Activated in the reserve on 14 June 1952
Ordered to active service on 28 October 1962
Relieved from active duty on 28 November 1962
Redesignated 512th Troop Carrier Wing, Heavy on 8 January 1965
Redesignated 512th Air Transport Wing, Heavy on 1 December 1965
Redesignated 512th Military Airlift Wing on 1 January 1966
Inactivated on 29 June 1971

- Redesignated 512th Military Airlift Wing (Associate) on 29 January 1973

Activated in the Reserve on 1 July 1973
Redesignated 512th Airlift Wing (Associate) on 1 February 1992
Redesignated 512th Airlift Wing on 1 October 1994

=== Assignments ===
- Ninth Air Force, 2 September 1949
- First Air Force, 1 August 1950 – 1 April 1951
- 1 Air Reserve District, 14 June 1952
- First Air Force, 14 January 1954
- Fourteenth Air Force, 25 March 1958
- Second Air Force Reserve Region, 15 August 1960
- Ninth Air Force, 28 October 1962
- Second Air Force Reserve Region, 28 November 1962
- Fourth Air Force Reserve Region, 8 January 1965
- Central Air Force Reserve Region, 31 December 1969 – 29 June 1971
- Eastern Air Force Reserve Region, 1 July 1973
- Fourteenth Air Force, 8 October 1976
- Twenty-Second Air Force, 1 July 1993 – present

=== Components ===
==== Groups ====
- 512th Troop Carrier Group (later 512 Operations Group): 2 September 1949 – 1 April 1951; 14 June 1952 – 14 April 1959; 1 August 1992 – present
- 912th Troop Carrier Group: 11 February 1963 – 8 January 1965
- 913th Troop Carrier Group: 11 February 1963 – 8 January 1965
- 914th Troop Carrier Group: 11 February 1963 – 1 January 1964
- 916th Military Airlift Group: 8 January 1965 – 21 April 1971 (detached after 1 April 1971)
- 917th Military Airlift Group: 5 February 1965 – 21 April 1971 (detached after 1 April 1971)
- 937th Military Airlift Group: 5 February 1965 – 21 April 1971 (detached after 1 April 1971)

==== Squadrons ====
- 326th Military Airlift Squadron: 14 April 1959 – 11 February 1963; 1 July 1973 – 1 August 1992
- 327th Troop Carrier Squadron: 14 April 1959 – 11 February 1963
- 328th Troop Carrier Squadron: 14 April 1959 – 11 February 1963
- 709th Military Airlift Squadron: 1 October 1973 – 1 August 1992

=== Stations ===
- Reading Municipal Airport, Pennsylvania, 2 September 1949
- New Castle County Airport, Delaware, 12 April 1950 – 1 April 1951
- New Castle County Airport, Delaware, 14 June 1952
- Naval Air Station Willow Grove, Pennsylvania, 20 July 1958
- Carswell Air Force Base, Texas, 8 January 1965 – 29 June 1971
- Dover Air Force Base, Delaware, 1 July 1973 – present

=== Aircraft ===
- Beechcraft AT-7, AT-11, and Curtiss C-46 Commando, 1949–1951
- Curtiss C-46 Commando, 1952–1957
- Fairchild C-119 Flying Boxcar, 1957–1965
- Douglas C-124 Globemaster II, 1965–1971
- Lockheed C-141 Starlifter, 1973
- Lockheed C-5 Galaxy, 1973 – present
- McDonnell Douglas C-17 Globemaster III, 2007–present
