= 913th Airlift Group =

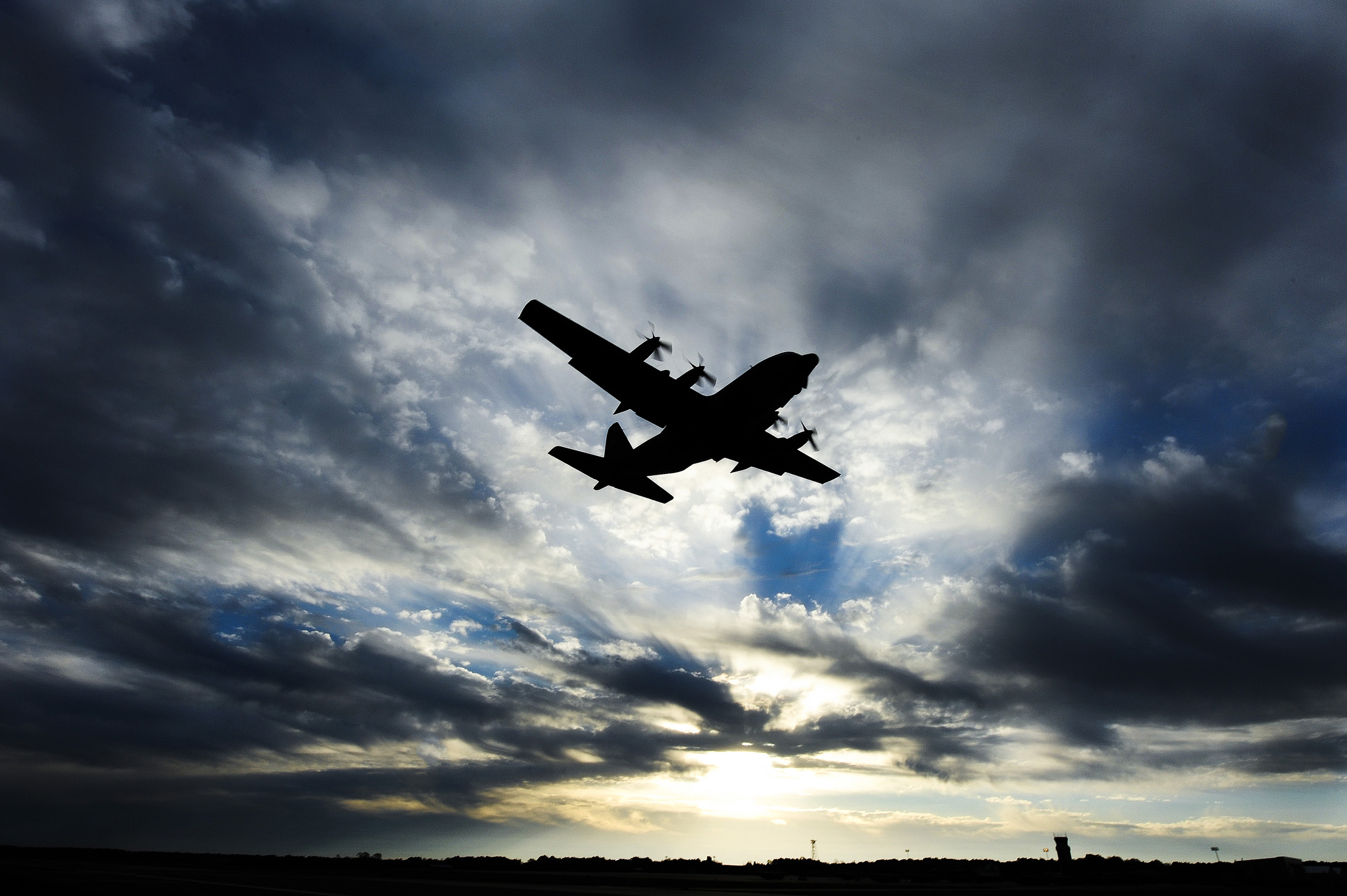
- A USAF C-130 Hercules takes off from Little Rock Air Force Base
- Active: 1963–2007; 2014–present
- Country: United States
- Branch: United States Air Force
- Role: Airlift
- Size: 850 personnel
- Part of: Air Force Reserve Command
- Garrison/HQ: Little Rock Air Force Base, Arkansas
- Motto: Omnes Prosperant Latin Everyone Prospers
- Decorations: Air Force Outstanding Unit Award Republic of Vietnam Gallantry Cross with Palm

Insignia
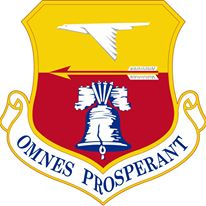
- 913th Airlift Group emblem

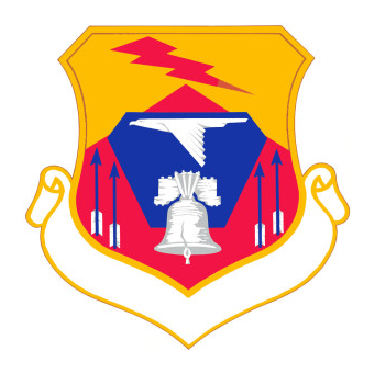
- 913th Tactical Airlift Group emblem (approved 2 January 1970)

The 913th Airlift Group is a United States Air Force Reserve unit. It is assigned to 22d Air Force and is stationed at Little Rock Air Force Base, Arkansas. It was activated 13 July 2014.

== Mission ==
The 913th Airlift Group trains and equips Air Force Reservists to perform the combat missions of tactical airlift and aerial resupply.

Subordinate organizations of the 913th AG are:

- 327th Airlift Squadron
- 913th Operations Support Squadron
- 913th Maintenance Squadron
- 913th Force Support Squadron
- 913th Aerospace Medical Squadron
- 96th Aerial Port Squadron

== History ==
=== Need for reserve troop carrier groups ===
During the first half of 1955, the Air Force began detaching Air Force Reserve squadrons from their parent wing locations to separate sites. The concept offered several advantages. Communities were more likely to accept the smaller squadrons than the large wings and the location of separate squadrons in smaller population centers would facilitate recruiting and manning. Continental Air Command (ConAC)'s plan called for placing Air Force Reserve units at fifty-nine installations located throughout the United States. When these relocations were completed in 1959, reserve wing headquarters and wing support elements would typically be on one base, along with one (or in some cases two) of the wing's flying squadrons, while the remaining flying squadrons were spread over thirty-five Air Force, Navy and civilian airfields under what was called the Detached Squadron Concept.

Although this dispersal was not a problem when the entire wing was called to active service, mobilizing a single flying squadron and elements to support it proved difficult. This weakness was demonstrated in the partial mobilization of reserve units during the Berlin Crisis of 1961 To resolve this, at the start of 1962, ConAC determined to reorganize its reserve wings by establishing groups with support elements for each of its troop carrier squadrons. This reorganization would facilitate mobilization of elements of wings in various combinations when needed. However, as this plan was entering its implementation phase, another partial mobilization occurred for the Cuban Missile Crisis, with the units being released on 22 November 1962. The formation of troop carrier groups occurred in January 1963 for units that had not been mobilized, but was delayed until February for those that had been.

=== Activation of 913th Troop Carrier Group ===
As a result, the 913th Troop Carrier Group was established at Willow Grove Naval Air Station, Pennsylvania on 11 February 1963, as the headquarters for the 327th Troop Carrier Squadron, which had been stationed there since July 1958. Along with group headquarters, a Combat Support Squadron, Materiel Squadron and a Tactical Infirmary were organized to support the 327th.

The group's mission was to organize, recruit and train Air Force Reserve personnel in the tactical airlift of airborne forces, their equipment and supplies and delivery of these forces and materials by airdrop, landing or cargo extraction systems. The group was equipped with Fairchild C-119 Flying Boxcars for Tactical Air Command airlift operations.

The 913th was one of three C-119 groups assigned to the 512th Troop Carrier Wing in 1963, the others being the 912th Troop Carrier Group also at Willow Grove, and the 914th Troop Carrier Group at Niagara Falls International Airport, New York.

=== Redesignation as 913th Tactical Airlift Group ===
The 913th was redesignated as the 913th Tactical Airlift Group (913 TAG) and performed air transportation for airborne forces, airdrops, airlandings, and extraction delivery of equipment and supplies, as well as airlift of personnel and cargo. During the Vietnam War the group also helped train Republic of Vietnam Air Force C-119 aircrews in 1967 and ferried aircraft to Southeast Asia in March 1968 and to Taiwan in January 1969.

In 1970, the 913th transitioned from the C-119 to the Lockheed C-130 Hercules. Beginning in 1977 the 913th participated in rotational "Coronet Oak" operations in the Panama Canal Zone flying airlift in support of U.S. Southern Command (USSOUTHCOM) at Howard AFB. In addition, it has performed humanitarian airlift and supported contingency operations worldwide, including operations in Southwest Asia and the Balkans.

=== Redesignation as 913th Airlift Group and 913th Airlift Wing ===
With the disestablishment of the 913th's active duty gaining command, the Military Airlift Command (MAC) in 1992, the 913th was redesignated as 913th Airlift Group (913 AG), with the Air Mobility Command (AMC). From 1993 to 1997, the 913th's gaining command was temporarily changed to Air Combat Command (ACC), until a USAF reorganization returned the unit back to AMC. In 1994, the 913 AG was redesignated as the 913th Airlift Wing (913 AW) as part of an Air Force-wide initiative to redesignate all Air Force Reserve and Air National Guard flying units with unit-assigned aircraft as wings.

The 913 AW was inactivated on 1 October 2007 under budget considerations. Reference The 913th AW was inactivated under an Air Force Reserve Command 2007 Programmatic Budget Directive action, with its Lockheed C-130H Hercules aircraft redistributed to other active duty Air Force and Air Force Reserve airlift units.

=== Associate unit ===
The unit was reactivated as the 913th Airlift Group at Little Rock Air Force Base, Arkansas and an activation ceremony was held on 13 July 2014. The group replaced Detachment 1, Twenty-Second Air Force, which had been established at Little Rock in March 2011. The 913th Airlift Group is the first C-130 classic associate unit in the U.S. Air Force. Upon activation, it was associated with the 314th Airlift Wing of the Air Education and Training Command (AETC) and the 189th Airlift Wing (180 AW) of the Arkansas Air National Guard in performing the crew training mission for the C-130. In October 2013, however, its predecessor had already begun transitioning to the combat airlift mission in association with the 19th Airlift Wing (19 AW) of the Air Mobility Command (AMC). The 913th currently flies active duty Lockheed C-130J Hercules assigned to the 19th Operations Group, 19th Airlift Wing, at Little Rock AFB, Arkansas to accomplish all operational and training missions.

Late February 2018, the unit returned home from a six-month Operation Enduring Freedom deployment to Kabul, Afghanistan.

== Lineage ==
- Constituted as the 913th Troop Carrier Group, Medium and activated on 15 January 1963 (not organized)

Organized in the reserve on 11 February 1963
Redesignated 913th Tactical Airlift Group on 1 July 1967
Redesignated 913th Airlift Group on 1 February 1992
Redesignated 913th Airlift Wing on 1 October 1994
Inactivated on 1 October 2007

- Redesignated 913th Airlift Group

Activated c. 13 July 2014

=== Assignments ===
- Continental Air Command, 15 January 1963 (not organized)
- 512th Troop Carrier Wing, 11 February 1963
- 302d Troop Carrier Wing, 8 January 1965
- 514th Troop Carrier Wing, (later 514th Tactical Airlift Wing, 514th Military Airlift Wing), 1 July 1966 (attached to 302d Special Operations Wing after 1 July 1970)
- 302d Special Operations Wing, 16 September 1970 (attached to 403d Composite Wing after 1 April 1971)
- 403d Composite Wing (later 403d Tactical Airlift Wing), 21 April 1971
- 459th Tactical Airlift Wing (later 459th Airlift Wing), 8 January 1976
- 403d Airlift Wing (later 403d Wing), 1 August 1992
- Tenth Air Force, 1 October 1994
- Twenty-Second Air Force, 1 April 1997 – 1 October 2007
- Twenty-Second Air Force, c. 13 July 2014 – present

=== Components ===
Groups

- 913th Maintenance Group: 1 August 1992 – 30 September 2007
- 913th Operations Group: 1 August 1992 – 30 September 2007
- 913th Support Group (later 913th Mission Support Group): 1 August 1992 – 30 September 2007

Squadrons

- 31 Mobile Aerial Port Squadron: 1 October 1983 – 1 August 1992
- 96th Aerial Port Squadron: c. 13 July 1977 – 30 September 2007, c. 13 July 2014 – present
- 327th Tactical Airlift Squadron (later 327th Airlift Squadron): 11 February 1963 – 1 August 1992, 13 July 2014 – present
- 913th Operations Support Squadron: c. 13 July 2014 – present
- 913th Consolidated Aircraft Maintenance Squadron (later 913th Maintenance Squadron: 11 February 1963 – 1 August 1992, c. 13 July 2014 – present
- 913th Combat Support Squadron (later 913th Force Support Squadron): 11 February 1963 – 1 August 1992, ac. 13 July 2104 – present
- 913th Aerospace Medicine Squadron: c. 13 July 2014 – present
- 913th Aerial Port Flight (later 913th Mobile Aerial Port Flight): 15 February 1964 – 30 June 1971, 1 December 1972 – 1 October 1983

=== Stations ===
- Willow Grove Air Reserve Facility (later Willow Grove Air Reserve Station), Pennsylvania, 11 February 1963 – 30 September 2007
- Little Rock Air Force Base, Arkansas, 13 July 2014 – present

=== Aircraft operated ===
- Fairchild C-119 Flying Boxcar (1963–1971)
- Lockheed C-130 Hercules (1970–2007) (2014–2016)
- C-130J Super Hercules (2016–present)
