= 914th Air Refueling Wing =

914th Air Refueling Wing

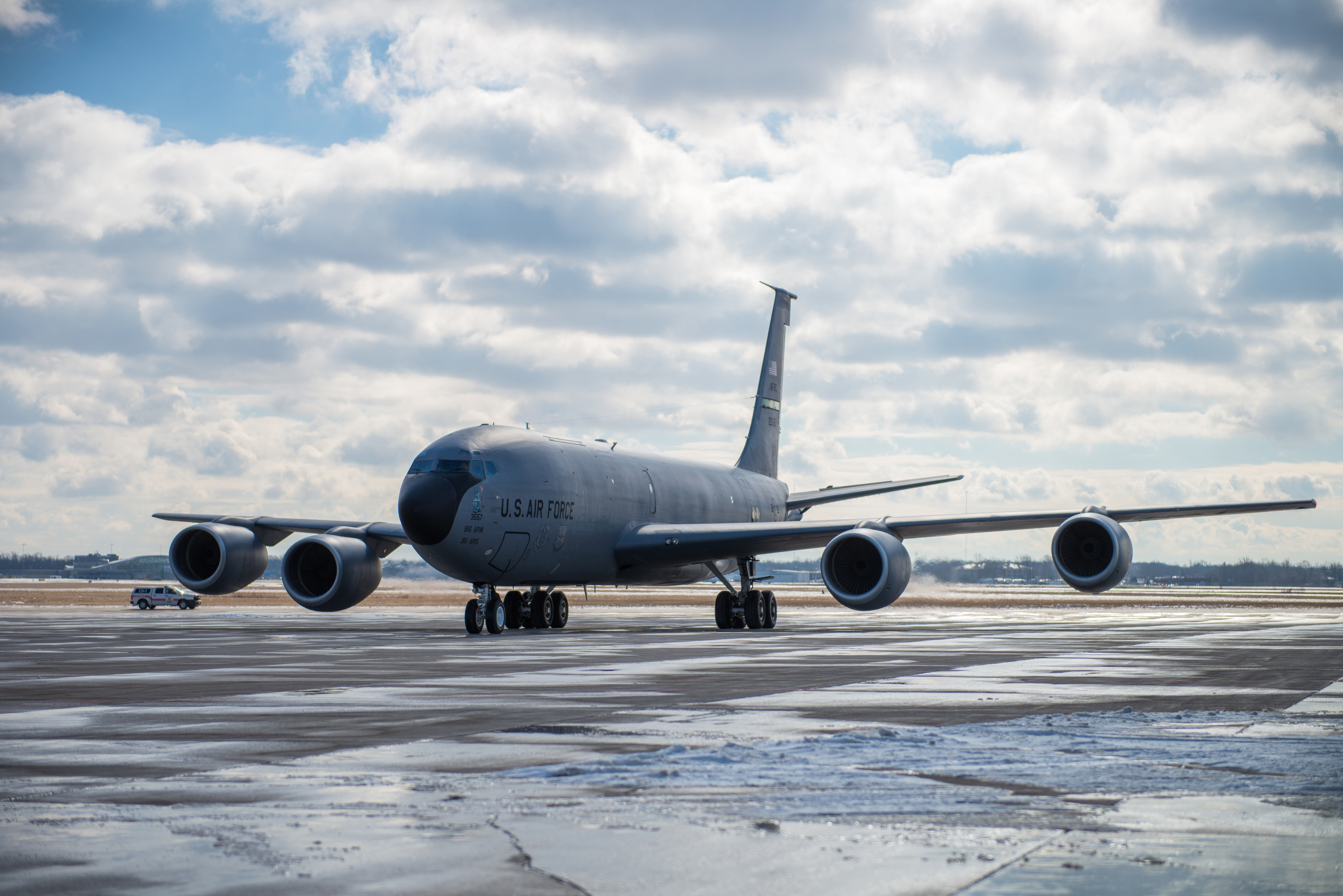
- A wing KC-135 Stratotanker arrives at Niagara Falls Air Reserve Station
- Active: 1963—present
- Country: United States
- Branch: United States Air Force
- Role: Airlift
- Part of: Air Force Reserve Command
- Garrison/HQ: Niagara Falls Air Reserve Station
- Engagements: Desert Storm
- Decorations: Air Force Outstanding Unit Award; Republic of Vietnam Gallantry Cross with Palm

Commanders
- Current commander: Colonel Joseph “20 Grit” Contino

Insignia
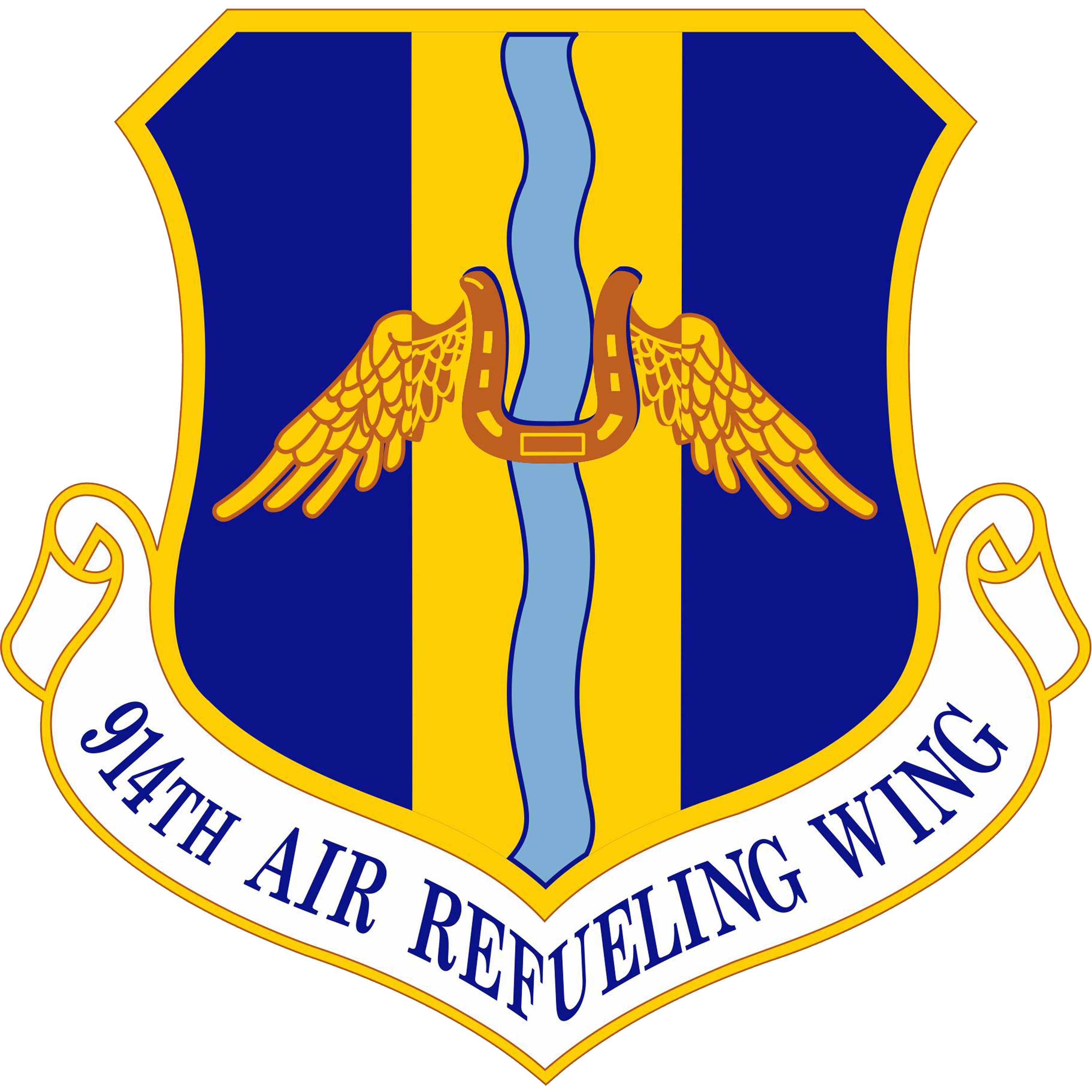
- 914th Air Refueling Wing emblem

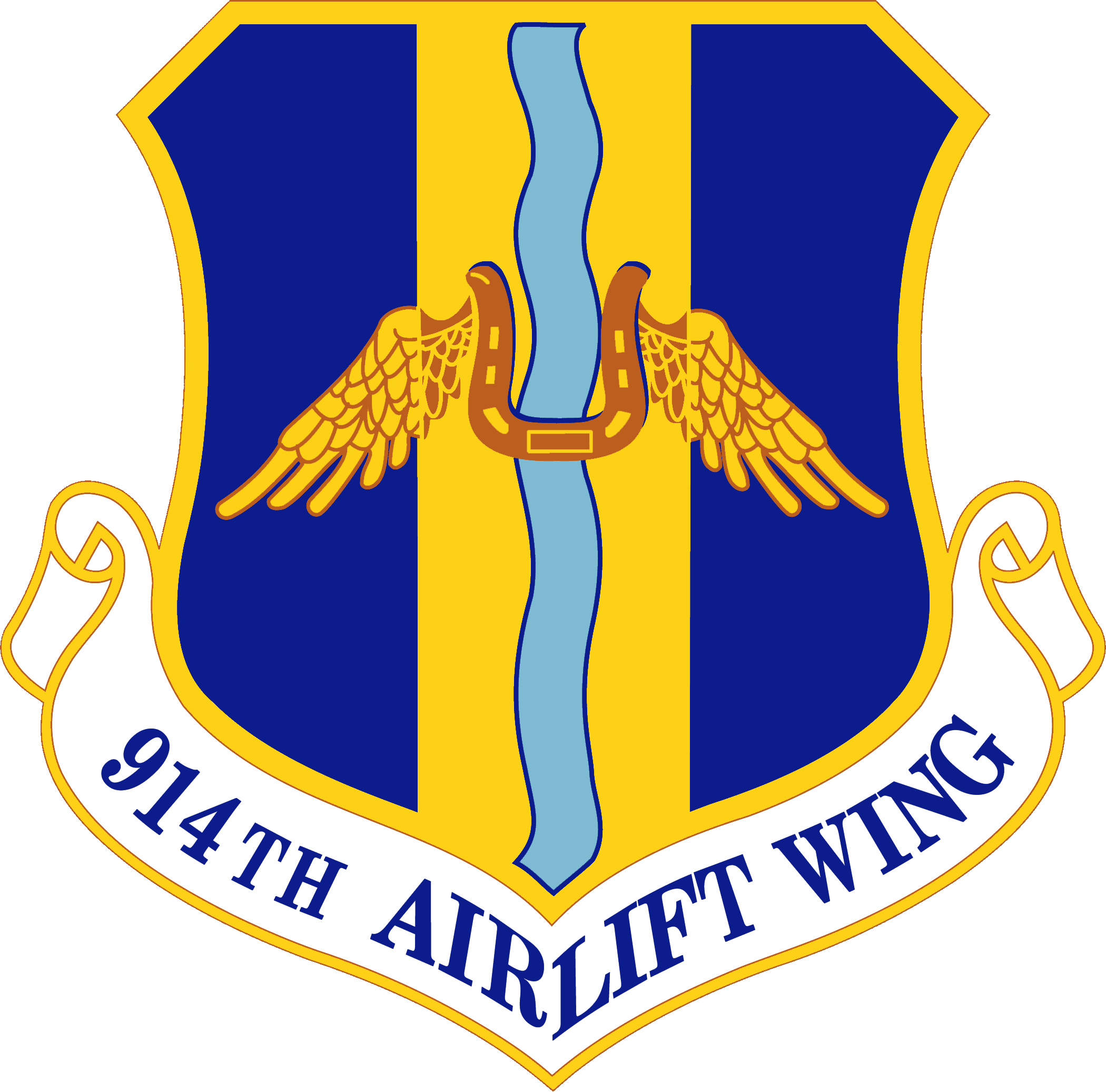
- 914th Airlift Wing emblem (Note: Approved 25 April 1996.)

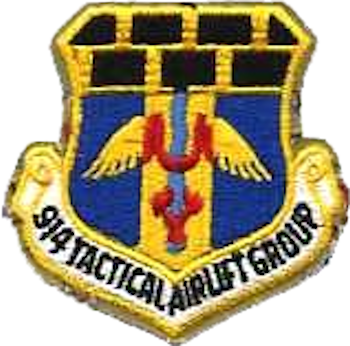
- Patch with 914th Tactical Airlift Group emblem (Note: Approved 2 November 1966.)

The 914th Air Refueling Wing is a wing of the United States Air Force based out of the Niagara Falls Air Reserve Station, New York. Assigned to Air Force Reserve Command, it is operationally-gained by Air Mobility Command.

Prior to June 2017, the unit was known as the 914th Airlift Wing, flying Lockheed C-130H Hercules airlift aircraft. After that date, it transitioned to an aerial refueling mission with the Boeing KC-135R Stratotanker and was redesignated the 914th Air Refueling Wing.

== Overview ==
The 914th Air Refueling Wing trains and equips air force reservists to perform the combat mission of air refueling of combat and mobility aircraft.

== Units ==
914th Aeromedical Staging Squadron

- 914th Operations Group

328th Air Refueling Squadron
914th Aeromedical Evacuation Squadron
914th Operations Support Squadron

- 914th Maintenance Group

914th Maintenance Squadron
914th Aircraft Maintenance Squadron
914th Maintenance Operations Flight

- 914th Mission Support Group

30th Aerial Port Squadron
914th Civil Engineering Squadron
914th Communications Squadron
914th Contracting Squadron
914th Force Support Squadron
914th Logistics Readiness Squadron
914th Security Forces Squadron

== History ==
=== Need for reserve troop carrier groups ===
During the first half of 1955, the Air Force began detaching Air Force Reserve squadrons from their parent wing locations to separate sites. The concept offered several advantages. Communities were more likely to accept the smaller squadrons than the large wings and the location of separate squadrons in smaller population centers would facilitate recruiting and manning. Continental Air Command (ConAC)'s plan called for placing Air Force Reserve units at fifty-nine installations located throughout the United States. When these relocations were completed in 1959, reserve wing headquarters and wing support elements would typically be on one base, along with one (or in some cases two) of the wing's flying squadrons, while the remaining flying squadrons were spread over thirty-five Air Force, Navy and civilian airfields under what was called the Detached Squadron Concept.

Although this dispersal was not a problem when the entire wing was called to active service, mobilizing a single flying squadron and elements to support it proved difficult. This weakness was demonstrated in the partial mobilization of reserve units during the Berlin Crisis of 1961 To resolve this, at the start of 1962, ConAC determined to reorganize its reserve wings by establishing groups with support elements for each of its troop carrier squadrons. This reorganization would facilitate mobilization of elements of wings in various combinations when needed. However, as this plan was entering its implementation phase, another partial mobilization occurred for the Cuban Missile Crisis, with the units being released on 22 November 1962. The formation of troop carrier groups occurred in January 1963 for units that had not been mobilized, but was delayed until February for those that had been.

=== Activation of 914th Troop Carrier Group ===
As a result, the 914th Troop Carrier Group was established at Naval Air Station Willow Grove, Pennsylvania on 11 February 1963, as the headquarters for the 328th Troop Carrier Squadron, which had been stationed there since March 1958. Along with group headquarters, a Combat Support Squadron, Materiel Squadron and a Tactical Infirmary were organized to support the 328th.

The group's mission was to organize, recruit and train Air Force Reserve personnel in the tactical airlift of airborne forces, their equipment and supplies and delivery of these forces and materials by airdrop, landing or cargo extraction systems. The group was equipped with Fairchild C-119 Flying Boxcars for Tactical Air Command airlift operations.

The 914th was one of three C-119 groups assigned to the 512th Troop Carrier Wing in 1963, the others being the 912th and 913th Troop Carrier Groups at Naval Air Station Willow Grove, Pennsylvania.

The group trained for and participated in air transport of airborne forces, equipment and supplies with delivery by airdrop, extraction, and airlanding, as well as air evacuation within a theater of operations.

It provided airlift to Southeast Asia during the Vietnam War and for other contingency operations, as well as numerous humanitarian missions. Beginning in 1978 the 914th supported the U.S. Southern Command by periodically fulfilling airlift requirements throughout Latin America. Between September 1990 and April 1991 the group deployed all aircraft and numerous aircrews and support personnel to Sharjah, United Arab Emirates, to provide airlift in support of the war in Southwest Asia, including a tactical resupply airdrop to troops of the XVIII Airborne Corps. A 314th crew provided the first medevac mission of the war. Other personnel deployed to Saudi Arabia and backfilled positions in the U.S. and Europe. Since the early 1990s the wing has frequently deployed personnel in support of contingency operations in Southwest Asia and the Balkans.

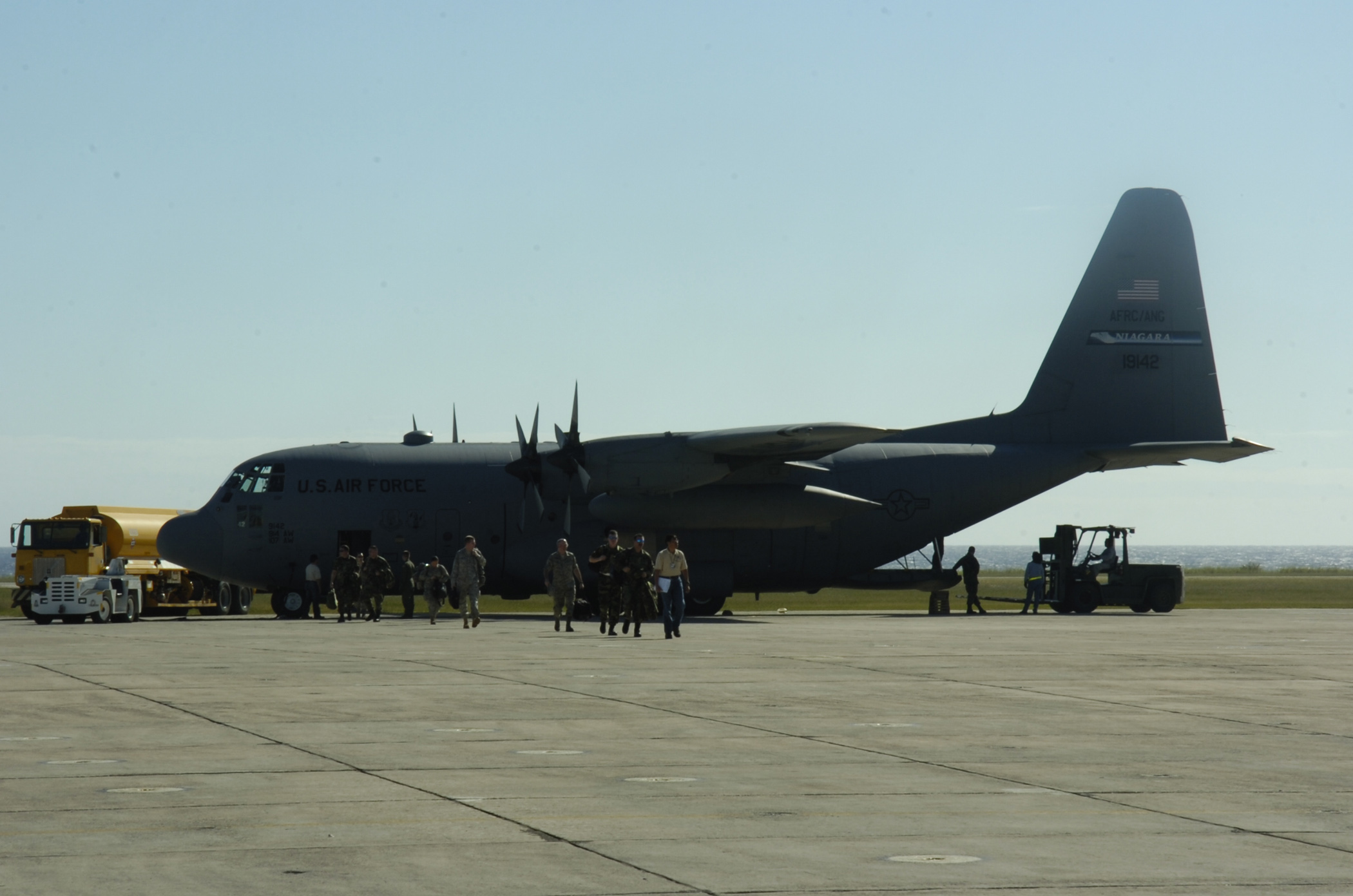
A wing C-130H Hercules at Naval Base Guantanamo Bay in 2010

Following recommendations from the Base Realignment and Closure program, the wing's Lockheed C-130 Hercules aircraft were pooled with the 107th Airlift Wing of the New York Air National Guard, also stationed at Niagara Falls. In 2014, the 107th Airlift Wing began transition to their new mission.

In 2016, the 914th was identified for a change of mission and aircraft. Later in 2016 and into 2017, the 914th initiated transition training in the KC-135R Stratotanker, with the 914th Airlift Wing and the 328th Airlift Squadron being officially redesignated the 914th Air Refueling Wing and 328th Air Refueling Squadron in June 2017.

== Lineage ==
- Established as the 914th Troop Carrier Group, Medium and activated on 15 January 1963 (not organized)

Organized in the Reserve on 11 February 1963
Redesignated 914th Tactical Airlift Group on 1 July 1967
Redesignated 914th Airlift Group on 1 February 1992
Redesignated 914th Airlift Wing on 1 October 1994
Redesignated 914th Air Refueling Wing on 1 June 2017

=== Assignments ===
- Continental Air Command, 15 January 1963
- 512th Troop Carrier Wing, 11 February 1963
- 94th Troop Carrier Wing, 1 January 1964
- 302d Troop Carrier Wing (later 302d Tactical Airlift Wing), 1 July 1966
- 440th Tactical Airlift Wing, 1 September 1969
- 403d Composite Wing (later 403d Tactical Airlift Wing), 21 April 1971
- 439th Tactical Airlift Wing (later 439th Military Airlift Wing, 439th Airlift Wing), 25 January 1976
- 94th Airlift Wing, 1 August 1992
- Tenth Air Force, 1 October 1994
- Twenty-Second Air Force, 1 April 1997 – 31 May 2017
- Fourth Air Force, 1 June 2017 – Present

=== Components ===
- 914th Operations Group: 1 August 1992 – present
- 328th Tactical Airlift Squadron: 11 February 1963 – 1 August 1992

=== Stations ===
- Niagara Falls International Airport (later Niagara Falls Air Reserve Station), New York, 11 February 1963 – present

=== Aircraft ===
- Fairchild C-119 Flying Boxcar (1963–1971)
- Lockheed C-130 Hercules (1971–2017)
- Boeing KC-135 Stratotanker (2017–present)
