= 326th Airlift Squadron =

326th Airlift Squadron

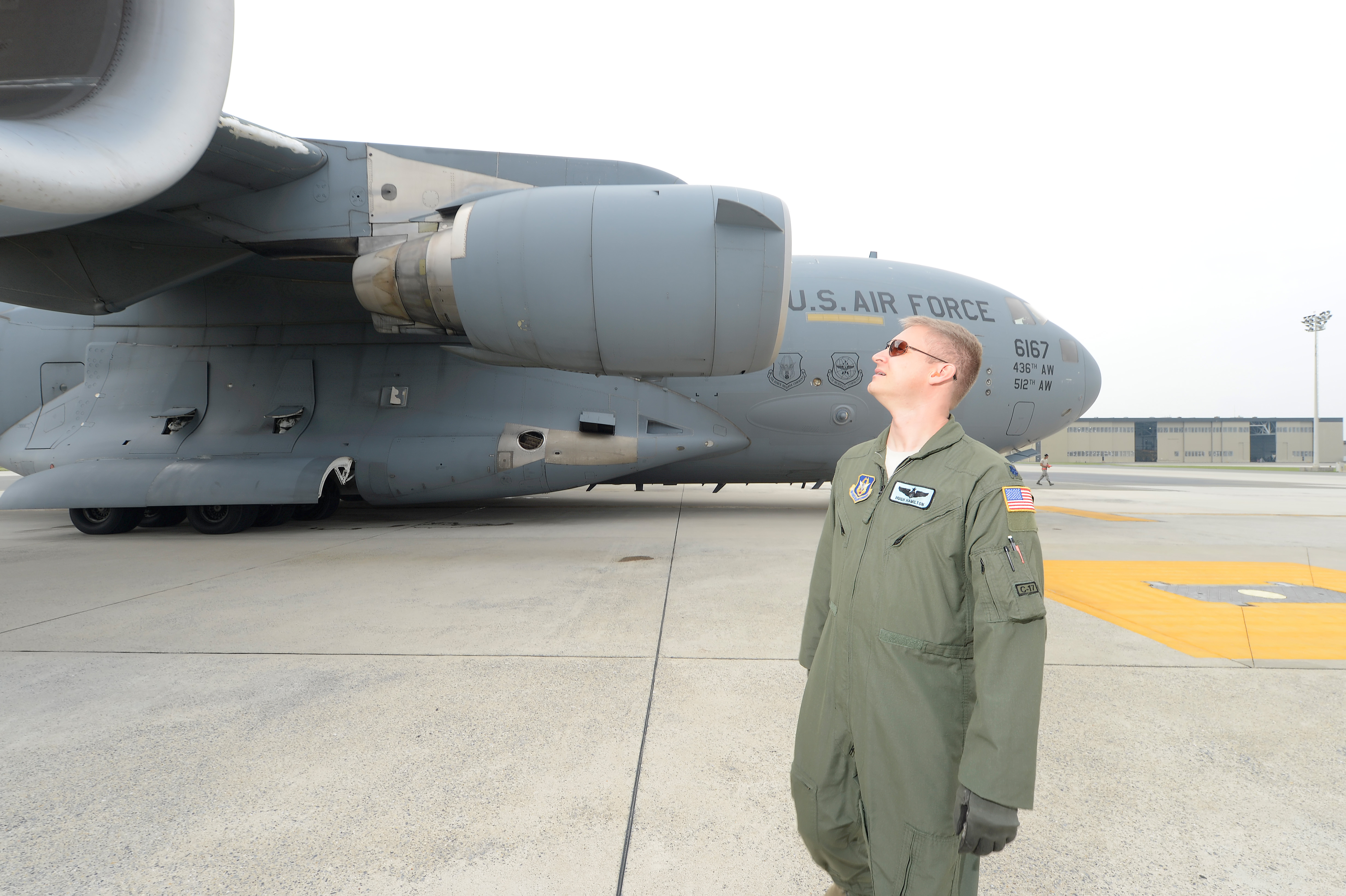
- A pilot with the 326th Airlift Squadron conducts a preflight inspection of a C-17 Globemaster III at Dover AFB
- Active: 1944–1945; 1947–1951; 1952–present
- Country: United States
- Branch: United States Air Force
- Role: Airlift
- Part of: Air Force Reserve Command
- Garrison/HQ: Dover Air Force Base
- Nickname(s): Killer Bunnies
- Decorations: Distinguished Unit Citation; Air Force Meritorious Unit Award; Air Force Outstanding Unit Award; Republic of Vietnam Gallantry Cross with Palm

Insignia
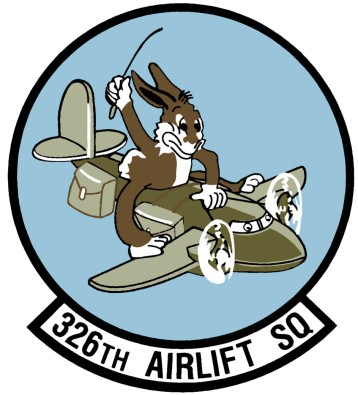
- 326th Airlift Squadron emblem (approved 17 July 1944)

The 326th Airlift Squadron is part of the 512th Airlift Wing at Dover Air Force Base, Delaware. It operates Boeing C-17 Globemaster III aircraft supporting the United States Air Force global reach mission worldwide.

The squadron was first activated in 1944 as the 1st Combat Cargo Squadron. It served in the China-Burma-India Theater, earning a Distinguished Unit Citation for its actions. After VJ Day the unit was converted to the troop carrier mission as the 326th Troop Carrier Squadron. It was inactivated in theater in December 1945.

The squadron was activated in the reserves in July 1947. In 1949 it moved to Reading Municipal Airport, Pennsylvania, where it was called to active duty for the Korean War, but inactivated after its personnel were used as fillers for other units. It was activated again in the reserve in 1952.

== Mission ==
Fly peacetime missions as a corollary of, training. Be prepared to be the initial and primary source of augmentation of the active forces in an emergency requiring expansion of the active forces.

== History ==
=== World War II ===
The 326th trained for overseas troop carrier operations from, April–August 1944. It moved to Asia, and transported troops and supplies to forward areas in China and India from, September 1944 – September 1945.

=== Air Force reserve ===
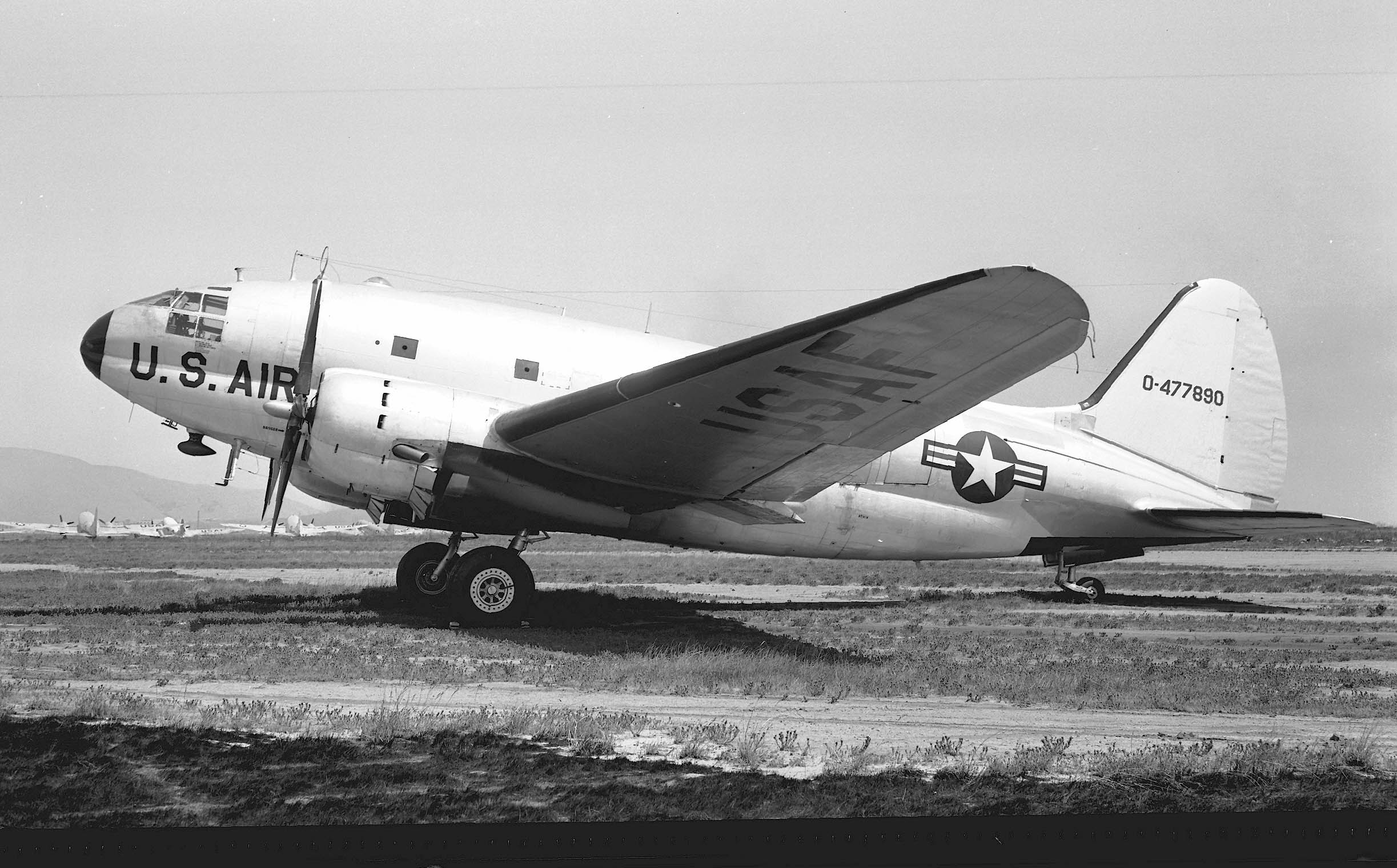
Curtiss C-46D

The squadron was once again activated as a reserve unit under Air Defense Command at Morrison Field, Florida on 15 July 1947. The squadron was nominally a Curtiss C-46 Commando unit, but it is not clear to what extent it was equipped with tactical aircraft while at Morrison.

In June 1949, Continental Air Command, which had assumed the responsibility for training reserve units from Air Defense Command in 1948, reorganized its reserve units under the wing base organization system. As part of this reorganization and unit reductions required by President Truman’s reduced 1949 defense budget, the 435th Group moved to Miami International Airport, where it was assigned to the newly formed 435th Troop Carrier Wing. Reserve flying operations at Morrison came to an end, with the exception of the 326th Squadron, which remained there until September, when it moved to Pennsylvania and was assigned to the 512th Troop Carrier Group. The squadron was manned at 25% of normal strength. The squadron was called to active service for the Korean War in March 1951, but its personnel were used as fillers for other organizations and it was inactivated two weeks later. The unit's aircraft were distributed to other organizations as well.

The squadron resumed training in the reserve for airlift missions in 1952. It has since taken part in various contingency and humanitarian airlift operations worldwide. Beginning in 1992, took part in various contingency and humanitarian airlift operations worldwide; flew global and training missions; provided presidential support. Supported Operations Allied Force and Southern Watch, 1998–1999; Global War on Terrorism after 11 September 2001.

== Lineage ==
- Constituted as the 1st Combat Cargo Squadron on 11 April 1944

Activated on 15 April 1944
Redesignated 326th Troop Carrier Squadron on 29 September 1945
Inactivated on 26 December 1945

- Activated in the reserve on 15 July 1947

Redesignated 326th Troop Carrier Squadron, Medium on 2 September 1949
Ordered into active service on 15 March 1951
Inactivated on 1 April 1951

- Activated in the reserve on 14 June 1952

Ordered into active service on 28 October 1962
Relieved from active service on 28 November 1962
Redesignated 326th Tactical Airlift Squadron on 1 July 1967
Redesignated 326th Military Airlift Squadron (Associate) on 25 September 1968
Redesignated 326th Airlift Squadron (Associate) on 1 February 1992
Redesignated 326th Airlift Squadron on 1 October 1994

=== Assignments ===
- 1st Combat Cargo Group, 15 April 1944
- Fourteenth Air Force, 16 June – 26 December 1945 (attached to 69th Composite Wing, 16 August – 10 November 1945)
- 435th Troop Carrier Group, 15 July 1947
- 512th Troop Carrier Group, 2 September 1949 – 1 April 1951
- 512th Troop Carrier Group, 14 June 1952
- 512th Troop Carrier Wing, 14 April 1959
- 912th Troop Carrier Group (later 912 Tactical Airlift Group 912 Military Airlift Group), 11 February 1963
- 512th Military Airlift Wing (later 512 Airlift Wing), 1 July 1973
- 512th Operations Group, 1 August 1992 – present

=== Stations ===
- Bowman Field, Kentucky, 15 April – 1 August 1944
- Sylhet Airfield, India, 21 August 1944

Detachments operated from Yunnani Airfield, China, 15 September – 2 October 1944, Hathazari Airfield, India, 19 October – c. December 1944

- Tulihal Airfield, India, 29 November 1944
- Tsuyung Airfield, China, 12 December 1944
- Hsinching Airfield, China, 29 January 1945

Detachment operated from Liangshan Airfield, China, 11 Mar-9 July 1945

- Chengkung Airfield, China, 16 August 1945
- Piardoba Airfield, India, 15 November – 26 December 1945
- Morrison Field, Florida, 15 July 1947
- Reading Municipal Airport, Pennsylvania, 2 September 1949
- New Castle County Airport, Delaware, 1 May 1950 – 1 April 1951
- New Castle County Airport, Delaware, 14 June 1952
- Willow Grove Naval Air Station (later US Naval Air Station Willow Grove), Pennsylvania, 20 July 1958
- Dover Air Force Base, Delaware, 25 September 1968 – present

=== Aircraft ===
- Douglas C-47 Skytrain (1944–1945)
- Curtiss C-46 Commando (1949–1951, 1952–1957)
- Beechcraft AT-7 Navigator (1949–1951)
- Beechcraft AT-11 Kansan (1949–1951)
- Fairchild C-119 Flying Boxcar (1957–1968)
- Lockheed C-141 Starlifter (1968–1973)
- Lockheed C-5 Galaxy (1973–2007)
- McDonnell Douglas C-17 Globemaster III (2007–present)
