= Dover Air Force Base =

US Air Force base near Dover, Delaware

- Dover, Delaware, U.S. in United States
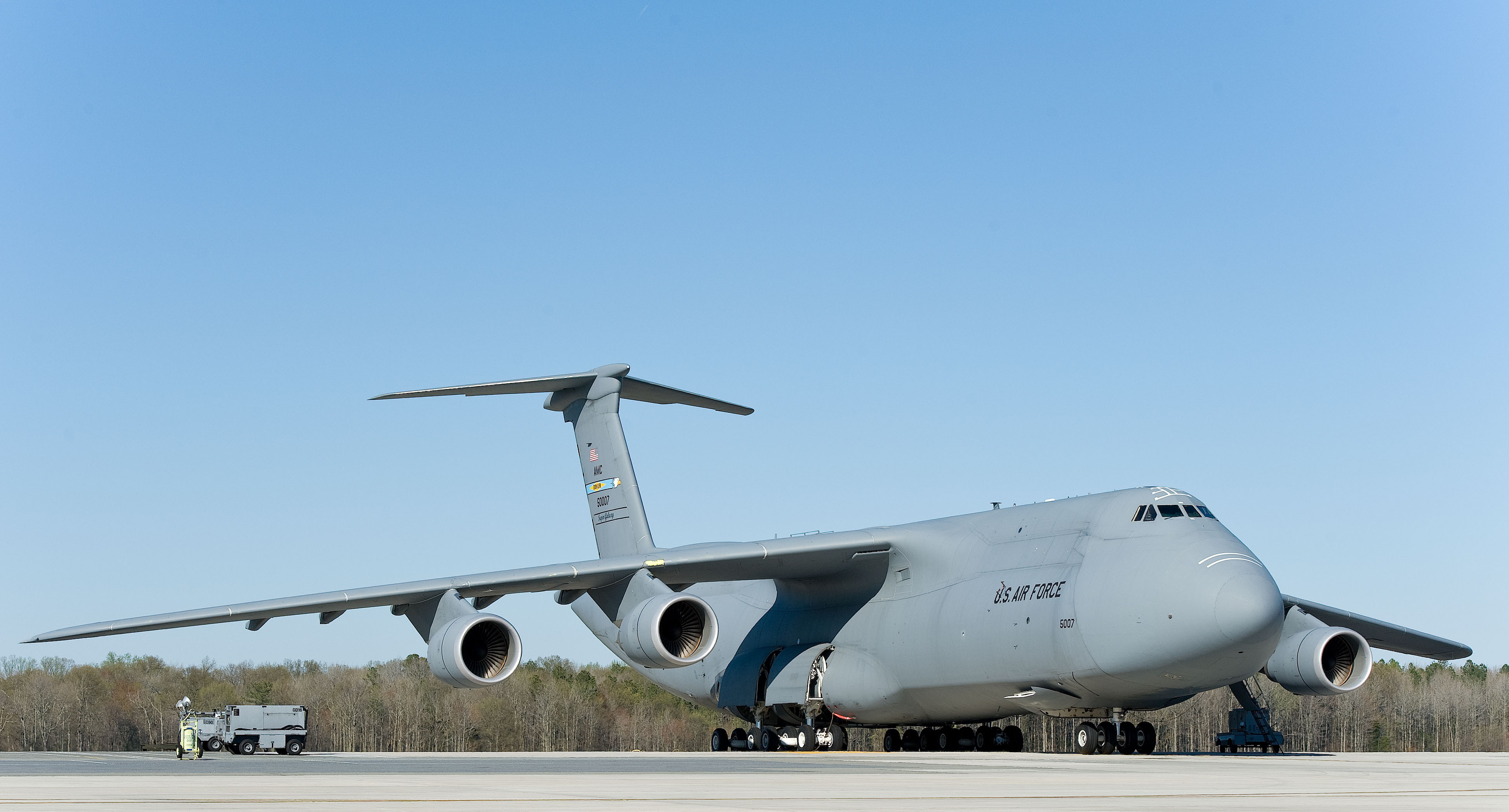
- A C-5M Super Galaxy at Dover Air Force Base in April 2014

Site information
- Type: U.S. Air Force base
- Owner: Department of Defense
- Operator: US Air Force
- Controlled by: Air Mobility Command (AMC)
- Condition: Operational
- Website: Official website

Location
- Location of Dover Air Force Base in Delaware Location of Dover Air Force Base within the United States
- Coordinates: 39°07′42″N 075°27′53″W

Site history
- Built: 1941
- In use: 1941 – present

Garrison information
- Current commander: Colonel Jamil I. Musa
- Garrison: 436th Airlift Wing (Host); 512th Airlift Wing
- Occupants: 3rd Airlift Squadron; 9th Airlift Squadron; 326th Airlift Squadron; 709th Airlift Squadron; See Based units section for full list.
- Designations: National Register of Historic Places (Building 1301)

Airfield information
- Identifiers: IATA: DOV, ICAO: KDOV, FAA LID: DOV, WMO: 724088
- Elevation: 8.8 metres (29 ft) AMSL
Runways
Direction	Length and surface
14/32	3,932.8 metres (12,903 ft) Asphalt/Concrete
01/19	2,926.6 metres (9,602 ft) Asphalt

Dover Air Force Base or Dover AFB (IATA: DOV, ICAO: KDOV, FAA LID: DOV) is a United States Air Force (USAF) base under the operational control of Air Mobility Command (AMC), located 2 mi (3.2 km) southeast of the city of Dover, Delaware. The 436th Airlift Wing (436th AW) serves as the host wing and operates a major Department of Defense air freight terminal. The AMC-gained 512th Airlift Wing (512th AW) of the Air Force Reserve Command is co-located at the base. Together the two wings fly a fleet of C-5M Super Galaxy and C-17 Globemaster III aircraft.

Construction began in March 1941 and the facility opened on December 17, 1941, ten days after the attack on Pearl Harbor; it was converted to military use within weeks. It was redesignated Dover Air Force Base on January 13, 1948. Under the Military Air Transport Service and its successor Military Airlift Command, Dover transitioned to an all-C-5 Galaxy fleet by 1973, the first such wing in the USAF. The base transferred to the newly established Air Mobility Command in 1992.

Dover AFB is home to the Charles C. Carson Center for Mortuary Affairs, the largest military mortuary in the Department of Defense. The remains of service members killed overseas are traditionally returned to Dover before transfer to their families. The center has also identified remains in major disasters: victims of the Jonestown mass death in 1978, the crew of Space Shuttle Challenger in 1986, and the crew of Space Shuttle Columbia in 2003. The base contributes approximately $470 million annually to the regional economy and is the third-largest industry in Delaware. The Air Mobility Command Museum, housed in the historic Hangar 1301—a National Register of Historic Places listing—is open to the public.

== History ==
Construction of Municipal Airport, Dover Airdrome began in March 1941 and the facility was opened on December 17, 1941. It was converted to a U.S. Army Air Corps airfield just weeks after the December 7, 1941 attack on Pearl Harbor. It was renamed Dover Army Air Base on April 8, 1943; Dover Subbase (Note: Was a subbase of Camp Springs AAF, Maryland, June 6, 1943–April 15, 1944.) on June 6, 1943, and Dover Army Airfield on February 2, 1944. With the establishment of the United States Air Force (USAF) on September 18, 1947, the facility was renamed Dover Air Force Base on January 13, 1948.

=== World War II ===
In March 1941, Dover Air Force Base was founded during World War II to meet the needs of the United States Army Air Corps (USAAC) for an airfield that could be used as a training center. USAAC obtained jurisdiction over the municipal airport at Dover, Delaware.

Once the airport came under military control, an immediate construction program began to turn the civil airport into a military facility. Construction involved runways and airplane hangars, with three concrete runways, several taxiways, a large parking apron and a control tower. Several large hangars were also constructed. Buildings were ultimately utilitarian and quickly assembled. Most base buildings, not intended for long-term use, were constructed with temporary or semi-permanent materials. Although some hangars had steel frames, and the occasional brick or tile brick building could be seen, most support buildings sat on concrete foundations, but were of frame construction, and clad in little more than plywood and tarpaper. Initially under USAAC, the name of the facility was Municipal Airport, Dover Airdrome. The airfield was assigned to the First Air Force.

On December 20 the first military unit arrived at Dover's new airfield: the 112th Observation Squadron of the Ohio National Guard which flew anti-submarine patrols off the Delaware Coast. In early 1942, three B-25 Mitchell bomber squadrons arrived with the 45th Bombardment Group from I Bomber Command, later part of Army Air Forces Antisubmarine Command, assumed the anti-submarine mission.

On April 8, 1943, the name of the airfield was changed to Dover Army Air Base. The antisubmarine mission ended on June 6, and construction crews moved back to the base for a major upgrading project that lengthened the main runway to 7,000 feet. During the construction period and continuing into June 1944, Dover AAB became a sub-base of Camp Springs Army Airfield, Maryland.

Full operational capability was restored to Dover in September, and seven P-47 Thunderbolt squadrons arrived for training in preparation for eventual involvement in the European Theater, while the 83d Fighter Group was assigned to Dover as the Operational Training Unit, The 83rd was redesignated the 125th Base Unit on April 10, 1944, with very little change in its mission. It was further redesignated as the 125th Army Air Force base Unit on September 15, 1944.

In 1944, the Air Technical Service Command chose Dover as a site to engineer, develop, and conduct classified air-launched rocket tests. The information collected during these experiments resulted in the effective deployment of air-to-surface rockets in both the European and Pacific combat theaters.

On September 1, 1946, as a result of the drawdown of United States forces after the war, Dover Army Airfield was placed on temporary inactive status. A small housekeeping unit, the 4404th Base Standby Squadron, remained on the airfield for care and maintenance of the facility.

=== Cold War and Vietnam ===
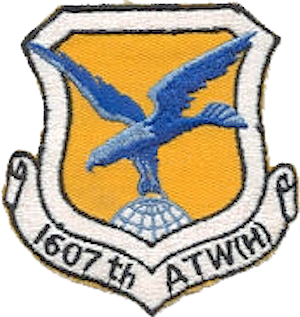
MATS 1607th ATW emblem

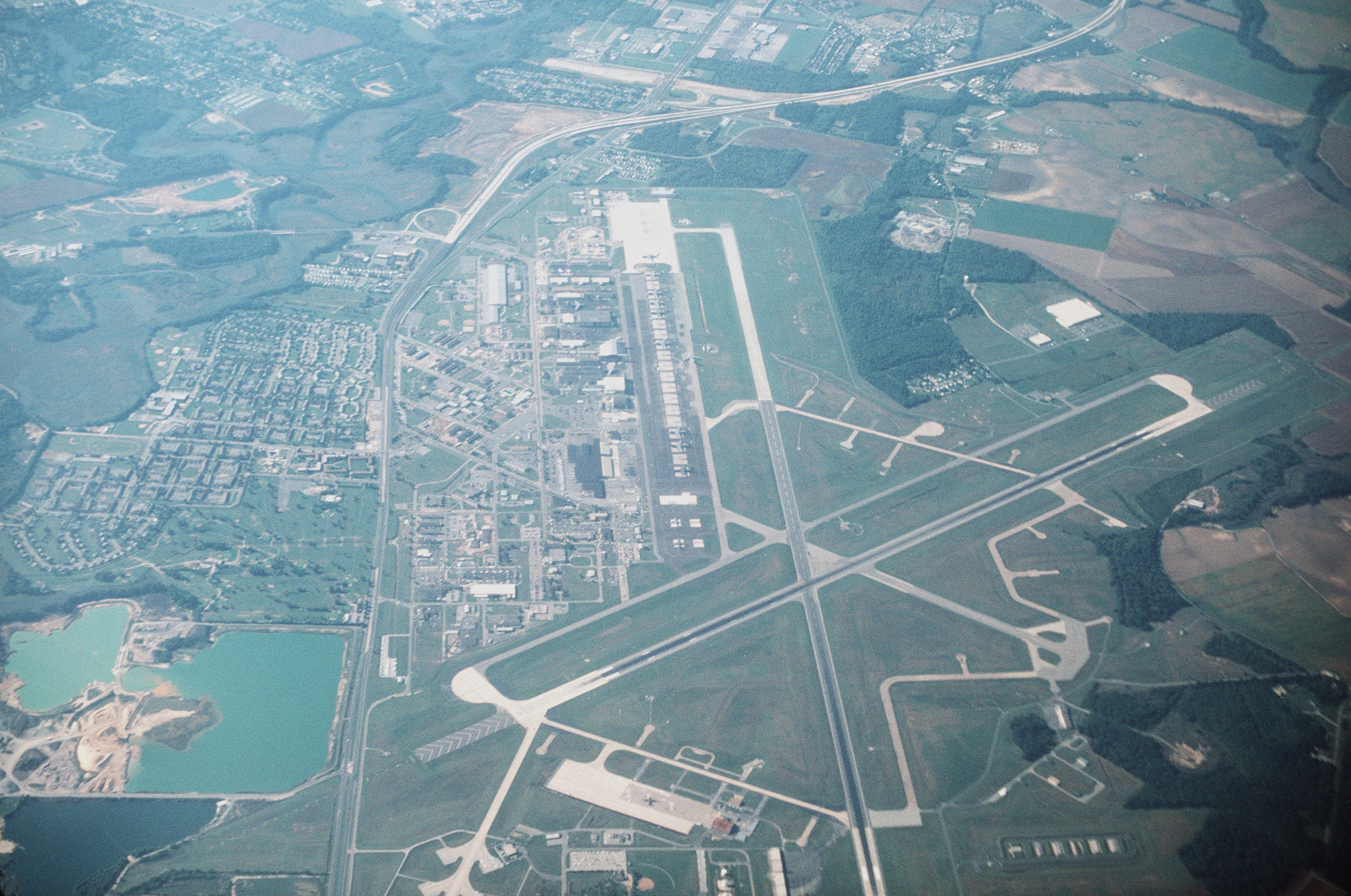
An aerial view of Dover Air Force Base in 1995

Dover Airfield was reactivated on August 1, 1950 as a result of the Korean War and the expansion of the USAF in response to the Soviet threat in the Cold War. On February 1, 1951, the 148th Fighter Interceptor Squadron of the Pennsylvania Air National Guard arrived with P-51 Mustang fighter aircraft. During the 1950s problems developed with many of the facilities in Dover, which had been hastily constructed to support its World War II mission. As a result, a massive engineering project was undertaken to modernize the base.

On April 1, 1952, Dover was transferred to the Military Air Transport Service (MATS) and became home to 1607th Air Transport Wing (Heavy). A full function hospital was completed in 1958 and base housing was expanded to handle 1,200 families in 1961. On January 1, 1966, the Military Air Transport Service was redesignated the Military Airlift Command (MAC). Along with the reorganization, the 1607th was discontinued and the 436th Military Airlift Wing (436th MAW) activated and assumed the mission at Dover. The 436th MAW started replacing C-141 Starlifters and C-133 Cargomasters with the new C-5 Galaxy in 1971. Two years later Dover became the first all C-5 equipped wing in the USAF, trading the last of its C-141 to Charleston AFB, South Carolina.

During the Vietnam War, the bodies of more than 20,000 American soldiers were brought back to the United States via Dover. The Vietnam War dead account for over 90% of all the remains processed at Dover before 1988.

When the Yom Kippur War broke out between Israel and the combined forces of Egypt and Syria on October 13, 1973, the 436th MAW responded with a 32-day airlift that delivered 22,305 tons of munitions and military equipment to Israel. The 436th MAW also assisted in the evacuation of Americans from Iran on December 9, 1978, following the Islamic Revolution. That year, Dover AFB was also used to store hundreds of bodies from the mass murder and suicide of the Jonestown community in Guyana.

Some of the more memorable flights during the post-war period included the airdrop and test firing of a Minuteman I intercontinental ballistic missile and the delivery of a 40-ton superconducting magnet to Moscow during the Cold War, for which the crew received the Mackay Trophy.

After the Space Shuttle Challenger disaster, the remains of the seven astronauts were transferred to Dover AFB. It is one of only seven airports in the country that served as launch abort facilities for the Space Shuttle.

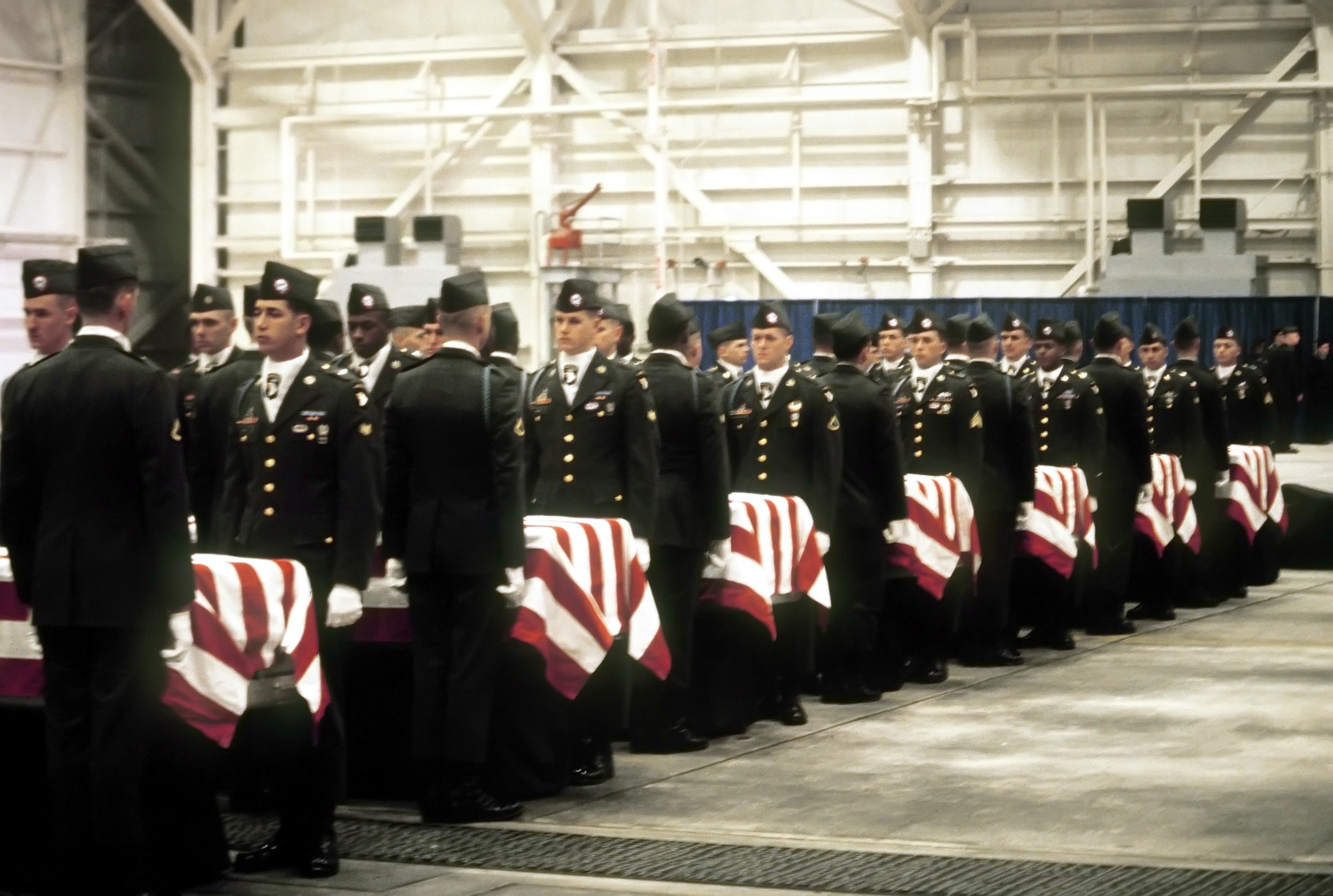
101st Airborne Division Honor Guard at Dover AFB during memorial services for victims of Arrow Air Flight 1285, December 1985

In March 1989, C-5s from Dover delivered special equipment used to clean up the Exxon Valdez oil spill in Prince William Sound, Alaska. On June 7, 1989, while attending the Airlift Rodeo, a 436th MAW C-5 set a world record when it airdropped 190,346 pounds and 73 paratroopers. In October 1983, the wing flew 24 missions in support of Operation Urgent Fury, the Grenada rescue operation and later flew 16 missions to support Operation Just Cause, the invasion of Panama, in December 1989 – January 1990.

During Operation Desert Shield, the wing flew approximately 17,000 flying hours and airlifted a total of 131,275 tons of cargo in support of combat operations after the Iraqi invasion of Kuwait.

In 1992, with the disestablishment of Military Airlift Command, Dover AFB was transferred to the newly established Air Mobility Command (AMC) and the 436th MAW and 512th MAW (Associate) were redesignated as the 436th Airlift Wing (436th AW) and the 512th Airlift Wing (512th AW), respectively. Dover also served as a major port of entry and exit for the conflicts in the Balkans and Somalia during the latter half of the 1990s.

=== September 11 attacks ===
Following the September 11 attacks, the 436th AW and 512th AW became major participants in Operation Enduring Freedom and Operation Iraqi Freedom. An aircrew from Dover's 3rd Airlift Squadron landed the first C-5 in Iraq in late 2003 when they landed at Baghdad International Airport and the two wings continue to support operations in the region.

Also following September 11, 2001, U.S. Army mortuary specialists organized support for Pentagon recovery efforts out of the base. This effort evolved into the Joint Personal Effects Depot, which supports recovery and redistribution of the personal effects of wounded and killed personnel from all arms of the military. In 2003, the Depot was transferred to Aberdeen Proving Ground in Maryland. Dover AFB is also where service members from all six branches of service killed in combat are repatriated. Their remains are processed, inspected for unexploded ordnance, cleaned, and prepared for burial before being escorted to the point of interment decided by the family. The Depot returned to Dover in 2011, when in April a new $14 million custom-built facility officially opened.

By 2008, the air traffic tower serving the airfield, built in 1955, was the oldest such tower in use in the USAF. In 2009 the base received a new 128-foot tall tower, overlapping the original 103-foot one which was donated to the Air Mobility Command Museum, accessible to visitors.

Dover AFB is the first air force base to receive the new C-5M "Super Galaxy", receiving the aircraft on February 9, 2009 (named "The Spirit of Global Reach").

On February 2, 2015, the 9,600 foot runway 01-19 was closed for repairs. The runway was re-opened for operation on September 23, 2016. During the repair, the 12,900 foot runway 14–32 was temporarily cut in half so that the intersection of the two runways could be repaired. C-17 Globemasters could land on either half of runway 14–32.

=== Major assigned commands ===
Command	Assumed	Relinquished	Notes
First Air Force	December 17, 1941	December 18, 1942	
Air Service Command	December 19, 1942	March 16, 1943	
First Air Force	March 17, 1943	June 5, 1945	
Continental Air Forces	June 6, 1945	March 31, 1946	Redesignated Strategic Air Command, March 21, 1946
Tactical Air Command	April 1, 1946	November 30, 1948	(Note: Base put on temporary inactive status, September 1, 1946–August 1, 1950. During inactive status, the field remained under major command jurisdiction.)
Continental Air Command	December 1, 1948	December 31, 1950	
Air Defense Command	January 1, 1951	March 31, 1952	
Military Air Transport Service	April 1, 1952	May 31, 1992	Redesignated Military Airlift Command, January 1, 1966
Air Mobility Command	June 1, 1992	present	

=== Major units assigned ===
Unit	From	To	Notes
45th Bombardment Group	May 16, 1942	August 30, 1942	
312th Air Base and HQ Sq	August 31, 1942	April 10, 1944	
365th Fighter Group	August 12, 1943	November 19, 1943	
83d Fighter Group	November 22, 1943	March 31, 1946	Redesignated 125th Base Unit, April 10, 1944; redesignated 125th AAF Base Unit, September 15, 1944
320th AAF Base Unit	April 1, 1946	November 27, 1949	Redesignated 4404th Standby Base Sq, August 23, 1948
336th Fighter-Interceptor Squadron	August 13, 1950	November 10, 1950	
80th Air Base Sq	February 1, 1952	August 1, 1953	
46th Fighter-Interceptor Squadron	November 1, 1952	July 1, 1958	
1607th Air Base Group	August 1, 1953	January 8, 1966	Redesignated 1607th Air Transport Wing, November 9, 1953
Aerial Port of Embarkation	May 1, 1954	February 15, 1978	
98th Fighter-Interceptor Squadron	March 8, 1956	June 20, 1963	
4728th Air Defense Group	February 8, 1957	July 1, 1958	
95th Fighter-Interceptor Squadron	July 1, 1963	January 31, 1973	
436th Military Airlift (later Airlift) Wing	November 8, 1966	present	
912th Military Airlift Group	September 25, 1968	July 1, 1973	
512th Military Airlift (later Airlift) Wing	July 1, 1973	present	

References for history introduction, major commands and major units

== Role and operations ==
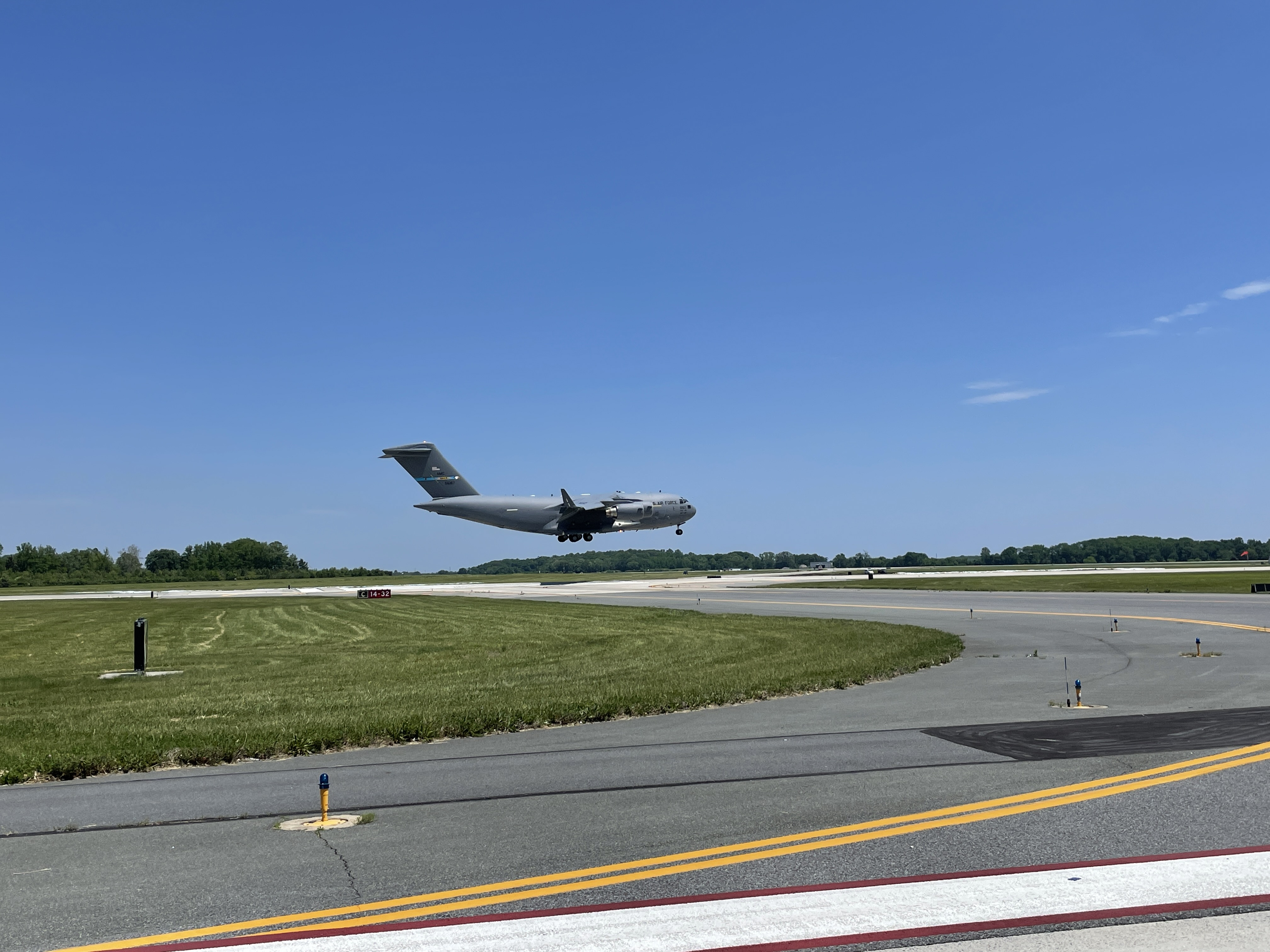
A U.S. Air Force Boeing C-17 Globemaster III landing at Dover Air Force Base in May 2022

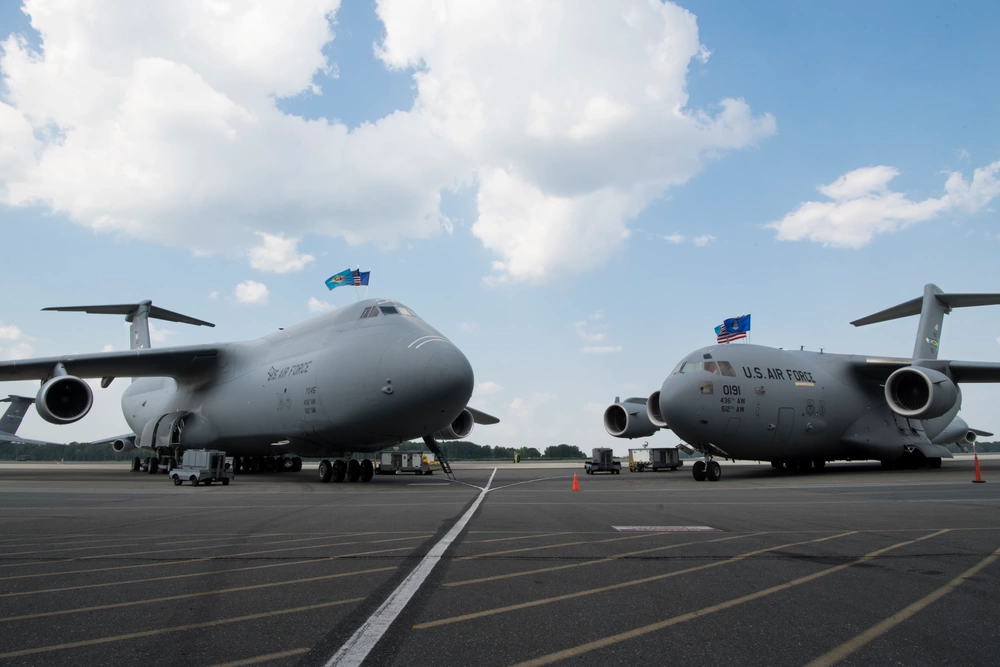
A C-5M Super Galaxy and C-17 Globemaster III on the flight line at Dover AFB during the 436th Operations Group change of command, July 2019

Dover AFB is home to the 436th Airlift Wing (436th AW) of the Air Mobility Command (AMC), known as the "Eagle Wing", and the AMC-gained 512th Airlift Wing (512th AW) of the Air Force Reserve Command (AFRC), referred to as the "Liberty Wing". It was previously the only base to solely operate the massive C-5 Galaxy and now operates both that aircraft plus the C-17 Globemaster III. The 436th AW has two active flying squadrons (the 3rd Airlift Squadron, which now operates the C-17, and 9th Airlift Squadron), and the 512th AW has two AFRC flying squadrons (the 326th Airlift Squadron and the 709th Airlift Squadron).

Dover AFB is also the home for the largest military mortuary in the Department of Defense, and has been used for processing military personnel killed in both war and peacetime; the remains of those killed overseas are traditionally brought to Dover AFB before being transferred to family. The Charles C. Carson Center for Mortuary Affairs has also been used to identify remains of civilians in certain exceptional circumstances: in 1978 for the victims of the Jonestown mass murder/suicide, in 1986 for identifying the remains of the crew of the Space Shuttle Challenger, and in 2003 for the crew of the Space Shuttle Columbia. It was also a major site for identifying the remains of military personnel killed in the 9/11 attacks. During the night of October 28, 2009, before making a decision on the committal of further troops to Afghanistan, President Barack Obama visited the base to receive the bodies of several American soldiers killed in Afghanistan.

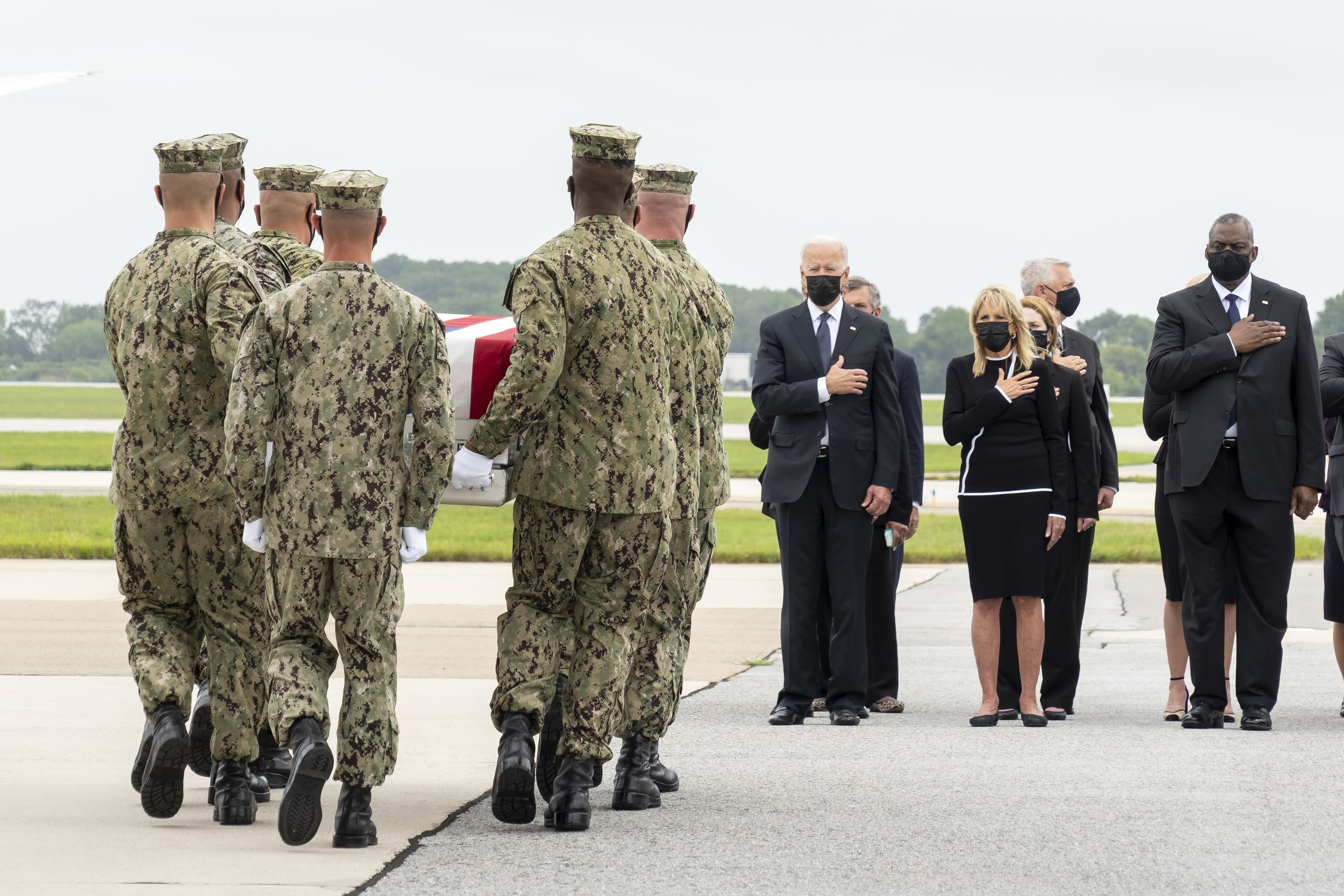
A U.S. Navy carry team during a dignified transfer at Dover AFB, August 29, 2021, for one of 13 service members killed in the 2021 Kabul airport attack

Two sections of the 436th Aerial Port Squadron warehouse collapsed on February 18, 2003, as a result of a record snow storm. No one was injured in the collapse that caused more than an estimated $1 million in damages. The damage covered two of the six cargo processing bays in the facility.

Dover Air Force Base is also home to the Air Mobility Command Museum.

=== Air show ===
Dover Air Force Base hosts periodic air shows; the most recent, Thunder Over Dover, was held in May 2022. The shows include static displays of military aircraft and equipment, and flight demonstrations by the United States Air Force Thunderbirds or United States Navy Blue Angels demonstration teams.

== Based units ==
Flying and notable non-flying units based at Dover Air Force Base:

=== United States Air Force ===
Air Mobility Command (AMC)

- Eighteenth Air Force
  - 436th Comptroller Squadron
  - 436th Airlift Wing (Host wing)
    - 436th Operations Group
      - 3rd Airlift Squadron – C-17A Globemaster III
      - 9th Airlift Squadron – C-5M Super Galaxy
      - 436th Operations Support Squadron
    - 436th Maintenance Group
      - 436th Aerial Port Squadron
      - 436th Aircraft Maintenance Squadron
      - 736th Aircraft Maintenance Squadron
      - 436th Maintenance Operations Squadron
      - 436th Maintenance Squadron
    - 436th Mission Support Group
      - 436th Civil Engineer Squadron
      - 436th Communications Squadron
      - 436th Contracting Squadron
      - 436th Force Support Squadron
      - 436th Logistics Readiness Squadron
      - 436th Security Forces Squadron
    - 436th Medical Group
      - 436th Aerospace Medicine Squadron
      - 436th Medical Operations Squadron
      - 436th Medical Support Squadron

Air Force Reserve Command (AFRC)

- Fourth Air Force
  - 512th Airlift Wing
    - 512th Operations Group
      - 326th Airlift Squadron – C-17A Globemaster III
      - 512th Airlift Control Flight
      - 512th Operations Support Squadron
      - 709th Airlift Squadron – C-5M Super Galaxy
    - 512th Maintenance Group
      - 512th Aircraft Maintenance Squadron
      - 512th Maintenance Squadron
      - 712th Aircraft Maintenance Squadron
    - 512th Mission Support Group
      - 46th Aerial Port Squadron
      - 71st Aerial Port Squadron
      - 512th Civil Engineer Squadron
      - 512th Force Support Squadron
      - 512th Logistics Readiness Squadron
      - 512th Memorial Affairs Squadron
      - 512th Security Forces Squadron
      - 512th Aerospace Medicine Squadron

=== United States Army ===
US Army Human Resources Command

- The Adjutant General Directorate
  - Casualty & Mortuary Affairs Operations Center
    - Joint Personal Effects Depot

=== Department of Defense ===
Defense Health Agency

- Research and Innovation Directorate
  - Armed Forces Medical Examiner System

=== Department of the Air Force ===
Field Operating Agencies

- Air Force Mortuary Affairs Operations (AFMAO)
  - Charles C. Carson Center for Mortuary Affairs (Port Mortuary)

== Facilities and aircraft ==
FAA airport diagram

The airport has two runways. Runway 14/32 measures 12903 x 150 ft (3933 x 46 m) and is paved with asphalt and concrete. Runway 1/19 measures 9602 x 150 ft (2927 x 46 m) and is paved with concrete. The airport averages 123,735 aircraft operations per year, an average of 339 per day. It is entirely military aviation. Atlas Air operates commercial cargo charter service from the base to worldwide destinations.

=== Air Mobility Command Museum ===
- Building 1301, Dover Air Force Base
- U.S. National Register of Historic Places
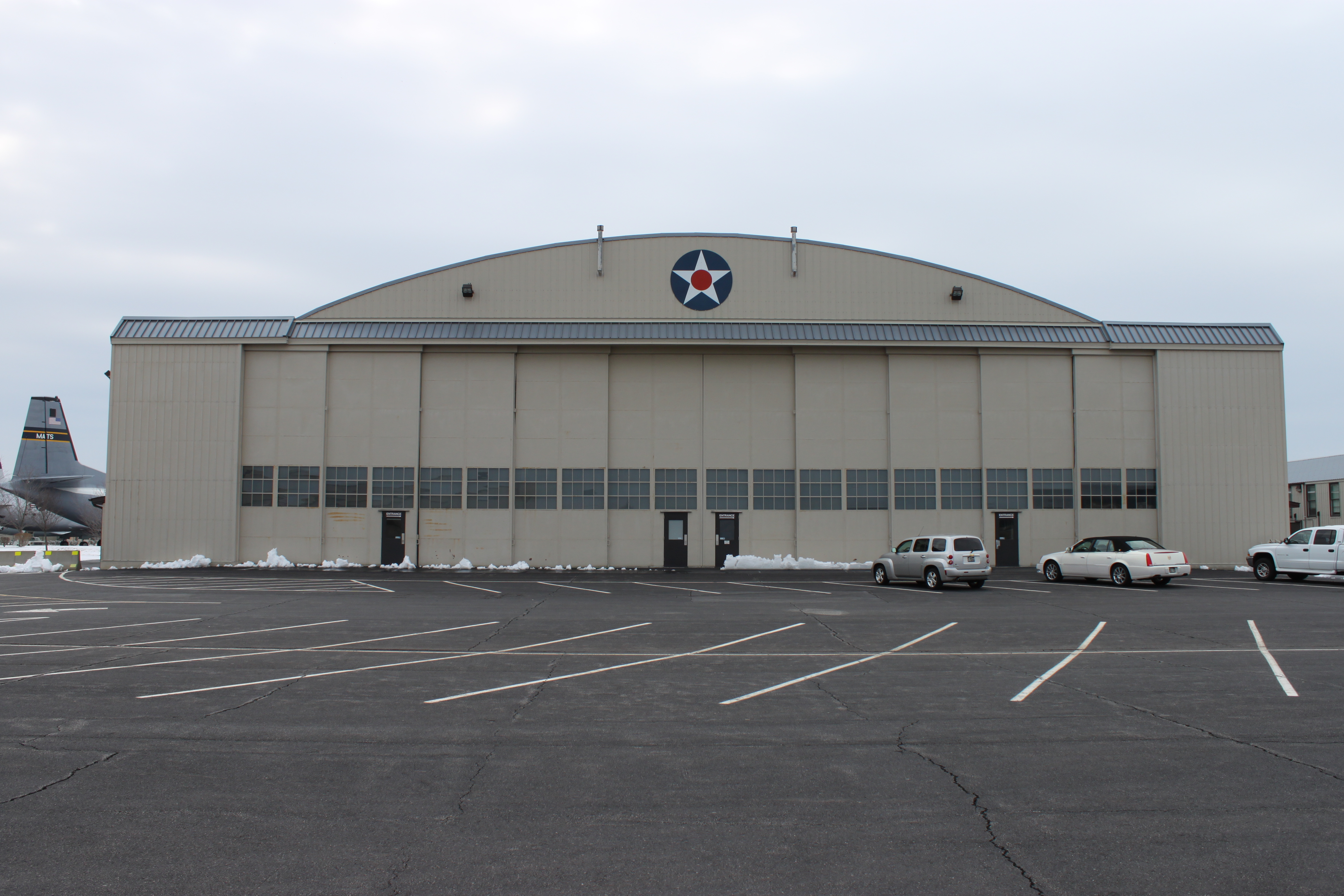
- Building 1301, January 2011

- Location within Delaware Location within the United States
- Location: Dover AFB, E. Dover Hundred, Dover, Delaware
- Area: 1 acre (0.40 ha)
- NRHP reference No.: 94001377
- Added to NRHP: December 7, 1994

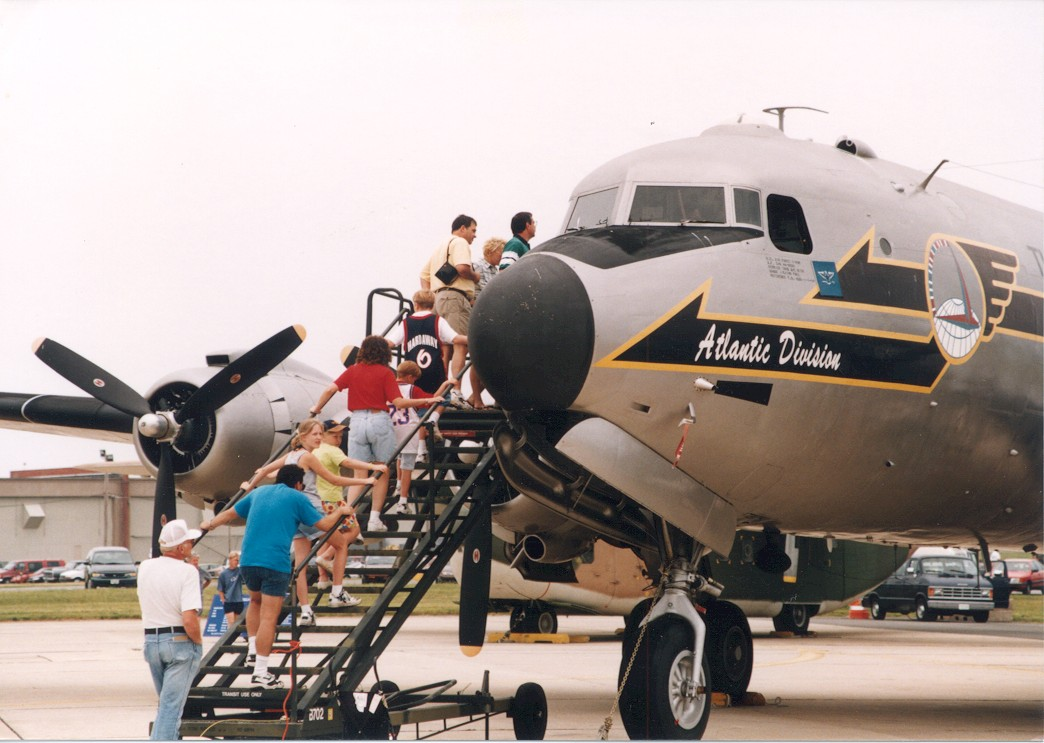
C-54 with visitors at the AMC museum

Hangar 1301 at Dover Air Force Base is home to the Air Mobility Command Museum. The museum is dedicated to military airlift and air refueling aircraft and the people who maintain them. It has a large collection of fully restored cargo and tanker aircraft. Tours are conducted during the day by volunteers, many of whom are retired pilots, navigators, flight engineers and loadmasters who provide first-person narratives of actual events. The hangar encloses over 20,000 square feet (1,900 m^{2}) of aircraft display gallery plus 1,300 square feet (120 m^{2}) of exhibit rooms. An attached 6,400-square-foot (590 m^{2}) building houses a theater, museum store, exhibit workshop, and various offices. A 100,000-square-foot (9,300 m^{2}) aircraft parking area allows close-up inspection of the outside aircraft. The museum also maintains archives related to the history of the Air Mobility Command and Dover AFB. Building 1301, Dover Air Force Base was added to the National Register of Historic Places in 1994.

As of 2015, the collection included 33 airframes and a staff of more than 170 volunteers. A single battered Douglas C-47A Skytrain, salvaged in 1986 off of a dump at Olmsted Air Force Base, near Harrisburg, Pennsylvania, after being used for target practice, was the museum's modest beginning. Airlifted to Dover AFB by a Pennsylvania National Guard helicopter, "It was the first aircraft restored for the newly conceptualized museum that would form here."

Founded as the Dover AFB Historical Center on October 13, 1986, it originally was housed in three hangars within the main area of the base. It was officially recognized with museum status in 1995 and moved to its current location in 1996. On February 5, 1997, Air Mobility Command officially named the Dover AFB Museum as the AMC Museum.

== Geography ==
A section of the base is treated as a census-designated place named "Dover Base Housing." It is part of the Dover metropolitan area. Dover Base Housing had a population of 3,450 at the 2010 census. According to the United States Census Bureau, Dover Base Housing has a total area of 0.7 square miles (1.7 km^{2}), all land.

Other portions of the base are in the city limits of Dover.

Dover Base Housing consists of a development called Eagle Heights Family Housing, which is made up of 980 homes in single-family, duplex, triplex, and fourplex configurations. The development features a community center, multiple neighborhood centers, picnic areas, fitness center, and golf course. Eagle Heights Family Housing contains a total of 19,500 feet (5,900 m) of greenbelt paths for walking, jogging, and biking. Students in the development attend public schools in the Caesar Rodney School District.

Since 1997, the base has been served by three highway exits with Delaware Route 1, allowing quick access to Dover and to southern Delaware from the complex. Dover AFB provides almost $470 million a year in revenue to the city of Dover, making it the third largest industry in Delaware.

== Demographics ==
Historical population
Census	Pop.	Note	%±
1970	8,106		—
1980	4,391		−45.8%
1990	4,376		−0.3%
2000	3,394		−22.4%
2010	3,450		1.6%
2020	2,810		−18.6%
U.S. Decennial Census

2000 census

As of the census of 2000, there were 3,394 people, 1,032 households, and 1,017 families residing in the base. The population density was 5,061.6 people per square mile (1,955.9/km^{2}). There were 1,245 housing units at an average density of 1,856.7 per square mile (717.5/km^{2}). The racial makeup of the base was 72.57% White, 16.59% African American, 0.77% Native American, 1.86% Asian, 0.12% Pacific Islander, 2.80% from other races, and 5.30% from two or more races. Hispanic or Latino of any race were 7.75% of the population.

Also per the 2000 census, of the 1,032 households, 76.1% had children under the age of 18 living with them, 90.2% were married couples living together, 5.4% had a female householder with no husband present, and 1.4% were non-families. 1.2% of all households were made up of individuals, and 0.2% had someone living alone who was 65 years of age or older. The average household size was 3.29 and the average family size was 3.30.

In the base the population was spread out, with 40.2% under the age of 18, 16.5% from 18 to 24, 41.5% from 25 to 44, 1.7% from 45 to 64, and 0.1% who were 65 years of age or older. The median age was 23 years. For every 100 females, there were 103.0 males. For every 100 females age 18 and over, there were 97.5 males.

The median income for a household in the base was $34,318, and the median income for a family was $34,659. Males had a median income of $26,322 versus $20,444 for females. The per capita income for the base was $12,119. About 5.2% of families and 4.2% of the population were below the poverty line, including 3.5% of those under age 18 and none of those age 65 or over.

=== Schools ===
Dover Base Housing is located in the Caesar Rodney School District. It is assigned to the Dover Air Base schools for grades K-8: Major George S. Welch Elementary School and Dover Air Force Base Middle School. Caesar Rodney High School in Camden is the comprehensive high school for the entire district.

Wilmington University has a center on Dover AFB.

== Notable personnel ==
Retired Maj. Gen. Archer L. Durham commanded the 436th Military Airlift Wing at Dover from February 1979 to February 1980, when it was the Air Force's only all-C-5 Galaxy wing. The Major General Archer L. Durham Award, presented annually at Dover AFB, is named in his honor.

== Accidents and incidents ==
- On April 3, 2006, a Lockheed C-5 Galaxy crashed short of runway 14/32, skidding into a farm field. There were no fatalities.
- On January 13, 2013, a Piper PA-28 made a forced landing short of the runway following fuel exhaustion during an instrument approach; the aircraft was substantially damaged and there were no fatalities.

== See also ==
- Delaware World War II Army Airfields
- Dover test
- List of United States Air Force installations
