= Niagara Falls Air Reserve Station =

United States Air Force base

- Niagara Falls, New York in the United States of America
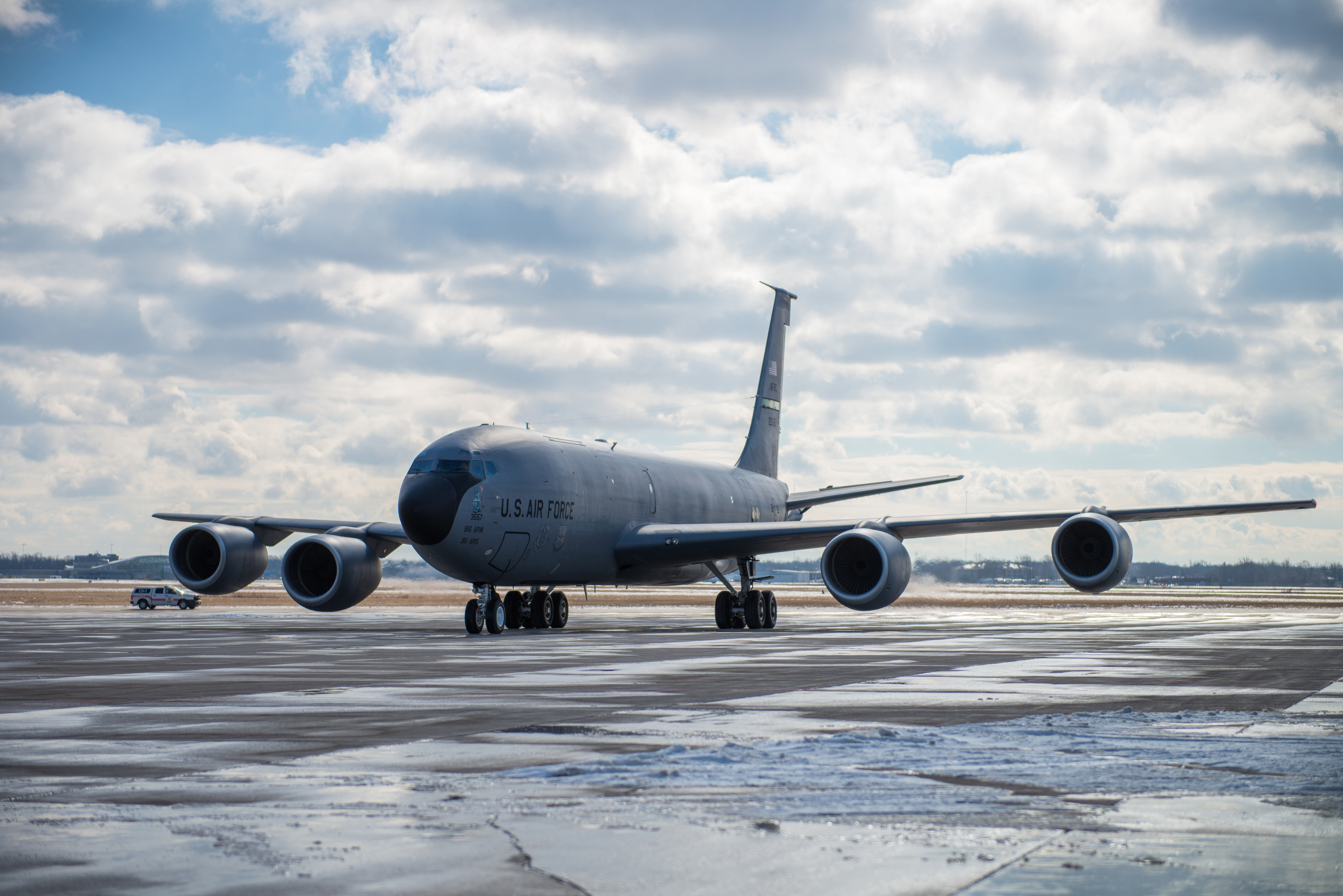
- A KC-135R Stratotanker of the 914th Air Refueling Wing based at Niagara Falls ARS.

Site information
- Type: Air Reserve Station
- Owner: Department of Defense
- Operator: US Air Force (USAF)
- Controlled by: Air Force Reserve Command (AFRC)
- Condition: Operational
- Website: www.niagara.afrc.af.mil

Location
- Location in the United States
- Coordinates: 43°06′48″N 078°56′51″W

Site history
- Built: 1928 (as Niagara Falls Airport)
- In use: 1946 – present

Garrison information
- Current commander: Colonel Joseph “20 Grit” Contino
- Garrison: 914th Air Refueling Wing (Host); 107th Attack Wing

Airfield information
- Identifiers: IATA: IAG, ICAO: KIAG, FAA LID: IAG, WMO: 725287
- Elevation: 180.4 metres (592 ft) AMSL
Runways
Direction	Length and surface
10L/28R	2,994.9 metres (9,826 ft) Asphalt/Concrete
6/24	1,581.3 metres (5,188 ft) Asphalt
10R/28L	1,210.6 metres (3,972 ft) Asphalt
- Airfield shared with Niagara Falls International Airport; Source: Federal Aviation Administration

Niagara Falls Air Reserve Station (Niagara Falls Air Force Base c. 1955-1971) is an Air Force Reserve Command military installation operationally gained by Air Mobility Command. It is located adjacent to Niagara Falls International Airport, New York, 4.7 miles (7.6 km) east-northeast of Niagara Falls, New York. The station is the last "federal" USAF installation in the state, the other remaining USAF installations falling under the Air National Guard).

The host unit for the base is the 914th Air Refueling Wing of the Air Force Reserve Command which operates the KC-135 Stratotanker. The 107th Attack Wing of the New York Air National Guard is also stationed at the base.

A Military Entrance Processing Station (MEPS) for all five branches of the U.S. is also located at the station. Both the 914 ARW and 107 ATW number in excess of 3,000 military personnel.

== History ==
The Army's Air Service had begun operations in western New York by 1917 when a school for photofinishers opened in Rochester. Niagara Falls Airport opened at Niagara Falls, New York, in 1928 as a city-owned municipal airport with four crushed-stone runways. Bell Aircraft Corporation completed a manufacturing plant in Wheatfield adjacent to the airport for World War II military pursuit planes in 1941 and the 3522d Army Air Force Base Unit managed the airport and coordinated use of the airfield.

=== Bell Modification Center ===
The Bell Modification Center at the Niagara Falls Airport was 1 of 21 built by Materiel Command in 1942 "to fit the mass production aircraft models to the needs of the specific theaters of operations". Bell was contracted to operate the center, and the airfield leased by the USAAF was improved with macadam runways (three at 4000x150 feet and the E/W runway at 4200x300), taxiways, etc. Military units at Niagara Falls included a Modification Center Headquarters and a training school, "Niagara Falls East Tr Sch" (a different modification center, "Buffalo Mun-Mod Ctr B", was located at the 1925 Buffalo Municipal Airport).

=== Naval air station ===
The Naval Air Station Niagara Falls was established in 1946 and the installation was expanded. Jurisdiction of the airport returned to a civilian agency later in 1946 (a USAF joint-use agreement was made for Air Force Reserve and NYANG use of the airport).

Continental Air Command's First Air Force assigned the Air Force Reserve's 90th Reconnaissance Wing to the military installation on 26 December 1946, followed by the 26th Reconnaissance Group (23 October 1947) and the 4th Reconnaissance Squadron. The reconnaissance units were inactivated on 27 June 1949, and the New York Air National Guard's 107th Fighter Group was federalized on 8 December 1948 (initially equipped with TAC P-47 Thunderbolts). 107th personnel deployed in March 1951 to the Far East Air Forces for the Korean War. Air Defense Command (ADC) assumed jurisdiction of the Niagara Falls military installation and the federalized 136th Fighter-Interceptor Squadron.

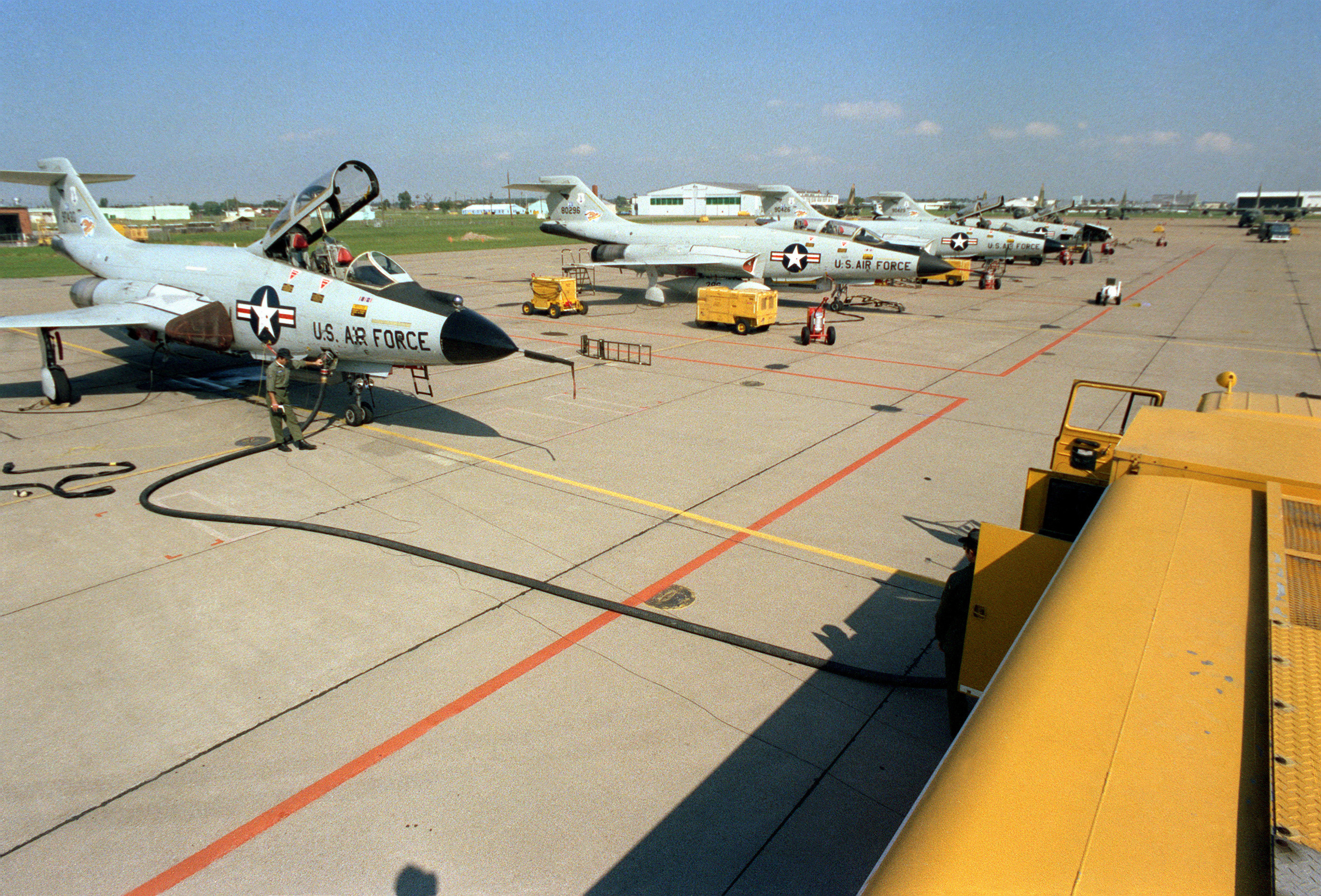
1981 tarmac of NFAFB with NYANG McDonnell F-101 Voodoos.

=== USAF base ===
Niagara Falls Air Force Base (NFAFB) was established by 1955 after the 76th Air Base Squadron was activated in February 1952 as the host unit. Following Korea operations, the 107th converted to P-51b Mustangs and was reassigned to Air Defense Command. The 136th FIS was returned to state control when ADC activated the 47th Fighter-Interceptor Squadron on 1 December 1952 as a replacement. The 47th FIS initially used the F-47s of the 135th Fighter-Interceptor Squadron. NFAFB activated the 518th Air Defense Group on 16 February 1953 (designated 15th Fighter Group on 18 August 1955 under Project Arrow) and upgraded to F-86F Sabres in February 1953 (F-86D in September).

In January 1954, the 107th received its first jet aircraft (F-94 Starfire, followed by F-86 Sabres in October 1957 & F-100C Super Sabre in August 1960). The Air Force Reserve's 445th Fighter-Bomber Group with F-84 Thunderjets moved to Niagara Falls from Buffalo Airport on 15 June 1955 and moved to Memphis on 16 November 1957. Two 15th FG aircraft--T-33 & F-86 at Niagara Falls Air Force Base—collided in 1956, the AFB's medical unit treated injuries from a 1958 railcar explosion. In 1959 a NFAFB helicopter crashed in Letchworth State Park searching for an 83-year-old professor emeritus, and in 1961 an F-100 from the base crashed into the Niagara Gorge.

SAGE interceptors
The 47th FIS aircraft were modified to the F-86L automated data link configuration after the April 1958 Syracuse Air Defense Sector was designated, and a Ground Air Transmit Receive station was built to relay ground-controlled interception commands from the sector's Hancock Field Air Defense Direction Center (DC-03) at Syracuse, New York (operational on December 1, 1958.) The F-86L interceptors were replaced by F-102 Delta Daggers in 1959 (June). NFAFB's 4621st Air Base Group was the host unit and supported the adjacent 1961-9 Niagara Falls Air Force Missile Site with CIM-10 Bomarc surface-to-air missiles. On 1 July 1960 at NFAFB, the 15th Fighter Group was inactivated and the 47th FIS was reassigned. The 107th deployed to the Berlin Crisis of 1961 for 11 months. On February 11, 1963, the 512th Troop Carrier Group equipped with C-119 Flying Boxcars was redesignated the 914th Troop Carrier Group and concurrently assigned to the Air Force Reserve at Niagara Falls. In 1968, the 107th Tactical Fighter Group was stationed at Niagara Falls Air Force Base (3rd activation in 17 years.)

Vietnam War
In July 1968, approximately 400 members of the 107th were deployed to Tuy Hoa Air Base, Republic of Viet Nam, for almost a year attached to the 31st Tactical Fighter Wing. In 1969, the Niagara Support Center was planned to be closed, and the 4621st ABG was inactivated on 31 March 1970 (the last active-duty ADC organization at the base).

=== Air reserve station ===
In 1971 the 914th assumed command of the installation from active duty units and switched from C-119 to C-130A Hercules aircraft. At the same time, the 107th converted to McDonnell F-101 Voodoo interceptors. The 1985 Niagara Falls A-4 collision of Blue Angels at the Western New York Air Show '85 was "in front of a reviewing stand" (1 pilot killed.) The 914th received C-130E aircraft in 1986, and was the first to convert to the Air Force's more advanced C-130, the H-3, in late 1992. The 107th received F-4C Phantoms, then F-4Ds and in 1990, F-16ADF Fighting Falcons.

In October 1990, over 300 members of the 914th Airlift Group spent seven months in the United Arab Emirates for Operation Desert Shield; 107th members were also activated. In 1994, the 107th Fighter Group switched to an aerial refueling mission, becoming the 107th Air Refueling Group and then the 107th Air Refueling Wing (107 ARW) in 1995. The 2005 Base Realignment and Closure Commission recommended closing the "United States Army Reserve Center and Army Maintenance Support Activity, Niagara Falls". In 2007, the 107 ARW was advised that it would change missions again to that of theater airlift, sharing C-130 Hercules aircraft as an ANG "Associate" unit to the 914 AW and re-designating as the 107th Airlift Wing (107 AW) in 2008. In 2012, it was announced that federal budget reductions due to sequestration would force yet another mission change on the 107 AW. During 2014, the 107 AW began transitioning to an unmanned / remotely piloted aircraft mission with the MQ-9 Reaper. The 107 AW flew its last airlift mission in December 2015 and in 2017 was redesignated as the 107th Attack Wing (107 ATKW), while all C-130H2 aircraft and operations remained with the 914 AW.

The USGS added the military station to the Geographic Names Information System on November 17, 2008. Since 2011, the Army Reserve's 277th Quartermaster Company has provided support for fixed-wing and rotary-wing aircraft operations.

In 2016, it was announced that the 914th would replace their aging C-130 aircraft with eight KC-135 Stratotankers. The conversion was included in the 2017 budget and changed the 914th's mission to an air refueling role with a subsequent re-designation as the 914th Air Refueling Wing (914 ARW).

=== Army Reserve Presence ===
Three Army Reserve units call the Niagara Falls Air Reserve Station home. All three are located in the Armed Forces Reserve Center (AFRC) which was built in 2013. The units are the 277th Quartermaster Company (Petroleum), 1982nd Forward Surgical Team (FST) and Alpha Company, 865th Combat Support Hospital (CSH).

=== Major units assigned ===
- 90th Reconnaissance Wing, 1946–1949
- 26th Reconnaissance Group, 1946–1949
- 107th Group (Currently designated 107th Attack Wing), 1948–Present
- 518th Air Defense Group, 1953

Re-designated 15th Fighter Group (Air Defense), 1955–1960

- 47th Fighter-Interceptor Squadron, 1952–1960
- 35th Air Defense Missile Squadron, 1960–1969
- 445th Fighter-Bomber Group, 1955–1957
- 914th Troop Carrier Group (Currently designated 914th Air Refueling Wing, 1963–Present

=== Aircraft assigned ===
- F-47 Thunderbolt, 1948–1952
- F-51 Mustang, 1952–1954
- F-86 Sabre, 1953–1960
- F-94 Starfire, 1954–1957
- F-102 Delta Dagger, 1959–1960
- F-100 Super Sabre, 1960–1970
- C-119 Flying Boxcar, 1963–1971
- F-101 Voodoo, 1971–1982
- F-4 Phantom II, 1982–1990
- F-16 Fighting Falcon, 1990–1994
- KC-135 Stratotanker, 1994–2008, 2016–Present
- C-130 Hercules, 1971–2016
- MQ-9 Reaper, 2014–Present
