= 136th Attack Squadron =

Previous aircraft squadron of the United States

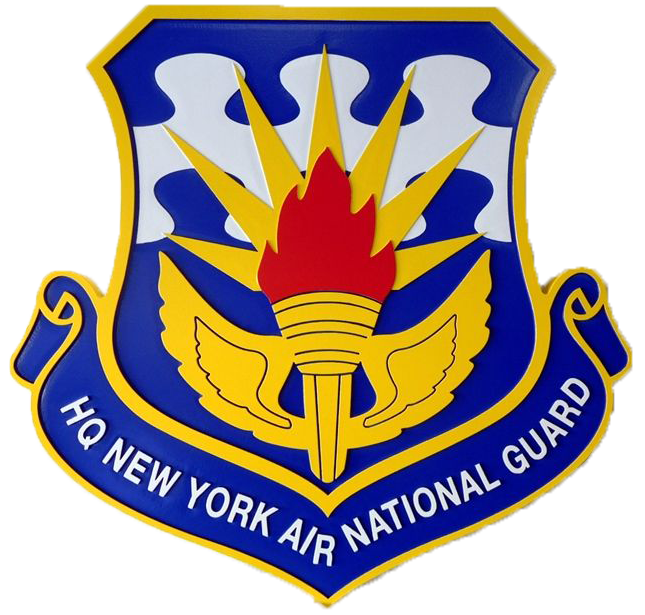
136th Attack Squadron

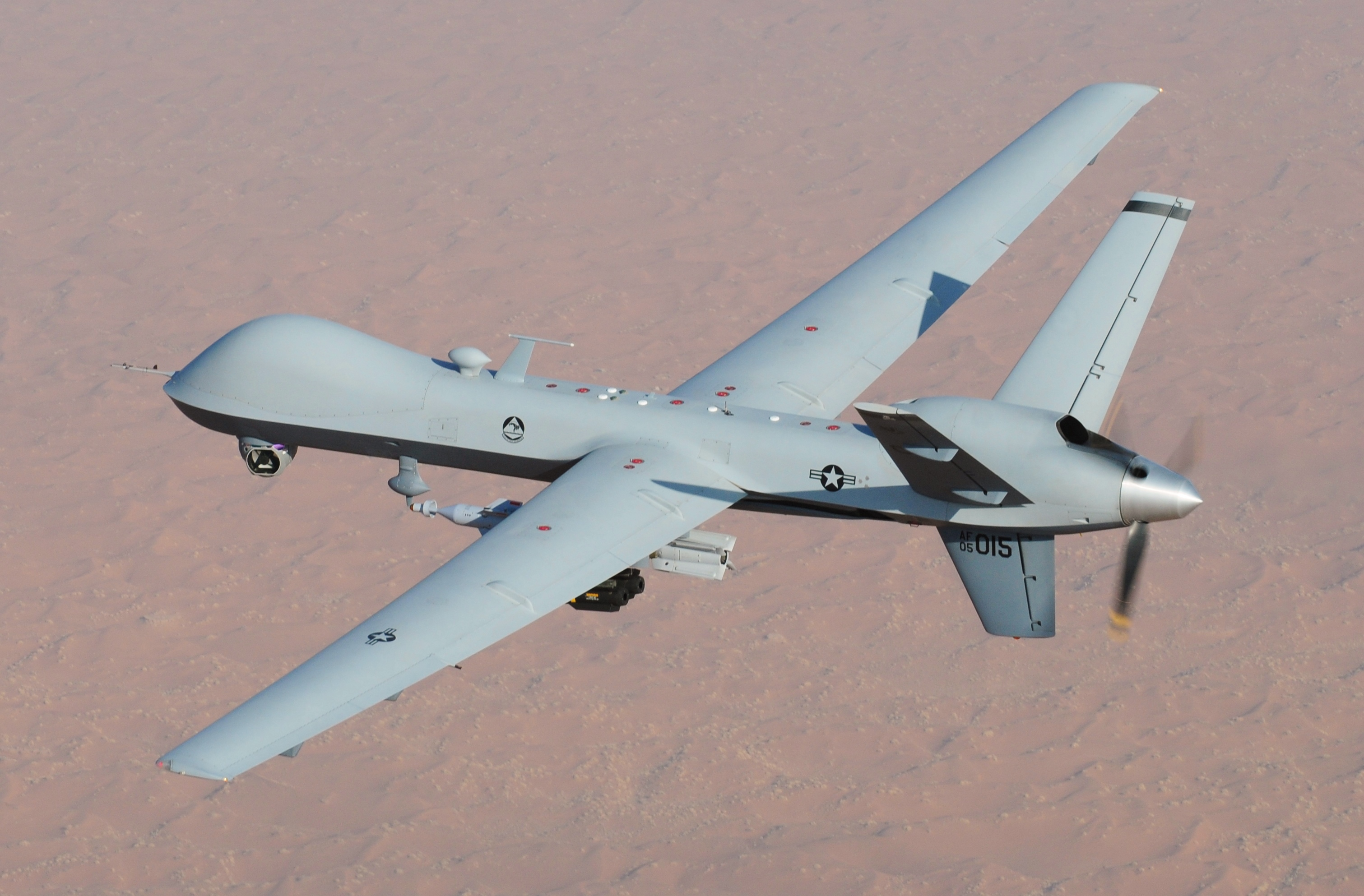
- The 136th Attack Squadron has operated MQ-9 Reapers since 2015
- Active: 1942–1945; 1948–1952; 1952–1969; 1969–present
- Country: United States
- Allegiance: New York
- Branch: Air National Guard
- Type: Squadron
- Role: Unmanned vehicle attack
- Part of: New York Air National Guard
- Garrison/HQ: Niagara Falls Joint Air Reserve Station, New York
- Decorations: Distinguished Unit Citation; Vietnamese Gallantry Cross with Palm

Insignia
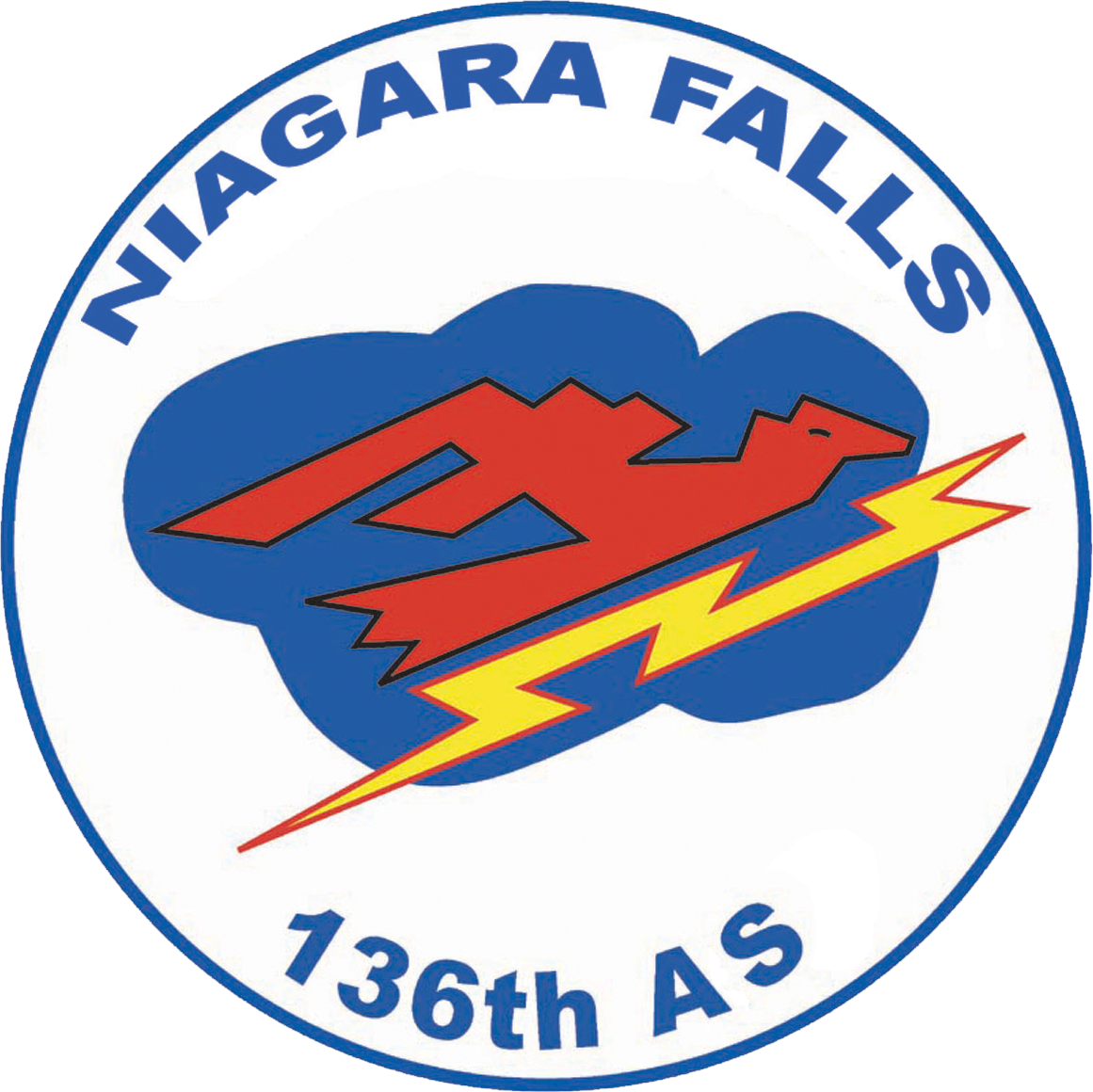
- 136th Airlift Squadron emblem

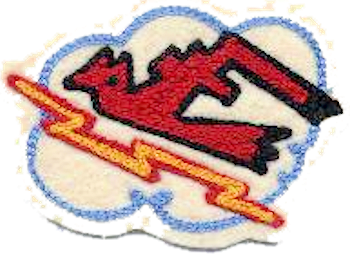
- 136th Fighter-Interceptor Squadron emblem (Note: Approved 7 August 1951. Description: On an irregular shaped cloud, outlined blue over a lightning flash yellow, outlined red, a Thunderbird red, outlined black, flying.)

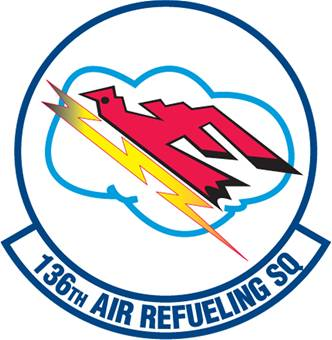
- 136th Air Refueling Squadron emblem

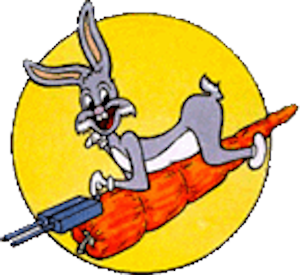
- 503d Fighter Squadron emblem

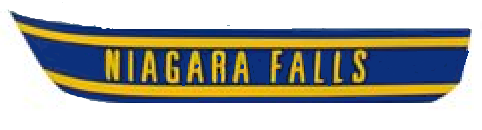
- Tail stripe
- Identification symbol: SG Tail code in Vietnam; D7 World War II fuselage code

Aircraft flown
- Attack: MQ-9 Reaper

The 136th Attack Squadron is a unit of the New York Air National Guard 107th Attack Wing located at Niagara Falls Joint Air Reserve Station, New York. The 136th is equipped with the MQ-9 Reaper. If activated to federal service, the squadron is gained by the United States Air Force's Air Combat Command.

The squadron was formed as the 482nd Bombardment Squadron during World War II. It shortly became the 503rd Fighter-Bomber Squadron, renumbering along with all other Army Air Forces single engine bombing units. After training in the United States, it deployed to England in March 1944, where it was equipped with North American P-51 Mustangs. It flew the Mustang in combat for the next year, destroying 90 enemy aircraft and earning a Distinguished Unit Citation. After V-E Day, it returned to the United States for inactivation.

The squadron was redesignated the 136th Fighter Squadron and allotted to the National Guard (Note: Although there have been a few exceptions, Air National Guard units are numbered between 101 and 299.) Activated in 1948, it was mobilized in March 1951, standing air defense alert at its home station as the 136th Fighter-Interceptor Squadron until November 1952, when it transferred its aircraft to a regular unit and returned to state control. The squadron continued as an air defense unit, augmenting Air Defense Command, until 1958, when its mission changed to fighter bomber and it became the 136th Tactical Fighter Squadron, augmenting Tactical Air Command. The squadron was mobilized a second time in 1961 for the Berlin Crisis, but tensions eased before it could deploy and it remained at Niagara Falls International Airport until being released to state control. Its third mobilization was in 1968 for the Pueblo Crisis, however this time the squadron deployed to Tuy Hoa Air Base, Vietnam, flying combat missions from there until 1969. In 1971, it returned to the air defense mission, continuing to fly fighters until converting to the air refueling mission in 1994.

The 136th Air Refueling Squadron frequently deployed its Boeing KC-135 Stratotankers to support exercises, operations and contingincies until 2008, when it became an airlift unit as the 136th Airlift Squadron. Seven years later, it lost its manned aircraft mission and became the 136th Attack Squadron, operating unmanned aerial vehicles.

== Mission ==
The squadron mission is to provide crew members and supporting staff trained to operate the General Atomics MQ-9 Reaper remotely piloted aircraft. It provides global vigilance and strike capability to support federal authorities while maintaining readiness for state contingencies. Its personnel carry out the unit mission by providing surveillance and strike support.

== History ==
=== World War II ===
==== Organization and training ====
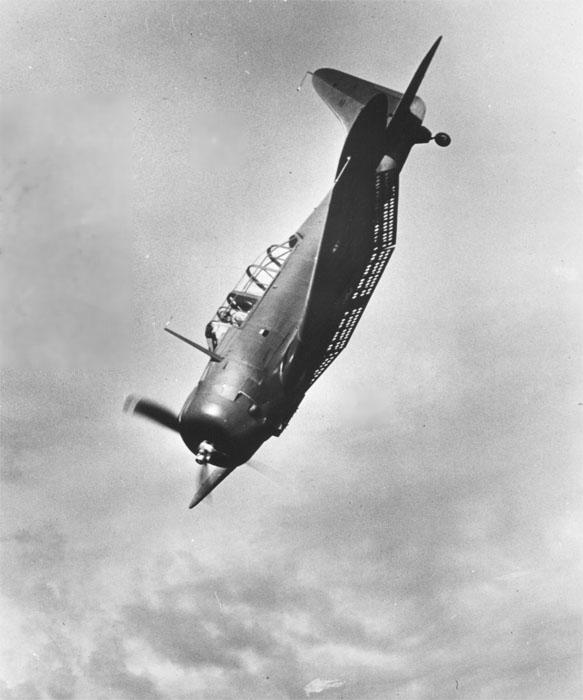
A-24, first plane flown by the squadron

The first predecessor of the squadron was formed in August 1942 as the 482nd Bombardment Squadron at Hunter Field, Georgia, one of the original four squadrons of the 339th Bombardment Group. It was equipped with Douglas A-24 Banshee dive bombers. In July 1943, it moved to Walterboro Army Air Field, South Carolina, where it re-equipped with Bell P-39 Airacobras. The following month, along with all other single engine bomber units of the Army Air Forces (AAF), it was redesignated as a fighter-bomber unit, becoming the 503rd Fighter-Bomber Squadron. It moved to Rice Army Air Field, California in September 1943, where in addition to training with its P-39s, it participated in maneuvers. It departed Rice for the European Theater of Operations on 9 March 1944, sailing from the New York Port of Embarkation on the MV Stirling Castle on 22 March.

==== Combat in the European Theater ====
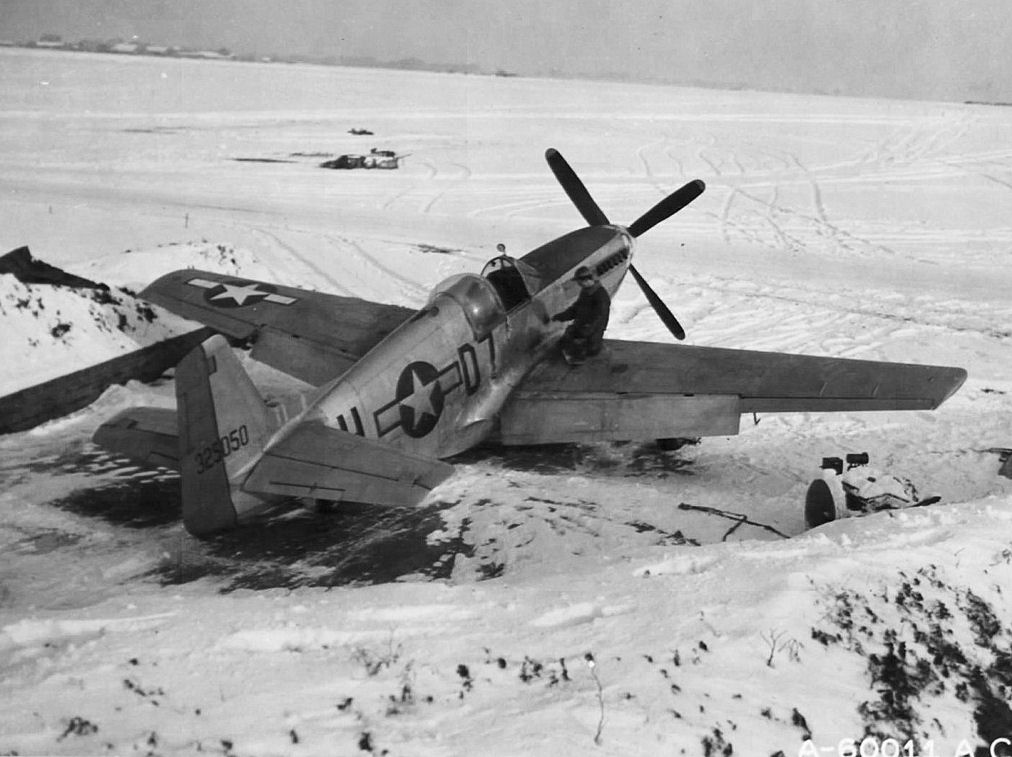
Squadron P-51 Mustang in the snow (Note: Aircraft is North American P-51C-10-NT Mustang, serial 43-25020 D7-H with a Malcom Hood. This plane crashed on an escort mission near Magdeburg, Germany on 28 March 1945 with the loss of the pilot. Dirkx, Marco (21 June 2024). "1943 USAF Serial Numbers". Joe Baugher. Missing Aircrew Report 12872.)

The squadron landed in England on 4 April and arrived at its combat station, RAF Fowlmere, the next day. Its first airplane arrived on 12 April, a North American P-51B Mustang. It quickly converted to the new fighter, and flew its first combat mission, a fighter sweep, on 30 April. In May, it dropped the "Bomber" from its name, becoming the 503rd Fighter Squadron. It flew escort for Boeing B-17 Flying Fortress and Consolidated B-24 Liberator heavy bombers during its first five weeks of operations, and afterwards flew escort missions to cover operations of medium and heavy bombers that struck strategic objectives, interdicted enemy lines of communication, and provided air support for ground forces. In June 1944, it began to receive updated P-51D models of the Mustang. The 339th Group was also the first VII Fighter Command unit to be equipped with g-suits, which enabled its fighters to make tighter turns in dogfights.

On D-Day It provided fighter cover over the English Channel and the coast of Normandy for the landing forces. It strafed and dive bombed vehicles, locomotives, marshaling yards, flak batteries, and troops while Allied forces fought to break out of the beachhead in France. It attacked transportation targets during Operation Cobra, the July breakout at Saint Lo, and the subsequent Allied drive across France. It flew area patrols during Operation Market-Garden, the airborne landings attempting to secure a bridgehead across the Rhine in the Netherlands in September.

The squadron frequently strafed airfields and other targets of opportunity while on escort missions. (Note: These were named "Jackpot" missions, with fighters assigned a specific area to strafe. Freeman, p. 159.) It was awarded the Distinguished Unit Citation for its actions on escort missions on 10 and 11 September 1944. On the first day, after escorting bombers attacking a target in Germany, it attacked Erding Airfield, destroying or damaging enemy aircraft despite intense fire from antiaircraft guns and small arms. The following day it escorted a formation of bombers attacking Munich that was attacked by enemy interceptor aircraft, in the strongest defense put up by Luftflotte Reich since May. The 339th Group shot down fifteen enemy fighters and drove off the remaining attacking aircraft, while other elements attacked an airfield near Karlsruhe, encountering heavy fire, but damaging or destroying numerous aircraft parked on the field. (Note: The 339th Group was the only group in VIII Fighter Command to destroy more than 100 aircraft on the ground on two occasions. Both were in April 1945. Freeman, p. 249.)

The squadron escorted bombers to, and flew patrols over the battle area during the Battle of the Bulge, the German counterattack in the Ardennes in December 1944 through early January 1945. In March 1945 it supported Operation Varsity, the assault across the Rhine in Germany, patrolling the area to prevent German air attacks. It flew its last combat mission on 21 April 1945. The squadron was credited with 90 air to air victories during its year in combat.

In August and September 1945, the squadron transferred its planes to depots and many of its personnel were reassigned. The remaining squadron members left the theater in September, preceding the remainder of the 339th Group, which sailed on the RMS Queen Mary in October. It was briefly stationed at Drew Field once again before inactivating on 7 November 1945.

=== New York Air National Guard ===
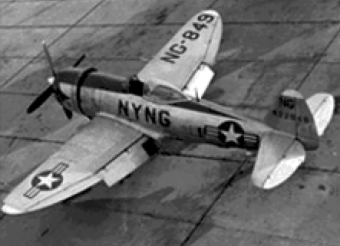
Squadron F-47D Thunderbolt (Note: Aircraft is Republic P-47D-30-RA Thunderbolt, serial 44-33849)

The 503d Squadron was redesignated the 136th Fighter Squadron and allotted to the National Guard on 24 May 1946. It was organized at Niagara Falls Municipal Airport, New York, and extended federal recognition on 8 December 1948. The squadron was equipped with Republic F-47D Thunderbolts and assigned to the 107th Fighter Group. The mission of the 136th Fighter Squadron was to train and equip to be capable of immediate mobilization to perform its Federal mission and to function efficiently when called on by the State of New York to preserve peace, order and public safety.

==== Korean War mobilization ====
The 136th was called to active duty on 2 March 1951 as a result of the Korean War, and assigned to the 101st Fighter-Interceptor Group, stationed at Dow Air Force Base, Maine. On mobilization, the squadron was redesignated the 136th Fighter-Interceptor Squadron. Although now performing an active air defense mission, it remained at Niagara Falls. In February 1952, the squadron was reassigned to the 4708th Air Defense Wing, stationed at Selfridge Air Force Base, Michigan. On 1 November 1952 the squadron was released from active duty and its air defense mission, personnel and F-47s were transferred to the 47th Fighter-Interceptor Squadron, which was simultaneously activated at Niagara Falls.

==== Air defense ====
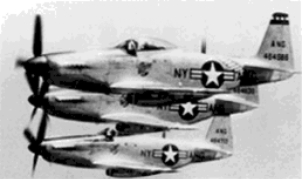
Squadron F-51Hs in flight

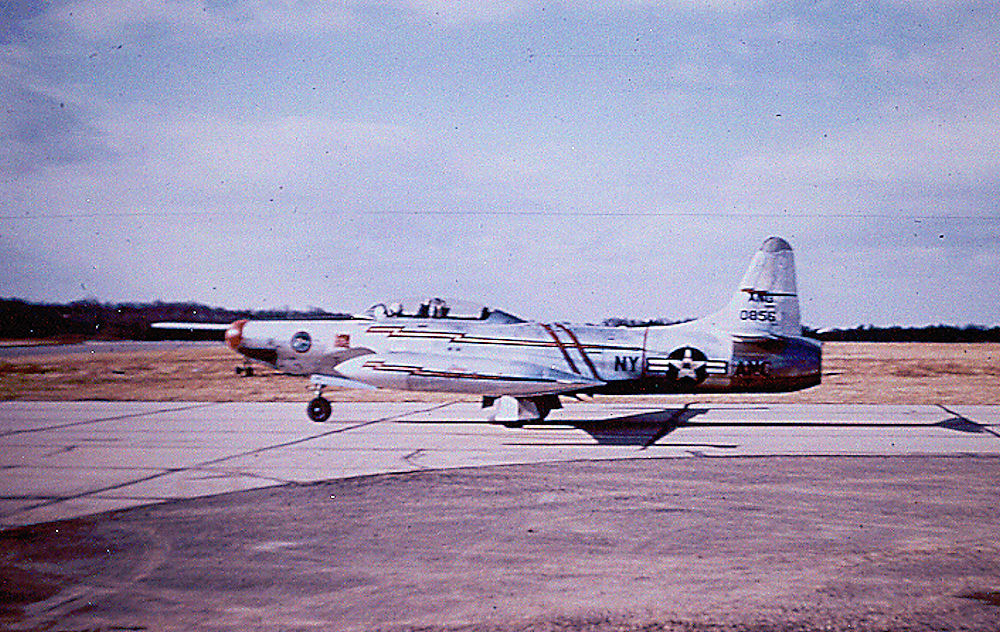
107th Fighter-Interceptor Group F-94 (Note: Aircraft is Lockheed F-94B-1-LO, serial 50-0856, taken in 1955.)

The unit was reformed at Niagara Falls on 1 December 1952, absorbing the resources of the 8136th Air Base Squadron, which had been formed on 1 June in anticipation of the squadron's return to state service. Forty per cent of the 136th's personnel served overseas, many in Korea, and provided combat experience for the squadron. It was equipped with the North American F-51H Mustang very long range fighter. By 1954, the Mustang was ending its service life and the squadron received its first jet Lockheed F-94B Starfires in February 1954. However, the F-94 required a two-man aircrew, a pilot and an observer, to operate its radar equipment. The additional recruitment of guardsmen led to the units' having a manning and capabilities problem. It was not until 1955 that a regular flow of graduates from the radar observer school began. (Note: This did not solve the problem, which persisted until the squadron converted to single seat F-86Hs in 1957. Adjutant General Report 1957, p. 97.)

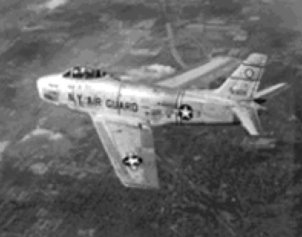
Squadron F-86H in flight

In 1956, the 107th Fighter-Interceptor Wing was reorganized and redesignated the 107th Air Defense Wing. The 136th Fighter-Interceptor Squadron remained at Niagara Falls and was assigned directly to the wing. The North American F-86H Sabre replaced the F-94 Starfires in 1957.

==== Tactical fighter operations ====
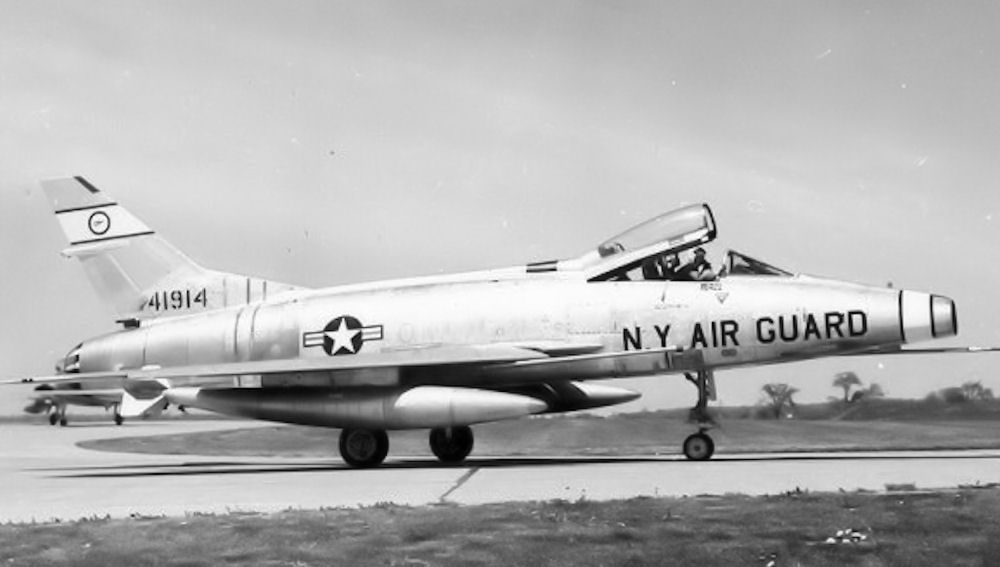
Squadron F-100C about 1960 (Note: Aircraft is North American F-100c-20-NA Super Sabre, serial 54-1914. This plane crashed during a night gunnery mission at Avon Park Gunnery Range during the squadron's preparation for deployment to Vietnam. Dirkx, Marco (6 May 2024). "1954 USAF Serial Numbers". Joe Baugher's Serial Number List.)

A major mission change to the 136th Fighter-Interceptor Squadron in 1958 was the transition from an Air Defense Command (ADC) mission to Tactical Air Command (TAC) and a tactical fighter mission, with the 136th being redesignated as the 136th Tactical Fighter Squadron. The new assignment involved a change in the squadron's training mission to include high-altitude interception, air-to-ground rocketry, ground strafing and tactical bombing. The squadron retained F-86H Sabres until 1960, when they were replaced by North American F-100C Super Sabre. In October 1961, the squadron was called to active duty for the Berlin Crisis. Although the squadron was slated to deploy to Bitburg Air Base, tensions eased and the squadron did not deploy before being returned to state control in August 1962.

In 1962, the 107th Tactical Fighter Group moved back to Niagara Falls, with the activation of the 174th Tactical Fighter Group at Syracuse and the 136th was again assigned to it. Six F-100 fighters of the 136th deployed to Hickam Air Force Base, Hawaii in 1965 for Operation Tropic Lighting I at Hickam Air Force Base, Hawaii. This was the first Pacific Ocean crossing by an Air National Guard (ANG) fighter unit.

The squadron provided close air support for jungle warfare training of the U. S. Army's 25th Division in Hawaii prior to its combat deployment to South Vietnam The squadron flew its jets across the Pacific and refueled twice in flight, marking the first time an ANG unit has performed such a mission. Exercise Tropic Lightning lasted from August to October 1965, with members of the squadron rotating to Hickam Air Force Base, Hawaii for the exercise.

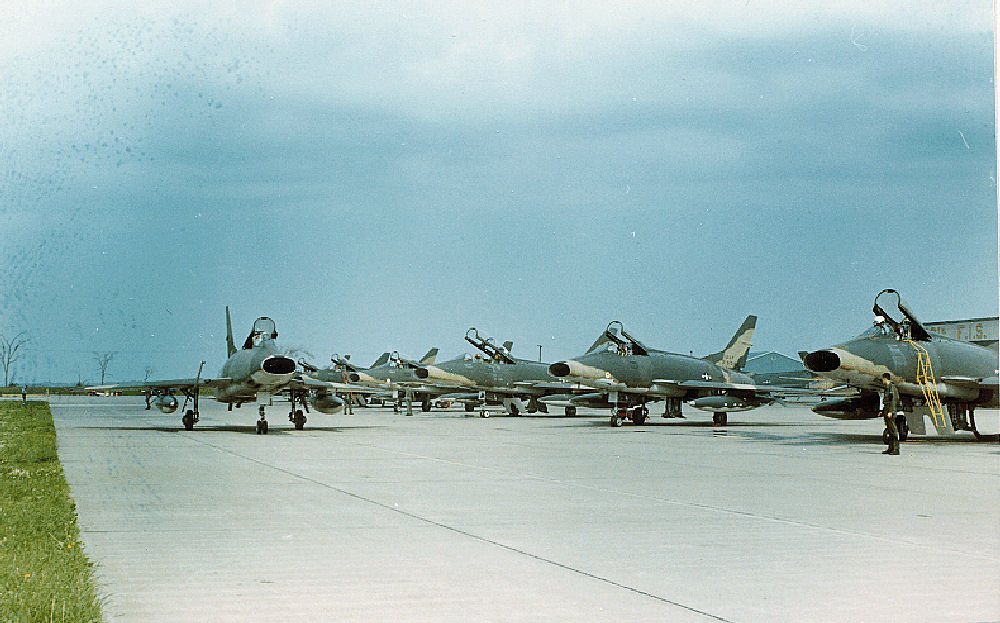
Squadron F-100s after their return from Tuy Hoa Air Base, now in camouflage paint, 1969

On 26 January 1968, the 136th Tactical Fighter Squadron was federalized in the wake of the USS Pueblo crisis. It deployed to Cannon Air Force Base, New Mexico for gunnery and close air ground support training in April. (Note: The squadron lost three airplanes and their pilots during this preparation for deployment. Unit Histories, 136 Attack Squadron.) In June, the squadron moved to Tuy Hoa Air Base, South Vietnam to reinforce the 31st Tactical Fighter Wing. It was joined at Tuy Hoa by the New Mexico Air National Guard 188th Tactical Fighter Squadron. From Tuy Hoa, the squadron conducted combat operations, carried out interdiction strikes, conducted visual and photo reconnaissance, rescue combat air patrols, and suppressed enemy antiaircraft artillery. The squadron also conducted air operations against enemy forces during the 1968 Tet Offensive and the Siege of Khe Sanh from February to April 1968. It flew close air support missions during the Battle of Kham Duc on 12 May 1968. The squadron was returned to Niagara Falls in late May and returned to state control on 11 June 1969.

==== Return to air defense ====
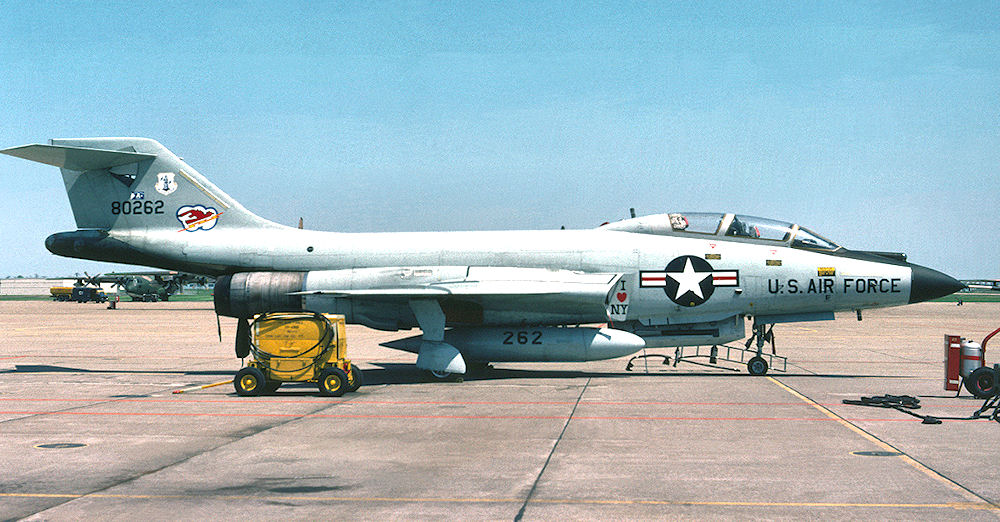
Squadron F-101F about 1976 (Note: Aircraft is McDonnell F-101F-106-MC VooDoo, serial 58-0262. This plane was sent to the Aerospace Maintenance and Regeneration Center (AMARC) in May 1982. It was later used as a ground instruction airframe at Clark Air Base, Philippines. Dirkx, Marco (26 April 2024). "1958 USAF Serial Numbers". Joe Baugher’s Serial Number List.)

The 136th Tactical Fighter Squadron returned to an air defense mission in June 1971 when it received McDonnell F-101B Voodoo interceptors and rejoined ADC. In 1972, after the completion of the transition to the Voodoo from the F-100s, the 136th Fighter-Interceptor Squadron began operating on a 24 hour a day alert as part of North American Air Defense Command (NORAD), with its alert aircraft operating under the control of 21st Air Division. In 1979, ADC was inactivated and the air defense mission was assumed by Tactical Air Command. The squadron became gained by Air Defense, Tactical Air Command, which functioned at the Numbered Air Force echelon of TAC. In 1981 the 136th was re-equipped with McDonnell F-4C Phantom IIs and, after a pause to train in the new fighter, resumed NORAD alert in 1982. From January to March 1984, the squadron also placed Phantoms on alert at George Air Force Base, California while the California Air National Guard's 144th Fighter-Interceptor Wing converted to the F-4. Immediately following this deployment, six squadron aircraft replaced those of the 57th Fighter-Interceptor Squadron at Keflavik Air Base, Iceland, while the 57th was participating in an exercise at Tyndall Air Force Base, Florida and transitioning to new aircraft. Beginning in July 1985, a detachment of the squadron was formed to provide air defense alert at Charleston Air Force Base, South Carolina.

The 136th received more advanced McDonnell F-4D Phantom IIs in April 1986. That month, the squadron deployed eight aircraft to Ramstein Air Base, Germany, where they stood Zulu Alert in Operation Creek Klaxon. This element was augmented by personnel from other ANG units, and was the first time Guard aircraft stood alert in Europe. ANG squadrons rotated to stand alert at Ramstein for just over a year while the 86th Tactical Fighter Wing converted to General Dynamics F-16 Fighting Falcons. The 136th resumed its alert duties on 1 April 1987. With the detachment at Charleston, the 136th was on alert over a 1,480-mile round-trip area. Interceptors from Charleston monitored Soviet Air Force Tupolev Tu-95 Bear bombers flying down the Atlantic seacoast to and from airfields in Cuba.

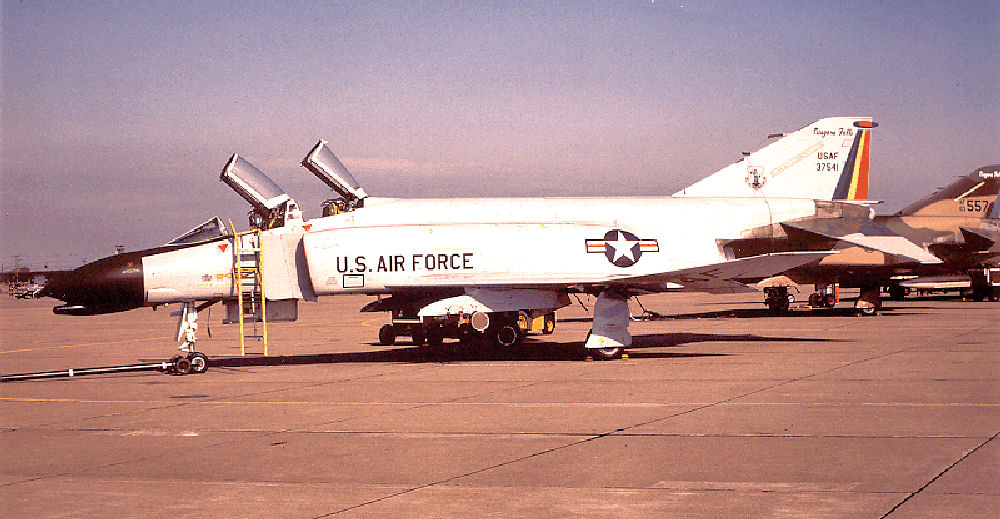
Squadron McDonnell F-4C about 1983 (Note: Aircraft is McDonnell F-4C-19-MC Phantom, serial 63-7541. The crew of this aircraft was credited with shooting down a MiG-21 while assigned to the 480th Tactical Fighter Squadron in Thailand. It was sent to AMARC on 25 February 1987, then on 22 April 1991 to the Tolicha Peak Range for use as a target. Dirkx, Marco (8 July 2024). "1963 USAF Serial Numbers". Joe Baugher’s Serial Number List.)

The 136th replaced its Vietnam Era F-4D Phantom II fighter aircraft with 20 Block 15 F-16 Fighting Falcon fighters configured as air defense fighters in 1990. Personnel and aircraft deployed to Jacksonville Air National Guard Base, Florida, taking advantage of the better weather conditions to accelerate the F-16 conversion. Due to its air defense commitment, the 136th was not mobilized during the 1991 Gulf Crisis.

In 1992, the 136th was redesignated as the 136th Fighter Squadron. On 1 October 1995, the ANG adopted the Air Force Objective Organization plan, and the squadron was assigned to the new 107th Operations Group.

==== Air refueling ====
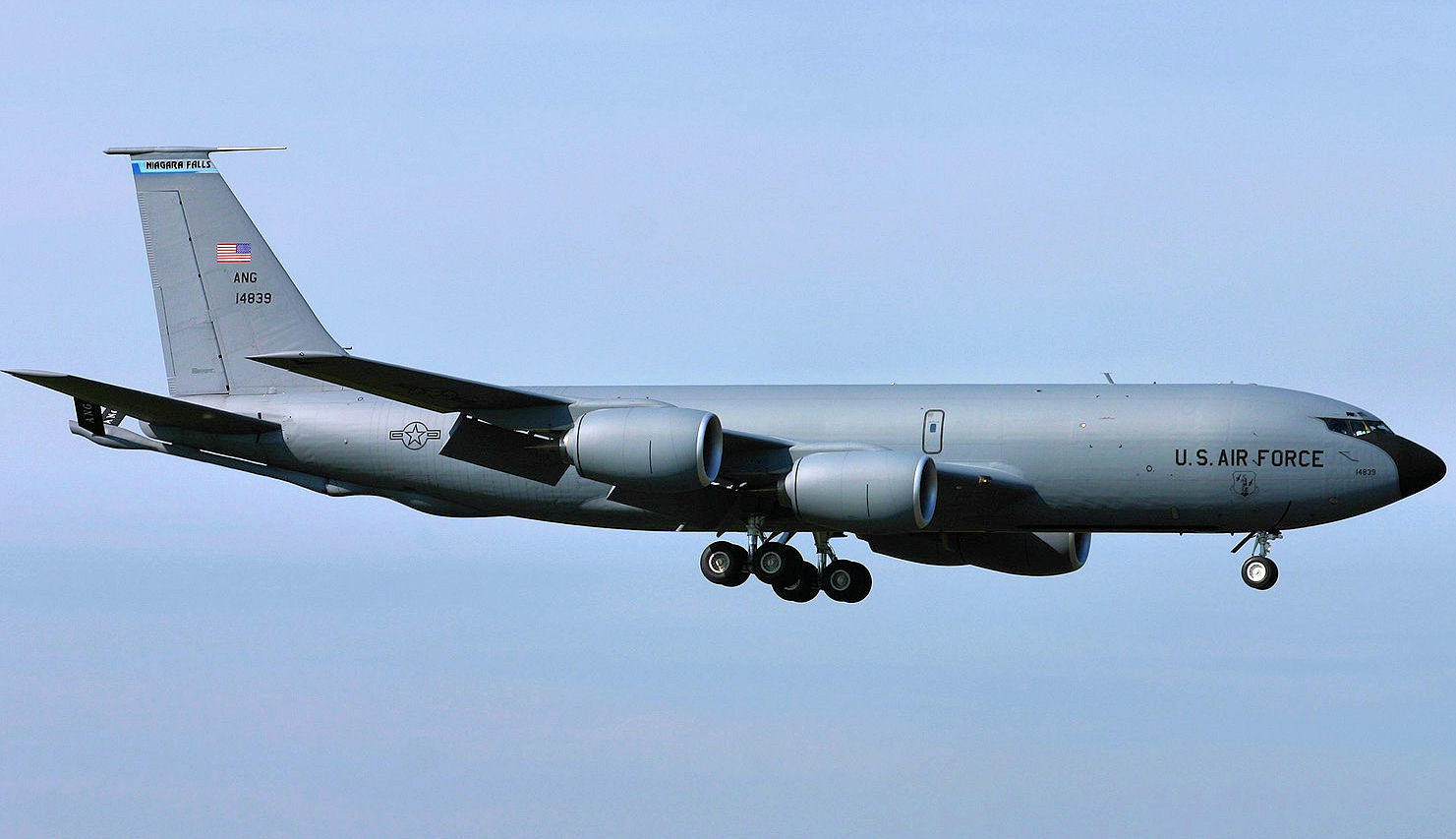
Squadron KC-135R Stratotanker (Note: Aircraft is Boeing KC-135R-BN Stratotanker, Maid of the Mist, serial 64-14839. Built as a KC-135A-BN, and converted to KC-135R. Transferred to the 108th Air Refueling Squadron. Dirkx, Marco (8 April 2024). "1964 USAF Serial Numbers". Joe Baugher’s Serial Number List.)

With the arrival of the KC-135R Stratotanker in March 1994, the 136th Fighter Squadron converted from an air defense mission to air refueling and was redesignated as the 136th Air Refueling Squadron. The 136th provided support for worldwide air refueling missions. When called upon, the 136th also used the KC-135R as a cargo and passenger transport. ts planes were equipped with the Pacer Crag avionics and cockpit update, which enabled them to operate without navigators.

In mid-1996, the Air Force, in response to budget cuts, and changing world situations, began experimenting with air expeditionary organizations. It developed the Air Expeditionary Force concept that mixed active duty, reserve and National Guard elements into a combined force. Instead of entire units deploying as provisional units as in the 1991 Gulf War, expeditionary units are composed of aviation packages" from several wings, married together to carry out the assigned deployment rotation. Since then, when the 136th is the major force provider for a deployment, the 136th Expeditionary Air Refueling Squadron was formed to support world contingencies including operations including Strong Resolve 2002, Operation Uphold Democracy, Operation Deny Flight, Operation Decisive Endeavor, Operation Noble Eagle, Operation Enduring Freedom, Operation Iraqi Freedom and the Northeast Tanker Task Force.

==== Airlift operations ====
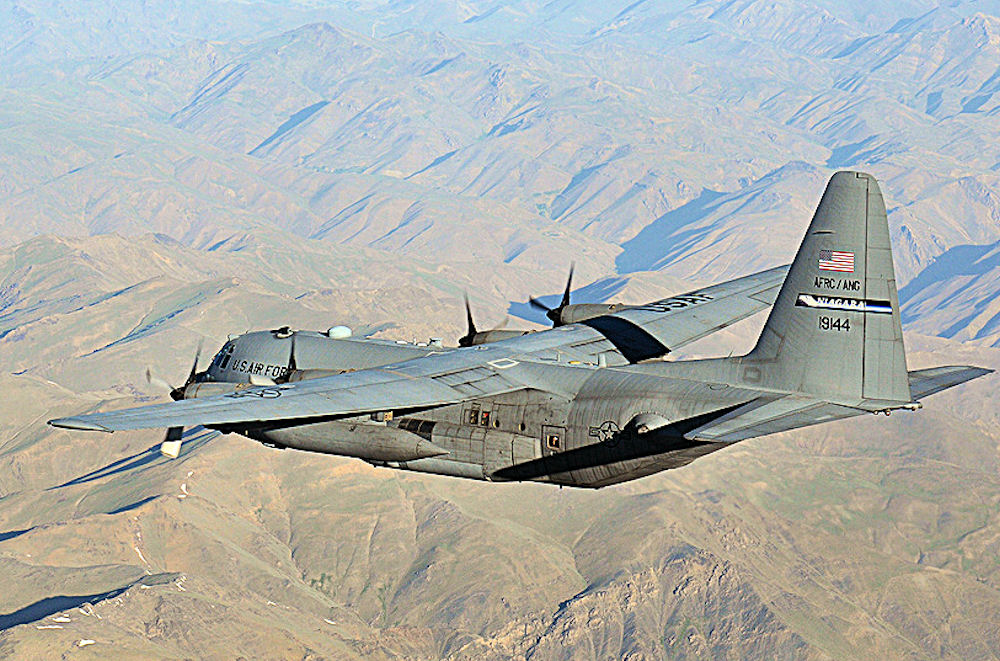
A 136th Expeditionary Airlift Squadron C-130 Hercules flying over Afghanistan

In November 2007, the 107th was notified that it would become an airlift unit. This was directed by the Base Realignment and Closure of 2005. It became an associate unit to the Air Force Reserve Command 914th Airlift Wing, already based at Niagara Falls. The 914th has had responsibility for the C-130H2 Hercules aircraft used by the 136th, and airmen from both units jointly operate them. With this change, the Niagara Falls Air Reserve Station received additional C-130 aircraft from the Tennessee Air National Guard's 118th Airlift Wing in Nashville, Tennessee. The 136th Expeditionary Airlift Squadron has deployed to both Iraq and Afghanistan in support of Operation Iraqi Freedom and Operation Enduring Freedom.

During Hurricane Sandy in late October 2012, members of the unit deployed to New York City and Long Island to assist in recovery operations. The unit was deployed first to Stewart Air National Guard Base in Newburgh and then traveled to Peekskill, which is in Westchester County. As part of the recovery effort, unit members performed road clearing, traffic control, helping displaced personnel with feeding and getting them back in their housing and getting them out of flood-stricken areas.

==== Unmanned vehicle operations ====
It was announced in early 2012 that federal budget reductions would affect the mission of the 107th Airlift Wing. In 2015, the squadron stopped operating manned aircraft and began operating the General Atomics MQ-9 Reaper. In March 2017, the squadron was redesignated the 136th Attack Squadron.

== Lineage ==
- Constituted as the 482d Bombardment Squadron (Dive) on 3 August 1942

Activated on 10 August 1942
Redesignated 503d Fighter-Bomber Squadron on 10 August 1943
Redesignated 503d Fighter Squadron, Single Engine on 30 May 1944
Inactivated on 7 November 1945

- Redesignated: 136th Fighter Squadron, Single Engine and allotted to the National Guard on 24 May 1946

Activated and received federal recognition on 8 December 1948
Federalized and ordered to active service on 2 March 1951
Redesignated 136th Fighter-Interceptor Squadron c. 2 March 1951
Inactivated and released from active duty and returned to New York state control on 1 December 1952
Activated on 1 December 1952
Redesignated 136th Tactical Fighter Squadron (Special Delivery) on 10 November 1958
Federalized and ordered to active service in October 1961
Released from active duty in August 1962
Redesignated 136th Tactical Fighter Squadron c. 15 October 1962
Federalized and ordered to active service on 26 January 1968
Inactivated, released from active duty and returned to New York state control on 11 June 1969
Redesignated 136th Fighter-Interceptor Squadron on 1 June 1971
Redesignated 136th Fighter Squadron on 16 March 1992
Redesignated 136th Air Refueling Squadron on 1 July 1994
Redesignated 136th Airlift Squadron on 1 July 2008
Redesignated 136th Attack Squadron on 15 March 2017

=== Assignments ===
- 339th Bombardment Group (later 339th Fighter-Bomber Group, 339th Fighter Group), 10 August 1942 – 18 October 1945
- Unknown, 18 October – 7 November 1945
- 107th Fighter Group, 8 December 1948
- 101st Fighter-Interceptor Group, 2 March 1951
- 4708th Defense Wing, 6 February 1952
- 107th Fighter-Interceptor Group, 1 December 1952
- 107th Air Defense Wing, 1 May 1956
- 107th Tactical Fighter Group, 10 November 1958
- 113th Tactical Fighter Wing, 1 October 1962
- 107th Tactical Fighter Group, 1 August 1962
- 140th Tactical Fighter Wing, 26 January 1968
- 31st Tactical Fighter Wing, 14 June 1968
- 107th Tactical Fighter Group (later 107th Fighter-Interceptor Group, 107th Fighter Group, 107th Air Refueling Group), 11 June 1969
- 107th Operations Group, 1 October 1995 – present

=== Stations ===
- Hunter Field, Georgia, 10 Aug 1942
- Drew Field, Florida, 6 Feb 1943
- Walterboro Army Air Field, South Carolina, 3 Jul 1943
- Rice Army Air Field, California, 17 Sept 1943 – 9 Mar 1944
- RAF Fowlmere (AAF-378), England, 5 Apr 1944 – 7 Sept 1945
- Drew Field, Florida, c. 20 Sep – 7 Nov 1945
- Niagara Falls Municipal Airport, New York, 8 December 1948 – 1 December 1952
- Niagara Falls Municipal Airport, New York, 1 December 1952
- Cannon Air Force Base, New Mexico, 16 January 1968
- Tuy Hoa Air Base, South Vietnam, 20 May 1968 – 5 June 1969
- Niagara Falls International Airport (later Niagara Falls Air National Guard Base, Niagara Falls Joint Air Reserve Station), 5 June 1969

Detachment operated from Charleston Air Force Base, South Carolina, July 1986 – June 1994

=== Aircraft ===
- Douglas A-24 Banshee, 1942–1943
- Bell P-39 Airacobra, 1943–1944
- North American P-51 Mustang, 1944–1945
- Republic F-47D Thunderbolt, 1948–1952
- North American F-51H Mustang, 1952–1954
- Lockheed F-94B Starfire, 1954–1957
- North American F-86H Sabre, 1957–1960
- North American F-100C Super Sabre, 1960–1971
- McDonnell F-101B Voodoo, 1971–1982
- McDonnell F-4C Phantom II, 1981–1986
- McDonnell F-4D Phantom II, 1986–1990
- General Dynamics Block 15 ADF F-16A/B Fighting Falcon, 1990–1994
- Boeing KC-135R Stratotanker, 1994–2008
- Lockheed C-130H Hercules, 2008–2015
- General Atomics MQ-9 Reaper, 2015–present

=== Awards and campaigns ===
Award streamer	Award	Dates	Notes
	Distinguished Unit Citation	10–11 September 1944	503d Fighter Squadron
	Presidential Unit Citation	15 June-1 December 1968	136th Tactical Fighter Squadron
	Air Force Outstanding Unit Award	15 June 1968–15 March 1969	136th Tactical Fighter Squadron
	Vietnamese Gallantry Cross with Palm	9 June 1968–19 May 1969	136th Tactical Fighter Squadron

Campaign Streamer	Campaign	Dates	Notes
	Central Europe	5 April 1944 1944–21 May 1945	503d Fighter-Bomber Squadron (later 503d Fighter Squadron)
	Air Combat, EAME Theater	5 April 1944–11 May 1945	503d Fighter-Bomber Squadron (later 503d Fighter Squadron)
	Air Offensive, Europe	5 April 1944–5 June 1944	503d Fighter-Bomber Squadron (later 503d Fighter Squadron)
	Normandy	6 June 1944–24 July 1944	503d Fighter Squadron
	Northern France	25 July 1944–14 September 1944	503d Fighter Squadron
	Rhineland	15 September 1944–21 March 1945	503d Fighter Squadron
	Ardennes-Alsace	16 December 1944–25 January 1945	503d Fighter Squadron
	Vietnam Air/Ground	9 June 1968–7 July 1968	136th Tactical Fighter Squadron
	Vietnam Air Offensive, Phase III	9 June 1968–31 October 1968	136th Tactical Fighter Squadron
	Vietnam Air Offensive, Phase IV	1 November 1968–22 February 1969	136th Tactical Fighter Squadron
	Tet 1969/Counteroffensive	23 February 1969–19 May 1969	136th Tactical Fighter Squadron

== See also ==
- List of United States Air National Guard squadrons
- List of United States Air Force airlift squadrons
- List of C-130 Hercules operators
- List of United States Air Force air refueling squadrons
- General Dynamics F-16 Fighting Falcon operators
- List of F-4 Phantom II operators
- List of F-100 units of the United States Air Force
- List of F-86 Sabre units
- F-94 Starfire units of the United States Air Force
- List of United States Air Force fighter squadrons
