= 222d Command and Control Squadron =

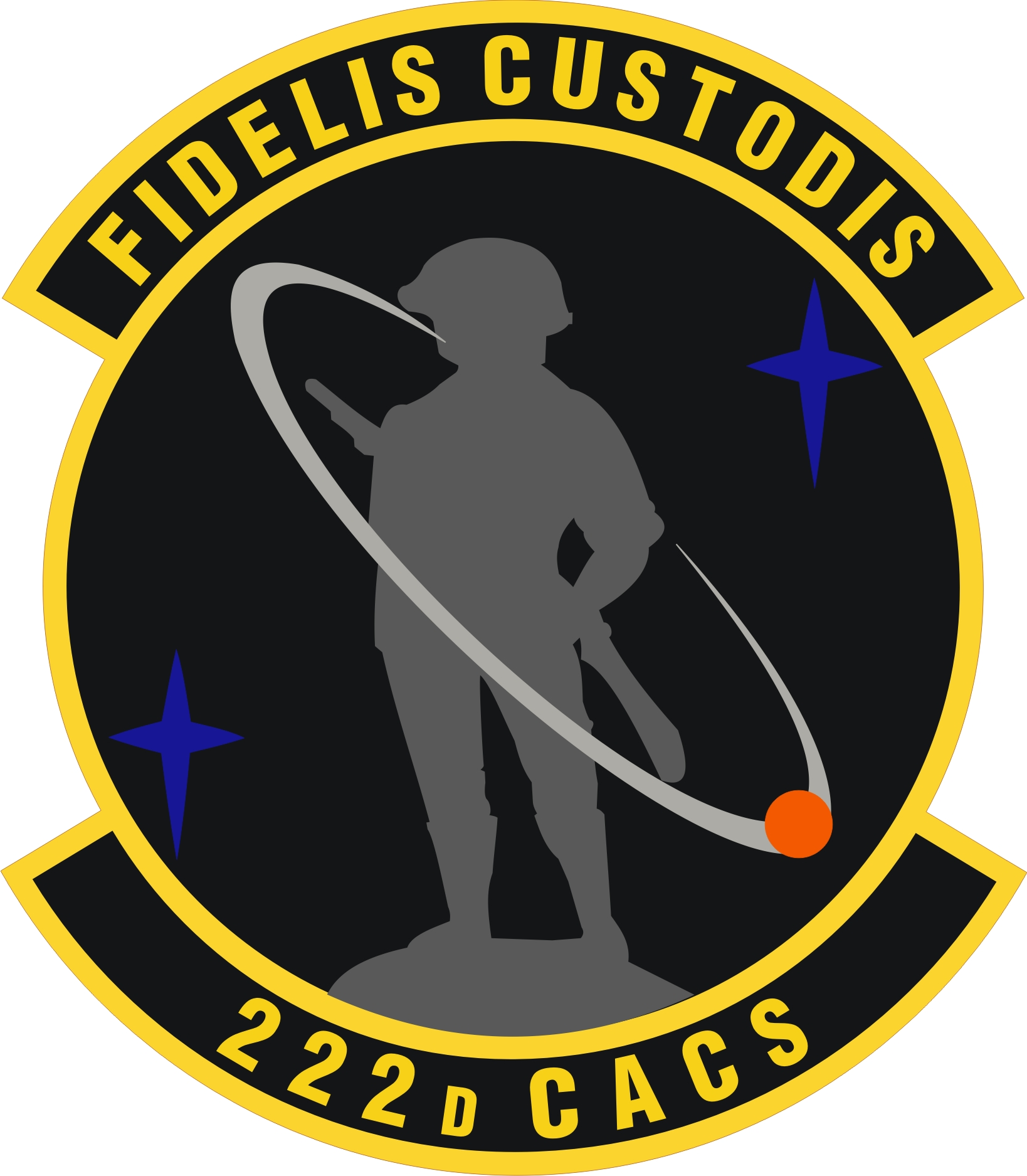
- 222d Command and Control Squadron emblem
- Active: 2008-Present
- Country: United States
- Branch: United States Air Force
- Type: Command and Control
- Role: National-level C2
- Part of: 107th Attack Wing / U.S. Space Command
- Garrison/HQ: Rome, New York
- Motto(s): "FIDELIS CUSTODIS" - Faithful Guardians

The 222d Command and Control Squadron (222 CACS) is an Air National Guard command and control squadron located at Rome, New York and Chantilly, Virginia.

== Mission ==
222 CACS provides the National Reconnaissance Office's (NRO) National Reconnaissance Office Operations Center (NOC) with augmentees to assist NRO and U.S. Space Command during times of need. 222 CACS provides support with ongoing space operations crucial to our national security. The NRO is a joint organization engaged in the research and development, acquisition, launch and operation of overhead reconnaissance systems necessary to meet the needs of the Intelligence Community and Department of Defense.

== History ==
=== Emblem ===
Ultramarine blue and Air Force yellow are the Air Force colors. Blue alludes to the sky, the primary theater of Air Force operations. Yellow refers to the sun and the excellence required of Air Force personnel. The stars symbolize the unit ties to the Air Force Space Command. The orbiting satellite represents the unit's connection to space and the National Reconnaissance Office. The satellite represents local heritage and culture. The profile of the Minuteman symbolizes the connection to the Air National Guard and the unit's rapid response capability. Emblem approved 13 March 2009.

== Previous designations ==
- 222d Command and Control Squadron (13 Nov 2008 – Present)

== Assignments ==
=== Major Command/Gaining Command ===
- Air National Guard/Air Force Space Command (13 Nov 2008 – Present)

== Locations ==
- Rome, New York/Chantilly, Virginia (13 Nov 2008 – Present)

== Photo gallery ==
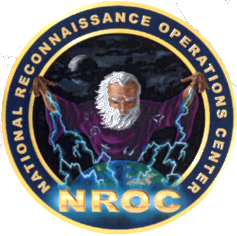
NROC logo

== See also ==
- National Reconnaissance Operations Center (NROC)
