= 107th Attack Wing =

New York Air National Guard unit

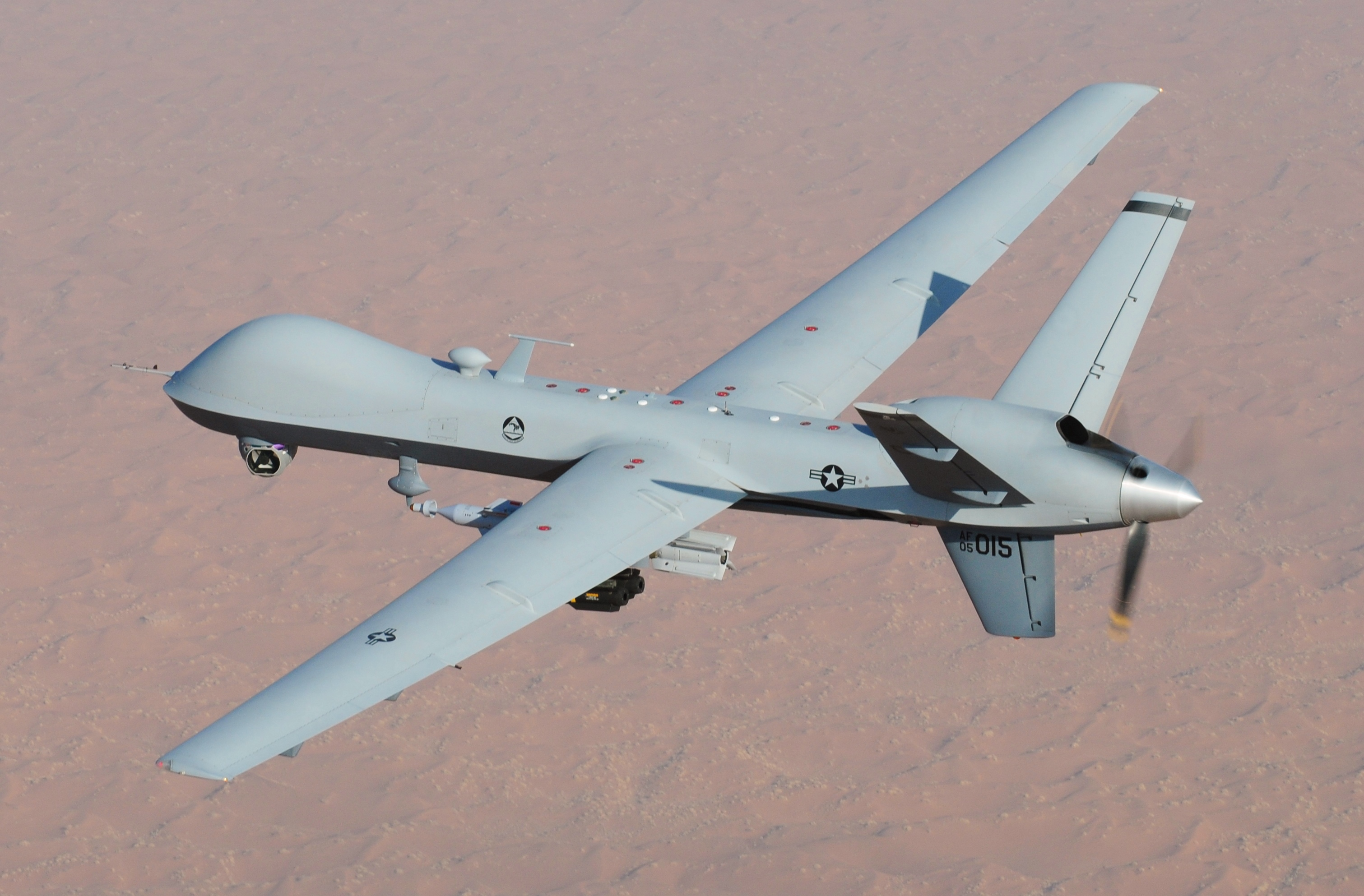
- 107th Attack Wing have operated MQ-9 Reapers since 2014
- Active: 1942–1945; 1948–present
- Country: United States
- Allegiance: New York
- Branch: Air National Guard
- Type: Wing
- Role: Attack
- Part of: New York Air National Guard
- Garrison/HQ: Niagara Falls Air Reserve Station, New York
- Motto: Strength Through Alertness
- Website: https://www.107attackwing.ang.af.mil/

Insignia
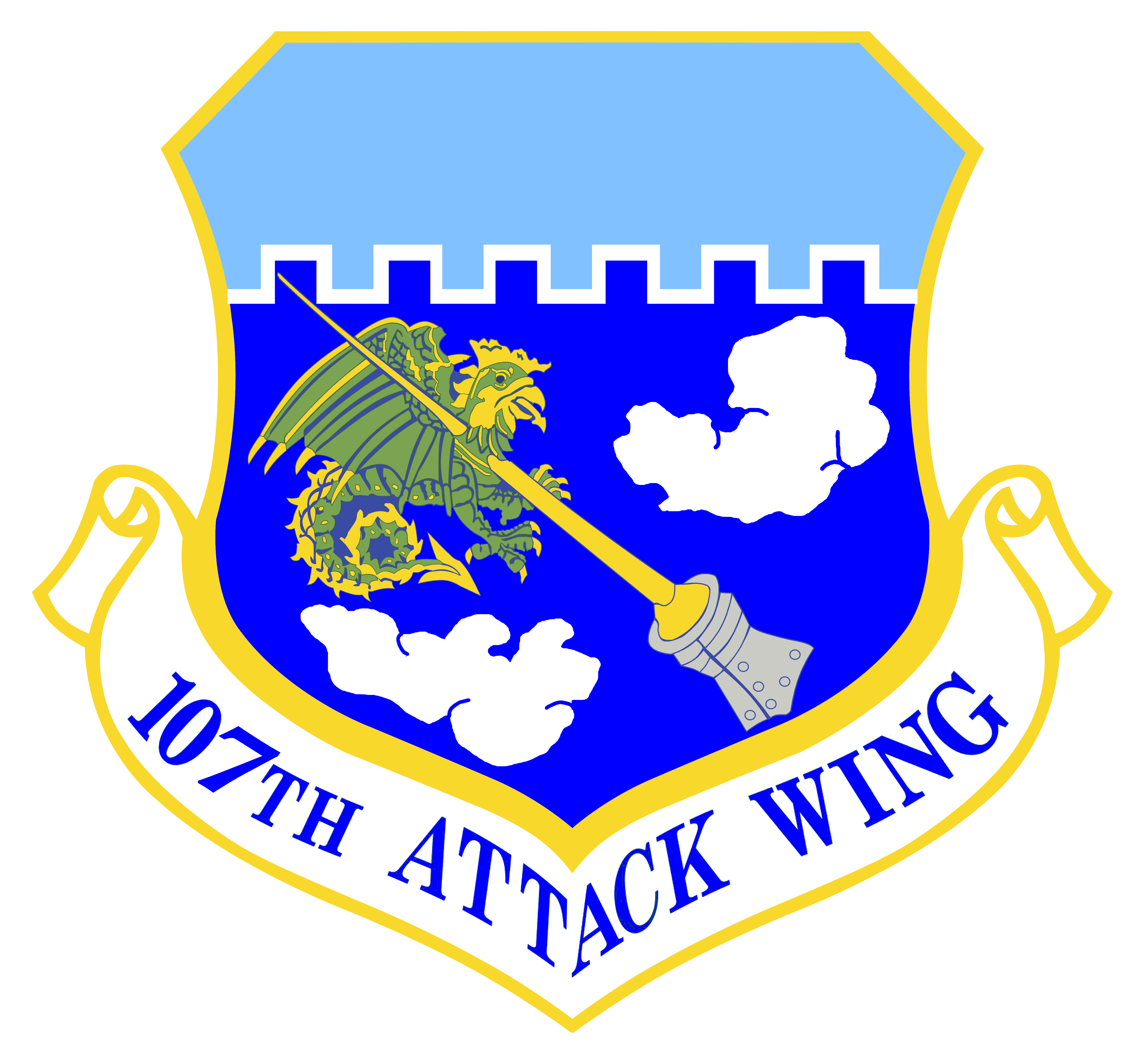
- 107th Attack Wing emblem
- Tail stripe: Blue, white "Niagara"

The 107th Attack Wing is a unit of the New York Air National Guard, stationed at Niagara Falls Air Reserve Station, New York. The 107th is equipped with the MQ-9 Reaper. If activated for federal service, the Wing is gained by the United States Air Force's Air Combat Command.

== Mission ==
The mission of the 107th Attack Wing is to provide "Global Vigilance and Strike Capability in support of federal authorities while maintaining the highest level of readiness for state contingencies." New York Air National Guard personnel carry out the unit's mission by providing surveillance and strike support, maintenance, supply, transportation, contracting, communications, civil engineering, personnel support, base services, security forces, and medical functions.

== History ==
=== World War II ===
The unit was formed at Hunter Field, Georgia, in August 1942 as the 339th Bombardment Group, a Third Air Force Operational Training Unit, equipped with Douglas A-24 Banshee dive bombers. Redesignated a fighter-bomber group in August 1943, the 339th moved to California in September 1943 as part of Desert Training Center in the Mojave Desert.

After the A-24 was taken out of combat service, it trained with Bell P-39 Airacobras and became combat ready, being reassigned to VIII Fighter Command in England, April 1944. Redesignated the 339th Fighter Group, with the 503rd, 504th and 505th Fighter Squadrons, it was based at RAF Fowlmere, England.

The group's combat destroyed 235 enemy aircraft and 440 on the ground during its one year of operations.

The group returned to the United States in October and was inactivated on 18 October 1945.

=== New York Air National Guard ===
The wartime 339th Fighter Group was redesignated the 107th Fighter Group, and was allotted to the National Guard on 24 May 1946. It was organized at Niagara Falls Municipal Airport, New York, and was extended federal recognition on 8 December 1948 and activated by the National Guard Bureau. It was assigned to the 52d Fighter Wing.

Due to its air defense commitment, the group's 136th Fighter-Interceptor Squadron was not mobilized during the 1991 Gulf Crisis. However, the 107th Fighter-Interceptor Group deployed firefighter and medical personnel as backfilled personnel to stateside bases vacated by active-duty personnel deployed to the Middle East.

In 1992, with the end of the Cold War, the 107th adopted the Air Force Objective Organization plan, and the unit was re-designated as the 107th Fighter Group. On 1 October 1995, in accordance with the Air Force "One Base - One Wing" policy, the 107th Fighter Wing was established and the 136th Fighter Squadron was assigned to the new 107th Operations Group.

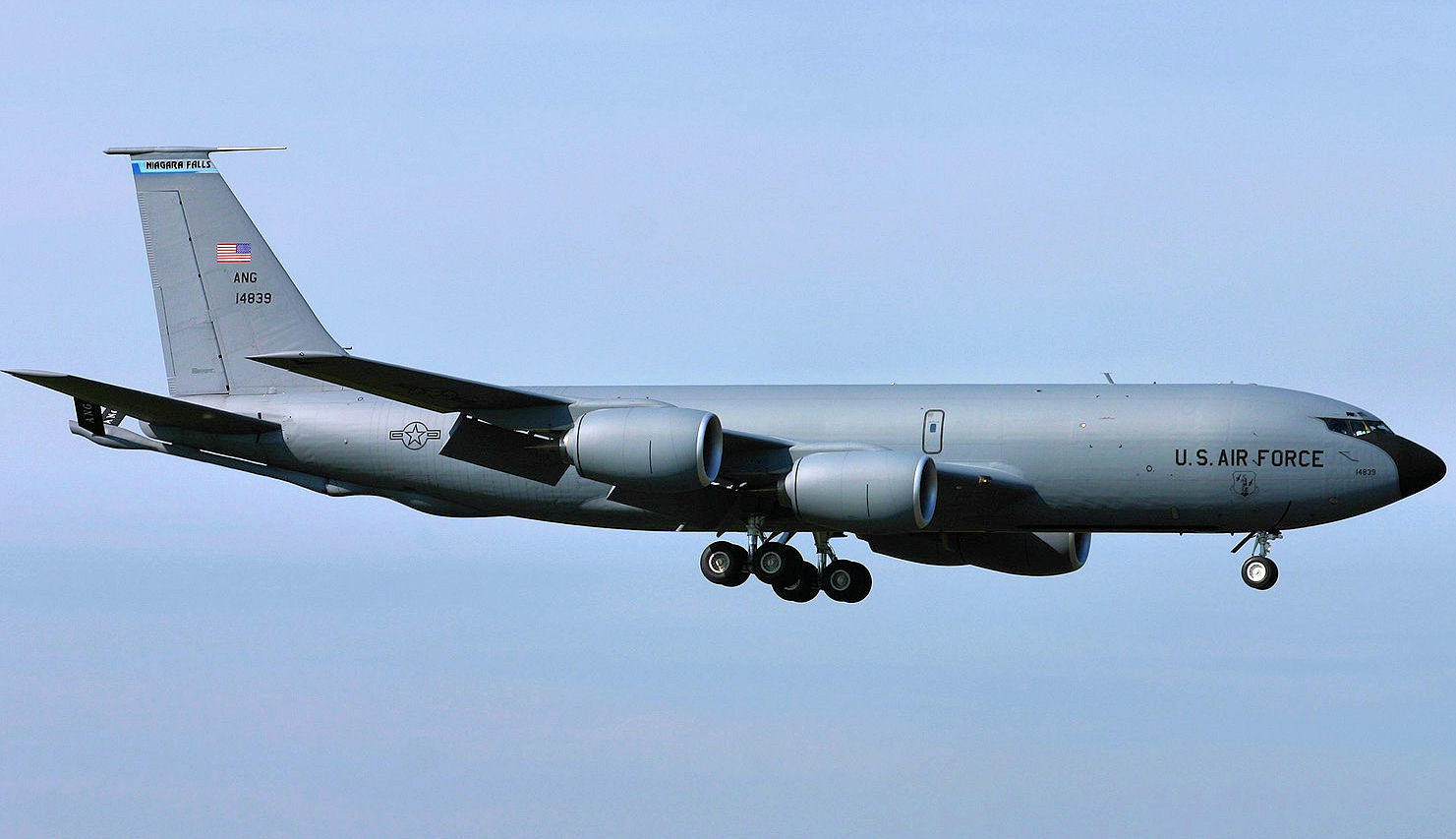
136th Air Refueling Squadron - Boeing KC-135R-BN Stratotanker 64-14839

With the arrival of the KC-135R Stratotanker in March 1994, the 107th Fighter Wing converted from an air defense to an aerial refueling mission and was re-designated as the 107th Air Refueling Wing. The wing also used the KC-135R as a cargo and passenger transport.

In mid-1996, the Air Force, in response to budget cuts, and changing world situations, began experimenting with Air Expeditionary organizations. The Air Expeditionary Force (AEF) concept was developed that would mix Active-Duty, Reserve and Air National Guard elements into a combined force. Instead of entire permanent units deploying as "Provisional" as in the 1991 Gulf War, Expeditionary units are composed of "aviation packages" from several wings, including active-duty Air Force, the Air Force Reserve Command and the Air National Guard, would be married together to carry out the assigned deployment rotation.

Since 1996, the 136th Expeditionary Air Refueling Squadron was formed and deployed in support of world contingencies including Operations to include, but not limited to, Strong Resolve 2002, Operation Uphold Democracy, Operation Deny Flight, Operation Decisive Endeavor, Operation Noble Eagle, Operation Enduring Freedom, Operation Iraqi Freedom and the Northeast Tanker Task Force.

In November 2007, the wing was notified that it would become an airlift unit. This was directed by the 2005 Base Realignment and Closure Commission decisions. It became an associate unit to the Air Force Reserve Command 914th Airlift Wing that was already based at Niagara Falls. The 914th Airlift Wing was transferred responsibility for the C-130H2 Hercules aircraft used by the 136th, and airmen from both units jointly operated them. With this change, the Niagara Falls Air Reserve Station received additional C-130 aircraft from the Tennessee ANG 118th Airlift Wing in Nashville. Tennessee. The 136th Expeditionary Airlift Squadron has deployed to both Iraq and Afghanistan in support of Operation Iraqi Freedom and Operation Enduring Freedom.

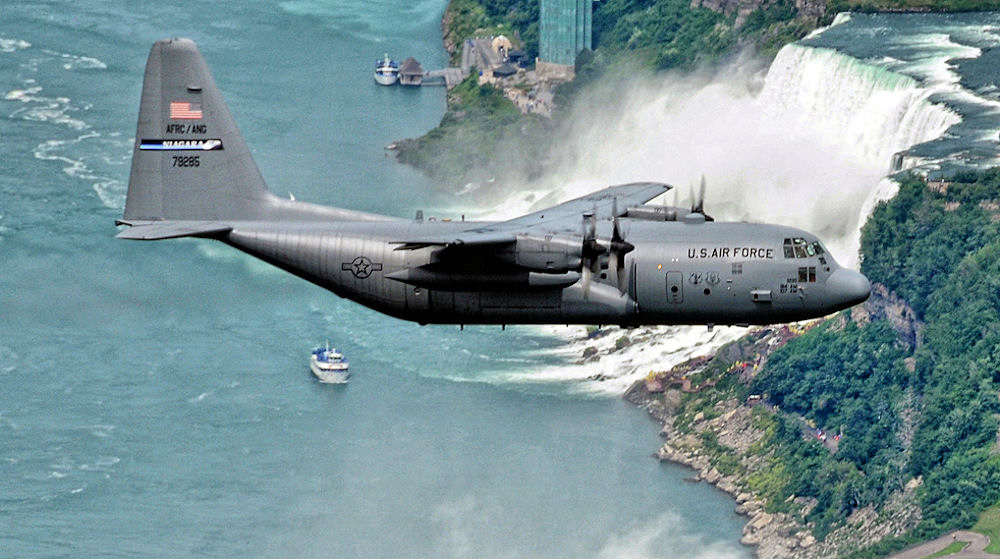
136th Airlift Squadron - Lockheed C-130H Hercules from the Niagara Falls Air Reserve Station flies over the Niagara Falls 24 June 2009

During Hurricane Sandy in late October 2012, members of the unit deployed to New York City and Long Island to assist in recovery operations. The unit was deployed first to Stewart Air National Guard Base in Newburgh and then traveled to Peekskill, which is in Westchester County. As part of the recovery effort, unit members performed road clearing, traffic control, helping displaced personnel with feeding and getting them back in their housing and getting them out of flood-stricken areas.

It was announced in early 2012 that federal budget reductions would affect the mission of the 107th Airlift Wing. During 2014 the 107th began transitioning to the MQ-9 Reaper unmanned aircraft mission from the C-130 mission, having flown the last C-130 flight in December 2015. The 107th was officially re-designated the 107th Attack Wing on 15 March 2017. As a result, the association between the 107th AW and the 914th AW of the Air Force Reserves, has ended and all C-130H2 aircraft transferred into sole possession of the 914th AW. The 107th is the second New York Air National Guard wing to assume the remotely piloted aircraft mission.

Major units of the 107th Attack Wing include:

- 107th Operations Group

136th Attack Squadron
274th Air Support Operations Squadron
222nd Command and Control Squadron

- 107th Mission Support Group
- 107th Medical Group

== Lineage ==
- Constituted as the 339th Bombardment Group (Dive) on 3 August 1942

Activated on 10 August 1942
Redesignated 339th Fighter-Bomber Group on 10 August 1943
Redesignated 339th Fighter Group on 30 May 1944
Inactivated on 18 October 1945

- Redesignated: 107th Fighter Group and allotted to the New York National Guard, on 24 May 1946.

Activated and received federal recognition and activated on 8 December 1948
Redesignated 107th Fighter-Interceptor Group on 1 October 1952
Redesignated 107th Fighter Group (Air Defense) on 1 May 1956
Redesignated 107th Tactical Fighter Group on 10 November 1958
Redesignated 107th Fighter-Interceptor Group on 1 June 1971
Redesignated 107th Fighter Group on 15 March 1992
Redesignated 107th Air Refueling Group on 16 July 1994

- Redesignated 107th Air Refueling Wing on 1 October 1995

Redesignated 107th Airlift Wing on 1 July 2008
Redesignated 107th Attack Wing on 15 March 2017

=== Assignments ===
- III Fighter Command, 10 August 1942
- IV Fighter Command, 1 September 1943
- 66th Fighter Wing, 4 April 1944

Attached to: 3d Bombardment (later Air) Division 15 September 1944 – October 1945

- 52d Fighter Wing, 8 December 1948
- 107th Fighter Wing, 1 November 1950
- New York Air National Guard

Gained by: Eastern Air Defense Force, Air Defense Command
Gained by: Tactical Air Command, 10 November 1958
Gained by: 21st Air Division, Aerospace Defense Command, 1 June 1971
Gained by: Air Defense, Tactical Air Command, 1 October 1979
Gained by: Northeast Air Defense Sector, 1 July 1987
Gained by: Air Mobility Command, 1 July 1994-present

=== Components ===
- 105th Fighter (Air Defense) (Later Tactical Fighter) Group, 1 May 1956 – 1 July 1962
- 107th Operations Group, 1 October 1995 – present
- 482d Bombardment (later 503d Fighter) Squadron (D7) 10 August 1942 – 18 October 1945

Redesignated 136th Fighter (later Fighter-Interceptor, Tactical Fighter, Fighter, Air Refueling, Airlift) Squadron, 8 December 1948-present

- 483d Bombardment (later 504th Fighter) Squadron (5Q) 10 August 1942 – 18 October 1945

Redesignated 137th Fighter (Later Fighter-Interceptor) Squadron, 28 October 1947 – 1 May 1956

- 484th Bombardment (later 505th Fighter) Squadron (6N) 10 August 1942 – 18 October 1945

Redesignated 138th Fighter (Later Fighter-Interceptor) Squadron, 28 October 1947--1 May 1956

- 139th Fighter (Later Fighter-Interceptor) Squadron, 28 October 1947 – 1 May 1956

=== Stations ===
- Hunter Field, Georgia, 10 August 1942
- Drew Field, Florida, February 1943
- Walterboro Army Airfield, South Carolina, July 1943
- Rice Army Airfield, California, 1 September 1943— March 1944
- RAF Fowlmere (AAF-378), England, 4 April 1944— October 1945
- Camp Kilmer, New Jersey, C. 16–18 October 1945
- Niagara Falls Municipal Airport, New York, 8 December 1948
- Hancock Field, Syracuse, New York, 1 December 1952
- Niagara Falls International Airport, – 30 June 1962
- Niagara Falls International Airport, 1 July 1985

Detachment operated from Charleston Air Force Base, South Carolina, July 1986 – June 1994
Designated: Niagara Falls Air Reserve Station, New York, 1991-present

=== Aircraft ===
- A-24 Banshee, 1942-1943
- P-39 Airacobra, 1943-1944
- P-51D Mustang, 1944-1945
- F-47D Thunderbolt, 1948-1952
- F-51H Mustang, 1952-1954
- F-94B Starfire, 1954-1957
- F-86H Sabre, 1957-1960
- F-100C Super Sabre, 1960-1971
- F-101B Voodoo, 1971-1982
- F-4C Phantom II, 1982-1986
- F-4D Phantom II, 1986-1990
- Block 15 ADF F-16A/B Fighting Falcon, 1990-1994
- KC-135R Stratotanker, 1994-2008
- C-130H Hercules, 2008–2015
- MQ-9 Reaper, 2014–present
