= National Reconnaissance Operations Center =

The United States' National Reconnaissance Operations Center (NROC) is the focal point for the National Reconnaissance Office's current operations and for time-sensitive space-borne intelligence reporting for the United States Intelligence Community (USIC). The NROC was created in response to the September 11th terrorist attacks.

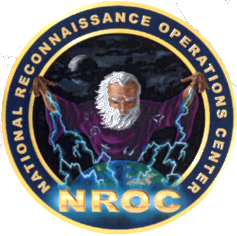
NROC logo

NROC serves as a back-up to the Joint Space Operations Center (JSpOC), located at Vandenberg AFB, California. New York's 222d Command and Control Squadron (222 CACS) provides personnel augmentation to NROC.

== See also ==
- 222d Command and Control Squadron (New York Air National Guard)
- Alternate National Military Command Center (ANMCC)
- Defense Special Missile & Astronautics Center (DEFSMAC)
- National Operations Center (NOC)
- National Military Command Center (NMCC)
- National SIGINT Operations Center (NSOC)
- Sentient (intelligence analysis system)
- Terrorist Threat Integration Center
- White House Situation Room
