= Tolicha Peak =

Mountain in Nevada, United States

Coordinates: 37°16′07″N 116°48′33″W

Tolicha Peak is a summit in the U.S. state of Nevada. The elevation is 6,870 feet (2,090 m).

Tolicha is a name derived from the Yokutsan languages.
