= Imperial Iranian Air Force Flight 48 =

1976 military aviation accident

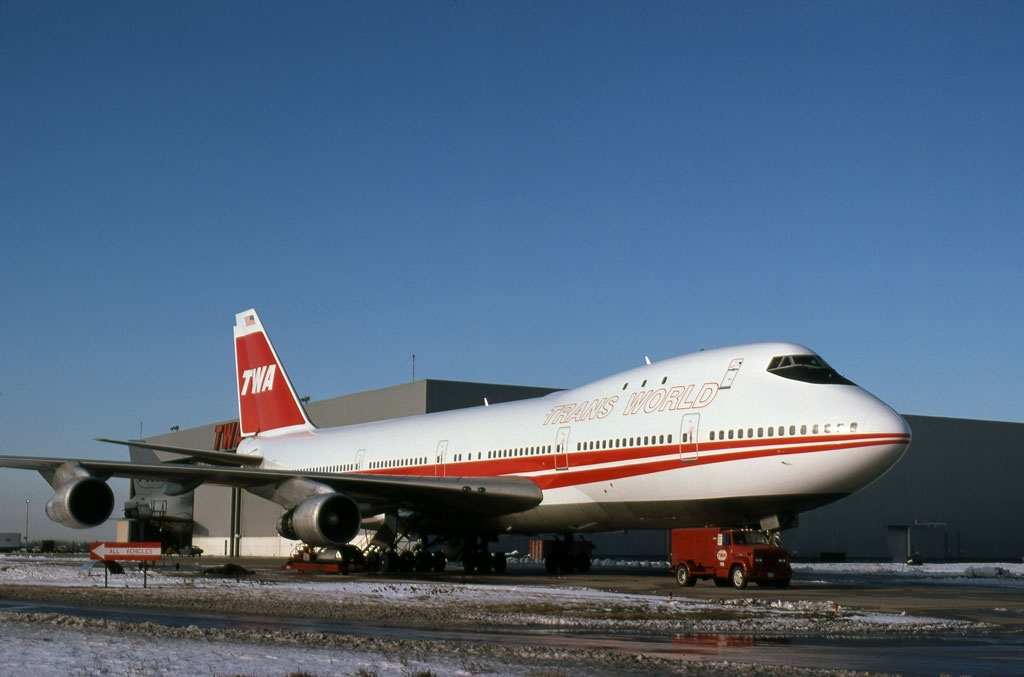
- The aircraft involved in the accident, pictured in 1974 while still in service with Trans World Airlines

Accident
- Date: May 9, 1976
- Summary: Fuel tank explosion caused by lightning strike; leading to separation of the left wing
- Site: Near Adolfo Suárez Madrid–Barajas Airport, Madrid, Spain

Aircraft
- Aircraft type: Boeing 747-131(SF)
- Operator: Imperial Iranian Air Force
- Registration: 5-283
- Flight origin: Tehran-Mehrabad Airport, Tehran, Iran
- Stopover: Madrid–Barajas Airport, Madrid, Spain
- Destination: McGuire Air Force Base, New Jersey, United States
- Occupants: 17
- Passengers: 7
- Crew: 10
- Fatalities: 17
- Survivors: 0

Imperial Iranian Air Force Flight 48 was a military cargo flight from Tehran, Iran, to McGuire Air Force Base in the United States with a stopover in Madrid, Spain. On May 9, 1976, the Boeing 747 freighter operating the flight crashed during its approach to Madrid, killing all 17 people on board.

== Aircraft ==
The aircraft involved was a five year old Boeing 747-131 registered as 5-283 with serial number 19677 and line number 73. The aircraft was powered by four Pratt & Whitney JT9D-3B turbofan engines.

The aircraft's last maintenance check was performed by the Imperial Iranian Air Force on May 4, 1976, after which it flew for 16 hours. During the subsequent investigation, it would be determined that American specialists were unaware of the check's results.

== Accident ==
Flight ULF48 took off from Mehrabad airport in Tehran at 08:20 UTC bound for New Jersey, via Madrid. (Note: Times are expressed in Coordinated Universal Time (UTC).) There were 10 crew members and seven passengers on board. The aircraft climbed to flight level FL330, approximately 33,000 feet (10,000 m). At take off, the aircraft's weight was 276,827 kilograms (610,299 lb), including 115,500 kilograms (254,600 lb) of fuel. The fuel was a mixture of type JP-4 and Jet-A. The aircraft's weight and center of gravity were within required limits.

At 14:15, Flight 48 contacted the Madrid Air Route Traffic Control Center and reported that the estimated landing time would be 14:40. At 14:19, the Madrid ARTCC controller told the flight that they were identified on radar and cleared the flight to descend via the CPL VOR and the Castejon radio beacon. At 14:22, the crew received the weather conditions at the airport; at 14:25, they were cleared to descend to FL100. The crew acknowledged and began descent.

A cyclone had passed over Spain earlier in the day, along with strong thunderstorms. However, visibility was good, and no dangerous weather alerts were issued by the weather service. At 14:30, the crew diverted to the left of their assigned route due to bad weather. At 14:32, the Madrid ARTCC controller cleared the flight to descend to 5,000 ft (1,500 m) and contact Madrid approach. At 14:33, the crew contacted Madrid approach and reported more bad weather ahead, subsequently requesting to deviate away from it.

The approach controller reported that he had established radar contact, and then asked the crew to confirm their instructions. The crew confirmed, and reported passing the Castejon radio beacon. The controller instructed them to maintain a heading of 260°. The crew acknowledged the transmission and reported their descent to 5,000 ft (1,500 m). This was the last transmission from Flight ULF48.

At the same time, south of the town of Valdemoro, locals noticed the aircraft flying at around 6,000 feet (1,800 m) on a 220° heading. The crew was aware that they were flying into poor weather conditions, but none of them expressed any concern until 14:34, when a crew member said, "We're in the soup!" Three seconds later, two witnesses on the ground reported seeing lightning strike the aircraft, followed by an explosion on the left wing near engine #1 (outer left). The left wing exploded into three large parts, and then disintegrated into 15 fragments.

At this time, the Flight Data Recorder stopped recording, but the Cockpit Voice Recorder continued to record. The autopilot disconnect warning was then heard. Unaware of the loss of the left wing, the crew tried to regain control of the crippled aircraft in vain. The aircraft dove rapidly and it crashed onto a farm at a height 3,000 ft (900 m) above sea level at 14:35 (15:35 local time), 54 seconds after the moment of the lightning strike. All 17 people on board were killed and the aircraft was destroyed.

== Investigation ==
The Imperial Iranian Air Force and the United States National Transportation Safety Board investigated the accident.

The Spanish government gave the Iranian government the primary responsibility to investigate, and the NTSB also successfully argued that it should help investigating as the aircraft type originated from the US.

It was established that a bolt of lightning struck the fuselage near the cockpit and exited the left wing's static discharger located at the wingtip. This created a spark in fuel tank number 1 (which contained 11,200 kg (24,700 lb) fuel), igniting fuel vapor in the tank. The blast wave from the explosion, at more than 550 kPa (80 psi), caused the tank walls to collapse.

It is most likely that the ignition spark originated from an open circuit in a fuel valve's wiring. The explosion led to part of the wing trim separating and damage to the side members; as a result, the air flow deteriorated sharply and the wings began to bend significantly. As the flight was passing through an area of turbulence at high speed, the wing experienced major mechanical stress. The entire left wing separated just seconds later.

The NTSB could not determine if the wing separated due to the explosion or the stress.

== See also ==
Similar accidents

- TWA Flight 891 – lightning strike
- Pan Am Flight 214 – lightning strike and fuel tank explosion
- LANSA Flight 508 – lightning strike
- TWA Flight 800 – fuel tank explosion
