= Flight 48 =

Flight 48 may refer to:

- CATC Flight 48, crashed on 25 December 1946
- Imperial Iranian Air Force Flight 48, crashed on 9 May 1976
