= Flight 214 =

Flight 214 may refer to:

Listed chronologically

- Aeroflot Flight 214, an Ilyushin Il-14 that crashed on 6 August 1955 in Russia
- Pan Am Flight 214, a Boeing 707-121 that crashed on 8 December 1963 in Maryland, U.S.
- Asiana Airlines Flight 214, a Boeing 777-200ER that crash-landed on 6 July 2013 in California, U.S.
