= 332d Fighter-Interceptor Squadron =

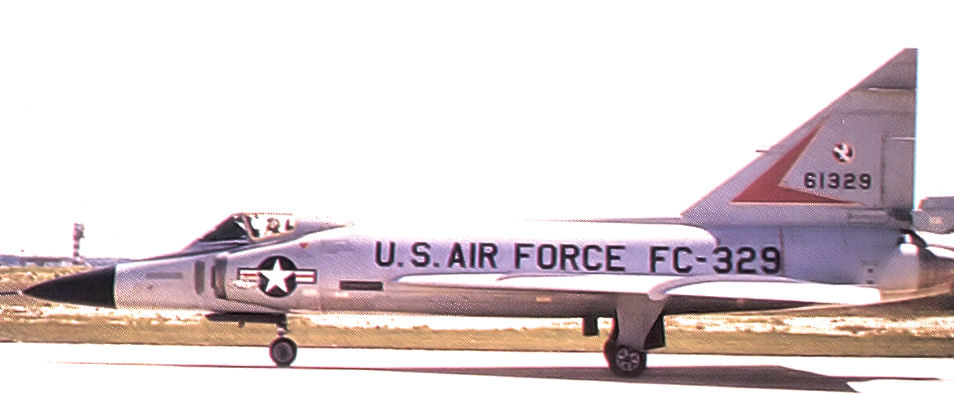
- 332d Fighter-Interceptor Squadron F-102A Delta Dagger (Note: Aircraft is Convair F-102A-75-CO Delta Dagger, serial 56-1329, taken at McGuire AFB)
- Active: 1942–1944; 1953–1965
- Country: United States
- Branch: United States Air Force
- Role: Fighter interceptor
- Engagements: American Theater World War II

- Decorations: Air Force Outstanding Unit Award

Insignia
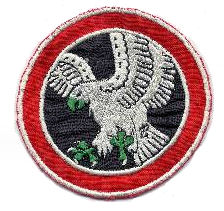
- Patch with 332d Fighter-Interceptor Squadron emblem (Note: Approved 29 February 1956. Description: On a black disc, a white eagle, with yellow beak and feet, white talons and red tongue, all detail black; the eagle in flight with wings elevated and feet raised in striking position, the disc edged of the second [color mentioned] and bordered red.)

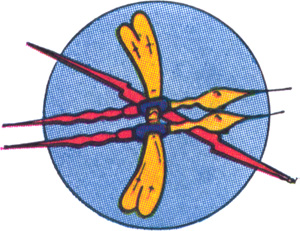
- World War II 332d Fighter Squadron emblem

The 332d Fighter-Interceptor Squadron is an inactive United States Air Force unit. Its last assignment was with the 4683rd Air Defense Wing at Thule Air Base, Greenland, where it was inactivated on 31 May 1965.

The squadron was first organized during World War II as the 332d Fighter Squadron. It trained fighter pilots until March 1944 when it was disbanded in a reorganization of the Army Air Forces' training and support units. The squadron was again organized in 1953 as an air defense organization. It moved to Greenland in 1960.

== History ==
=== World War II ===
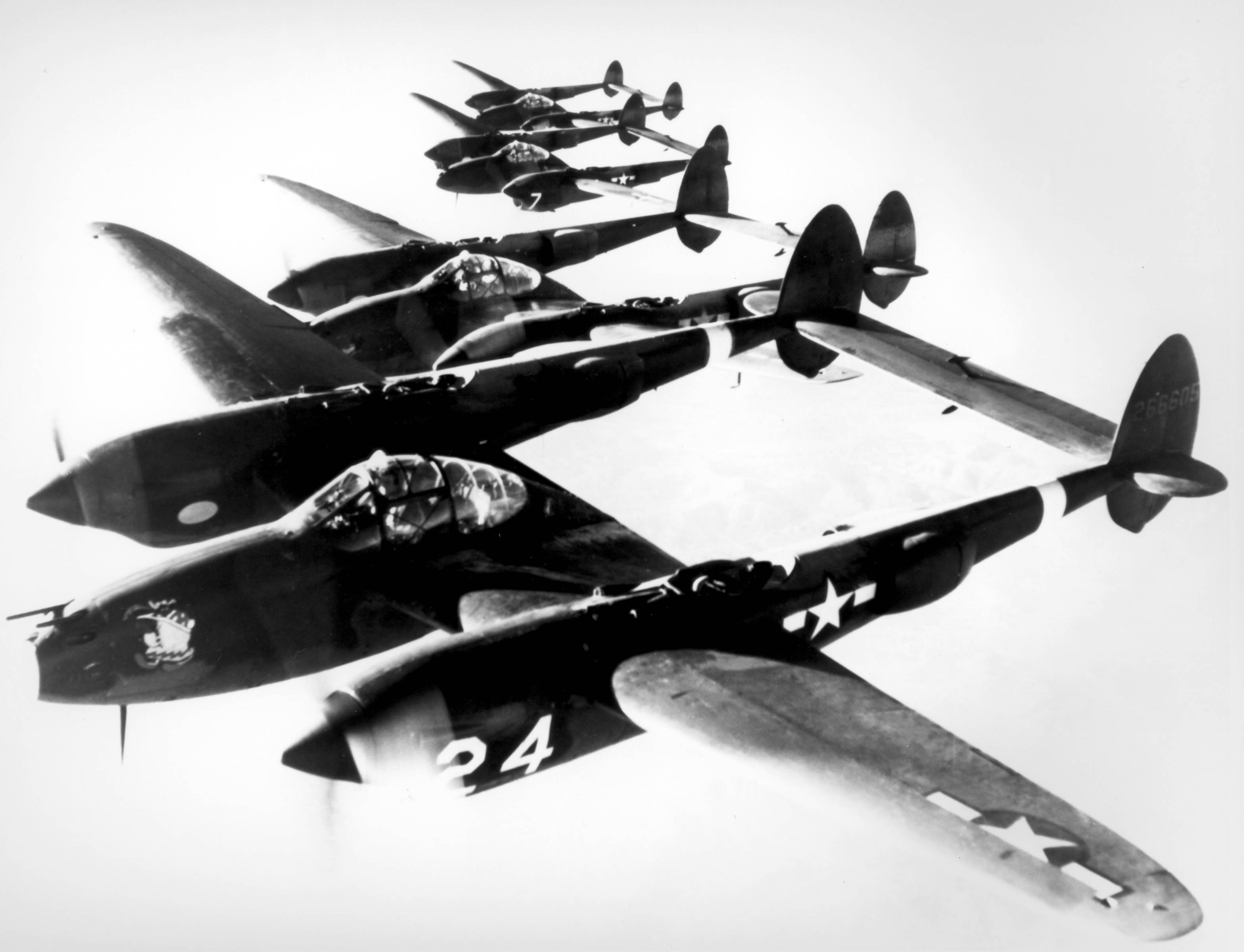
Formation of P-38 Lightnings

The squadron was first activated at Hamilton Field, California in July 1942 as one of the three original squadrons of the 329th Fighter Group. Four days after its activation, the squadron moved to Paine Field, Washington and equipped with Lockheed P-38 Lightnings. The squadron initially acted as an Operational Training Unit (OTU). The OTU program involved establishing an oversized parent unit which would provide cadres to organize "satellite groups." The 332d also served as a Replacement Training Unit, training Lightning pilots in the final phases of fighter pilot training before shipping overseas.

In September 1942 the 329th Group headquarters moved to Grand Central Air Terminal, California, while the 332d moved to Santa Ana Army Air Base. Most of the group eventually found itself at Ontario Army Air Field, California. The squadrons moved there in 1943, and were joined the other squadrons later that year, while group headquarters moved in February 1944. The squadron was disbanded in 1944 as part of an Army Air Forces (AAF) reorganization in which units not programmed to deploy overseas were replaced by AAF Base Units in order to free up manpower for overseas assignment because standard military units, based on relatively inflexible tables of organization were not proving well adapted to the training mission. Accordingly, a more functional system was adopted in which each AAF base was organized into a separate numbered unit.

=== Cold war air defense ===
The squadron was reconstituted, redesignated the 332d Fighter-Interceptor Squadron and activated at New Castle County Airport, Delaware in March 1953 as the second squadron of the 525th Air Defense Group. It was equipped with Lockheed F-94C Starfires armed with Mighty Mouse Rockets rather than the cannons of its sister squadron's F-94B Starfires. It continued in the air defense role at New Castle until August 1955, when its personnel and Starfires were transferred to the 97th Fighter-Interceptor Squadron as part of Air Defense Command's Project Arrow, which was designed to bring back on the active list the fighter units which had compiled memorable records in the two world wars.

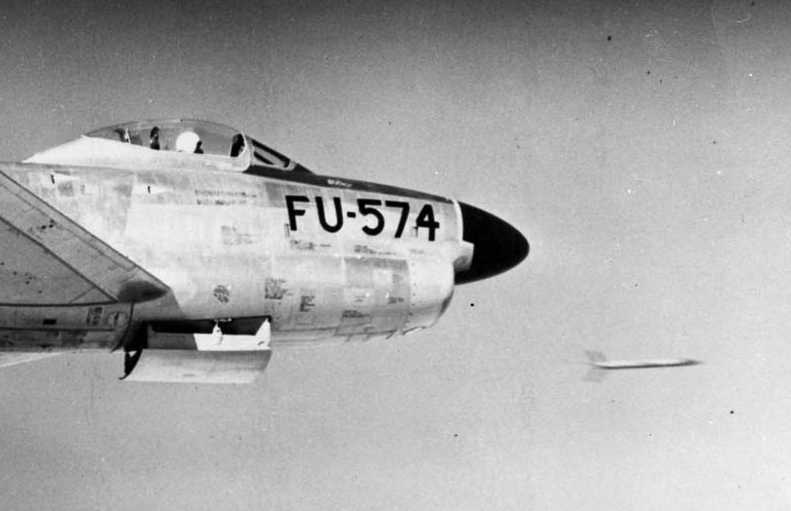
F-86D firing a Mighty Mouse rocket

Project Arrow did not see the end of the 332d. Instead, it moved on paper to McGuire Air Force Base, New Jersey, where it took over the personnel and North American F-86D Sabres of the 2d Fighter-Interceptor Squadron (Note: The 2d moved to Suffolk County Air Force Base to join its World War II headquarters in another Project Arrow move. Maurer, Combat Squadrons, 14.) At McGuire, the squadron was assigned to the 4709th Air Defense Wing until the implementation of the Semi-Automatic Ground Environment (SAGE) air defense system. The 4621st Air Defense Wing (SAGE) was organized at McGuire in the Spring of 1956 and attached to the 4709th Wing until the 4621st Wing assumed the mission of the 4709th wing in October 1956. As SAGE became operational, the squadron upgraded its Sabres to the F-86L model, which was equipped with data link for interception control through the SAGE system.

In July 1959, the squadron moved to England Air Force Base, Louisiana, where it began to train with Convair F-102 Delta Daggers, which were armed with AIM-4 Falcons. A little more than a year later, the unit moved to Thule Air Base, Greenland, where it resumed the air defense mission that had been carried out at Thule until March 1960 by the 327th Fighter-Interceptor Squadron. The squadron was inactivated in 1965, when the air defense mission at Thule became one of surveillance.

== Lineage ==
- Constituted as the 332d Fighter Squadron (Twin Engine) on 24 June 1942

Activated on 10 July 1942
Disbanded on 31 March 1944

- Reconstituted and redesignated 332d Fighter-Interceptor Squadron on 11 February 1953

Activated on 27 March 1953
Inactivated on 31 May 1965

=== Assignments ===
- 329th Fighter Group, 10 July 1942 – 31 March 1944
- 525th Air Defense Group, 27 March 1953
- 4709th Air Defense Wing, 18 August 1955
- 4621st Air Defense Wing (later New York Air Defense Sector), 1 October 1956
- 4730th Air Defense Group, 8 February 1957
- 33rd Air Division, 10 July 1959
- Oklahoma City Air Defense Sector, 1 January 1960
- 4683rd Air Defense Wing, 1 September 1960 – 31 May 1965

=== Stations ===
- Hamilton Field, California, 10 July 1942
- Paine Field, Washington, 14 July 1942
- Santa Ana Army Air Base, California, 10 September 1942
- Ontario Army Air Field, California, 28 August 1943
- Santa Ana Army Air Base, California, 7 October 1943 – 31 March 1944
- New Castle County Airport, Delaware, 27 March 1953
- McGuire Air Force Base, New Jersey, 18 August 1955
- England Air Force Base, Louisiana, 10 July 1959
- Thule Air Base, Greenland, 1 September 1960 – 31 May 1965

=== Aircraft ===
- Lockheed P-38 Lightning, 1942–1944
- Lockheed F-94C Starfire, 1953–1955
- North American F-86D Sabre, 1955–1957
- North American F-86L Sabre, 1957–1959
- Convair F-102 Delta Dagger, 1959-1965
