= Twenty-First Air Force =

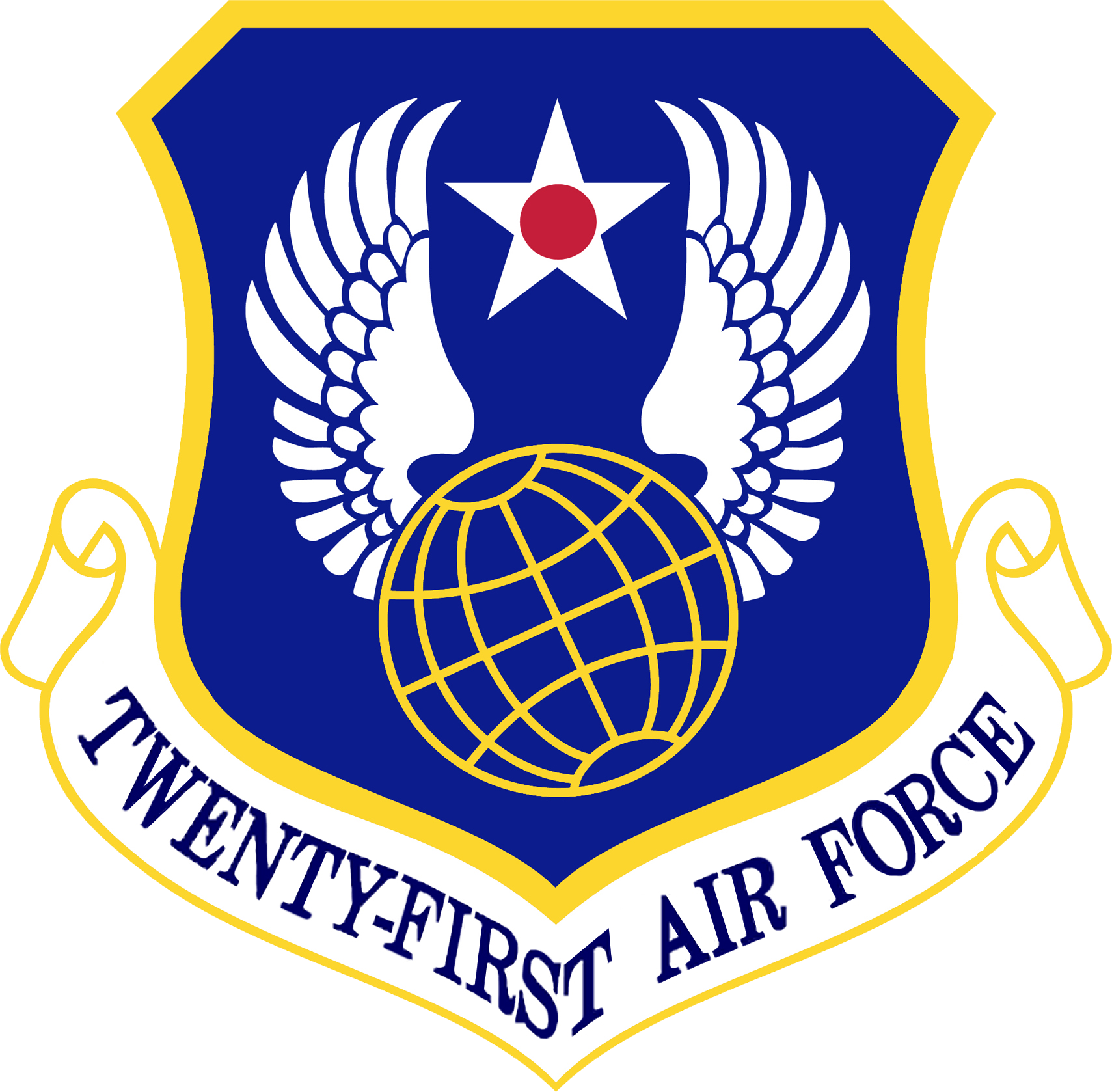
- Shield of the Twenty-First Air Force
- Active: 1942–2012; 2025–present; (69 years, 9 months)
- Country: United States
- Branch: United States Air Force
- Part of: Air Mobility Command
- Engagements: World War II – American Theater

- Decorations: Air Force Outstanding Unit Award (19x)

Insignia
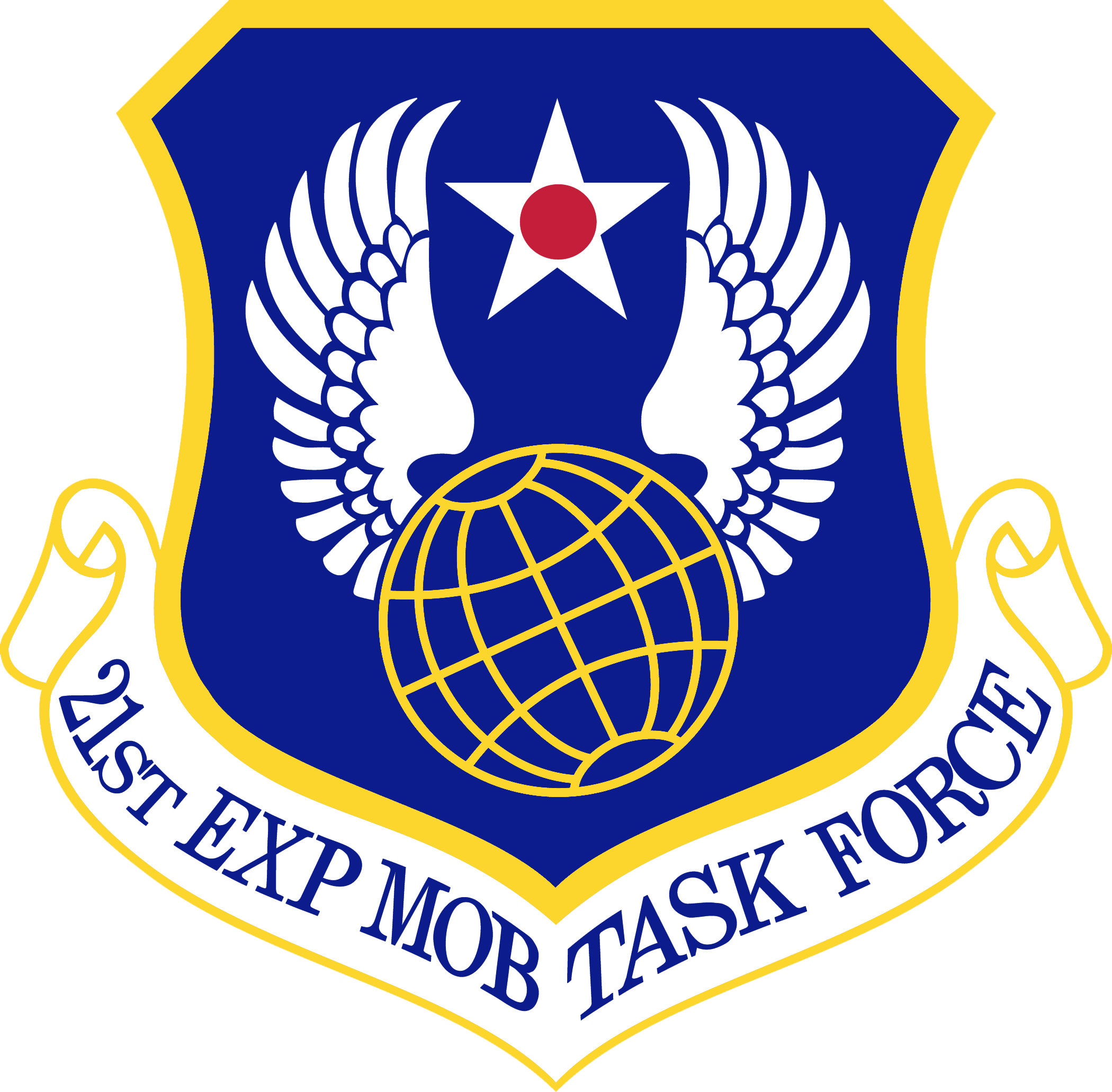
- 21st Expeditionary Mobility Task Force emblem

The Twenty-First Air Force is an active numbered air force of the United States Air Force. It was reactivated on 5 September 2025, during a ceremony hosted at the McGuire AFB entity of Joint Base McGuire-Dix-Lakehurst. It had been inactive since 2003, when it was previously designated as the 21st Expeditionary Mobility Task Force, headquartered at the McGuire AFB entity of Joint Base McGuire–Dix–Lakehurst until its inactivation in 2012. In this capacity, it was subordinate to Air Mobility Command's Eighteenth Air Force.

First created as a wing of the United States Army Air Forces during World War II, the unit initially ferried aircraft, but its mission soon changed to airlifting personnel and cargo.

The organization was redesignated several times, eventually becoming the Twenty-First Air Force in 1966.

In 2003, the unit was redesignated as the 21st Expeditionary Mobility Task Force, assuming responsibility for worldwide airlift operations in support of United States Joint Forces Command, United States European Command, and United States Central Command.

In 2012, the organization was inactivated, with its subordinate units and responsibilities being transferred to the United States Air Force Expeditionary Center.

== Mission ==
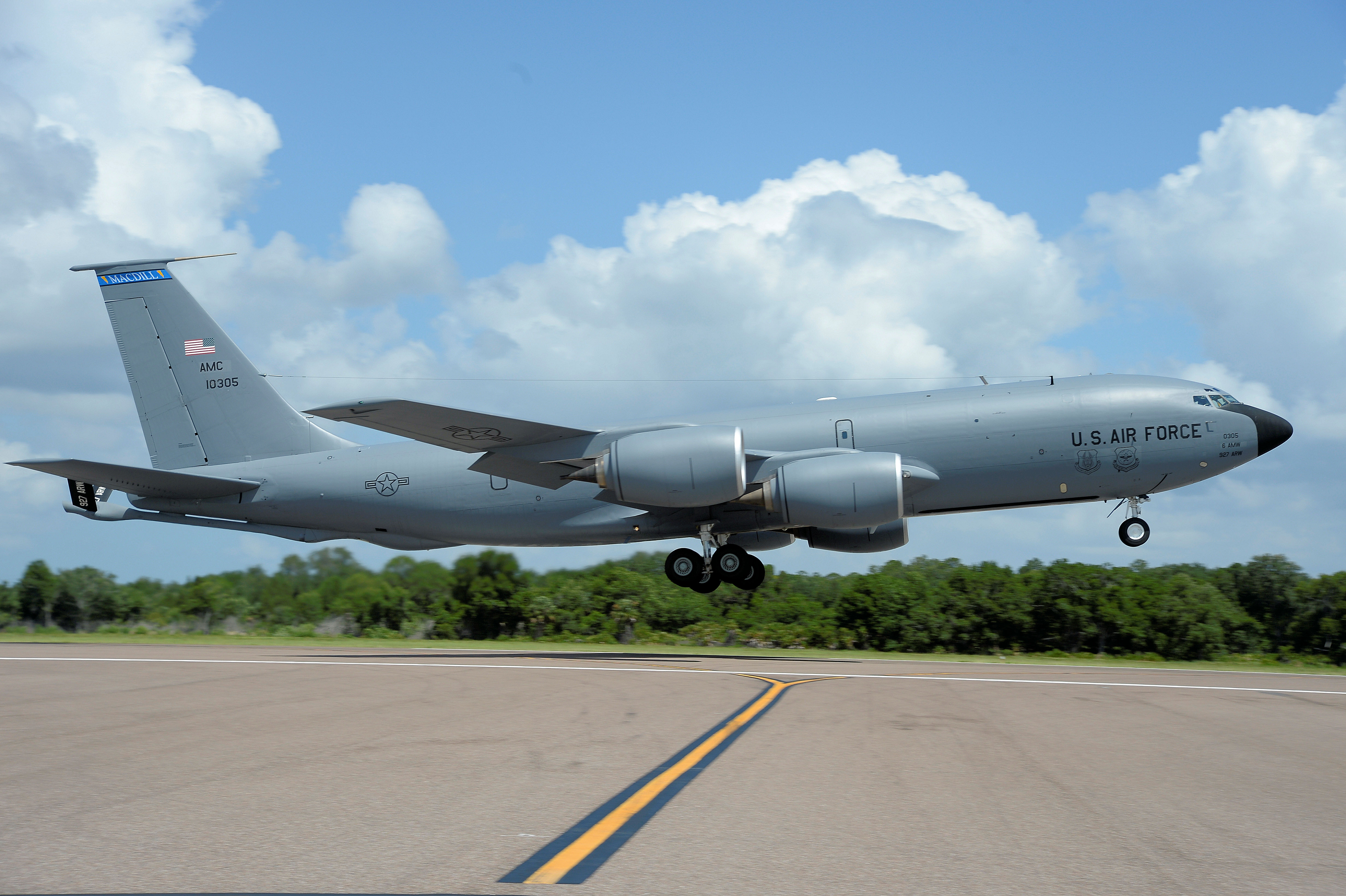
A 6th Air Mobility Wing KC-135 Stratotanker takes off from the flightline at MacDill Air Force Base, Florida.

The 21st Expeditionary Mobility Task Force (EMTF) provided a rapid, tailored, worldwide, air mobility response to combatant commander's needs. Reporting through Eighteenth Air Force, the EMTF extended existing AMC infrastructure, through both en route employment and rapid forward deployment capabilities.

Its mission was to command and assess the combat readiness of assigned air mobility forces over the Atlantic half of the globe in support of Global Reach. These forces were at more than 55 locations in eight countries. 21 EMTF's major units included six active duty wings, two operational flying groups, and two mobility operations/support groups. Additionally, the 21 EMTF was liaison to 40 Air Reserve Component Wings.

21 EMTF's strategic airlift force included the C-5 Galaxy, C-17 Globemaster III and the C-130 Hercules, aircraft, used to move cargo and passengers worldwide. The tanker force included KC-10 Extenders and KC-135 Stratotankers used for inflight refueling to provide increased global mobility.

In addition to the Task Force's airlift and refueling mission, the 89th Airlift Wing at Andrews Air Force Base, Maryland provided worldwide administrative airlift support to the President of the United States and other top government officials flying the C-20, C-21, C-32, VC-25 (Air Force One), VC-137, and UH-1 aircraft.

== Units ==
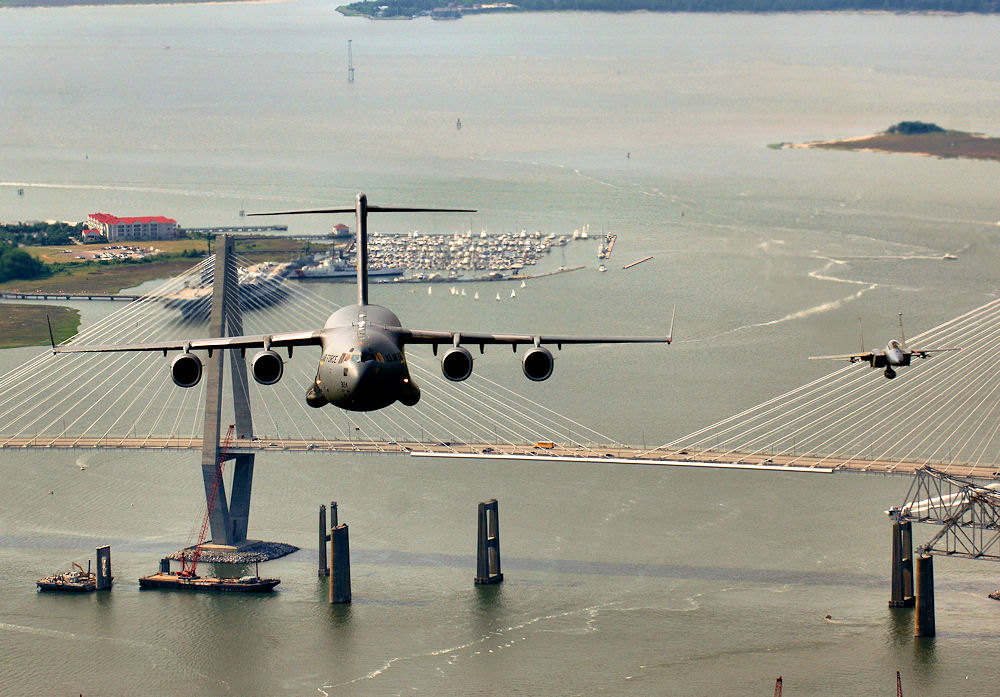
A 315th Airlift Wing C-17 Globemaster II flying over the new Arthur Ravenel Jr. Bridge, Charleston Harbor, South Carolina.

- 6th Air Refueling Wing

MacDill Air Force Base, Florida

- 19th Airlift Wing

Little Rock Air Force Base, Arkansas

- 43rd Air Mobility Operations Group

Pope Field, North Carolina

- 87th Air Base Wing

McGuire AFB, Joint Base McGuire–Dix–Lakehurst, New Jersey

- 305th Air Mobility Wing

McGuire AFB, Joint Base McGuire–Dix–Lakehurst, New Jersey

- 436th Airlift Wing

Dover Air Force Base, Delaware

- 437th Airlift Wing

Charleston AFB, Joint Base Charleston, South Carolina

- 521st Air Mobility Operations Wing

Ramstein Air Base, Germany

- 621st Contingency Response Wing

McGuire AFB, Joint Base McGuire–Dix–Lakehurst, New Jersey

- 628th Air Base Wing

Charleston AFB, Joint Base Charleston, South Carolina

== History ==
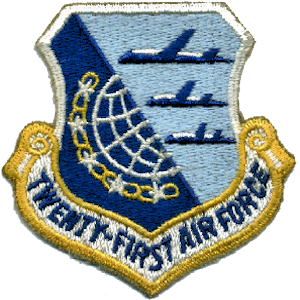
1966 emblem of the Twenty-First Air Force, based on the MATS Eastern Transport Air Force emblem

The organization was first established in June 1942 as the 23rd Army Air Forces Ferry Wing, ferrying aircraft before changing missions to airlift personnel and cargo the next month.

Under Military Air Transport Service, Eastern Transport Air Force (EASTAF), headquartered at McGuire AFB, New Jersey, controlled all strategic airlift operations between the Mississippi River and the east coast of Africa and in Central and South America.

When MATS became Military Airlift Command, EASTAF was redesignated Twenty-First Air Force, with the same area of responsibility. In addition to Dover AFB, other major 21st AF bases were Charleston AFB, South Carolina and McGuire AFB, NJ. Depending upon command organization at different times, airlift and airlift support units in Europe, the Azores, Bermuda and throughout the southeastern United States also reported to EASTAF or 21st AF.

In October 1983 Charleston AFB Security Police Airbase Ground Defense Team conducted security operations in Grenada (Operation Urgent Fury) at Point Salinas Airport. In Operation Just Cause, Twenty-first Air Force units conducted the largest night airdrop since World War II, leading to the successful seizure of Panama. From August 1990, Twenty-first Air Force controlled the largest airlift in history, moving forces for Operation Desert Shield and, later, Operation Desert Storm. Later in the decade Twenty-First Air Force was involved in operations in Bosnia and repeated deployments to the Middle East directed against Iraq.

The command also supported peaceful, humanitarian missions. Twenty-first Air Force units flew relief missions after Hurricane Hugo (1989) and Andrew (1992), earthquakes in Armenia and San Francisco, and many other natural disasters. In addition, it controlled the Operation Provide Comfort airlift missions to the Kurds following the Persian Gulf War, the Operation Provide Hope airlift in the aftermath of the collapse of the Soviet Union, and participated in Operation Restore Hope, the humanitarian airlift of food and supplies into Somalia.

The ETF supported numerous exercises around the world, one of which was CENTRAZBAT, in which C-17's flew multi-national paratroopers non-stop from Pope AFB, North Carolina, airdropping them directly into the Central Asian countries of Uzbekistan and Kazakhstan demonstrating the capabilities of direct delivery. The command could operate in remote, often austere locations throughout Europe, Africa, and South America.

On 1 October 2003, the 21st Air Force was redesignated as the 21st Expeditionary Mobility Task Force and given a new mission set as a component of the Eighteenth Air Force. In this capacity, the organization supported United States Joint Forces Command, United States European Command, and United States Central Command.

The 21st Expeditionary Mobility Task Force was inactivated on 19 March 2012, with its responsibilities and subordinate units being transferred to the United States Air Force Expeditionary Center.

== Lineage ==
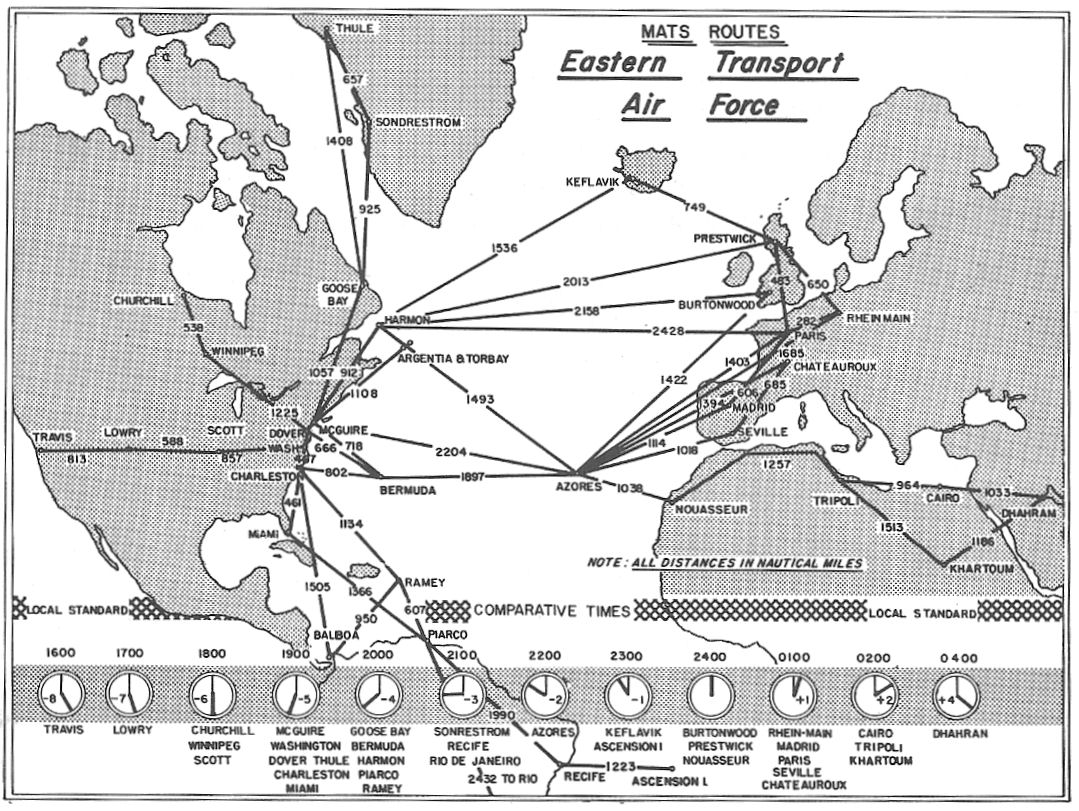
Routes of the Eastern Transport Air Force, 1964

- Established as the 23rd Army Air Forces Ferrying Wing on 12 June 1942

Activated on 18 June 1942
Redesignated North Atlantic Wing, Air Transport Command on 5 July 1942
Redesignated North Atlantic Division, Air Transport Command on 27 June 1944
Redesignated Atlantic Division, Air Transport Command on 20 September 1945
Redesignated Atlantic Division, Military Air Transport Service on 1 June 1948
Redesignated Eastern Transport Air Force on 1 July 1958
Redesignated Twenty-First Air Force on 3 January 1966
Redesignated 21st Expeditionary Mobility Task Force on 1 October 2003
Inactivated on 19 March 2012
Redesignated Twenty-First Air Force on 30 March 2012
Reactivated on 05 September 2025

=== Assignments ===
- AAF Ferrying Command, 12 June 1942
- Air Transport Command, 5 July 1942
- Air Transport Service (USAF), 15 October 1947
- Military Air Transport Service, 1 June 1948
- Military Airlift Command, 1 January 1966
- Air Mobility Command, 1 June 1992
- Eighteenth Air Force, 1 October 2003
- Air Mobility Command, 5 September 2025

=== Major components ===
- 76th Air Division, 1 March 1976 – 30 September 1977; 15 December 1980 – 1 October 1985
- 322nd Air (later, Airlift) Division, 3 January 1966 – 24 December 1968; 23 June 1978 – 1 April 1992
- 839th Air Division, 1–31 December 1974
- 621st Contingency Response Wing, 22 July 1994 – 19 March 2012
- 362d Airlift Support Group (Rhein-Main, 1992-1994)
- 721st Air Mobility Operations Group, 1 April 1994 – 4 September 2008
- 521st Air Mobility Operations Wing, 4 September 2008 – 19 March 2012

=== Stations ===
- Presque Isle AAF, Maine, 12 June 1942
- Fort Totten, New York, 20 September 1945
- Westover AAF (later, AFB), Massachusetts, 1 October 1947
- McGuire AFB, New Jersey, 1 June 1955
