= 621st Contingency Response Wing =

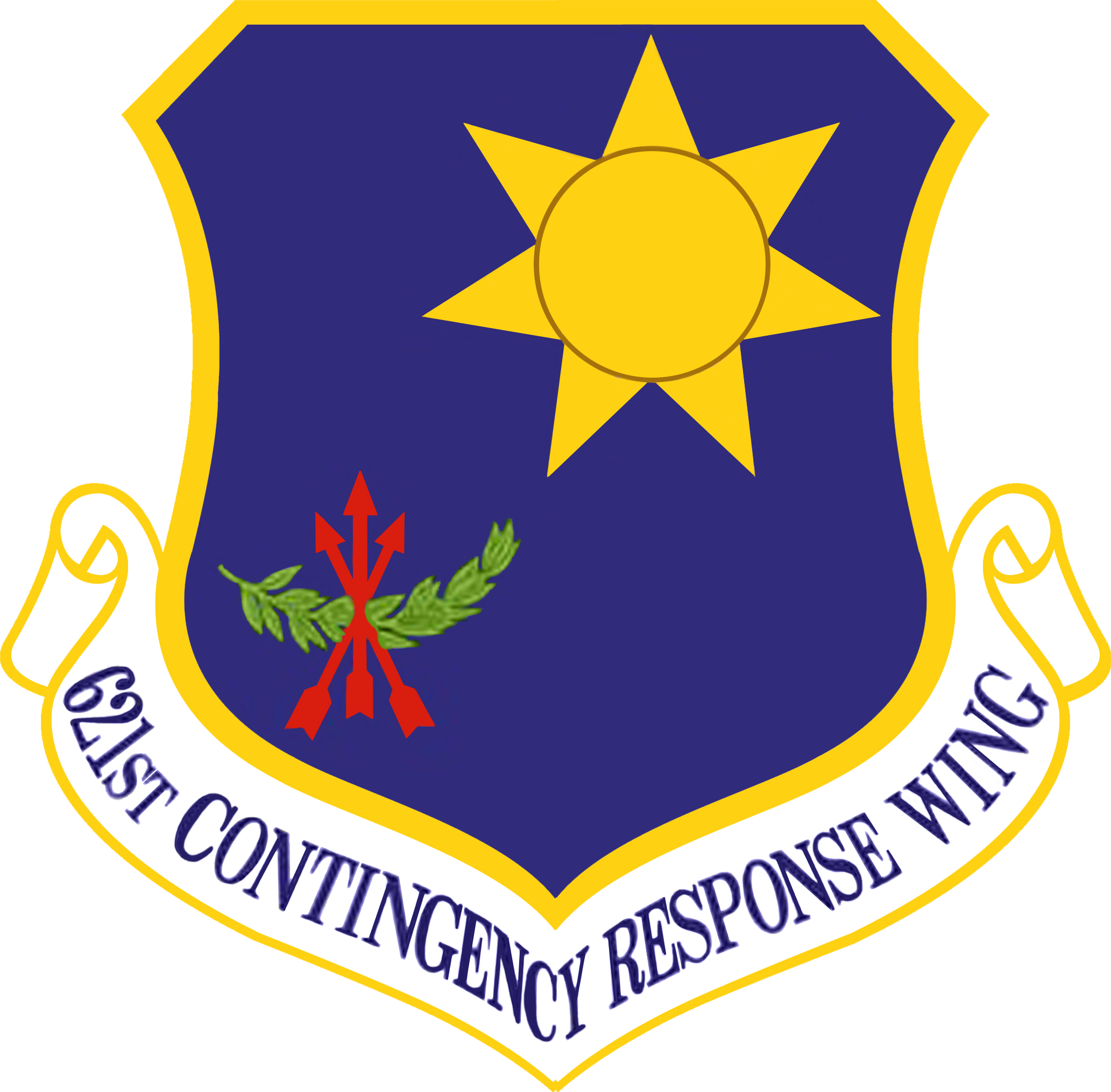
- 621st Contingency Response Wing emblem
- Active: 1994–present
- Country: United States of America
- Branch: United States Air Force
- Type: Rapid Mobility, Contingency Response, Initial Airbase Holding
- Size: 1500 military and civilian personnel
- Part of: Air Mobility Command
- Garrison/HQ: McGuire Air Force Base
- Nickname: "The Devil Raiders"
- Engagements: War on terror: Operation Enduring Freedom; Operation Iraqi Freedom; Operation Inherent Resolve; Operation Unified Response

Commanders
- Current commander: Colonel Justin D. Ballinger

The 621st Contingency Response Wing is a United States Air Force rapid response wing, based at Joint Base McGuire-Dix-Lakehurst, New Jersey. It specializes in the training and deployment of personnel globally to open airfields. The wing establishes, expands, sustains, and coordinates air mobility operations during contingency operations.

It consists of approximately 1,500 airmen in three groups, 13 squadrons, and more than 20 geographically separated operating locations aligned with major Army and Marine Corps combat units. Two contingency response groups (the 621st Contingency Response Group at Joint Base McGuire-Dix-Lakehurst, New Jersey and the 821st Contingency Response Group at Travis Air Force Base, California) each consist of three operational squadrons and one support squadron. These response groups provide the core cadre for expeditionary command and control, airlift, air refueling operations, and aircraft maintenance personnel for deployment worldwide as mobility control and airfield assessment teams. These teams survey, assess, and establish contingency air bases and expand existing Air Mobility Command support infrastructure worldwide. A third group, the 621st Air Mobility Advisory Group, consists of five squadrons that advise partner nations, augment theater command and control, and liaise with joint partners to facilitate mobility operations.

== Mission ==
The 621st Contingency Response Wing facilitates the global deployment of personnel and equipment for Air Mobility Command (AMC).

Operations can be classified by three types: Joint Task Force — Port Opening, where USAF and US Army units create distribution chains; Expeditionary Air Mobility Support (EAMS), where wing personnel augment existing forces for the mission; and Initial Airbase Opening (IAO). Other operations include air advisory with partner nations, augmenting or stand-alone command and control, and air advisory on airlift assets for U.S. Army and Marine units.

== History ==
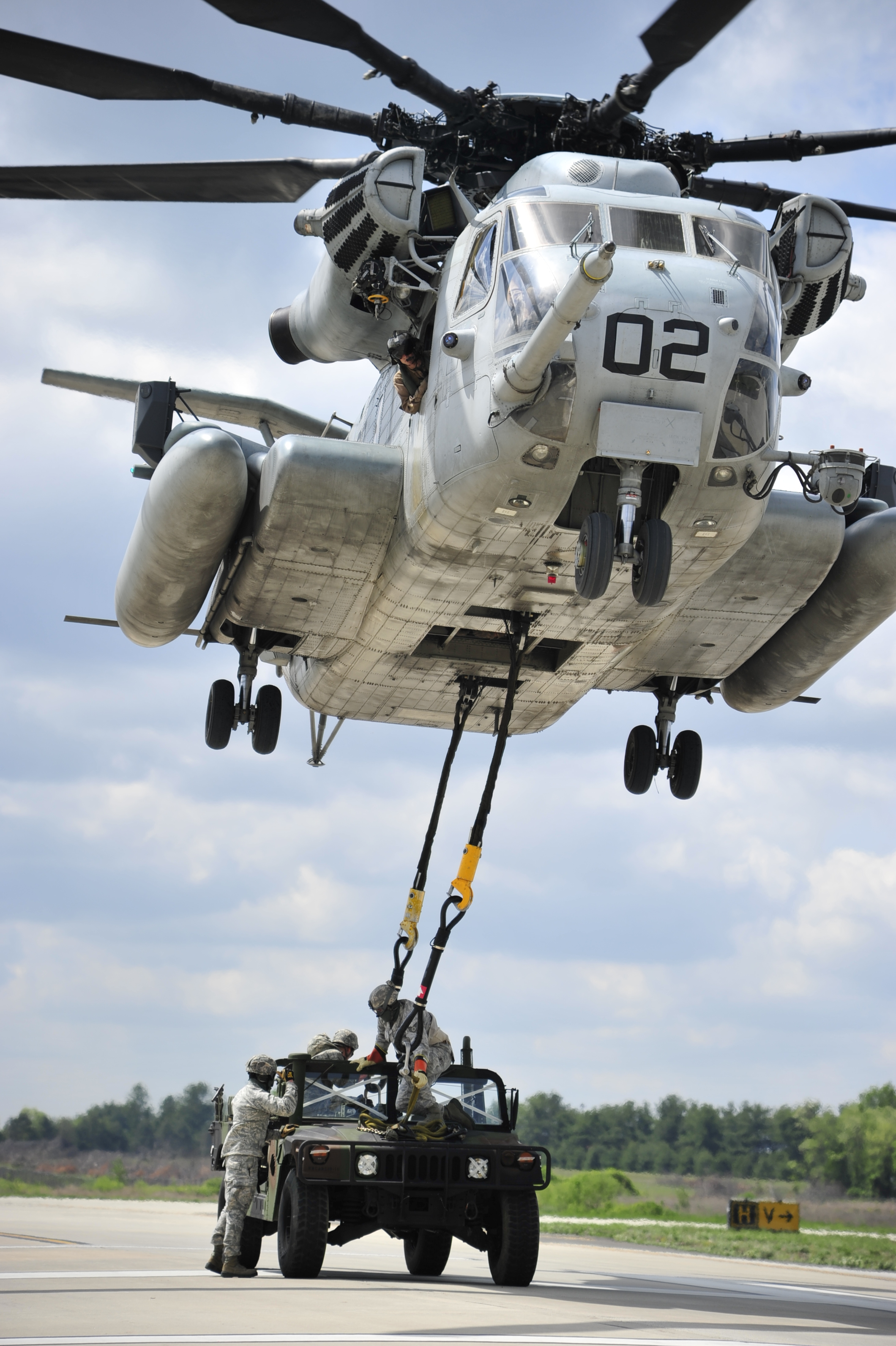
621st Airmen slingload a Humvee to a CH-53E Super Stallion at Joint Base McGuire-Dix-Lakehurst.

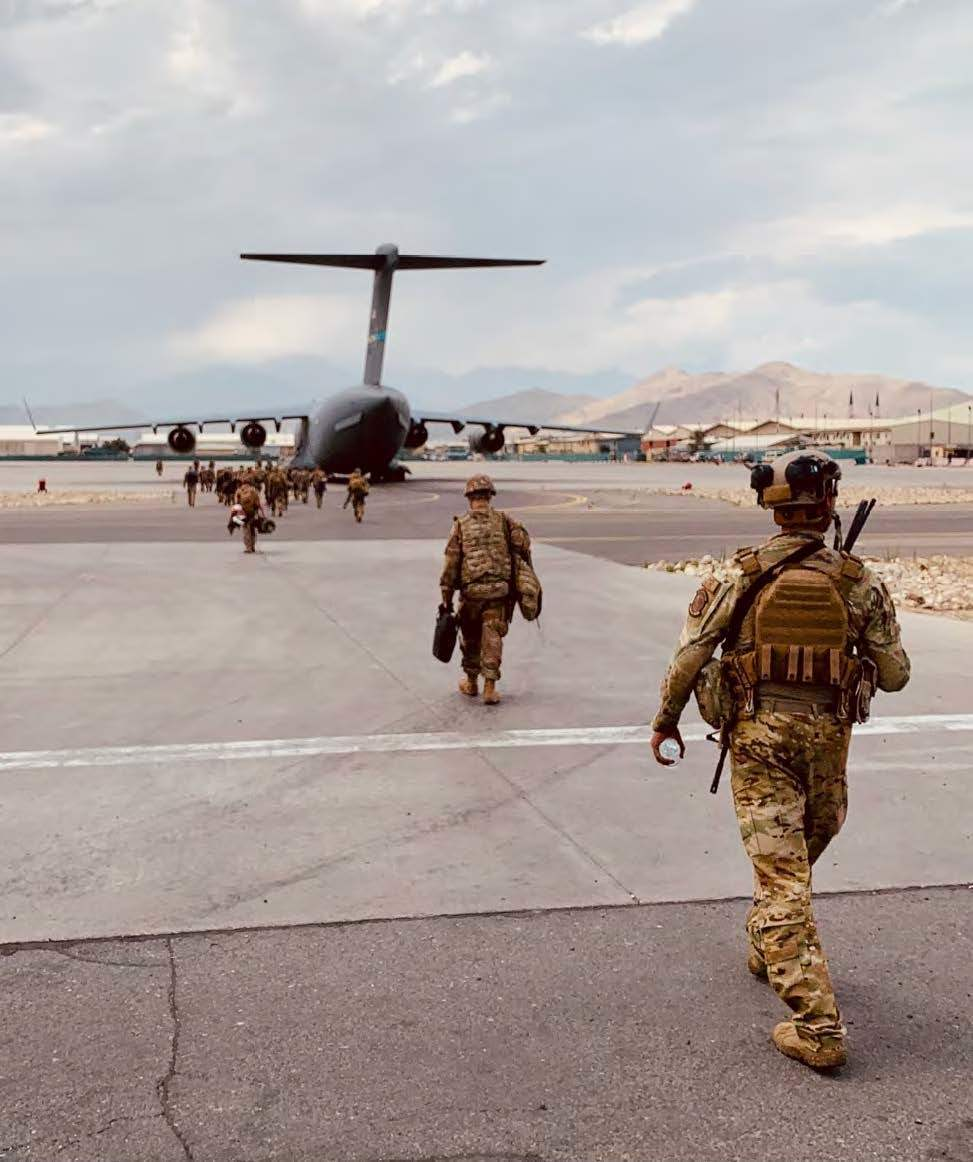
621st airmen prepare to depart Hamid Karzai International Airport during Operation Allies Refuge, August 2021

The 621st was established on 24 June 1994 as the 621st Air Mobility Operations Group and was activated on 22 July of the same year at McGuire Air Force Base (part of Joint Base McGuire–Dix–Lakehurst since 2009). It was expanded into the 621st Contingency Response Wing on 1 March 2005. The 621st included four groups, eight squadrons, and ten geographically separated operating locations aligned with major US Army and Marine Corps combat units. The wing maintains mobility support forces able to respond as directed by the Eighteenth Air Force at Scott Air Force Base, Illinois, to meet combatant command wartime and humanitarian requirements. In the 2010 Haiti earthquake of 12 January, the 817th Contingency Response Group deployed to Toussaint L'Ouverture International Airport, Port-au-Prince, Haiti, in support of Operation Unified Response. Before the earthquake, Toussaint L'Ouverture handled an average of 20 flights a day. Following the earthquake, flight volume increased from an average of 20 to a peak of 160 aircraft per day on 19 January, representing an 800% increase in air traffic.

In early 2010, airmen from the 571st Contingency Response Group and 819th Global Support Squadron deployed to Camp Marmal, Mazar-i-Sharif, Afghanistan, to provide aerial cargo handling support for the Operation Enduring Freedom logistics surge. The 816th Contingency Response Group was inactivated on 11 June 2010. In August 2010, 30 airmen from the 818th Contingency Response Group deployed as a Contingency Response Element to Chaklala Airbase, Pakistan. Once deployed, they provided additional aerial port capabilities to increase aircraft loading efficiency for the Pakistan Air Force's Central Flood Relief Cell.

Airmen from the 621st Contingency Response Group deployed three times in support of Operation Inherent Resolve. In 2015, they deployed to Iraq, where they established an airstrip at al-Taqaddum to support coalition forces in the Battle for Ramadi. In 2016, the group established the Kobani airfield in Syria and also set up an airfield at Qayyarah West in Iraq to support coalition forces in the Battle of Mosul. In November 2016, airmen from the group with a contingent of civil engineers, intelligence personnel and security forces were temporarily deployed to expand and modify the airstrip near Kobani to support the offensive to retake Raqqa from ISIS. General Carlton D. Everhart II, commander of Air Mobility Command, stated that the base enables aircraft to deliver critical supplies and equipment and helps position forces.

In early 2021, the 621st was involved in the closure of multiple airfields and bases within Afghanistan as part of the withdrawal of US troops from Afghanistan. On 18 August 2021, the Pentagon announced the deployment of the 621st back into Afghanistan to support evacuation operations following the collapse of the Afghan government.

== Operations for NASA ==
During the Space Shuttle program (1972–2011), the 621st provided standby support for potential emergency landings at alternate locations. Wing airmen were on call during scheduled launches to facilitate a response in the event of a post-launch emergency requiring the shuttle to land at an alternate location.

== Lineage ==
- Constituted as the 621st Air Mobility Operations Group on 24 June 1994
- Activated on 22 July 1994
- Re-designated the 621st Contingency Response Wing on 1 March 2005
- Inactivated on June 11, 2010

=== Assignments ===
- Twenty-First Air Force (later 21st Expeditionary Mobility Task Force), 22 July 1994
- United States Air Force Expeditionary Center, 19 March 2012 – present

=== Components ===
621st Air Mobility Advisory Group (621 AMAG)

- 321st Air Mobility Operations Squadron (321 AMOS)
- 571st Mobility Support Advisory Squadron (571 MSAS)
- 621st Mobility Support Operations Squadron (621 MSOS)
- 818th Mobility Support Advisory Squadron (818 MSAS)

621st Contingency Response Group (621 CRG)

- 321st Contingency Response Squadron (321 CRS)
- 521st Contingency Response Squadron (521 CRS)
- 621st Contingency Response Squadron (621 CRS)
- 621st Contingency Response Support Squadron (621 CRSS)

821st Contingency Response Group (821 CRG)

- 721st Contingency Response Squadron (721 CRS)
- 821st Contingency Response Squadron (821 CRS)
- 821st Contingency Response Support Squadron (821 CRSS)
- 921st Contingency Response Squadron (921 CRS)

=== Stations ===
- McGuire Air Force Base (later Joint Base McGuire-Dix-Lakehurst), New Jersey, 22 July 1994
- Travis Air Force Base, California, 29 May 2012
