= 4730th Air Defense Group =

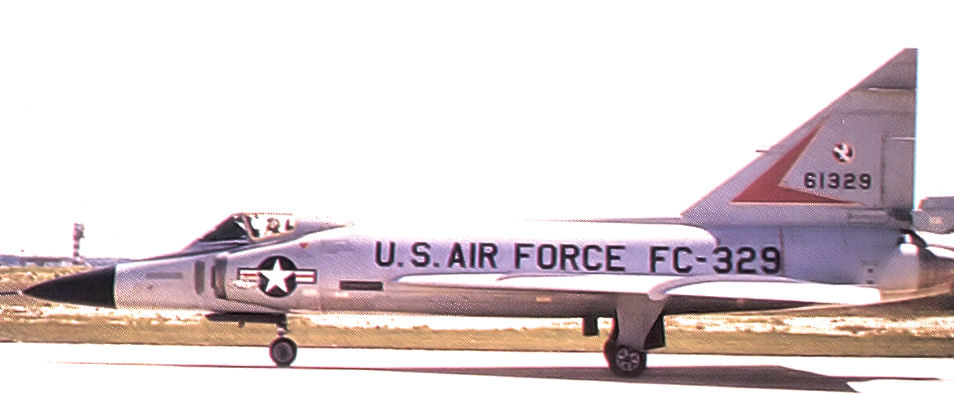
- 332d FIS Convair F-102 at McGuire AFB (Note: Aircraft is Convair F-102A-75-CO Delta Dagger, serial 56-1329. This aircraft was converted to PQM-102 drone conviguration in 1975 and shot down over the White Sands Missile Range on 21 July 1980. Dirkx, Marco (23 September 2025). "1942 USAF Serial Numbers". Joe Baugher’s Serial Number List.)
- Active: 1957–59
- Country: United States
- Branch: United States Air Force
- Type: Fighter interceptor
- Role: Air defense

Insignia
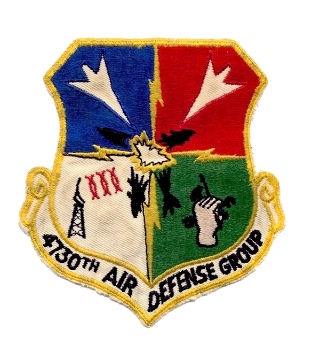
- Patch with the 4730th Air Defense Group emblem

The 4730th Air Defense Group is a discontinued United States Air Force organization. Its last assignment was with the New York Air Defense Sector at McGuire Air Force Base, New Jersey, where it was discontinued in 1959.

The group was formed to provide a single command and support organization for the two fighter interceptor squadrons of Air Defense Command that were tenants at McGuire, a Military Air Transport Service base. It was also assigned a squadron to perform aircraft maintenance. The 4730th was discontinued when the 332d Fighter-Interceptor Squadron moved in 1959, leaving only a single fighter squadron at McGuire.

== History ==
The 4730th Air Defense Group was established to provide a headquarters for the two Air Defense Command (ADC) Fighter-Interceptor Squadrons (FIS) stationed at McGuire Air Force Base, New Jersey, a Military Air Transport Service (MATS) base. MATS' 1611th Air Base Group acted as host base organization for McGuire. The group was assigned the 332d and 539th Fighter-Interceptor Squadrons (FIS), flying radar equipped and Mighty Mouse rocket armed North American F-86D Sabre aircraft as its operational components. Some of the Sabres were F-86Ls, which were equipped with a data link for interception control through the Semi-Automatic Ground Environment system. The group mission was to train and maintain tactical flying units to defend the Mid-Atlantic United States. The two fighter squadrons were already stationed at McGuire and had been assigned to the New York Air Defense Sector.

Maintenance for the two squadrons was provided by the 601st Consolidated Aircraft Maintenance Squadron (CAMS), which was activated at McGuire along with the rest of the group. The 332d FIS converted to Convair F-102 Delta Dagger aircraft in July 1957, while the 539th FIS retained its F-86s until the Spring of 1959, when it converted to Convair F-106 Delta Darts.

The group was discontinued shortly after the 332d FIS departed for England Air Force Base, Louisiana, leaving only a single operational ADC squadron at McGuire. The 601st CAMS was inactivated with the group, while the 539th FIS was assigned directly to the New York Air Defense Sector.

=== Lineage ===
- Designated as the 4730th Air Defense Group and organized on 8 February 1957

Discontinued on 1 August 1959

Assignments

- New York Air Defense Sector, 8 February 1957 – 1 August 1959

Components

- 332d Fighter-Interceptor Squadron, 8 February 1957 – 10 July 1959
- 539th Fighter-Interceptor Squadron, 8 February 1957 – 1 August 1959
- 601st Consolidated Aircraft Maintenance Squadron, 8 February 1957 – 1 August 1959

Stations

- McGuire Air Force Base, New Jersey, 8 February 1957 – 1 August 1959

=== Aircraft ===
- North American F-86D Sabre: 1957–59
- North American F-86L Sabre: 1957–59
- Convair F-102A Delta Dagger: 1957–59
- Convair F-106A Delta Dart: 1959

=== Commanders ===
- Col. Herbert L. Phillips, by 1 January 1958 – c. 31 December 1958
- Col. Phillip Brooks, c. 1 January 1959 – 1959

== See also ==
- List of F-106 Delta Dart units of the United States Air Force
- List of Sabre and Fury units in the US military
- List of United States Air Force Aerospace Defense Command Interceptor Squadrons
