= TWA Flight 891 =

1959 aviation accident

Coordinates: 45°37′39″N 8°53′34″E

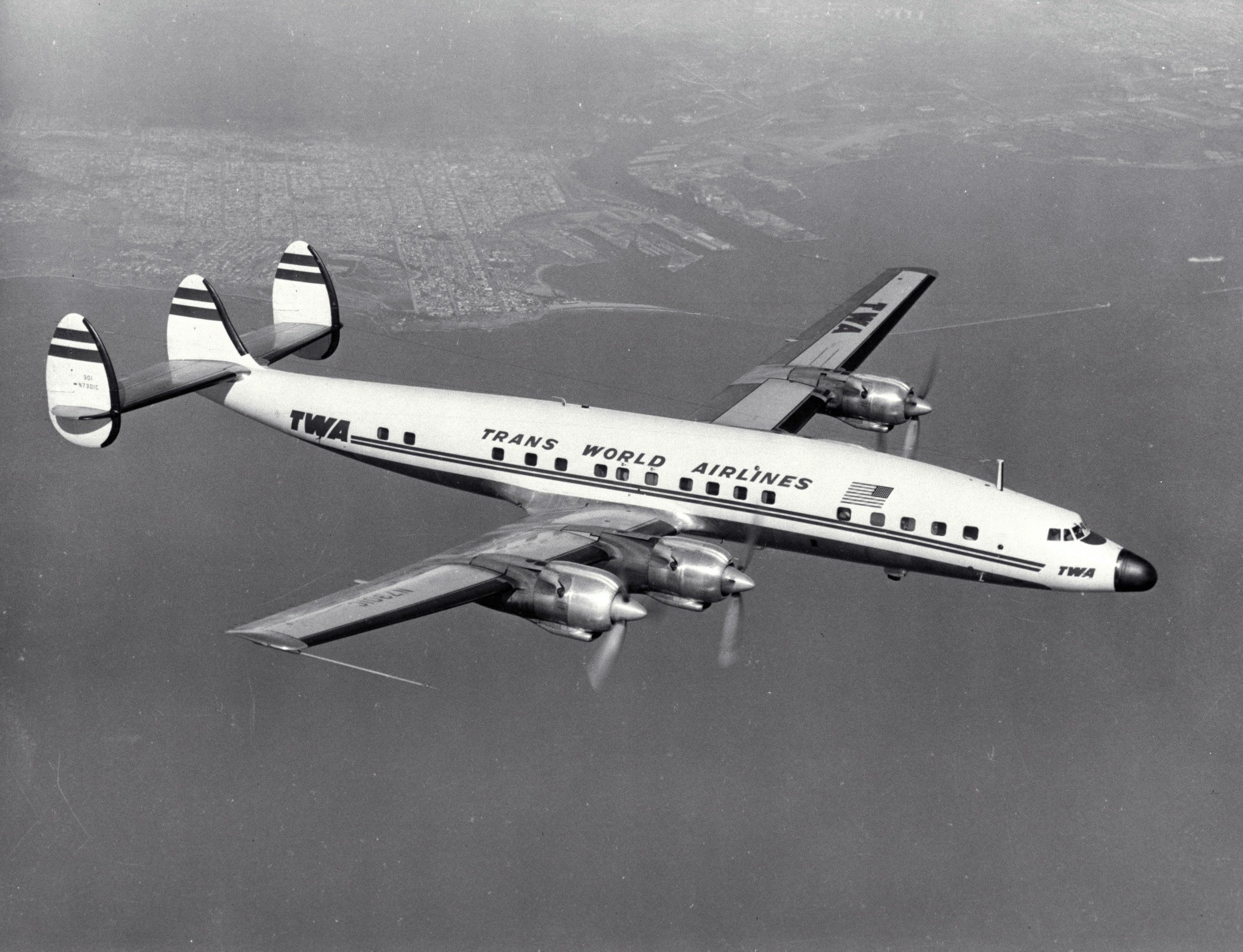
- Starliner N7301C of TWA, sister ship to the accident aircraft

Accident
- Date: 26 June 1959
- Summary: Lightning strike
- Site: In the town of Olgiate Olona near the hamlet of Marnate, Italy

Aircraft
- Aircraft type: Lockheed L-1649A Starliner
- Aircraft name: Star of Severn
- Operator: Trans World Airlines
- Call sign: TWA 891
- Registration: N7313C
- Flight origin: Ellinikon International Airport
- Stopover: Rome Ciampino Airport
- 1st stopover: Malpensa Airport
- 2nd stopover: Paris-Orly Airport
- 3rd stopover: Shannon Airport
- 4th stopover: Gander International Airport
- Destination: O'Hare International Airport
- Occupants: 68
- Passengers: 59
- Crew: 9
- Fatalities: 68
- Survivors: 0

TWA Flight 891 was a Lockheed L-1649A Starliner that crashed not long after taking off from Milan Malpensa Airport on 26 June 1959. All 68 passengers and crew on board were killed.

== Flight ==
On 26 June 1959, TWA Flight 891 departed Malpensa Airport in Milan, Italy, with a crew of 9 and 59 passengers on board. Sixteen passengers were from Italy, four passengers and three crew members were from France, four came from the United Kingdom, two came from Chile, one each came from West Germany, Egypt and Israel with the remaining 30 passengers and 6 crew members being American. The flight had originated in Athens, Greece, and had stopped in Rome before flying on to Milan. The subsequent leg of the flight destination was to Paris' Orly Airport. When Flight 891 departed Milan, light rain was falling with a low overcast and a ceiling of around 2,000 feet, with visibility of approximately two miles (3.2 km). There were also thunderstorms in the area.

Twelve minutes after takeoff, the flight crew reported the aircraft was climbing through 10,000 feet. A few minutes after that, the Starliner suffered structural failure and broke up in mid-air. Everyone on board was killed.

Flight 891 was the first fatal aviation accident involving a Lockheed Starliner. In terms of loss of life, it was also the worst air crash of 1959.

== Cause ==
On 24 November 1960, an Italian inquiry board announced its finding that a lightning strike had brought down Flight 891. "The breaking-up in flight was due to the explosion of the fuel vapors contained in tank number 7, followed immediately by either an explosion of pressure or a further explosion in tank #6. In the absence of other significant concrete evidence, taking into account the stormy weather conditions, with frequent electric discharges, existing in the area at the time of the crash, it may be assumed that the explosion of the fuel vapors contained in tank #7 was set off, through the outlet pipes, by igniting of the gasoline vapors issuing from these pipes as a consequence of static electricity discharges (streamer corona) which developed on the vent outlets."

== See also ==
- Pan Am Flight 214, another crash caused by lightning
