= McGuire Air Force Base =

McGuire AFB
- Near Wrightstown, New Jersey in the United States
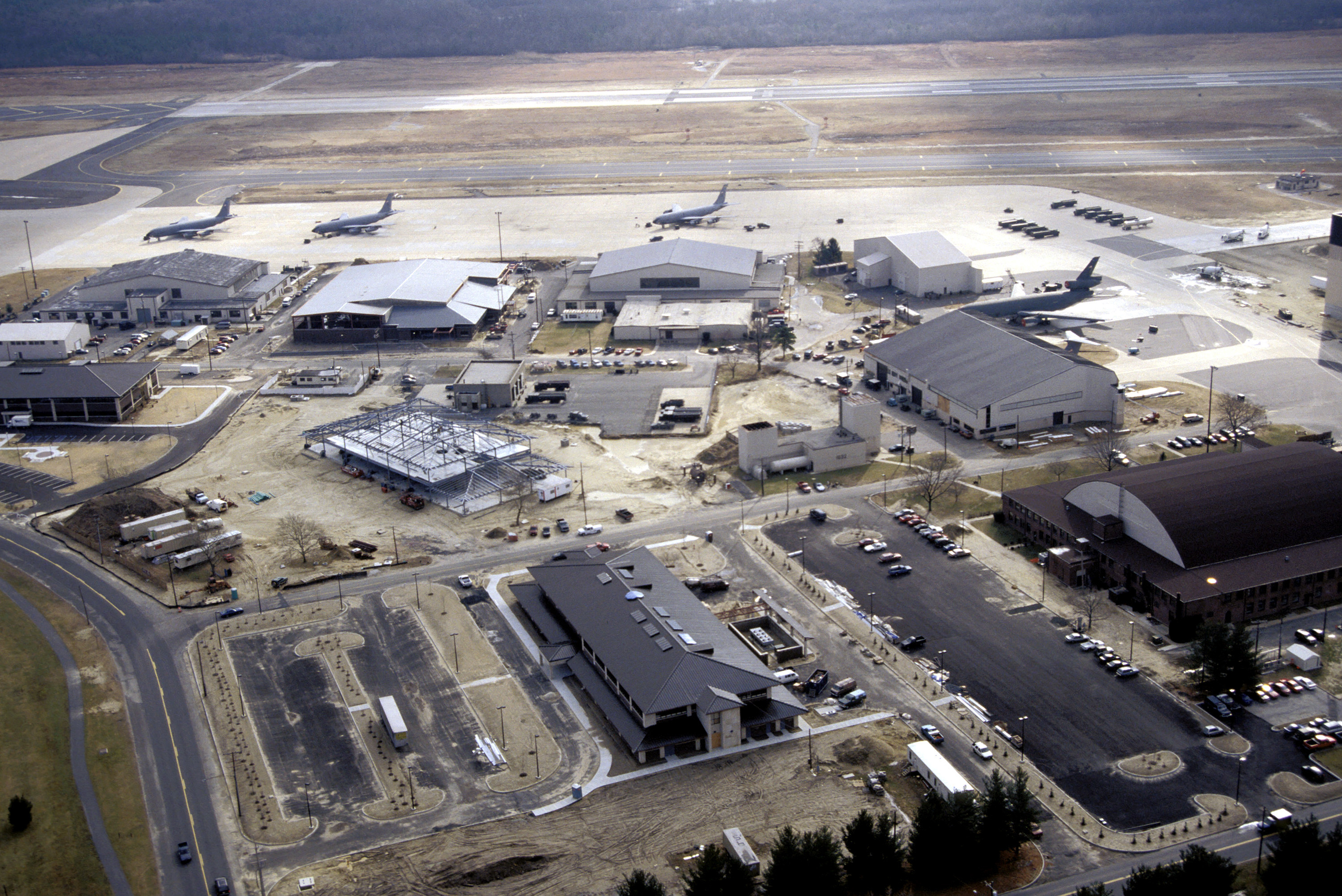
- An aerial view of McGuire AFB in 1997

Site information
- Type: US Air Force base
- Owner: Department of Defense
- Operator: US Air Force
- Website: www.mcguire.af.mil

Location
- Location within New Jersey Location within the United States Location within North America Location within North Atlantic
- Coordinates: 40°00′56″N 074°35′30″W
- Area: 40,000 acres (16,187 ha)

Site history
- Built: 1937 (as Fort Dix Airport)
- In use: 1937 – 2009
- Fate: Merged in 2009 to become an element of Joint Base McGuire–Dix–Lakehurst

Airfield information
- Identifiers: IATA: WRI, ICAO: KWRI, FAA LID: WRI, WMO: 724096
- Elevation: 42.9 metres (141 ft) AMSL
Runways
Direction	Length and surface
06/24	3,052.2 metres (10,014 ft)
18/36	2,172 metres (7,126 ft)

McGuire AFB/McGuire, the common name of the McGuire unit of Joint Base McGuire-Dix-Lakehurst, is a United States Air Force base in Burlington County, in the U.S. state of New Jersey, approximately 16.1 miles (25.9 km) south-southeast of Trenton. McGuire is under the jurisdiction of the Air Mobility Command. It was consolidated with two adjoining US Army and Navy facilities to become part of Joint Base McGuire-Dix-Lakehurst (JB MDL) on 1 October 2009.

The McGuire Air Force Base census-designated place (CDP) is located in portions of both New Hanover Township and North Hanover Township. As of the 2020 United States census, the McGuire Air Force Base CDP had a total population of 4,522.

== Overview ==
The host unit at McGuire AFB is the 87th Air Base Wing (87 ABW), United States Air Force Expeditionary Center, AMC. The 87 ABW provides installation management to all of JB MDL. The wing also provides mission-ready, expeditionary Airmen to support Unified Combatant Commanders in ongoing military operations. The wing consists of more than 3,100 officers, enlisted, and civilian personnel from the Air Force, Army and Navy. The 87th Air Base Wing is commanded by Colonel Bridget V. Gigliotti. Its Command Chief Master Sergeant is Chief Master Sergeant Tony B. Jenkins.

McGuire originated in 1941 as Fort Dix Army Airfield. Closed briefly after World War II, it reopened in 1948 as McGuire Air Force Base. The base was named after Major Thomas B. McGuire Jr., Medal of Honor recipient, and the second leading ace in American history.

March 3, 1960, while returning home from his army stint, Elvis Presley landed on McGuire Airforce Base, en route from Frankfurt, Germany; and Glasgow Prestwick Airport, Prestwick, Scotland; and Ernest Harmon Air Force Base, Stephenville, Newfoundland and Labrador, Canada. Here he disembarked the airplane, two days before his army discharge.

== Units ==
The 305th Air Mobility Wing, 108th Air Refueling Wing (ANG), 621st Contingency Response Wing, and the 514th Air Mobility Wing (AFRC), has supported every major type of air mobility mission over the past 15 years. The following units are assigned to McGuire AFB:

- 87th Air Base Wing
- 305th Air Mobility Wing
- 514th Air Mobility Wing (AFRC)
- 108th Air Refueling Wing (New Jersey ANG)
- Marine Aircraft Group 49 (MAG-49) (U.S. Marine Corps Reserve / 4th Marine Aircraft Wing)
- Marine Helicopter Light Attack Squadron 773 (HMLA-773) (U.S. Marine Corps Reserve / MAG-49)
- Fleet Logistics Support Squadron 64 (VR-64) (U.S. Navy Reserve)

McGuire is the only base in both the Air Mobility Command and the entire U.S. Air Force hosting three AMC-gained flying wings of the Regular Air Force, Air Force Reserve and Air National Guard.

McGuire is also host to:

- United States Air Force Expeditionary Center (USAF EC)—physically located on Fort Dix
- 621st Contingency Response Wing (CRW)
- 373rd Training Squadron (373 TRS), Detachment 1
- AMC Test and Evaluation Squadron (TES)

McGuire hosts the flying needs of its mission partners on JB MDL. Air Force and civilian AMC-contracted aircraft use McGuire's two runways to facilitate this mission. Many hundreds of thousands of Air Force, Army, Navy, and Marine Corps personnel have left the United States for overseas locations from McGuire AFB.

Airplanes from McGuire have provided the flyovers for Philadelphia Eagles games and Major League Baseball All-Star and World Series games played in Philadelphia at the end of the National Anthem. These same planes were also responsible for the Super Bowl XLVIII flyover and missing-man formation which came at the end of opera star Renee Fleming's rendition of the National Anthem.

== History ==
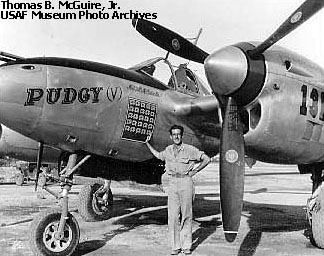
Major Thomas McGuire next to his P-38 "Pudgy (V)" in 1944

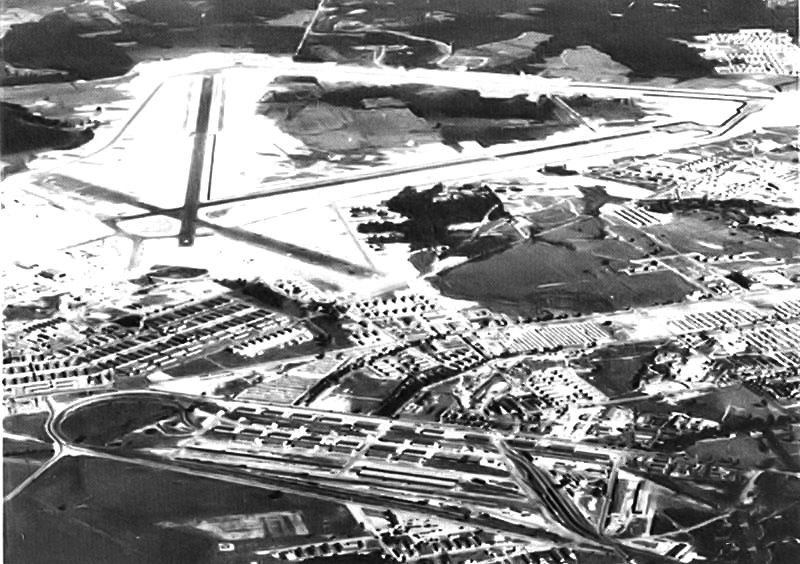
Fort Dix Army Air Base, 1943

=== Major Thomas Buchanan McGuire, Jr ===
McGuire Air Force Base was established as Fort Dix Airport in 1937 and first opened to military aircraft on 9 January 1941. On 13 January 1948 the United States Air Force renamed the facility McGuire Air Force Base in honor of Major Thomas Buchanan McGuire Jr., (1920–1945). Medal of Honor recipient and second place American flying ace of World War II, Major McGuire died on 7 January 1945 when his P-38 Lightning spun out of control and crashed on Negros Island in the Philippines as he attempted to aid his wingman during an aerial dogfight.

=== World War II ===
Flight operations to support Camp Dix at an adjacent airfield took place as early as 1926. Facilities and runways to support an air mission began in 1937 as a Civilian Conservation Corps project. This was on newly acquired land for the great Army Air Forces expansion approved by the Roosevelt Administration. This nascent airfield and wooden structures was named "Rudd Field." To meet the requirements for a possible world war, Rudd Field was renamed Fort Dix Army Air Base in 1939, and underwent massive expansion from 1940 to 1941. Runways constructed consisted of three concrete surfaced, 7100x150(N/S), 7100x150(NE/SW), 5400x150(E/W), and one macadam surfaced, 8100x150(NW/SE).

The base had its first permanent Army Air Force occupant in November 1941 when the 59th Observation Group took up station on 14 November. Initially during 1941–42 the Group operated a wide range of aircraft, including the BC-1A, L-59, O-46, O-47, O-49 Vigilant, and O-52 Owl, engaging in antisubmarine patrols along the East coast.

After the United States' entry into World War II, Fort Dix Army Air Base was used as a training and facility for numerous service units under First Air Force. Once organized and prepared for overseas duty, these units provided support and technical sections for the group requirements as a whole: Flying control, Ordnance, airfield security, firefighting, Post Exchange (PX), Special Services, Mail, Transportation ("motor pool"), Communications, Radar, Gunnery instruction, Personal Equipment, and Weather (Meteorology). The service group also had its own mess section. The service group had approximately 30 officers and 300 to 400 enlisted men. This training continued until 1944.

In late 1942, Army Air Forces Antisubmarine Command (AAFASC) took up tenant status at Fort Dix AAB. The 378th Bombardment Group patrolled with a mission to search for German U-boats in the coastal waters of the Atlantic Coast and to fly aerial coverage of friendly convoys off the east coast with Douglas O-46 and North American O-47 light observation planes. In August 1943, this mission was turned over to the United States Navy.

Air Technical Service Command began using the base in 1943 overhauling, servicing and preparing aircraft for overseas shipment to North Africa and to the United Kingdom. This mission continued until the end of the war in 1945, then received returning aircraft from Europe and arranged their shipment to operational bases or to storage locations. Part of this mission was the temporary basing of returning combat (primarily bombardment) groups from the overseas combat theaters and, with the Army Service Forces coordinating their inactivation.

Fort Dix Army Air Base was phased down in the fall of 1945 and was placed on Temporary Inactive Status on 15 February 1945; which changed to Inactive Status on 1 March 1946. Jurisdiction of the base was transferred to Strategic Air Command at Andrews Field, Maryland on 1 August 1947, the base remaining in inactive status.

=== United States Air Force ===
==== Strategic Air Command ====
Fort Dix Army Air Base was taken out of inactive status and activated as a primary installation on 29 August 1948. Initially reactivated under Strategic Air Command, the facility underwent a modernization program to convert the World War II base into a base for postwar jet aircraft. In addition, support facilities were upgraded from World War II temporary wooden structures to permanent structures for long-term use.

SAC activated the 91st Strategic Reconnaissance Wing at the newly re-designated McGuire Air Force Base on 10 November 1948. The 91st SRW was a long-range photographic reconnaissance unit equipped with a mixture of RB-17 Flying Fortresses and RB-29 Superfortresses equipped with wide variety of photographic reconnaissance and mapping cameras in the bomb bays. It moved to Barksdale Air Force Base, Louisiana, on 1 October 1949.

==== Air Defense Command ====
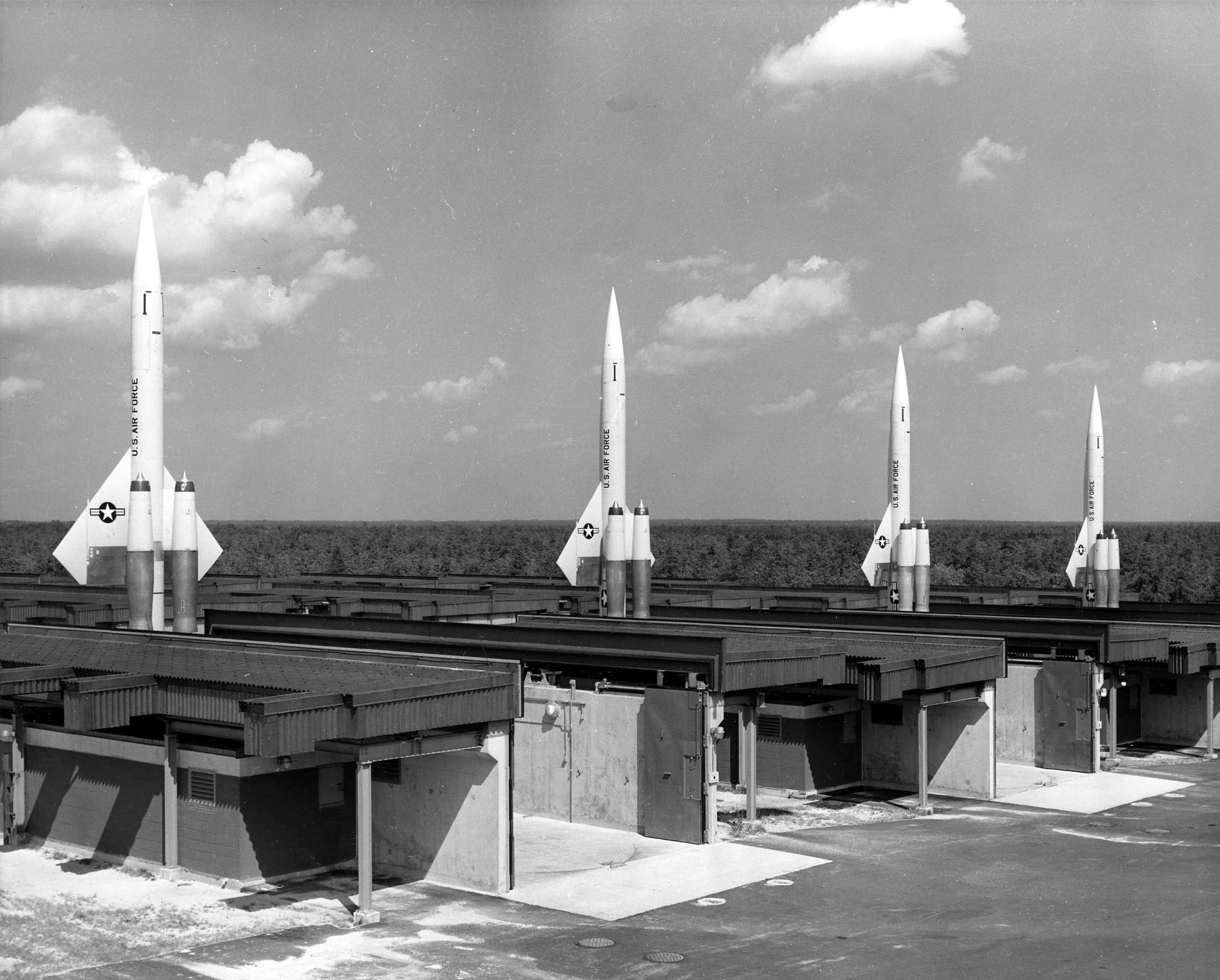
CIM-10A Bomarc Surface-to-Air missiles of the 46th Air Defense Missile Squadron

With the departure of the 91st SRW, control of McGuire AFB was reassigned to Continental Air Command (ConAC). ConAC assigned the base to Air Defense Command (ADC), at the time an operating agency of ConAC. ADC took jurisdiction of the base on 1 January 1951 with its re-establishment as a separate major command.

The 52d Fighter Wing, All Weather was assigned to the base, being moved from Mitchel Field, Long Island on 4 October 1949. Equipped with very long-range F-82 Twin Mustangs, the 52d Fighter Group, All Weather engaged in interceptor training missions against SAC B-29 and B-50 Superfortress bombers simulating air defense missions against incoming Soviet Tupolev Tu-4 bombers. The 52d remained at McGuire until 6 February 1952, when it was inactivated along with the F-82s.

The Twin Mustangs of the 52d FW were replaced by the ADC 4709th Defense Wing on 1 February 1952. Under the Eastern Air Defense Force, the 4709th DW (later Air Defense Wing), controlled interceptor squadrons at McGuire, as well as at Suffolk County AFB and Stewart AFB, New York, and Dover AFB, Delaware. Interceptor squadrons stationed at McGuire were the 2d Fighter-Interceptor Squadron and 5th Fighter-Interceptor Squadron. These were replaced in 1955 by the 332d Fighter-Interceptor Squadron and 539th Fighter-Interceptor Squadron.

These squadrons flew a variety of ADC interceptors in the 1950s, starting with the F-94 Starfire in 1952, upgrading to the F-84 Thunderjet in 1953, and finally the interceptor F-86D Sabre later in 1953.

Military Air Transport Service took over jurisdiction of McGuire AFB on 1 July 1954 and took over the flight line of McGuire in 1956, with the ADC interceptors being reassigned. Air Defense Command became a tenant organization on the base, with the 4709th ADW being re-designated as first the 4621st Air Defense Wing on 1 April 1956, and shortly afterwards as the New York Air Defense Sector (NYADS) on 1 October 1956 under the 26th Air Division.

The NYADS was in large part responsible for one of the foundational projects of the computer era: the development of the SAGE (Semi-Automatic Ground Environment) air defense system, from its first test at Bedford, Massachusetts, in 1951, to the installation of the first operational Data Center (DC-01) at McGuire AFB in 1957, becoming operational on 1 July 1958. The SAGE system was a network linking Air Force (and later FAA) General Surveillance Radar stations into a centralized center for Air Defense, intended to provide early warning and response for a Soviet nuclear attack.

Developed by Massachusetts Institute of Technology (MIT) engineers and scientists, SAGE monitored North American skies for possible attack by crewed aircraft and missiles for 25 years. The heart of the system, the AN/FSQ-7 computer, was the first computer to have an internal memory composed of "magnetic cores," thousands of tiny ferrite rings that served as reversible electromagnets. SAGE also introduced computer-driven displays, online terminals, time sharing, high-reliability computation, digital signal processing, digital transmission over telephone lines, digital track-while-scan, digital simulation, computer networking, and duplex computing.

The NYADS was reassigned from 26th AD on 1 April 1966 to First Air Force, until 30 September 1968 when both the sector was inactivated along with DC-01, when budget restrictions along with when technology advances allowed the Air Force to shut down many SAGE Data Centers. The SAGE network, however, remained active until 1983.

In 1959, Air Defense Command deployed the CIM-10 Bomarc surface-to-air missile to McGuire AFB. The Bomarc was the only surface-to-air missile ever deployed by the United States Air Force. All other U.S. land-based SAMs were and are under the control of the United States Army. The Bomarc site was located 4 miles (6.4 km) ESE of the main base 40°02′06″N 074°26′29″W in a separate facility, and was staffed by the 46th Air Defense Missile Squadron, activated on 1 January 1959. Two models of the Bomarc were deployed to McGuire, the liquid-fueled CIM-10A (28 missiles), and later the CIM-10B (56 missiles).

The supersonic Bomarc missiles were the first long-range anti-aircraft missiles in the world, and were equipped with a W40 nuclear warhead. The site at McGuire went operational in 1959 under the NYADS. Within a year of becoming operational, a Bomarc-A with a nuclear warhead caught fire on 7 June 1960 following the explosive rupture of its onboard helium tank. While the missile's explosives didn't detonate the heat melted the warhead, releasing plutonium which the fire crews then spread around. The Air Force and the Atomic Energy Commission cleaned up the site and covered it with concrete; fortunately, this was the only major incident involving the weapons system.

The Bomarc site remained in operation under successor organizations after the inactivation of the NYADS. After its closure in 1972, the accident resulted in the site remaining off limits to the present day, primarily due to low levels of plutonium contamination. Due to the accident, the McGuire complex has never been sold or converted to other uses and remains in Air Force ownership, making it the most intact site of the eight in the United States.

With the closure of the Bomarc site, the by then renamed Aerospace Defense Command ended its activities at McGuire AFB. The large SAGE DC-01 blockhouse is now the headquarters of the 621st Contingency Response Wing and previously housed the 21st Air Force/Expeditionary Mobility Task Force.

==== Strategic airlift ====
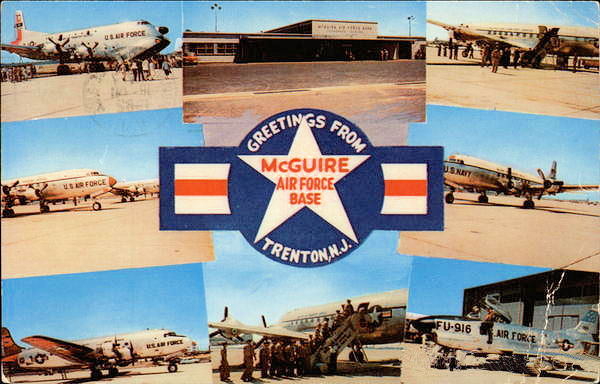
McGuire AFB—MATS era card, early 1960s

On 1 July 1954, Military Air Transport Service (MATS) took over jurisdiction of McGuire Air Force Base. Through its successor organizations, Military Airlift Command (MAC) in 1966 and since 1992 as Air Mobility Command (AMC), the primary mission of McGuire has remained the strategic airlift of personnel and equipment worldwide.

MATS activities at the base began on 1 July 1954 with the 1611th Air Transport Wing being activated. The 1611th ATW flew primarily C-118 Liftmaster (Navy R6D) transports worldwide throughout its existence. It received C-135 Stratolifters in 1962 and was upgraded from a medium to a heavy transport wing. It supported Air Force Reserve associate units beginning in 1961. The wing also operated Aerial Port and Port of Embarkation for the Northeast United States, primarily for European flights. Tenant units of MATS (and later MAC) at McGuire were the Air Weather Service and Air Rescue Service squadrons.

On 1 June 1955, MATS moved the Eastern Transport Air Force (EASTAF) to McGuire from Westover AFB, Massachusetts when SAC and Eighth Air Force took over. EASTAF was one of three components of MATS worldwide airlift force, controlling all Air Force strategic airlift operations between the Mississippi River and the east coast of Africa and in Central and South America.

On 1 January 1966 MATS was discontinued and its assets were assigned to the new Military Airlift Command (MAC). The 1611th ATW was discontinued and its mission taken over by the 438th Military Airlift Wing. EASTAF was re-designated as the 21st Air Force. 21st AF continued the mission of EASTAF, controlling MAC airlift wings at Dover AFB, Delaware and Charleston AFB, South Carolina and well as McGuire. Depending upon command organization at different times, airlift and airlift support units in Europe, the Azores, Bermuda and throughout the southeastern United States also reported to 21st AF.

The 438th MAW completed the replacement of the prop-driven transports of MATS with the new Lockheed C-141 Starlifter. For the next 30 years, the 438th MAW and transported military cargo, mail and passengers worldwide, particularly in the Eastern United States, Atlantic, European and Mediterranean areas, with frequent special missions to the Arctic, the Antarctic, South America, the Far East, and to Southeast Asia combat areas during the Vietnam War.

From 1967, McGuire was the best-known C-141 Starlifter base in the world, possessing up to a quarter of MAC's fleet of that aircraft until its retirement in 1994. On 1 December 1991, the wing was redesignated as the 438th Airlift Wing and implemented the objective wing organization. On 1 June 1992, it was assigned to the new Air Mobility Command.

==== Modern era ====
On 1 October 1994, the 438th Airlift Wing was inactivated, being replaced at McGuire by the 305th Air Mobility Wing which was transferred from Grissom AFB, Indiana when Grissom was realigned via BRAC action to the Air Force Reserve Command. The C-141 was retired in 2004, being replaced by the C-17 Globemaster III.

The 21st Air Force, coupled with the stand up of the 621st Air Mobility Operations Group (621 AMOG) and its later reorganization to the 621st Contingency Response Wing (621 CRW), partnered with the 305 AMW and spearheaded virtually every contingency over the past 14 years, from Operation JOINT ENDEAVOR in the Balkans to Operation IRAQI FREEDOM. McGuire itself, through its support organizations, has also been a key component in the transport of materials and personnel to global crisis points.

In 1999, McGuire served as the lead staging base for the evacuation of Kosovo refugees in Operation OPEN ARMS; McGuire was the rally and staging point for FEMA operations in New York City after the 11 September 2001 attacks; in 2005, the base lent key support for Hurricanes Katrina and Rita.

On 1 October 2003 the Twenty-First Air Force was re-designated as the 21st Expeditionary Mobility Task Force, reflecting its expanded mission due to the outbreak of the global war on terrorism. In 2006, McGuire AFB hosted over 1,800 Lebanese Americans evacuated from the battles there between Israel and Hezbollah insurgents. In 2008, McGuire assumed responsibility for the no-fail "Red Ball Express" aerial port mission, supplying efforts in ENDURING FREEDOM.

Today, McGuire AFB continue to operate with regular deployments of airlift and aerial refueling aircraft as well as support elements for combat operations. McGuire hosted a STRATCOM Joint Task Force satellite recovery team with no prior notice in February 2008, winning praise for its flexibility and support.

Due to a Department of Defense (DoD) initiative, McGuire will be the lead service in the first tri-service Joint super-base, combining its infrastructure support with the support of Fort Dix (Army) and Naval Air Engineering Station Lakehurst (Navy). Additionally, the 2005 Base Realignment and Closure Commission (BRAC) identified several units to be added to Team McGuire over the next few years, including contingents from every service branch. Construction of many new facilities, a beautification effort, and new privately owned contract family housing, make McGuire one of the premier Air Force installations.

=== Major commands to which assigned ===
- First Air Force, 3 July 1942
- Air Service Command, 13 October 1942
- First Air Force, 1 May 1944
- Air Transport Command*, 1 June 1945
- Strategic Air Command*, 30 April 1947
- Continental Air Command, 1 October 1949
- Air Defense Command

Eastern Air Defense Force, 1 January 1951

- Military Air Transport Service

Eastern Transport Air Force, 1 July 1954
Redesignated: Military Airlift Command
Twenty-First Air Force, 8 January 1966

- Air Mobility Command

Twenty-First Air Force, 1 June 1992 – 1 October 2003
Eighteenth Air Force, 1 October 2003 – 7 January 2011
United States Air Force Expeditionary Center, 7 January 2011 – present

- McGuire put on temporary inactive status, 15 February 1946; inactive status, March 1946; transferred to jurisdiction of Selfridge Fld, Michigan, 1 May 1947; transferred to jurisdiction of Andrews AFB, Maryland, 1 August 1947; transferred from jurisdiction of Andrews Fld to Topeka AFB, Kansas, 16–28 August 1948; reactivated as primary installation, 29 August 1948. During inactive status, field remained under major command jurisdiction.

=== Major units assigned ===
- 15th Bombardment Squadron, 14 October 1941 – 1 February 1942
- 59th Observation Gp, 1 November 1941 – 18 October 1942
- 95th Air Base Sq, 10 February 1942

Redesignated: 95th Base HQ and Air Base Sq, 20 June 1942 – 1 April 1944

- 14th Fighter Group, 19 July – 6 August 1942
- 377th Bombardment Group, 14 October – 9 December 1942
- Eighth Air Force, 29 June – 5 August 1942
- 4107th AAF Base Unit, 1 April – 1 May 1944
- 116th AAF Base Unit, 1 June 1944 – 31 May 1945
- 453d Bombardment Group, 12 June – 12 September 1945
- 455th Bombardment Group, 9 June – 12 September 1945
- 4149th AAF Base Unit, 1 December 1944 – 26 February 1946
- 592d AAF Base Unit, 25 May 1945 – 15 February 1946
- 4202d Base Service Sq, 1 August – 10 November 1948
- 91st Strategic Reconnaissance Wing, 20 July 1948 – 30 September 1949
- 21st Air Division, 1 April 1966 – 31 December 1967
- 4621st Air Defense Wing (SAGE), 1 April 1956

Re-designated: New York Air Defense Sector, 8 January 1957 – 1 April 1966

- 52d Fighter Group (Air Defense), 4 October 1949 – 6 February 1952
- 52d Fighter All-Weather Wing, 1 January 1951

Re-designated: 52d Fighter-Interceptor Wing, 1 May 1951 – 6 February 1952

- 71st Missile Warning Wing, 21 July 1969 – 30 April 1971
- 84th Fighter Group (Air Defense), 10 October 1949 – 2 June 1951 (AFRES)
- 84th Fighter All-Weather Wing, 1–2 June 1951 (AFRES)
- 4709th Air Defense Wing, 1 February 1952 – 18 October 1956
- 568th Air Defense Group, 1 February 1952

Re-designated: 568th Air Defense Group, 16 February 1953 – 1 July 1954

- 4730th Air Defense Group, 1 February 1957 – 1 August 1959
- 2d Fighter-All Weather squadron, 1 January 1951

Re-designated: 2d Fighter-Interceptor Squadron, 1 May 1951 – 18 August 1955

- 332d Fighter-Interceptor Squadron, 18 August 1955 – 1 January 1960
- 539th Fighter-Interceptor Squadron, 18 August 1955 – 31 August 1977
- 46th Air Defense Missile Squadron, 1 January 1959 – 31 October 1972, 46th Squadron shoulder patch
- 1611th Air Transport Wing, 1 July 1954 – 8 January 1966
- Aerial Port of Embarkation, 15 April 1955 – 15 February 1978
- Atlantic Division, Military Air Transport Service

Redesignated: Twenty-First Air Force, 1 June 1955 – 1 October 2003
Redesignated: 21st Expeditionary Mobility Task Force, 1 October 2003 – 19 March 2012

- Naval Air Transport Squadron Three (VR-3), 16 July 1957 – 19 July 1967
- Naval Air Transport Wing, Atlantic, 15 May 1958 – 1 March 1966
- 305th Air Refueling Squadron, 15 January 1960 – 25 March 1965
- 514th Military Airlift (later Air Mobility) Wing, 15 March 1961–present
- 903d Troop Carrier (later Military Airlift) Group, 28 December 1962 – 1 July 1973
- 108th Tactical Fighter (later Air Refueling) Wing, 1 July 1965–present
- 438th Military Airlift (later Airlift) Wing, 8 January 1966 – 1 October 1994
- 305th Air Mobility Wing, 1 October 1994–present
- 621st Contingency Response Wing, March 2005–present
- 87th Air Base Wing, 3 March 2009–present

References for history introduction, major commands and major units

=== Aircraft flown ===
Designation	Years
C-130	2011–present
C-9B	2011–2012
C-17	2004–present
KC-46	2021–present
KC-10	1994–2023
C-141	1967–2004
KC-135	1991–2023
F-4E	1985–1991
F-4D	1981–1985
F-105B	1964–1981
F-94	1950–1952
F-86	1953–1964
F-84F	1958–1962
F-84E	1955–1958
F-82	1949–1951
F-51H	1952–1955
P-47D	1952
F-106A	1959–1967
C-7	19??-19??
C-121	19??-19??
C-54	19??-19??
C-118	19??-19??
C-135	19??-1967

== Hazardous waste ==
In July 2007, the United States Environmental Protection Agency issued an order to the US military to clean up the contaminants at McGuire AFB. Areas requiring cleanup include landfills, fire training areas, pesticide mixing shops, fuel storage and leak areas, underground tanks and fuel lines, a PCB (polychlorinated biphenyl) spill site, and a wastewater treatment plant sludge disposal area.

== McGuire Air Force Base CDP ==
McGuire AFB CDP
- Census-designated place
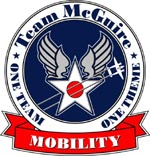
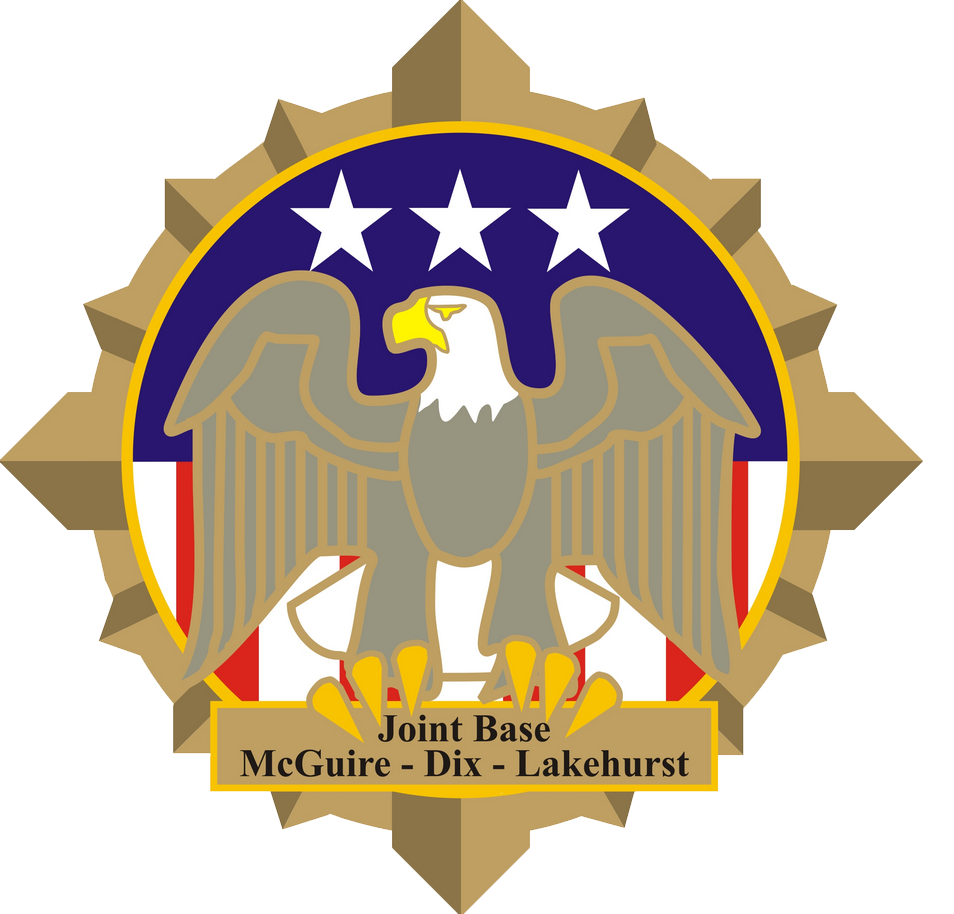
- Flag Seal Coat of arms

- McGuire SFB CDP's location in Burlington County (Inset: Burlington County in New Jersey)
- Coordinates: 40°1′42″N 74°35′18″W
- Country: United States
- State: New Jersey
- County: Burlington
- Townships: New Hanover; North Hanover

Area
  - Total: 5.364 sq mi (13.89 km^{2})
  - Land: 5.359 sq mi (13.88 km^{2})
  - Water: 0.005 sq mi (0.013 km^{2}) 0.10%
- Elevation: 112 ft (34 m)

Population (2020 Census)
  - Total: 4,522
  - Density: 843.8/sq mi (325.8/km^{2})
- Time zone: UTC−05:00 (Eastern (EST))
  - Summer (DST): UTC−04:00 (Eastern (EDT))
- ZIP Code: 08641
- Area codes: 609, 732
- FIPS code: 34-42390
- GNIS feature ID: 2389460

According to the United States Census Bureau, the McGuire Air Force Base CDP had a total area of 5.364 square miles (13.89 km^{2}), including 5.359 square miles (13.88 km^{2}) of land and 0.005 square miles (0.013 km^{2}) of water (0.10%).

The population was 4,522 at the 2020 census.

=== Demographics ===
Historical population
Census	Pop.	Note	%±
1970	10,933		—
1980	7,853		−28.2%
1990	7,580		−3.5%
2000	6,478		−14.5%
2010	3,710		−42.7%
2020	4,522		21.9%
Population sources: 1970–1980; 1950 1960 1970; 1980 1990 2000; 2010 2020

McGuire AFB first appeared as an unincorporated community in the 1970 U.S. census; and then was listed as a census designated place in the 1980 U.S. census.

=== 2020 census ===
McGuire AFB CDP, New Jersey – Racial and ethnic composition Note: the US Census treats Hispanic/Latino as an ethnic category. This table excludes Latinos from the racial categories and assigns them to a separate category. Hispanics/Latinos may be of any race.
Race / Ethnicity (NH = Non-Hispanic)	Pop 2000	Pop 2010	Pop 2020	% 2000	% 2010	% 2020
White alone (NH)	4,254	2,299	2,433	65.67%	61.97%	53.80%
Black or African American alone (NH)	1,175	562	573	18.14%	15.15%	12.67%
Native American or Alaska Native alone (NH)	39	14	13	0.60%	0.38%	0.29%
Asian alone (NH)	176	97	156	2.72%	2.61%	3.45%
Native Hawaiian or Pacific Islander alone (NH)	8	24	33	0.12%	0.65%	0.73%
Other race alone (NH)	23	6	47	0.36%	0.16%	1.04%
Mixed race or Multiracial (NH)	239	202	356	3.69%	5.44%	7.87%
Hispanic or Latino (any race)	564	506	911	8.71%	13.64%	20.15%
Total	6,478	3,710	4,522	100.00%	100.00%	100.00%

==== 2010 census ====
The 2010 United States census counted 3,710 people, 1,026 households, and 892 families in the CDP. The population density was 692.3 people per square mile (267.3 people/km^{2}). There were 1,535 housing units at an average density of 286.5 units per square mile (110.6 units/km^{2}). The racial makeup was 69.08% (2,563) White, 16.23% (602) Black or African American, 0.46% (17) Native American, 2.64% (98) Asian, 0.67% (25) Pacific Islander, 3.77% (140) from other races, and 7.14% (265) from two or more races. Hispanic or Latino of any race were 13.64% (506) of the population.

Of the 1,026 households, 67.2% had children under the age of 18; 75.4% were married couples living together; 7.2% had a female householder with no husband present and 13.1% were non-families. Of all households, 7.5% were made up of individuals and 0.2% had someone living alone who was 65 years of age or older. The average household size was 3.27 and the average family size was 3.49.

36.5% of the population were under the age of 18, 25.2% from 18 to 24, 33.3% from 25 to 44, 4.6% from 45 to 64, and 0.5% who were 65 years of age or older. The median age was 22.2 years. For every 100 females, the population had 120.8 males. For every 100 females ages 18 and older there were 135.9 males.

==== 2000 census ====
As of the 2000 United States census there were 6,478 people, 1,498 households, and 1,466 families residing in the base. The population density was 1,208.3 people/km^{2} (3,129 people/mi^{2}). There were 1,652 housing units at an average density of 308.1 units/km^{2} (798 units/mi^{2}). The racial makeup of the base was 69.3% White, 18.9% African American, 0.7% Native American, 2.8% Asian, 0.1% Pacific Islander, 3.2% from other races, and 5.0% from two or more races. Hispanic or Latino people of any race were 8.7% of the population.

There were 1,498 households, out of which 79.4% had children under the age of 18 living with them, 89.0% were married couples living together, 4.9% had a female householder with no husband present, and 2.1% were non-families. 1.9% of all households were made up of individuals, and none had someone living alone who was 65 years of age or older. The average household size was 3.51 and the average family size was 3.53.

In the base the population was spread out, with 35.6% under the age of 18, 22.8% from 18 to 24, 39.9% from 25 to 44, 1.6% from 45 to 64, and 0.1% who were 65 years of age or older. The median age was 22 years. For every 100 females, there were 130.9 males. For every 100 females age 18 and over, there were 153.3 males.

The median income for a household in the base was $36,347, and the median income for a family was $36,136. Males had a median income of $22,000 versus $21,659 for females. The per capita income for the base was $12,364. About 5.5% of families and 6.0% of the population were below the poverty line, including 6.7% of those under age 18 and none of those age 65 or over.

The base is also the site of basic encampment for the New Jersey Wing of the Civil Air Patrol. Cadets in encampment are educated on life in the military, careers in the United States Air Force, and principles of aviation.

== Education ==
The U.S. Census Bureau lists "Joint Base MDL’s McGuire AFB and Fort Dix" in Burlington County as having its own school district. Students attend area school district public schools, as the Department of Defense Education Activity (DoDEA) does not operate any schools on that base. Students on McGuire and Dix may attend one of the following for their respective grade levels, with all siblings in a family taking the same choice: North Hanover Township School District (PK-6), Northern Burlington County Regional School District (7–12), and Pemberton Township School District (K-12).

In 1997 the North Hanover schools were the only choice for McGuire AFB dependents.

Two North Hanover district schools are located on the base and two are in Jacobstown. As of the 2014–15 school year, the district and its four schools had an enrollment of 1,230 students and 112.8 classroom teachers (on an FTE basis), for a student–teacher ratio of 10.9:1. It is the largest K-6 school district in Burlington County. Schools in the district (with 2014–15 school enrollment data from the National Center for Education Statistics) are Discovery Elementary School (grades PreK-K; 294 students) in McGuire AFB Atlantis Elementary School (1–2; 236) in McGuire AFB Clarence B. Lamb Elementary School (1–4; 425) in Jacobstown and Upper Elementary School School (5–6; 272) in Jacobstown.

Northern Burlington County Regional School District students are served from Chesterfield Township, Mansfield Township, North Hanover Township and Springfield Township, along with children of USAF personnel based at McGuire AFB. The schools in the district (with 2014–15 enrollment data from the National Center for Education Statistics) are Northern Burlington County Regional Middle School for grades 7 and 8 (758 students) and Northern Burlington County Regional High School for grades 9–12 (1,355 students).

== Transportation ==
New Jersey Route 68 links the base to U.S. Route 206 near the latter's interchanges with the New Jersey Turnpike, U.S. Route 130 and Interstate 195. New Jersey Transit provides service to and from Philadelphia on the 317 route.

== See also ==
- New Jersey World War II Army Airfields
- List of USAF Aerospace Defense Command General Surveillance Radar Stations

== Bibliography ==
- Maurer, Maurer. Air Force Combat Units of World War II. Washington, DC: U.S. Government Printing Office 1961 (republished 1983, Office of Air Force History, ISBN 0-912799-02-1).
- Ravenstein, Charles A. Air Force Combat Wings Lineage and Honors Histories 1947–1977. Maxwell Air Force Base, Alabama: Office of Air Force History 1984. ISBN 0-912799-12-9.
- Mueller, Robert, Air Force Bases Volume I, Active Air Force Bases Within the United States of America on 17 September 1982, Office of Air Force History, 1989
- A Handbook of Aerospace Defense Organization 1946–1980, by Lloyd H. Cornett and Mildred W. Johnson, Office of History, Aerospace Defense Center, Peterson Air Force Base, Colorado
- Winkler, David F. (1997), Searching the skies: the legacy of the United States Cold War defense radar program. Prepared for United States Air Force Headquarters Air Combat Command.
- Information for McGuire AFB, NJ
- This article incorporates public domain material from the Air Force Historical Research Agency
- This article incorporates public domain material from McGuire Field. United States Air Force.
