= Pan Am Flight 214 =

1963 aviation accident in Maryland

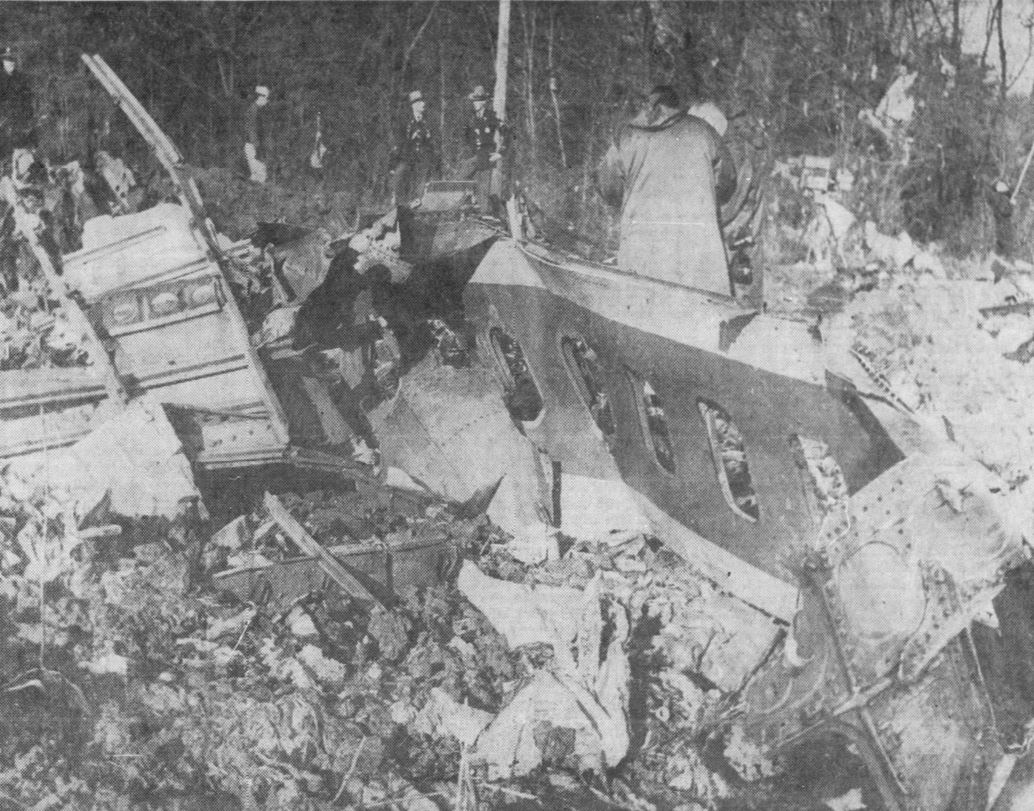
- Wreckage of the aircraft

Accident
- Date: December 8, 1963
- Summary: In-flight explosion and break up caused by lightning strike
- Site: Elkton, Maryland, United States; 39°36′47.8″N 75°47′29.7″W

Aircraft
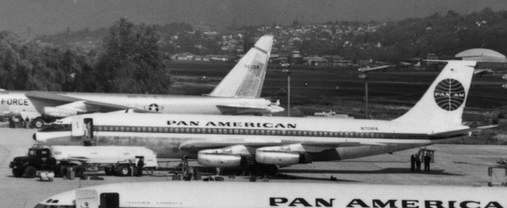
- N709PA, the aircraft involved in the accident, seen in 1958
- Aircraft type: Boeing 707-121
- Aircraft name: Clipper Tradewind
- Operator: Pan American World Airways
- IATA flight No.: PA214
- ICAO flight No.: PAA214
- Call sign: CLIPPER 214
- Registration: N709PA
- Flight origin: Isla Verde International Airport
- Stopover: Friendship Airport
- Destination: Philadelphia Int'l Airport
- Occupants: 81
- Passengers: 73
- Crew: 8
- Fatalities: 81
- Survivors: 0

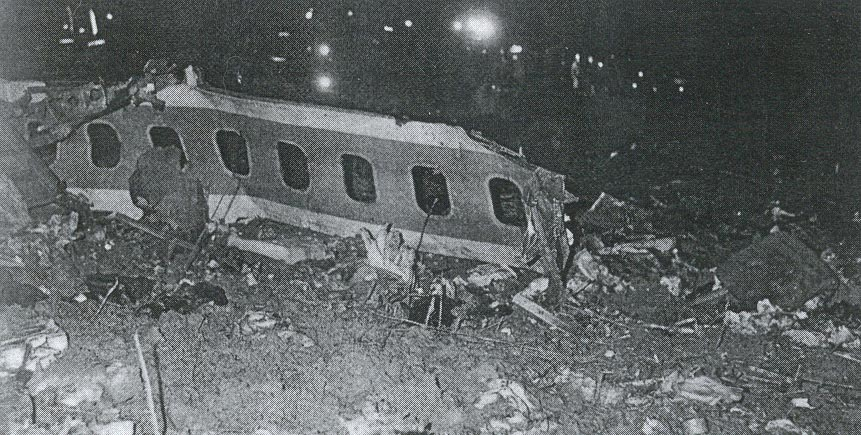
Wreckage of the aircraft

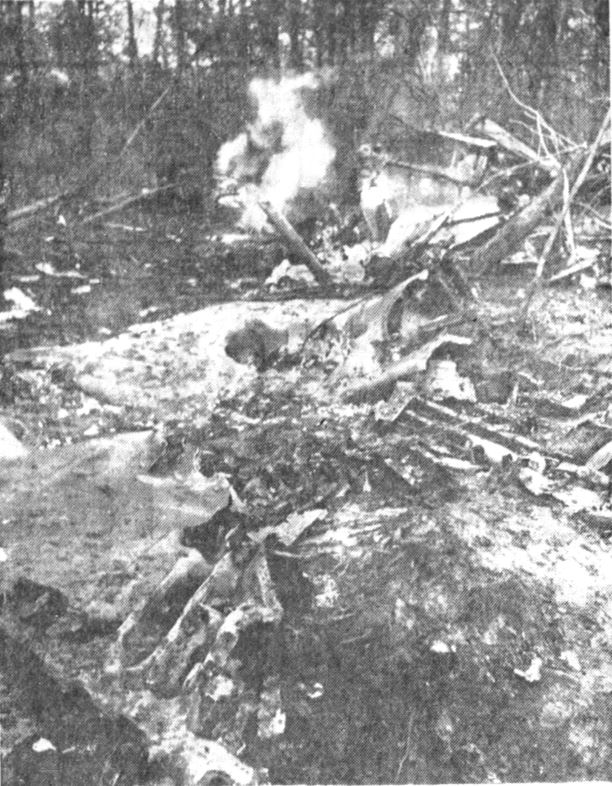
Burning remains of the aircraft

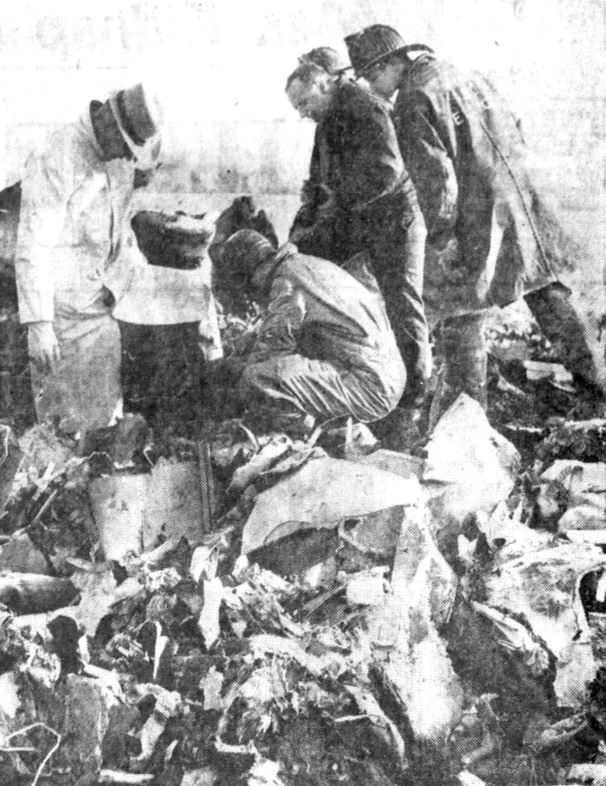
Rescue workers search for crash victims

Pan Am Flight 214 was a scheduled flight of Pan American World Airways from San Juan, Puerto Rico, to Baltimore, and then to Philadelphia in the United States. On December 8, 1963, while flying from Baltimore to Philadelphia, the Boeing 707 crashed near Elkton, Maryland. All 81 passengers and crew on the plane were killed. The crash was Pan Am's first fatal accident with the 707, which it had introduced to its fleet five years earlier.

An investigation by the Civil Aeronautics Board concluded that a lightning strike had probably ignited fuel vapor in one of the aircraft's fuel tanks, causing an explosion that destroyed the left wing. The exact manner of ignition was never determined, but the investigation increased awareness of how lightning can damage aircraft, leading to new regulations that resulted in safety improvements. The crash also inspired research into the safety of several types of aviation fuel and into ways of changing the design of aircraft fuel systems to make them safer in the event of lightning strikes.

== Background ==
Pan Am Flight 214 was a regularly scheduled flight from Isla Verde International Airport in San Juan, Puerto Rico, to Philadelphia International Airport, with a scheduled stopover at Baltimore's Friendship Airport. Flight 214 left San Juan at 4:10 pm Eastern Time on December 8, 1963, with 140 passengers and eight crew members. It arrived in Baltimore at 7:10 pm. The crew did not report any maintenance issues or problems during the flight. After 67 passengers disembarked in Baltimore, the aircraft departed at 8:24 pm with its remaining 73 passengers for the final leg to Philadelphia International Airport.

== Accident ==
Upon approaching Philadelphia, the pilots made radio contact with air traffic control at 8:42 pm. The controller informed the pilots that the airport was experiencing a line of thunderstorms, strong winds and turbulence. The controller asked whether the pilots wanted to proceed directly to the airport or to enter a holding pattern to wait for the storm to pass. The crew chose to remain at 5,000 feet (1,500 m) in a holding pattern with five other aircraft. The controller told the pilots to expect a delay of about 30 minutes. Heavy rain was falling in the holding area, with frequent lightning and gusts of wind of up to 50 miles per hour (43 kn; 80 km/h).

At 8:58 pm, the aircraft exploded. The pilots transmitted a final message: "Mayday mayday mayday, Clipper 214 out of control. Here we go." Seconds later, the first officer of National Airlines Flight 016, flying 1,000 feet (300 m) higher in the same pattern, radioed, "Clipper 214 is going down in flames." The aircraft crashed in a corn field in Cecil County, Maryland, east of Elkton, near the Delaware Turnpike, setting the rain-soaked field on fire. The plane was destroyed and everyone on board was killed. It was the first Pan Am jet to crash in the five years since the company had introduced their jet fleet.

== Aftermath ==
A Maryland state trooper who had been patrolling on Maryland Route 213 transmitted an alert on his radio as he drove toward the crash site. He was the first to arrive at the location and later stated,

It wasn’t a large fire. It was several smaller fires. The biggest section of the aircraft was a section of the fuselage with about 8 or 10 window frames ... and there was a wing and a couple of the tail wings lying in the area that was just a debris field ... It didn’t resemble an airplane. The engines were buried in the ground 10 to 15 feet (3 to 5 m) from the force of the impact.

Firefighters and police officers soon recognized that a rescue operation was pointless and all they could do was extinguish the fires and begin collecting bodies. The wreckage burned in intense fires that lasted more than four hours. First responders and police from across the county, along with men from the United States Naval Training Center Bainbridge, assisted with the response. They positioned flares around the area to define the accident scene and set up searchlights to illuminate it to ensure that the debris and human remains were undisturbed by curious spectators.

The remains of the victims were brought to the National Guard Armory in Philadelphia, where a temporary morgue was set up. Relatives showed up to the armory looking for information, but officials said it would not be possible to visually identify any of the victims. The state medical examiner needed nine days to complete the identification of the victims, using fingerprints, dental records, and personal effects that had been found nearby. In some cases, the team reconstructed the victims' faces as much as possible using mannequins.

The main crater left by the impact contained most of the aircraft's fuselage, the inner part of the left wing, the left main landing gear, and the nose gear. Portions of the plane's right wing and fuselage, right main landing gear, horizontal and vertical tail surfaces, and two of the engines were found within 360 feet (110 m) of the crater. A trail of debris from the plane extended 4 miles (6 km) from the point of impact. The complete left wingtip was found nearly 2 miles (3 km) from the crash site. Parts of the wreckage ripped a 40-foot wide (12 m) hole in a country road, shattered windows in a nearby house, and spread burning jet fuel across a wide area.

The Civil Aeronautics Board (CAB) was notified of the accident and investigators were dispatched from Washington, D.C. Witnesses of the crash described hearing the explosion and seeing the plane in flames as it descended. Of the 140 witnesses interviewed, 99 reported seeing an aircraft or a flaming object in the sky. Seven witnesses stated that they had seen lightning strike the aircraft. Seventy-two witnesses said that the ball of fire occurred at the same time as, or immediately after, the lightning strike. Twenty-three witnesses reported that the aircraft exploded after they had seen it ablaze. Witnesses saw the plane burning as it fell.

== Aircraft ==
The aircraft was a Boeing 707-121 registered with tail number N709PA. Named the Clipper Tradewind, it was the oldest commercial jet airliner in the United States at the time of the crash. It had been delivered to Pan Am on October 27, 1958, and had flown a total of 14,609 hours. It was powered by four Pratt & Whitney JT3C-6 turbojet engines, and its estimated value was $3.4 million (equivalent to $35,800,000 in 2025).

In 1959, the aircraft had been involved in an incident in which the right outboard engine was torn from the wing during a training flight in France. The plane was reported to have entered a sudden spin during a demonstration of the aircraft's minimum control speed, during which the engine broke away. The pilot regained control of the aircraft and landed safely in London using the remaining three engines. The detached engine fell into a field on a farm southwest of Paris, where the flight had originated.

== Passengers and crew ==
All 73 passengers died in the crash. They were all US residents.

The pilot in command was 45-year-old George F. Knuth, of Long Island. He had flown for Pan Am for 22 years and had 17,049 hours of flying experience, including 2,890 in the Boeing 707. In 1949, he was the captain of Pan Am Flight 100 that collided in flight with a Cessna 140, killing the two occupants of the Cessna, but with no injuries to the passengers or crew of his aircraft.

The first officer was John R. Dale, age 48, also of Long Island. He had 13,963 hours of flying time, of which 2,681 were in the Boeing 707. The second officer was Paul L. Orringer, age 42, of New Rochelle, New York. He had 10,008 hours, including 2,808 in Boeing 707 aircraft. The flight engineer was John R. Kantlehner, age 33, of Long Island. He had 6,066 hours, including 76 hours in the Boeing 707.

== Investigation ==
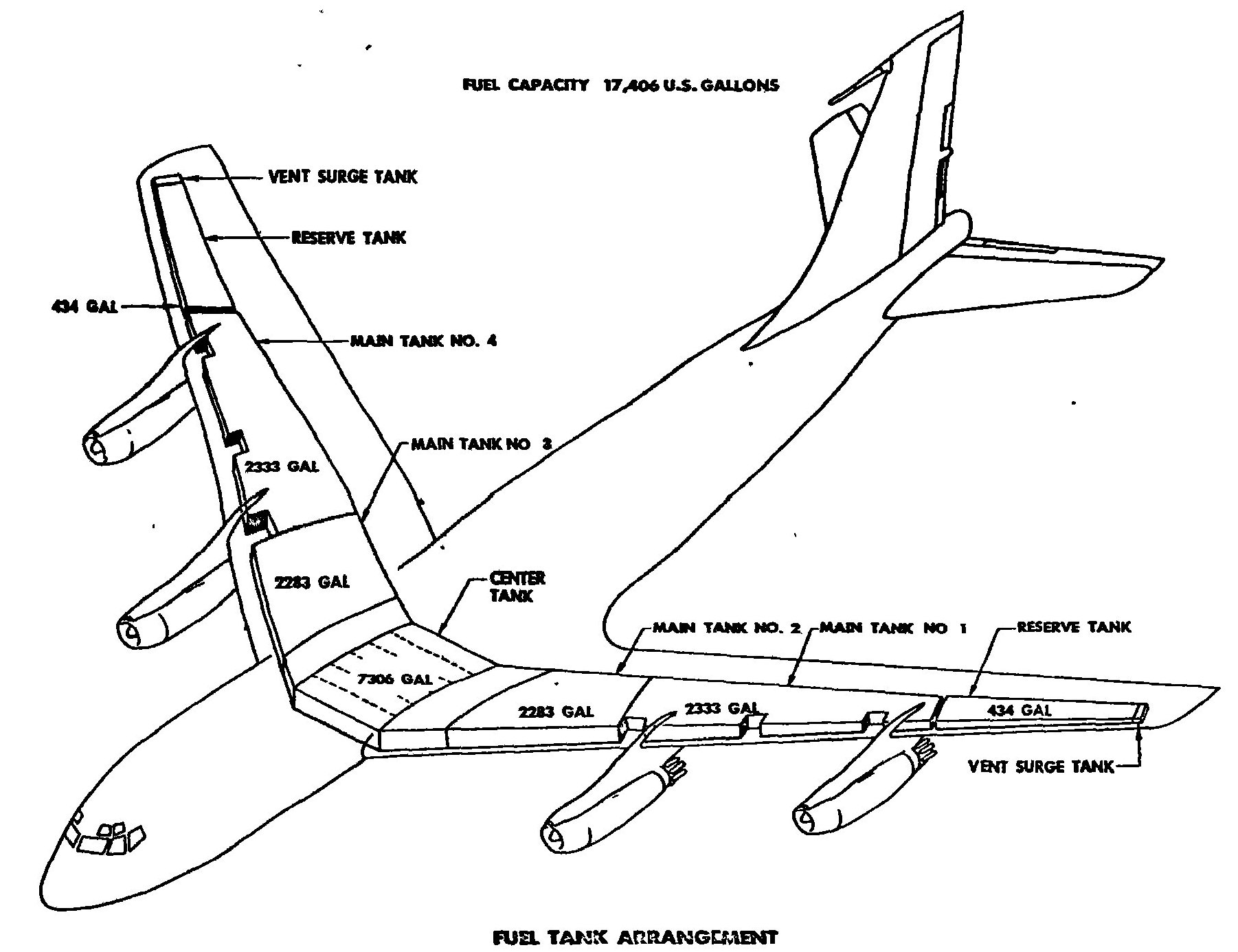
Diagram showing the Boeing 707's fuel-tank layout.

The CAB assigned more than a dozen investigators within an hour of the crash. The CAB team was assisted by investigators from the Boeing Company, Pan Am, the Air Line Pilots Association, Pratt & Whitney, the Federal Bureau of Investigation, and the Federal Aviation Agency (FAA). The costs of the CAB's investigations rarely exceeded $10,000, but the agency spent about $125,000 investigating this crash (equivalent to $1,300,000 in 2025), not including the money spent by Boeing, the FAA, Pratt & Whitney, and other aircraft-part suppliers during further investigations.

Initial theories included that severe turbulence had caused a fuel tank or fuel line to rupture, causing a fire from leaking fuel. U.S. House Representative Samuel S. Stratton of Schenectady, New York, contacted the FAA urging them to restrict jet operations in turbulent weather, but the FAA said it saw no need for such restrictions and Boeing concurred. Investigators also considered sabotage or lightning, but by nightfall after the first day they had not found evidence of either. Airline spokesmen discounted speculation that metal fatigue as a result of the aircraft's 1959 incident could have been a factor, saying the aircraft had been overhauled four times since the accident without any problems being found.

Investigators rapidly located the flight data recorder. Built to survive the impact of a crash, it had nevertheless been badly damaged. CAB chairman Alan S. Boyd said, "It was so compacted there is no way to tell at this time whether we can derive any useful information from it." Eventually, investigators extracted data from 95 percent of the tape in the recorder.

The recovery of the wreckage took 12 days, and 16 truckloads of debris were taken to Bolling Air Force Base in Washington, D.C., for investigators to examine and reassemble. One investigator said it was nearly certain that an in-flight explosion of some kind had occurred.

Within days, investigators said the crash had apparently been caused by an explosion that had blown off one of the wing tips. The left wing tip had been found a few miles from the crash site with burn marks and bulging from what looked like an internal explosion. Remnants of 9 feet (3 m) of the wing tip had been found at several points along the flight path short of the impact crater. Investigators said rough turbulence was unlikely to have caused the crash because the crews of other aircraft that had been circling in the area reported that the air was relatively smooth at the time. They also said the plane would have had to dive a considerable distance before it would break up and explode, but the aircraft had apparently caught fire close to its cruising altitude of 5,000 feet (1,500 m).

Before this flight, lightning had not been known to cause a plane to crash, despite many instances of planes being struck. In normal operations, an airplane is typically struck by lightning once or twice a year without causing any problems. Experts and airline industry representatives disputed the early theory that lightning could have caused the aircraft to explode, calling it improbable. The only similar event involving a mid-air fuel explosion caused by the weather occurred on June 26, 1959, when TWA Flight 891, a Lockheed L-1649 Starliner, crashed near Milan, Italy, as a result of static electricity igniting fuel vapor emanating from the fuel vents. Investigators examining Flight 214 found multiple lightning strike marks on the left wing tip and a large area of damage that extended along the rear edge of the wing, leading them to conclude that lightning was indeed the cause. The CAB launched an urgent research program in an attempt to identify conditions in which fuel vapor in the wing tanks could have been ignited by lightning. Within a week of the crash, the FAA issued an order requiring the installation of static electricity dischargers on the approximately 100 Boeing jet airliners that had not already been so equipped. Aviation industry representatives criticized the order, stating that there was no evidence that the dischargers would have had any beneficial effect since they were not designed to handle the effects of lightning. They said that the order would only serve to create a false impression that the risk of lightning strikes had been resolved with little actual benefit.

The CAB conducted a public hearing in Philadelphia in February 1964 as part of its investigation. Experts had still not proven that lightning had caused the accident, but they were looking into ways that lightning could have triggered the explosion. The FAA also said that it would conduct research to determine the relative safety of the two types of jet fuel used in the United States, both of which were present in the fuel tanks of Flight 214. Criticism of the JP-4 or Jet B jet fuel that was in some of the tanks was related to the fact that its vapor can be easily ignited at the low temperatures encountered in flight. Advocates of Jet B countered that the fuel was as safe, or safer than, Jet A, the other fuel used in turbine engines which was also present in Flight 214's fuel tanks.

In a test flight designed to simulate moderate to rough turbulence in flight, Pan Am tested a Boeing 707 to find out whether fuel could leak from the tank-venting system during such conditions. The test did not reveal any fuel discharge, but it did show that some fuel had entered the vent system, collected in the surge tanks, and returned to the tanks. Pan Am said that it would test a new system to inject inert gas into the air spaces in the fuel tanks in aircraft, hoping to reduce the risk of ignition of the hazardous fuel-air mixtures in those spaces.

On March 3, 1965, the CAB released its final accident report. The investigators concluded that a lightning strike had ignited the fuel-air mixture in the number-one reserve fuel tank, which had caused an explosive disintegration of the outer part of the left wing, leading to a loss of control. Despite one of the most intensive research efforts in its history, the agency could not identify the exact mechanics of the fuel ignition, concluding that lightning had ignited fuel vapor through an as-yet-unknown pathway. The board said, "It is felt that the current state of the art does not permit an extension of test results to unqualified conclusions of all aspects of natural lightning effects. The need for additional research is recognized and additional programming is planned."

== Legacy ==
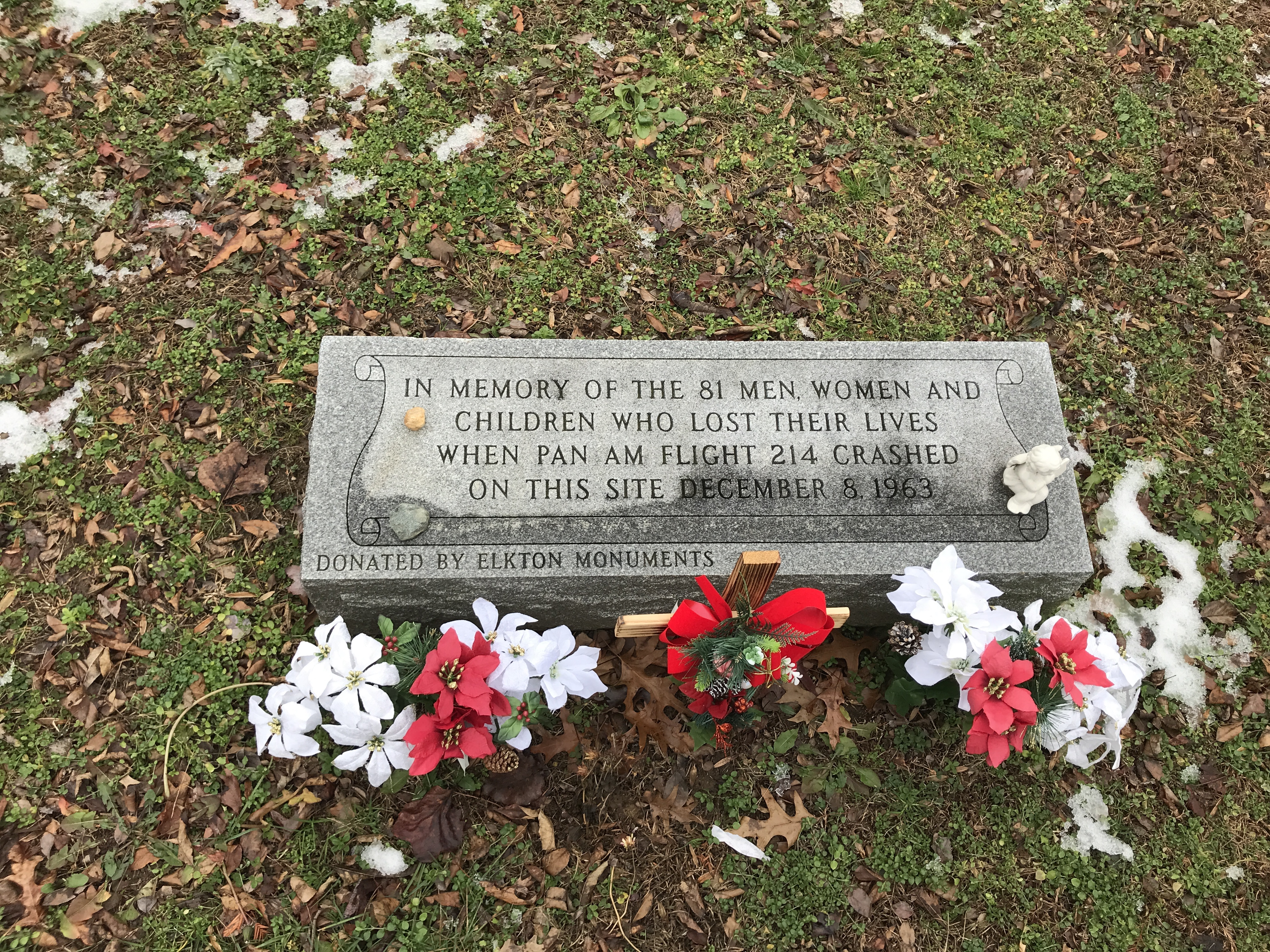
Monument erected at the crash site, Wheelhouse Drive, Elkton, Maryland (2022)

The crash called attention to previously unknown risks to aircraft from lightning strikes. One month after the crash, the FAA formed a technical committee on lightning protection for fuel systems that included lightning experts as well as representatives from the FAA, CAB, and other government agencies. The committee agreed to conduct both long-range and short-range studies of the impact of lightning on aircraft fuel systems and potential measures to defeat such hazards. In 1967, the FAA updated airworthiness standards for transport-category airplanes with requirements that fuel systems must be designed to prevent the ignition of fuel vapor within the system by lightning strikes and published guidance related to that requirement. Further requirements to protect the aircraft from lightning were enacted in 1970.

Many aircraft-design improvements emerged as a result of the research. New regulations mandated the electrical bonding between the surface of the aircraft and any items installed on the surface of the wings near the tanks, such as fuel filler caps, drain valves, and access panels. Fuel-vent flame arrestors were added to aircraft to detect and discharge fire suppressant to extinguish fuel vapors that ignite at the fuel-vent outlets. Passive flame arrestors were also added to internal vent pipes to help extinguish any flames that make it past the first stage arrestors. The minimum thickness of the aluminum surfaces of aircraft wings was increased to reduce the potential for lightning to completely melt through a wing surface into the wing's internal components and fuel tanks.

In February 1964, the FAA asked the Coordinating Research Council, a petroleum industry research group, to conduct a "technical review … in regard to the safety hazards of turbine fuels in civil aircraft operations." The Council formed the Group on Aviation Fuel Safety, composed of engineers from the airline, airframe, and petroleum industries with the objective of studying the safety and usage of several aviation fuels and to determine "whether the adoption of a single turbine fuel by commercial aviation would result in a significant decrease in the likelihood of accidents and/or loss of life". After a period of review, the Group concluded that although there are operational differences among the fuel types, the adoption of a single type of aviation fuel would not significantly improve the safety of commercial aviation and recommended that airlines continue to be individually responsible for fuel type selection.

== See also ==
- Aeroflot Flight 1492 – Another accident caused by a lightning strike
- LANSA Flight 508 – Another accident caused by a lightning strike
- TWA Flight 800 – Aircraft accident caused by ignition of fuel vapor
