= Frank Burke (United States Army officer) =

United States Army Medal of Honor recipient (1918–1988)

Francis X. Burke
- Born: September 29, 1918; New York City, US
- Died: September 6, 1988 (aged 69); Arneytown, New Jersey, US
- Burial place: Brigadier General William C. Doyle Veterans Memorial Cemetery, Arneytown, New Jersey
- Military career
- Allegiance: United States of America
- Branch: United States Army
- Rank: Major
- Units: D Company; 1st Battalion; 15th Infantry Regiment; 3rd Infantry Division
- Conflicts: World War II
- Awards: Medal of Honor

Francis Xavier Burke (September 29, 1918 – September 6, 1988) was a United States Army officer and a recipient of the United States military's highest decoration, the Medal of Honor, for his actions in World War II.

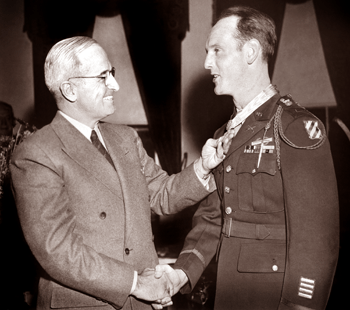
First Lieutenant Frank Burke receiving the Medal of Honor from President Harry S. Truman

== Biography ==
Francis Xavier "Frank" Burke entered active duty in the U.S. Army from the New Jersey National Guard in Jersey City, New Jersey, and by April 17, 1945, was the Transportation Officer, as a first lieutenant, in D Company, 1st Battalion, 15th Infantry Regiment, 3rd Infantry Division. On that day, in Nuremberg, Germany, he repeatedly engaged German forces alone during the fight to capture the city. For these actions, he was awarded the Medal of Honor nine months later, on January 9, 1946. Burke was of Irish descent.

Burke reached the rank of Major before leaving the Army. He died at age 69 and was buried at the Brigadier General William C. Doyle Veterans Memorial Cemetery in Arneytown, New Jersey.

The barracks complex housing 1st Battalion 15th Infantry on Kelley Hill, Fort Benning, is named "Burke Barracks" in honor of 1LT Burke. It consists of a Charge of Quarters soldier center (building 9140) and three main barracks buildings (9141, 9142, 9143) housing up to 96 soldiers per building, 288 soldiers in the entire complex.

== Medal of Honor citation ==
Burke's official Medal of Honor citation reads:

He fought with extreme gallantry in the streets of war-torn Nuremberg, Germany, where Company D, 1st Battalion, 15th Infantry, was engaged in rooting out fanatical defenders of the citadel of Nazism. As battalion transportation officer he had gone forward to select a motor-pool site, when, in a desire to perform more than his assigned duties and participate in the fight, he advanced beyond the lines of the forward riflemen. Detecting a group of about 10 Germans making preparations for a local counterattack, he rushed back to a nearby American company, secured a light machinegun with ammunition, and daringly opened fire on this superior force, which deployed and returned his fire with machine pistols, rifles, and rocket launchers. From another angle a German machinegun tried to blast him from his emplacement, but 1st Lt. Burke killed this guncrew and drove off the survivors of the unit he had originally attacked. Giving his next attention to enemy infantrymen in ruined buildings, he picked up a rifle dashed more than 100 yards through intense fire and engaged the Germans from behind an abandoned tank. A sniper nearly hit him from a cellar only 20 yards away, but he dispatched this adversary by running directly to the basement window, firing a full clip into it and then plunging through the darkened aperture to complete the job. He withdrew from the fight only long enough to replace his jammed rifle and secure grenades, then re-engaged the Germans. Finding his shots ineffective, he pulled the pins from 2 grenades, and, holding 1 in each hand, rushed the enemy-held building, hurling his missiles just as the enemy threw a potato masher grenade at him. In the triple explosion the Germans were wiped out and 1st Lt. Burke was dazed; but he emerged from the shower of debris that engulfed him, recovered his rifle, and went on to kill 3 more Germans and meet the charge of a machine pistolman, whom he cut down with 3 calmly delivered shots. He then retired toward the American lines and there assisted a platoon in a raging, 30-minute fight against formidable armed hostile forces. This enemy group was repulsed, and the intrepid fighter moved to another friendly group which broke the power of a German unit armed with a 20-mm gun in a fierce fire fight. In 4 hours of heroic action, 1st Lt. Burke single-handedly killed 11 and wounded 3 enemy soldiers and took a leading role in engagements in which an additional 29 enemy were killed or wounded. His extraordinary bravery and superb fighting skill were an inspiration to his comrades, and his entirely voluntary mission into extremely dangerous territory hastened the fall of Nuremberg, in his battalion's sector.

== See also ==
- List of Medal of Honor recipients
- List of Medal of Honor recipients for World War II
