= North Hanover Township School District =

School district in Burlington County, New Jersey, US

Address
- 331 Monmouth Road Wrightstown, Burlington County, New Jersey, 08562; United States
- Coordinates: 40.071261°N 74.585888°W

District information
- Grades: K-6
- Superintendent: Helen E. Payne
- Business administrator: Amy Lerner
- Schools: 3

Students and staff
- Enrollment: 1,127 (as of 2020–21)
- Faculty: 124.1 FTEs
- Student–teacher ratio: 9.1:1

Other information
- District Factor Group: CD
- Website: www.nhanover.com
Ind.	Per pupil	District spending	Rank (*)	K-6 average	%± vs. average
1A	Total Spending	$19,697	47	$18,891	4.3%
1	Budgetary Cost	16,171	43	13,649	18.5%
2	Classroom Instruction	9,735	38	8,366	16.4%
6	Support Services	2,505	36	2,161	15.9%
8	Administrative Cost	1,710	36	1,467	16.6%
10	Operations & Maintenance	2,109	49	1,552	35.9%
13	Extracurricular Activities	71	32	39	82.1%
16	Median Teacher Salary	60,635	39	57,437
Data from NJDoE 2014 Taxpayers' Guide to Education Spending. *Of K-6 districts with any number of students. Lowest spending=1; Highest=59

The North Hanover Township School District is a comprehensive community public school district which serves children in pre-Kindergarten through sixth grades from North Hanover Township and from the McGuire Air Force Base unit of Joint Base McGuire-Dix-Lakehurst, in Burlington County, in the U.S. state of New Jersey. The district operates three elementary schools, with two located in Jacobstown and one on the grounds of Joint Base MDL. It is the largest K-6 school district in Burlington County.

As of the 2020–21 school year, the district, comprised of three schools, had an enrollment of 1,127 students and 124.1 classroom teachers (on an FTE basis), for a student–teacher ratio of 9.1:1.

The district is classified by the New Jersey Department of Education as being in District Factor Group "CD", the sixth-highest of eight groupings. District Factor Groups organize districts statewide to allow comparison by common socioeconomic characteristics of the local districts. From lowest socioeconomic status to highest, the categories are A, B, CD, DE, FG, GH, I and J.

Public school students in seventh through twelfth grades attend the schools of the Northern Burlington County Regional School District, which also serves students from Chesterfield Township, Mansfield Township and Springfield Township, along with children of military personnel based at Joint Base McGuire–Dix–Lakehurst. The schools in the district (with 2020–21 enrollment data from the National Center for Education Statistics) are Northern Burlington County Regional Middle School with 743 students in grades 7 - 8 and Northern Burlington County Regional High School with 1,403 students in grades 9-12. Both schools are in the Columbus section of Mansfield Township. The district's 2013-14 budget included $35.6 million in spending which is allocated using a formula that reflects the population and the value of the assessed property in each of the constituent municipalities, under which taxpayers in North Hanover Township pay 14.2% of the district's tax levy.

== History ==
Endeavour School was constructed on Joint Base MDL at a cost of $75 million and opened for the 2019-20 school year, replacing the former Discovery (pre-K and Kindergarten) Atlantis (1st and 2nd grade), and Columbia (3rd and 4th grade). The new Endeavour School will run through fourth grade, reducing the frequent changes of students between buildings every two years, as each school had accommodated two grades.

== Attendance area ==
It is the singular elementary school district for most of the township, except portions on Joint Base McGuire-Dix-Lakehurst, which is listed by the U.S. Census Bureau as having its own school district. Students on portions of the joint base attend area school district public schools, as the Department of Defense Education Activity (DoDEA) does not operate any schools on that base. Students on-post in the McGuire and Dix areas (McGuire Air Force Base and Fort Dix) may attend one of the following in their grade levels, with all siblings in a family taking the same choice: North Hanover Township District (elementary district), Northern Burlington County Regional School District (secondary district), and Pemberton Township School District (K-12).

== Schools ==
Schools in the district (with 2020–21 school enrollment data from the National Center for Education Statistics) are:

- Endeavour Elementary School with 607 students in grades PreK-4 (on Joint Base MDL)
  - Teri Cioffi, principal
  - Jason Danley, principal of Discovery Early Childhood Center
- Clarence B. Lamb Elementary School with 291 students in grades PreK-4 (in Jacobstown)
  - Gerald Paterson, principal
- North Hanover Township Upper Elementary School with 227 students in grades 5-6 (in Jacobstown)
  - April Wawryk, acting principal

== Administration ==
Core members of the district's administration are:

- Helen E. Payne, superintendent
- Amy Lerner, school business administrator and board secretary

== Board of education ==
The district's board of education is comprised of five members who set policy and oversee the fiscal and educational operation of the district through its administration. As a Type II school district, the board's trustees are elected directly by voters to serve three-year terms of office on a staggered basis, with either one or two seats up for election each year held (since 2012) as part of the November general election. The board appoints a superintendent to oversee the district's day-to-day operations and a business administrator to supervise the business functions of the district.
