= Arneytown, New Jersey =

Populated place in Burlington County, New Jersey, US

- Unincorporated community
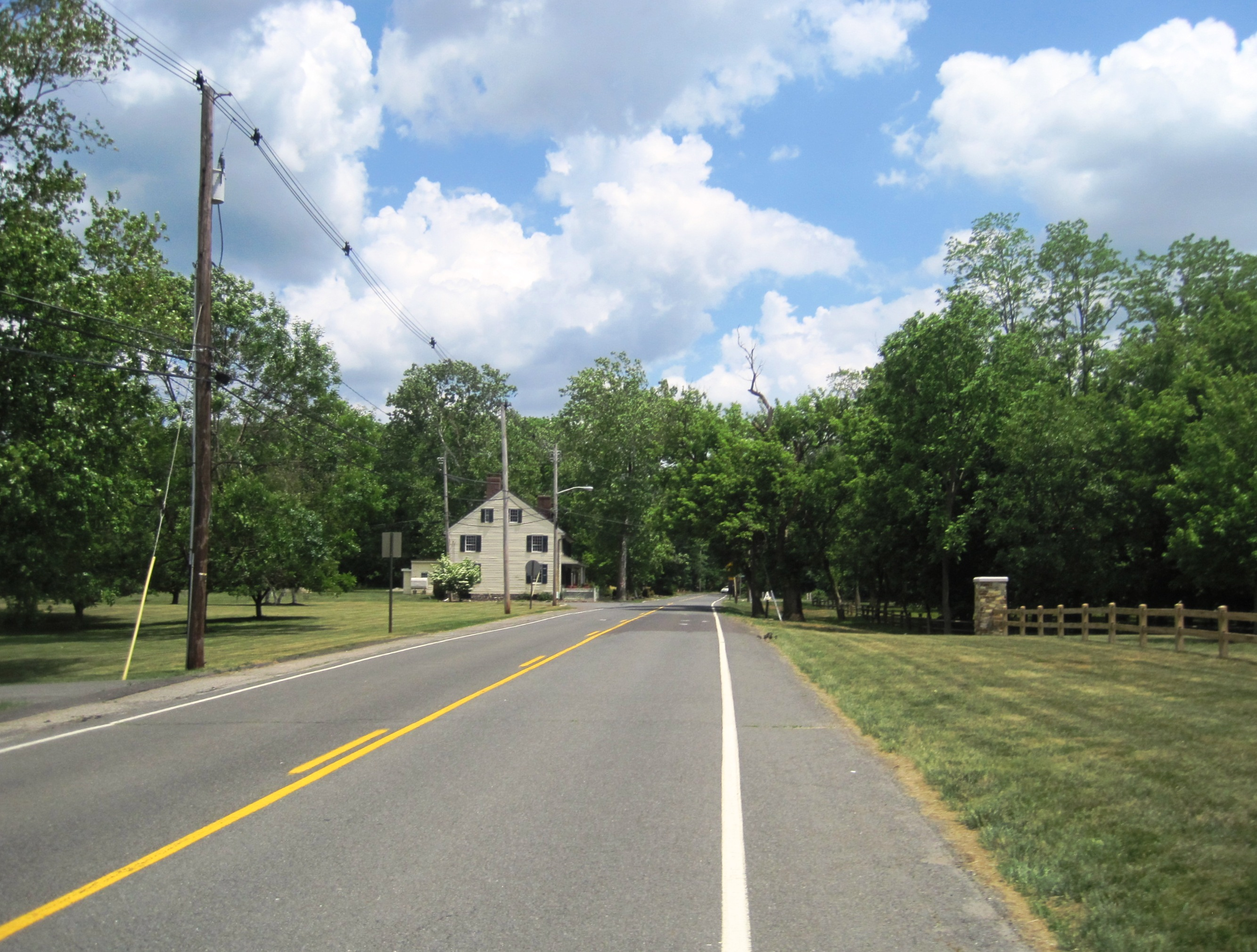
- Approaching the center of Arneytown on eastbound CR 664

- Location within Burlington County, New Jersey Location within Monmouth County, New Jersey Location within New Jersey Location within the United States
- Coordinates: 40°06′05″N 74°33′58″W
- Country: United States
- State: New Jersey
- Counties: Burlington and Monmouth
- Townships: North Hanover and Upper Freehold
- Elevation: 164 ft (50 m)
- Time zone: UTC−05:00 (Eastern (EST))
  - Summer (DST): UTC−04:00 (Eastern (EDT))
- Area codes: 609, 640
- GNIS feature ID: 874381

Arneytown is an unincorporated community located along Province Line Road on the border of North Hanover Township in Burlington County and Upper Freehold Township in Monmouth County of New Jersey. It is two miles (3.2 km) north of Jacobstown. Province Line Road was on the boundary line between the Provinces of East Jersey and West Jersey. The area was once called Upper Freehold by 18th-century Quaker settlers. With the establishment of the first post office in 1827, it became known as Arneytown.

== History ==
The Arneytown Tavern, also known as the Lawrie House, was built c. 1731. It was recorded as a tavern in 1762 when William Lawrie deeded it to Richard Platt.

== Historic district ==
- Arneytown Historic District
- U.S. National Register of Historic Places
- U.S. Historic district
- New Jersey Register of Historic Places
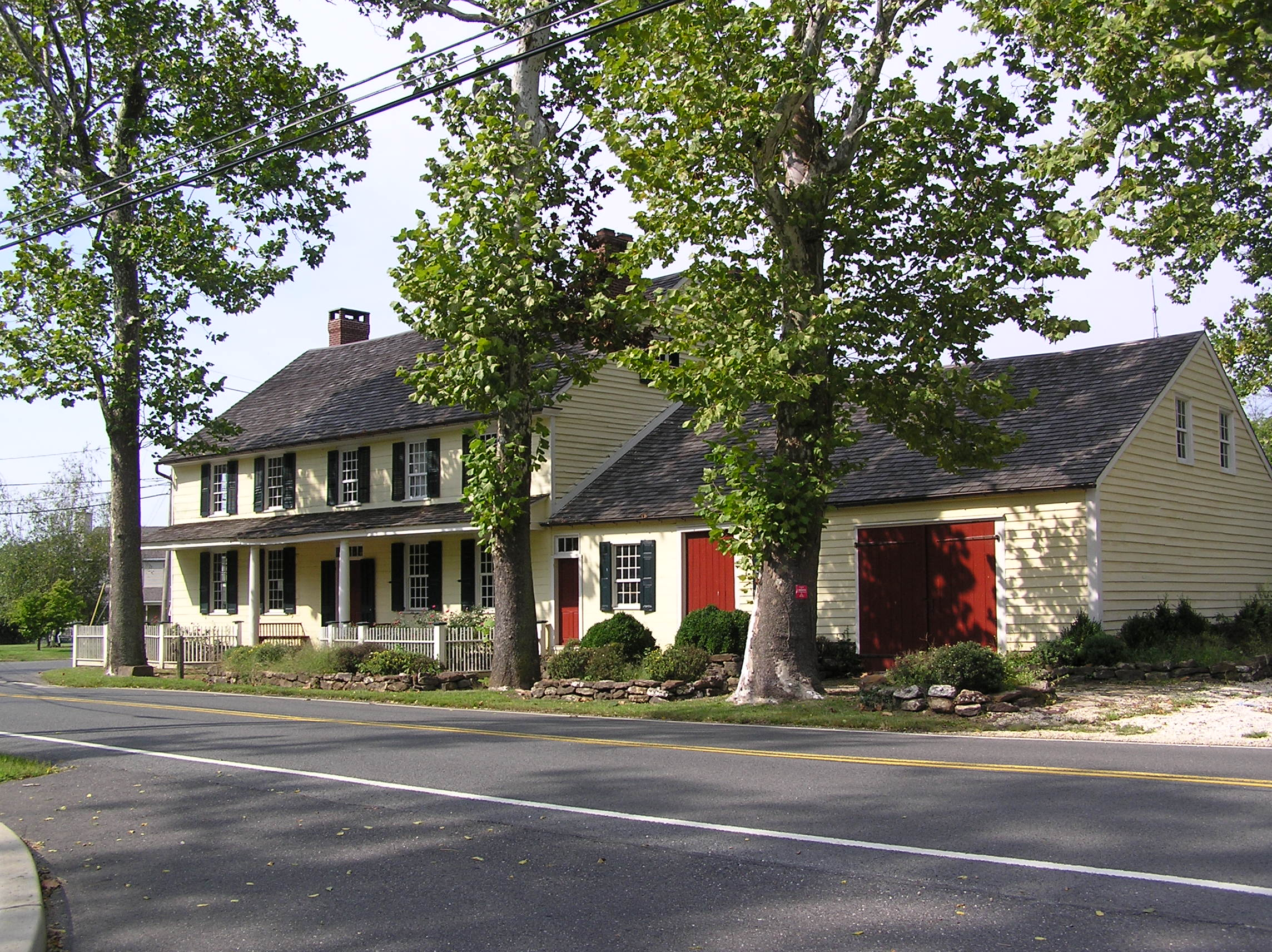
- Lawrie House
- Location: Province Line Road (Ellisdale-Arneytown Road) and Chesterfield-Arneytown Road
- Area: 58 acres (23 ha)
- Built: 1731
- Architectural style: Greek Revival, Georgian
- NRHP reference No.: 67451850
- NJRHP No.: 854

Significant dates
- Added to NRHP: December 12, 1977
- Designated NJRHP: December 26, 1974

The Arneytown Historic District is a 58-acre (23 ha) historic district encompassing the community. It was added to the National Register of Historic Places on December 12, 1977, for its significance in architecture and community development. The district has 12 contributing buildings, including three documented individually by the Historic American Buildings Survey: Lawrie House, Duncan Mackenzie Place, and Emley-Wilde House.

== Cemetery ==
The Brigadier General William C. Doyle Veterans Memorial Cemetery is located south of the community on 225 acres (91 ha) of land. It was dedicated on May 30, 1986, by Governor Thomas Kean, and named after Doyle on January 3, 1989.

== Gallery ==
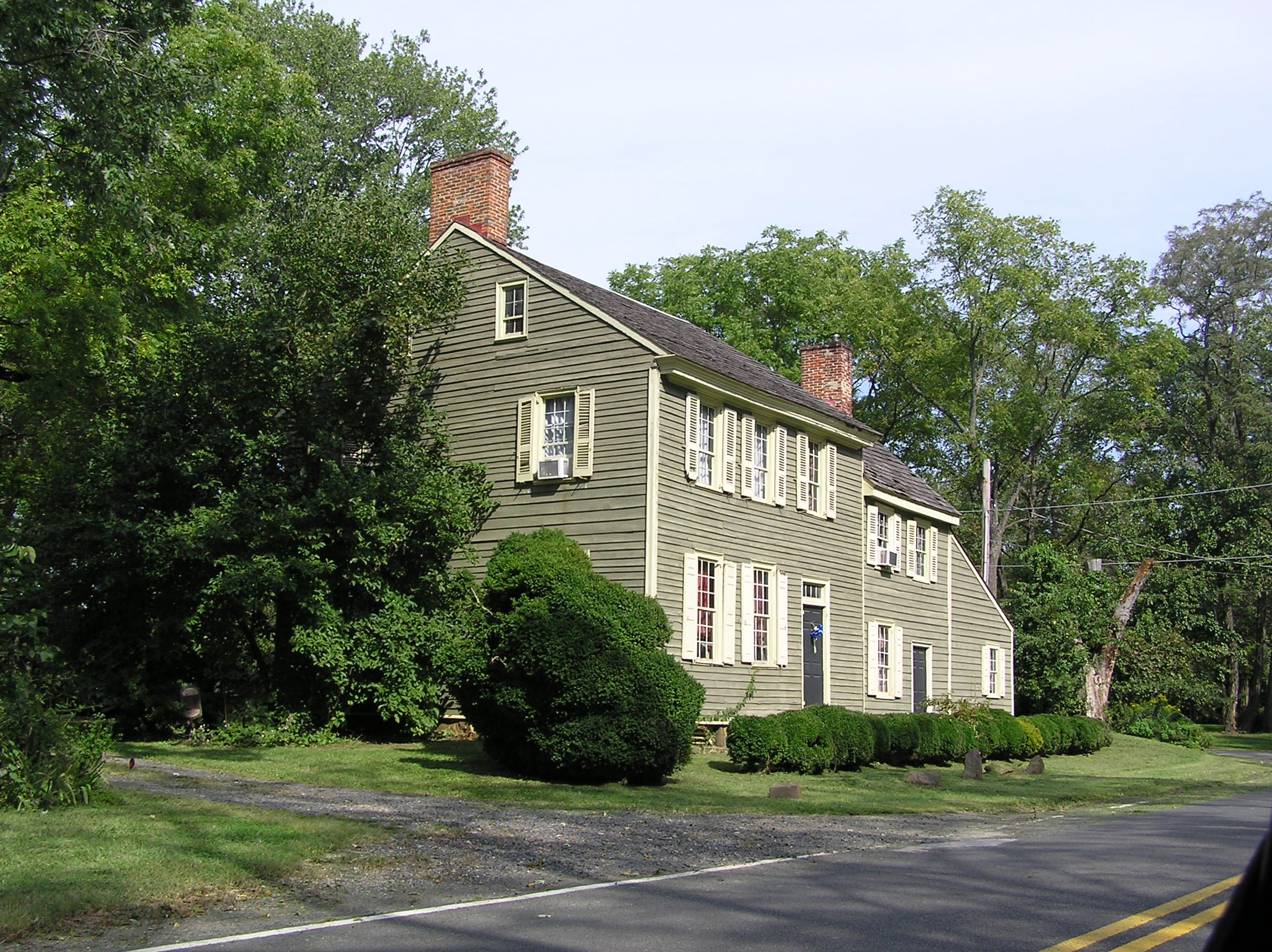
Late 18th-century house

== See also ==
- National Register of Historic Places listings in Burlington County, New Jersey
- National Register of Historic Places listings in Monmouth County, New Jersey
