= Northern Burlington County Regional High School =

High school in Burlington County, New Jersey, US

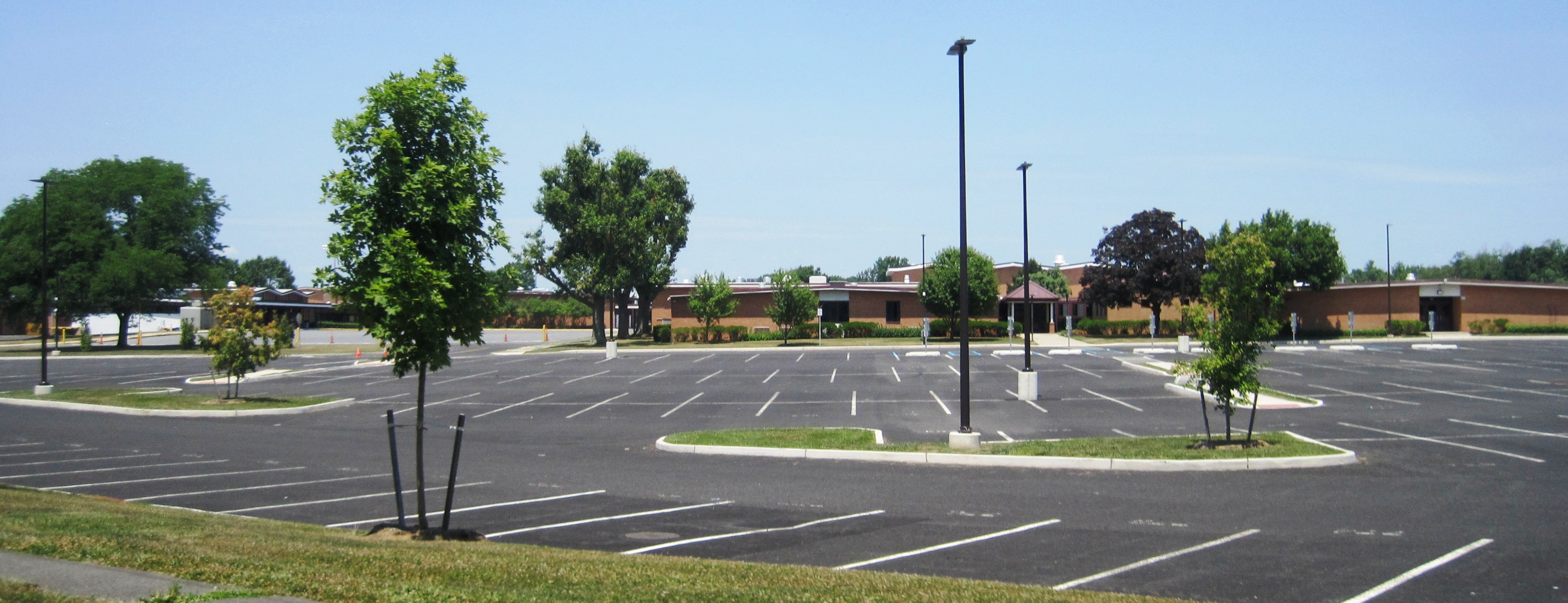

Location
- 160 Mansfield Road East; Mansfield Township, Burlington County, New Jersey 08022; United States; 40.08705°N 74.688366°W

Information
- Type: Public high school
- Motto: Inspire the Desire
- Established: 1960
- School district: Northern Burlington County Regional School District
- NCES School ID: 341170001182
- Principal: Kaitlin McCann
- Faculty: 111.3 FTEs
- Grades: 9-12
- Enrollment: 1,324 (as of 2024–25)
- Student to teacher ratio: 11.9:1
- Colors: Blue and gray
- Athletics conference: Burlington County Scholastic League (general); West Jersey Football League (football)
- Team name: Greyhounds
- Accreditation: Middle States Association of Colleges and Schools
- Publication: Kaleidoscope (literary magazine)
- Newspaper: The Blueprint
- Yearbook: Northern Light
- Website: www.nburlington.com/o/nbc-hs

Northern Burlington County Regional High School is a four-year comprehensive public high school that serves students in ninth through twelfth grades from four communities in Burlington County, in the U.S. state of New Jersey, as part of the Northern Burlington County Regional School District. Students are served from Chesterfield Township, Mansfield Township, North Hanover Township and Springfield Township, along with children of USAF personnel based at McGuire Air Force Base. First opening to students upon the completion of the current building in 1960, the school is located in the Columbus section of Mansfield Township. The school has been accredited by the Middle States Association of Colleges and Schools Commission on Elementary and Secondary Schools since 1966, and is accredited through July 2027.

As of the 2024–25 school year, the school had an enrollment of 1,324 students and 111.3 classroom teachers (on an FTE basis), for a student–teacher ratio of 11.9:1. There were 164 students (12.4% of enrollment) eligible for free lunch and 45 (3.4% of students) eligible for reduced-cost lunch.

== History ==
Constructed with 29 classrooms at a cost of $1.25 million (equivalent to $13.6 million in 2025), the new school opened in September 1960 with 750 students, including 150 children of those stationed at McGuire Air Force Base.

In 1991 the school had over 400 students who lived on-post at McGuire.

== Attendance area ==
It is one of the two high schools which takes in high-school aged dependent students living-on post in these portions of Joint Base McGuire-Dix-Lakehurst: McGuire Air Force Base and Fort Dix.

== Awards, recognition and rankings ==
The school was the 141st-ranked public high school in New Jersey out of 339 schools statewide in New Jersey Monthly magazine's September 2014 cover story on the state's "Top Public High Schools", using a new ranking methodology. The school had been ranked 156th in the state of 328 schools in 2012, after being ranked 186th in 2010 out of 322 schools listed. The magazine ranked the school 153rd in 2008 out of 316 schools. The school was ranked 184th in the magazine's September 2006 issue, which surveyed 316 schools across the state.

Schooldigger.com ranked the school 119th out of 381 public high schools statewide in its 2011 rankings (an increase of 2 positions from the 2010 ranking) which were based on the combined percentage of students classified as proficient or above proficient on the mathematics (86.1%) and language arts literacy (94.8%) components of the High School Proficiency Assessment (HSPA).

== Athletics ==
The Northern Burlington County Regional High School Greyhounds compete in the Liberty Division of the Burlington County Scholastic League (BCSL), which operates under the jurisdiction of the New Jersey State Interscholastic Athletic Association and is comprised of public and private high schools in Burlington, Camden, Mercer and Ocean counties in Central Jersey. With 1,010 students in grades 10-12, the school was classified by the NJSIAA for the 2019–20 school year as Group III for most athletic competition purposes, which included schools with an enrollment of 761 to 1,058 students in that grade range. The school had previously competed in Group II, but the growth in the district's population has resulted in moving up to Group III. The football team competes in the National Division of the 94-team West Jersey Football League superconference and was classified by the NJSIAA as Group IV South for football for 2024–2026, which included schools with 890 to 1,298 students.

The school's mascot is the Greyhound, and colors are blue and grey. In 2013, Northern Burlington's Board of Education officially branded and approved the school "NB" logo and school fight song.

Sectional and district championships

- Baseball - 2015 Central Jersey Group III semifinals
- Baseball - 2013 Central Jersey Group III
- Boys' basketball - 1972-73 South Jersey Group III
- Boys' bowling - 1996-97 South Jersey Group II
- Boys' soccer - 2001 South Jersey Group II
- Boys' track - 2012 Central Jersey Group III
- Field hockey - 1999 Central Jersey Group II
- Girls' basketball - 2003 South Jersey Group II
- Girls' volleyball - 2010 South Jersey Group II
- Golf - 2016 state champions
- Softball - 1980, 1982, 1992, 2002, 2005 South Jersey Group II
- Wrestling - 2000–01, 2004–05, 2005-06 2010–11, 2012–13, 2014-2015 District 25 champions
- Football - 1971 Undefeated (9-0) Delaware Valley League champions
- Football - 1972 Undefeated (9-0) Delaware Valley League champions

State championships / football state sectional titles

- Football - 1980 undefeated South Jersey Group II state champions and 1995 South Jersey Group II state champions (9-2). The 1980 team finished the season with an 11-0 record after winning the South Jersey Group II title by defeating Haddon Township High School by a score of 12-7 in the championship game on a touchdown scored after the clock had run out. The 1995 team came back from 10 points down to win the South Jersey Group II state title by a score of 20-17 in the championship game against Kingsway Regional High School.
- Girls' basketball - 2003 Group II state championship vs. Newton High School. 2003 South Jersey Group II vs. Haddonfield Memorial High School.
- Softball - 2002 Group II state championship vs. Pompton Lakes High School

== Extracurricular activities ==
Northern Burlington offers about 50 clubs for students to partake in. Some of these clubs include Interact, a community ethics club, where students join forces to help the community, such as Ten Thousand Villages Sale, Relay for Life, Care Bags for Kids, nursing home party. Another example being Video Club where students talk and help produce Northern TV, Northern's own television station which provides news to its sending districts.

== Special Education Program ==
The Special Education Program at Northern Burlington Regional High School focuses on the promotion of tolerance and appreciation of diversity of all variations. The Northern Burlington Regional High School provides Special Education students with a multitude of programs, such as in-class support, a variety of resource classrooms, replacement classes customized to the individual's particular needs as well as a Multiple Disabilities/Autistic program. The Northern Burlington Regional High School has established a Special Services Department, including Speech, Language and Behavioral Therapists, Instructional Assists as well as Special Education teachers at both the middle and high school levels.

== Administration ==
The school's principal is Kaitlin McCann. Her core administration team includes three assistant principals.

== Notable alumni ==
- Antron Brown (born 1976), NHRA drag racer
- Willie Drewrey (born 1963, class of 1981), former wide receiver who played in the NFL for nine seasons for the Houston Oilers and Tampa Bay Buccaneers
- Michael Haynes (born 1980), defensive lineman who played in the NFL for the Chicago Bears and New York Jets
- Cedric Jackson (born 1986), basketball player who has played in the NBA for the Cleveland Cavaliers, San Antonio Spurs and Washington Wizards
