= Joe Borden =

American baseball player (1854–1929)

- Pitcher
- Born: May 9, 1854; Jacobstown, New Jersey, U.S.
- Died: October 14, 1929 (aged 75); Yeadon, Pennsylvania, U.S.
- Batted: Right Threw: Right

Major-league debut
- July 24, 1875, for the Philadelphia White Stockings

Last major-league appearance
- July 19, 1876, for the Boston Red Caps

Major-league statistics
- Win–loss record: 13–16
- Earned run average: 2.56
- Strikeouts: 43
- Stats at Baseball Reference

Teams
- Philadelphia White Stockings (1875); Boston Red Caps (1876)

Career highlights and awards
- Threw two no-hitters: July 28, 1875 (the first ever no-hitter in a professional game) and May 23, 1876; Winning pitcher in the first National League game, on April 22, 1876

Joseph Emley Borden, aka Joe Josephs, (May 9, 1854 – October 14, 1929), nicknamed "Josephus the Phenomenal", was an American professional baseball starting pitcher for two seasons. Born in the Jacobstown section of North Hanover Township, New Jersey, he was playing for a Philadelphia amateur team when he was discovered by the Philadelphia White Stockings of the National Association (NA) in 1875. The White Stockings needed a replacement for a recently released pitcher, and were awaiting the arrival of a replacement. During his short, seven-game stint with the team, he posted a 2–4 win–loss record, both victories recorded as shutouts. On July 28 of that season, he threw what is thought to be the first no-hitter in professional baseball history.

When the NA folded after the 1875 season, Borden signed a three-year contract with the Boston Red Caps. On April 22, 1876, Borden and the Red Caps were victorious in the first National League (NL) game ever played. Later that season, on May 23, he pitched a shutout, which some historians claim was the first no-hitter in Major League Baseball. Known for having an eccentric personality, he played under different surnames, such as Josephs and Nedrob, so as to disguise his involvement in baseball; his prominent family would have disapproved had they known. After he was released from the Red Caps as a player during the first season of his contract, he worked for a short period of time as their groundskeeper until he and the owner agreed to a buyout of the remainder of his contract. It was mistakenly claimed that he died in 1889, in the Johnstown Flood. His official death date is recognized as occurring in 1929 when he was 75 years of age.

== Early life ==
Joseph Emley Borden was born on May 9, 1854, in Jacobstown in North Hanover Township, New Jersey into a wealthy family. The fourth of John H. and Sarah Ann (Emley) Borden's six children, his father was a shoe manufacturer. Borden moved to Philadelphia in 1870. He joined the J.B. Doerr club by 1875, an amateur baseball club that played several teams around Philadelphia. It is claimed that his family would have been embarrassed that their son was playing baseball for money, and would have disapproved. To hide his playing career, he assumed several various last names, such as Josephs and Nedrob, which is Borden spelled backwards.

== Career ==
=== 1875 season ===
The Philadelphia White Stockings, of the NA, had recently dismissed pitcher Cherokee Fisher in July 1875 due to his clashing with team captain, Mike McGeary, and were in need of a replacement. The White Stockings signed George Zettlein, but there was a delay in his arrival. The team then signed Borden, who was a local Philadelphia amateur player, as a replacement until Zettlein arrived. His first appearance in a game for the White Stockings was on July 24, an 11–4 loss to Dick McBride and the Philadelphia Athletics.

In his next start, on July 28 against the Chicago White Stockings, he pitched the first recorded no-hitter in professional baseball history. Borden lost the next three games he started before defeating the St. Louis Brown Stockings, and future Hall of Fame pitcher Pud Galvin, 16–0 on August 9. By this time, Zettlein had settled in as their regular pitcher, and Borden was no longer needed. During his time with the White Stockings, he pitched in seven games, all of which he started and completed. He finished the season with a 2–4 win–loss record, two shutouts, a 1.50 earned run average in 66 innings pitched.

=== 1876 season ===
After the 1875 season concluded, the league, and subsequently the Philadelphia White Stockings, folded, allowing the NL to form. Before the season, Borden signed a three-year contract worth $2000 a season ($60,470 current dollar adjustment) with the Boston Red Caps of the NL. The club had high expectations that he could adequately replace Albert Spalding who had recently departed for the Chicago White Stockings. Sportswriters were in agreement with the club and dubbed him "Josephus the Phenomenal". Hall of Fame baseball writer Henry Chadwick described Borden's pitching style as having speed, but with little strategy. In addition to his swiftly moving fastball, he also delivered a curveball that moved down and away from right-handed batters; both pitches he delivered from a low arm angle. His Red Caps played the Philadelphia Athletics in the first game in NL history on April 22; the only game of the day due to rain cancelling the rest of the league's schedule. The Red Caps defeated the Athletics with two runs in the ninth inning, and a final score of 6–5 at Athletic Park, with Borden pitching the complete game for the victory.

On May 23, Borden pitched a two-hit 8–0 shutout victory against the Cincinnati Reds. Various historians claim that this performance was, instead, the first no-hitter thrown in the NL, thus the first in major-league history. According to Lee Allen, baseball historian and writer, the scorecard shows that Borden gave up two bases on balls, which were counted as hits in the final score. The official scorekeeper for the game was O. P. Caylor, a writer for The Cincinnati Enquirer, who believed, unlike his contemporaries, that bases on balls should be scored as hits. Bases on balls were only officially counted as hits for the 1887 season. The Boston Daily Globe reported on the game the following day, and noted that Reds had had two clean one-base hits during the game. Furthermore, on June 6, the New York Clipper did not report an occurrence of a no-hitter in their summary of the game, though the box score did have differing stats in other categories than what the Daily Globe had reported. Consequently, the first official no-hitter in major-league history was pitched by George Bradley, of the St. Louis Brown Stockings on July 15, 1876.

Two days after his near no-hitter, on May 25, Borden and the Red Caps faced the Reds again; this time against Cherokee Fisher, resulting in a scoreless game through nine innings. The Red Caps scored four runs in tenth inning for a 4–0 victory. Unfortunately for Borden, his pitching effectiveness declined rapidly after this, and at one point he reportedly lost his temper during a game in response to his own ineffectiveness, admonishing his teammates, even the well-liked and good-natured future Hall of famer George Wright. Due to his erratic pitching and behavior, he was released from the team by August. In 29 games pitched during the 1876 season, he started 24, completed 16, and recorded two shutouts. Additionally, he had an 11–12 win–loss record, a 2.89 earned run average in 218⅓ innings pitched, and led the league in allowing 51 bases on balls.

== Post-baseball career ==
Though the Red Caps had released him as a player, he was still under contract, so they had him work in various other capacities, such as a ticket-taker and groundskeeper. Eventually, team owner Nicholas Apollonio agreed to pay Borden approximately three-quarters of the two remaining years of his contract, and released him from the team. Borden reportedly found work stitching baseballs in Philadelphia. He later moved to West Chester, Pennsylvania and found work making shoes and boots. During the summer of 1883, he joined the semiprofessional Brandywine Base Ball Club, where he pitched and hit 1-for-11 in two victories.

It was mistakenly claimed that he died in May 1889 during the Johnstown Flood, the same disaster that had stranded the entire Louisville Colonels team. The Sporting Life magazine corrected the error in its June 19 issue, stating he was alive and living in Philadelphia. On February 7, 1891, Borden married Henrietta S. Evans, the daughter of publisher Henry S. Evans. The couple had two children, Richard, who died as a baby, and Lavinia. Borden worked as a banker with the Guarantee Trust and Safe Deposit Company and the Philadelphia representative for the U.S. Shipping Board. He was an amateur boxer and trained at Philadelphia Boxing Academy. He also kept hunting dogs and won exhibitions. Borden died in Yeadon, Pennsylvania at the age of 75, and is interred at Oaklands Cemetery in West Chester, Pennsylvania.

Achievements
Preceded by None	No-hitter pitcher July 28, 1875; May 23, 1876 (not recognized by MLB)	Succeeded by George Bradley
