= County Route 528 (New Jersey) =

Highway in New Jersey, U.S.

County Route 528
- CR 528 highlighted in red

Route information
- Length: 39.89 mi (64.20 km)

Major junctions
- West end: CR 545 in Bordentown
- US 130 / US 206 in Bordentown; CR 537 in North Hanover Township; CR 539 in Plumsted Township; CR 571 in Jackson Township; CR 527 in Jackson Township; CR 547 in Jackson Township; US 9 in Lakewood Township; G.S. Parkway in Lakewood Township; Route 70 in Brick Township; CR 549 in Brick Township
- East end: Route 35 in Mantoloking

Location
- Country: United States
- State: New Jersey
- Counties: Burlington, Ocean

Highway system
- County routes in New Jersey; 500-series routes
← CR 527	→ CR 529

County Route 528 (CR 528) is a county highway in the U.S. state of New Jersey. The highway is designated 39.89 miles (64.20 km) from Farnsworth Avenue (CR 545) in Bordentown to Ocean Avenue (Route 35) in Mantoloking. The eastern end of the highway sustained extensive damage in 2012 when an inlet opened between Barnegat Bay and the Atlantic Ocean during Hurricane Sandy, scouring away the road east of the Mantoloking Bridge. The bridge and Route 35 intersection fully reopened in February 2013.

== Route description ==
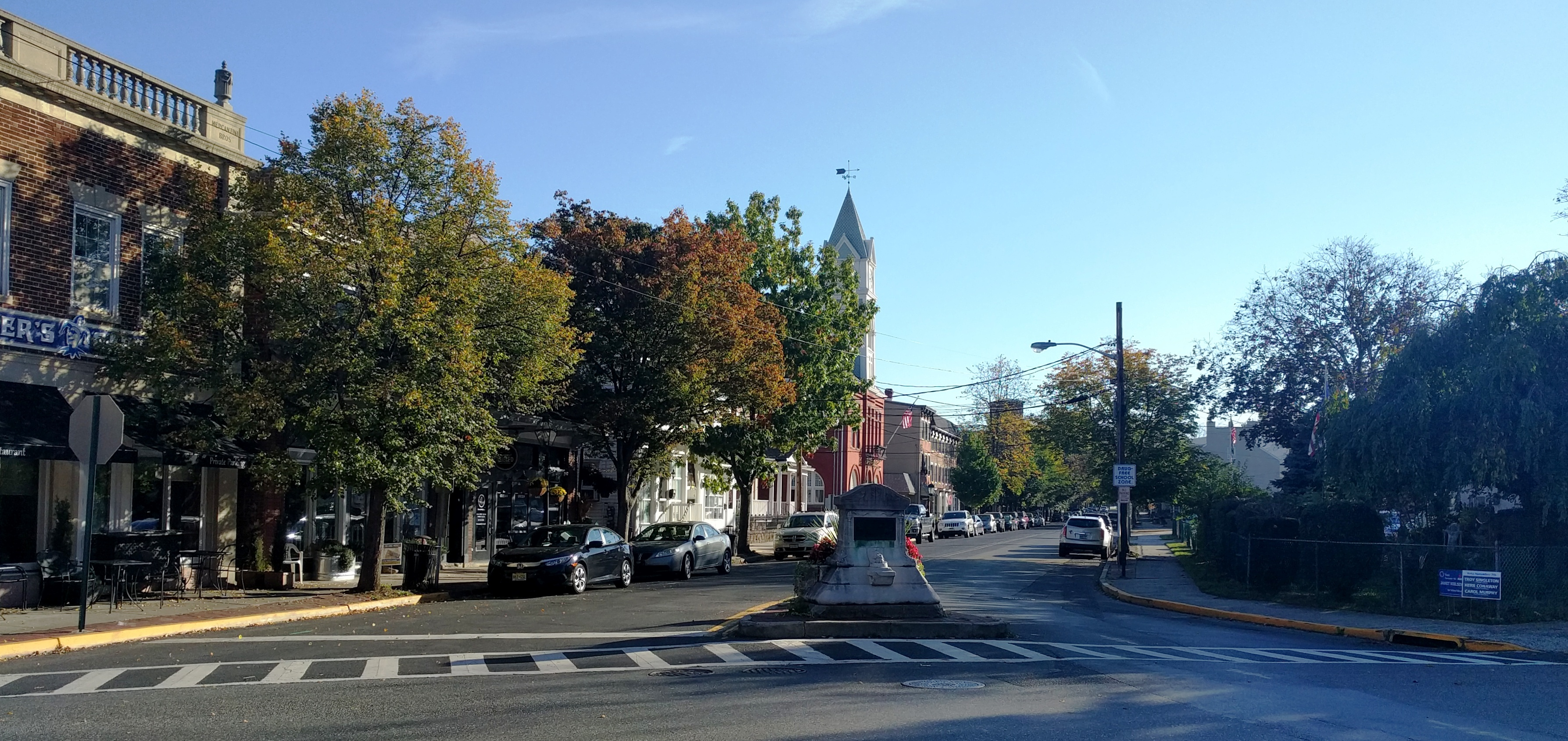
CR 528's western terminus in downtown Bordentown

CR 528 begins at an intersection with CR 545 in Bordentown, Burlington County, heading east on two-lane undivided Crosswicks Street through areas of homes and businesses. The route crosses US 130/US 206 in commercial areas before continuing into Bordentown Township and passing a mix of farm fields, businesses, and residential neighborhoods. The road enters Chesterfield Township, turning southeast and crossing over the New Jersey Turnpike (I-95) before reaching a junction with CR 672. CR 528 then passes through farmland and wooded areas, with some homes, intersecting CR 660 at a roundabout and CR 677. After the junction with the latter, the road turns east in residential areas before passing more agricultural areas. The route turns southeast onto Jacobstown-Chesterfield Road at the CR 664 intersection and continues through areas of farmland, woodland, and residences as it crosses into North Hanover Township. CR 528 briefly joins with CR 665 at Jacobstown as it turns east into a mix of woods and homes as Jacobstown Road, turning southeast again to intersect CR 537, where CR 528 Truck heads east along CR 537. Past CR 537, the route continues into a mix of agricultural and wooded areas.

CR 528 continues into Plumsted Township in Ocean County, continuing into the community of New Egypt, where the road passes homes and businesses. After intersecting CR 616, the route heads east onto Main Street and passes through the commercial downtown of New Egypt before turning northeast near more homes. CR 528 leaves New Egypt by heading east on Lakewood Road, with CR 10 continuing northeast along Main Street. The road continues through rural residential areas as it reaches a junction with CR 539 and the eastern terminus of CR 528 Truck. From here, the route enters forested areas of the Pine Barrens with some residences, crossing into Jackson Township at the CR 640 intersection. CR 528 becomes West Veterans Highway and heads east to an intersection with CR 571 in the community of Cassville. From this point, the road runs through more residential sections of the Pine Barrens before coming to the CR 527 junction. At this point, CR 528 heads southeast concurrent with CR 527, with CR 636 heading east. The road passes near more wooded areas of homes before turning east and passing to the south of a lake. CR 527 splits from CR 528 by heading south on Whitesville Road, with CR 528 continuing east as East Veterans Highway. Farther east, the route intersects CR 547 and CR 639, where CR 547 turns east to form a concurrency with CR 528. The two routes continues through residential and commercial development, intersecting CR 626 before crossing into Lakewood Township. At this point, CR 528/CR 547 becomes Lakewood-New Egypt Road and turns northeast into wooded residential neighborhoods. In this area, the routes turn east onto Central Avenue and passes more homes before crossing Lake Carasaljo and coming to an intersection with US 9.

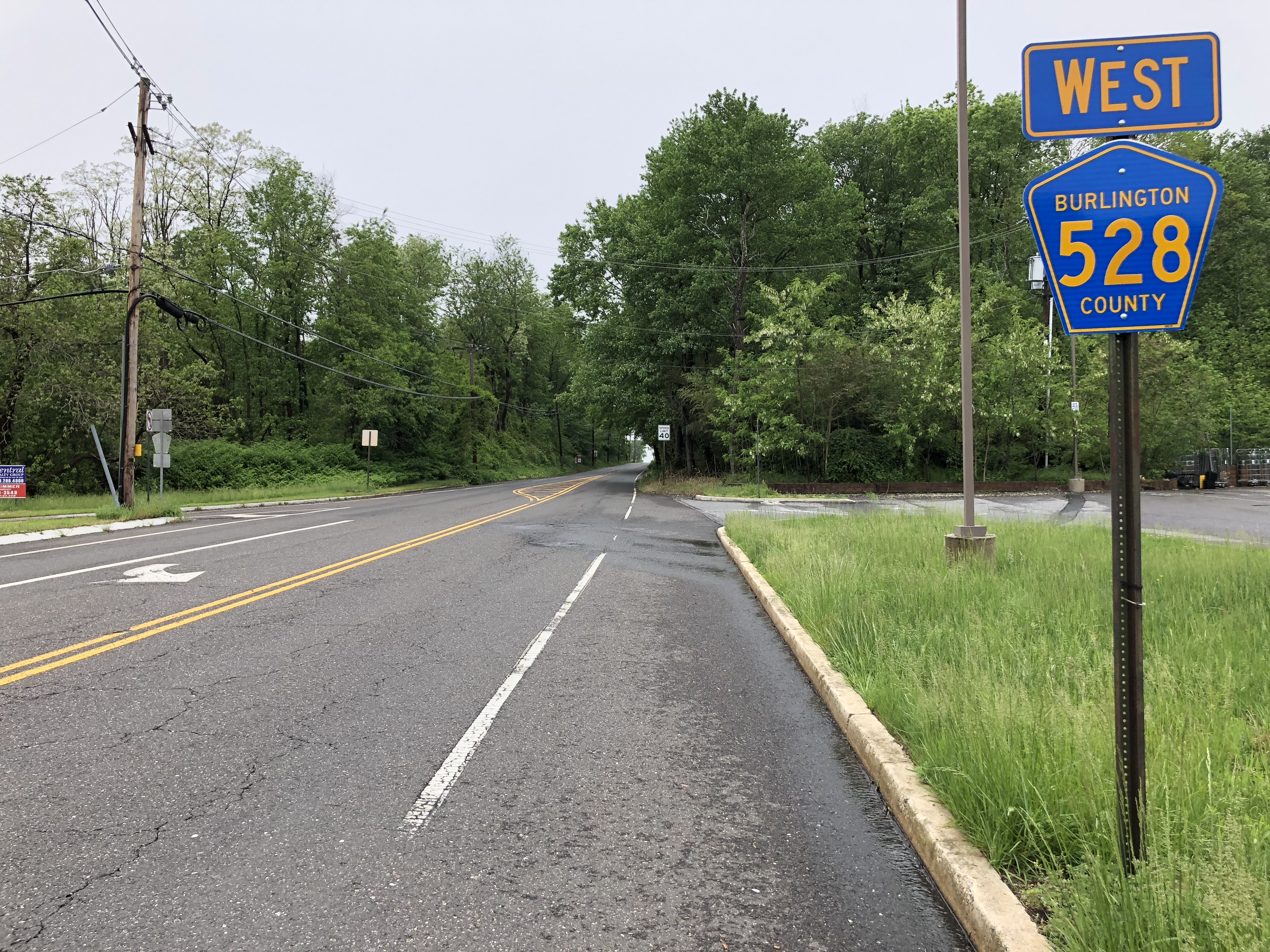
View west along CR 528 at CR 537 in North Hanover

At this point, CR 528 continues northeast on Hurley Avenue and CR 547 turns north to follow US 9 on Madison Avenue. The route turns east-southeast onto Cedar Bridge Avenue a short distance later and widens to four lanes. After crossing the Southern Secondary railroad line operated by the Delaware and Raritan River Railroad, the road continues through commercial, residential, forested and then commercial areas again prior to reaching the CR 623 junction at ShoreTown Ballpark, the home ballpark of the Jersey Shore BlueClaws baseball team. The road passes through industrial areas and passes to the north of Lakewood Airport prior to reaching a partial interchange with the Garden State Parkway's exit 89 that has access to and from the northbound direction of the parkway. Following this interchange, the route heads southeast into Brick Township and runs through woods before passing businesses as it comes to the Route 70 intersection. At this point, CR 528 gains a center left-turn lane and continues through commercial areas as it crosses CR 549 and CR 631. After the CR 631 junction, the road narrows to two lanes and passes a mix of homes and businesses as Mantoloking Road, running a short distance to the south of the Metedeconk River. The route intersects CR 624 and passes more residences before it enters areas of woods and marshland. CR 528 crosses the Barnegat Bay on the Mantoloking Bridge, a drawbridge. After crossing the Barnegat Bay, the route enters Mantoloking and becomes Herbert Street for a very short period, passing resort homes before ending at Route 35 near the Atlantic Ocean.

== History ==
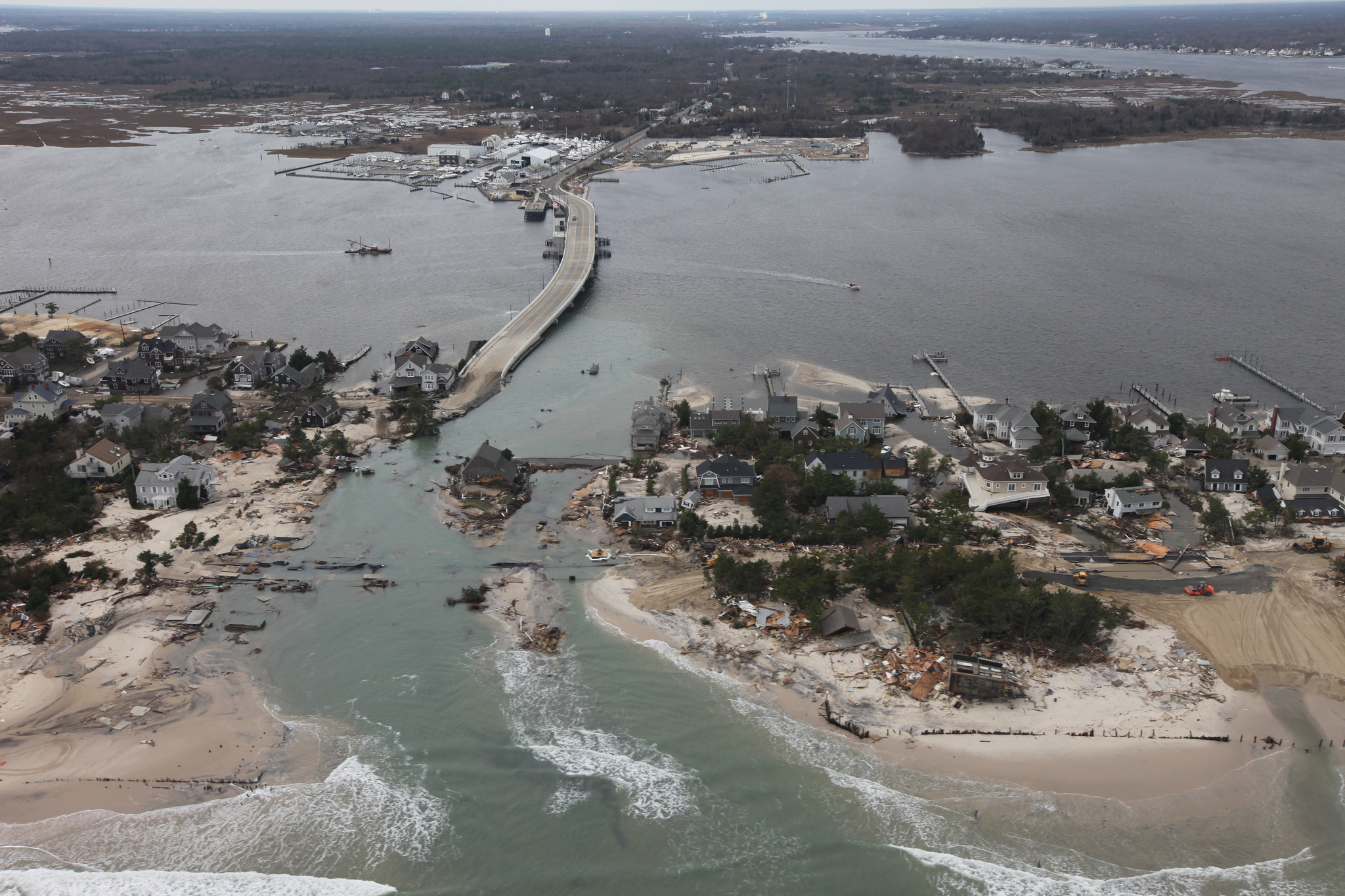
Aerial photo at eastern terminus of CR 528 at Route 35 in Mantoloking showing damage after Hurricane Sandy

West of Chesterfield, the road was maintained by the Bordentown and Crosswicks Turnpike Company, chartered in 1854. Its main road went from Bordentown east to Crosswicks along modern-day Bordentown-Crosswicks Road; a spur was planned to reach New Egypt, but only reached Chesterfield.

CR 528 from Jacobstown to Lakewood was signed as part of the Camp Dix Way, an auto trail stretching from Camden to Seaside Heights. CR 528 was designated in 1952. A spur route, County Route 528 Spur, existed, which is now Burlington County Route 670, Burlington County Route 616, and Ocean County Route 616.

In the aftermath of Hurricane Sandy in October 2012, much of the Herbert Street section of CR 528, the adjacent portion of Route 35, and the surrounding area in Mantoloking were destroyed when a new inlet between Barnegat Bay and the Atlantic Ocean opened around the eastern base of the bridge over the bay. The bridge and Route 35 intersection fully reopened in February 2013.

== Major intersections ==
County	Location	mi	km	Destinations	Notes
Burlington	Bordentown	0.00	0.00	CR 545 (Farnsworth Avenue)	Western terminus
Burlington	Bordentown	0.53	0.85	US 130 / US 206 – Trenton, New Brunswick, Hammonton, Camden	
Burlington	North Hanover Township	9.87	15.88	CR 537 / CR 528 Truck east (Monmouth Road)	Western terminus of CR 528 Truck
Ocean	Plumsted Township	14.75	23.74	CR 539 / CR 528 Truck west (Pinehurst Road) – Manchester, Trenton	Eastern terminus of CR 528 Truck
Ocean	Jackson Township	19.92	32.06	CR 571 (Cassville Road / Toms River Road)	
Ocean	Jackson Township	22.46	36.15	CR 527 north (Cedar Swamp Road) – Trenton	West end of CR 527 overlap
Ocean	Jackson Township	26.20	42.16	CR 527 south (Whitesville Road) – Toms River	East end of CR 527 overlap
Ocean	Jackson Township	27.33	43.98	CR 547 south (Hope Chapel Road) – Manchester	West end of CR 547 overlap
Ocean	Lakewood Township	30.25	48.68	US 9 / CR 547 north (River Avenue)	East end of CR 547 overlap
Ocean	Lakewood Township	33.51	53.93	G.S. Parkway north	Exit 89 (GSP); access to GSP northbound and from GSP southbound only
Ocean	Brick Township	34.54	55.59	Route 70	
Ocean	Brick Township	34.94	56.23	CR 549 (Brick Boulevard) – Point Pleasant, Toms River	
Ocean	Mantoloking	39.89	64.20	Route 35 (Ocean Avenue) – Point Pleasant, Seaside Park	Eastern terminus
1.000 mi = 1.609 km; 1.000 km = 0.621 mi: Concurrency terminus; Incomplete access

== CR 528 Truck ==
County Route 528 Truck
- Location: New Egypt
- Length: 5.64 mi (9.08 km)

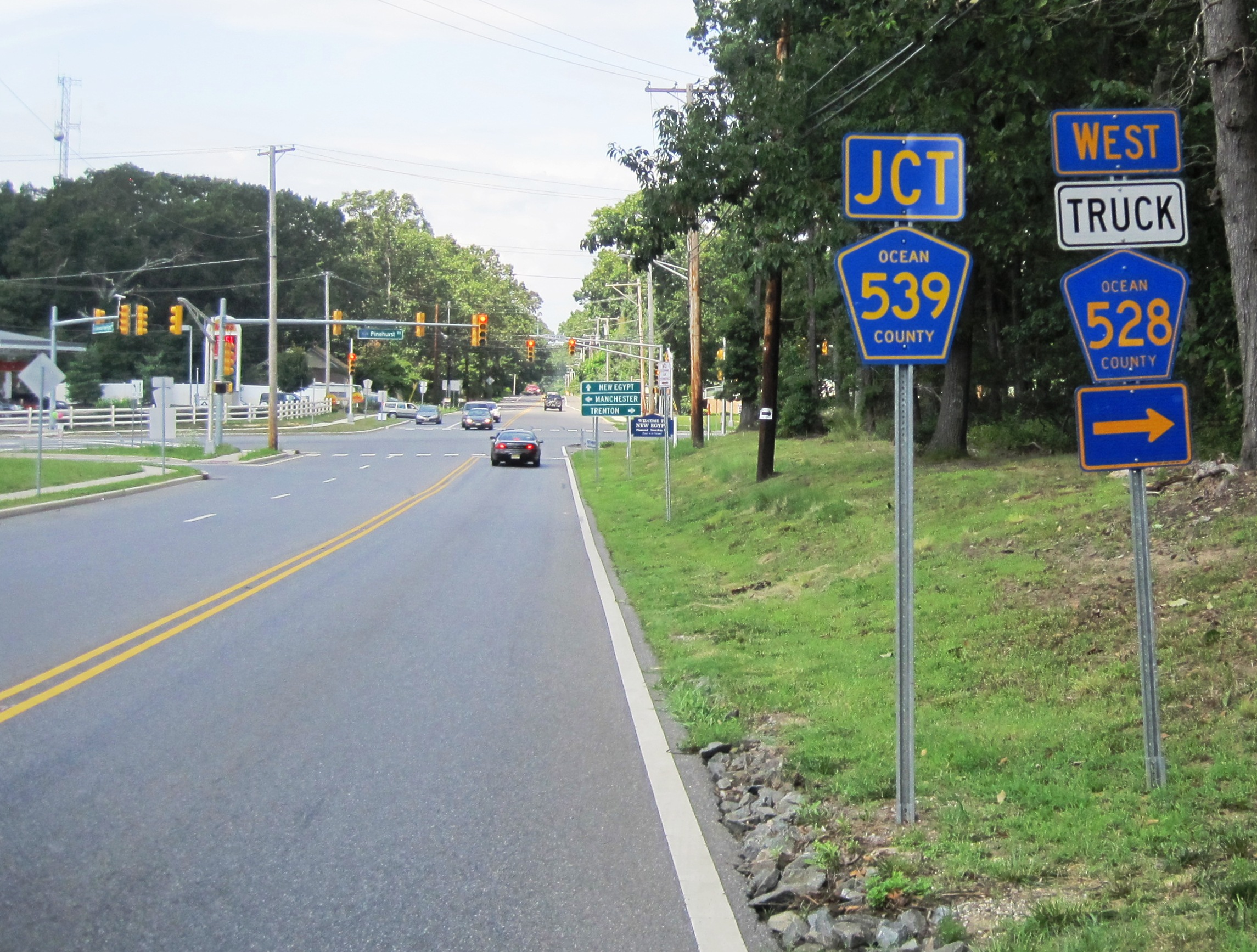
CR 528 westbound approaching its intersection with CR 539 and CR 528 Truck in Plumsted Township

CR 528 Truck is a 5.64-mile-long (9.08 km) signed truck route of CR 528 that bypasses New Egypt. The route begins in North Hanover Township, Burlington County at the intersection of CR 528 and CR 537. CR 528 Truck heads northeast along CR 537 where it exits Burlington County and forms the border between Upper Freehold Township, Monmouth County and Plumsted Township, Ocean County. At CR 539, CR 528 Truck turns south onto CR 539 and ends at its intersection with CR 528 east of New Egypt.

Major intersections

County	Location	mi	km	Destinations	Notes
Burlington	North Hanover Township	0.00	0.00	CR 528 (New Egypt Road) CR 537 west (Monmouth Road)	Western terminus, west end of CR 537 overlap
Monmouth–Ocean county line	Upper Freehold–Plumsted township line	3.65	5.87	CR 537 east (Monmouth Road) – Freehold CR 539 north (Hornerstown-Whiting Road) – Allentown	East end of CR 537 overlap, west end of CR 539 overlap
Ocean	Plumsted Township	5.64	9.08	CR 528 (Lakewood-New Egypt Road) – Lakewood, New Egypt CR 539 south (Pinehurst Road) – Manchester	Eastern terminus, east end of CR 539 overlap
1.000 mi = 1.609 km; 1.000 km = 0.621 mi
