= North Hanover Township, New Jersey =

Township in Burlington County, New Jersey, US

- Township
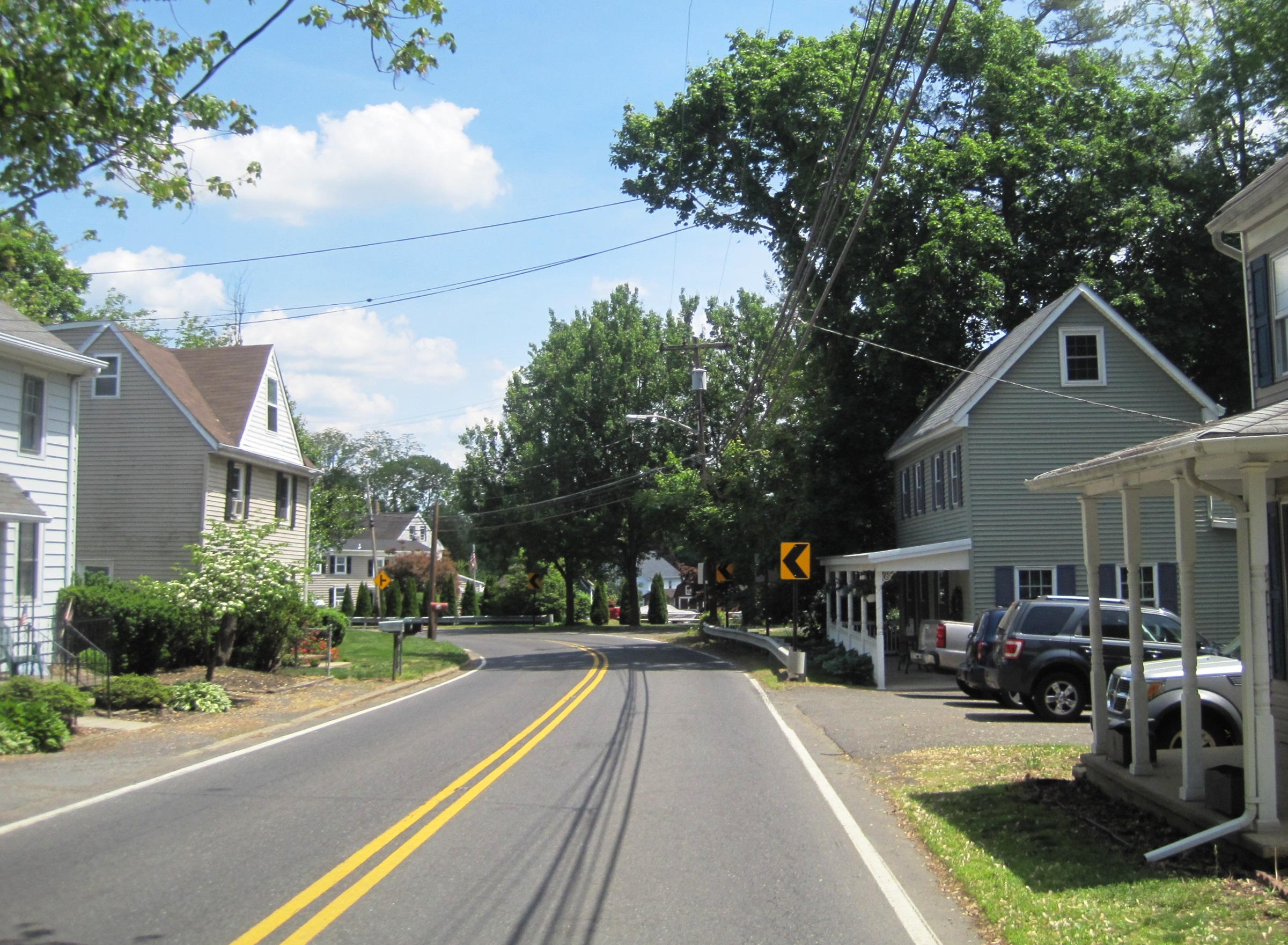
- Jacobstown, a settlement within the township

- Seal

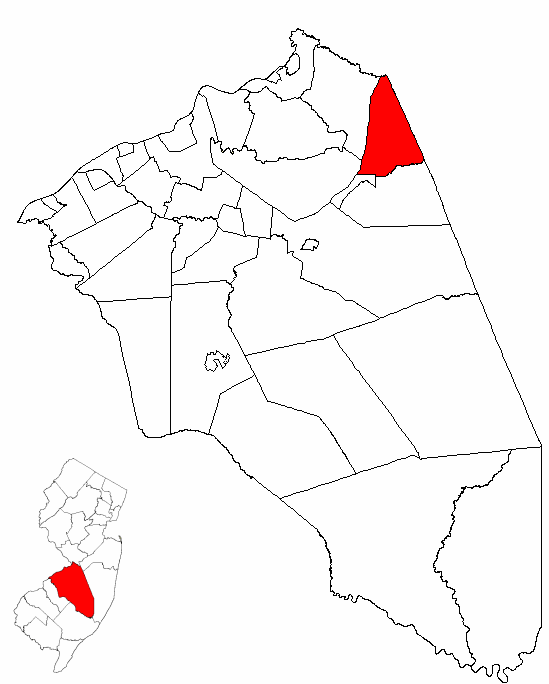
- North Hanover Township highlighted in Burlington County. Inset map: Burlington County highlighted in the State of New Jersey.

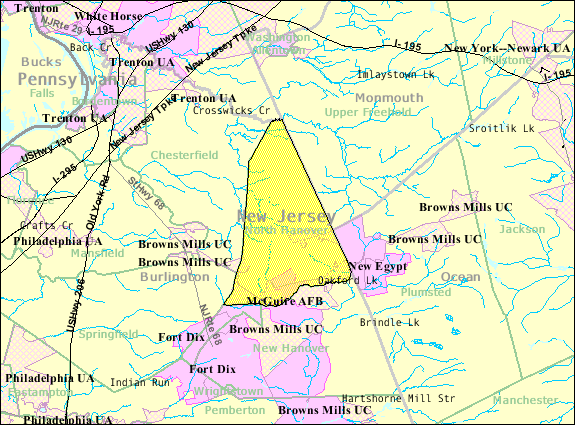
- Census Bureau map of North Hanover Township, New Jersey

- Location in Burlington County Location in New Jersey Location in the United States
- Coordinates: 40.089961°N 74.585444°W
- Country: United States
- State: New Jersey
- County: Burlington
- Incorporated: April 12, 1905

Government
  - Type: Township
  - Body: Township Committee
  - Mayor: David Forsyth Jr. (R, term ends December 31, 2023)
  - Municipal clerk: Mary Picariello

Area
  - Total: 17.51 sq mi (45.35 km^{2})
  - Land: 17.37 sq mi (44.98 km^{2})
  - Water: 0.14 sq mi (0.37 km^{2}) 0.81%
  - Rank: 164th of 565 in state 15th of 40 in county
- Elevation: 154 ft (47 m)

Population (2020)
  - Total: 7,963
  - Estimate (2023): 8,007
  - Rank: 294th of 565 in state 22nd of 40 in county
  - Density: 458.5/sq mi (177.0/km^{2})
  - Rank: 445th of 565 in state 28th of 40 in county
- Time zone: UTC−05:00 (Eastern (EST))
  - Summer (DST): UTC−04:00 (Eastern (EDT))
- ZIP Code: 08562
- Area code: 609 exchanges: 723, 724, 752, 758
- FIPS code: 3400553070
- GNIS feature ID: 0882087
- Website: www.northhanovertwp.com

North Hanover Township is a township in Burlington County, in the U.S. state of New Jersey. As of the 2020 United States census, the township's population was 7,963, an increase of 285 (+3.7%) from the 2010 census count of 7,678, which in turn reflected an increase of 331 (+4.5%) from the 7,347 counted in the 2000 census. The township, and all of Burlington County, is a part of the Philadelphia metropolitan area.

North Hanover Township was incorporated as a township by an act of the New Jersey Legislature on April 12, 1905, from portions of New Hanover Township. Portions of the township were taken on March 4, 1918, to form Wrightstown.

== Geography ==
According to the United States Census Bureau, the township had a total area of 17.51 square miles (45.35 km^{2}), including 17.37 square miles (44.98 km^{2}) of land and 0.14 square miles (0.37 km^{2}) of water (0.81%).

McGuire Air Force Base is an unincorporated community and census-designated place (CDP) located in portions of both New Hanover Township and North Hanover Township that had a 2010 Census total population of 3,710, of which 2,973 were in the North Hanover portion of the CDP and 737 were in New Hanover.

Other unincorporated communities, localities and place names located partially or completely within the township include Arneytown, Ellisdale, Jacobstown, Sykesville and Wrightstown.

The township borders Chesterfield Township, New Hanover Township and Springfield Township in Burlington County; Hamilton Township in Mercer County; Upper Freehold Township in Monmouth County; and Plumsted Township in Ocean County.

The township is one of 56 South Jersey municipalities that are included within the New Jersey Pinelands National Reserve, a protected natural area of unique ecology covering 1,100,000 acres (450,000 ha), that has been classified as a United States Biosphere Reserve and established by Congress in 1978 as the nation's first National Reserve. Part of the township is included in the state-designated Pinelands Area, which includes portions of Burlington County, along with areas in Atlantic, Camden, Cape May, Cumberland, Gloucester and Ocean counties.

== Demographics ==
Historical population
Census	Pop.	Note	%±
1910	696		—
1920	651	*	−6.5%
1930	675		3.7%
1940	731		8.3%
1950	1,155		58.0%
1960	2,796		142.1%
1970	9,858		252.6%
1980	9,050		−8.2%
1990	9,994		10.4%
2000	7,347		−26.5%
2010	7,678		4.5%
2020	7,963		3.7%
2023 (est.)	8,007		0.6%
Population sources: 1910–2000 1910–1920; 1910 1910–1930; 1940–2000 2000; 2010 2020 * = Lost territory in previous decade.

=== 2010 census ===
The 2010 United States census counted 7,678 people, 2,784 households, and 2,049 families in the township. The population density was 444.2 per square mile (171.5/km^{2}). There were 3,370 housing units at an average density of 195.0 per square mile (75.3/km^{2}). The racial makeup was 80.18% (6,156) White, 9.33% (716) Black or African American, 0.40% (31) Native American, 1.89% (145) Asian, 0.42% (32) Pacific Islander, 3.10% (238) from other races, and 4.69% (360) from two or more races. Hispanic or Latino of any race were 10.43% (801) of the population.

Of the 2,784 households, 41.2% had children under the age of 18; 58.7% were married couples living together; 10.4% had a female householder with no husband present and 26.4% were non-families. Of all households, 21.2% were made up of individuals and 6.6% had someone living alone who was 65 years of age or older. The average household size was 2.76 and the average family size was 3.25.

29.5% of the population were under the age of 18, 12.5% from 18 to 24, 27.8% from 25 to 44, 21.7% from 45 to 64, and 8.4% who were 65 years of age or older. The median age was 29.2 years. For every 100 females, the population had 99.9 males. For every 100 females ages 18 and older there were 99.0 males.

The Census Bureau's 2006–2010 American Community Survey showed that (in 2010 inflation-adjusted dollars) median household income was $72,410 (with a margin of error of +/− $5,321) and the median family income was $78,523 (+/− $10,326). Males had a median income of $55,352 (+/− $9,756) versus $37,052 (+/− $6,255) for females. The per capita income for the borough was $29,529 (+/− $2,650). About 3.3% of families and 7.7% of the population were below the poverty line, including 12.1% of those under age 18 and 9.7% of those age 65 or over.

=== 2000 census ===
As of the 2000 United States census there were 7,347 people, 2,498 households, and 2,020 families residing in the township. The population density was 423.7 inhabitants per square mile (163.6/km^{2}). There were 2,670 housing units at an average density of 154.0 per square mile (59.5/km^{2}). The racial makeup of the township was 80.63% White, 10.96% African American, 0.48% Native American, 2.12% Asian, 0.05% Pacific Islander, 2.18% from other races, and 3.58% from two or more races. Hispanic or Latino of any race were 5.76% of the population.

There were 2,498 households, out of which 52.0% had children under the age of 18 living with them, 67.0% were married couples living together, 9.4% had a female householder with no husband present, and 19.1% were non-families. 15.5% of all households were made up of individuals, and 5.1% had someone living alone who was 65 years of age or older. The average household size was 2.94 and the average family size was 3.29.

In the township the population was spread out, with 33.6% under the age of 18, 10.2% from 18 to 24, 34.9% from 25 to 44, 15.1% from 45 to 64, and 6.2% who were 65 years of age or older. The median age was 29 years. For every 100 females, there were 100.5 males. For every 100 females age 18 and over, there were 98.6 males.

The median income for a household in the township was $39,988, and the median income for a family was $45,553. Males had a median income of $31,698 versus $26,094 for females. The per capita income for the township was $17,580. About 4.4% of families and 5.3% of the population were below the poverty line, including 6.4% of those under age 18 and 4.4% of those age 65 or over.

== Government ==
=== Local government ===
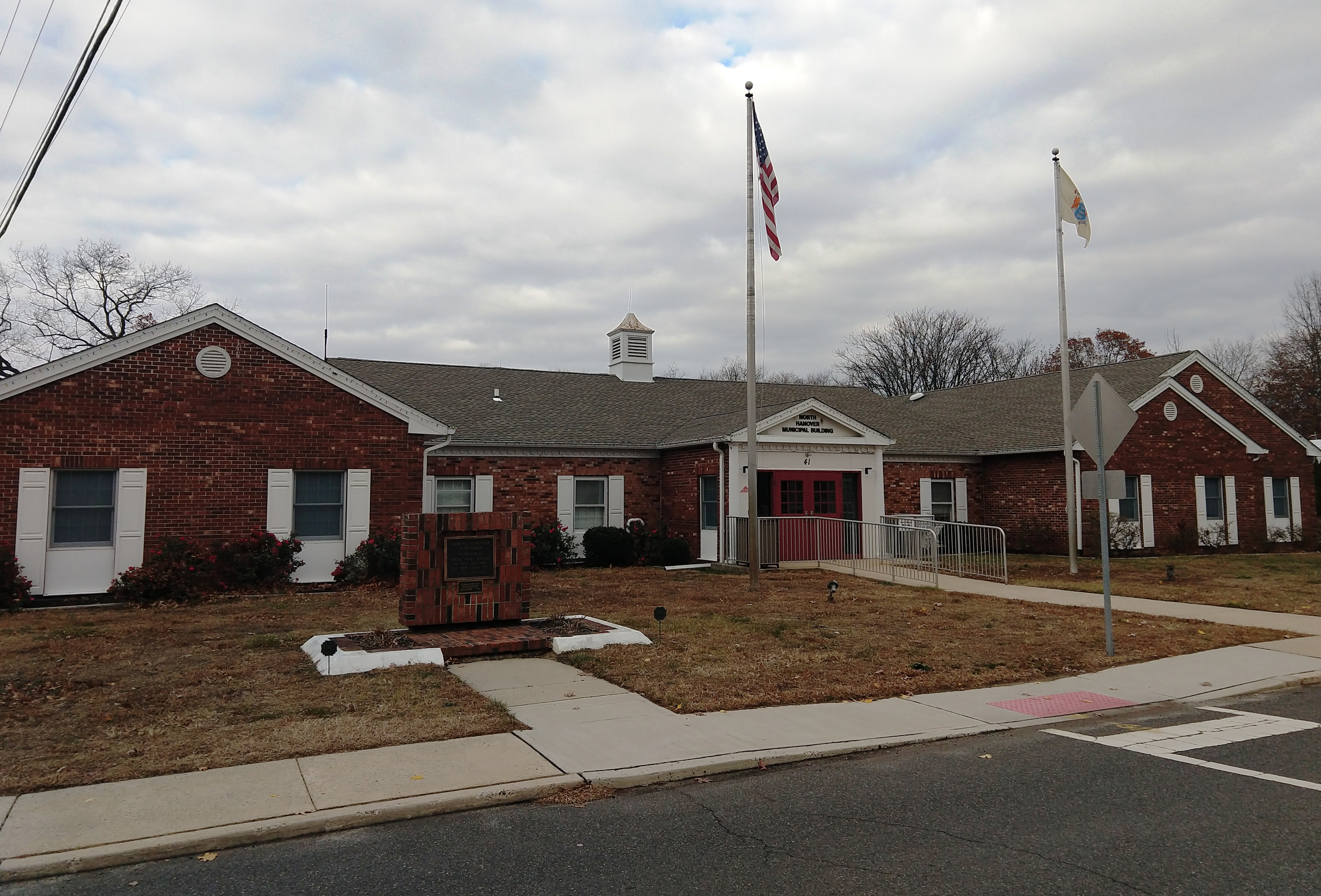
North Hanover Municipal Building

North Hanover Township is governed under the Township form of New Jersey municipal government, one of 141 municipalities (of the 564) statewide that use this form, the second-most commonly used form of government in the state. The Township Committee is comprised of five members, who are elected directly by the voters at-large in partisan elections to serve three-year terms of office on a staggered basis, with either one or two seats coming up for election each year as part of the November general election in a three-year cycle. At an annual reorganization meeting, the Township Committee selects one of its members to serve as Mayor and another as Deputy Mayor.

As of 2023, members of the North Hanover Township Committee are Mayor David L. Forsyth Jr. (R, term on committee and as mayor ends December 31, 2023), Deputy Mayor Brendan J. O'Donnell (D, term on committee ends 2024; term as deputy mayor ends 2023), Ronald DeBaecke Jr. (R, 2025), Christopher A. Doyle (R, 2025), John S. Kocubinski (D, 2024).

=== Federal, state and county representation ===
North Hanover Township is located in the 3rd Congressional District and is part of New Jersey's 12th state legislative district.

For the 119th United States Congress, New Jersey's 3rd congressional district is currently represented Herb Conaway (D, Delran Township). New Jersey is represented in the United States Senate by Democrats Cory Booker (Newark, term ends 2027) and Andy Kim (Moorestown, term ends 2031).

For the 2026–2027 session, the 12th legislative district of the New Jersey Legislature is represented in the State Senate by Owen Henry (R, Old Bridge Township) and in the General Assembly by Robert D. Clifton (R, Matawan) and Alex Sauickie (R, Jackson Township).

Burlington County is governed by a Board of County Commissioners comprised of five members who are chosen at-large in partisan elections to serve three-year terms of office on a staggered basis, with either one or two seats coming up for election each year; at an annual reorganization meeting, the board selects a director and deputy director from among its members to serve a one-year term. As of 2026, Burlington County's Commissioners are: Director Felicia Hopson (D, Willingboro Township, term as commissioner ends December 31, 2027; term as director ends 2026), Deputy Director Allison Eckel (D, Medford, term as commissioner ends 2028; term as deputy director ends 2026), Randy Brolo (D, Lumberton, 2026; elected to an unexpired term), Tyler Burrell (D, Delran Township, 2027) and Tom Pullion (D, Edgewater Park, 2026).

Burlington County's constitutional officers are Clerk Joanne Schwartz (D, Southampton Township, 2028), Sheriff James H. Kostoplis (D, Bordentown, 2028) and Surrogate Brian J. Carlin (D, Burlington Township, 2026).

=== Politics ===
United States presidential election results for North Hanover Township 2024 2020 2016 2012 2008 2004
Year	Republican		Democratic		Third party(ies)	
Year	No.	%	No.	%	No.	%
2024	1,738	63.57%	955	34.93%	41	1.50%
2020	1,713	58.40%	1,155	39.38%	65	2.22%
2016	1,484	61.27%	816	33.69%	122	5.04%
2012	1,211	55.78%	934	43.02%	26	1.20%
2008	1,336	56.30%	1,005	42.35%	32	1.35%
2004	1,421	59.98%	922	38.92%	26	1.10%

As of March 2011, there were a total of 3,280 registered voters in North Hanover Township, of which 703 (21.4% vs. 33.3% countywide) were registered as Democrats, 907 (27.7% vs. 23.9%) were registered as Republicans and 1,668 (50.9% vs. 42.8%) were registered as Unaffiliated. There were 2 voters registered as either Libertarians or Greens. Among the township's 2010 Census population, 42.7% (vs. 61.7% in Burlington County) were registered to vote, including 60.6% of those ages 18 and over (vs. 80.3% countywide).

In the 2012 presidential election, Republican Mitt Romney received 1,211 votes here (55.2% vs. 40.2% countywide), ahead of Democrat Barack Obama with 934 votes (42.6% vs. 58.1%) and other candidates with 26 votes (1.2% vs. 1.0%), among the 2,192 ballots cast by the township's 3,469 registered voters, for a turnout of 63.2% (vs. 74.5% in Burlington County). In the 2008 presidential election, Republican John McCain received 1,336 votes here (55.9% vs. 39.9% countywide), ahead of Democrat Barack Obama with 1,005 votes (42.1% vs. 58.4%) and other candidates with 32 votes (1.3% vs. 1.0%), among the 2,390 ballots cast by the township's 3,413 registered voters, for a turnout of 70.0% (vs. 80.0% in Burlington County). In the 2004 presidential election, Republican George W. Bush received 1,421 votes here (59.6% vs. 46.0% countywide), ahead of Democrat John Kerry with 922 votes (38.7% vs. 52.9%) and other candidates with 26 votes (1.1% vs. 0.8%), among the 2,383 ballots cast by the township's 3,240 registered voters, for a turnout of 73.5% (vs. 78.8% in the whole county).

Gubernatorial election results for North Hanover Township
Year	Republican		Democratic		Third party(ies)	
Year	No.	%	No.	%	No.	%
2025	1,242	60.00%	816	39.42%	12	0.58%
2021	1,160	67.29%	551	31.96%	13	0.75%
2017	835	63.26%	456	34.55%	29	2.20%
2013	1,040	74.45%	338	24.19%	19	1.36%
2009	995	64.65%	442	28.72%	102	6.63%
2005	880	59.10%	520	34.92%	89	5.98%

In the 2013 gubernatorial election, Republican Chris Christie received 1,040 votes here (72.9% vs. 61.4% countywide), ahead of Democrat Barbara Buono with 338 votes (23.7% vs. 35.8%) and other candidates with 19 votes (1.3% vs. 1.2%), among the 1,426 ballots cast by the township's 3,268 registered voters, yielding a 43.6% turnout (vs. 44.5% in the county). In the 2009 gubernatorial election, Republican Chris Christie received 995 votes here (63.8% vs. 47.7% countywide), ahead of Democrat Jon Corzine with 442 votes (28.4% vs. 44.5%), Independent Chris Daggett with 69 votes (4.4% vs. 4.8%) and other candidates with 33 votes (2.1% vs. 1.2%), among the 1,559 ballots cast by the township's 3,339 registered voters, yielding a 46.7% turnout (vs. 44.9% in the county).

United States Senate election results for North Hanover Township1
Year	Republican		Democratic		Third party(ies)	
Year	No.	%	No.	%	No.	%
2024	1,518	58.03%	1,048	40.06%	50	1.91%
2018	1,185	62.50%	631	33.28%	80	4.22%
2012	1,144	55.51%	901	43.72%	16	0.78%
2006	778	59.12%	488	37.08%	50	3.80%

United States Senate election results for North Hanover Township2
Year	Republican		Democratic		Third party(ies)	
Year	No.	%	No.	%	No.	%
2020	1,660	58.47%	1,115	39.27%	64	2.25%
2014	758	62.18%	434	35.60%	27	2.21%
2013	524	63.59%	281	34.10%	19	2.31%
2008	1,221	56.35%	903	41.67%	43	1.98%

== Education ==
Children in public school for pre-kindergarten through sixth grade attend the North Hanover Township School District. The district is the singular district for most of the township, except for portions on Joint Base McGuire-Dix-Lakehurst; the school district is one of three choices for K-12 students on the property of the base.

The North Hanover district operates three elementary schools, with two located in Jacobstown and one on the grounds of Joint Base MDL. As of the 2020–21 school year, the district, comprised of three schools, had an enrollment of 1,127 students and 124.1 classroom teachers (on an FTE basis), for a student–teacher ratio of 9.1:1. Schools in the district (with 2020–21 school enrollment data from the National Center for Education Statistics) are Endeavour Elementary School with 607 students in grades PreK-4 (on Joint Base MDL), Clarence B. Lamb Elementary School with 291 students in grades PreK-4 (in Jacobstown) and North Hanover Township Upper Elementary School with 227 students in grades 5-6 (in Jacobstown).

Public school students in seventh through twelfth grades attend the schools of the Northern Burlington County Regional School District, which also serves students from Chesterfield Township, Mansfield Township and Springfield Township, along with children of military personnel based at Joint Base McGuire–Dix–Lakehurst. The schools in the district (with 2020–21 enrollment data from the National Center for Education Statistics) are Northern Burlington County Regional Middle School with 743 students in grades 7 - 8 and Northern Burlington County Regional High School with 1,403 students in grades 9-12. Both schools are in the Columbus section of Mansfield Township. Using a formula that reflects the population and the value of the assessed property in each of the constituent municipalities, under which taxpayers in North Hanover Township pay 14.2% of the district's tax levy, with the district's 2013–2014 budget including $35.6 million in spending. The 7–12 district's board of education has nine members, who are elected directly by voters to serve three-year terms of office on a staggered basis, with three seats up for election each year. The nine seats on the Board of Education are allocated based on the population of the constituent municipalities, with three seats assigned to North Hanover Township.

Students from New Hanover Township, and from all of Burlington County, are eligible to attend the Burlington County Institute of Technology, a countywide public school district that serves the vocational and technical education needs of students at the high school and post-secondary level at its campuses in Medford and Westampton. All costs associated with attending the school are paid by the home school district, which is also responsible for student transportation to and from the school.

== Transportation ==
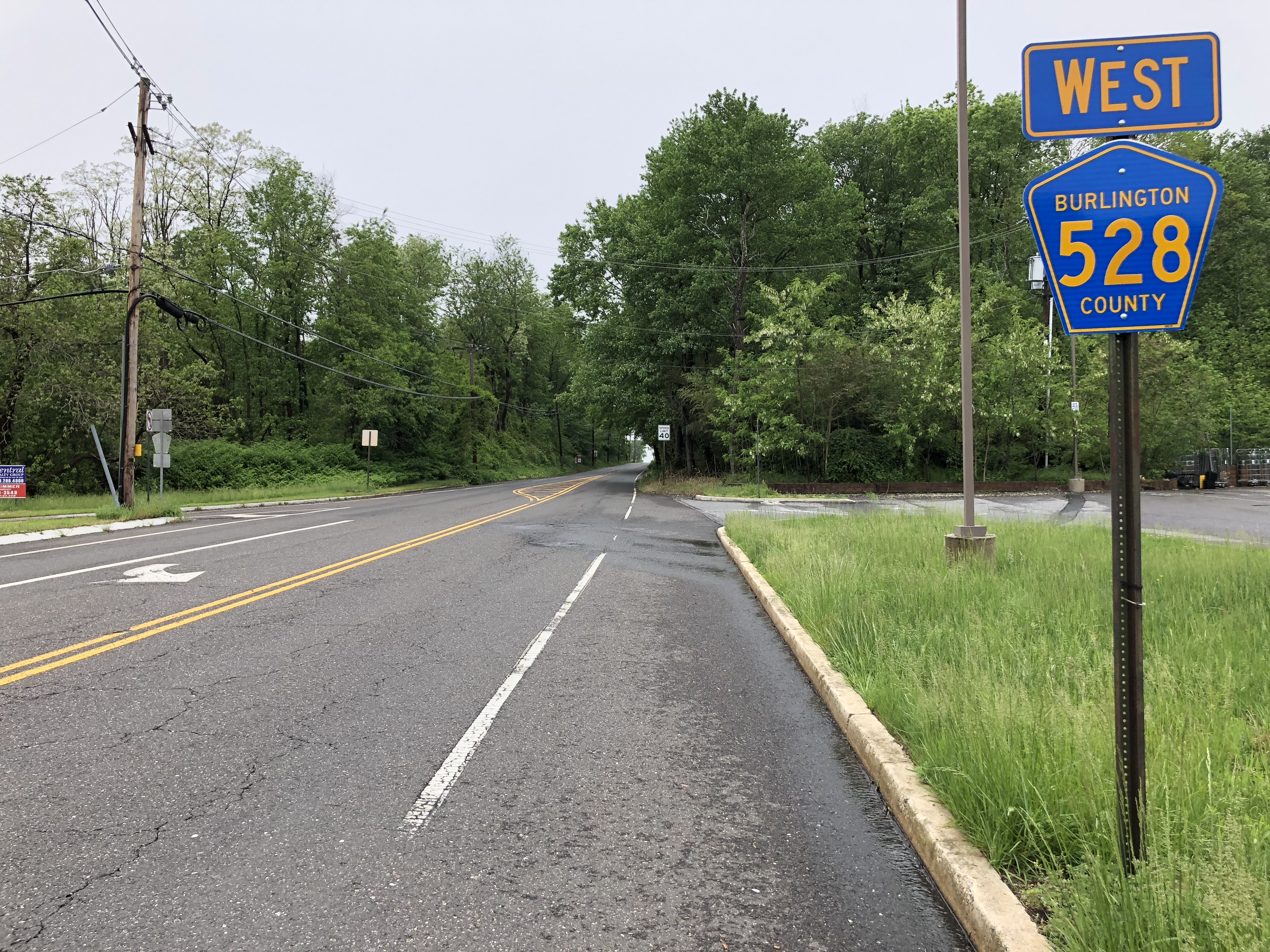
County Road 528 in North Hanover Township

=== Roads and highways ===
As of May 2010, the township had a total of 42.75 miles (68.80 km) of roadways, of which 22.34 miles (35.95 km) were maintained by the municipality and 20.41 miles (32.85 km) by Burlington County.

No Interstate, U.S., or State route pass through. County Road 528 and County Road 537. are the two main county routes that traverse the township.

Limited access roads that are accessible in neighboring communities include Interstate 295 (Hamilton Township), and Interstate 195 (Hamilton & Upper Freehold Township). While the New Jersey Turnpike is also in bordering Hamilton Township, the closest interchange is exit 7 in Bordentown Township.

=== Public transportation ===
NJ Transit provides bus service in the township on the 317 route between Asbury Park and Philadelphia.

== Notable people ==
People who were born in, residents of, or otherwise closely associated with North Hanover Township include:

- Joe Borden (1854–1929), professional baseball player, 1875–1876
- George Sykes (1802–1880), represented New Jersey's 2nd congressional district in the United States House of Representatives from 1843 to 1845, and was reelected in 1845 to fill a vacancy, serving until 1847
