= Northern Burlington County Regional School District =

School district in Burlington County, New Jersey, US

Address
- 160 Mansfield Road East Columbus, Burlington County, New Jersey, 08022; United States
- Coordinates: 40.08705°N 74.688366°W

District information
- Grades: 7-12
- Established: 1956
- Superintendent: Andrew Zuckerman
- Business administrator: Richard Kaz Jr.
- Schools: 2

Students and staff
- Enrollment: 2,163 (as of 2020–21)
- Faculty: 168.4 FTEs
- Student–teacher ratio: 12.8:1

Other information
- District Factor Group: DE
- Website: www.nburlington.com
Ind.	Per pupil	District spending	Rank (*)	7-12 average	%± vs. average
1A	Total Spending	$18,798	10	$18,891	−0.5%
1	Budgetary Cost	13,637	8	14,586	−6.5%
2	Classroom Instruction	7,345	6	8,339	−11.9%
6	Support Services	2,388	26	2,114	13.0%
8	Administrative Cost	1,361	7	1,561	−12.8%
10	Operations & Maintenance	1,957	22	1,798	8.8%
13	Extracurricular Activities	557	6	673	−17.2%
16	Median Teacher Salary	58,914	5	65,769
Data from NJDoE 2014 Taxpayers' Guide to Education Spending. *Of 7-12 districts with any number of students. Lowest spending=1; Highest=47

The Northern Burlington County Regional School District is a comprehensive regional school district serves students in seventh through twelfth grades from four communities in Burlington County, in the U.S. state of New Jersey. Students are served from Chesterfield Township, Mansfield Township, North Hanover Township and Springfield Township, along with children of military personnel based at Joint Base McGuire–Dix–Lakehurst.

As of the 2020–21 school year, the district, comprised of two schools, had an enrollment of 2,163 students and 168.4 classroom teachers (on an FTE basis), for a student–teacher ratio of 12.8:1.

Using a formula that reflects the population and the value of the assessed property in each of the constituent municipalities, taxpayers in Mansfield Township pay 46.5% of the district's tax levy, while the remainder is apportioned to residents Chesterfield Township (21.6%), Springfield Township (17.7%) and North Hanover Township (14.2%). The district's 2013-14 budget included $35.6 million in spending.

The district is classified by the New Jersey Department of Education as being in District Factor Group "DE", the fifth-highest of eight groupings. District Factor Groups organize districts statewide to allow comparison by common socioeconomic characteristics of the local districts. From lowest socioeconomic status to highest, the categories are A, B, CD, DE, FG, GH, I and J.

== History ==
The district was established after the four constituent districts approved a referendum in March 1956. A November 1958 ballot question asked for approval of funds to buy a 40-acre (16 ha) plot of land and fund the construction of a school building. With much of the area being rural, plans were made to have the school focus on vocational agriculture, including getting input from a Rutgers University expert on developing the agricultural component of the syllabus.

Constructed with 29 classrooms at a cost of $1.25 million (equivalent to $13.6 million in 2025), the new school opened in September 1960 with 750 students, including 150 children of those stationed at McGuire Air Force Base.

== Attendance area ==
It is the singular secondary school district for most of North Hanover Township, except portions on Joint Base McGuire-Dix-Lakehurst, which is listed by the U.S. Census Bureau as having its own school district. Students on portions of the joint base attend area school district public schools, as the Department of Defense Education Activity (DoDEA) does not operate any schools on that base. Students on-post in the McGuire and Dix areas (McGuire Air Force Base and Fort Dix) may attend one of the following in their grade levels, with all siblings in a family taking the same choice: Northern Burlington County Regional (secondary district), North Hanover Township District (elementary district), and Pemberton Township School District (K-12).

== Schools ==
The schools in the district (with 2018–19 enrollment data from the National Center for Education Statistics) are:

- Northern Burlington County Regional Middle School with 743 students in grades 7 - 8
  - Andrew Kearns, principal
- Northern Burlington County Regional High School with 1,403 students in grades 9-12
  - Kaitlin McCann, principal

Both schools are located in the Columbus section of Mansfield Township.

== Administration ==
Core members of the district's administration are:

- Andrew Zuckerman, superintendent of schools
- Richard Kaz Jr., school business administrator and board secretary

== Board of education ==
The district's board of education is comprised of nine members who set policy and oversee the fiscal and educational operation of the district through its administration. As a Type II school district, the board's trustees are elected directly by voters to serve three-year terms of office on a staggered basis, with three seats up for election each year held (since 2012) as part of the November general election. The board appoints a superintendent to oversee the district's day-to-day operations and a business administrator to supervise the business functions of the district. The nine seats on the board of education are allocated based on the population of the constituent municipalities, with three seats assigned to both Mansfield Township and North Hanover Township, two seats to Chesterfield Township and one seat to Springfield Township.
