= Fort Dix =

USASA, Fort Dix
- Part of Joint Base McGuire-Dix-Lakehurst
- Located near: Trenton, New Jersey
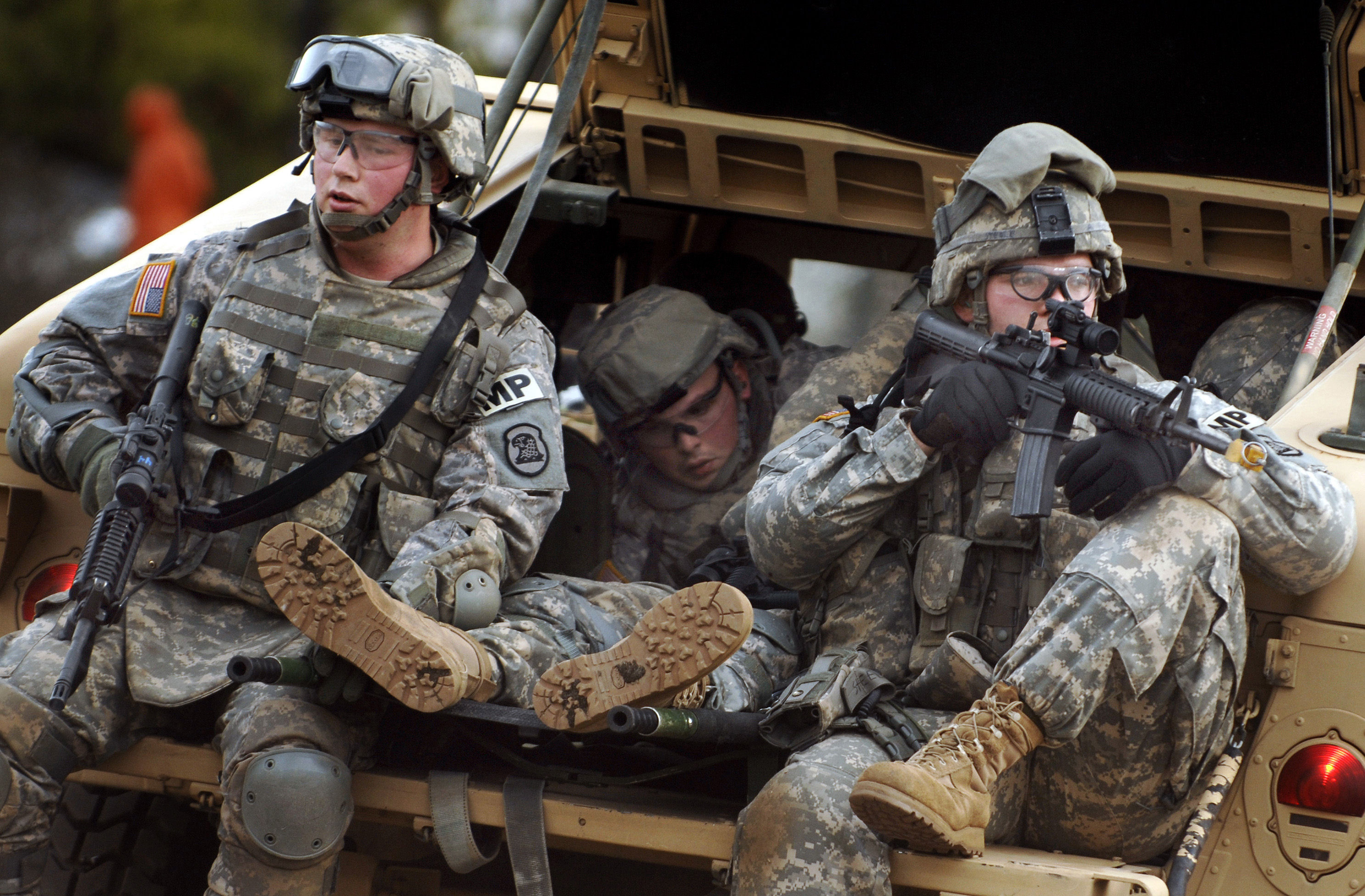
- U.S. Army combat training at Fort Dix in January 2008

Site information
- Type: Army
- Controlled by: United States

Location
- Coordinates: 40°01′09″N 74°31′22″W

Site history
- Built: 1917; 109 years ago
- In use: 1917–present

Garrison information
- Current commander: COL Clay M. Huffman
- Garrison: 99th Readiness Division

Army Support Activity Fort Dix
- Census-designated place
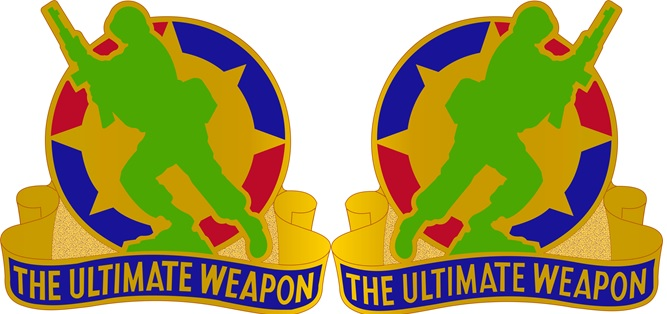
- Seal
- Nickname: Fort Dix
- Motto: “The Ultimate Weapon”
- Fort Dix's location in Burlington County, New Jersey. Inset: Location of Burlington County in New Jersey Army Support Activity Fort Dix (New Jersey) Army Support Activity Fort Dix (the United States)
- Coordinates: 40.006°N 74.611°W
- Country: United States
- State: New Jersey
- County: Burlington
- Township: New Hanover; Pemberton; Springfield

Area
  - Total: 10.34 sq mi (26.78 km^{2})
  - Land: 10.21 sq mi (26.45 km^{2})
  - Water: 0.13 sq mi (0.33 km^{2}) 1.22%
- Elevation: 141 ft (43 m)

Population (2020)
  - Total: 6,508
  - Density: 637.2/sq mi (246.02/km^{2})
- Time zone: UTC−05:00 (Eastern (EST))
  - Summer (DST): UTC−04:00 (Eastern (EDT))
- ZIP Code: 08640
- Area codes: 609, 640
- FIPS code: 34-24300
- GNIS feature ID: 02389104
- Website: home.army.mil/dix/

Fort Dix, the common name for the Army Support Activity (ASA) located at Joint Base McGuire–Dix–Lakehurst, is a United States Army installation. It is located 16.1 miles (25.9 km) south-southeast of Trenton, New Jersey.

The installation is home to the headquarters of the 99th Readiness Division, New Jersey National Guard Joint Force, 174th Infantry Brigade and the ASA, among others. As of the 2020 U.S. census, Fort Dix census-designated place (CDP) had a total population of 7,716, of which 5,951 were in New Hanover Township, 1,765 were in Pemberton Township, and none were in Springfield Township (though portions of the CDP are included there).

Established in 1917, Fort Dix was combined with adjoining U.S. Air Force and Navy facilities to become Joint Base McGuire-Dix-Lakehurst (JB MDL) in 2009. Fort Dix would transition to U.S. Army Support Activity Fort Dix (USASA, Fort Dix) after the Joint Base was formed. However, it remains commonly known as "Fort Dix", "ASA Dix", "ASA Fort Dix", or "Dix".

The Current Garrison Commander of U.S. Army Support Activity Fort Dix is Colonel Clay M. Huffman, who also serves as Deputy Commander of Joint Base McGuire-Dix-Lakehurst (JB MDL) since July 2026.

== Overview ==
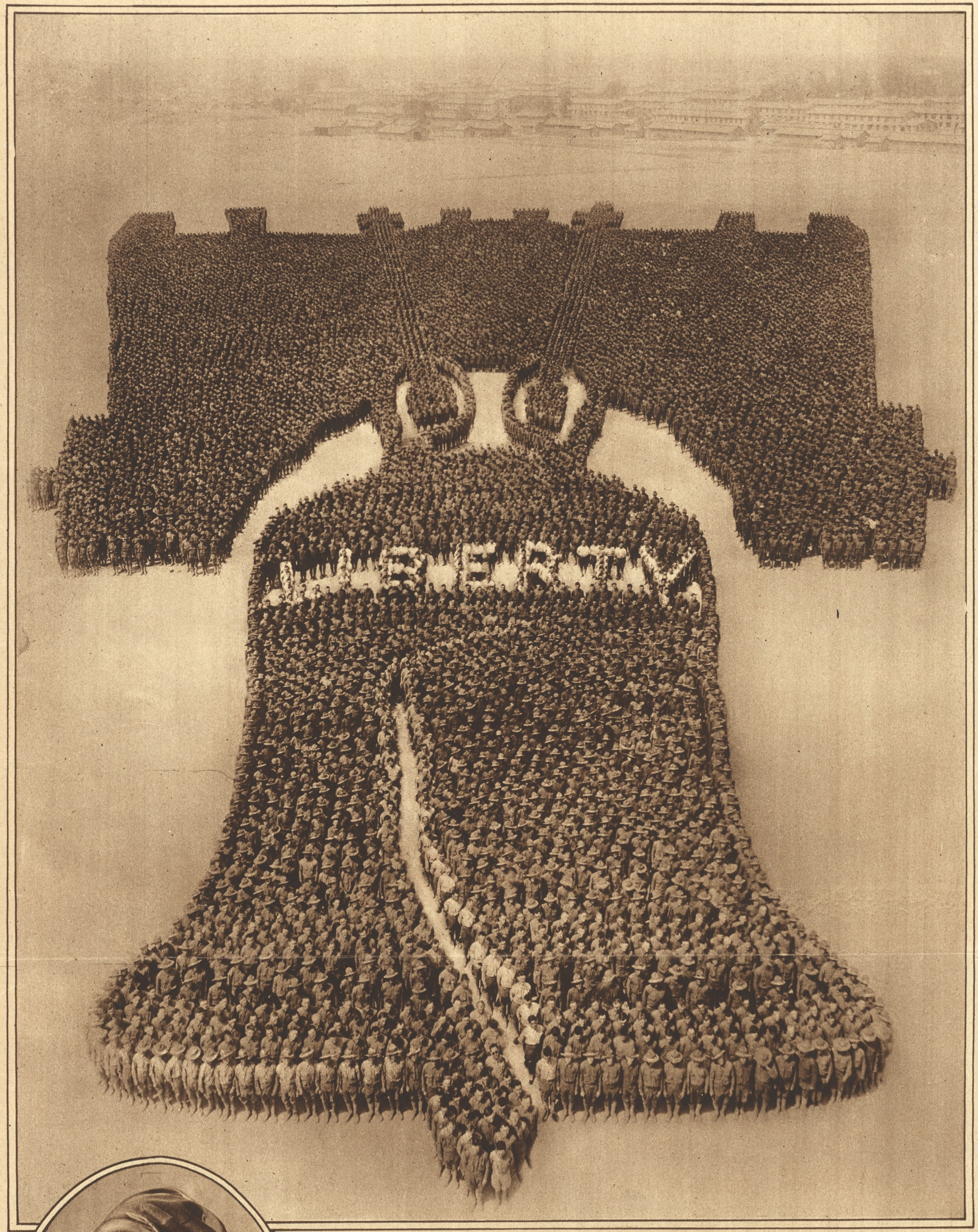
The Human Liberty Bell at Camp Dix, including 25,000 people in 1918

Fort Dix was established on 16 July 1917, as Camp Dix, named in honor of Major General John Adams Dix, a veteran of the War of 1812 and the American Civil War, and a former U.S. Senator, U.S. Secretary of the Treasury, and Governor of New York. Camp Dix was home to the 153rd Depot Brigade. The role of World War I depot brigades was to receive recruits and draftees, then organize them and provide them with uniforms, equipment, and initial military training. Depot brigades also received soldiers returning home at the end of the war and carried out their mustering out and discharges. During World War I, many of the soldiers serving in the U.S. 78th Infantry Division, nicknamed the "Lightning Division," trained at Camp Dix. The inspiration for the nickname came from the famous applejack whiskey (“white lightning”) produced in central New Jersey and the suggestion that the unit was ready and willing to strike like lightning at a moment's notice.

In 1978, the first female recruits entered basic training at Fort Dix. In 1991, Dix trained Kuwaiti civilians in basic military skills so they could take part in their country's liberation.

Camp Dix in 1917

Fort Dix ended its active U.S. Army training mission in 1991 due to Base Realignment and Closure Commission recommendations, which ended its command by a major general. The post has since been under the control of the United States Army Reserve.

In 2009, Fort Dix and the adjacent Air Force and Naval facilities were consolidated into a single secure facility, called Joint Base McGuire-Dix-Lakehurst. The supporting component is the U.S. Air Force, and base operations are executed by the 87th Air Base Wing, which provides installation management to all of the joint base while both the Navy and Army retain command and control of their missions, personnel, equipment, and component-specific services. Neither the Navy nor the Army post is subordinate to the Joint Base; each is simply supported by the joint base in base operations such as utilities, childcare centers, gyms, and other services, but each one reports through its own service-specific command chain and has its own commander (the Navy a captain and the Army a colonel). The commanders of both Fort Dix and Lakehurst serve also as deputy joint base commanders.

ASA Fort Dix remains a key Mobilization Force Generation Installation (MFGI) along the east coast. Due to its attachment to the McGuire Air Force Base, units can be rapidly trained on ranges and mobilized with C-17 Globemaster IIIs provided by the Air Force units at JB MDL.

== Units assigned ==
- 1st Brigade, Atlantic Training Division, 84th Training Command
- 99th Readiness Division
- 174th Infantry Brigade
- 305th Aerial Port Squadron
- Fleet Logistics Squadron (VR-64)
- Marine Aircraft Group 49
- Military Entrance Processing Station
- Navy Operational Support Center
- NCO Academy
- United States Air Force Expeditionary Center
- USCG Atlantic Strike Team

== History ==
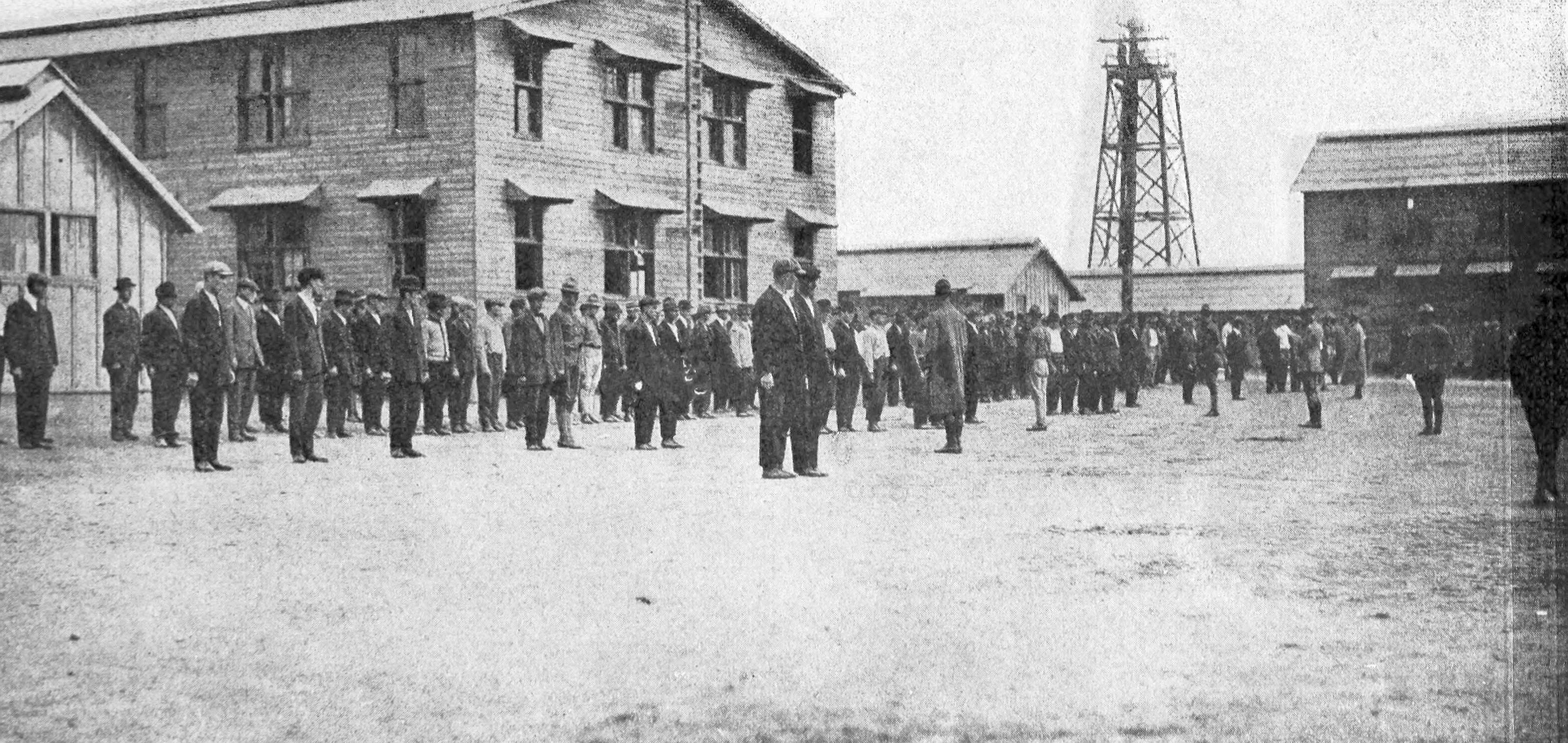
First day at Camp Dix for World War I recruits

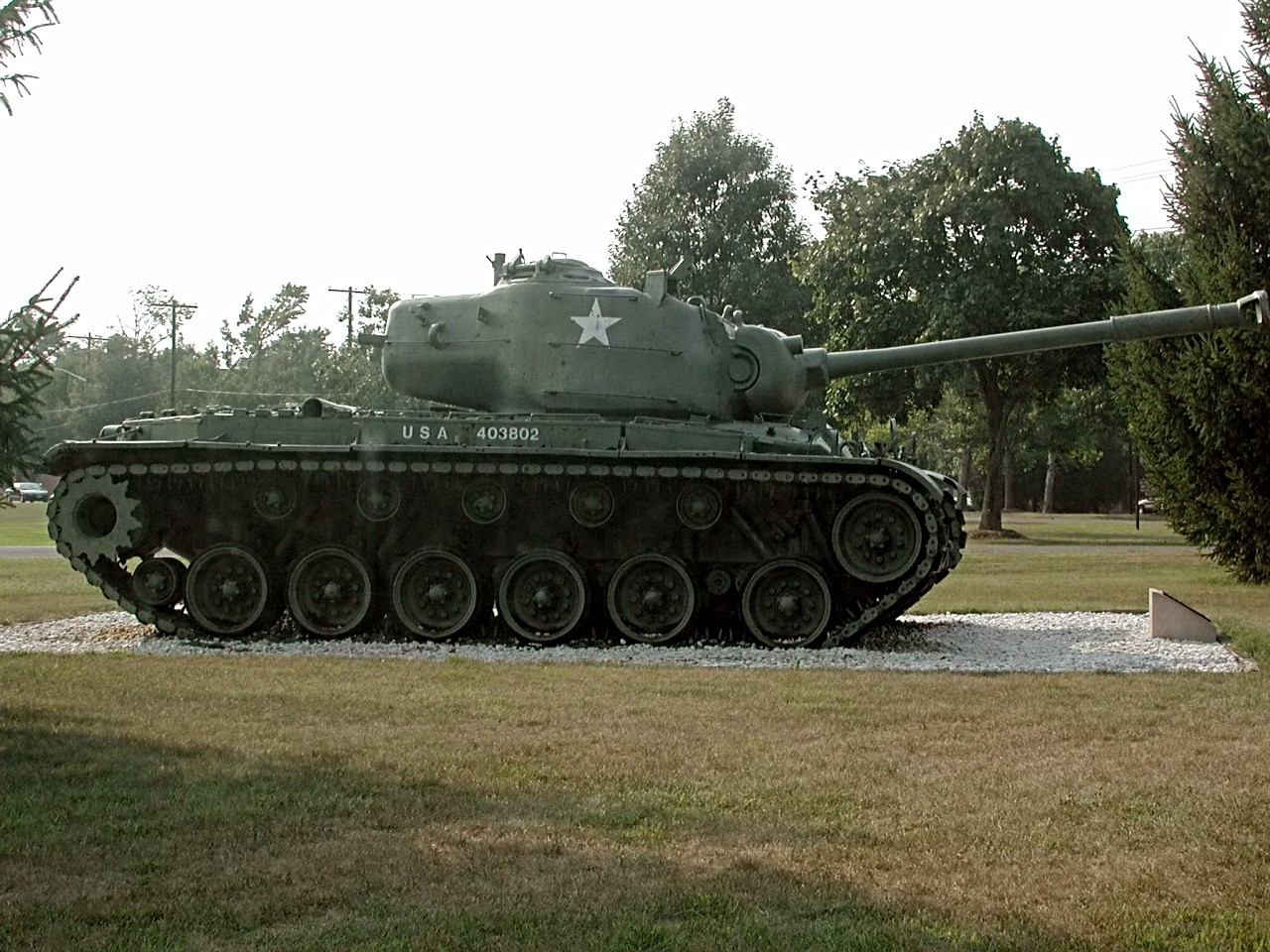
An M26 Pershing tank from the World War II era on display at Fort Dix

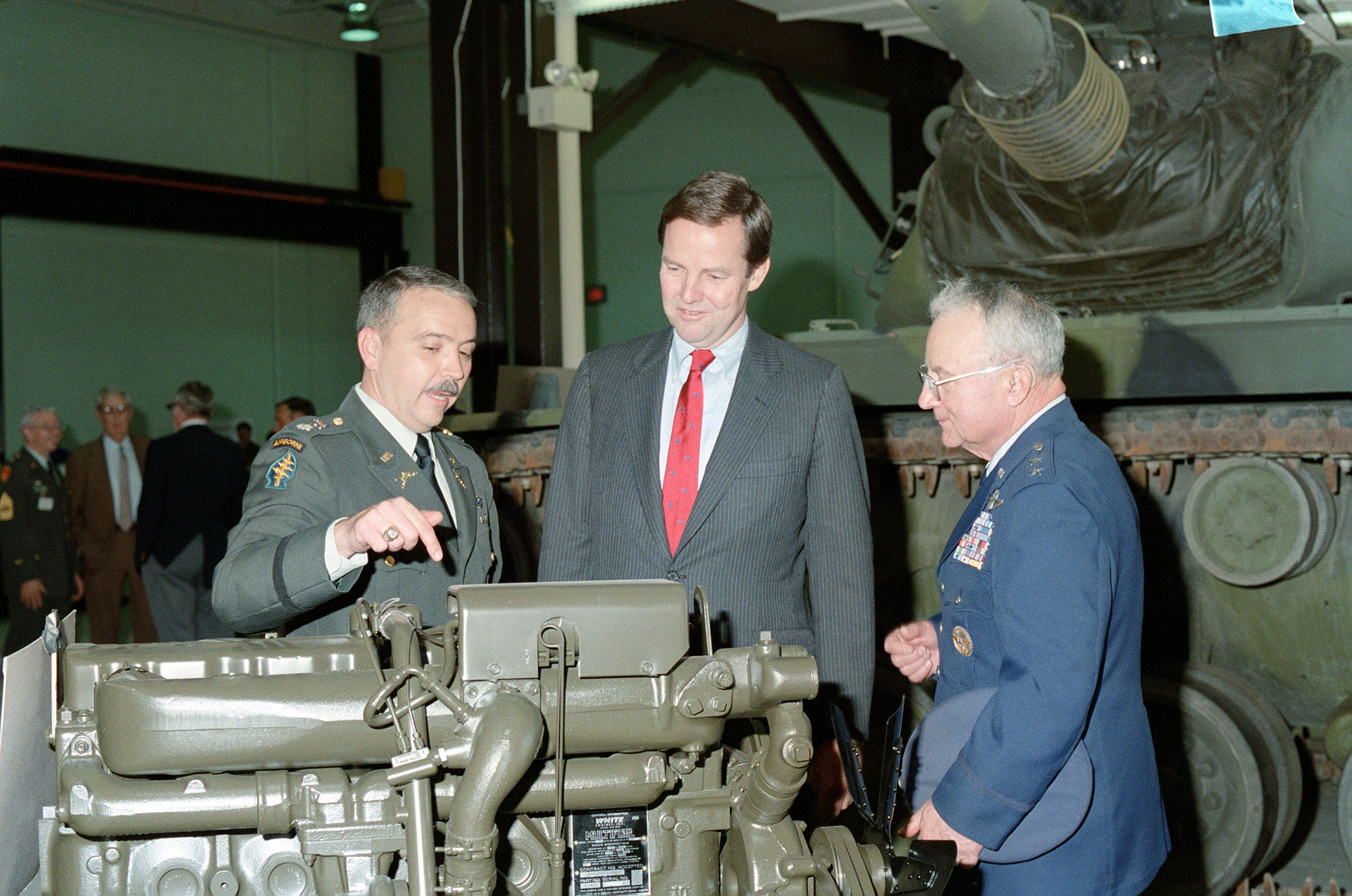
New Jersey governor Thomas Kean visits Fort Dix in November 1987

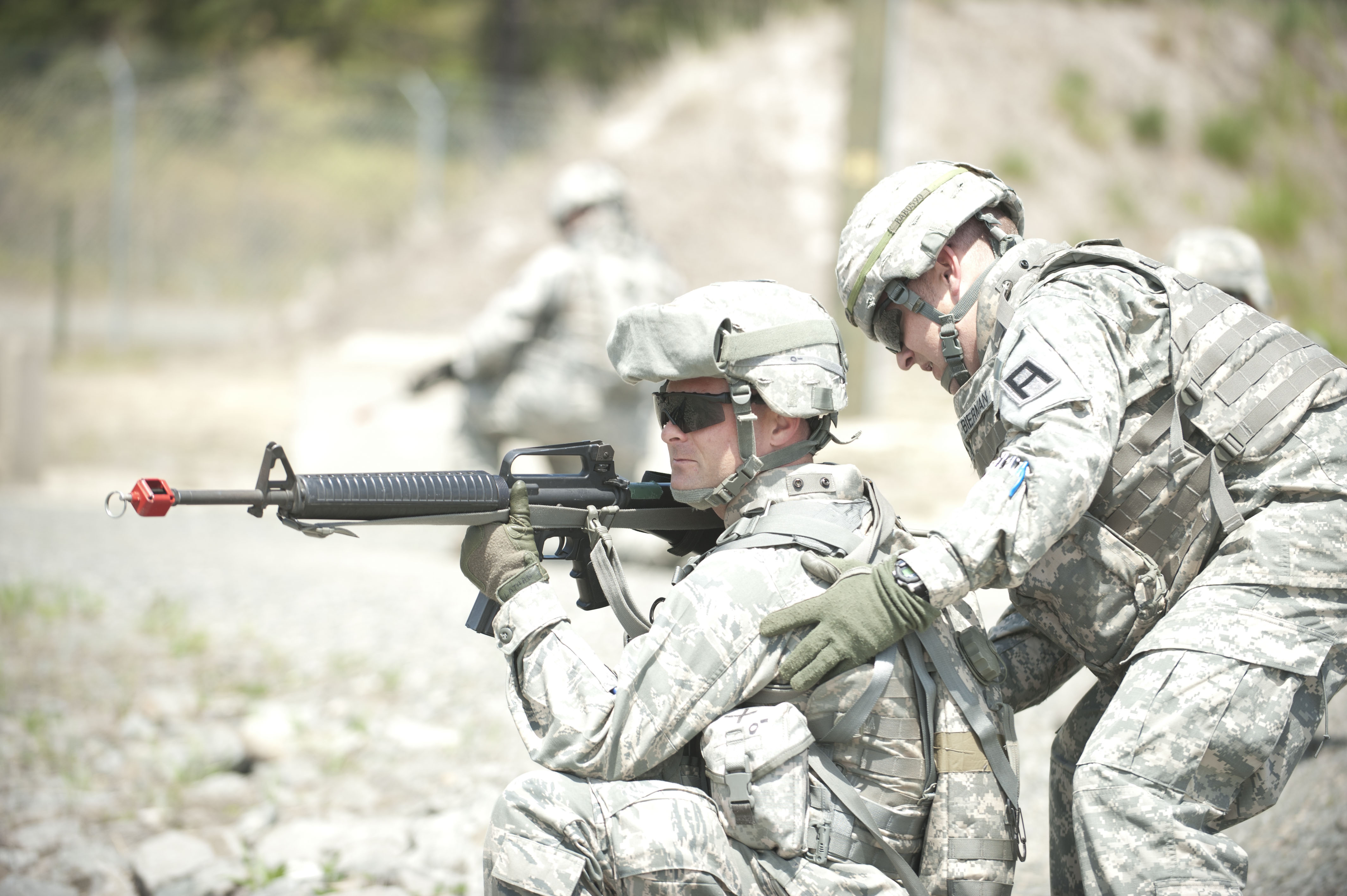
U.S. Army drills at Fort Dix in May 2011

See footnote

Construction began in June 1917. Camp Dix, as it was known at the time, was a training and staging ground for units during World War I. Though the camp was an embarkation camp for the New York Port of Embarkation, it did not fall under the direct control of that command, with the War Department retaining direct jurisdiction. The camp became a demobilization center after the war. Between the World Wars, Camp Dix was a reception, training, and discharge center for the Civilian Conservation Corps. Camp Dix became Fort Dix on 8 March 1939, and the installation became a permanent Army post. During and after World War II, the fort served the same purpose as in the First World War, serving as a training and staging ground during the war and a demobilization center after the war.

After victory in Europe, arrangements were made to return prisoners of war to their home countries. 154 Soviet citizens who had been captured in German uniform were brought from Camp Ruston in Louisiana to Fort Dix in preparation for their return. On 29 June 1945, having learned of the plan, they rioted, attempting to provoke their guards to shoot them. Three hanged themselves. Seven proved they were not Soviet citizens, and the rest were shipped out on 31 August.

On 15 July 1947, Fort Dix became a basic-training center and the home of the 9th Infantry Division. In 1954, the 9th moved out and the 69th Infantry Division made the fort home until it was deactivated on 16 March 1956. During the Vietnam War, rapid expansion took place. A mock Vietnamese village was constructed, and soldiers received Vietnam-specific training before being deployed. Since Vietnam, Fort Dix has sent soldiers to Operation Desert Shield, Desert Storm, Bosnia, Afghanistan, and Iraq.

=== U.S. Coast Guard site ===
The Atlantic Strike Team (AST) of the U.S. Coast Guard is based at Fort Dix. As part of the Department of Homeland Security, the AST is responsible for responding to oil-pollution and hazardous-materials release incidents to protect public health and the environment.

=== Federal Correctional Institution ===
ASA Fort Dix is also home to Federal Correctional Institution, Fort Dix (FCI Fort Dix), the largest single federal prison. It is a low-security installation for male inmates located within the military installation. As of 19 November 2009, it housed 4,310 inmates, and a minimum-security satellite camp housed an additional 426.

== Mission realignment ==
Knowing that Fort Dix was on a base closure list, the U.S. Air Force (USAF) attempted to save the U.S. Army post during 1987. The USAF moved the Security Police (SP) Air Base Ground Defense school from Camp Bullis, Texas, to Dix in fall 1987. Putting 50–100 SP trainees on a commercial flight from San Antonio, Texas, to Philadelphia, Pennsylvania, every few weeks was eventually realized to be not cost effective, so the school was later moved back to Camp Bullis.

Fort Dix was an early casualty of the first base realignment and closure process in the early 1990s, after having lost its traditional basic-training mission, but advocates attracted Army Reserve interest in keeping the post as a training reservation. With the reserve, and millions of dollars for improvements, Fort Dix has grown again to employ 3,000. As many as 15,000 troops train there on weekends, and the post has been a major mobilization point for reserve and National Guard troops since the September 11 attacks on New York City and Washington, D.C.

The installation provides power projection for U.S. Army Western Hemisphere Command and is under the command and control of U.S. Army Installation Management Command. The 99th Readiness Division also has increasing control over the installation due to new U.S. Army wide initiatives introduced in 2025.

Current primary missions include training and providing regional base operations support to on-post and off-post active component and U.S. Army Reserve units, soldiers, families, and retirees. Fort Dix supported more than 1.1 million man-days of training in 1998. More than 13,500 persons, on average, live or work within the garrison and its tenant organizations. Devens Reserve Force Training Area in Massachusetts is a sub-installation of the ASA.

=== 2005 realignments ===
In 2005, the US Department of Defense announced that Fort Dix would be affected by a base realignment and closure. For base operations support, it became part of Joint Base McGuire-Dix-Lakehurst, N.J. It was the first base of its kind in the United States and is the Department of Defense's only three-service joint base. ASA Fort Dix occupies and supports all training across 31,000 of the joint base's 42,000 acres.

== Attack plots ==
=== 1970 ===
In 1970, the Weather Underground planned to detonate a nail bomb at a noncommissioned officers' dance at the base to "bring the war home" and "give the United States and the rest of the world a sense that this country was going to be completely unlivable if the United States continued in Vietnam." The plot failed the morning of the dance, when a bomb under construction exploded at the group's Greenwich Village, New York City, townhouse, killing three members of the group.

=== 2007 ===
On 8 May 2007, six individuals, mostly ethnic Albanian Muslims, were arrested for plotting an attack against Fort Dix and the soldiers within. The men are believed to be Islamic radicals who may have been inspired by the ideologies of al-Qaeda. The men allegedly planned to storm the base with automatic weapons in an attempt to kill as many soldiers as possible. The men faced charges of conspiracy to kill U.S. soldiers.

== 1969 stockade riot ==
On 5 June 1969, 250 men imprisoned in the military stockade rioted. The prisoners called it a rebellion and cited grievances including "unsanitary conditions", overcrowding, starvation, beatings, being chained to chairs, forced confessions and participation in an unjust war. The Army initially called it a "disturbance" caused by a small number of "instigators" and "troublemakers", but soon charged 38 soldiers with riot and inciting to riot. The antiwar movement, which had been increasingly recognizing and supporting resistance to the war within the military, quickly moved to defend the rebels/rioters and those the Army singled out for punishment. Soon the slogan "Free the Fort Dix 38" was heard in antiwar speeches, written about in underground newspapers and leaflets, and demonstrations were planned.

Due to public backlash against the military's treatment of the prisoners, only five of the original 38 were brought before a general court-martial on serious charges. Most had their charges dropped entirely, while nine faced a special court-martial, the military equivalent of misdemeanor court. Four of those were convicted of misdemeanor participation in a riot and the other five acquitted. Of the five singled out for general courts-martial, one was acquitted completely while four were discharged with varying sentences including hard labor.

== Ultimate Weapon monument ==
In 1957, during their leisure hours, Specialist 4 Steven Goodman, assisted by PFC Stuart Scherr, made a small clay model of a charging infantryman. Their tabletop model was spotted by a public-relations officer, who brought it to the attention of Deputy Post Commander Bruce Clarke, who suggested the construction of a larger statue to serve as a symbol of Fort Dix. Goodman and Scherr, who had studied industrial arts together in New York City and were classified by the Army as illustrators, undertook the project under the management of Sergeant Major Bill Wright. Operating on a limited budget, and using old railroad track, Bondo, and other available items, they created a 12-foot figure of a charging infantryman in full battle dress, representing no particular race or ethnicity.

By 1988, years of weather had taken a toll on the statue, and a restoration campaign raised over $100,000. Under the auspices of Goodman and the Fort Dix chapter of the Association of the United States Army, the statue was recast in bronze and its concrete base was replaced by black granite.

The statue stands 25 feet tall at the entrance to Infantry Park. Its inscription reads

This monument is dedicated to
the only indispensable instrument of war,
The American Soldier—

The Ultimate Weapon

"If they are not there,
you don't own it."
17 August 1990

== Geography ==
According to the U.S. Census Bureau, Fort Dix had a total area of 10.389 square miles (26.909 km^{2}), of which 0.127 square mile (0.329 km^{2}) is covered by water (1.22%).

=== Climate ===
The climate in this area is characterized by hot, humid summers and generally mild to cool winters. According to the Köppen climate classification, Fort Dix has a humid subtropical climate, Cfa on climate maps.

== Demographics ==
Historical population
Census	Pop.	Note	%±
1970	26,290		—
1980	14,297		−45.6%
1990	10,205		−28.6%
2000	7,464		−26.9%
2010	7,716		3.4%
2020	6,508		−15.7%
Population sources: 1950 1960 1970; 1980 1990 2000; 2010 2010 2020

Fort Dix was listed as an unincorporated community in the 1970 U.S. census; and then as a census designated place in the 1980 United States census.

=== 2020 census ===
Fort Dix CDP, New Jersey – Racial and ethnic composition Note: the US Census treats Hispanic/Latino as an ethnic category. This table excludes Latinos from the racial categories and assigns them to a separate category. Hispanics/Latinos may be of any race.
Race / Ethnicity (NH = Non-Hispanic)	Pop 2000	Pop 2010	Pop 2020	% 2000	% 2010	% 2020
White alone (NH)	3,004	3,220	2,717	40.25%	41.73%	41.75%
Black or African American alone (NH)	2,515	2,457	2,049	33.70%	31.84%	31.48%
Native American or Alaska Native alone (NH)	28	39	19	0.38%	0.51%	0.29%
Asian alone (NH)	91	145	131	1.22%	1.88%	2.01%
Native Hawaiian or Pacific Islander alone (NH)	8	17	33	0.11%	0.22%	0.51%
Other race alone (NH)	19	14	29	0.25%	0.18%	0.45%
Mixed race or Multiracial (NH)	98	167	241	1.31%	2.16%	3.70%
Hispanic or Latino (any race)	1,701	1,657	1,289	22.79%	21.47%	19.81%
Total	7,464	7,716	6,508	100.00%	100.00%	100.00%

=== 2010 census ===
The 2010 United States census counted 7,716 people, 784 households, and 590 families in the CDP. The population density was 751.9 per square mile (290.3/km^{2}). There were 898 housing units at an average density of 87.5 per square mile (33.8/km^{2}). The racial makeup was 52.57% (4,056) White, 34.47% (2,660) Black or African American, 0.67% (52) Native American, 1.91% (147) Asian, 0.30% (23) Pacific Islander, 6.07% (468) from other races, and 4.02% (310) from two or more races. Hispanic or Latino of any race were 21.47% (1,657) of the population.

Of the 784 households, 59.1% had children under the age of 18; 63.8% were married couples living together; 8.7% had a female householder with no husband present and 24.7% were non-families. Of all households, 15.1% were made up of individuals and 0.1% had someone living alone who was 65 years of age or older. The average household size was 3.05 and the average family size was 3.56.

12.1% of the population were under the age of 18, 4.2% from 18 to 24, 50.2% from 25 to 44, 30.9% from 45 to 64, and 2.6% who were 65 years of age or older. The median age was 38.9 years. For every 100 females, the population had 522.8 males. For every 100 females ages 18 and older there were 757.5 males.

== Transportation ==
New Jersey Route 68 links Fort Dix to U.S. Route 206 near the latter's interchanges with the New Jersey Turnpike, U.S. Route 130, and Interstate 295. New Jersey Transit provides service to and from Philadelphia on the 317 route.

== Education ==
The U.S. Census Bureau lists "Joint Base McGuire-Dix-Lakehurst" in Burlington County as having its own school district. Students attend area school district public schools, as the Department of Defense Education Activity does not operate any schools on that base. Students on McGuire and Dix may attend one of the following in their respective grade levels, with all siblings in a family taking the same choice: North Hanover Township School District (PK-6), Northern Burlington County Regional School District (7-12), and Pemberton Township School District (K-12).

The Pemberton district operates Fort Dix Elementary School, located on-post.

In prior years, Pemberton was the sole school district for Fort Dix. In 1988, 23% of the students in that district were from military families. In 1997, plans were made to shift the students, numbering around 700, to North Hanover schools. Pemberton school officials were against that move.

== Pop-culture references ==
Fort Dix is the home base setting in Cinemaware's 1988 C64 and Nintendo video game Rocket Ranger; the game is based on an alternate World War II scenario, wherein the National-Socialists discover lunarium, which could allow them to win the war unless a young American scientist stops them.

== Notable people ==
- Jay Berger (born 1966), a former professional tennis player, reached a highest world ranking of number seven.
- Bruce Hill (born 1964), is former wide receiver for the Tampa Bay Buccaneers.
- Jim Riggleman (born 1952) is a former professional baseball player and manager.
- Mel Brooks (born 1926) is an American actor, comedian, and filmmaker.
- Franco Harris (1950-2022) was a National Football League Hall of Fame running back, born at Fort Dix.
- Ralph Nader (born 1934) is a consumer advocate, lawyer, and four-time presidential candidate. He served as a US Army cook at Fort Dix in 1959.
- Elvis Presley (1935-1977) was an American singer and actor. Referred to as the “King of Rock and Roll,” he was discharged at the Fort Dix separation center.
- Ted Kennedy (1932-2009) was an American lawyer and politician who did basic training at Fort Dix.

== See also ==
- List of United States Army installations
- The 1976 swine flu outbreak
