= Jacobstown, New Jersey =

Populated place in Burlington County, New Jersey, US

- Unincorporated community
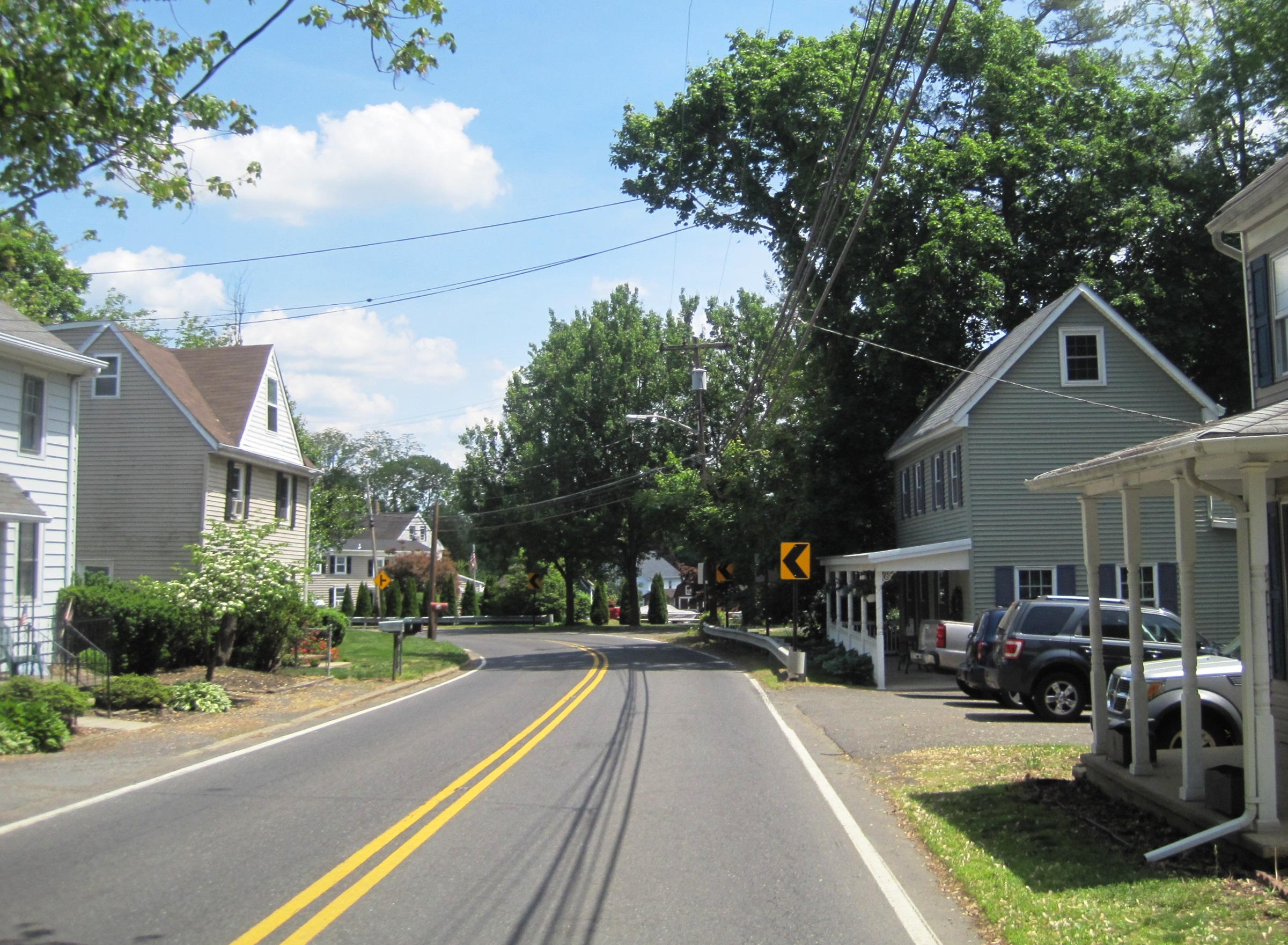
- Center of Jacobstown along CR 528

- Location in Burlington County (Inset: Burlington County in New Jersey) Jacobstown (New Jersey) Jacobstown (the United States)
- Coordinates: 40°04′33″N 74°35′00″W
- Country: United States
- State: New Jersey
- County: Burlington
- Township: North Hanover
- Named after: Jacob Andrew
- Elevation: 177 ft (54 m)
- Time zone: UTC−05:00 (Eastern (EST))
  - Summer (DST): UTC−04:00 (EDT)
- GNIS feature ID: 877402

Jacobstown is an unincorporated community located within North Hanover Township, in Burlington County, in the U.S. state of New Jersey. Jacobstown got its name from a Quaker named Jacob Andrew. The community houses the North Hanover Township municipal building, courthouse, and two elementary schools within the North Hanover Township School District.

== Notable people ==
People who were born in, residents of, or otherwise closely associated with Jacobstown include:

- Joe Borden (1854–1929), 19th century MLB pitcher.
