= Thai Airways International Flight 114 =

2001 aviation accident in Thailand

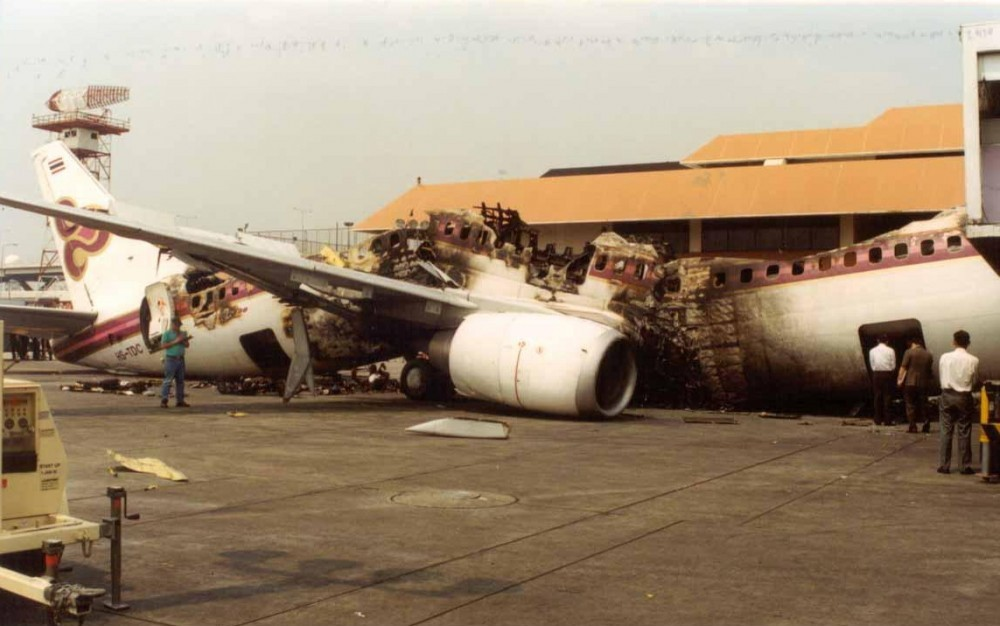
- The burnt-out wreckage of the aircraft

Accident
- Date: 3 March 2001
- Summary: Fuel tank explosion on the ground
- Site: Don Mueang International Airport, Bangkok, Thailand 13.91°N 100.6°E
- Total fatalities: 1
- Total injuries: 7

Aircraft
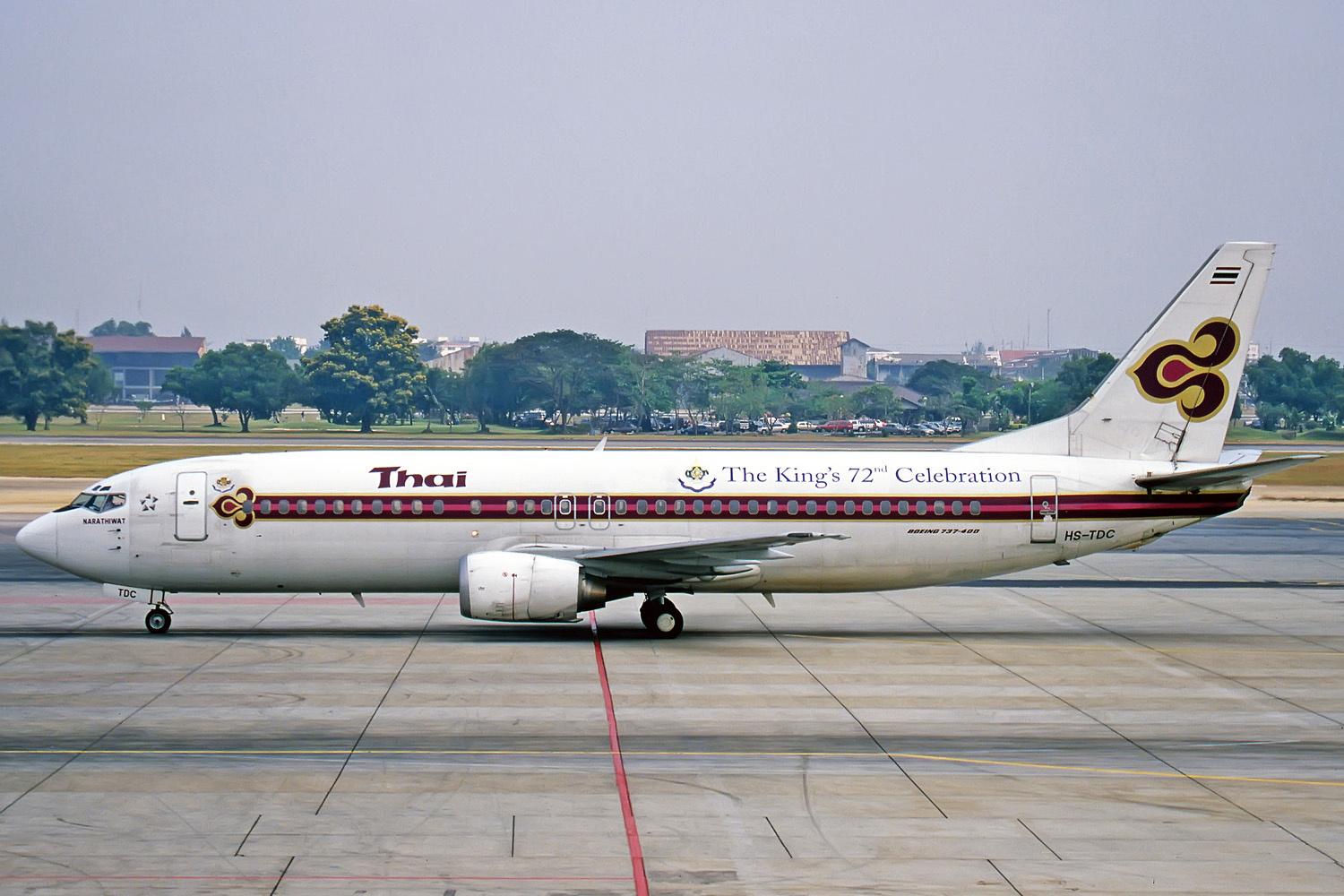
- HS-TDC, the aircraft involved in the accident, pictured in February 2001
- Aircraft type: Boeing 737-400
- Aircraft name: Narathiwat
- Operator: Thai Airways International
- IATA flight No.: TG114
- ICAO flight No.: THA114
- Call sign: THAI 114
- Registration: HS-TDC
- Flight origin: Don Mueang International Airport, Bangkok, Thailand
- Destination: Chiang Mai International Airport, Chiang Mai, Thailand
- Occupants: 8
- Crew: 8
- Fatalities: 1
- Injuries: 6
- Survivors: 7

Ground casualties
- Ground injuries: 1

On 3 March 2001, Thai Airways International Flight 114 exploded at gate 62 of Don Muang International Airport in Bangkok, Thailand, killing one person and injuring seven other people. Five cabin attendants, two baggage loaders, and a load control supervisor were preparing the Boeing 737-400 for a flight from Bangkok to Chiang Mai before the passengers were boarded. An explosion during this process started a fire that destroyed the aircraft. Six people on board and one person on the ground were injured while one cabin attendant was killed.

The passenger manifest included many government figures, including prime minister Thaksin Shinawatra, his son Panthongtae, and 20 other government officials. Initial reports from Thai officials suspected an assassination attempt using a bomb. Despite this, no evidence of an explosive device was found during examinations of the wreckage. The Aircraft Accident Investigation Committee determined that a flammable fuel-air mixture inside the center fuel tank ignited, likely due to sparks generated from an activated fuel pump with the presence of metal shavings.

== Background ==
The aircraft involved in the accident was a nine-year-old Boeing 737-400 delivered to Thai Airways International in 1991. It was registered as HS-TDC and named Narathiwat. It was powered by two CFM International CFM56-3C1 engines. Thai records indicate that it had accumulated 21,006 airframe hours. The aircraft was one of eleven Boeing 737-400 in the airline's fleet at the time of the accident. HS-TDC had flown four times on the day of the accident prior to the explosion.

Five cabin crew for the airline were on board at the time of the accident preparing the cabin for the flight; also inside the cabin was the load control supervisor. Two baggage loaders were inside the aft cargo compartment and had loaded all passenger luggage into the airplane by the time of the accident.

== Accident ==
On 3 March 2001, HS-TDC was scheduled to operate Flight 114 from Don Mueang International Airport in Bangkok to Chiang Mai International Airport in Chiang Mai. A total of 149 people were on the passenger manifest, the maximum capacity for the airline's Boeing 737-400s. (Note: The B737-400 involved in the incident was able to accommodate a total of 149 passengers and five crew members.) Among them included Thaksin Shinawatra, who was the prime minister of Thailand, his son Panthongtae Shinawatra, and 20 other government figures. The previous flight had landed at 2:14 pm ICT (UTC+07:00) and Flight 114 was scheduled to depart at 3:15 pm. The flight was minutes away from boarding passengers when at 2:40 pm, the aircraft exploded. (Note: The final report lists the time of the explosion at 2:48 pm. However, they also cite air traffic control transcripts where firefighting services were first alerted of the fire at 2:41 pm. The airline's press releases along with several news outlets list the time of the explosion at 2:40 pm or 35 minutes before the departure time of 3:15 pm.) The explosion originated from the front section of the Boeing 737, under the business class section. Witnesses reported seeing fire under the fuel tanks and smoke inside the cabin. Photographs showed a large fire spreading underneath the aircraft and smoke coming out of emergency exit doors.

At the time of the explosion, two cabin attendants were located within the first two rows of passenger seats, one cabin attendant was six rows behind them near the overwing exits, and two cabin attendants and the load control supervisor were in the back of the aircraft, near the aft galley. After the explosion, the two forward cabin attendants called out for the overwing cabin attendant and attempted to look for him. Ultimately, they evacuated without him through the partially blocked exit that linked the aircraft with a jetway. The crew in the aft galley evacuated by jumping out of the right rear door; the emergency slide was not armed to deploy when the door was opened. Everyone on board except for the overwing cabin attendant was able to evacuate. The overwing cabin attendant was incapacitated in the explosion and was not able to evacuate. Six out of the seven people inside the aircraft who survived sustained injuries and were treated at Vibhavadi Hospital. Seven people in total were injured.

Within one minute of the explosion, the Rescue and Fire Fighting Department (RFFD) of the Airports Authority of Thailand was notified of the fire. The first response equipment from the RFFD fire station arrived at the airplane at 2:45 pm. In total, the RFFD responded with 10 vehicles and 36 firefighters. The Royal Thai Air Force, which also had a fire station at the airport, responded with five vehicles and 25 firefighters. A second explosion occurred 18 minutes after the first explosion. The fire was brought under control at 3:20 pm, and was extinguished at 3:45 pm.

== Reactions ==
Thai Airways International held a press conference later on 3 March, where the company's president "expressed deepest sympathy" to the victims of the accident. The airline gave financial compensation to the family of the dead cabin attendant and to their injured staff. According to airline officials, an unplanned delay to the departure time prevented a "major national tragedy".

In the days immediately after the accident, speculation grew about it being a possible assassination attempt against Prime Minister Shinawatra. The Nation reported on unspecified sources within Thai Airways International's engineering department which said that the explosion originated from the area under seats 11A and 11B. They reported that these seats were reserved for the Shinawatra and his son. After being flown to Chiang Mai on an air force jet, Shinawatra told reporters, "It is clear now that it [the explosion] was not caused by the engine, but involved explosives". He said that he did not know if he was the intended target, but also believed that "there were no other important people on the flight". Local press reports believed an accidental fire to be "unlikely" as the engines were not on and the plane was refueled for the flight prior to the explosion. The Guardian reported that Shinawatra believed that if the explosion was a bomb, it was planted by someone who "had access to [his] schedule"; he had originally planned to go to Chiang Mai on 4 March, but had his secretary change his flight to Flight 114 on 3 March.

On 5 March, Minister of Defence Chavalit Yongchaiyudh said that the explosion was a planned attack, citing alleged claims of TNT and C-4 in the wreckage. The following day, Thai Airways International offered a reward of ฿500,000 to anyone who could provide information that would lead to the arrest of any suspects that were behind the explosion. Media reports and local police speculated that the explosion might have been caused by someone related to the drug trade inside the Golden Triangle; Prime Minister Shinawatra had pledged several times during his election campaign to crack down on the drug trade in the country. He had plans to hold a meeting the following week to enact preventive measures on drug traffickers operating out of Myanmar, one of the countries inside the Golden Triangle alongside Thailand.

== Investigation ==
A preliminary police report that was received by Panlop Pinmanee, a security advisor to the prime minister, claimed that explosives were found in the wreckage. Police General Prasarn Wongwai talked with Shinawatra, and reported that he said "he seems to have a clue who did it" but did not want to discuss too much because it "might pressure the investigation officials".

The Aircraft Accident Investigation Committee (AAIC) conducted the investigation under the conventions of the ICAO Annex 13. The National Transportation Safety Board (NTSB) of the United States, representing the country where the aircraft was manufactured, also participated in the investigation. They assisted with the analysis of the flight recorders and tests and research as part of the investigation process.

Personnel from the Royal Thai Air Force, Royal Thai Police, the NTSB, and the Federal Aviation Administration (FAA) examined the wreckage to find evidence of an explosive device. No evidence of an explosive device was found; no remnants of one were recovered and no evidence of associated structural damage was found. The AAIC sent samples of the wreckage to the Federal Bureau of Investigation (FBI) in the United States for analysis. The FBI used visual inspection and chromatography to analyze the samples for evidence of explosive residue, but failed to find any. Investigators concluded that the explosion was not a bomb, and started to focus on an accidental explosion inside the aircraft fuel tanks.

At the time of the accident, the left wing and right wing fuel tanks were refueled with 4,250 kg (9,370 lb) of fuel, but the center wing fuel tank (CWT) was not refueled. However, records indicated that it still contained approximately 80 kg (180 lb) of residual fuel at the time of the explosion. The structural damage to the aircraft showed signs of an explosion within the CWT; the upper surface of the tank was displaced upwards, and the lower surface was displaced downwards. The NTSB ran tests to determine whether the CWT was flammable at the time of the explosion. They discovered that with the air conditioning packs turned on, the CWT could have reached temperatures as high as 48 °C (118 °F). An analysis of the Jet A fuel inside of the fuel tanks concluded that it was flammable at 40 °C (104 °F), below the temperature of the CWT. The air conditioning packs, located under the CWT, had been running and generating heat for approximately 30 minutes after landing. The temperature outside was 36 °C (97 °F).

The fuel pumps were analyzed at FR-HiTemp facilities in Titchfield, United Kingdom, before being handed over to the NTSB for further analysis. Both left wing fuel pumps, the right forward wing fuel pump, and the left CWT fuel pump contained small metal shavings. All six fuel pumps showed sign of ingesting metal shavings at some point. The left CWT fuel pump had signs of grinding and small impact marks on the impeller. Inside the wing fuel tanks, pieces of debris from tank sealant, aluminum rivet heads, and portions of steel fasteners were discovered. Inside the left engine fuel filter, located downstream from the fuel pumps, the NTSB found small fragments of metal.

Despite the CWT not being refueled for the flight, the fuel pump switches located inside the cockpit for the CWT were in the "ON" position. Witness reported that the pilots for the flight and mechanics were inside the cockpit before the explosion. At least the left CWT fuel pump was dry running (operating without fuel) while the aircraft was on the ground. The AAIC determined that the dry running of the fuel pump with the ingestion of metal shavings may have produced a sparking event in a fuel-air mixture.

The flight recorders were extracted from the wreckage of the aircraft and were analyzed by the NTSB in the United States. The digital flight data recorder was not operating during the time of the explosion, but the cockpit voice recorder (CVR) was operating. The 30-minute CVR recording started as the previous flight of the aircraft was on final approach for landing. It recorded the aircraft landing, taxiing to the gate, and the passengers and crew disembarking without any abnormalities. The CVR recorded until the explosion and continued to run for 0.3 more seconds before it stopped recording. An analysis of the CVR sound spectrum closely matched with the CVRs of TWA Flight 800 and Philippine Airlines Flight 143, two other accidents caused by a fuel tank explosion, with a soundwave peaking before the recording stopped.

In their final report, the AAIC determined:

[T]he probable cause of this accident was an explosion of the CWT resulting from ignition of the flammable fuel/air mixture in the tank. The source of ignition energy for the explosion could not be determined with certainty, but the most likely source was an explosion originating at the CWT pump as a result of running the pump in the presence of metal shavings and a fuel/air mixture.

The AAIC issued two recommendations, one on the study and prevention of fuel tank explosions, and one on the airport fire response time for the RFFD.

== Aftermath ==
In April 2001, Boeing reissued recommendations to Boeing 737 operators to not turn on fuel pumps when the CWT had less than 453 kg (999 lb) of fuel. Later that month, the FAA issued an airworthiness directive to US airlines regarding the same issue. In 2004, the FAA announced its intention to require airliners to be fitted with inerting systems that would pump nitrogen into the fuel tanks to lower the amount of oxygen and reduce the flammability of fuel vapors inside aircraft fuel tanks. In 2008, the FAA mandated that all airliners built after 1991 would have to be installed with a fuel inerting system.

== See also ==
- Pan Am Flight 214
- Imperial Iranian Air Force Flight 48
- TWA Flight 800
- China Airlines Flight 120
- Philippine Airlines Flight 143
