= Inerting system =

System for inhibiting fuel tank combustion

An inerting system decreases the probability of combustion of flammable materials stored in a confined space. The most common such system is a fuel tank containing a combustible liquid, such as gasoline, diesel fuel, aviation fuel, jet fuel, or rocket propellant. After being fully filled, and during use, there is a space above the fuel, called the ullage, that contains evaporated fuel mixed with air, which contains the oxygen necessary for combustion. Under the right conditions this mixture can ignite. An inerting system replaces the air with a gas that cannot support combustion, such as nitrogen.

== Principle of operation ==
Three elements are required to initiate and sustain combustion in the ullage: an ignition source (heat), fuel, and oxygen. Combustion may be prevented by reducing any one of these three elements. In many cases there is no ignition source, e.g. storage tanks. If the presence of an ignition source can not be prevented, as is the case with most tanks that feed fuel to internal combustion engines, then the tank may be made non-ignitable by progressively adding an inert gas to the ullage as the fuel is consumed. At present carbon dioxide or nitrogen are used almost exclusively, although some systems use nitrogen-enriched air, or steam. Using these inert gases reduces the oxygen concentration of the ullage to below the combustion threshold.

== Oil tankers ==
Oil tankers fill the empty space above the oil cargo with inert gas to prevent fire or explosion of hydrocarbon vapors. Oil vapors cannot burn in air with less than 11% oxygen content. The inert gas may be supplied by cooling and scrubbing the flue gas produced by the ship's boilers. Where diesel engines are used, the exhaust gas may contain too much oxygen so fuel-burning inert gas generators may be installed. One-way valves are installed in process piping to the tanker spaces to prevent volatile hydrocarbon vapors or mist from entering other equipment. Inert gas systems have been required on oil tankers since the SOLAS regulations of 1974. The International Maritime Organization (IMO) publishes technical standard IMO-860 describing the requirements for inert gas systems. Other types of cargo such as bulk chemicals may also be carried in inerted tanks, but the inerting gas must be compatible with the chemicals used.

== Aircraft ==
Fuel tanks for combat aircraft have long been inerted, as well as being self-sealing, but those for military cargo aircraft and civilian transport category aircraft usually were not. Early applications using nitrogen were on the Handley Page Halifax III and VIII, Short Stirling, and Avro Lincoln B.II, which incorporated inerting systems from around 1944.

Cleve Kimmel first proposed an inerting system to passenger airlines in the early 1960s. His proposed system for passenger aircraft would have used nitrogen. However, the US Federal Aviation Administration (FAA) did not mandate installation of an inerting system at that time. Early versions of Kimmel's system weighed 2,000 pounds. The FAA focused on keeping ignition sources out of the fuel tanks.

The FAA did not formally propose lightweight inerting systems for commercial jets until the 1996 explosion of TWA Flight 800, a Boeing 747, caused by the ignition of fuel-air vapours in the center wing fuel tank. This tank is normally used only on very long flights, and little fuel was present in the tank at the time of the explosion. A small amount of fuel in a tank is more dangerous than a large amount, since it takes less heat to raise the temperature of the remaining fuel. This causes the ullage fuel-to-air ratio to increase and exceed the lower flammability limit. A small amount of fuel in the tank leaves pumps on the floor of the tank exposed to the air-fuel mixture, and an electric pump is a potential ignition source. The explosion of a Thai Airways International Boeing 737 in 2001 and a Philippine Airlines 737 in 1990 also occurred in tanks that had a small amount of residual fuel. These three explosions occurred on warm days, in the center wing tank (CWT) that is within the contours of the fuselage. These fuel tanks are located in the vicinity of external equipment that inadvertently heats the fuel tanks. The National Transportation Safety Board's (NTSB) final report on the crash of the TWA 747 concluded "The fuel air vapor in the ullage of the TWA flight 800 CWT was flammable at the time of the accident". NTSB identified "Elimination of Explosive Mixture in Fuel tanks in Transport Category Aircraft" as Number 1 item on its Most Wanted List in 1997.

After the TWA Flight 800 crash, a 2001 report by an FAA committee stated that U.S. airlines would have to spend US$35 billion to retrofit their existing aircraft fleets with inerting systems that might prevent such explosions. However, another FAA group developed a nitrogen-enriched air (NEA) based inerting system prototype that operated on compressed air supplied by the aircraft's propulsive engines. Also, the FAA determined that the fuel tank could be rendered inert by reducing the ullage oxygen concentration to 12% rather than the previously accepted threshold of 9 to 10%. Boeing commenced testing a derivative system of their own, performing successful test flights in 2003 with several Boeing 747 aircraft.

The new, simplified inerting system based on membrane gas separation technology was originally suggested to the FAA through public comment. It uses a hollow fiber membrane material to separate supplied air into nitrogen-enriched air (NEA) and oxygen enriched air (OEA). This technology is extensively used for generating oxygen-enriched air for medical purposes. It uses a membrane that preferentially allows the nitrogen molecule (molecular weight 28) to pass through it but not the oxygen molecule (molecular weight 32).

Unlike the inerting systems on military aircraft, this inerting system runs continuously to reduce fuel vapor flammability whenever the aircraft's engines are running. The goal is to reduce oxygen content within the fuel tank to 12%, lower than normal atmospheric oxygen content of 21%, but higher than that of inerted military aircraft fuel tanks, which have a target of 9% oxygen. Inerting in military aircraft is typically accomplished by ventilating fuel-vapor laden ullage gas out of the tank and into the atmosphere.

=== FAA rules ===
After what it said was seven years of investigation, the FAA proposed a rule in November 2005, in response to an NTSB recommendation, which would require airlines to "reduce the flammability levels of fuel tank vapors on the ground and in the air". This was a shift from the previous 40 years of policy in which the FAA focused only on reducing possible sources of ignition of fuel tank vapors.

The FAA issued the final rule on 21 July 2008. The rule amends regulations applicable to the design of new airplanes (14CFR§25.981), and introduces new regulations for continued safety (14CFR§26.31–39), Operating Requirements for Domestic Operations (14CFR§121.1117) and Operating Requirements for Foreign Air Carriers (14CFR§129.117). The regulations apply to airplanes certificated after 1 January 1958 of passenger capacity of 30 or more or payload capacity of greater than 7500 pounds. The regulations are performance based and do not require the implementation of a particular method.

The proposed rule would affect all future fixed-wing aircraft designs (passenger capacity greater than 30), and require a retrofit of more than 3,200 Airbus and Boeing aircraft with center wing fuel tanks, over nine years. The FAA had initially planned to also order installation on cargo aircraft, but this was removed from the order by the Bush administration. Additionally, regional jets and smaller commuter planes would not be subject to the rule, because the FAA does not consider them at high risk for a fuel-tank explosion. The FAA estimated the cost of the program at US$808 million over the next 49 years, including US$313 million to retrofit the existing fleet. It compared this cost to an estimated US$1.2 billion "cost to society" from a large airliner exploding in mid-air. The proposed rule came at a time when nearly half of the U.S. airlines' capacity was on carriers that were in bankruptcy.

The order affects aircraft whose air conditioning units have a possibility of heating up what can be considered a normally empty center wing fuel tank. Some Airbus A320 and Boeing 747 aircraft are slated for "early action". Regarding new aircraft designs, the Airbus A380 does not have a center wing fuel tank and is therefore exempt, and the Boeing 787 has a fuel tank safety system that already complies with the proposed rule. The FAA has stated that there have been four fuel tank explosions in the previous 16 years—two on the ground, and two in the air—and that based on this statistic and on the FAA's estimate that one such explosion would happen every 60 million hours of flight time, about 9 such explosions will probably occur in the next 50 years. The inerting systems will probably prevent 8 of those 9 probable explosions, the FAA said. Before the inerting system rule was proposed, Boeing stated that it would install its own inerting system on airliners it manufactures beginning in 2005. Airbus had argued that its planes' electrical wiring made the inerting system an unnecessary expense.

As of 2009, the FAA had a pending rule to increase the standards of on board inerting systems again. New technologies are being developed by others to provide fuel tank inerting:

1. The On-Board Inert Gas Generation System (OBIGGS) system, tested in 2004 by the FAA and NASA, with an opinion written by the FAA in 2005. This system is currently in use by many military aircraft types, including the C-17. This system provides the level of safety that the proposed increase in standards by the proposed FAA rules has been written around. Critics of this system cite the high maintenance cost reported by the military.
2. Three independent research and development firms have proposed new technologies in response to Research & Development grants by the FAA and SBA. The focus of these grants is to develop a system that is superior to OBIGGS that can replace classic inerting methods. None of these approaches has been validated in the general scientific community, nor have these efforts produced commercially available products. All the firms have issued press releases or given non-peer reviewed talks.

=== Other methods ===
Another method in current use to inert fuel tanks is an ullage system. The FAA has decided that the added weight of an ullage system makes it impractical for implementation in the aviation field. Some U.S. military aircraft still use nitrogen based foam inerting systems, and some companies will ship containers of fuel with an ullage system across rail transportation routes.

== See also ==
- Dilution (equation)
- Oxygen reduction system
- Tank blanketing
