= TWA Flight 800 =

1996 aviation accident in the Atlantic Ocean

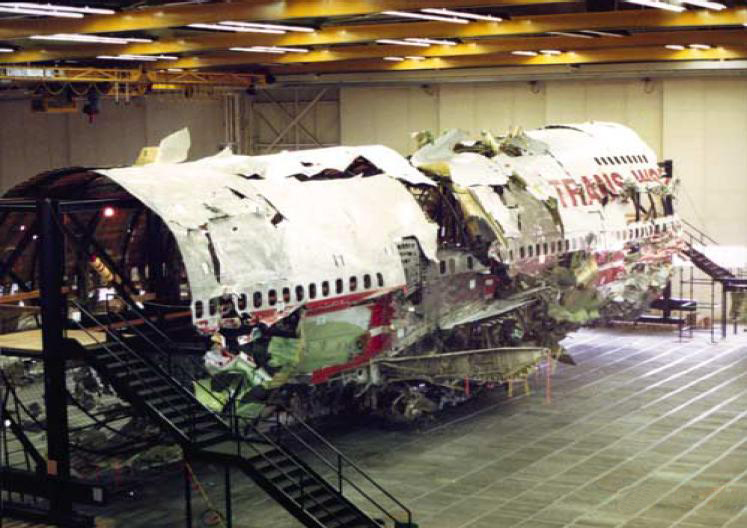
- The reconstructed wreckage of the aircraft, formerly stored by the NTSB at Calverton Executive Airpark before being scrapped

Accident
- Date: July 17, 1996
- Summary: In-flight breakup due to explosion in center wing fuel tank caused by short circuit
- Site: Atlantic Ocean, near East Moriches, New York, United States; 40°38′57″N 72°38′13″W

Aircraft
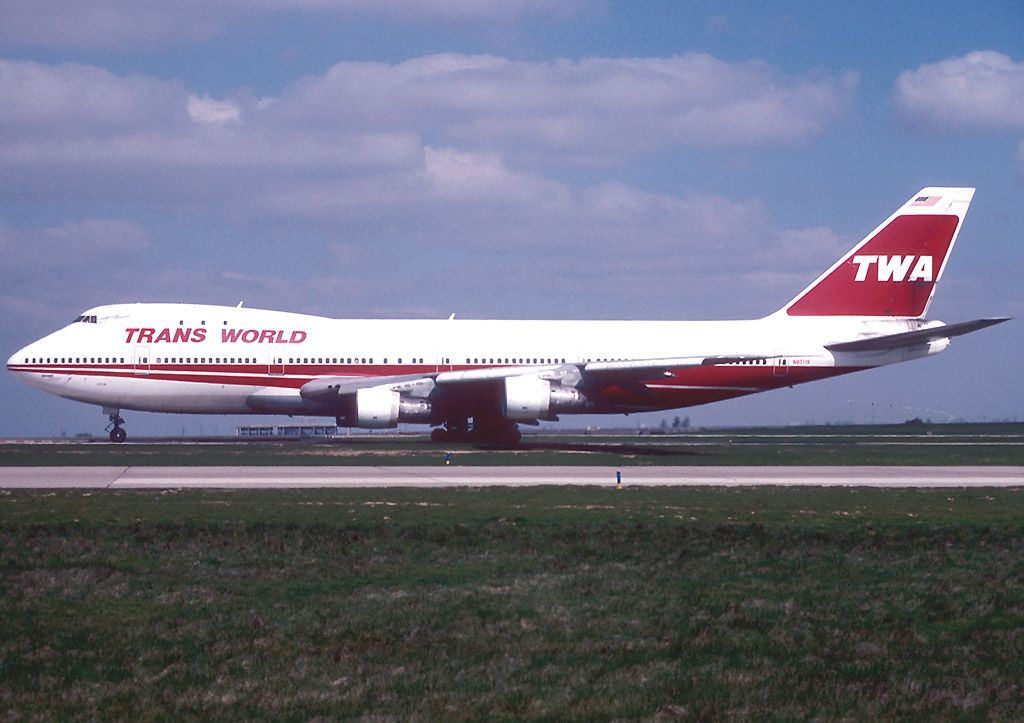
- N93119, the aircraft involved in the accident, pictured in 1995
- Aircraft type: Boeing 747-131
- Operator: Trans World Airlines
- IATA flight No.: TW800
- ICAO flight No.: TWA800
- Call sign: TWA 800
- Registration: N93119
- Flight origin: John F. Kennedy Int'l Airport, New York City, United States
- Stopover: Charles de Gaulle Airport, Paris, France
- Destination: Leonardo da Vinci Airport, Rome, Italy
- Occupants: 230
- Passengers: 212
- Crew: 18
- Fatalities: 230
- Survivors: 0

TWA Flight 800 (Note: The airline codes were (TW800/TWA800).) was a regularly scheduled Trans World Airlines international passenger flight from John F. Kennedy International Airport in New York City, United States, to Fiumicino Airport in Rome, Italy, with a stopover at Charles de Gaulle Airport in Paris, France. On July 17, 1996, at approximately 8:31 p.m. EDT, or 20:31, twelve minutes after takeoff, the Boeing 747-100 performing this flight exploded and crashed into the Atlantic Ocean near East Moriches, New York.

All 230 people on board were killed in the crash; it is the third-deadliest aviation accident in U.S. history. Accident investigators from the National Transportation Safety Board (NTSB) traveled to the scene, arriving the following morning amid speculation that a terrorist attack was the cause of the crash. The Federal Bureau of Investigation (FBI) and New York Police Department Joint Terrorism Task Force (JTTF) initiated a joint criminal investigation. Sixteen months later, the JTTF announced that no evidence of a criminal act had been found and closed its active investigation.

The four-year NTSB investigation concluded with the approval of the Aircraft Accident Report on August 23, 2000, ending the most extensive, complex, and costly air disaster investigation in U.S. history up to that time. The report's conclusion was that the probable cause of the accident was the explosion of flammable fuel vapors in the center fuel tank. Although it could not be determined with certainty, the likely ignition source was a short circuit. Problems with the aircraft's wiring were found, including evidence of arcing in the fuel quantity indication system (FQIS) wiring that enters the tank. The FQIS on Flight 800 is known to have been malfunctioning: the captain remarked about "crazy" readings from the system about two minutes and 30 seconds before the aircraft exploded. As a result of the investigation, new requirements were developed for aircraft to prevent future fuel-tank explosions.

== Accident ==
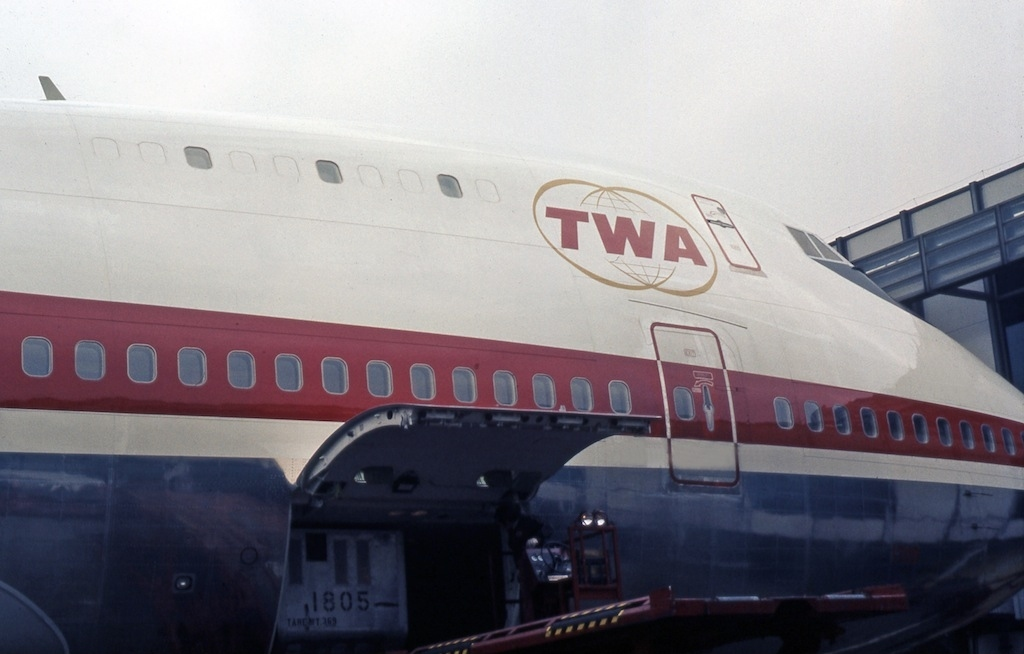
The close-up view of N93119's front fuselage, in 1972, showing the seven plugged windows on the upper deck. These plugs were blown out following the explosion of Flight 800.

On the day of the accident, the airplane departed from Ellinikon International Airport in Athens, Greece, as TWA Flight 881 and arrived at John F. Kennedy International Airport at about 4:38 p.m. The aircraft was then refueled and the crew was changed.

The new crew was led by 58-year-old Captain Ralph G. Kevorkian, who had flown for TWA for 31 years and the U.S. Air Force for nine years and had logged 18,700 flight hours, including 5,490 on the Boeing 747. Captain/check airman Steven E. Snyder, 57, had flown for TWA for 32 years and had logged 17,200 flight hours, including 4,700 on the Boeing 747. Flight engineer/check airman Richard G. Campbell Jr., 63, had flown for TWA for 30 years and the U.S. Air Force for 12 years and had logged 18,500 flight hours, including 3,800 on the Boeing 747. Also with the crew was 25-year-old flight engineer trainee Oliver Krick, who previously served as a business pilot for four years and had 2,520 flight hours, including 30 on the Boeing 747. Krick had flown for TWA for 26 days and was starting the sixth leg of his initial operating experience training. Flight 800 was actually a training flight for Kevorkian, and he was seated in the captain's (left) seat. Captain Snyder was seated in the first officer's (right) seat monitoring Kevorkian's progress. Flight Engineer Campbell was seated in the cockpit jump seat. Flight engineer trainee Krick was seated in the flight engineer's seat being monitored by Campbell. The NTSB Final Report incorrectly gave Krick's age as being 24, while the TWA press release correctly gave it as 25, as Krick turned 25 on July 14, three days before the crash.

The cabin crew team of 15 consisted of Flight Service Manager Jacques Charbonnier (65) with 36 years' service at TWA, flight attendants Arlene Johnson (60) with 36 years' service, Connie Charbonnier (49) with 27 years' service, Maureen Lockhart (49) with 26 years' service, Marit Rhoads (48) with 26 years' service, Melinda Torche (46) with 26 years' service, Janet Christopher (47) with 26 years' service, Debra Diluccio (47) with 25 years' service, Mike Schuldt (51) with 23 years' service, Grace Melotin (48) with 23 years' service, Sandra Meade (42) with 21 years' service, Ray Lang (51) with 20 years' service, Dan Callas (21) with 3 months' service, and Jill Zienkiewicz (23) with 2 months' service.

The ground-maintenance crew locked out the thrust reverser for engine No. 3 (treated as a minimum equipment list item) because of technical problems with the thrust reverser sensors during the landing of TWA 881 at JFK, before Flight 800's departure. Additionally, severed cables for the engine's thrust reverser were replaced. During refueling of the aircraft, the volumetric shutoff (VSO) control was believed to have been triggered before the tanks were full. To continue the pressure fueling, a TWA mechanic overrode the automatic VSO by pulling the volumetric fuse and an overflow circuit breaker. Maintenance records indicate that the aircraft had numerous VSO-related maintenance writeups in the weeks before the accident.

TWA 800 was scheduled to depart JFK for Charles de Gaulle Airport around 7:00 p.m., but the flight's pushback was delayed until 8:02 p.m. by a disabled piece of ground equipment and a passenger/baggage mismatch. After the owner of the baggage in question was confirmed to be on board, the flight crew prepared for departure, and the aircraft pushed back from Gate 27 at the TWA Flight Center. The flight crew started the engines at 8:04 p.m. However, because of the previous maintenance undertaken on engine No. 3, the flight crew only started engines No. 1, No. 2, and No. 4. Engine No. 3 was started 10 minutes later during taxi at 8:14 p.m. The initial departure was uneventful, with the 747 taking off from Runway 22R five minutes later at 8:19 p.m.

Flight path of TWA 800: The colored rectangles are areas from which wreckage was recovered.

TWA 800 then received a series of heading changes and generally increasing altitude assignments as it climbed to its intended cruising altitude. Weather in the area was light winds with scattered clouds, with dusk lighting conditions. The last radio transmission from the airplane occurred at 8:30 p.m., when the flight crew received and then acknowledged instructions from Boston Center to climb to 15,000 feet (4,600 m). The last recorded radar transponder return from the airplane was recorded by the Federal Aviation Administration (FAA) radar site at Trevose, Pennsylvania, at 8:31:12 p.m.

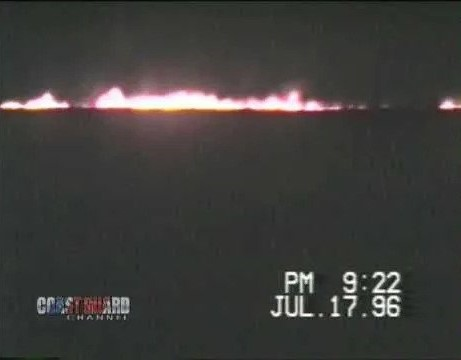
Burning wreckage of Flight 800 on the surface of the Atlantic Ocean

Thirty-eight seconds later, David McClaine, the captain of Eastwind Airlines Flight 507, a Boeing 737-221 registered N221US (which had suffered a near-crash of its own a month prior) reported to Boston ARTCC that he "just saw an explosion out here", adding, "we just saw an explosion up ahead of us here ... about 16,000 feet [4,900 m] or something like that, it just went down... into the water." Subsequently, many air traffic control facilities in the New York City and Long Island areas received reports of an explosion from other pilots operating in the area. Many witnesses in the vicinity of the crash stated that they saw or heard explosions, accompanied by a large fireball(s) over the ocean, and observed debris, some of which was burning while falling into the water. Various civilian, military, and police vessels reached the crash site within minutes of the initial water impact. They searched for survivors but found none, making TWA 800 the second-deadliest aircraft accident in United States history at that time, behind American Airlines Flight 191.

== Background ==
=== Aircraft ===
The aircraft involved, manufactured in July 1971, was a Boeing 747-131 registered as N93119 with serial number 20083. It had completed 16,869 flights in 93,303 hours of operation and was powered by four Pratt & Whitney JT9D-7AH turbofan engines.

=== Crew and passengers ===
Nationality	Passengers	Crew	Total
France	40	—N/a	40
Ivory Coast	1	—N/a	1
Germany	1	—N/a	1
Israel	1	—N/a	1
Italy	7	1	8
Norway	2	—N/a	2
Spain	2	—N/a	2
Sweden	1	—N/a	1
Portugal	5	—N/a	5
United States	152	17	169
Total	212	18	230

Love's Embrace, a statue of Pam Lychner and her daughters, Shannon and Katie, in Spring Valley Village, Texas. All three were killed on board TWA Flight 800.

On board TWA 800 were 230 people, including 18 crew and 20 off-duty TWA employees, most of whom were crew meant to cover the Paris–Rome leg of the flight. Seventeen crew members and 152 of the passengers were Americans; the remaining crew member was Italian, while the remaining passengers were of various other nationalities. Notable passengers included:

- Michel Breistroff, French ice hockey player
- Marcel Dadi, French guitarist
- David Hogan, American composer
- Jed Johnson, Andy Warhol's partner of twelve years, interior designer, and director
- Pam Lychner, American crime victims' rights advocate and former TWA flight attendant, along with two daughters
- Rico Puhlmann, German fashion photographer. One of his clients, Polish fashion model Agnieszka Kotlarska (Miss Polski and Miss International), was originally supposed to be on the flight with him but backed out at the last minute. She was murdered a month later by a stalker outside her home.
- Courtney Elizabeth Johns, sister of future comic book writer Geoff Johns and the inspiration for the DC Comics superhero Courtney Whitmore / Stargirl
- Ana Maria Shorter, musician Wayne Shorter's second wife, and the couple's niece, Dalila, daughter of singer Jon Lucien
- Jack O'Hara, executive producer of ABC Sports, along with his wife and daughter. He was going to France to supervise coverage of the Tour de France in what was to be his last assignment for the network after being dismissed the previous week.

In addition, 16 students and five adult chaperones from the French Club of the Montoursville Area High School in Pennsylvania were on board.

== Initial investigation ==
The NTSB was notified at approximately 8:50 p.m. on the day of the accident. A full "go team" was assembled in Washington, D.C. The team arrived on the scene early the next morning. Meanwhile, initial witness descriptions led many to believe that the cause of the crash was a bomb or surface-to-air missile attack. As the NTSB does not investigate criminal activity, the United States Attorney General is empowered to declare an investigation for accidents that are potentially linked to a criminal act and to require the NTSB to relinquish control of the investigation to the FBI. In the case of TWA 800, the FBI initiated a parallel criminal investigation alongside the NTSB's accident investigation.

=== Search-and-recovery operations ===
Search-and-recovery operations were conducted by federal, state, and local agencies, as well as by government contractors. Personnel in an HH-60 Pave Hawk helicopter of the New York Air National Guard witnessed the explosion from about eight miles (13 km) away and arrived at the scene of the explosion while debris was still falling into the water, forcing the crew to retreat. They reported their sighting to the tower at Suffolk County Airport. Remotely operated vehicles (ROVs), side-scan sonar and laser line-scanning equipment were employed to search for and investigate underwater debris fields. Victims and wreckage were recovered by scuba divers and ROVs. Later, scallop trawlers were used to recover wreckage embedded in the sea floor. In one of the largest diver-assisted salvage operations ever conducted, often working in very difficult and dangerous conditions, more than 95% of the airplane wreckage was eventually recovered. The search-and-recovery effort identified three main areas of wreckage underwater, which were classified by color. The yellow, red, and green zones contained wreckage from the front, center, and rear sections of the airplane, respectively. The green zone with the aft portion of the aircraft was located the farthest along the flight path.

Wreckage recovered with tangled and damaged wires attached

Pieces of wreckage were transported by boat to shore and then by truck to leased hangar space at the former Grumman Aircraft facility in Calverton, New York for storage, examination, and reconstruction. The facility became the command center and headquarters for the investigation. NTSB and FBI personnel were present to observe all transfers to preserve the evidentiary value of the wreckage. The cockpit voice recorder and flight data recorder were recovered by U.S. Navy divers one week after the accident, and the machines were immediately shipped to the NTSB laboratory in Washington, D.C. for analysis. The victims' remains were transported to the Suffolk County Medical Examiner's office in Hauppauge, New York.

=== Tensions in the investigation ===
Relatives of TWA 800 passengers and crew, as well as the media, gathered at the Ramada Plaza JFK Hotel. Many waited until the remains of their family members had been recovered, identified and released. This hotel became known as the "Heartbreak Hotel" for its role in hosting families of victims of several airliner crashes.

Many grieving relatives became angry because of TWA's delayed confirmation of the passenger list, conflicting information from agencies and officials and mistrust of the recovery operation's priorities. Although NTSB vice chairman Robert Francis stated that all bodies were retrieved as soon as they were spotted and that wreckage was recovered only if divers believed that victims were hidden underneath, many families suspected that investigators were untruthful or withheld information.

Anger and political pressure were also directed at Suffolk County medical examiner Charles V. Wetli as recovered bodies backlogged at the morgue. Under constant pressure to identify victims with minimal delay, pathologists worked long hours. While some victims' bodies were generally intact, most others were burned, fragmented, skeletonized, or decaying, necessitating identification using DNA testing and dental records. As the primary objective was to identify all remains rather than to perform detailed forensic autopsies, the thoroughness of the examinations was highly variable. Ultimately, the remains of all 230 victims were recovered and identified, and the final victim identification occurred more than 10 months after the crash.

With lines of authority unclear, differences in agendas and culture between the FBI and NTSB resulted in discord. The FBI, assuming that a criminal act had occurred, saw the NTSB as indecisive. Expressing frustration at the NTSB's unwillingness to speculate on a cause, one FBI agent described the NTSB as "No opinions. No nothing." Meanwhile, the NTSB was required to refute or minimize speculation about conclusions and evidence, frequently supplied to reporters by law-enforcement officials and politicians. The International Association of Machinists and Aerospace Workers, an invited party to the NTSB investigation, criticized the undocumented removal by FBI agents of wreckage from the hangar where it was stored.

=== Witness interviews ===
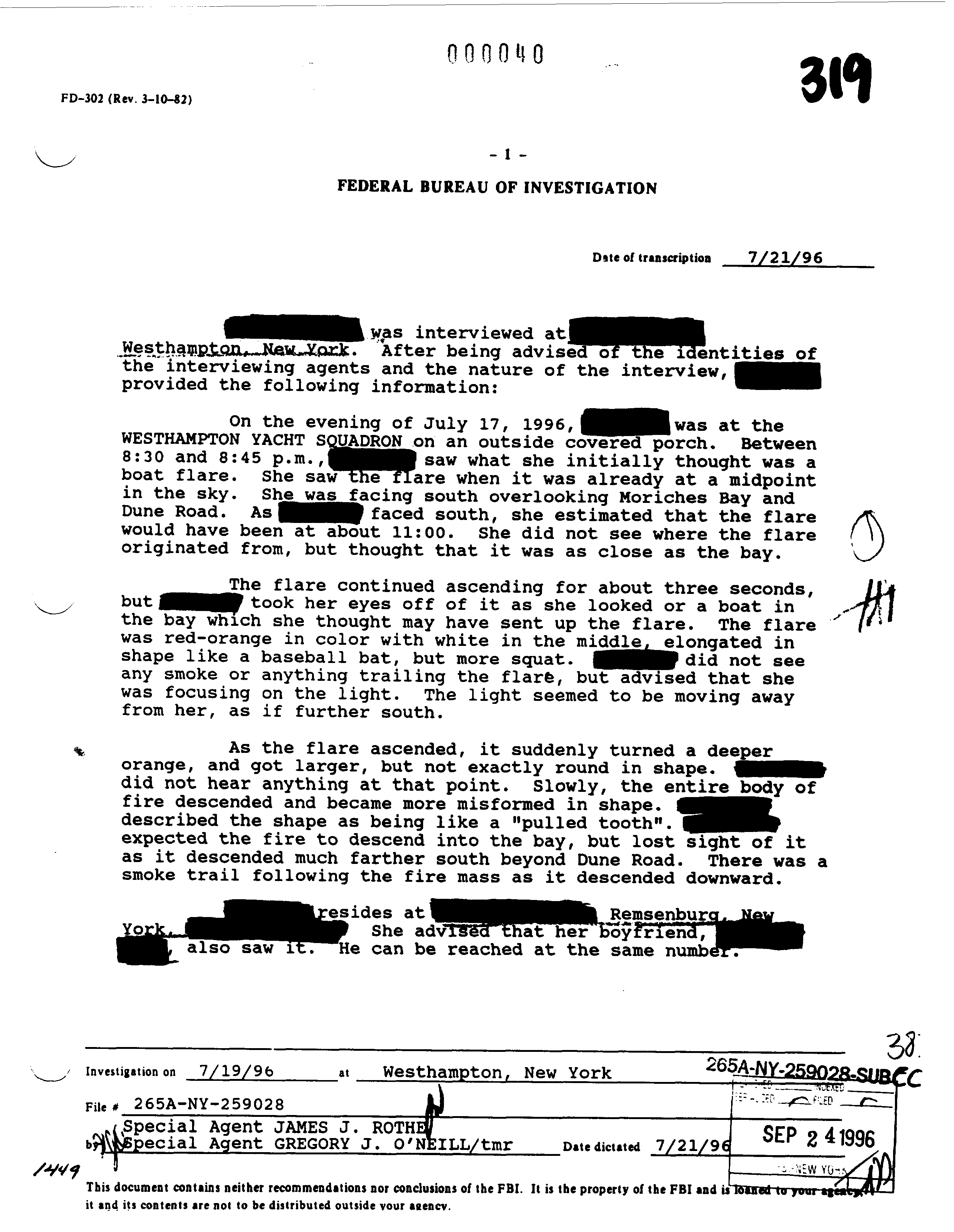
An FBI witness statement summary (with personal information redacted)

Although considerable discrepancies existed among the many witness accounts, most had seen a "streak of light", described by 38 of 258 witnesses as ascending, moving to a point where a large fireball appeared. Several witnesses reported that the fireball divided into two parts as it descended toward the water. Intense public interest arose regarding the witness reports, as did much speculation that the reported streak of light was a missile that had struck TWA 800, causing the airplane to explode. These witness accounts were a major reason for the initiation and duration of the FBI's criminal investigation.

Approximately 80 FBI agents conducted interviews with potential witnesses daily. No verbatim records of the witness interviews were produced; instead, the agents who conducted the interviews wrote summaries that they then submitted. Witnesses were not asked to review or correct the summaries. Included in some of the witness summaries were drawings or diagrams of what the witnesses had observed.

Within days of the crash, the NTSB announced its intent to form its own witness group and to interview witnesses to the crash. After the FBI raised concerns about nongovernmental parties in the NTSB's investigation having access to this information and possible prosecutorial difficulties resulting from multiple interviews of the same witnesses, the NTSB deferred and did not interview witnesses. A safety board investigator later reviewed FBI interview notes and briefed other board investigators on their contents. In November 1996, the FBI agreed to allow the NTSB access to summaries of witness accounts in which personally identifying information had been redacted and to conduct a limited number of witness interviews. In April 1998, the FBI provided the NTSB with the identities of the witnesses, but because of the time that had elapsed, a decision was made to rely on the original FBI documents rather than on reinterviewed witnesses.

== Further investigation and analysis ==
Examination of the cockpit voice recorder (CVR) and flight data recorder data showed a normal takeoff and climb, with the aircraft in normal flight before both abruptly stopped at 8:31:12 p.m. At 8:29:15 p.m., Captain Kevorkian was heard to say, "Look at that crazy fuel flow indicator there on number four... " Eight seconds later, Kevorkian again saw the vertical indicator make another hop. "See that?" he asked. There was no response from anyone else on the flight deck. There had been nine instances of incorrect readings in the previous two years leading up to the accident, though no exact cause could be found. Intermittent electrical malfunctions are typically symptomatic of potential wiring degradation, and among other issues on Flight 800 pre-departure it was noted that refuelers reported difficulty trying to fill the wing tanks, linked to a faulty volumetric fuel gauge. There had been eight reports of similar difficulty in the previous four months, to bypass the fault fuel technicians overrode the fuel shutoff by pulling the circuit breaker, alternating a switch and proceeding to load the tank with Jet A fuel.

A loud noise recorded on the last few tenths of a second of the CVR was similar to noises recorded from other airplanes that had experienced in-flight breakups. This, together with the distribution of wreckage and witness reports indicated a sudden, catastrophic in-flight breakup of TWA 800.

=== Possible causes of the in-flight breakup ===
Investigators considered several possible causes for the structural breakup: structural failure and decompression, detonation of a high-energy explosive device such as a missile warhead exploding either upon impact with the airplane or just before impact, a bomb exploding inside the airplane or a fuel-air explosion in the center-wing fuel tank.

==== Structural failure and decompression ====
Close examination of the wreckage revealed no evidence of structural faults such as fatigue, corrosion, or mechanical damage that could have caused the in-flight breakup. The breakup could have been initiated by an in-flight separation of the forward cargo door as had occurred in the Turkish Airlines Flight 981 or United Airlines Flight 811 accidents, but all evidence indicated that the door was closed and locked at impact. The NTSB concluded that "the in-flight breakup of TWA flight 800 was not initiated by a pre-existing condition resulting in a structural failure and decompression."

==== Missile or bomb detonation ====
A review of recorded data from long-range and airport surveillance radars revealed multiple contacts of airplanes or objects in TWA 800's vicinity at the time of the accident. None of these contacts intersected TWA 800's position at any time. Attention was drawn to data from the Islip, New York ARTCC facility that showed three tracks in the vicinity of TWA 800 that did not appear in any of the other radar data. None of these sequences intersected TWA 800's position at any time. None of the reviewed data showed radar returns consistent with a missile or other projectile traveling toward TWA 800.

The NTSB addressed allegations that the Islip radar data showed groups of military surface targets converging suspiciously in an area around the accident and that an unidentified 30-knot radar track, 3 nautical miles (5.6 km; 3.5 mi) from the crash site, was involved in foul play, as evidenced by its failure to divert from its course and assist with the search-and-rescue operations. Military records examined by the NTSB showed no military surface vessels within 15 nautical miles (28 km; 17 mi) of TWA 800 at the time of the accident. In addition, the records indicated that the closest area scheduled for military use, warning area W-387A/B, was 160 nautical miles (296 km; 184 mi) south.

The NTSB reviewed the 30-knot target track to determine why it had not diverted from its course to proceed to the area where the TWA 800 wreckage had fallen. TWA 800 was behind the target, and with the target's occupants likely looking forward, they would not have been in a position to observe the aircraft's breakup, subsequent explosions, or fireballs. The occupants of the target track were unlikely to have been able to hear the explosions over the sound of their craft's engines and the noise of the hull traveling through water, especially if the occupants were in an enclosed bridge or cabin. Further, review of the Islip radar data for similar summer days and nights in 1999 indicated that the 30-knot track was consistent with normal commercial fishing, recreational, and cargo-vessel traffic. The source of the 30-knot target track was never identified.

Recorded radar data

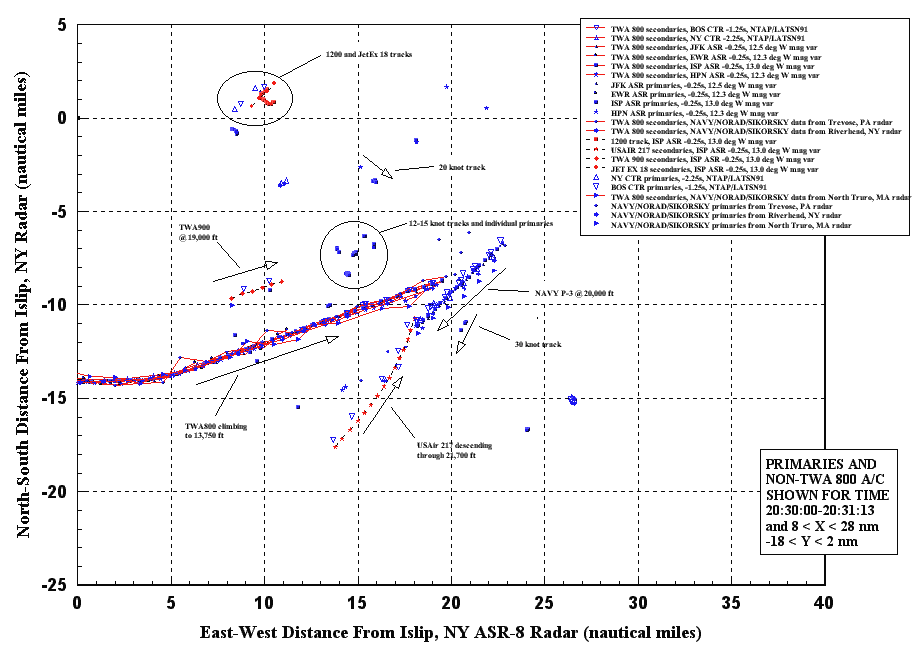
Radar data showing vehicle and/or object tracks within 10 nautical miles (19 km; 12 mi) of TWA flight 800 just before the accident.

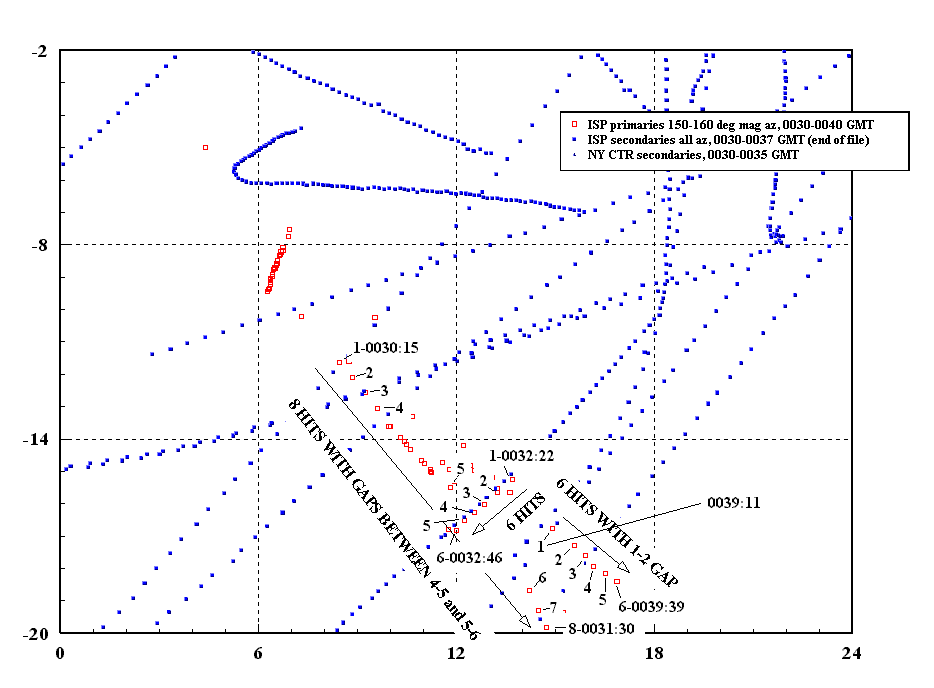
Three sequences of primary returns near TWA 800 that were only recorded by the Islip radar.

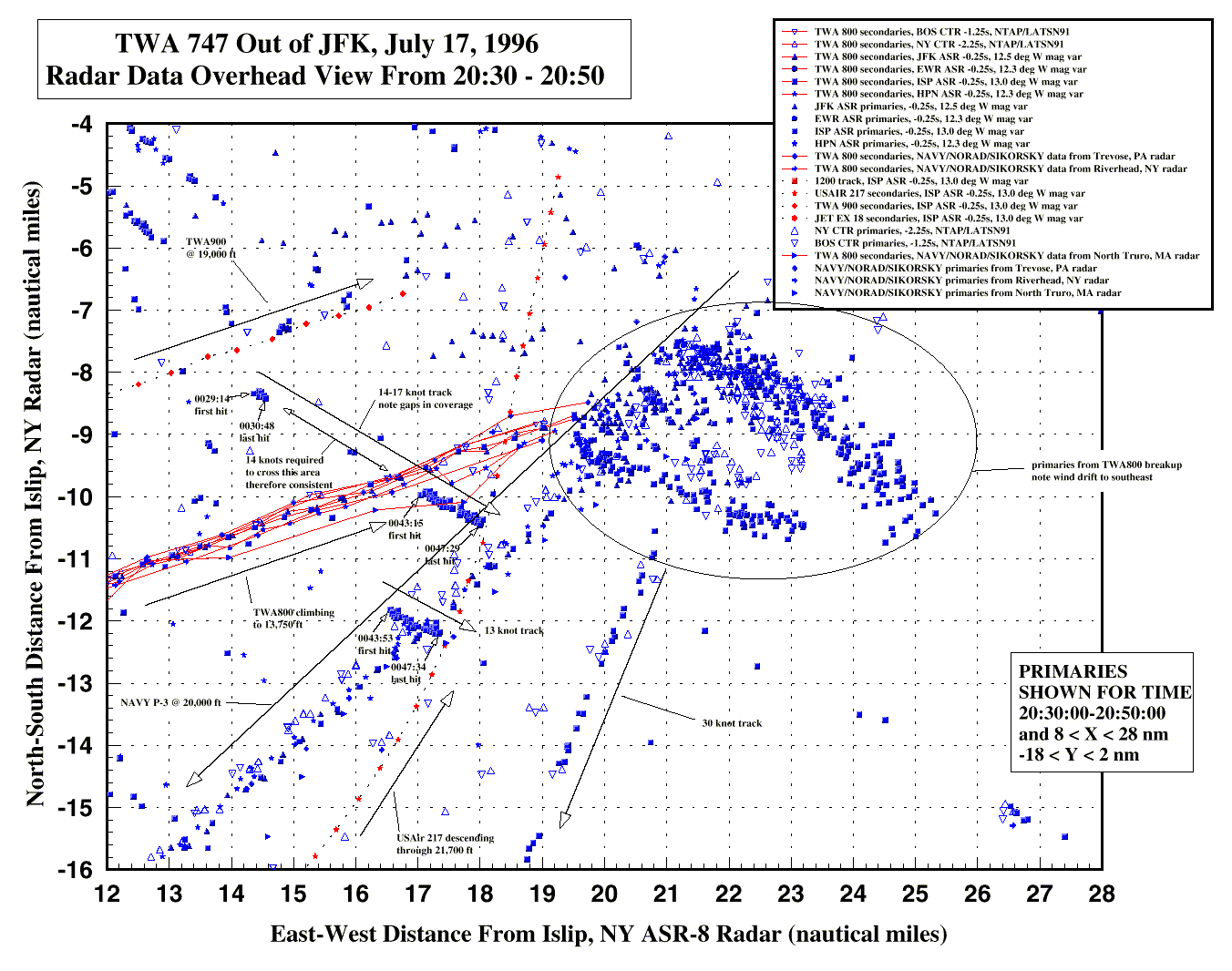
Primary radar returns that appeared near the TWA 800 after 8:31:12 p.m.: The 30-knot track is at the bottom center of the image.

Trace amounts of explosive residue were detected on three samples of material from three separate locations of the recovered airplane wreckage (described by the FBI as a piece of canvas-like material and two pieces of a floor panel). These samples were submitted to the FBI's laboratory in Washington, D.C., which determined that one sample contained traces of cyclotrimethylenetrinitramine (RDX), another nitroglycerin and the third a combination of RDX and pentaerythritol tetranitrate (PETN); these findings received much media attention. In addition, the backs of several damaged passenger seats were observed bearing an unknown red/brown-shaded substance. According to the seat manufacturer, the locations and appearance of the substance were consistent with adhesive used in the construction of the seats, and additional laboratory testing by NASA identified the substance as consistent with adhesives.

Further examination of the airplane structure, seats, and other interior components found no damage typically associated with a high-energy explosion of a bomb or missile warhead ("severe pitting, cratering, petalling or hot-gas washing"). This included the pieces on which trace amounts of explosives were found. Of the 5% of the fuselage that was not recovered, none of the missing areas was large enough to have covered all of the damage that would have been caused by the detonation of a bomb or missile. None of the victims' remains showed any evidence of injuries that could have been caused by high-energy explosives.

The NTSB considered the possibility that the explosive residue was the result of contamination from the aircraft's use in transporting troops during the Gulf War in 1991 or its use in a dog-training explosive-detection exercise about one month before the accident. Testing conducted by the FAA's Technical Center indicated that residues of the type of explosives found on the wreckage would dissipate completely after two days of immersion in seawater (nearly all recovered wreckage was immersed longer than two days). The NTSB concluded that it was "quite possible" that the explosive residue detected was transferred from military ships, ground vehicles, or the clothing and boots of military personnel onto the wreckage during or after the recovery operation, and that the residue was not present when the aircraft crashed into the water.

Although it was unable to determine the exact source of the trace amounts of explosive residue found in the wreckage, the lack of any other corroborating evidence associated with a high-energy explosion led the NTSB to conclude that "the in-flight breakup of TWA flight 800 was not initiated by a bomb or missile strike."

==== Fuel-air explosion in the center wing fuel tank ====
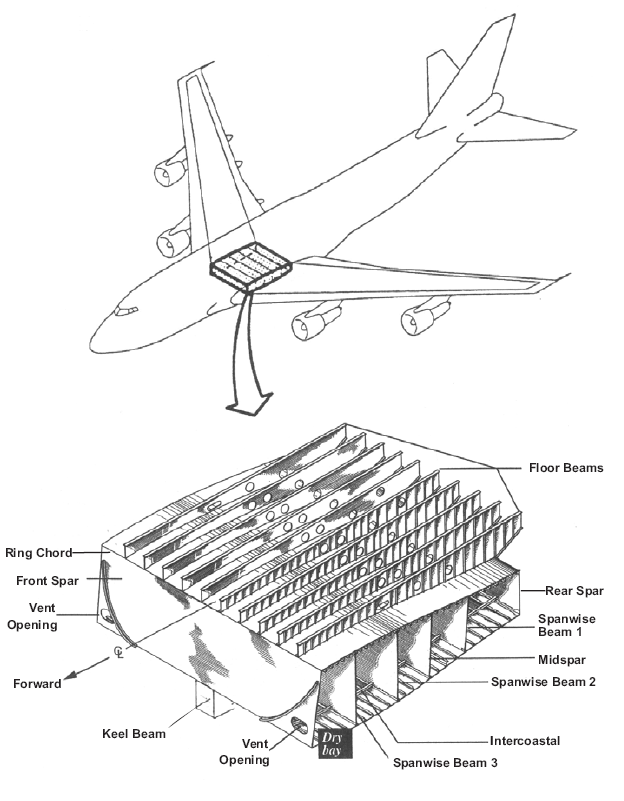
The wing center section of a Boeing 747-100, including the CWT

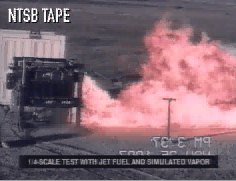
Scale-model test of a CWT fuel/air vapor explosion

To evaluate the sequence of structural breakup of the airplane, the NTSB formed the Sequencing Group, which examined individual pieces of the recovered structure, two-dimensional reconstructions or layouts of sections of the airplane and various-sized three-dimensional reconstructions of portions of the aircraft. In addition, the locations of pieces of wreckage at the time of recovery and differences in fire effects on pieces that are normally adjacent to each other were evaluated. The Sequencing Group concluded that the first event in the breakup sequence was a fracture in the wing center section of the aircraft caused by an "overpressure event" in the center-wing fuel tank (CWT). An overpressure event was defined as a rapid increase in pressure resulting in failure of the structure of the CWT.

Because no evidence was found that an explosive device detonated in this (or any other) area of the airplane, the overpressure event could only have been caused by a fuel-air explosion in the CWT. There were 50 US gal (190 L) of fuel in the CWT of TWA 800; tests recreating the flight conditions showed the combination of liquid fuel and fuel-air vapor to be flammable. A major reason for the flammability of the fuel-air vapor in the CWT of the 747 was the large amount of heat generated and transferred to the CWT by air-conditioning packs located directly below the tank; with the CWT temperature raised to a sufficient level, a single ignition source could cause an explosion.

Computer modeling and scale-model testing were used to predict and demonstrate how an explosion would progress in a 747 CWT. During this time, quenching was identified as an issue, a phenomenon in which the explosion would extinguish itself as it passed through the complex structure of the CWT. Because the research data regarding quenching were limited, a complete understanding of quenching behavior was not possible, and the issue of quenching remained unresolved.

To better determine whether a fuel-air vapor explosion in the CWT would generate sufficient pressure to break apart the fuel tank and lead to the destruction of the airplane, tests were conducted in July and August 1997 using a retired Air France 747 at Bruntingthorpe Airfield, England. These tests simulated a fuel-air explosion in the CWT by igniting a propane-air mixture, which failed the tank structure from overpressure. While the NTSB acknowledged that the test conditions at Bruntingthorpe were not fully comparable to the conditions that existed on TWA 800, previous fuel explosions in the CWTs of commercial airliners such as those of Avianca Flight 203 and Philippine Airlines Flight 143 confirmed that a CWT explosion could break apart the fuel tank and lead to the destruction of an airplane.

Ultimately, based on "the accident airplane's breakup sequence; wreckage damage characteristics; scientific tests and research on fuels, fuel tank explosions, and the conditions in the CWT at the time of the accident; and analysis of witness information," the NTSB concluded that "the TWA flight 800 in-flight breakup was initiated by a fuel/air explosion in the CWT."

=== In-flight breakup sequence and crippled flight ===
Debris fields

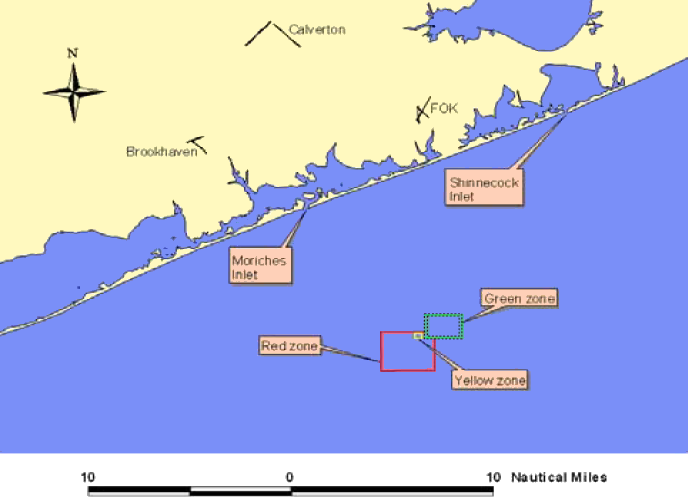
Map showing the locations of the red, yellow, and green zones

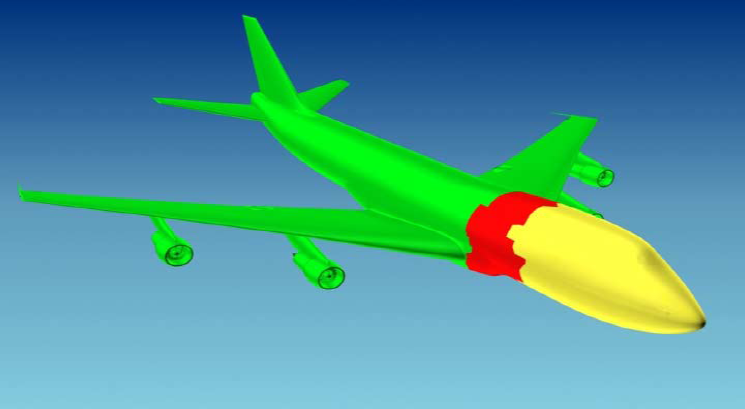
Wreckage found in each zone corresponded to specific areas of the aircraft

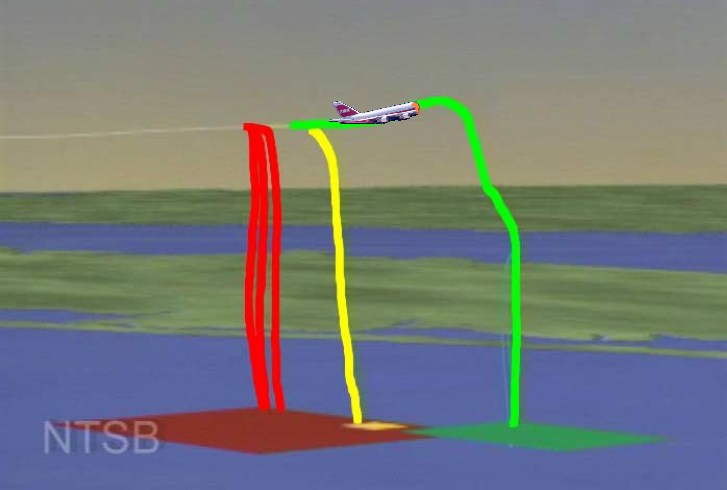
The pathways the wreckage took as it fell to the ocean

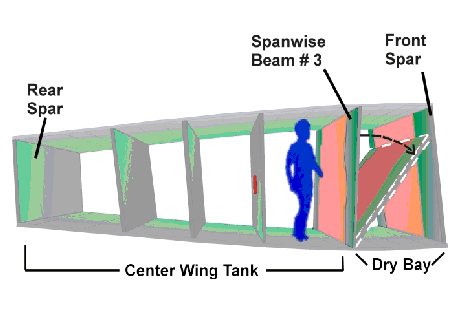
Slide from NTSB presentation of TWA 800 breakup sequence, illustrating structure and size of CWT

Recovery locations of the wreckage from the ocean (the red, yellow, and green zones) clearly indicated: (1) the red area pieces (from the forward portion of the wing center section and a ring of fuselage directly in front) were the earliest pieces to separate from the airplane; (2) the forward fuselage section departed simultaneously with or shortly after the red area pieces, landing relatively intact in the yellow zone; (3) the green area pieces (wings and the aft portion of the fuselage) remained intact for a period after the separation of the forward fuselage and impacted the water in the green zone.

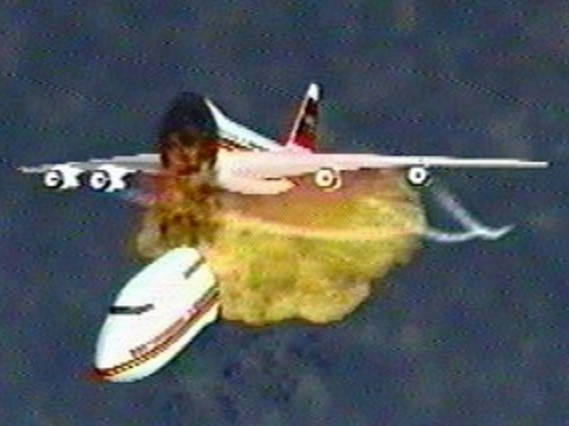
Frame from the CIA's animated depiction of how TWA Flight 800 broke apart: When the bottom of the aircraft blew out from the exploding fuel tank, cracks spread around the fuselage and severed the entire front section of the plane.

Fire damage and soot deposits on the recovered wreckage indicated that some areas of fire existed on the airplane as it continued in crippled flight after the loss of the forward fuselage. After about 34 seconds (based on information from witness documents), the outer portions of both the right and left wings failed. Shortly after, the left wing separated from what remained of the main fuselage, which resulted in further development of the fuel-fed fireballs as the pieces of wreckage fell to the ocean.

Only the FAA radar facility in North Truro, Massachusetts, using specialized processing software from the United States Air Force 84th Radar Evaluation Squadron, was capable of estimating the altitude of TWA 800 after it lost power due to the CWT explosion. Because of accuracy limitations, these radar data could not be used to determine whether the aircraft climbed after the nose separated. Instead, the NTSB conducted a series of computer simulations to examine the flightpath of the main portion of the fuselage. Hundreds of simulations were run using various combinations of possible times the nose of TWA 800 separated (the exact time was unknown), different models of the behavior of the crippled aircraft (the aerodynamic properties of the aircraft without its nose could only be estimated), and longitudinal radar data (the recorded radar tracks of the east/west position of TWA 800 from various sites differed). These simulations indicated that after the loss of the forward fuselage, the remainder of the aircraft continued in crippled flight, then pitched up while rolling to the left (north), climbing to a maximum altitude between 15,537 and 16,678 feet (4,736 and 5,083 m) from its last recorded altitude, 13,760 feet (4,190 m).

==== Analysis of reported witness observations ====
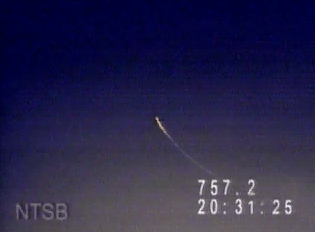
Most witness said they "saw a streak of light" in the sky and it was determined by the NTSB to be consistent with the calculated flightpath of TWA 800 after the CWT explosion (screenshot from an NTSB animation).

At the start of the FBI's investigation, because of the possibility that international terrorists might have been involved, assistance was requested from the Central Intelligence Agency (CIA). CIA analysts, relying on sound-propagation analysis, concluded that the witnesses could not be describing a missile approaching an intact aircraft, but were seeing a trail of burning fuel coming from the aircraft after the initial explosion. This conclusion was reached after calculating how long the sound of the initial explosion took to reach the witnesses, and using that to correlate the witness observations with the accident sequence. In all cases, the witnesses could not be describing a missile approaching an intact aircraft, as the plane had already exploded before their observations began.

As the investigation progressed, the NTSB decided to form a witness group to more fully address the accounts of witnesses. From November 1996 through April 1997, this group reviewed summaries of witness accounts on loan from the FBI (with personal information redacted) and conducted interviews with crewmembers from a New York Air National Guard HH-60 helicopter and C-130 airplane, as well as a U.S. Navy P-3 airplane that was flying in the vicinity of TWA 800 at the time of the accident.

In February 1998, the FBI, having closed its active investigation, agreed to fully release the witness summaries to the NTSB. With access to these documents no longer controlled by the FBI, the NTSB formed a second witness group to review the documents. Because of the time that had elapsed (about 21 months) before the NTSB received information about the identity of the witnesses, the witness group chose not to reinterview the witnesses, but instead to rely on the original summaries of witness statements written by FBI agents as the best available evidence of the observations initially reported by the witnesses. Despite the two and a half years that had elapsed since the accident, the witness group did interview the captain of Eastwind Airlines Flight 507, who was the first to report the explosion of TWA 800, because of his vantage point and experience as an airline pilot.

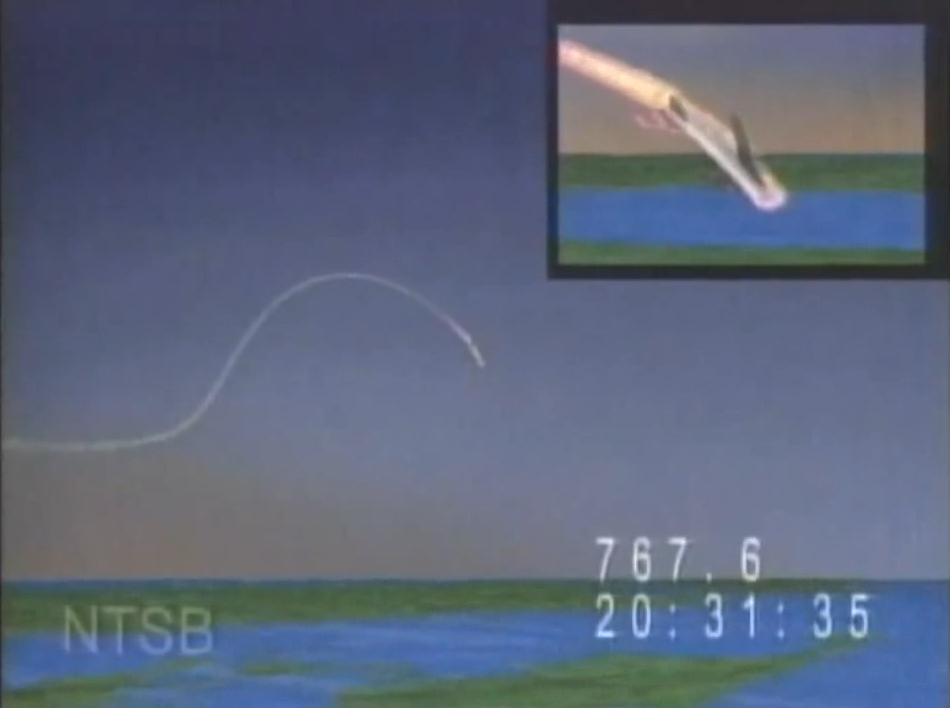
A frame from the NTSB's animation depicting how the noseless plane climbed erratically before descending into the ocean

The NTSB's review of the released witness documents determined that they contained 736 witness accounts, of which 258 were characterized as "streak of light" witnesses ("an object moving in the sky... variously described [as] a point of light, fireworks, a flare, a shooting star, or something similar.") The NTSB witness group concluded that the streak of light reported by witnesses might have been the actual airplane during some stage of its flight before the fireball developed, noting that most of the 258 streak-of-light accounts were generally consistent with the calculated flightpath of the accident airplane after the CWT explosion.

Thirty-eight witnesses described a streak of light that ascended vertically, or nearly so, and these accounts "seem[ed] to be inconsistent with the accident airplane's flightpath." In addition, 18 witnesses reported seeing a streak of light that originated at the surface, or the horizon, which did not "appear to be consistent with the airplane's calculated flightpath and other known aspects of the accident sequence." Regarding these differing accounts, the NTSB noted that based on their experience in previous investigations "witness reports are often inconsistent with the known facts or with other witnesses' reports of the same events." The interviews conducted by the FBI focused on the possibility of a missile attack; suggested interview questions given to FBI agents such as "Where was the sun in relation to the aircraft and the missile launch point?" and "How long did the missile fly?" could have biased interviewees' responses in some cases. The NTSB concluded that given the large number of witnesses in this case, they "did not expect all of the documented witness observations to be consistent with one another" and "did not view these apparently anomalous witness reports as persuasive evidence that some witnesses might have observed a missile".

After missile visibility tests were conducted in April 2000, at Eglin Air Force Base, Fort Walton Beach, Florida, the NTSB determined that if witnesses had observed a missile attack, they would have seen:

1. a light from the burning missile motor ascending very rapidly and steeply for about 8 seconds
2. the light disappearing for up to 7 seconds
3. upon the missile striking the aircraft and igniting the CWT, another light, moving considerably more slowly and more laterally than the first, for about 30 seconds
4. this light descending while simultaneously developing into a fireball falling toward the ocean. None of the witness documents described such a scenario.

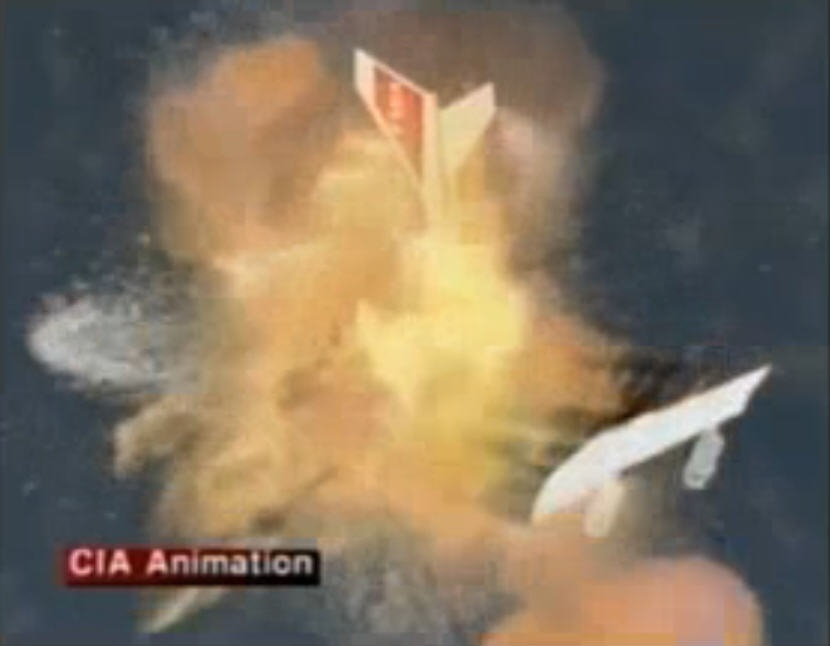
Another frame from the CIA's animation depicting how the left wing of TWA Flight 800 was shorn off and created a second fireball

Because of their unique vantage points or the level of precision and detail provided in their accounts, five witness accounts generated special interest: the pilot of Eastwind Airlines Flight 507, the crew members in the HH-60 helicopter, a streak-of-light witness aboard US Airways Flight 217, a land witness on the Beach Lane Bridge in Westhampton Beach, New York and a witness on a boat near Great Gun Beach. Advocates of a missile-attack scenario asserted that some of these witnesses observed a missile; analysis demonstrated that the observations were not consistent with a missile attack on TWA 800, but instead were consistent with these witnesses having observed part of the in-flight fire and breakup sequence after the CWT explosion.

The NTSB concluded, "the witness observations of a streak of light were not related to a missile and that the streak of light reported by most of these witnesses was burning fuel from the accident airplane in crippled flight during some portion of the postexplosion, preimpact breakup sequence". The NTSB further concluded, "the witnesses' observations of one or more fireballs were of the airplane's burning wreckage falling toward the ocean".

=== Possible ignition sources of the center wing fuel tank ===
To determine what ignited the flammable fuel-air vapor in the CWT and caused the explosion, the NTSB evaluated numerous potential ignition sources. All but one were considered very unlikely to have been the source of ignition.

==== Missile fragment or small explosive charge ====
Although the NTSB had already concluded that a missile strike did not cause the structural failure of the airplane, the possibility that a missile could have exploded close enough to TWA 800 for a missile fragment to have entered the CWT and ignited the fuel/air vapor, yet far enough away not to have left any damage characteristic of a missile strike, was considered. Computer simulations using missile performance data simulated a missile detonating in a location such that a fragment from the warhead could penetrate the CWT. Based on these simulations, the NTSB concluded that it was "very unlikely" that a warhead could have detonated in such a location where a fragment could penetrate the CWT without other missile fragments impacting the surrounding airplane structure, leaving distinctive impact marks.

Similarly, the investigation considered the possibility that a small explosive charge placed on the CWT could have been the ignition source. Testing by the NTSB and the British Defence Evaluation and Research Agency demonstrated that when the metal of the same type and thickness of the CWT was penetrated by a small charge, petalling of the surface occurred where the charge was placed, with pitting on the adjacent surfaces and visible hot-gas washing damage in the surrounding area. Since none of the recovered CWT wreckage exhibited these damage characteristics and none of the areas of missing wreckage was large enough to encompass all the expected damage, the investigation concluded that this scenario was "very unlikely".

==== Other potential sources ====
The NTSB also investigated whether the fuel-air mixture in the CWT could have been ignited by lightning strike, meteor strike, auto ignition or hot surface ignition, a fire migrating to the CWT from another fuel tank via the vent system, an uncontained engine failure, a turbine burst in the air conditioning packs beneath the CWT, a malfunctioning CWT jettison/override pump, a malfunctioning CWT scavenger pump, or static electricity. After analysis, the investigation determined that these potential sources were "very unlikely" to have been the source of ignition.

==== Fuel quantity indication system ====
Because a combustible fuel-air mixture will always exist in fuel tanks, Boeing designers attempted to eliminate all possible sources of ignition in the 747's tanks. To do so, all devices are protected from vapor intrusion, and voltages and currents used by the fuel quantity indication system (FQIS) are kept very low. In the case of the 747-100 series, the only wiring located inside the CWT is that associated with the FQIS.

For the FQIS to have been Flight 800's ignition source, a transfer of higher-than-normal voltage to the FQIS would have needed to occur, as well as some mechanism whereby the excess energy was released by the FQIS wiring into the CWT. The NTSB concluded, "the ignition energy for the CWT explosion most likely entered the CWT through the FQIS wiring."

Though the FQIS itself was designed to prevent danger by minimizing voltages and currents, the innermost tube of Flight 800's FQIS compensator showed damage similar to that of the compensator tube identified as the ignition source for the surge tank fire that destroyed a 747 near Madrid in 1976. This was not considered proof of a source of ignition. Evidence of arcing was found in a wire bundle that included FQIS wiring connecting to the center wing tank. Arcing signs were also seen on two wires sharing a cable raceway with FQIS wiring at station 955.

The captain's CVR channel showed two "dropouts" of background power harmonics in the second before the recording ended (with the separation of the nose). This may have been the signature of an arc on cockpit wiring adjacent to the FQIS wiring. The captain commented on the "crazy" readings of the number 4 engine fuel flow gauge about 2 1/2 minutes before the CVR recording ended. Finally, the CWT fuel quantity gauge was recovered and indicated 640 pounds instead of the 300 pounds that had been loaded into that tank. Experiments showed that applying power to a wire leading to the fuel quantity gauge can cause the digital display to change by several hundred pounds before the circuit breaker trips. Thus, the gauge anomaly could have been caused by a short circuit to the FQIS wiring. The NTSB concluded that the most likely source of sufficient voltage to cause ignition was a short circuit from damaged wiring, or within electrical components of the FQIS. As not all components and wiring were recovered, pinpointing the source of the necessary voltage was not possible.

== Report conclusions ==
The NTSB investigation ended with the adoption of the board's final report on August 23, 2000. The board determined that the probable cause of the TWA 800 accident was:

[An] explosion of the center wing fuel tank (CWT), resulting from ignition of the flammable fuel/air mixture in the tank. The source of ignition energy for the explosion could not be determined with certainty, but, of the sources evaluated by the investigation, the most likely was a short circuit outside of the CWT that allowed excessive voltage to enter it through electrical wiring associated with the fuel quantity indication system.

In addition to the probable cause, the NTSB found the following contributing factors to the accident:

- The design and certification concept that fuel tank explosions could be prevented solely by precluding all ignition sources.
- The certification of the Boeing 747 with heat sources located beneath the CWT with no means to reduce the heat transferred into the CWT or to render the fuel tank vapor noncombustible

During the course of its investigation, and in its final report, the NTSB issued 15 safety recommendations, mostly covering fuel tank and wiring-related issues. Among the recommendations was that significant consideration should be given to the development of modifications such as nitrogen-inerting systems for new airplane designs, and where feasible, for existing airplanes.

=== Controversy ===
After the accident, former Joint Chief of Staff Thomas Moorer and former White House Press Secretary Pierre Salinger speculated that the airplane was destroyed by a missile, with a nearby U.S. Navy ship being the likely culprit. The NTSB's conclusions about the cause of the TWA 800 disaster took four years and one month to be published. The FBI's earliest investigations and interviews, later used by the NTSB, were performed under the assumption of a missile attack, a fact noted in the NTSB's final report. Six months into the investigation, the NTSB's chairman, Jim Hall, was quoted as saying, "All three theories—a bomb, a missile, or mechanical failure—remain." Speculation was fueled in part by early descriptions, visuals, and eyewitness accounts of the disaster that indicated a sudden explosion and trails of fire moving in an upward direction.

On June 19, 2013, the NTSB acknowledged in a press release that they received a petition for reconsideration of the investigation into the July 17, 1996, crash of TWA Flight 800. In 2014, the NTSB declined the petition to reopen the investigation. In a press release, the NTSB stated: "After a thorough review of all the information provided by the petitioners, the NTSB denied the petition in its entirety because the evidence and analysis presented did not show the original findings were incorrect."

== Aftermath ==
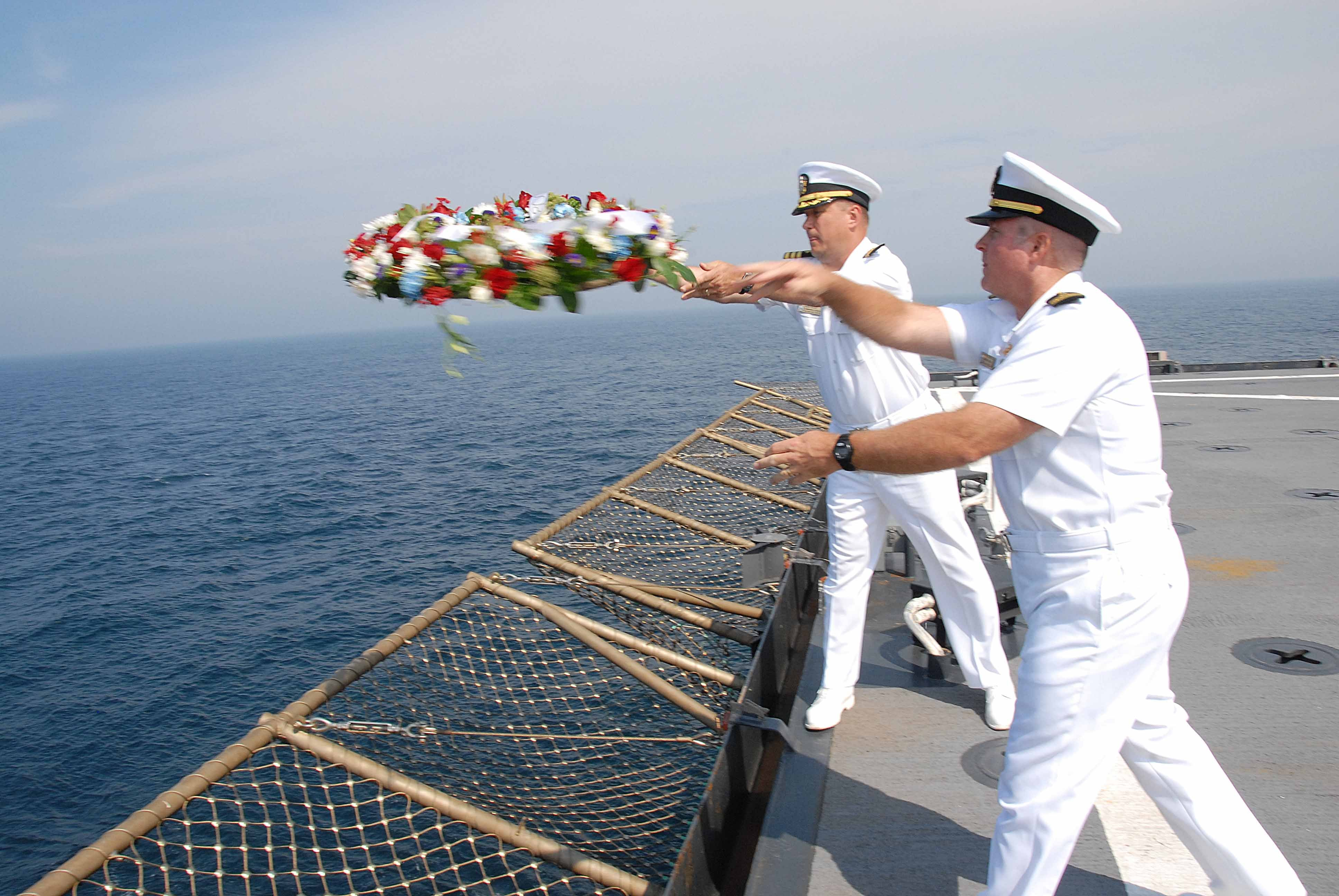
A wreath is cast into the Atlantic Ocean after a ceremony to honor the deaths of the occupants.

Many Internet users responded to the incident; the resulting Web traffic set records for Internet activity at the time. CNN's traffic quadrupled to 3.9 million views per day. The Web site of The New York Times had its traffic increase to 1.5 million views per day, 50% higher than its previous rate. In 1996, few U.S. government Web sites were updated daily, but the United States Navy's crash Web site was constantly updated and had detailed information about the salvage of the crash site.

The wreckage was moved to a purpose-built NTSB facility in Ashburn, Virginia. The reconstructed aircraft was used to train accident investigators until it was decommissioned in 2021.

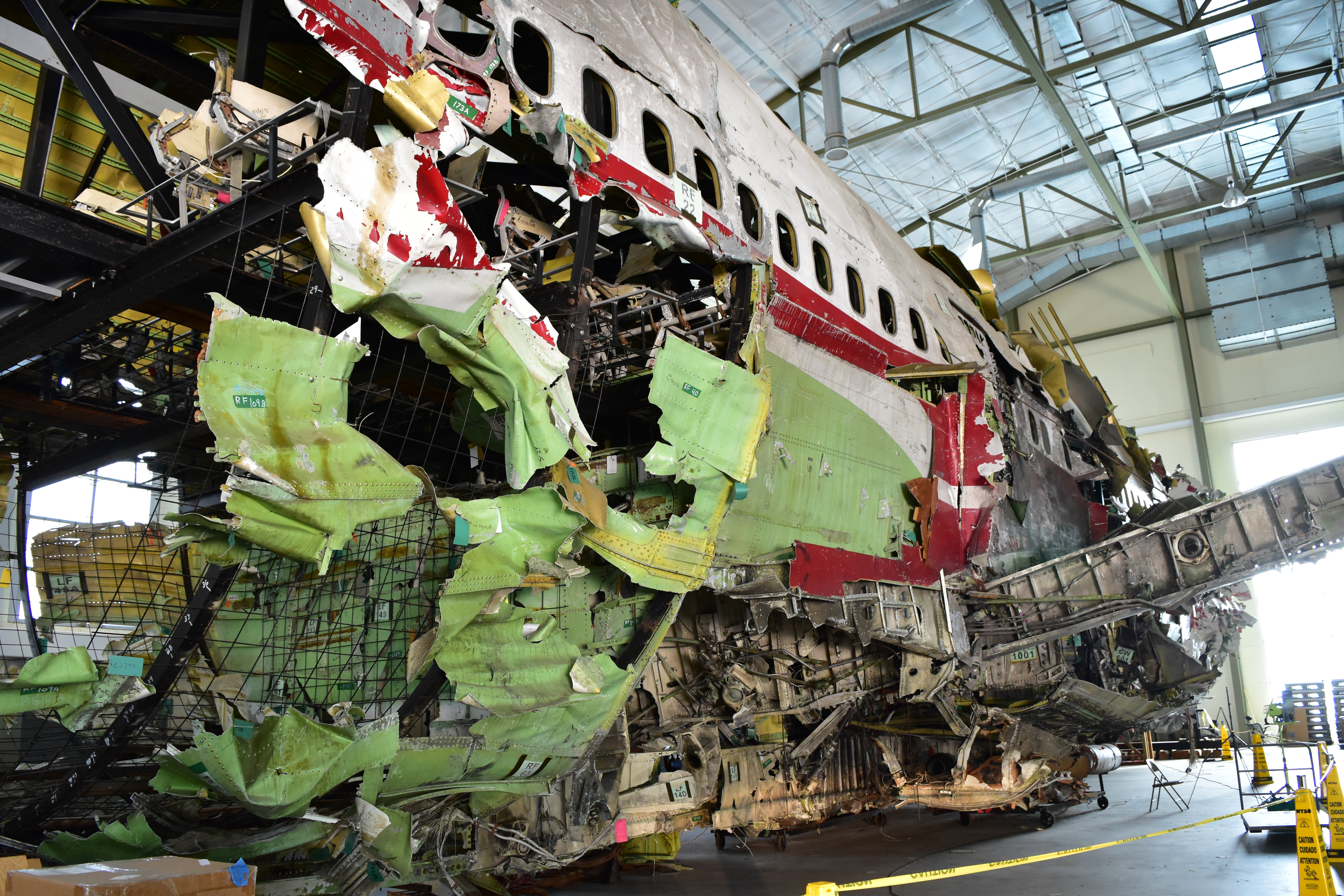
The reconstruction of N93119 used as a training aid in NTSB's Training Center in Ashburn, Virginia

In 2008, the Department of Transportation issued a final rule designed to prevent accidents caused by fuel-tank explosions. The rule required airlines to pump inert gas into the tanks. The rule covered the CWT on all new passenger and cargo airliners, and passenger planes built in most of the 1990s, but not on old cargo planes. The NTSB had first recommended such a rule just five months after the incident and 33 years after a similar recommendation issued by the Civil Aeronautics Board Bureau of Safety on December 17, 1963, nine days after the crash of Pan Am Flight 214.

The crash of TWA Flight 800, and that of ValuJet Flight 592 earlier in 1996, prompted Congress to pass the Aviation Disaster Family Assistance Act of 1996 as part of the federal aviation appropriations bill. Among other things, the act gives NTSB, instead of the particular airline involved, responsibility for coordinating services to the families of victims of fatal aircraft accidents in the United States. In addition, it restricts lawyers and other parties from contacting family members within 30 days of the accident.

During the investigation, the NTSB and the FBI clashed with each other. The agencies lacked a detailed protocol describing which agency should take the lead when it was initially unclear whether an event was an accident or a criminal act. At the time of the crash, 49 CFR 831.5 specified that the NTSB's aviation accident investigations have priority over all other federal investigations. After the TWA flight 800 investigation, the NTSB recognized the need for better clarity. The NTSB sought and secured language to clarify the issue in 49 USC 1131(a)(2)(B), which was amended in 2000 to read:

If the Attorney General, in consultation with the Chairman of the [NTSB], determines and notifies the [NTSB] that circumstances reasonably indicate that the accident may have been caused by an intentional criminal act, the [NTSB] shall relinquish investigative priority to the [FBI]. The relinquishment of investigative priority by the [NTSB] shall not otherwise affect the authority of the [NTSB] to continue its investigation under this section

— 49 USC 1131(a)(2)(B)

In 2005, the NTSB and the FBI entered into a memorandum of understanding (MOU) that stated that, "[i]n the immediate aftermath of a transportation accident, the NTSB is the presumptive lead investigative agency and will assume control of the accident scene." The FBI may still conduct a criminal investigation, but the NTSB investigation has priority. When investigative priority remains with the NTSB, the FBI must coordinate its investigative activities with the NTSB investigator-in-charge. This authority includes interviewing witnesses. The MOU states that: "[t]his procedure is intended...to ensure that neither NTSB nor FBI investigative activity unnecessarily complicates or compromises the other agency's investigation." The new statutory language and the MOU have improved coordination between the NTSB and FBI since the TWA Flight 800 accident. As of 2005, NTSB and FBI personnel conduct joint exercises. Each agency can call upon the other's laboratories and other assets. The NTSB and the FBI have designated liaisons to ensure that information flows between agencies and to coordinate on-scene operations.

Heidi Snow, the fiancée of Flight 800 victim Michel Breistroff, established the AirCraft Casualty Emotional Support Services nonprofit group together with families of victims of Pan Am Flight 103.

=== Memorials ===
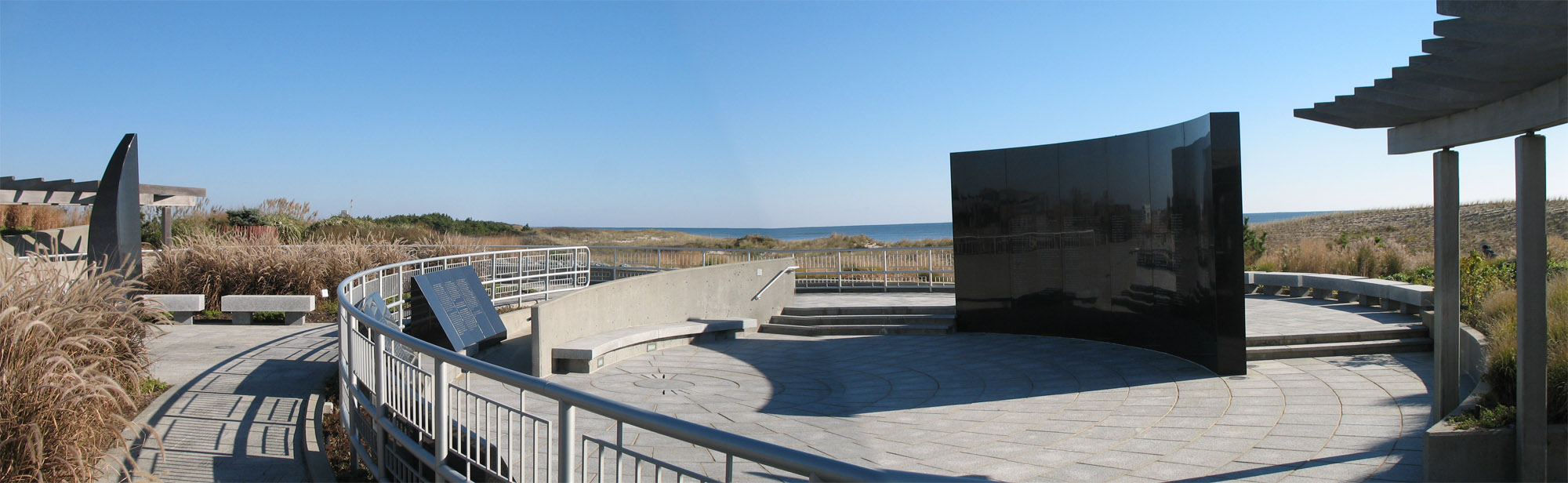
TWA Memorial

The TWA Flight 800 International Memorial was dedicated in a 2-acre (8,100 m^{2}) parcel immediately adjoining the main pavilion at Smith Point County Park in Shirley, New York, on July 14, 2002. Funds for the memorial were raised by the Families of TWA Flight 800 Association. The memorial includes landscaped grounds, flags from the 13 countries of the victims, and a curved black granite memorial with the names engraved on one side and an illustration on the other of a wave releasing 230 seagulls. In July 2006, an abstract black granite statue of a 10-foot-high (3.0 m) lighthouse was added above a tomb holding many of the victims' personal belongings. The lighthouse statue was designed by Harry Edward Seaman, whose cousin died in the crash, and dedicated by New York Governor George Pataki.

Behind the Montoursville Area High School there is a memorial garden honoring the 21 lives lost from the school.

=== Destruction of wreckage ===
For almost 25 years, the wreckage of Flight 800 was kept by the NTSB and used as an accident-investigation teaching aid. By 2021, the methods taught using the wreckage were determined to no longer be relevant to modern accident investigation, which by then relied heavily on new technology, including three-dimensional laser-scanning techniques.

As the NTSB did not wish to renew the lease for the hangar in which it had stored the reassembled accident debris, it decommissioned the wreckage in July 2021. As the NTSB had agreements with the victims' families that the wreckage could not be used in any kind of public exhibit or be scuttled in the ocean, it planned to scan each piece of debris with a three-dimensional laser scanner, with the data being permanently archived, after which the wreckage would be destroyed and the metal recycled. Any parts of the plane that could not be recycled would be disposed of in landfills. Destruction of the wreckage was scheduled for completion before the end of 2021. The wreckage was destroyed in June 2023 near the former Ashburn facility in which it was housed.

== Dramatization ==
The incident was reenacted in a season 17 episode of Mayday, titled "Explosive Proof", as well as a season 2 episode of Seconds from Disaster.

On July 17, 2013, the 17th anniversary of the tragedy, the Epix premium TV channel aired the documentary TWA Flight 800, directed by Kristina Borjesson, which alleges that the crash investigation was a cover-up. The film highlights extensive eyewitness interviews, with many interviewees directly objecting to publicly described versions of their own descriptions of events. It also highlights interviews with investigators who had been involved in the original inquest, six of whom had filed a petition to reopen the probe. Their petition was based on eyewitness accounts, radar evidence indicating a possible missile and claims of evidence tampering. They dubbed it "The TWA 800 Project". Former NTSB investigator Henry Hughes has been quoted that he believes a bomb or a missile caused the crash.

Movie critic Roger Ebert noted that the crash of fictional Volée Airlines Flight 180 from the first (2000) and fifth (2011) Final Destination films mirrors the loss of TWA Flight 800. According to the creator of the Final Destination franchise, Jeffrey Reddick, the script for the first film was written in 1994, two years before the Flight 800 crash. Despite this, the first film did reuse real-life news coverage of TWA Flight 800 as if it were coverage of the Flight 180 crash—a decision that Reddick later said he "wasn't particularly happy about".

== See also ==
- List of accidents and incidents involving the Boeing 747
- Louis Freeh – director of the FBI from 1993 to 2001 who assisted in the crash investigation
- Night Fall – 2004 New York Times bestseller by novelist Nelson DeMille that revolves around a couple who witnessed and videotaped the crash of TWA Flight 800
- Pan Am Flight 214 – an aircraft that suffered a fuel-tank explosion in midair in 1963 after being hit by lightning
- Philippine Airlines Flight 143 – a similar incident in 1990 involving a 737 that experienced a fuel-tank explosion on the ground, possibly caused by faulty wiring
- Thai Airways International Flight 114 – a similar incident in 2001 involving a 737 that experienced a fuel-tank explosion on the ground, possibly as a result of running the pump in the presence of metal shavings and a fuel/air mixture
- South African Airways Flight 295 – another Boeing 747 crash that gave rise to conspiracy theories
