= AirCraft Casualty Emotional Support Services =

- Abbreviation: ACCESS
- Formation: 1996
- Founder: Gail Weinstein & other family members
- Type: Nonprofit organization
- Legal status: 501(c)(3) organization
- Purpose: Emotional support and assistance to families who have lost loved ones in aircraft-related accidents
- Headquarters: New York, United States
- Region served: International
- Website: www.accesshelp.org

AirCraft Casualty Emotional Support Services ("ACCESS") is an American nonprofit support group based in New York City that helps surviving family members of aircraft crash victims.

== History ==
The organization was created by Heidi Snow, then fiancee of French hockey player Michel Breistroff, who died in the TWA Flight 800 disaster. The American Red Cross provided services for two weeks, after which survivors were left to arrange support on their own. Snow contacted Rudolph Giuliani, then Mayor of New York City, who in turn suggested that she contact families of victims of an earlier crash, Pan Am Flight 103. After organizing the nonprofit, she arranged meetings between these families and those of victims of other major aviation disasters, including 9/11. The nonprofit also conducts sensitivity and support training for airlines and other companies that regularly deal with bereaving families and survivors.
