= Aircraft fuel tank =

Aircraft component

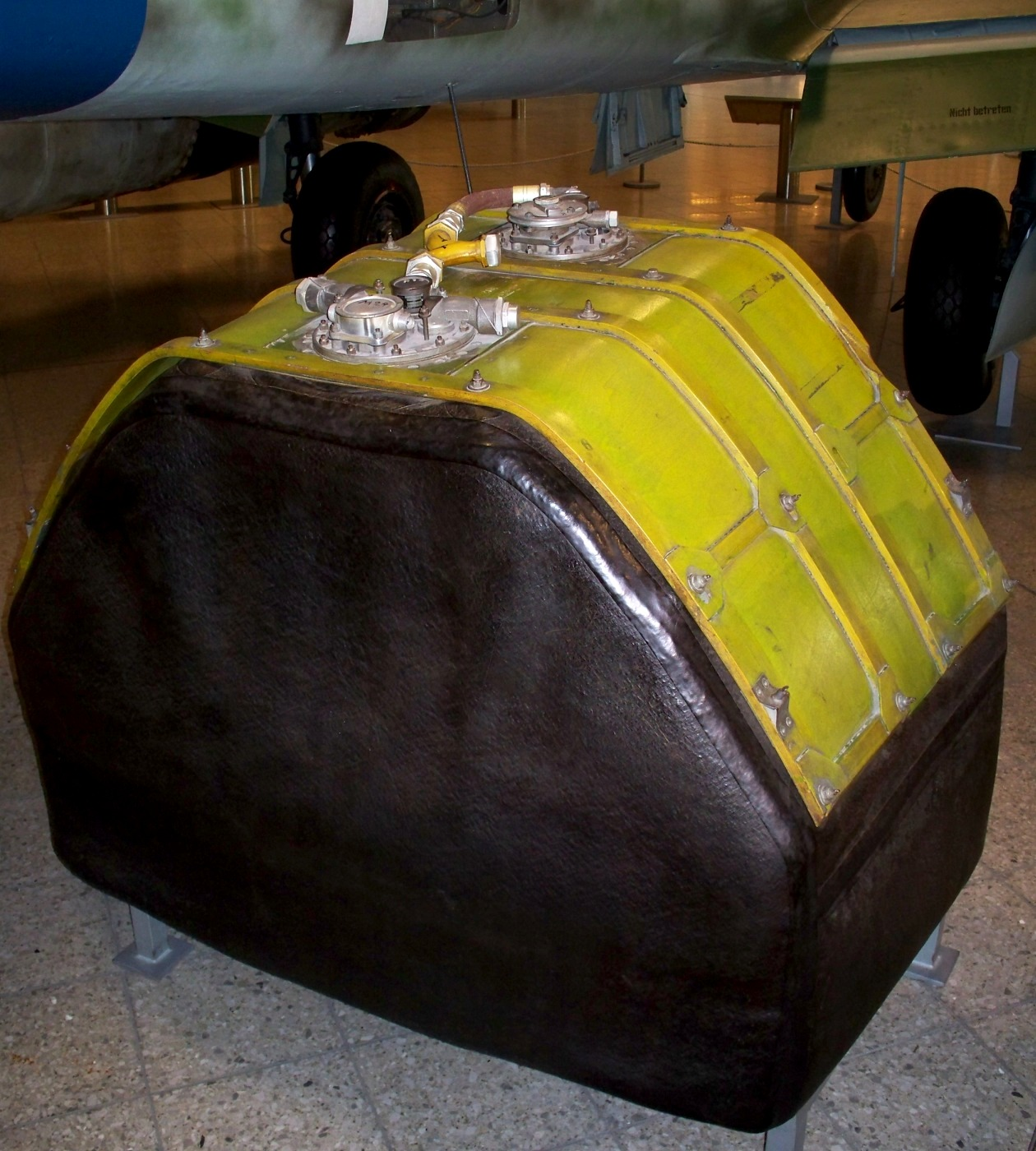
Self-sealing fuel tank of a Messerschmitt Me 262 on display at the Deutsches Museum, Munich

Aircraft fuel tanks are a major component of aircraft fuel systems. They can be classified into internal or external fuel tanks and can be further classified by method of construction or intended use. Safety aspects of aircraft fuel tanks were examined during the investigation of the 1996 TWA Flight 800 in-flight explosion accident.

== Internal tanks ==
=== Integral tanks ===
Integral tanks are areas inside the aircraft structure that have been sealed to allow fuel storage. An example of this type is the "wet wing", commonly used in larger aircraft. Since these tanks are part of the aircraft structure, they cannot be removed for service or inspection. Inspection panels must be provided to allow internal inspection, repair, and overall servicing of the tank. Most large transport aircraft use this system to store fuel in the wings, fuselage and empennage of the aircraft.

=== Rigid removable tanks ===
Rigid removable tanks are installed in a compartment designed to accommodate the tank. They are typically made of metal, plastic or fibreglass construction, and may be removed for inspection, replacement, or repair. Rigid removable tanks are not relied on for the aircraft's structural integrity. These tanks are commonly found in smaller general aviation aircraft, such as the Cessna 172. Combat aircraft and helicopters generally use self-sealing fuel tanks.

=== Bladder tanks ===
Bladder tanks, bag tanks or fuel cells, are reinforced rubberised bags installed in a section of aircraft structure designed to accommodate fuel. The bladder is rolled up and installed into the compartment through the fuel filler neck or access panel, and is secured by means of snap fasteners or cord and loops inside the compartment. Many high-performance light aircraft, helicopters and some smaller turboprop aircraft use bladder tanks.

=== Tip tanks ===
Many aircraft designs feature fixed tip tanks mounted at the end of each wing. The weight of the tanks and fuel counteract wing bending loads during manoeuvres and reduce fatigue on the spar structure.

== External tanks ==
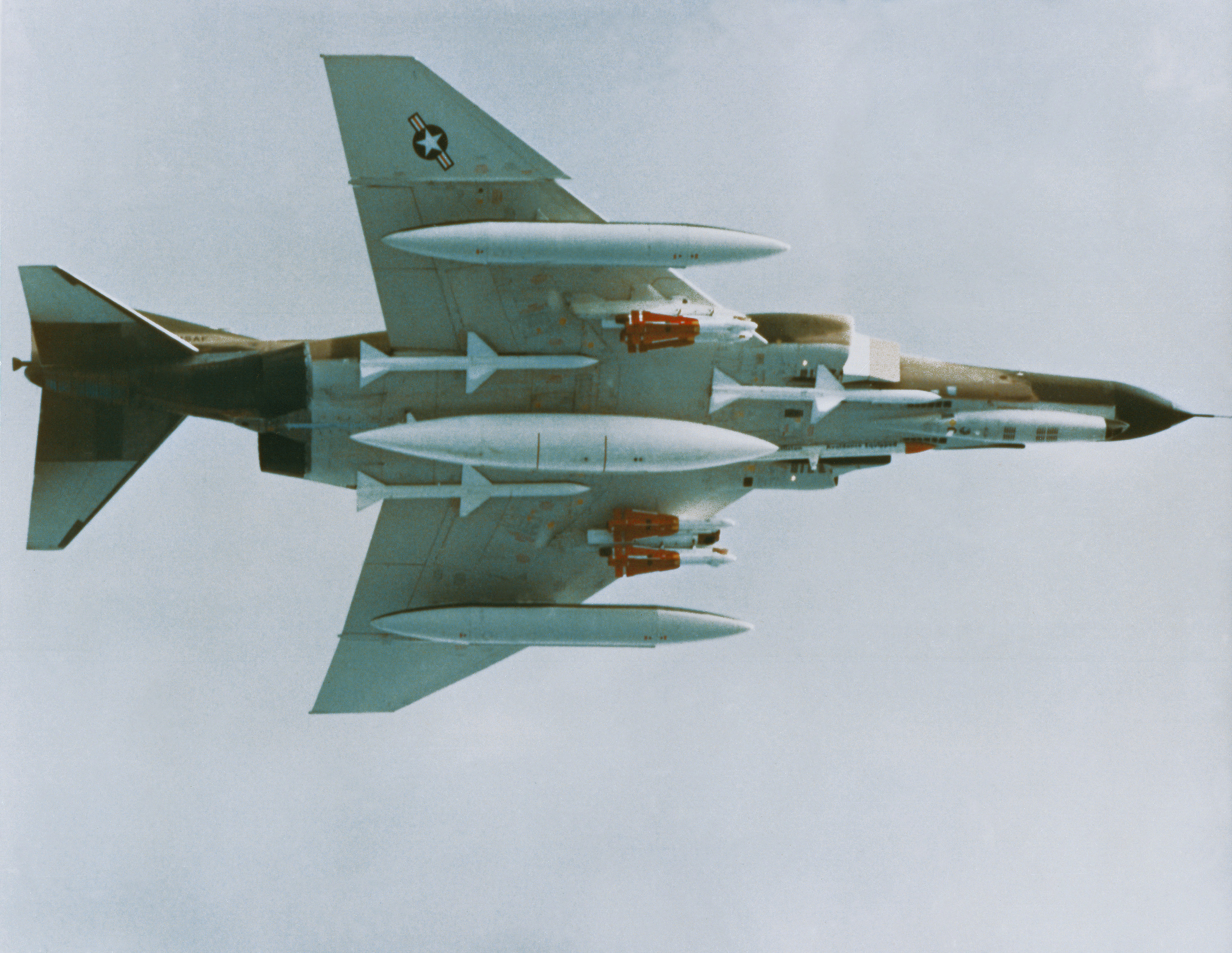
F-4E Phantom carrying two underwing pylon tanks and a centreline tank

=== Conformal fuel tank ===
Conformal fuel tanks (CFTs) or "fast packs" are additional fuel tanks fitted closely to the profile of an aircraft which extend either the range or endurance of the aircraft, with a reduced aerodynamic penalty compared to external drop tanks.

=== Drop tank ===
Drop tanks, external tanks, wing tanks, pylon tanks or belly tanks are all terms used to describe auxiliary externally mounted fuel tanks. Drop tanks are generally expendable and often jettisonable. External tanks are commonplace on modern military aircraft and occasionally found in civilian ones, although the latter are less likely to be discarded except in the event of emergency.

Drop tanks were originally designed to be jettisoned when empty or in the event of combat or emergency in order to reduce drag and weight, increasing manoeuvrability and range. Modern external tanks may be retained in combat, to be dropped in an emergency and are often not designed for the stresses of supersonic flight.

== Safety ==
Fuel tanks have been implicated in aviation disasters, being the cause of the accident or worsening it (fuel tank explosion).

The National Transportation Safety Board concluded that explosion and subsequent crash of TWA Flight 800 was the result of an explosive fuel/air mixture was created in one of the aircraft's fuel tanks. Faulty wiring then provided an ignition source within the tank, destroying the airliner. Similar explosions have occurred in other aircraft. It is possible to reduce the chance of fuel tank explosions by a fuel tank inerting system or fire fighting foam in the tanks.

The Boeing 737, for example, has two systems that reduce the chance of a fuel tank ignition. One shuts off fuel pumps when fuel output pressure is low, to prevent them from heating (since they rely on the fuel itself for cooling). The other enriches the nitrogen levels in the air in the fuel tank, so there is insufficient oxygen there for burning. The aircraft engines are also capable of getting fuel via suction in the result of a failure in the backup pumps, though this produces less reliable thrust.

== Placement ==
On passenger planes, fuel tanks are often integrated into the wings, and when there are also tanks inside the body of the aircraft, the wing tanks are used preferentially. The placement reduces the stress on the wings during takeoff and flight, by putting the heavy fuel directly inside the source of lift. Putting tanks in the main wings rather than near the tail or nose also reduces the amount of weight that is off-center from the plane's center of gravity, and which changes as it flies and which would make the aircraft less efficient by requiring increased use of elevators. Given their irregular shape and lack of windows, wings are often unusable for storage of cargo or seating of passengers. But their hollow structure makes in-wing fuel storage feasible and an efficient use of space; the presence of structural spars in "wet wing" tanks reduces sloshing. Placement of fuel tanks in the wings also moves them further from passengers and crew in the event of a leak or explosion.

== See also ==
- Aircraft fuel system
- Sargent Fletcher - Manufacturer of aircraft drop tanks
