= Michel Breistroff =

French ice hockey player

- Michel Breistroff, circa 1995
- Born: February 5, 1971 Roubaix, France
- Died: July 17, 1996 (aged 25) Long Island, New York, United States
- Height: 6 ft 0 in (183 cm)
- Weight: 189 lb (86 kg; 13 st 7 lb)
- Position: Defence
- Played for: Ducs d'Angers
- Playing career: 1995–1996

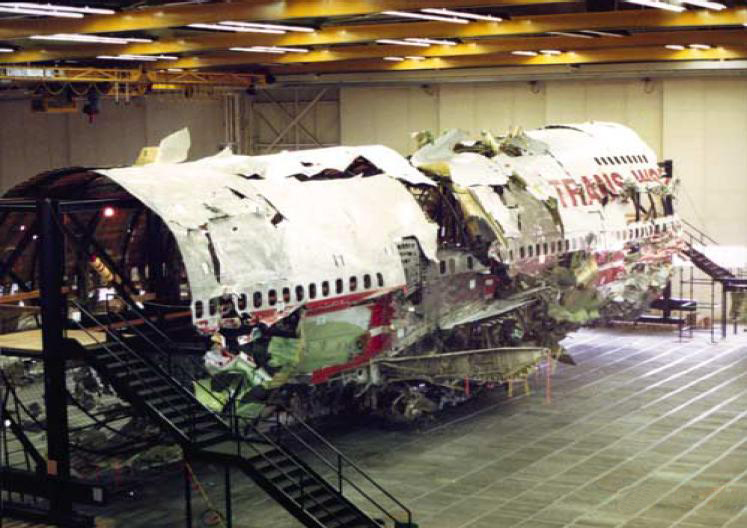
Breistroff died on N93119, the Boeing 747-131 used for TWA Flight 800

Michel Breistroff (February 5, 1971 – July 17, 1996) was a French professional ice hockey defenceman.

Breistroff was born in Roubaix, France. A graduate in anthropology from Harvard University, he died at 25 in the crash of TWA Flight 800 off Long Island, New York. He was playing professional ice hockey for French league team Gothiques d'Amiens at the time of his death. He also played with the France national team during the 1996 Men's World Ice Hockey Championships in Vienna.

As a passenger on TWA Flight 800, he was killed when the plane exploded shortly after takeoff in 1996. His then-fiancée, Heidi Snow, subsequently created AirCraft Casualty Emotional Support Services ("ACCESS"), an American nonprofit support group, based in New York City, which helps surviving family members of aircraft crash victims.

== Playing career ==
- 1990–1995 NCAA – Harvard University
- 1995–1996 French League – Ducs d'Angers
