= Tank blanketing =

Filling ullage with a protective gas

Tank blanketing, also called gas sealing or tank padding, is the process of applying a gas to the space above the liquid level in a storage container such as a tank. Tank blanketing is used for a variety of reasons, including protecting products quality by reducing oxidation, longer product life, reduced fire and explosion hazards, and longer equipment life cycles.

== Methods ==
The basic concept is to introduce the blanketing gas into the system, and to vent the gas should the pressure get too high. this is usually accomplished by automatic gas control valves with controls referenced to the tank pressure.

The vapor pressure inside the container can decrease if the liquid inside the container is removed (i.e., drained or pumped), or if the environmental temperature decreases resulting in a decrease in liquid and vapor temperature, or if the liquid is cooled by process or natural heat transfer from an initially hot liquid. If the vapor pressure drops below the pad valve set point, the pad valve opens and allows the blanketing gas to enter. Once the pressure reaches the set point, the pad valve closes.

The tank vapor pressure can increase if liquid is added, or if the environmental temperature increases resulting in an increase in liquid and vapor temperature, or if the liquid is heated by process or natural heat transfer to an initially cool liquid. If the vapor pressure increases above the de-pad valve set point, the de-pad valve opens and allows the vapor in the headspace to vent. Once the tank pressure drops below the de-pad valve set point, the de-pad valve closes.

Since most blanketing gas sources will provide gas at a much higher than desired pressure, a blanketing system will also use a pressure reducing valve to decrease the inlet pressure to the tank.

The vented gas is a combination of the blanketing gas and liquid vapor. Depending on the gas and vapor parameters (e.g., flammability, toxicity, reactiveness) the vented gas may be discharged to atmosphere, or may be recycled in a closed system.

The de-pad system is independent of the container over-pressure safety systems, such as normal and emergency vents, usually mandated by safety regulations.

Blanketing systems usually operate at a few inches of water column pressure above atmospheric pressure. Higher pressures than this are generally not used as they often yield only marginal increases in results while wasting large amounts of expensive blanketing gas.

Most gas blanketing systems discharge the blanketing gas directly into the container headspace above the liquid. Some systems introduce the blanketing gas below the liquid surface to agitate the liquid contents of the container as the bubbles rise to the headspace. This is desirable with non-miscible tank contents that will separate over time, with the heavier contents sinking to the bottom.

A system that utilizes nitrogen sparging can have a negative impact on the products involved. Nitrogen sparging creates a significantly higher amount of surface contact between the gas and the product, which in turn creates a much larger opportunity for undesired oxidation to occur if the blanketing gas contains oxygen. It is possible for nitrogen that is as much 99.9% free of oxygen to increase the amount of oxidation within the product due to the high amount of surface contact.

== Common practices ==
The most common gas used in blanketing is nitrogen. Nitrogen is widely used due to its inert properties, as well as its availability and relatively low cost. Tank blanketing is used for a variety of products including cooking oils, volatile combustible products, and purified water. These applications also cover a wide variety of storage containers, ranging from as large as a tank containing millions of gallons of vegetable oil down to a quart-size container or smaller. Nitrogen is appropriate for use at any of these scales.

The use of an inert blanketing gas for food products helps to keep oxygen levels low in and around the product. Low levels of oxygen surrounding the product help to reduce the amount of oxidation that may occur, and increases shelf life. In the case of cooking oils, lipid oxidation can cause the oil to change its color, flavor, or aroma. It also decreases the nutrient levels in the food and can even generate toxic substances. Tank blanketing strategies are also implemented to prepare the product for transit (railcar or truck) and for final packaging before sealing the product.

Tanks containing ignitable liquids are often provided with inert gas blanketing to reduce the oxygen content to prevent combustion.

Tank blanketing is also used to keep contaminants out of a storage space. This is accomplished by creating positive pressure inside the container. This positive pressure ensures that if a leak should occur, the gas will leak out rather than having the contaminants infiltrate the container. Some examples include its use on purified water to keep unwanted minerals out and its use on food products to keep contaminants out.

To ensure their safety, gas-blanketing systems for food use are regulated by the U.S. Food and Drug Administration (FDA) and must adhere to strict maintenance schedules and follow all product-contact regulations with regards to purity, toxicity, and filter specs. As with any use of inert gases, care must be taken to ensure that workers are not exposed to large quantities of nitrogen or other non-breathable substances, which can quickly result in asphyxiation and death. Use of them in commercial applications is subject to the regulation of OSHA in the USA and similar regulatory bodies elsewhere.

== See also ==
- Industrial gas
- Oxygen reduction system
- Inerting system

== External sources ==
- Online Chemical Engineering Information
- Nitrogen properties, uses, and applications
