= Philippine Airlines Flight 143 =

1990 aviation accident in the Philippines

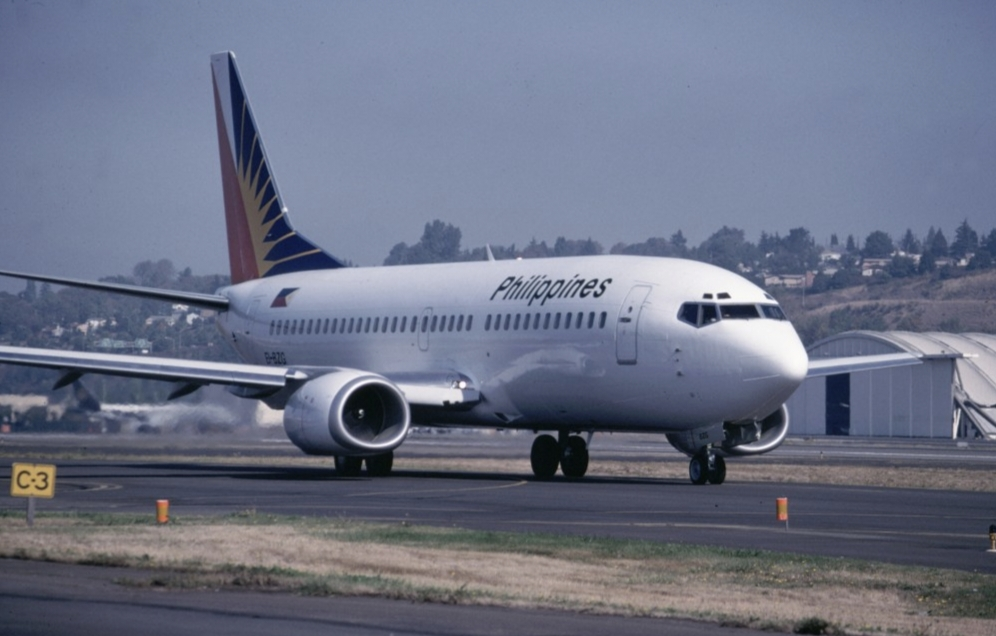
- EI-BZG, the aircraft involved in the accident, seen in 1989

Accident
- Date: May 11, 1990
- Summary: Fuel tank explosion while on ground
- Site: Manila Ninoy Aquino International Airport, Manila, Philippines; 14°30′31″N 121°01′10″E

Aircraft
- Aircraft type: Boeing 737-3Y0
- Operator: Philippine Airlines
- IATA flight No.: PR143
- ICAO flight No.: PAL143
- Call sign: PHILIPPINE 143
- Registration: EI-BZG
- Flight origin: Manila Ninoy Aquino International Airport, Manila, Philippines
- Destination: Iloilo Mandurriao Airport, Iloilo City, Philippines
- Occupants: 120
- Passengers: 114
- Crew: 6
- Fatalities: 8
- Injuries: 82
- Survivors: 112

Philippine Airlines Flight 143 (PR143) was a domestic flight from Manila Ninoy Aquino Airport, Manila, to Mandurriao Airport, Iloilo City, Philippines. On May 11, 1990, at Manila Ninoy Aquino International Airport the Boeing 737-300 assigned to the route suffered an explosion in the central fuel tank and was consumed by fire in as little as four minutes. This accident marked the first hull loss of a 737-300.

== Accident ==
The air temperature had been high at the time of the accident, about 35 °C (95 °F), while the Boeing 737-300 was parked at Manila. The air conditioning packs, located beneath the center wing fuel tank of the 737, had been running on the ground before pushback (approximately 30 to 45 minutes). The center wing fuel tank, which had not been filled in two months, likely contained some fuel vapors. Shortly after pushback a powerful explosion in the center fuel tank pushed the cabin floor violently upward. The wing tanks ruptured, causing the airplane to burst into flames.

The majority of the 112 survivors managed to escape via the emergency escape ropes and emergency exits.

== Probable cause ==
It is thought the vapors ignited due to damaged wiring, because no bomb, incendiary device, or detonator had been found at the scene. The airline had fitted logo lights after delivery which required passing additional wires through the vapor seals in the fuel tanks. The NTSB recommended to the FAA that an Airworthiness Directive be issued requiring inspections of the fuel boost pumps, float switch, and wiring looms because signs of chafing had been found. The FAA declined to issue the Airworthiness Directive.

The NTSB later determined the same causes had resulted in the crash of TWA Flight 800 on July 17, 1996, where all 230 passengers and crew on the Boeing 747 were killed in the accident. Ignition of the vapors within the center wing tank is also believed by the NTSB to be the cause behind the explosion of another Boeing 737 on March 3, 2001, which was operating as Thai Airways International Flight 114. Seven of the eight crew members aboard survived, the accident occurring before the boarding of passengers had taken place. The FAA did not mandate any changes to prevent center wing tank ignition aboard aircraft until July 2008, after which, the FAA required all passenger aircraft built after 1991 to implement or install preventative technology to avoid future center wing tank ignition, with a deadline set for 2010. The mandate also required all newly constructed aircraft to be fitted with the same equipment.

== See also ==
- TWA Flight 800
- Thai Airways International Flight 114
- Pan Am Flight 214
