= Chesterfield Township, New Jersey =

Township in Burlington County, New Jersey, US

- Township
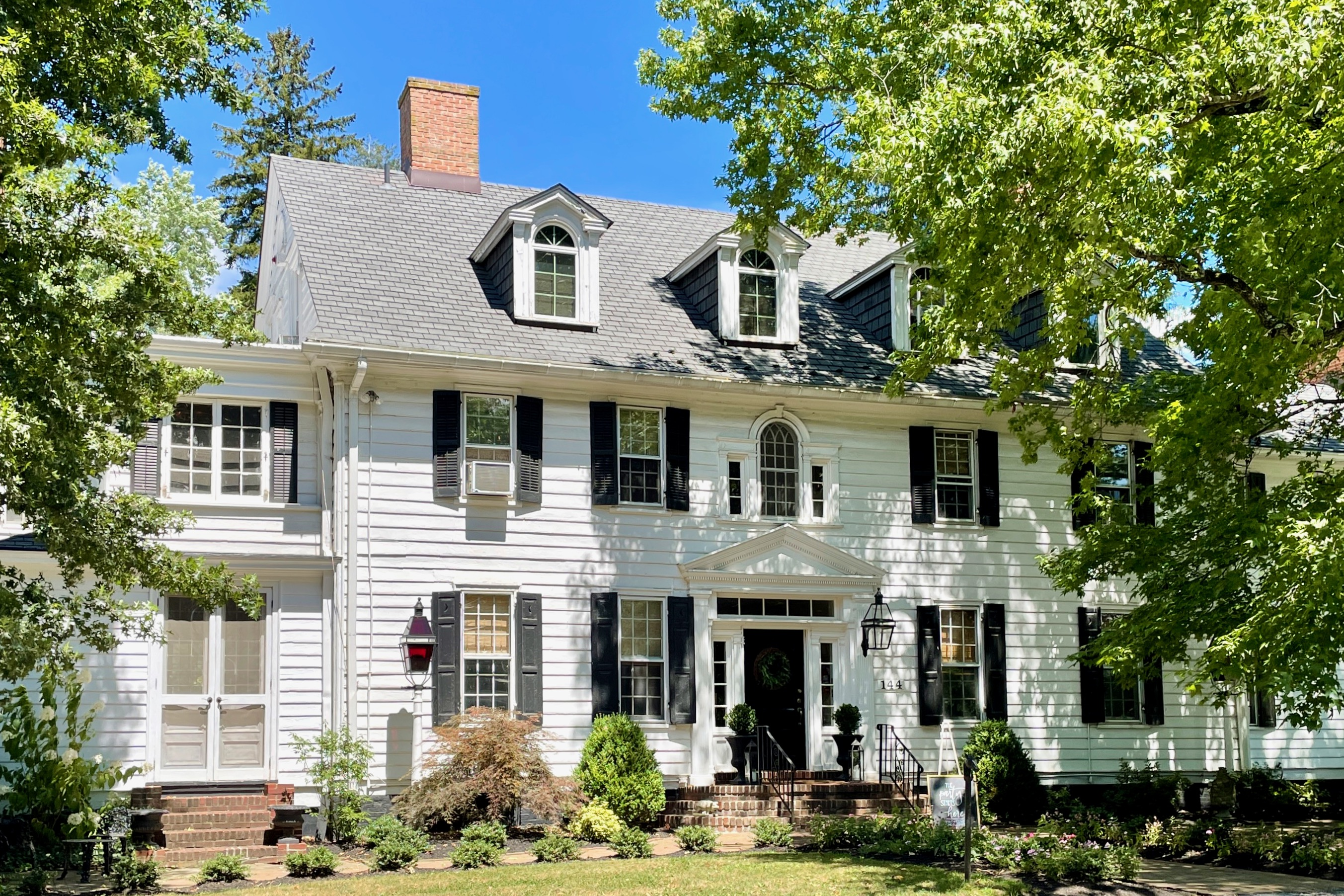
- John Newbold House, the Inn at Fernbrook Farms

- Seal

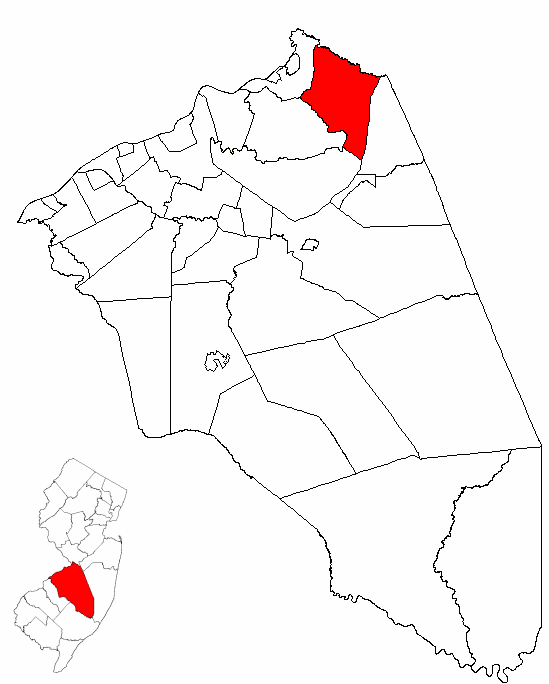
- Location of Chesterfield Township in Burlington County highlighted in red (right). Inset map: Location of Burlington County in New Jersey highlighted in red (left).

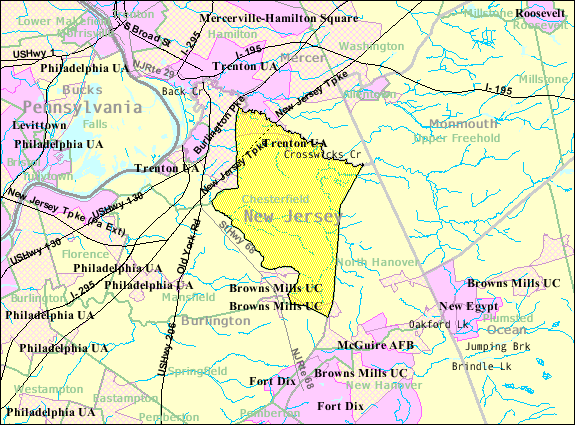
- Census Bureau map of Chesterfield Township, New Jersey

- Location in Burlington County Location in New Jersey Location in the United States
- Coordinates: 40.119177°N 74.662894°W
- Country: United States
- State: New Jersey
- County: Burlington
- Formed: November 6, 1688
- Royal charter: January 10, 1713
- Incorporated: February 21, 1798
- Named after: Chesterfield, Derbyshire, England

Government
  - Type: Township
  - Body: Township Committee
  - Mayor: Rebecca Hughes (R, December 31, 2026)
  - Municipal clerk: Caryn Hoyer

Area
  - Total: 21.46 sq mi (55.57 km^{2})
  - Land: 21.31 sq mi (55.20 km^{2})
  - Water: 0.14 sq mi (0.37 km^{2}) 0.67%
  - Rank: 131st of 565 in state 14th of 40 in county
- Elevation: 92 ft (28 m)

Population (2020)
  - Total: 9,422
  - Estimate (2023): 9,330
  - Rank: 253rd of 565 in state 17th of 40 in county
  - Density: 442.1/sq mi (170.7/km^{2})
  - Rank: 448th of 565 in state 29th of 40 in county
- Time zone: UTC−05:00 (Eastern (EST))
  - Summer (DST): UTC−04:00 (Eastern (EDT))
- ZIP Code: 08515 – Crosswicks
- Area code: 609 exchanges: 291, 298
- FIPS code: 3400512670
- GNIS feature ID: 0882109
- Website: www.chesterfieldtwpnj.gov

Chesterfield Township is a township in Burlington County, in the U.S. state of New Jersey. As of the 2020 United States census, the township's population was 9,422, its highest decennial census count ever and an increase of 1,723 (+22.4%) from the 2010 census count of 7,699, which in turn had reflected an increase of 1,744 (+29.3%) from the 5,955 counted at the 2000 census. The township, and all of Burlington County, is a part of the Philadelphia metropolitan area.

Chesterfield has permanently preserved more than 7,000 acres (2,800 ha) of farmland through state and county programs and a township-wide transfer of development credits program that directs future growth to a designated "receiving area" known as Old York Village, which is a neo-traditional, New Urbanism community built on 560 acres (230 ha) incorporating a variety of housing types, neighborhood commercial facilities, a new elementary school, civic uses, and active and passive open space areas with preserved agricultural land surrounding the planned village. Construction began in the early 2000s and a significant percentage of the community is now complete. As of 2024, the majority of the construction is complete, including Old York Village's mixed-use commercial, retail, and housing component. Old York Village was the winner of the American Planning Association's National Outstanding Planning Award in 2004.

== History ==
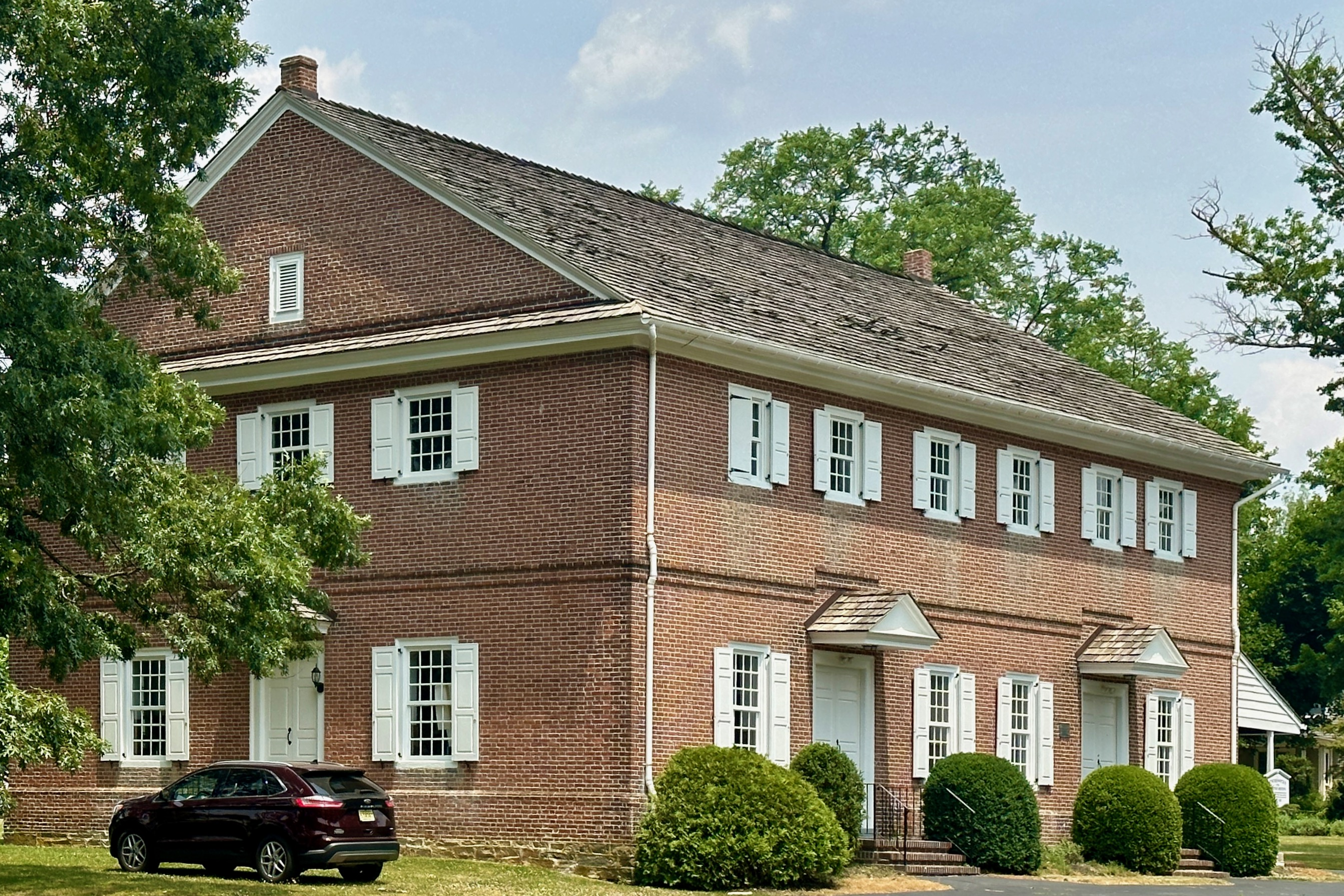
Crosswicks Friends Meeting House

The land was first settled in 1677, when a group of primarily Quaker immigrants from England established the settlement of Crosswicks, the oldest of the three communities of the township. The village was named after the Crosswicks Creek that separates Burlington and Mercer counties. The other two villages were Recklesstown (now Chesterfield) and Plattsburg (now Sykesville). Recklesstown was named in honor of one of its founders, Joseph Reckless, until the community's name was changed in 1888 at the urging of a Congressman and local resident in the face of public scorn.

Chesterfield Township was originally formed on November 6, 1688. It was named after the 2nd Earl of Chesterfield whose seat of Chesterfield was in Derbyshire, where many of the township's earliest settlers had lived. The township was reformed by royal charter on January 10, 1713, and was incorporated as one of New Jersey's initial 104 townships by the Township Act of 1798 of the New Jersey Legislature on February 21, 1798. Portions of the township were taken to form New Hanover Township (December 2, 1723) and Bordentown borough (December 9, 1825).

Crosswicks played a role during the American Revolutionary War. On June 23, 1778, British soldiers near the Crosswicks Creek shot the horse out from under Elias Dayton, a captain with the New Jersey militia. A cannonball from the period remains lodged in the side of the Friends Meeting House.

== Geography ==
According to the United States Census Bureau, the township had a total area of 21.45 square miles (55.57 km^{2}), including 21.31 square miles (55.20 km^{2}) of land and 0.14 square miles (0.37 km^{2}) of water (0.67%).

Municipalities bordering the township are Bordentown Township, Mansfield Township, North Hanover Township, Springfield Township in Burlington County; and Hamilton Township in Mercer County.

Unincorporated communities, localities and place names located partially or completely within the township include Chesterfield, Crosswicks, Davisville and Extonville.

== Demographics ==
Historical population
Census	Pop.	Note	%±
1810	1,839		—
1820	2,087		13.5%
1830	2,385		14.3%
1840	3,438	*	44.2%
1850	1,789		−48.0%
1860	1,628		−9.0%
1870	1,748		7.4%
1880	1,525		−12.8%
1890	1,253		−17.8%
1900	1,143		−8.8%
1910	1,130		−1.1%
1920	1,133		0.3%
1930	1,269		12.0%
1940	1,766		39.2%
1950	2,020		14.4%
1960	2,519		24.7%
1970	3,190		26.6%
1980	3,867		21.2%
1990	5,152		33.2%
2000	5,955		15.6%
2010	7,699		29.3%
2020	9,422		22.4%
2023 (est.)	9,330		−1.0%
Population sources: 1800–1920 1840 1850–1870; 1850 1870 1880–1890; 1890–1910 1910–1930; 1940–2000 2000; 2010 2020 * = Lost territory in previous decade

=== 2010 census ===
The 2010 United States census counted 7,699 people, 1,539 households, and 1,311 families in the township. The population density was 360.9 per square mile (139.3/km^{2}). There were 1,601 housing units at an average density of 75.0 per square mile (29.0/km^{2}). The racial makeup was 53.98% (4,156) White, 29.12% (2,242) Black or African American, 0.51% (39) Native American, 8.35% (643) Asian, 0.03% (2) Pacific Islander, 5.01% (386) from other races, and 3.00% (231) from two or more races. Hispanic or Latino of any race were 13.08% (1,007) of the population.

Of the 1,539 households, 46.1% had children under the age of 18; 75.7% were married couples living together; 6.3% had a female householder with no husband present and 14.8% were non-families. Of all households, 10.6% were made up of individuals and 3.9% had someone living alone who was 65 years of age or older. The average household size was 3.02 and the average family size was 3.26.

17.8% of the population were under the age of 18, 36.2% from 18 to 24, 24.4% from 25 to 44, 16.1% from 45 to 64, and 5.4% who were 65 years of age or older. The median age was 24.4 years. For every 100 females, the population had 220.4 males. For every 100 females ages 18 and older there were 268.5 males. The census statistics above include residents of a state youth detention center located at the northwest edge of Chesterfield Township, on the border with Hamilton Township.

The Census Bureau's 2006–2010 American Community Survey showed that (in 2010 inflation-adjusted dollars) median household income was $113,125 (with a margin of error of +/− $10,124) and the median family income was $120,288 (+/− $8,240). Males had a median income of $76,563 (+/− $13,303) versus $58,229 (+/− $12,489) for females. The per capita income for the borough was $20,655 (+/− $4,105). About none of families and 0.9% of the population were below the poverty line, including none of those under age 18 and 2.0% of those age 65 or over.

=== 2000 census ===
As of the 2000 United States census there were 5,955 people, 899 households, and 744 families residing in the township. The population density was 278.1 inhabitants per square mile (107.4/km^{2}). There were 924 housing units at an average density of 43.1 per square mile (16.6/km^{2}). The racial makeup of the township was 49.71% White, 37.36% African American, 0.67% Native American, 0.64% Asian, 0.08% Pacific Islander, 8.45% from other races, and 3.09% from two or more races. Hispanic or Latino people of any race were 12.34% of the population. The census statistics above included 3,341 residents of state correctional facilities located in the township.

There were 899 households, out of which 38.8% had children under the age of 18 living with them, 72.6% were married couples living together, 6.3% had a female householder with no husband present, and 17.2% were non-families. 12.8% of all households were made up of individuals, and 4.8% had someone living alone who was 65 years of age or older. The average household size was 2.91 and the average family size was 3.19.

In the township the population was spread out, with 11.8% under the age of 18, 40.7% from 18 to 24, 29.8% from 25 to 44, 12.6% from 45 to 64, and 5.0% who were 65 years of age or older. The median age was 25 years. For every 100 females, there were 345.7 males. For every 100 females age 18 and over, there were 423.4 males.

The median income for a household in the township was $85,428, and the median income for a family was $91,267. Males had a median income of $50,305 versus $44,659 for females. The per capita income for the township was $17,193. (The per capita income figure is artificially low due to the above-mentioned youth detention center population.) About 0.4% of families and 1.8% of the population were below the poverty line, including none of those under age 18 and 1.0% of those age 65 or over.

== Real estate ==
Chesterfield Township real estate prices were ranked second-highest in Burlington County by Philadelphia magazine in February 2010. Average real estate prices were listed at $411,000, behind Moorestown Township which was rated highest in the county with an average real estate price of $463,000.

== Government ==
=== Local government ===
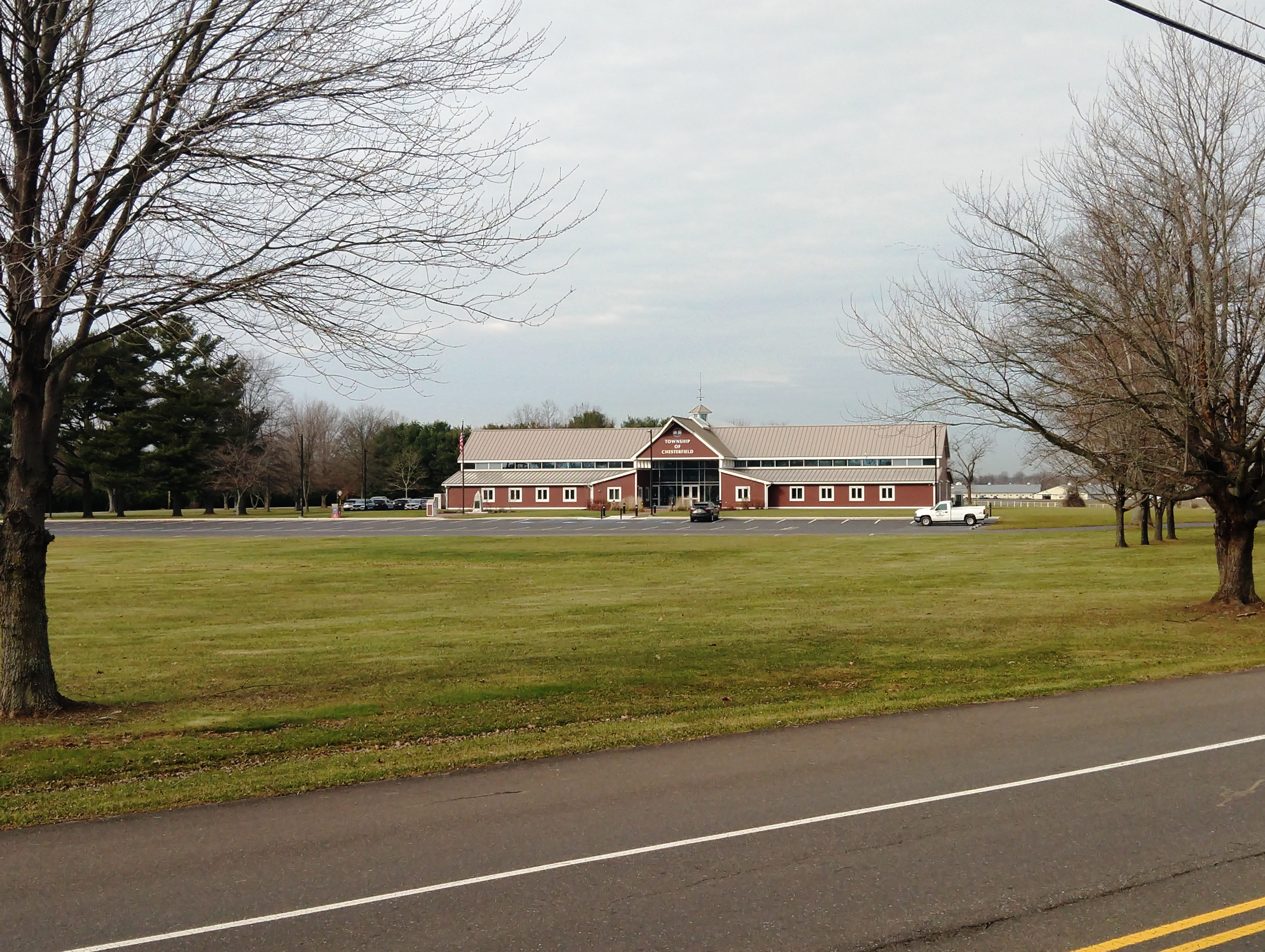
Chesterfield Township municipal building

Chesterfield Township is governed under the township form of New Jersey municipal government, one of 141 municipalities (of the 564) statewide that use this form, the second-most commonly used form of government in the state. The Township Committee is comprised of five members, who are elected directly by the voters at-large in partisan elections to serve three-year terms of office on a staggered basis, with either one or two seats coming up for election each year as part of the November general election in a three-year cycle. At a reorganization meeting held in January of each year, the Township Committee selects one of its members to serve as Mayor and another as Deputy Mayor, which by tradition has the committeeperson serving the last year of term in office chosen to serve as mayor. The Township Committee serves both as the township's executive and legislative body, and derives from the state statutes which delegates powers, prescribe the offices and structure and establish various procedures under which the Township must operate. In the 2013 general election, voters approved an expansion of the Township Committee from three members to five, with three seats up for election in November 2014; the existing seat expiring that year, a new three-year seat and a seat with a two-year term, with the full cycle starting as of the 2015 general election.

As of 2024, members of the Chesterfield Township Committee are Mayor Matthew Litt (D, term on committee and as mayor ends December 31, 2023), Deputy Mayor Denise E. Koetas-Dale (D, term on committee ends 2026; term as deputy mayor ends 2024), Belinda Blazic (R, 2024), Shreekant Dhopte (D, 2025) and Rebecca Hughes (R, 2026).

After the November 2016 general election ended with a tie between Democrat Rita Romeu and Republican Ron Kolczynski who both had 1,289 votes for the second of two township committee seats, a judge in January 2017 decided that Romeu won the race as she was entitled to two additional votes that had not been counted in November.

=== Federal, state and county representation ===
Chesterfield Township is located in the 3rd Congressional District and is part of New Jersey's 8th state legislative district.

For the 119th United States Congress, New Jersey's 3rd congressional district is currently represented Herb Conaway (D, Delran Township). New Jersey is represented in the United States Senate by Democrats Cory Booker (Newark, term ends 2027) and Andy Kim (Moorestown, term ends 2031).

For the 2026–2027 session, the 8th legislative district of the New Jersey Legislature is represented in the New Jersey Senate by Latham Tiver (R, Southampton Township) and in the General Assembly by Anthony Angelozzi (D, Hammonton) and Andrea Katz (D, Chesterfield Township).

Burlington County is governed by a Board of County Commissioners comprised of five members who are chosen at-large in partisan elections to serve three-year terms of office on a staggered basis, with either one or two seats coming up for election each year; at an annual reorganization meeting, the board selects a director and deputy director from among its members to serve a one-year term. As of 2026, Burlington County's Commissioners are: Director Felicia Hopson (D, Willingboro Township, term as commissioner ends December 31, 2027; term as director ends 2026), Deputy Director Allison Eckel (D, Medford, term as commissioner ends 2028; term as deputy director ends 2026), Randy Brolo (D, Lumberton, 2026; elected to an unexpired term), Tyler Burrell (D, Delran Township, 2027) and Tom Pullion (D, Edgewater Park, 2026).

Burlington County's constitutional officers are Clerk Joanne Schwartz (D, Southampton Township, 2028), Sheriff James H. Kostoplis (D, Bordentown, 2028) and Surrogate Brian J. Carlin (D, Burlington Township, 2026).

=== Politics ===
United States presidential election results for Chesterfield Township 2024 2020 2016 2012 2008 2004
Year	Republican		Democratic		Third party(ies)	
Year	No.	%	No.	%	No.	%
2024	1,686	48.64%	1,701	49.08%	79	2.28%
2020	1,676	46.40%	1,906	52.77%	30	0.83%
2016	1,336	49.41%	1,264	46.75%	104	3.85%
2012	1,189	49.11%	1,195	49.36%	37	1.53%
2008	1,058	48.55%	1,089	49.98%	32	1.47%
2004	896	55.04%	713	43.80%	19	1.17%

As of March 2011, there were a total of 2,855 registered voters in Chesterfield Township, of which 682 (23.9% vs. 33.3% countywide) were registered as Democrats, 864 (30.3% vs. 23.9%) were registered as Republicans and 1,304 (45.7% vs. 42.8%) were registered as Unaffiliated. There were 5 voters registered as Libertarians or Greens. Among the township's 2010 Census population, 37.1% (vs. 61.7% in Burlington County) were registered to vote, including 45.1% of those ages 18 and over (vs. 80.3% countywide).

In the 2012 presidential election, Democrat Barack Obama received 1,195 votes (49.1% vs. 58.1% countywide), ahead of Republican Mitt Romney with 1,189 votes (48.8% vs. 40.2%) and other candidates with 37 votes (1.5% vs. 1.0%), among the 2,436 ballots cast by the township's 3,129 registered voters, for a turnout of 77.9% (vs. 74.5% in Burlington County). In the 2008 presidential election, Democrat Barack Obama received 1,089 votes (49.4% vs. 58.4% countywide), ahead of Republican John McCain with 1,058 votes (48.0% vs. 39.9%) and other candidates with 32 votes (1.5% vs. 1.0%), among the 2,204 ballots cast by the township's 2,681 registered voters, for a turnout of 82.2% (vs. 80.0% in Burlington County). In the 2004 presidential election, Republican George W. Bush received 896 votes (54.8% vs. 46.0% countywide), ahead of Democrat John Kerry with 713 votes (43.6% vs. 52.9%) and other candidates with 19 votes (1.2% vs. 0.8%), among the 1,636 ballots cast by the township's 1,986 registered voters, for a turnout of 82.4% (vs. 78.8% in the whole county).

Gubernatorial election results for Chesterfield Township
Year	Republican		Democratic		Third party(ies)	
Year	No.	%	No.	%	No.	%
2025	1,331	46.57%	1,508	52.76%	19	0.66%
2021	1,232	51.61%	1,139	47.72%	16	0.67%
2017	916	49.25%	905	48.66%	39	2.10%
2013	975	65.83%	476	32.14%	30	2.03%
2009	837	55.50%	580	38.46%	91	6.03%
2005	632	55.49%	438	38.45%	69	6.06%

In the 2013 gubernatorial election, Republican Chris Christie received 975 votes (64.6% vs. 61.4% countywide), ahead of Democrat Barbara Buono with 476 votes (31.5% vs. 35.8%) and other candidates with 30 votes (2.0% vs. 1.2%), among the 1,509 ballots cast by the township's 3,138 registered voters, yielding a 48.1% turnout (vs. 44.5% in the county). In the 2009 gubernatorial election, Republican Chris Christie received 837 votes (55.1% vs. 47.7% countywide), ahead of Democrat Jon Corzine with 580 votes (38.2% vs. 44.5%), Independent Chris Daggett with 57 votes (3.8% vs. 4.8%) and other candidates with 34 votes (2.2% vs. 1.2%), among the 1,518 ballots cast by the township's 2,786 registered voters, yielding a 54.5% turnout (vs. 44.9% in the county).

United States Senate election results for Chesterfield Township1
Year	Republican		Democratic		Third party(ies)	
Year	No.	%	No.	%	No.	%
2024	1,524	44.97%	1,794	52.94%	71	2.10%
2018	1,256	50.52%	1,083	43.56%	147	5.91%
2012	1,144	49.65%	1,129	49.00%	31	1.35%
2006	648	54.55%	512	43.10%	28	2.36%

United States Senate election results for Chesterfield Township2
Year	Republican		Democratic		Third party(ies)	
Year	No.	%	No.	%	No.	%
2020	1,707	47.95%	1,825	51.26%	28	0.79%
2014	760	52.56%	647	44.74%	39	2.70%
2013	495	56.06%	376	42.58%	12	1.36%
2008	1,032	52.17%	918	46.41%	28	1.42%

== Education ==
The Chesterfield School District serves students in public school for pre-kindergarten through sixth grade at Chesterfield Elementary School. As of the 2020–21 school year, the district, comprised of one school, had an enrollment of 723 students and 67.0 classroom teachers (on an FTE basis), for a student–teacher ratio of 10.8:1. A replacement school building for grades K–6 was planned based on the results of a referendum passed in December 2007 that provided for spending of $37.7 million towards the project. The new school opened in January 2011, after having been pushed back from an original target opening date of September 2010.

Public school students in seventh through twelfth grades attend the schools of the Northern Burlington County Regional School District, which also serves students from Mansfield Township, North Hanover Township and Springfield Township, along with children of United States Air Force personnel based at McGuire Air Force Base. The schools in the district (with 2020–21 enrollment data from the National Center for Education Statistics) are Northern Burlington County Regional Middle School with 743 students in grades 7 - 8 and Northern Burlington County Regional High School with 1,403 students in grades 9-12. Both schools are in the Columbus section of Mansfield Township. Using a formula that reflects the population and the value of the assessed property in each of the constituent municipalities, taxpayers in Chesterfield Township pay 21.6% of the district's tax levy, with the district's 2013–2014 budget including $35.6 million in spending. The 7–12 district's board of education has nine members, who are elected directly by voters to serve three-year terms of office on a staggered basis, with three seats up for election each year. The nine seats on the Board of Education are allocated based on the population of the constituent municipalities, with two seats assigned to Chesterfield Township.

Students from Chesterfield Township, and from all of Burlington County, are eligible to attend the Burlington County Institute of Technology, a countywide public school district that serves the vocational and technical education needs of students at the high school and post-secondary level at its campuses in Medford and Westampton Township.

== Transportation ==
As of May 2010, the township had a total of 58.79 miles (94.61 km) of roadways, of which 38.50 miles (61.96 km) were maintained by the municipality, 18.17 miles (29.24 km) by Burlington County and 2.12 miles (3.41 km) by the New Jersey Turnpike Authority.

Major county roads that pass through include Route 528, Route 537 and Route 545.

The New Jersey Turnpike (Interstate 95) passes through the northwestern part of the township, entering on the western border with Bordentown Township and continuing for approximately 2.1 miles (3.4 km) into Hamilton Township in Mercer County. The nearest interchange is Exit 7 in neighboring Bordentown Township.

From 2004 when plans were announced until its completion in early November 2014, the Turnpike was widened along a 35-mile (56 km) stretch between Interchange 6 in Mansfield Township to Interchange 9 in East Brunswick in Middlesex County. Two new carriageways (to accommodate the outer roadways, or truck lanes) were built from Interchange 6 to Interchange 8A in Monroe Township, Middlesex County, and an additional lane on the existing outer roadways was added as well between Interchanges 8A and 9, bringing the roadway up to 12 lanes of traffic in a 3-3-3-3 "dual-dual" configuration of separate truck and car lanes in each direction.

There is no public transportation provided in the township. In neighboring Bordentown, the RiverLINE provides service to Camden and Trenton. NJ Transit provides service on the Northeast Corridor Line to New York Penn Station from the Hamilton station in nearby Hamilton Township, where many township residents commute for work.

== Notable people ==
People who were born in, residents of, or otherwise closely associated with Chesterfield Township include:

- Kenneth R. Blackmon (born c. 1967), reserve United States Navy Rear Admiral who has been serving as Vice Commander of United States Fleet Forces Command since October 1, 2023
- Antron Brown (born 1976), drag racer who became the sport's first African American champion when he won the 2012 Top Fuel National Hot Rod Association championship
- Andrea Katz (born 1978 or 1979), politician serving as a member of the New Jersey General Assembly for the 8th legislative district since January 2024
- Charles Newbold (1764–1835), blacksmith who, in 1797, received the first patent for a cast iron plow
- Ely Playter (1776–1858), farmer, lumberman, militia officer and member of the Upper Canada House of Assembly
