= Davisville =

Davisville may refer to:

- Davisville, former name of Davis, California
- Davisville, Missouri, unincorporated community in Missouri, United States
- Davisville, New Jersey, unincorporated community in Burlington County
- Davisville, Rhode Island, former home of the U.S. Navy SeaBees
- Davisville, West Virginia, unincorporated community in West Virginia, United States
- Davisville Village, neighbourhood of Toronto, Ontario, Canada
  - Davisville (TTC), subway stop in Toronto, Ontario, Canada
  - Davisville Subway Yard, the first subway yard in Toronto
- Davisville, Wentworth Falls, a heritage-listed house in Wentworth Falls, in the Blue Mountains region of New South Wales, Australia
