= Chesterfield, New Jersey =

Populated place in Burlington County, New Jersey, US

- Unincorporated community
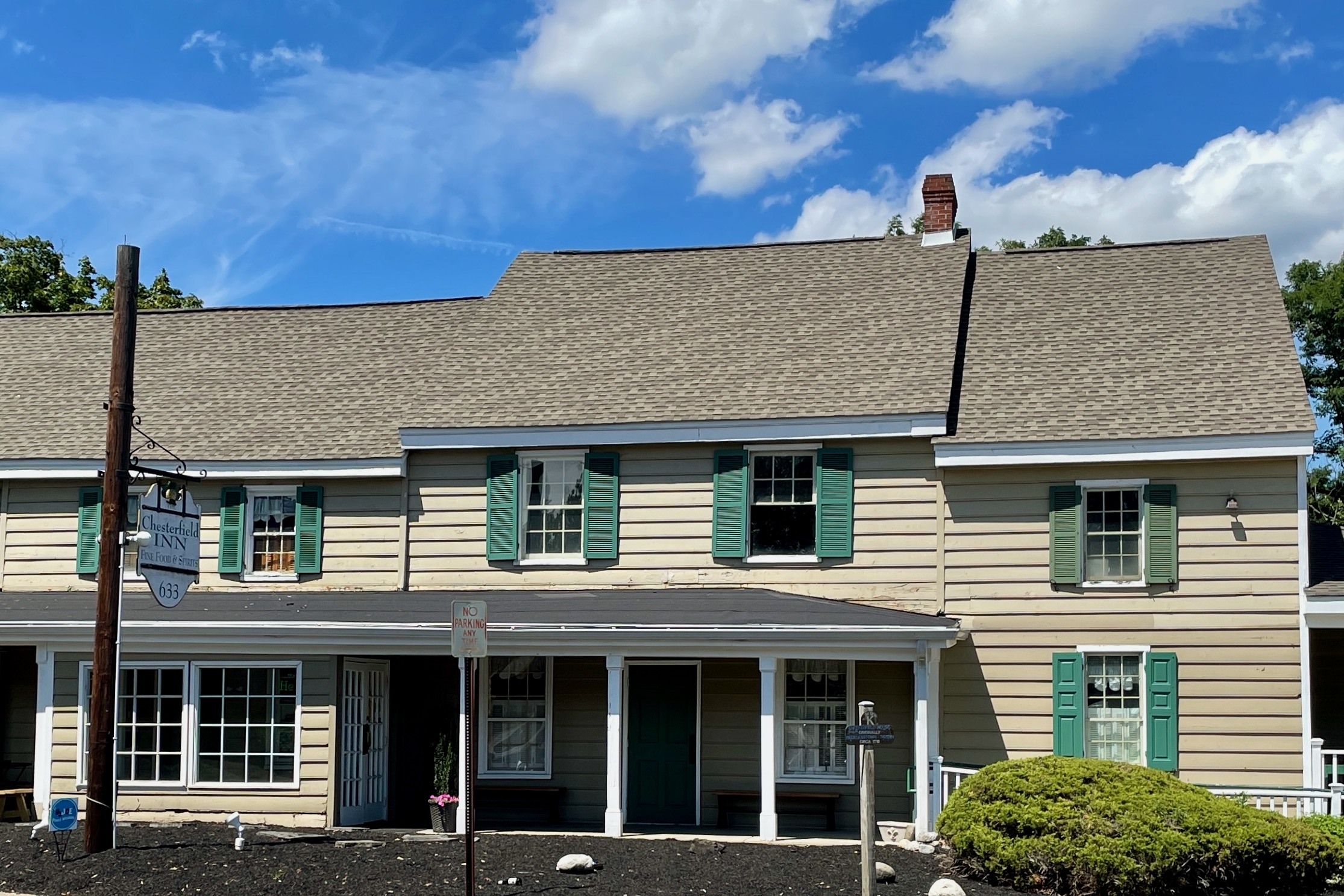
- The Chesterfield Inn

- Location within Burlington County, New Jersey Location within New Jersey Location within the United States
- Coordinates: 40°6′54″N 74°38′22″W
- Country: United States
- State: New Jersey
- County: Burlington
- Township: Chesterfield
- GNIS feature ID: 875404

Chesterfield, originally known as Recklesstown, is an unincorporated community located around the intersection of County Route 528 (Bordentown-Chesterfield Road, Chesterfield-Arneytown Road) and County Route 677 (Chesterfield-Georgetown Road) in Chesterfield Township of Burlington County, New Jersey.

== History ==
In the 1830s, the village had a store, hotel, church, and post office. The village was originally named after Joseph Reckless, who had bought a mill here in 1712. His grandsons, Anthony and Robert, served in the American Revolutionary War. The name of the community was changed to Chesterfield in 1888 by congressman Anthony Bullock. The oldest part of the Recklesstown Tavern, now the Chesterfield Inn, was built c. 1710. The tavern was expanded in 1774.

== Historic district ==
- Recklesstown Historic District
- U.S. National Register of Historic Places
- U.S. Historic district
- New Jersey Register of Historic Places
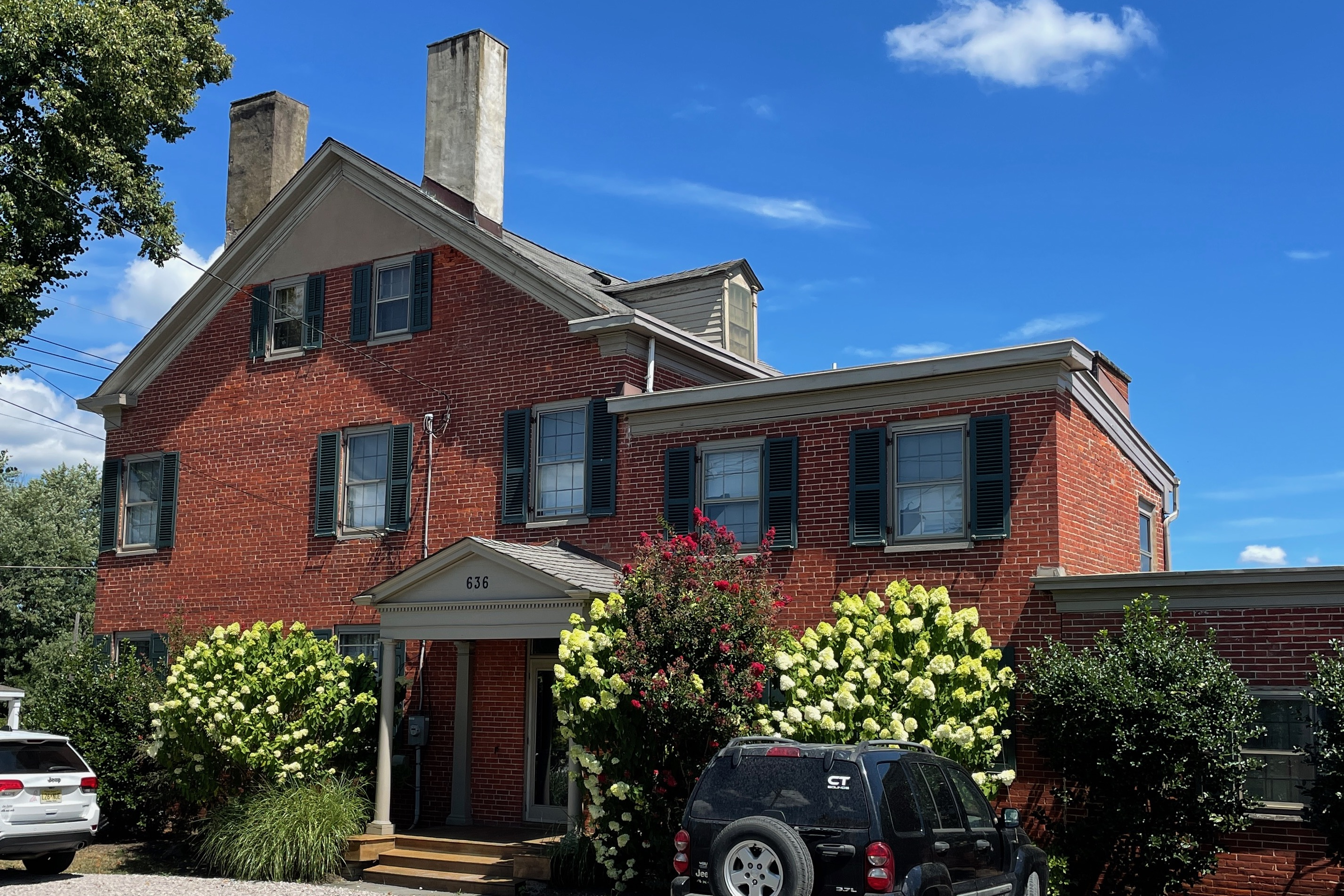
- Kessler House
- Area: 200 acres (81 ha)
- Architectural style: Late Victorian, Georgian
- NRHP reference No.: 75001125
- NJRHP No.: 781

Significant dates
- Added to NRHP: August 19, 1975
- Designated NJRHP: May 8, 1975

The Recklesstown Historic District is a 200-acre (81 ha) historic district encompassing the village. It was added to the National Register of Historic Places on August 19, 1975, for its significance in agriculture, religion, and transportation. The district includes 49 contributing buildings. The Kessler House is a two and one-half story brick building built c. 1849. The Chesterfield Baptist Church was built in 1848 and features Greek Doric columns. Across the street is the Clayton House, once the church rectory, now a florist.

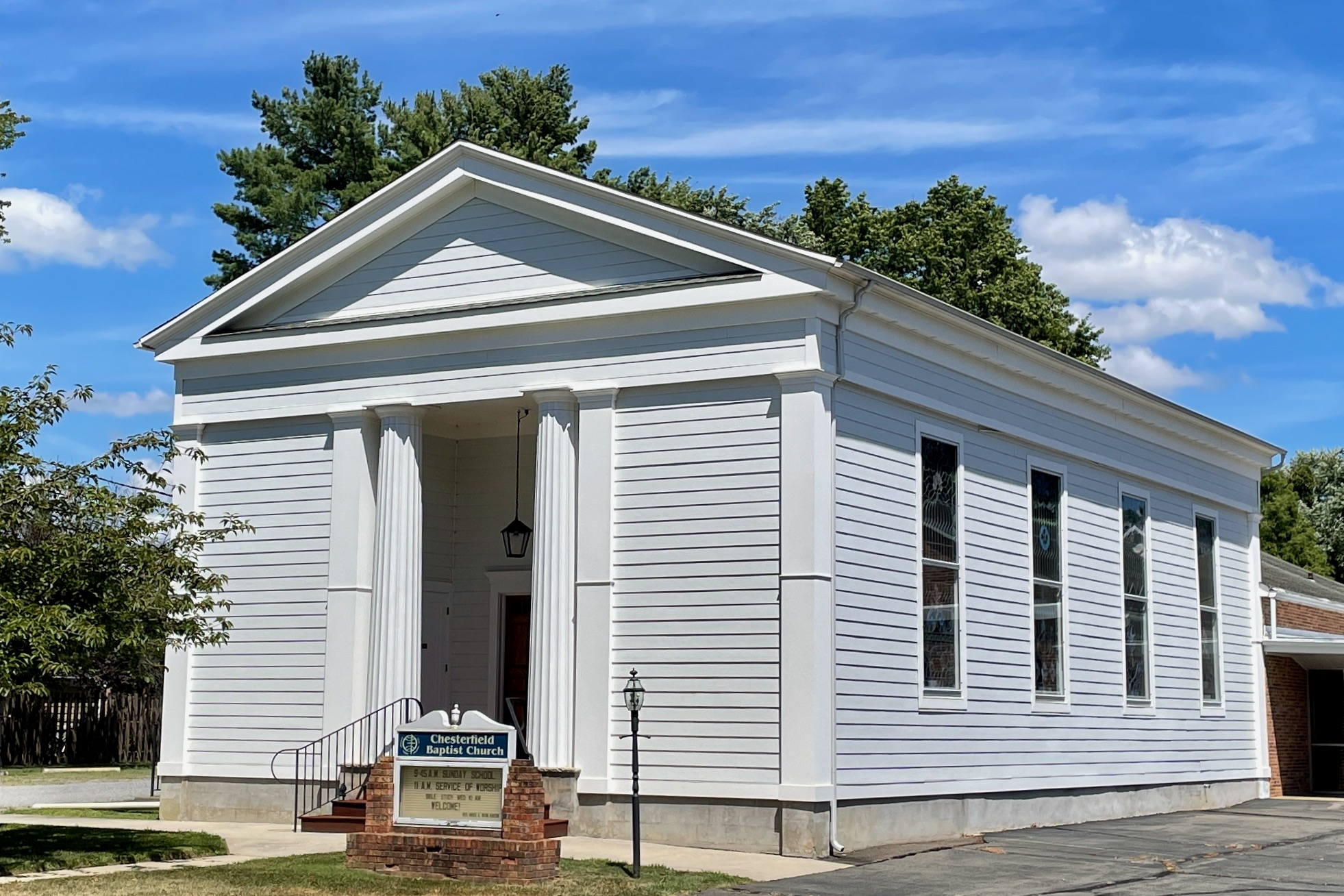
Chestefield Baptist Church

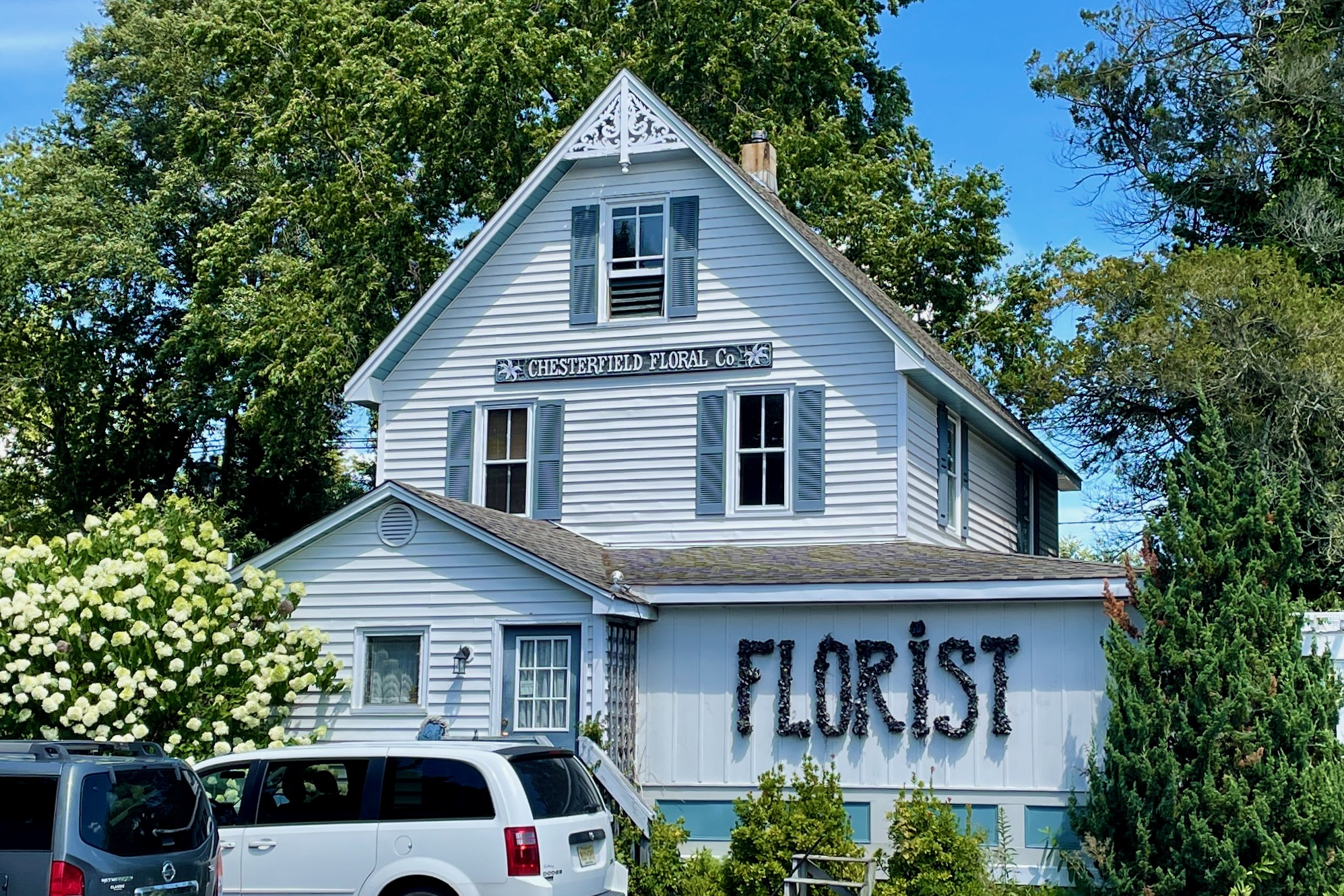
Clayton House

== Notable people ==
- Charles Newbold (1764–1835), blacksmith, invented the first one piece cast iron plow, patented in 1797

== See also ==
- National Register of Historic Places listings in Burlington County, New Jersey
- List of turnpikes in New Jersey
