= Kenneth R. Blackmon =

American naval officer (born c. 1967)

Rear Admiral Kenneth R. Blackmon
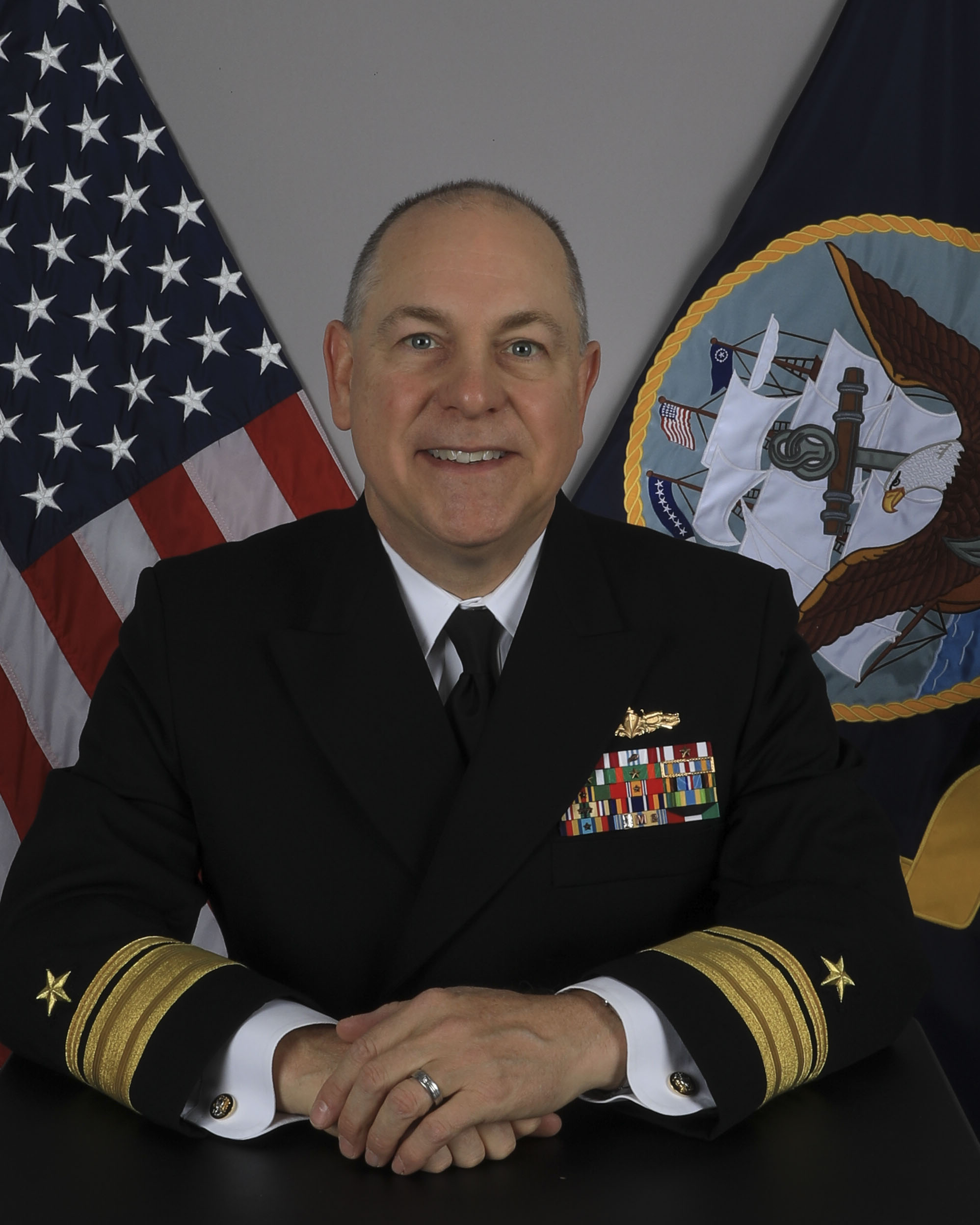
- Born: c. 1967 (age 58–59)
- Education: George Washington University (BA)
- Military career
- Allegiance: United States of America
- Branch: United States Navy
- Service years: 1989-1993 (active); 1993-present (reserve)
- Rank: Rear Admiral
- Conflicts: Operation Earnest Will; Gulf War; War in Afghanistan
- Awards: Legion of Merit; Defense Meritorious Service Medal (2); Meritorious Service Medal

Kenneth R. Blackmon is a reserve United States Navy officer who has been serving as Vice Commander, of United States Fleet Forces Command since October 1, 2023.

== Early life and education ==
Blackmon is a native of Chesterfield Township, New Jersey. He was commissioned in 1989 through the Naval Reserve Officer Training Corps program at George Washington University, where he earned a Bachelor of Arts in International Affairs with a specialization in International Economics. He also holds a Master of Science in Financial Planning, and is a graduate of the Air Command and Staff College.

== Military service ==
As a surface warfare officer, he served as strike warfare officer; electrical officer, and navigator/administrative officer aboard USS David R. Ray (DD-971). He was affiliated with the United States Navy Reserve in 1993.

Blackmon deployed five times in support of Operations Earnest Will, Desert Shield, Desert Storm, Noble Eagle, and Enduring Freedom. He has operated at sea in the Atlantic, Pacific, and Indian Oceans; Mediterranean, Caribbean, and Red Seas; Gulf of Mexico and the Arabian Gulf. Mobilizations include March to December 2003 to U.S. Pacific Fleet and June 2010 to July 2011 to U.S. Central Command. His last deployment was from July to August 2014 aboard USS America (LHA-6) as chief of staff, Task Force 49 during America's maiden transit around South America.

Staff assignments include Navy Reserve (NR) NATO Combined Joint Operations from the Sea Centre of Excellence, NR Joint Enabling Capabilities Command, NR Tactical Training Group Atlantic, NR Allied Command Transformation Detachment 106, NR Naval Control of Shipping Atlantic 304, and NR Naval Base Philadelphia.

Reserve Commands include NR Littoral Combat Ship Squadron 2, NR Expeditionary Strike Group 3, NR Fleet Technical Support Center Detachment 204, NR Recruiting Support Unit Detachment 466 and NR Mobile Mine Assembly Unit 3. He has joint experience with U.S. Central Command, U.S. Pacific Command, U.S. Transportation Command and NATO.

Blackmon served as Deputy Commander of the United States Third Fleet from October 2019 to September 2021. He assumed duties as Reserve Director, Maritime Operations, United States Fleet Forces Command in Norfolk, VA on 1 October 2021. In March 2023, he was nominated for promotion to rear admiral (upper half) with assignment as vice commander of United States Fleet Forces Command.
