= Crosswicks, New Jersey =

Populated place in Burlington County, New Jersey, US

- Census-designated place
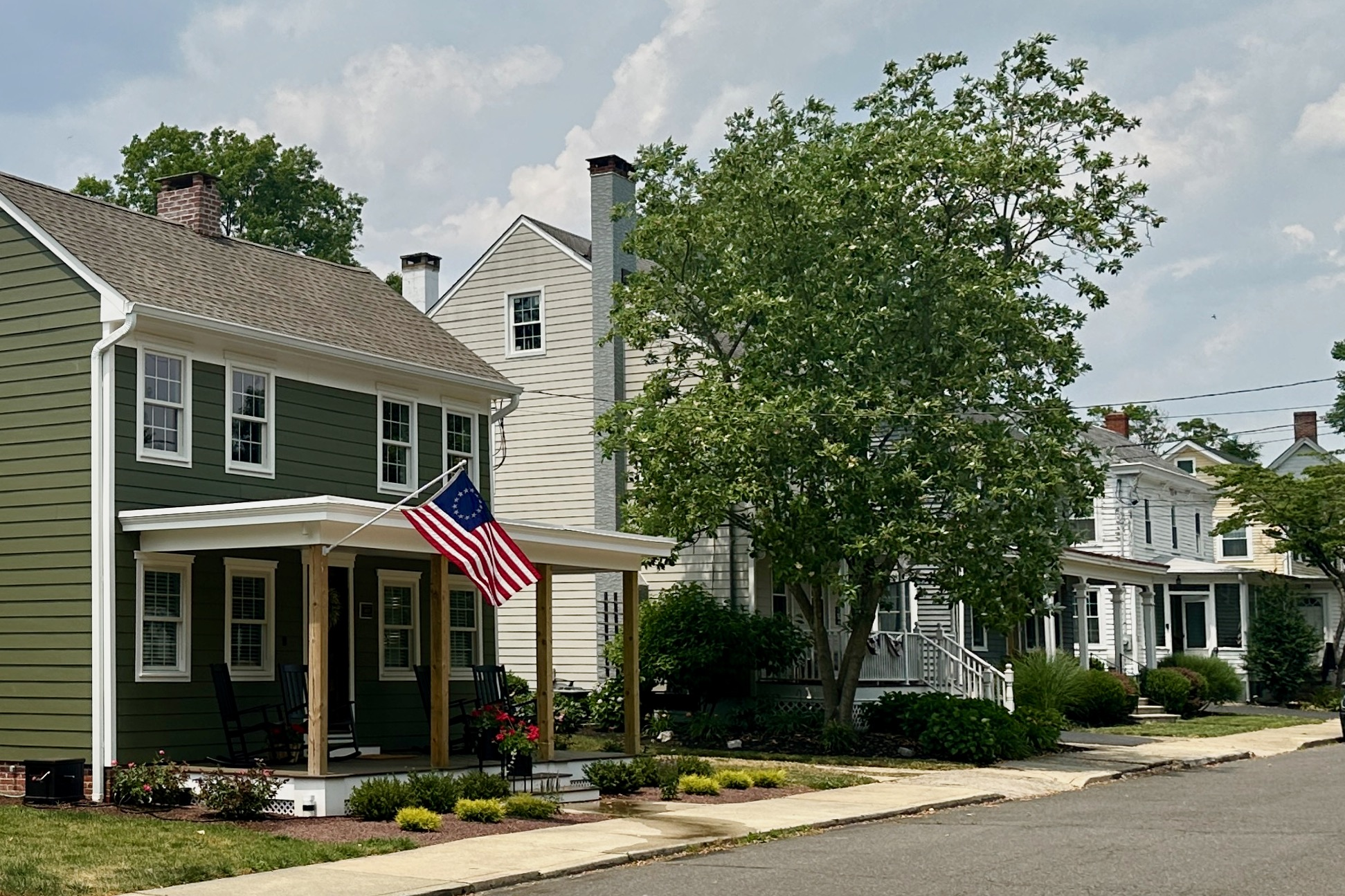
- The ‘Ryder Estate’ on Church Street, part of the Crosswicks Historic District

- Location of Crosswicks in Burlington County (Inset: Location of county within the state of New Jersey) Crosswicks (New Jersey) Crosswicks (the United States)
- Coordinates: 40°09′12″N 74°38′52″W
- Country: United States
- State: New Jersey
- County: Burlington
- Township: Chesterfield

Area
  - Total: 1.85 sq mi (4.78 km^{2})
  - Land: 1.83 sq mi (4.73 km^{2})
  - Water: 0.019 sq mi (0.05 km^{2})
- Elevation: 82 ft (25 m)

Population (2020)
  - Total: 849
  - Density: 465.2/sq mi (179.63/km^{2})
- Time zone: UTC−05:00 (Eastern (EST))
  - Summer (DST): UTC−04:00 (EDT)
- Area codes: 609, 640
- FIPS code: 34-16060
- GNIS feature ID: 875749

Crosswicks is an unincorporated community and census-designated place (CDP) located along the Crosswicks Creek in the northern part of Chesterfield Township in Burlington County in the U.S. state of New Jersey. The area is served as United States Postal Service ZIP Code 08515. As of the 2020 census, Crosswicks had a population of 849.

== History ==
Chesterfield Township comprises three distinct communities: Chesterfield, Crosswicks and Sykesville. The area was first settled in 1677, when a group primarily consisting of Quakers settled in the area of Crosswicks, the oldest of the Chesterfield's three villages. Its name derives from the Lenape language word "Crossweeksung", meaning "house of separation".

On June 23, 1778, during the American Revolutionary War, the Battle of Crosswicks was fought here over the bridge crossing the Crosswicks Creek. Philemon Dickinson, brigadier general in the New Jersey militia, and William Maxwell, brigadier general in the Continental Army, delayed the march of British troops led by General Henry Clinton, preceding the Battle of Monmouth on June 28.

Crosswicks is home to a Friends meeting house, as well as a historic library which used to house the Crosswicks Fire Department. The fire department's current home is in the former schoolhouse on New Street, which it has occupied since 1968. The building was completed in 1909. The current engine bay (where trucks are kept) was built in 1914, although the original 1909 cornerstone lies in the new section (it was moved).

The historic library, established in 1817 to serve Chesterfield Township, still served the community.

The Crosswicks Community Association holds an annual family-style croquet tournament and music festival on the village green in July. There is live music provided by local bands during the day. Food is available from vendors. There are lawn games set up for children.

== Historic district ==
- Crosswicks Historic District
- U.S. National Register of Historic Places
- U.S. Historic district
- New Jersey Register of Historic Places
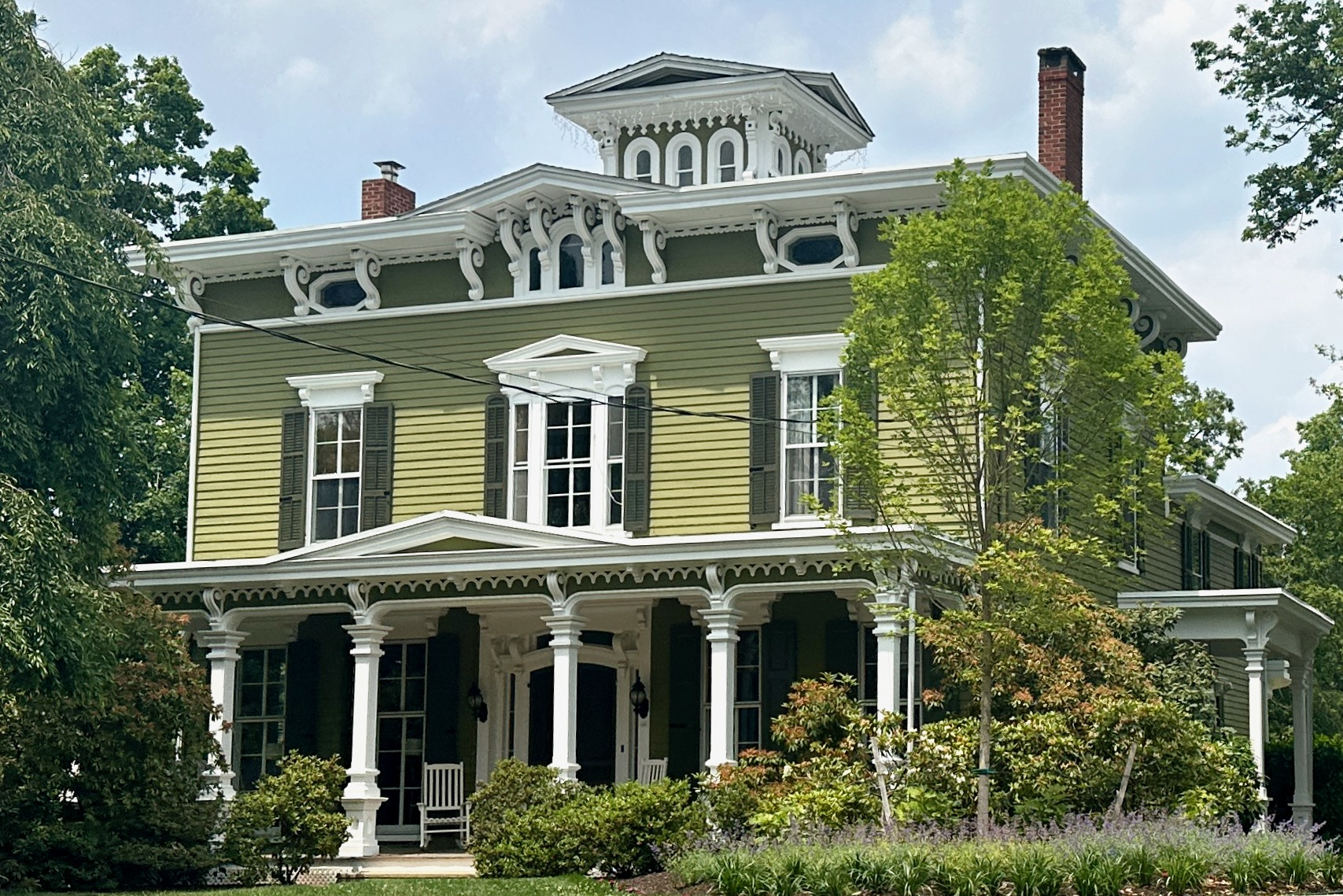
- J. M. Bunting House, built c. 1858
- Location: Chesterfield-Crosswicks Road, Main, Church and Front Streets
- Area: 50 acres (20 ha)
- Architectural style: Greek Revival, Gothic, Provincial Georgian
- NRHP reference No.: 76001146
- NJRHP No.: 777

Significant dates
- Added to NRHP: May 3, 1976
- Designated NJRHP: October 23, 1975

The Crosswicks Historic District is a 50-acre (20 ha) historic district encompassing the area along County Route 660 (Chesterfield-Crosswicks Road, Main Street), Church and Front Streets in the community. It was added to the National Register of Historic Places on May 3, 1976, for its significance in architecture, military history, religion, and transportation. The district has 95 contributing buildings, including the Crosswicks Friends Meeting House. The meeting house, historically known as the Chesterfield Friends Meeting House, was documented by the Historic American Buildings Survey (HABS) in 1936. Chesterfield Friends Meeting, now known as Crosswicks Friends Meeting, was founded in 1684. The first meeting house was built here in 1692. It was replaced by a larger brick building in 1706. The third and current one is a 2 1/2-story brick building from 1773 featuring Provincial Georgian architectural style. Next to it is the Friends First Day School which has the same style. The J. M. Bunting House is a three-story building featuring Italianate architecture. The public library building was formerly a firehouse.

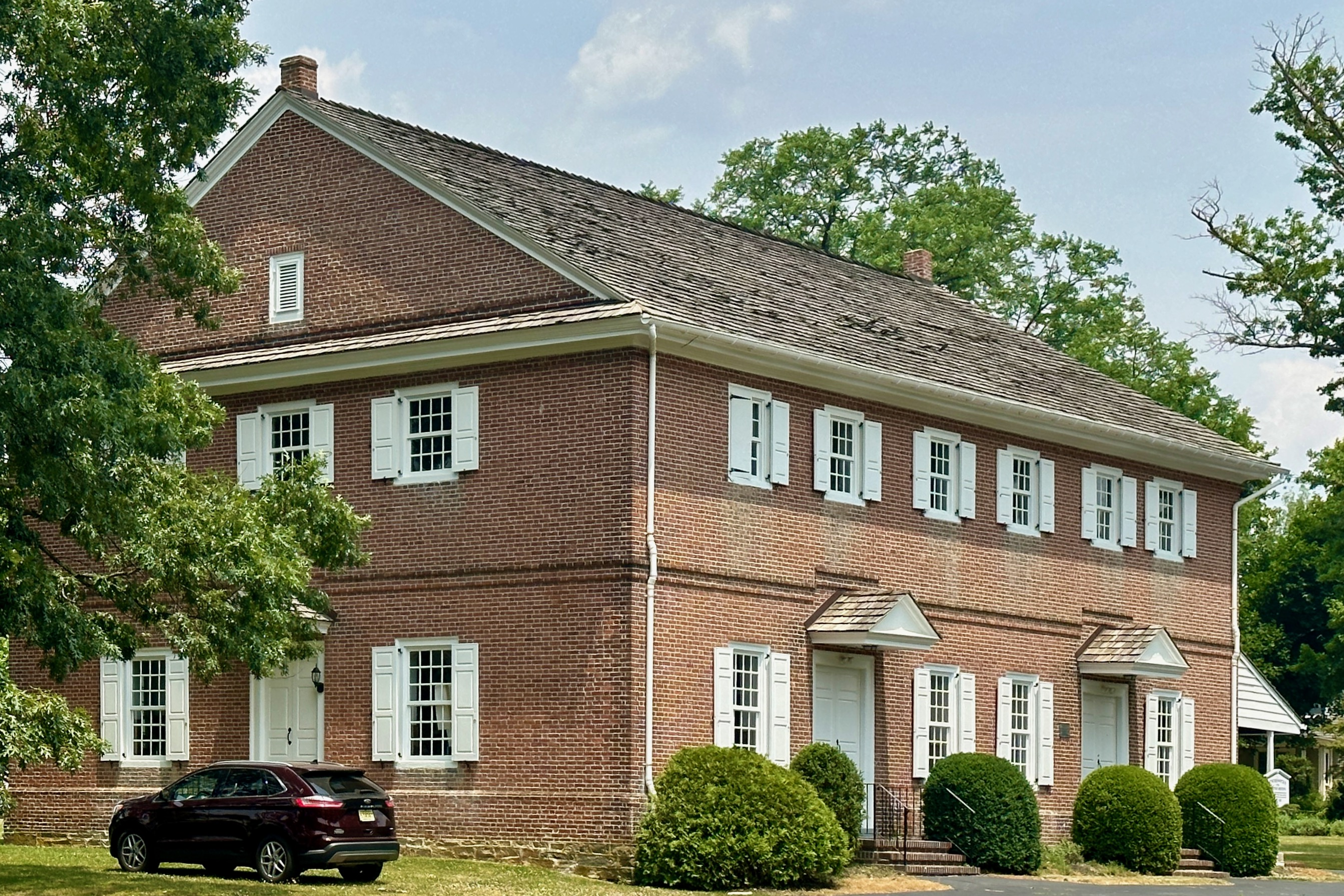
Crosswicks Friends Meeting House, built 1773

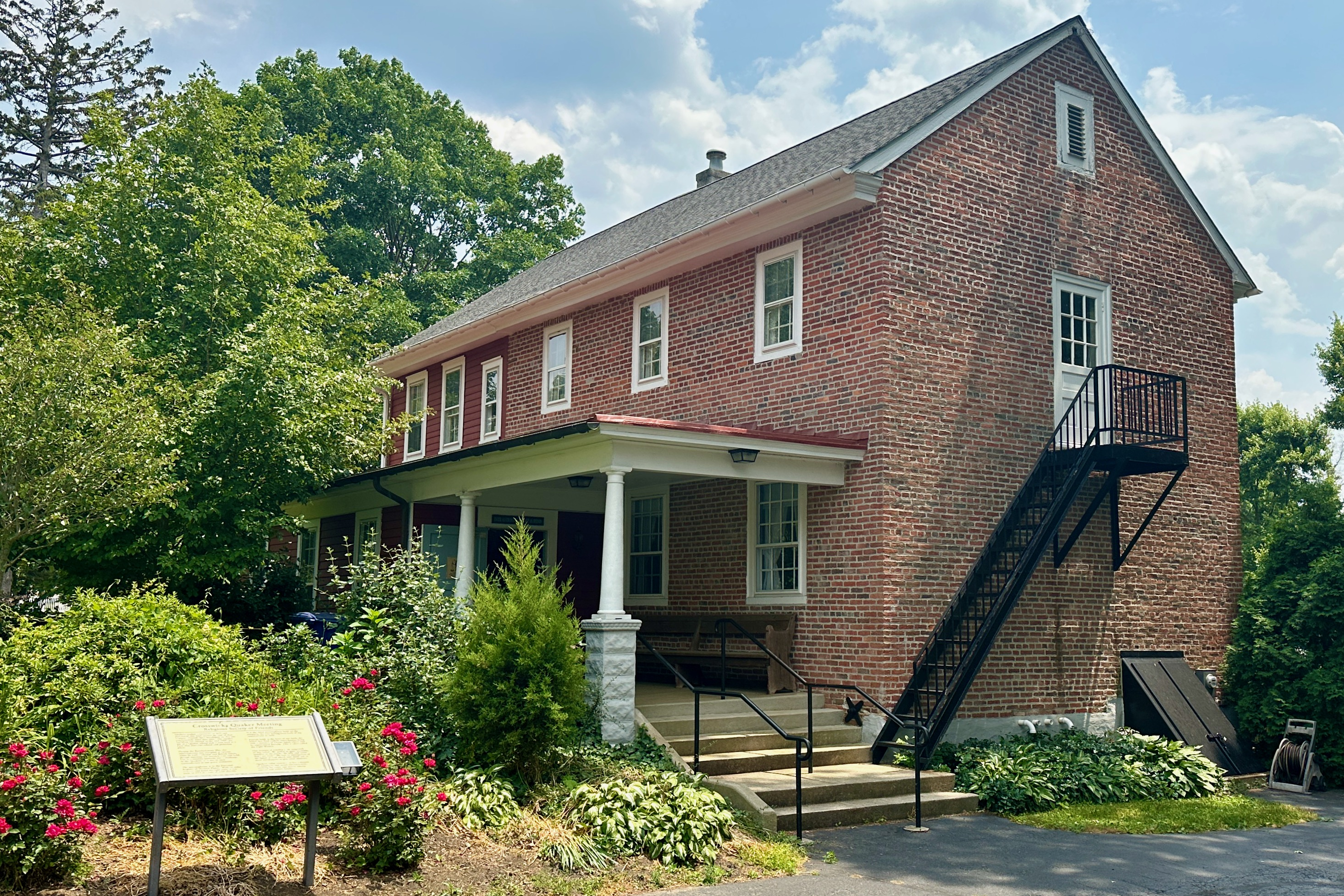
Friends First Day School, built c. 1784

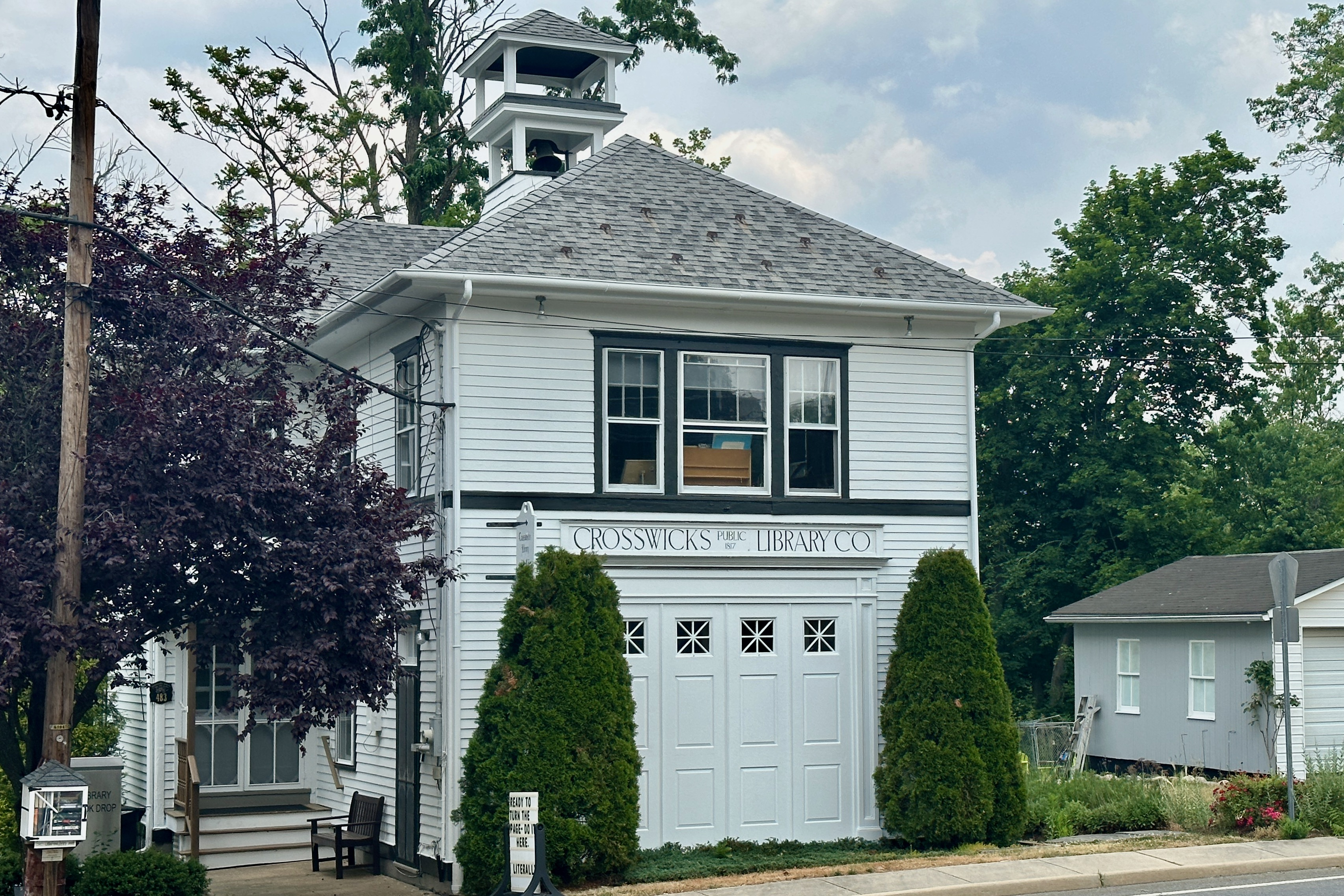
Crosswicks Public Library, built 1922

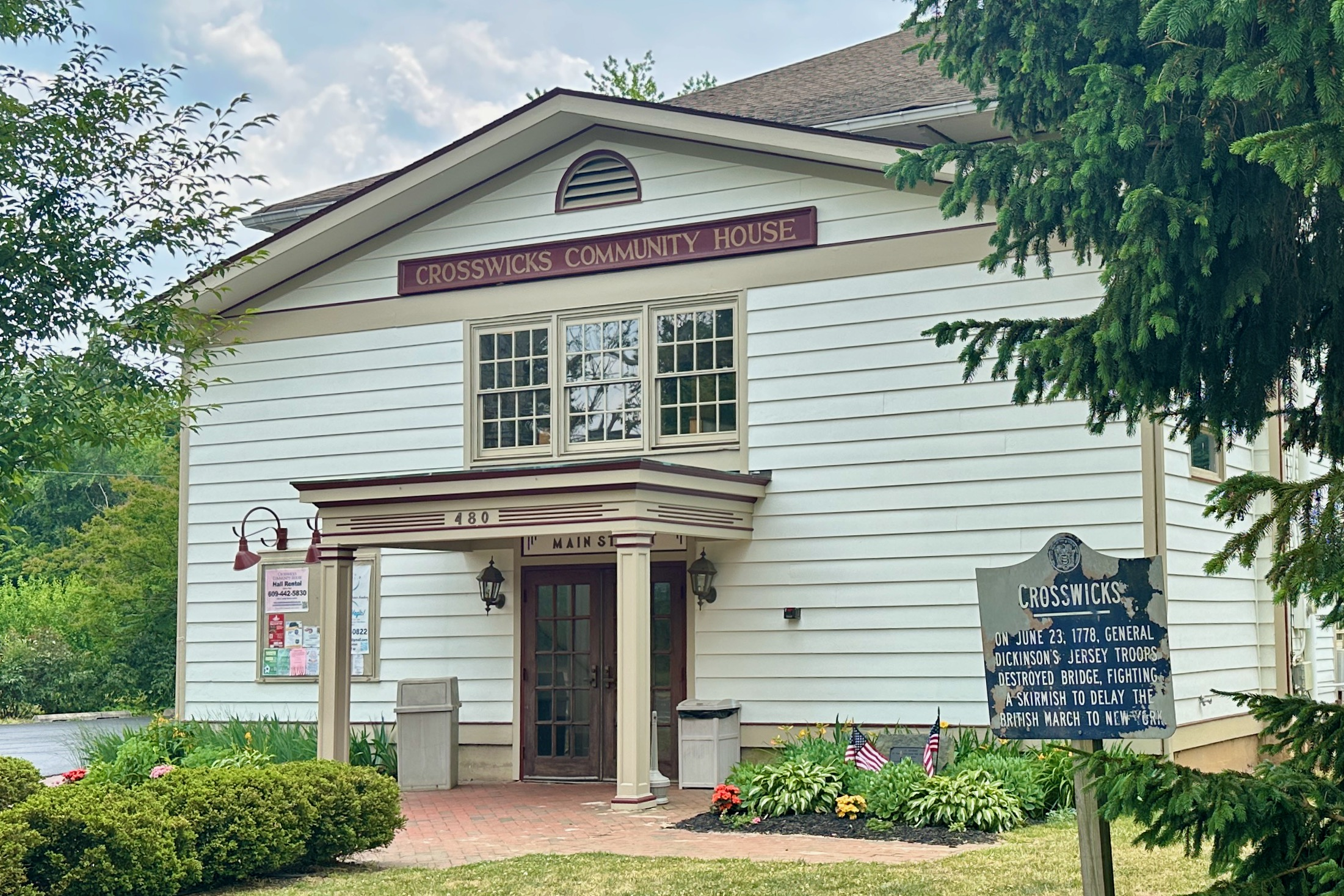
Crosswicks Community House, built 1923

== Geography ==
The community has an area of 51.98 square kilometres (20.07 sq mi) and is located on the bank of Crosswicks Creek, a tributary of the Delaware River. The community is located 9.1 kilometres (5.7 mi) from Trenton, the capital of the U.S state of New Jersey and 27 kilometres (17 mi) from Philadelphia.

== Demographics ==
Historical population
Census	Pop.	Note	%±
2020	849		—
U.S. Decennial Census; 2020

Crosswicks first appeared as a census designated place in the 2020 U.S. census. As of the 2020 United States census, the population was 849.

Crosswicks CDP, New Jersey – Racial and ethnic composition Note: the US Census treats Hispanic/Latino as an ethnic category. This table excludes Latinos from the racial categories and assigns them to a separate category. Hispanics/Latinos may be of any race.
Race / Ethnicity (NH = Non-Hispanic)	Pop 2020	2020
White alone (NH)	725	85.39%
Black or African American alone (NH)	35	4.12%
Native American or Alaska Native alone (NH)	1	0.12%
Asian alone (NH)	49	5.77%
Native Hawaiian or Pacific Islander alone (NH)	0	0.00%
Other race alone (NH)	3	0.35%
Mixed race or Multiracial (NH)	11	1.30%
Hispanic or Latino (any race)	25	2.94%
Total	849	100.00%

== Education ==
The school districts are Chesterfield Township School District (elementary) and Northern Burlington Regional School District (secondary).

== See also ==
- National Register of Historic Places listings in Burlington County, New Jersey
- List of Friends meeting houses
