= Davisville, New Jersey =

Populated place in Burlington County, New Jersey, US

- Unincorporated community
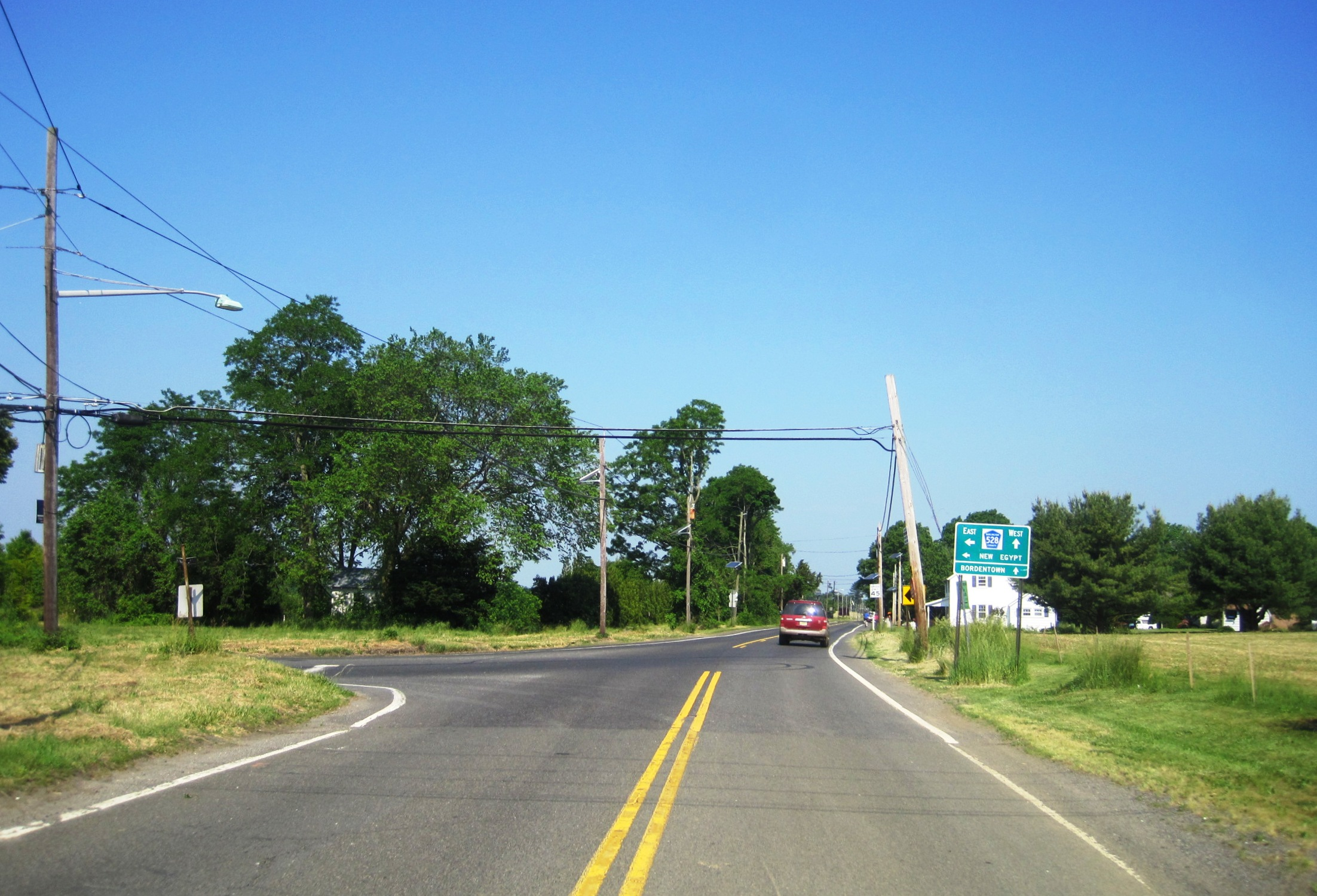
- Looking west towards CR 528 in Davisville

- Location of Davisville in Burlington County (Inset: Location of county within the state of New Jersey) Davisville (New Jersey) Davisville (the United States)
- Coordinates: 40°06′35″N 74°37′05″W
- Country: United States
- State: New Jersey
- County: Burlington
- Township: Chesterfield
- Elevation: 102 ft (31 m)
- Time zone: UTC−05:00 (Eastern (EST))
  - Summer (DST): UTC−04:00 (EDT)
- GNIS feature ID: 883070

Davisville is an unincorporated community located within Chesterfield Township in Burlington County, in the U.S. state of New Jersey. The settlement, located at the intersection of County Route 528 and Chesterfield-Arneytown Road (CR 664), is in a rural area in the eastern portion of the township. It consists mainly of farmland with some houses dotting the few roads that pass through the area.
