= Charles Newbold =

American blacksmith

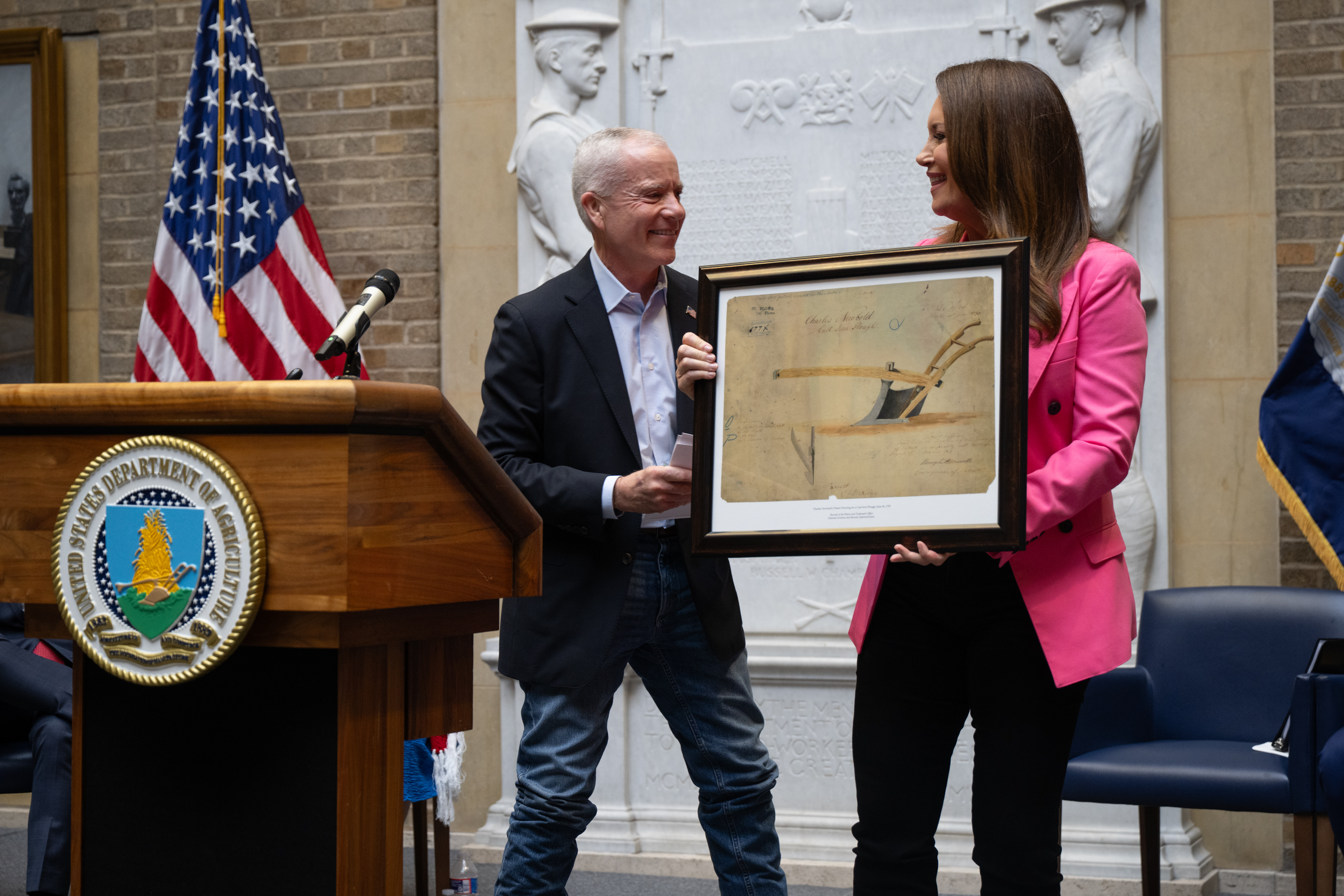
Archivist of the United States Edward Forst with Secretary of Agriculture Brooke Rollins holding Newbold's 1797 patent (2026)

Charles Newbold (1764–1835) was an American blacksmith born in Chesterfield, New Jersey. On June 26, 1797, Newbold received the first patent for a cast-iron plow. However, he was unable to sell his plow because many farmers feared that the iron in it would poison the soil.

On April 1, 1807, inventor David Peacock was issued a patent for a three-piece iron plow (Newbold's plow was cast in one piece). Newbold then sued Peacock for patent infringement and won $1500.
