= Cabo Ruivo Seaplane Base =

Former Portuguese seaplane base

Cabo Ruivo Seaplane Base Aeroporto Marítimo de Cabo Ruivo
- IATA: none; ICAO: none

Summary
- Airport type: Public
- Owner: Portuguese State
- Serves: Lisbon, Portugal
- Location: Cabo Ruivo, Lisbon
- Elevation AMSL: 0 m (0 ft)
- Coordinates: 38°45′54.50″N 09°05′41.44″W

Map
- Location within Portugal

Cabo Ruivo Seaplane Base (Portuguese: Aeroporto Marítimo de Cabo Ruivo) was an international airport for seaplanes located in the city of Lisbon, the capital of Portugal. It takes its name from the Lisbon neighbourhood of Cabo Ruivo. The airport was, especially throughout the Second World War, a major gateway and escape route for intercontinental air travel.

== History ==
In the 1930s, the Portuguese Government decided to replace the Campo Internacional de Aterragem, at Alverca, with two new airports nearer to Lisbon's city center: today's Lisbon Portela Airport and the Cabo Ruivo Seaplane Base on the Tagus River, which handled transatlantic flights operated with seaplanes. Pan Am established its provisional seaplane base in Cabo Ruivo in 1938, at the southeast edge of today's Parque das Nações. In 1942, the Portuguese Government decided to create a proper air-marine base, initially intended to be located on the same site. Eventually, it was decided to build the airport structures around the Doca dos Olivais., two miles further up the Tagus. Avenida de Berlim, a major road, was built to connect the land and sea airports.

The US intercontinental airline Pan American World Airways, which was a major promoter of the airport's construction, used the airport as a hub for its transatlantic flights until 1945.

The first scheduled commercial passenger flight, from Port Washington, landed on 29 June 1939 on the water airstrip of the Cabo Ruivo Seaplane Base. This Atlantic flight from New York to Lisbon was operated by a Boeing 314 "Dixie Clipper" of Pan American World Airways, with 22 passengers and 11 crew members on board.

During World War II, the transatlantic clippers provided an escape route for refugees from Continental Europe, taking advantage of Portugal's neutral stance in the war.

With the enormous increase in the importance of terrestrial air traffic the era of seaplanes ended and the flight operations in Cabo Ruivo were discontinued in the late 1950s. The dock was redeveloped in the context of Lisbon's 1998 World Expo. Today, the dock is at the center of the Parque das Nações, where the Lisbon Oceanarium is located.

== Accidents and incidents ==
On 22 February 1943, the Yankee Clipper seaplane of Pan American World Airways was destroyed in a crash while landing on the Tagus River. 24 of the 39 occupants were killed. In 1958, a Martin PBM-5 Mariner crashed on an outbound flight to Madeira, about an hour after taking off from Cabo Ruivo.
