= Jean Cory Beall =

American artist (1909–1978)

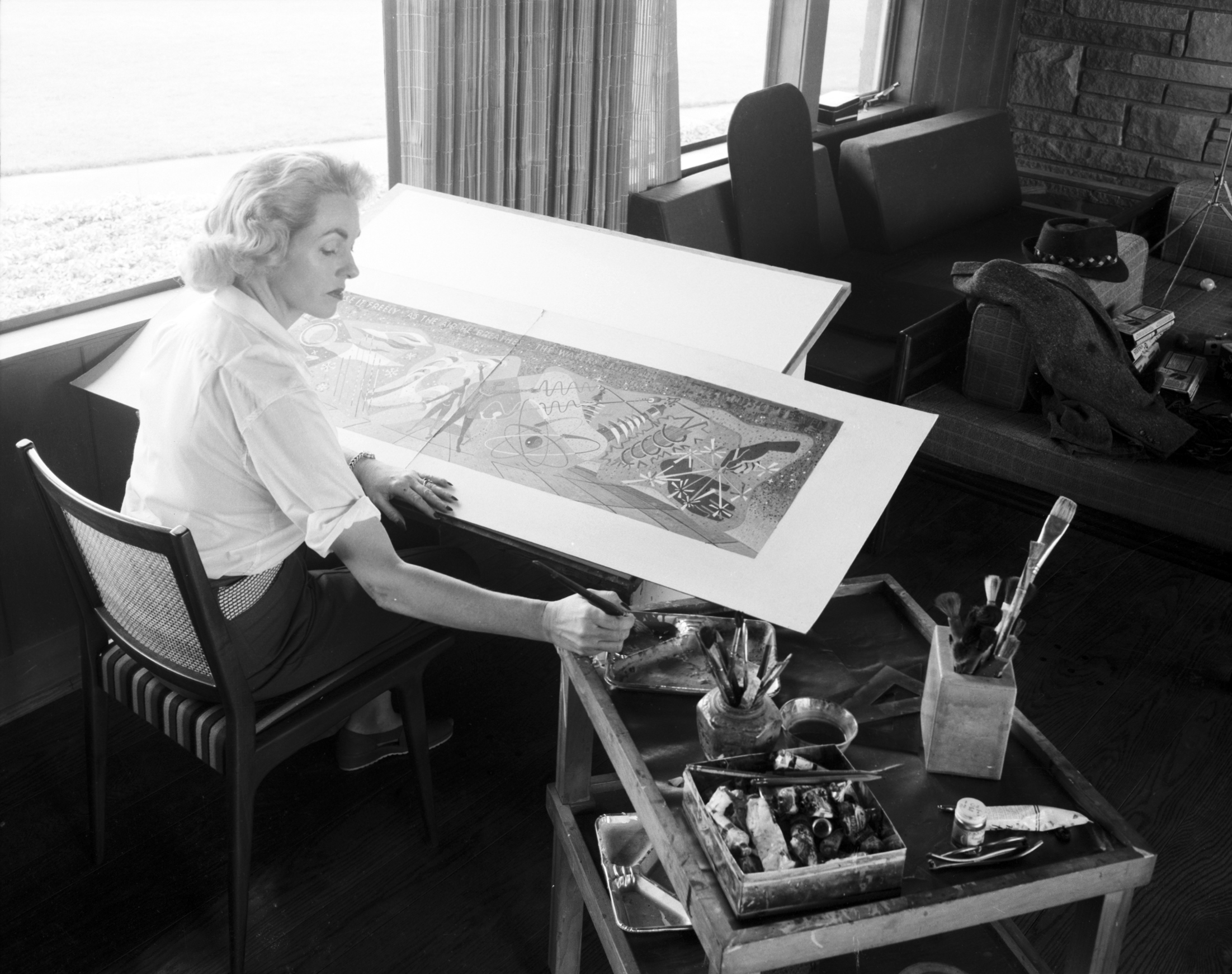
Beall designing City Light mural Water into Electricity, circa 1958

Jean Cory Beall (born Jean Susanna Cory; 23 May 1909 – 26 October 1978) was an American artist known for her large scale murals.

Beall lived and worked in Seattle where her work is part of the permanent collection of the Seattle Art Museum.

== Early life ==
Jean Susanna Cory was born in Oakland, Alameda, California on 23 May 1909. Her father was a carpenter.

Beall studied at the California College of Arts and Crafts, Parsons School of Design in Paris, France, the Institute Politecnico in Mexico City and the Art Students' League in New York City.

== Career ==
In 1936 she assisted her then husband with preparing his preliminary design proposal for the Boeing 314 flying boat by producing colour paintings of the proposed interior of the aircraft.

In 1957 Beall created Water into Electricity (That Man May Use It Freely...), a 37 foot long mosaic in glass tile for the City Light building in Seattle. The mural was moved to Seattle's Museum of History and Industry in 1996.

In 1959 she created a 10.5 foot by 29.5 foot long mural for the General Administration Building in Olympia, Washington. Created from Venetian glass tesserae, the mosaic was moved to the Washington State's Helen Sommers building next door in 2018.

Beall was a large proponent of utilizing a portion of public construction budgets to help fund art. In 1961 she was invited to serve on the State's Inaugural Arts Commission but then Governor Albert Rosellini.

== Personal life ==
In the Cathedral Church of St. Mark, Seattle, Washington State on 18 August 1934 she married aeronautical engineer Wellwood Edmeston Beall who went on to have a successful career at Boeing.

The couple had three children. The couple divorced in October 1968 in Los Angeles City, California.

In 1970 she moved to Honolulu, Hawaii. She died at the age of 69 in Honolulu, Hawaii, on 26 October 1978.
