= Honolulu Clipper =

Prototype Boeing 314 flying boat

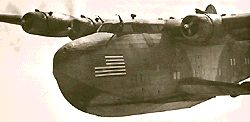
- Boeing 314 wearing Navy paint.

Accident
- Date: November 3, 1945
- Summary: Forced landing
- Site: 650 miles east of Oah'u in the Pacific Ocean; 21°9′47.60″N 147°54′17.94″W approximately

Aircraft
- Aircraft type: Boeing 314
- Operator: Pan American World Airways
- Registration: NC18601
- Flight origin: Pearl Harbor
- Destination: California
- Passengers: 26
- Crew: 11
- Fatalities: 0
- Injuries: 0
- Survivors: 37

Honolulu Clipper was the prototype Boeing 314 flying boat designed for Pan American Airways. It entered service in 1939 flying trans-Pacific routes.

Like other long range Clipper aircraft in Pan-Am it aided US military during World War II. In service with the US Navy it made a forced landing 650 miles east of Oahu on 3 November 1945 and when the subsequent salvage attempt was abandoned, the Honolulu Clipper was deliberately sunk by gunfire.

Passengers flying aboard the aircraft over its service life of 18,000 flying hours included Clare Boothe Luce, Eddie Rickenbacker, Thomas Kinkaid, Chester Nimitz, and Peter Fraser.

== Prototype ==
Pan Am initiated trans-Pacific airmail service on 22 November 1935; and began carrying passengers in October 1936. Pan Am requested Boeing to design a longer range flying boat to improve service offered by the original Martin M-130s; and Boeing completed NX18601 with the canceled Boeing XB-15 wing design and a single vertical tail fin on 1 June 1938. A twin rudder tail was substituted after the initial test pilot reported adjusting engine power was the only way to turn the aircraft; and that was subsequently replaced with the triple tail used on production aircraft. Boeing also modified the hull-step and sponsons to provide satisfactory performance during takeoff and landings.

== Service history ==
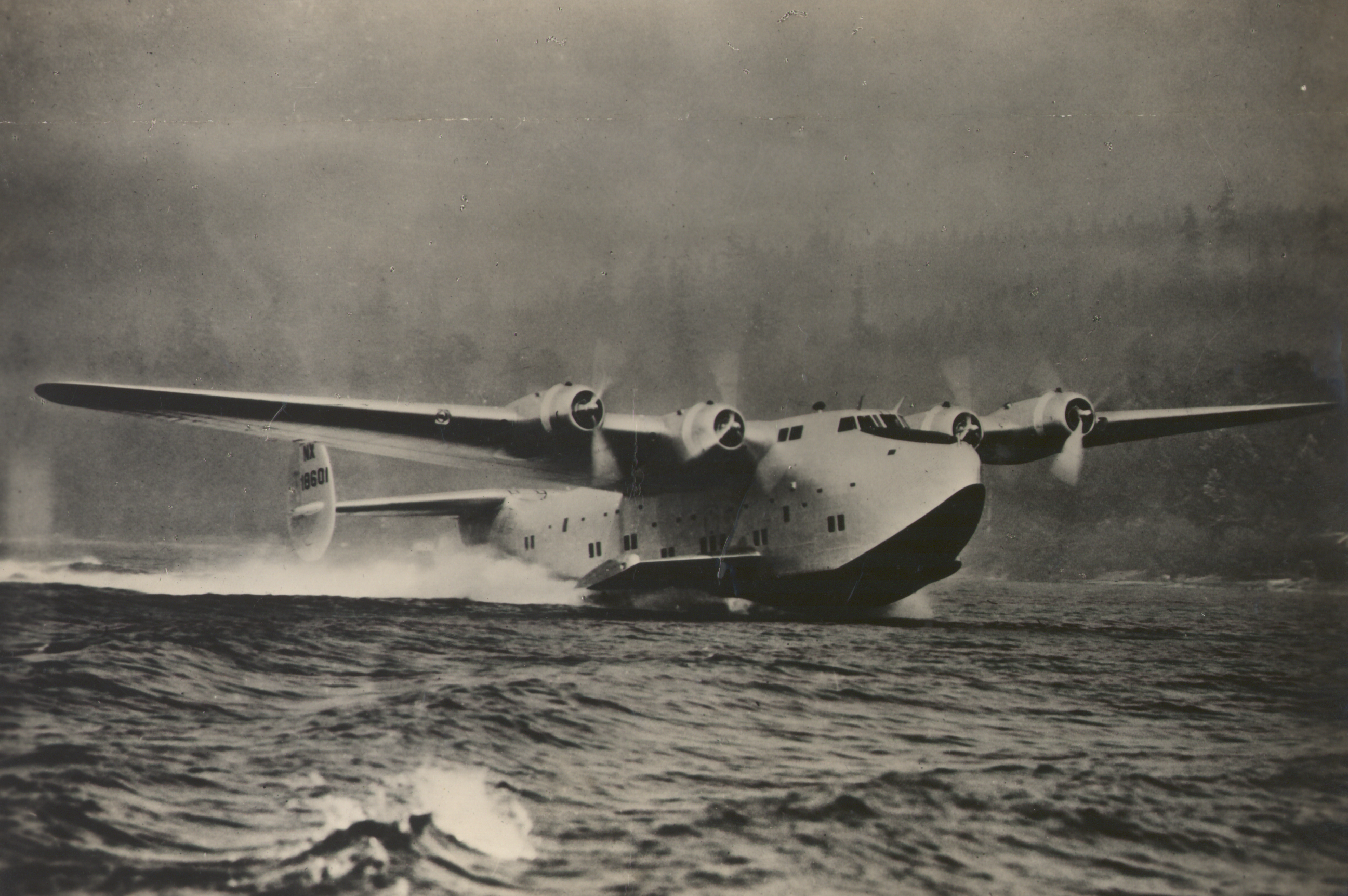
Model Honolulu Clipper, still in the experimental phase (identified as NX-18601) and which would be operated by Pan American Airways with registration NC-18601, until it crashed on November 3, 1945.

Pan Am accepted the modified prototype to replace Hawaii Clipper. The plane's first trans-Pacific flight as NC18601 began on 16 March 1939. The plane set a record at the time by carrying 45 persons, including thirty paying passengers, on the final leg of the trip from Manila to Hong Kong.

Pan Am purchased five more production Boeing 314s and three improved Boeing 314As to extend transoceanic service to the Atlantic. Pan Am hired experienced nautical navigators for oceanic flights. These men continued to fly the aircraft after the United States Navy assumed control of the Clippers in 1942. Honolulu Clipper flew between California and Hawaii and to Australia via Canton Island, Fiji, Nouméa and New Zealand after Japan gained control of the pre-war Pan Am facilities at Wake Island, Guam and Manila Bay. Pan Am crews maintained a unique line-crossing ceremony flying to New Zealand and Australia. Passengers crossing the equator for the first time provided a banknote to be endorsed by those who had made the passage before. The endorsed banknote, known as a short snorter, was returned to the initiate as a credential for future crossings.

== Loss ==
Honolulu Clipper departed Hawaii on 3 November 1945 with an Operation Magic Carpet flight carrying 26 military personnel returning to the United States after service in the Pacific. The aircraft lost power in both starboard engines after five hours of flying, and successfully landed 650 miles east of Oahu shortly before midnight. The merchant tanker Englewood Hills maintained radio contact, found the aircraft and removed the passengers on the morning of 4 November. The escort carrier Manila Bay arrived and sent over aircraft mechanics who were unable to repair the engines at sea. Manila Bay then attempted to tow the aircraft; but the tow line parted as weather deteriorated. The seaplane tender San Pablo was assigned to tow the flying boat into port. The tow proceeded slowly until 7 November when Honolulu Clipper rode down the crest of a wave and smashed into the side of San Pablo. The collision crushed the airplane's bow and sheared off the starboard wingtip. Honolulu Clipper was intentionally sunk on 14 November by perforating the hull with 1200 20mm Oerlikon shells after salvage was deemed impractical.
