= Boeing 314 Clipper =

American long-range flying boat, 1938–1951

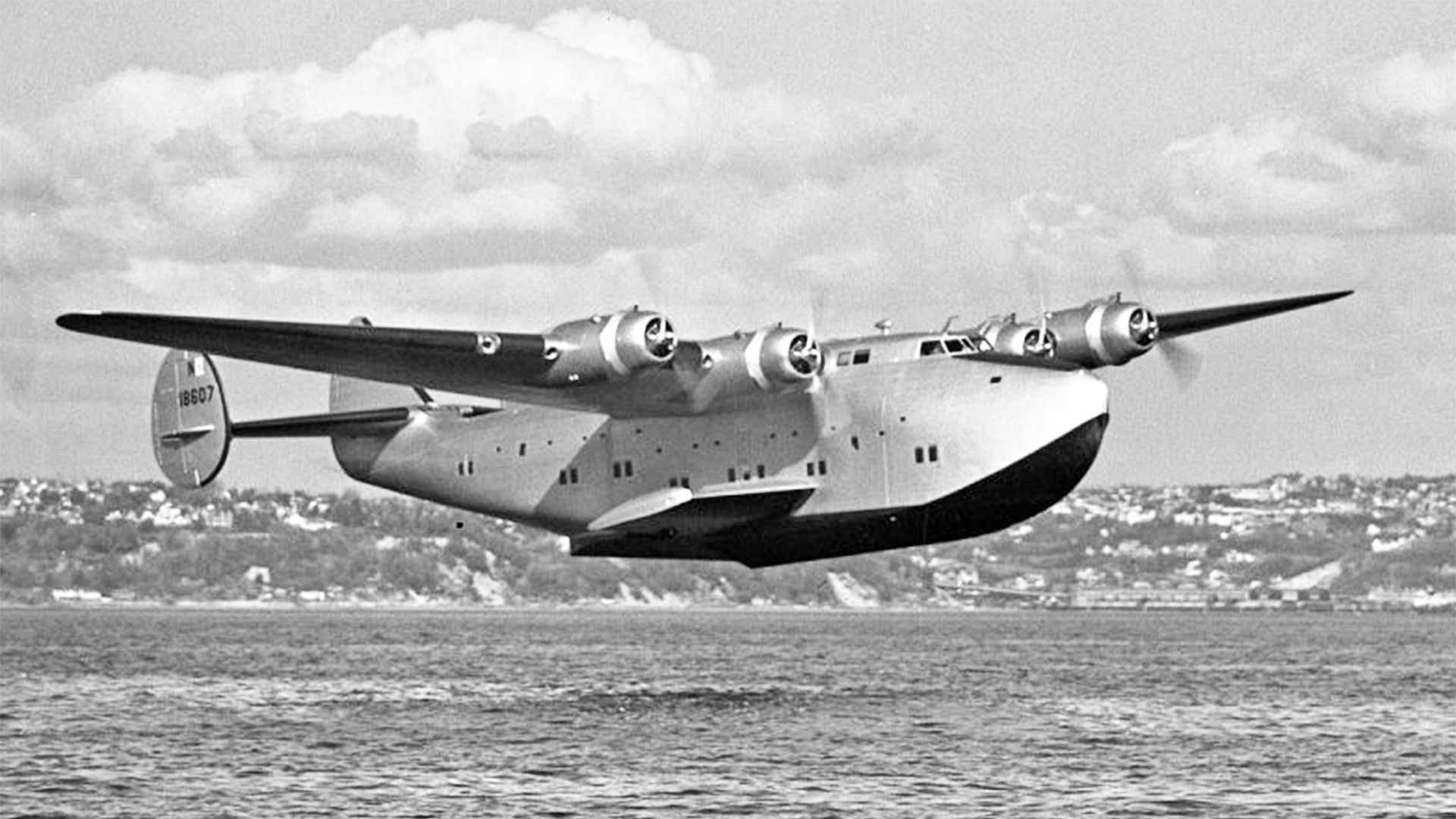
- A Boeing 314 flying low

General information
- Type: Flying boat airliner
- National origin: United States
- Manufacturer: Boeing Airplane Company
- Primary users: Pan American World Airways British Overseas Airways Corporation; United States Navy
- Number built: 12

History
- Manufactured: 1938–1941
- Introduction date: 1939 (87 years ago)
- First flight: June 7, 1938 (88 years ago)
- Retired: 1951 (75 years ago)

The Boeing 314 Clipper was an American long-range flying boat produced by Boeing from 1938 to 1941. One of the largest aircraft of its time, it had the range to cross the Atlantic and Pacific oceans. For its wing, Boeing re-used the design from the earlier XB-15 bomber prototype. Twelve Clippers were built, nine of which served with Pan Am. It was the first aircraft to carry a sitting American president, when in 1943 Franklin D. Roosevelt flew from Miami to the Casablanca Conference in Morocco, via Trinidad, Brazil, and The Gambia.

== Development ==
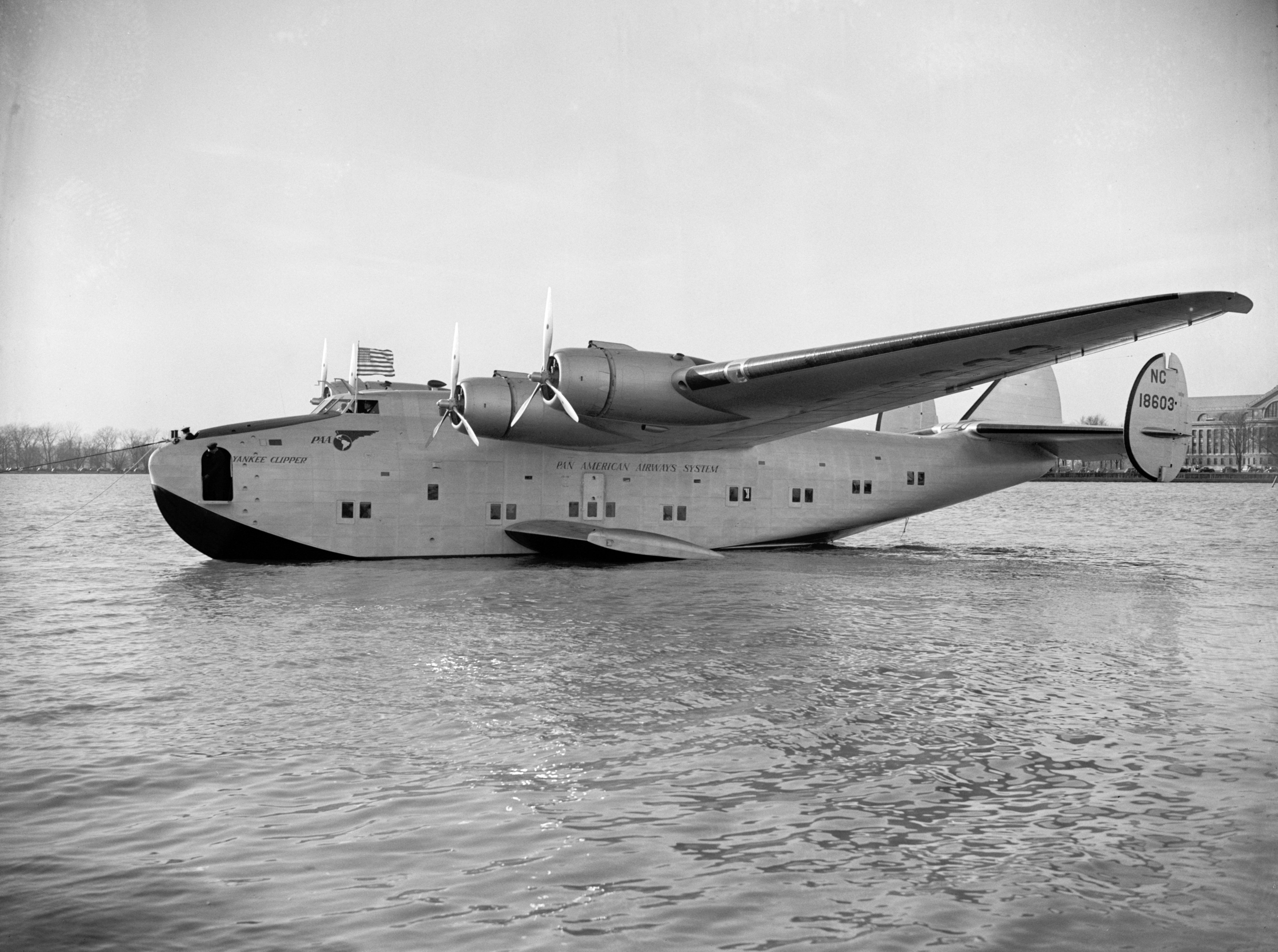
The Yankee Clipper in 1939

=== Background ===
As early as 1935 Pan American had identified that a truly trans-Pacific flying boat with unprecedented range and double the passenger payload of the airline's Martin M-130 would be required particularly if they were to provide a service across the longer more difficult Atlantic route and requested proposals from a number of American manufacturers.

In February 1936, not long after the M-130s were introduced into service, Pan American launched a design competition for the first transoceanic airliner. Boeing, Douglas, Consolidated, Martin and Sikorsky were requested to provide preliminary studies and proposals for a long-range, four engine, marine aircraft. The new plane had to be able to transport up to 10,000 pounds of payload with a minimum range of 2,400 miles and cruise speed of 150 mph at an altitude of 10,000 feet. Pan American was also adamant about providing comfort, space, and luxury for their passengers, as well as providing the ultimate in safety. Martin proposed a larger modified version of their M-130 called the M-156 which would offer a longer range and bigger payload with either a 53-day or 26 sleeper configuration. Sikorsky proposed their S-45 whose six engines promised a 52,000 lb payload, but the first aircraft would not be available until late 1939 or early 1940 and it would cost more than the other proposals.

=== Boeing’s submission ===
After receiving the Pan American request on February 28, 1936, Boeing decided not to submit a proposal. At the time, the company's resources were committed on simultaneous contracts for the United States Army Air Corps. The deadline had passed when a young Boeing engineer, Wellwood E. Beall, became aware of the Pan American project, and thought that Boeing should consider submitting a bid.

Beall had just returned to the United States in 1935 from serving as the company's Far Eastern manager with responsibility for selling the company's fighter and transport planes to the Chinese Government. During his time in China he had often thought about the design of a large flying boat and he now worked in his spare time on a preliminary design.

As Pan American had specified the engines and propellers in advance, Beall proposed to use the wing of the cancelled XB-15 bomber, which had already been designed and wind-tunnel tested; this would allow Boeing to confine the design effort to the hull and the flotation stability and tail assemblies. To supplement his preliminary design study, his then wife, well-known artist and muralist Jean Cory Beall, produced color paintings of the cabin interiors. His proposal was accepted by Boeing management, and he was given permission to request an extension from Pan American, which was granted.

Beall was transferred to the engineering department and allocated 11 engineers to work on the project. The engineering team calculated the optimum wingspan for the flying boat to be 152 ft (46 m) compared with the XB-15's 149 ft (45 m). The shortfall was overcome by adding 36 in (914 mm) to the width of the fuselage. He combined the wing with more powerful Wright R-2600 Twin Cyclone engines, each of which produced 50% more power than the 850 hp (630 kW) of the XB-15's Pratt & Whitney R-1830 Twin Wasp engines. The XB-15's engine nacelles were also retained, as they had originally been designed to house 2,600 hp (1,900 kW) Allison V-3420 liquid-cooled W engines which, since these were not ready, had been replaced on the bomber by the smaller and less powerful Pratt & Whitneys. The engineers estimated that their proposed design would weigh 40,000 lbs and could carry a payload of up to 42,500 lbs.

Sufficient work was completed by May 1936 for Beall, company president Claire Egtvedt, and aerodynamicist Ralph LaVenture Cram (1906–1939) to depart on May 9, 1936, from Seattle to New York, where they made a presentation of their proposal to Pan American.

Pan American accepted Boeing's proposal, awarding it a $4.8 million contract on July 21, 1936, for six aircraft with an option for six more. This order represented the first that Pan American had placed with the company. The first aircraft was to be delivered by December 21, 1937. An amendment to the contract on January 20, 1937, granted a three-month extension to the specified delivery date for the first six aircraft.

The aircraft's introduction was impacted by the complexity of the design and testing and the passage of the Civil Aeronautics Act in 1938, establishing the Civil Aeronautics Board, which had the power to review and certify new aircraft. Boeing missed its contracted delivery date by 13 months.

=== Testing ===
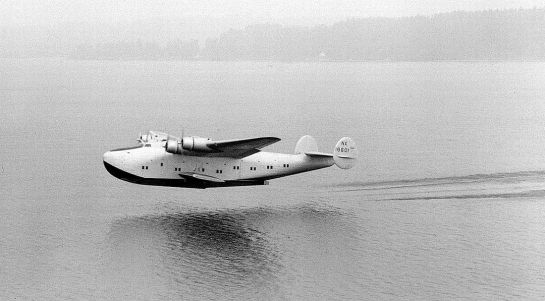
Boeing Model 314 NX18601 flying over Elliot Bay

There was no dedicated prototype; instead, the first production unit, NX-18601, was used for testing. Once completed it was launched into the Duwamish Waterway and towed to Elliott Bay on Puget Sound for taxi and flight tests. Its wingspan was so great that it had to be turned diagonally to pass through the supports of bridges spanning the waterway. From here it commenced its first taxiing run on 3 June with test pilot Edmund T. Allen at the controls, but he soon identified that it was too lightly loaded when a gust of wind lifted one wing and dipped the other and after increasing the engine power failed to correct the situation it became necessary for all spare crew members to climb out onto the raised wing to balance the aircraft and allow it to safely return to shore. Following the installation of temporary ballast further taxiing tests continued for a week.

The first test flight was undertaken by Allen on the June 7, 1938, and once airborne it was immediately identified that the aircraft had insufficient rudder control. He was only able to turn the aircraft by increasing the power of the engines on one wing and decreasing that of the engines on the other. This first flight lasted 38 minutes. This directional instability had been observed during wind tunnel tests but Boeing management had rejected any changes to the original single fin configuration to correct it. Someone else who had identified the issue was George S. Schairer, at the time a young engineer at Consolidated Aircraft. After seeing a photograph of NX-18601 with its original tail configuration on the cover of an aviation magazine he had written to Boeing, stating that he believed the tail was too small. NX-18601 was immediately modified into a twin fin configuration, but this was still found to be insufficient and so the centerline vertical fin was restored, which resolved the issue and this three fin arrangement became the production configuration.

Months of extensive testing continued and on January 26, 1939, the 314 was approved the Civil Aeronautics Board for commercial airworthiness.

== Design ==
The 314 was a high wing flying boat which used a series of heavy metal ribs and spars to create a robust fuselage and cantilevered wing, eliminating the need for external drag-inducing struts to brace the wings. It was metal skinned with the exception of the control surfaces.

The aircraft were assembled at Boeing's Plant 1 on the Duwamish River in Seattle. The design required the production of 6,000 engineering drawings, 50,000 separate parts, 11 miles of electrical wiring, 576,000 rivets and 15,200 bolts.

=== Engines ===
The original six 314s were powered by four air-cooled, supercharged Wright Aeronautical Corporation Cyclone 14 GR2600A2, two-row, 14-cylinder radial engines. The other six 314A's had the more powerful Cyclone 14 GR2600A2A engines. These engines were subsequently retrofitted to the original 314s during engine overhauls.

Commonly known as "Twin Cyclones", these engines were the first to use 100 octane gasoline in commercial service. The 314 was the first use of this engine, which at the time was not only the largest engine installed on a commercial aircraft, but also offered the lowest specific fuel consumption.

Engine Specification
Model	GR2600A2	GR2600A2A
Specification	332	579
Used in	Boeing 314	Boeing 314, 314A
Sea level rating – Take off	1,550 hp (1,160 kW) at 2,400 revs	1,600 hp (1,200 kW) at 2,400 revs
Sea level rating - Normal	1,200 hp (890 kW) at 2,100 revs	1,350 hp (1,010 kW) at 2,300 revs
Weight	1,935 pounds (878 kg)	1,935 pounds (878 kg)
Length	62.06 inches (157.6 cm)	62.06 inches (157.6 cm)
Diameter (height)	55 inches (140 cm)	55 inches (140 cm)
Reduction gear ratio	16:9	16:9
Supercharger ratio	7.4:1	7:1
Compression ratio	7.1:1	6.8:1
Fuel grade (Octane)	91/96	95

The engines drove Hamilton Standard hydromatic full-feathering constant-speed propellers through reduction gears. The development of these propellers had been fostered by Pan American. In a first for commercial operation, these offered both variable pitch and full-feathering which meant that in the event of an engine fault the three blades of the 14 feet (4.3 m) diameter propellers could be turned directly into the airflow, and so would not rotate and risk further damaging the engine by “windmilling”. Turning the blades into the airflow also reduced drag which was important on long flights over water. On the GR2600A2 engines, the propellers had a diameter of 14 feet (4.3 m), while on the GR2600A2A, they had a diameter of 14 feet 10 inches (4.52 m). When installed in 1940, they featured the first NACA propeller aerofoil sections on a commercial aircraft.

The 314 featured the first use of rate of flow fuel meters when they were installed in 1939 at the engineer's station as a permanent fitting on an aircraft. Previously they had been only installed as a temporary device during testing. Pan American had supported their development.

==== Fuel capacity ====
To fly the long ranges needed for trans-Pacific service, the 314 carried 4,246 US gallons (16,070 L; 3,536 imp gal) of gasoline. The later 314A model carried a further 1,200 US gallons (4,500 L; 1,000 imp gal). A capacity of 300 US gallons (1,100 L; 250 imp gal) of oil was required for operation of the radial engines.

=== Wings ===
The wings were constructed in five sections of an aluminum outer skin formed over spars constructed out of bolted square aluminum alloy tube trusses while the ribs were formed out of aluminum alloy tubes and channels. They had a NACA 0018 airfoil profile at their root which changed to a NACA 0010 profile at their tip. The outer ends of the wings were made watertight, which allowed them to provide flotation if the aircraft heeled over in rough conditions.

The wings were thick enough to incorporate a crawlspace, through which each engine nacelle could be accessed by a flight engineer. After removing the two sections of the stainless-steel firewall behind each engine, they could service and if possible repair it in flight, as the fully-feathering propellers made it possible for an engine to be completely shut down. Between June 1939 and June 1941, 431 in-flight engine repairs were performed. The most common problem was fouled spark plugs.

Each nacelle had a side access door on either side which opened downwards and which could be used as work platforms. Each aircraft also carried portable work platforms that could be hung on the outside, forward of the access doors to allow work on the engines. The center sections of each wing contained two fuel tanks as well as compartments for transport of cargo, in particular mail.

The wings were fitted with metal-framed fabric-covered "split" type flaps located under each wings trailing edge. When taking off the flaps were set to 20 degrees and when landing their full deflection of 60 degrees was typically used. The metal-framed fabric-covered ailerons were of the Frieze type, each having a single trim tab divided into two separate units to reduce any binding of the aileron's hinge when the wing flexed under load.

=== Hull ===
The 12 feet 6 inches (3.81 m) wide hull was of all metal construction and differed from previous flying boats in that the lower central section was constructed as an integral section with the wings and inner engine nacelles. The remaining parts of the hull were separately constructed in sections and then attached to it. Instead of the hull being split into numerous watertight compartments the hull had only two full height watertight bulkheads, a front collision bulkhead ahead of the flight deck and a compartmented double bottom.

The 314 had a transverse hydroplane step just to the rear of the center of gravity with a second step, farther aft which terminated on the original 314's at a rudder for steering the flying boat when it was in the water. This rudder was subsequently removed and was not fitted to the 314As as it was found in service that the aircraft could be steered in the water by varying the power to the engines on each side.

The lower mid hull of the 314 was fitted with Dornier-style sponsons. These sponsons, broad lateral extensions at the waterline on both sides of the hull, served several purposes: They provided a wide platform to stabilize the craft while on the water, they acted as a platform for boarding and exiting, and they possessed an intentional air foil shape which contributed additional aerodynamic lift in flight. Each was divided into five compartments, two of which were used as fuel tanks. Each sponson had sufficient reserve buoyancy to maintain stability if one of the compartments filled with water. The fuselage drew 4 feet (1.2 m) of water.

The tail section consisted of a metal-skinned horizontal stabilizer; the centre was a single central metal-frame fabric covered fin and on each outboard end was attached a metal-skinned fully cantilevered fin. The metal skinned stabilizer was built as a single unit and was bolted directly to the top of the hull with a streamline fairing for it. The metal-frame fabric-covered elevators fitted to on each end of the stabilizer were so large and heavy that in a first they were fitted with separate control and trim tabs on each side. The control tab had twice the effectiveness of the trim tab. Springs, which gave a degree of "feel" proportional to elevator movement were incorporated in the connections to the pilot's controls moved the tabs, which in turn moved the elevators. At high angles of movement, the spring became rigid and further elevator movement was directly from the control column. While not aerodynamically balanced, the elevators were statically balanced to 85% by a counterweight in the hull and by smaller weights on their outboard ends. The metal-frame fabric covered rudders used the same spring-controlled tab system as the elevators, and incorporated a small degree of aerodynamic balance.

=== Interior ===
At the front was a bow compartment containing a 91 pounds (41 kg) anchor and 150 feet (46 m) of rope for tie off the aircraft. Access was via a hatch on each side of the nose, while a smaller top hatch allowed a crewman to attach either a towing line, mooring line or anchor line to two removable vertical mooring posts. From this compartment a gangway led up to the cockpit on the upper deck. At the rear of the compartment there were four tube and canvas bunks for the crew that folded up into the walls of the collision bulkhead.

Behind it were two decks, an upper and a lower deck.

==== Upper deck ====
On the upper deck was the flight deck, cargo hold, crew quarters, a toilet and baggage compartments. On the roof of the flight deck were two pitot tubes and a retractable spotlight.

The large flight deck was 21 feet 4 inches (6.50 m) long and 9 feet 6 inches (2.90 m) wide with full headroom throughout. At the front was the cockpit. The captain sat in the left and the co-pilot to the right. Between the pilots was a hatch leading down into the bow compartment. Behind the cockpit (which could be closed off by heavy curtains at night to prevent light from the rest of the flight deck reducing the pilot's night vision) was the flight operations room. On the left-hand side of the flight operations room was the navigator's 7 feet (2.1 m) long chart table, followed by a small table and chair for the watch officer. On the right side was a circular staircase that led down to the lower deck. Behind this was the radio operator's station, followed by the flight engineer's station.

On either side of the flight operations room were oval hatches that led to the crawl spaces in the respective wings. On the rear bulkhead was the door to the cargo hold located in the center of the wing over the center of gravity. The heaviest cargo was stored here, with space left for the crew to pass through. Outside access to the cargo compartment was via a hatch in the top of the wing, the hatch also incorporating a celestial observation dome. The navigator used this dome to make sightings on the stars with a sextant. The dome's location at the 314's center of gravity assisted in making these sightings as steady as possible, while the red light in this compartment allowed reading of the sextant without impacting on the navigator's night vision. If clouds prevented a reading then a straight course could be maintained by employing dead reckoning. To compensate for wind blowing the aircraft sideways the drift could be estimated by dropping a flare into the water through a small hatch in each wing root. By carefully watching the flare to see if it stayed in line with the tail of the aircraft or moved to one side or the other, the navigator could estimate the drift.

Behind the cargo compartment was the crew quarters where the crew had the use of three tube and canvas bunks on which to sleep. Behind the upper deck's crew quarters was an area for storage of the passengers' luggage.

==== Passenger deck ====
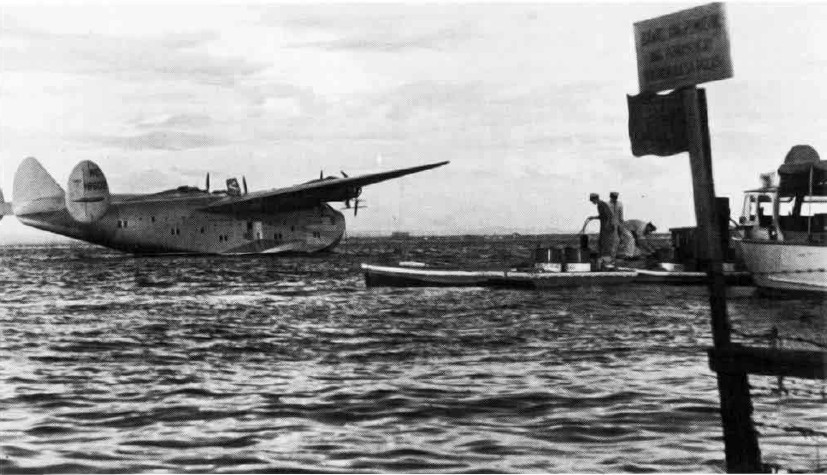
The California Clipper at Cavite, the Philippines, 1940

The lower deck was divided into eleven sections: five standard passenger compartments, a deluxe compartment, a dining lounge, gallery, ladies' restroom and men's room. The aft compartments had a step between each as their floor level rose due to the curvature of the bottom of the aircraft.

Each standard compartment could seat ten or sleep six, with four sleeping on the right (starboard) side in two upper and lower berths, while on the left (port) side there was a single upper and lower, each fitted with a privacy curtain. It took a steward 30 minutes to convert each compartment into its sleeping configuration.

The deluxe compartment, which was also known as the "bridal suite", was located at the extreme rear of the deck, and contained a three-cushion davenport that could be converted into upper and lower sleeping berths. Also, there was a loveseat, a coffee table, a small leather covered dressing and writing table, a beige stool, a mirror, a wardrobe and a concealed wash basin.

The ladies' restroom contained a mirror, a sink with hot and cold running water, towels, tissues, two leather upholstered swivel stools and, behind a door, a separate toilet. The men's room had an outlet for an electric razor, while its attached toilet room had both a toilet and a urinal. Water for flushing of the toilets was from an overhead tank, with all waste flushed overboard.

The dining lounge had seating for 11 passengers during daytime with small pullout tables on which to accommodate their drinks and snacks. In the evening the furniture converted into a formal dining configuration which could seat 14 passengers at five tables, with meals served with linen tablecloths, crystal glasses, and full waiter service. Two drinking fountains were provided on each aircraft.

The 4 feet (1.2 m) square galley had a linoleum covered floor, a 12-inch (300 mm) by 10-inch (250 mm) aluminum sink, a drip coffee maker, an aluminum icebox, a combination stove and steamer, a cabinet containing a two-tiered dish rack capable of accommodating 200 fine China plates, two glass and cup racks, a saucer rack, eight drawers and a waste bin. A separate cabinet held 350 Gorham sterling-silver "Moderen" pattern cutlery, a silver-plated tea set, and ten pairs of sterling salt and pepper shakers. There were approximately 1,000 serving items, which weighed a total of 235 pounds (107 kg), with typically 256 pounds (116 kg) of food carried. Valuables and passenger passports were housed in one of three lockable cabinets.

Norman Bel Geddes, who had designed the interior of Pan American's Martin M-130, was employed to design the interior of the 314. Wherever possible, efforts were made to reduce weight. Duralumin was used in the furniture frames, and plastic in the portholes rather than glass. Lightweight carpet was used to assist in noise damping. The cushions were made of latex mixed with horsehair from Australia. Howard Ketcham, a color expert from New York assisted in the selection of colors that would complement Bel Geddes’ design and also reflect light, yet control brightness and create the impression of openness to reduce any feelings of claustrophobia. This resulted in the use of colors called Miami Sand Beige, Pan American Blue and Skyline Green. Window blinds were of an accordion pleated roller design, and manufactured by Claude D. Carver Company of New York that used a washable material called "Tontine".

=== Auxiliary equipment ===
The aircraft's electrical system was of the direct current type, powered by two 15 volt generators supported by two 12 volt batteries to provide both 12 volts and 24 volts. The 314 had an extensive suite of radio equipment, which was housed in three different locations. Normally powered by the main electrical system it could in the event of a loss of this supply be powered from a self-contained emergency generator. The radio equipment as well as other specialised equipment was provided by Pan American, with their staff at the Boeing's factory assisting in its installation and commissioning. The aircraft was fitted with a heating and cooling system that could deliver 360,000 BTUs per hour from manifolds around engine exhausts and 170,000 cubic feet of air per hour. The aircraft was fitted with a system that could detect any leakage of carbon monoxide from the engines into the interior of the aircraft.

=== Safety features ===
The aircraft had 15 different methods of exiting the aircraft in an emergency, with each passenger compartment having two. With the exception of the fuel tank hatches, all hatches on the aircraft could be opened without threatening the structural integrity of the aircraft. Emergency equipment was stored in the nose compartment including at least two weeks of canned food for all the passengers, stored water, life rafts, and fishing and hunting tackle. Each passenger seat had a lifejacket, with the aircraft equipped with axes, flares, ring-type life preservers and rope. There were also eight 10-person life rafts, four of which could be accessed from outside of the aircraft. To reduce the risk of fire Boeing made efforts wherever possible to use fireproof materials in the cabins, most notably in the insulation, upholstery and wall linings.

=== Service levels ===
Pan American's "Clippers" were built for "one-class" luxury air travel, a necessity given the long duration of transoceanic flights. In 1940, Pan American's scheduled time from San Francisco to Honolulu was 19 hours, with a cruising speed of 188 miles per hour (303 km/h), although flights at maximum gross weight were typically flown at 155 miles per hour (249 km/h). Clipper service catered to elite businessmen and the wealthy traveler. The 314s had a lounge and dining area, and the galleys were crewed by chefs from four-star hotels. Men and women were provided with separate dressing rooms, and white-coated stewards served five and six-course meals with gleaming silver service. The seats could be converted into 36 bunks for overnight accommodation. The standard of luxury on Pan American's Boeing 314s has rarely been matched on heavier-than-air transport since then. A round trip from New York to Southampton was $675 (equivalent to $15,000 in 2025), while a one-way ticket from San Francisco to Hong Kong via the "stepping-stone" islands cost $760 (equivalent to $17,000 in 2025). The Pan American Boeing 314 Clippers brought exotic destinations like the Far East within reach of air travelers and came to represent the romance of flight. Most of the flights were transpacific, while transatlantic flights to neutral Lisbon and Ireland continued after war broke out in Europe in September 1939, but military passengers and cargoes necessarily got priority, and the service was more spartan.

=== Crew ===
Equally critical to the 314's success was the proficiency of its Pan American flight crews, who were extremely skilled at long-distance, over-water flight operations and navigation. For training, many of the transpacific flights carried a second crew. Only the very best and most experienced flight crews were assigned Boeing 314 flying boat duty. Before coming aboard, all Pan American captains as well as first and second officers had thousands of hours of flight time in other seaplanes and flying boats. Rigorous training in dead reckoning, timed turns, judging drift from sea current, celestial navigation, and radio navigation were conducted. In conditions of poor or no visibility, pilots sometimes made successful landings at fogged-in harbors by landing out to sea, then taxiing the 314 into port.

The 314 normally had a crew of 10 but to address crew fatigue on long ocean flights the aircraft this could increase up to 16, divided into two shifts with a shift consisting of a pilot, co-pilot, navigator, radio operator, flight engineer, watch officer (also known as the "Master") and two stewards. The stewards were always men as their work on board was considered too strenuous for women, given that bunks had to be configured for overnight flights and that in an emergency they had to be able to handle heavy large-capacity life rafts.

=== Maintenance ===
Major maintenance and repairs were undertaken by manoeuvring the flying boat onto a 20-ton beaching cradle and pulling it up a ramp onto land and into a hangar. When overhauls were required, two three-story high 15-ton working platforms were wheeled into position, one for each wing, to allow access to all parts of the aircraft. Taking a year to design they each cost $10,000 and provided 2,000 square feet (190 m^{2}) of working area equipped with work benches, telephones, compressed air, electricity supplies, floodlights, spare parts and on the lowest level, offices for the foreman and inspectors. At the end of the overhaul the aircraft would be subjected to a four-hour test flight. A 314 would typically spend two days between flights on an overhaul, which involved washing the aircraft, inspection, maintenance and repair. Replacement of an engine took four hours. A replacement sponson cost $24,000.

Pan American's major maintenance facilities were located at La Guardia, New York and on Treasure Island in San Francisco Bay, California.

== Operational history ==
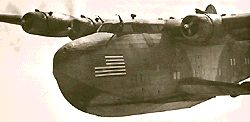
Boeing 314 in US Navy colors, c. 1942

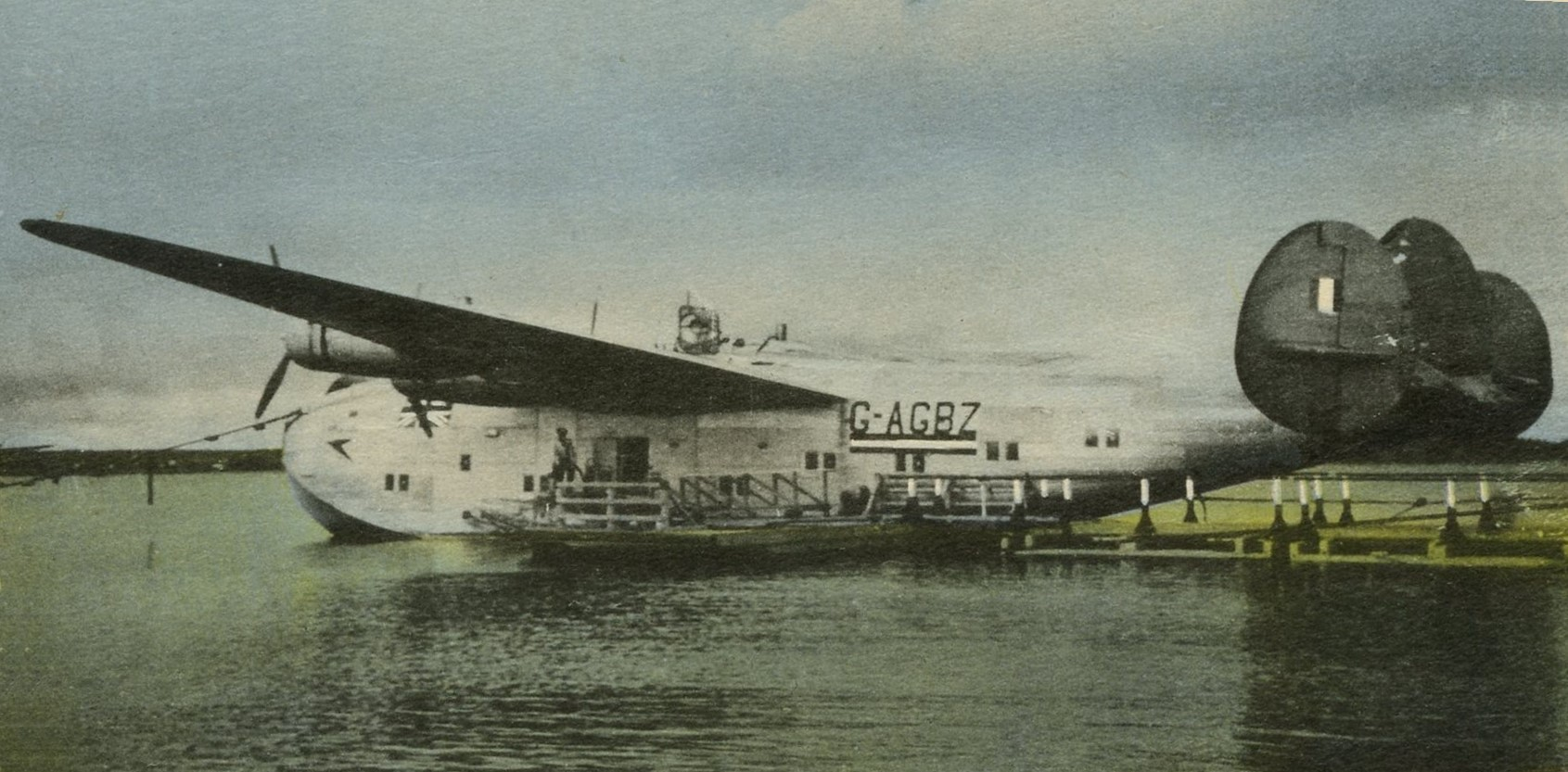
Boeing 314 Clipper in Shediac Bay, c. 1941

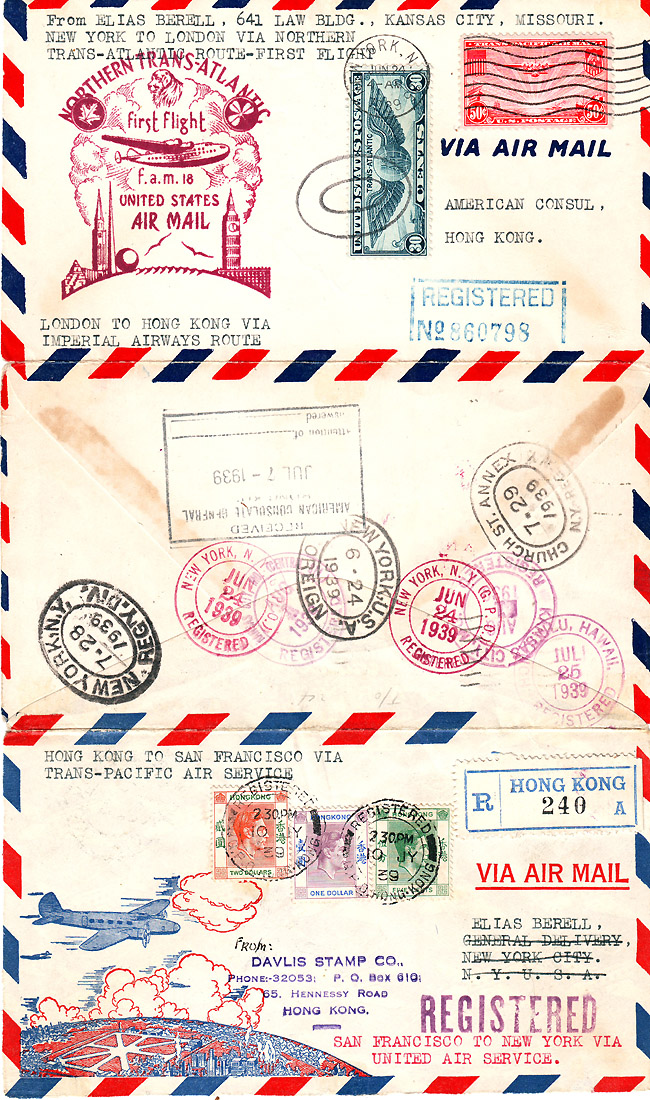
Flown "triptych" cover carried around the world on PAA Boeing 314 Clippers and Imperial Airways Short S23 flying boats June 24 – July 28, 1939

=== Entry into service ===
The first aircraft to be delivered was NC18602 which was christened California Clipper. This aircraft was flown on January 27, 1939, by Boeing test pilot Earl Ferguson and Wellwood Bell as co-pilot from Lake Washington to Astoria in Oregon. It was delivered to Pan American in Oregon in order to avoid a Washington state tax, which had been introduced during the Depression to increase state revenues. It was accepted by Captains Harold E. Gray and Charles Vaughn and flown by them to Pan American's base at San Francisco. The remaining five aircraft were delivered at approximately monthly intervals, the last on June 16, 1939.

California Clipper and the former NX-18601, which was christened Honolulu Clipper were assigned to the Pacific and the other four to the Atlantic.

As with all new designs there were a number of issues which required modifications to the aircraft. As a result, it wasn't until the end of July 1939 before the 314s were able to offer a full service on the Pacific routes.

The California Clipper inaugurated the first 314 flight on the San Francisco-Hong Kong route when it departed Alameda on February 23, 1939, arriving in Hong Kong on March 3, after stops in Hawaii, Midway Island, Wake Island, Guam Island, Manila, and Macao on what was 18,000 mile round trip route. On March 29, the California Clipper commenced a regular passenger and mail service on the same route. A one-way trip on this route took over six days to complete. Commercial passenger service lasted less than three years, ending when the United States entered World War II in December 1941. Passengers and their baggage were weighed, with each passenger allowed up to 77 pounds (35 kg) free baggage allowance (in the later 314 series) but then charged $3.25 per pound ($7.2/kg) (equivalent to $74 in 2025) for exceeding the limit.

The Yankee Clipper flew across the Atlantic on a route from Southampton to Port Washington, New York with intermediate stops at Foynes, Ireland, Botwood, Newfoundland, and Shediac, New Brunswick. The inaugural trip occurred on June 24, 1939.

=== Introduction of the 314A ===
Pan American had an option to purchase further 314s. Confident that the problems that had occurred with the first order had been resolved, and having found the 314 to be more reliable in service than the Martin M-130, they exercised this option, ordering six. The order was placed two days before its expiry date of 1 October 1939. Planned delivery was in 1941, with the goal of doubling the service on both Atlantic and Pacific routes by retiring its remaining two Martin 130s, and allocating six of the 314s to the Pacific and the other six to the Atlantic.

However, the fall of France in 1940 caused some doubt about whether the Atlantic service could continue; passenger numbers were already reduced by the war, and if Spain or Portugal were to join the Axis, then the flights to Lisbon would be forced to stop. Pan American began to consider reducing its order and, in August 1940, reached an agreement to sell two of the six under construction to the United Kingdom for $1,035,400 each with an option to purchase a third if Pan American stopped its Lisbon service. This option for a third aircraft was soon exercised. The purchase of the three aircraft included 12 spare GR2600A2A engines at a cost of $16,753 each and $21,750 for 19 Hamilton propellers. The aircraft were to be operated by the British Overseas Airways Corporation (BOAC) and were primarily intended for the UK–West Africa route, as existing flying boats could not travel this route without stopping in Lisbon. The sale made a small net profit for Pan American – priced at cost plus 5% – and provided a vital communications link for Britain, but was politically controversial. In order to arrange the sale, the junior minister Harold Balfour had to agree to the contract with no government approval, leading to stern disapproval from Winston Churchill and lengthy debate by the Cabinet over the propriety of the purchase.

Pan American provided training for BOAC staff and delivered the aircraft to La Guardia in New York, where 33 days were spent changing their registration and painting them in a new color scheme.

Churchill later flew on the Bristol and Berwick in January 1942 from Washington, D.C. to England, and he praised the plane intensely, adding to the Clippers' fame during the war.

At the outbreak of the war in the Pacific in December 1941, the Pacific Clipper was en route to New Zealand from San Francisco. Rather than risk flying back to Honolulu and being shot down by Japanese fighters, it was directed to fly west to New York City. Starting on December 8, 1941, at Auckland, New Zealand, the Pacific Clipper covered over 31,500 mi (50,700 km) via locations including Surabaya, Karachi, Bahrain, Khartoum and Leopoldville. The Pacific Clipper landed at Pan American's LaGuardia Field seaplane base at 7:12 on the morning of January 6, 1942.

=== Wartime service ===
Following the entry of the United States into World War II in December 1941, Pan American's fleet of 314s was requisitioned on December 14, 1941, by the American War Department, who assigned them to the United States Army and Navy. The aircraft were then leased back to Pan American for a dollar, with the understanding that all would be operated by the Navy once four-engined replacements for the Army's four Clippers were in service. Only the markings on the aircraft changed. Since the Pan American's civilian personnel had both extensive expertise in using flying boats for extreme long-distance over-water flights and in maintaining them, they continued to be flown and maintained by the company.

The Army gave the aircraft the designation C-98, but the Navy—which used a different designation system at the time—disregarded this designation and operated the aircraft under the company designation B-314.

Throughout the war the flying boats were employed to transport high-priority passengers (such as high-ranking officers, scientists, war correspondents and USO entertainers), mail and vital military cargo on long distance international routes to the European and Pacific fronts, and to Africa. On outbound flights, the cargo could be as important as vital blood plasma, medical supplies, while on the return they could be vital materials such as beryllium, mica, and raw rubber. The 314 was then the only aircraft in the world that could make the 2,150-mile (3,460 km) crossing over the South Atlantic. This allowed passengers and military cargo to be carried via Natal, Brazil to Liberia, to connect with the British forces in Egypt and even the Soviets, via the Persian Corridor.

In February 1942, forty women were hired by Pan American to replace male mechanics in the hangars at LaGuardia to perform service, repair and overhaul of the Clippers for the European service. Maintenance demands were such that it took "141 mechanics, working three 8-hour shifts, to perform in two days the complete inspection of servicing routine which must be carried out before a Clipper just in from Europe can be sent on the return trip." In January 1943, President Franklin D. Roosevelt traveled most of the way to and from the Casablanca Conference in a Pan-Am crewed Dixie Clipper.

While attempting to land at Cabo Ruivo Seaplane Base, in Lisbon, Portugal on February 22, 1943, the Yankee Clipper NC18603 crashed killing 24 passengers and crew. Among that flight's passengers were prominent American author and war correspondent Benjamin Robertson, who was killed, and the American singer and actress Jane Froman, who was seriously injured.

From the time of America's entry into World War II in December 1941 through to October 31, 1944, the Pan American 314s flew 9.9 million miles during which they carried 72,621 passengers completing 1,299 flights over the Pacific and 1,595 crossings of the Atlantic.

=== Immediate post war ===
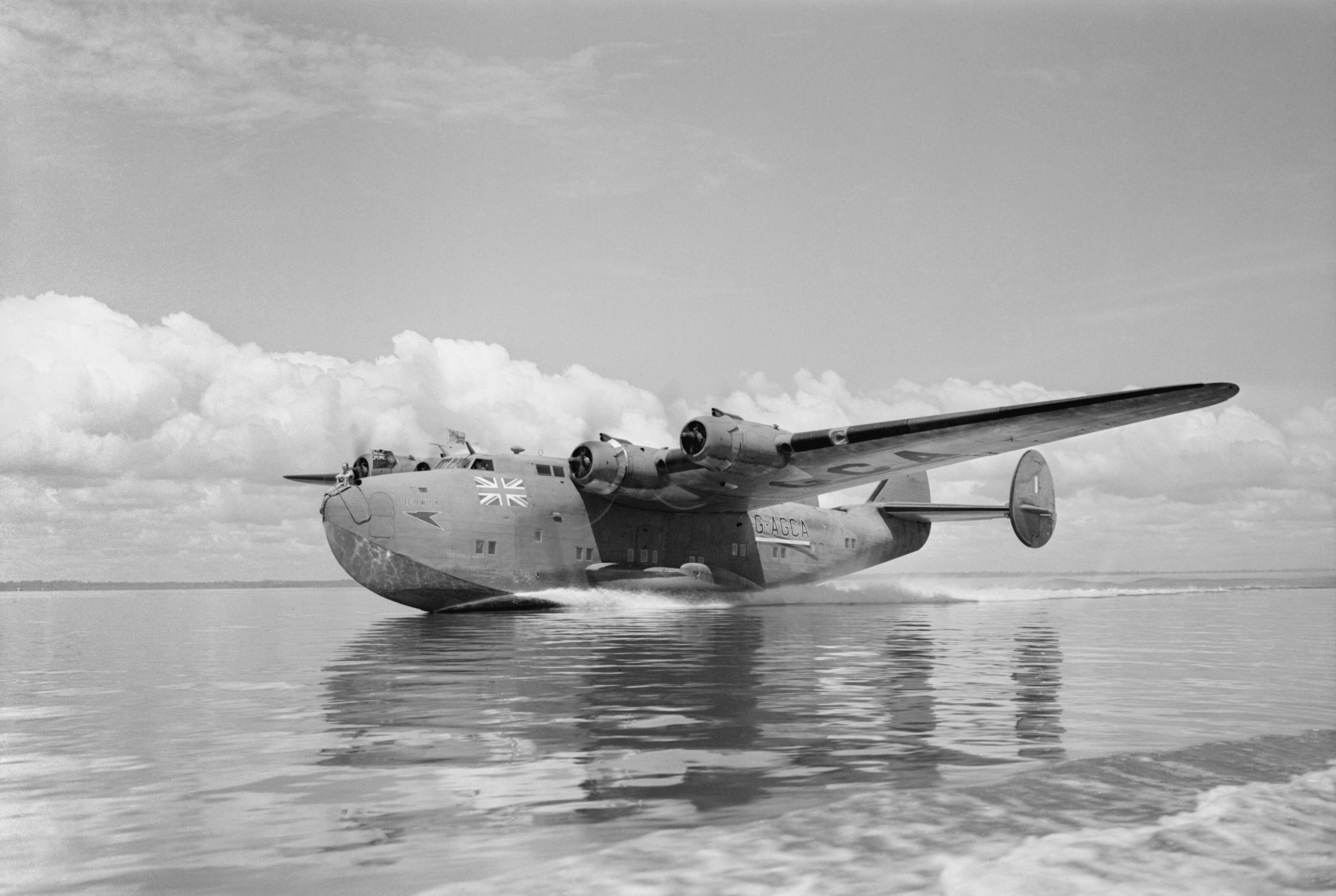
BOAC Clipper Berwick taxiing on Lagos Lagoon, Lagos, Nigeria.

Following the end of the war, the Clippers, though still owned by the American government, were used by Pan American to transport civilian passengers up until their last scheduled service on April 8–9, 1946, when the American Clipper NC18602 flew from Honolulu to San Francisco. The Clipper had carried 24 passengers and taken 16 hours and 39 minutes, compared with a Lockheed L-049 on that same day transporting 42 passengers, and taking nine hours and nine minutes to cover the same route. The last Pan American 314 to be retired, the American Clipper had accumulated more than a million flight miles by 1946. The Clippers were then offered to Pan American by the War Assets Administration (WAA) at an asking price of $50,000 each.

By this point, the 314s operated by Pan American had each accumulated more than 18,000 flight hours, and together had completed approximately 5,000 ocean crossings and flown more than 12.5 million miles. However, even before hostilities had ended, the 314 had become obsolete, which was recognised by Pan American, and they declined to take up the option to purchase them. The flying boat's advantage had been that it did not require long concrete runways, but during the war many such runways had been built for heavy bombers. New long-range airliners such as the Lockheed Constellation and Douglas DC-4 were not only faster but relatively easy to fly, and did not require the extensive pilot training programs mandated for flying boat operations. One of the 314's most experienced pilots said, "We were indeed glad to change to DC-4s, and I argued daily for eliminating all flying boats. The landplanes were much safer. No one in the operations department... had any idea of the hazards of flying boat operations. The main problem now was lack of the very high level of experience and competence required of seaplane pilots."

Of the 12 Boeing 314 Clippers built, three were lost to accidents, although only one of those resulted in fatalities, the loss of Yankee Clipper. After being taken out of service Anzac Clipper, Atlantic Clipper, Capetown Clipper and Pacific Clipper were stored at Floyd Bennett Field in Brooklyn and were advertised for sale by the WAA at the end of January 1946. California Clipper and Dixie Clipper were stored at Alameda near San Francisco and were soon joined by American Clipper and Atlantic Clipper, with these four also being offered for sale in April 1946. All seven were offered for sale with a large quantity of spare parts, including engines, instruments and servicing equipment.”

The four Alameda-stored aircraft were flown south to the milder weather conditions of San Diego which would reduce the deterioration from corrosion. Initially they were anchored in the bay; once their beaching cradles arrived, they were moved out of the water onto the seaplane ramp at the Convair facility at Lindbergh Field in San Diego.

=== Universal Airlines ===
All seven WAA owned aircraft were purchased for $325,000 by Universal Airlines, a non-scheduled carrier and mortgaged to the brokerage firm General Phoenix Corporation of Baltimore. By the time of the sale, the wing tip of the Pacific Clipper had been badly damaged in a windstorm; as it was unflyable, it was intended that it would be used for parts. At the time, the airline was flying passengers and cargo between New York City, Miami and San Juan, Puerto Rico. Within a year the airline was in financial trouble, and was declared bankrupt on May 28, 1947.

With the Pacific Clipper by now broken down into parts the six remaining aircraft were purchased in a bankruptcy auction in 1947 by American-International Airways of New York for $500,000. Being a registered contract air carrier, they could only charter out the planes to other airlines. They completely overhauled and refurbished the Capetown Clipper, which they renamed Bermuda Sky Queen. While on a leased flight from the United Kingdom strong headwinds forced it to put down in the North Atlantic Ocean on October 14, 1947. After being badly damaged while an attempt was made by the U.S. Coast Guard to tow her, she was sunk by the Coast Guard vessel with incendiary gunfire. The loss of the Bermuda Sky Queen resulted in American-International Airways losing their operating license. When this occurred, the Anzac Clipper was still on the east coast, while the other four were still in San Diego.

=== BOAC ===
Separately, BOAC following the end of the war had removed the camouflage paint from its three 314s in July 1945, and continued to use them to provide a transatlantic service until Bristol made its last crossing on March 7, 1946, with Bangor and Berwick being used to provide a twice-weekly service between Baltimore, Maryland and Darrell's Island in Bermuda. This was maintained up until January 27, 1948, when Bristol, with 55 passengers on board, flew the final flight before they were withdrawn from service. During their six and a half years of service with BOAC, the 314s had flown 4,250,000 miles while carrying 40,042 passengers. They were replaced on the route by Lockheed Constellations flying from New York and Baltimore to Bermuda.

All three were then sold to the aircraft brokerage firm General Phoenix Corporation of Baltimore on April 29, 1948, which stored on their beaching cradles at Harbor Field in Baltimore.

=== World Airways ===
The former owner of American-International Airways, J. Stuart Robinson who was by now president of start-up airline World Airways using the insurance money he had received from the loss of Bermuda Sky Queen to purchase the three BOAC 314s for $6,949.74 each in April 1948. He then raised a mortgage from the General Phoenix Corporation, which he used to purchase the American Clipper, Anzac Clipper, Atlantic Clipper California Clipper and Dixie Clipper. As a result, by 1948 World Airways now owned all of the remaining Clippers. The General Phoenix Corporation gave permission for Anzac Clipper, American Clipper and Dixie Clipper to be dismantled for parts to keep the other aircraft flying on routes along the eastern seaboard between New York and San Juan. At some point after this NC18606 American Clipper had been transferred to Harbor Field in Baltimore where by April 1950 it was being dismantled to be sold for scrap. By early 1949, World Airways was bankrupt, leaving the Bangor, Berwick and Bristol in Baltimore, while the Atlantic Clipper California Clipper and Dixie Clipper were still in San Diego.

Robinson had meanwhile approved the dismantling of Berwick, with its remains sold for scrap in late 1949 to Baltimore's Tomke Aluminum Co. Separately he had sold the Bangor and Bristol to the Baltimore Lumber Company, who it is believed intended to use them as fire-fighting aircraft. When this failed to materialize, they sold the Bangor for $2,000 to the Tomke Aluminum Company for scrap, producing 50,000 pounds (23,000 kg) of metal. Tomke also purchased Bristol which they believe could be made flyable. They sold it in 1950 to Jesse Lee Boland who anchored it in Baltimore Harbour while he and his sons began refurbishing it. During a storm on 7 April 1951 the Bristol broke free from its moorings and sunk in 20 feet (6.1 m) of water, half a mile off Harbor Field. Boland rejected a quote of $20,000 from a salvage company to raise it and attempted to do it himself. He eventually abandoned the aircraft and it was declared to be derelict by harbour officials, who arranged for it to be raised and scrapped. The Bristol had been the last 314 to fly on January 27, 1948.

Meanwhile, within a year World Airways had been reorganized under new ownership and was still the registered owner of NC18604Atlantic Clipper, NC18602 California Clipper and NC18605Dixie Clipper, though with General Phoenix Corporation still having a mortgage over the aircraft. They were reports of them still being at Lindbergh Field on San Diego as late as 1951, before they were eventually scrapped.

== Variants ==
Model 314
Initial production version with GR2600A2 Twin Cyclone engines, six built for Pan American at an average of $668,908 at a time when a DC-3 cost $115,000. In addition, Pan American purchased $756,450 of spares.
Model 314A

This improved version featured:

- An increased gross take-off weight of 84,000 pounds (38,000 kg), an increase of 2,000 pounds (910 kg). Following reinforcement of their airframes the earlier 314s were also cleared to have this higher take-off weight.
- An improved engines, the GR2600A2A which gave more power and which drove larger diameter propellers with an improved blade design.
- The step on the bottom of the hull was moved further back to prevent the porpoising that had troubled the 314.
- An increase in fuel capacity from 4,200 gallons to 5,448 gallons. This offered improved security on more turbulent winter flights. This improvement was retrofitted to the original 314s.
- The oil capacity was decreased? from 206 to 300 gallons due to the use of more efficient hopper oil tanks, which as well as reducing the oil load, improved cold weather engine starting.
- A revised interior.
- The 314A dispensed with the recessed steps that led up the side of the nose.

Each 314A cost Pan American $800,000.

=== Military designations ===
Those pressed into service with the U.S. military were given the following designations:

B-314
Five Model 314s who served with the U.S. Navy.
C-98
Four Model 314s who served with the U.S. Army Air Forces.

== Operators ==
United States

- Pan American World Airways
- United States Army Air Forces
- United States Navy
- Universal Airlines
- American-International Airways
- World Airways

United Kingdom

- British Overseas Airways Corporation

Aircraft operated by Pan American
Registration	Type	Name	In service	Remarks
NC18601	314	Honolulu Clipper	1939–1945	Successfully landed 650 miles east of Oahu after losing power in two engines while flying for the US Navy on November 3, 1945. Aircraft mechanics from the escort carrier Manila Bay were unable to repair the engines at sea. The seaplane tender San Pablo attempted towing into port; but the flying boat was damaged in a collision with the tender and deliberately sunk on November 14 by Oerlikon 20 mm gunfire after salvage was deemed impractical.
NC18602	314	California Clipper; Pacific Clipper	1939–1950	Flew from Auckland to New York in 1941–1942. Purchased by the American government following the entry of the U.S.A into World War II, but operated by Pan Am. Sold to Universal Airlines 1946, American-International Airways 1947, World Airways 1948. Scrapped in approximately 1951.
NC18603	314	Yankee Clipper	1939–1943	Started transatlantic mail service. Purchased by the American government following the entry of the U.S.A into World War II, but operated by Pan American. Crashed on February 22, 1943, when a wing hit the water during a turn when landing at Lisbon, Portugal. A total of 24 of 39 on board were killed.
NC18604	314	Atlantic Clipper	1939–1946	Purchased by the American government following the entry of the U.S.A into World War II, but operated by Pan American. Sold to Universal Airlines 1946, American-International Airways 1947, World Airways 1948. Scrapped in approximately 1951.
NC18605	314	Dixie Clipper	1939–1950	Started transatlantic passenger service, later sold to World Airways. Purchased by the American government following the entry of the U.S.A into World War II, but operated by Pan American. First presidential flight, when she flew Franklin D. Roosevelt to the Casablanca Conference in January 1943. Sold to Universal Airlines 1946, American-International Airways 1947, World Airways 1948. Scrapped in approximately 1951.
NC18606	314	American Clipper	1939–1946	Purchased by the American government following the entry of the U.S.A into World War II, but operated by Pan American. Sold to Universal Airlines 1946, American-International Airways 1947, World Airways 1948. Scrapped in 1950.
NC18609	314A	California Clipper; Pacific Clipper	1941–1946	Temporarily named California Clipper to replace 18602 that was being moved to Atlantic service, renamed Pacific Clipper in 1942. Later sold to Universal Airlines. Damaged by storm and salvaged for parts.
NC18611	314A	Anzac Clipper	1941–1951	Purchased by the American government following the entry of the U.S.A into World War II, but operated by Pan American. Sold to Universal Airlines 1946, American-International Airways 1947, World Airways 1948. Sold privately 1951, destroyed at Baltimore, Maryland 1951.
NC18612	314A	Cape Town Clipper	1941–1946	Purchased by the American government following the entry of the U.S.A into World War II, but operated by Pan American. Sold to Universal Airlines 1946 and then American-International Airways 1947. As the Bermuda Sky Queen she ran out of fuel while crossing the Atlantic on a westward flight, and ditched at sea about 500 miles east of Gander on October 14, 1947. After the rescue of all passengers and crew, she was sunk by the United States Coast Guard as a hazard to navigation.

Aircraft operated by BOAC
Registration	Type	Name	In service	Remarks
G-AGBZ	314A (#2081)	Bristol	1941–1948	Originally NC18607, sold to General Phoenix Corporation, Baltimore as NC18607 in 1948
G-AGCA	314A (#2082)	Berwick	1941–1948	Originally NC18608, sold to General Phoenix Corporation, Baltimore as NC18608 in 1948. This aircraft flew both Winston Churchill and Lord Beaverbrook, Britain's Minister of Supply back urgently to the United Kingdom in mid-January 1942 after the British Prime Minister's extended stay in the United States following the attack on Pearl Harbor. Churchill was the first head of government to make a transatlantic crossing by plane.
G-AGCB	314A (#2084)	Bangor	1941–1948	Originally NC18610, sold to General Phoenix Corporation, Baltimore as NC18610 in 1948

== Surviving aircraft ==
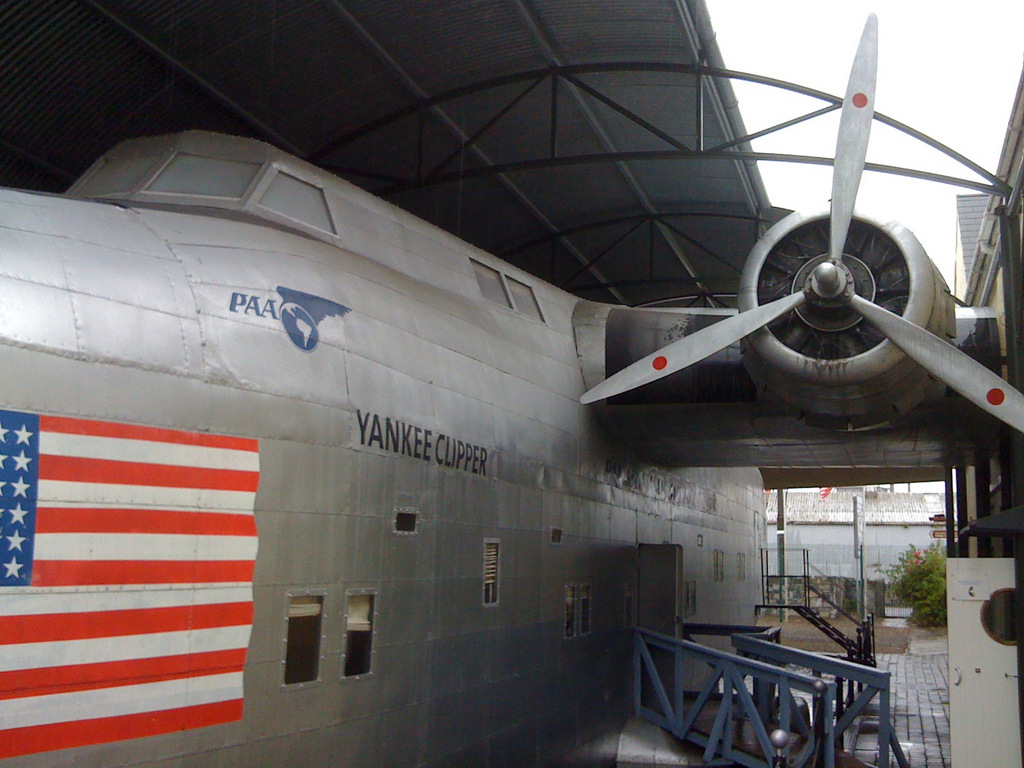
Full-size replica of a Boeing 314 at the Foynes Flying Boat Museum, County Limerick, Ireland

None of the dozen 314s built between 1939 and 1941 survived beyond 1951, with all 12 being cannibalized for parts, scuttled, scrapped, or otherwise written off. Underwater Admiralty Sciences, a non-profit oceanographic exploration and science research organization based in Kirkland, Washington, announced in 2005, at the 70th Anniversary of the first China Clipper flight in San Francisco, its plans to survey, photograph, and possibly recover the remains of the hulls of two sunken 314s: NC18601 (Honolulu Clipper), scuttled in the Pacific Ocean in 1945; and NC18612 (Bermuda Sky Queen, formerly Cape Town Clipper), sunk in the Atlantic by the Coast Guard in 1947. UAS has also spent significant time at Pan American reunions and with individual crewmembers and employees of Pan American conducting videotaped interviews for the mission's companion documentary. However, as of 2014, no search or recovery had been attempted, with the most recent news from 2011 suggesting that the company was still in need of at least US$8 million to get the plan under way.

There is a life-size 314 mockup at the Foynes Flying Boat Museum, Foynes, County Limerick, Ireland, located on the site of the original transatlantic flying-boat terminus.

== Specifications (314A Clipper) ==

Data from Jane's Fighting Aircraft of World War II

General characteristics

- Crew: 10 to 16
- Capacity: 68 day passengers and/or 36 sleeping passengers / 5 short tons (4,536 kg) of mail and or cargo
- Length: 106 ft (32 m)
- Wingspan: 152 ft (46 m)
- Height: 20 ft 4.5 in (6.210 m)
- Airfoil: root: NACA 0018; tip: NACA 0010
- Empty weight: 48,400 lb (21,954 kg)
- Gross weight: 84,000 lb (38,102 kg)
- Fuel capacity: 5,408 US gal (4,503 imp gal; 20,470 L) in wing and sponson tanks
- Powerplant: 4 × Wright GR2600A2A 14-cylinder air-cooled radial piston engines, 1,600 hp (1,200 kW) each
- Propellers: 3-bladed Hamilton Standard fully-feathering constant-speed propellers

Performance

- Maximum speed: 210 mph (340 km/h, 180 kn) at 6,200 ft (1,900 m)
- Cruise speed: 188 mph (303 km/h, 163 kn) at 66.5% power at 11,000 ft (3,400 m)
- Range: 3,685 mi (5,930 km, 3,202 nmi) normal

== Cultural influence ==
Inspired by the airplane, Smith Corona designed, manufactured, and marketed a typewriter model it called the Clipper from 1945 to 1960. The logo prominently featured the Boeing 314 Clipper on the typewriter's body which served as a reminder of the luxury and design of the original airplane.

It was the origin of one of the nicknames of Joe DiMaggio, the "Yankee Clipper".

The novel Night Over Water (1991) by Ken Follett relates a fictitious last commercial flight of the Clipper at the beginning of World War II. The novel includes detailed descriptions of both the passenger and the flight decks, as well as of the operation of the plane.

== Notable aircraft ==
- NC-18601 – Honolulu Clipper
- NC-18602 – Pacific Clipper/California Clipper
- NC-18603 – Yankee Clipper
- NC-18605 – Dixie Clipper

== See also ==
Related development

- Boeing XB-15

Aircraft of comparable role, configuration, and era

- Dornier Do X
- Latécoère 521
- Latécoère 631
- Martin M-130
- Saunders-Roe Princess
- Short Empire
- Short S.26

Related lists

- List of aircraft of World War II
- List of flying boats and floatplanes
