= USS Manila Bay =

Casablanca-class escort carrier of the US Navy

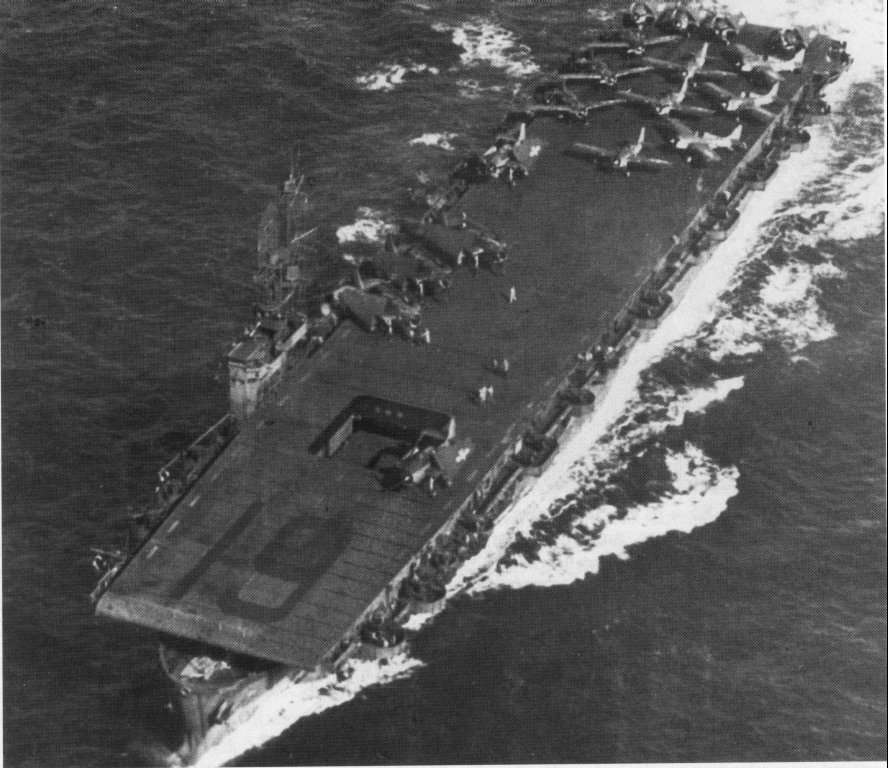
- USS Manila Bay (CVE-61) underway whilst operating as an attack carrier in the Pacific, circa 1944.

History

United States
- Name: Manila Bay
- Namesake: Battle of Manila Bay
- Ordered: as Bucareli Bay (ACV-61)
- Builder: Kaiser Shipyards, Vancouver, Washington
- Laid down: 15 January 1943
- Launched: 10 July 1943
- Commissioned: 5 October 1943
- Decommissioned: 31 July 1946
- Reclassified: CVU-61 on 12 June 1955
- Stricken: 27 May 1958
- Identification: Hull symbol:CVE-61; Code letters:NKVK
- Fate: Sold for scrap on 2 September 1959

General characteristics
- Class & type: Casablanca-class escort carrier
- Displacement: 7,800 long tons (7,925 t)
- Length: 512 ft (156 m) overall
- Beam: 65 ft (20 m)
- Draft: 22 ft 6 in (6.86 m)
- Installed power: 4 × 285 psi boilers; 9,000 shp (6,700 kW)
- Propulsion: 2 × 5-cylinder reciprocating Skinner Unaflow engines; 2 2 × screws
- Speed: 19 kn (22 mph; 35 km/h)
- Range: 10,240 nmi (18,960 km) at 10 kn (12 mph; 19 km/h)
- Complement: Total: 910–916 officers and men; Embarked Squadron: 50–56; Ship's Crew: 860
- Armament: 1 × 5 in (127 mm)/38 caliber dual purpose gun; 16 × 40 mm (1.6 in) Bofors guns (8×2), 20 × 20 mm (0.79 in) Oerlikon cannons (20×1)
- Aircraft carried: 27

Service record
- Operations: Gilbert and Marshall Islands campaign, Western New Guinea campaign, Battle off Samar, Battle of Mindoro, Invasion of Lingayen Gulf, Operation Magic Carpet
- Awards: 8 battle stars

USS Manila Bay (CVE-61) was a Casablanca-class escort carrier of the United States Navy.

She was laid down as Bucareli Bay (ACV-61) under Maritime Commission contract by Kaiser Company, Inc., Vancouver, Washington on 15 January 1943; renamed Manila Bay on 3 April 1943; launched on 10 July 1943; sponsored by Mrs. Robert W. Bockius; reclassified CVE-61 on 15 July 1943; acquired by the Navy on 5 October 1943; and commissioned the same day at Astoria, Oregon, Captain Boynton L. Braun in command.

== Design and description ==
A side profile of the design of Thetis Bay.

Manila Bay was a Casablanca-class escort carrier, the most numerous type of aircraft carriers ever built. Built to stem heavy losses during the Battle of the Atlantic, they came into service in late 1943, by which time the U-boat threat was already in retreat. Although some did see service in the Atlantic, the majority were utilized in the Pacific, ferrying aircraft, providing logistics support, and conducting close air support for the island-hopping campaigns. The Casablanca-class carriers were built on the standardized Type S4-S2-BB3 hull, a lengthened variant of the Doyen-class hull, and specifically designed to be mass-produced using welded prefabricated sections. This allowed them to be produced at unprecedented speeds: the final ship of her class, Munda, was delivered to the Navy just 101 days after the laying of her keel.

Manila Bay was 512 ft 3 in (156.13 m) long overall (490 ft (150 m) at the waterline), had a beam of 65 ft 2 in (19.86 m), and a draft of 20 ft 9 in (6.32 m). She displaced 8,188 long tons (8,319 t) standard, which increased to 10,902 long tons (11,077 t) with a full load. To carry out flight operations, the ship had a 257 ft (78 m) hangar deck and a 474 ft (144 m) flight deck. Her compact size necessitated the installation of an aircraft catapult at her bow, and there were two aircraft elevators to facilitate movement of aircraft between the flight and hangar deck: one each fore and aft.

She was powered by four Babcock & Wilcox Express D boilers that raised 285 psi (1,970 kPa) of steam at 577 °F (303 °C). The steam generated by these boilers fed two Skinner Unaflow reciprocating steam engines, delivering 9,000 hp (6,700 kW) to two propeller shafts. This allowed her to reach speeds of 19 kn (35 km/h; 22 mph), with a cruising range of 10,240 nmi (18,960 km; 11,780 mi) at 15 kn (28 km/h; 17 mph). For armament, one 5 in (127 mm)/38 caliber dual-purpose gun was mounted on the stern. Additional anti-aircraft defense was provided by eight Bofors 40 mm (1.57 in) anti-aircraft guns in single mounts and twelve Oerlikon 20 mm (0.79 in) cannons mounted around the perimeter of the deck. By 1945, Casablanca-class carriers had been modified to carry twenty Oerlikon cannons and sixteen Bofors guns; the doubling of the latter was accomplished by putting them into twin mounts. Sensors onboard consisted of a SG surface-search radar and a SK air-search radar.

Although Casablanca-class escort carriers were intended to function with a crew of 860 and an embarked squadron of 50 to 56, the exigencies of wartime often necessitated the inflation of the crew count. They were designed to operate with 27 aircraft, but the hangar deck could accommodate much more during transport or training missions.

== Service history ==
=== World War II ===
After a shakedown cruise along the west coast, Manila Bay sailed for Pearl Harbor on 20 November and returned a load of damaged planes to San Diego on 4 December. After training exercises, with Composite Squadron 7 (VC-7) embarked, she departed Hawaii on 3 January 1944. A week later she embarked Rear Admiral Ralph Davidson and became flagship for Carrier Division 24. Joining Task Force 52 (TF 52), she sortied 22 January for the invasion of the Marshall Islands. Between 31 January-6 February, she launched air and antisubmarine patrols as well as dozens of combat missions. Her planes bombed and strafed enemy positions from Kwajalein Island north to Bigej Island and destroyed ammunition dumps and ground installations. She remained in the Marshalls during the next month and extended her operations late in February first to Eniwetok and then to Majuro.

Departing Majuro on 7 March, Manila Bay reached Espiritu Santo on the 12th. Three days later she joined TF 37 for airstrikes and surface bombardments against Kavieng, New Ireland on 19–20 March. During the next month she cruised between the Solomons and the Bismarck Archipelago supporting the protracted offensive to neutralize the Archipelago and the Japanese fortress at Rabaul. Thence, on 19 April she steamed so that her planes could attack enemy positions on New Guinea.

==== New Guinea ====
American naval and ground forces began a three–pronged invasion along northern New Guinea at Aitape, Hollandia, and Tanahmerah Bay on 22 April. During and after the invasion Manila Bay launched protective air patrols and sent fighters and bombers to attack and destroy Japanese installations in the Aitape area. On 4 May she returned to Manus Island where Rear Admiral Felix Stump relieved Admiral Davidson as Commander, Carrier Division 24. Admiral Stump transferred his flag to Corregidor on 6 May, and the following day Manila Bay sailed for overhaul at Pearl Harbor where she arrived on 18 May.

After loading 37 Army Republic P-47 Thunderbolts of the Army Air Forces' 73rd Fighter Squadron, 318th Fighter Group, Manila Bay sailed on 5 June for the Mariana Islands. Steaming via Eniwetok, she reached the eastern approaches to Saipan on 19 June. During the next 4 days, she remained east of the embattled island as ships and planes of the Fast Carrier Task Force repulsed the Japanese Fleet in the Battle of the Philippine Sea, and inflicted staggering losses on the enemy, crippling the Imperial Navy’s air strength permanently.

On 23 June, Manila Bay came under enemy air attack during refueling operations east of Saipan. Four Aichi D3A Val dive bombers attacked her from dead ahead, dropping their bombs which exploded wide to port. As a precautionary and rather unusual move which Raymond A. Spruance later characterized as "commendable initiative", Manila Bay launched four of the P-47 Thunderbolts she was ferrying to fly protective CAP until radar screens were clear of contacts. The Army fighters then flew to Saipan, their intended destination. Manila Bay launched the remaining planes the next day and returned to Eniwetok, arriving on 27 June. After embarking 207 wounded troops, she departed on 1 July, touched Pearl Harbor on the 8th, and reached San Diego on 16 July.

Manila Bay returned to Pearl on 31 August. Two days later, Captain Fitzhugh Lee III took command of the veteran carrier, and after embarking VC-80, Manila Bay departed on 15 September as a unit of Carrier Division 24 (CarDiv 24). Steaming via Eniwetok, she reached Manus 3 October and began final preparations for the invasion of the Philippines at Leyte Gulf.

==== Leyte Gulf ====
Assigned to the Task Group 77.4 (TG 77.4), Manila Bay departed on 12 October for waters east of the Philippines. Prior to the invasion, her planes pounded enemy ground targets on Leyte, Samar, and Cebu Islands. She launched ground support, spotting, and air cover strikes during the amphibious assaults on 20 October, and she sent bombers and fighters to support ground forces during the critical first few days at Leyte.

As Manila Bay cruised to the east of Leyte Gulf with other carriers of Admiral Stump's "Taffy 2" (Task Unit 77.4.2, TU 77.4.2), powerful Japanese naval forces converged upon the Philippines and launched a three-pronged offensive to drive the Americans from Leyte. In a series of masterful and coordinated surface attacks, an American battleship, cruiser, and destroyer force met and destroyed enemy ships in the Battle of Surigao Strait early on 25 October. Surviving Japanese ships retreated into the Mindanao Sea pursued by destroyers, PT boats, and after sunrise by carrier-based bombers and fighters.

Manila Bay sent an eight-plane strike against ground targets on Leyte before sunrise; subsequently, these planes bombed and strafed retiring enemy ships southwest of Panaon Island. A second strike about midmorning pounded the cruiser Mogami. In the meantime, however, Manila Bay turned her planes against a more immediate threat: the enemy attack against ships of Taffy 3.

===== Samar =====
A running battle ensued between the escort carriers of Rear Adm. Clifton Sprague's Taffy 3 and the larger, vastly more powerful surface ships of Vice Admiral Takeo Kurita's Center Force. The self-sacrificing attacks by American destroyers and destroyer escorts, and the prompt, aggressive, and unceasing torpedo, bomb, and strafing strikes by planes from Taffy 2 and Taffy 3 contributed to the American victory against great odds in the Battle off Samar.

Manila Bay launched two airstrikes during the enemy pursuit of Taffy 3 and two more as the Japanese retreated. At 08:30, she sent four torpedo-laden Grumman TBM Avengers and a seven-plane escort to join the desperate fight. Three launched torpedoes at a battleship, probably Yamato, but they missed. The fourth plane launched her torpedo at a heavy cruiser, most likely Chikuma. It hit the ship to starboard near the fantail, forcing her out of control. The second strike an hour later by two Avengers resulted in one torpedo hit on the portside amidships against an unidentified battleship.

As the Japanese ships broke off attack and circled off Samar, the airstrikes continued. At 11:20, Manila Bay launched four Avengers, carrying 500 pound bombs, and four bombers from other carriers. Escorted by General Motors FM-2 Wildcats and led by Commander R. L. Fowler, they soon joined planes from other Taffy carriers. Shortly after 12:30, some 70 planes surprised and attacked the retiring Center Force, strafing and bombing through intense antiaircraft fire. Manila Bay's bombers made a hit and two near misses on the lead battleship, probably Kongō or Haruna. Manila Bay launched her final strike at 12:45, strafing destroyers and getting two hits on a cruiser.

Later that afternoon, Manila Bay's CAP intercepted a Japanese bomber-fighter strike about 50 miles north of Taffy 2. Her four fighters broke up the enemy formation, and with reinforcements drove off the attackers before they reached the carriers. Her planes continued to attack enemy ships the following day. Laden with rockets and bombs, one of her Avengers scored two hits on the cruiser Kinu and several rocket hits on the destroyer Uranami. Both ships sank about noon in the Visayan Sea after numerous air attacks.

Manila Bay resumed air operations in support of Leyte ground forces on 27 October. During ground support and air cover missions, her planes shot down an Aichi D3A "Val" on 27 October and bagged two Nakajima Ki-43 "Oscars" on 29 October. Late on 30 October she sailed for the Admiralty Islands, arriving at Manus on 4 November.

==== Mindoro ====
After steaming to Kossol Passage late in November, Manila Bay departed on 10 December to provide air cover for the Mindoro invasion convoys. The task force entered Mindanao Sea early on 13 December. Late that afternoon in the Sulu Sea south of Negros, they encountered enemy aircraft. The fighter cover shot down or repulsed most of the attackers. Accurate fire from Manila Bay shot down one kamikaze. A second kamikaze hit the destroyer Haraden.

During and after the Mindoro landings on 15 December, Manila Bay sent her planes on ground support and air cover missions. As troops poured ashore, more kamikazes attempted to break the air cover and crash into ships of the covering and carrier group. The few that escaped the combat air patrols were either shot down or driven off by accurate antiaircraft fire. Manila Bay helped down three of the raiders and her fighters knocked out two more. After recovering her planes on 16 December, she sailed in convoy via Surigao Strait and reached Kossol on 19 December.

After a trip to Manus, Manila Bay sortied New Year's Day 1945 with ships of the Luzon Attack Force. With five other escort carriers she provided air cover for Vice Admiral Jesse B. Oldendorf's Bombardment and Fire Support Group, and direct air support for Vice Admiral Daniel E. Barbey's San Fabian Attack Force.

The task groups steamed via Surigao Strait and the Mindanao Sea into the Sulu Sea where they turned north for the Mindoro Strait. Enemy nuisance and suicide raids began in earnest on 4 January; and despite the tight air cover provided by CVE aircraft, a kamikaze crashed into the flight deck of Ommaney Bay causing her to sink.

==== Lingayen Gulf ====
The enemy air attacks intensified on 5 January. Patrolling fighters broke up morning and early afternoon strikes, shooting down numerous raiders. At 16:50, a third attack sent all hands to general quarters. Vectored CAP shot down several enemy planes and anti-aircraft fire accounted for others. Three planes got through to the cruisers Louisville, the destroyer Stafford, and the Australian cruiser Australia.

===== Kamikaze strike =====
Just before 17:50, two kamikazes dove at Manila Bay from the portside. The first plane hit the flight deck to starboard abaft the bridge, causing fires on the flight and hangar decks, destroying radar transmitting spaces, and wiping out all communications. The second plane, aimed for the bridge, missed the island close aboard to starboard and hit the sea off the fantail.

Firefighting parties promptly brought the blazes under control, including those of two fueled and burning torpedo planes in the hangar deck. Within 24 hours, she resumed limited air operations. Most repairs to her damaged electrical and communication circuits were completed by 9 January, when the amphibious invasion in Lingayen Gulf got underway.

Manila Bay had 15 men killed (one of three men who had been blown overboard was not recovered) and 52 wounded, but by 10 January she resumed full duty in support of the Lingayen Gulf operations. In addition to providing air cover for the task force, her planes flew 104 sorties against targets in western Luzon. They gave effective close support for ground troops at Lingayen and San Fabian and bombed, rocketed, and strafed gun emplacements, buildings, truck convoys, and troop concentrations from Lingayen to Baguio.

Manila Bay departed in convoy late on 17 January. Steaming via Leyte, Ulithi, and Pearl Harbor, she arrived San Diego on 15 February. Battle damage repairs completed late in April, with VC-72 embarked she trained in Hawaiian waters until sailing for the western Pacific on 24 May. She closed the coast of Okinawa on 13 June and during the next week launched rocket and strafing strikes in the Ryukyu Islands. She departed for the Marianas on 20 June and operated out of Guam and Eniwetok during the closing weeks of the war.

Manila Bay steamed to the Aleutians in mid-August. As a unit of TF 44, she departed Adak Island on 31 August to support occupation operations in northern Japan. From 7–12 September her planes carried out photographic and reconnaissance missions over northern Honshū and southern Hokkaidō and dropped emergency supplies at POW camps. She returned to Pearl Harbor on 24 September, unloaded her aircraft, and steamed to the Marshall Islands carrying replacement troops.

=== Post-war ===
Assigned to "Magic Carpet" duty, Manila Bay embarked 1,031 veterans at Eniwetok, and from 6–18 October sailed to San Francisco. In November, the carrier aided the disabled Boeing 314 Honolulu Clipper 650 miles east of Oahu. After completing 2 more "Magic Carpet" runs, she departed Pearl Harbor on 27 January 1946 and reached Norfolk, Va. on 18 February.

She steamed to Boston from 15–17 April, decommissioned there on 31 July 1946, and entered the Atlantic Reserve Fleet. She was reclassified CVU-61 on 12 June 1955; her name was struck from the Navy list on 27 May 1958; and she was sold for scrap to Hugo Neu Corp., 2 September 1959.

== Awards ==
Manila Bay received eight battle stars for World War II service.

== Sources ==
=== Online sources ===
https://www.usni.org/magazines/naval-history-magazine/2010/december/kamikazes-wallet

=== Bibliography ===
- Adcock, Al (1996), Escort Carriers in Action - Warships No. 9, Carrollton, Texas: Squadron/Signal Publications, ISBN 9780897473569
- Chesneau, Robert; Gardiner, Robert (1980), Conway's All the World's Fighting Ships 1922–1946, London, England: Naval Institute Press, ISBN 9780870219139
- Friedman, Norman (1983), U.S. Aircraft Carriers: An Illustrated Design History, Annapolis, Maryland: Naval Institute Press, ISBN 9780870217395
- Ross, Al (1993), The Escort Carrier Gambier Bay, Anatomy of the Ship, London, England: Conway Maritime Press, ISBN 9781557502353
- Y'Blood, William (2012), The Little Giants: U.S. Escort Carriers Against Japan, Annapolis, Maryland: Naval Institute Press, ISBN 9781612512471
