= Dixie Clipper =

Flying boat used by Franklin D. Roosevelt

General information
- Type: Boeing 314
- Owners: Pan American World Airways 1939-1942; American government 1942-1946; Universal Airlines 1946-1947; American International Airways 1947-1948; World Airways 1948-1951
- Registration: NC18605
- Serial: 48225

History
- Manufactured: 1938-1939
- First flight: 1939
- In service: 1939 to 1946
- Fate: Retired - scrapped

The Dixie Clipper (civil registration NC18605) was an American Boeing 314 Clipper flying boat, best known for beginning, in June 1939, the first scheduled air service between America and Europe, the first American aircraft to carry passengers and a cargo of mail across the South Atlantic and the first all-metal air transport to fly 3,120 miles non-stop. Between 14 January and 30 January 1943 it flew American president Franklin D. Roosevelt most of the way to and from the Casablanca Conference. In doing so it set a number of firsts with Roosevelt the first president to fly while in office, the first to fly across an ocean, the first to visit three continents by air and the first to cross the equator four times.

== Service history ==
The Dixie Clipper was one of six Model 314 flying boats ordered by Pan American airlines from the Boeing Airplane Company on 21 July 1936. Allocated the civil registration NC18605 it was delivered to Pan American in June 1939 and was allocated to its Atlantic routes.

Captained by R. O. D. Sullivan with first officers Gilbert B. Blackmore and Robert D. Fordyce, with a total crew of 11 Dixie Clipper departed from Port Washington, New York on 28 June 1939 on the first scheduled passenger service to Europe, with stops in Lisbon and Marseille. Thousands of people came to witness the take-off with a 85-piece band from the Port Washington High School providing entertainment. Among the 22 passengers on board were Pan American chairman Cornelius Vanderbilt Whitney, his wife, William J. Donovan, John M. Franklin, Southern Railway executive William J. Eck, Clara Adams, who was on the first leg of a round-the-world flight; Torkild Rieber, Roger Lapham, investment banker Harold Leonard Stuart and Elizabeth Trippe. There was a waiting list of 500 passengers for the flight. Eck, received a silver cigarette case for being the first paying passenger on the route. Eck also flew on the 50,000th crossing of the Atlantic Ocean on Pan Am in 1955. With an immediate stop in Horta it took 23 hours and 53 minutes to reach Lisbon, arriving at 6.15am local time.

On 4 August 1940, Varian Fry of the Emergency Rescue Committee traveled on the Dixie Clipper to Portugal, and from there made his way to Marseille, where he went on to help rescue intellectuals and artists trapped in Vichy France.

=== Wartime service ===
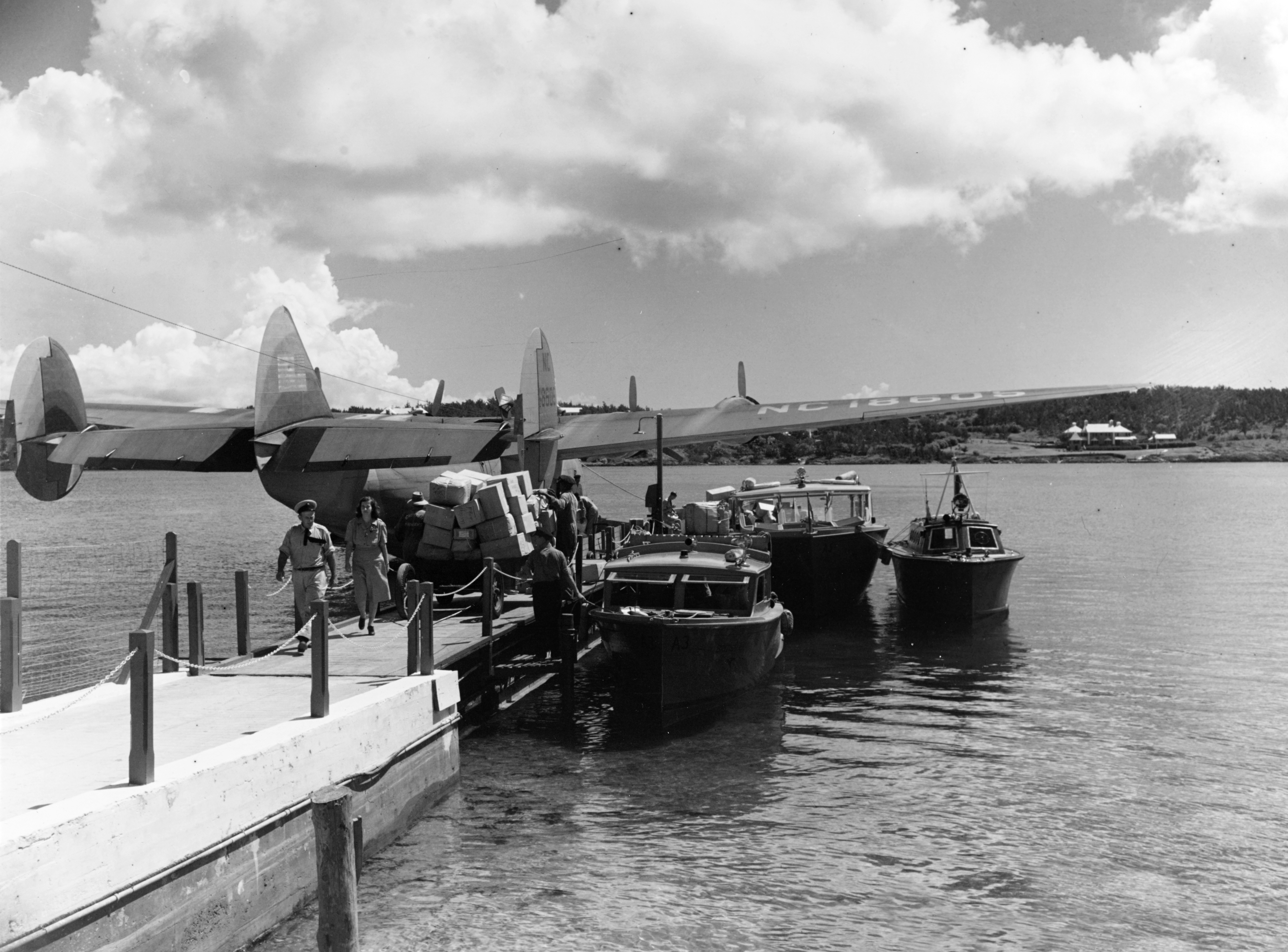
Boeing 314 Dixie Clipper docked at Darrell's Island, Bermuda, on 18 September 1942)

Following the entry of the United States into World War II in December 1941 Dixie Clipper together with the rest of the Pan American's fleet of 314s was requisitioned on 14 December 1941 by the American War Department who assigned it to the United States Navy, who gave it the BuNo designation 48225. though another source states it was 48227. It continued to be maintained and operated by Pan American on behalf of the navy, with all crew members becoming part of the naval military reserve. The Dixie Clipper initially continued to provide a passenger service between the United States, Portugal and the United Kingdom, until as the war progressed it was employed to transport high-priority passengers (such as high-ranking officers, scientists, war correspondents and USO entertainers), mail and cargo on international routes to Africa, Europe and in the Pacific. The outbound flights the cargo could be as important as vital blood plasma, medical supplies, while on the return they could be vital materials such as beryllium, mica and raw rubber.

==== Presidential service ====
Early in January 1943 John C. Leslie the general manager of Pan American's Atlantic Division was requested to have two 314s available in Miami on 11 January, with each equipped to undertake a special mission with unknown passengers. To maintain secrecy he never told his superiors or even Juan Trippe of the request. He assigned Dixie Clipper under Captain Howard M. Cone and Atlantic Clipper under Captain Richard Vinal to the mission. Both captains were Masters of Ocean Flying, at the time the highest commercial pilot ratings in the world, with each supported by a crew of 10. Both aircraft, freshy painted in a dull sea-grey camouflage scheme left New York on 7 January for the 7½ hour flight to Miami.

Shortly before 10pm on 9 January, a party of 30 headed by Franklin D. Roosevelt left Washington by special train consisting of the engine, the president's carriage, one compartment carriage, one Pullman sleeper, one club/baggage carriage and an Army radio communication carriage manned by a carefully selected engineer and fireman plus five messman from the Presidential Yacht. The party was headed for Casablanca in Morocco to meet British Prime Minister Winston Churchill at what was later termed the Casablanca Conference to discuss Allied military strategy, supplying the Soviet Union, and opening a second front in Western Europe. The train arrived at Military Junction in Miami at 1.30am on 11 January. The aircraft had been checked and fully fuelled to carry a special passenger called “Mr Jones” and his party.

Twenty minutes before the scheduled take-off time the passengers arrived. Dixie Clipper departed at 6am followed by Atlantic Clipper at 6.34am which trailed her sister by approximately 35 miles (56 km). On board the Dixie Clipper were nine passengers: Roosevelt, advisor Harry Hopkins, head of the Joint Chiefs of Staff Admiral William D. Leahy, the president's physician Rear Admiral Ross T. McIntire, naval aide Captain John L. McCrea, the president's valet Arthur Perryman, as well as secret service agents, Guy H. Sparman, Elmer R. Hipsley and Charles W. Fredericks. On board the Atlantic Clipper, which functioned as the communications aircraft, were eight passengers consisting of communications specialists from the army, a photographer, secret service agents and other military personnel.

After 1,633 miles (2,628 km) the Dixie Clipper touched down at the newly constructed Naval Air Station at Trinidad at 4.24pm. The presidential party went ashore and stayed overnight at the navy operated Macqueripe Beach Hotel. The Atlantic Clipper departed at 5.17am the next morning for Belem in Brazil, followed by the Dixie Clipper 45 minutes later. Left behind was Admiral Leahy as he was suffering from a bad chest cold and would be picked up on the return leg. Having flown most of the journey that day at 9,000 feet (2,700 m) the Atlantic Clipper landed on the Rive Para at Belem at 2.40pm, followed at 3.30pm by the Dixie Clipper. The passengers all went ashore while both aircraft were fully refueled and replenished with fresh food in preparation for the 2,100 miles (3,400 km) 19-hour journey across the Atlantic to Bathurst in Gambia. Both aircraft were airborne by 7pm in order to avoid a nighttime take-off and initially cruised at 1,000 feet (300 m) for several hours, due to the weight of their maximum fuel load, which they consumed at a rate of three-fifths of a ton over the course of the crossing. Both aircraft touched down at 4.30pm on the 13 January, where they were greeted by the cruiser USS Memphis. After disembarking onto a whaleboat from the cruiser and going on a cruise around the harbour the president stayed overnight on the Memphis.

As previously recommended by Brigadier General Cyrus R. Smith, the deputy commander of the Air Transport Command, to improve the party's safety while so close to a war zone, the president and his party used two Air Transport Command Douglas C-54 Skymaster’s on the next day to fly the final leg from Yundum Field to Casablanca. After departing at 8:58am, Roosevelt and his party arrived at 6.20pm on 14 January at Casablanca's Medouina Airport, having over the previous 50 hour travelled 7,000 miles (11,000 km). As the 314's were not required until the return leg they flew to Pan American's flying boat base at Fisherman's Lake in Liberia and remained there for two weeks.

After the end of the conference, Roosevelt visited Rabat and Marrakech before returning to Bathurst from where he took a trip up the Gambia River on HMS Aimwell before flying to Liberia, where he met with its president, Edwin Barclay. He returned by C-54 to Bathurst which he reached at 7pm and relaxed on the Memphis until that evening's departure. At 11pm Roosevelt and his party embarked on the waiting 314s. To assist in the take-off, a series of buoyed lights had been laid out on the harbour. The Atlantic Clipper lead the way on what was a turbulent flight which required the passengers to remain strapped into their seats for the entire flight. Two hours away from Natal in Brazil, a piston on the number 3 engine of the Atlantic Clipper failed and oil began to spurt out and cover the wing, trailing edge and tail section. The engine was closed down and slowed, which meant that the Dixie Clipper passed it and touched down on the 28 January, three hours ahead of schedule due to tailwinds, its sister landing 25 minutes later.

Roosevelt disembarked and stayed on the seaplane tender USS Humboldt where he met with the president of Brazil, Getúlio Vargas, where they discussed among other things about Brazil entering the war on the side of the Allies, an event which occurred a week later. Later, Roosevelt accompanied by Vargas visited a number of American and Brazilian military installations. As it would take two days to repair the Atlantic Clipper. The American Clipper was diverted to replace it, with captain Vinal taking over its command.While they awaited the arrival, Roosevelt who didn't want to delay his return to the United States, departed from Parnamarim Field at 6am on the 29 January on two C-54s to Trinidad and stayed in the Macqueripe Beach Hotel. The two 314s travelled independently and rendezvous with the party at Trinidad.

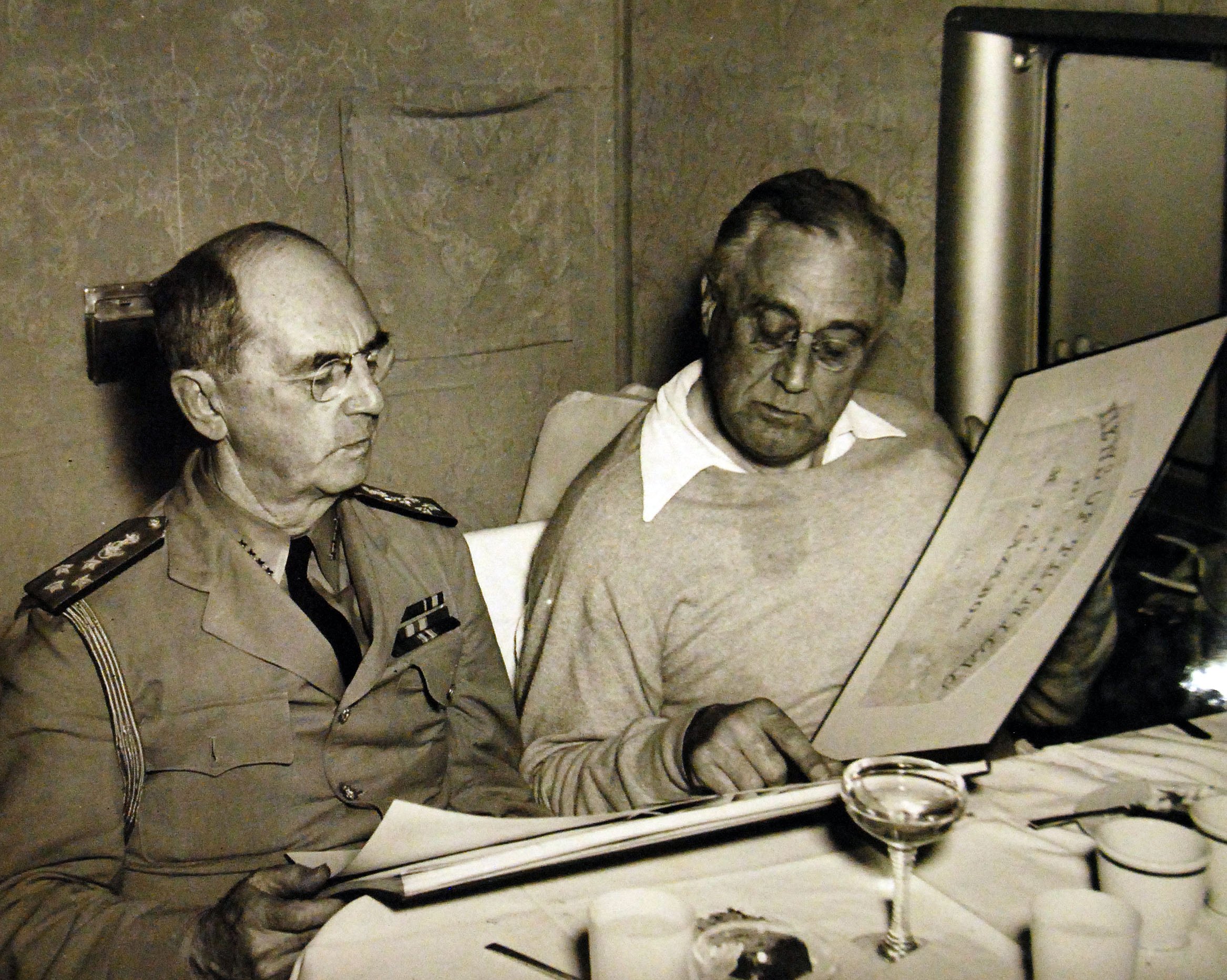
President Roosevelt and Admiral Leahy look over a scenic book on Trinidad aboard the Dixie Clipper on 30 January 1943. The book was a present to the President during a stopover at Trinidad.

With Admiral Leahy having rejoined the party the Dixie Clipper was in the air by 7.10am on 30 January and American Clipper followed two minutes later. In passing over Haiti, shortly after noon, the flight circled the city of Port-au-Prince for a few minutes in order to afford the President a view from the air. Somewhere in the sky 8,000 feet (2,400 m) above the Caribbean President Roosevelt and his staff celebrated his 61st birthday with cake.

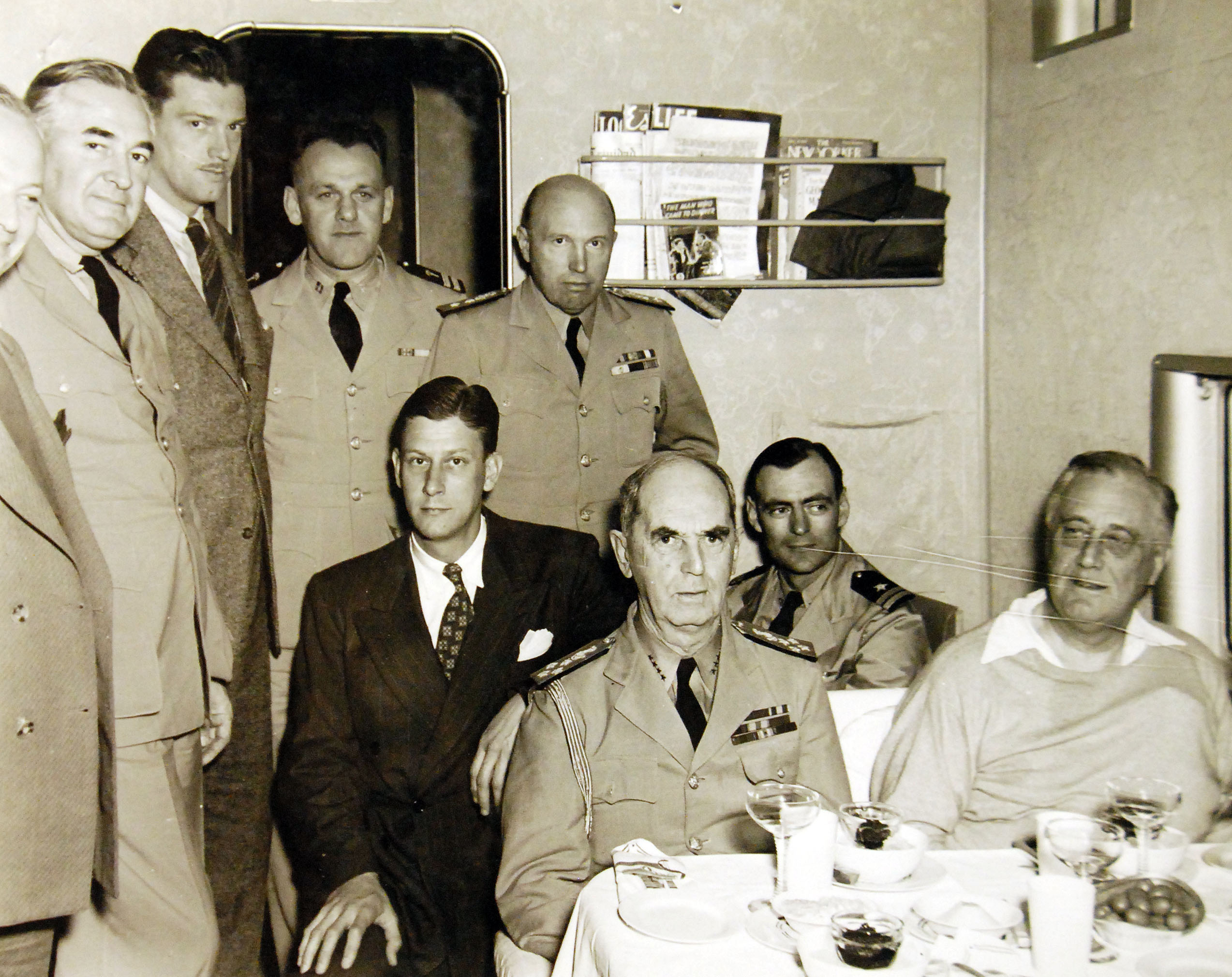
President Roosevelt celebrating his 61st birthday aboard the Dixie Clipper. Seated at the table with him is Admiral Leahy. Seated behind them are Guy Spaman (in dark suit), Secret Service; and Lieutenant Cone, Captain of the Ship. Standing, left to right, Charles Fredericks, Captain John L. McCrea, Presidential Naval Aide; Elmer Hipsley, Secret Service; Lieutenant George Fox, Naval Medical Corps; and Rear Admiral Ross T. McIntire.

After a smooth flight the, Dixie Clipper landed at Biscayne Bay at 4.35pm and from there the presidential party departed on a waiting train at 6pm back to Washington. After a delay due to bad weather, the two 314s returned to New York on 1 February 1943.

The Dixie Clipper had covered 10,964 miles (17,645 km) miles and spent a total of 70 hours and 21 minutes in the air. Following the completion of this mission, the Dixie Clipper returned to its normal duties.

=== Post war ===
Following the end of the war the Dixie Clipper though still owned by the American government were used by Pan American to transport civilian passengers up until 1946. It was then offered to Pan American by the War Assets Administration (WAA) at an asking price of $50,000 each.

As Pan American believed that the future lay with faster and cheaper to operate land based aircraft they declined to take up the option to buy any 314. After being taken out of service Dixie Clipper were stored at Alameda near San Francisco and was offered for sale in April 1946. At some point it was flown south to the milder weather conditions of San Diego which would reduce its deterioration from corrosion. Initially it was anchored in the bay until its beaching cradle arrived which allowed it to be moved out of the water and on to the seaplane ramp at the Convair facility at Lindbergh Field in San Diego.

It and the other WAA owned 314s were purchased for $325,000 by Universal Airlines, a non-scheduled carrier and mortgaged to the brokerage firm General Phoenix Corporation of Baltimore. Within a year the airline was in financial trouble and was declared bankrupt on 28 May 1947.

The Dixie Clipper was among the six 314s purchased in a bankruptcy auction in 1947 by American International Airways of New York for $500,000. Following American-International Airways losing their operating license, start-up airline World Airways purchased the Dixie Clipper. As a result, World Airways now owned all of the remaining 314s. By early 1949, World Airways was bankrupt, with Dixie Clipper still in San Diego. Within a year World Airways had been reorganised under new ownership and was still the registered owner of Dixie Clipper. They were reports of it still being at Lindbergh Field on San Diego as late as 1951, before it was eventually scrapped.

== Bibliography ==
- Bowers, Peter M. (November 1977). "The Great Clippers" (PDF). Airpower. 7 (6). Sentry Books: 26–35, 60, 61.
- Bowers, Peter M. (December 1977). "Flying the Boeing Clipper: Complete Operational History". Wings. 7 (6): 14–15.
- Klaás, M.D. (June 1969). "The Incredible Clippers". Air Classics. Vol. 5, no. 5.
- Klaás, M.D. (April 1991). "When the Clippers Went to War". Air Classics. Vol. 27, no. 4.
- Trautman, James (2011). Pan American Clippers: The Golden Age of Flying Boats (Softcover). Erin, Ontario, Canada: Boston Mills Press. ISBN 978-1-55407-894-3.
