= Pacific Clipper =

First commercial plane to almost circumnavigate the world

Pacific Clipper; California Clipper
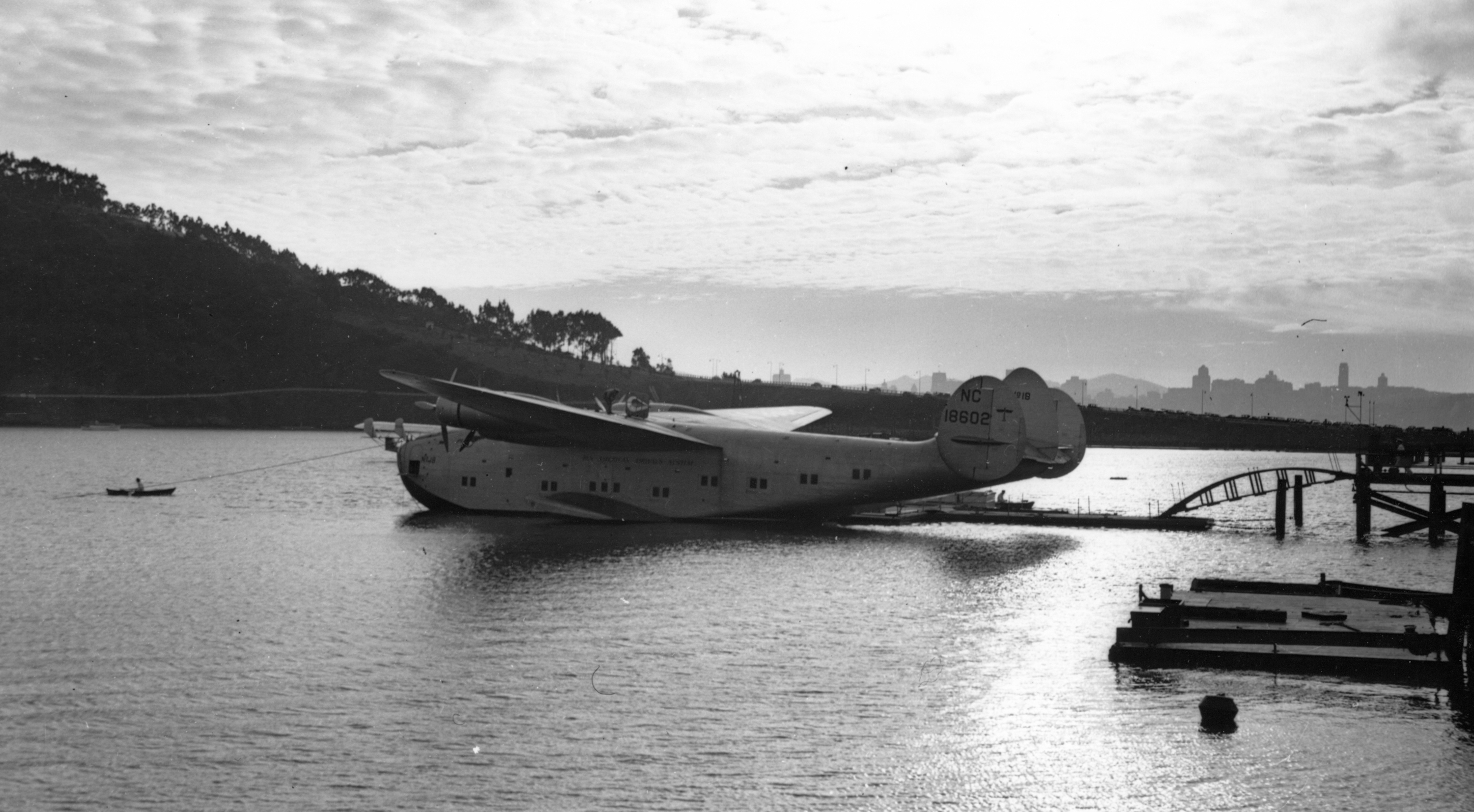
- NC18602 at Treasure Island, possibly in 1939

General information
- Other name: California Clipper (1939–1942)
- Type: Boeing 314
- Owners: Pan American World Airways (1939–1946); Universal Airlines (1946–1951)
- Registration: NC18602

History
- Manufactured: 1938–1939
- First flight: 1939
- In service: 1939–1951
- Fate: Retired - scrapped

The Pacific Clipper (civil registration NC18602) was an American Boeing 314 Clipper flying boat, famous for having completed an unplanned nearly around-the-world flight in December 1941 and January 1942 as the California Clipper. Aviation experts called the flight the first commercial circumnavigation of the globe because the aircraft made it back to its country of origin.

== History ==
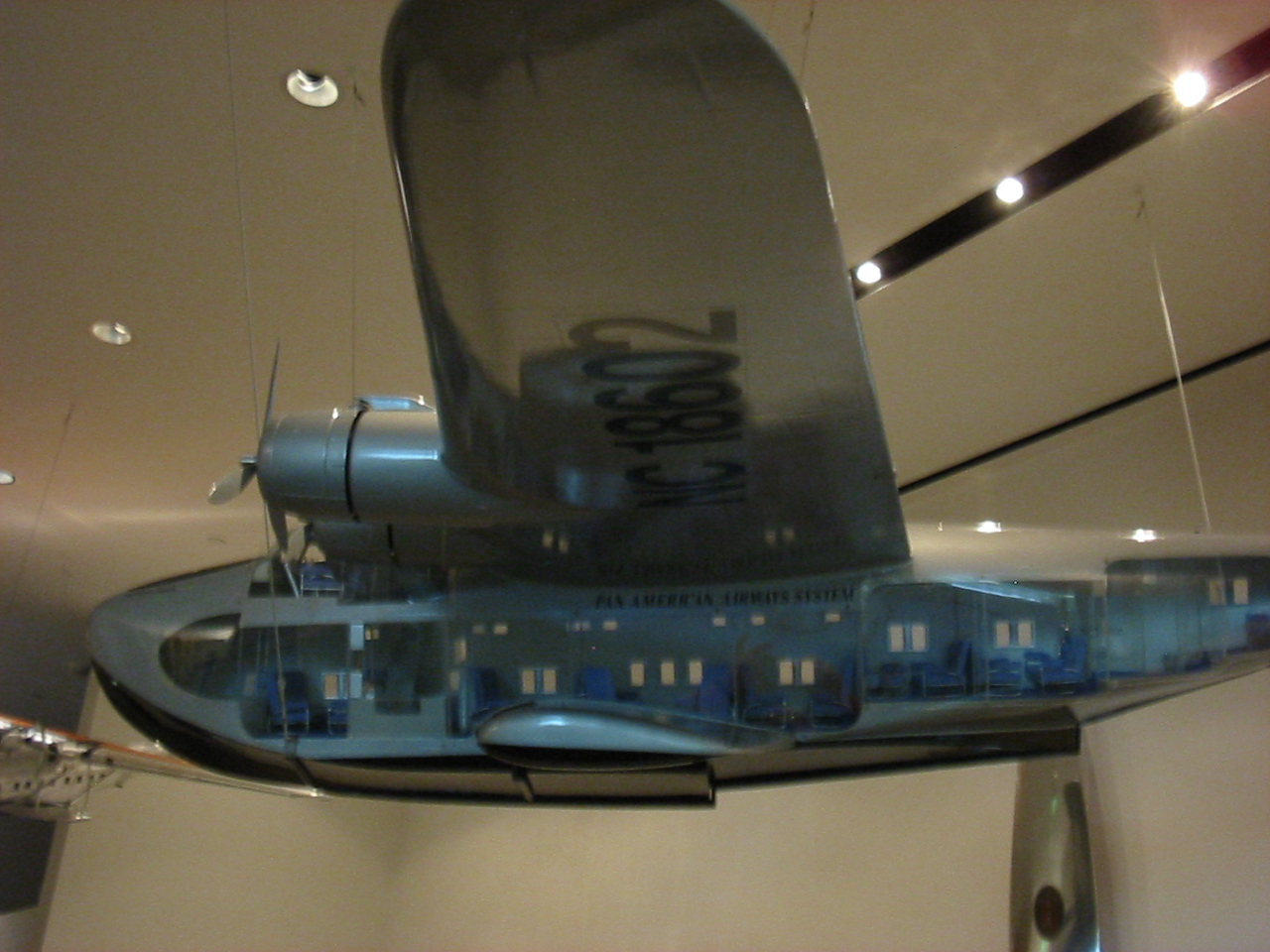
Cutaway model of a Boeing 314 Clipper

The Boeing 314 with civil registration NC18602 was delivered to Pan American; it made its shakedown flight from San Francisco, United States to Hong Kong from February 23 to March 3, 1939.

== Flight ==
Map of the flight path of the Pacific Clipper. Scheduled route from U.S. in blue and extended return flight in red.

On December 2, 1941, the Clipper departed from the Pan American base on Treasure Island, San Francisco for its scheduled passenger service to Auckland, New Zealand. It landed at Pan American's LaGuardia Field seaplane base in New York City five weeks later, at 7:12 on the morning of January 6, 1942.

=== Crew ===
- Captain Robert Ford
- First Officer John H. Mack
- Second Officer/Navigator Roderick N. Brown
- Third Officer James G. Henriksen
- Fourth Officer John D. Steers
- First Engineer Homans K. "Swede" Roth
- Second Engineer John B. "Jocko" Parish
- First Radio Officer John Poindexter*
- Second Radio Officer Oscar Hendrickson
- Radio Operator Edward Leach**
- Purser Barney Sawicki
- Asst Purser Verne C. Edwards

* Poindexter departed Treasure Island, California as an observer tasked with validating the performance of a new radio set; for that leg of the journey, Hendrickson was first radio officer and the second radio officer position was vacant. Upon arrival in San Pedro, California, Captain Ford learned that the man who was supposed in serve as second radio officer was hospitalized and Poindexter, who was senior to Hendrickson, agreed to continue on the trans-Pacific journey, becoming the first radio officer.

**Leach was a staff passenger, originally being transported from Nouméa, New Caledonia to Auckland, New Zealand. After boarding in Nouméa, Leach remained with the aircraft until its arrival in New York.

=== Scheduled points ===
1. San Pedro, California, United States on December 2, 1941, where the designated second radio officer was scheduled to join the crew; Ford learned that the man had been hospitalized. When informed of the need, Poindexter agreed to continue the flight.
2. Honolulu, Hawaii for crew rest.
3. Canton Island for fuel.
4. Suva, Fiji for fuel.
5. Nouméa, New Caledonia for fuel.
6. Auckland, New Zealand for termination and return to California. When the aircraft was between Nouméa and Auckland, Ford learned of the attack on Pearl Harbor in Hawaii. He opened his instructions labelled "Plan A" and learned that he was to land at Auckland and await further instructions.

=== Extended points ===
Stops on NC18602's flight from Auckland to New York
1. Auckland: Ford received a message from Flight Operations of Pan American to not return through the war zone but to strip all external identification from his aircraft and to proceed westward as soon as his judgment allowed and return to LaGuardia Field in New York. The plan designed by Ford and his officers was to begin by flying to Sydney, Australia. While preparing for departure, Ford received additional instructions to return to Nouméa and evacuate all Pan American personnel and their families to Gladstone, Queensland, Australia. Ford ordered his crew to suspend stripping the markings from the fuselage and to disassemble two spare engines and to load them onto NC18602 as insurance. The aircraft departed for New Caledonia in the dark.
2. Nouméa: The aircraft landed at Pan American's Nouméa base early in the morning of December 16, 1941. Airline operations had ordered that an additional engine, in a crate, be transported to Karachi, British India. The crew loaded the engine, took on the airline employees and their families, and left for Gladstone later on December 16
3. Gladstone: NC18602 arrived in Gladstone the same day. Ford was disappointed to learn that no 100 octane aviation fuel was available. At Gladstone, First Engineer Rothe recommended that Ford ask two aircraft mechanics who had been assigned to Nouméa to stay with the aircraft until it arrived in New York. Ford offered the mechanics flight pay if they would continue; both agreed. The ground manager at Gladstone managed to find $500 (U.S.) for Ford so the captain would be able to buy supplies.
4. Darwin, Australia: Ford was able to acquire aviation fuel in Darwin but it was stored in cans and had to be manually transferred to the tanks of the aircraft; that task was completed early in the morning of December 18, 1941. Ford taxied into the channel and took off, bound for Surabaya, Netherlands East Indies as the Sun rose.
5. Surabaya: NC18602 was intercepted by aircraft of the Royal Dutch Air Force, which followed the aircraft until Ford landed in a nonthreatening manner. The base had an insufficient supply of aviation fuel to provide the 100 octane product but was able to provide 76 octane automobile gasoline. While the Pan American aircraft was at Surabaya, the surviving aircraft of a U.S. Navy PBY squadron from the Philippines arrived. Before leaving Surabaya, the crew was immunized against typhus, dysentery, and cholera. Ford took off from Surabaya burning their usual 100 octane and switched to the 76 octane after reaching cruising altitude. The engines backfired but kept running. NC18602 proceeded to Trincomalee, Ceylon.
6. Trincomalee: On the way to Trincomalee on December 21, 1941, Ford ordered a descent from the cloud cover to determine the aircraft's location. The crew members saw a Japanese submarine on the surface and Ford ascended to avoid being shot down. At least one round was fired by the submarine but missed the aircraft. Upon arrival in Trincomalee, Ford reported sighting the submarine but the British air wing commander did not believe him. Ford and his crew departed Trincomalee on December 21, 1941, but an engine problem forced him to return to the base in Ceylon. They departed for Karachi, British India on December 26.
7. Karachi: Upon arrival, Ford unloaded the boxed engine that he had been ordered to transport from Nouméa. He also learned that Pan American had ordered one of the two mechanics that had been aboard since Nouméa to remain in Karachi to help establish a maintenance base. Ford's flight engineers told him the variable pitch controller that controlled feathering propellers on one engine was faulty; repair would require at least one day. The base in Karachi did have aviation fuel and Ford was able to refuel with the 100 octane product. After all the tasks were completed, NC18602 departed Karachi early in the morning of December 28.
8. Bahrain: Arriving approximately eight hours after leaving Karachi, Ford was told by the local military commander that only 76 octane fuel was available. He also received instructions to leave the remaining mechanic in Bahrain. When Ford filed his flight plan to his next stop in Khartoum, the British dispatcher told him that his plan took him over the holy city of Mecca, that Saudi Arabians objected to flights over that city, and that he would have to fly north to Kuwait before turning west. Ford agreed, filed an amended plan, and departed in the morning of December 29, 1941. After leaving Bahrain, Ford found sufficient cloud cover and turned west, overflying Mecca enroute to Khartoum.
9. Khartoum, Sudan: Ford successfully landed NC18602 on the Nile River on December 29, 1941, where there was no wharf, and went ashore to confer with the British commander. That commander told him he was being asked to wait until a very important person arrived on a BOAC flight and who required transportation to Léopoldville, Belgian Congo. Ford reluctantly agreed and wait. He did find that 100 octane fuel was available. The "VIP" was revealed to be the wife of a minor British official who had inveigled her way onto a VIP list; she was never identified. During takeoff on January 1, 1942, a portion of the exhaust stack on one of the engines dislodged, producing noise and smoke; Ford decided the risk was acceptable and proceeded to Léopoldville.
10. Léopoldville: Upon landing at the Pan American base, Ford and his crew prepared for the longest leg of their journey, mostly over water of 3100 nautical miles. Taking off required moving downriver toward the Congo Gorges. Ford managed to get NC18602 into the air while dangerously overheating the aircraft's engines. Once airborne, Ford and his crew headed west toward Natal, Brazil. During the flight, which lasted almost 48 hours, Ford used a portion of his fuel reserve because he had to navigate around weather systems. NC18602 landed without incident in Natal.
11. Natal: Upon landing, Ford was told by the base manager that his arrival was expected. Ford's crew was well rested and Ford wanted to refuel and to depart for Port of Spain as soon as possible. The manager told him that refueling could be quickly completed but added that new health regulations required that the interior of the aircraft be sprayed for mosquitoes to control an outbreak of yellow fever and remained sealed for one hour. The flight engineers attempted a repair of the exhaust stack. After takeoff from Natal, the exhaust stack repair failed and the crew learned that the safe on the flight deck had been opened and papers and money had been taken. The assessment was that the exterminators were spies and had taken the objects; this was never confirmed.
12. Port of Spain, Trinidad and Tobago: The crew got some needed rest after landing. Pan American mechanics completed a repair that lasted on the exhaust stack. In the afternoon of January 5, 1942, NC18602 took off for the final leg of its journey to New York.
13. New York: NC18602 arrived in New York before dawn on January 6, 1942. The aircraft was required to remain aloft until the sky was light enough for them to safely use the seaplane channel. After landing, the aircraft struck a sandbar while taxiing; it was undamaged.

Ford and his crew successfully flew over 20,000 miles (32,000 km) from Auckland to New York.

=== Post-mission debriefings ===
Ford was debriefed by the Chief of Naval Operations. He reported spotting the Japanese submarine near Sri Lanka and his encounter with the crews of the Navy PBYs.

== Aftermath ==
After the aircraft had completed its harrowing flight to safety, Pan American renamed the aircraft the Pacific Clipper. The name change was mainly for publicity purposes, arising from the first newspaper articles having wrongly identified the aircraft.

On 30/31 January 1942, the Pacific Clipper transported Under Secretary of State Sumner Welles from the Pan-American emergency defense conference at Rio de Janeiro to Miami, covering the 4,350 miles in a record 33 hours. The black and grey camouflaged ship carried 39 passengers.

After the war, in 1946, it was sold to Universal Airlines but was damaged in a storm and ultimately salvaged for parts in 1951.

== Aircraft identification ==
It has been suggested that two aircraft might have been involved in the extended flight: NC18606 from California to Hawaii and NC18602 from Hawaii to New York. However, records indicate the only two B314s were in the Pacific when the Japanese attacked Pearl Harbor. NC18602 was enroute to Auckland from Pearl. NC18611 was inbound to Pearl Harbor with about an hour of flight time remaining; it diverted to Hilo, Hawaii and returned to California after dark.

An article in the Chicago Tribune placed two other clippers in the Pacific in December 1941, identifying them as the Hong Kong Clipper and the Philippine Clipper. The Hong Kong Clipper may have been a Sikorsky S-42 registered as NC16735; the Philippine Clipper may have been a Martin M-130 registered as NC14715.

== Bibliography ==
- Bowers, Peter M. (November 1977a). "The Great Clippers, Part I". Airpower. Vol. 7, no. 6.
- Bowers, Peter M. (December 1977b). "The Great Clippers, Part II". Wings. Vol. 7, no. 6.
- Bridgeman, Leonard (1946). "The Boeing 314-A Clipper". Jane's Fighting Aircraft of World War II. London: Studio. ISBN 1-85170-493-0.
- Brock, Horace (1978). Flying the Oceans: A Pilot's Story of Pan Am, 1935–1955 (3rd ed.). New York: Jason Aronson, Inc. ISBN 0-87668-632-3.
- Dover, Ed (2008). The Long Way Home: A Journey Into History with Captain Robert Ford (Paperback). Ed Dover. ISBN 9780615214726.
- Klaás, M.D. (June 1969). "The Incredible Clippers". Air Classics. Vol. 5, no. 5.
- Klaás, M.D. (December 1989). "Clipper Across the Pacific, Part One". Air Classics. Vol. 25, no. 12.
- Klaás, M.D. (January 1990). "Clipper Across the Pacific, Part Two". Air Classics. Vol. 26, no. 1.
- Klaás, M.D. (April 1991). "When the Clippers Went to War". Air Classics. Vol. 27, no. 4.
- Klaás, M.D. (February 1993). "Clipper Flight 9035". Air Classics. Vol. 29, no. 2.
