= HMS Aimwell =

Favourite-class tugboat of the Royal Navy

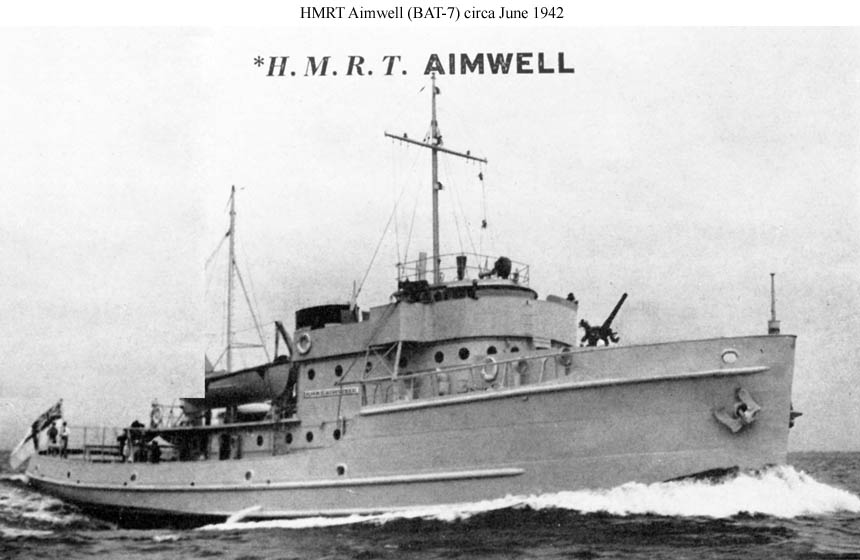

History

United Kingdom
- Builder: Defoe Shipbuilding Company, Bay City, Michigan
- Launched: 8 April 1942
- Commissioned: 6 June 1942
- Stricken: 1 May 1946
- Fate: Returned to US Navy, transferred to merchant service in 1948, mined in Mekong River, 1975

General characteristics
- Displacement: 852 tons light
- Length: 143 ft (44 m)
- Beam: 33 ft 4 in (10.16 m) (extreme)
- Draught: 13 ft 2 in (4.01 m) (limiting)
- Propulsion: one General Motors Diesel-electric model 12-278A single Fairbanks Morse Main Reduction Gear Ship's Service Generators one Diesel-drive 60 kW 120 V D.C. one Diesel-drive 30 kW 120 V D.C. single propeller, 1,500shp
- Speed: 13 knots (24 km/h; 15 mph)
- Complement: 45
- Armament: 1 × 3"/50 caliber gun; 2 × single 20mm AA guns

HMS Aimwell (W 113) was a Favourite-class tugboat of the Royal Navy during the Second World War.

== Service history ==
Aimwell was laid down on 15 November 1941 at the Defoe Shipbuilding Company in Bay City, Michigan, as BAT-7. She was delivered to the United States Navy and was transferred to the Royal Navy under the Lend-Lease Act on 6 June 1942. HMRT Aimwell was visited by Franklin D. Roosevelt on 26 January 1943, when Roosevelt was returning from the Casablanca Conference. The tug was stationed with West Africa Command between 1942 and 1943. She returned to American custody postwar on 30 March 1946. BAT-7 was struck on 1 May 1946 and sold to Moller on 6 January 1948. Renamed Patricia Moller, she was again renamed Golden Cape in 1952 and finally sold in 1971 to the Luzon Stevedoring Corporation. She was renamed Hawkeye and was mined and sunk in the Mekong on 3 February 1975.
