= 1943 in aviation =

This is a list of aviation-related events from 1943:

== Events ==
- Watanabe Iron Works transfers its aircraft manufacturing business to a new subsidiary, the Kyushu Airplane Company Ltd.

=== January ===
- January 3 – Thrown clear of the B-17F Flying Fortress Snap! Crackle! Pop! without a parachute as the plane is shot down over Saint-Nazaire, France, United States Army Air Forces Staff Sergeant Alan Magee survives a 22,000-foot (6,700-meter) fall which culminates in him crashing through the glass roof of the Saint-Nazaire railroad station. He becomes a prisoner of war.
- January 5 – In support of the American occupation of Amchitka in the Aleutian Islands scheduled for the next day, United States Army Air Forces aircraft fly photographic reconnaissance missions over Amchitka and strike Japanese forces on Attu and Kiska, sinking two fully loaded Japanese transports approaching Attu and Kiska.
- January 6 – Firing at a Japanese Aichi D3A dive bomber (Allied reporting name "Val") south of Guadalcanal, the United States Navy light cruiser USS Helena claims the first hit on an enemy aircraft by antiaircraft ammunition employing the Mark 32 VT proximity fuse.
- January 13
  - The U.S. Army Air Forces activate the Thirteenth Air Force in New Caledonia.
  - Operating from Guadalcanal, United States Marine Corps Major Joe Foss shoots down three Japanese Mitsubishi A6M Zero fighters, bringing his victory total to 26, all scored since October 13, 1942; he is the first American to match Eddie Rickenbacker's World War I score of 26. Although Foss never shoots down another plane, his total is enough to make him the second-highest-scoring Marine Corps ace in history and the highest-scoring one to score all of his victories while in Marine Corps service.
- January 14–15 (overnight) – Royal Air Force Bomber Command begins an area-bombing campaign against ports in France in an effort to attack German submarines and their bases there.
- January 14
  - The Casablanca Conference, where Franklin D. Roosevelt becomes the first president of the United States to travel by airplane while in office (Miami, Florida to French Morocco to meet with Winston Churchill to discuss World War II).
  - Aircraft carrier USS Independence is commissioned in the United States.
- January 15 – A Douglas C-54-DO Skymaster flying from the United States to the Casablanca Conference Morocco and operated by Transcontinental & Western Air on behalf of U.S. Army Air Forces Air Transport Command, disintegrates in mid-air for undetermined reasons and crashes in the jungle near Reynsdorp, Surinam, 40 kilometers (25 mi) east-northeast of Paramaribo, killing all 35 people aboard. The English novelist and screenwriter Eric Knight, creator of the fictional collie Lassie, is among the dead.
- January 16–17 (overnight) – British bombing accuracy is poor in a raid on Berlin, which is beyond the range of the Gee and Oboe navigation aids. British bomber losses are small. Target indicator bombs are used for the first time.
- January 17–18 (overnight) – 188 British bombers attack Berlin, with poor accuracy. The Germans expect a return visit to Berlin and put up a better defence; the British lose 22 bombers, a very high 11.8 percent loss rate.
- January 21 – The Commander Submarine Force, U.S. Pacific Fleet, Rear Admiral Robert H. English, and all 18 others aboard are killed in the crash of Pan American World Airways Flight 1104, the Martin M-130 flying boat Philippine Clipper, into a mountain near Ukiah, California.
- January 23 – The pilot of a Japanese Nakajima A6M2-N (Allied reporting name "Rufe") floatplane fighter discovers that American forces have occupied Amchitka. Japanese aircraft from Kiska begin frequent raids against Amchitka that day and continue them for almost four weeks.
- January 24–25 – German aircraft attack Convoy JW 52 while it is en route the Kola Inlet in the Soviet Union via the Barents Sea but cause no damage.
- January 26
  - Three U.S. Army Air Forces B-24 Liberators of the Seventh Air Force make the 704-nautical-mile (1,304 km) flight from Funafuti to bomb Tarawa Atoll, where they discover a new Japanese airfield on the island of Betio.
  - A plane carrying Major General Nathan F. Twining, the commander of the U.S. Army Air Forces' Thirteenth Air Force, ditches near the New Hebrides during a flight from Guadalcanal to Espiritu Santo. Twining and 14 others will spend six days in life rafts before they are rescued.
- January 27
  - The U.S. Army Air Forces make their first daylight bombing raid on Germany, hitting the naval facilities in Wilhelmshaven.
  - The Soviet Union cancels the Polikarpov I-185 program.
- January 27–28 – For the first time, Oboe-equipped British Mosquitos leading the way for a British raid on Düsseldorf drop ground markers rather than sky markers to guide follow-on Pathfinder aircraft, clearly improving British night-bombing accuracy over that experienced before.
- January 28
  - The Japanese begin to use their new airfield on Betio.
  - A U.S. Army Air Forces P-40 Warhawk fighter squadron begins operations from Amchitka, the first Allied aircraft to do so. They intercept attacking Japanese aircraft for the first time the following day, shooting down both attacking "Rufes".
- January 29–30 – In the last naval battle of the Guadalcanal campaign, the Battle of Rennell Island, Japanese land-based Mitsubishi G4M (Allied reporting name "Betty") torpedo bombers attack a U.S. convoy bound for Guadalcanal while it is steaming east of Rennell Island in the southeastern Solomon Islands. They sink the U.S. Navy heavy cruiser USS Chicago.
- January 30
  - Royal Air Force de Havilland Mosquitos make the first daylight air raid on Berlin.
  - Construction of the incomplete and much-delayed German aircraft carrier Graf Zeppelin is halted for the last time.
- January 30–31 (overnight) – In a raid on Hamburg, Germany, Royal Air Force bombers use the H2S radar for navigation operationally for the first time.
- January 31
  - Piloting one of eight United States Marine Corps F4F-4 Wildcat fighters escorting 12 SBD-3 Dauntless dive bombers attacking Japanese shipping off Kolombangara, First Lieutenant Jefferson J. DeBlanc shoots down two Imperial Japanese Navy Mitsubishi F1M2 (Allied reporting name "Pete") floatplanes before Imperial Japanese Army Air Force Nakajima Ki-43 Hayabusa ("peregrine falcon"; Allied reporting name "Oscar") fighters attack. During the ensuring dogfight, DeBlanc and fellow Wildcat pilot Staff Sergeant James A. Feliton use Thach Weave tactics that allow DeBlanc to shoot down two Ki-43s. After Feliton is shot down, DeBlanc downs another Ki-43 – his fifth victory of the day – before being shot down himself. Japanese ace Takeo Takahashi receives credit for downing both Wildcats. DeBlanc and Feliton parachute into Vella Gulf, swim to Kolombangara, are rescued by coastwatchers, and return to their base on Guadalcanal on February 12. DeBlanc will receive the Medal of Honor for the flight.
  - Bad weather has so restricted operations of the U.S. Army Air Forces' Eleventh Air Force during the January that it has dropped only 10 1/2 tonnes (10,500 kg) of bombs on Japanese bases in the Aleutian Islands during the month and lost eleven aircraft, none to enemy action.

=== February ===
- February – Nine months after the Amerikabomber aircraft design competition's proposal documents arrive in Hermann Goering's offices there, the Nazi German Reich Air Ministry states to the Heinkel firm during this month, that the only developments of their firm's operational Heinkel He 177A heavy bomber they would approve funding for "further development" of were the He 177A-5, A-6 and A-7 subtypes, and for the firm's entirely separate, 8–277 airframe design project; ordering a trio of four-engined, 8–277 airframed prototypes and ten service test airframes in the spring of 1943 for what would soon become Heinkel's entry in the Amerikabomber trans-Atlantic range strategic bomber design competition.
- February 1
  - Major General Nathan F. Twining, the commander of the U.S. Army Air Forces' Thirteenth Air Force, and 14 others are rescued from life rafts near the New Hebrides. Their plane had ditched six days earlier during a flight from Guadalcanal to Espiritu Santo.
  - The Messerschmitt Bf 109 of Luftwaffe ace Erich Paczia – probably already dead – collides with the U.S. Army Air Forces B-17F Flying Fortress All-American over Tunisia, slicing off the bomber's left horizontal stabilizer and elevator and leaving the tail section connected to the rest of the aircraft only by a few longerons and a narrow strip of aluminum skin. Despite the damage, the B-17F's pilot, Lieutenant Kendrick Bragg, lands it safely at Biskra, Algeria, without injury to anyone on board. All-American is repaired and later returns to action.
- February 3 – While shooting down a British Halifax bomber, German night fighter ace Reinhold Knacke is himself shot down and killed by one of the Halifax's gunners. The first of three out of Germany's top four night fighter aces to die during the month, his score stands at 44, all at night, when he is killed.
- February 3–4 (overnight) – 263 British bombers attack Hamburg, Germany; 16 are shot down, mostly by Messerschmitt Bf 110 night fighters of Nachtjagdgeschwader 1.
- February 4 – The Casablanca directive directs the Royal Air Force and the United States Army Air Forces to accomplish the "progressive destruction and dislocation of the German military, industrial, and economic system and the undermining of the morale of the German people to a point where their capacity for armed resistance is fatally weakened." It also establishes bombing priorities, notably including German submarine construction yards and oil plants and the German aircraft industry and transportation system.
- February 6–15 – Royal Air Force Coastal Command and the U.S. Army Air Forces Antisubmarine Command carry out Operation Gondola over the Bay of Biscay to test the theory that every German submarine transiting an interdicted area could be attacked at least once by Allied aircraft if they flew in sufficient numbers day and night. Aircraft of the two commands fly a combined 2,260 flight hours during the operation.
- February 9 – Shortly after takeoff from West Palm Beach, Florida, for a flight to North Africa via the Azores, a U.S. Army Air Forces C-87 Liberator Express cargo aircraft begins to experience severe vibration. The pilot turns around and attempts to fly to Miami, Florida, for an emergency landing, but 10 miles (16 km) short of Miami the vibration becomes so severe that he orders the crew to bail out over the Atlantic Ocean, where six of the eight men are later rescued. On automatic pilot, the unmanned C-87 then climbs to altitude, flies 1,300 miles (2,100 km) across Florida and the Gulf of Mexico to Zaragoza, Mexico, in 4½ hours, and circles over Zaragoza for two more hours before crashing into a mountain.
- February 10 – A U.S. Army Air Forces Antisubmarine Command B-24D Liberator sinks a German submarine, apparently U-519, in the North Atlantic Ocean, the first submarine sunk by the command.
- February 13 – First combat mission of the Vought F4U Corsair, when Guadalcanal-based Marine Fighter Squadron 124 (VMF-124) Corsairs escort U.S. Army Air Forces B-24 Liberator bombers on a raid against Kahili Airfield on Bougainville. They encounter no enemy aircraft.
- February 14 – The first combat action of the F4U Corsair occurs, when 50 Imperial Japanese Navy A6M Zero fighters attack a formation of American bombers and their escorting fighters. In what the Americans call the "St. Valentine's Day Massacre", the Japanese shoot down two U.S. Marine Corps Corsairs and eight U.S. Army Air Forces aircraft – two P-40s, four P-38s, and two B-24s – losing three Zeroes in exchange.
- February 15 – Convoy JW 53 departs Loch Ewe, Scotland, for the Kola Inlet in the Soviet Union. The British aircraft carrier HMS Dasher escorts it, but must turn back after only two days due to damage incurred during bad weather. No aircraft carrier escorts an Arctic convoy again until February 1944.
- February 17 – U.S. Army Air Forces Seventh Air Force aircraft on a photographic reconnaissance mission discover a large Japanese seaplane base at Butaritari at Tarawa Atoll.
- February 18
  - The second completed Boeing B-29 Superfortress heavy bomber catches fire in the air and crashes into a building just north of Boeing Field in Seattle, Washington, killing all ten aboard the plane – including famed Boeing test pilot Edmund "Eddie" Allen – and 19 or 20 people on the ground.
  - Japanese aircraft raid Amchitka in the Aleutian Islands for the last time.
- February 19 – Chief of Naval Operations Admiral Ernest J. King places the responsibility for the development of the helicopter in the United States Department of the Navy under the United States Coast Guard.
- February 22 – A Pan American Airways Boeing 314A Clipper flying boat (registration NC18603) on a United Service Organizations flight crashes near Lisbon, Portugal, when its left wing hits the water of the Tagus while it turns on descent to a landing at Lisbon. Twenty-five of the 39 people on board die, including American novelist, journalist, and war correspondent Ben Robertson and the Russian-born American singer and actress Tamara Drasin. Also on the plane is American actress Jane Froman, who had exchanged seats with Drasin and survives with serious injuries.
- February 24 – The second of three top German night fighter aces to die during the month, Paul Gildner, is killed in a crash after an electrical failure aboard his Messerschmitt Bf 110. Like Reinhold Knacke, who died earlier in the month, he has 44 night victories when he dies; his overall score is 48 kills.
- February 25–26 – German aircraft attack Convoy JW 53 during its voyage from Loch Ewe, Scotland, to Molotovsk in the Soviet Union via the Barents Sea, causing no damage.
- February 26 – Soviet troops shoot down the Fieseler Fi 156 Storch of German Nazi SS-Obergruppenführer Theodor Eicke near Lozovaya in the Soviet Union's Ukrainian Soviet Socialist Republic while he is conducting a battlefield reconnaissance during the opening stages of the Third Battle of Kharkov, killing Eicke and the other two men on board.
- February 28 – Aircraft of the U.S. Army Air Forces' Eleventh Air Force have dropped 150 tonnes (150,000 kg) of bombs on Japanese bases in the Aleutian Islands during the month, although half of their sorties have suffered from icy and corroded bomb racks that fail to release bombs.

=== March ===
- Consolidated Aircraft Corporation and Vultee Aircraft Inc. merge to form Consolidated Vultee Aircraft, soon unofficially, and later officially, known as Convair.
- The Aichi Clock and Electric Company Ltd. forms a separate firm, Aichi Aircraft Company, to take over its aircraft and aircraft engine business.
- March 1
  - Since January 14, Royal Air Force Bomber Command has launched major raids on Wilhelmshaven four times, Berlin, Cologne, and Hamburg three times each, and Bremen, Düsseldorf, and Nuremberg once each, as well as on Milan and Turin.
  - RAF Coastal Command first deploys ASV Mark III radar.
- March 1–2 (overnight) – Royal Air Force Bomber Command flies the last raid of its early 1943 campaign against German submarines and their bases in France. It has attacked Lorient nine times and Brest once since the start of the campaign on January 14, but found German submarine pens impervious to its bombs. The raids have caused much damage to the French cities and their residents.
- March 2–5 – In the Battle of the Bismarck Sea, U.S. Army Air Forces and Royal Australian Air Force aircraft attack a convoy of eight Japanese cargo ships escorted by eight destroyers carrying troops from Rabaul, New Britain, to Lae, New Guinea, as it transits an unnamed body of water soon to be named the Bismarck Sea. For the loss of five aircraft, they sink all eight cargo ships and four of the destroyers, damage the other four destroyers, and shoot down 20 to 30 Japanese fighters attempting to provide air defense. About 3,000 Japanese troops are killed.
- March 5
  - Twelve German Heinkel He 111 bombers attack Convoy RA-53 during its voyage from Murmansk in the Soviet Union to Loch Ewe, Scotland, but cause no damage.
  - In the North Atlantic Ocean, the first U.S. Navy antisubmarine hunter-killer group begins combat operations, centered on the escort carrier USS Bogue and the aircraft of Composite Squadron 9 (VC-9) embarked aboard her.
- March 5–6 (overnight) – Royal Air Force Bomber Command begins a bombing campaign against the Ruhr area of Germany with an Oboe-marked raid on Essen. Known as the Battle of the Ruhr, it will last until mid-July. The first raid destroys 53 buildings in the Krupp complex and destroys 160 acres (65 ha) of Essen.
- March 10
  - The U.S. Army Air Forces activate the Fourteenth Air Force in China.
  - The first combat mission of the U.S. Army Air Forces Republic P-47 Thunderbolt takes place, a fighter sweep by England-based 4th Fighter Group P-47s over France. They encounter no enemy aircraft.
- March 12–13 (overnight) – The second Royal Air Force Bomber Command raid on Essen during the Battle of the Ruhr is even more destructive than the first one of March 5–6.
- March 20 – During the evening, aircraft drop naval mines for the first time in the Pacific, when 42 U.S. Navy and U.S. Marine Corps TBF Avengers from Henderson Field, Guadalcanal, mine the harbor at Kahili, Bougainville, during a diversionary raid on Kahili Airfield by 18 U.S. Army Air Forces B-17 Flying Fortresses. The following evening, 40 Avengers carry out another mining operation at Kahili during a diversionary raid by 21 U.S. Army Air Forces bombers on the airfield.
- March 27
  - The British escort carrier HMS Dasher suffers a massive accidental internal explosion and sinks off the Isle of Arran in the Firth of Clyde, killing 379. There are 149 survivors.
  - The German Luftwaffe decides to discontinue development of the Heinkel He 280 jet fighter.
- March 28 – 57 Japanese Rabaul-based aircraft – 18 Aichi D3A (Allied reporting name "Val") dive bombers and 37 Mitsubishi A6M Zeros – attack Allied shipping in Oro Bay off New Guinea, sinking a United States Army transport and a Dutch merchant ship.
- March 31
  - After Imperial Japanese Army Air Service 64th Sentai Nakajima Ki-43 Hayabusa ("Peregrine Falcon," Allied reporting name "Oscar") fighters set a United States Army Air Forces 7th Bombardment Group B-24 Liberator on fire over Burma and its crew bails out, the Japanese pilots begin attacking the B-24 crewmen as they parachute to earth. Second Lieutenant Owen J. Baggett plays dead in his parachute, but when one of the Ki-43s approaches him at low speed with its canopy open, apparently so that its pilot can see if he is dead, Baggett draws an M1911 pistol and fires four shots at the Ki-43's pilot. The Ki-43 stalls and plunges toward the ground. Baggett gains widespread fame as the only person ever to shoot down an enemy aircraft with a handgun, although Japanese records do not indicate the loss of any Japanese aircraft in the action.
  - Since January 1, Royal Air Force Bomber Command has flown 12,760 sorties and lost 348 bombers, a 2.7 percent loss rate. German night fighters have shot down 201 of the bombers.

=== April ===
- Qantas Empire Airways begins the longest scheduled nonstop airline service in history, a 28-hour flight between Perth, Australia, and Ceylon using PBY Catalina flying boats which becomes known as the "Double Sunrise Route" because passengers and crew see two sunrises during the journey. Each flight can carry up to three passengers, who are advised that the flight can take as little as 24 hours or as long as 32 hours.
- April 1 – The Imperial Japanese Navy begins the I Operation, a land-based air offensive over the Solomon Islands and New Guinea, with a fighter sweep by 58 Japanese Mitsubishi A6M Zeroes from Rabaul down New Georgia Sound toward Guadalcanal. Over the Russell Islands, 41 U.S. F4F Wildcats, F4U Corsairs, and P-38 Lightnings intercept them. The Japanese lose 18 Zeros in exchange for six American fighters.
- April 1–2 – U.S. Army Fifth Air Force bombers attack a Japanese convoy bound for Kavieng, sinking a merchant ship and damaging the heavy cruiser Aoba and a destroyer. Aoba is never again capable of steaming at maximum speed.
- April 8 – 177 Japanese Rabaul-based aircraft – 67 Aichi D3A (Allied reporting name "Val") dive bombers escorted by 110 Zeroes – conduct the largest Japanese air attack since the attack on Pearl Harbor, targeting U.S. shipping in Ironbottom Sound off Guadalcanal and Tulagi. They sink a U.S. destroyer, a New Zealand corvette, and a U.S. tanker. Seventy-six U.S. fighters intercept the Japanese, losing seven of their number while shooting down 12 Vals and an estimated 27 Zeroes. U.S. Marine Corps Reserve First Lieutenant James E. Swett shoots down seven Japanese aircraft, all Vals, during his flight.
- April 11 – 94 Japanese Rabaul-based aircraft – 22 Aichi D3As and 72 Mitsubishi A6M Zeroes – attack Allied shipping at Oro Bay off New Guinea, sinking a merchant ship and damaging a merchant ship and a minesweeper. The 50 Allied fighters based at Dobodura, New Guinea, intercept the Japanese, shooting down six Japanese planes without loss to themselves.
- April 12 – The Japanese conduct their largest air raid in the Southwest Pacific thus far in World War II, with 174 planes – 131 fighters and 43 medium bombers – attacking Port Moresby, New Guinea. The raid causes little damage, and the 44 Allied fighters that intercept the Japanese shoot down five aircraft, all fighters, for the loss of two of their own.
- April 14
  - 188 Japanese planes from Rabaul raid Milne Bay, New Guinea, destroying one merchant ship and damaging others. Twenty-four Royal Australian Air Force Curtiss Kittyhawks intercept them, shooting down seven Japanese aircraft in exchange for three Kittyhawks.
  - MV Empire MacAlpine enters service as the first British merchant aircraft carrier, or "MAC-ship". Each of the 19 MAC-ships ultimately placed in service is a bulk cargo ship or tanker which continues to carry cargo while equipped with a full-length flight deck. Steaming within convoys, MAC-ships each operate three or four Swordfish aircraft for antisubmarine patrols. Although no MAC-ship's aircraft ever sink a German submarine, no convoy containing a MAC-ship ever loses a ship, and none of the MAC ships are lost.
- April 15
  - Operation Flax, the systematic targeting by Allied fighter pilots of Luftwaffe transport aircraft bound for North Africa, is put into effect.
  - The first encounter of the U.S. Army Air Forces P-47 Thunderbolt with enemy fighters occurs, as 335th Fighter Squadron P-47Cs shoot down three German fighters in exchange for a loss of three P-47Cs.
  - During a single 12-hour period, the U.S. Army Air Forces' Eleventh Air Force flies 112 sorties against Japanese bases in the Aleutian Islands, dropping 180,000 pounds (82,000 kg) of bombs on Kiska and 4,000 pounds (1,800 kg) on Attu.
- April 16 – Believing they had sunk a cruiser, two destroyers, and 25 transports and shot down 175 Allied aircraft, the Japanese end the I Operation air offensive. Actual Allied losses have been one destroyer, one tanker, one corvette, and two cargo ships sunk and about 25 planes shot down.
- April 18 – Precisely one year after the Doolittle Raid, Admiral Isoroku Yamamoto, Commander-in-Chief of the Imperial Japanese Navy's Combined Fleet, is killed when the Mitsubishi G4M (Allied reporting name "Betty") in which he is riding as a passenger, T1-323, is ambushed and shot down by U.S. Army Air Forces P-38 Lightning fighters over Bougainville in Operation Vengeance. The attacking P-38s also shoot down an accompanying Betty – critically injuring Yamamoto's chief of staff, Vice Admiral Matome Ugaki – and three out of six Zero fighters escorting them. One P-38 is shot down.
- April 20 – Led personally by the commander of the Seventh Air Force, Major General Willis H. Hale, 22 U.S. Army Air Forces B-24 Liberators from Funafuti bomb and photograph Nauru. Japanese aircraft follow them home and attack Funafuti early on April 21, destroying two B-24s and killing six men.
- April 21 – Since the second week of April, the U.S. Army Air Force's Eleventh Air Force has raided Kiska 83 times.
- April 23 – Seventh Air Force B-24 Liberators bomb Tarawa Atoll.
- April 26–27 (overnight) – The British employ Ground Grocer, the first device capable of jamming the airborne, UHF-band early version of the Lichtenstein B/C radar employed by German night fighters of the time. Ground-based, Ground Grocer's range is limited by the curvature of the Earth, placing most German night fighter operations below its coverage.
- April 27 – Wing Commander Hugh Malcolm of the Royal Air Force is awarded the Victoria Cross posthumously for his actions during the North African campaign.
- April 28 – United States Army Air Forces Major General Robert Olds, an outspoken advocate of strategic bombing and an independent United States Air Force and the father of World War II and Vietnam War ace Brigadier General Robin Olds, dies at Tucson, Arizona.
- April 30 – In preparation for the upcoming American invasion of Attu, the U.S. Army Air Forces' Eleventh Air Force has flown 1,175 combat sorties against Japanese bases in the Aleutian Islands during April, including a two-week period in which 60 aircraft per day attack Kiska.

=== May ===
- Oberleutnant Rudolf Schoenert, piloting a Messerschmitt Bf 110 night fighter, uses Schräge Musik ("Jazz Music") – automatic cannon mounted to fire obliquely upward and forward – to shoot down an enemy bomber for the first time. Officially adopted by the Luftwaffe in June, Schräge Musik will become a devastating German anti-bomber weapon during the second half of 1943. (Also see the May 21 entry for its debut use by Japan.)
- The United States Department of the Navy begins development of the helicopter as an antisubmarine warfare platform, with the United States Coast Guard leading the effort at Coast Guard Air Station Brooklyn in Brooklyn, New York.
- May 1–7 – The U.S. Army Air Forces' Eleventh Air Force drops 200,000 pounds (90,719 kg) of bombs on Japanese forces on Attu in the Aleutian Islands in support of the upcoming American invasion of the island.
- May 8
  - A 60-plane U.S. strike from Henderson Field, Guadalcanal, sinks two Japanese destroyers and badly damages a third off Kolombangara.
  - Allied aircraft begin a bombing campaign against Pantelleria, the first of 5,285 sorties they will fly against the island before it is invaded on June 11.
- May 9 – A German night fighter crew defects to the United Kingdom, flying a Junkers Ju 88R-1 there. The defection gives British scientists and tacticians access to an FuG 202 Lichtenstein B/C UHF-band airborne interception radar for the first time, compromising the secrets of the early B/C UHF-band version of the radar. The Ju 88R-1 which is still in the United Kingdom in the 21st century.
- May 10 – British Overseas Airways Corporation introduces its first female flight attendant, Rosamond Gilmour, on a Bristol (Whitchurch)–Shannon feeder flight.
- May 11 – In Operation Landcrab, American forces invade Attu. With an all-F4F Wildcat airwing consisting of 26 F4F-4 fighters and three F4F-3P photographic reconnaissance aircraft, the escort carrier USS Nassau supports operations on Attu until May 20; it is the first time that the U.S. Navy employs carrier-based photographic reconnaissance aircraft and the first time in the Pacific Theater of Operations that an escort carrier engages in combat. The U.S. Navy concludes that bombers should be included in future escort carrier air wings to make them more effective in supporting amphibious operations.
- May 13
  - Twenty Japanese Mitsubishi G4M (Allied reporting name "Betty") torpedo bombers fly from Paramushiro to attack American ships off Attu, but bad weather forces them to turn back without launching an attack.
  - The Venezuelan airline Avensa is founded. It will begin flights in December.
- May 15 – Luftwaffe ace Leutnant Horst Hannig is killed when his parachute fails to open after he bails out of his Focke-Wulf Fw 190 over France during combat with fighters of the Royal Air Force's No. 611 Squadron that are attacking Caen-Carpiquet Airdrome and Poix Airdrome. He is credited with 98 aerial victories.
- May 17–18 – Specially modified RAF Avro Lancasters of 617 Squadron, Royal Air Force, make the "Dambusters" raids on the Möhne, Eder, and Sorpe dams.
- May 19 – The B-17F Flying Fortress Memphis Belle returns to England from a raid on Kiel, Germany, becoming the first American heavy bomber to complete 25 missions with its crew intact. Memphis Belle and her crew return to the United States in June to promote the sale of war bonds.
- May 21 – In the first use of upward-firing cannon by a Japanese aircraft, an Imperial Japanese Navy Nakajima J1N (Allied reporting name "Irving") twin-engined night fighter uses upward-firing 20-mm Type 99 cannon in downing two U.S. Army Air Forces B-17 Flying Fortresses. Japanese Navy Commander Yasuna Kozono had conceived of the upward-firing cannon arrangement independently of the similar German Schräge Musik weapons fit.
- May 22
  - A U.S. Navy antisubmarine hunter-killer group scores a kill of an enemy submarine for the first time, when TBM Avengers of Composite Squadron 9 (VC-9) from the escort carrier USS Bogue sink the German submarine U-569 in the North Atlantic Ocean. Aircraft of U.S. hunter-killer groups will sink – or cooperate with surface warships in sinking – 31 more Kriegsmarine and two IJN submarines – likely both the German-built RO-501 of the IJN and I-52, on separate yanagi missions – in the Atlantic during World War II.
  - 19 Mitsubishi G4M "Betty" torpedo bombers based at Paramushiro make the only Japanese air strike of the Battle of Attu, attacking the U.S. Navy destroyer USS Phelps and gunboat USS Charleston off Attu. They lose two aircraft and score no hits.
- May 23 – An aircraft sinks an enemy submarine with air-to-surface rockets for the first time, as a Fairey Swordfish from the British escort carrier HMS Archer sinks the German submarine U-752 in the Atlantic.
- May 25–26 (overnight) – 759 British bombers attack Düsseldorf, Germany. Pathfinder aircraft fail to concentrate markers on the target, and the raid fails when the bombers spread their bombs widely throughout the countryside.
- May 29
  - A merchant aircraft carrier, or "MAC-ship", puts to sea with a convoy for the first time as MV Empire MacAlpine sets out from the United Kingdom with Convoy ONS 59 bound for Halifax, Nova Scotia, Canada. She carries four Swordfish aircraft of No. 836 Squadron.
  - Japanese resistance on Attu ends.

=== June ===
- June 1
  - Allied aircraft begin a final period of heavy bombing of Pantelleria during the ten days prior to the scheduled invasion of the island, during which they will fly 3,647 sorties.
  - German Junkers Ju 88 fighters shoot down a Douglas DC-3 airliner operating as BOAC Flight 777 during its flight from Lisbon, Portugal, to the United Kingdom. All 17 people on board die, including actor Leslie Howard.
- June 2 – American former college football star and Heisman Trophy winner Nile Kinnick, a United States Naval Reserve fighter pilot, dies when he ditches his Grumman F4F Wildcat fighter after it develops a serious oil leak over the Gulf of Paria off Venezuela during a training flight from the aircraft carrier USS Lexington. His body is never found.
- June 5 – In a battle over the Russell Islands between 81 Japanese Mitsubishi A6M Zero fighters and 110 Allied aircraft, the Japanese lose 24 aircraft in exchange for seven U.S. fighters.
- June 6–9 – Allied aircraft drop an average of 600 tons (544,316 kg) of bombs per day on Pantelleria.
- June 10
  - In one of the heaviest and most concentrated air attacks thus far in World War II, Allied aircraft drop 1,571 tons (1,425,202 kg) of bombs on Pantelleria.
  - The Pointblank Directive modifies the priorities established by the February Casablanca directive, elevating attacks on German fighter strength to the highest priority for the Royal Air Force and United States Army Air Forces.
- June 11 – Demoralized by heavy aerial bombing and naval surface bombardment, the Italian garrison on Pantellaria surrenders almost as soon as Allied ground forces land on the island. Pantelleria arguably is the first ground captured by air power almost alone. Allied aircraft have also shot down 57 Axis aircraft since beginning operations against Pantelleria in May, losing 14 of their own.
- June 11–12 (overnight) – 783 British bombers attack Düsseldorf, killing 1,326 people, injuring 2,600, and leaving 13 missing and 140,000 homeless. Fires burn 25 square miles (65 square kilometers) of the city and there are 180 major building collapses. During the raid, the German Heinkel He 219 Uhu ("Eagle Owl") night fighter makes its combat debut in the early morning hours of June 12 in an experimental flight piloted by Major Werner Streib. Streib shoots down five British bombers – a Lancaster and four Halifaxes – in a single sortie, but his He 219 is wrecked in a landing accident when he returns to base.
- June 12 – Another large dogfight between Japanese and Allied aircraft over the Russell Islands yields almost identical results to those of June 5.
- June 14 – The B-17C Flying Fortress Miss Every Morning Fixin (40–2072) crashes at Bakers Creek, Queensland, Australia, killing 40 of the 41 servicemen on board. It remains the worst aviation disaster in Australian history, and it is worst aircraft crash in the Southwest Pacific Theater during World War II.
- June 14–15 (overnight) – Accompanying a raid by 197 British Lancaster bombers against Oberhausen, Germany, five British Beaufighter night fighters make the first operational use of Serrate, a radar detector and homing device that allows them to home in on German night fighters employing the Lichtenstein airborne radar from up to 80 km (50 mi) away and intercept them. The Beaufighters do not intercept any German aircraft during the raid, however, and 17 British bombers are lost.
- June 16 – A raid by 94 Japanese aircraft – 24 Aichi D3A (Allied reporting name "Val") dive bombers and 70 Zero fighters – attack U.S. shipping in Ironbottom Sound off Guadalcanal. They damage a cargo ship and a tank landing ship and shoot down six U.S. fighters, but almost all the Japanese aircraft are lost.
- June 20 – The Imperial Japanese Army Air Force raids Winnellie and Darwin in Australia's Northern Territory with a force consisting of 18 Kawasaki Ki-48 (Allied reporting name "Lily") and Nakajima Ki-49 (Allied reporting name "Helen") bombers escorted by 22 Nakajima Ki-43 (Allied reporting name "Oscar") fighters, with the Ki-49s hitting Winnellie and the Ki-48s bombing Winnellie and Darwin. Forty-six Royal Australian Air Force Spitfire Mark V fighters intercept the Japanese. In the ensuring dogfights, the Japanese claim nine Spitfires shot down and six probables and the Australians claim to have shot down nine bombers and five fighters. The actual Japanese losses are one Ki-43 and one Ki-49 shot down and two Ki-48s and one Ki-49 making forced landings upon returning to base, while Australian losses total three losses and two pilots.
- June 21 – The first airbase designed for use by B-29 Superfortress bombers in attacks on Japan, Shemya Army Airfield, opens on Shemya in the Aleutian Islands. However, B-29s instead attack Japan from bases in China and the Mariana Islands, and only one B-29 – on a non-combat flight – visits Shemya during World War II.
- June 21–22 (overnight) – 705 British bombers attack Krefeld, Germany, losing 44 of their number.
- June 22 – In order to better defend Sicily from Allied air attack, Italy and Germany agree to withdraw all of their bombers from Sicily and all but a few from Sardinia, concentrating instead on fighter operations in Sicily and southern Sardinia.
- June 28 – To increase the visibility of the national insignia on its military aircraft, the United States replaces the marking adopted in June 1942 with a new marking consisting of a white star centered in a blue circle flanked by white rectangles, with the entire insignia outlined in red. The new marking containing the red graphic elements will cause confusion with Japanese markings and will remain in use only until September 1943.
- June 28–29 (overnight) – 608 British bombers attack Cologne, Germany, losing 25 of their number. In Cologne, 4,377 people are killed – by far the highest number killed in any single Bomber Command raid so far – 10,000 injured, and 230,000 rendered homeless. In the next two raids, Cologne will incur another 1,000 killed and 120,000 made homeless.
- June 30
  - U.S. forces land on Rendova Island. A sweep by 27 Japanese Zero fighters over the area accomplishes little and almost is wiped out, and 43 U.S. aircraft bomb Munda Airfield. In the evening, a Japanese torpedo strike by 25 Mitsubishi G4Ms (Allied reporting name "Betty") escorted by 24 Zero fighters sinks an attack transport, with 17 of the G4Ms shot down by U.S. Marine Corps Vought F4U Corsairs and antiaircraft fire.
  - While U.S. Army Air Forces ace William F. Fiedler awaits takeoff from Henderson Field on Guadalcanal, a P-38 Lightning suffering from engine failure attempts to land on the same runway. The P-38 collides with Fiedler's Bell P-39 Airacobra, and both planes explode. Pulled unconscious from the wreckage, Fiedler dies in a field hospital a few hours later. With five victories, he is the only American to become an ace in the P-39.
  - Royal Air Force Bomber Command has lost 3,448 aircraft – about 1,600 of them to German night fighters – and about 20,000 aircrewmen on night raids since the beginning of World War II. Since April 1, Bomber Command has lost 762 aircraft, 561 of them to German night fighters.
  - Since November 1, 1942, Italy has lost 2,190 military aircraft and suffered another 1,790 damaged.
  - Since June 1, the U.S. Army Air Forces' Eleventh Air Force has flown 407 sorties against Japanese forces on Kiska in the Aleutian Islands. U.S. Navy PV-1 Venturas have made additional night bombing attacks on the island.

=== July ===
- The British Women's Auxiliary Air Force reaches a peak strength of 182,000.
- July 1 – Municipal authorities in Hamburg, Germany, have logged 137 air attacks on the city and the deaths of 1,387 people and injuries to 4,496 in air raids since the beginning of World War II.
- July 2 – An airstrike on American forces on Rendova Island by 24 Japanese bombers escorted by 48 fighters achieves complete surprise, killing 55 and wounding 77.
- July 2–3 (overnight) – The Allied Northwest African Air Force begins heavy day-and-night attacks against Axis airfields in Sicily, Sardinia, and Italy in preparation for the upcoming invasion of Sicily. Italy claims to fly 650 fighter sorties and Germany 500 between July 1 and 9 in defending against the Allied bombing campaign, but almost all Axis airfields on Sicily are knocked out by the time of the invasion.
- July 3–4 (overnight) – 653 British bombers attack Cologne. During the raid, the Luftwaffe experiments for the first time with Wilde Sau ("Wild Boar") night fighter tactics, in which single-engine day fighters use any illumination – from searchlights, flares, fires, etc., – available over a city to visually identify and attack enemy bombers at night. Wilde Sau pilots and antiaircraft artillery both claim the same 12 bombers shot down over Cologne and officially each receive credit for six. The experiment's success will lead to the formation of Jagdgeschwader 300, which will specialize in Wilde Sau operations.
- July 4
  - Seventeen Japanese bombers escorted by 66 fighters raid Rendova, destroying and damaging several landing craft.
  - The prime minister of the Polish Government-in-Exile and Commander-in-Chief of the Polish Armed Forces, Władysław Sikorski, his chief of staff, Tadeusz Klimecki, and eight others die in the crash of a Liberator II just after takeoff from Gibraltar. Only the aircraft's pilot survives.
- July 6 – A strike by 39 U.S. aircraft destroys a Japanese destroyer beached on Kolombangara island after the Battle of Kula Gulf.
- July 7 – An Imperial Japanese Army Tachikawa Ki-77 takes off from Singapore with a crew of five and three passengers aboard, intending to make a non-stop flight to the German airfield at Sarabus (now Hvardiiske) in the Crimea. It disappears over the Indian Ocean during the flight.
- July 9–10 (overnight) – 160 British Army glider infantrymen land on Sicily's Maddalena Peninsula, seizing coastal artillery batteries, a radio station, and the Ponte Grande bridge in advance of Allied amphibious landings on the morning of July 10.
- July 10
  - Operation Husky, the British and American landings on Sicily, begins; supporting naval forces include the British aircraft carriers HMS Indomitable and HMS Formidable. Axis aircraft attack Allied ships offshore, and a Junkers Ju 87 Stuka dive bomber sinks the American destroyer USS Maddox with the loss of 212 lives. Floatplanes based on American light cruisers provide valuable spotting support for naval gunfire against targets ashore.
  - Six U.S. Army Air Forces B-24 Liberators take off from Attu to fly the 1,300 miles (2,100 km) round-trip to attack the Japanese base at Paramushiro, in what would have been the first Allied air raid against the Kurile Islands; however, they are diverted en route to join B-25 Mitchells in attacking a convoy of Japanese transports, suffering one aircraft damaged before returning to Attu. On the same day a separate formation of eight B-25s on its own initiative attempts to bomb Paramushiro; they bomb an unidentified land mass through overcast without knowing if it is Japan, the Kuriles, the Kamchatka Peninsula, or an unidentified North Pacific island.
- July 11 – Axis aircraft make a second major bombing raid against ships off Sicily, sinking two ammunition ships.
- July 11–12 (overnight) – The U.S. Army Air Forces' 52nd Troop Carrier Wing flies United States Army paratroopers from North Africa for a parachute landing in Sicily. The 144 transport aircraft fly in darkness at low level over Allied ships offshore and Allied troops on the front line, arriving during an Axis bombing attack, and both the ships and troops ashore mistakenly open fire on them. Twenty-three of the aircraft are shot down, with the loss of 100 lives.
- July 12 – Germany and Italy mount all air opposition against Allied forces in Sicily from bases in Sardinia and mainland Italy from this date.
- July 12–13 (midnight) – An attack by the Allied Northwest African Air Force destroys the headquarters of the Italian Sixth Army at Enna, Sicily.
- July 13 – An Axis air attack destroys a Liberty ship off Sicily.
- July 13–14 (overnight)
  - Allied transport aircraft carrying paratroopers from North Africa to Sicily again fly low in darkness over Allied ships and ground forces, and again come under friendly fire. Several are shot down. In Operation Fustian, the British Army's 1st Parachute Brigade land in gliders and capture the Primosole bridge, but a German parachute battalion that previously had landed nearby drives the British off the bridge by the following evening.
  - Royal Air Force Bomber Command flies the last raid of its "Battle of the Ruhr" campaign against the Ruhr region of Germany. Since the campaign began in March, Bomber Command has flown 29 major attacks against the Ruhr and the Rheinland, including five against Essen – which alone suffers 1,037 dead, 3,500 severely injured, and 4,830 homes destroyed – four each against Duisburg and Cologne, three against Bochum, and one or two each against other cities. Bomber Command has lost 672 aircraft during the Ruhr and Rheinland raids, a 4.8 percent loss rate, and 4,400 aviators. Separately, during same period Bomber Command also has flown 18 major attacks against other targets in France, in Italy, and in Germany outside the Ruhr and Rheinland, including two raids on Berlin and strikes against Munich, Stettin, Turin, La Spezia, and the Škoda Works in Pilsen.
- July 14 – Axis torpedo bombers see action against Allied ships for the first time in the Sicily campaign; six Italian torpedo bombers attack two British light cruisers and two British destroyers off Cape Spartivento, scoring no hits.
- July 16 – An Italian torpedo bomber damages the British aircraft carrier HMS Indomitable off Cape Passero, forcing her to proceed to Gibraltar for repairs.
- July 17
  - 223 U.S. Air Solomons (AirSols) aircraft strike Bougainville Island, bombing Kahili Airfield and Tonolei harbor. They sink one Japanese destroyer.
  - Axis air attacks damage Allied shipping off Sicily.
- July 18
  - The U.S. Navy blimp K-74 is shot down by the German submarine U-134, becoming the only airship lost to enemy fire during World War II.
  - Six Eleventh Air Force B-24s make the first confirmed Allied strike against the Kurile Islands, damaging the Japanese base at Paramushiro and claiming a ship sunk without suffering any losses. It is the first time since the Doolittle Raid of April 1942 that Allied aircraft have struck the inner portions of the Japanese Empire.
- July 19 – Soviet Air Forces fighter pilot Yekaterina Budanova is shot down and killed in a dogfight with Messerschmitt Bf 109s over Luhansk Oblast. Although her victory total is unclear, she is commonly credited with 11 kills. She and Soviet pilot Lydia Litvyak are the only two female aces in history.
- July 20 – U.S. aircraft strike the escorts of a Japanese convoy in New Georgia Sound, sinking two destroyers and damaging the heavy cruiser Kumano.
- July 21 – Serving in the U.S. Navy during World War II, American athlete and two-time Olympic champion Charley Paddock dies in the crash of a Navy plane near Sitka in the Territory of Alaska. All five other men on the aircraft also die.
- July 22
  - 46 U.S. bombers attack a Japanese convoy in Bougainville Strait, sinking the seaplane carrier Nisshin.
  - An Avro Lancaster bomber converted for use as a transport aircraft inaugurates the Canadian Government's Trans Atlantic Air Service, operated by Trans-Canada Air Lines. It sets a non-stop speed record for a flight from Dorval Airport, Montreal, Quebec, Canada, to Prestwick, Scotland, of 12 hours 26 minutes.
- July 23 – The Consolidated Vultee firm receives a "letter of intent" from the USAAF, requesting the construction of the first 100 production Convair B-36 bombers. – on the same day in Germany, the Heinkel firm is ordered by the RLM to create a wing design for its 8–277 bomber airframe concept, competing since February 1943 as its Amerikabomber aircraft design competition entry, to take either four Junkers Jumo 222 or six BMW 801 engines.
- July 24–25 (overnight) – 791 British bombers attack Hamburg, Germany, beginning Operation Gomorrah or the "Battle of Hamburg", a systematic effort by Bomber Command chief Air Marshal Arthur Harris to destroy the city. For the first time, the Royal Air Force uses chaff, codenamed "Window", to foil German radar. About 1,500 people are killed, more than in all 137 previous air attacks on the city combined. Twelve British bombers are lost.
- July 25
  - U.S. Army Fifth Air Force B-25 Mitchell bombers destroy two Japanese destroyers aground on a reef near Cape Gloucester, New Britain.
  - 100 U.S. Army Eighth Air Force bombers attack Hamburg.
- July 25–26 (overnight) – 705 British bombers attack Essen, Germany, causing considerable damage to the Krupp works. Twenty-six British aircraft do not return. German night fighter pilot Major Werner Streib shoots down four bombers in 74 minutes, and his final kill of the night is the 88th and last one credited to his ground controller, Oberleutnant Walter Knickmaier.
- July 26
  - 60 U.S. Eighth Air Force bombers strike Hamburg.
  - Over 100 German aircraft attack an Allied convoy off Cape Bon, Tunisia, but defending British fighters prevent them from inflicting any serious damage.
- July 27 – To win a bet with British pilots in training at his instrument flight school in Bryan, Texas, who are skeptical of the airworthiness of the AT-6 Texan trainer aircraft at the school, U.S. Army Air Forces Lieutenant Colonel James Duckworth and his navigator, Lieutenant Ralph O'Hair, make the first deliberate flight into a hurricane in history, reaching the eye of the "Surprise Hurricane" in the Gulf of Mexico off Galveston, Texas, in an AT-6. In addition to demonstrating the sturdiness of the AT-6, the flight inspires others to attempt similar flights and becomes the genesis of the future "Hurricane Hunters" weather reconnaissance program.
- July 27–28 (overnight) – 787 British bombers attack Hamburg, with a loss of 17 aircraft. Atmospheric conditions create a self-propagating tornadic firestorm with winds of 150 miles per hour (240 km/h) and flames reaching 1,000 feet (300 m) in altitude, resulting in one of the most destructive air raids in history. Air temperatures reach 1,500 °F (820 °C), causing asphalt in city streets to catch fire. At least 40,000 people die in the raid and 1,200,000 flee the city, which does not regain its previous industrial capacity for the rest of the war. The raid shocks Germany.
- July 28
  - Luftwaffe single-engine fighters use BR 21 heavy-calibre under-wing rockets to attack concentrated American bomber formations for the first time. Employing the new weapon, Focke-Wulf Fw 190 pilots claim victories over U.S. Army Air Forces bombers attacking the Henschel aircraft factories at Kassel and the AGO Flugzeugwerke plant, license-building new and rebuilding veteran Fw 190s in Oschersleben, Germany.
  - A Douglas DC-3 airliner operating as American Airlines Flight 63 crashes in Allen County, Kentucky, killing 20 of the 22 people on board.
- July 29–30 (overnight) – Another raid on Hamburg by 777 British bombers targets undamaged areas in the northern part of the city, killing about 1,000 more people. The British lose 28 aircraft.
- July 30–31 (overnight) – 273 British bombers attack Remscheid, Germany, losing 15 of their number.
- July 31
  - German aircraft attack U.S. Navy warships bombarding coastal artillery batteries near San Stéfano di Camastra, Sicily, but score no hits.
  - The U.S. Army Forces' Eleventh Air Force has carried out even more combat sorties against Japanese forces on Kiska in the Aleutian Islands in July than it had in June.

=== August ===
- The United States Navy Grumman F6F Hellcat fighter enters combat.
- August 1
  - 48 German aircraft make a surprise attack on ships in the harbor at Palermo, Sicily, dropping 60 large bombs and sinking a cargo ship.
  - Flying a Yakovlev Yak-1, Soviet Air Forces fighter ace Lydia Litvak disappears during a dogfight with German Messerschmitt Bf 109s over the Soviet Union near Orel. Decades later, her body is found, and she is confirmed as having been shot down and killed. Along with Yekaterina Budanova one of only two female aces in history, she commonly is credited with 12 victories at the time of her death, although she sometimes is credited with 11 or 13.
  - Flying from Libya, U.S. Army Air Forces B-24 Liberators attack the Ploieşti oil refineries in Romania.
  - During an air show at Lambert Field in St. Louis, Missouri, with several thousand people looking on, the first public demonstration of the St. Louis-built Waco CG-4 troop-carrying glider, ends in tragedy when the glider – Waco CG-4A-RO 42-78839, built by Robertson Aircraft Corporation – loses its right wing immediately after being released over the airfield by the tow airplane. The glider, carrying two United States Army Air Forces crewmen, St. Louis mayor William D. Becker, Robertson Aircraft and Lambert Field co-founder Major William B. Robertson, and six other passengers – crashes, killing everyone on board. The accident is attributed to the failure of a defective wing strut fitting.
- August 2
  - A U.S. Army Air Forces C-87 Liberator Express operated by United Airlines carrying Japanese nationals of the consular corps slated to be exchanged with Japan for Allied prisoners of war crashes just after takeoff from Whenuapai Aerodrome at Auckland, New Zealand, killing 16 of the 30 people on board.
  - A U.S. Army Air Forces C-46 Commando carrying a crew of four and 18 passengers including CBS News correspondent Eric Sevareid crashes in the Patkai Range on the Burma-India border, killing its flight officer. Everyone else on board parachutes to safety, several suffering injuries in the process, and spend 22 days on the ground before being recovered.
- August 2–3 (overnight) – The final raid of the Battle of Hamburg, by 740 British bombers, fails when the bombers encounter thunderstorms over northern Germany and scatter their bombs widely over an area 100 miles (160 km) across. Thirty British aircraft do not return. Despite the enormous damage it has inflicted, Operation Gomorrah has failed to completely destroy Hamburg.
- August 4
  - German aircraft again attack the harbor at Palermo, damaging the American destroyer USS Shubrick.
  - The U.S. Army Air Forces' Eleventh Air Force flies 135 sorties against Kiska in the Aleutian Islands, dropping 304,000 pounds (138,000 kg) of bombs.
- August 5 – The Women's Auxiliary Ferrying Squadron (WAFS) and the 319th Women's Flying Training Detachment (WFTD), both organizations of civilian women ferry pilots employed by the U.S. Army Air Forces Air Transport Command, are merged to form the Women Airforce Service Pilots (WASP).
- August 6
  - The German submarine U-177 uses a manned, towed Focke-Achgelis Fa 330 autogyro kite to spot the Greek steamer Efthalia Mari, which U-177 then intercepts and sinks. It is the only occasion on which a submarine's use of an Fa 330 results in a sinking.
  - A third German air raid on Palermo is driven off by Allied night fighters with only a few bombs dropped on the harbor.
- August 7–8 (overnight) – 197 British Lancasters bombers attack Genoa, Milan, and Turin, with the loss of two aircraft. Over Turin, where 20 people are killed and 79 injured, Group Captain John H. Searby serves as the first successful "Master of Ceremonies" – later known as "Master Bomber" – an experienced officer who circles over a bombing target throughout an attack to direct bombing crews by radio and improve their accuracy.
- August 8 – Axis bombers attack the American light cruiser USS Philadelphia off Sant'Agata di Militello, Sicily, scoring no hits.
- August 8–17 – Allied aircraft of the Northwest African Air Force attack Axis forces evacuating Sicily across the Strait of Messina to mainland Italy in Operation Lehrgang. Wellington strategic bombers average 85 sorties nightly – attacking evacuation beaches in Sicily until the night of August 13–14, then ports in mainland Italy – and medium bombers and fighter-bombers fly 1,170 sorties. Allied planes face no Axis air opposition but face heavy antiaircraft fire and succeed in sinking only a few vessels, never endangering the success of the Axis evacuation.
- August 9–10 (overnight) – 457 British bombers attack Mannheim, Germany, and scatter their bombs due to cloud cover. Nine do not return.
- August 10 – Reinforced by 250 Imperial Japanese Army aircraft from Rabaul, Japanese air forces in New Guinea are ordered to conduct an air offensive against Allied airfields on New Guinea and Allied convoys along the Papuan coast.
- August 10 – Official backing for the trio of Heinkel He 177B "separately"-four-engined strategic bomber prototypes, numbered V101 through V103 comes from Luftwaffe Generalfeldmarschall Erhard Milch, ordering Arado Flugzeugwerke, already the sole subcontractor for the He 177A, to start work towards production of the new B-series airframes.
- August 10–11 (overnight) – 653 British bombers strike Nuremberg, Germany, damaging the central and southern parts of the city and starting a large fire. Sixteen bombers are lost.
- August 11
  - Eight German Focke-Wulf Fw 190s attack USS Philadelphia and two American destroyers off Brolo, Sicily; they score no hits. Philadelphia shoots down five of them and the destroyer USS Ludlow and a U.S. Army Air Forces fighter shoot down one each. Allied aircraft break up a German counterattack against U.S. Army forces at Brolo, but seven U.S. Army Air Forces A-36 bombers mistakenly attack the American positions, destroying the command post and four artillery pieces.
  - Nine U.S. Army Air Forces B-24 Liberators of the Eleventh Air Force make the second raid of World War II against the Kurile Islands, again attacking the Japanese base at Paramushiro, causing noteworthy damage. Japanese fighters shoot down one B-24 and damage the other eight; the B-24s shoot down 13 Japanese fighters. The Eleventh Air Force decides not to raid the Kuriles again without fighter escort of its bombers.
- August 12–13 (overnight) – 504 British bombers bomb Milan and 152 strike Turin, losing five of their number. Although horribly wounded by misdirected machine-gun fire from another bomber while approaching Turin, Flight Sergeant Arthur Louis Aaron, the pilot of a No. 218 Squadron Short Stirling, assists his surviving crew in getting the plane home before dying; he later receives a posthumous Victoria Cross.
- August 13 – The U.S. Army Air Forces make their first bombing raid on Austria.
- August 14 – Japanese aircraft raid the Allied air base at Marilinan, New Guinea.
- August 14–15 (overnight) – 140 British Lancasters bomb Milan. One does not return.
- August 15
  - U.S. forces land on Vella Lavella. The Japanese respond with air raids of 54, 59, and eight planes during the day, but do little damage, and U.S. Marine Corps F4U Corsair fighters strafe Kahili Airfield on Bougainville Island. The Japanese claim to have lost 17 planes, but U.S. forces claim 44 shot down.
  - In Operation Cottage, American and Canadian forces invade Kiska, only to find that all Japanese had evacuated the island secretly on July 28. Employing 359 combat aircraft – the most it ever had during World War II – the Eleventh Air Force has conducted a continuous bombing campaign and dropped surrender leaflets for three weeks before the invasion, mostly against an uninhabited island. Since June 1, the Eleventh Air Force has made 1,454 sorties against Kiska, dropping 1,255 tonnes (1,255,000 kg) of bombs.
  - The landings on Kiska end the 439-day-long Aleutian Islands campaign, during which the Eleventh Air Force has flown 3,609 combat sorties, dropped 3,500 tonnes (3,500,000 kg) of bombs, lost 40 aircraft in combat and 174 to other causes, and suffered 192 aircraft damaged. U.S. Navy patrol aircraft have flown 704 combat sorties, dropped 590,000 pounds (270,000 kg) of bombs, and lost 16 planes in combat and 35 due to other causes. Including transport aircraft, the Allies lost 471 aircraft during the campaign to all causes, while the Japanese lost 69 aircraft in combat and about 200 to other causes.
- August 15–16 (overnight) – Royal Air Force Bomber Command makes its last raid on Italy, with 199 Lancasters attacking Milan and 154 striking Turin. Eleven bombers are lost, most of them shot down by German fighters waiting for them as they make their return flight across France.
- August 17
  - 164 U.S. Army Air Forces aircraft of the Fifth Air Force attack Japanese airfields at Wewak, New Guinea, destroying 70 planes while the Japanese are servicing them for another raid on Marilinan.
  - 60 U.S. Army Air Forces bombers are lost in raids on Regensburg and Schweinfurt.
  - The last Axis forces evacuate Sicily, bringing the Sicily campaign to an end. The U.S. Army Air Forces have lost 28 killed, 41 wounded, and 88 missing during the campaign.
  - The Germans make the first operational use of any type of rocket-boosted PGM in aerial warfare, with their MCLOS radio-guidance Henschel Hs 293 anti-ship missile.
- August 17–18 – The German Luftwaffe makes two 80-plane raids by Junkers Ju 88s against Bizerte, Tunisia, where Allied ships are assembling for the invasion of mainland Italy. They sink an infantry landing craft, damage three other vessels, destroy oil installations, kill 22 men, and wound 215.
- August 17–18 (overnight) – 596 Royal Air Force bombers attack the German ballistic missile research station at Peenemünde for the first time in a raid especially designed to kill as many German scientists and other workers as possible before they can reach air raid shelters. They kill nearly 200 people in the accommodations area, but also mistakenly bomb a nearby prison camp for foreign slave workers, killing 500 to 600 there. For the first time, the British bombers fly a route intended to trick German night fighter forces into deploying to defend the wrong target. Also for the first time, the British employ the new Spotfire 250 lb (110 kg) target indicator. Forty British bombers (6.7 percent) fail to return. The raid sets the German ballistic missile program back at least two, and perhaps more than six, months.
- August 19 – Generaloberst Hans Jeschonnek, the Chief of the General Staff of the Luftwaffe, commits suicide.
- August 22–23 (overnight) – Bomber Command sends 462 aircraft to attack the IG Farben factory at Leverkusen, Germany. Due to thick cloud cover and a partial failure of the Oboe navigation system, heir bombs scatter widely, striking 12 other towns in addition to Leverkusen. Five bombers do not return.
- August 23 – About 20 German Junkers Ju 88 bombers attack the harbor at Palermo, Sicily, damaging several ships.
- August 23–24 (overnight) – Royal Air Force Bomber Command resumes the bombing of Berlin with a raid by 727 bombers. Poor target marking, poor timing by bombers, and the difficulty H2S navigation radar has in identifying landmarks in Berlin lead to wide scattering of bombs, although the Germans suffer nearly 900 casualties on the ground. For the first time, the Germans employ new Zahme Sau ("Tame Boar") tactics – the use of ground-based guidance to direct night fighters into the British bomber stream, after which the night fighters operate independently against targets they find – and the British lose 56 bombers, the highest number so far in a single night and 7.9 percent of the participating aircraft.
- August 25 – A Luftwaffe aircraft, a Dornier Do 217 of II.Gruppe/Kampfgeschwader 100 scores the first hit on a target in history using a guided missile, striking the Royal Navy sloop HMS Bideford in the Bay of Biscay with a rocket-boosted Henschel Hs 293 glide bomb. The warhead does not explode, and damage to Bideford is minimal. In the same sortie, another attempt at an Hs 293 strike slightly damages the Royal Navy patrol vessel HMS Landguard with a near miss.
- August 27 – Just two days after the strike attempt on HMS Bideford, guided missiles sink a ship for the first time, when a squadron of eighteen KG 100 Dornier Do 217s launching Henschel Hs 293 glide bombs sinks the Royal Navy sloop HMS Egret in the Bay of Biscay with the loss of 198 lives. In the same strike, the Royal Canadian Navy destroyer HMCS Athabaskan suffers heavy damage from Hs 293 hits, while the Royal Navy destroyer HMS Grenville evades damage by out-turning the Hs 293s as the German bombers launch them at her one at a time. The loss of Egret and damage to Athabaskan lead the Allies to halt antisubmarine patrols in the Bay of Biscay by surface ships.
- August 27–28 (overnight) – 674 British bombers attack Nuremberg, suffering the loss of 33 aircraft. Despite clear skies, it is very dark and many aircraft have trouble with their H2S radar sets and with hearing the directions of the Master Bomber, and results are unsatisfactory.
- August 30 – A Qantas Empire Airways PBY Catalina flying boat on the "Double Sunrise Route" from Ceylon to Perth, Australia, completes the longest non-stop scheduled airline flight in history. From mooring buoy to mooring buoy, the flight takes 31 hours 51 minutes.
- August 30–31 (overnight)
  - RAF Bomber Command dispatches 660 bombers to attack Mönchengladbach and Rheydt, Germany. Good visibility and successful marking by Pathfinder aircraft leads to a successful raid.
  - Bomber Command begins a series of small night raids against German ammunition dumps in forests in northern France.
- August 31 – Serving in the U.S. Army Air Forces during World War II, American professional football player Len Supulski dies along with seven other men in the crash of a B-17 Flying Fortress near Kearny, Nebraska, during a training flight.
- August 31 – September 1 (overnight) – RAF Bomber Command sends 622 bombers to attack Berlin. For the first time, the Luftwaffe employs illuminator aircraft – Junkers Ju 88s dropping flares – to provide light for attacking "Wild Boar" daylight fighters. Cloud cover, H2S problems, and stiff German resistance cause Pathfinder aircraft to drop their markers well south of the target area and lead the bombers to scatter their bombs as much as 30 miles (48 km) back along the approach route to Berlin, suggesting that Bomber Command crews are turning back early in the face of increasing losses. Forty-seven bombers do not return; although this is only 1.6 percent of the overall force, the loss rate among Handley Page Halifaxes is 11.4 percent and that among Short Stirlings is 16 percent. German fighters have shot down two-thirds of the lost bombers. Despite the raid's failure, it prompts Gauleiter of Berlin Joseph Goebbels to order all children and all adults not engaged in war work to be evacuated from Berlin to the countryside and to towns in eastern Germany where air raids are not expected.

=== September ===
- United States Coast Guard Lieutenant Commander Frank A. Erickson completes training as the Coast Guard's first helicopter pilot and is designated Coast Guard Helicopter Pilot No. 1. He also becomes the first Coast Guard helicopter instructor.
- September 1
  - Due to the vast distances involved, land-based American aircraft have flown only 102 combat sorties in the Central Pacific Area since January 1.
  - U.S. Navy aircraft from the carriers USS Essex, USS Yorktown, and USS Independence fly six strikes totaling 275 sorties against Marcus Island, destroying several Japanese Mitsubishi G4M (Allied reporting name "Betty") bombers on the ground in exchange for the loss of four American aircraft.
  - U.S. Army Air Forces Fifth Air Force aircraft conduct a major raid against the Japanese airfield at Madang, New Guinea.
  - The U.S. Army Air Forces disband the Army Air Forces Antisubmarine Command, although some Army antisubmarine squadrons will operate until November.
  - The Civil Air Patrol is relieved of maritime patrol duties off the coast of the United States.
  - The U.S. Navy PBY-5A Catalina 41-2459 is retired from patrol service over the Atlantic Ocean after serving in Patrol Squadrons 73 (VP-73) and 84 (VP-84) and is relegated to transport service for the remainder of World War II. Sinking three German submarines and damaging another badly enough for British forces to sink it later, 41-2459 finishes the war as the most successful submarine-killing Catalina of World War II.
- September 1–11 – The aircraft carriers USS Princeton and USS Belleau Wood and Canton Island-based U.S. Navy PV-1 Venturas cover the unopposed American landing on Baker Island. On three occasions, F6F Hellcats from the carriers shoot down an approaching Japanese Kawanishi H8K (Allied reporting name "Emily") flying boat. A U.S. Army Air Forces fighter squadron arrives on Baker Island on September 11.
- September 2 – U.S. Army Fifth Air Force aircraft attack the airfield and harbor at Wewak, New Guinea, sinking two Japanese merchant ships.
- September 3–4 (overnight) – 316 British Lancasters attack Berlin while four de Havilland Mosquitos drop "spoof" flares to draw German night fighters away from them, but 22 Lancasters (almost 7 percent) nonetheless are lost. The raid hits residential areas and several factories and knocks out major water and electricity plants and one of the city's largest breweries.
- September 4
  - Finding the red in the national insignia adopted in June 1943 for its military aircraft could cause confusion with Japanese markings during combat, the United States adopts a new marking consisting of a white star centered in a blue circle flanked by white rectangles, with the entire insignia outlined in blue. The new marking will remain in use until January 1947.
  - Allied forces land at Lae, New Guinea. A small raid by nine Japanese planes destroys a tank landing ship off Lae. Later, the Japanese mount a strike of 80 aircraft; after U.S. Army Air Forces P-38 Lightnings shoot down 23, the rest attack Allied ships off Lae, damaging two tank landing ships.
- September 5 – In the first Allied parachute assault of the Pacific War, 1,700 men of the United States Army's 503rd Parachute Infantry Regiment parachute onto the Japanese airfield at Nadzab, New Guinea, capturing it easily. An airlift of several thousand more Allied troops to the airfield occurs over the next few days.
- September 5–6 (overnight) – 605 British bombers make a very successful attack on Mannheim and Ludwigshafen, Germany, but lose 34 (5.6 percent) of their number.
- September 6–7 (overnight)
  - 180 Axis aircraft attack an Allied convoy anchored in the harbor at Bizerte, Tunisia, but a smoke screen prevents them from scoring any hits.
  - 404 British bombers attack Munich, but scatter their bombs due to cloud cover. Sixteen bombers (4 percent) do not return.
- September 8
  - German aircraft attack Allied convoys south of Sicily, sinking a tank landing craft and damaging other ships.
  - 131 U.S. Army Air Forces B-17 Flying Fortresses conduct a bombing raid against the headquarters of Field Marshal Albert Kesselring at Frascati, Italy, killing 485 civilians.
  - Italy's surrender to the Allies is proclaimed.
- September 8–9 (overnight) – American aircraft participate in a Bomber Command night raid for the first time, when five U.S. Army Air Forces B-17 Flying Fortresses join 257 British bombers in an attack on a German long-range gun position at Boulogne, France. The gun position is not damaged. All bombers return safely.
- September 9
  - In Operations Avalanche and Slapstick, Allied forces land at Salerno and Taranto, Italy, respectively. The British aircraft carriers HMS Illustrious, HMS Formidable, and HMS Unicorn and escort carriers HMS Attacker, HMS Battler, HMS Hunter, and HMS Stalker cover the landings. In an innovation at Salerno, U.S. Army Air Forces P-51 Mustangs of the 111th Fighter Squadron join the more vulnerable U.S. Navy floatplanes of American light cruisers in spotting fire for naval gunfire against German forces ashore. The German Luftwaffe puts up only minor opposition to the landings, with only four air raid alerts occurring during the day.
  - Within weeks of the rocket-boosted Henschel Hs 293's pioneering deployment, Luftwaffe Dornier Do 217 bombers of Kampfgeschwader 100 sink the Italian battleship Roma west of Corsica with two Fritz X radio-controlled glide bombs—the first documented successful use of a "free-fall", unpowered PGM ordnance device in military aviation history—as she steams to surrender to the Allies; 1,253 of the 1,849 aboard are lost.
- September 10–12 – Allied forces detect only 158 German Luftwaffe sorties against the Salerno beachhead. Allied fighters break up most of the German attacks before they reach the beachhead.
- September 11
  - French fighter ace Pierre Le Gloan (18 victories) dies in a crash.
  - A Luftwaffe Dornier Do 217 bomber badly damages the U.S. Navy light cruiser USS Savannah with a Fritz X off Salerno, Italy, knocking her out of service for a year.
  - The U.S. Army Air Forces' Eleventh Air Force launches its third raid against Japanese bases in the Kurile Islands, with seven B-24 Liberators and 12 B-25 Mitchells dropping 12 tonnes (12,000 kg) of bombs on Paramushiro and Shumushu. During a 50-minute dogfight with 60 Japanese fighters, three of the bombers are shot down and seven so badly damaged that they crashland in the neutral Soviet Union, where they are interned. Suffering its worst losses in any single mission, the Eleventh Air Force loses half its long-range striking power during the raid, and attempts no further bombing raids against the Kuriles during 1943.
- September 12
  - In a daring air assault, 26 Waffen SS troops and 82 Fallschirmjäger (paratroopers) under the command of Hauptsturmführer Otto Skorzeny arriving at Campo Imperatore in Italy's Gran Sasso massif, high in the Apennine Mountains, in ten DFS 230 gliders towed by Henschel Hs 126 aircraft. They free Benito Mussolini from imprisonment in the Campo Imperatore Hotel without firing a shot, and Mussolini is flown from the scene in a Luftwaffe Fieseler Fi 156C-3/Trop Storch STOL aircraft, bearing Stammkennzeichen code of "SJ+LL" to the military airport of Pratica di Mare, near Rome. Mussolini then embarks in a Heinkel He 111 and flies on to Vienna.
  - The British escort carriers Attacker, Battler, Hunter, and Stalker fly off 26 Supermarine Seafires to operate from Paestum airfield in the Salerno beachhead, then withdraw to Palermo, Sicily, to refuel.
- September 13 – Off Salerno, the American light cruiser USS Philadelphia avoids two German Fritz X guided glide bombs, but Fritz X badly damages the British light cruiser HMS Uganda, and Henschel Hs 293 glide bomb fatally damages the British hospital ship HMHS Newfoundland, which was scuttled the following day. During the evening, 82 C-47 Skytrains and C-53 Skytroopers flying from Sicily drop 600 paratroopers of the United States Army's 82nd Airborne Division behind Allied lines in the Salerno beachhead.
- September 14 – The Allied Northwest African Air Force conducts large strikes against German ground forces around the Salerno beachhead. Off Salerno, an American Liberty ship becomes a total loss after a German guided bomb hits her.
- September 14–15 (overnight) – U.S. Army Air Forces transport aircraft drop 1,900 more U.S. Army paratroopers of the 82nd Airborne Division into the Salerno beachhead.
- September 15 – A German guided bomb strikes another American Liberty ship off Salerno, and she becomes a total loss.
- September 15–16 (overnight)
  - 369 British bombers and five U.S. Army Air Forces B-17 Flying Fortresses make a very successful attack on the Dunlop Rubber factory at Montluçon, France, hitting every building and starting a large fire. Three British bombers are lost.
  - Eight Lancasters of No. 617 Squadron drop the Royal Air Force's new HC-class, triple-length 12,000-pound (5,400 kg) "high capacity" bomb – not to be confused with the "Tallboy" 12,000 lb (5,400 kg) bomb first used in 1944 – for the first time in a low-level raid on the banks of the Dortmund-Ems Canal near Ladbergen, Germany. Five Lancasters are lost, and the Royal Air Force discontinues low-level raids by heavy bombers for the remainder of World War II.
- September 16 – The British battleship HMS Warspite is badly damaged by two hits and two near misses by German guided bombs off Salerno. She is out of service until mid-1944.
- September 16–17 – 340 British bombers and five U.S. Army Air Forces B-17 Flying Fortresses attack the railway yards at Modane, France, in an attempt to cut rail communications between France and Italy. The raid is unsuccessful due to inaccurate bombing, and three British bombers are lost.
- September 18–19 – U.S. Navy aircraft from the carriers USS Lexington, USS Princeton, and USS Belleau Wood make seven strikes against Tarawa Atoll, destroying nine Japanese aircraft on the ground, sinking a merchant ship in the lagoon, and leaving facilities on the atoll ablaze and many Japanese dead. They also photograph potential landing beaches on the island of Betio. Four American aircraft are lost.
- September 20–21 (overnight) – To disrupt the German evacuation of Corsica, Allied Northwest African Air Force Wellington, Mitchell, and Liberator bombers begin strikes against airfields, shipping, and port facilities at Bastia, Corsica, and Leghorn and Pisa, Italy.
- September 21 – John William Ditter, a member of the United States House of Representatives representing Pennsylvania's 17th Congressional District, dies along with another man in the fiery crash of a U.S. Navy plane in heavy rain near Columbia, Pennsylvania.
- September 21–22 (overnight) – A Northwest African Air Force raid on Bastia damages the port enough to slow the German evacuation of Corsica.
- September 22 – Allied forces land at Finschhafen, New Guinea. A raid by 41 Rabaul-based Japanese aircraft inflicts no damage on the Allied ships involved, demonstrating that Allied fears that their ships could not operate survivably in the Solomon Sea and Bismarck Sea are no longer warranted.
- September 22–24 – Ernst Jachmann flies his single-seat glider for 55 hours 51 minutes in a thermal.
- September 22–23 (overnight) – 711 British bombers and 5 U.S. Army Air Forces B-17 Flying Fortresses make the first raid on Hanover, Germany, in two years, bombing mostly its south and southeastern portions in the first of a series of four heavy raids on the city. It is the first night raid on Germany by American bombers. Twenty-six British aircraft (3.7 percent of the force) are lost.
- September 23–24 (overnight) – 628 British bombers and 5 U.S. Army Air Forces B-17 Flying Fortresses strike Mannheim, Germany, in a successful raid that also damages part of neighboring Ludwigshafen. Thirty-two British aircraft (5.1 percent of the force) are lost. A diversionary raid by 29 other British bombers on nearby Darmstadt causes significant damage there.
- September 25–26 – Allied aircraft attack airfields on Corsica and ferry traffic between Corsica and Italy, and shoot down four German transport aircraft.
- September 27 – The U.S. Navy formally terminates its amphibious glider program, having concluded that gliders are impractical for the landing of United States Marine Corps forces on beachheads.
- September 27–28 (overnight) – 678 British bombers and 5 U.S. Army Air Forces B-17 Flying Fortresses strike Hanover, Germany, mostly hitting open countryside and villages north of the city. Thirty-eight British aircraft (5.6 percent of the force) and one B-17 are lost. A diversionary raid by 27 other British bombers on Braunschweig kills 218 people and loses one Lancaster. German night fighter ace Hauptmann Hans-Dieter Frank dies in a collision with another night fighter over Hanover late on the 27th; his score stands at 55 kills at his death.
- September 29–30 (overnight) – 352 British bombers attack Bochum, Germany, in an accurate and successful raid. Nine British aircraft (2.6 percent of the force) are lost.

=== October ===
- The U.S. Navy takes delivery of its first helicopter, a Sikorsky HNS-1.
- During the month, American land-based aircraft fly 3,187 combat sorties in the South Pacific Area, but only 71 sorties in the Central Pacific Area. Air Solomons (AirSols) aircraft make 158 flights totalling 3,259 sorties against Japanese land targets and ships at Kahili, Kara, Ballale Island, Buka Island, Bonis, and Choiseul Island, badly damaging five Japanese airfields and claiming 139 Japanese aircraft destroyed in exchange for the loss of 26 Allied aircraft.
- October 1–2 (overnight) – 253 British bombers make a very successful attack on Hagen, Germany, with the loss of two aircraft.
- October 2–3 (overnight) – 294 British Lancasters and two U.S. Army Air Forces B-17 Flying Fortresses bomb Munich, Germany, with limited successful due to scattering of Pathfinder markers. Eight Lancasters are lost (2.8 percent of the force).
- October 3–4 (overnight) – 547 British bombers attack Kassel, Germany, losing 24 of their number (4.4 percent). Poor target marking leads to most of the bombs hitting the western suburbs and outlying towns and villages.
- October 4 – During Operation Leader, aircraft from the American aircraft carrier USS Ranger raid German shipping along the coast of Norway, sinking six steamers and damaging four others, including a transport on which about 200 German troops are killed.
- October 4–5 (overnight) – 406 British bombers and three U.S. Army Air Forces B-17 Flying Fortresses attack Frankfurt-am-Main, Germany, and inflict the first serious damage on the city, hitting its eastern half and the docks on the River Main. Ten British aircraft (2.5 percent of the force) are lost as well as one B-17. It is the last time that American aircraft participate in a Royal Air Force night-bombing raid.
- October 5–6 – The Fast Carrier Task Force, U.S. Pacific Fleet, strikes Wake Island with the largest force of American fast carriers – three fleet carriers and three light carriers – ever organized at the time. Their aircraft make six strikes totalling 738 sorties, destroying 22 of the 34 Japanese aircraft on the island in exchange for the loss of 12 American aircraft lost in combat and 14 to other causes. For the first time, a U.S. Navy submarine is assigned to support the raid by performing "lifeguard" duties for aviators forced down at sea during the strike; USS Skate rescues four fliers. Submarines "lifeguarding" will become a standard feature of American carrier raids beyond the range of Allied search-and-rescue aircraft.
- October 7 – While serving as a German SS officer, Prince Christoph of Hesse dies in an aviation accident in the Apennine Mountains near Forlì, Italy. His body is found two days later.
- October 7–8 (overnight) – 343 British Lancasters attack Stuttgart, Germany, including the first aircraft equipped with ABC equipment for jamming German night fighter communications. Few German night fighters interfere because they are misdirected to a diversionary raid on Munich, and only four Lancasters (1.2 percent) are lost. An additional 16 Lancasters attack Friederichshafen and claim hits on the Zeppelin factory there.
- October 8–9 (overnight) – In the last RAF Bomber Command raid in which Vickers Wellingtons participate, 504 British bombers strike Hanover and successfully bomb the city center in probably the most damaging attack on the city during the war. German night fighters are well placed for interception, and 27 British aircraft (5.4 percent) are lost. In the largest diversionary raid thus far in the war, 119 other British bombers attack Bremen, scattering their bombs widely and losing three aircraft (2.5 percent of the force).
- October 10 – In a USAAF bombing raid on Münster targeting war workers' housing, the only surviving B-17 of the 100th Bomb Group's 13 Flying Fortresses to sortie from their base at RAF Thorpe Abbotts into occupied European airspace that day, s/n 42-6087 Royal Flush, piloted by then-Lieutenant Robert Rosenthal makes it home to Thorpe Abbotts with two shot-out engines and the two waist-gunners seriously wounded.
- October 11 – Leading a flight of four Fifth Air Force P-47 Thunderbolts conducting a reconnaissance flight over Japanese facilities near Wewak, New Guinea, United States Army Air Forces Lieutenant Colonel Neel E. Kearby, the commanding officer of the 348th Fighter Group, shoots down a Japanese fighter below him, then leads his four P-47s in an attack on 12 Japanese bombers escorted by 36 fighters. He quickly downs three more Japanese aircraft, then comes to the aid of a P-47 being chased by two Japanese fighters by shooting both of the Japanese planes. All four P-47s return safely. For shooting down six enemy aircraft on a single mission, Kearby will receive the Medal of Honor.
- October 12 – The U.S. Army Air Forces' Fifth Air Force conducts the largest Allied airstrike thus far in World War II in the Pacific, sending 349 aircraft to attack the Japanese airfields, shipping, and supply depots at Rabaul, New Britain, losing five aircraft. Allied airstrikes on Rabaul will continue for much of the rest of the war.
- October 13
  - The Italian royal government declares war on Germany. Its air force will be constituted as the Italian Co-Belligerent Air Force and fight on the Allied side for the remainder of World War II, while Italian aircraft which fight for Benito Mussolini's Italian Social Republic on the Axis side will be constituted as the Aeronautica Nazionale Repubblicana (National Republican Air Force).
  - The German ace Emil Lang shoots down ten Soviet aircraft in one day over the Soviet Union near Kiev.
  - Nine Japanese four-engine bombers attack Attu. It is the last Japanese air raid against the Aleutian Islands.
- October 14 – The Eighth Air Force's Mission 115 on Schweinfurt takes place, leading to the disastrous loss of some 77 out of 291 heavy bombers sent on the raid (60 shot down/17 written-off) and some 650 pilots and aircrew dead or missing to elements of six defending German Jagdgeschwader day-fighter wings.
- October 15 – A Douglas DC-3 airliner operating as American Airlines Flight 63 crashes near Centerville, Tennessee, killing all 11 people on board.
- October 18 – From Dobodura, New Guinea, the Fifth Air Force mounts another raid on Rabaul of about the same size as the October 12 raid, but bad weather hampers the aircraft and only 54 B-25 Mitchell bombers get through.
- October 18–19 (overnight)
  - In the conclusion of the four-raid series against Hanover, 360 Lancasters attack the city with the loss of 18 of their number (5 percent of the force). Due to cloud cover and poor target marking, they scatter their bombs widely, mostly over open country to the north and west of Hanover. One of the British bombers is the 5,000th lost by Bomber Command during World War II. In the four Hanover raids, the British have flown 2,253 sorties and the U.S. Army Air Forces have contributed 10 B-17 Flying Fortress sorties, and 110 bombers (4.9 percent) have been lost.
  - Through raids of this night, Bomber Command aircraft have flown about 144,500 sorties since the beginning of World War II, 90 percent of them at night. It has lost 5,004 aircraft, 4,365 at night and 639 in daylight.
- October 20 – A U.S. Navy PBY Catalina flying boat and an Imperial Japanese Navy Mitsubishi G4M (Allied reporting name "Betty") bomber exchange fire off Attu. It is the last air combat action in the Aleutian Islands.
- October 20–21 (overnight) – 358 British Lancasters make the first major attack on Leipzig with the loss of 16 aircraft (4.5 percent). Due to what Bomber Command calls "appalling" weather, the aircraft scatter their bombs widely.
- October 21 – The German ace Emil Lang shoots down 12 Soviet aircraft in one day over the Soviet Union near Kiev, raising his victory total to 72.
- October 22–23 (overnight)
  - 569 British bombers strike Kassell, Germany, in the most destructive raid since the July 1943 Hamburg raid and not equalled until well into 1944, with a firestorm breaking out in the city center. German night fighters are well positioned for interception, and the British lose 43 bombers (7.6 percent of the force). A diversionary raid on Frankfurt-am-Main by another 36 bombers scatters its bombs and loses an additional Lancaster.
  - A Royal Air Force ground radio station in England begins broadcasts to break into German ground controller communications with night fighters and give false and confusing directions to the German aircraft.
- October 23 – 45 Fifth Air Force B-24 Liberators raid Rabaul, escorted by 47 P-38 Lightnings.
- October 24 – 62 Fifth Air Force B-25 Mitchells raid Rabaul, escorted by 54 P-38 Lightnings.
- October 25 – 61 Fifth Air Force B-24 Liberators raid Rabaul, escorted by 50 P-38 Lightnings. The Fifth Air Force's commander, Major General George Kenney, claims 175 Japanese aircraft destroyed in the raids of October 23–25; the Japanese admit a loss of nine of their planes shot down and 25 destroyed on the ground.
- October 27 – During U.S. landings in the Treasury Islands, 25 Japanese Aichi D3A ("Val") dive bombers attack U.S. ships offshore, damaging a destroyer in exchange for the loss of 12 aircraft.
- October 29 – Between 37 and 41 Fifth Air Force B-24 Liberators, escorted by between 53 and 75 P-38 Lightnings, drop 115 tonnes (115,000 kg) of bombs on Vunakanau airfield at Rabaul, claiming 45 Japanese aircraft shot down or destroyed on the ground; the Japanese admit a loss of seven of their planes shot down and three destroyed on the ground.

=== November ===
- During the month, the Japanese government sets up a Ministry of Munitions to expedite the production of aircraft and to unify and simplify the production of military goods and raw materials.
- During the month, U.S. Navy carrier aircraft fly 2,284 combat sorties against the Gilbert and Marshall islands, dropping 917 tonnes (917,000 kg) of bombs. Land-based U.S. Army Air Forces B-24 and U.S. Navy PB4Y-1 Liberators fly 259 sorties against the islands and drop 275 tonnes (275,000 kg).
- During the month, American aircraft carriers lose 47 aircraft in combat and 73 due to other causes out of 831 carried, a loss rate of 14 percent.
- During the month, the United States and United Kingdom conduct joint evaluations aboard the steamer Daghestan off Bridgeport, Connecticut, to determine the limiting conditions for carrying out helicopter flights from a ship underway at sea.
- November 1
  - U.S. Marines land at Cape Torokina on Bougainville Island. Two Japanese air raids on the ships offshore – the first by 53 and the second by approximately 100 Japanese planes – are ineffective.
  - 173 Japanese carrier aircraft land at shore bases at Rabaul to reinforce about 200 Imperial Japanese Navy 11th Air Fleet aircraft already there.
  - The U.S. Army Air Forces activate the Fifteenth Air Force in the Mediterranean as a strategic air force.
- November 1–2 – Carrier aircraft from USS Saratoga and USS Princeton raid two Japanese airfields adjacent to the Buka Passage between Buka Island and Bougainville.
- November 1–2 (overnight) – 627 British bombers attack Düsseldorf, Germany, with the loss of 20 aircraft. Some of the bombers employ the Gee-H blind bombing system hardware in combat for the first time. The raid inflicts much damage on residential and industrial property. Flight Lieutenant William Reid of No. 61 Squadron, badly wounded by two German night fighter attacks, flies his heavily damaged bomber to the target and back and later receives the Victoria Cross for his actions. A diversionary raid on Cologne by another 62 bombers suffers no losses.
- November 2 – 75 Fifth Air Force B-25 Mitchells escorted by 80 P-38 Lightnings raid Rabaul, where they encounter the newly arrived Japanese carrier aircraft and lose nine B-25s and 10 P-38s shot down. They shoot down 20 Japanese planes and sink two merchant ships and a minesweeper.
- November 3 – Flying Focke-Wulf Fw 190A fighters, the German ace Emil Lang shoots down 18 Soviet aircraft over the Soviet Union during four sorties near Kiev. It remains the record for the most aerial victories by a pilot in one day.
- November 5 – 97 carrier aircraft from USS Saratoga and USS Princeton carry out a destructive strike on a Japanese task force at Simpson Harbor, Rabaul, damaging the heavy cruisers Atago, Maya, Mogami, and Takao, the light cruisers Agano and Noshiro, and a destroyer for the loss of 10 aircraft. The U.S. Army Air Forces' Fifth Air Force follows up with a strike by 27 B-24 Liberators escorted by 67 P-38 Lighntings on Rabaul town and its wharves. A counterstrike by 18 Japanese Nakajima B5N (Allied reporting name "Kate") torpedo bombers against the U.S. aircraft carriers mistakenly attacks a group of PT boats and a tank landing craft. The Japanese never risk heavy ships in the Solomon Islands again.
- November 6–7 (overnight) – The last Japanese air raid on Munda Airfield takes place.
- November 8 – A morning strike by 97 Japanese dive bombers and fighters and a few torpedo bombers damages a U.S. attack transport off Bougainville. An evening strike by 30 or 40 aircraft damages the light cruiser USS Birmingham.
- November 10–11 (overnight) – 313 Bomber Command Lancasters attack the railway yards at Modane, France, and the main rail line between France and Italy, inflicting serious damage on the railway system.
- November 11
  - A strike by carrier aircraft from USS Saratoga and USS Princeton against Japanese ships at Rabaul is ineffective due to bad weather. Another strike by approximately 185 aircraft from USS Essex, USS Bunker Hill, and USS Independence sinks a Japanese destroyer and damages the light cruiser Agano and a destroyer; the raid is the combat debut of the SB2C Helldiver dive bomber. A counterstrike by 108 Japanese Zero fighters, Aichi D3A "Val" dive bombers, and Nakajima B5N "Kate" torpedo bombers and a number of Mitsubishi G4M ("Betty") bombers is ineffective. The U.S. loses 11 aircraft, while the Japanese lose 39 single-engine planes and several G4Ms. During operations from shore bases at Rabaul, Japanese carrier aircraft have lost 50 percent of their fighters, 85 percent of their dive bombers, and 90 percent of their torpedo bombers in less than two weeks.
  - The last unit of the former U.S. Army Air Forces Antisubmarine Command, the 480th Antisubmarine Group, is disbanded, and all American antisubmarine activities become the responsibility of the U.S. Navy. The U.S. Army Air Forces' antisubmarine effort has sunk 12 German submarines.
- November 11–12 (overnight)
  - 134 British bombers raid the railroad marshalling yards at Cannes, France, and the main railway line between France and Italy, losing four aircraft. The raid fails to hit the railroad yards and succeeds only in inflicting blast damage on railway workshops.
  - After Bomber Command's No. 617 Squadron completes its training to operate from high altitudes following the abandonment of low-level missions by heavy bombers, 10 of the squadron's Lancasters attack French railroads with 12,000-pound (5,400 kg) bombs, scoring one hit on a railroad viaduct at Anthéor.
- November 12 – A strike by five Japanese Mitsubishi G4M ("Betty") bombers damages the light cruiser USS Denver off Bougainville.
- November 13 – American preparatory bombing for the amphibious landings in the Gilbert Islands begins with a strike by 17 U.S. Army Air Forces B-24 Liberators against Japanese forces on Betio island at Tarawa Atoll. For the next week, B-24s raid Betio, Butaritari, or both every day, Mili four times, and Jaluit and Maloelap twice each, destroying several Japanese aircraft. Japanese aircraft strike Nanumea and Funafuti once each, destroying one B-24 and damaging two.
- November 17 – Air Solomons (AirSols) fighters intercept 35 Japanese planes heading for a strike on the U.S. landings on Bougainville, shooting down 16 for the loss of two Vought F4U Corsairs. A Japanese torpedo bomber sinks a U.S. destroyer-transport off Bougainville with heavy loss of life.
- November 17–18 – 83 British bombers make a completely blind bombing raid on Ludwigshafen. Germany, guided only H2S radar. British radio broadcasts succeed in misdirecting most German night fighters to land too early to intercept them, and only one Lancaster is lost.
- November 18–19 – Carrier aircraft from USS Essex, USS Intrepid, and USS Cabot strike the island of Betio at Tarawa Atoll, inflicting considerable damage on Japanese forces there.
- November 18–19 (overnight) – Bomber Command's "Battle of Berlin" begins with a raid by 444 bombers on Berlin, of which nine (2 percent) are lost; few German night fighters intercept them, but Berlin is covered by cloud and they bomb blindly with unknown results. German night fighters successfully intercept a major diversionary raid by another 395 British bombers on Mannheim and shoot down 23 bombers (5.9 percent of the force). Mannheim also is cloud-covered and the raid scatters its bombs largely outside the city, but nonetheless kills 21 people, injures 154, and renders 7,500 homeless. It is the last raid on Mannheim for 15 months.
- November 19–20 (overnight) – 266 British bombers attack Leverkusen, Germany, in bad weather, which prevents most German night fighters from intercepting them but also makes them scatter their bombs so widely that only one bomb lands in Leverkusen, with other bombs hitting at least 27 other towns well to the north. Five bombers (1.9 percent of the force) are lost.
- November 20 – Operation Galvanic, the American invasion of the Gilbert Islands, begins with amphibious landings on Betio island at Tarawa Atoll and on Butaritari. The invasion is supported by 11 fleet and light aircraft carriers, eight escort aircraft carriers, and land-based aircraft of the U.S. Navy and the U.S. Army Air Force's Seventh Air Force. To oppose them, the Japanese have only 46 aircraft in the Gilbert and Marshall Islands combined. During the evening, Japanese torpedo bombers hit the aircraft carrier USS Independence with on torpedo, forcing her to withdraw for repairs but losing eight of their number; it is the only damage Japanese aircraft inflict on any American ship during the Gilbert Islands campaign.
- November 22–23 – Bomber Command mounts its largest raid on Berlin to date, dispatching 746 bombers. Despite having to bomb in weather bad enough to ground most German night fighters, the bombers conduct one of the most successful raids of the war, creating several firestorms with smoke reaching an altitude of 19,000 feet (5,800 m), rendering 175,000 people homeless, and damaging many sights and attractions in central Berlin as well as several factories and government buildings. Twenty-six British bombers (3.4 percent of the force) are lost. It is the last time that Short Stirlings participate in a raid against a target in Germany.
- November 23–24 (overnight) – 383 British bombers attack Berlin with the loss of 20 of their number (5.2 percent of the force). Although cloud cover interferes with target marking, bomber crews are able to bomb using 11 major fires still burning from the previous night as aiming points and inflict further heavy damage on the city.
- November 24
  - The Japanese submarine I-175 torpedoes and sinks the U.S. Navy escort aircraft carrier USS Liscome Bay 20 nautical miles (37 km) southwest of Butaritari with the loss of 644 lives, including that of Rear Admiral Henry M. Mullinnix; there are 272 survivors.
  - The first Allied aircraft – a damaged U.S. Marine Corps SBD Dauntless dive bomber – lands on Bougainville.
- November 25–26 (overnight)
  - Japanese aircraft attack American ships east of the Gilbert Islands, scoring no hits.
  - 262 British bombers raid Frankfurt-am-Main, Germany, losing 12 aircraft (4.6 percent of the force).
- November 26
  - Per orders from Reichsmarschall Hermann Göring, the Luftwaffe puts on a display of Germany's most advanced aircraft and aerial weapons at Insterburg, East Prussia, for Adolf Hitler. During his 90-minute visit, Hitler appears bored with the Dornier Do 335 Zerstörer fighter, the six-engined Junkers Ju 390 long-range bomber/transport/maritime patrol plane, the Fi 103R Reichenberg manned flying bomb, the Henschel Hs 293 rocket-boosted anti-ship missile, the Fritz X anti-warship gravity PGM, a Junkers Ju 88 equipped with special equipment for laying smoke screens, and panoramic radars and the Korfu receiving set for tracking enemy bombers, and he does not view the Messerschmitt Me 163 rocket fighter at all. He pauses at the Junkers Ju 290 bomber/transport/maritime patrol plane and orders that one be made available as his personal aircraft. He shows great interest in the Arado Ar 234 jet bomber, ordering that 200 be built by the end of 1944, and is most excited by the Messerschmitt Me 262 jet fighter, two of which make demonstration flights. Informed by Willy Messerschmitt that it could be adapted to carry one or two 250-kg (551-pound) bombs, Hitler orders that the Me 262 be produced as a bomber rather than a fighter, delaying its entry into service.
  - A Henschel Hs 293 glide bomb launched by a Luftwaffe Heinkel He 177 sinks the British troopship HMT Rohna in the Mediterranean Sea with the loss of 1,138 lives. Among the dead are 1,015 U.S. military personnel, and 35 American survivors later die of their wounds; it is the largest loss of life experienced by the U.S. armed forces in a single incident at sea.
- November 26–27 (overnight)
  - Japanese aircraft again strike American ships off the Gilbert Islands, scoring no hits. They encounter the first aircraft-carrier-based night combat air patrol in history, consisting of a TBF Avenger torpedo bomber and two F6F Hellcat fighters. The Avenger shoots down one Japanese plane, but Lieutenant Commander Edward H. "Butch" O'Hare, the U.S. Navy's second ace in history and first of World War II, is shot down and killed flying one of the Hellcats; he has seven victories at the time of his death.
  - Bomber Command dispatches 450 bombers to attack Berlin; they scatter their bombs, but add to the damage to the city center and suburbs. German night fighters intercept them, and 28 Lancasters (6.2 percent of the force) are lost and 14 more crash upon reaching England. A diversionary raid on Stuttgart by 173 more bombers scatters its bombs and loses six additional bombers (3.4 percent of the force).
- November 28 – Japanese resistance on Tarawa Atoll ends. American aircraft carriers depart the Gilbert Islands area before the end of the month.

=== December ===
- The Venezuelan airline Avensa makes its first flights.
- Early in the month, the U.S. Navy ceases testing of amphibious gliders. It had formally terminated the amphibious glider program in September.
- The United States Army Air Forces request that the Douglas Aircraft Company submit a proposal for a Mach 1-capable research aircraft.
- December 1 – The United States reopens the former Japanese airfield on Betio at Tarawa Atoll as Hawkins Field for use by fighters. In mid-December, it will begin to handle heavy bombers as well.
- December 2 – A night raid by 105 German Junkers Ju 88 bombers surprise the brilliantly lit Italian port of Bari while it is crowded with about 30 Allied ships, meeting little opposition. A sheet of flame from a burning tanker spreads over the harbor; 16 ships carrying 38,000 tonnes (38,000,000 kg) of cargo are destroyed, eight are damaged, and a quantity of mustard gas is released from the cargo of one stricken ship; at least 125 American personnel alone are killed; and the port does not return to full operations for three weeks. It is the most destructive single air raid against shipping since the Japanese attack on Pearl Harbor in December 1941.
- December 2–3 (overnight) – 458 British bombers attack Berlin, scattering their bombs widely across the southern part of the city and the countryside beyond due to adverse winds but nonetheless causing some damage to factories and destroying 136 buildings. German night fighters intercept the raid and the British lose 40 bombers (8.7 percent of the force).
- December 3–4 (overnight)
  - Japanese Rabaul-based aircraft attack U.S. ships approaching Bougainville Island.
  - 527 British bombers raid Leipzig, Germany, with the American broadcast journalist Edward R. Murrow riding as an observer in a Lancaster of No. 619 Squadron. The most successful attack on Leipzig of the war, it inflicts heavy damage on housing and industrial buildings. During the return flight to England, the bombers mistakenly fly over the defenses of Frankfurt-am-Main, where many are shot down. Twenty-four bombers do not return, a 4.6 percent loss rate.
- December 4
  - U.S. Navy carrier aircraft strike Kwajalein Atoll. Those from USS Essex and USS Lexington concentrate on Roi, where they shoot down 28 Japanese aircraft and destroy 19 on the ground, sink a large cargo ship, and damage the light cruiser Isuzu; those from USS Enterprise and USS Yorktown strike Kwajalein Island, where they destroy 18 floatplanes, sink three merchant ships, and damage the light cruiser Nagara. A combined total of five American aircraft are lost. Twenty-nine Yorktown aircraft raid Wotje later in the day. Japanese aircraft attack the retiring carrier force during the afternoon and overnight, damaging Lexington with a torpedo in exchange for the loss of 29 Japanese planes.
  - The U.S. Navy submarine USS Sailfish torpedoes and sinks the Japanese aircraft carrier Chūyō near Hachijōjima with the loss of over 1,243 lives, including 20 American prisoners of war.
- December 5 – The only major Japanese air operation involving aircraft of both the Imperial Japanese Army and Imperial Japanese Navy takes place, as an Army force of 27 Mitsubishi Ki-21 Allied reporting name "Sally") bombers escorted by 101 Army Nakajima Ki-43 Hayabusa (peregrine falcon"; Allied reporting name "Oscar") fighters followed by nine Navy Mitsubishi G4M1 (Allied reporting name "Betty") bombers escorted by 27 Navy Mitsubishi A6M3 Zero (Allied reporting name "Hamp" or "Zeke 32") fighters bomb Calcutta, India. Defending Royal Air Force Spitfire Vc and Hurricane Mark IIC fighters shoot down one Ki-21 and damage another, while Japanese aircraft shoot down three Hurricanes, killing two Hurricane pilots.
- December 8 – Aircraft from the U.S. Navy carriers USS Bunker Hill and USS Monterey strike Nauru in cooperation with a bombardment by surface warships; eight or ten of the 12 Japanese planes on the island are destroyed.
- December 10 – The Allied airstrip at Cape Torokina on Bougainville officially opens.
- December 13 – Since November 14, the Japanese have lost 122 aircraft based in the Marshall Islands.
- December 14 – Aircraft of the U.S. Army Air Forces′ Fifth Air Force attack Japanese forces at Arawe with 433 tons (393 metric tons) of bombs.
- December 15 – Fifth Air Force aircraft cover U.S. Army landings at Arawe. A strike on the landing forces by 64 Japanese naval aircraft is unsuccessful.
- December 16–17 – Almost continuous unopposed Japanese air attacks on the landing force at Arawe damage and destroy various U.S. landing craft and small craft.
- December 16–17 (overnight)
  - 493 British bombers attack Berlin. German night fighters intercept them continuously from the coast of the Netherlands all the way to the target, and 25 Lancasters (5.2 percent of the force) are shot down; the raid sees the first use of the British Serrate radar homing system, which four British night fighters use to attack German night fighters along the bombers' route, and they damage one Messerschmitt Bf 110. Most of the bombs fall on the city; the damage to railroads combines with people using trains to escape the bombing to delay supplies to German forces on the Eastern Front, and damage inflicted by this attack combines with that of earlier attacks to leave one-quarter of Berlin's housing destroyed. An additional 29 Lancasters crash upon returning to England due to low cloud cover at their bases.
  - RAF Bomber Command sends 47 bombers against two V-1 flying bomb launch sites near Abbeville, France. One raid fails, but the other, by No. 617 Squadron Lancasters employing 12,000-pound (5,400 kg) Tallboy bombs, damages its target.
- December 15–25 – Japanese aircraft at Rabaul bomb U.S. forces on Bougainville nightly, killing 38 and wounding 136.
- December 17 – For the first time, the Cape Torokina airstrip on Bougainville is used to stage the first Air Solomons (AirSols) raid on Rabaul.
- December 20 – Although badly wounded and partially blinded by a German 20-millimeter cannon shell that explodes in his face, Staff Sergeant Forrest L. Vosler, the radio operator/gunner aboard the U.S. Army Air Forces B-17F Flying Fortress Jersey Bounce Jr., continues to fire at enemy aircraft, fixes his damaged radio by touch alone, and sends distress signals before his plane ditches in the North Sea. He then saves the life of the bomber's tail gunner after the ditching. For his actions, he will receive the Medal of Honor.
- December 20–21 (overnight) – 650 British bombers raid Frankfurt-am-Main, Germany. German night fighters intercept them successfully and 41 British aircraft (6.3 percent) are lost. Despite the scattering of bombs due to cloud cover – which even leads to the city of Mainz being hit by mistake – the raid inflicts significant damage on Frankfurt-am-Main. A diversionary raid on Mannheim mostly misses the city but suffers no losses.
- December 21 – Rabaul-based Japanese aircraft make three dive-bombing attacks on U.S. forces unloading at Arawe.
- December 21–30 – Butaritari-based U.S. Army Air Forces Douglas A-24 Banshee dive bombers make nine strikes on Mili and one on Jaluit.
- December 23 – American aircraft based at Tarawa strike Nauru.
- December 23–24 – 379 British bombers raid Berlin, losing 16 (4.2 percent) of their number. They scatter their bombs widely due to cloud cover.
- December 23–25 – Air Solomons (AirSols) aircraft strike Rabaul heavily, U.S. Navy carrier aircraft strike Kavieng on New Ireland, and Fifth Air Force aircraft attack Japanese positions at Cape Gloucester and Cape Hoskins on New Britain.
- December 26 – 70 to 80 Japanese Rabaul-based aircraft attack U.S. ships supporting the day's U.S. landing at Cape Gloucester, sinking a destroyer and damaging two others. Minor raids follow on the next two days.
- December 26–27 – Japanese Rabaul-based aircraft raid U.S. forces off Arawe.
- December 28 – American aircraft based at Tarawa strike Nauru.
- December 29–30 (overnight) – 712 British bombers strike Berlin with the loss of 20 aircraft (2.8 percent of the force). Cloud cover makes them scatter their bombs, with many missing the city.
- December 31
  - Japanese Rabaul-based aircraft raid U.S. forces off Arawe, losing four aircraft.
  - Since mid-December, when they began staging through Tarawa Atoll, U.S. Army Air Forces B-24 Liberators have dropped 601 tonnes (592 long tons; 662 short tons) of bombs on the Marshall Islands.
  - Since June 1, there have been 135 major aircraft accidents on the "Hump" route between India and China. The accidents have taken 168 lives.
  - The U.S. Army officially activates the 555th Parachute Infantry Company, the first airborne infantry unit in history composed entirely of African Americans. Expanded into the 555th Parachute Infantry Battalion in 1944, it will be employed on smoke jumping duty, fighting forest fires in the Pacific Northwest.

== First flights ==
- Avro Lancastrian
- Fairchild XAT-14, prototype of the Fairchild AT-21 Gunner

=== January ===
- January 3 – Allied Aviation XLRA-1
- January 9 – Lockheed Constellation prototype NX67900
- January 15 – Vultee XP-54 Swoose Goose

=== February ===
- Goodyear FG-1 Corsair
- Tachikawa Ki-70 (Allied reporting name "Clara")
- February 4 – Bristol Buckingham

=== March ===
- March 5 – Gloster Meteor prototype DG206
- March 11 – Savoia-Marchetti SM.91
- March 24 – Bristol XLRQ-1

=== April ===
- Nakajima Ki-84 Hayate ("Gale"), Allied reporting name "Frank"
- April 8 – Douglas BTD Destroyer
- April 22 – Brewster XA-32

=== May ===
- May 8 – Savoia-Marchetti SM.95
- May 10 – Ilyushin Il-8
- May 15 – Nakajima C6N Saiun ("Painted Cloud"), Allied reporting name "Myrt"
- May 22 – Brewster XA-32

=== June ===
- June 15 – Arado Ar 234V1 GK+IV
- June 26 – Bell Model 30 single-rotor helicopter

=== July ===
- July 1 – Focke-Wulf Ta 154
- July 19 – Curtiss-Wright Curtiss-Wright XP-55 Ascender
- July 21 – Curtiss XP-62
- July 22 – Miles M.39B Libellula

=== August ===
- Yokosuka P1Y Ginga ("Milky Way"), Allied reporting name "Frances"
- August 7 – Ilyushin Il-6
- August 18 – Junkers Ju 352

=== September ===
- Curtiss XF14C-2
- Kawasaki Ki-96
- Kyushu Q1W Tokai ("Eastern Sea"), Allied reporting name "Lorna", the world's first airplane designed to specialize in antisubmarine warfare
- September 6 – Northrop XP-56 Black Bullet
- September 8 – Dornier Do 317
- September 20 – De Havilland Vampire prototype LZ548
- September 22 – DFS 228
- September 30 – Northrop XP-56 Black Bullet

=== October ===
- Savoia-Marchetti SM.92
- October 20 – Junkers Ju 390
- October 23 – Vickers Windsor
- October 26 – Dornier Do 335V1 CP+UA

=== November ===
- Aichi M6A Seiran ("Mountain Haze")
- November 17 – P-75 Eagle

=== December ===
- Kawasaki Ki-64
- December 2 – Grumman XF7F-1, prototype of the Grumman F7F Tigercat
- December 20 – Heinkel He 177B, first flight by the He 177 V102 prototype of the B-series He 177, with quartet of DB 603 "individual" engines.
- December 22 – Junkers Ju 388
- December 31 – Kawanishi N1K2-J Shiden Kai ("Violet Lightning Modified"), Allied reporting name "George"

== Entered service ==
- Fairchild AT-21 Gunner with the United States Army Air Forces

=== January ===
- Armstrong Whitworth Albemarle with No. 295 Squadron RAF
- Junkers Ju 252 with the German Luftwaffe
- January 10 – Fairey Barracuda with No. 827 Squadron FAA

=== February ===
- Kawasaki Ki-61 Hien ("Swallow)", Allied reporting name "Tony", with the Imperial Japanese Army Air Force 23rd Independent Squadron

=== October ===
- Bell P-63 Kingcobra

== Retirements ==
- Westland Wallace by the Royal Air Force

=== August ===
- Lioré et Olivier LeO H-47 by the Vichy French Navy

=== December ===
- Northrop N-3PB by the Royal Air Force's No. 330 (Norwegian) Squadron
- Westland Whirlwind by No. 263 Squadron, Royal Air Force
