= Yasuna Kozono =

WWII Japanese naval officer (1902–1960)

- 小園 安名
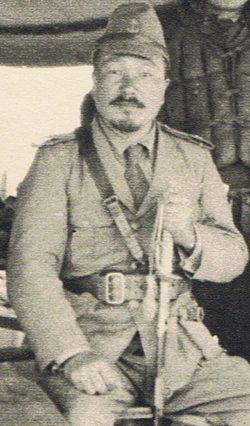
- Born: November 1, 1902; Minamisatsuma, Kagoshima, Japan
- Died: November 5, 1960 (aged 58); Japan
- Military career
- Allegiance: Empire of Japan
- Branch: Imperial Japanese Navy
- Rank: Captain (海軍大佐剥奪)
- Conflicts: World War II

Yasuna Kozono (小園 安名, Kozono Yasuna; November 1, 1902 – November 5, 1960) was an Imperial Japanese Navy officer who fought in the Second World War.

== Early life and education ==
He was born in Kagoshima Prefecture in Mansei City. He graduated from Tachikawa Junior Jigh School and entered the Japanese Naval Academy on August 26, 1920, graduating on July 14, 1923.

== In Rabaul ==
When he was the commander of a unit in Rabaul on New Britain he suggested modifying the ordnance fitment of the Nakajima J1N as a night fighter, which by 21 May 1943 was successful against B-24s and B-17s, although less so against B-29s.

== 1945 ==
Kozono was in command of Atsugi Aerodrome during the latter part of the Second World War, and initially refused to surrender. They printed leaflets and dropped them over the Kanto area calling for the war to be continued "to the end". Finally, 33 pilots left the base, and Douglas MacArthur arrived there on August 30. Weakened by malaria, Kozono was one of 70 soldiers to be arrested by the Imperial Japanese Navy for continuing to fight. They were all court-martialed for disobeying orders.

Kozono was stripped of his rank and pension, and sentenced to life imprisonment. The other soldiers received prison sentences ranging from four to eight years. However, in November 1946, everyone convicted in the case, with the exception of Kozono, was released under an amnesty. Kozono's sentence was later reduced to 20 years, then to 10 years. He was released on parole in December 1950 and amnestied in 1952. Kozono spent the rest of his life as a farmer after his release. He died of a cerebral hemorrhage in 1960.

== In popular media ==
Yasuna Kozono was portrayed by Jun Tazaki in the 1967 film Japan's Longest Day.
