= Vunakanau =

Vunakanau is situated on a plateau just outside Rabaul, Papua New Guinea. Vunakanau Airfield was used in World War II. In the 1970s Vunakau was proposed to be used as the new airstrip replacing Rabaul however this did not eventuate.

Situated at Vunakanua is the Vunakanau Teacher's College and the Riot Squad Police Base.
