= Operation Lehrgang =

German WWII military operation

Operation Lehrgang (German: Unternehmen Lehrgang), also translated as Operation Curriculum, was the evacuation of German and Italian forces from Sicily during World War II. Undertaken in mid-August 1943, Lehrgang evacuated just over 100,000 soldiers from Sicily, which had been the target of an Allied amphibious invasion since July.

== Etymology ==
The codename, Lehrgang, roughly translates to course or tutorial. Robert M. Citino offers the translations course of study and curriculum.

== History ==
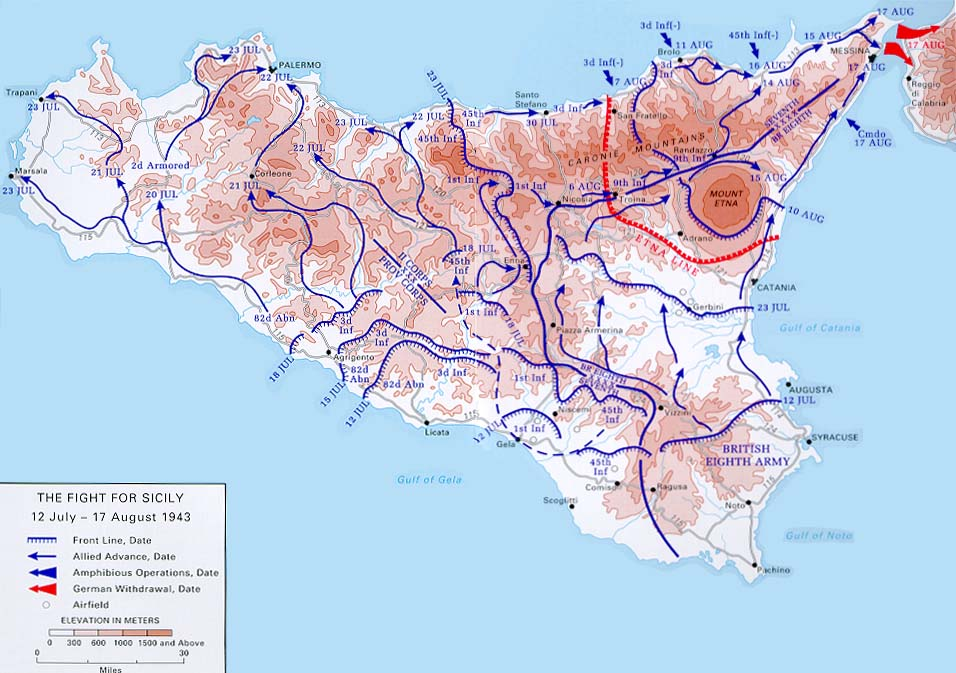
Sicily campaign, 12 July – 17 August 1943

Lehrgang was the codename given by German forces for the evacuation of Axis forces from Sicily, undertaken between 11 August and 17 August, 1943. After the beginning of the Allied invasion of Sicily ("Operation Husky"), it was quickly determined by OKW and the commander-in-chief of Army Group C (which contained all German forces in Italy), Albert Kesselring, that a repetition of the mass surrender of German forces at the end of the Tunisian campaign in May 1943 had to be avoided, and that an organized withdrawal from Sicily was preferable over a defense to the last man. The first official indication of Lehrgang's preparation was a meeting by senior operations officers in Frascati (Central Italy) chaired by Siegfried Westphal, Kesselring's chief of staff, who gave the operational details about Lehrgang. The evacuation plan was approved by Kesselring on 2 August and its execution authorized by him to the German commander of Axis forces in Sicily, Hans-Valentin Hube, on 8 August.

The operation was finished when the Pz. Div. "Hermann Göring" completed evacuation on August 16/17, after 29th Panzergrenadier Division had already done so on August 15/16 and 15th Panzergrenadier Division on August 11/12.

The evacuation between 11 and 17 August included 39,569 Wehrmacht troops with their weapons, 9,065 vehicles, 27 tanks, 94 heavy guns, 1,100 tons of ammunition, 970 tons of fuel. Between 3 and 17 August, a total of 62,000 Italian soldiers also reached the Italian mainland from Sicily. The operation was overseen by Gustav Freiherr von Liebenstein, the Sea Transport Leader (German: Seetransportführer) for the Strait of Messina.

In spite of Allied air attacks, losses were very low due to sufficient Axis anti-aircraft coverage.
