= Nakajima J1N Gekkō =

Fighter aircraft in Japan

J1N1 Gekkō
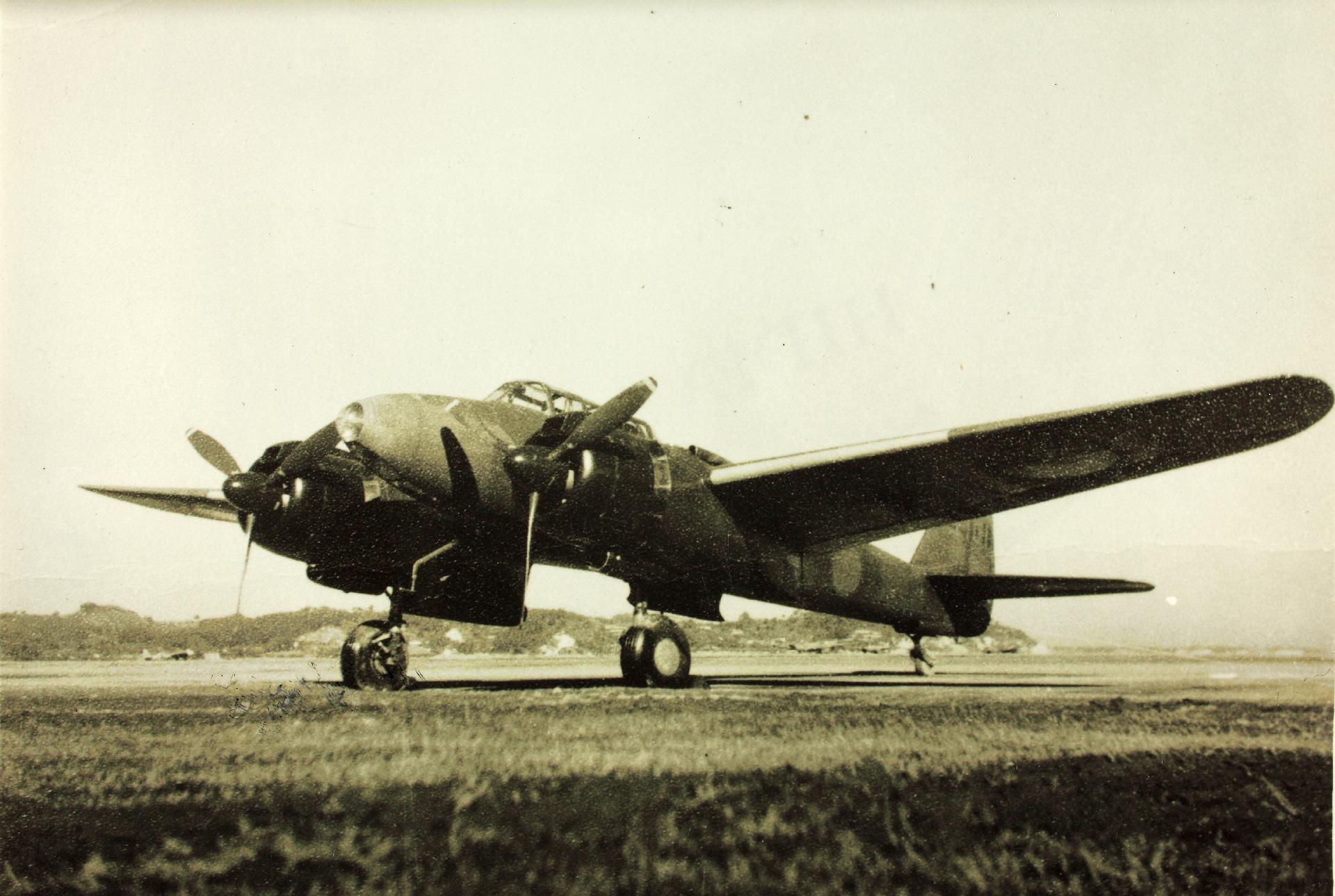
- Nakajima J1N1-S

General information
- Type: Heavy fighter, night fighter
- National origin: Japan
- Manufacturer: Nakajima Aircraft Company
- Status: Retired
- Primary user: Imperial Japanese Navy Air Service
- Number built: 479

History
- Manufactured: 1942–1944
- Introduction date: 1942
- First flight: May 1941
- Retired: 1945

The Nakajima J1N Gekkō (月光; moonlight) is a twin-engined heavy fighter designed and produced by the Nakajima Aircraft Company. It was assigned the Allied reporting name Irving.

The J1N was developed during the late 1930s and early 1940s at the behest of the Imperial Japanese Navy (IJN). Envisioned as an escort fighter, it was to be capable of escorting the service's principal bomber used at that time, the Mitsubishi G3M. The operating range of the IJN's standard fighter, the Mitsubishi A5M "Claude", was only 1,200 km (750 mi), insufficient compared with the 4,400 km (2,730 mi) of the G3M. Moreover, the potential of the Mitsubishi A6M Zero fighter, which was still under development at that time, remained to be evaluated, stressing the need for a long-range escort fighter, akin to the Luftwaffe's introduction of the Messerschmitt Bf 110 around this same timeframe. The first prototype made its maiden flight in May 1941. Despite originally being intended for escort role, when flight testing revealed numerous shortcomings, IJN planners ultimately refused to accept the type for this mission, instead, the existing airframes were reconfigured to perform the long distance aerial reconnaissance mission instead.

Following a redesign effort that simplified and lightened the airframe, the first production variant, the J1N1-C, entered service in late 1942. Starting in early 1943, initially at the initiative of Yasuna Kozono, numerous airframes underwent field modification to become night fighters, a role in which the aircraft proved to be quite effective. A dedicated night fighter variant, the J1N1-S, was subsequently put into production. The J1N was active during the Pacific War, during which it was frequently used to intercept Boeing B-29 Superfortresses over the Japanese home islands, resulting in the shooting down of numerous bombers. Towards the end of the conflict, numerous remaining aircraft were expended conducting kamikaze attacks targeting Allied shipping.

== Design and development ==
The origins of the Nakajima J1N Gekkō can be traced back to 1938 and the Second Sino-Japanese War; early combat experiences in the Chinese theatre had convinced several senior officials within the Imperial Japanese Navy (IJN) that the service required a capable long-range fighter. Specifically, existing fighters were unable to escort bombers, such as the Mitsubishi G3M, throughout strike missions against distant targets, such as Chinese airbases, resulting in heavy bomber losses being incurred while unescorted. Accordingly, in early 1938, the Japanese Naval Bureau of Aeronautics started formulating the 13-Shi specification to address this need. According to the aviation historian René Francillon, considerable influence upon this specification came from the Potez 630 heavy fighter that was being introduced by the French Air Force around this time. Ahead of being finalised, a preliminary draft of the specification was reviewed by several senior pilots.

As issued, this specification called for a twin-engined fighter that accommodated a three-man crew, possessed sufficient manoeuvrability to effectively dogfight with single-engined hostile fighters. Other performance stipulations included a maximum speed of no less than 280 kt, a normal range of 1,300 nm, a maximum range of 2,000 nm, and armaments to include a forward-firing 20 mm cannon and a 7.7 mm machine gun, as well as a flexibly-mounted rear-facing second machine gun. This specification was issued to both the Nakajima Aircraft Company and Mitsubishi.

Nakajima's design team, headed by Katsuji Nakamura, opted for a relatively clean monoplane configuration with a low-mounted wing. Power was provided by a pair of Nakajima NK1F Sakae 21 14-cylinder twin-row radial engine; in order to offset the torque produced, each propeller rotated in opposing directions to one another. As initially designed, armament comprised a 20 mm Type 99 Model 1 cannon and six 7.7 mm (.303 in) Type 97 aircraft machine guns grouped into pairs, one set firing forwards and the other two being installed within two tandem-mounted remotely-operated turrets fitted to the fuselage just aft of the pilot. These turrets, along with the retractable undercarriage and flaps, were hydraulically-powered. Initially, the aircraft lacked trailing edge flaps and leading edge slotted flaps, although both were present on the second prototype.

In May 1941, the first J1N1 prototype performed its maiden flight. While the first two prototypes were delivered to the IJN to undergo service trials in August 1941, the type quickly proved to be troublesome during flight testing. Specifically, the aircraft was overweight, the complex hydraulics and opposed-rotating propellers had issues, the remotely-operated turrets were too heavy and difficult to aim, unacceptable aileron vibration was encountered during rolls, and manoeuvrability was unsatisfactory. When contrasted against the Mitsubishi A6M Zero single-engined fighter, the J1N1 was inferior in all areas except for range. Accordingly, in October 1941, the IJN opted to reject it as a long range escort fighter.

Perhaps motivated by the fact that advanced preparations for quantity production had already been made, and several airframes were at various stages of completion, Nakajima was authorised to modify those existing airframes on the production line into prototypes of a fast land-based long range reconnaissance platform. During this redesign work, considerable attention was paid to reducing the aircraft's weight as well as to improving reliability. As such, the troublesome turrets were eliminated, fuel capable was reduced somewhat, and more conventional models of the Sakae engine were fitted. To offset the reduced internal fuel capacity, provisions for the fitting of two external drop tanks were implemented. A redesigned cockpit for both the pilot and radio operator/gunner, which was positioned more forward than the original, was one of the more apparent changes introduced during this phase of development; the navigator/observer was separately seated after of the wing's trailing edge.

This lighter reconnaissance variant, the J1N1-C, also known by the IJN designation Navy Type 2 Reconnaissance Plane, passed flight tests in July 1942. The J1N1-C lacked any armament except for a single 13 mm Type 2 machine-gun at the rear of the cockpit and a reconfigured fuselage. As the need for specialized aircraft was not viewed as being as urgent in comparison to standard types, production of the J1N1-C was relatively slow. 54 J1N1-C aircraft, including the prototypes, were produced by Nakajima between April 1942 and March 1943. The J1N1-C was redesignated as the J1N1-R (C for carrier-based, R for reconnaissance), and a several aircraft were fitted with a 20mm Type 99 gun in a turret behind the cockpit. One early variant, the J1N1-F, was furnished with a spherical turret, armed with a single Type 99 Model 1 cannon, that was mounted immediately aft of the pilot.

== Operational history ==
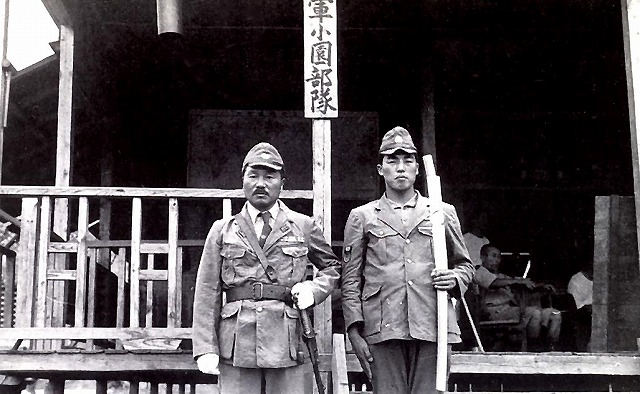
Commander Yasuna Kozono (left), Rabaul 1943.

In late 1942, the first J1N1-Cs were delivered to operational units of the Imperial Japanese Navy Air Service (IJNAS); it was first encountered by the Allied during the Solomon Islands campaign, where it was initially misidentified as being a fighter.

In early 1943, Commander Yasuna Kozono (小園 安名) of the 251st Kōkūtai in Rabaul came up with the idea of installing 20 mm cannons, firing upwards at a 30-degree angle in the fuselage. Against orders issued by central command, which was sceptical of the concept, Kozono tested it on a single J1N1-C as a night fighter. On 21 May 1943, this field-modified J1N1-C KAI successfully intercepted and shot down a pair of Consolidated B-24 Liberator bombers.

The Naval Staff, which had already came to recognise the need for a specialised night fighter, quickly took notice of Kozono's success and placed orders with Nakajima for the newly designated J1N1-S. This model was christened the Model 11 Gekkō (月光, "Moonlight"). It was operated by a crew of two, eliminating the navigator position. Like the KAI, it was armed with a pair of 20 mm Type 99 Model 1 cannon firing upward in a 30° upward angle, but also added a second pair that fired downward at a forward 30° angle, allowing attacks from above or below. Production of the type was quickly ramped up, with 183 aircraft produced between April 1943 and March 1944, and a further 204 aircraft completed before production was terminated in December 1944.

Operationally, the J1N1-S proved to be effective against both the United States Army Air Force's (USAAF) Boeing B-17 Flying Fortress and B-24 Liberator bombers, which were usually armed with Sperry ball turrets for ventral defense. The Gekkō's existence was not quickly understood by the Allies, who assumed the Japanese did not have the technology for night fighter designs. Some aircraft were equipped with the Type 3 Mk. 6 Model 4 radar in the nose to detect enemy ships at night, while others were equipped with a searchlight in place of the radar. Later models, the J1N1-Sa, omitted the two downward-firing guns and added another 20 mm cannon to face upward as with the other two. Other variants without nose antennae or searchlight added a 20 mm cannon to the nose.

The J1N1-S was frequently used against USAAF Boeing B-29 Superfortresses over the Japanese home islands, though the lack of good radar and insufficient high-altitude performance handicapped the aircraft since it could usually only perform a single pass against the higher-speed B-29s. However, some skillful pilots had achieved considerable successes, such as Lieutenant Sachio Endo, who was credited with destroying eight B-29s and damaging another eight before he was shot down by a B-29 crew, Shigetoshi Kudo (nine victories), Shiro Kurotori (six victories), and Juzo Kuramoto (eight victories); the last two claimed five B-29s during the night of 25–26 May 1945. Another Gekkō crew shot down five B-29s during a single night, but these successes were uncommon. Many Gekkō's were also shot down or destroyed on the ground.

In the closing year of the conflict, Japan opted to expend many of its remaining J1Ns on kamikaze attacks.

== Variants ==
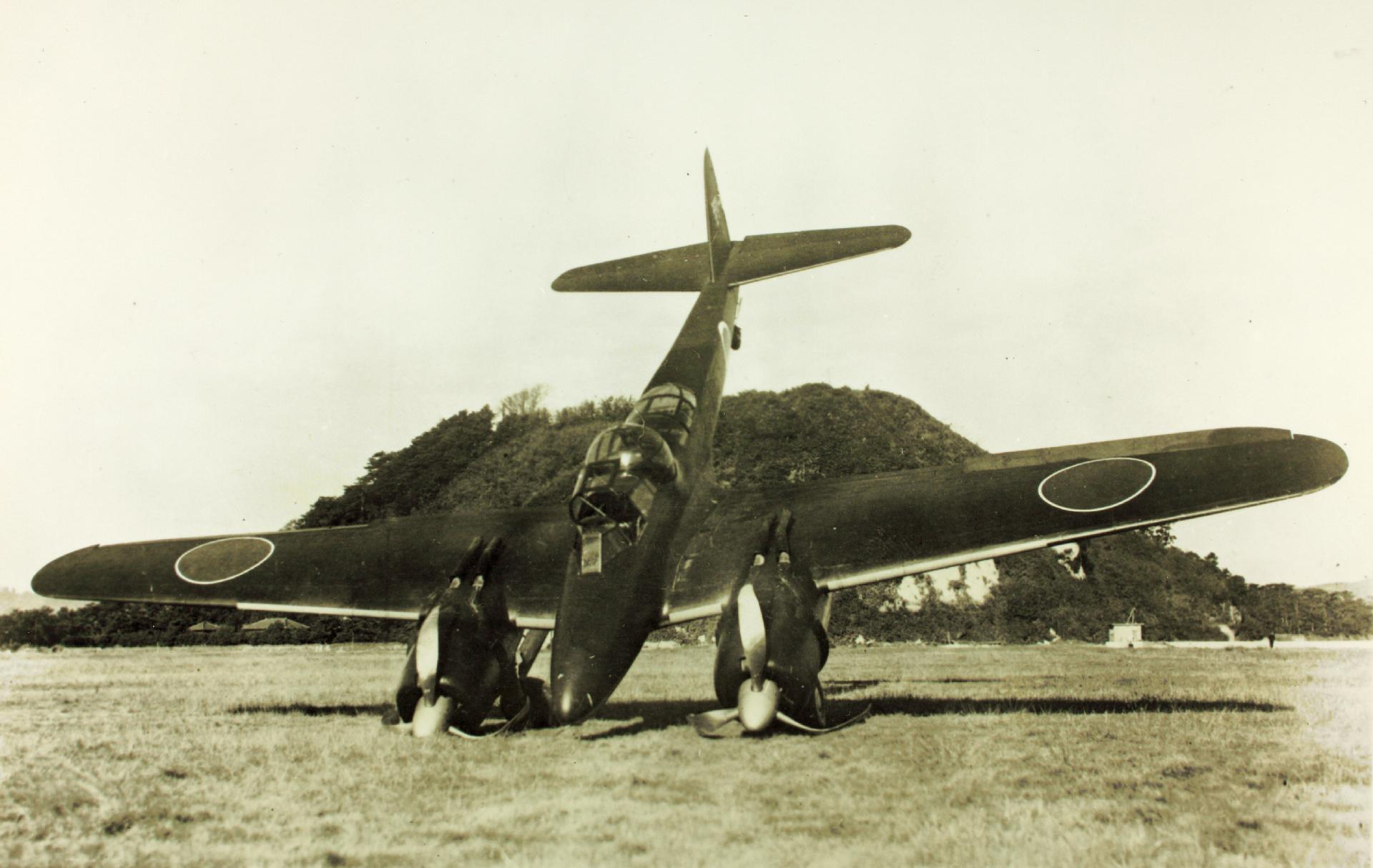
J1N1-F Reconnaissance modified with 20mm gun turret

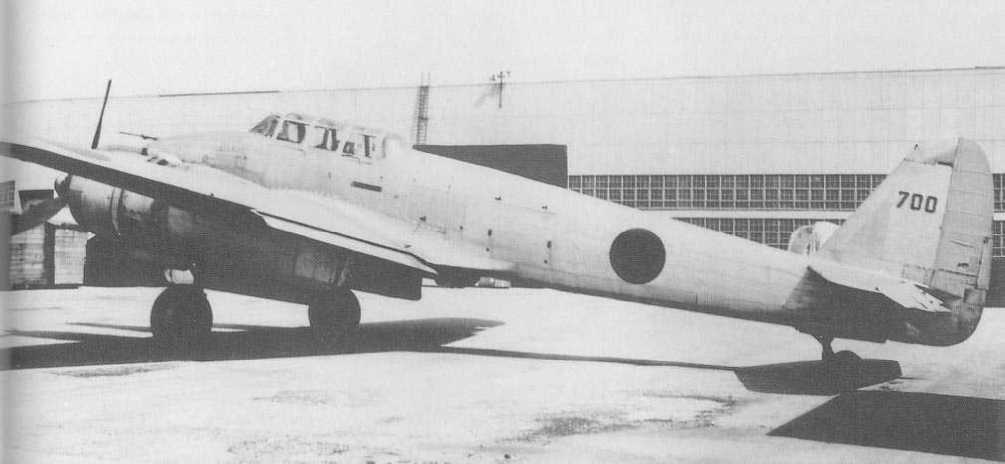
J1N1-S Night fighter with airborne radar although no armament is pictured here

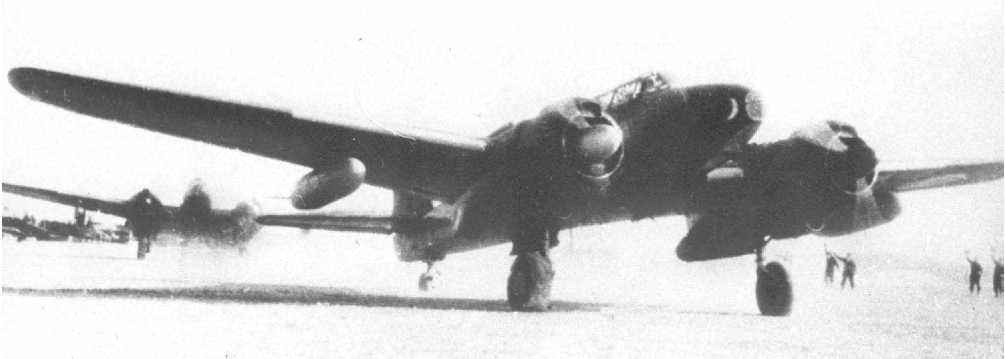
J1N1-S of the 210th Kōkūtai with drop tanks

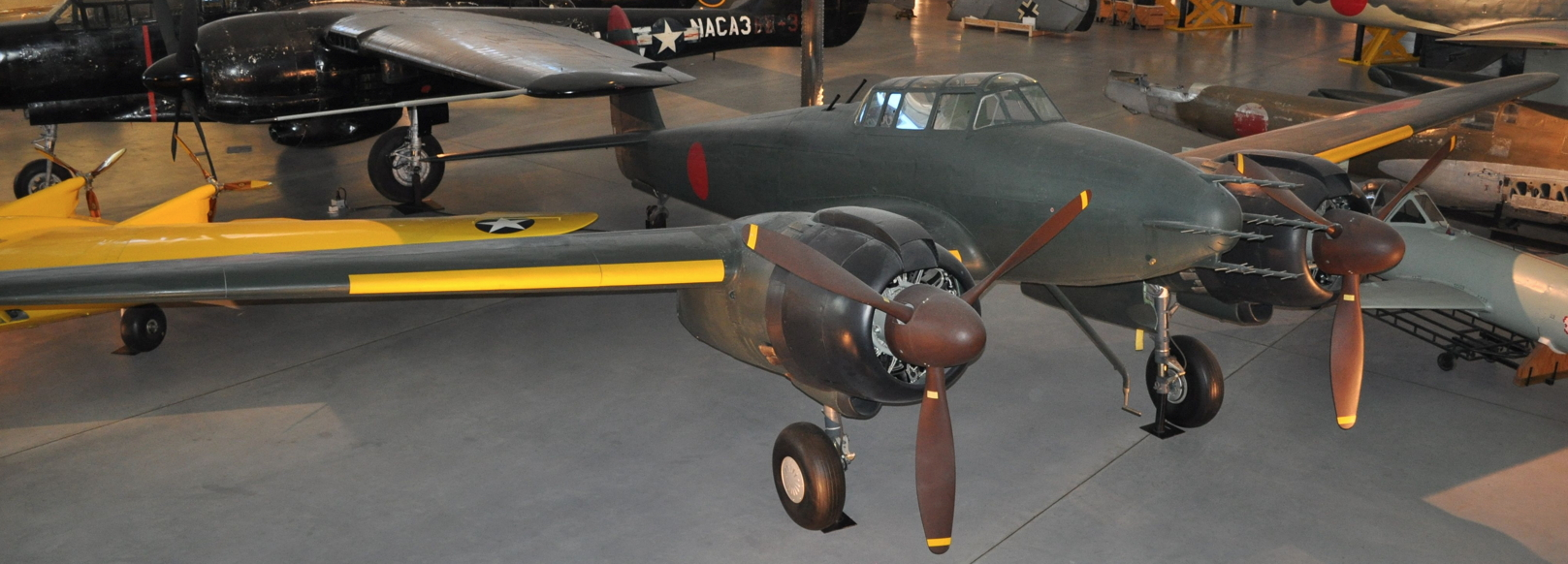
Nakajima J1N at the Steven F. Udvar-Hazy Center

- J1N1

Three seaters long-range fighter. Two of prototypes and seven of supplementary prototypes.

- J1N1 Kai

Night Fighter converted from J1N1.

- J1N1-C

Long-range reconnaissance aircraft. Later re-designated J1N1-R.

- J1N1-C Kai

Night Fighter converted from J1N1-C.

- J1N1-R

Long-range reconnaissance aircraft.

- J1N1-F

Observation aircraft. A little number of prototypes only. Equipped G5N2 turret or G4M2 turret.

- J1N1-S

Night fighter aircraft. Armed with 2 × 20 mm forward up-firing Type 99 cannons and 2 × 20 mm forward under-firing Type 99 cannons.

- J1N1-Sa

Night Fighter same as above, armed with 3 × 20 mm forward up-firing Type 99 cannons.

== Surviving aircraft ==
Only one J1N1-S Gekkō survives today. Following the occupation of the home islands, U.S. forces gathered 145 interesting Japanese aircraft and sent them to the United States aboard three aircraft carriers. Four Gekkō's were in this group: three captured at Atsugi and one from Yokosuka. Serial Number 7334, the aircraft from Yokosuka, was given Foreign Equipment number FE 3031 (later changed to T2-N700). Records show that after arriving aboard the USS Barnes, air intelligence officials assigned Gekkō 7334 to Langley Field, Virginia, on 8 December 1945. The airplane was moved to the Air Materiel Depot at Middletown, Pennsylvania, on 23 January 1946.

The Maintenance Division at Middletown prepared the Gekkō for flight tests, overhauling the plane's engines (the same make/model as the Zero had used) and replacing the oxygen system, radios, and some flight instruments with American equipment. Mechanics completed this work by 9 April. The Navy transferred Gekkō 7334 to the Army in early June, and an army pilot flew the Gekkō on 15 June 1946, for about 35 minutes. At least one other test flight took place before the Army Air Forces flew the fighter to an empty former Douglas C-54 factory at Park Ridge, Illinois, for storage. The remaining three Gekkōs were scrapped.

In 1949, the Gekkō was given to the Smithsonian's National Air and Space Museum, but remained in storage at Park Ridge, Illinois. The collection of museum aircraft at Park Ridge numbered more than 60 airplanes when the Korean War compelled the United States Air Force to relocate it to the Paul E. Garber Preservation, Restoration, and Storage Facility in Suitland, Maryland. Gekkō 7334 was dumped outside the restoration facility in a large shipping crate in 1953 where it remained until building space became available in 1974. In 1979, NASM staff selected Gekkō 7334 for restoration.

Following restoration of the museum's Mitsubishi Zero in 1976, the Gekkō became the second Japanese aircraft to be restored by NASM. The airframe was found to be seriously corroded from being outside for twenty years. At that time, it was the largest and most complex aircraft restoration project the NASM had undertaken. Work started on 7 September 1979, and ended on 14 December 1983, following 17,000 hours of work. Today, Gekkō 7334 is fully restored and on display in the Steven F. Udvar-Hazy Center in Chantilly, Virginia, US.

== Specifications (J1N1-S) ==
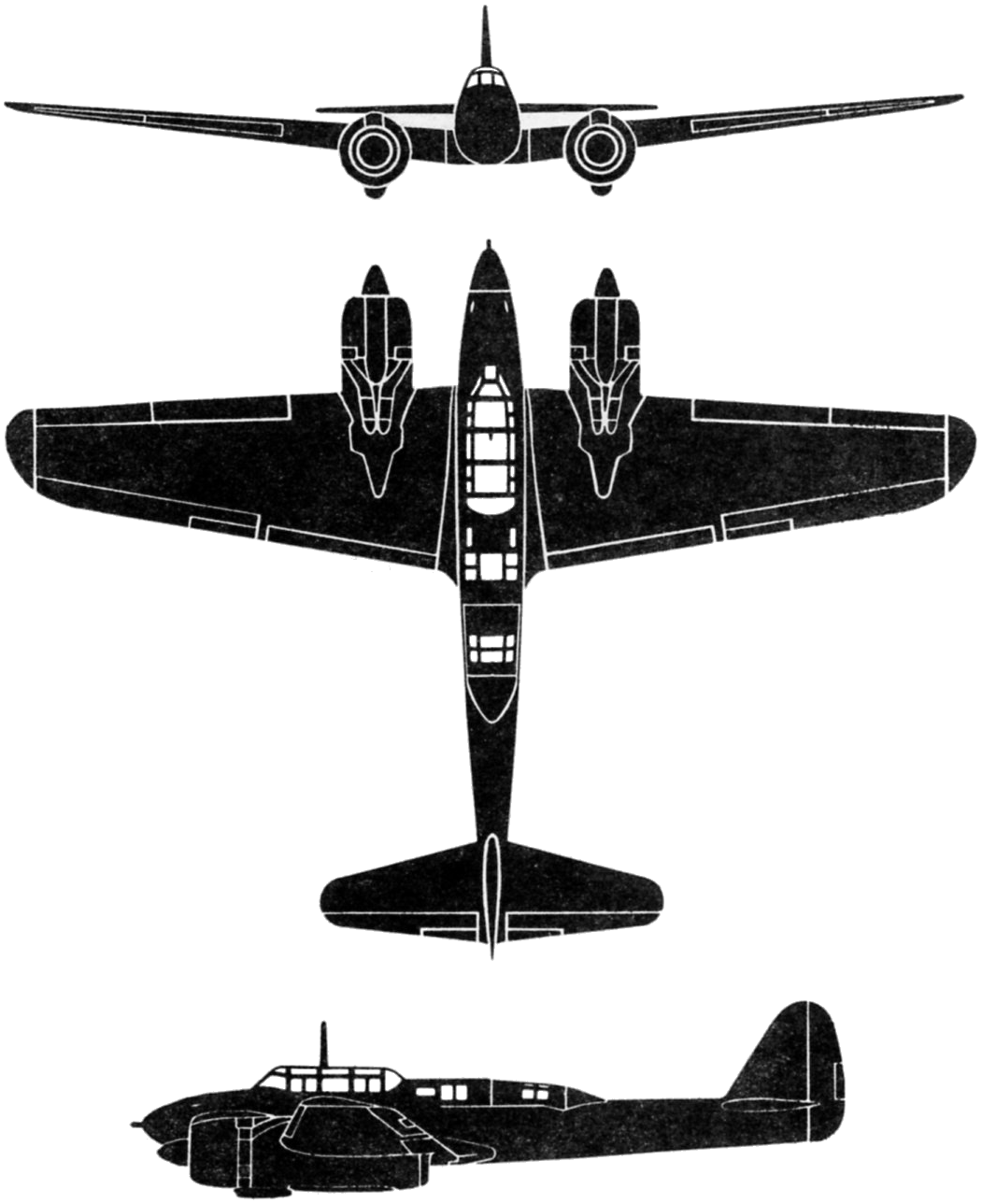
3-view silhouette of the Nakajima J1N

Data from Japanese Aircraft of the Pacific War

General characteristics

- Crew: 2
- Length: 12.77 m (41 ft 11 in)
- Wingspan: 16.98 m (55 ft 9 in)
- Height: 4.562 m (15 ft 0 in)
- Wing area: 40 m^{2} (430 sq ft)
- Empty weight: 4,480 kg (9,877 lb)
- Gross weight: 7,010 kg (15,454 lb)
- Max takeoff weight: 8,184 kg (18,043 lb)
- Fuel capacity: 1,700 L (373.9 imp gal)
- Powerplant: 2 × Nakajima NK1F Sakae 21 14-cylinder two-row air-cooled radial piston engine, 840 kW (1,130 hp) each take-off rating

820 kW (1,100 hp) at 2,850 m (9,350 ft)
730 kW (980 hp) at 6,000 m (20,000 ft)

- Propellers: 3-bladed un-handed metal constant-speed propellers

Performance

- Maximum speed: 507 km/h (315 mph, 274 kn) at 5,840 m (19,160 ft)
- Cruise speed: 330 km/h (210 mph, 180 kn) at 4,000 m (13,000 ft)
- Range: 2,545 km (1,581 mi, 1,374 nmi)
- Ferry range: 3,780 km (2,350 mi, 2,040 nmi)
- Rate of climb: 8.7 m/s (1,710 ft/min)
- Time to altitude: 5,000 m (16,000 ft) in nine minutes and 35 seconds
- Wing loading: 175.3 kg/m^{2} (35.9 lb/sq ft)
- Power/mass: 0.27 kW/kg (0.125 hp/lb)

Armament

- Guns: 4× 20 mm Type 99 cannon, two upward- and two downward-firing

or 2× 20 mm Type 99 cannon, firing upward only
or 3× 20 mm Type 99 cannon, all three firing upward

== See also ==
Aircraft of comparable role, configuration, and era

- Bristol Beaufighter
- De Havilland Mosquito
- Douglas P-70 Havoc
- Kawasaki Ki-45
- Messerschmitt Bf 110
- Mitsubishi Ki-46

Related lists

- List of aircraft of Japan during World War II
- List of aircraft of World War II
