= List of Pan Am accidents and incidents =

This is a list of accidents and incidents involving American airline Pan Am

This is a list of accidents and incidents involving American airline Pan Am. The airline suffered a total of 95 incidents.

== Fatal accidents ==
=== 1920s ===
August 15, 1928
Fokker C-2 NC53 General Machado ditched in the Gulf of Mexico off Egmont Key, Florida after all three engines stopped due to fuel exhaustion, killing one person. The pilot had become disorientated in poor visibility.

June 13, 1929
Fokker F-10 NC9700 Christopher Columbus struck telephone lines and crashed on takeoff from Santiago Airport, killing two of five on board. The runway was waterlogged and the aircraft failed to gain sufficient altitude.

=== 1930s ===
December 20, 1935
Sikorsky S-42 NC824M Puerto Rican Clipper lost control and crashed on landing at Port of Spain and sank, killing three of 25 on board.

April 11, 1936
Sikorsky S-42 NC15374 Antilles Clipper crashed on takeoff from Port of Spain, killing three of 22 on board. On liftoff the pilot noticed a fishing boat in the aircraft's path and performed a sharp turn, but a pontoon struck the boat and the aircraft crashed. The crew noticed the boat too late and the evasive maneuver was also too late. Despite the crash, the aircraft was repaired and returned to service until 1946.

January 11, 1938
Sikorsky S-42 NC16734 Samoan Clipper exploded in mid-air over Pago Pago while dumping fuel, killing all seven on board, including pilot Ed Musick. An hour after takeoff the aircraft developed an oil leak and the crew decided to return to Pago Pago. Fully loaded with fuel, the aircraft was too heavy to land in the small harbor and the crew began dumping fuel, but during this process the fuel ignited and the aircraft exploded. Fuel vapors probably became trapped in a wing flap when it was extended.

July 28, 1938
Flight 229, operated by Martin M-130 NC14714 Hawaii Clipper, disappeared over the Pacific Ocean between Guam and Manila with 15 on board.

August 13, 1939
Sikorsky S-43 NC16933 crashed in Guanabara Bay due to loss of control following engine failure, killing 14 of 16 on board.

=== 1940s ===
October 3, 1941
Flight 203, operated by Sikorsky S-42 NC15376 Dominican Clipper, crashed on landing in San Juan harbor, Puerto Rico due to pilot error, killing two of 27 on board.

December 11, 1941
Sikorsky S-38B NC21V crashed in Biscayne Bay off Miami during a training flight for reasons unknown, killing the three crew.

January 21, 1943
Flight 1104, a Martin M-130 named Philippine Clipper, struck a mountain near Ukiah, California due to pilot error, killing all 19 on board including U.S Navy Rear Admiral Robert H. English.

February 20, 1943
Cessna T-50 NC25488 went missing during an instrument training flight with three on board. Parts from the aircraft were found in the sea 2 mi south of Fowey Rock Lighthouse in the Gulf of Mexico.

February 22, 1943
Flight 9035, operated by Boeing 314A Clipper NC16803 Yankee Clipper, crashed in the River Tagus while preparing to land at Lisbon after the left wing struck the water's surface, killing 24 of 39 on board, including American actress Tamara Drasin and American novelist Ben Robertson. The aircraft was operating a USO flight.

June 20, 1943
Douglas C-49K 43-2009 crashed in Biscayne Bay, killing two people.

September 24, 1943
Consolidated Commodore NC668M stalled and crashed in Biscayne Bay during a test flight, killing one of three on board. The elevator controls were locked.

April 6, 1944
Pilgrim 100B NC742N crashed 10 miles east of Nome, Alaska due to pilot error, killing all six on board.

August 8, 1944
Flight 218, operated by Sikorsky S-42 (NC823M) Hong Kong Clipper, lost control and crashed on takeoff from Antilla Airport, Cuba, killing 17 of 31 on board.

January 8, 1945
Flight 161, operated by Martin M-130 (NC14716) China Clipper, crashed short of its landing site at Port of Spain due to pilot error, killing 23 of 30 on board.

August 3, 1945
Flight 216, operated by Sikorsky S-43 NC15066, crashed on landing at Fort de France Hydrobase, Martinique, killing four of 14 on board. The water surface was too rough for landing.

June 19, 1947
Flight 121, operated by Lockheed L-049 Constellation Clipper Eclipse (formerly Clipper Dublin), crashed in the Syrian desert near Mayadin following failure of one engine and fire and separation of another, killing 15 of 36 on board; Gene Roddenberry, creator of the original Star Trek, was among the survivors.

October 26, 1947
Flight 923, operated by Douglas DC-4 Clipper Talisman II struck Tamgas Mountain on Annette Island, Alaska, for reasons unknown, killing all 18 on board.

April 15, 1948
Flight 1-10, operated by Lockheed L-049 Constellation Clipper Empress of the Skies, crashed short of the runway at Shannon Airport due to a mechanical and/or electrical failure, killing 30 of 31 on board

=== 1950s ===
June 22, 1951
Flight 151, operated by Lockheed L-049 Constellation Clipper Great Republic, struck a hill near Sanoyie, Liberia due to pilot error, killing all 40 on board.

April 11, 1952
Flight 526A, operated by Douglas DC-4 Clipper Endeavor, ditched in the sea off Puerto Rico following double engine failure, killing 52 of 69 on board. The engine failures were caused by faulty parts and improper maintenance. In July 2026, searchers found the wreckage 2,000 feet below the Atlantic Ocean off Puerto Rico.

April 29, 1952
Flight 202, operated by Boeing 377-10-26 Stratocruiser Clipper Good Hope, lost control and broke up in mid-air for reasons unknown and crashed in the Amazon Basin some 281 miles southwest of Carolina, Brazil, killing all 50 on board. The number two engine had separated from the wing, possibly due to a propeller failure. The accident remains the deadliest involving the Boeing 377.

July 27, 1952
Flight 201, a Boeing 377-10-26 Stratocruiser (N1030V), experienced an explosive decompression shortly after takeoff from Rio de Janeiro when the cabin door blew open. A passenger was sucked out of the aircraft and killed but the aircraft returned safely to Rio de Janeiro. The cabin door was not properly locked.

March 26, 1955
Flight 845/26, operated by Boeing 377-10-26 Stratocruiser Clipper United States, ditched in the Pacific Ocean following the separation of the number three engine, killing four of 23 on board.

January 19, 1957
A technician stole a Douglas DC-3 (N33374) at Idlewild Airport (now John F. Kennedy International Airport) and was able to climb to 150 feet before the aircraft stalled and crashed near the runway, killing him.

November 8, 1957
Flight 7, operated by Boeing 377-10-29 Stratocruiser Clipper Romance of the Skies, disappeared while on the San Francisco-Honolulu leg of a round-the-world flight with 44 on board; wreckage and 19 bodies were found six days later 900 miles northeast of Honolulu and 90 miles north of the intended flight route. The cause of the crash was not determined, but an overspeeding engine leading to a ditching was the likely cause.

June 2, 1958
Boeing 377-10-26 Stratocruiser N1023V (former NX1023V Clipper America) Clipper Golden Gate landed hard at Manila, collapsing the landing gear. The aircraft then skidded and swerved to the right and stopping 2850 feet past the runway threshold and 27 feet from the edge of the runway. One passenger was killed when a blade broke off the number three propeller and penetrated the fuselage.

September 12, 1959
Douglas DC-4 N88900 Clipper Fearless struck a mountain near Mercedes, Honduras following an unexplained deviation from the flight route, killing the three crew.

=== 1960s ===
December 8, 1963
Flight 214, operated by Boeing 707-121 Clipper Tradewind was struck by lightning and crashed at Elkton, Maryland following a fuel tank explosion, killing all 81 on board. Lightning discharge wicks were installed on all aircraft after this accident.

September 17, 1965
Flight 292, operated by Boeing 707-121B Clipper Constitution, struck Chances Peak on Montserrat due to pilot error, killing all 30 on board.

November 15, 1966
Flight 708, operated by Boeing 727-21 Clipper München, crashed near Dallgow (then in East Berlin) following an unexplained descent, killing the three crew. The Soviets returned about 50% of the wreckage, not including some major components such as the flight data and cockpit voice recorders, flight control systems, navigation and communication equipment.

June 13, 1968
Flight 1, operated by Boeing 707-321C (N798PA) Clipper Caribbean, struck a tree and crashed near Dum Dum Airport (now Netaji Subhas Chandra Bose International Airport) in Calcutta, India (now Kolkata) after the pilots set the altimeter incorrectly, killing six of 63 on board. The pilots misunderstood the pressure reported to them by ATC and instead of setting QNH at 993 mb, they set QFE at 29.93 in/hg and this caused a 360 foot difference in indicated altitude.

December 12, 1968
Flight 217, operated by Boeing 707-321B (N494PA) Clipper Malay, crashed in the sea off Caracas, Venezuela, likely due to an optical illusion created by city lights on an upslope, killing all 51 on board.

December 26, 1968
Flight 799, operated by Boeing 707-321C Clipper Racer, crashed on takeoff from Elmendorf AFB due to the crews failure to deploy the flaps, killing the three crew.

=== 1970s ===
July 25, 1971
Flight 6005, operated by Boeing 707-321C (N461PA) Clipper Rising Sun, struck Mount Kamunay while on approach to Manila due to a premature descent caused by poor CRM, killing the four crew.

July 22, 1973
Flight 816, operated by Boeing 707-321B Clipper Winged Racer, crashed on takeoff from Faa'a International Airport for reasons unknown, killing 78 of 79 on board. The accidents remains the deadliest in French Polynesia.

November 3, 1973
Flight 160, operated by Boeing 707-321C N458PA Clipper Titian, crashed while attempting to return to Boston due to smoke in the cockpit, killing the three crew.

December 17, 1973
Flight 110, operated by Boeing 707-321B (N407PA) Clipper Celestial was firebombed while parked at Fiumicino Airport by Palestinian terrorists, killing 30 of 177 on board; the terrorists then killed a guard and hijacked Lufthansa Flight 303, a Boeing 737, to Kuwait.

January 30, 1974
Flight 806, operated by Boeing 707-321B Clipper Radiant, crashed on approach to Pago Pago after encountering windshear from a microburst, killing 96 of 101 on board.

April 22, 1974
Flight 812, operated by Boeing 707-321B Clipper Climax struck the side of Mesehe Mountain (42 miles northwest of Denpasar) due to a navigation error caused by instrument failure, killing all 107 on board.

March 27, 1977
Flight 1736, operated by Boeing 747-121 Clipper Victor, collided on the runway with KLM Flight 4805, also a Boeing 747, at Los Rodeos Airport (now Tenerife North Airport) after the KLM captain’s decision to take off without ATC clearance. The collision killed all 248 on board the KLM 747 and 335 of 396 on board the Pan Am 747. With 583 total casualties, the disaster remains the deadliest in commercial aviation history.

=== 1980s ===
July 9, 1982
Flight 759, operated by Boeing 727-235 Clipper Defiance, crashed on climbout from New Orleans after encountering windshear from a microburst, killing all 145 on board and another eight on the ground.

August 11, 1982
A bomb planted on board Flight 830, operated by Boeing 747-121 Clipper Ocean Rover, exploded, killing a Japanese national, 16 year-old Toru Ozawa. The aircraft made an emergency landing at Honolulu with no further casualties. The bomb had been placed by Mohammed Rashed, a Jordanian connected to the 15 May Organization.

September 5, 1986

Pan Am Flight 73 was hijacked on 5 September 1986 while on the ground at Karachi International Airport, Pakistan. The hijackers, identified as members of the Abu Nidal Organization, took control of the aircraft, resulting in a standoff that lasted several hours. During the incident, senior purser Neerja Bhanot assisted in the evacuation of passengers and was killed while helping others escape. She was posthumously recognized for her actions. The hijacking resulted in 22 fatalities.

December 21, 1988
Flight 103, operated by Boeing 747-121A Clipper Maid of the Seas, exploded and broke-up in mid air over Lockerbie, Scotland after a bomb was placed on board, killing all 259 on board and another 11 on the ground.

== Non-fatal accidents ==
=== 1930s ===
September 3, 1930
Fokker F-10 NC810H was destroyed by a hurricane while parked at Santo Domingo, Dominican Republic.

October 2, 1932
Ford 5-AT-B Trimotor NC9664 crashed in bad weather at El Aceituno, Choluteca, Honduras; no casualties.

April 16, 1935
Consolidated Commodore NC660M burned out in a hangar fire in Miami, Florida.

April 25, 1938
Flight 105, operated by a Sikorsky S-43 (NC16932), stalled and crashed in the Caribbean Sea off Kingston, Jamaica following engine failure caused by fuel system problems; the aircraft sank but all 18 on board survived.

July 15, 1938
Douglas DC-3-228 NC18114 crashed into a hospital at Morón, Argentina while attempting to return to Ituzaingo Airport following engine failure, killing one person on the ground; all 13 on board the DC-3 survived.

February 19, 1939
Sikorsky S-42 NC15376 Dominican Clipper porpoised (bounced) on landing and struck a swell and rose up, but just as power was applied, the left pontoon struck the water and the aircraft waterlooped and came to rest partially submerged; all 30 on board survived. The aircraft was repaired and returned to service but was lost in the crash of Flight 203 in 1941.

=== 1940s ===
December 8, 1941
Sikorsky S-42B NC16735 Hong Kong Clipper II was destroyed on the ground during the Battle of Hong Kong.

March 10, 1942
Douglas DC-3-270 NC21750 burned out while parked at Khartoum, Sudan; the aircraft was operated by Pan Am's African division.

July 27, 1943
Sikorsky S-42B NC16736 Bermuda Clipper burned out while parked on the Rio Negro at Manaus, Brazil. While parked and fully loaded with passengers and crew, a fire started in the carburetor on engine number one and the pilot told the mechanic to pull the fire extinguisher handle but the mechanic pulled the fuel dump handle by mistake. Burning fuel fell from the carburetor onto fuel that had been dumped onto the water, igniting it as well and catching the aircraft on fire. There were no casualties.

June 4, 1945
Douglas DC-3-228F NC33611 crashed on takeoff from Piarco Airport; all 12 on board survived.

November 4, 1945
Honolulu Clipper, the prototype Boeing 314 Clipper, force-landed in the Pacific, 625 miles off Hawaii following double engine failure. After an unsuccessful attempt to repair the engines at sea, the aircraft was to be towed to port, but the aircraft was damaged in the attempt and was intentionally sunk by US Navy gunfire as salvage was deemed impractical. The aircraft was operating an Operation Magic Carpet flight, carrying 26 military personnel back to the US after service in the Pacific.

September 24, 1946
Lockheed L-049 Constellation NC88831 Clipper Caribbean landed wheels-up due to pilot error; all 36 on board survived. The pilot called for 'flaps up' but the co-pilot raised the landing gear by mistake.

September 20, 1947
Flight 131, a Douglas DC-4 (NC88911), landed short and skidded while landing at Floyd Bennett Field, New York, following double engine failure and in-flight fire; all 41 on board survived. Three hours into the flight the pilot attempted to operate the number three and four engines from their main fuel tanks following problems with the right side fuel system, but both engines failed later. The aircraft continued on two engines until the fire warning light came on for engines three and four. Smoke was seen coming from the number three engine and the CO2 bottle was discharged. The right side landing gear then came down with a burning tire. Full power was applied to maintain altitude as the crew prepared for a ditching, but the aircraft was able to reach the airport. Electricity was arcing between the main battery bus and an engine pulley control bracket on the number three engine.

April 29, 1948
A Douglas DC-3A was struck by rifle fire on takeoff from San José, Costa Rica with several rounds penetrating the fuselage, blowing out a tire and striking a propeller blade. Despite the attack, the aircraft was able to safely continue to its destination.

December 9, 1948
Flight 428, a Convair CV-240-2 (NC90665), ran off the runway while taking off from Rancho Boyeros Airport, Cuba; no casualties. The aircraft was repaired and returned to service.

January 26, 1949
Curtiss C-46F NC1241N stalled and crashed at Asmara International Airport while attempting to return following a loss of power on engine number two on takeoff; all four crew survived. The aircraft was leased from the USAF.

January 30, 1949
Flight 100, operated by Lockheed L-749 Constellation NC86530 Clipper Monarch of the Skies, collided in mid-air with a private Cessna 140 (NC76891) over Port Washington, New York; the Cessna crashed, killing both pilots; the Constellation landed safely at Mitchell AFB.

=== 1950s ===
June 15, 1950
Curtiss C-46F N74170 force-landed near Merida, Mexico following separation of the number two propeller; both pilots survived. A failure in the master rod bearing and crankshaft caused the propeller separation. The aircraft was leased from the USAF.

August 8, 1951
Curtiss C-46F N74176 overran the runway on landing at Congonhas Airport, Brazil after landing too late; all three crew survived. The aircraft was leased from the USAF.

September 2, 1951
Flight 507, a Convair CV-240-2 (N90662), crashed in the sea while on approach to Kingston, Jamaica due to crew errors; all 34 on board survived.

October 16, 1956
Flight 6, operated by Boeing 377-10-29 Stratocruiser Clipper Sovereign of the Skies (ex. AOA Flagship Holland), ditched in the Pacific Ocean due to double engine failure following an overspeed incident; all 31 on board survived.

February 1, 1958
Flight 70, operated by Douglas DC-7C N733PA, Clipper Bluejacket, landed wheels-up at Schiphol International Airport due to pilot error; all 16 on board survived. Just before landing the co-pilot decided to abandon the approach and ordered the landing gear up and takeoff power. The pilot then took control, ordered the gear down and proceeded to complete the landing. The landing gear was not all the way down and locked.

February 3, 1959
Flight 115, operated by Boeing 707-123 Clipper Washington, suffered a jet upset episode over the Atlantic when the autopilot disengaged after the co-pilot left his seat; the aircraft descended to 6000 feet before the pilots regained control after which the aircraft landed safely at Gander, Newfoundland with no casualties to the 129 on board.

February 20, 1959
Douglas DC-7C N740PA Clipper Gauntlet crashed on the runway at San Francisco International Airport during a training flight due to excessive descent; all three crew survived.

February 25, 1959
Boeing 707-121 N709PA Clipper America entered a spin over Chartres, France during a training flight while practicing a two-engine minimum control condition. The pilots were able to recover, but the number four engine separated from the wing and an emergency landing was performed at London with no casualties to the five crew. The pilot failed to maintain flying speed during the maneuver. The aircraft was repaired and returned to service but was lost following the crash of Flight 214 in 1963.

April 10, 1959
Boeing 377-10-26 Stratocruiser N1033V Clipper Midnight Sun struck an embankment after landing short at Juneau International Airport; all 10 on board survived.

June 22, 1959
Douglas DC-6B Clipper Panama burned out on the runway at Shannon Airport after the number four engine fell off the wing due to a broken propeller blade; all eight on board survived. The number one blade on the number four propeller failed due to fatigue; the blade had been bent sometime in the past and this bending weakened the metal.

=== 1960s ===
February 18, 1961
Douglas DC-7CF N745PA Clipper Fortune belly-landed at Echterdingen Airport after it struck a 10 foot tall dirt mound while on approach; all three crew survived.

April 7, 1964
Flight 212, operated by Boeing 707-139 N779PA Clipper Southern Cross, overran the runway while landing at John F. Kennedy International Airport after landing too far down the runway due to pilot error; all 145 on board survived.

June 28, 1965
Flight 843, operated by Boeing 707-321B Clipper Friendship, suffered an uncontained failure on engine number four shortly after takeoff from San Francisco at 800 feet. A fire started in the area of the engine and the outboard reserve fuel tank exploded. The engine and 25 feet of the right outer wing later fell off. The fire was put out and the aircraft performed an emergency landing at Travis AFB with no casualties to the 153 on board. The cause of the engine failure was traced back to improper assembly, use of worn parts, and a design defect. The aircraft was repaired and returned to service.

=== 1970s ===
July 30, 1971
Flight 845, operated by Boeing 747-121 Clipper America, struck runway structures on takeoff from San Francisco International Airport due to pilot error; all 218 on board survived.

February 3, 1975
A passenger started a fire on board a Boeing 747 63 miles west of Rangoon; the fire was put out by the crew and all 77 on board survived.

December 27, 1979
Boeing 747-121SF N771PA suffered a partial separation of the number four engine and resultant fire while landing at Heathrow Airport; all three crew survived. The failure was caused by fatigue; the aircraft was repaired and returned to service.

=== 1980s ===
September 3, 1980
Flight 421, operated by Boeing 727-21 N327PA Clipper Meteor, crashed short of the runway at Juan Santamaria Airport in heavy rain; all 73 on board survived.

August 4, 1983

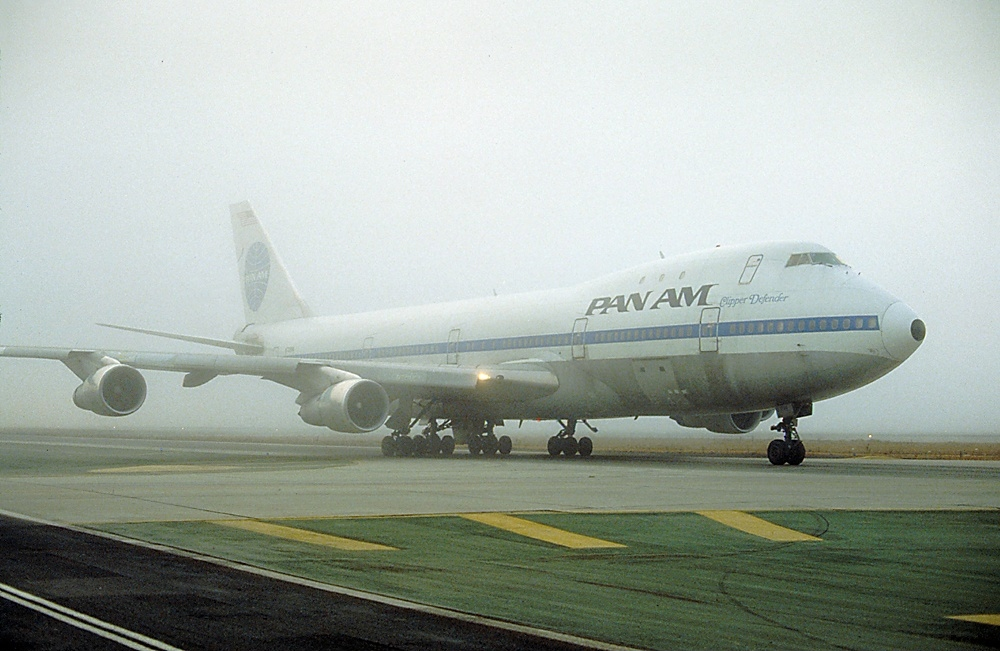
N738PA, the aircraft involved in the landing at Karachi

Flight 73, a Boeing 747-121 (N738PA), ran off the runway while landing at Karachi International Airport due to loss of control after the pilot selected forward thrust on engine number four by mistake; all 243 on board survived.

November 6, 1986
Flight 301, operated by Boeing 727-235 N4743 Clipper Good Hope, collided with a Piper Apache (N2185P) while taxiing at Tampa International Airport. The Apache crashed, killing the pilot while the 727 was evacuated with no casualties to the 23 on board. The aircraft was repaired and returned to service.

March 10, 1987
Flight 125, operated by a Boeing 747-122 N740PA Clipper Rival, suffered a pressurization problem while climbing through 20,000 feet. The flight was diverted back to London. When the plane was examined on the ground, the forward cargo door was found to be 1 1/2 inches opened.

== Hijackings ==
August 9, 1961
Flight 501, a Douglas DC-8, was hijacked to Cuba by one person.

February 9, 1968
A Douglas DC-6 was hijacked while parked at Da Nang Airport in Vietnam.

November 24, 1968
Flight 281, a Boeing 707, was hijacked to Cuba by four men.

April 13, 1969
Flight 460, a Boeing 727, was hijacked to Cuba by four men.

October 21, 1969
A Boeing 720B was diverted to Havana after a 17-year-old passenger drew a gun and demanded to be taken to Cuba. The hijacker had been denied a visa for Cuba in Mexico City.

June 22, 1970
Flight 119, a Boeing 707, was hijacked to Egypt by one person.

August 2, 1970
Flight 299, operated by Boeing 747-121 N736PA Clipper Victor, was hijacked to Cuba by a gun-wielding man who claimed that he had a bottle of nitroglycerin. This was the first hijacking of a Boeing 747. This aircraft would be lost in the crash of Flight 1736 in 1977.

August 3, 1970
Flight 742, a Boeing 727, was hijacked by a 28-year-old male passenger who demanded to go to Hungary. The aircraft continued to Berlin where the hijacker was arrested.

September 6, 1970
Flight 93 was hijacked by two men and diverted to Beirut where it was refueled and picked up several associates of the hijackers as well as enough explosives to blow up the plane. The aircraft then flew to Cairo, Egypt over uncertainty of the airport at Dawson's Field handling such a large aircraft as a 747. The passengers and crew were evacuated and seconds later the aircraft was blown up. This was the first loss of a Boeing 747.

May 29, 1971
Flight 442, a Boeing 707, was hijacked to Cuba by one person.

July 2, 1972
Flight 841, a Boeing 747, was hijacked over the South China Sea by 24-year-old Nguyen Thai Binh in protest of the US involvement in the Vietnam War as well has his expulsion from the US. The aircraft continued to Saigon where Binh was shot and killed by a retired police officer traveling as a passenger.

April 4, 1979
Flight 816, operated by Boeing 747SP-21 N530PA Clipper Mayflower, was hijacked while parked at Kingsford Smith Airport. The hijacker took a female hostage at the screening point inside the airport and forced himself on board while holding a knife to her throat. He demanded to be flown to Moscow via Singapore and Rome where he wanted interviews with the pope and an Italian communist leader. During negotiations the hostage was released. The hijacker then threatened to blow up the aircraft with a gunpowder-filled beer can with a wick sticking out of it. Police used a high-pressure hose to knock the hijacker off balance after which he hid behind a seat, still holding the beer can. The hijacker was shot and killed by police.

July 2, 1983
Flight 378, a Boeing 727, was hijacked by two men shortly after takeoff from Miami. One man approached a flight attendant with a plastic bottle containing a liquid with a gasoline smell and then went to the rear of the aircraft. A second man walked to the forward galley with an object that looked like a bomb; he spoke in Spanish that he had explosives and demanded to be taken to Cuba. The aircraft diverted to Havana where the hijackers were arrested by Cuban authorities.

August 2, 1983
Flight 935, a Boeing 727, was hijacked shortly after takeoff from Miami by a male passenger. He attempted to enter the cockpit and stated in Spanish that he was going to take control and fly to Cuba. A fellow passenger who understood Spanish told the hijacker that he could not take control and grabbed him. The passenger, assisted by his son and a second passenger, subdued the hijacker and tied him to a seat. The aircraft continued to Houston where the hijacker was arrested; he received a 20 year sentence for air piracy and 12 years for interfering a crew member.

January 4, 1985
A lone woman attempted to hijack Flight 558, a Boeing 727-235 (N4746) while parked at Cleveland-Hopkins International Airport. The hijacker proceeded through a security checkpoint as an unticketed passenger and pointed a gun at security guards when they confronted her. She then proceeded through the airport concourse and onto the aircraft and fired three shots at the aircraft door and hit a ticket agent who was escorting a mother and child. She fired and missed two police officers who were attempting to board the aircraft. Some passengers were able to escape but the hijacker held nine people hostage. She demanded to be taken to South America, possibly to Brazil. Following an hour of negotiations, four of the hostages were released. After five and a half hours, a SWAT team stormed the aircraft and shot and wounded the hijacker and the remaining hostages were released.

September 5, 1986
Flight 73, operated by Boeing 747-121 Clipper Empress of the Seas, was hijacked by four men, disguised as airport security guards, while parked at Karachi. The cockpit crew escaped through a cockpit hatch. The hijackers demanded the return of the pilots to fly to Cyprus to secure the release of Palestinian prisoners. The head hijacker, Safarini, grew impatient and shot a passenger and dumped him on the tarmac. Later into the night passengers were moved to the center of the plane, and the hijackers opened fire and threw grenades, killing 20. Most survivors escaped the plane when the shooting began. Pakistani special forces stormed the plane and arrested the hijackers. The Indian flight attendant Neerja Bhanot has been globally commended for her bravery in rescuing the passengers. The 2016 film Neerja is based on this incident.
