= Follow the Boys (1944 film) =

1944 film by A. Edward Sutherland

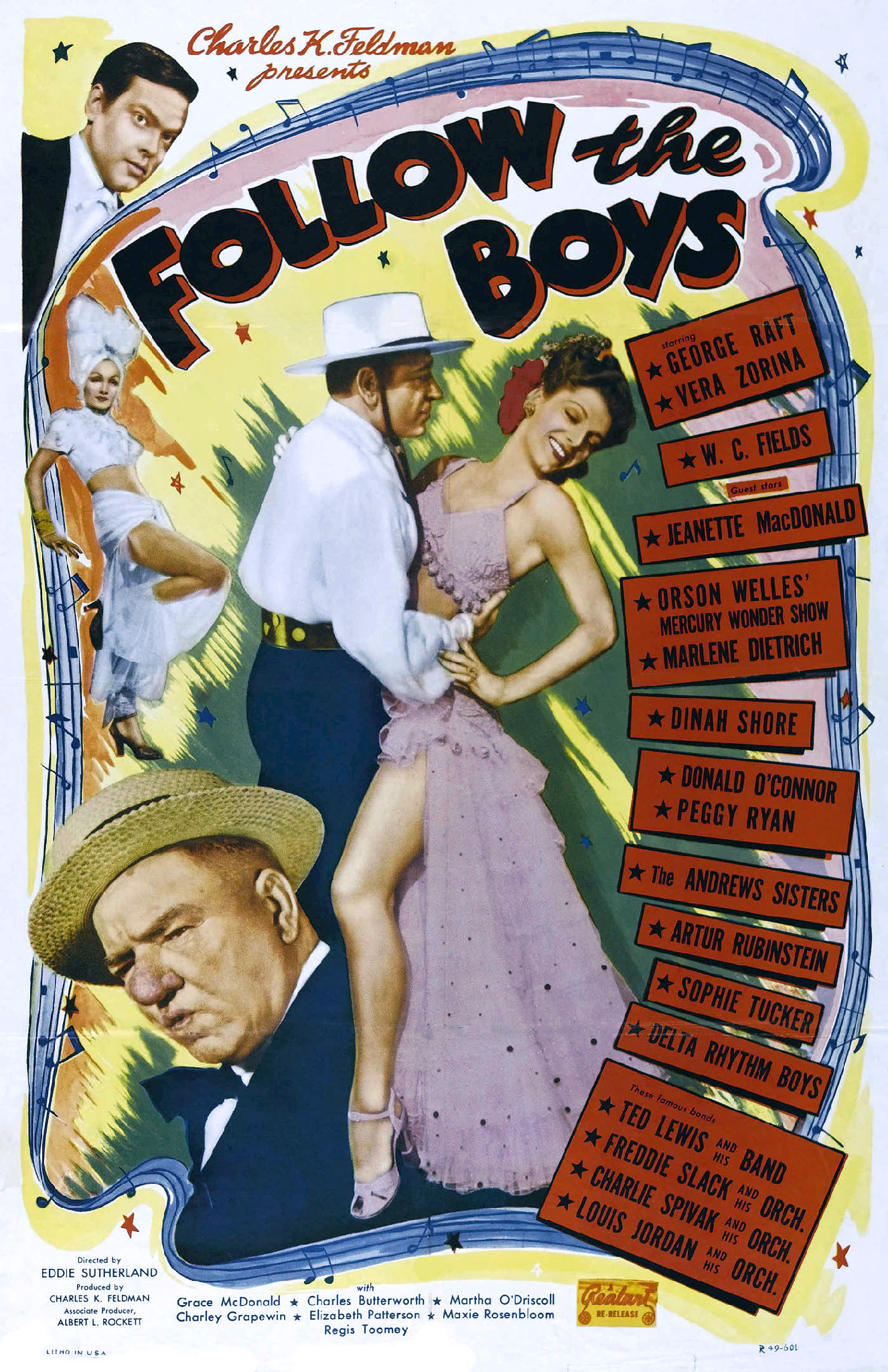
- Theatrical release poster
- Directed by: A. Edward Sutherland
- Written by: Lou Breslow; Gertrude Purcell
- Produced by: Charles K. Feldman
- Starring: George Raft; Vera Zorina
- Cinematography: David Abel
- Edited by: Fred R. Feitshans Jr.
- Music by: Fred E. Ahlert; Billy Austin; Dick Charles; Kermit Goell; Leigh Harline; Inez James; Louis Jordan; Larry Markes; Jimmy McHugh; Phil Moore; Buddy Pepper; Hughie Prince; Frank Skinner; Roy Turk; Oliver Wallace
- Production company: Chas. K. Feldman Group Productions
- Distributed by: Universal Pictures
- Release dates: April 25, 1944 (New York City); May 5, 1944 (United States)
- Running time: 122 minutes
- Country: United States
- Language: English
- Box office: $2 million

Follow the Boys also known as Three Cheers for the Boys is a 1944 musical film made by Universal Pictures during World War II as an all-star cast morale booster to entertain the troops abroad and the civilians at home. The film was directed by A. Edward "Eddie" Sutherland and produced by Charles K. Feldman. The movie stars George Raft and Vera Zorina and features Grace McDonald, Charles Grapewin, Regis Toomey and George Macready. At one point in the film, Orson Welles saws Marlene Dietrich in half during a magic show. W. C. Fields, in his first movie since 1941, performs a classic pool-playing presentation he first developed in vaudeville four decades earlier in 1903.

Making appearances are Walter Abel, Carmen Amaya, The Andrews Sisters, Evelyn Ankers, Louise Beavers, Noah Beery Jr., Turhan Bey, Steve Brodie, Nigel Bruce, Lon Chaney Jr., the Delta Rhythm Boys, Andy Devine, Marlene Dietrich, W. C. Fields, Susanna Foster, Thomas Gomez, Louis Jordan and His Orchestra, Ted Lewis and His Band, Jeanette MacDonald, Maria Montez, Clarence Muse, Donald O'Connor, Slapsie Maxie Rosenbloom, Arthur Rubinstein, Peggy Ryan, Randolph Scott, Dinah Shore, Freddie Slack and His Orchestra, Gale Sondergaard, Sophie Tucker, and Orson Welles, among many others.

== Plot ==
Tony West performs in vaudeville in a group with his father Nick and sister Kitty, The decline of vaudeville forces the group to split up and Tony goes to Hollywood to try to make it in movies. He works at Universal Pictures, where he becomes screen partners with, and then the husband of, star Gloria Vance.

When World War II breaks out, Tony tries to enlist but is refused because of his knee. Tony finds himself organising the Hollywood Victory Committee (H.V.C.), a consortium of motion picture, theatrical and radio personalities dedicated to help the war effort.

He puts on a show that includes performances from Donald O'Connor and Jeanette MacDonald.

Tony and Gloria have a big fight and she doesn't tell him that she is pregnant. Tony organizes another show, where Welles performs magic tricks including sawing Dietrich in half.

Tony goes overseas and is killed during an attack by a Japanese submarine. Gloria takes Tony's place entertaining the troops.

== Cast ==
- George Raft as Tony West
- Vera Zorina as Gloria Vance
- Charley Grapewin as Nick West
- Grace McDonald as Kitty
- Charles Butterworth as Louie West
- George Macready as Bruce
- Elizabeth Patterson as Annie
- Theodore von Eltz as Barrett
- Regis Toomey as Doctor Henderson
- Ramsay Ames as Laura
- W. C. Fields as himself
- Spooks as Junior
- And Molly Lamont, Doris Lloyd, Nelson Leigh, Lane Chandler, Cyril Ring, Emmett Vogan, Addison Richards, Stanley Andrews, Frank Jenks, Ralph Dunn, Billy Benedict, Howard C. Hickman, Edwin Stanley, Wallis Clark, Richard Crane, Frank Wilcox, Clyde Cook, Bobby Barber, Walter Tetley, Anthony Warde, William Forrest, Dennis Moore, Duke York, Carlyle Blackwell, Edwin Stanley, Charles King

== Production ==
The film was announced in June 1943. It was produced by Charles K. Feldman and was inspired by the success of Stage Door Canteen at Warner Bros. The original title was Three Cheers for the Boys. George Raft signed in July 1943. It was his first movie after leaving Warner Bros.

The cast featured several Universal contract stars, including Donald O'Connor and Peggy Ryan, as well as some actors who had just recently made films for Universal, such as Raft and Marlene Dietrich.

The film was shot at Naval Training Center San Diego.

The movie features a speech at the end about "soldiers in greasepaint", a tribute to those who entertained the troops during World War II. It features an "honor roll" which lists those entertainers who died in the war, including Carole Lombard, Leslie Howard, Roy Rognan, Tamara, Charles King and Bob Ripa.

== Reception ==
The New York Times called it a "sentimental tribute... cheap screen entertainment – and hardly a tribute to the players it presents." In Time in 1944, critic James Agee wrote, "Follow the Boys is a glorification of the service which cinemice and men are rendering the Armed Forces ... W. C. Fields, looking worn-and-torn but as noble as Stone Mountain, macerates a boozy song around his cigar butt and puts on his achingly funny pool exhibition with warped cues ... There are at least a dozen other acts, some of them all right. But they seem like three dozen, and the air gets so thick with self-congratulation that it is hard to see the patriotism."

== Songs and acts ==
- George Raft – several dance numbers
- Vera Zorina – dances to "A Better Day is Coming" and "I Feel a Song Coming On"
- George Raft and Zorina – dance to "Tonight"
- Delta Rhythm Boys – "The House I Live In"
- The Andrews Sisters – "Shoo Shoo Baby" and a medley of their hits including "Bei Mir Bist Du Schön", "Hold Tight, Hold Tight (Want Some Seafood, Mama)", "The Beer Barrel Polka", "The Boogie Woogie Bugle Boy of Company B", "I'll Be With You in Apple Blossom Time", "Pennsylvania Polka", "Victory Polka"
- Sophie Tucker – "The Bigger the Army and the Navy" and "Some of These Day"
- Donald O'Connor and Peggy Ryan – "Kittens With Their Mittens Laced"
- Jeanette MacDonald – "Beyond the Blue Horizon" and "I'll See You in My Dreams"
- Orson Welles – performs a few magic effects from The Mercury Wonder Show, ending with a trick-photography version of Marlene Dietrich being sawed in half
- Dinah Shore – "I'll Get By", "I'll Walk Alone", "Mad About Him Blues"
- Arthur Rubenstein – performs "Liebestraum No. 3 (A Dream of Love)"
- Louis Jordan – "Is You Is or Is You Ain't Ma' Baby", and "Sweet Georgia Brown", with Raft performing the charleston
- W. C. Fields – performs a comedy routine involving a billiard table
- Carmen Amaya – "Merriment"
- the Delta Rhythm Boys
- Gautier's performing dogs
- Charlie Spivak and his Orchestra – "Swing Low, Sweet Chariot " and "Besame Mucho"
- Ted Lewis – "Good Night"

== Accolades ==
The film is recognized by American Film Institute in these lists:

- 2004: AFI's 100 Years...100 Songs:
  - "I'll Walk Alone" – Nominated

== Home media ==
- 1994: MCA Home Video, VHS (80594), ISBN 0-7832-1096-5, 1994
- 2008: Universal Pictures UK, DVD (825 816 2), region PAL, 2008 [running time 106 minutes] <reference from DVD package>

== See also ==
- List of American films of 1944
