= Pan Am Flight 73 =

1986 ground hijacking in Pakistan

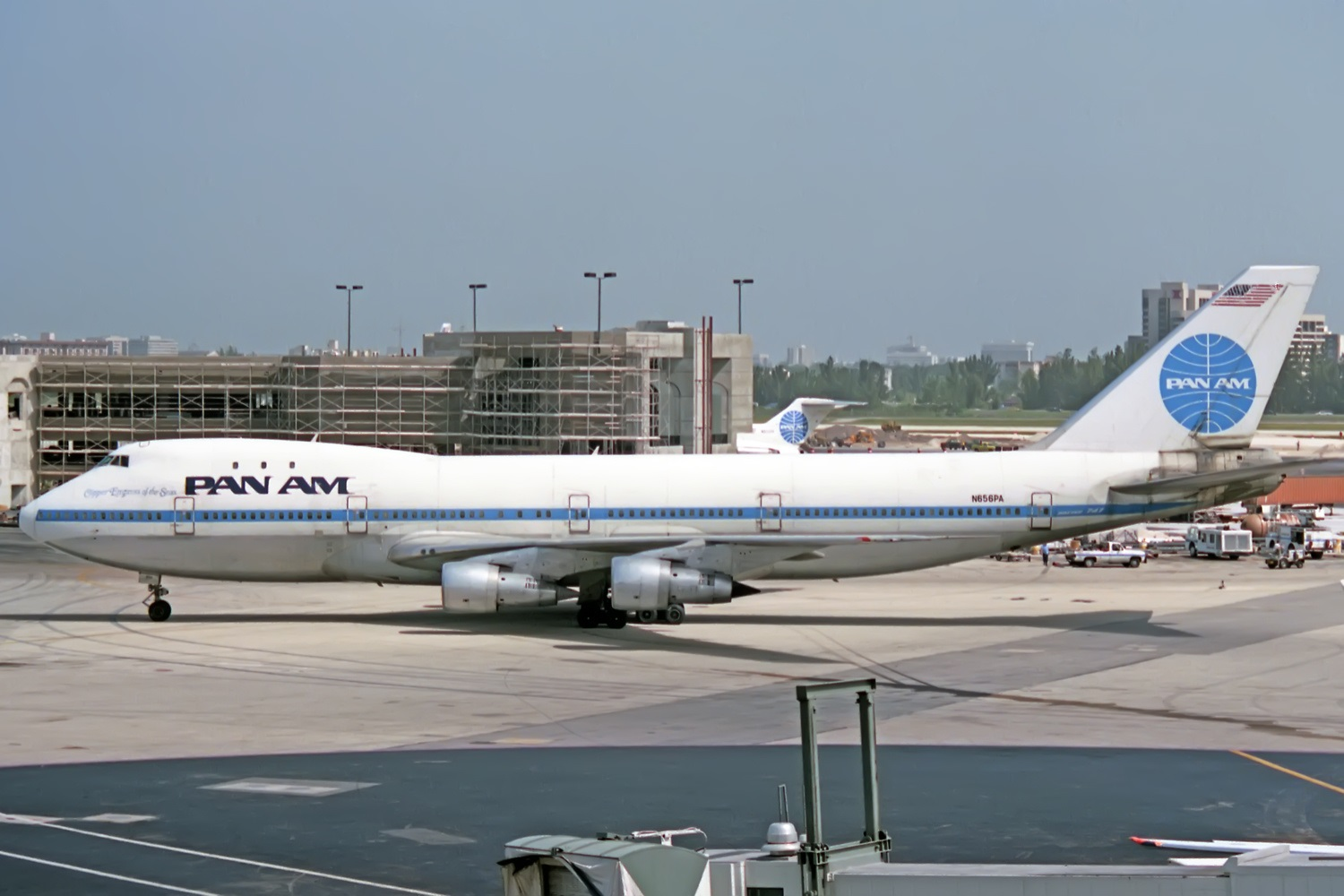
- N656PA, the aircraft involved in the hijacking, in May 1983

Hijacking
- Date: 5 September 1986
- Summary: Hijacking
- Site: Karachi Airport, Karachi, Sindh, Pakistan; 24°54′24″N 67°09′39″E

Aircraft
- Aircraft type: Boeing 747-121
- Aircraft name: Clipper Empress of the Seas
- Operator: Pan American World Airways
- IATA flight No.: PA73
- ICAO flight No.: PAA73
- Call sign: CLIPPER 73
- Registration: N656PA
- Flight origin: Sahar Airport, Bombay, India
- Stopover: Karachi Airport, Karachi, Pakistan
- Last stopover: Frankfurt Airport, Frankfurt, West Germany
- Destination: John F. Kennedy International Airport, New York City, United States
- Occupants: 379
- Passengers: 360
- Crew: 19
- Fatalities: 20-22 (Note: According to Pan Am, there were 379 people on board including 19 crew members. Pan Am lists the names of the 20 people who were killed, including mechanic Meherjee Kharas, who was not a member of the cabin crew but was trapped inside the aircraft during the hijacking while conducting routine maintenance checks. Records from the U.S. Department of Justice, held in the Federal Bureau of Investigation archives, list the death toll as 21. However, other sources such as the BBC and Britannica, report the death toll as 22.)
- Injuries: 150
- Survivors: 357-359

Pan Am Flight 73 was a scheduled passenger flight operated by Pan American World Airways from Bombay to New York City via Karachi and Frankfurt. On 5 September 1986, the Boeing 747-100 serving the flight, with 379 passengers and crew on board, was hijacked while on the ground at Karachi by four armed Palestinian militants affiliated with the Abu Nidal Organization. The cockpit crew escaped from the aircraft through an overhead hatch after being alerted to the situation by the flight attendants. Without the cockpit crew, the aircraft was grounded, foiling the hijackers' plan to fly the aircraft to Cyprus, where other members of their militant group were imprisoned.

While the hijackers demanded that the pilots be sent back to operate the aircraft, they shot an Indian-American passenger. They tried to identify other American passengers, their primary targets, by examining the passengers' passports. The cabin crew concealed the passports under the seats and in the trash chute, preventing the hijackers from identifying the American passengers. After a 17-hour standoff, the cabin lights went out due to a loss of power after the Auxiliary power unit failed and the back up battery ran out. The hijackers threw grenades and opened fire using automatic rifles inside the darkened cabin. The passengers and the crew tried to escape through the two exit doors that had been opened. The Pakistan Armed Forces entered the aircraft soon afterward. The hijack and the assault resulted in the deaths of at least 20 people, including the head purser Neerja Bhanot and Pan Am mechanic Meherjee Kharas.

According to US government officials, the hijacking was orchestrated by Libya in response to the 1986 United States bombing of Libya. Five people including the four hijackers were arrested and sentenced to death in July 1988 after a Pakistani trial; their sentences were later commuted to life imprisonment. Zayd Safarini, the leader of the hijackers, was released from jail in Pakistan after 15 years and extradited to the United States where he was sentenced to a 160-year prison term in May 2005. The other four hijackers were released and deported to Palestine in 2008, despite objections from India and the United States. The four released hijackers are part of the Federal Bureau of Investigation's Most Wanted Terrorists list with a cash reward offered in 2009 to those who provide information on the whereabouts of the men.

In the aftermath, Bhanot was posthumously awarded the Ashoka Chakra, India's highest peacetime gallantry award and the Tamgha-e-Insaniyat, Pakistan's fourth-highest civilian award, among other awards. In 2006, the United States Department of Justice awarded the "Special Courage Award" to the cabin crew of the flight. The incident is portrayed in the 2016 Hindi-language film Neerja, based on Bhanot's life, and in Hijacked: Flight 73, a 2023 documentary.

== Background ==
=== Aircraft ===
Pan Am Flight 73 was a scheduled passenger flight operated by Pan American World Airways from Bombay to New York City via Karachi and Frankfurt. On 5 September 1986, the service was operated by a Boeing 747-121, registered N656PA, which was delivered to Pan American World Airways on 18 June 1971. It was earlier named as Clipper Live Yankee by the airline, and was known as Clipper Empress of the Seas during the incident.

=== Passengers and crew ===
When the aircraft flew from Bombay to Karachi, there were 394 passengers on board including nine infants. These included 207 Indians, 85 Pakistanis, 44 US citizens and 58 people of other nationalities, mostly from Europe. At Karachi, 109 people disembarked from the flight and a few others boarded the aircraft. At the time of the hijacking, there were 379 passengers and crew members on board the flight, in addition to Pan Am mechanic Meherjee Kharas, who was not a member of the cabin crew but was trapped inside the aircraft during the hijacking while conducting routine maintenance checks.

The cockpit consisted of an all-American crew composed of captain William Kianka, first officer Conway Dodge Sr. and flight engineer John Ridgeway. There was a 13 member all-Indian cabin crew headed by senior purser Neerja Bhanot, comprising purser Lillian Netto and 11 flight attendants. There were also three other flight attendants who were pass-riding. Among the passengers were 193 Indians, and 75 Americans.

=== Hijackers ===
There were four hijackers led by Zayd Hassan Abd al-Latif Safarini, and including Jamal Saeed Abdul Rahim, Muhammad Abdullah Khalil Hussain ar-Rahayyal, and Muhammad Ahmed Al-Munawar, who were affiliated with the Abu Nidal Organization. While Safarini was a Jordanian citizen, Rahim and Hussain were from Lebanon, and Al-Munawar was from Kuwait.

== Hijacking ==
=== Hijacking and takeover ===
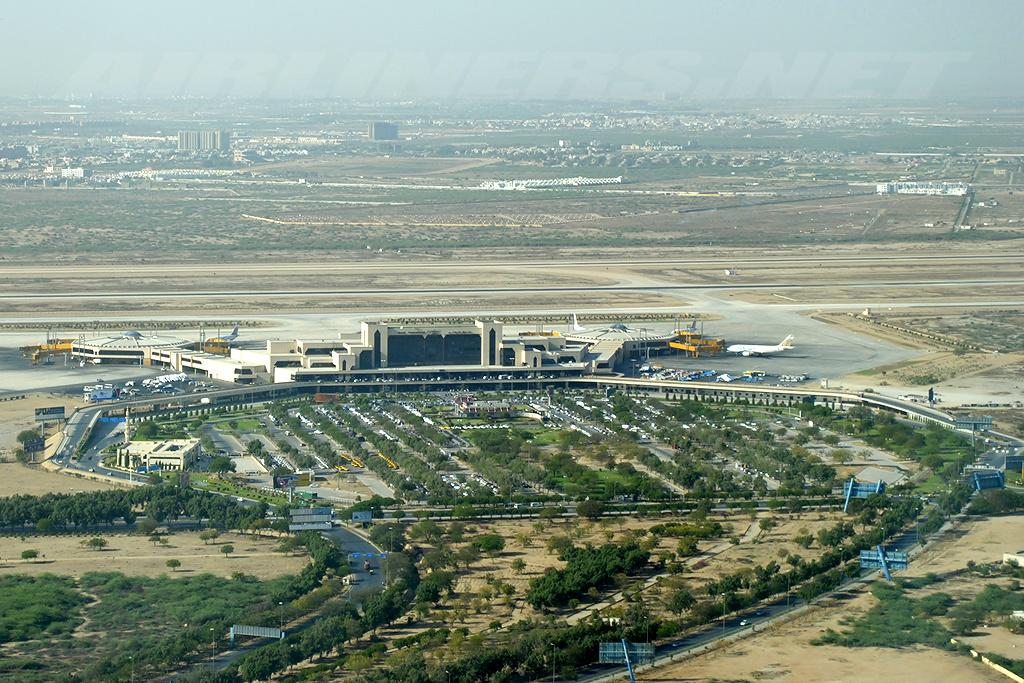
Aerial view of the Karachi airport, where the hijacking took place

Pan Am Flight 73 originated in Bombay and landed at the Karachi airport for a scheduled stopover at 5:25 a.m. A few passengers disembarked at Karachi and a new busload of fresh passengers from Karachi began boarding the aircraft. The four hijackers had earlier driven a vehicle that had been modified to resemble an airport security van and passed through the airport security point. At around 6 a.m., the vehicle approached the stairways used for boarding passengers for Pan Am Flight 73. Two armed men, dressed in airport security uniforms, quickly climbed up the stairs. There was also gunfire outside the aircraft reported around this time, which injured two Kuwait Airways ground staff working on an aircraft nearby. Soon, two other men joined them, one of them dressed in a salwar kameez and carrying a suitcase. They shot at the foot of Bhanot, who was at the door, forcing her to close to the door. The hijackers were armed with several handguns, assault rifles, grenades, and wore plastic explosive belts. While they took control of the aircraft, the cabin crew alerted the pilots in the cockpit by intercom. (Note: Sources vary on who alerted the cockpit crew. As per India Today, head purser Neerja Bhanot alerted the cockpit crew. However, according to BBC, Bhanot had a gun pointed at her head at that time and flight attendant Sherene Pavan alerted the cockpit. Pan Am and United States Department of Justice mention that one of the cabin crew members alerted the pilots without explicitly identifying who it was.) The cockpit crew subsequently exited the aircraft through the overhead emergency hatch, via the Inertial Reel Escape Device. (Note: In a Boeing 747, the escape hatch in the cockpit is equipped with the Inertial Reel Escape Device, which consists of three metal cables attached to the roof of the cockpit, which can be used to descend to the ground.) The escape of the pilots immobilized the aircraft.

=== Demand for the pilots ===
After seizing control of the aircraft, one of the hijackers asked flight attendant Sunshine Vesuwala to lead him to the cockpit. When the hijackers discovered that the cockpit crew had escaped, they were forced to negotiate with officials. The window blinds were pulled down, and the first- and business-class passengers were moved to the economy section with their hands behind their heads. Viraf Daroga, Pan Am's Country Director for Pakistan, used a megaphone to try to negotiate with the hijackers. Safarini demanded that the pilots return to the aircraft. He later revealed that the hijackers intended to fly the aircraft to Larnaca, Cyprus, to negotiate the release of Palestinian prisoners held in the country's prisons. Daroga told the hijackers that they were searching for pilots to fly the aircraft.

As the negotiations dragged on, Safarini ordered Rajesh Kumar, a 29-year-old resident of California who had recently been naturalized as an American citizen, to kneel at the front doorway of the aircraft with his hands behind his head. Safarini warned Daroga that he would kill Kumar unless a cockpit crew was sent to the aircraft. As Safarini grew impatient because his demands were not being met, he shot Kumar in the head at approximately 10:00 a.m. and pushed him out of the door. According to Pakistani authorities, Kumar was still alive and was taken to a hospital by ambulance, where he later succumbed to his injuries.

Safarini ordered flight attendants Bhanot, Vesuwala, and Madhvi Bahuguna to collect the passengers' passports. The hijackers then went through the collected passports in an attempt to identify US citizens. However, believing that passengers carrying United States passports would be singled out by the hijackers, the flight attendants hid some of the passports under the seats and discarded the rest in a trash bin. Unable to find any American passports, Safarini went through the cabin asking passengers about their nationalities.

=== Standoff ===
Mechanic Kharas, who was stuck aboard the plane, was forced by the hijackers to use the cockpit radio to communicate with the negotiators. Safarini then called Michael Thexton, a British citizen, who was forced to kneel on the floor at the front of the plane. Thexton was returning home to England after visiting Broad Peak, where his brother had died of altitude sickness in 1983. He remained in that position for nearly 12 hours, while the hijackers negotiated with the authorities. Eventually, the hijackers allowed the crew to serve food to the passengers. Safarini continued to negotiate for a cockpit crew and set a deadline of 7 p.m. He used flight attendants Veswala and Sherene Pavan as human shields, while repeatedly surveying the area outside from the upper deck of the aircraft.

Daroga negotiated a new deadline of 11 p.m. and asked for help from Pan Am headquarters in New York. Pan Am pilots Hart Langer, Ed Cywinski, along with engineer Bob Huetti volunteered to fly the aircraft to Cyprus if the passengers were not harmed by the hijackers. They then boarded a Swissair flight from Zurich to Karachi. As the engines were not running, the aircraft was powered by the Auxiliary power unit (APU). However, the APU had a mechanical issue and failed at 9:55 p.m. The battery-powered emergency lights then came on, causing the cabin lights to flicker.

=== Shooting and escape ===
Safarini learnt from Kharas that the battery power would not last long. Kharas was shot in the cockpit when the aircraft was about to lose power. Anticipating the lights to go off, Safarini commanded the passengers to the center of the aircraft and the hijackers positioned themselves on the sides of the aisles. At around 10 p.m., the power went off and the aircraft became dark. The hijackers recited a prayer and began shooting indiscriminately with their automatic rifles while tossing hand grenades. The cabin crew and the passengers managed to open at least two of the doors (R3 and R4) on the right side of the aircraft. The emergency slide deployed on R4, but it did not deploy on the over wing exit R3.

The passengers rushed to escape the aircraft with many of them forced to jump blindly onto the wing and tarmac below in the darkness. The cabin crew helped guide the passengers to safety. Pakistan Armed Forces entered the aircraft after hearing the shooting. When the gunfire had stopped, some of the crew went back inside the aircraft to look for survivors. They found that Bhanot had been shot by the hijackers, and was bleeding profusely. Veswala and another flight attendant, Dilip Bidichandani, carried Bhanot to the emergency exit and pushed her down the slide. She was helped by other crew members onto an ambulance.

== Victims ==
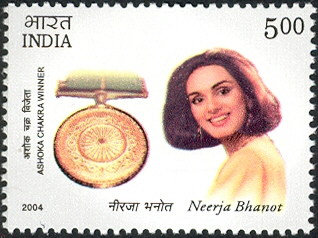
Head purser Neerja Bhanot, who was killed during the hijack, on a 2004 Indian postage stamp

At least 20 people were killed and 150 more were injured in the incident. The dead included Pan Am employees Bhanot and Kharas, and at least 18 other civilians including 14 Indian citizens, and two US and Mexican citizens each. The injured were taken to hospitals in Karachi. According to other crew members, Bhanot was alive when she was put in an ambulance and taken to the Jinnah Hospital, where she later succumbed to her injuries. Eyewitness accounts later recalled that the airport had limited medical facilities, and the hospital was located far away, which might have led to more casualties.

The seriously injured were airlifted aboard a Lockheed C-141 Starlifter of the United States Air Force to Frankfurt. The US citizens were treated at military facilities at Landstuhl and Wiesbaden, while others were admitted to civilian hospitals in Frankfurt. Two 747s were operated by Pan Am to ferry the remaining passengers to Frankfurt, while a few chose to travel back to Bombay.

The damaged aircraft was repaired and was flown to Frankfurt five days later by the relief crew of captains Langer and Cywinski, along with Engineer Huetti. The aircraft was eventually repaired and returned to scheduled service. After a short break, the remaining surviving flight crew returned to work.

== Aftermath and response ==
=== Conflicting accounts and criticism ===
The evacuation of the cockpit crew, which left the passengers in the care of a 23-year-old flight purser and an inexperienced cabin crew, became a subject of debate among aviation experts and commentators. Pan Am defended their actions and stated that the evacuation was in accordance with its standard operating procedures. The absence of the flight crew also prevented the aircraft from being operated, potentially allowing more time for negotiations. The position was echoed by the cabin crew who were in the aircraft.

There were several inconsistencies regarding the Pakistan government's response to the hijacking. Initial Pakistani statements claimed that army commandos had stormed the aircraft almost immediately after the shooting began, but different people gave various accounts. Brigadier Tariq Mahmud, head of security, said two minutes, Jahandad Khan, the Governor of Sindh, said six to seven minutes, while Air Marshal Khurshid Anwar Mirza gave varying accounts, including almost immediately, three minutes, and 15 minutes. Various accounts placed their arrival between three and 15 minutes later. Passengers said that the commandos did not enter the aircraft until after the shooting started, and by the time the commandos reached the plane, many passengers had already started escaping, assisted by the cabin crew.

Initially, the Pakistani authorities, stated in the first press briefing on the night of the hijacking that they knew that the lights inside the aircraft would go off at around 9:30 p.m. and that the tarmac lights were switched off to facilitate the rescue by the commandos. However, in the next briefing, which took place the following morning, the authorities denied having made the earlier statements. A Pan Am official said that the company had warned the Pakistani authorities well in advance that the aircraft's APU was likely to fail, but the warning was not acted upon. The conflicting official accounts from the Pakistani authorities also claimed that commandos had killed two hijackers. Authorities later said that one body, which was initially identified as a hijacker, was actually that of the Pan Am employee Mehras, while wounded hijacker Safarini had initially been mistaken for dead.

A Los Angeles Times report said that as many as seven senior Pakistani officials, including military and police commanders, elected leaders, the director of civil aviation, and the provincial governor, were involved in making decisions during the hijacking. The overlapping chains of command reportedly caused communication failures and delayed the army's response. The report also cited Pakistan's unreliable telephone system as another factor hampering communication and decision-making during the crisis. As per Time, the Pakistani authorities attempted to conceal a poorly executed commando operation. It opined that the authorities might have decided to proceed with the operation rather than allowing the aircraft to take off.

=== Arrest and investigation ===
While Safarani was apparently injured and was still on the aircraft when the Pakistani forces arrived, the other three hijackers tried to escape along with the fleeing passengers. They were later identified by the passengers, and were arrested by the Pakistani authorities. Safarini was moved to a hospital and the other three captured hijackers were moved to a Pakistan military base. A week later, the Pakistani authorities arrested another accomplice, Wadoud Muhammad Hafiz al-Turki, who arranged the security uniforms the hijackers were wearing.

Investigation revealed that all the hijackers were traveling on forged Bahraini passports and had arrived in Pakistan about 18 days prior to the hijacking. However, as no further arrests were made, it was not clear who housed the hijackers, supplied the weapons, and drove them to the airport. Based on half-eaten food found at a location in the airport, Pakistani authorities said that the hijackers probably traveled to the airport a few hours before the aircraft landed and parked in a secluded area in the darkness. They were reportedly let in through a cargo gate by a security guard. Further investigation revealed that the hijackers fired for less than a minute, however the bullets ricocheting in the enclosed space, resulted in more fatalities and injuries.

=== Responsibility and compensation ===
The hijackers had stated their intention to fly to Cyprus to negotiate the release of three of their colleagues held in prison. The three were apparently associated with the Palestine Liberation Organization (PLO) and were serving life sentences for the murder of three Israeli citizens at Larnaca. The authorities suspected that either the PLO or the Abu Nidal organization, known to be sympathetic to the Palestinian cause, and responsible for several terrorist incidents in the last few months, was responsible for the hijacking. Meanwhile, an anonymous phone call to a news agency in Nicosia claimed that the Libyan Revolutionary Cells, a previously unknown group, was responsible for the hijacking. Another unknown group, Jundallah (Soldiers of God), also claimed responsibility for the attack. However, the Libyan government, led by Muammar Gaddafi, denied any role in the hijacking.

The hijackers were later identified as members of the Abu Nidal Organization. While Libya later accepted responsibility for the bombings of Pan Am Flight 103 in 1988 and UTA Flight 772 in 1989, it did not accept responsibility for the hijacking of Pan Am Flight 73. However, US government officials believed that Libya was behind the hijacking and had tasked the Abu Nidal Organization with carrying it out in retaliation for the 1986 United States bombing of Libya.

In 2006, the law firm, Crowell & Moring, filed a civil lawsuit on behalf of the families of the victims and the survivors of the hijack asking for compensation from Libya. However, after negotiations between the US and Libyan governments, Libya agreed to settle the claims arising from terrorist attacks in return for the restoration of the diplomatic relations between the countries. As per the agreement, the survivors were entitled to receive up to US$ 330 million. Despite the settlement between the two governments, Crowell & Moring claimed a major share of the compensation, which led to the survivors suing the law firm in court. However, the funds that Libya gave the US to settle claims related to Libyan sponsored terrorism globally were not distributed to non US citizens who were victims of the hijacking. According to Government of India, the US government has indicated that the compensation applied only for US citizens as per the terms of the agreement with Libya and established international conventions.

=== Trial, sentencing, and imprisonment ===
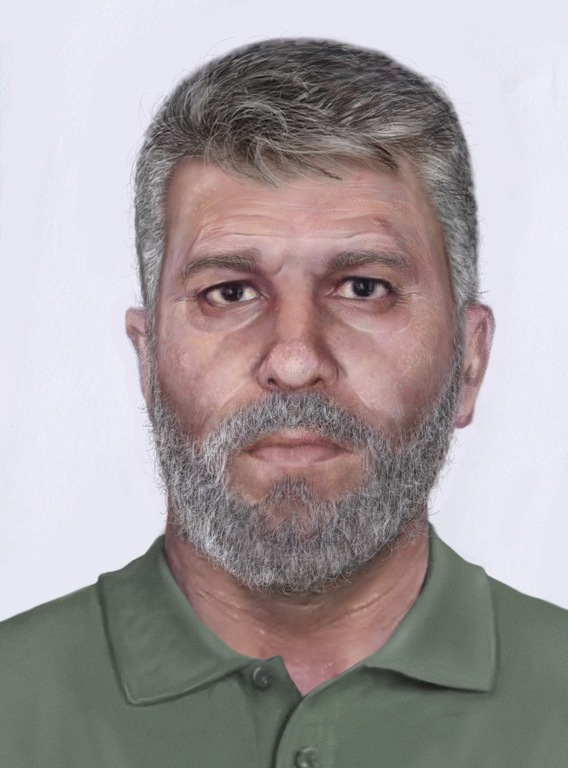
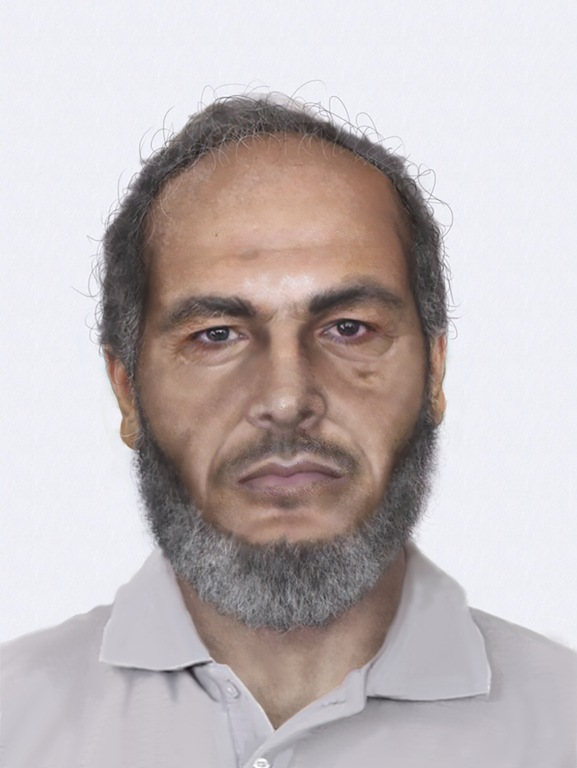
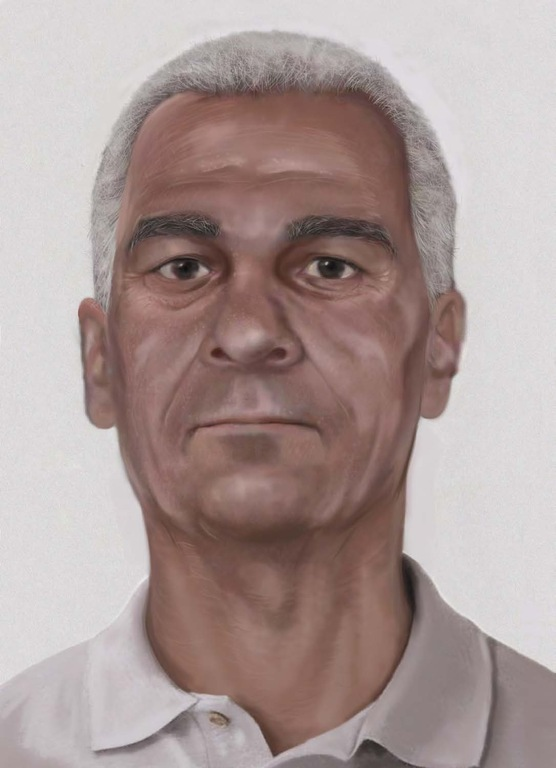
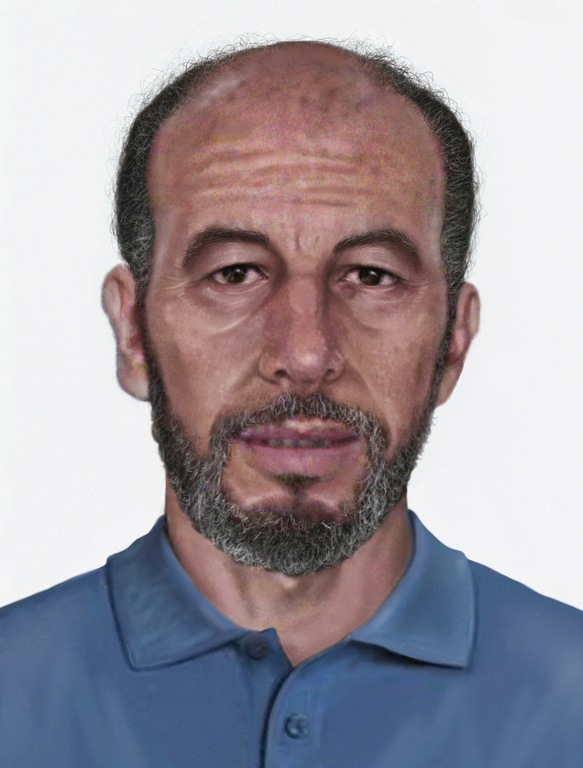
Age-progressed mugshots of the four hijackers released by the FBI in 2018

On 6 July 1988, a special tribunal appointed to try the case convicted the five hijackers and sentenced them to death; their sentences were later commuted to terms of imprisonment.

On 29 August 1991, an indictment was returned under seal by a grand jury in the United States District Court for the District of Columbia. On 19 June 2000, at the government's request, the indictment was unsealed by the federal court in the District of Columbia.

In 2000, the Pakistani government announced its intention to release the hijackers following the end of their prison sentence. Safarini was released after serving 15 years in prison, was immediately arrested by US law enforcement authorities on 28 September 2001 and extradited to the US. Safarini and the four other hijackers were indicted on 28 August 2002. On 16 December 2003, Safarini agreed to a plea deal offered by the United States Department of Justice and was sentenced to 160 years in prison on 13 May 2005. He has since been incarcerated at a federal prison.

=== Release and subsequent manhunt ===
The other four hijackers were released from Pakistani prisons in January 2008. They were supposedly deported by the Pakistani authorities and handed over to the Palestinian Authority despite the objections of the Indian and US governments. Their whereabouts were unknown and on 3 December 2009, the Federal Bureau of Investigation (FBI), in coordination with the United States State Department, announced a US$5 million reward for information that leads to the capture of the four hijackers.

One of the four, Rahim, was allegedly killed in a drone strike in Pakistan on 9 January 2010. However, his death was never confirmed and he remains on the FBI's Most Wanted Terrorists list and the State Department's Rewards for Justice list. In hopes of generating new leads that might help capture the hijackers, the FBI released new age-progressed images of the hijackers on 11 January 2018.

== Awards and recognition ==
The cabin crew and Daroga were honoured with courage awards by Pan Am in 1986. In 2006, the United States Department of Justice awarded the "Special Courage Award" to the cabin crew.

Bhanot was posthumously awarded the Ashoka Chakra, India's highest peacetime gallantry award and the Tamgha-e-Insaniyat, Pakistan's fourth-highest civilian award. She also received several other awards including the Flight Safety Foundation Heroism Award for 1987, the Medal of Heroism from the National Society of the Sons of the American Revolution, the "Justice for Crimes Award" by the United States Attorney for the District of Columbia, honorary award by the Indian Ministry of Civil Aviation in 2011, and the "Bharat Gaurav Award" in 2016 by the House of Commons of British Parliament. In 2004, India Post released a commemorative stamp in her honour. The annual Neerja Bhanot Award, instituted by her parents, is awarded to Indian woman who overcomes social injustice to help other women in distress.

== In popular culture ==
- Neerja (2016) is an Indian Hindi-language biographical film based on Bhanot and the incident.
- Hijacked: Flight 73 (2013) is a documentary about the hijacking.

== See also ==
- List of Pan American World Airways accidents and incidents
- United Airlines Flight 93 – Hijacked 9/11 flight; passengers fought back
- Flydubai Flight 1073 – 2026 cockpit attack and attempted hijacking attempted by copilot to crash plane flying to Israel foiled by captain and passengers storming cockpit
