= Get Out of Town =

1938 song by Cole Porter

Song
- Published: 1938 by Chappell & Co.
- Songwriter: Cole Porter

"Get Out of Town" is a 1938 popular song written by Cole Porter, for his musical Leave It to Me!, where it was introduced by Tamara Drasin.

== Notable recordings ==
- Ginny Simms – recorded December 7, 1938, for Vocalion Records (catalog No. 4549).
- Frances Langford – recorded December 14, 1938, for Decca Records (catalog No. 2229A).
- Eddy Duchin and His Orchestra (vocal by Stanley Worth) – a popular record in 1939.
- Artie Shaw and His Orchestra (vocal by Mel Torme) – recorded on June 25, 1946, for Musicraft Records (catalog No. 389).
- Mel Torme – on his Gene Norman Presents Mel Torme At The Crescendo (1955)
- Chris Connor – included on her album Chris Connor (1956)
- Lena Horne – for her album Give the Lady What She Wants (1958)
- Anita O'Day – included on her album Anita O'Day Swings Cole Porter with Billy May (1959)
- Maysa Matarazzo – recorded in 1959 for RGE – 45 rpm (No. 90.000).
- Gerry Mulligan – Jeru (1962)
- Julie London – All Through the Night: Julie London Sings the Choicest of Cole Porter (1965)
- Rosemary Clooney – Rosemary Clooney Sings the Music of Cole Porter (1982)
- Steve Rochinski – A Bird In The Hand (1999)
- Dena DeRose – Live at Jazz Standard, Volume 1 (2007)
- Melody Gardot – Bye Bye Blackbird EP (2009)
