= SS Ben Robertson =

World War II Liberty ship of the United States

History

United States
- Name: Ben Robertson
- Namesake: Ben Robertson
- Operator: A. H. Bull Steamship Company
- Builder: Southeastern Shipbuilding Corporation, Savannah, Georgia
- Yard number: 2432
- Laid down: 18 November 1943
- Launched: 4 January 1944
- Sponsored by: Mrs. Julian Longley, Robertson's sister
- Completed: 21 January 1944
- Acquired: 18-Nov-43
- Renamed: Kastor
- Fate: Scrapped, December 1968

General characteristics
- Class & type: Type EC2-S-C1 Liberty ship
- Displacement: 14,245 long tons (14,474 t)
- Length: 441 ft 6 in (134.57 m) o/a; 417 ft 9 in (127.33 m) p/p; 427 ft (130 m) w/l
- Beam: 57 ft (17 m)
- Draft: 27 ft 9 in (8.46 m)
- Propulsion: Two oil-fired boilers; Triple-expansion steam engine; 2,500 hp (1,900 kW); Single screw
- Speed: 11 knots (20 km/h; 13 mph)
- Range: 20,000 nmi (37,000 km; 23,000 mi)
- Capacity: 10,856 t (10,685 long tons) deadweight (DWT)
- Crew: 81
- Armament: Stern-mounted 4 in (100 mm) deck gun for use against surfaced submarines, variety of anti-aircraft guns

SS Ben Robertson was a Liberty ship, Maritime Commission hull number 2432, built during World War II and named for Clemson University alumnus (Class of 1923), journalist, and war correspondent Benjamin F. Robertson, who was killed in the crash of a Pan Am Boeing 314 flying boat, the Yankee Clipper, in the Tagus River, near Lisbon, Portugal, on 22 February 1943.

Ben Robertson was constructed at the yards of the Southeastern Shipbuilding Corporation, Savannah, Georgia, one of 88 Liberty ships the yard built. Laid down on 18 November 1943, it was launched on 4 January 1944. Mrs. Julian Longley, Robertson's sister, of Dalton, Georgia, was sponsor for the new ship, part of a nationwide maritime program of naming Liberty ships for war correspondents killed in action. The new vessel was delivered on 21 January 1944, having spent 47 days on the ways and 17 in the water for a total of 64 days building.

Under the auspices of the War Shipping Administration, the Ben Robertson was operated under contract by the A. H. Bull Steamship Company, of New York City, through the end of the war.

More than 2,400 Liberty ships survived the war, only 196 having been lost in combat. Of these, 835 made up the postwar cargo fleet. Greek entrepreneurs bought 526 ships and Italian ones bought 98. The Ben Robertson was sold to a private firm in 1947, one of five Liberty ships acquired by Constantine G. Gratsos, one of the brothers of the George D. Gratsos Shipping Company of Athens, whose roots date to 1902, and was reflagged for Greece. The ship was renamed Kastor, and homeported at Ithaca, with Dracoulis, Ltd., of London acting as agent. Title changed slightly to George D. Gratsos, Athens, in 1949, and to Gratsos Bros., Athens, in 1963, the peak year for Liberty ship ownership when the Cuban blockade encouraged high freight rates. "The decline of the Liberties that started in 1964 was completed by 1974. In 1966 there were still 722 Liberties operating on world trade routes, of which 603 were Greek-owned." The ship was scrapped at Hirao, Japan, in December 1968.
