= Ben Robertson (journalist) =

American journalist

- Born: 22 June 1903; Calhoun, now Clemson, South Carolina, US
- Died: 22 February 1943 (aged 39); Lisbon, Portugal
- Resting place: West View Cemetery, also known as Liberty Cemetery, Liberty, South Carolina
- Education: Clemson University, 1923, horticulture
- Occupations: Journalist, author, war correspondent
- Employers: Associated Press; United Press; New York Herald Tribune

Benjamin Franklin Robertson Jr. (June 22, 1903 – February 22, 1943) was an American writer, journalist and World War II war correspondent. He is best known for his renowned Southern memoir Red Hills and Cotton: An Upcountry Memory, first published in 1942 and still in print. A native of Clemson, South Carolina, a horticulture graduate of Clemson Agricultural College of South Carolina, class of 1923, and writer for The Tiger, the college student newspaper. He was an honorary member of Gamma Alpha Mu local writers fraternity. He died in 1943 in a plane crash in Portugal. The SS Ben Robertson, launched in Savannah, Georgia, in 1944, was named for him.

== Early life and education ==
Ben Robertson was born June 22, 1903, in Calhoun, which became Clemson, South Carolina, in 1943. He was the son of Mary (née Bowen) Robertson and Benjamin Franklin Robertson. His father was the South Carolina state chemist and had his offices in Calhoun at Clemson Agricultural College, now Clemson University. Ben attended Clemson where he wrote for the college newspaper, was a first lieutenant in the corps of cadets, editor-in-chief of the year book his senior year and graduated in 1923 with a degree in horticulture. He then went to the University of Missouri where he received a degree in journalism in 1926.

== Career ==
Robertson's professional career in journalism began with a short stint at the News and Courier in Charleston. His first major job after graduating was at the Honolulu Star-Bulletin. In 1927 he went to Australia to work for The News in Adelaide. From 1929 to 1934 he reported for the New York Herald Tribune, after which he went to work for the Associated Press in New York and London. In 1935 he went to the United Press and also sent stories to the Anderson Independent in South Carolina. In 1937 Ben Robertson returned to AP and also did disaster relief work for the American Red Cross during the Ohio River flood of 1937. He even shipped out for a time on the MS City of Rayville.

In 1938, Robertson served as a political columnist for the short-lived Clemson Commentator, a semi-weekly that first published on June 6, and ceased printing on July 22, 1938.

In 1938 pioneering musicologist and folklorist John Lomax visited Robertson in South Carolina and Robertson introduced him to the all-day singing festivals of the area which enabled Lomax to preserve the lyrics of many local folksongs.

His work as a war correspondent began in 1940 covering England for the New York paper PM. He worked with Edward R. Murrow covering The Blitz of London. While reporting on the Blitz, Robertson also traveled to Northern Ireland and Dublin. During 1942 he roved for PM and the Chicago Sun in the Pacific, Asia and North Africa.

In January 1943, Robertson joined Wendell Willkie and Eleanor Roosevelt in a series of talks in three large Canadian cities, urging a campaign for Russian relief.

== Books ==
In his short life, Robertson published three books. The first,Traveler's Rest, published in South Carolina in 1938, was an historical novel based on his ancestors' experience in South Carolina. According to Time, the book was not received well by his neighbors in Clemson.

The second was I Saw England, published in 1941 by Alfred A. Knopf, which told of his interaction with the British during wartime. The last was Red Hills and Cotton: An Upcountry Memory, his best-known book. Published in 1942 by Alfred A. Knopf and republished in 1960 by the University of South Carolina Press, it has been in print ever since.

Robertson's papers are in the manuscript collection of Clemson University.

== Death and after ==
Robertson was one of 24 passengers killed on February 22, 1943, in the crash of the Pan Am Yankee Clipper into the Tagus River at Lisbon, Portugal. He was killed while en route from the United States to his new job, chief of the New York Herald-Tribune's London bureau. As the flying boat was banking into a descending turn prior to landing on the river its left wingtip touched the surface, causing it to dig in and crash into the river. Also killed was actress Tamara Drasin.

A fellow passenger was Jane Froman, who Robertson knew from their time together at the University of Missouri. Froman was one of 14 who survived; her story of survival was made into the 1952 film "With a Song in My Heart" starring Susan Hayward. Robertson's body was recovered and identified by a name bracelet he had on one wrist. After a funeral service in the Clemson College Chapel on April 18, 1943, he was buried in the Robertson family plot in West View Cemetery in Liberty, South Carolina.

A Liberty Ship, the SS Ben Robertson, named for him, was launched at Southeastern Shipbuilding Corporation, Savannah, Georgia, on January 4, 1944. Mrs. Julian Longley, Robertson's sister, of Dalton, Georgia, was sponsor for the new ship, part of a nationwide maritime program of naming Liberty ships for war correspondents killed in action.

== See also ==
- List of University of Missouri alumni
- List of accidents and incidents involving military aircraft (1940–1944)
- List of Liberty ships (A–F)
