= The Fleet's In =

1942 film by Victor Schertzinger

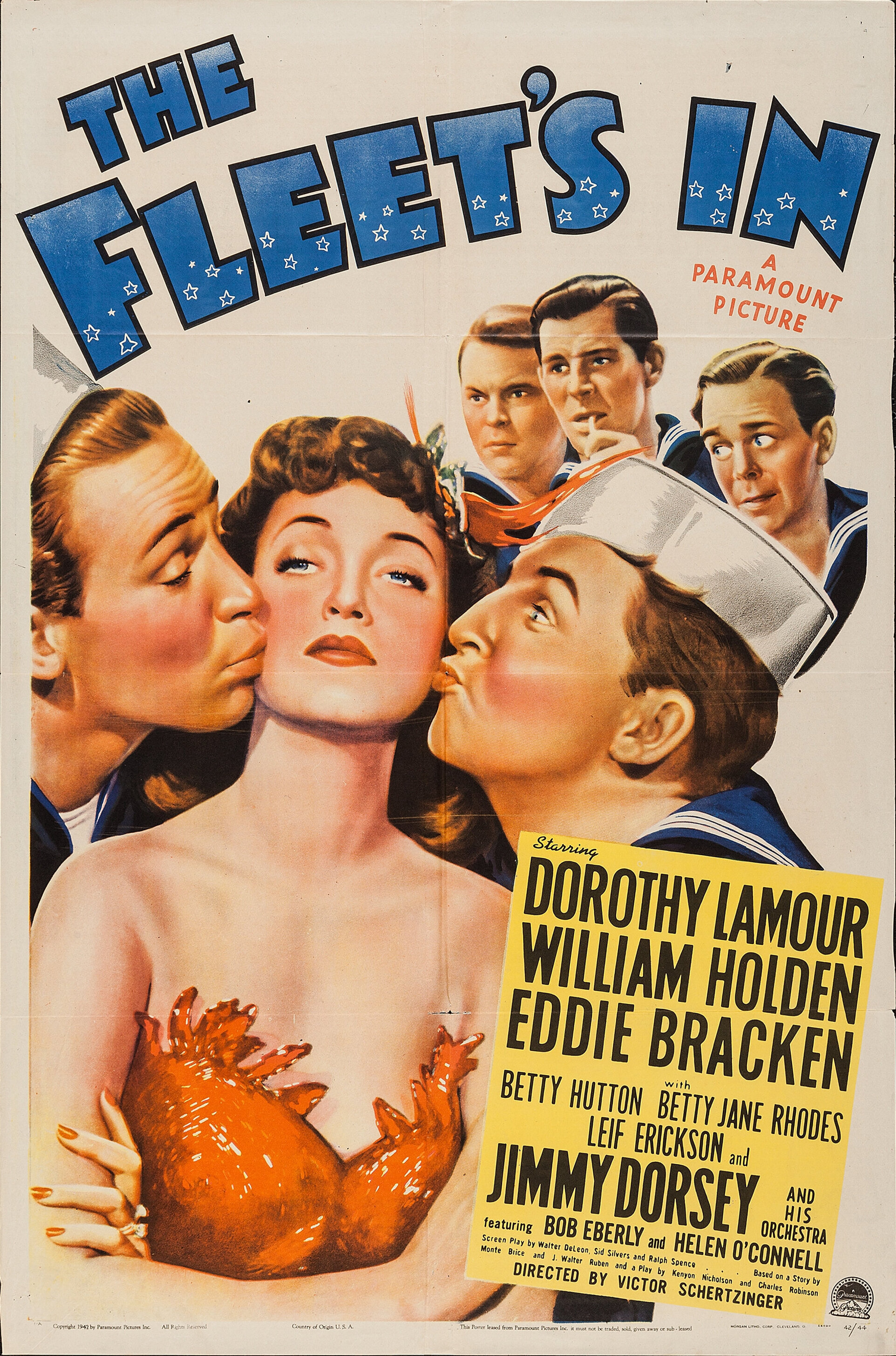
- Theatrical release poster
- Directed by: Victor Schertzinger
- Screenplay by: Walter DeLeon; Sid Silvers; Ralph Spence
- Story by: Monte Brice; J. Walter Ruben
- Based on: Sailor, Beware! by Kenyon Nicholson and Charles Robinson
- Produced by: Paul Jones
- Starring: Dorothy Lamour; William Holden; Eddie Bracken
- Cinematography: William C. Mellor
- Edited by: Paul Weatherwax
- Music by: Victor Schertzinger; Johnny Mercer
- Production company: Paramount Pictures
- Distributed by: Paramount Pictures
- Release dates: March 6, 1942 (Detroit); March 11, 1942 (United States)
- Running time: 93 minutes
- Country: United States
- Language: English
- Box office: $1,650,000 (US rentals)

The Fleet's In is a 1942 American romantic musical comedy film directed by Victor Schertzinger. Produced and released by Paramount Pictures, the film stars Dorothy Lamour, William Holden and Eddie Bracken, with Betty Hutton, Betty Jane Rhodes, Leif Erickson, Cass Daley, Gil Lamb, Barbara Britton, Lorraine and Rognan and Jimmy Dorsey and his Orchestra. The film was Hutton, Daley and Lamb's feature-film debut. This was the final film of Schertzinger's long directorial career, as he died shortly before the film's production was scheduled to end.

The film is both a remake of the 1928 Paramount film starring Clara Bow and Jack Oakie, and the second of three screen adaptations of the 1933 Kenyon Nicholson and Charles Robinson stage play "Sailor, Beware!", the other two being Lady Be Careful (1936) and Sailor Beware (1952). (Note: The opening credits of the film say that the film is both, "based on a story by" Monte Brice and J. Walter Ruben, the screenwriters of the Fleet's In (1928), "and a play by" Kenyon Nicholson and Charles Robinson.)

The film's songs are by Schertzinger and lyricist Johnny Mercer. Under the musical direction of Victor Young, the film introduced the songs "Tangerine", "Arthur Murray Taught Me Dancing in a Hurry" and "I Remember You", which are now part of the Great American Songbook.

The film centers on a timid sailor called Casey Kirby, played by Holden, who is tricked into kissing film star Diana Golden, played by Rhodes. His friend Barney Waters, played by Bracken, bets with fellow shipmates that he can kiss and romance the icy dancehall and nightclub singer, known only as the Countess, played by Lamour.

== Plot ==
Film star Diana Golden is performing for a group of sailors from the U.S.S. Dakota, including two friends, shy sailor Casey Kirby and Barney Waters. When Diana finishes performing, Casey catches her as she prepares to leave, and asks for her autograph for his little sister. However, Diana’s manager forces Casey to kiss Diana for a publicity photograph. In thanks for the kiss, Diana promises Casey a favour.

After the photograph circulates, believing Casey to be in Diana’s good books, the admiral’s daughter, Eileen, asks him if she can get Diana to attend her benefit party. When Casey promises to get Diana to go, Eileen kisses him in front of his shipmates. Shipmate and lady’s man Jake, jealous of Casey, bets with Barney that Casey cannot kiss the icy San Franciscan dancehall singer, the Countess.

While Barney is scrounging up money for the bet, he accidentally bets his buddy Spike’s expensive watch, which he gave to him for safekeeping. When Spike learns Barney bet his watch, he threatens to beat him up unless he gets the watch back. When the Dakota docks in San Francisco, Barney hauls Casey, who is unaware of the bet, to see the Countess perform at her dancehall, Swingland. After the show, the Countess’s manager suggests she sit with an old wealthy patron, for business. When Barney introduces Casey to the Countess, she is completely uninterested, however, when her manager brings the patron over, the Countess suddenly takes an “interest” in Casey.

After a dance, the Countess makes Casey walk her to her apartment, to further avoid the patron. However, the Countess accidentally falls for Casey when he carries her up the long flight of stairs to her apartment and invites him into her apartment. Fellow Swingland performer and the Countess’s roommate, Bessie Dale, who previously dated Barney, forces Barney to accompany her home. As the Countess and Casey are about to kiss, Barney accidentally mentions the bet to Bessie, who rushes to tell the Countess. An enraged Countess kicks the two sailors out of her apartment.

The next day, Barney and Bessie go boating, but Barney accidentally reveals to Bessie his plan to get Casey back into the Countess’s good graces, which involves giving Casey a cheap ring to propose to the Countess to convince her of his good intentions. Unaware of Barney’s plan, Casey, who is genuinely in love with the Countess, buys an expensive engagement ring to propose to her with. After Bessie repeats Barney’s plan to the Countess, Casey proposes to her. Believing the ring to be cheap and Casey’s intentions to be purely transactional, the Countess throws the ring out the window. After Casey shows the Countess the receipt for the ring, they both search for and retrieve it.

Later, at Swingland, as the Countess is participating in a conga line, Casey proposes to her. The dancehall’s manager believes Casey to be drunk and sends the dancehall’s bouncers after him. Casey fights back and a massive brawl occurs between the bouncers and the sailors. After the fight, Casey is brought to trial as the instigator and prepares to be dishonourably discharged from the navy. The Countess arrives at the trial and lies to the judge, stating that she coaxed Casey into proposing to her so she could get the expensive ring.

The charges against Casey are dropped and he and the Countess, as well as Barney and Bessie, are married by a minister in a taxi on the way to the dock. When they arrive at the dock, Casey and the Countess finally kiss in front of all the sailors. As Casey and Barney row back to the ship, the Countess and Bessie see them off.

== Cast ==
- Dorothy Lamour as the Countess
- William Holden as Casey Kirby
- Eddie Bracken as Barney Waters
- Betty Hutton as Bessie Dale
- Betty Jane Rhodes as Diana Golden
- Leif Erickson as Jake
- Cass Daley as Cissie
- Gil Lamb as Spike
- Barbara Britton as Eileen Wright
- Roy and Lorraine Rognan as Themselves
- Jimmy Dorsey and His Orchestra as Themselves
- Bob Eberly as Vocalist
- Helen O'Connell as Vocalist
- Robert Warwick as Admiral Wright (uncredited)
- Jack Norton as Kellogg (uncredited)
- Roy Atwell as Arthur Sidney (uncredited)

== Soundtrack ==
Victor Schertzinger (music) and Johnny Mercer (lyrics) wrote ten songs for the movie, however, only eight were used.

The songs used are:

- ”The Fleet's In" — (Music by Victor Schertzinger & Lyrics by Johnny Mercer) Performed by Betty Jane Rhodes and reprised by Eddie Bracken with Male Chorus
- "Tangerine" — (Music by Victor Schertzinger & Lyrics by Johnny Mercer) Performed by Bob Eberly and Helen O'Connell with Jimmy Dorsey and His Orchestra
- "When You Hear the Time Signal" — (Music by Victor Schertzinger & Lyrics by Johnny Mercer) Performed by Dorothy Lamour with Jimmy Dorsey and His Orchestra
- "If You Build a Better Mousetrap" — (Music by Victor Schertzinger & Lyrics by Johnny Mercer) Performed by Betty Hutton with Jimmy Dorsey and His Orchestra and reprised by Bob Eberly and Helen O'Connell
- "Not Mine" — (Music by Victor Schertzinger & Lyrics by Johnny Mercer) Performed by Dorothy Lamour, Eddie Bracken, Bob Eberly with Jimmy Dorsey and His Orchestra
- "I Remember You" — (Music by Victor Schertzinger & Lyrics by Johnny Mercer) Performed by Dorothy Lamour, Bob Eberly, Helen O'Connell with Jimmy Dorsey and His Orchestra. Reprised by Lorraine and Rognan
- "Arthur Murray Taught Me Dancing in a Hurry" — (Music by Victor Schertzinger & Lyrics by Johnny Mercer) Performed by Betty Hutton with Jimmy Dorsey and His Orchestra
- "Tomorrow You Belong to Uncle Sammy" — (Music by Victor Schertzinger & Lyrics by Johnny Mercer) Performed by Cass Daley with Jimmy Dorsey and His Orchestra

== Production ==
The film was announced in March, 1941, with Monte Brice hired to write the screenplay. Originally, the film was to star Bing Crosby, Bob Hope and Lamour.

FIlming was scheduled to begin on August 11, 1941. Filming started on September 15, 1941 and ended in early November, 1941. Schertzinger died unexpectedly in his sleep on October 26th, 1941, shortly before production of the film was scheduled to end. Ralph Murphy stepped in as director after Schertzinger's passing and completed the film. However, Murphy did not receive on-screen credit.

Jimmy Dorsey and his Orchestra were paid $75,000 to appear in the film.

== Release and reception ==
The film premiered at the Michigan Theatre in Detroit on March 6, 1942, without a stage show. The Fleet's In had its nationwide premiere at the Paramount Theatre in New York City on March 11, 1942 with the stage show headed by Connee Boswell.

Time Magazine said that, "The Fleet’s In (Paramount) is exactly what its title suggests: something to entertain the boys on shore leave. Some of this entertainment weighs around 120 lb., looks good and steps lively. The rest is a massive aggregation of singers, dancers, assorted entertainers (rubber-jointed Betty Hutton, et al.) and little Jimmy Dorsey’s molten musicians. The result is hot & cold, but makes a cheerful rushing sound. It took seven writers to produce Fleet’s story—a prodigal waste of talent."

The Motion Picture Herald wrote that, "The Fleet's In," is a nautical story, one of gobs on leave and girls, interspersed with romance, songs, music and dancing and an abundance of entertaining comedy. It is a story designed and produced to relieve patrons and exhibitors of the strain and concern perpetrated by the daily headlines. It is also a story which will send the patrons home happy and humming while the showman counts his receipts."

Photoplay Magazine ranked the film as "good" writing that, "Meant only for fun and entertainment, this gay musical succeeds in its purpose admirably. Dorothy Lamour is at her loveliest and William Holden is most likable as the sailor. The fun starts when movie star Betty Jane Rhodes kisses Holden for a publicity stunt and his fellow gobs become convinced that he's irresistible to women. And when the admiral's daughter is seen kissing him, his shipmates bet all they've got that he can also kiss singer Dorothy Lamour, who'll have nothing to do with sailors. This leads to much fun. Eddie Bracken also does a fine job as Holden's pal, with whom the vigorous Betty Hutton is in love, and Leif Erickson is good. The music of Jimmy Dorsey and his orchestra is wonderful."
