= Roy Rognan =

American dancer and acrobat

Roy Rognan (4 April 1910 - 22 February 1943) was an American dancer and acrobat. He was killed in 1943 in the crash of the Pan American operated Boeing flying boat Yankee Clipper in Lisbon which also killed Tamara Drasin and injured Jane Froman and Rongan's wife, Jean.

He was best known for his dance act with his wife under the name "Lorraine and Rognan".

== Life ==
Roy Rognan was born on 4 April 1910 in Sandpoint, Bonner County, Idaho, US, to Alma Helmina (nee Larson) and John Erling Rognan. John had immigrated from Norway. On 4 November 1937 in Cook, Illinois, United States Rognan married Jean Muriel O'Rourke who was born on 18 January 1912.

From approximately 1938 onwards the couple performed under the name "Lorraine and Rognan" as a comedy ballroom dance team in vaudeville and in two Paramount musicals The Fleet's In (1942) and Salute for Three (1943).

The couple were travelling as part of a United Service Organizations group that was on Pan American Boeing 314 flying boat Yankee Clipper which crashed while attempting to land on the Tagus River at Lisbon, Portugal, on 22 February 1943. Rognan was killed, his body being found washed up on a beach at the mouth of the Tagus.

Jean was seriously injured with a leg crushed, her back hurt and had seven teeth knocked out. Jean later flew home.

After she had recovered Jean returned to performing with the USO, travelling to England in March 1944 to entertain.

In 1944 Jean Rognan unsuccessfully sued Pan American for $425,000. In reply Pan American offered $8,291 for personal injuries and $414 for loss of their baggage, citing the provisions of the Warsaw Convention on international transportation.

Jean later married Matthew Rosen. Under the compensatory provisions of the Federal Employees' Compensation Act a private law passed in 1958 awarded her, $24,625.30 as compensation for the injuries she had suffered in the crash of the Yankee Clipper.

Jean died on 22 August 1969 in Los Angeles.
