= Leave It to Me! =

1938 musical

- Original Broadway Playbill
- Music: Cole Porter
- Lyrics: Cole Porter
- Book: Samuel and Bella Spewack
- Productions: 1938 Broadway

Leave It to Me! is a 1938 musical produced by Vinton Freedley with music and lyrics by Cole Porter. The book was a collaborative effort by Samuel and Bella Spewack, the former of whom also directed the Broadway production. The musical was based on the play Clear All Wires by the Spewacks, which was performed on Broadway for 93 performances in 1932, and which was filmed in 1933, starring Lee Tracy, Benita Hume, Una Merkel and James Gleason.

It was set in Stalinist Russia in the 1930s, with Stalin himself appearing at the end. But its comic treatment of Soviets and Nazis seemed misplaced during the Cold War, and the show was not revived until the late 1980s.

Mary Martin made her Broadway debut in this musical, which introduced the songs "Get Out of Town" and "My Heart Belongs to Daddy."

== Productions ==
The musical had pre-Broadway tryouts at the Shubert Theatre, New Haven, starting on October 13, 1938 and then at the Shubert Theatre, Boston, starting on October 17, 1938.

It opened on Broadway at the Imperial Theatre on November 9, 1938 and closed on July 15, 1939 after 291 performances. It reopened on September 4, 1939 and closed September 16, 1939 for another 16 performances. The choreography was by Robert Alton, costumes by Raoul Pene du Bois, set by Albert Johnson, and Ernest K. Gann was the General Manager. The cast featured William Gaxton, Victor Moore, Sophie Tucker, Mary Martin, Tamara Drasin, and Alexander Asro. In his first Broadway show, Gene Kelly had a role as a dancer and Secretary to Mr. Goodhue. The original production ended with the appearance of Joseph Stalin, who led a final dance to the Soviet anthem The Internationale. After the signing of the Nazi-Soviet pact, Stalin was dropped from the show.

The Equity Library Theater in New York City presented a revival of the show – the first time it was revived in the United States – in March 1988. The "Musicals Tonight!" series, New York City, held a staged concert in March 2001. 42nd Street Moon Theatre Company, San Francisco, presented the musical in November–December 2001.

== Plot ==
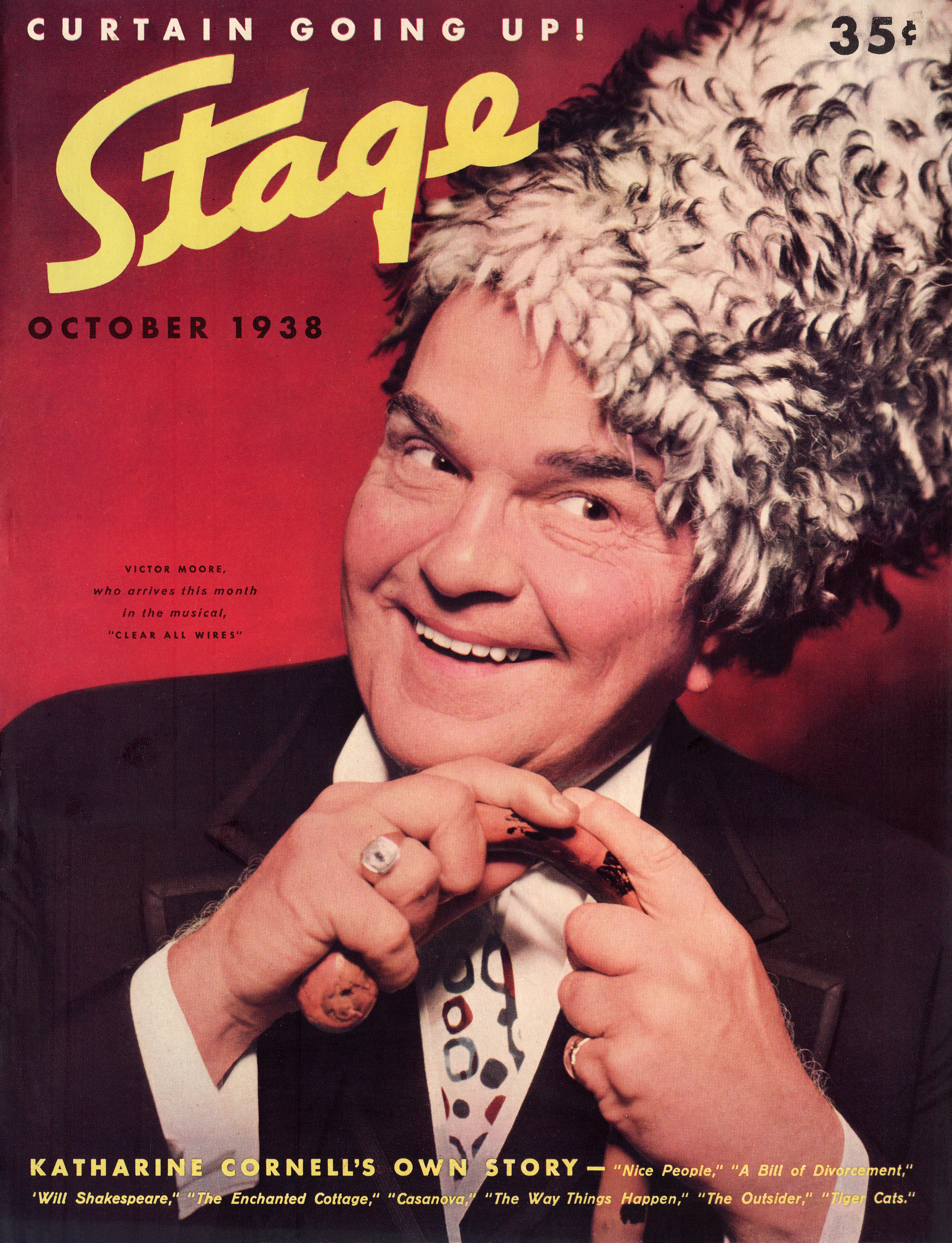
Victor Moore as Alonzo "Stinky" Goodhue on the cover of Stage magazine (October 1938)

In the late 1930s, aging businessman Alonzo "Stinky" Goodhue has become the American ambassador to the Soviet Union. The job was secured for him by his social-climbing wife, Leora, who helped to fund Franklin Roosevelt's re-election campaign. However, "Stinky" has no desire to live in Stalinist Russia. He is longing for the pleasures of his home in Topeka, Kansas, especially banana splits. He hopes his tenure as ambassador will be a short one. Meanwhile, an ambitious newspaper reporter, Buckley J. "Buck" Thomas, is employed to discredit Goodhue by his publisher who wants to be the ambassador himself. When Thomas and Goodhue realise they both have the same aims, they work together.

Goodhue plans to make major diplomatic gaffes, which will be publicised by Thomas. He delivers an inflammatory speech, but is hailed for his courage. He kicks the Ambassador of Nazi Germany, to the delight of the Soviets. He then attempts to shoot a Soviet official, but hits a counter-revolutionary aristocrat instead. Each time he ends up being hailed as a hero (in a parody of diplomatic speak, the British ambassador says "Britain views your deed [kicking the Nazi] with pride and alarm, congratulates and condemns you, and will now perform its breathtaking triple loop, suspended by a single wire, sitting in a tub of water."). His recall seems further away than ever.

In a subplot, Buck Thomas is involved with his boss's "protégée", the free-spirited Dolly Winslow. He falls in love with Colette, one of Goodhue's daughters. He has to extract himself from Dolly to win Colette. Dolly eventually finds herself stranded at a railroad station in Siberia. She slowly takes off her furs to admirers as she sings of her flirtations, but insists "My Heart Belongs to Daddy", referring to her "sweet millionaire" sugar-daddy.

The ambassador finally resolves to give up his tricks and tries to promote good relations between the United States and the Soviet Union; however his sincere attempts to improve matters now go disastrously wrong. He finally gets his wish to be recalled back to Topeka.

== Original cast and characters ==
- Buckley J. "Buck" Thomas - William Gaxton
- Alonzo "Stinky" Goodhue - Victor Moore
- Mrs. Leora Goodhue - Sophie Tucker
- Colette - Tamara Drasin
- Dolly Winslow - Mary Martin

== Musical numbers ==
Act 1

- "How Do You Spell Ambassador?" - Reporters
- "We Drink to You, J.H. Hardy" - Buckley Joyce Thomas and Guests
- "Vite, Vite, Vite" - Porters and Girls
- "I'm Taking the Steps to Russia" - Mrs. Goodhue, Mrs. Goodhue's Daughters, Secretaries to Mr. Goodhue and Les Girls
- "Get Out of Town" - Colette
- "When It's All Said and Done" - Buckley Joyce Thomas, Dolly Winslow and Les Girls
- "Most Gentlemen Don't Like Love" - Mrs. Goodhue, Mrs. Goodhue's Daughters and Secretaries to Mr. Goodhue
- "Comrade Alonzo" - Ensemble

Act 2

- "From Now On" - Buckley Joyce Thomas and Colette
- "I Want to Go Home" - Alonzo P. Goodhue
- "My Heart Belongs to Daddy" - Dolly Winslow
- "Tomorrow" - Mrs. Goodhue and Ensemble
- "Far, Far Away" - Buckley Joyce Thomas and Colette
- "From the U.S.A. to the U.S.S.R." - Alonzo P. Goodhue, Mrs. Goodhue and Mrs. Goodhue's Daughters

Additional material

- "Il bacio" with music by Luigi Arditi and lyrics by Gottardo Aldighieri was interpolated into the show for part of its run, but was ultimately dropped.

== Critical response ==
In The New York Times, Brooks Atkinson found the 1938 Broadway production was a "handsome carnival" consisting of "comic rumpus", in which Porter provided a "swift, smart and ingenious" score and lyrics that sparkled. In Life, David Ewen wrote that Mary Martin "stole the limelight...in her Broadway debut." Appearing in a scene at a railway station, she did "a mock strip tease while removing her ermine wraps, and all the while chanting in a baby voice, 'My Heart Belongs to Daddy.' The house went into an uproar, thereby proclaiming a new queen of musical comedy."
