= 1959 Pan Am Douglas DC-6 crash =

1959 aviation accident in Ireland

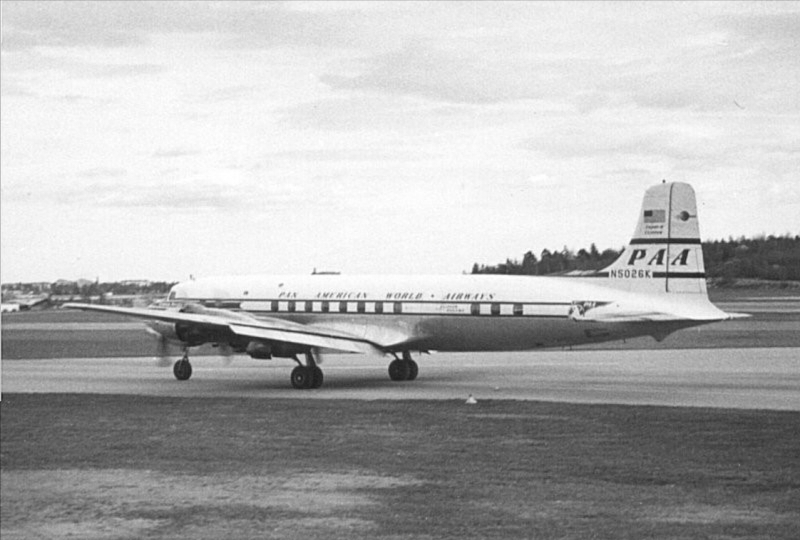
- N5026K, the aircraft involved in the accident

Accident
- Date: June 22, 1959
- Summary: Propeller failure, engine separation
- Site: Shannon Airport, Ireland; 52°42′57.86″N 8°53′55.3″W

Aircraft
- Aircraft type: Douglas DC-6B
- Aircraft name: Clipper Panama
- Operator: Pan American World Airways
- Registration: N5026K
- Flight origin: Frankfurt
- 1st stopover: Heathrow Airport
- Last stopover: Shannon Airport
- Destination: New York City
- Passengers: 2
- Crew: 6
- Fatalities: 0
- Survivors: 8

On June 22, 1959, a Pan Am cargo flight went from Frankfurt to New York City via London Heathrow and Shannon. It caught fire on takeoff from Shannon and was destroyed. All six flight crew and two passengers survived.

== Description ==
Pan American Airways Douglas DC-6B registered N5026K, named Clipper Panama was delivered on 28 May 1954. In 1958 it spent some time on lease to National Airlines but was returned to Pan Am.

On 22 June 1959, under charter, Clipper Panama departed Frankfurt for New York with intermediate stops at Heathrow Airport and Shannon Airport. Captain Robert Realm and First Officer Henry R. Hayes were onboard with a crew of four plus two passengers. Having refueled at Shannon, the plane was preparing for take off and on applying takeoff power, a loud noise was heard and the takeoff abandoned. Engine No. 4 had separated from the wing and a fire erupted, destroying the aircraft just after the crew and passengers escaped in 30 seconds via the emergency chute. Six dogs died in the cargo hold, and an airport fire engine fighting the blaze caught fire and was destroyed.

According to the Dublin Evening Herald, cargo and some mail were destroyed in the resulting fire but it is unclear where the mail had been loaded.

== Cause of the accident ==
The No. 4 engine suffered a fatigue failure of its No. 1 propeller blade. According to lab results, the blade had previously been bent which resulted "in the disruption of the compressive stresses in the shot peened area of the propeller blade" being the probable cause because the unbalanced loads on the engine mounts resulted in the separation of the entire engine.
