= Yankee Clipper (flying boat) =

Pan Am Boeing 314 flying boat

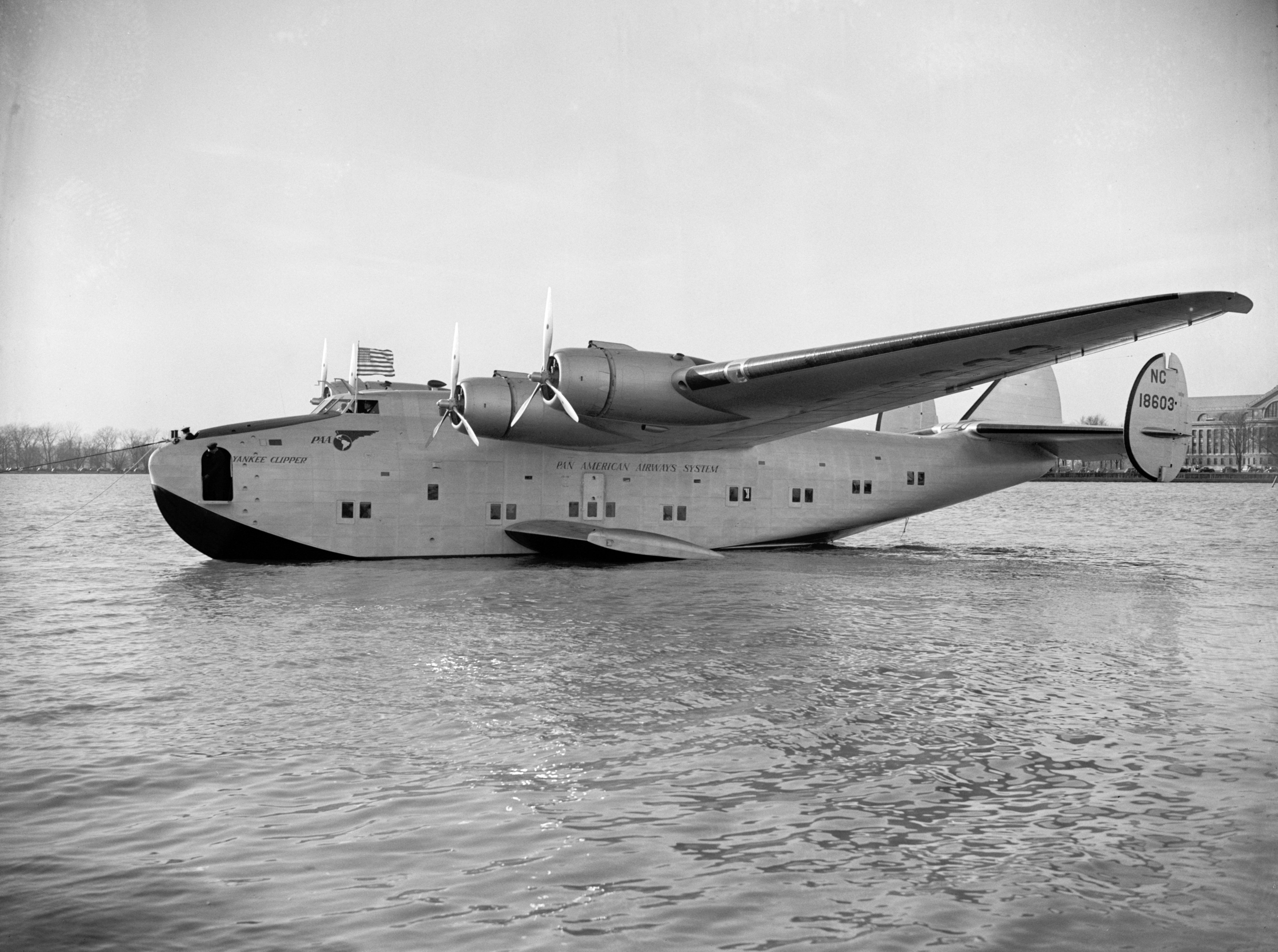
- Yankee Clipper in 1939

General information
- Type: Boeing 314
- Owners: Pan American World Airways 1939-1941; American government 13 December 1942-1943
- Construction number: 1990
- Registration: NC18603
- Serial: 48224
- Total hours: 8505

History
- Manufactured: 1938-1939
- First flight: 1939
- In service: 1939 to 1943
- Fate: Crashed - scrapped

The Yankee Clipper (civil registration NC18603) was an American Boeing 314 Clipper flying boat, best known for on 20 May 1939 beginning the first scheduled airmail service between the United States and Europe. It crashed on 22 February 1943 while attempting to land on the River Tagus in Lisbon, Portugal, killing 24 of the 39 people on board. Among the dead were writer and war correspondent Ben Robertson and singer Tamara Drasin.

== Service history ==
The Yankee Clipper was one of six Model 314 flying boats ordered by Pan American airlines from the Boeing Airplane Company on 21 July 1936. Allocated the civil registration NC18603 it was delivered to Pan American in February 1939. After it was delivered to Pan American, NC18603 was flown from its base at San Francisco on the night of 23 February 1939 by Captain Harold E. Gray to Pan American’s base at Logan Airport in Baltimore in preparation for entering servicing with the company's Atlantic division. Gray together with Charles Vaughn then flew it to Anacostia in Maryland where on 3 March in the presence of Juan Trippe it was christened Yankee Clipper by First Lady Eleanor Roosevelt with a bottle containing water from all seven seas in front of approximately 3,000 onlookers with numerous more listening to a live radio broadcast.

=== Survey flight to Europe ===
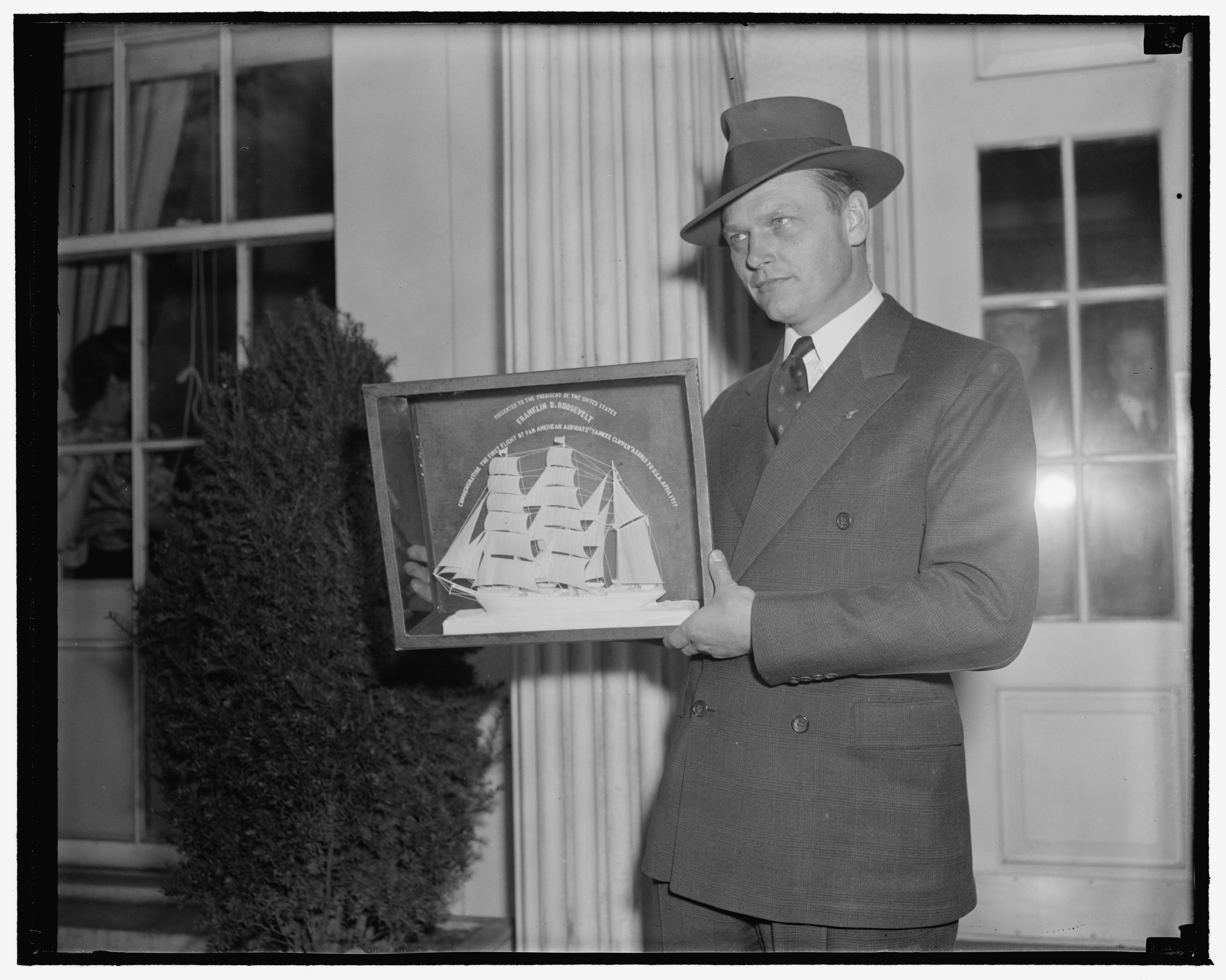
Harold Gray, captain of the Yankee Clipper presents the American President Washington, D.C., with model of old Portuguese sailing bark on 20 April 1939 upon his return from the flying boats survey flight to Europe

The French Government had approved Pan American flights to Marseille on 20 January 1939 and so on 26 March Gray captained the Yankee Clipper on a 11,000 miles (18,000 km) survey flight from the United States to Europe, via the "Southern route". The first leg of the flight, Baltimore to Horta, Azores, took 17 hours and 32 minutes and covered 2,400 miles (3,900 km). The second leg from Horta to Pan American's newly built airport in Lisbon took seven hours and seven minutes and covered 1,200 miles (1,900 km). It spent three days here familiarising the Horta's base personnel with the aircraft before flying on to Marseille and then to Southampton which it reached after a four hour flight on 4 April. After being delayed by a storm in Southampton it then flew on to Foynes in Ireland reaching it on 11 April after a two hour 42 minute flight. It returned via Lisbon and the Azores to Baltimore which it reached on 16 April with 22 people on board, having taken 83 hours of flying time to make the 11,071 miles (17,817 km) return journey. Following the flight, Gray described the flight both in print and over the radio for the National Broadcasting Company.

=== Inaugurates first airmail service between the United States and Europe ===
After Pan American was approved on 18 May 1939 to operate a route across the Northern Atlantic, the Yankee Clipper under the command of Captain Arthur E. LaPorte with a crew of 14 and two company observers and 1,603 pounds (727 kg) of mail on board departed on 20 May from Port Washington, New York, in what was the first scheduled airmail service across the Atlantic to Europe with stops taking 13 hours and 23 minutes to cover the 2,300 miles (3,700 km) to Horta. The flying boat had expected to stay only for two and a half hours, but this was extended to six hours and 19 minutes due to the time it took for the postal officials to stamp the 23,000 pieces of mail on board. It eventually reached Lisbon 26 hours and 30 minutes after leaving New York, 20 hours and 16 minutes of which had been spent in the air. It then flew on to Marseilles before terminating in Southampton. As there were so many first-day covers, the crew had to assist postal officials in cancelling the stamps. Seven days later, the flying boat returned to New York, via Marseilles, Lisbon, and the Azores with 1,133 pounds (514 kg) of mail from these locations, equivalent to 85,000 first flight covers having completing the first commercial (round-trip) airmail flight across the Atlantic.

On 24 June 1939 the Yankee Clipper departed on the inaugural flight carrying airmail via the Northern route from New York to Southampton via Newfoundland and Foynes, returning back to the United States on 1 July.

Departing from Port Washington on 8 July under the command of Captain LaPorte, the Yankee Clipper made her first flight carrying passengers on the Northern route from New York to England, travelling via Shedian in New Brunswick, Botwood in Newfoundland and Foynes in Ireland before terminating in Southampton. Carrying 557 pounds (253 kg) of mail, most of the 19 passengers on board were reporters, editors and people associated with the airline. Courtesy of the mayor of New York, the passengers were given a police escort from the Pan American ticket office in Manhattan to the airport. The flying boat reached Southampton on 10 July, the flight having taken 27 hours and 20 minutes of which 22 hours and 34 minutes was flying time. On 13 October Yankee Clipper left Port Washington for Lisbon with 35 passengers (all but four alighting in Bermuda) and 1,385 pounds (628 kg) of mail, setting a record for the eastbound crossing. Afterwards the service moved to a new North America terminal at La Guardia. The Yankee Clipper completed the 200th transatlantic crossing by a Pan American flying boat when it landed at La Guardia Field on 4 August 1940 with 35 passengers onboard from Lisbon. On 3 September 1940 it departed with eight passengers, 1,851 pounds (840 kg) of mail and 221 pounds of typhoid serum to immunize 8,000 individuals and thus help in combating an outbreak of typhoid in unoccupied France.

=== Wartime service ===
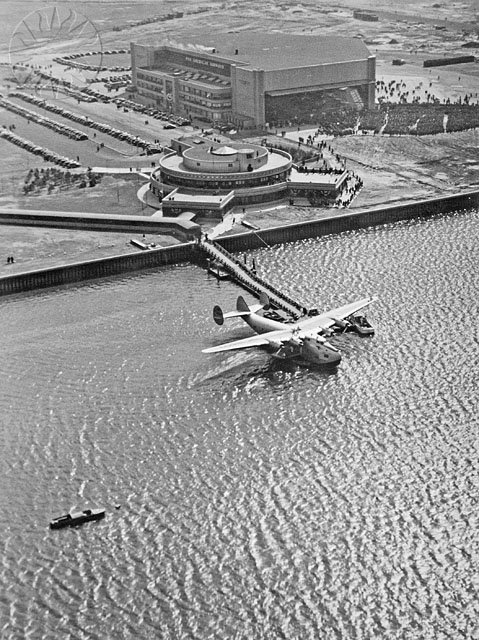
Aerial view of Yankee Clipper at anchor at the LaGuardia Marine Air Terminal, New York, circa 1940.

Following the entry of the United States into World War II in December 1941 Yankee Clipper together with the rest of the Pan American’s fleet of 314s was requisitioned on 13 December 1941 by the American War Department who assigned it to the United States Navy, who gave it the BuNo designation 48224. It continued to be maintained and operated by Pan American on behalf of the navy, with all flight crew becoming part of the naval military reserve. The Yankee Clipper initially continued to provide a passenger service between the United States, Portugal and the United Kingdom, transporting high-priority passengers, such as high-ranking officers, scientists, war correspondents and USO entertainers, mail, and high value cargo.

=== Last flight ===
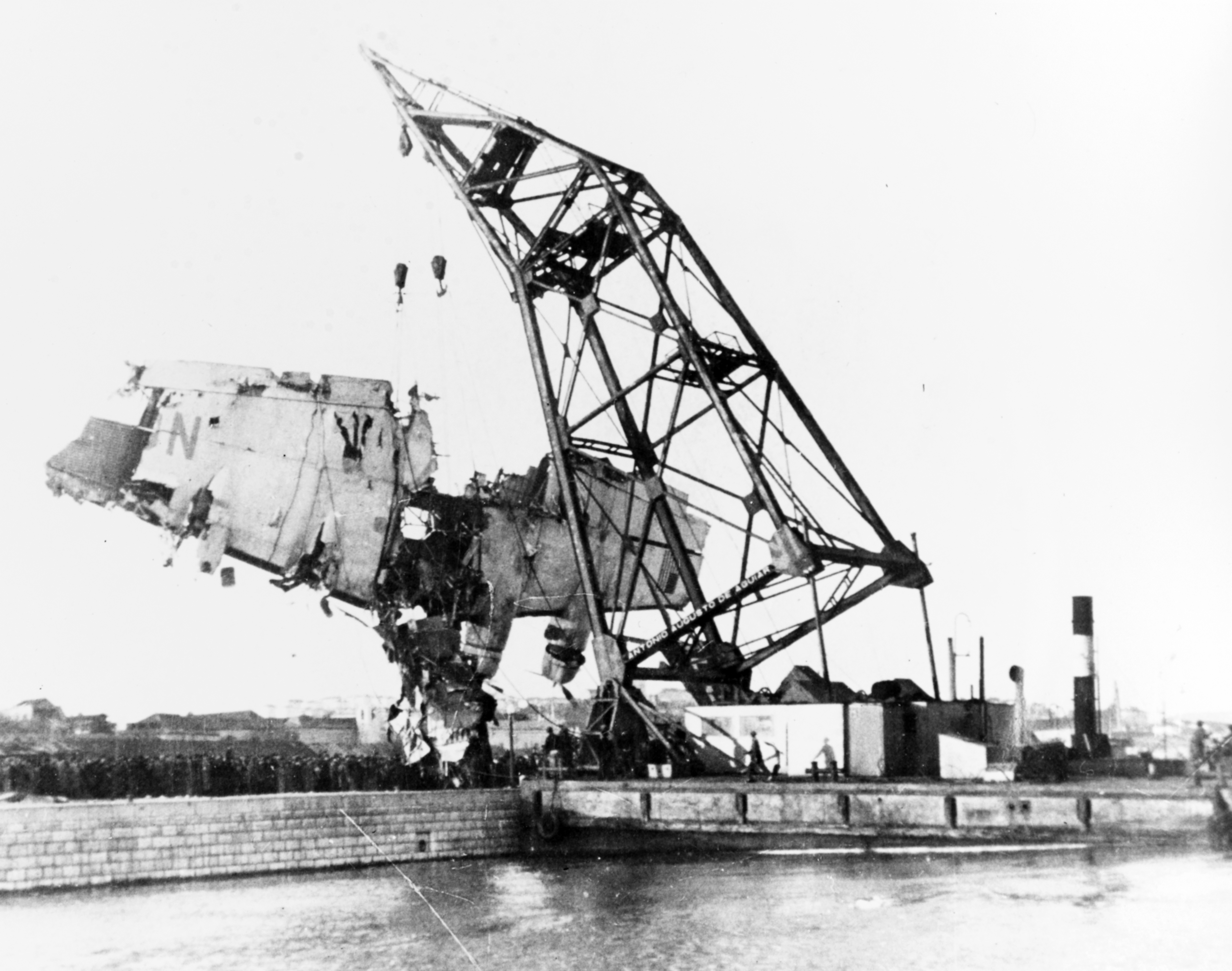
A floating crane places the wreckage of Yankee Clipper on a quay at Lisbon, 22 February 1943)

Under the command of R. O. D. Sullivan the flying boat departed New York on 21 February and travelled via Bermuda and Horta to Lisbon, from which it was intended it would continue on with a different crew to Africa and South America, and finally back to New York. During a descending turn over the River Tagus at Lisbon, Portugal on 22 February 1943 its left wingtip hit the water. The wingtip hitting the water caused it to skim along the water before digging in and which caused it to crash at approximately 6.47pm into the water and break into several pieces. It remained partially submerged before sinking within 10 minutes approximately 2 miles (3.2 km) east of Cabo Ruivo Airport. Rescue efforts were undertaken by two Pan American launches and a BOAC launch.

The weather was cloudy with light intermittent showers, a wind of 6 knots with visibility of 7 miles with sufficient light available for the flying boat to be observed from shore and thus was considered not to have contributed to the crash. At the controls were 50-year-old Sullivan and Rush was in the co-pilot's seat. Sullivan claimed that the flying boat was flying level and traveling parallel at an altitude of approximately 600 feet (180 m) about 1.5 miles (2.4 km) to the northeasterly of the north-south string of landing lights. His intention was to reach their northern end and then make a 180 degree turn and travel back down to once again turn and make a normal approach from the south. Sullivan claimed that the nose slowly dropped for no explainable reason which had not alarmed him until the altitude reached 400 feet (120 m), at which point he made a left descending turn and attempted to make emergency landing. He couldn't explain when asked by the accident investigators from the Civil Aeronautics Board (CAB) why he hadn't opted to increase power to pull the plane up to a higher altitude and make a new approach. All other survivors stated that the everything seemed normal until the moment of impact. The wreckage was retrieved from the river and examined. The investigators after examining the retrieved flying boats control circuits, found everything intact and in good order except for one small part. In exhaustive flight tests in April over Long Island Sound, with Sullivan aboard, they confirmed that, even if that part had failed prior to the crash, it would not have affected the flying boat ability to be safely flown.

Sullivan (1893–1955) who had made 55 Pacific crossings and 100 Atlantic crossings was blamed for the accident and left Pan American and aviation.

Of the 39 on board, 19 passengers and five crew members were killed. Of the survivors, two passengers had serious injuries, and two minor while the crew member’s injuries ranged from serious to minor. Among the dead were writer and war correspondent Ben Robertson and singer, Tamara Drasin who was among a number of USO performers travelling on the flying boat to entertain troops. Of the remaining eight passengers, two received serious injuries, two minor injuries and four were uninjured, while seven crew members received injuries ranging from serious to minor. Singer Jane Froman who had given up her seat to Drasin prior to flight was among the seriously injured. The co-pilot, John Curtis Burn, who broke his back in the crash, fashioned a makeshift raft from portions of the wrecked plane to help keep himself and Froman afloat until they were rescued. Her story of survival was made into the 1952 film "With a Song in My Heart" starring Susan Hayward.

In 1944 Jane Froman sued Pan American for one million dollars while Jean Rognan sued for $425,000 and Gypsy Markoff $100,000. In reply Pan American offered $8,291 for personal injuries and $414 for loss of their baggage, citing the provisions of the Warsaw Convention on international transportation. Jane Froman and Gypsy Markoff continued legal action against Pan American using the services of lawyer Harry A. Gair, a pioneer in the field of aviation crash litigation.

Under the compensatory provisions of the Federal Employees' Compensation Act a private law passed in 1958 awarded Jane Froman and Gypsy Markoff $23,403.58 each, and Jean Rosen (the widow of Roy Rognan), $24,625.30.

==== Members of the flight ====
The fates of those on the flight were:

Crew

- Robert Oliver Daniel Sullivan, Captain. He had the Pan American title of master pilot. By the time of the crash, he had accumulated 14,352 hours in his logbook, 3,278 of them on the Boeing 314.
- Herman Stanton Rush, First Officer. Killed. By the time of the crash, he had accumulated 1,706 hours in as a co-pilot with Pan American more than 1,454 of them on the Boeing 314.
- Merwin Osterhout, Second Officer.
- Andrew Roy Freeland, Third Officer. Killed.
- John Curtis Burn, Fourth Officer. Broke his back.
- Joseph F. Vaughan, First Engineer. Killed.
- William H. Manning, Second Engineer.
- David M. Sanders, First Radio Officer.
- Robert Rowan, Second Radio Officer.
- Leonard A. Ingles, Supernumerary. Killed.
- Philp Casprini, Steward.
- Craig Robinson, Steward. Killed.
- D. Oliva, Radio Officer. He disembarked at Bermuda.

Passengers

- William Walton Butterworth, Jr., American State Department. First Secretary of the American Embassy at Lisbon.
- Frank Josef Cuhel, Former Olympian and war correspondent for the Mutual Broadcasting System. Killed.
- Manuel Diaz, Garcia & Diaz Shipping. Killed.
- Tamara Drasin, Singer, USO. Killed.
- Grace G. Drysdale, puppeteer, USO.
- Joshua Edelman, Captain, U.S. Army Corps of Engineers. Killed.
- Jane Froman, singer, USO. Seriously injured.
- James A. Hamlin, Major, U.S. Army. Killed.
- George T. Hart, Major, U.S. Army. Killed.
- Theodore W. Lamb, office of Civilian Defence. Killed.
- Arthur A. Lee, Ardee Pictures Corporation. Killed.
- Gypsy Markoff (Born Olga Witkowska), accordionist, USO. She required 17 operations and approximately $40,000 in medical bills in recovering from the injuries she received in the crash. She was left with two paralyzed left-hand fingers.
- Burton C. Mossman, Jr., Major, U.S. Army. Killed.
- James E. Pepper, Captain, U.S. Army. Killed.
- John N. Poto, Major, U.S. Army. Killed.
- Ben Robertson, New York Herald Tribune. Killed. He was travelling to England to head the United Kingdom office of the New York Herald Tribune.
- Jean Muriel Rognan (Jean Lorraine), dancer, USO. Seriously injured. Wife of Roy Rognan.
- Roy Rognan, dancer and acrobat, USO. Killed.
- Clifford A. Sheldon, Lieutenant, U.S. Army.
- Harry G. Siedel, Standard Oil of New Jersey. Killed.
- Elsa Harris Silver (Yvette), Singer, USO.
- George A. Spiegelberg, Major, U.S.. Army. He was a member of General Dwight D. Eisenhower’s staff.
- Paul Sprout, Captain, U.S. Army. Killed.
- Earl G. Stoy, Major U.S. Army. Killed.
- Luther D. Wallis. Lieutenant Colonel Killed.
- Milton H. Weisman, Major, U.S. Army. Killed.
- James N. Wright, State Department courier. Killed.

== Bibliography ==
- Blower, Brooke L. (2023). Americans in a World at War: Intimate Histories from the Crash of Pan Am's Yankee Clipper (Hardcover). Oxford: Oxford University Press. ISBN 9780199322008.
- Bowers, Peter M. (November 1977). "The Great Clippers" (PDF). Airpower. 7 (6). Sentry Books: 26–35, 60, 61.
- Bowers, Peter M. (December 1977). "Flying the Boeing Clipper: Complete Operational History". Wings. 7 (6): 14–15.
- Klaás, M.D. (June 1969). "The Incredible Clippers". Air Classics. Vol. 5, no. 5.
- Klaás, M.D. (April 1991). "When the Clippers Went to War". Air Classics. Vol. 27, no. 4.
- Klaás, M. D. (February 1993). "Clipper Flight 9035". Air Classics. 29 (2).
- Trautman, James (2011). Pan American Clippers: The Golden Age of Flying Boats (Softcover). Erin, Ontario, Canada: Boston Mills Press. ISBN 978-1-55407-894-3.
