= Bob Ripa =

American entertainer

Bob Ripa (born Eyvind Hansen; March 1, 1913 – December 17, 1943) was an American juggler. Ripa was participating in a USO tour when the Douglas C-47 he was travelling on crashed in the island of Manra on December 17, 1943, killing all nine people on board.

He was a leading juggler of the time.
