= Tamara Drasin =

American singer (1905–1943)

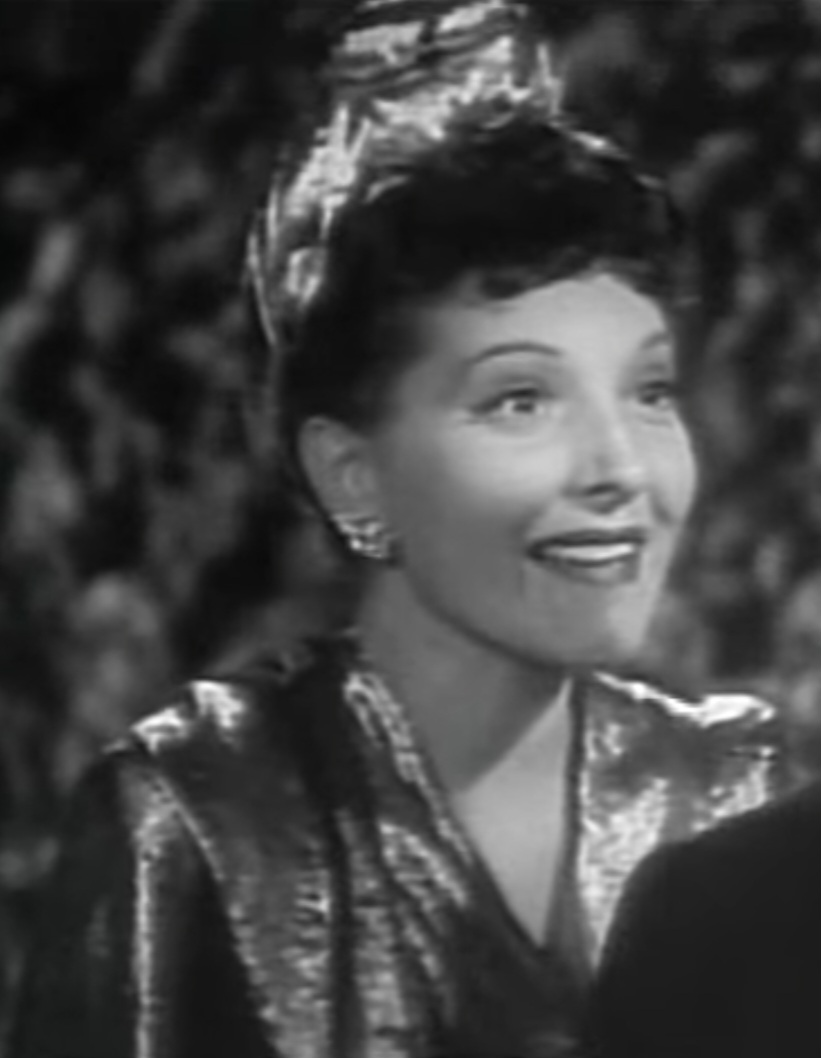
- Drasin in No, No, Nanette (1940)

Background information
- Born: Tamara Drasin c. 1905; Sorochintsï, Russian Empire
- Died: 22 February 1943 (age c. 37) Lisbon, Portugal
- Genre: Jazz
- Occupations: Actress, singer
- Instrument: Vocals
- Years active: 1927–1943

Tamara Drasin (c. 1905 – 22 February 1943), often credited as simply Tamara, was a singer and actress who introduced the song "Smoke Gets in Your Eyes" in the 1933 Broadway musical Roberta.

Tamara Drasin is sometimes confused with two other performers of the 1930s musical era, the dancers Tamara Geva and Tamara Toumanova.

== Early life ==
Drasin was born around 1905 in the village of Sorochintsï in Poltava Governorate (modern-day Ukraine), the daughter of Hinda "Eda" and Boris Drasin, a tailor. Her family moved to the U.S. in 1922.

== Stage career ==
With her dark, exotic looks and throbbing vocal style, Drasin was ideal casting material for European characters in musicals of the 1930s. In Free for All, she was Marishka Tarasov; in Roberta, she was Princess Stephanie of Russian nobility; and in Right This Way and Leave It to Me!, she portrayed Frenchwomen. In all, Drasin appeared in seven musicals, from 1927 to 1938.

== Music career ==
Besides "Smoke Gets in Your Eyes" and another ballad, "The Touch of Your Hand", in Roberta, Drasin introduced three other standards: "I Can Dream, Can't I?" and "I'll Be Seeing You" in Right This Way and "Get Out of Town" in Leave It to Me!.

== Death and legacy ==
As I'll Be Seeing You was becoming one of the homefront anthems of World War II, Drasin was killed while travelling as part of a United Service Organizations group that was on Pan American Boeing 314 flying boat Yankee Clipper which crashed while attempting to land on the Tagus River at Lisbon, Portugal, on 22 February 1943.

Drasin's story was partially told in the Jane Froman film With a Song in My Heart (1952). Froman suffered serious injuries in the same plane crash and later said that she had given Drasin her seat, which bothered Froman for the rest of her life.
