= China Clipper flight departure site =

Historic airstrip in Alameda, California, USA

Coordinates: 37.786772°N 122.302745°W

Site of the China Clipper flight departure
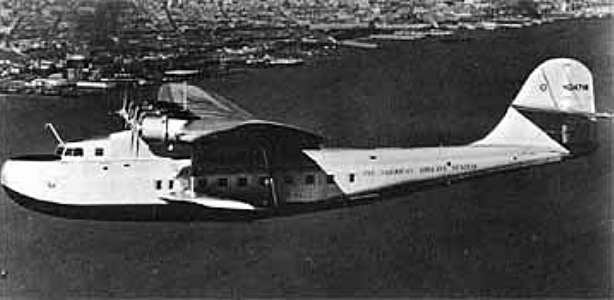
- Martin model 130 China Clipper class flying boat.

- Location within Alameda/Oakland
- Location: Alameda Naval Air Station, Alameda, California

California Historical Landmark
- Designated: November 5, 1985
- Reference no.: 968

The China Clipper flight departure site is listed as California Historical Landmark number 968. It is the site from which Pan American World Airways (Pan Am) initiated trans-Pacific airmail service on November 22, 1935. A flying boat named China Clipper made the first trip, and the publicity for that flight caused all flying boats on that air route to become popularly known as China Clippers. For a few years, this pioneering mail service captured the public imagination like the earlier Pony Express, and offered fast luxury travel like the later Concorde.

== Location ==
In 1927, wetlands on the eastern shore of San Francisco Bay were filled to form an airport with an east–west runway, three hangars, an administration building, and a yacht harbor. By 1930, United States Army Air Corps operations referred to the site as Benton Field. Pan Am used the yacht harbor as their California terminal for trans-Pacific flights beginning in 1935. On 1 June 1936, the city of Alameda, California, gave the airport to the United States government a few months before the Army discontinued operations from the field. Congressional appropriations for construction passed in 1938 and allowed naval air station operations to begin on 1 November 1940. Pan Am shifted their terminal to Treasure Island for the duration of the Golden Gate International Exposition in anticipation the island would become San Francisco's airport following the exposition. The United States Navy took over Treasure Island when the exposition ended, and San Francisco municipal airport was built at Mills Field; so the Pan Am flying boat Clippers used Navy terminal facilities for the remainder of their service lives. The site is now part of the Alameda Naval Air Station.

== Peacetime ==
The initial flight carried only air mail, but passenger service began in October 1936, with three Martin M-130 flying boats named Hawaii Clipper (NC14714), Philippine Clipper (NC14715), and China Clipper (NC14716). The route from San Francisco Bay, via Pearl Harbor, Midway Atoll, Wake Island, and Guam to Manila Bay required six days with approximately sixty hours of flying time at a cruising speed of 130 miles per hour. Each flying boat offered spacious accommodation for approximately a dozen passengers and typically carried two crews, with the second crew being trained by the first in oceanic navigation and flight procedures. One-way fare was approximately $700.

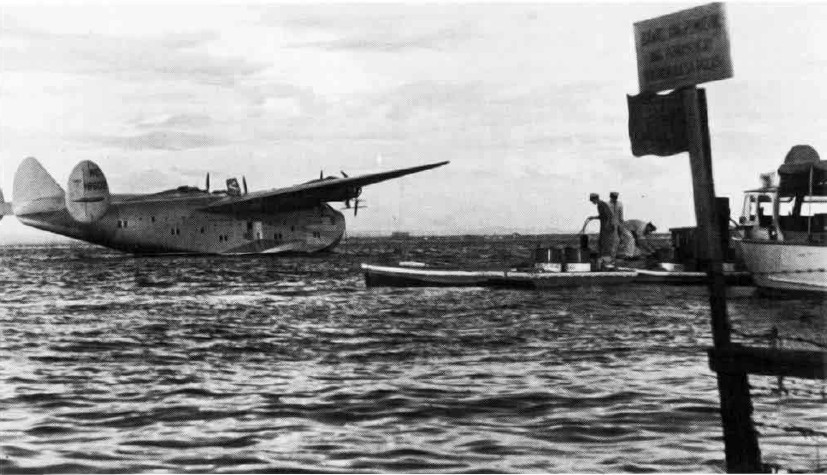
Boeing 314 on Manila Bay in 1940.

Pilot of the initial airmail flight, Ed Musick, died two years later when Sikorsky S-42 Samoan Clipper exploded over Samoa in January, 1938. Hawaii Clipper disappeared westbound from Guam to Manila in July, 1938. There were unsubstantiated rumors of Japanese involvement, similar to those arising from the disappearance of Amelia Earhart a year earlier. Earhart's navigator, Fred Noonan, had been navigator aboard China Clipper during the initial airmail flight. Boeing 314 flying boats Honolulu Clipper (NC18601) and California Clipper (NC18602) joined the surviving Martin M-130s in 1939, and Pacific Clipper (NC18609) and Anzac Clipper (NC18611) extended service to New Zealand and Australia in 1941.

== Wartime ==
Philippine Clipper returned to Wake when it received news of the attack on Pearl Harbor and was strafed floating on the lagoon when Japanese planes attacked Wake. Despite 96 bullet holes, the Clipper successfully returned to California. Pacific Clipper was in Auckland, New Zealand at the time of the attack, and its crew opted to return to the United States westbound rather than retrace its normal route. Its January 1942 arrival in New York marked the first circumnavigation of the globe by commercial aircraft.

The United States Navy assumed control of the Clippers in 1942, although Pan Am crews continued to fly the aircraft. Clippers flew between California and Hawaii and to Australia via Canton Island, Fiji, Nouméa, and New Zealand while the Western Pacific was controlled by Japan. Clippers would sometimes divert to Clear Lake Outlying Field when weather was unsuitable for landing on San Francisco Bay. Philippine Clipper crashed southwest of Ukiah, California, while carrying Pacific Fleet Submarine Force commander Robert English and his senior staff from Pearl Harbor to San Francisco during a January 1943 storm. It took search crews more than a week to locate the aircraft crash site on a mountain near Boonville, California. China Clipper, last of the three Martin M-130s, crashed in Trinidad in January 1945. Honolulu Clipper, the first of twelve Boeing 314s built, was still flying for the Navy in November 1945 when it successfully landed 650 miles east of Oahu after losing power in two engines. Aircraft mechanics from the escort carrier Manila Bay were unable to repair the engines at sea. The seaplane tender San Pablo attempted to tow the flying boat into port; but Honolulu Clipper was damaged in a collision with the tender and intentionally sunk by perforating the hull with 1200 20mm Oerlikon shells after salvage was deemed impractical.

== End of service ==
Surviving Clippers returned to civilian ownership after the war, but the era of the long-range commercial flying boat had passed. Large runways had been constructed around the world for heavy bombers, and military bomber technology was rapidly adapted for commercial airline service without the dangers and inconvenience of water landings.

== See also ==
- Alameda Mole
