= Martin 156 =

Flying boat aircraft intended for trans-Pacific service

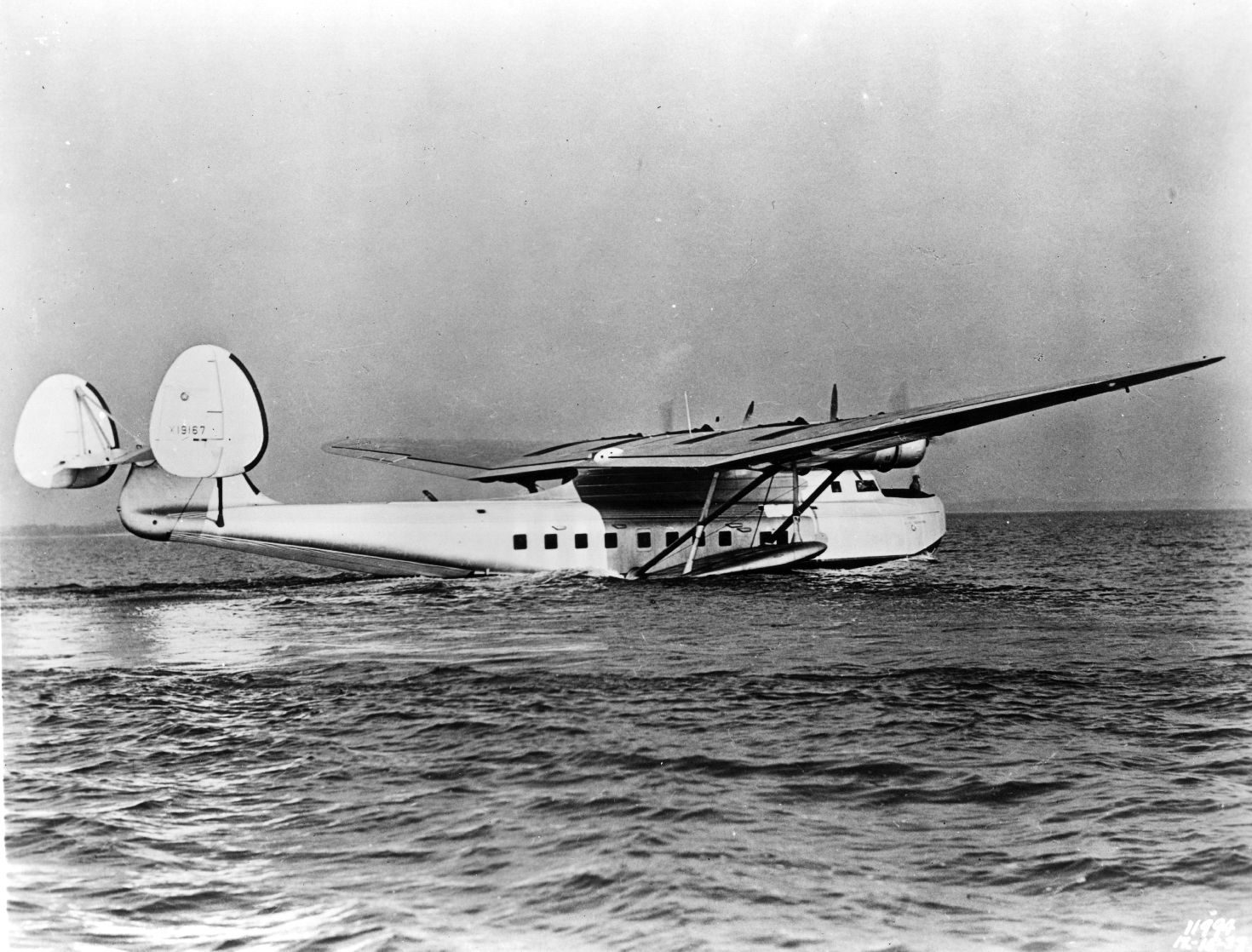
- Martin M-156 "Russian Clipper"

General information
- Type: Flying boat airliner
- Manufacturer: Glenn L. Martin Company
- Primary user: Aeroflot
- Number built: 1

History
- Introduction date: 1940
- First flight: 27 November 1937
- Retired: 1944

The Martin 156, referred to in the press variously as the "Russian Clipper", "Moscow Clipper", or "Soviet Clipper" was a large flying boat aircraft intended for trans-Pacific service. The single example of the M-156 was designed and built in response to a request from Pan American Airways to provide a longer-range replacement for the Martin M-130.

== Design and development ==
Martin delivered three Martin Ocean Transport Model-130s (M-130) to Pan Am in 1935 which were flown as the China Clipper, Philippine Clipper and Hawaii Clipper. Pan Am rejected the M-156 in preference to the Boeing 314 for its replacement.

Pan Am was seeking to expand its trans-Pacific air service between San Francisco and Hong Kong in 1937. This route had been pioneered by the Martin M-130 and Pan Am was in need of a larger aircraft. The San Francisco to Hawaii flight was 2,400 miles (3,900 km) and took 18 to 20 hours. Pan Am would have configured the M-156 as a 26-berth sleeper. The trans-Pacific flights flying Hawaii -Midway Islands - Wake Island - Guam - Manila - Hong Kong were less than half the California-to-Hawaii leg. With a lower fuel load requirement, the M-156 could carry additional passengers. The M-156 would have been converted to a 33- to 56-seat day-trip configuration. Pan Am and Matson Liners advertised an "Air-Sea Cruise" where Matson Liners carried passengers from San Francisco to Honolulu. Passengers would then transfer to Pan Am Clippers for westward flights to China and the Orient.

After Pan Am selected the Boeing 314, Martin negotiated a deal with the Soviet Union for this aircraft and the M-156 was never put into regular trans-Pacific service. The M-156 was sold to the Soviets and operated by Aeroflot on the Soviet Union's far-east routes under the designation PS-30.

Like the M-130, the M-156 was a four-engined, parasol wing design. While the M-156 retained the same length as its predecessor, its wingspan was increased by more than 27 ft (8.2 m) with the addition of flaps for increased control. The M-156 also differed from the M-130 by having a horizontal stabilizer mounted atop a pylon at the rear of the hull, with twin vertical stabilizers and twin rudders located atop the horizontal stabilizer.

Along with the increase in wing size, fuel capacity was expanded from the M-130's 3,165 gal (11,981 L) to a total of 4,260 gal (16,126 L) in the M-156/PS-30. Power for each of the four engines increased from 850 hp (630 kW) to 1,000 hp (750 kW) utilizing the more powerful Wright Cyclone G2 radials.

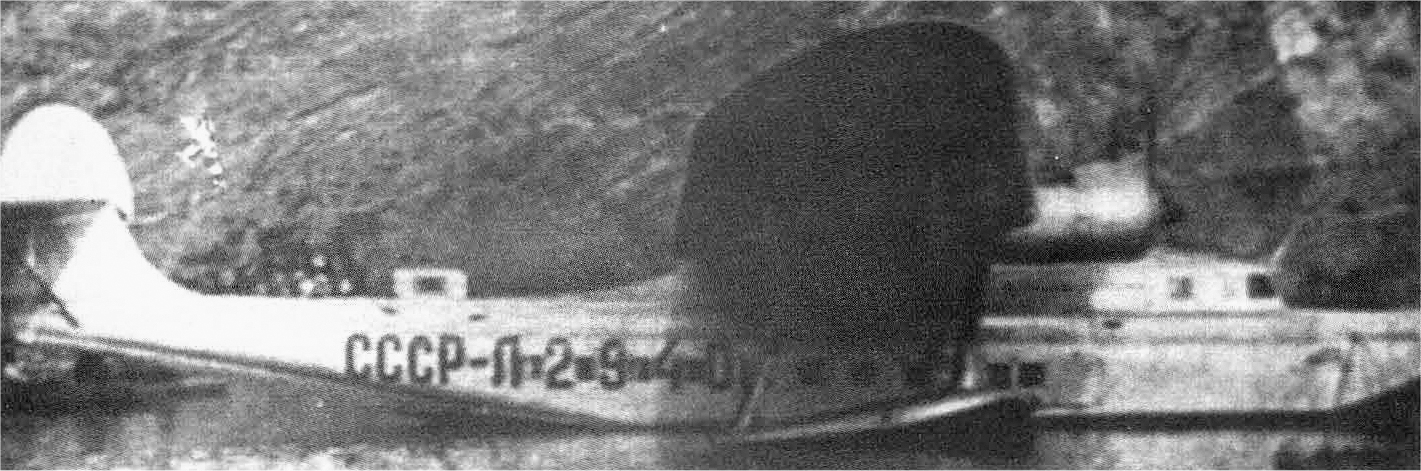
The M-156 in Aeroflot service

The Soviet government purchased the M-156 from Martin in 1937. The sale included a set of production plans, engineering specifications and manufacturing licenses as the Soviets intended to mass-produce this aircraft. The German invasion of the Soviet Union in 1941 negated these plans.

The single M-156/PS-30 was put into regular service in 1940 by Aeroflot and was utilized in the Soviet Far East along the Pacific coast. In this role, Aeroflot configured the aircraft to carry up to 70 passengers. It was flown by Aeroflot until 1944, at which time it was scrapped.

== Specifications (Martin 156C) ==
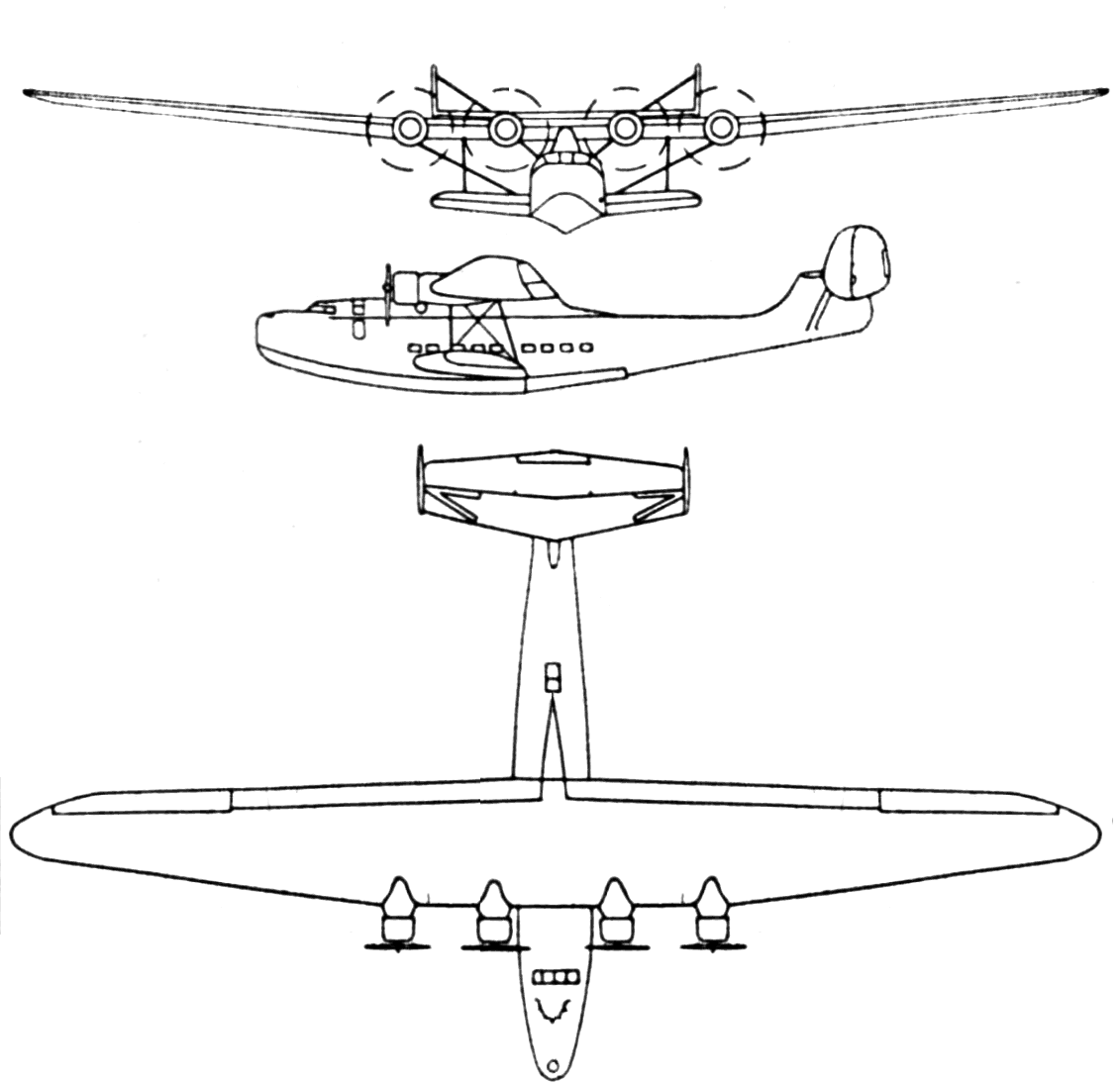
Martin 156 3-view drawing from l'Aerophile March 1938

Data from

General characteristics

- Capacity: 53 passengers (San Francisco - Hawaii)
  26 passengers (San Francisco - Hong Kong)
- Length: 92 ft 2 in (28.11 m)
- Wingspan: 157 ft 0 in (47.87 m)
- Height: 27 ft 2 in (8.29 m)
- Empty weight: 31,292 lb (14,194 kg)
- Gross weight: 60,708 lb (27,561 kg)
- Powerplant: 4 × Wright R-1820 Cyclone G2 radial piston engine, 1,000 hp (750 kW) each

Performance

- Maximum speed: 182 mph (293 km/h, 158 kn)
- Range: 3,000 mi (4,830 km, 2,600 nmi)

== See also ==
Related development

- Martin M-130

Aircraft of comparable role, configuration, and era

- Boeing 314 Clipper
- Dornier Do X
- Kawanishi H6K
- Latécoère 521
- Latécoère 631
- Short Empire
- Short S.26
- Sikorsky S-40
- Sikorsky S-42

Related lists

- List of aircraft of World War II
- List of flying boats and floatplanes
