= Charles A. Lockwood =

United States admiral

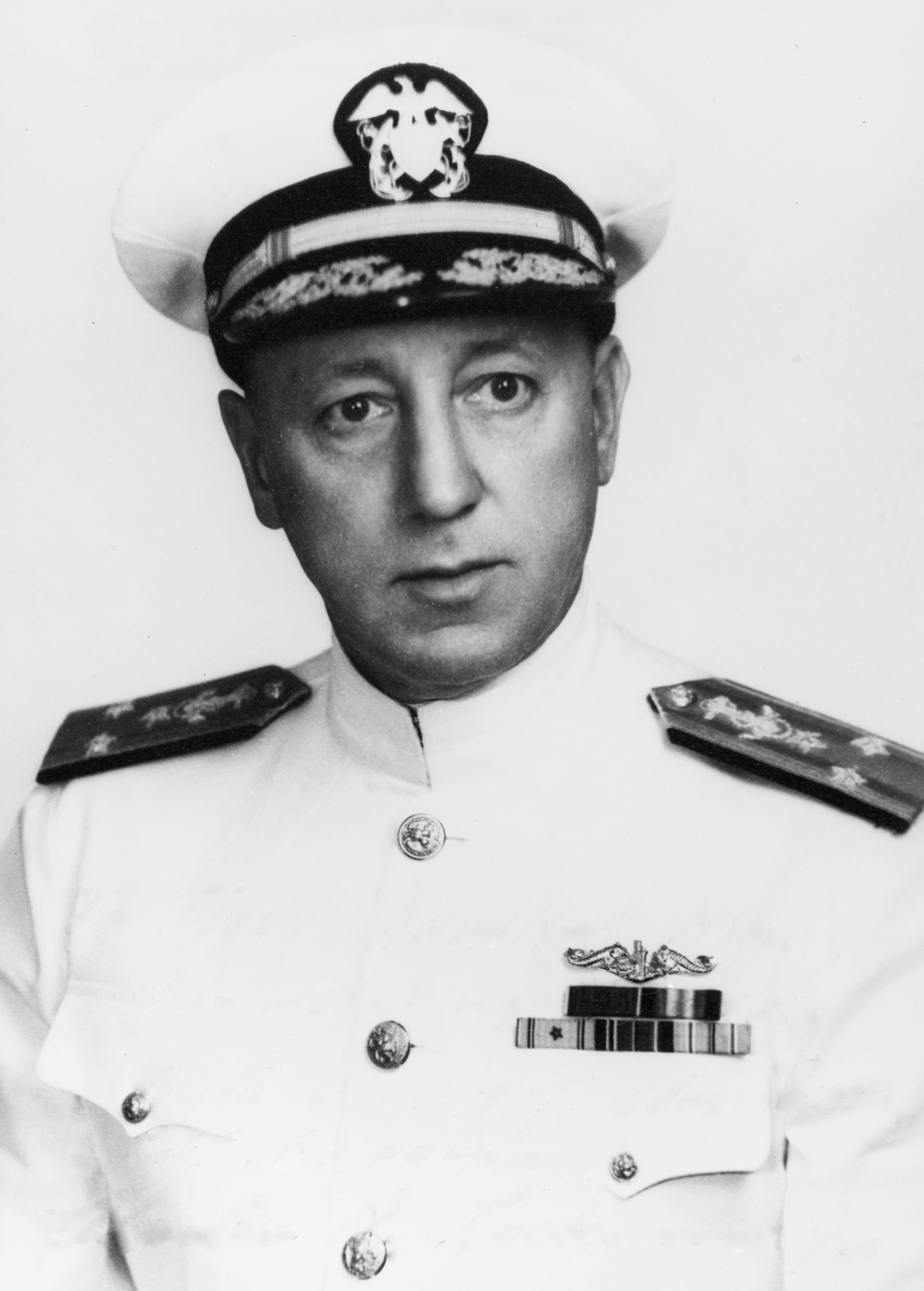
- Charles A. Lockwood
- Born: Charles Andrews Lockwood; May 6, 1890; Midland, Virginia, US
- Died: June 6, 1967 (aged 77)
- Burial place: Golden Gate National Cemetery
- Military career
- Allegiance: United States
- Branch: United States Navy
- Service years: 1912–1947 (35 years)
- Rank: Vice Admiral
- Nickname: "Uncle Charlie"
- Commands: Commander, Submarines, Pacific Fleet; Commander, Submarines, Southwest Pacific Area; Submarine Division 1 USS B-1 (SS-10); USS Adder (SS-3)
- Conflicts: World War I World War II
- Awards: Navy Distinguished Service Medal (3); Legion of Merit

Charles Andrews Lockwood (May 6, 1890 – June 6, 1967) was a vice-admiral and flag officer of the United States Navy. He is known in submarine history as the commander of Submarine Force Pacific Fleet during World War II. He devised tactics for the effective use of submarines, making the members and elements of "silent service" key players in the Pacific victory.

== Early life and career ==
Lockwood was born in Midland, Virginia, on May 6, 1890, graduated from Lamar High School (Missouri) in 1905, then graduated from the United States Naval Academy in the class of 1912. Following brief cruises aboard the battleships USS Mississippi and Arkansas, and a short tour as instructor in the Naval Training Station, Great Lakes, in September 1914 he reported to the tender USS Mohican for indoctrination in submarines.

== Submarine commander, World War I and postwar era ==
By December 1, 1914, he had his first submarine command, USS A-2, followed by USS B-1. American entry into World War I found him in command of Submarine Division 1, Asiatic Fleet.

From that time, with the exception of a tour on the Asiatic station where he commanded gunboats USS Quiros and Elcano on the Yangtze Patrol and the destroyer USS Smith Thompson, practically all his sea service was in and connected with submarines.

In addition to those listed above, Lockwood also served on the submarines USS G-1, N-5, UC-97 (ex-imperial German navy), R-25, S-14, and Bonita.

== World War II service ==
In June 1939, he became Chief of Staff to the Commander Submarine Force, U.S. Fleet, on the light cruiser USS Richmond. This important service was interrupted in February 1941 when he was sent to London as naval attaché and principal observer for submarines.

Following promotion to rear admiral in May 1942, he arrived in Perth, Western Australia as Commander, Submarines, Southwest Pacific (COMSUBSOWESPAC). Lockwood also acted as Commander Allied Naval Forces, Western Australia, until July 1942, overseeing the major bases at Fremantle and Exmouth, amongst others.

In February 1943, following the death of the COMSUBPAC, Rear Admiral Robert Henry English, in a plane crash in California, Lockwood was transferred to Pearl Harbor to become Commander, Submarines, Pacific Fleet (COMSUBPAC), in which capacity he served the rest of the war, being promoted to vice admiral in October 1943. Lockwood's strong leadership and devotion to his sailors won him the nickname "Uncle Charlie". Submarine patrols were long voyages and many times the crew finished up on "iron rations" of poor food as their food supplies ran out, so Lockwood made great strides in providing for rest and recuperation (R & R) for his sailors when they returned to port, such as two-week stays at the Royal Hawaiian Hotel, and crates of ice cream and leafy vegetables to greet returning submarine crews.

Lockwood oversaw the introduction into the Pacific Fleet of several hundred newly constructed fleet submarines from American shipyards, and the manning of them with newly trained officers and men. Older boats, like the S-class, were removed from combat and sent back to the U.S. for use in training or to be scrapped.

He oversaw the moving forward of the Pacific Fleet submarine bases from Pearl Harbor, Hawaii, and Australia to places like Saipan – where a submarine tender was stationed for a period of time – Guam, the Admiralty Islands, and Subic Bay in the Philippines. This reduced the very long ocean voyages for American submarines, and steadily tightened the noose on Imperial Japanese supply lines, especially in the East China Sea and the South China Sea.

Importantly, Lockwood cleaned out the "dead wood", replacing timid and unproductive submarine skippers with (often) younger and more aggressive officers. During the early stages of the Pacific War, U.S. skippers were relatively complacent and docile, compared to their German counterparts who understood the "life and death" urgency in the Atlantic. There was plenty of room for error and cautious judgment since the Japanese did not take the U.S. submarine threat seriously.

=== Torpedo Problems ===
He pushed the Navy's Bureau of Ships and Bureau of Ordnance to provide his men with the most effective submarines and torpedoes possible. He oversaw the tests that proved the unreliability of U.S. torpedoes, which at the time were often running too deep or failing to detonate, and prompted the improvements that made them the highly effective weapons they became in 1944 and 1945. In fighting for better torpedoes, Lockwood had to fight the Mark 14 torpedo and Mark 6 exploder supporter Rear Admiral Ralph Waldo Christie, who had been involved in the development of these weapon systems in the 1920s and 1930s, and who was convinced that their reported problems were caused by poor maintenance and errors on the part of the captain and crew. During a tense Washington conference with fellow admirals in early 1943, he demanded that, "If the Bureau of Ordnance can't provide us with torpedoes that will hit and explode, or with a gun larger than a peashooter, then for God's sake get the Bureau of Ships to design a boathook with which we can rip the plates off the target's sides."

In 1942 and early 1943, U.S. submarines proved little threat to Japanese warships and merchant ships alike. As a result of Lockwood's initiatives, the "silent service" suddenly began racking up many kills, including key enemy warships. Most importantly, U.S. submarines were responsible for severing Japan's shipping routes to their colonies in Southeast Asia, by sinking close to half of their merchant ships. The Imperial Japanese Navy was caught off guard and never recovered.

Lockwood's wartime awards were the Navy Distinguished Service Medal three times, and the Legion of Merit award.

== Post-war career and retirement ==
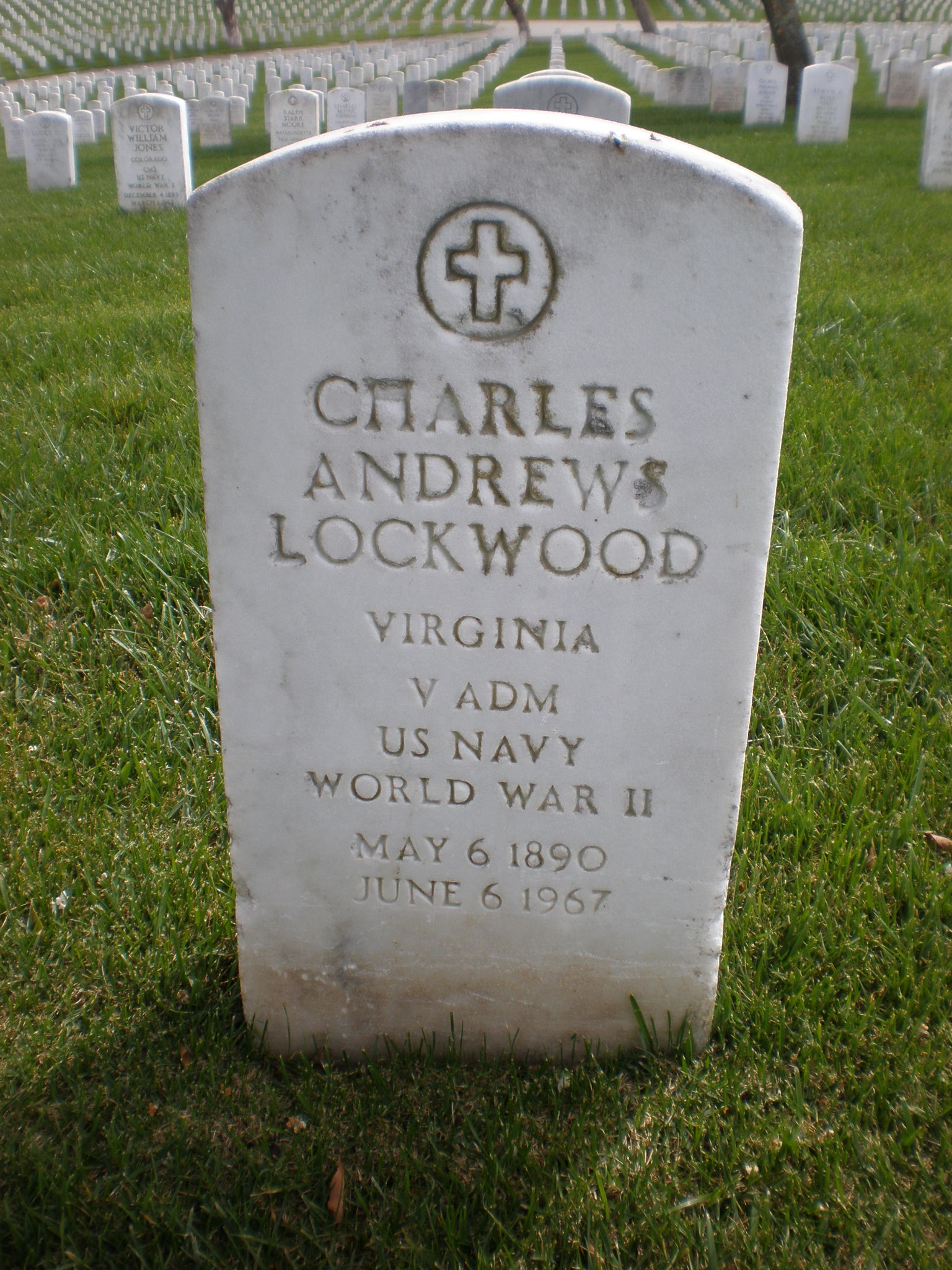
Lockwood's headstone at Golden Gate National Cemetery

After the war, Lockwood served as the Naval Inspector General until his retirement in June 1947. In retirement at Los Gatos, California, he authored and contributed to several best-selling books on naval history and submarine operations, including Tragedy at Honda, Sink-Em All, Through Hell and Deep Water, Hell at 50 Fathoms, Zoomies, Subs and Zeros, Hellcats of the Sea, Battles of the Philippine Sea, and Down to The Sea in Subs: My Life in the U.S. Navy.

He served as the technical advisor for the 1951 film Operation Pacific starring John Wayne. This film is considered a classic depicting submarine warfare. He was technical advisor for the 1957 film Hellcats of the Navy (a fictionalized version of his book Hellcats of the Sea), which starred Ronald Reagan and Nancy Davis. He also served as technical advisor to the 1959 films On the Beach and Up Periscope.

In one of his book-promotion speeches following the war, Lockwood mentioned that he was an avid deer hunter. After the speech, he was approached by Ralph T. Duncan, a pharmacist living in Los Gatos, California. Duncan invited Lockwood to be his guest that year at Jake's Opening Hunting Club, near Boonville, California. They became fast friends. After Lockwood had been deer and quail hunting at the club for several years as Duncan's guest, Lockwood learned of an amazing coincidence: Lockwood's predecessor as submarine fleet commander, Robert Henry English, had died on the same hunting club property in the crash of the Philippine Clipper flying boat. Upon Admiral English's death, Lockwood had been given command of the Pacific submarine fleet.

Lockwood died on June 6, 1967. He is buried at Golden Gate National Cemetery in San Bruno, California, alongside his wife and Admirals Chester Nimitz, Raymond Spruance, and Richmond Kelly Turner, an arrangement made by all of them while living. His wife, Phyllis Natalie Irwin, was a daughter of Rear Admiral Noble E. Irwin.

== Namesake ==
The frigate USS Lockwood (FF-1064) was named in his honor.

The Naval Submarine League presents an annual Vice Admiral Charles A. Lockwood Award for Submarine Professional Excellence which recognizes individuals (Active or Reserve) for achievement, contribution, specific action or consistent performance, which best exemplifies the traditional spirit embodied in the Submarine Force.

== Awards and decorations ==

Navy Distinguished Service Medal with two gold award stars
| Legion of Merit | World War I Victory Medal | Yangtze Service Medal |
| American Defense Service Medal with fleet clasp (not shown) | Asiatic-Pacific Campaign Medal | World War II Victory Medal |
