= Naval Air Station Alameda =

Former US Naval Air Station in Alameda, California

- Nimitz Field
- Alameda, California in the United States
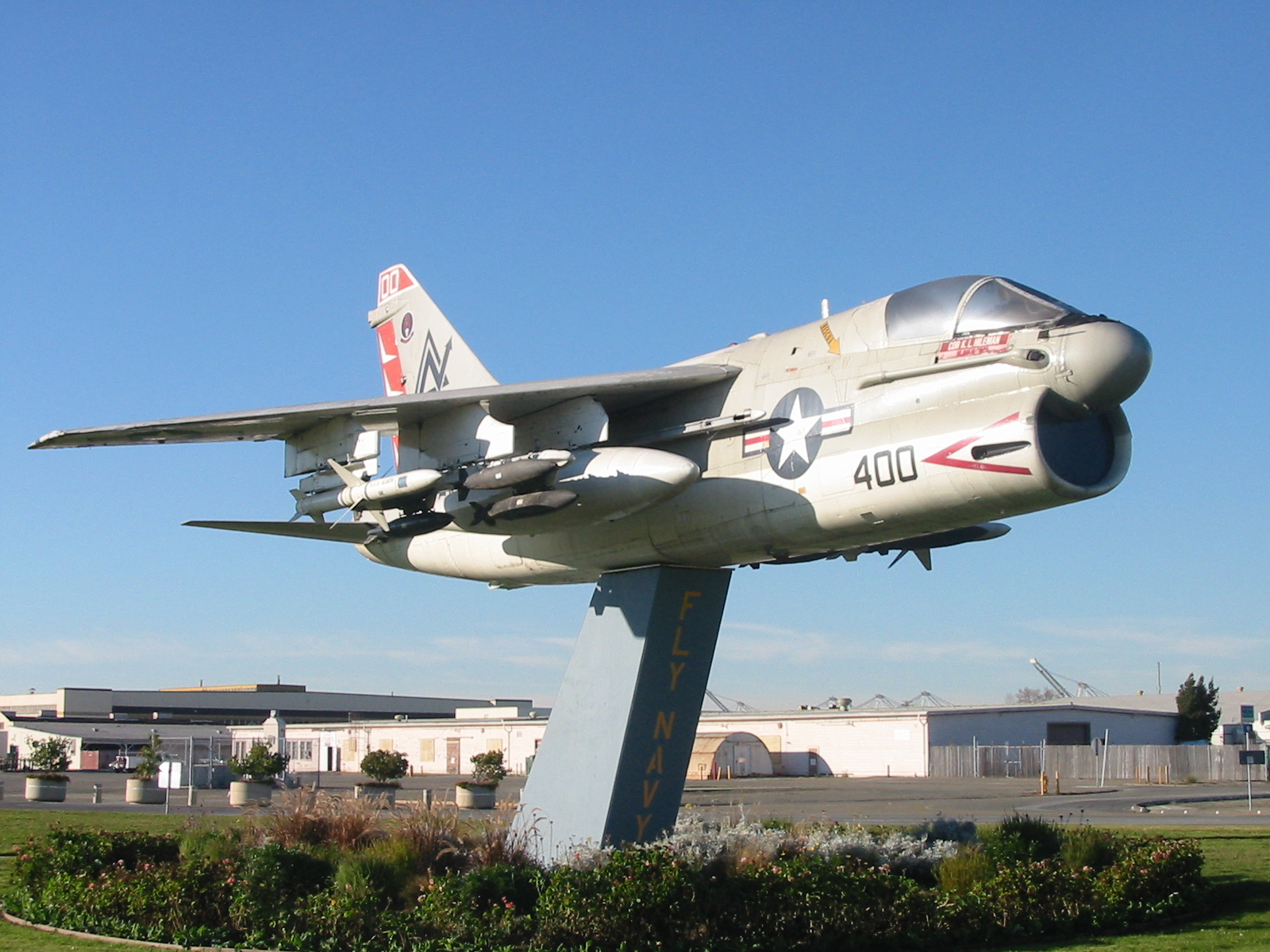
- An A-7 Corsair II gate guardian at the former NAS Alameda in 2006

Site information
- Type: Naval air station
- Owner: Department of Defense
- Operator: U.S. Navy
- Condition: Closed

Location
- Location in the San Francisco Bay Area Location in the United States
- Coordinates: 37°47′10″N 122°19′07″W

Site history
- Built: 1927 (as Alameda Airport)
- In use: 1940–1997
- Fate: Transferred to City of Alameda for redevelopment (Alameda Point)

Airfield information
- Identifiers: IATA: NGZ, ICAO: KNGZ, WMO: 745060
Runways
Direction	Length and surface
13/31	2,438 metres (7,999 ft) Asphalt
07/25	2,195 metres (7,201 ft) Asphalt

U.S. National Register of Historic Places

U.S. Historic district
- Designated: 23 January 2013
- Reference no.: 12001191
- Period: 1900–
- Area of significance: Architecture; Community Planning and Development; Landscape Architecture; Military

California Historical Landmark
- Official name: Site of the China Clipper flight departure
- Designated: 5 November 1985
- Reference no.: 968

Naval Air Station Alameda (NAS Alameda) was a United States Navy Naval Air Station mostly in Alameda, California, with a slight portion of it within San Francisco proper, on San Francisco Bay.

NAS Alameda had two runways: 13–31 measuring 8,000 ft × 200 ft (2,438 m × 61 m) and 07-25 measuring 7,200 ft × 200 ft (2,195 m × 61 m). Two helicopter pads and a control tower were also part of the facilities.

== History ==
In 1927, wetlands at the west end of Alameda Island on the east shore of San Francisco Bay were filled to form an airport (Alameda Airport) with an east–west runway, three hangars, an administration building, and a yacht harbor. The airport site included the Alameda Terminal of the First transcontinental railroad (California Historical Landmark #440). By 1930, United States Army Air Corps operations referred to the site as Benton Field. Pan American World Airways used the yacht harbor as the California terminal for China Clipper trans-Pacific flights beginning on November 22, 1935. The China Clipper terminal is designated California Historical Landmark #968.

On 1 June 1936, the city of Alameda, California, ceded the airport to the United States government a few months before the Army discontinued operations from the field. Pan American World Airways shifted its terminal to Treasure Island in 1939 for the Golden Gate International Exposition. Congressional appropriations passed in 1938 for construction of naval air station facilities for two carrier air wings, five seaplane squadrons and two utility squadrons. Appropriations were increased in 1940 for construction of two seaplane hangars and an aircraft carrier berthing pier. Naval operations began on 1 November 1940. – 1997 Fleet Air Wing 8 began patrol and scouting missions following the attack on Pearl Harbor. In April 1942, USS Hornet loaded at Alameda the 16 B-25 aircraft that would take part in the Doolittle Raid on Japan. From August through December 1944, future US President Richard Nixon was assigned to Fleet Air Wing 8 at Naval Air Station Alameda, California.

Air support training unit No. 2 at Alameda included the fleet radar operator's school, Link celestial navigation trainer school, and aviation storekeeper school. As World War II continued, Alameda became headquarters for a system of auxiliary airfields:

- Naval Auxiliary Air Station Arcata
- Clear Lake Outlying Field
- Concord Outlying Field
- Crescent City Outlying Field
- Crows Landing Naval Auxiliary Air Station
- Fallon Auxiliary Airfield
- Half Moon Bay Outlying Field
- Hollister Auxiliary Airfield
- King City Auxiliary Airfield
- Livermore Auxiliary Airfield
- Monterey Auxiliary Airfield
- Oakland Auxiliary Airfield
- Paso Robles Outlying Field
- San Francisco Auxiliary Airfield
- San Luis Obispo Outlying Field
- Santa Rosa Outlying Field
- Treasure Island Auxiliary Airfield
- Tulare Lake Outlying Field
- Naval Auxiliary Air Station Vernalis
- Watsonville Auxiliary Airfield

Alameda remained an important naval base through the Cold War. From 1949 to 1953, the Navy based the Lockheed R6V Constitution—the largest airplane ever listed on the Navy inventory—at NAS Alameda. The two prototypes regularly flew between nearby NAS Moffett Field and Pearl Harbor, Hawaii.

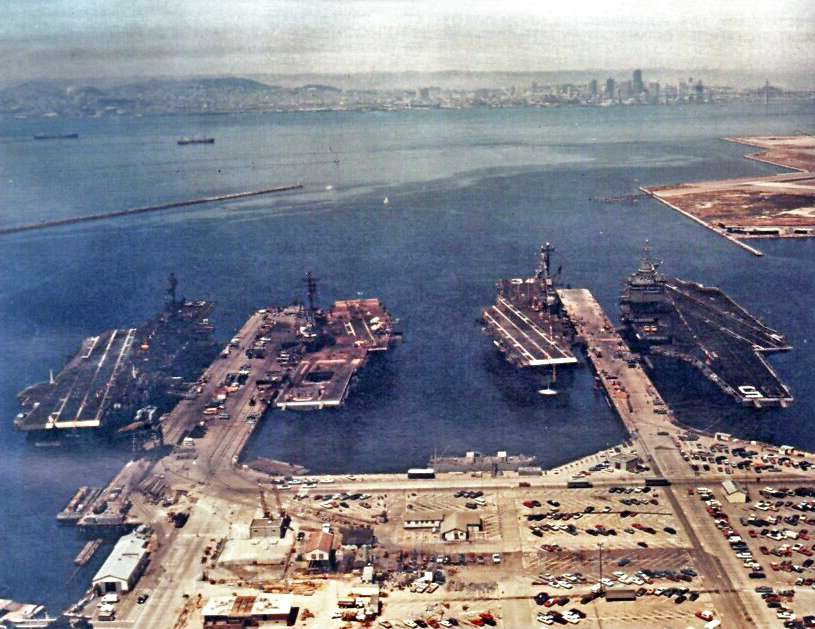
Carriers Coral Sea, Hancock, Oriskany and Enterprise at Alameda, in 1974

During the Vietnam War portion of the Cold War and its later post-Vietnam era, the base was homeport to the aircraft carriers Coral Sea, Hancock, Oriskany, Enterprise, Ranger, Carl Vinson and Abraham Lincoln. NAS Alameda also housed a major aircraft overhaul facility employing thousand of civilian employees that was known as Naval Air Rework Facility (NARF) Alameda and later renamed Naval Aviation Depot (NADEP) Alameda.

The base was also the focus for northern California Naval Air Reserve operations after 1961, hosting various Reserve Force Squadrons attached to Carrier Air Wing Reserve 30 (CVWR-30), also known as CAG-30, equipped with aircraft such as the KA-3 Skywarrior...later replaced by the A-6 Intruder, and the A-4 Skyhawk...later replaced by A-7 Corsair II. Other Naval Air Reserve Force Squadrons external to CVWR-30 flew the Sikorsky H-34 Sea Horse...later replaced by the SH-3 Sea King, the CH-53 Sea Stallion, and MH-53E Sea Dragon. Another land-based squadron under Fleet Logistics Support Wing flew the C-9 Skytrain II. In the 1960s, a Naval Air Reserve unit also flew the P-2 Neptune before relocating to nearby NAS Moffett Field, transitioning to the P-3 Orion, and being established as Reserve patrol squadron in 1970. Runways were lengthened for jet aircraft, and the airfield was renamed Nimitz Field in 1967 following the death of Fleet Admiral Chester W. Nimitz.

The base was closed in 1997 pursuant to Base Realignment and Closure action. Its runways were also closed and the airfield was not reutilized as a civilian airport.

== Post-closure uses ==
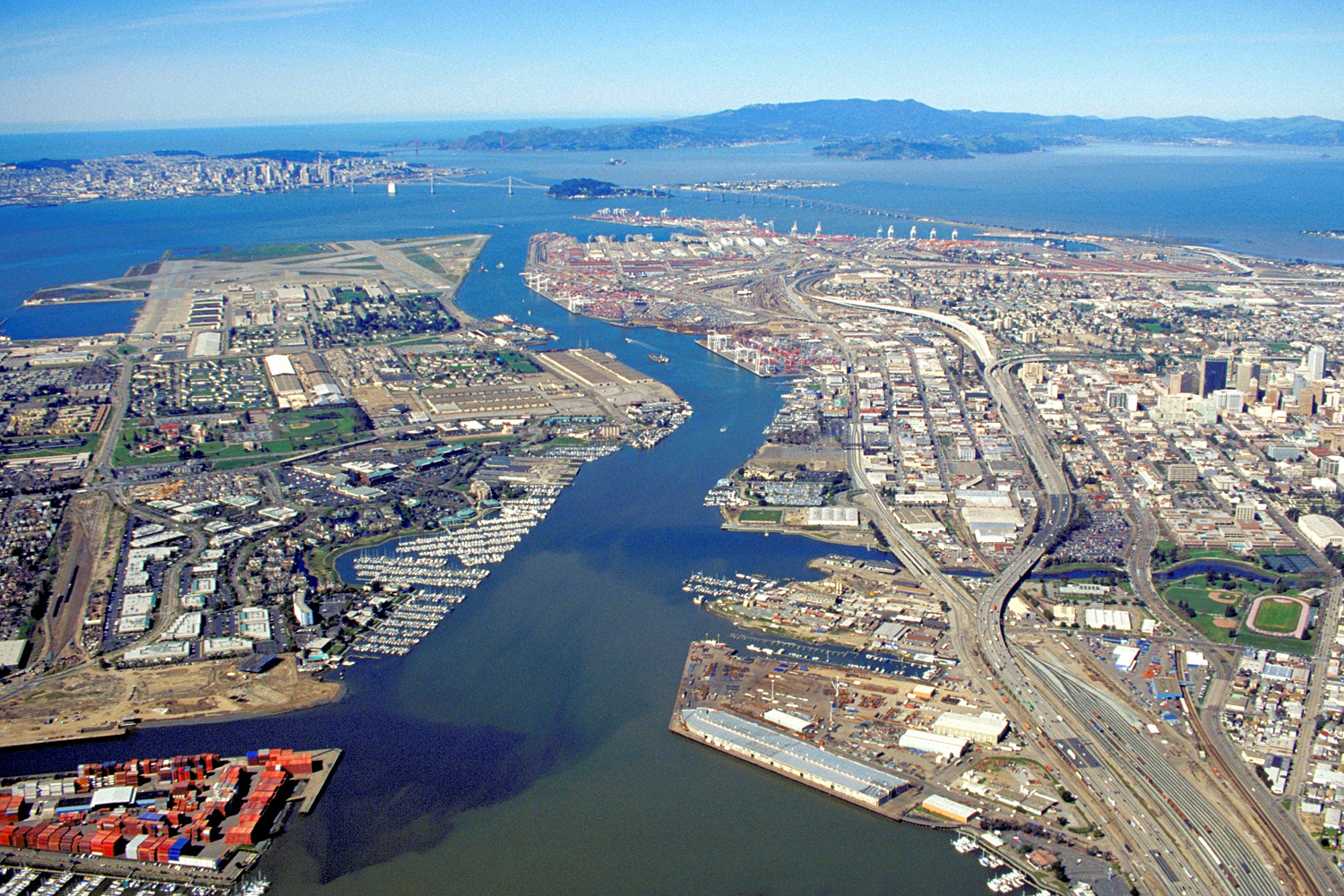
The runways and remainder of the Alameda Naval Air Station can be seen at the end of Alameda Island in this aerial view of the port of Oakland, California.

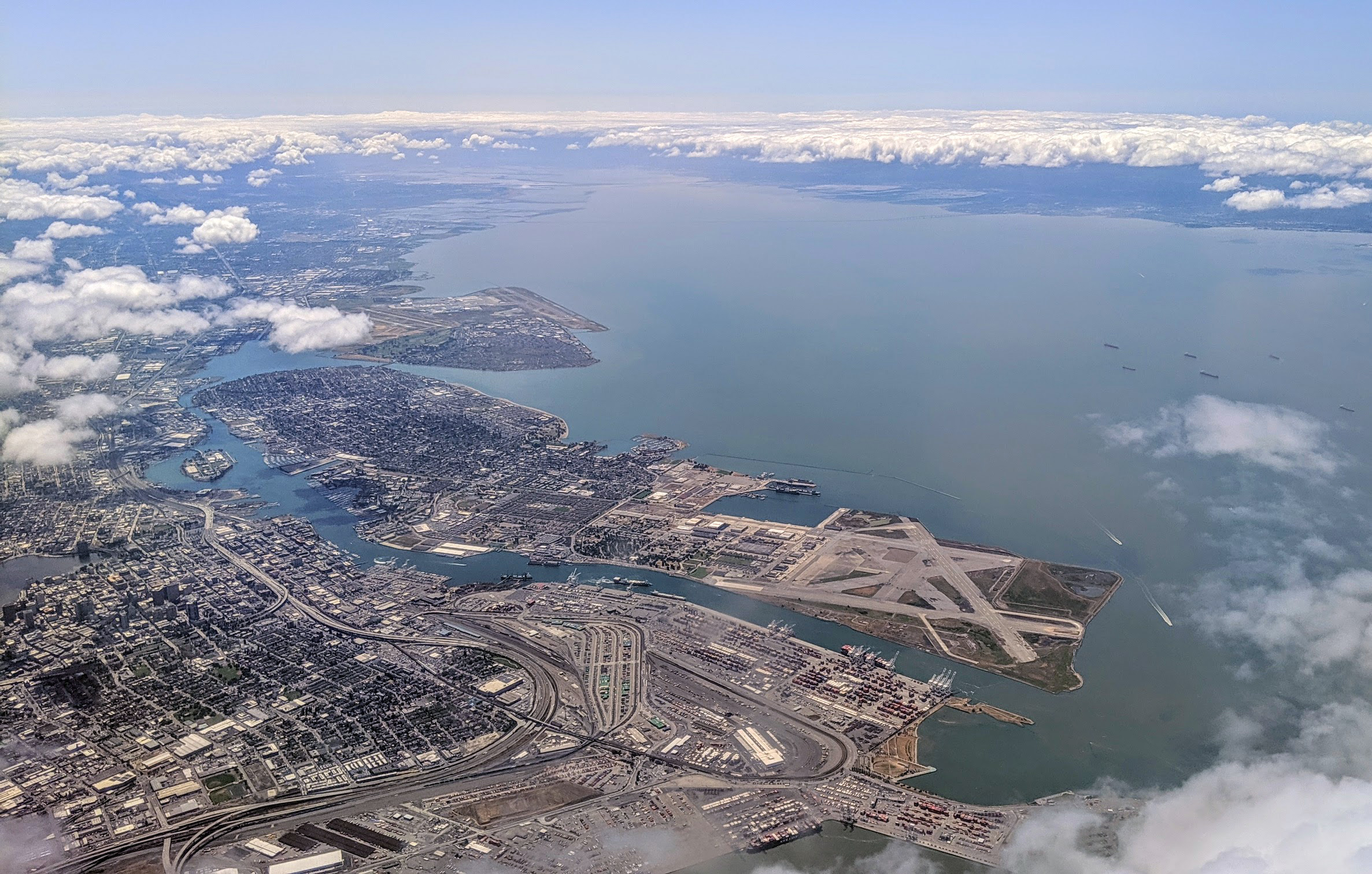
Aerial view with Port of Oakland and the bay

After the base closed on 25 April 1997, USS Hornet was given to the former air station to be used as a museum ship, the USS Hornet Museum.

The television series MythBusters often conducted vehicle-based experiments on the grounds of the station (referred to on-air as the "Alameda Runway"), due to the extensive safety zone that could be set up around the test site. For the same reason, this location has been used as a checkpoint for the Bullrun rally race; the lengthy airstrip allowed for the staging of a challenge involving chasing a semi-trailer.

A two-mile freeway loop was constructed on the base for the filming of a lengthy car chase sequence for the movie The Matrix Reloaded. The loop cost over $1.5 million to construct and was used solely for shooting the film's chase scenes (a seven-week-long process) before it was demolished. The route is still visible on some aerial photography on the former Runway 07/25 and Runway 13/31.

Since 2000, the city of Alameda has been planning the redevelopment of the former Naval Air Station, now known as Alameda Point. Complicating the redevelopment are several constraints: land-use constraints consisting of Tidelands Trust; soil and groundwater contamination; wildlife refuge buffer requirements; geotechnical issues; 100-year flood plans; institutional and contractual constraints with Alameda Measure A, the Alameda Naval Air Station Historic District and existing residents and leases.

In August 2001, Alameda selected Alameda Point Community Partners (APCP) as the master developer for the property. APCP was a partnership of financier Morgan Stanley, Shea Homes of Livermore, Centex Homes of Dallas and the Industrial Realty Group. The development was estimated to cost $2 billion and take 15 years to complete. Alameda Point Community Partners was selected over Catellus and Harbor Bay/Lennar, and signed a two-year exclusive negotiating contract as the property's master developer.

By 2005, only Shea Homes and Centex Homes were working on redevelopment plans, and a Preliminary Development Concept called for building 1,700 homes on the site. In July 2006, the City of Alameda and the Navy agreed to a $108 million purchase deal. In September 2006, APCP decided that it would not move forward with the development plan identified in the Preliminary Development Concept and withdrew from the project.

In May 2007, the city selected SunCal Companies as the master developer from a field of five applicant firms that sought to develop 770 acres (310 ha). In July 2007, the city and SunCal entered into an exclusive negotiating agreement as SunCal began to gather community input and develop preliminary plans.

In August 2010, the Alameda City Council voted to terminate the exclusive negotiating agreement with SunCal and halt its proposal for the former Naval Air Station. Various reasons were cited in the staff report leading up to the vote, including the developer- and city-initiated ballot measure related to the project that was defeated in February 2010 by a margin of 85%.

== Superfund cleanup site ==
NAS Alameda was listed as a Superfund cleanup site on 22 July 1999. 25 locations on the base were identified as needing remediation. The largest of the individual locations is the West Beach Landfill which occupies approximately 110 acres (44.5 ha) in the southwestern corner of the base. Tests of the landfill indicate polychlorinated biphenyl (PCB) contamination.

== See also ==
- Alameda Naval Hospital
- American Theater (1939–1945)
- California during World War II
- List of airports in the San Francisco Bay Area
- List of United States Navy airfields
- San Francisco Naval Shipyard
- United States home front during World War II
- National Register of Historic Places in Alameda County, California

== Notes ==
- USS Hornet history
