= USS Lockwood =

US Navy frigate

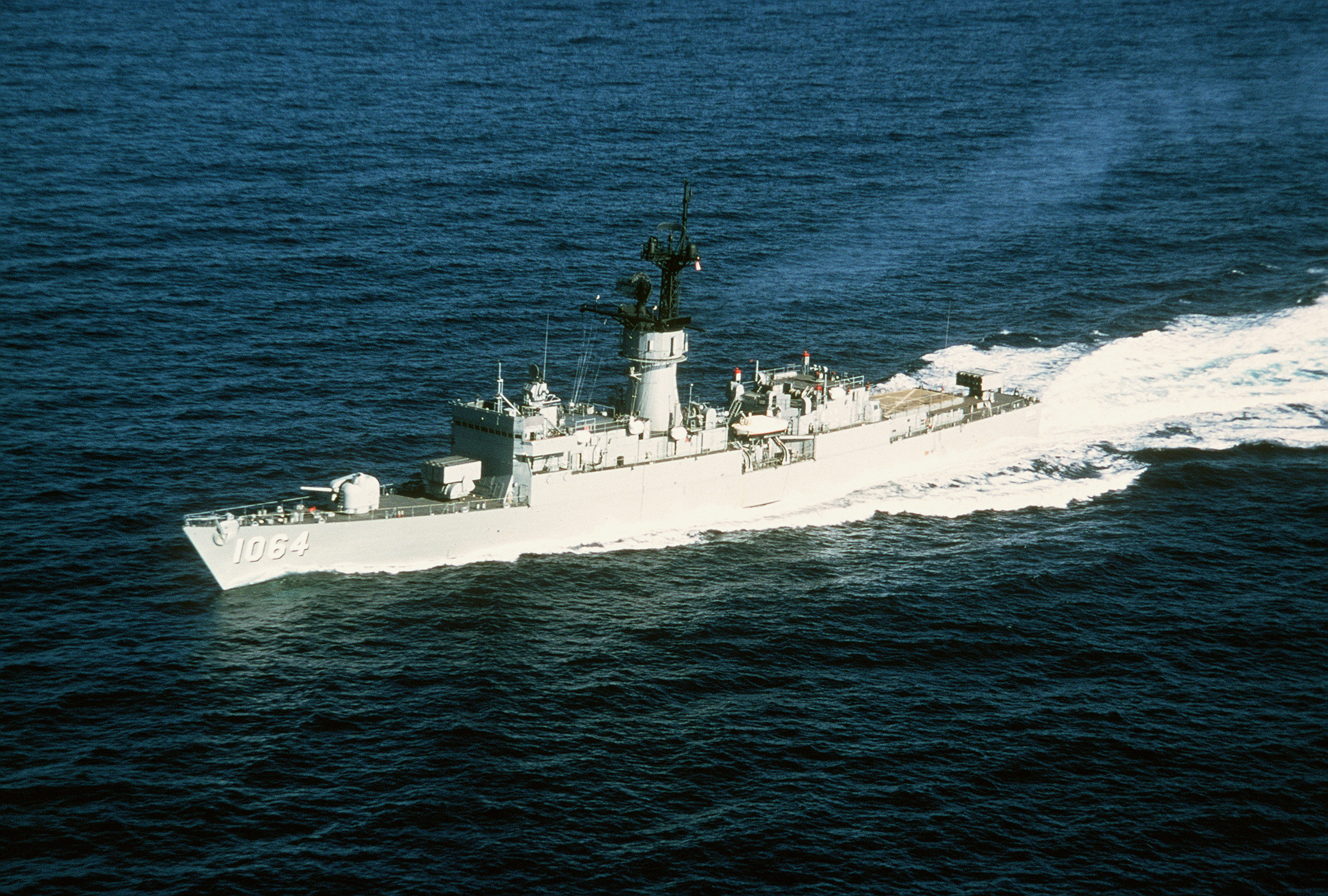
- USS Lockwood (FF-1064)

History

United States
- Name: Lockwood
- Namesake: Charles A. Lockwood
- Ordered: 22 July 1964
- Builder: Todd Pacific Shipyards, Seattle, Washington
- Laid down: 3 November 1967
- Launched: 5 September 1968
- Acquired: 1 December 1970
- Commissioned: 5 December 1970
- Decommissioned: 27 September 1993
- Stricken: 27 September 1993
- Motto: Secure Against the Waves
- Fate: Scrapped, 4 August 2000

General characteristics
- Class & type: Knox-class frigate
- Displacement: 3,192 tons (4,154 full load)
- Length: 438 ft (134 m)
- Beam: 46 ft 9 in (14.25 m)
- Draft: 24 ft 9 in (7.54 m)
- Propulsion: 2 × CE 1200psi boilers; 1 Westinghouse geared turbine; 1 shaft, 35,000 shp (26,000 kW)
- Speed: over 27 knots (31 mph; 50 km/h)
- Range: 4,500 nautical miles (8,330 km) at 20 knots (23 mph; 37 km/h)
- Complement: 18 officers, 267 enlisted
- Sensors & processing systems: AN/SPS-40 Air Search Radar; AN/SPS-67 Surface Search Radar; AN/SQS-26CX Sonar; AN/SQQ-17A(V)2 sonobuoy system; AN/SQR-18 Towed array sonar system; AN/SQS-35 IVDS; Mk68 Gun Fire Control System
- Electronic warfare & decoys: AN/SLQ-32 Electronics Warfare System
- Armament: one Mk-16 8 cell missile launcher for RUR-5 ASROC and Harpoon missiles; one Mk-42 5-inch/54 caliber gun; Mark 46 torpedoes from four single tube launchers); one Mk-25 BPDMS launcher for Sea Sparrow missiles, later replaced by one Phalanx CIWS
- Aircraft carried: one SH-2 Seasprite (LAMPS I) helicopter

USS Lockwood (FF-1064) was the 13th Knox-class destroyer escort, redesignated a frigate in 1975. She was named for Charles A. Lockwood.

== Design and description ==
The Knox-class design was derived from the Brooke-class frigate modified to extend range and without a long-range missile system. The ships had an overall length of 438 feet (133.5 m), a beam of 47 feet (14.3 m) and a draft of 25 feet (7.6 m). They displaced 4,066 long tons (4,131 t) at full load. Their crew consisted of 13 officers and 211 enlisted men.

The ships were equipped with one Westinghouse geared steam turbine that drove the single propeller shaft. The turbine was designed to produce 35,000 shaft horsepower (26,000 kW), using steam provided by 2 C-E boilers, to reach the designed speed of 27 knots (50 km/h; 31 mph). The Knox class had a range of 4,500 nautical miles (8,300 km; 5,200 mi) at a speed of 20 knots (37 km/h; 23 mph).

The Knox-class ships were armed with a 5"/54 caliber Mark 42 gun forward and a single 3-inch/50-caliber gun aft. They mounted an eight-round RUR-5 ASROC launcher between the 5-inch (127 mm) gun and the bridge. Close-range anti-submarine defense was provided by two twin 12.75-inch (324 mm) Mk 32 torpedo tubes. The ships were equipped with a torpedo-carrying DASH drone helicopter; its telescoping hangar and landing pad were positioned amidships aft of the mack. Beginning in the 1970s, the DASH was replaced by a SH-2 Seasprite LAMPS I helicopter and the hangar and landing deck were accordingly enlarged. Most ships also had the 3-inch (76 mm) gun replaced by an eight-cell BPDMS missile launcher in the early 1970s.

== Construction and career ==
She was constructed by Todd Pacific Shipyards, Seattle, Washington, laid down 3 November 1967, launched 5 September 1968 and delivered 1 December 1970. Lockwood was commissioned 5 December 1970 as destroyer escort (DE-1064).

In May 1975 USS Lockwood was reassigned to forward deployed Destroyer Squadron 15, changing her homeport to Yokosuka, Japan to be part of the USS Midway battle group. On 30 June 1975 USS Lockwood was reclassified as a frigate (FF-1064).

From 27 September - 21 December 1977 USS Lockwood sailed with the Midway battle group. During the cruise USS Lockwood participated in exercise MIDLINK-77 with the Iranian Navy, and visited a number of ports including Bandar Abbas, Iran; Bunbury, Western Australia; and Singapore.

On 1 November 1978 USS Lockwood, along with her sister ship Kirk and oiler Ashtabula arrived in Perth/Fremantle, Western Australia, for an R&R visit. They departed on 11 November.

From 24 February to 5 June 1981 USS Lockwood sailed with the Midway battle group. during the cruise USS Lockwood again visited Bunbury, Western Australia, from 6–11 May 1981.

In July 1988, USS Lockwood changed home port to Naval Station Long Beach, California, as part of “Destroyer Squadron 9” where she would remain until her decommissioning on 30 September 1993, struck from the NVR after 22.8 years of service

A contract was awarded on 29 September 1999 for $3.7 million to the Ship Dismantling & Recycling Joint Venture, San Francisco, California for towing/scrapping and the vessel was disposed of by recycling on 4 August 2000.

Its bell currently resides with VAQ-209 which is currently on display in Hangar 11, Naval Air Station Whidbey Island in Washington state.
