= Alameda Point, Alameda, California =

Land on the location of Naval Air Station Alameda

Coordinates: 37.785775°N 122.31843°W

Alameda Point is the name given to the lands of the former Naval Air Station Alameda in the City of Alameda, California. Alameda Point consists of 1,560 acres (6.3 km^{2}) of land area at the western end of the island of Alameda. Most of the land was reclaimed from the San Francisco Bay.

NAS Alameda was identified for closure under the Base Realignment and Closure (BRAC) Program in 1993, and ceased operation in April 1997. An agreement between the Navy and the City of Alameda for transferring the land to the city for future development was reached in 2006. One of the larger issues between the Navy and the city has been paying the costs of the environmental cleanup required. Prior to the transfer, some of the facilities of the former base have been leased to private tenants and the City of Alameda. The Alameda Point beach is one of the cleanest in the state. Alameda Point has a number of film sites. Beginning in late 2006 the MythBusters began to test various experiments on the former runway while in 2009, NBC's Trauma staged a plane crash.

== Redevelopment ==
In August 2001, Alameda Point Community Partners (APCP) was selected by the City, who signed a two-year exclusive negotiating contract as Alameda Point's master developer. APCP was a partnership of finance company Morgan Stanley, and realty companies Shea Homes of Livermore, Centex Homes of Dallas, and the Industrial Realty Group, and was selected over developers Catellus and Harbor Bay/Lennar. The development was estimated to cost US$2 billion and take 15 years to complete.

By 2005, only Shea Homes and Centex Homes were working on redevelopment plans, and a Preliminary Development Concept called for building 1,700 homes on the site. In July 2006, the City of Alameda and the Navy agreed to a $108 million purchase deal. In September 2006, APCP decided that it would not move forward with the development plan and withdrew from the project.

In May 2007, the City selected SunCal Companies as the master developer to redevelop 770 acres. In July 2007, the City and SunCal entered into an exclusive negotiating agreement as SunCal began to gather community input and develop preliminary plans.

In August 2010, the City Council voted unanimously to terminate the exclusive negotiating agreement with SunCal and halt its proposal for the former Naval Air Station. Various reasons were cited in the staff report leading up to the vote, including a developer- and city-initiated ballot measure related to the project that was defeated in February 2010 by a margin of 85%. SunCal had incurred over $17 million in expenses over the three years it worked on developing plans for the property.

== Alameda Point Site A ==
Ground breaking began in May 2018 on Phase 1 of Site A, a 68-acre (28 ha) parcel on the former Naval Air Station Alameda by the City of Alameda, California and its private partner, Alameda Point Partners LLC as a part of the $1-billion mixed-use, transit-oriented waterfront development. APP is now led by Trammell Crow Residential and includes srmERNST Development, Madison Marquette, Cypress Equity Investments and affordable housing non-profit Eden Housing. Phase 1 will create 637 housing units, including 130 units of affordable housing developed by Eden Housing, Inc. and designed by KTGY Architecture + Planning. The general contractor for the infrastructure is DeSilva Gates Construction.
