= Martin M-130 =

Flying boat

M-130
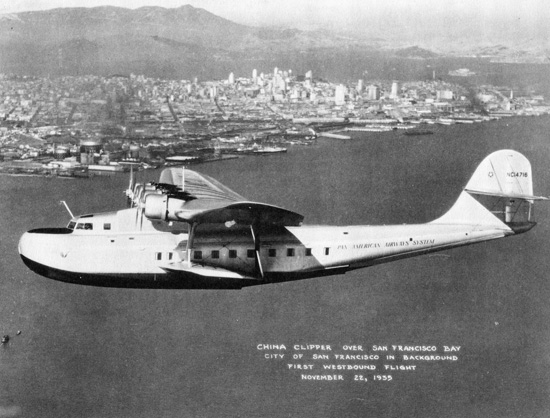
- China Clipper in 1935

General information
- Type: Flying Boat
- Manufacturer: Glenn L. Martin Company
- Status: All destroyed
- Primary user: Pan American Airways
- Number built: 3

History
- Introduction date: November 22, 1935
- First flight: December 30, 1934

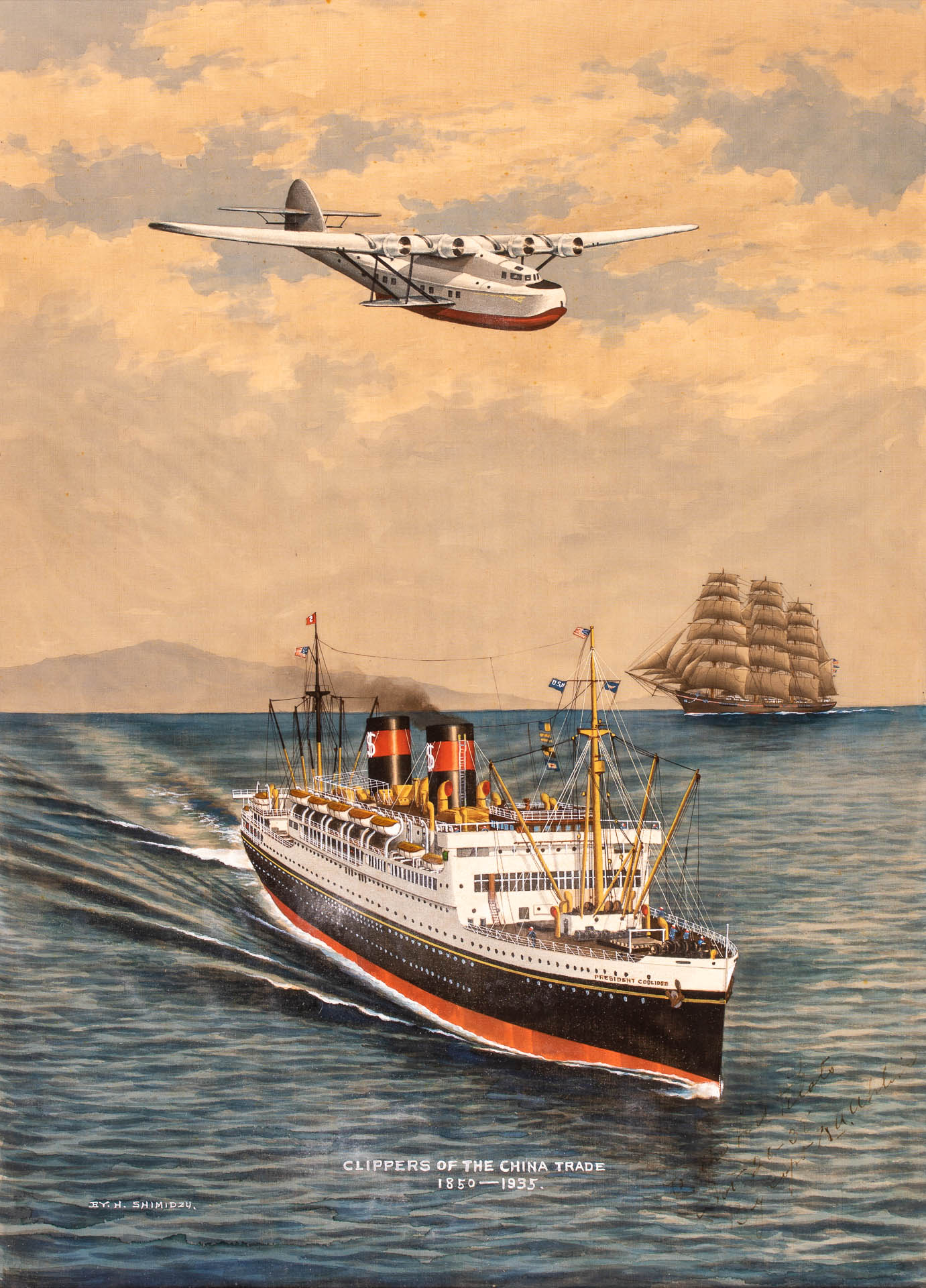
Artwork highlighting the aircraft in the context of other clippers

The Martin M-130 was a quad-engined commercial flying boat designed and produced in 1935 by the Glenn L. Martin Company in Baltimore, Maryland, for Pan American Airways. Intended to fly transpacific flights, three airframes were built: the China Clipper, the Philippine Clipper and the Hawaii Clipper. A similar flying boat design called the Martin 156 and named Russian Clipper, was later built for the Soviet Union; it had a larger wing (giving it greater range) and twin vertical stabilizers.

Martin named them the Martin Ocean Transports, but to the public they were the "China Clippers", a name that became a generic term for Pan Am's large flying boats - including, retroactively, the smaller Sikorsky S-42 (first flown in 1931) and larger Boeing 314 (first flown in 1938).

All three aircraft were lost while in service. Hawaii Clipper disappeared in 1938 on a flight over the Pacific, Philippine Clipper flew into a mountain in poor conditions in 1943, and finally in 1945 China Clipper broke up during landing at Trinidad and Tobago. In their time, they blazed trails as one of the first aircraft types to operate transpacific routes (some of the longest airline routes at the time) and also served as transports during World War II.

== Operational history ==
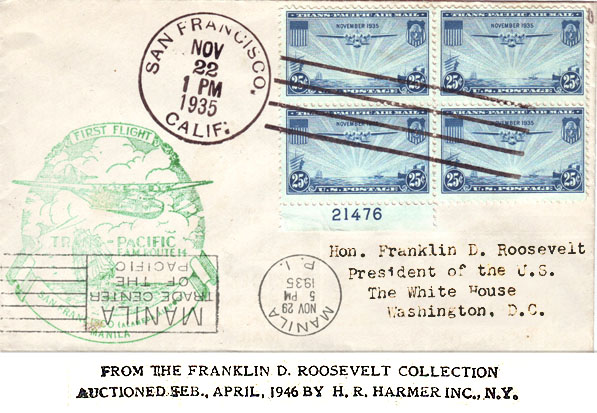
Cover flown on the "China Clipper" on the first commercial transpacific flight from Alameda, California, to Manila, Philippines (FAM 14) November 22–29, 1935

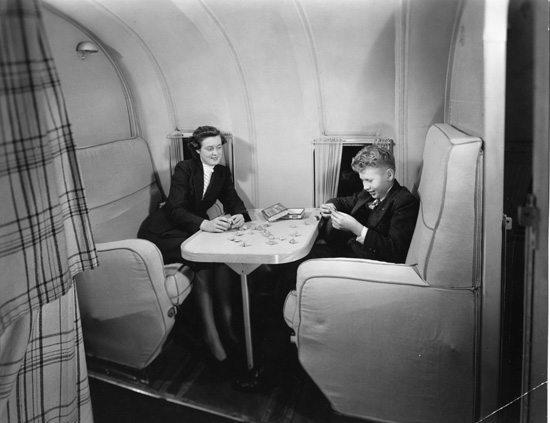
Cabin area

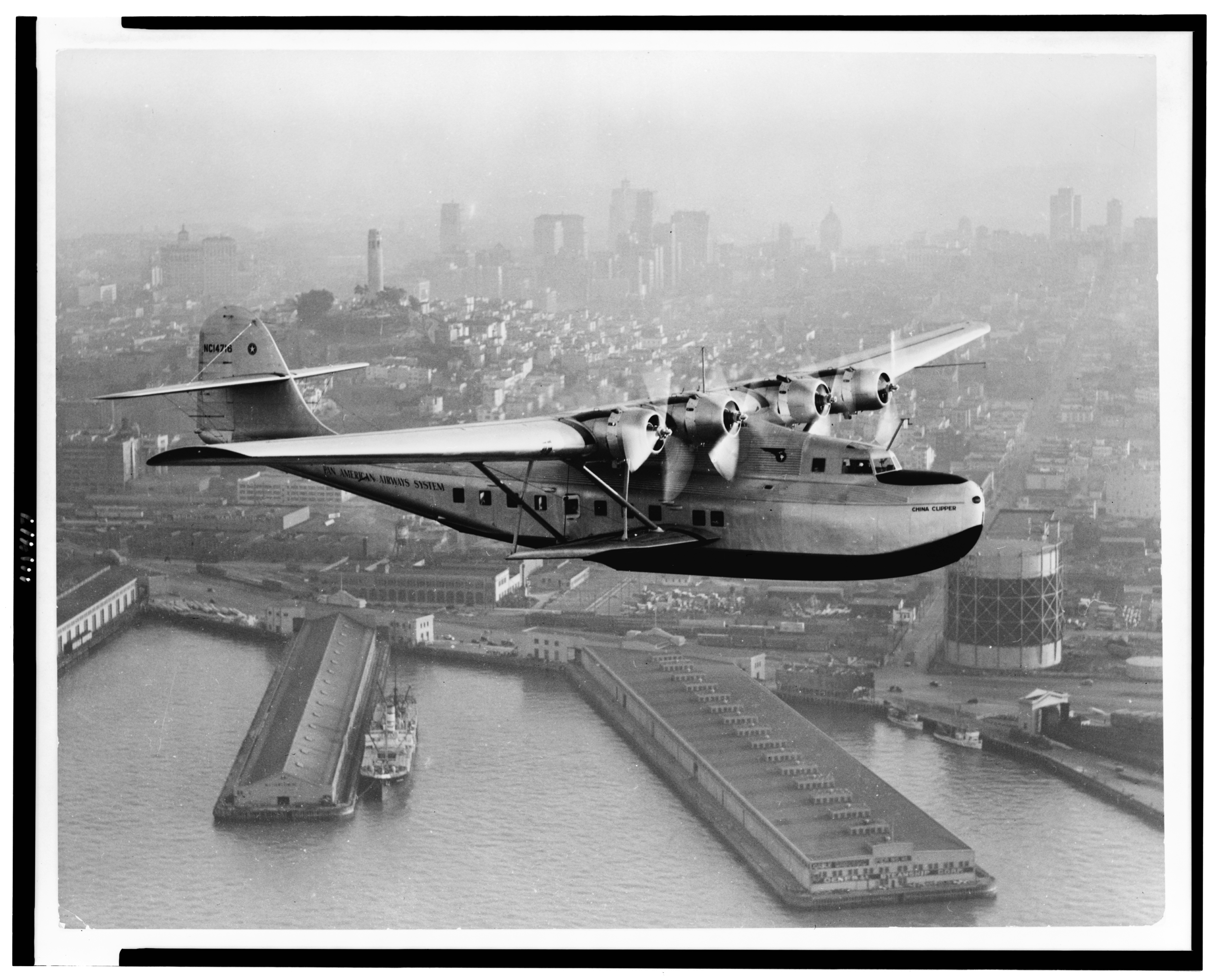
The China Clipper over San Francisco

Designed to meet Pan American Airways President Juan Trippe's desire for a trans-Pacific aircraft, the M-130 was an all-metal flying boat with streamlined aerodynamics and Pratt & Whitney engines powerful enough to meet Pan Am's specified range and payload. They were sold at US$417,000. The first flight was on December 30, 1934. On November 22, 1935, the China Clipper, piloted by Captain Edwin C. Musick and First Officer R.O.D. Sullivan, flew the first trans-Pacific airmail route. A postage stamp, Scott Catalog C-20, was printed for use on the transpacific service. With extended service, two more denominations were later issued. All three stamps have the same design, showing the M-130 in flight.

Weekly passenger flights across the Pacific Ocean began in October 1936 when Hawaii Clipper left San Francisco for Manila, stopping overnight at Honolulu, Midway Island, Wake Island and Guam. An S-42 began flying the Manila-Hong Kong route in 1937, and the Martins replaced it in 1938.

In July 1938, Hawaii Clipper disappeared between Guam and Manila with the loss of nine crew and six passengers. No cause was determined.

Their range and capacity made them valuable for trans-ocean military flights during World War II. Beginning in 1942, the two remaining planes were pressed into transport roles for the United States Navy.

The Philippine Clipper helped evacuate over 40 civilians, and survived the surprise Japanese attack on Wake Island in December 1941, following the attack on Pearl Harbor. It crashed into a mountain in January 1943, between Ukiah and Boonville, California on a flight from Honolulu. ComSubPac Admiral Robert H. English and 18 others were killed.

In January 1945, the China Clipper departed Miami on Pan Am's first scheduled flight to what is now Kinshasa in the Democratic Republic of the Congo. The route was intended to travel via Brazil before crossing the South Atlantic Ocean, but the last surviving M-130 did not complete the flight. On January 8, it crashed into the water, broke up, and sank during landing at Port of Spain, Trinidad and Tobago in the West Indies, killing 23 out of 30 on board.

Martin 130 aircraft of Pan American Airways
Name	Image	Registration	Delivered	Lost
Hawaii Clipper		NC14714	March 3, 1936	July 28, 1938
Philippine Clipper		NC14715	November 14, 1935	January 21, 1943
China Clipper		NC14716	October 9, 1935	January 8, 1945

== Specifications (Martin M-130) ==
Data from

General characteristics

- Crew: six-nine (Captain, First Officer, Junior Flight Officer, Engineering Officer, Assistant Engineering Officer, Radio Operator, Navigation Officer, plus cabin stewards)
- Capacity: 36 day, 18 night passengers
- Length: 90 ft 10.5 in (27.7 m)
- Wingspan: 130 ft 0 in (39.7 m)
- Height: 24 ft 7 in (7.5 m)
- Max takeoff weight: 52,252 lb (23,701 kg)
- Powerplant: 4 × Pratt & Whitney R-1830-S2A5G Twin Wasp 14-cylinder radial engines, 830 hp (708 kW) each later 950 hp with hydromatic propellers

Performance

- Maximum speed: 180 mph (290 km/h, 160 kn)
- Cruise speed: 130 mph (209 km/h, 110 kn)
- Range: 3,200 mi (5,150 km, 2,800 nmi)
- Service ceiling: 10,000 ft (3,048 m)

== See also ==
Related development

- Martin 156

Related lists

- List of aircraft of World War II
- List of flying boats and floatplanes

== Bibliography ==
- Davies, Ed (May–June 2000). "Clipper to China: Pan Am's Martin 130s in the Pacific, Part Two". Air Enthusiast. No. 87. pp. 2–8. ISSN 0143-5450.
- Davies, R.E.G. (1987). Pan Am: An Airline and its Aircraft. New York: Orion Books. ISBN 0-517-56639-7.
- Trautman, James (2011). Pan American Clippers: The Golden Age of Flying Boats (Softcover). Erin, Ontario, Canada: Boston Mills Press. ISBN 978-1-55407-894-3.
- Yenne, Bill (2003). Seaplanes & Flying Boats: A Timeless Collection from Aviation's Golden Age. New York: BCL Press. ISBN 1-932302-03-4.
- "Specifications of American Airplanes". Aviation. Vol. 36, no. 4. April 1937. pp. 66–71.
