= Robert Henry English =

United States Navy admiral

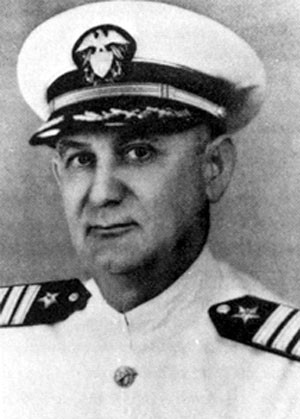
- Robert English prior to his promotion to rear admiral
- Born: 16 January 1888; Warrenton, Georgia, US
- Died: 21 January 1943 (aged 55) near Ukiah, California, US
- Burial place: Arlington National Cemetery
- Military career
- Allegiance: United States of America
- Branch: United States Navy
- Service years: 1911–1943
- Rank: Rear Admiral
- Commands: USS O-4 (SS-65); USS Helena (CL-50); Commander, Submarines, United States Pacific Fleet
- Conflicts: World War I World War II: Attack on Pearl Harbor
- Awards: Navy Cross; Distinguished Service Medal

Robert Henry English (16 January 1888 – 21 January 1943) was a United States Navy commissioned officer who commanded the U.S. Navy's submarine force in the Pacific Theater of Operations early in World War II.

English was born in Warrenton, Georgia, and he was a member of the United States Naval Academy class of 1911. Early in his naval career he became a submariner. In 1917, while commanding the submarine USS O-4 (SS-65), he received the Navy Cross for his great heroism in rescuing an officer trapped in the submarine USS O-5 (SS-66) after an explosion.

After a series of important assignments, he became commanding officer of the light cruiser USS Helena (CL-50), and during the Japanese attack on Pearl Harbor in Hawaii on 7 December 1941 was one of the first to bring his ship into action.

On 14 May 1942, he became Commander, Submarine Force, United States Pacific Fleet (COMSUBPAC), and was so serving when killed in the crash of Pan American Flight 1104 into a mountain about 7 miles (11 km) southwest of Ukiah in Mendocino County, California, on 21 January 1943. In the accident, English and other Navy officers were passengers on a four-engine Martin M-130 flying boat, being flown by a Pan American Airways civilian crew. The aircraft – dubbed the Philippine Clipper before the U.S Navy purchased it and pressed it into service during World War II – was destroyed in the accident; all 19 aboard were killed.

For his exceptionally meritorious service in his last assignment, English was posthumously awarded the Distinguished Service Medal. The citation was: "For exceptionally meritorious service as Commander, Submarines Pacific Fleet. In that position of great responsibility, Rear Admiral English directed the operations of his command with marked skill and resourcefulness, as a result of which heavy damage was inflicted on enemy ships and shipping. His example of tenacity and devotion to duty was in large part responsible for the high degree of combat efficiency attained by his command."

== Namesake ==
USS English (DD-696), an Allen M. Sumner-class destroyer in commission from 1944 to 1970, was named in English's honor.
