= Pan Am Flight 229 =

1938 aviation accident

Coordinates: 12°16′12″N 130°24′0″E

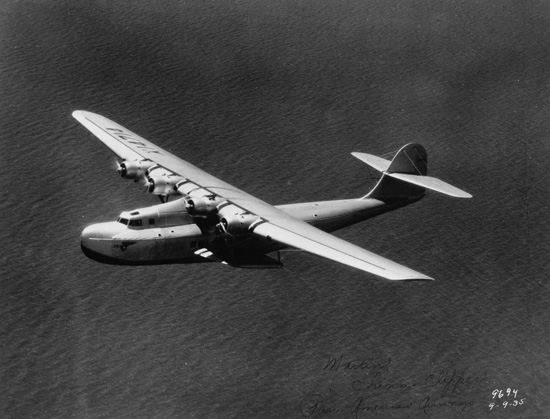
- The Martin M-130 was capable of landing on water, making it possible to extend commercial air flight to locations without runways.

Accident
- Date: July 28, 1938
- Summary: Disappearance
- Site: Western Pacific Ocean; Last sighted at

Aircraft
- Aircraft type: Martin M-130
- Aircraft name: Hawaii Clipper
- Operator: Pan American Airways
- Registration: NC14714
- Flight origin: San Francisco
- Stopover: Guam
- Destination: Manila
- Occupants: 15
- Passengers: 6
- Crew: 9
- Fatalities: 15
- Survivors: 0

Pan Am Flight 229 was a regularly scheduled passenger flight from San Francisco to Manila, which on July 28, 1938, disappeared after flying over the Pacific Ocean. The flight was operated by Hawaii Clipper, one of Pan American's 3 Martin M-130 flying boats. It disappeared with six passengers and nine crew. One passenger was Fred Meier, an aerobiologist, as discussed in the book “Air-Borne” (ISBN 978-0-593-47359-7.) The book also names 3 other passengers.

== Background ==
Pan American initiated trans-Pacific airmail service on 22 November 1935, and began carrying passengers in October 1936. The flying boat service between San Francisco Bay and Manila Bay required about 60 hours of flying time over six days, with intermediate stops at Pearl Harbor, Midway Atoll, Wake Island, and Guam.

== Disappearance ==
Flight 229 first took off from Alameda, California, and landed at Guam, without incident. The flight departed Guam on the last leg of the westbound journey at 11:39 local time on 28 July 1938. The last radio contact was 3 hours 27 minutes later, when the aircraft reported flying through layers of clouds and moderately rough air 565 miles (909 km) from the Philippine coast.

The US Army transport ship USAT Meigs found an oil slick along the course of the lost aircraft about 500 miles (800 km) from Manila, took samples, and stood by to investigate. Search for the plane was called off on August 5, 1938. Later tests on the oil samples collected by Meigs indicated no connection with the aircraft. Modern reviews of the events and oil sampling techniques have led some to conclude the test of oil from the tropical Pacific compared to samples from San Francisco were not conclusive in ruling out a link with a slick found close to the last estimated position allowing for ocean currents.

Hawaii Clipper was the first of the initial three long-range flying boats to be lost. It was the worst Pacific airline accident at the time, although fatalities were higher when the other two Martin M-130 flying boats crashed later. The Flight V-1104 crash of 1943, involving Philippine Clipper killed 19, and the Flight 161 crash of 1945, involving China Clipper killed 23.

== See also ==
- List of accidents and incidents involving commercial aircraft
- List of people who disappeared mysteriously at sea
- List of missing aircraft
- List of unrecovered flight recorders
- List of unsolved deaths
