= Pan Am Flight V-1104 =

1943 aviation accident in the United States

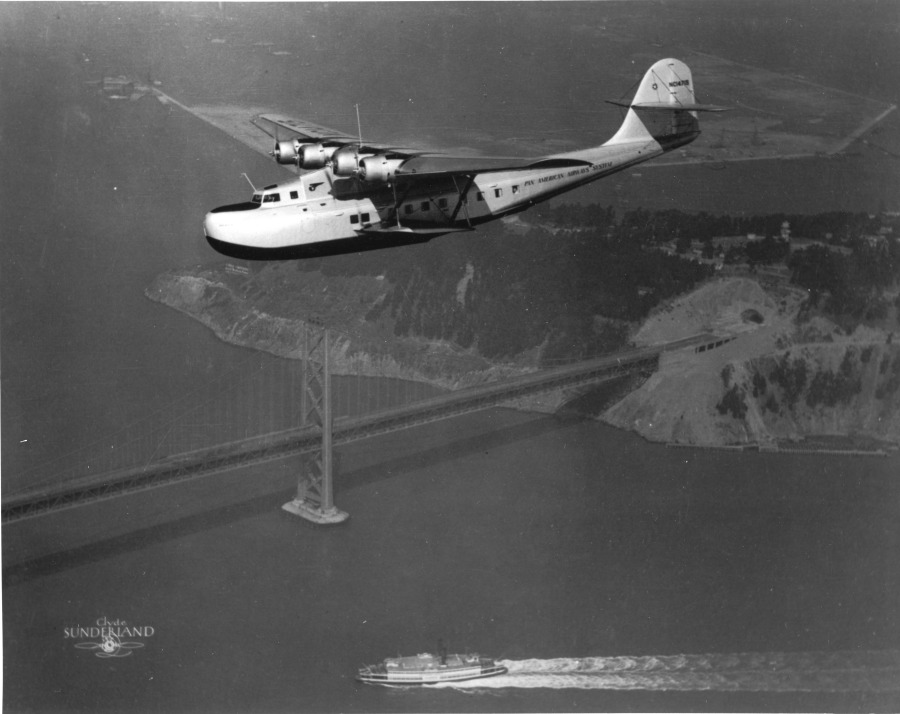
- NC14715, the aircraft involved in the accident

Accident
- Date: January 21, 1943
- Summary: Controlled flight into terrain due to pilot error
- Site: Mendocino County, 7 miles (11 km) SW of Ukiah, California; 39°04′0″N 123°17′0″W

Aircraft
- Aircraft type: Martin M-130
- Aircraft name: Philippine Clipper
- Operator: Pan American World Airways
- Call sign: CLIPPER VICTOR-1104
- Registration: NC14715
- Flight origin: Pearl Harbor, Oahu, Hawaii
- Destination: San Francisco, California
- Passengers: 10
- Crew: 9
- Fatalities: 19
- Survivors: 0

Pan Am Flight V-1104, trip no. 62100, was a Martin M-130 flying boat nicknamed the Philippine Clipper that crashed on the morning of January 21, 1943, in Northern California. The aircraft was operated by Pan American Airways, and was carrying ten US Navy personnel from Pearl Harbor, Hawaii, to San Francisco, California. The aircraft crashed in poor weather into mountainous terrain about 7 mi (11 km) southwest of Ukiah, California.

== Aircraft ==
The Philippine Clipper was one of three M-130 flying boats designed for Pan Am by the Glenn L. Martin Company. It was built as a trans-Pacific airliner and sold for $417,000 (equivalent to $7.5 million in 2024). At the time, the M-130 was the largest aircraft built in the United States, until it was surpassed in 1938 by the Boeing 314. The Philippine Clipper entered service with Pan American in 1936, and inaugurated passenger service between the United States and Manila in October 1936.

The Philippine Clipper was at Wake Island when it was attacked by the Japanese on December 8, 1941. It was slightly damaged in the attack, and departed the island shortly afterwards.

During World War II, the Philippine Clipper and sister ship China Clipper were pressed into service for the Navy, though they remained crewed by Pan American personnel. At the time of the crash, the aircraft had logged 14,628 hours of flight time, had flown the Pacific Ocean for eight years, and had survived strafing by Japanese aircraft on Wake Island on December 8, 1941.

== Crash ==
The wind was blowing so hard it blew over trees ... The plane was flying very low. It had its lights on and came right over my house and disappeared in the storm to the north.

— Mrs. Charles Wallach, Civil Defense aircraft spotter

Flight V-1104 departed from Pearl Harbor on Oahu in the Hawaiian Islands at 5:30 pm on January 20, 1943. The nine-man Pan Am crew consisted of four pilots, two engineers, two radio operators, and a steward. The flight was captained by Robert M. Elzey. By mid-January 1943, Captain Elzey had accumulated about 4,941 flying hours, of which 3,359 were while in the employ of Pan American.

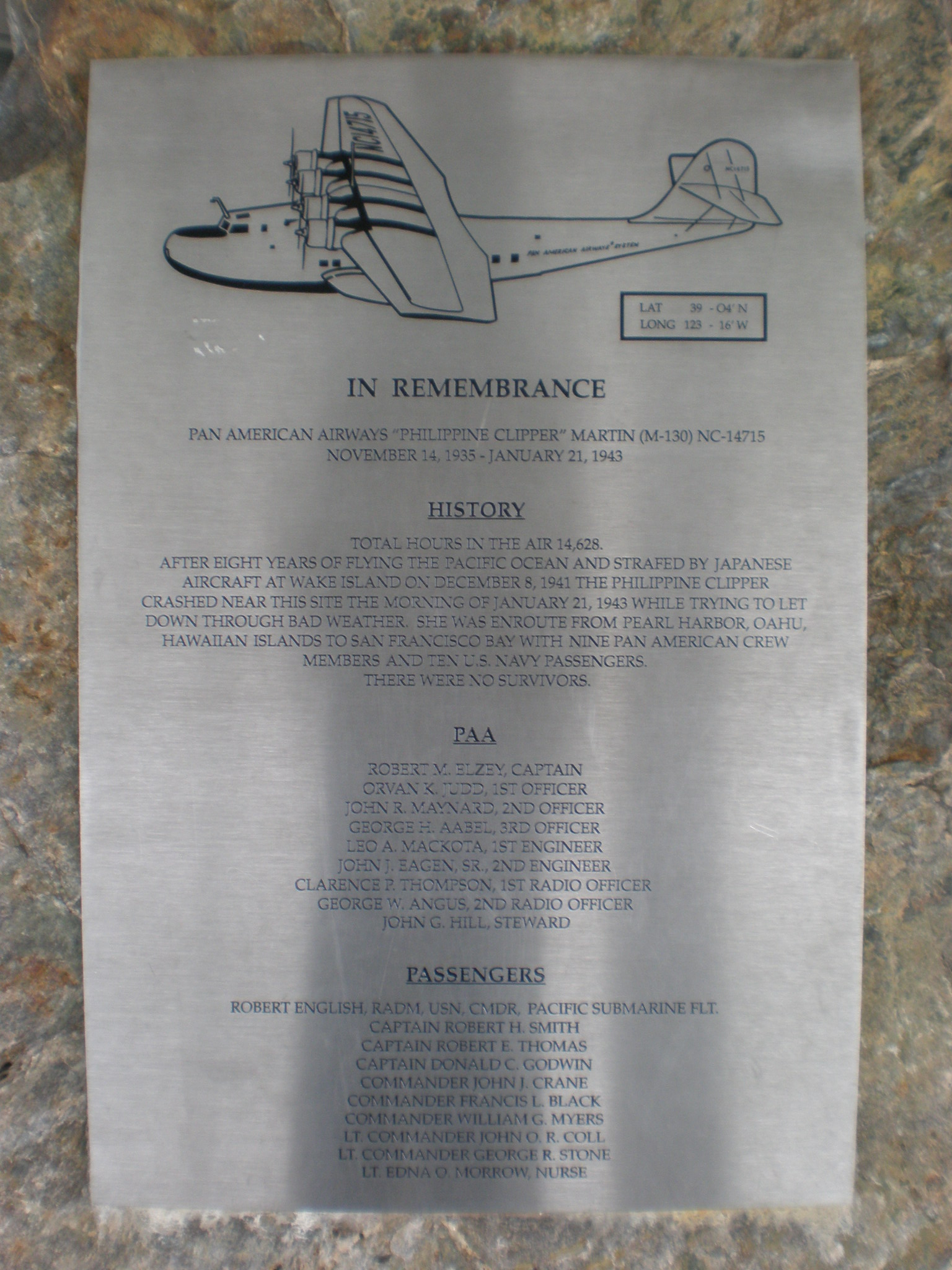
Memorial plaque located at the Hiller Aviation Museum

The 10 passengers on board were all U.S. naval officers. Among them was Rear Admiral Robert H. English, the commander of the U.S. Pacific Submarine Fleet, the submarine component of the United States Pacific Fleet. Rear Admiral English planned to visit submarine support facilities at the Mare Island Naval Shipyard bordering San Pablo Bay, and was accompanied by three of his senior staff officers. Another passenger was Lieutenant Edna Morrow, a Navy nurse diagnosed with terminal cancer who was on her way home to die. Also on board was Captain Robert Holmes Smith, formerly in command of the USS Sperry (AS-12) submarine tender, and recently promoted to Commander of Squadron 2, Pacific Submarine Fleet.

Until the crash, the flight was routine, as evidenced by radio transmissions during the night. A strong tailwind put the flight three and a half hours ahead of schedule.

On the morning of January 21, 1943, the aircraft ran into poor weather as it flew north over California towards San Francisco. Heavy rain, strong winds, thick cloud cover, and fog forced the captain to descend to a lower altitude. At 7:30 am, the far-off-course aircraft crashed into a mountain at about 2,500 ft (760 m), descending at an angle of 10°, whereupon it clipped a number of trees before crashing, breaking up, and burning. Over a week passed before the wreckage was located, and after it was found, the area was cordoned off by soldiers to protect any surviving classified military documents that may have been carried aboard.

The Civil Aeronautics Board investigated the crash and decided the probable cause was pilot error.

Failure of the captain to determine his position accurately before descending to a dangerously low altitude under extremely poor weather conditions during the hours of darkness.

— Civil Aeronautics Board, CAB File No. 1413-43

== Memorial ==
The Hiller Aviation Museum, in San Carlos, California, has a memorial plaque to the aircraft which sits outside the entrance to the museum. The memorial plaque includes a brief history of the aircraft, as well as a list of casualties. The museum is situated near the flight's destination of San Francisco Bay, about 157 miles (253 km) from the accident site.

== See also ==
- 1943 in aviation
- China Clipper, the first of three Martin M-130 flying boats built for Pan Am
- Hawaii Clipper, lost in 1938
- Edwin Musick, Chief pilot, Pan American, pioneered many of Pan Am's transoceanic routes, died in an in-flight fuel explosion.
- List of accidents and incidents involving commercial aircraft
