= Pan Am =

United States airline (1927–1991)

Pan American World Airways
- Logo used from 1973 to 1991

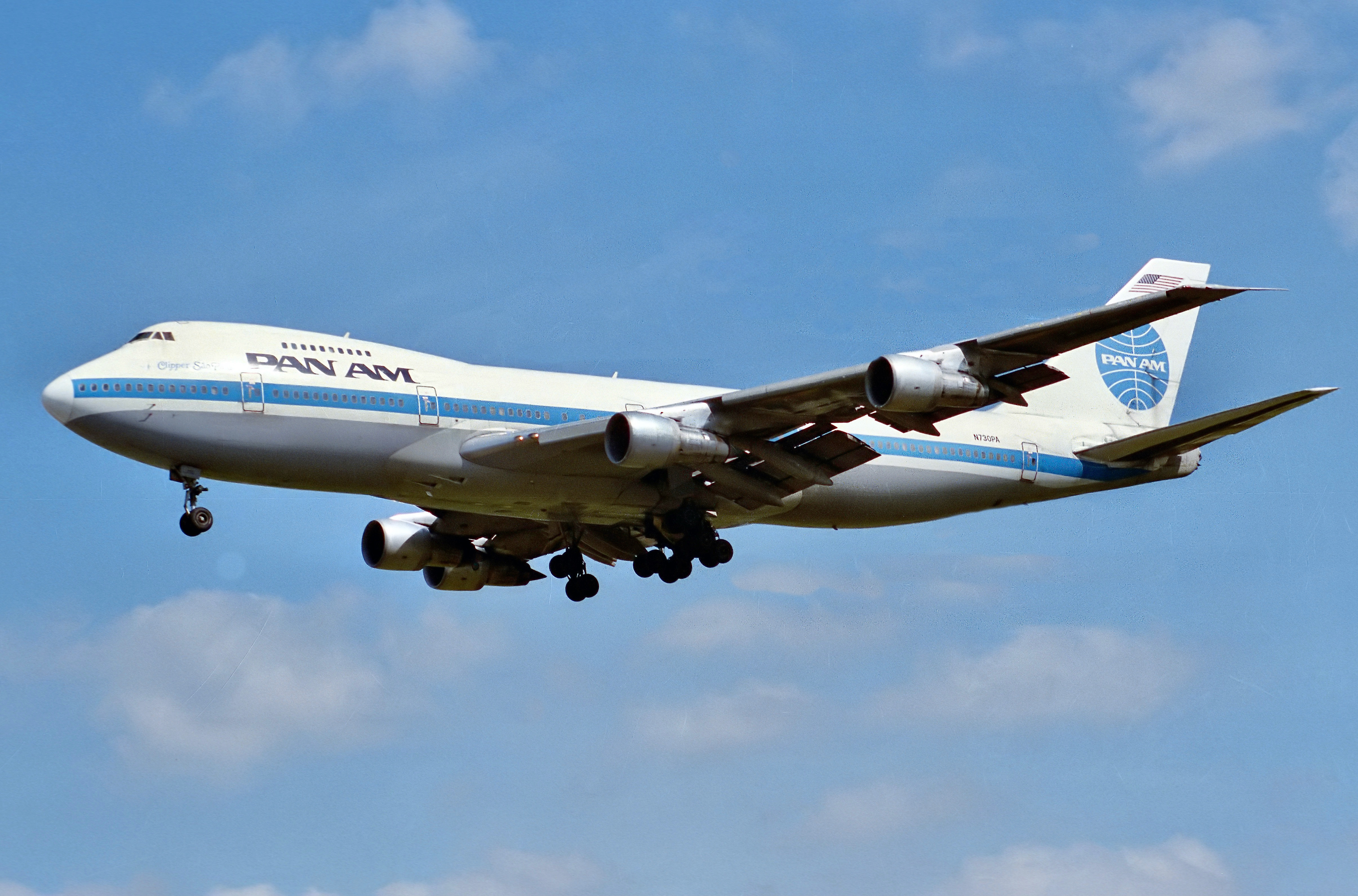
- Pan Am Boeing 747-212B "Clipper Gem of the Ocean"
IATA	ICAO	Call sign
PA	PAA	CLIPPER
- Founded: March 14, 1927 (as Pan American Airways, Inc.) June 23, 1928 (Pan American Airways Corporation) (Note: Originally known as "Aviation Corporation of the Americas" before changing its name to Pan American Airways Corp. in 1931.)
- Commenced operations: October 19, 1927 (as Pan American Airways)
- Ceased operations: December 4, 1991
- AOC #: 1
- Operating bases: Berlin–Tegel (1975–1990); Berlin–Tempelhof (1950–1975); Frankfurt (before November 1991); Hong Kong–Kai Tak (before 1986); Houston–Intercontinental (1980–1986); London–Heathrow (before April 1991); Los Angeles (before 1986); Miami; New York–JFK (before November 1991); San Francisco (before 1986); Tokyo–Haneda (1947–1978); Tokyo–Narita (1978–1986); Washington–Dulles (before 1990)
- Frequent-flyer program: WorldPass
- Subsidiaries: International Hotels Corporation (1946–1981); SAHSA (40%) (1945–1970); Pan Am Express (1987–1991); Pan Am Shuttle (1986–1991); Panagra (50%) (1928–1967); UMCA (100%) (1932–1959)
- Fleet size: 226
- Destinations: 87 countries on six continents at its peak in 1968
- Headquarters: Pan Am Building, New York City, New York; Miami, Florida
- Key people: Juan Trippe (CEO, 1927–1968); Harold E. Gray (CEO, 1968–1969); Najeeb Halaby (CEO, 1969–1971); William Seawell (CEO, 1971–1981); Ed Acker (CEO, 1981–1988); Thomas G. Plaskett (CEO, 1988–1991); Russell L. Ray Jr. (CEO, 1991)
- Founders: Henry H. Arnold; Carl Spaatz; (Pan American Airways, Inc.); Juan Trippe; Cornelius Vanderbilt Whitney; (Pan American Airways Corporation)
- Website: panam.com

Pan American World Airways, originally founded as Pan American Airways and more commonly known as Pan Am, was a major airline in the United States that was the largest international air carrier for much of the 20th century. The first airline to fly worldwide, it pioneered innovations such as jumbo jets and computerized reservation systems, and introduced the first American jetliner, the Boeing 707, in 1958. Until its dissolution on December 4, 1991, Pan Am was, and remains a cultural icon of the 20th century, identified by its blue globe logo ("The Blue Meatball"), the use of the word "Clipper" in its aircraft names and call signs, and the white uniform caps of its pilots.

Founded in 1927 by two U.S. Army Air Corps majors, Pan Am began as a scheduled airmail and passenger service flying between Key West, Florida, and Havana, Cuba. In the 1930s, under the leadership of American entrepreneur Juan Trippe, the airline purchased a fleet of flying boats and focused its route network on Central and South America, gradually adding transatlantic and transpacific destinations. By the mid-20th century, Pan Am enjoyed a near monopoly on international routes. It led the aircraft industry into the Jet Age by acquiring new jetliners such as the Boeing 707 and Boeing 747. Pan Am's modern fleet allowed it to fly larger numbers of passengers, at a longer range, and with fewer stops than rivals. Its primary hub and flagship terminal was the Worldport at John F. Kennedy International Airport in New York City.

During its peak between the late 1950s and early 1970s, Pan Am had an advanced fleet, highly trained staff, and amenities. In 1970, it flew 11 million passengers to 86 countries, with destinations in every continent except Antarctica. In an era dominated by flag carriers that were wholly or majority-owned by governments, Pan Am became the unofficial national carrier of the United States. It was a founding member of the International Air Transport Association (IATA), the global airline industry association.

In the mid-1970s, Pan Am began facing a series of challenges both internal and external, along with rising competition from the deregulation of the American airline industry in 1978. After several attempts at financial restructuring and rebranding throughout the 1980s, Pan Am gradually sold off its assets before declaring bankruptcy in 1991. When it ceased operations, the airline's trademark was the second-most-recognized worldwide. To travelers and many Americans, its closure signified the end of the golden age of air travel. Its brand, iconography, and contributions to the industry remain well known in the 21st century. The airline's name and imagery were purchased in 1998 by railroad holding company Guilford Transportation Industries, which changed its name to Pan Am Systems and adopted Pan Am's logo.

== History ==
=== Formation ===
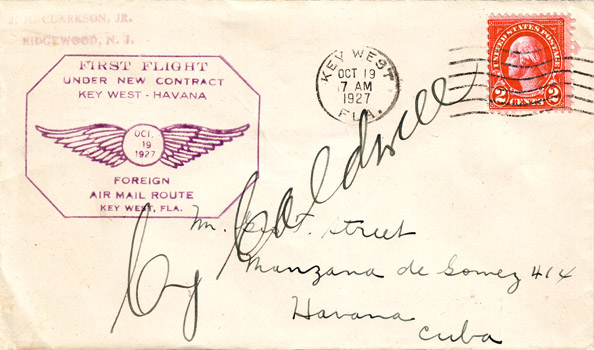
Flown cover autographed by pilot Cy Caldwell and carried from Key West, Florida, to Havana, Cuba, on the first contract airmail flight operated by Pan American Airways, October 19, 1927

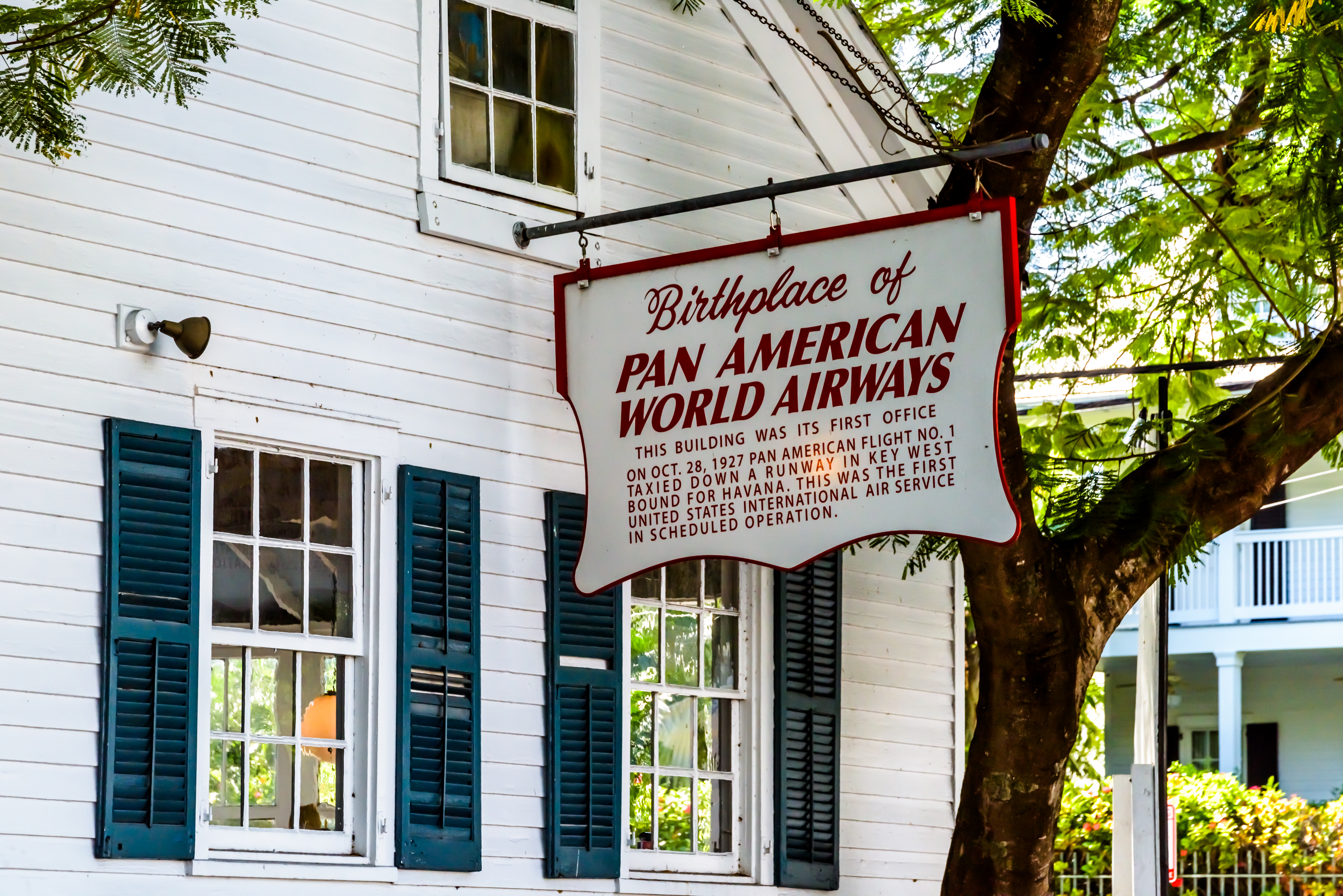
"Birthplace of Pan American World Airways", Key West, Florida. It is now a restaurant.

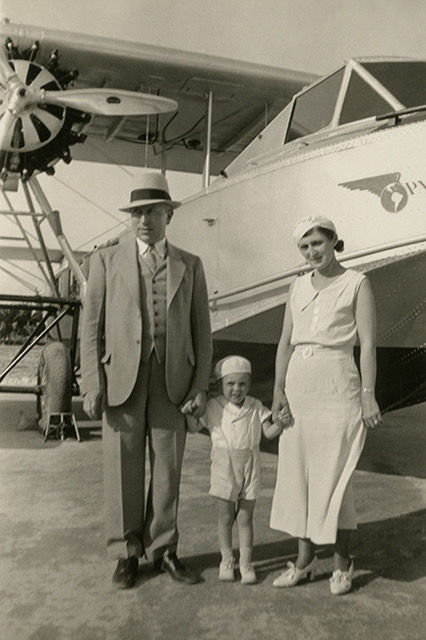
Tourists with a Consolidated Commodore flying boat, used to fly routes in the Caribbean in the 1930s

Pan American Airways, Incorporated (PAA) was founded as a shell company on March 14, 1927, by United States Army Air Corps officers Henry "Hap" Arnold, Carl Spaatz, and John Jouett out of concern for the growing influence of the German-owned Colombian air carrier SCADTA, in Central America. Operating in Colombia since 1920, SCADTA lobbied hard for landing rights in the Panama Canal Zone, ostensibly to survey air routes for a connection to the United States, which the Air Corps viewed as a precursor to a possible German aerial threat to the canal. In the spring of 1927, the United States Post Office requested bids on a contract to deliver mail from Key West, Florida, to Havana, Cuba, before October 19, 1927. Arnold and Spaatz drew up the prospectus for Pan American after they learned that SCADTA hired a company in Delaware to obtain airmail contracts from the US government.

Also competing for the contract, Juan Trippe formed the Aviation Corporation of the Americas (ACA) on June 2, 1927, with $250,000 (equivalent to $3.72 million in 2025) in startup capital and the backing of powerful and politically connected financiers, including Cornelius Vanderbilt Whitney and W. Averell Harriman. Their operation had the all-important landing rights for Havana, having acquired American International Airways, a small airline established in 1926 by John K. Montgomery and Richard B. Bevier as a seaplane service from Key West to Havana. A third company, Atlantic, Gulf, and Caribbean Airways, was established on October 11, 1927, by New York City investment banker Richard Hoyt to bid for the contract.

The Postal Service awarded Pan American Airways the US mail delivery contract to Cuba, at the end of the bidding process, but Pan American lacked aircraft and landing rights in Cuba. Just days before the October 19 deadline, the three companies decided to form a partnership. ACA chartered a Fairchild FC-2 floatplane from a small Dominican Republic carrier, West Indian Aerial Express, allowing Pan Am to operate the first flight to Havana on October 19, 1927. The three companies merged on June 23, 1928. Richard Hoyt was named president of the new Aviation Corporation of the Americas, but Trippe and his partners held 40% of the equity, and Whitney was made president. Trippe became operational head of Pan American Airways, the new company's principal operating subsidiary.

The US government approved the original Pan Am's mail delivery contract with little objection, out of fears that SCADTA would have no competition in bidding for routes between Latin America and the United States. The government further helped Pan Am by insulating it from its US competitors, seeing the airline as the "chosen instrument" for US-based international air routes. The airline expanded internationally, benefiting from a virtual monopoly on foreign routes.

Trippe and his associates planned to extend Pan Am's network through all of Central and South America. During the late 1920s and early 1930s, Pan Am purchased a number of ailing or defunct airlines in Central and South America and negotiated with postal officials to win most of the government's airmail contracts for the region. In September 1929 Trippe toured Latin America with Charles Lindbergh to negotiate landing rights in a number of countries, including Barranquilla on SCADTA's home turf of Colombia, as well as Maracaibo and Caracas in Venezuela. By the end of the year, Pan Am offered flights along the west coast of South America to Peru. Following government favors for the denial of mail contracts to their competition, a forced merger was created with New York, Rio, and Buenos Aires Line, giving a seaplane route along the east coast of South America to Buenos Aires, Argentina, and westbound to Santiago, Chile. Its Brazilian subsidiary, NYRBA do Brasil, was later renamed Panair do Brasil. Pan Am also partnered with the Grace Shipping Company in 1929 to form Pan American-Grace Airways, better known as Panagra, to gain a foothold in destinations in South America. In the same year, Pan Am acquired a controlling stake in Mexicana de Aviación and took over Mexicana's Ford Trimotor route between Brownsville, Texas, and Mexico City, extending this service to the Yucatan Peninsula to connect with Pan Am's Caribbean route network.

Pan Am's holding company, the Aviation Corporation of the Americas, was one of the most sought-after publicly listed shares on the New York Curb Exchange in 1929, and flurries of speculation surrounded each of its new route awards. In April 1929 Trippe and his associates reached an agreement with United Aircraft and Transport Corporation (UATC) to segregate Pan Am operations to the south of the Mexico–United States border, in exchange for UATC taking a large shareholder stake (UATC was the parent company of what are now Boeing, Pratt & Whitney, and United Airlines). The Aviation Corporation of the Americas changed its name to Pan American Airways Corporation in 1931.

=== Clipper era ===
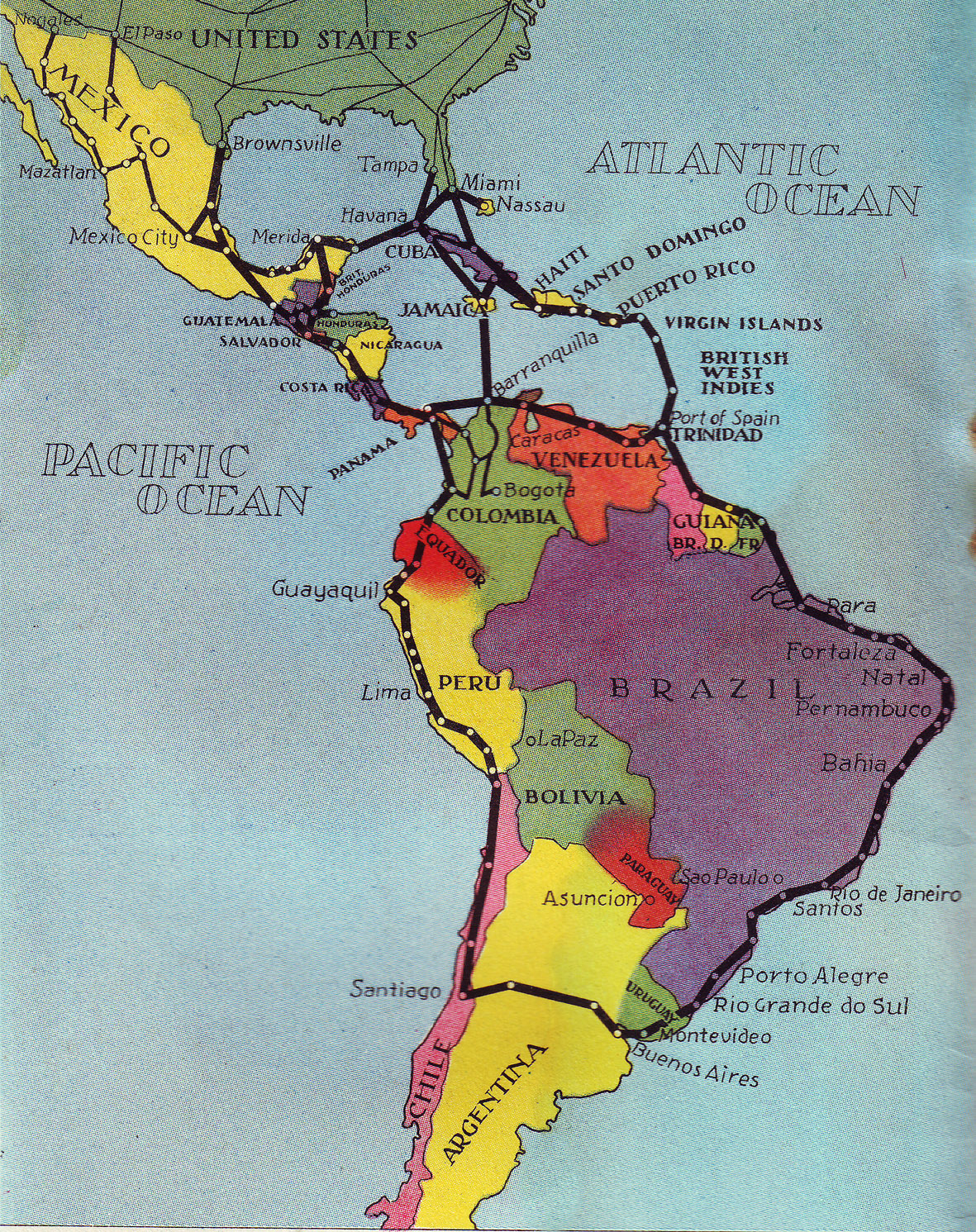
PAA routes as of 1936

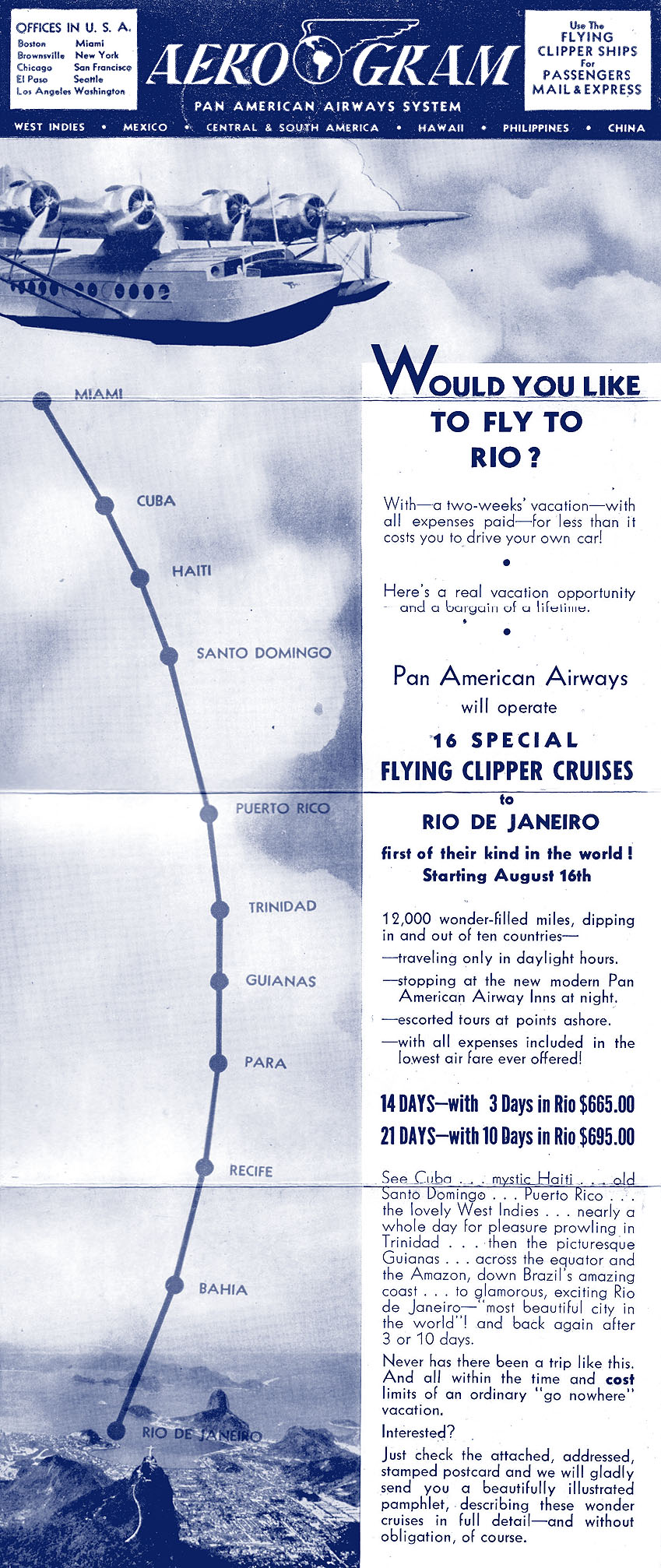
1941 advertising mailer for Pan Am's "Flying Clipper Cruises" to South America

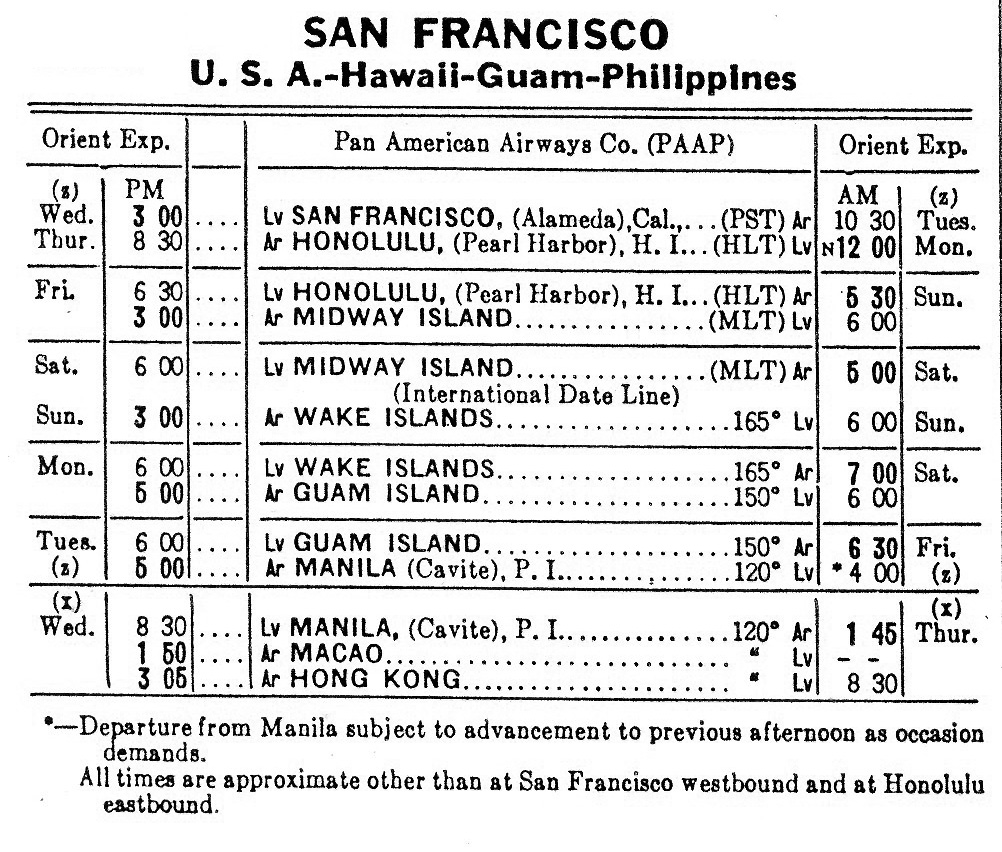
PAA's China Clipper service cut the time of a transpacific crossing from as much as six weeks by sea to just six days by air.

Pan Am started its South American routes with Consolidated Commodores and Sikorsky S-38 flying boats. The S-40, larger than the eight-passenger S-38, began flying for Pan Am in 1931. Carrying the nicknames American Clipper, Southern Clipper, and Caribbean Clipper, they were the first of the series of 28 Clippers that symbolized Pan Am between 1931 and 1946. During this time, Pan Am operated Clipper services to Latin America from the International Pan American Airport at Dinner Key in Miami, Florida.

In 1937 Pan Am turned to Britain and France to begin seaplane service between the United States and Europe. Pan Am reached an agreement with both countries to offer service from Norfolk, Virginia, to Europe via Bermuda and the Azores using the S-42s. A joint service from Port Washington, New York, to Bermuda began in June 1937, with Pan Am using Sikorskys and Imperial Airways using the C-class flying boat RMA Cavalier.

On July 5, 1937, survey flights across the North Atlantic began. Pan Am Clipper III, a Sikorsky S-42, landed at Botwood in the Bay of Exploits in Newfoundland from Port Washington, via Shediac, New Brunswick. The next day Pan Am Clipper III left Botwood for Foynes in County Limerick, Ireland. The same day, a Short Empire C-Class flying boat, the Caledonia, left Foynes for Botwood, and landed July 6, 1937, reaching Montreal on July 8 and New York on July 9.

Trippe decided to start a service from San Francisco to Honolulu and on to Hong Kong and Auckland following steamship routes. After negotiating traffic rights in 1934 to land at Pearl Harbor, Midway Island, Wake Island, Guam, and Manila, Pan Am shipped $500,000 worth of aeronautical equipment and construction crews westward in March 1935 using the S.S. North Haven, a 15,000-ton merchant ship chartered to provision each island that the clippers would stop at on their 4- to 5-day flight. Pan Am ran its first survey flight to Honolulu in April 1935 with a Sikorsky S-42 flying boat. Construction crews, including Bill Mullahey who would later oversee Pan Am's Pacific operations, cleared coral from lagoons, constructed hotels, and installed the radio navigation equipment necessary for the clippers to island hop from Pearl City Seaplane Base, Hawaii, to Asia. The airline won the contract for a San Francisco–Canton mail route later that year and operated its first commercial flight carrying mail and express (no passengers) in a Martin M-130 from Alameda to Manila amid media fanfare on November 22, 1935. The five-leg, 8,000-mile (13,000 km) flight arrived in Manila on November 29 and returned to San Francisco on December 6, cutting the time between the two cities by the fastest scheduled steamship by over two weeks. (Both the United States and the Philippine Islands issued special stamps for the two flights.) The first passenger flight left Alameda on October 21, 1936. The fare from San Francisco to Manila or Hong Kong in 1937 was US$950 one way (equivalent to $21,276 in 2025) and US$1,710 (equivalent to $38,297 in 2025) round trip. This later became known as the Pan Am China Clipper route, from San Francisco, leading to Manila, Hong Kong, Shanghai.

On August 6, 1937, Juan Trippe accepted United States aviation's highest annual prize, the Collier Trophy, on behalf of PAA from President Franklin D. Roosevelt for the company's "establishment of the transpacific airline and the successful execution of extended overwater navigation and the regular operations thereof."

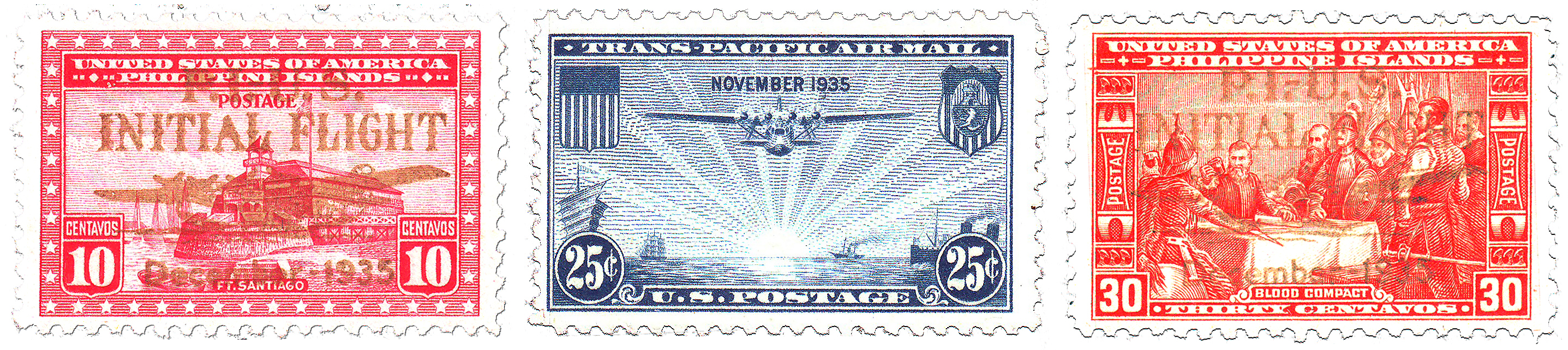
Stamps issued by the United States and Philippine Islands for Air Mail carried on the first flights in each direction of PAA's Transpacific "China Clipper" service between San Francisco, California, and Manila, Philippines (November 22 – December 6, 1935)

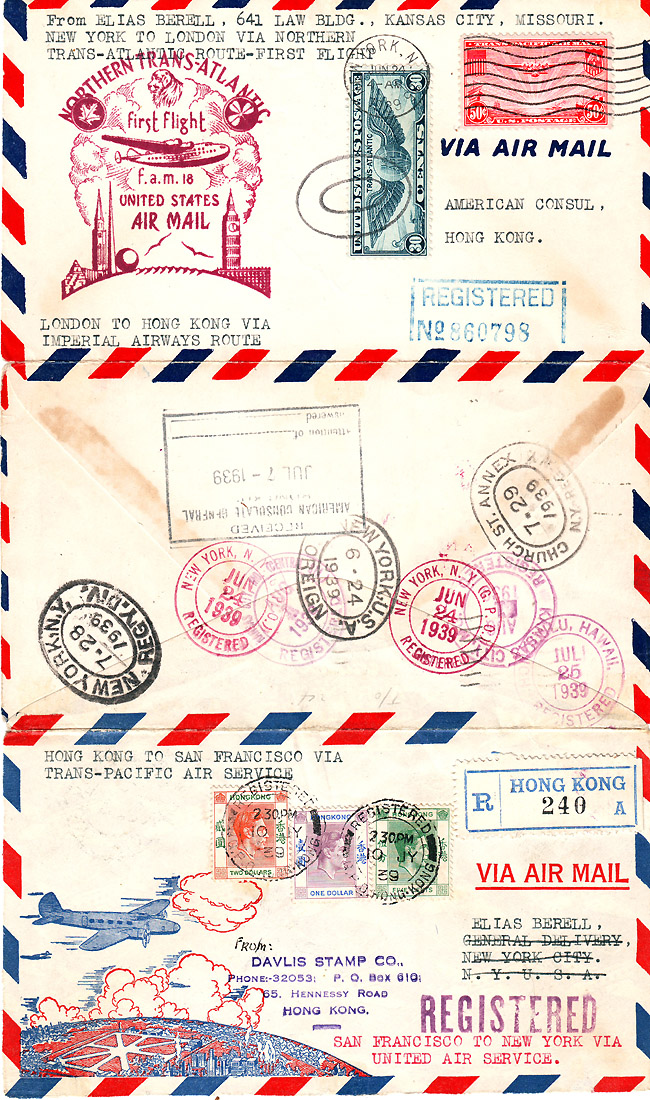
Flown cover carried around the world on PAA Boeing 314 Clippers and by Imperial Airways, June 24 – July 28, 1939

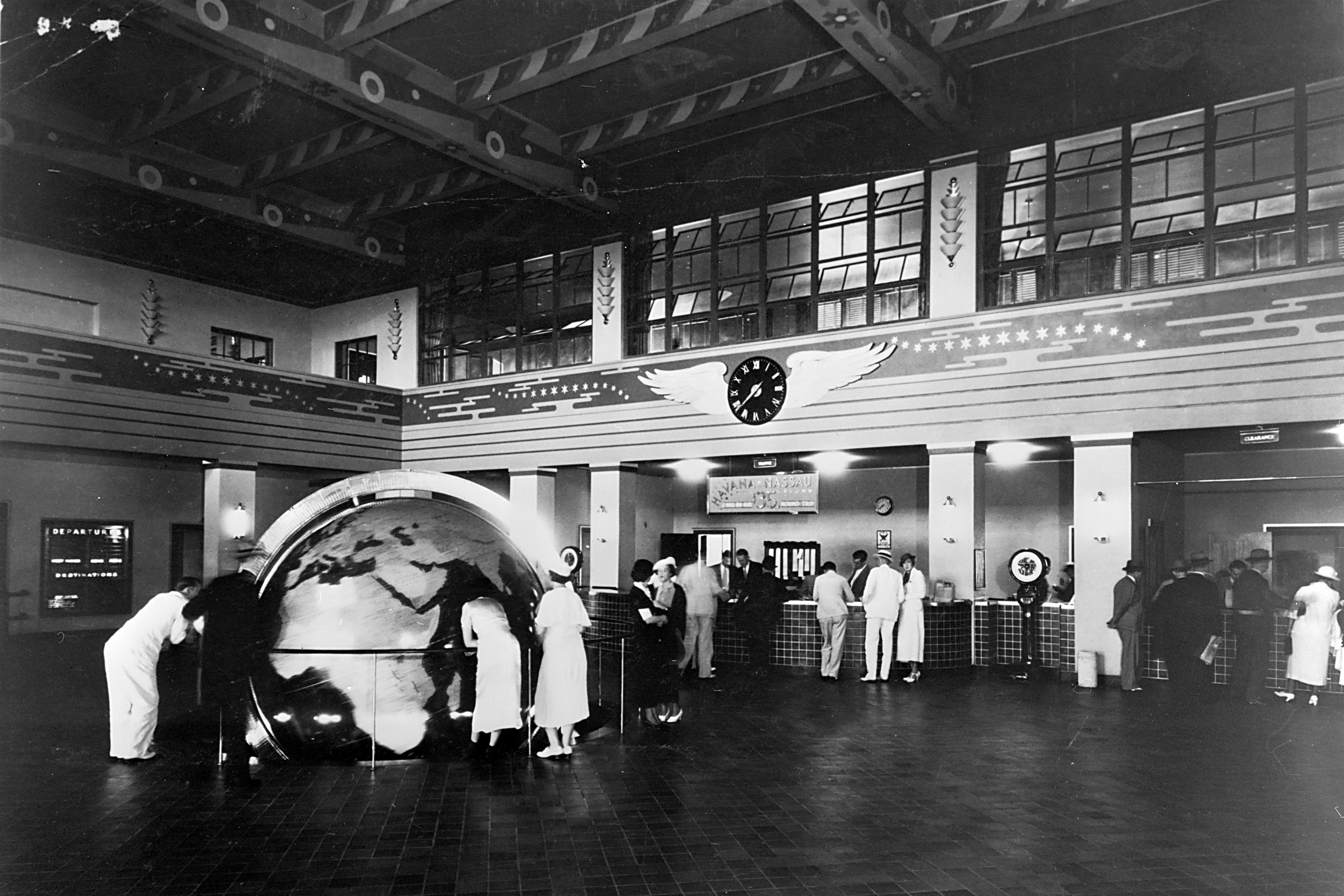
Pan Am's flying boat terminal at Dinner Key in Miami, Florida, was a hub of inter-American travel during the 1930s and 1940s.

Pan Am also used Boeing 314 flying boats for the Pacific route: in China, passengers could connect to domestic flights on the Pan Am-operated China National Aviation Corporation (CNAC) network, co-owned with the Chinese government. Pan Am flew to Singapore for the first time in 1941, starting a semi-monthly service that reduced San Francisco–Singapore travel times from 25 days to six days.

Six large, long-range Boeing 314 flying boats were delivered to Pan Am in early 1939. On March 30, 1939, the Yankee Clipper, piloted by Harold E. Gray, made the first-ever trans-Atlantic passenger flight. The first leg of the flight, Baltimore to Horta, took 17 hours and 32 minutes and covered 2,400 miles (3,900 km; 2,100 nmi). The second leg from Horta to Pan Am's newly built airport in Lisbon took 7 hours and 7 minutes and covered 1,200 miles (1,900 km).

The Boeing 314 also enabled the start of scheduled weekly contract Foreign Air Mail (F.A.M. 18) service and later passenger flights from New York (Port Washington, L.I.) to both France and Britain. The Southern route to France was inaugurated for airmail on May 20, 1939, by the Yankee Clipper piloted by Arthur E. LaPorte flying via Horta, Azores, and Lisbon, Portugal to Marseilles. Passenger service over the route was added on June 28, 1939, by the Dixie Clipper piloted by R.O.D. Sullivan. The eastbound trip departed every Wednesday at noon and arrived at Marseilles on Friday at 3 pm GCT with return service leaving Marseilles on Sunday at 8 am and arriving at Port Washington on Tuesday at 7 am.

The Northern transatlantic route to Britain was inaugurated for Air Mail service on June 24, 1939, by the Yankee Clipper piloted by Harold Gray flying via Shediac (New Brunswick), Botwood (Newfoundland), and Foynes (Ireland) to Southampton. Passenger service was added on the Northern route on July 8, 1939, by the Yankee Clipper. Eastbound flights left on Saturday at 7:30 am and arrived at Southampton on Sunday at 1 pm GCT. Westbound service departed Southampton on Wednesday at noon and arrived at Port Washington on Thursday at 3 pm.

After the outbreak of World War II in Europe on September 1, 1939, the terminus became Foynes until the service ceased for the winter on October 5 while transatlantic service to Lisbon via the Azores continued into 1941. During World War II, Pan Am flew over 90 million mi (140 million km) worldwide in support of military operations.

The "Clippers"—the name hearkened back to the 19th-century fast-sailing clippers—were the only American passenger aircraft of the time capable of intercontinental travel. To compete with ocean liners, the airline offered first-class seats on such flights, and the style of flight crews became more formal. Instead of being leather-jacketed, silk-scarved airmail pilots, the crews of the "Clippers" wore naval-style uniforms and adopted a set procession when boarding the aircraft. In 1940 Pan Am and TWA both received and began using the Boeing 307 Stratoliner, the first pressurized airliner to enter service. The Boeing 307's airline service was short-lived, as all were commandeered for military service when the United States entered World War II.

During World War II, most Clippers were pressed into military service. A new Pan Am subsidiary pioneered an air military supply route across the Atlantic from Brazil to West Africa. The onward flight to Sudan and Egypt tracked an existing British civil air route. In January 1942, the Pacific Clipper completed the first circumnavigation of the globe by a commercial airliner by accident as the attack on Pearl Harbor happened. Another first occurred in January 1943, when Franklin D. Roosevelt became the first US president to fly abroad in the Dixie Clipper. During this period Star Trek creator Gene Roddenberry was a Clipper pilot; he was aboard the Clipper Eclipse when it crashed in Syria on June 19, 1947.

While waiting at Foynes, Ireland, for a Pan Am Clipper flight to New York in 1942, passengers were served a drink today known as "Irish coffee" by Chef Joe Sheridan.

=== Post-war expansion and modernization ===
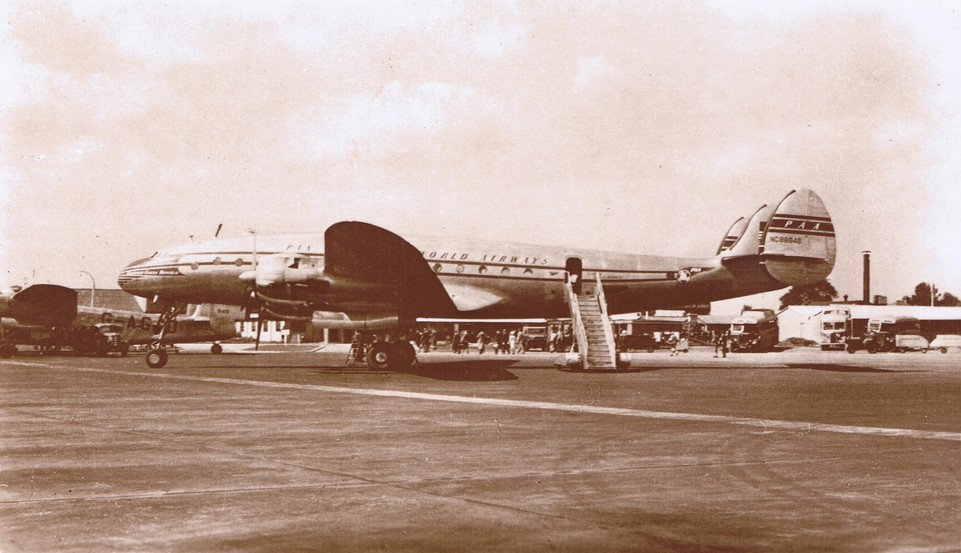
Pan Am Lockheed L-049 Constellation Clipper Great Republic at London Airport

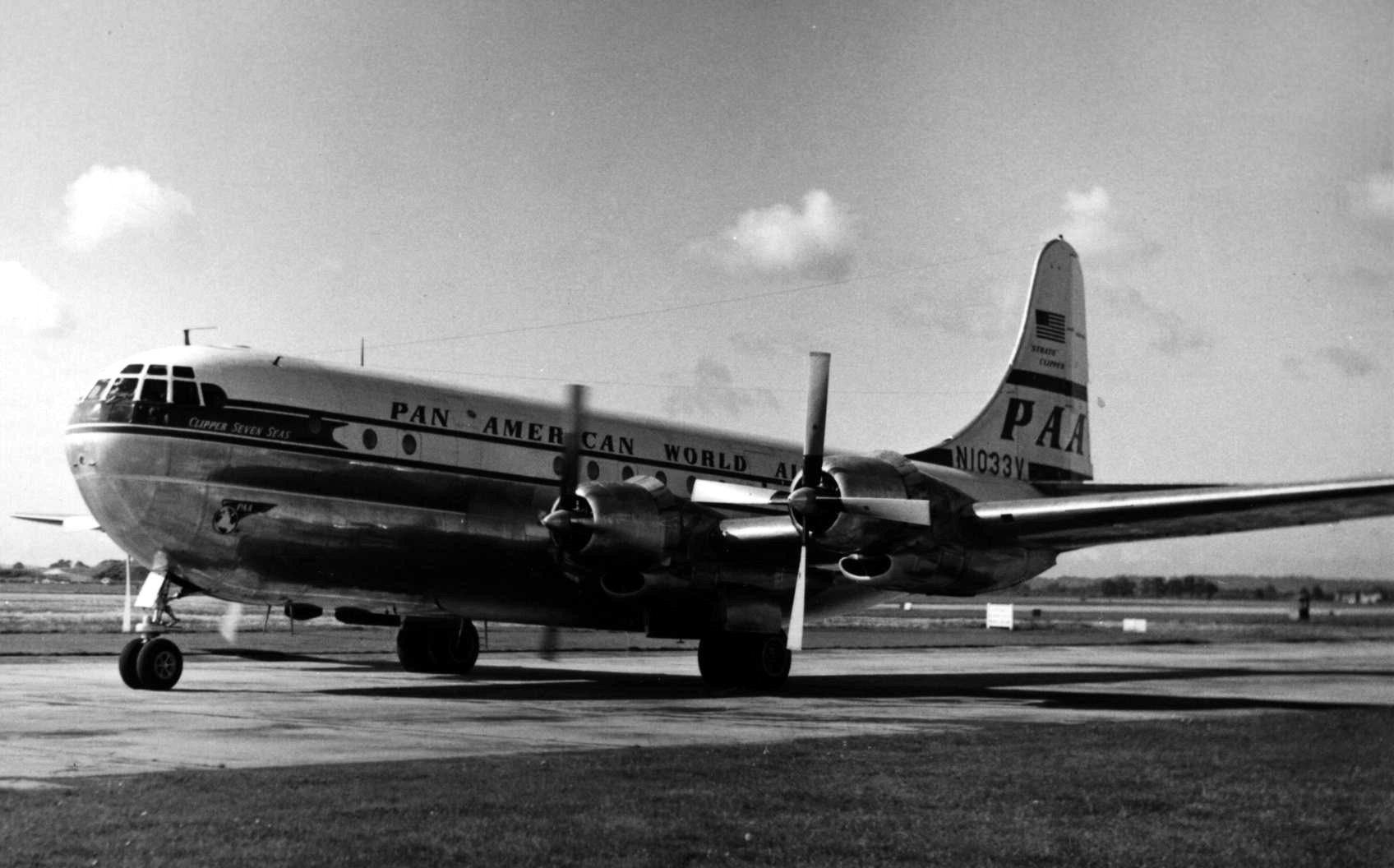
Pan Am Boeing 377 Stratocruiser Clipper Seven Seas at London Airport in 1954

The growing importance of air transport in the post-war era meant that Pan Am would no longer enjoy the official patronage it had been afforded in pre-war days to prevent the emergence of any meaningful competition, both at home and abroad.

Although Pan Am continued to use its political influence to lobby for protection of its position as America's primary international airline, it encountered increasing competition—first from American Export Airlines across the Atlantic to Europe, and subsequently from others, including TWA to Europe, Braniff to South America, United to Hawaii, and Northwest Orient to East Asia, as well as five potential rivals to Mexico and Central America. This changed situation resulted from the new post-war approach the Civil Aeronautics Board (CAB) took toward the promotion of competition between major US carriers on key domestic and international scheduled routes compared with pre-war US aviation policy.

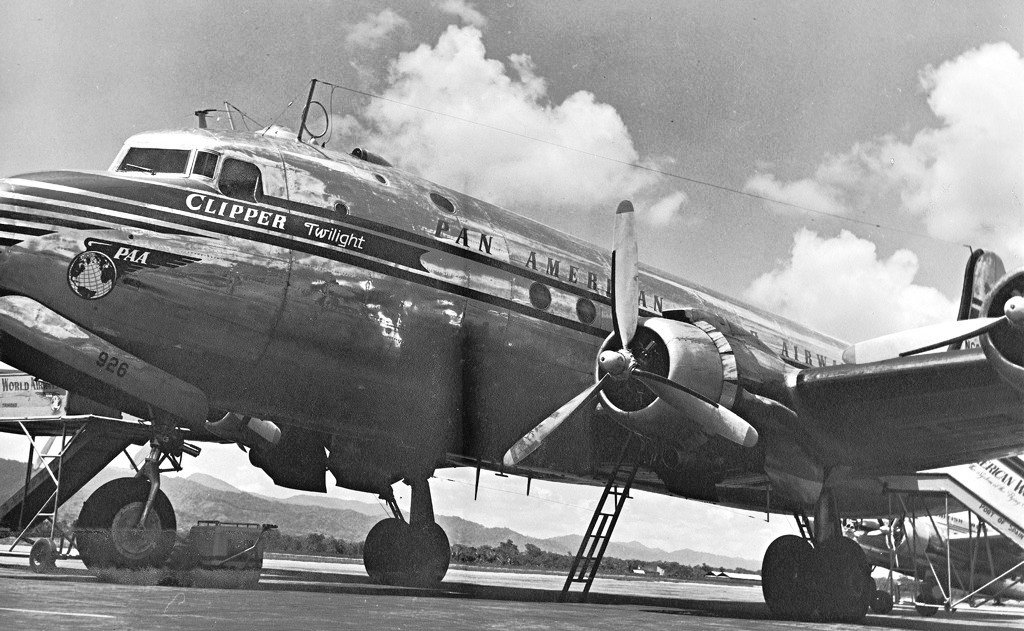
Pan American DC-4 at Piarco Airport, Trinidad in the 1950s

American Overseas Airlines (AOA) was the first airline to begin regular landplane flights across the Atlantic on October 24, 1945. In January 1946, Pan Am scheduled seven DC-4s a week east from LaGuardia Airport, five to London (Hurn Airport) and two to Lisbon. The time to Hurn was 17 hours and 40 minutes, including stops, or 20 hours and 45 minutes to Lisbon. A Boeing 314 flying boat flew from LaGuardia to Lisbon once every two weeks in 29 hours and 30 minutes; flying boat flights ended shortly thereafter. (Note: The 1/46 Air Traffic Guide shows the B314 to Lisbon, but a B314 book says PA's last transatlantic B314 was in December 1945.)

TWA's transatlantic challenge—the impending introduction of its faster, pressurized Lockheed Constellations—resulted in Pan Am ordering its own Constellation fleet at $750,000 (equivalent to $10.62 million in 2025) apiece. Pan Am began transatlantic Constellation flights on January 14, 1946, beating TWA by three weeks.

In January 1946, a flight from Miami to Buenos Aires took 71 hours and 15 minutes in a Pan Am DC-3, but the following summer, DC-4s flew Idlewild to Buenos Aires in 38 hours and 30 minutes. In January 1958, Pan Am's DC-7Bs flew New York to Buenos Aires in 25 hours and 20 minutes, while the National–Pan Am–Panagra DC-7B via Panama and Lima took 22 hours and 45 minutes. Convair 240s replaced DC-3s and other pre-war types on Pan Am's shorter flights in the Caribbean and South America. Pan Am also acquired a few Curtiss C-46s for a freight network that eventually extended to Buenos Aires.

In January 1946, Pan Am had no transpacific flights beyond Hawaii, but they soon resumed with DC-4s. In January 1958, the California to Tokyo flight was a daily Stratocruiser that took 31 hours 45 minutes from San Francisco or 32 hours 15 minutes from Los Angeles. (A flight to Seattle and a connection to Northwest's DC-7C totaled 24 hours and 13 minutes from San Francisco, but Pan Am was not allowed to fly that route.) The Stratocruisers' double-deck fuselage with sleeping berths and a lower-deck lounge helped it compete with its rival. "Super Stratocruisers" with more fuel appeared on Pan Am's transatlantic routes in November 1954, making nonstop eastward and one-stop westward schedules more reliable.

In June 1947, Pan Am started the first scheduled round-the-world airline flight. In September, the weekly DC-4 was scheduled to leave San Francisco at 10:00 pm Thursday as Flight 1, stopping at Honolulu, Midway, Wake, Guam, Manila, and Bangkok, and arriving in Calcutta on Monday at 12:45 pm, where it met Flight 2, a Constellation that had left New York at 11:30 pm Friday. The DC-4 returned to San Francisco as Flight 2; the Constellation left Calcutta at 1:30 pm Tuesday, stopped at Karachi, Istanbul, London, Shannon, and Gander, and arrived at LaGuardia Thursday at 2:55 pm. A few months later, PA 3 took over the Manila route, while PA 1 shifted to Tokyo and Shanghai. All Pan Am round-the-world flights included at least one change of plane until Boeing 707s took over in 1960. PA 1 became daily in 1962–63, making different en-route stops on different days of the week; in January 1963, it left San Francisco at 9 am daily and was scheduled into New York 56 hours and 10 minutes later. Los Angeles replaced San Francisco in 1968; when Boeing 747s finished replacing 707s in 1971, all stops except Tehran and Karachi were served daily in each direction. For a year or so in 1975–76, Pan Am finally completed the round-the-world trip, New York to New York.

In January 1950, Pan American Airways Corporation officially became Pan American World Airways, Inc. (The airline had begun calling itself Pan American World Airways in 1943.) In September 1950 Pan Am completed the $17.45 million (equivalent to $184.94 million in 2025) purchase of American Overseas Airlines from American Airlines. That month Pan Am ordered 45 Douglas DC-6Bs. The first, Clipper Liberty Bell (N6518C), inaugurated Pan Am's all-tourist-class Rainbow service between New York and London on May 1, 1952, to complement the all-first President Stratocruiser service. From June 1954, DC-6Bs began replacing DC-4s on Pan Am's internal German routes.

Pan Am introduced the Douglas DC-7C "Seven Seas" on transatlantic routes in summer 1956. In January 1958 the DC-7C nonstop took 10 hours and 45 minutes from Idlewild to London, enabling Pan Am to hold its own against TWA's Super Constellations and Starliners. In 1957, Pan Am started DC-7C flights direct from the West Coast of the United States to London and Paris, with a fuel stop in Canada or Greenland. The introduction of the faster Bristol Britannia turboprop by British Overseas Airways Corporation (BOAC) between New York and London on December 19, 1957, ended Pan Am's competitive leadership there.

In January 1958 Pan Am scheduled 47 flights a week east from Idlewild to Europe, Africa, the Middle East and beyond; the following August there were 65.

=== Jet age ===
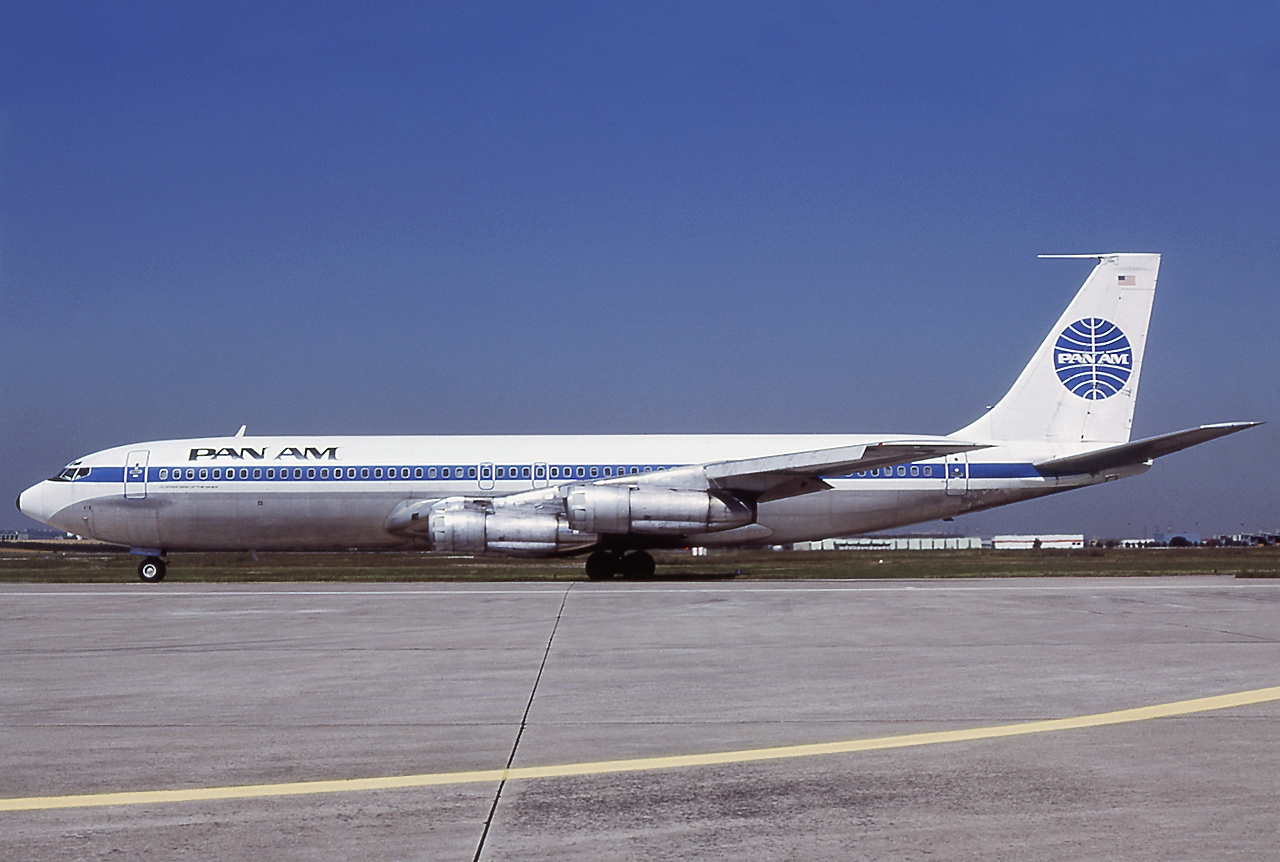
Boeing 707-321B of Pan American at Paris Orly Airport, 1979

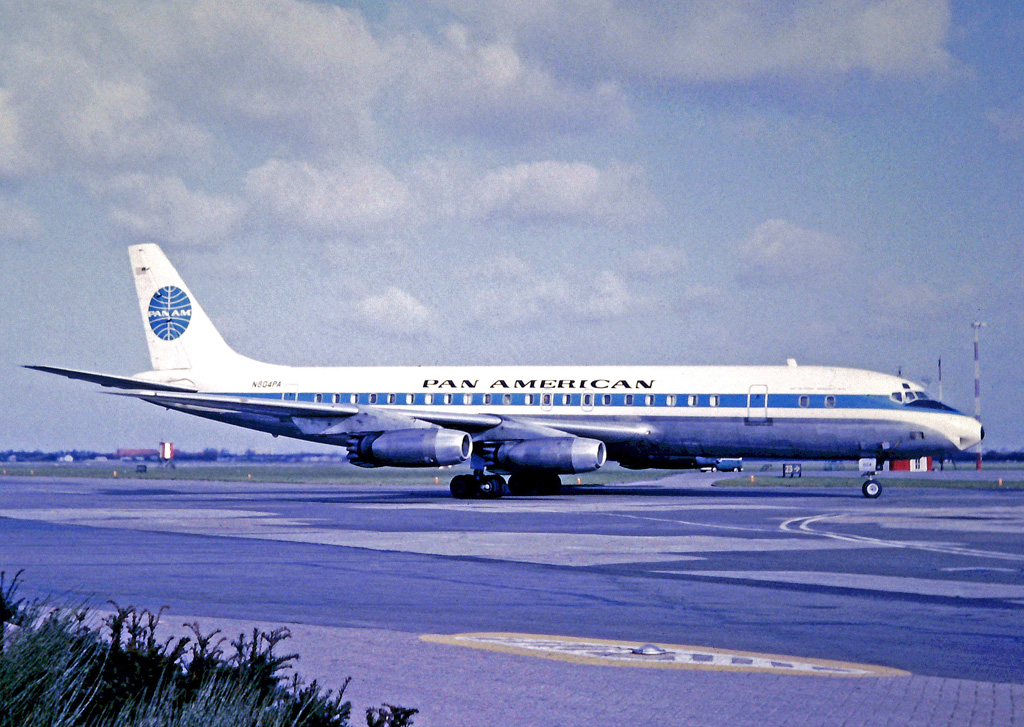
Douglas DC-8-32 of Pan American at Amsterdam Schiphol Airport in 1967

Pan Am considered purchasing the world's first jetliner, the British De Havilland Comet, but instead opted to become the Boeing 707 launch customer in 1955 with an order for 20. The 707 was originally to be 144 inches (370 cm) wide with five-abreast seating, but Boeing widened their design to match the DC-8.

Pan Am's first scheduled jet flight was from New York–Idlewild to Paris–Le Bourget, stopping at Gander to refuel, on October 26, 1958. The Boeing 707-121 Clipper America N711PA carried 111 passengers.

It also purchased 25 Douglas DC-8, which could also seat six across; the combined order value for these first 707s and DC-8s was $269 million.

Meanwhile, Boeing improved their aircraft with the introduction of the Boeing 707-320 "Intercontinental", offering greater payload and range. Pan Am started taking deliveries of the Intercontinental in 1959–1960, which, together with the Douglas DC-8s arriving in March 1960, enabled non-stop transatlantic crossings with a viable payload in both directions.

Pan Am eventually operated 19 Douglas DC-8s, disposing of them in 1970 after just ten years of service. Meanwhile, Pan Am went on to operate a much larger total of 120 Boeing 707-320 "Intercontinental" aircraft for just over 20 years, with this type becoming the mainstay of Pan Am operations until the arrival of the Boeing 747.

==== Widebody era ====
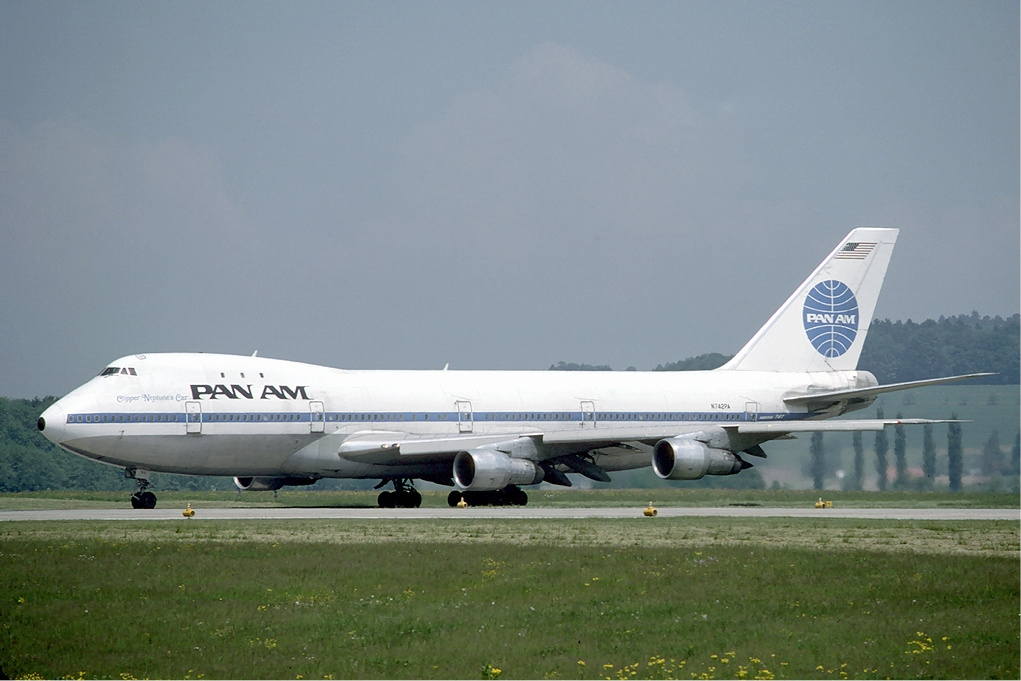
Boeing 747-100 Clipper Neptune's Car (N742PA) at Zurich Airport

Pan Am was a Boeing 747 launch customer, placing a $525 million (equivalent to $3.97 billion in 2025) order for 25 in April 1966.

On January 15, 1970, First Lady Pat Nixon christened Pan Am Boeing 747 Clipper Young America at Washington Dulles.

Pan Am's inaugural 747 service on the evening of January 21, 1970, was delayed for several hours by engine failure affecting the scheduled Clipper Young America. Clipper Victor was substituted for the flight from New York John F. Kennedy to London Heathrow (Clipper Victor was destroyed seven years later in the Tenerife air disaster in a collision with a KLM 747-200). While on the tarmac at Heathrow, two students from Aston University boarded the aircraft undetected and distributed rag mags in the passenger accommodation as a publicity stunt.

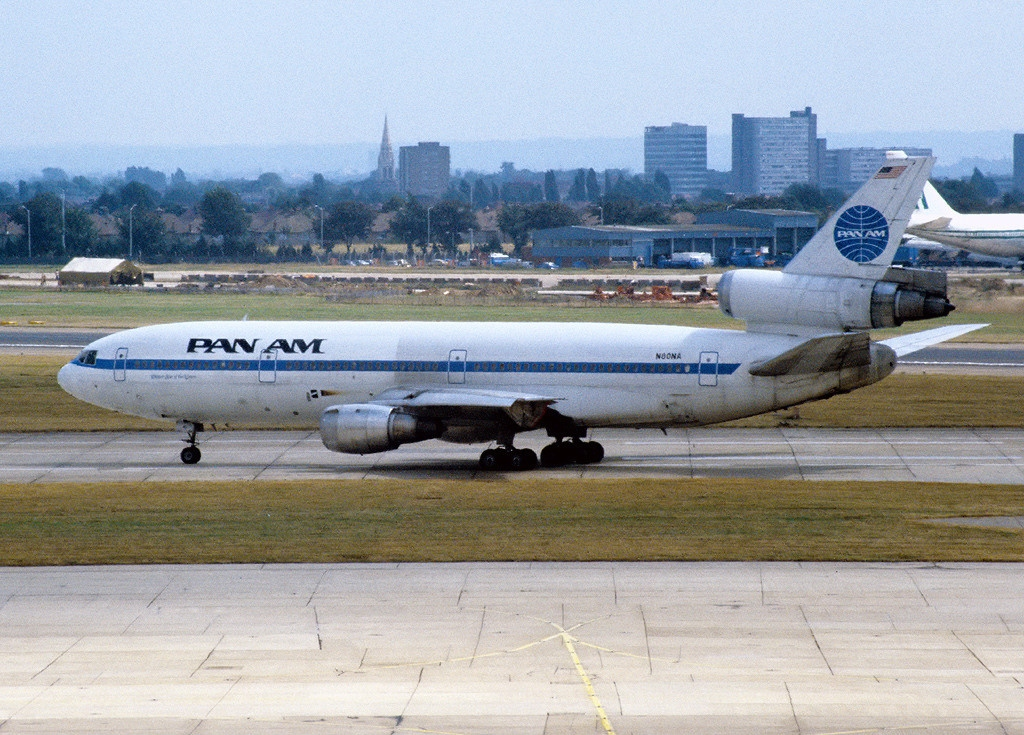
Pan Am McDonnell Douglas DC-10

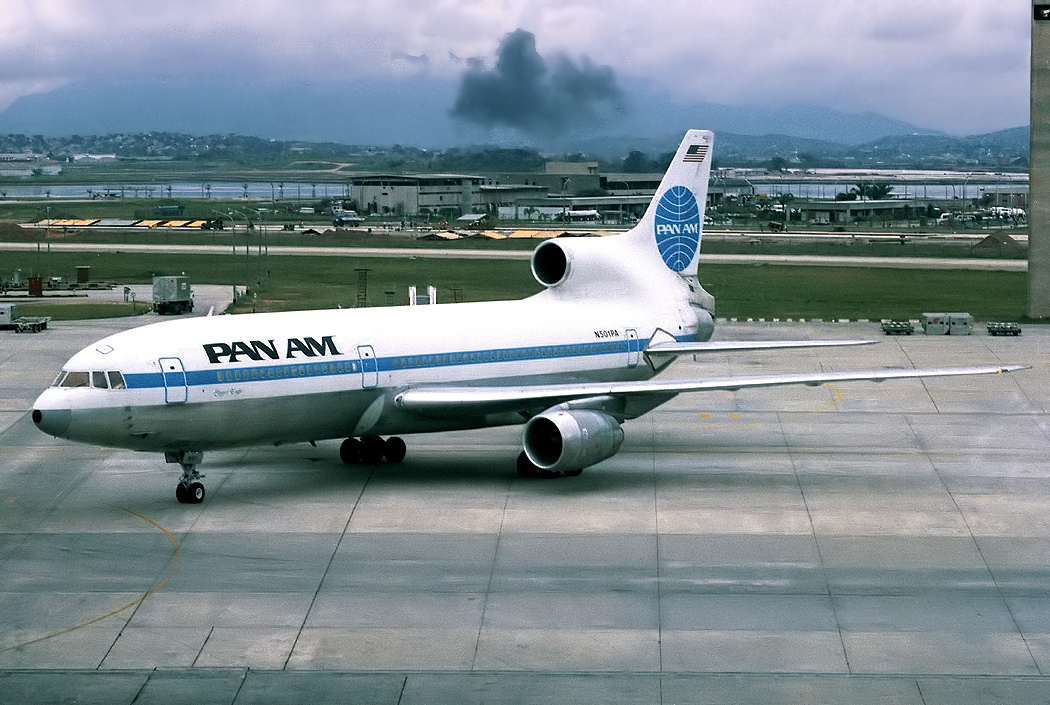
Pan Am Lockheed L-1011 Tristar

Pan Am carried 11 million passengers over 20 billion miles (3.2×10^{10} km; 1.7×10^{10} nmi) in 1970, the year it introduced wide-bodied airline travel. They also flew the Lockheed L-1011 Tristar and McDonnell Douglas DC-10.

==== Supersonic plans ====
Pan Am was one of the first three airlines to sign options for the Aérospatiale-BAC Concorde, but like other airlines that took out options—with the exception of BOAC and Air France—it did not purchase the supersonic jet. Pan Am was the first US airline to sign for the Boeing 2707, the American supersonic transport (SST) project, with 15 delivery positions reserved; these aircraft never saw service after Congress voted against additional funding in 1971.

=== Computerized reservations, Pan Am Building and Worldport ===
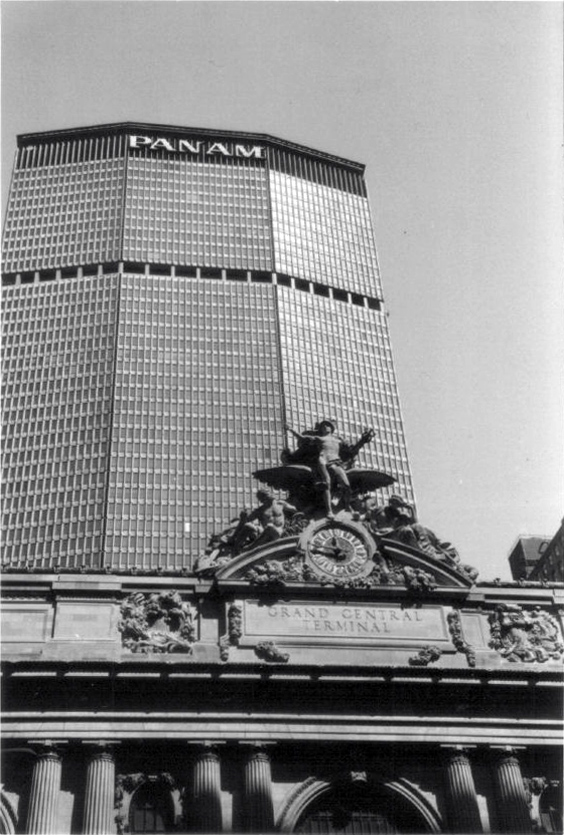
The Pan Am Building in Midtown Manhattan, now the MetLife Building, was Pan Am headquarters

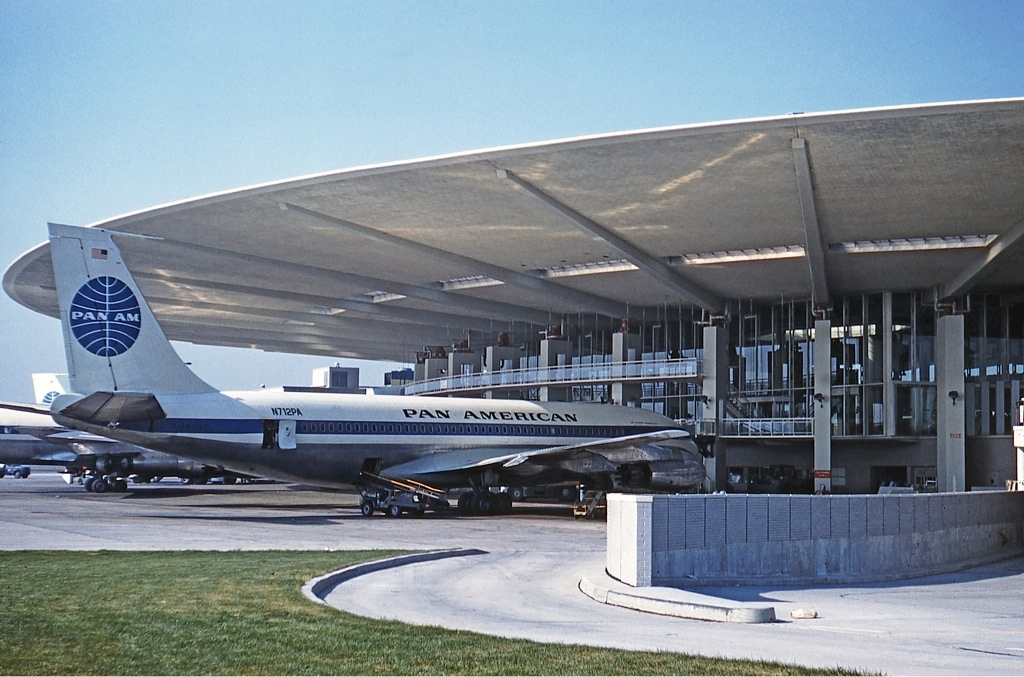
A Boeing 707-120 at the Pan Am Worldport in 1961. The terminal was once the center of the airline's New York operations.

Pan Am commissioned IBM to build PANAMAC, a large computer that booked airline and hotel reservations, which was installed in 1964. It also held large amounts of information about cities, countries, airports, aircraft, hotels, and restaurants.

The computer occupied the fourth floor of the Pan Am Building, which was the largest commercial office building in the world for some time.

The airline also built Worldport, a terminal building at John F. Kennedy Airport in New York. It was distinguished by its elliptical, 4-acre (16,000 m^{2}) roof, suspended far from the outside columns of the terminal below by 32 sets of steel posts and cables. The terminal was designed to allow passengers to board and disembark via stairs without getting wet by parking the nose of the aircraft under the overhang. The introduction of the jetbridge made this feature obsolete. The Worldport building was transferred to Delta Air Lines in 1991 and demolished by Delta and the Port Authority in 2013.

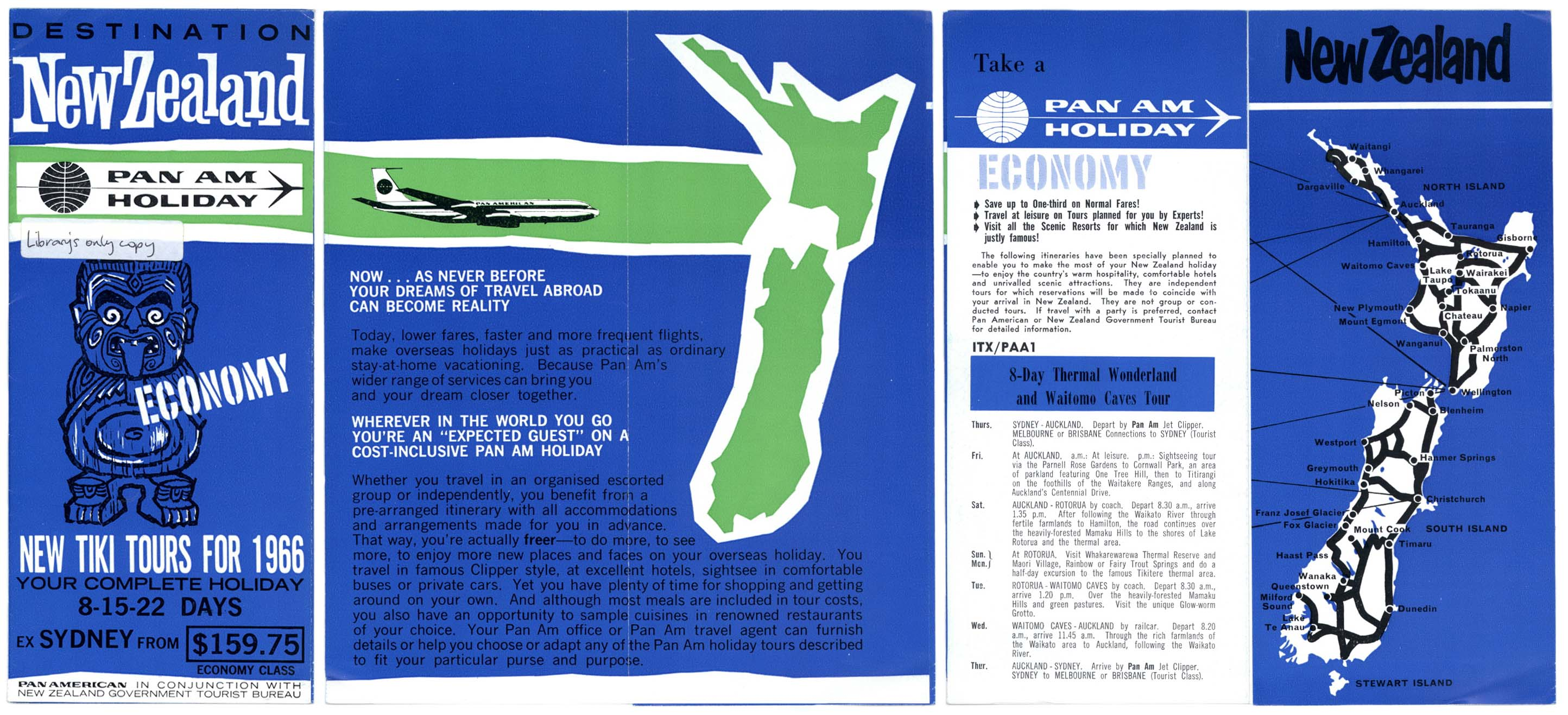
Pan Am Holiday pamphlet for destination New Zealand (1966)

=== Peak ===
At its peak in the late 1960s and early 1970s, Pan Am advertised under the slogan "The World's Most Experienced Airline." It carried 6.7 million passengers in 1966, and by 1968, its 150 jets flew to 86 countries on every continent except for Antarctica over a scheduled route network of 81,410 unduplicated miles (131,000 km). During that period, the airline was profitable, and its cash reserves totaled $1 billion (equivalent to $7.06 billion in 2025). Most routes were between New York, Europe, and South America and between Miami and the Caribbean. In 1964, Pan Am began a helicopter shuttle between New York's John F. Kennedy, LaGuardia, and Newark airports and Lower Manhattan, operated by New York Airways. Aside from the DC-8, the Boeing 707, and the 747, the Pan Am jet fleet included Boeing 720Bs and 727s (the first aircraft to sport "Pan Am" rather than "Pan American" titles). The airline later had Boeing 737s and 747SPs (which could fly nonstop from New York to Tokyo), Lockheed L-1011 Tristars, McDonnell-Douglas DC-10s, and Airbus A300s and A310s. Pan Am owned the InterContinental Hotel chain and had a financial interest in the Falcon Jet Corporation, which held marketing rights to the Dassault Falcon 20 business jet in North America. The airline was involved in creating a missile-tracking range in the South Atlantic and operating a nuclear-engine testing laboratory in Nevada. In addition, Pan Am participated in several notable humanitarian flights.

At its height, Pan Am was well regarded for its modern fleet, innovative cabin design, and experienced crews: cabin staff were multilingual and usually college graduates, hired from around the world, frequently with nursing training. Pan Am's onboard service and cuisine, inspired by Maxim's de Paris, were delivered "with a personal flair that has rarely been equaled."

=== Internal German Services (IGS) and other operations ===
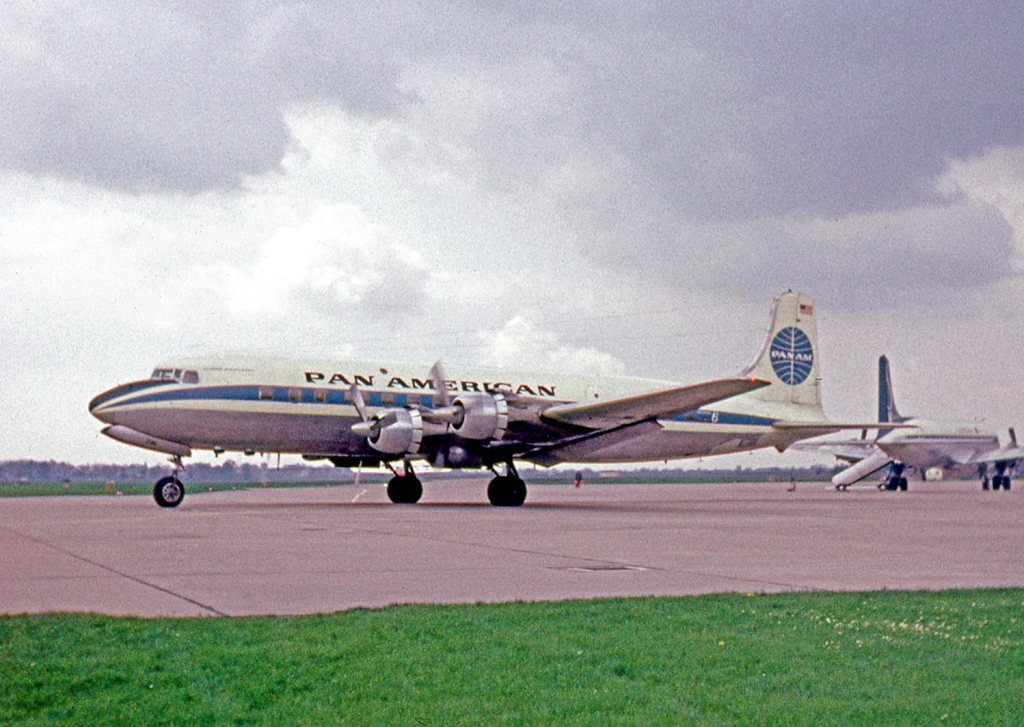
Pan American Douglas DC-6B operating an Internal German Service at Hanover Airport in May 1964.

From 1950 until 1990 Pan Am operated a comprehensive network of high-frequency, short-haul scheduled services between West Germany and West Berlin, first with Douglas DC-4s, then with DC-6Bs (from 1954) and Boeing 727s (from 1966). This situation had come about as a result of an agreement among the United States, the United Kingdom, France, and the Soviet Union at the end of World War II, which prohibited Germany from having its own airlines and restricted the provision of commercial air services from and to Berlin to air transport providers headquartered in these four countries. Rising Cold War tensions between the Soviet Union and the three Western powers resulted in unilateral Soviet withdrawal from the quadripartite Allied Control Commission in 1948, culminating in the division of Germany the following year. These events, together with Soviet insistence on a very narrow interpretation of the post-war agreement on the Western powers' access rights to Berlin, meant that until the end of the Cold War air transport in West Berlin continued to be confined to the carriers of the remaining Allied Control Commission powers, with aircraft required to fly across hostile East German territory through three 20 mi (32 km) wide air corridors at a maximum altitude of 10,000 ft (3,000 m). (Note: the cruising altitude of propliners employed on the Berlin Airlift) The airline's West Berlin operation consistently accounted for more than half of the city's entire commercial air traffic during that period.

For years, more passengers boarded Pan Am flights at Berlin Tempelhof than at any other airport. Pan Am operated a Berlin crew base of mainly German flight attendants and American pilots to staff its IGS flights. The German National flight attendants were later taken over by Lufthansa when it acquired Pan Am's Berlin route authorities. Over the years other local flight attendant bases outside the US included London for intra-Europe and transatlantic flying, Warsaw, Istanbul, and Belgrade for intra-Europe flights; a Tel Aviv base solely staffing the daily Tel-Aviv–Paris–Tel-Aviv service; a Nairobi base solely staffing the Nairobi–Frankfurt–Nairobi service; and Delhi and Bombay bases for India–Frankfurt flights.

Pan Am also operated Rest and Recreation (R&R) flights during the Vietnam War. These flights carried American service personnel for R&R leaves in Hong Kong, Tokyo, and other Asian cities.

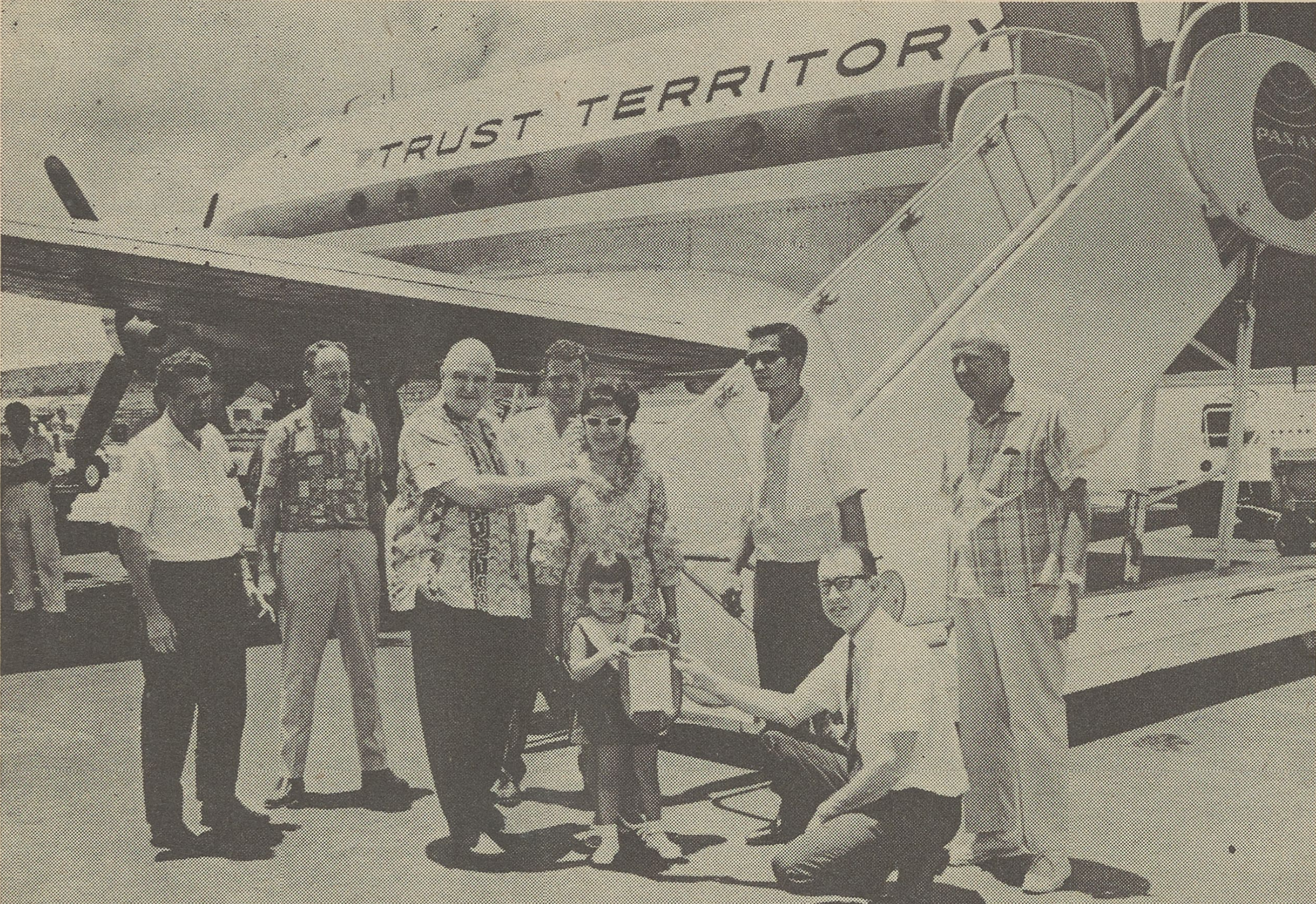
May 1968: last Pan Am-operated DC-4 flight of the Trust Territory Air Service, Guam

From 1960 to 1968, Pan Am operated flights on a contract basis for Trust Territory Air Service, a government-run airline for the Trust Territory of the Pacific Islands. Pan Am was responsible for operating the flights (performed with Douglas DC-4s and Grumman SA-16 amphibious aircraft, which Pan Am employees referred to as the "Clipper Duck") and performed line maintenance - the Trust Territory government was responsible for all other services. The successor service to this was Air Micronesia.

=== Passenger traffic (1951–1989) ===
Revenue passenger-miles (millions) (scheduled flights only)
Year	Pan American	National Airlines (NA)
1951	1,551	432
1955	2,676	905
1960	4,833	1,041
1965	8,869	2,663
1970	16,389	2,643
1975	14,863	3,865
1979	22,872	8,294
1981	28,924	(merged 1980)
1985	27,144	(merged 1980)
1989	29,359	(merged 1980)

In August 1953 PAA scheduled passenger flights to 106 airports; in May 1968 to 122 airports; in November 1978 to 65 airports (plus a few freight-only airports); in November 1985 to 98 airports; in November 1991 to 46 airports (plus 14 more with only "Pan Am Express" prop flights).

=== Downturn ===
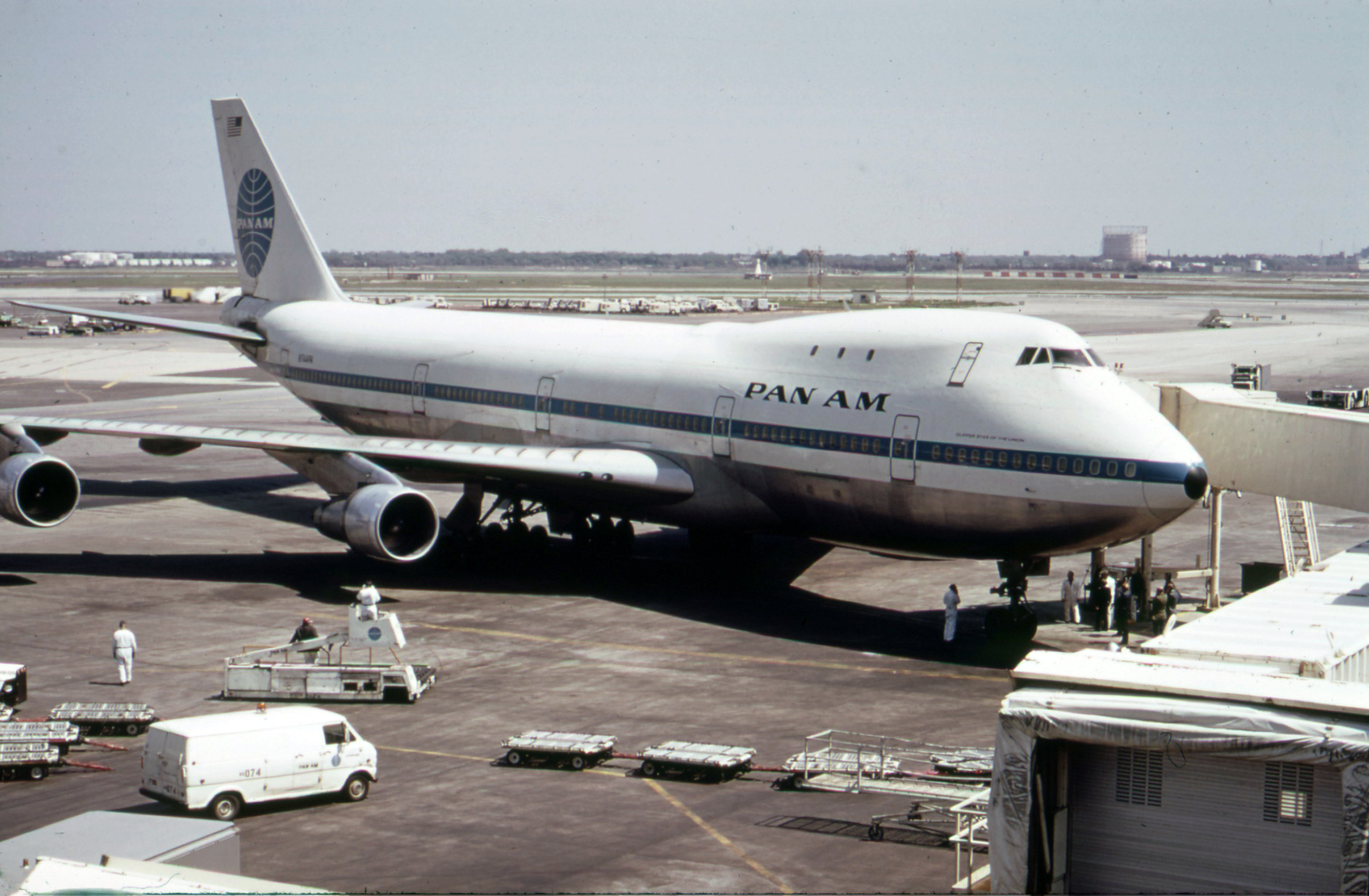
Pan Am Boeing 747-100 Clipper Star of the Union (N744PA) at John F. Kennedy Airport in May 1973

==== Fallout from 1973 oil crisis ====
Pan Am had invested in a large fleet of Boeing 747s, expecting that air travel would continue to increase. It did not, as the introduction of many wide-bodies by Pan Am and its competitors coincided with an economic slowdown. Reduced air travel after the 1973 oil crisis made the overcapacity problem worse. Pan Am was vulnerable, with its high overheads as a result of a large decentralized infrastructure. High fuel prices and its many older, less fuel-efficient narrow-bodied airplanes increased the airline's operating expenses. Federal route awards to other airlines, such as the Transpacific Route Case, further reduced the number of passengers Pan Am carried and its profit margins.

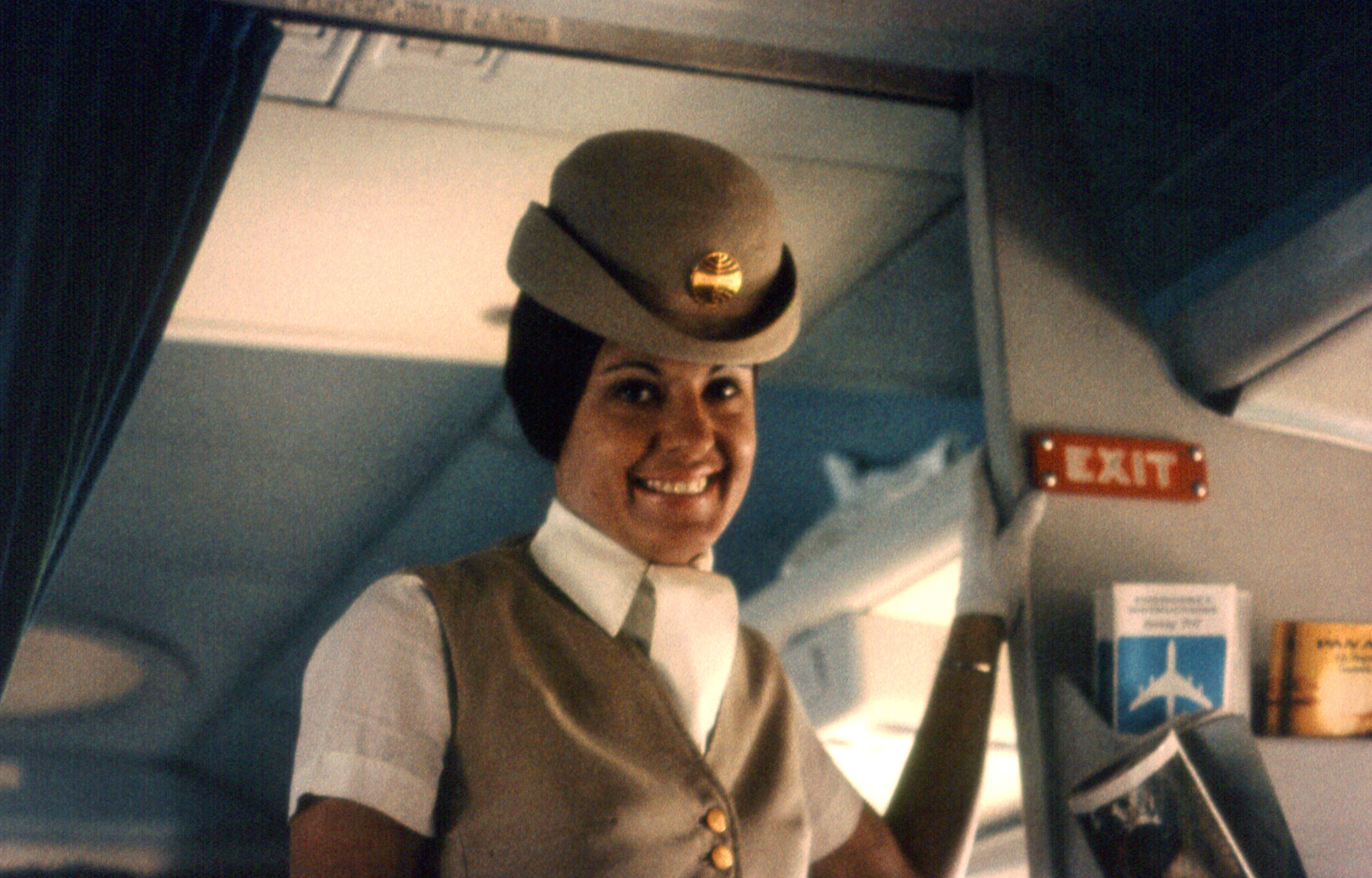
A Pan Am flight attendant in 1970s uniform

On September 23, 1974, a group of Pan Am employees published an advertisement in The New York Times to register their disagreement over federal policies that they felt were harming the financial viability of their employer. The ad cited discrepancies in airport landing fees, such as Pan Am paying $4,200 (equivalent to $21,302 in 2025) to land a plane in Sydney, while the Australian carrier, Qantas, paid only $178 to land a jet in Los Angeles. The ad also contended that the United States Postal Service was paying foreign airlines five times as much to carry US mail in comparison to Pan Am. Finally, the ad questioned why the Export–Import Bank of the United States loaned money to Japan, France, and Saudi Arabia at 6% interest while Pan Am paid 12%.

By 1976, Pan Am had racked up $364 million (equivalent to $1.6 billion in 2025) of accumulated losses over a ten year period, and its debts approached $1 billion (equivalent to $4.4 billion in 2025). This financial situation threatened the airline with bankruptcy. Former American Airlines vice president of operations William T. Seawell, who had replaced Najeeb Halaby as Pan Am president in 1972, began implementing a turnaround strategy: trimming the network by 25%, slashing the 40,000-strong workforce by 30%, cutting wages, introducing stringent economies and rescheduling debt, and reducing the size of the fleet. These measures, aided by the use of tax-loss credits, enabled Pan Am to avert financial collapse and return to profitability in 1977.

==== Attempts to build a US domestic network ====
Since the 1930s, Juan Trippe had coveted domestic routes for Pan Am. Through the late 1950s and early 1960s, and in the mid-1970s, there were talks of merging the airline with a domestic operator such as American Airlines, Eastern Air Lines, Trans World Airlines, or United Airlines. As rival airlines convinced Congress that Pan Am would use its political clout to monopolize US air routes, the CAB repeatedly denied the airline permission to operate in the US, either by growth or by a merger with another airline. Pan Am remained an American carrier operating international routes only (aside from Hawaii and Alaska). The last time Pan Am was permitted to merge with another airline prior to the deregulation of the US airline industry was in 1950, when it took over American Overseas Airlines from American Airlines. After deregulation in 1978, more US domestic airlines began competing with Pan Am internationally.

==== National Airlines takeover ====
To acquire domestic routes, Pan Am, under president Seawell, set its eyes on National Airlines. Pan Am wound up in a bidding war with Frank Lorenzo's Texas International Airlines, which boosted National's stock price, but Pan Am was granted permission to buy National in 1979 in what was described as the "Coup of the Decade". The acquisition of National Airlines for $437 million (equivalent to $1.56 billion in 2025), completed on January 7, 1980, further burdened Pan Am's balance sheet, already under strain after financing the Boeing 747s ordered in the mid-1960s. This acquisition did little to improve Pan Am's competitive position in relation to nimbler, lower-cost competitors in a deregulated industry, as National's north–south route structure provided insufficient feed at Pan Am's transatlantic and transpacific gateways in New York and Los Angeles. Apart from the Boeing 727, the airlines had incompatible fleets and corporate cultures. Pan Am management handled the integration poorly and presided over an increase in labor costs as a result of harmonizing National's pay scales with Pan Am's. Although revenues increased by 62% from 1979 to 1980, fuel costs from the merger increased by 157% during a weak economic climate. Further "miscellaneous expenses" increased by 74%.

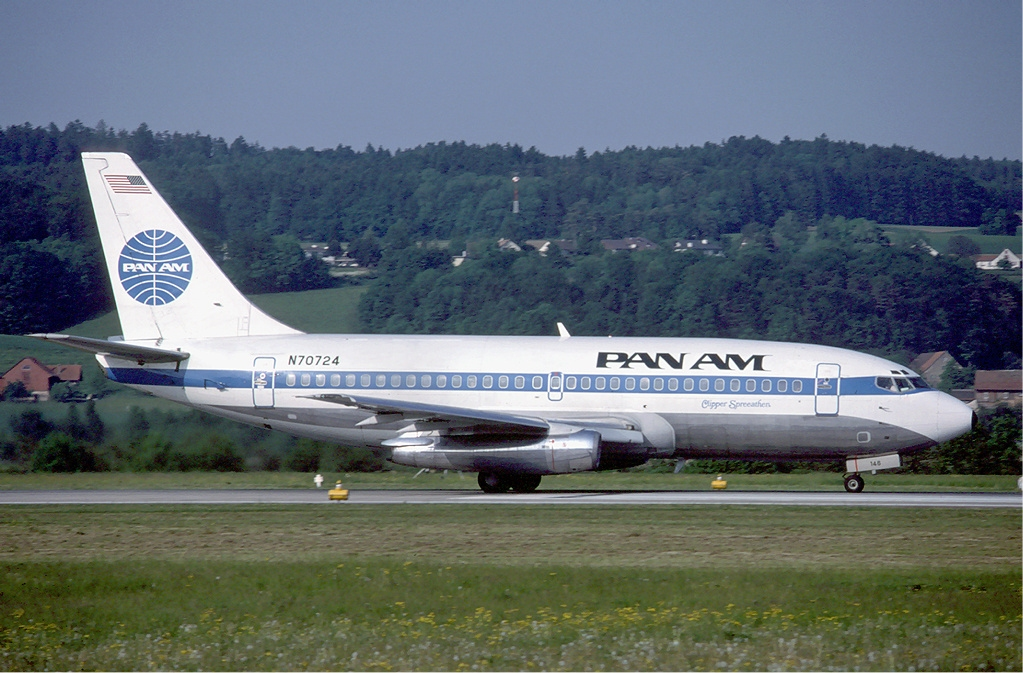
Boeing 737-200 Clipper Spreeathen (N70724) at Zurich in 1985

==== Disposal of non-core assets and operational cutbacks ====
As 1980 progressed and the airline's financial situation worsened, Seawell began selling Pan Am's non-core assets. The first asset to be sold off was the airline's 50% interest in Falcon Jet Corporation in August. Later in November, Pan Am sold the Pan Am Building to the Metropolitan Life Insurance Company for $400 million (equivalent to $1.31 billion in 2025). In September 1981, Pan Am sold off its InterContinental hotel chain. Before this transaction closed, Seawell was replaced by C. Edward Acker, Air Florida's founder and ex-president, as well as a former Braniff International executive. The combined sale value of the InterContinental chain and the Falcon Jet Corp. stake was $500 million (equivalent to $1.5 billion in 2025).

Acker followed up the asset disposal program he had inherited from his predecessor with operational cutbacks. Most prominent among these was the discontinuation of the round-the-world service from October 31, 1982, when Pan Am ceased flying between Delhi, Bangkok, and Hong Kong due to the sector's unprofitability. To provide additional seating capacity for its 1983 spring/summer season, the airline also acquired three passenger Boeing 747-200Bs from Flying Tigers, who took four of Pan Am's 747-100 freighters in return.

==== Fleet restructuring ====
Despite Pan Am's precarious financial situation, in the summer of 1984, Acker went ahead with an order for new Airbus models in wide-body and narrow-body aircraft, becoming the second American company to order Airbus aircraft, after Eastern Air Lines. These advanced aircraft, economically and operationally superior to the 747s and 727s Pan Am operated at the time, were intended to make the airline more competitive. In 1985, new A310-221s began replacing 727s on the Internal German Services (IGS), and A300s flew in the Caribbean networks later that year. From early 1986, additional new longer-range A310-222s replaced some of the 747s on the slimmed-down transatlantic network following ETOPS certification (approval by the Federal Aviation Administration (FAA) of transoceanic flying with twin-engined aircraft). The first A310 ETOPS transatlantic route was New York-JFK to Hamburg; Detroit to London followed shortly after that. Pan Am's decision not to take delivery of the A320s and to sell its delivery positions to Braniff meant that the majority of its short-haul US domestic and European feeder routes, and most of its IGS services, continued to be flown with obsolete 727s until the airline's demise. This put Pan Am at a disadvantage against rivals operating state-of-the-art aircraft with greater passenger appeal. In September 1984, Pan American World Airways created a holding company called Pan Am Corporation to assume ownership and control of the airline and the services division.

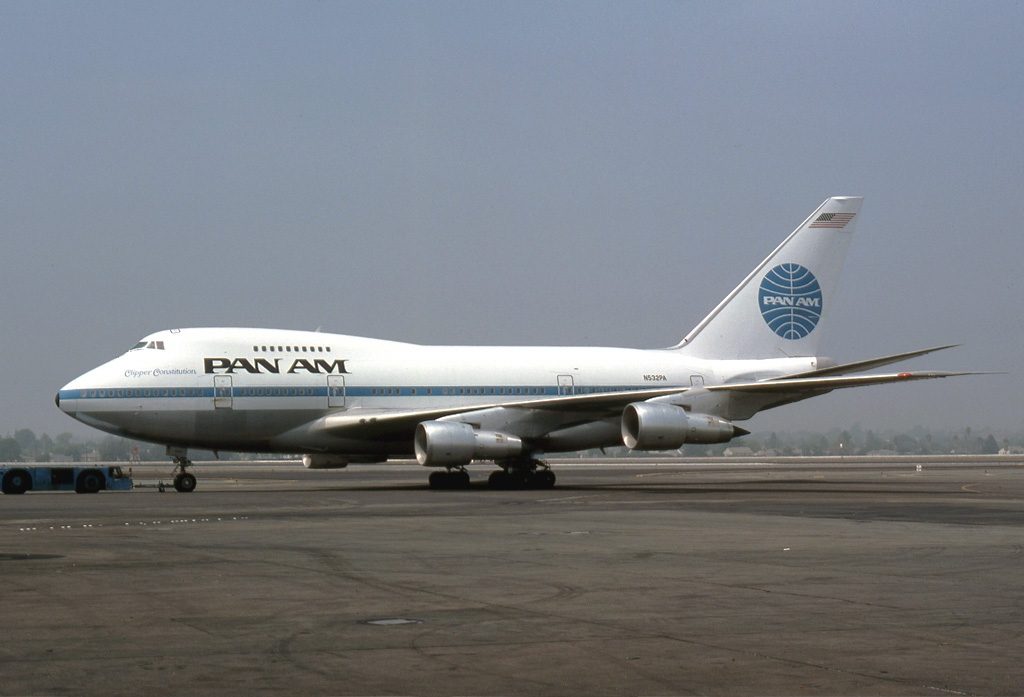
The Boeing 747SP-21 Clipper Constitution (N532PA) on July 1, 1976 at Los Angeles International Airport

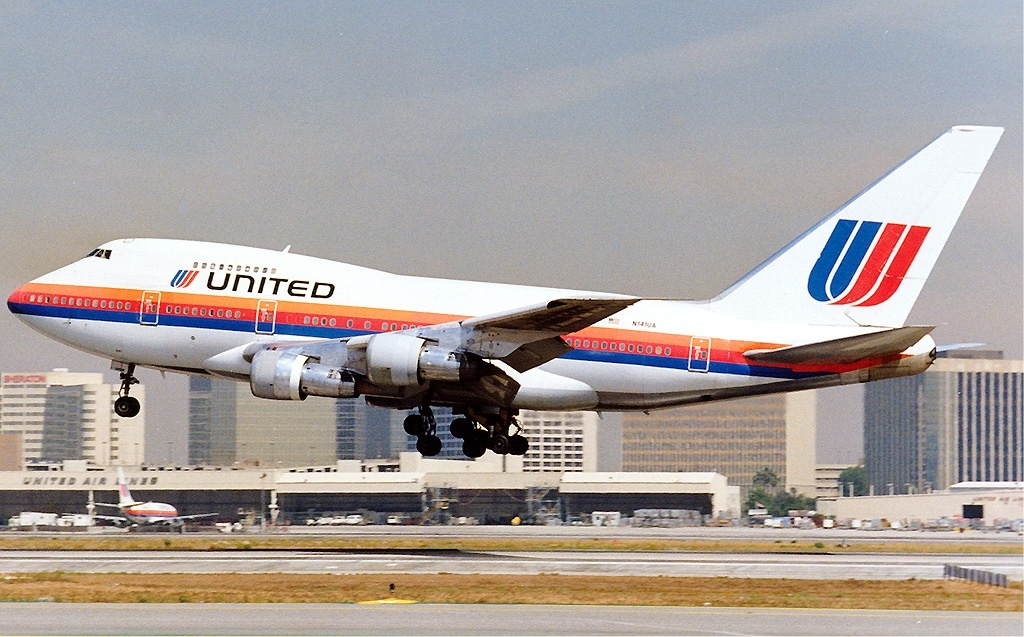
A Boeing 747SP-21 landing at Los Angeles International Airport in 1990

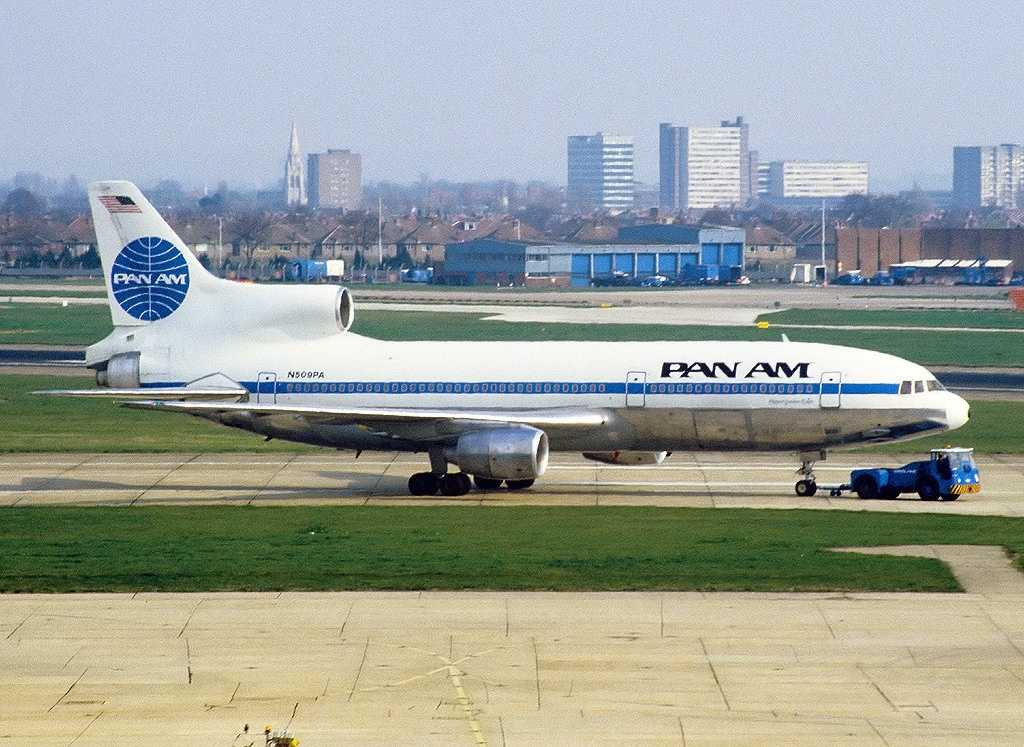
The L-1011-500 Clipper Golden Eagle (N509PA) in 1984

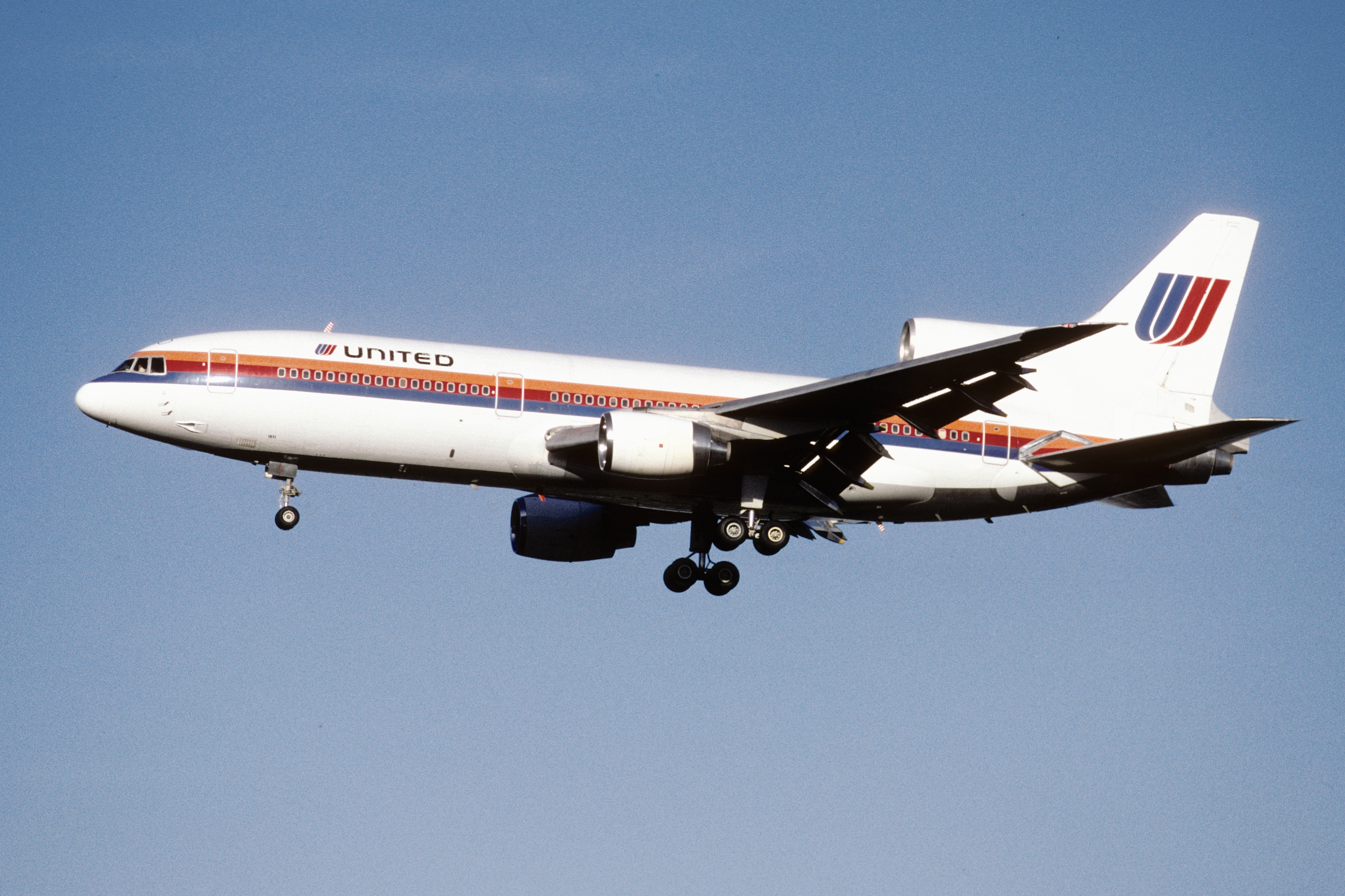
A Lockheed L-1011-500 of United Airlines after the sale of the Pan Am Pacific Division in 1985

==== Sale of Pacific Division ====
Given the airline's dire state, in April 1985, Acker sold Pan Am's entire Pacific Division, which consisted of 25% of its entire route system and its major hub at Tokyo-Narita to United Airlines for $750 million (equivalent to $1.9 billion in 2025). This sale also enabled Pan Am to address fleet incompatibility issues related to the earlier acquisition of National Airlines, as it included Pan Am's Pratt & Whitney JT9D-powered 747SPs, its Rolls-Royce RB211-powered L-1011-500s, and the General Electric CF6-powered DC-10s inherited from National, which were transferred to United along with the Pacific routes. The sale came the same year as a month-long strike held by the Transport Workers Union of America.

==== Establishment of local feeder networks ====
In the early 1980s, Pan Am contracted several regional airlines (Air Atlanta, Colgan Air, Emerald Air, Empire Airlines, Presidential Airways, and Republic Airlines) to operate feeder flights under the Pan Am Express branding.

The acquisition of Pennsylvania-based commuter airline Ransome Airlines for $65 million (equivalent to $161.69 million in 2025) (which was finalized in 1987) was meant to address the issue of providing additional feed for Pan Am's mainline services at its hubs in New York, Los Angeles, and Miami in the United States, and Berlin in Germany. The renamed Pan Am Express operated routes mostly from New York, as well as Berlin, Germany. Miami services were added in 1990. However, the regional Pan Am Express operation provided only an incremental feed to Pan Am's international route system, which was now focused on the Atlantic Division.

==== US east coast shuttle ====
In an attempt to gain a presence on the busy Washington–New York–Boston commuter air corridor, the Ransome acquisition was accompanied by the $100 million purchase of New York Air's shuttle service between Boston, New York, and Washington, D.C. This parallel move was intended to enable Pan Am to provide a high-frequency service for high-yield business travelers in direct competition with the long-established, successful Eastern Air Lines Shuttle operation. The renamed Pan Am Shuttle began operating out of LaGuardia Airport's refurbished historic Marine Air Terminal in October 1986. However, it did not address the pressing issue of Pan Am's continuing lack of a strong domestic feeder network.

==== Financial, operational and reputational setbacks ====
In 1987, Towers Financial Corporation, led by its CEO Steven Hoffenberg and his consultant Jeffrey Epstein, unsuccessfully tried to take over Pan Am in a corporate raid with Towers Financial as their raiding vessel. Their bid failed.

Thomas G. Plaskett, a former American Airlines and Continental executive, replaced Acker as president in January 1988 (joining Pan Am from the latter). While a program to refurbish Pan Am aircraft and improve the company's on-time performance began showing positive results (in fact, Pan Am's most profitable quarter ever was the third quarter of 1988), on December 21, 1988, the bombing of Pan Am flight 103 above Lockerbie, Scotland, resulted in 270 fatalities. Faced with a $300 million lawsuit filed by more than 100 families of the victims, the airline subpoenaed records of six US government agencies, including the CIA, the Drug Enforcement Administration, and the State Department. Though the records suggested that the US government was aware of warnings of a bombing and failed to pass the information to the airline, the families claimed Pan Am was attempting to shift the blame.

Also, in December 1988, the FAA fined Pan Am for 19 security failures out of the 236 that were detected amongst 29 airlines.

==== Failed bid for Northwest Airlines ====
In June 1989, Plaskett presented Northwest Airlines with a $2.7 billion takeover bid that was backed by Bankers Trust, Morgan Guaranty Trust, Citicorp, and Prudential-Bache. The proposed merger was Pan Am's final attempt to create a strong domestic network to provide sufficient feed for the two remaining mainline hubs at New York JFK and Miami. It was also intended to help the airline regain its status as a global airline by re-establishing a sizable transpacific presence. The merger was expected to result in annual savings of $240 million. However, billionaire financier Al Checchi outbid Pan Am by presenting Northwest's directors with a superior proposal.

==== Fallout from 1990–91 Persian Gulf War ====
The first Gulf War triggered by the Iraqi invasion of Kuwait on August 2, 1990, caused fuel prices to rise, which severely depressed global economic activity. The war in turn caused a sharp contraction of worldwide air travel demand, plunging once profitable operations, including Pan Am's prime transatlantic routes, into steep losses. These unforeseen events constituted a further major blow to Pan Am, which was still reeling from the 1988 Lockerbie disaster. To shore up its finances, Pan Am sold most of its routes serving London Heathrow—arguably Pan Am's most important international destination—to United Airlines with two Boeing 747s. This left Pan Am with only two daily London flights, serving Detroit and Miami, which both used Gatwick as their London terminal from the start of the 1990/91 winter timetable. Further asset disposals included Pan Am's sale of its IGS routes to Berlin to Lufthansa for $150 million (equivalent to $326.2 million in 2025), which became effective at the same time and brought the total value of asset disposals to $1.2 billion (equivalent to $2.61 billion in 2025). These measures were accompanied by the elimination of 2,500 jobs (8.6% of its workforce). These cutbacks were announced by the airline in September 1990.

=== Bankruptcy ===
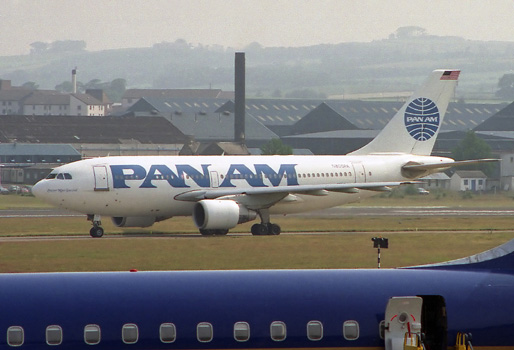
Clipper Miles Standish (N805PA), an Airbus A310

Pan Am was forced to file for bankruptcy protection on January 8, 1991. Delta Air Lines purchased the remaining profitable assets of Pan Am, including its remaining European routes (except one from Miami to Paris), and Frankfurt mini hub, the Shuttle operation, 45 jets, and the Pan Am Worldport at John F. Kennedy Airport, for $416 million. Delta also injected $100 million becoming a 45 percent owner of a reorganized but smaller Pan Am serving the Caribbean, Central and South America from a main hub in Miami. The airline's creditors would hold the other 55 percent.

The Boston–New York LaGuardia–Washington National Pan Am Shuttle service was taken over by Delta in September 1991. Two months later, Delta assumed all of Pan Am's remaining transatlantic traffic rights, except Miami to Paris and London. In November 1991, all members of Pan Am's frequent flyer program, WorldPass, were transferred, with their accumulated miles, to Delta's frequent flyer program, SkyMiles.

In October 1991, former Douglas Aircraft executive Russell Ray Jr. was hired as Pan Am's new president and CEO. As part of this restructuring, Pan Am relocated its headquarters from the Pan Am Building in New York City to new offices in the Miami area in preparation for the airline's relaunch from both Miami and New York on November 1. The new airline would have operated approximately 60 aircraft and generated about $1.2 billion in annual revenues with 7,500 employees. Following the relaunch, Pan Am continued to sustain heavy losses. Revenue throughout October and November 1991 fell short of what had been anticipated in the reorganization plan, with Delta claiming that Pan Am was losing $3 million a day. This undermined Delta's, Wall Street's and the traveling public's confidence in the viability of the reorganized Pan Am.

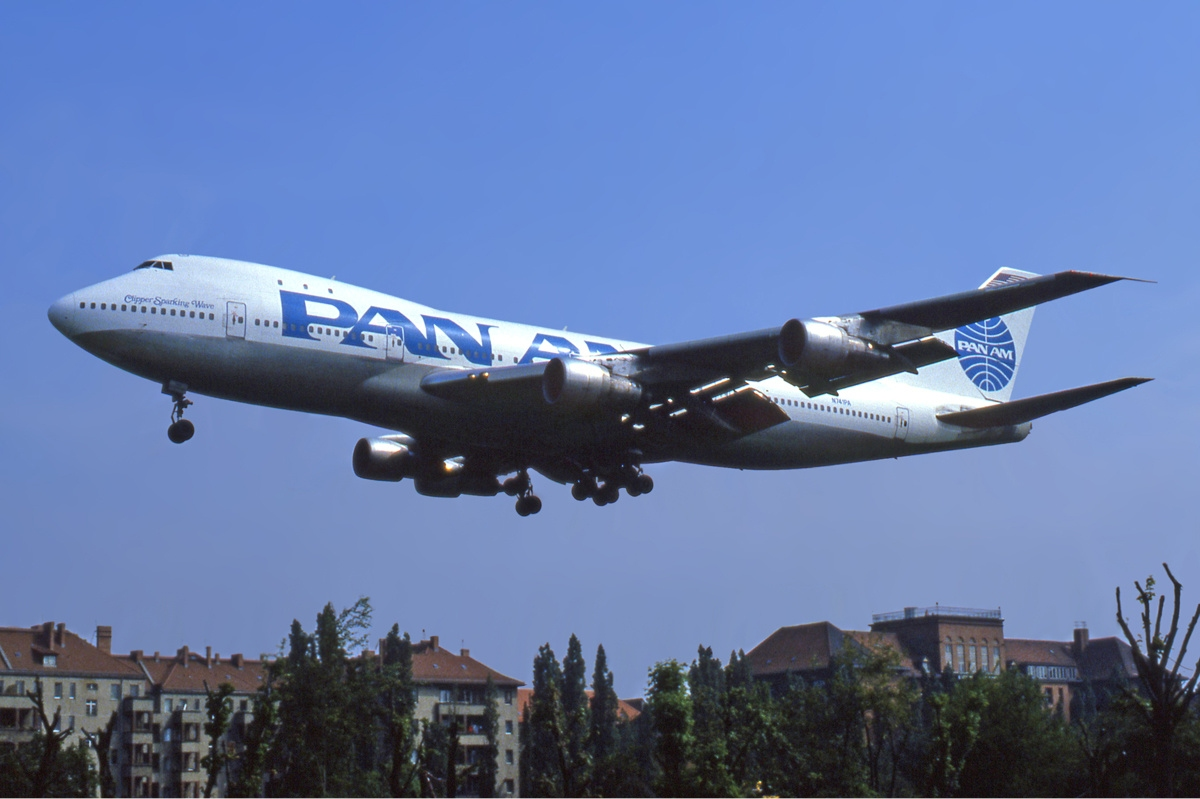
Clipper Sparking Wave (N741PA), a Boeing 747-100, on short final into Berlin Tempelhof Airport wearing Pan Am's final "billboard" style livery

Pan Am's senior executives outlined a projected shortfall of between $100 million and possibly $200 million, with the airline requiring a $25 million installment just to fly through the following week. On the evening of December 3, Pan Am's Creditors Committee advised US Bankruptcy Judge Cornelius Blackshear that it was close to convincing an airline (TWA) to invest $15 million to keep Pan Am operating. A deal with TWA owner Carl Icahn could not be struck. Pan Am opened for business at 9:00 am and within the hour, Ray was forced to withdraw Pan Am's plan of reorganization and execute an immediate shutdown plan for Pan Am.

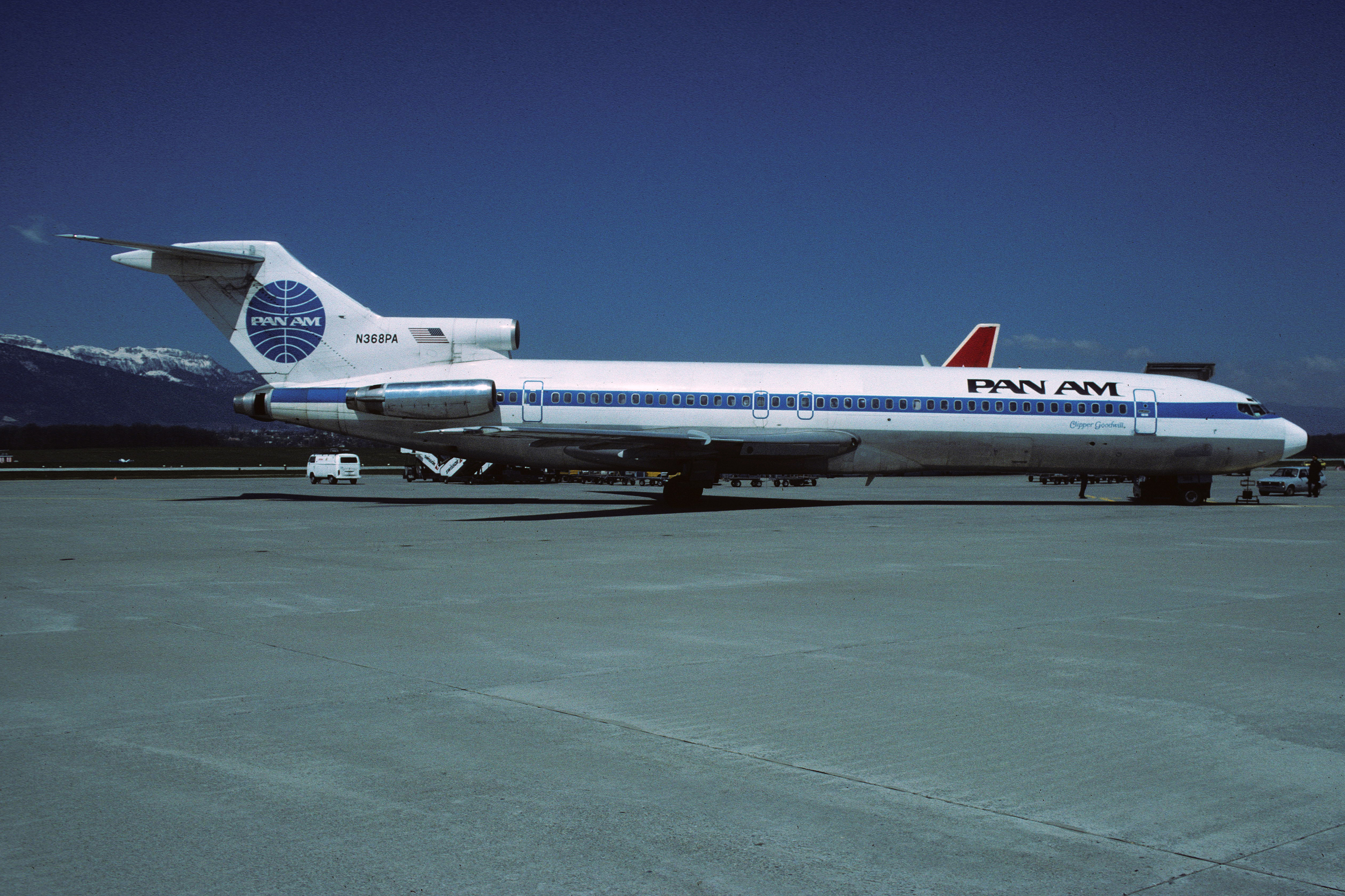
Clipper Goodwill (N368PA) at Geneva Airport in 1985, in a previous livery of Pan Am

Pan Am ceased operations on December 4, 1991, following a decision by Delta CEO Ron Allen and other senior executives not to go ahead with the final $25 million payment Pan Am was scheduled to receive the weekend after Thanksgiving. As a result, some 7,500 Pan Am employees lost their jobs, thousands of whom had worked in the New York City area and were preparing to move to the Miami area to work at Pan Am's new headquarters near Miami International Airport. Economists predicted that 9,000 jobs in the Miami area, including jobs at companies not connected to Pan Am that were dependent on the airline's presence, would be lost after it folded. The carrier's last flown scheduled operation was Pan Am flight 436 which departed that day from Bridgetown, Barbados, at 2 pm (EST) for Miami under the command of Captain Mark Pyle flying Clipper Goodwill, a Boeing 727-200 (N368PA).

Delta was sued for more than $2.5 billion on December 9, 1991, by the Pan Am Creditors Committee. Shortly thereafter, a large group of former Pan Am employees sued Delta. In December 1994, a federal judge ruled in favor of Delta, concluding that it was not liable for Pan Am's demise.

Pan Am was the third American major airline to shut down in 1991, after Eastern Air Lines and Midway Airlines.

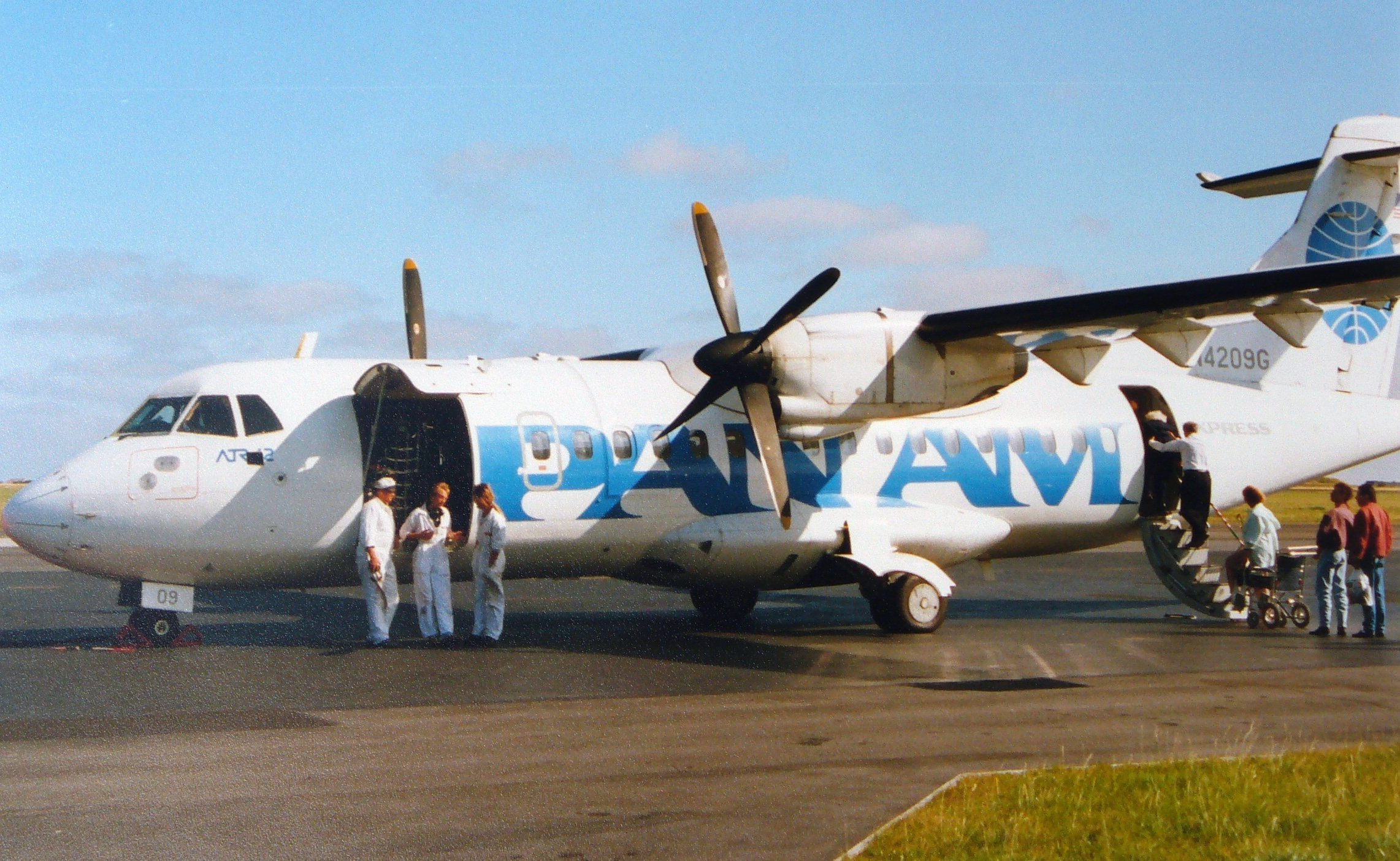
ATR 42 (N4209G) of Pan Am Express at Sylt Airport, 1991

After serving only two months as Pan Am's CEO, Ray was replaced by Peter McHugh to supervise the sale of Pan Am's remaining assets by Pan Am's Creditor's Committee. Pan Am's last remaining hub (at Miami International Airport) was split during the following years between United Airlines and American Airlines. TWA's Carl Icahn purchased Pan Am Express at a court-ordered bankruptcy auction for $13 million, renaming it Trans World Express. The Pan Am brand was sold to Charles Cobb, CEO of Cobb Partners and former United States Ambassador to the Republic of Iceland under President George H. W. Bush and Under Secretary of the US Department of Commerce under President Reagan. Cobb, along with Hanna-Frost partners, invested in a new Pan American World Airways headed by veteran airline executive Martin R. Shugrue Jr., a former Pan Am executive with 20 years of experience at the original carrier.

In his book, Pan Am: An Aviation Legend, Barnaby Conrad III contends that the collapse of the original Pan Am was a combination of corporate mismanagement, government indifference to protecting its prime international carrier, and flawed regulatory policy. He cites an observation made by former Pan Am Vice President for External Affairs, Stanley Gewirtz:

What could go wrong did. No one who followed Juan Trippe had the foresight to do something strongly positive … it was the most astonishing example of Murphy's law in extremis. The sale of Pan Am's profitable parts was inevitable to the company's destruction. There were not enough pieces to build on.

— Stanley Gewirtz

Under the terms of bankruptcy, the airline's International Flight Academy in Miami was permitted to remain open. It was established as an independent training organization beginning in 1992 under its current name, Pan Am International Flight Academy. The company began operating by using the flight simulation and type rating training center of the defunct Pan Am. In 2006, American Capital Strategies invested $58 million into the academy. Owned by the parent of Japanese airline All Nippon Airways as of October 2014, Pan Am International Flight Academy is the only surviving division of Pan American World Airways.

== Reuse of name ==
Aside from the aforementioned flight academy, the Pan Am brand has been resurrected four times since 1991, but the reincarnations were related to the original Pan Am in name only.

=== Airlines ===
Pan American World Airways trademarks and some assets were purchased by Eclipse Holdings, Inc., at an auction by the US Bankruptcy Court on December 2–3, 1993. The scheduled airline rights were sold to Pan American Airways on December 20–29, 1993, by Eclipse Holdings, which was to retain the Pan Am charter rights and operate through its subsidiary, Pan Am Charters, Inc., now Airways Corporation.

The first reincarnation of the original Pan Am operated from 1996 to 1998, with a focus on low-cost, long-distance flights between the United States and the Caribbean with the IATA airline designator PN. Eclipse Holdings (Pan Am II) later rescinded the Asset Purchase Agreement for cause and issued a cease and desist in January 1996, affecting all downstream transactions thereafter (as noted in US DOT proceeding OST-99-5945, SEC 10-Q dated August 24, 1997, Plan of Reorganization (S.D. FL), and others).

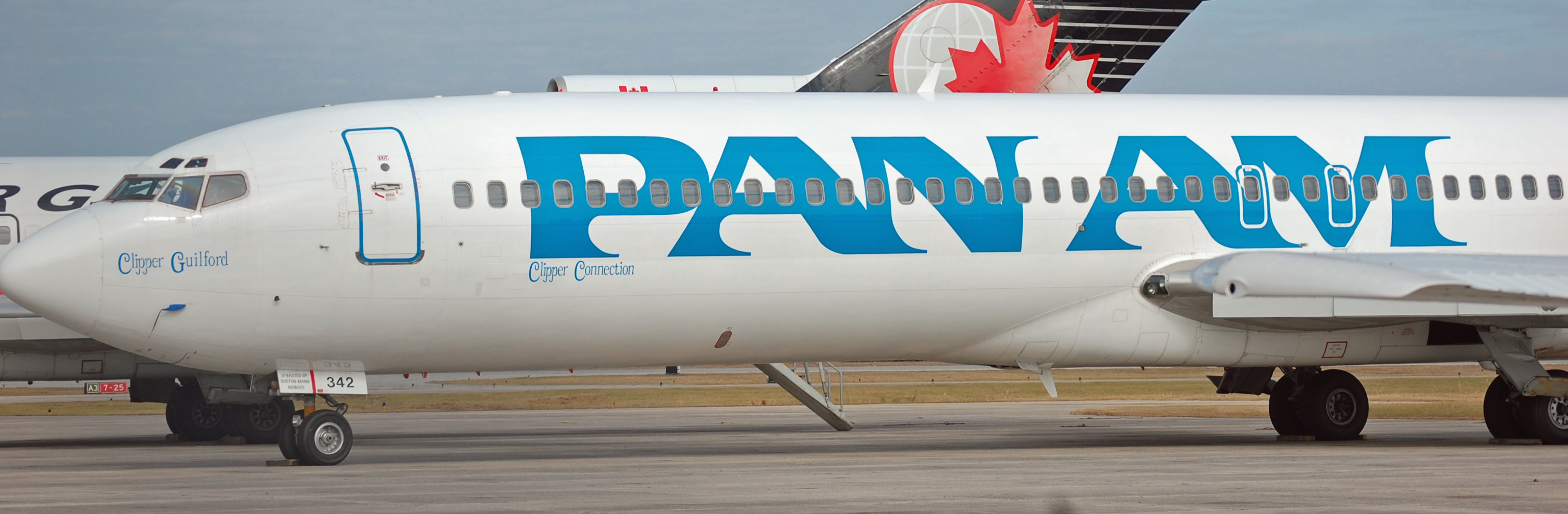
Pan Am Clipper Guilford (N342PA), Boeing 727-200

The second was unrelated to the first and was a small regional carrier based in Portsmouth, New Hampshire, which operated between 1998 and 2004. It found its niche in operating usually at smaller airports near major ones, such as Pease International (Portsmouth) and Gary Municipal Airport in Indiana. It used the IATA code PA and the ICAO code PAA.

Boston-Maine Airways, a sister company of the second reincarnation, operated the "Pan Am Clipper Connection" brand from 2004 to February 2008. A domestic airline in the Dominican Republic, descended from the company's first reincarnation, traded until March 23, 2012, as Pan Am Dominicana.

In November 2010, Pan American Airways, Incorporated, was resurrected for the fifth time by World-Wide Consolidated Logistics, Inc. The reincarnated operator is based at Brownsville/South Padre Island International Airport in Brownsville, Texas. The airline's inaugural flight was to Monterrey, Mexico, on November 12, 2010. The airline had said it would carry cargo only at first but intended to announce passenger service by 2011. Due to serious legal charges that were laid against the company's CEO Robert L. Hedrick in 2012, including child pornography offenses for which he was eventually convicted, the company lost its bid with the FAA to pursue passenger or cargo flights of any kind.

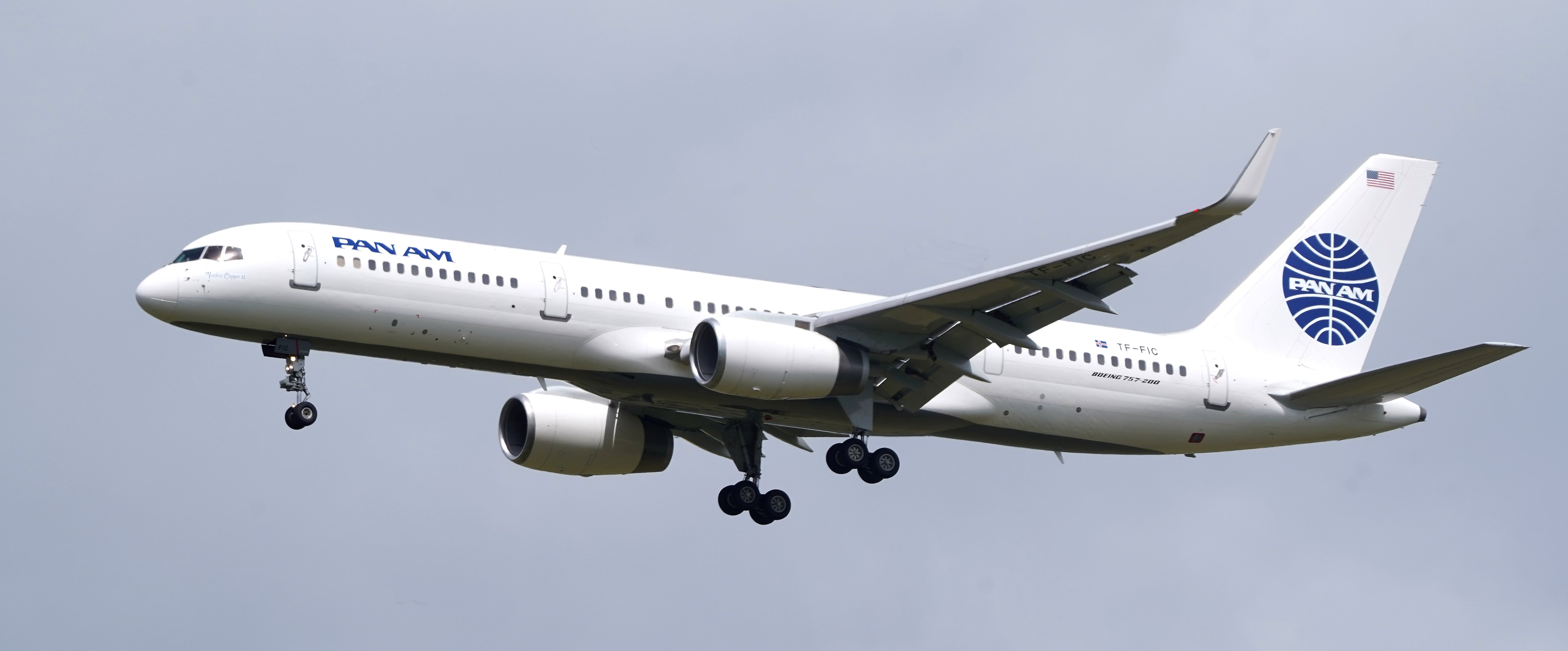
With the help of the Pan Am museum, the airline returned with a short-lived charter service using a Boeing 757 leased from Icelandair with a business-class 50-seat configuration

In 2025, Pan Am returned with a short-lived charter service with the help of the Pan Am museum. These transatlantic routes started on June 27 and ended on July 8 with a charter Boeing 757-200 with a business class 50-seat configuration.

=== Railways ===
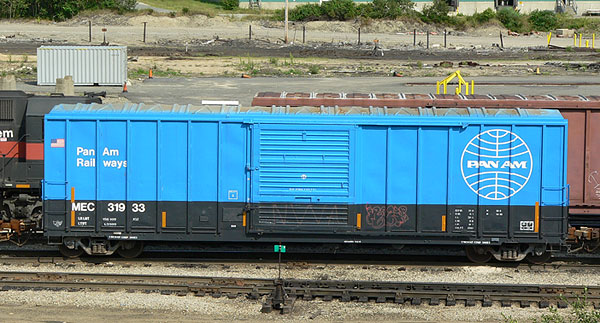
A former Maine Central boxcar painted in the new Pan Am Railways livery in 2005

In 1998, Guilford Transportation Industries purchased Pan American World Airways and all related naming rights and intellectual properties. The railway was later operated as Pan Am Railways. In 2022, the company was acquired by CSX Corporation.

=== Apparel ===
Korean fashion company SJ Group opened a Pan Am flagship store in Seoul in 2022 after acquiring a license to produce Pan Am-branded apparel and accessories.

=== Other ===
In 2020, Funko Games released a Pan Am board game, in which players play as airlines in competition with Pan Am.

In 2022, Timex released an exclusive watch with Pan Am branding. Due to the popularity, it was re-released in 2023.

In 2026, Christopher Ward released an exclusive limited edition watch with Pan Am branding.

=== Comeback ===
In June 2025, Pan Am Global Holdings, the entity managing the Pan Am brand, announced it was exploring the feasibility of reintroducing Pan Am as a scheduled commercial airline. The company partnered with aviation consulting firm AVi8 Air Capital to assess market dynamics, fleet strategy, and operational infrastructure for the potential relaunch. Craig Carter, CEO of Pan Am Global Holdings, stated that the initiative aims to honor Pan Am's legacy while adopting a sustainable and forward-thinking approach to modern air travel.

== Destinations ==
=== List of destinations served by Pan Am before closure ===
==== Europe ====
- France
  - Paris – Charles de Gaulle Airport

==== North America ====
- Antigua and Barbuda
  - Antigua – V. C. Bird International Airport
- Barbados
  - Bridgetown – Grantley Adams International Airport
- Bahamas
  - Nassau, Bahamas - Lynden Pindling International Airport
- Bermuda
  - Hamilton – L.F. Wade International Airport
- Costa Rica
  - San José – Juan Santamaría International Airport
- Dominican Republic
  - Punta Cana – Punta Cana International Airport
  - Santo Domingo – Las Américas International Airport
- Guatemala
  - Guatemala City – La Aurora International Airport
- Haiti
  - Port-au-Prince – Toussaint Louverture International Airport
- Jamaica
  - Kingston – Norman Manley International Airport
  - Montego Bay – Sangster International Airport
- Mexico
  - Mexico City – Mexico City International Airport
- Netherlands Antilles
  - Sint Maarten – Princess Juliana International Airport
- Panama
  - Panama City – Tocumen International Airport
- Trinidad and Tobago
  - Port of Spain – Piarco International Airport
- United States
  - Atlanta, Georgia – Hartsfield–Jackson Atlanta International Airport
  - Boston, Massachusetts – Logan International Airport
  - Chicago, Illinois – O'Hare International Airport
  - Dallas, Texas – Dallas Fort Worth International Airport
  - Detroit, Michigan – Detroit Metropolitan Wayne County Airport
  - Houston, Texas – George Bush Intercontinental Airport
  - Los Angeles, California – Los Angeles International Airport
  - Miami, Florida – Miami International Airport
  - New Orleans, Louisiana – Louis Armstrong New Orleans International Airport
  - New York City, New York
    - John F. Kennedy International Airport
    - LaGuardia Airport
  - Newark, New Jersey – Newark Liberty International Airport
  - Orlando, Florida – Orlando International Airport
  - San Francisco, California – San Francisco International Airport
  - Tampa, Florida – Tampa International Airport
  - Washington, D.C. – Ronald Reagan Washington National Airport
- Puerto Rico
  - San Juan – Luis Muñoz Marín International Airport
- United States Virgin Islands
  - Saint Croix – Henry E. Rohlsen Airport
  - Saint Thomas – Cyril E. King Airport

==== South America ====
- Argentina
  - Buenos Aires – Ministro Pistarini International Airport
- Brazil
  - Recife – Recife/Guararapes–Gilberto Freyre International Airport
  - Rio de Janeiro – Rio de Janeiro/Galeão International Airport
  - São Paulo – São Paulo/Guarulhos International Airport
- Chile
  - Santiago – Arturo Merino Benítez International Airport
- Peru
  - Lima - Jorge Chávez International Airport
- Uruguay
  - Montevideo – Carrasco International Airport
- Venezuela
  - Caracas – Simón Bolívar International Airport (Venezuela)
  - Maracaibo – La Chinita International Airport

=== List of destinations served by Pan Am at its peak ===
==== Africa ====
- Cameroon
  - Douala – Douala International Airport
- Dahomey
  - Cotonou – Cadjehoun Airport
- Democratic Republic of the Congo
  - Kinshasa – N'djili Airport
- Gabon
  - Libreville – Léon-Mba International Airport
- Ghana
  - Accra – Accra International Airport
- Ivory Coast
  - Abidjan – Félix-Houphouët-Boigny International Airport
- Kenya
  - Nairobi – Jomo Kenyatta International Airport
- Liberia
  - Monrovia – Roberts International Airport
- Nigeria
  - Lagos – Murtala Muhammed International Airport
- Senegal
  - Dakar – Léopold Sédar Senghor International Airport
- South Africa
  - Johannesburg – O. R. Tambo International Airport
- Tanzania
  - Dar es Salaam – Julius Nyerere International Airport
- Uganda
  - Entebbe – Entebbe International Airport

==== Asia ====
- Burma
  - Rangoon – Yangon International Airport
- China
  - Beijing – Beijing Capital International Airport
  - Shanghai
    - Shanghai Longhua Airport
    - Shanghai Hongqiao International Airport
- Hong Kong
  - Hong Kong – Kai Tak Airport
- India
  - Bombay – Chhatrapati Shivaji Maharaj International Airport
  - Calcutta – Netaji Subhas Chandra Bose International Airport
  - Delhi – Indira Gandhi International Airport
- Indonesia
  - Denpasar – Ngurah Rai International Airport
  - Jakarta
    - Kemayoran Airport
    - Halim Perdanakusuma International Airport
- Iran
  - Tehran – Mehrabad International Airport
- Israel
  - Tel Aviv – Ben Gurion Airport
- Japan
  - Osaka – Itami Airport
  - Tokyo
    - Haneda Airport
    - Narita International Airport
- Lebanon
  - Beirut – Beirut–Rafic Hariri International Airport
- Malaysia
  - Kuala Lumpur – Subang International Airport
  - Penang – Penang International Airport
- Pakistan
  - Karachi – Jinnah International Airport
  - Rawalpindi – Benazir Bhutto International Airport
- Philippines
  - Manila – Ninoy Aquino International Airport
- Singapore
  - Kallang Airport
  - Paya Lebar Airport
- South Korea
  - Seoul – Gimpo International Airport
- South Vietnam
  - Saigon – Tan Son Nhat International Airport
- Syria
  - Damascus – Damascus International Airport
- Taiwan
  - Taipei
    - Songshan Airport
    - Chiang Kai-shek International Airport
- Thailand
  - Bangkok – Don Mueang International Airport
- Turkey
  - Ankara – Ankara Esenboğa Airport
  - Istanbul – Atatürk Airport

==== Europe ====
- Austria
  - Vienna – Vienna International Airport
- Belgium
  - Brussels – Brussels Airport
- Czechoslovakia
  - Prague – Václav Havel Airport Prague
- Denmark
  - Copenhagen – Copenhagen Airport
- Finland
  - Helsinki – Helsinki Airport
- France
  - Nice – Nice Côte d'Azur Airport
  - Paris
    - Paris–Le Bourget Airport
    - Orly Airport
    - Charles de Gaulle Airport
- Iceland
  - Keflavík – Keflavík International Airport
- Italy
  - Milan – Milan Malpensa Airport
  - Rome – Rome Fiumicino Airport
- Sweden
  - Stockholm – Stockholm Arlanda Airport
- Netherlands
  - Amsterdam – Amsterdam Airport Schiphol
- Norway
  - Bergen – Bergen Airport, Flesland
- Poland
  - Warsaw – Warsaw Chopin Airport
  - Kraków - John Paul II International Airport
- Portugal
  - Lisbon – Lisbon Airport
  - Santa Maria Island, Azores – Santa Maria Airport
- Republic of Ireland
  - Shannon – Shannon Airport
- Romania
  - Bucharest – Bucharest Henri Coandă International Airport
- Spain
  - Madrid – Madrid–Barajas Airport
  - Barcelona – Josep Tarradellas Barcelona–El Prat Airport
- Soviet Union
  - Moscow – Sheremetyevo International Airport
  - Leningrad - Pulkovo Airport
- United Kingdom
  - Glasgow, Scotland – Glasgow Prestwick Airport
  - London, England
    - Heathrow Airport
    - Gatwick Airport
- West Germany
  - Berlin
    - Berlin Tegel Airport
    - Berlin Tempelhof Airport
  - Cologne – Cologne Bonn Airport
  - Düsseldorf – Düsseldorf Airport
  - Frankfurt – Frankfurt Airport
  - Hamburg – Hamburg Airport
  - Hanover – Hannover Airport
  - Nuremberg – Nuremberg Airport
  - Stuttgart – Stuttgart Airport
- Yugoslavia
  - Belgrade – Belgrade Nikola Tesla Airport

==== North America ====
- Antigua and Barbuda
  - Antigua – V. C. Bird International Airport
- Barbados
  - Bridgetown – Grantley Adams International Airport
- Bermuda
  - Hamilton – L.F. Wade International Airport
- Canada
  - Gander, Newfoundland and Labrador – Gander International Airport
- Costa Rica
  - San José – Juan Santamaría International Airport
- Dominican Republic
  - Santo Domingo – Las Américas International Airport
- Guadeloupe
  - Pointe-à-Pitre – Pointe-à-Pitre International Airport
- Guatemala
  - Guatemala City – La Aurora International Airport
- Haiti
  - Port-au-Prince – Toussaint Louverture International Airport
- Honduras
  - Tegucigalpa – Toncontín International Airport
- Jamaica
  - Kingston – Norman Manley International Airport
  - Montego Bay – Sangster International Airport
- Martinique
  - Fort-de-France – Martinique Aimé Césaire International Airport
- Mexico
  - Mérida – Mérida International Airport
  - Mexico City – Mexico City International Airport
- Netherlands Antilles
  - Curaçao – Curaçao International Airport
  - Sint Maarten – Princess Juliana International Airport
- Nicaragua
  - Managua – Augusto C. Sandino International Airport
- Panama
  - Panama City – Tocumen International Airport
- Puerto Rico
  - San Juan – Luis Muñoz Marín International Airport
- The Bahamas
  - Nassau – Lynden Pindling International Airport
- Trinidad and Tobago
  - Port of Spain – Piarco International Airport
- United States
  - Atlanta, Georgia – Hartsfield–Jackson Atlanta International Airport
  - Baltimore, Maryland – Baltimore/Washington International Airport
  - Boston, Massachusetts – Logan International Airport
  - Chicago, Illinois – O'Hare International Airport
  - Dallas, Texas – Dallas Love Field
  - Detroit, Michigan – Detroit Metropolitan Wayne County Airport
  - Fairbanks, Alaska – Fairbanks International Airport
  - Hilo, Hawaii – Hilo International Airport
  - Honolulu, Hawaii – Daniel K. Inouye International Airport
  - Houston, Texas – William P. Hobby Airport
  - Juneau, Alaska – Juneau International Airport
  - Los Angeles, California – Los Angeles International Airport
  - Miami, Florida – Miami International Airport
  - Minneapolis, Minnesota – Minneapolis–Saint Paul International Airport
  - New Orleans, Louisiana – Louis Armstrong New Orleans International Airport
  - New York City, New York
    - John F. Kennedy International Airport
    - LaGuardia Airport
  - Philadelphia, Pennsylvania – Philadelphia International Airport
  - Portland, Oregon – Portland International Airport
  - San Francisco, California – San Francisco International Airport
  - Seattle, Washington – Seattle–Tacoma International Airport
  - Tampa, Florida – Tampa International Airport
  - Washington, D.C. – Dulles International Airport
- United States Virgin Islands
  - Saint Croix – Henry E. Rohlsen Airport
  - Saint Thomas – Cyril E. King Airport

==== Oceania ====
- American Samoa
  - Pago Pago – Pago Pago International Airport
- Australia
  - Melbourne, Victoria – Melbourne Airport
  - Sydney, New South Wales – Sydney Airport
- Fiji
  - Nadi – Nadi International Airport
- Guam
  - Hagåtña – Antonio B. Won Pat International Airport
- Netherlands New Guinea
  - Biak – Frans Kaisiepo International Airport
- New Caledonia
  - Nouméa – Nouméa Magenta Airport
- New Zealand
  - Auckland – Auckland Airport
- Tahiti
  - Papeete – Faaʼa International Airport

==== South America ====
- Argentina
  - Buenos Aires – Ministro Pistarini International Airport
- Aruba
  - Oranjestad – Queen Beatrix International Airport
- Bolivia
  - La Paz – La Paz International Airport
- Brazil
  - Belém, Pará – Belém/Val-de-Cans International Airport
  - Brasília, Federal District – Brasília International Airport
  - Rio de Janeiro – Rio de Janeiro/Galeão International Airport
  - São Paulo
    - Viracopos International Airport
    - Sao Paulo–Congonhas Airport
- Chile
  - Santiago – Arturo Merino Benítez International Airport
- Colombia
  - Barranquilla – Ernesto Cortissoz International Airport
  - Cali – Alfonso Bonilla Aragon International Airport
- Ecuador
  - Guayaquil – José Joaquín de Olmedo International Airport
  - Quito – Old Mariscal Sucre International Airport
- Guyana
  - Georgetown – Cheddi Jagan International Airport
- Paraguay
  - Asunción – Silvio Pettirossi International Airport
- Peru
  - Lima – Jorge Chávez International Airport
- Suriname
  - Paramaribo – Johan Adolf Pengel International Airport
- Uruguay
  - Montevideo – Carrasco International Airport
- Venezuela
  - Caracas – Simón Bolívar International Airport (Venezuela)
  - Maracaibo – La Chinita International Airport

== Record-setting flights ==
At the outbreak of the war in the Pacific in December 1941, the Pacific Clipper was en route to New Zealand from San Francisco. Rather than risk flying back to Honolulu and being shot down by Japanese fighters, it was directed to fly west to New York. Starting on December 8, 1941, at Auckland, New Zealand, the Pacific Clipper covered over 31,500 miles (50,700 km), with stops including Surabaya, Karachi, Bahrain, Khartoum and Leopoldville. The Pacific Clipper landed at Pan American's LaGuardia Field seaplane base at 7:12 am on January 6, 1942, completing the first commercial plane flight to circumnavigate the world.

During the mid-1970s, Pan Am set two round-the-world records. Liberty Bell Express, a Boeing 747SP-21 named Clipper Liberty Bell, broke the commercial round-the-world record set by a Flying Tiger Line Boeing 707 with a new record of 46 hours, 50 seconds. The flight left New York-JFK on May 1, 1976, and returned on May 3. The flight stopped only in New Delhi and Tokyo, where a strike among the airport workers delayed it two hours. The flight beat the Flying Tiger Line's record by 16 hours 24 minutes.

In 1977, to commemorate its 50th birthday, Pan Am organized Flight 50, a round-the-world flight from San Francisco to San Francisco, this time over the North Pole and the South Pole with stops in London Heathrow, Cape Town and Auckland. 747SP-21 Clipper New Horizons was the former Liberty Bell, making the plane the only one to go around the globe over the Equator and the poles. The flight made it in 54 hours, 7 minutes, and 12 seconds, creating seven new world records certified by the FAI. Captain Walter H. Mullikin, who commanded this flight, also commanded the Liberty Bell Express flight.

== Corporate affairs ==
For much of its history the corporate headquarters were the Pan Am Building in Midtown Manhattan, New York City.

When Juan Trippe had the company offices relocated to New York City, he rented space in a building on 42nd Street. This facility was across from the Grand Central Terminal. From a period in the 1930s until 1963, the airline headquarters were in the Chrysler Building on 135 East 42nd Street, also in Midtown Manhattan.

In September 1960 Trippe and developer Erwin Wolfson signed a $115.5 million (equivalent to $961.73 million in 2025) lease agreement for the airline to occupy 613,000-square-foot (56,900 m^{2}) worth of space for the headquarters, totaling about 15 floors, and a new main ticket office at the intersection of 45th Street and Vanderbilt Avenue. At the time, the 30-year lease in the Chrysler Building was nearing the end of its life. The new lease was scheduled for 25 years.

== In popular culture ==
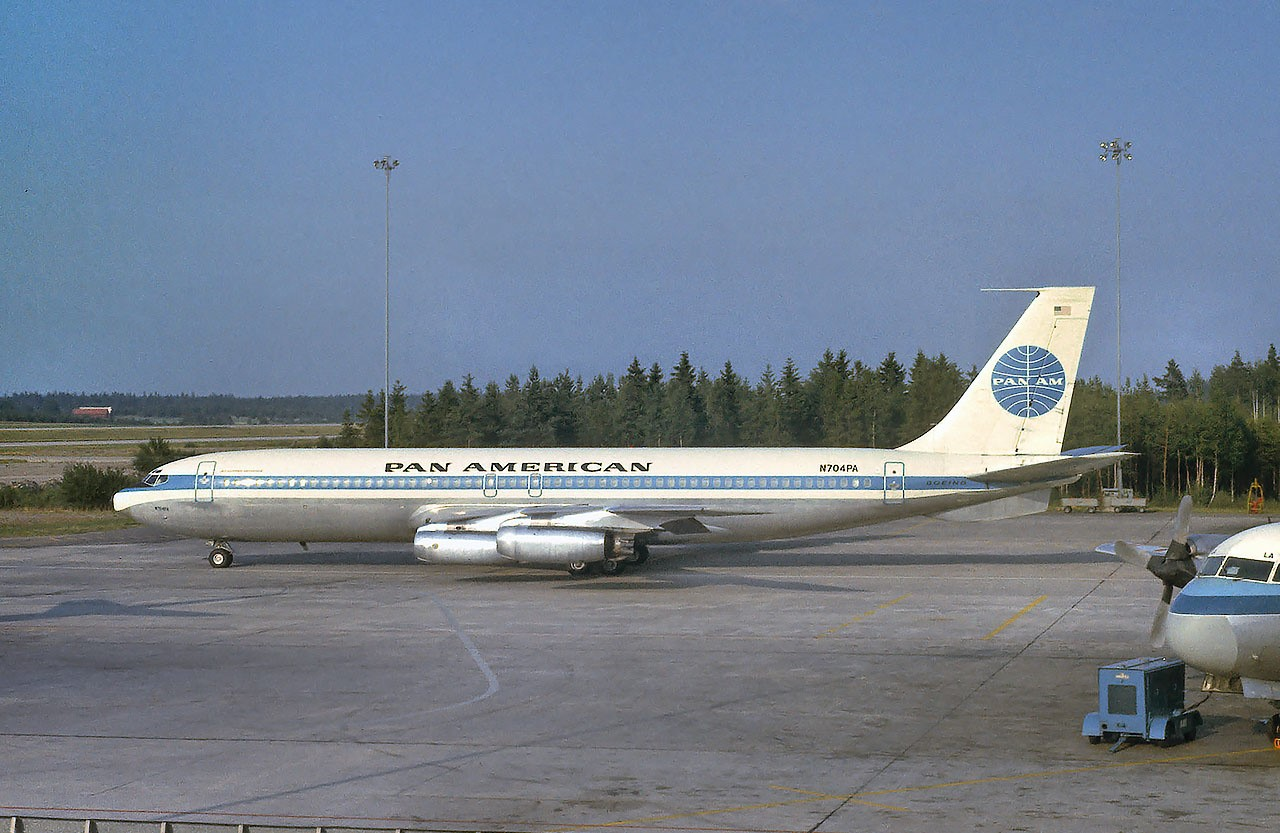
Clipper Defiance (N704PA) at Stockholm Arlanda Airport in July 1966. This aircraft carried the Beatles on their first U.S. visit in February 1964.

Pan Am held a lofty position in the popular culture of the Cold War era. One of the most famous images in which a Pan Am plane formed a backdrop was the Beatles' February 7, 1964, arrival at John F. Kennedy Airport aboard a Pan Am Boeing 707-331, Clipper Defiance.

From 1964 to 1968, con artist Frank Abagnale Jr. claimed to have masqueraded as a Pan Am pilot while still a minor, deadheading to many destinations in the cockpit jump seat. He also claims to have used Pan Am's preferred hotels, paid the bills with bogus checks, and later cashed fake payroll checks in Pan Am's name. Abagnale and his co-author Stan Redding documented this era in the memoir Catch Me if You Can, which was adapted into a film in 2002. Abagnale called Pan Am the "Ritz-Carlton of airlines" and noted that the days of luxury in airline travel were over. However, in 2021, journalist Alan C. Logan asserted that Frank Abagnale's claims were for the most part fabrications. Logan claims that Abagnale spent most of his late teenage years in prison and had only written a handful of false Pan Am checks that were rapidly detected as false and landed him back in prison.

In August 1964, Pan Am accepted the reservation of Gerhard Pistor, a journalist from Vienna, Austria, as the first passenger for future flights to the Moon. He paid a deposit of 500 Austrian schillings (roughly US$20 at the time). About 93,000 people followed on the Pan Am waiting list, called "First Moon Flights Club". Pan Am expected the flight to depart about 2000.

In the 1971 movie Willy Wonka & the Chocolate Factory, the Clipper Climax is briefly seen unloading Wonka chocolate.

A fictional Pan Am "Space Clipper", a commercial spaceplane called the Orion III, had a prominent role in Stanley Kubrick's 1968 film 2001: A Space Odyssey and was featured prominently in one of the movie's posters. Plastic models of the 2001 Pan Am Space Clipper were sold by both the Aurora Company and Airfix at the time of the film's release in 1968. A satire of the movie by Mad magazine in 1968 showed Pan Am female flight attendants in "Actionwear by Monsanto" outfits as they joked about the problems their passengers faced while vomiting in zero gravity. The film's sequel, 2010, also featured Pan Am in a background television commercial in the home of David Bowman's widow with the slogan, "At Pan Am, the sky is no longer the limit."

The airline appeared in other movies, notably in several James Bond films. The company's Boeing 707s were featured in Dr. No (1962) and From Russia with Love (1963), while a Pan Am 747 and the Worldport appeared in the 1973 film Live and Let Die.

A term used in popular psychology is "Pan American (or Pan Am) Smile". Named after the smile stewardesses gave to passengers in the airline's television commercials. It consists of a perfunctory mouth movement without the activity of facial muscles around the eyes that characterizes a genuine smile.

The 1982 film Blade Runner contains several prominent shots of advertisements for Pan Am. The 2017 sequel Blade Runner 2049 also shows a Pan Am sign in an establishing shot. Also in 2017, the film Ghost in the Shell paid homage to Pan Am, with an establishing shot of its own featuring the company's logo. Pan Am is also featured in the film One, Two, Three (1961).

In 2011, ABC announced a new television series based on the lives of a 1960s Pan Am flight crew. The series, titled Pan Am, began airing in September 2011. It was canceled in May 2012.

== Flight crews ==
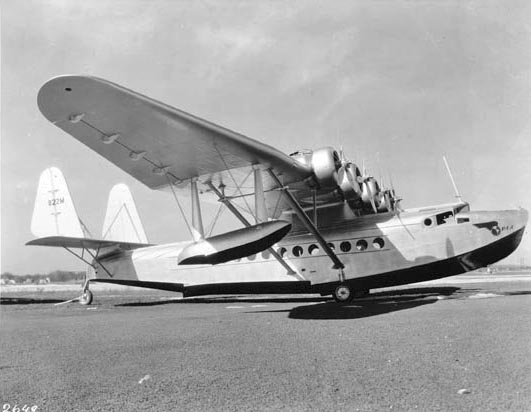
The Sikorsky S-42 was one of Pan Am's earlier flying boats and was used to survey the San Francisco – China route.

Critical to Pan Am's success as an airline was the proficiency of its flight crews, who were rigorously trained in long-distance flight, seaplane anchorage and berthing operations, over-water navigation, radio procedure, aircraft repair, and marine tides. During the day, use of the compass while judging drift from sea currents was normal procedure; at night, all flight crews were trained to use celestial navigation. In bad weather, pilots used dead reckoning and timed turns, making successful landings at fogged-in harbors by landing out to sea, then taxiing the plane into port. Many pilots had merchant marine certifications and radio licenses as well as pilot certificates.

A Pan Am flight captain would normally begin his career years earlier as a radio operator or even mechanic, steadily gaining his licenses and working his way up the flight crew roster to navigator, second officer, and first officer. Before World War II, it was not unusual for a captain to make engine repairs at remote locations.

Pan Am's mechanics and support staff were similarly trained. Newly hired applicants were frequently paired with experienced flight mechanics in several areas of the company until they had achieved proficiency in all aircraft types. Emphasis was placed on learning to maintain and overhaul aircraft in harsh seaborne environments when faced with logistical difficulties, as might be expected in a small foreign port without an aviation infrastructure or even an adequate road network. Many crews supported repair operations by flying in spare parts to planes stranded overseas, in some cases performing repairs themselves.

== Logo evolution ==
The first symbol of Pan Am was designed in 1929 and comprised the letters PAA in windswept italic letters next to a stylized globe and wing. The full name, Pan American Airways, was developed in a windswept italic logotype in the mid-1930s, around the time navy blue became the official color of the airline. In 1944, the logo was updated when the letters PAA were placed onto the wing and grid lines added to the globe. Also, at this time the name was expanded to Pan American World Airways to emphasize its worldwide destinations.

In 1956, Pan Am retained architect and designer Edward L. Barnes (graduate of the Harvard School of Architecture) to modernize its visual identity. Upon request of the airline, Barnes traveled across Pan Am's network to become better acquainted with its "personality," at the conclusion of which Barnes suggested a detailed study of the airline's visual identity, which Pan Am approved. Upon approval, Barnes hired fellow Harvard alum, Charles Forberg, to work with him on the project. Barnes and Forberg were responsible for creating the Pan Am logo that the airline is most famous for, a lighter shade of blue in a circular shape with a parabolic grid and an abbreviated logo in white at its center.

In 1969, the airline again revisited its visual identity and hired Ivan Chermayeff & Tom Geismer, which ran an influential New York design firm at the time. The team's first and most significant recommendation was to change the name to Pan Am from Pan American World Airways, along with a new logotype set in Helvetica. The new design was abandoned after only a few years and regressed to the design it had used in the late 1960s.

== Acquisitions and divestments ==
- 1927: Pan American Airways, Atlantic, Gulf, and Caribbean Airways, and Aviation Corporation of the Americas founded.
- 1928: All three precursor firms merge into Aviation Corporation of the Americas, with Pan American Airways as its brand.
- 1928: 50% interest in Peruvian Airways acquired by Pan American.
- 1929: Mexicana of Mexico was acquired by Pan Am.
- 1929: Pan American-Grace Airways (PANAGRA), operating on the west coast of South America, formed as a 50–50 joint venture with W. R. Grace and Company.
- 1930: New York, Rio, and Buenos Aires Line (NYRBA) was acquired, allowing Pan Am to operate along the East Coast of South America. NYRBA's Brazilian subsidiary is renamed Panair do Brasil.
- 1931: Majority control of SCADTA of Colombia acquired in secret.
- 1931: Pacific Alaska Airways formed.
- 1931: Boston-Maine Airways begins contract operations.
- 1932: Aerovias Centrales, S.A. was formed.
- 1932: Cubana of Cuba was acquired.
- 1932: Uraba, Medellin and Central Airways acquired.
- 1933: China National Aviation Corporation (CNAC) acquired.
- 1933: Servicios de Aviación de Guatemala acquired.
- 1933: Panama Airways was acquired.
- 1937: CNAC merged with China Airways.
- 1940: Minority holders of SCADTA bought out.
- 1940: Aerovías de Guatemala formed.
- 1940: 40% of Aeronaves de Mexico was acquired.
- 1941: SCADTA merged into SACO to form Avianca, owned by the Colombian government.
- 1943: Aerovías Venezolanas, S.A. (AVENSA) of Venezuela founded as a joint venture.
- 1943: 45% interest in Bahamas Airways acquired.
- 1944: Cuban investors acquire 56% of Cubana through a stock float.
- 1945: SAHSA was founded, being owned 40% by Pan Am, 40% by the Honduran government, and 20% by private carriers.
- 1946: InterContinental, a chain of hotels, founded.
- 1946: Brazilian investors bought 4% of Panair do Brasil, with Pan Am's share decreasing to 48%.
- 1949: Pan Am acquires a stake in Middle East Airlines (MEA), as well as a management contract.
- 1949: Pan Am's 20% stake in CNAC acquired by Chinese Nationalists, with assets split variously between the Nationalists and the People's Republic of China.
- 1950: American Overseas Airlines (AOA) acquired from American Airlines.
- 1954: Pan Am receives a contract to operate Patrick Air Force Base.
- 1954: Cuban government acquires Pan Am's remaining stake in Cubana.
- 1955: Pan Am's 49% stake in MEA is sold to British Overseas Airways Corporation (BOAC).
- 1959: Mexican government acquires Pan Am's stake in Mexicana and Aeronaves de México (later renamed Aeroméxico).
- 1961: Brazilian investors acquire all of Pan Am's shares in Panair do Brasil.
- 1967: PANAGRA sold to Braniff International Airways.
- 1970: Pan Am's 40% stake in SAHSA acquired by Transportes Aéreos Nacionales (TAN).
- 1976: AVENSA stake divested to the Venezuelan government.
- 1980: National Airlines was acquired.
- 1981: Pan Am Building sold to MetLife.
- 1981: InterContinental sold to Grand Metropolitan.
- 1986: Pacific Division sold to United Airlines.
- 1988: Pan Am's queue for 50 A320s sold to Braniff Inc.
- 1989: Pan Am World Services (PAWS) sold to Johnson Controls.
- 1990: London Heathrow-based routes sold to United Airlines.
- 1990: Internal German Services Division was sold to Lufthansa.
- 1991: Atlantic Division, Pan Am Shuttle, and New York City Worldport sold to Delta Air Lines.
- 1991: Caribbean/Latin American routes sold to American Airlines and United Airlines at auction.

== Accidents and incidents ==
Pan Am experienced a total of 95 incidents. The first accident occurred in 1928 when a Fokker C-2 crashed, killing 1 person. Two Pan Am Boeing 747s were involved in the airline's most significant crashes: one was involved in the 1977 Tenerife airport disaster. KLM Flight 4805, a 747 that was beginning its takeoff run, collided with Pan Am Flight 1736, also a 747, while it was still on the runway in dense fog conditions. It is the deadliest accident in aviation history, with a total of 583 fatalities on both planes. In 1988, Pan Am Flight 103 was bombed over Lockerbie, Scotland. When including the 11 fatalities on the ground, it resulted in 270 fatalities and became the worst terrorist attack in the history of the United Kingdom. The fallout from Flight 103 led to Pan Am's eventual bankruptcy in 1991.

== Fleet ==
=== Fleet in 1990 ===
The following were aircraft operated by Pan Am and Pan Am Express in March 1990, a year and a half before the airline's collapse:

Pan Am fleet
Aircraft	Number	Orders	Passengers				Notes
Aircraft	Number	Orders	F	C	Y	Total	Notes
Airbus A300B4	13	—	—	24	230	254	
Airbus A310-200	7	—	12	30	154	196	
Airbus A310-300	14	—	12	30	154	196	
Boeing 727-200	91	9	—	14	131	145	Orders for used aircraft
Boeing 737-200	5	—	—	21	95	116	
Boeing 747-100	18	—	21	44	347	412	747 Launch Customer; 1987 seating configuration
Boeing 747-200B	7	—	39	52	286	377	1989 seating configuration (for South American flights)
Total	155	9					
Pan Am Express Fleet
ATR 42-300	8	3	—	—	46	46	
de Havilland Canada Dash 7	10	—	—	—	50	50	
BAe Jetstream 31	10	—	—	—	19	19	One airframe G-BSMY operated by BAe in Pan Am Express livery in 1990
BAe 146-100	9	—	—	—	Unknown	Unknown	
Total	18	3					

=== Fleet history ===
All the aircraft ever operated by Pan Am:

Pan Am fleet
Aircraft	Total	Introduced	Retired	Notes
Flying boat
Boeing 314	7	1939	1946	Carried first Transatlantic Air Mail
Consolidated Commodore	14	1930	1943	
Douglas Dolphin	2	1934	Unknown	Allocated to China National Aviation Corporation
Martin M-130	3	1935	1945	Carried first Transpacific Air Mail
Sikorsky S-36	5	1927	1928	
Sikorsky S-38	24	1928	1943	
Sikorsky S-40	3	1931	1944	First aircraft to carry the Clipper name
Sikorsky S-42	10	1934	1946	
Sikorsky S-43 Baby Clipper	10	1936	1945	
Jet aircraft
Airbus A300B4	13	1984	1991	2 more ordered; 4 disposed to Sempati Air
Airbus A310-200	7	1985	1991	Disposed to Delta Air Lines as part of the sale of the Atlantic Division.
Airbus A310-300	14	1987	1991	Disposed to Delta Air Lines as part of the sale of the Atlantic Division.
Boeing 707-120	8	1958	1974	Worldwide launch customer of the 707 series
Boeing 707-320B	85	1959	1981	
Boeing 707-320C	34	1963	1979	
Boeing 720B	9	1963	1974	
Boeing 727-100	27	1965	1991	
Boeing 727-100	19	1965	1991	Acquired from merged National Airlines
Boeing 727-200	81	1980	1991	
Boeing 727-200	24	1980	1991	Acquired from merged National Airlines
Boeing 737-200	16	1982	1991	
Boeing 747-100	33	1970	1991	Launch Customer of the Boeing 747.
Boeing 747-100	4	1984	1991	Acquired from American Airlines
Boeing 747-100	1	1978	1991	Previously owned by Delta Air Lines and China Airlines
Boeing 747-100	1	1984	1991	Previously owned by Delta Air Lines and China Airlines
Boeing 747-100	5	1986	1991	Acquired from United Airlines
Boeing 747-200B	7	1983	1991	Previously owned by Singapore Airlines.
Boeing 747-200C	1	1974	1983	Acquired from World Airways. Operated by Pan Am Cargo
Boeing 747-200F	2	1979	1983	Operated by Pan Am Cargo
Boeing 747SP	10	1976	1986	Launch Customer of the Boeing 747SP; Disposed to United Airlines as part of the sale of the Pacific Division.
Boeing 747SP	1	1983	1986	Acquired from Braniff Airways
Douglas DC-8-32	19	1960	1970	
Douglas DC-8-33	19	1960	1970	
Douglas DC-8-62	1	1970	1971	
Lockheed L-1011-500 TriStar	3	1980	1985	Disposed to the Royal Air Force as tanker/transports.
Lockheed L-1011-500 TriStar	3	1980	1985	Disposed to Delta Air Lines
Lockheed L-1011-500 TriStar	6	1980	1986	Disposed to United Airlines as part of the sale of the Pacific Division.
McDonnell Douglas DC-10-10	11	1980	1984	Acquired from National Airlines. Disposed to American Airlines.
McDonnell Douglas DC-10-30	4	1980	1984	Acquired from National Airlines. Disposed to American Airlines.
McDonnell Douglas DC-10-30	1	1980	1985	Ordered by National Airlines before their merger with Pan Am. Disposed to United Airlines as part of the sale of the Pacific Division.
Propeller aircraft
Boeing 307 Stratoliner	3	1940	1948	
Boeing 377 Stratocruiser	28	1949	1961	
Boeing 377 Stratocruiser	8	1949	1961	Acquired from American Overseas Airlines
Convair CV-240	20	1948	1957	
Convair CV-340	6	1953	1955	
Curtiss-Wright C-46 Commando	12	1948	1956	
Douglas DC-2	9	1934	1941	
Douglas DC-3	90	1937	1966	
Douglas DC-4	22	1947	1961	
Douglas DC-6	49	1953	1968	
Douglas DC-7	37	1955	1966	
Fairchild FC-2	5	1928	1933	First aircraft of Pan Am's subsidiary Panagra
Fairchild 71	3	1930	1940	
Fairchild 91	2	1936	1937	4 more were ordered, but all canceled
Fokker F-10A	12	1929	1935	
Fokker F.VIIa/3m	3	1927	1930	First Pan Am-owned airplane to carry air mail
Ford Trimotor	11	1929	1940	
Lockheed Model 9 Orion	2	1935	1936	
Lockheed Model 10 Electra	4	1934	1938	
Lockheed L-049 Constellation	29	1946	1957	
Lockheed L-749 Constellation	4	1947	1950	
Lockheed L-1049 Super Constellation	1	1955	Unknown	
Turboprop aircraft
ATR 42	12	1987	1991	Operated by Pan Am Express
BAe Jetstream 31	10	1987	1991	Operated by Pan Am Express
de Havilland Canada Dash 7	8	Unknown	1991	Operated by Pan Am Express

== Leadership ==
Presidents and chairman of Pan Am were:

=== President ===
1. Juan Terry Trippe, 1927– July 7, 1964
2. Harold Edwin Gray, July 7, 1964 – May 7, 1968
3. Najeeb Elias Halaby Jr., May 7, 1968 – November 16, 1971
4. William Thomas Seawell, November 16, 1971 – December 31, 1976
5. Forwood Cloud Wiser Jr., January 1, 1976 – May 9, 1978
6. Dante Alfred Colussy Jr., May 9, 1978 – December 1, 1980
7. William Hugh Waltrip, July 7, 1981 – June 30, 1982
8. Thomas George Plaskett, January 1988 – October 1, 1991
9. Russell L. Ray Jr., October 1, 1991 – December 4, 1991

=== Chairman of the Board ===
1. Cornelius Vanderbilt Whitney, 1931– February 11, 1942
2. Juan Terry Trippe, July 7, 1964 – May 7 1968
3. Harold Edwin Gray, May 7, 1968 – May 5, 1970
4. Najeeb Elias Halaby Jr., 1970 – March 22, 1972
5. William Thomas Seawell, March 22, 1972 – September 1, 1981
6. Charles Edward Acker, September 1, 1981 – January 21, 1988
7. Thomas George Plaskett, January 21, 1988 – December 4, 1991

== See also ==
- Pan Am Air Bridge
- Pan American Airways Guided Missile Range Division

== Sources ==
- Baum, Brian (1997). Boeing 747SP. World Transport Press "Great Airliners" no. 3.
- Bilstein, Roger E. (July 1, 2001). Flight in America. Johns Hopkins University Press. ISBN 978-0-8018-6685-2.
- Burns, George E. (2000). The Jet Age Arrives. Pan American Historical Foundation.
- Clausen, Meredith. The Pan Am Building and the Shattering of the Modernist Dream. MIT Press, 2005. ISBN 0262033240, 9780262033244.
- Homan, Thomas; Reilly (2000). Pan Am. Arcadia Publishing. ISBN 978-0-7385-0552-7.
- Lawrence, Harry (2004). Aviation and the Role of Government. Kendall Hunt. ISBN 978-0-7575-0944-5.
- Pirie, Gordon (2021). "Winging it across the Atlantic: Pan Am and Africa, 1940-1990". Journal of Transatlantic Studies. 19: 72–98. doi:10.1057/s42738-020-00064-9. S2CID 231777921.
- Ray, Sally J. (1999). "Pan American World Airways Flight 103". Strategic Communication in Crisis Management. Quorum/Greenwood. pp. 183–204. ISBN 978-1-56720-153-6.
- Smith, M.J. jr. (1987). Passenger airliners of the United States 1926-1986-A pictorial history. Missoula (Montana): Pictorial Histories Publishing Co.
- Taylor, H. A. "Tony" (April–July 1982). "Stratocruiser... Ending an Airline Era". Air Enthusiast. No. 18. pp. 37–53. ISSN 0143-5450.
- Taylor, H. A. & Alting, Peter (April–July 1980). "Fokker's 'Lucky Seven'". Air Enthusiast (12): 24–38. ISSN 0143-5450.
- World Aviation Annual. Washington (D.C.): Aviation Research Institute. 1948.
- World Airline Record. 1948, 1949, 1950, 1952, 1955, 1965, 1972. Chicago (IL): Roadcap & Ass.
- "Pan American World Airways, Inc., Records". Otto G. Richter Library, University of Miami Archives. June 26, 1996. Archived from the original on July 28, 2005.
- "Pan American World Airways, Queen of The Skies (2004)". PanAmAir.org. Archived from the original on August 5, 2005.
- Death of an American dream : The Pan Am story. Dallas (TX): Collins Brothers. 1992.
- Death of an American dream : The Pan Am story. Stepping Stone Productions. 1992.
- "Pan American World Airways: Part 2". Aviation News. 73, 11. Stamford, UK: Key Publishing: 48–53. November 2011. ISSN 1477-6855. (Aviation News online)
