= Near miss =

Incident that could have caused harm

A near miss, near death, near hit, or close call is an unplanned event that has the potential to cause, but does not actually result in human injury, environmental or equipment damage, or an interruption to normal operation.

The US Occupational Safety and Health Act defines a near miss as an incident in which no property was damaged and no personal injury was sustained, but where, given a slight shift in time or position, damage or injury easily could have occurred. Near misses also may be referred to as near accidents, accident precursors, injury-free events and, in the case of moving objects, near collisions. A near miss is often an error, with harm prevented by other considerations and circumstances.

== Causes ==
There are factors for a near miss related to the operator, and factors related to the context. Fatigue is an example for the former. The risk of a car crash after a more than 24-hour shift for physicians has been observed to increase by 168%, and the risk of near miss by 460%. Factors relating to the context include time pressures, unfamiliar settings, and in the case of health care, diverse patients, and high patient-to-nurse staffing ratios.

== Notable examples ==
=== Nuclear close calls ===
During the Cold War, several incidents nearly triggered nuclear war. These were often caused by benign events (faulty equipment, natural phenomena, or routine military activities) misinterpreted as signs of an enemy attack, due to the tense geopolitical climate and limitations in early warning systems.

In 1962, during the Cuban Missile Crisis, a Soviet nuclear submarine was surrounded by US Navy destroyers using depth charges to force it to surface. Without the ability to contact Moscow, the captain and another officer advocated for launching a nuclear torpedo, but Vasily Arkhipov vetoed the decision. Similarly, in 1983, after an early-warning system raised an alarm, Stanislav Petrov judged it to be a false alarm, and violated the protocol by not reporting it as an attack. The alarm for this incident was later found to be caused by unusual atmospheric conditions rather than missile launches. High alert states have also been caused by a scientific rocket launch, by a mishandled training tape, and by a bear in the dark interpreted as an intruder.

Such events can both be caused by technical or human errors. Decision-makers often only had minutes to determine whether to retaliate, due to the fact that nuclear explosions could destroy land-based nuclear missile launchers, although nuclear submarines provide nuclear second-strike capabilities. One proposition to reduce risks is to wait for an actual explosion rather than relying on alarm systems. Another one involves requiring consensus among multiple decision-makers, or even a vote from Congress. China also has a "no first use policy", and stores warheads and missiles in different locations.

Another nuclear safety accident, the 1961 Goldsboro B-52 crash, occurred when a bomber flying over North Carolina lost a wing after a fuel leak. The two nuclear bombs it was carrying fell. For one bomb, 3 of the 4 safety mechanisms were armed, and the explosion was only averted by a switch.

== Reporting, analysis and prevention ==
Most safety activities are reactive and not proactive. Many organizations wait for losses to occur before taking steps to prevent a recurrence. Near miss incidents often precede loss producing events but are largely ignored because nothing (no injury, damage or loss) happened. Employees are not enlightened to report these close calls as there has been no disruption or loss in the form of injuries or property damage. Thus, many opportunities to prevent the accidents that the organization has not yet had are lost. Recognizing and reporting near miss incidents can make a major difference to the safety of workers within organizations. In the heavy construction industry, near miss reporting software allows crews to find and document opportunities that help reduce safety risks as the software tracks, analyzes and calls attention to near misses on the job site to help prevent future incidents. History has shown repeatedly that most loss producing events (accidents) were preceded by warnings or near accidents, sometimes also called close calls, narrow escapes or near hits.

In terms of human lives and property damage, near misses are cheaper, zero-cost learning opportunities (compared to learning from actual death, injury or property loss events).

Getting a very high number of near misses reported is the goal as long as that number is within the organization's ability to respond and investigate - otherwise it is merely a paperwork exercise and a waste of time; it is possible to achieve a ratio of 100 near misses reported per loss event.

Achieving and investigating a high ratio of near miss reports will find the causal factors and root causes of potential future accidents, resulting in about 95% reduction in actual losses.

An ideal near miss event reporting system includes both mandatory (for incidents with high loss potential) and voluntary, non-punitive reporting by witnesses. A key to any near miss report is the "lesson learned". Near miss reporters can describe what they observed of the beginning of the event, and the factors that prevented loss from occurring.

The events that caused the near miss are subjected to root cause analysis to identify the defect in the system that resulted in the error and factors that may either amplify or ameliorate the result.

To prevent the near miss from happening again, the organization must institute teamwork training, feedback on performance and a commitment to continued data collection and analysis, a process called continuous improvement.

Near misses are smaller in scale, relatively simpler to analyze and easier to resolve. Thus, capturing near misses not only provides an inexpensive means of learning, but also has some equally beneficial spin offs:

- Captures sufficient data for statistical analysis; trending studies.
- Provides immense opportunity for "employee participation," a basic requirement for a successful workplace health and safety program. This embodies principles of behavior shift, responsibility sharing, awareness, and incentives.
- One of the primary workplace problems near miss incident reporting attempts to solve directly or indirectly is to try to create an open culture whereby everyone shares and contributes in a responsible manner. Near miss reporting has been shown to increase employee relationships and encourage teamwork in creating a safer work environment.

In a near miss, all the involved parties are alive to provide detailed information. In fatal incidents much of the critical information may be lost. In some cases the survivors may provide useful information on how a fatality was avoided.

=== Barriers to reporting ===
- Fear of blame and other repercussions: A just culture is a prerequisite for free reporting. An environment in which the organisation is quick to apportion blame without first analysing what went wrong, and why it went wrong will discourage full and accurate reporting.
- Failure to report feedback: People are discouraged from reporting near misses if there is never any feedback provided.

== Reporting systems by industry ==
Reporting of near misses by observers is an established error reduction technique in many industries and organizations:

=== Aviation ===
In the United States, the Aviation Safety Reporting System (ASRS) has been collecting confidential voluntary reports of close calls from pilots, flight attendants, air traffic controllers since 1976. The system was established after TWA Flight 514 crashed on approach to Dulles International Airport near Washington, DC, killing all 85 passengers and 7 crew in 1974. The investigation that followed found that the pilot misunderstood an ambiguous response from the Dulles air traffic controllers, and that earlier another airline had told its pilots, but not other airlines, about a similar near miss. The ASRS identifies deficiencies and provides data for planning improvements to stakeholders without regulatory action. Some familiar safety rules, such as turning off electronic devices that can interfere with navigation equipment, are a result of this program. Due to near miss observations and other technological improvements, the rate of fatal accidents has dropped about 65%, to one fatal accident in about 4.5 million departures, from one in nearly 2 million in 1997. Furthermore, according to a report in The New York Times on Wednesday, November 15, 2023 in response to a series of near collisions, the Federal Aviation Administration sought the input of external experts. The experts recommended addressing the shortage of air traffic controllers and upgrading outdated technology.

In the United Kingdom, an aviation near miss report is known as an "airmiss" or an "airprox", an air proximity hazard, by the Civil Aviation Authority. Since reporting began, aircraft near misses continue to decline.

=== Fire-rescue services ===
The rate of firefighter fatalities and injuries in the United States is unchanged for the last 15 years despite improvements in personal protective equipment, apparatus and a decrease in structure fires. In 2005, the National Fire Fighter Near-Miss Reporting System was established, funded by grants from the US Fire Administration and Fireman’s Fund Insurance Company, and endorsed by the International Associations of Fire Chiefs and Fire Fighters. Any member of the fire service community is encouraged to submit a report when they are involved in, witnesses, or is told of a near-miss event. The report may be anonymous, and is not forwarded to any regulatory agency.

=== Law enforcement and public safety ===
A total of 1,439 US law enforcement officers died in the line of duty between 2006 and 2016, an average of one death every 61 hours or 144 per year, including 123 in 2015. In 2014, the Law Enforcement Officer (LEO) Near Miss Reporting System was established, with funding support from the US Department of Justice's Office of Community Oriented Policing Services (COPS Office). Since its launch, the LEO Near Miss system has established endorsements and partnerships with the National Law Enforcement Officers' Memorial Fund (NLEOMF), the International Association of Chiefs of Police (IACP), the International Association of Directors of Law Enforcement Standards and Training (IADLEST), the Officer Down Memorial Page (ODMP) and the Below 100 organization. The Police Foundation, a national, independent non-profit organization, operates the system and has received additional support from the Motorola Solutions Foundation. Law enforcement members are to submit voluntary reports when involved in or having witnessed or become aware of a near-miss event. Near miss reports take minutes to submit, can be submitted anonymously and are not forwarded to regulatory or investigative agencies, but are used to provide analysis, policy and training recommendations to the law enforcement community.

=== Healthcare ===
AORN, a US-based professional organization of perioperative registered nurses, has put in effect a voluntary near miss reporting system called SafetyNet covering medication or transfusion reactions, communication or consent issues, wrong patient or procedures, communication breakdown or technology malfunctions. An analysis of incidents allows safety alerts to be issued to AORN members.

The United States Department of Veterans Affairs (VA) and the National Aeronautics and Space Administration (NASA) developed the Patient Safety Reporting System modeled upon the Aviation Safety Reporting System to monitor patient safety through voluntary, confidential reports.

=== Rail ===
CIRAS (Confidential Incident Reporting and Analysis System) is a confidential reporting system modelled upon ASRS and originally developed by the University of Strathclyde for use in the Scottish rail industry. However, after the Ladbroke Grove rail crash, John Prescott mandated its use throughout the whole UK rail industry. Since 2006 CIRAS has been run by an autonomous Charitable trust.

=== Underwater diving ===
There is a significant difference between professional and recreational diving. Professional diving has long established systems for risk assessment, incident mitigation, codes of practice and industry regulation, which have made it an acceptably safe occupation, but at considerable cost. The professional diving industry delivers materials such as IMCA safety flashes, which are anonymised reports of accidents and near misses from the offshore diving industry published by International Marine Contractors Association which inform the industry and encourage independent evaluation of the incidents.

Recreational divers are personally responsible for their own actions and are largely unregulated. Risk awareness and personal and peer group attitudes are determining factors in triggering dive accidents. Recreational scuba diving operations are exposed to risks which can develop into incidents, injury or death of participants, with associated risk of liability for the operator and participants. Certifying and safety agencies gather risk data reported in the recreational scuba diving industry, but there is no published research specifically regarding recreational divers and dive centres attitudes and perceptions of safety. Avoidable accidents continue to occur in recreational diving in spite of long established education by the training agencies, which is mainly focused on essential skills specified by training standards. More awareness of risk, and a changed attitude toward safety would help to reduce the number of such incidents.

There is a combination of a factors hindering the reporting of near misses in the recreational diving industry. There is a lack of structured reporting mechanisms, a lack of clarity of what would constitute a near miss, or reportable incident, as most recreational divers have very little personal background and no training in workplace health and safety, and not much more from the service providers. The competitive nature of the industry and in some countries litigious nature of the population, tends to discourage sharing of information which legal advisors may consider risky, and resource constraints contributes to the underreporting of near misses in recreational diving. Safety requirements are generally imposed by certification agencies and to a lesser extent by commercial level occupational health and safety authorities. The service provider is mostly uninvolved beyond basic compliance with rules. Changing these attitudes would require either a cultural shift towards prioritizing safety and collaboration the major stakeholders in the diving community, or a clear threat to profits. There are a few non-profit organisations involved in recreational diver safety, such as Divers Alert Network, British Sub-Aqua Club, the Rebreather Education and Safety Association, National Speleological Society, Cave Diving Group, and some of the member oriented technical diving organisations, which do the majority of research into recreational dive safety, and analyse what information on near misses is available. Part of the problem in getting divers to report near misses is the stigma attached to what are perceived by some as violations of safety rules, without due analysis of why the rules were violated, or even whether they were strictly applicable, as there is a tendency among training agencies to prescribe behaviour as appropriate, correct, and necessary without going into the reasons for the rules, and as a consequence most divers are not in a position to make a fair and informed judgement, or even to know that there may be an alternative or specific scope to the received rules.

Researchers recognise that more information on near misses would facilitate analysis of diving safety.

A book was published in 2021 providing personal recollections of near misses by a number of well known and influential technical divers to counteract this attitude and show that even the most respected divers are occasionally inattentive, unlucky, or mistake-prone, and have survived by luck, skill or a combination of both.

== See also ==
- 1983 Soviet nuclear false alarm incident – Incident which nearly precipitated nuclear warfare, example of a nuclear close call
- Aviation safety – State in which risks associated with aviation are at an acceptable level
- Confidential incident reporting – System to allow safety problems to be reported in confidence
- Error – Incorrect or inaccurate action
- Hazard analysis – Method for assessing risk
- Maternal near miss – Event in which a pregnant woman comes close to death but does not die
- Patient safety – Prevention, reduction, reporting, and analysis of medical error
- Road traffic safety – Methods and measures for reducing the risk of death and injury on roads
- Root cause analysis – Method of identifying the fundamental causes of faults or problems
- Safety engineering – Engineering discipline
- Separation (aeronautics) – Concept for keeping aircraft safe distances apart
