= Bobbie R. Allen =

American aviator and government official

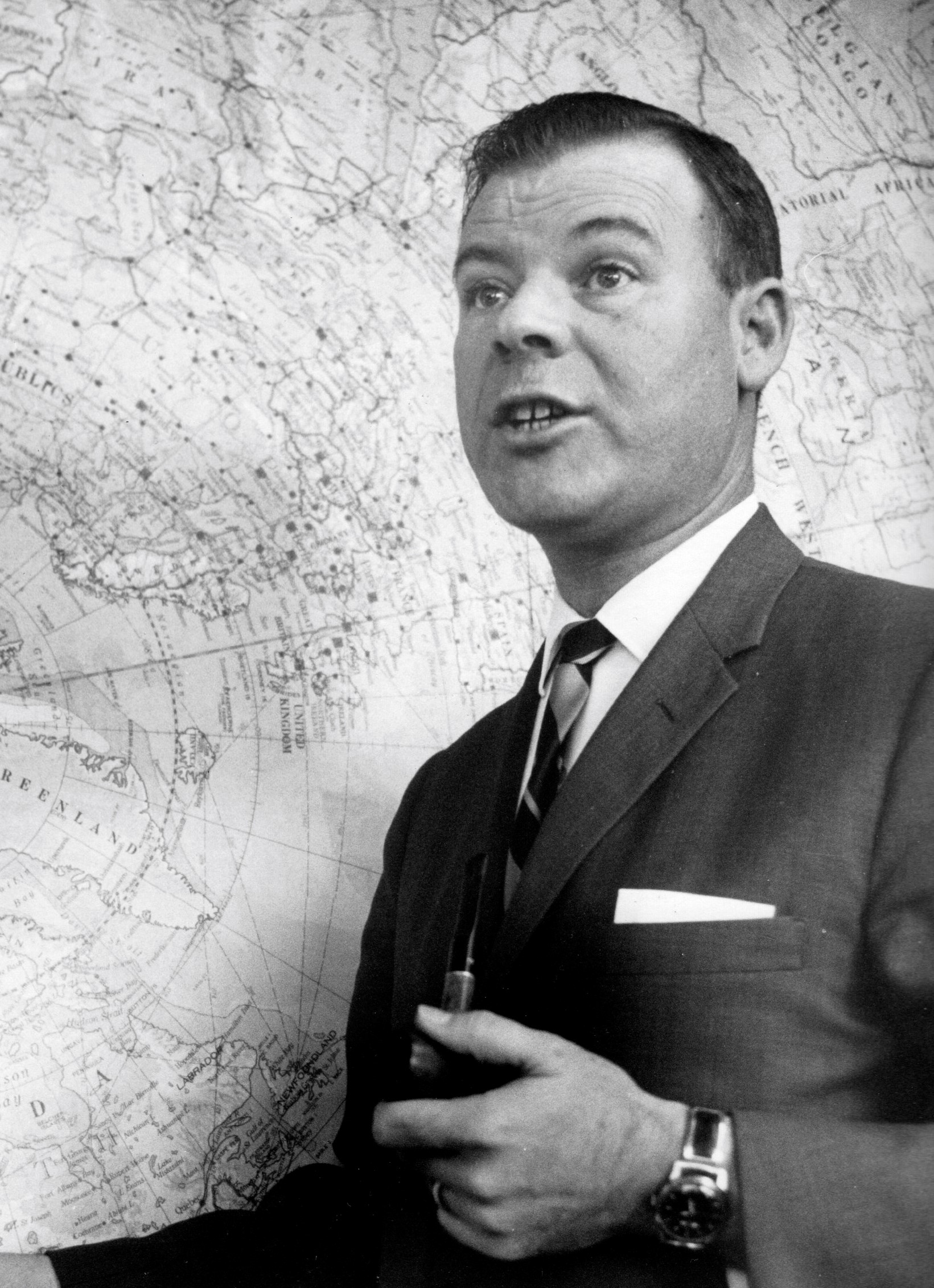
- Allen in 1966

Director, Bureau of Safety Civil Aeronautics Board
- In office October 1, 1964 – April 1, 1967
- Preceded by: Leon H. Tanguay
- Succeeded by: Bobbie R. Allen (NTSB)

Director, Bureau of Aviation Safety National Transportation Safety Board
- In office April 1, 1967 – June 15, 1968
- Preceded by: Bobbie R. Allen (CAB)
- Succeeded by: Robert Froman

Personal details
- Born: Bobbie Ray Allen; July 26, 1922 Winnsboro, Texas, U.S.
- Died: November 17, 1972 (aged 50) Fort Worth, Texas, U.S.
- Spouse: Arlene Evelyn Allen
- Children: 5
- Education: Kilgore Jr. College St. Mary's College; Naval War College; University of Southern California
- Occupation: Government Official, Air Safety Investigator and Naval Aviator

Military service
- Branch/service: U.S. Naval Aviator
- Years of service: 1943–1968
- Rank: Captain
- Battles/wars: World War II, Korean War, Berlin Crisis

Bobbie R. Allen (July 26, 1922 – November 17, 1972) was a U.S. Government Official, air safety investigator and Naval Aviator. As director of the Bureau of Aviation Safety at the Civil Aeronautics Board – later the National Transportation Safety Board – Allen spearheaded the use of flight data recorders and laid the groundwork for what would become the Aviation Safety Reporting System. At the time of Allen's retirement from the NTSB in 1968, the airlines of the world had the best safety record in their history and United States scheduled carriers had their best safety record since 1954.

Charles S. Murphy, adviser to three U.S. presidents and chairman of the Civil Aeronautics Board, nominated Allen for the Rockefeller Public Service Award and wrote the following:

"His outstanding work has contributed significantly to the constantly improving safety record throughout the world."..."Devoted to duty, able to inspire, …Mr. Allen is a credit to the Bureau, the Board, the Federal Service, and the Nation."

== Early life ==
Bobbie Ray Allen was born on July 26, 1922, in Winnsboro, Texas. His father, Buddy Bura Allen (August 15, 1900 – November 7, 1978) was a deaf-mute and was one of twelve children born to Joe and Dollie Allen, who farmed cotton near the town of Winnsboro, Texas. Allen's mother, Edna Lorena Brown (March 6, 1903 - June 27, 1943), was one of five children, born to Walter Shook Brown and Hattie Belle Henderson, both of East Texas communities near Winnsboro. Allen's father was an oil field laborer and shoe cobbler, and his mother was a waitress at a small restaurant near their home in Marshall, Texas. When his 18-month-old baby brother died unexpectedly, his parents divorced and his father moved to Kansas. He and his mother remained in Marshall and to help with costs, he worked part time delivering Western Union telegrams, and then as a soda fountain server at a local drug store. In June 1942, Allen was working part time at the Logan and Whaley Hardware Store when he graduated from Marshall High School. In October of that year, he entered the Navy's V-5 pre-flight training program, beginning phase one at Kilgore Junior College in Kilgore Texas and then phase two at St. Mary's College in Moraga, California.

== Career ==
Career summary
	Organization	Role
1959	Civil Aeronautics Board	Air safety investigator
1962	Civil Aeronautics Board	Supervisory air safety investigator
1963	Civil Aeronautics Board	Deputy director, Bureau of Safety
1963	National Aircraft Accident Investigation School	Chairman of the board
1963	Guggenheim Foundation	Member, Technical Committee
1964	Society of Air Safety Investigators	Board of directors and charter member
1964	Civil Aeronautics Board	Director, Bureau of Safety
1965	International Civil Aviation Org	Head U.S. Delegation, Accident Investigation Division, Montreal Canada
1967	National Transportation Safety Board	Director, Bureau of Aviation Safety
1968	National Transportation Safety Board	Special assistant to the director
1942–46	VF-52(N)	Night fighter pilot, WWII
1952–53	VC-4 DET44(N)	Night fighter pilot - XO, Korean War
1954–59	USNR	ASO, NAS Akron, NAS Ellington, NAS Glenview
1961–62	VS-721	Commanding officer, Berlin Crisis
1964	USNR	ASO, NAS Andrews, 15th Annual Global Strategy Discussions, U.S. Naval War College
1968	USNR	Retired, captain

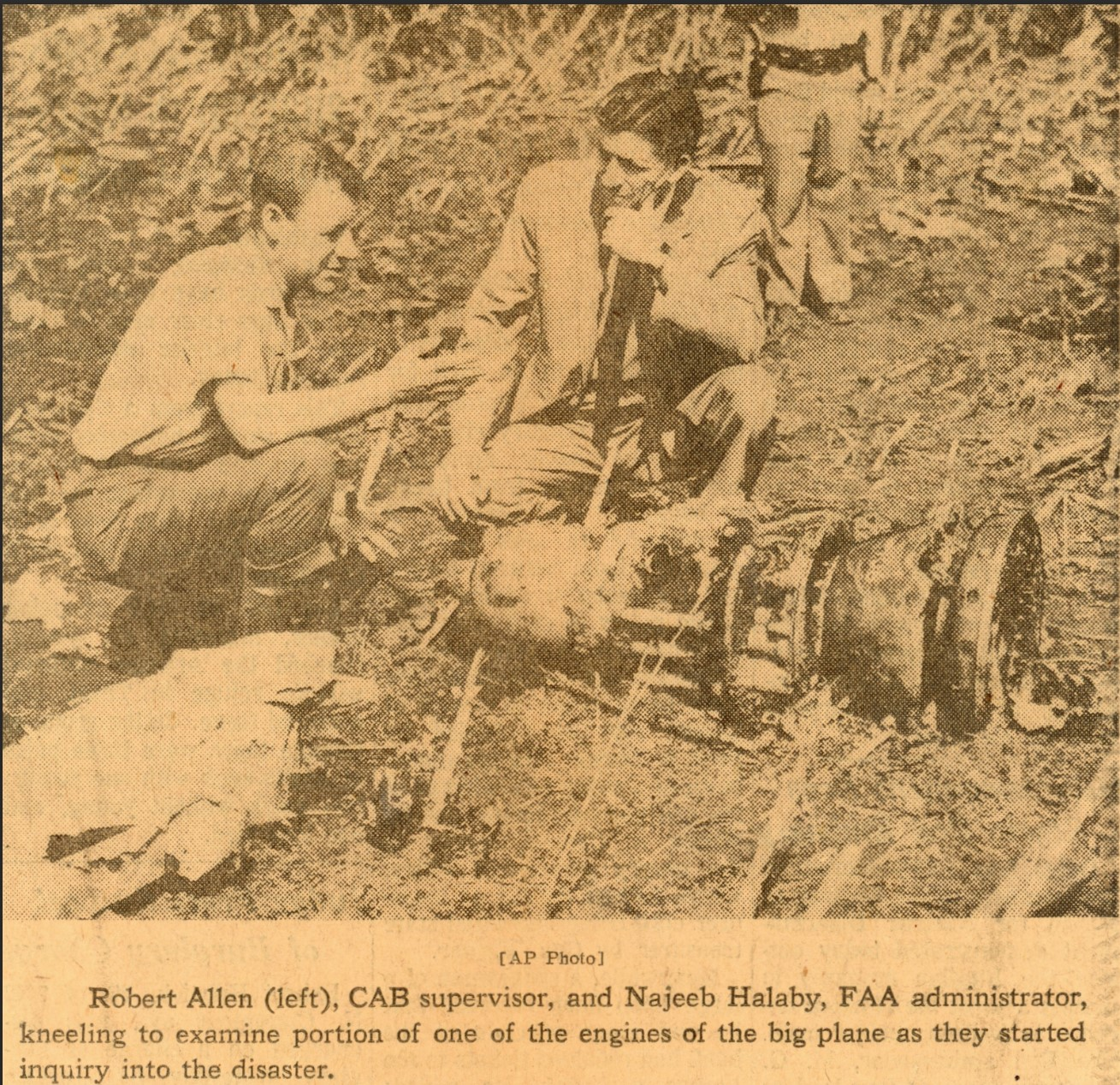
CAB supervisor Bobbie R. Allen and FAA administrator Najeeb Halaby discuss accident details c. 1963

Allen joined the Civil Aeronautics Board in May 1959 as an air safety investigator. He was subsequently promoted to Chief of the Chicago office and later named deputy director in Washington, D.C. He was then named director of the Bureau of Safety on October 1, 1964, and remained director when the National Transportation Safety Board was formed in 1967. He continued until health-related retirement on June 15, 1968, when he stepped down to become Special Assistant to the director focusing on accident prevention until July 31, 1970, when he would fully retire.

As chairman of the U.S. delegation at the ICAO third accident investigation division meeting at Montreal in January 1965, Allen was responsible for developing the U.S. proposals which formed the basis of accident investigations throughout the world. The U.S. formally adopted the proposals at the White House on Dec 1, 1965.

Allen traveled extensively throughout South America, Asia, and Europe emphasizing the importance of accident investigation and stressing the need for professionally trained investigators. His organization provided investigative assistance and on-the-scene expertise to numerous countries around the world. In 1966, he traveled to the Soviet Union, for bilateral discussions between the U.S. and the U.S.S.R. to initiate air service between the two countries.

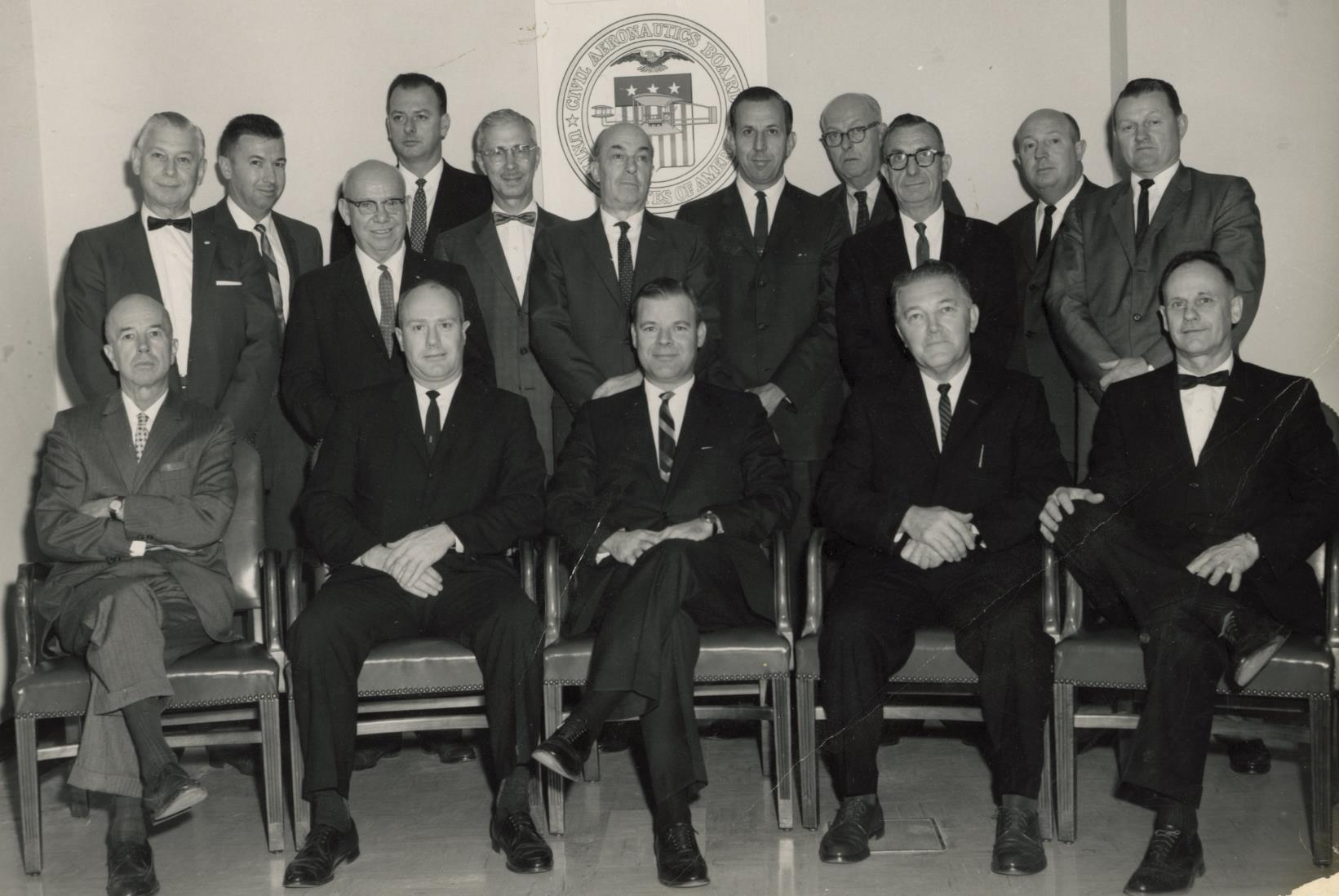
Members of CAB Bureau of Safety with director Bobbie R. Allen, c. 1965

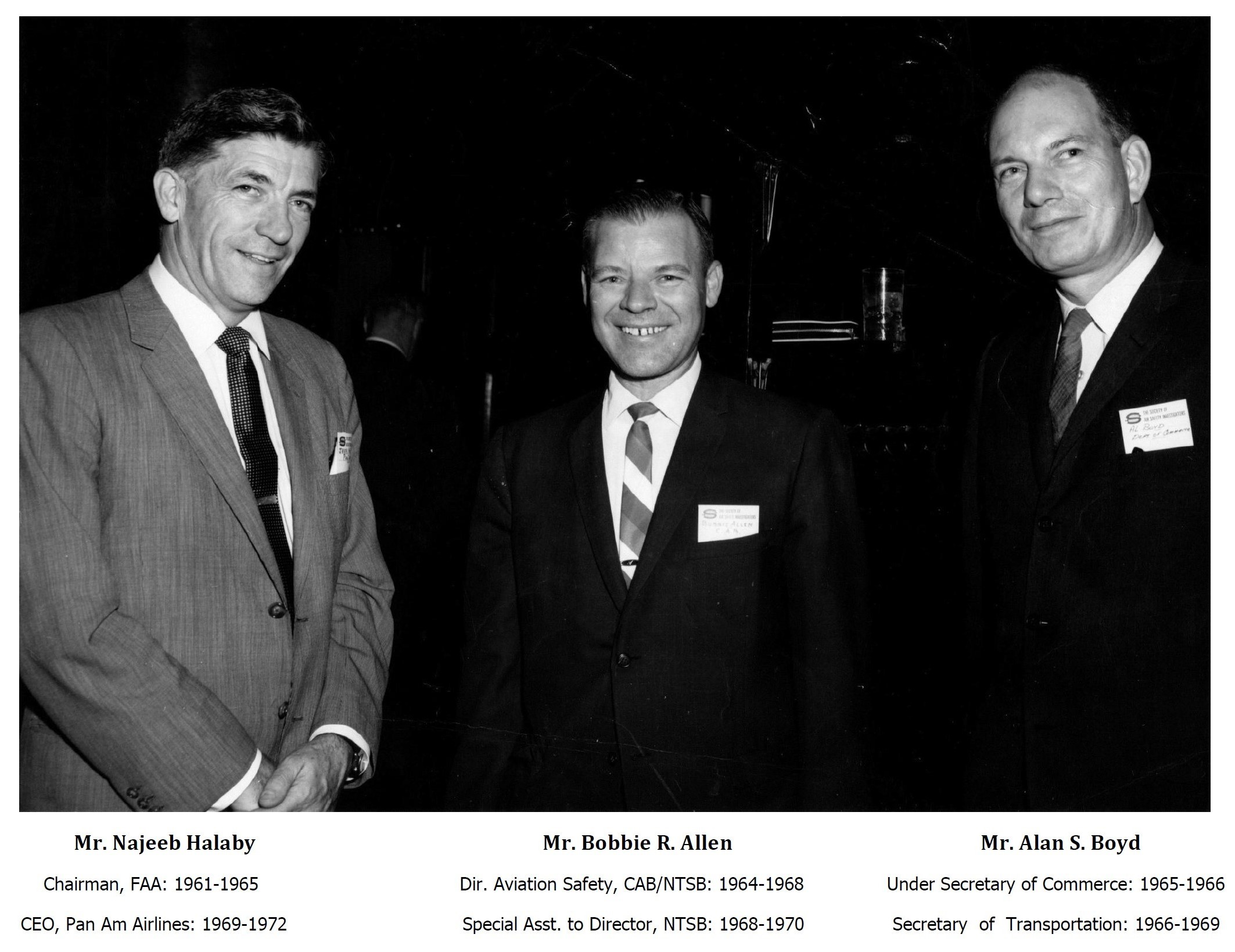
Najeeb Halaby, Bobbie R. Allen, Alan S. Boyd at SASI event c. 1965

As the first chairman of the board of trustees of the National Aircraft Accident Investigation School at Oklahoma City, Allen was instrumental in organizing the school where students and investigators from around the world would attend.

Allen and his teams authored "The Potential Role of Flight Recorders in Aircraft Accident Investigation" and a design study titled "Aircraft Design-Induced Pilot Error", both of which were broadly used by the aviation community.

Allen was instrumental in establishing the "Go Team" for catastrophic accident investigations. This "Team Concept" is still used today by the NTSB as well as numerous other nations of the world. In 1967, Allen was a member of the task force which planned the organization and staffing of the Department of Transportation.

== Origin of the Aviation Safety Reporting System ==
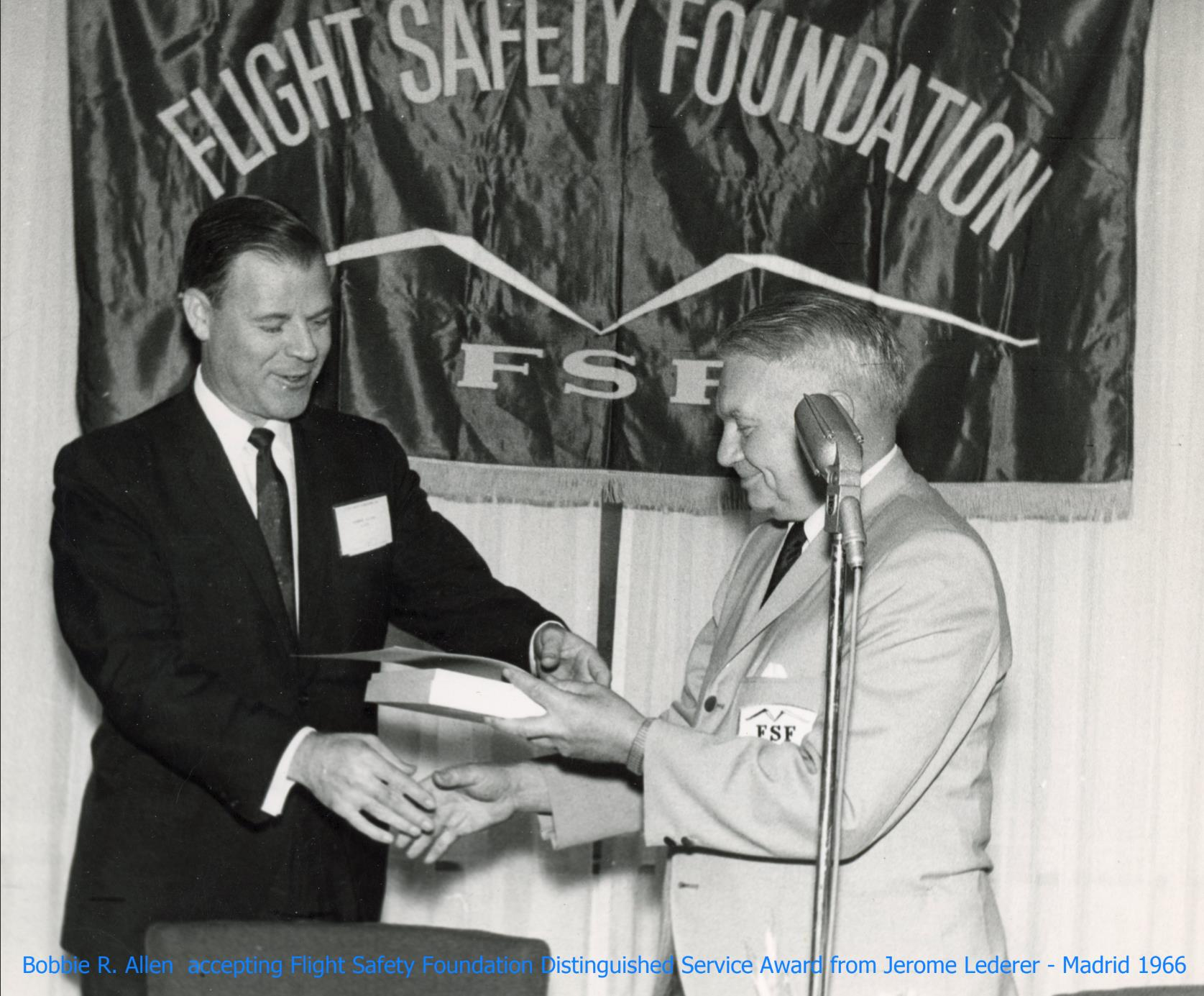
Jerome F. Lederer presents Flight Safety Foundation's Distinguished Service Award on behalf of the CAB to director, Bobbie R. Allen in Madrid, 1966

In 1966 – twelve years before the Aviation Safety Reporting System (ASRS) was launched – Allen, as director of the Bureau of Aviation Safety, was advocating the use of computers and the concept of non-punitive incident reporting. In a November 1966 speech at a Flight Safety Foundation seminar in Madrid, Allen stated:

We must find a way of moving this raw material for accident prevention to the processing machine.... What is it, then, that stands in the way of communicating this incident information to the appropriate governmental agency for processing? Repeatedly, when this question is asked, one hears the reply-FEAR: fear of litigation; fear of regulation; fear of punitive action."

At a 1968 SMU speech in Dallas, Texas, Allen again spoke of using computers for accident prevention:

We intend to exploit its memory and data retrieval capabilities to the maximum extent possible, not only in after-the-fact learning from past history but in safety projections for the future.... We in the Board are endeavoring to define and apply the lessons learned from accident investigations and special safety studies using to the extent possible electronic computers to identify those subtle and elusive common denominators in accident causation. In this increasingly important task, we welcome the on-going cooperative efforts of all concerned in the aviation community."

By mid 1968, due to declining health, Allen had stepped down as director, but continued efforts to overcome the industry's reluctance to participate. In his role as Special Assistant to the director, he dedicated much of his time promoting the project. He traveled extensively, wrote documents, gave speeches, and often communicated with industry leaders.

On a December 3, 1969, internal Airlines for America meeting, ARINC (Aeronautical Radio Incorporated) reported to the membership that a majority of the airlines surveyed, had chosen not to participate in the program. After receiving this news, Allen would share the results with NTSB leadership and although they thought there would soon be acceptance, implementation would be stalled for years.

In December 1974, two years after Allen's death at age 50, TWA Flight 514 would crash into a Virginia mountaintop. After investigators learned that similar circumstances had occurred on a United Airlines flight just six weeks earlier a scramble ensued to overcome the public's outcry and in May 1975, the FAA announced the inauguration of a confidential, non-punitive incident reporting scheme. In January 1978, final design review of the system would begin, and the system would be called the Aviation Safety Reporting System.

Allen's work in the mid- to late 1960s laid the groundwork for NASA's Aviation Safety Reporting System. His concepts were the basis of the Aviation Safety Reporting System.

== Naval Aviator (1943–1968) ==
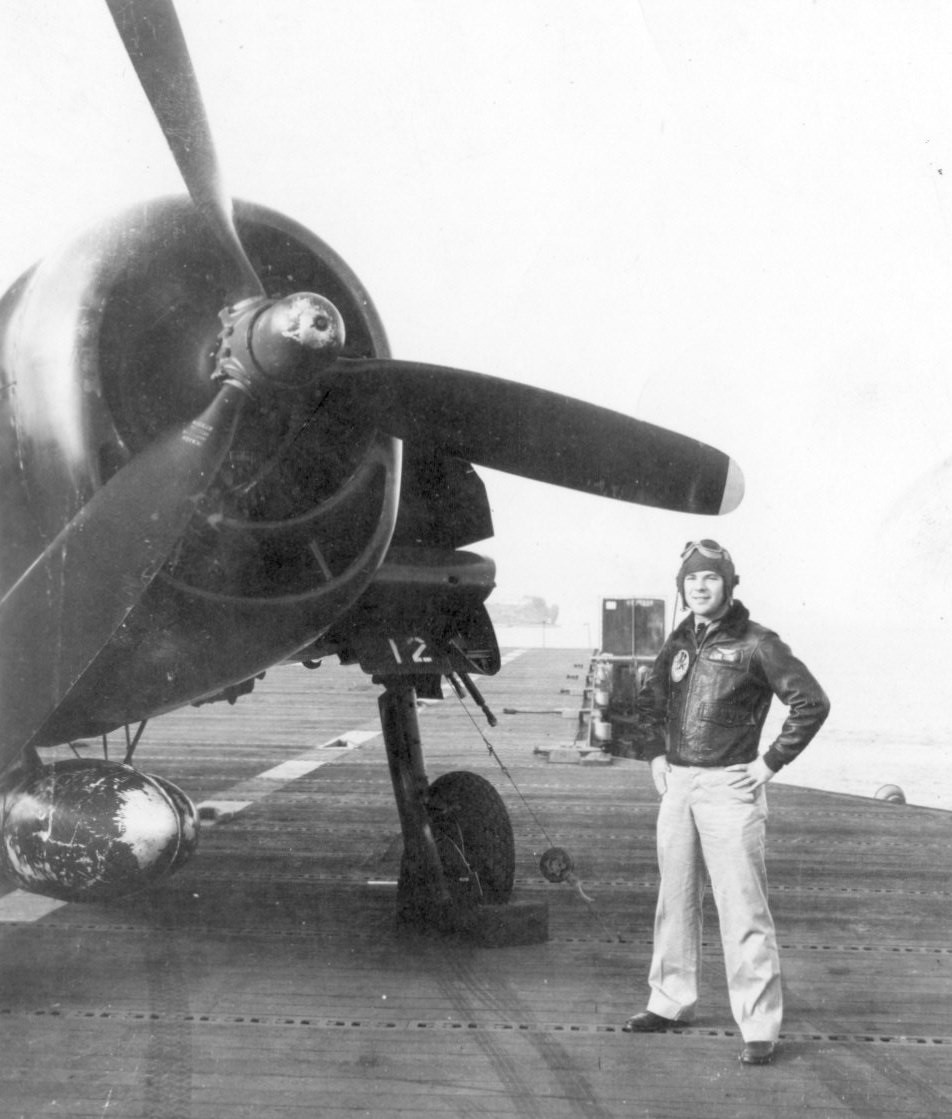
Lieutenant JG Allen shown after a trap in a Grumman F6F, 1945

Allen served during WWII in the Pacific theater. He was assigned to Night Fighter Squadron VF-52(N) (Night Mares) flying the Grumman F6F Hellcat from the USS Roi (CVE-103), USS Saratoga (CV-3), USS Corregidor (CVE-58), USS Tripoli (CVE-64), USS Bon Homme Richard (CV-31).

In late 1952, Allen was recalled to Active Duty for the Korean War. He was executive officer of Night Fighter Squadron VC-4 DET44(N) (the Nightcappers) flying the Douglas F3D Skyknight.

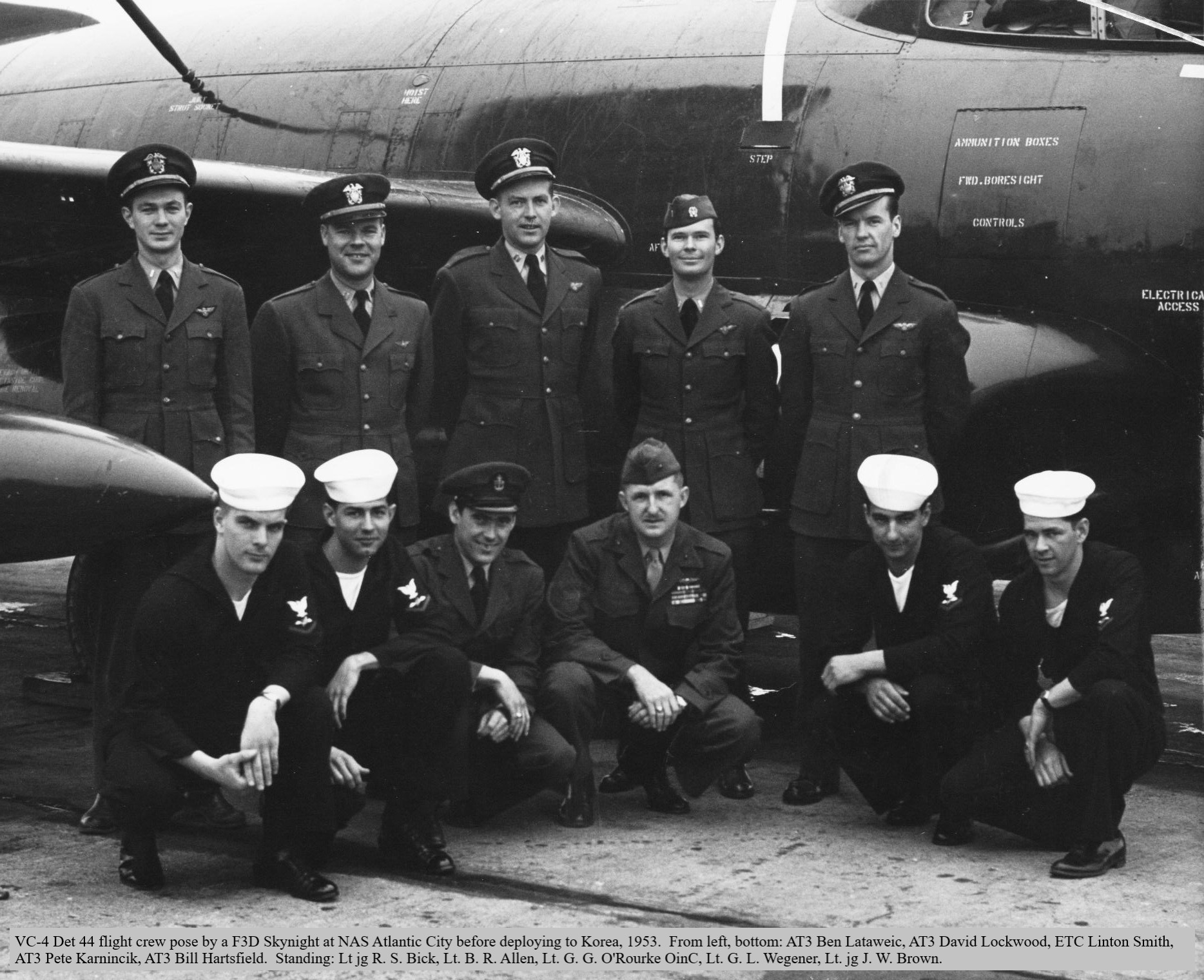
Crew members of VC-4 DET44(N) at NAS Atlantic City in early 1953

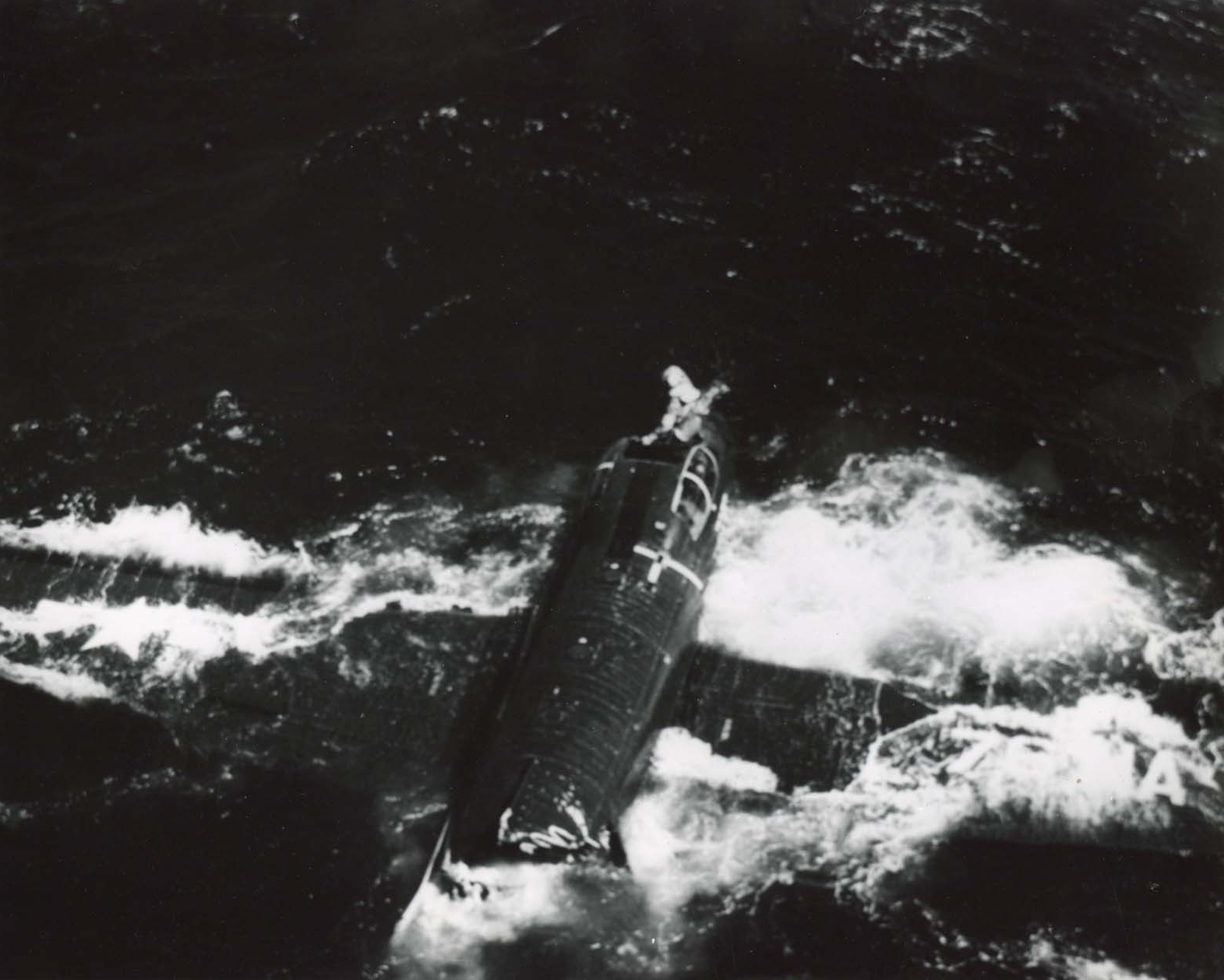
Lt. Allen seen escaping his F3D Skyknight after a Cold Cat Shot aboard the USS Roosevelt in 1953

On March 4, 1953, 100 miles off the coast of Virginia, the "Nightcappers" were training on the USS Franklin D. Roosevelt (CV-42). On Allen's last of five launches for the day, the ship's catapult bridle failed, and his plane rolled forward, too fast to stop, and too slow to fly. He had no choice but to ditch the aircraft. Within seconds, the carrier, cruising at 30 knots, cut the plane in half, just forward of the empennage. Allen climbed out and was hoisted aboard a rescue helicopter, surviving the incident.

Several weeks later, the squadron boarded the USS Lake Champlain (CVA-39) and sailed to Korea where they joined Marine Squadron VMF-513 at K-6 Airbase in Pyeongtaek South Korea providing bomber escort and night combat air patrol over North Korea until late 1953. After returning to the states, Allen would remain on active duty until 1959, when he accepted an Aircraft Accident Investigation position with the Civil Aeronautics Board.

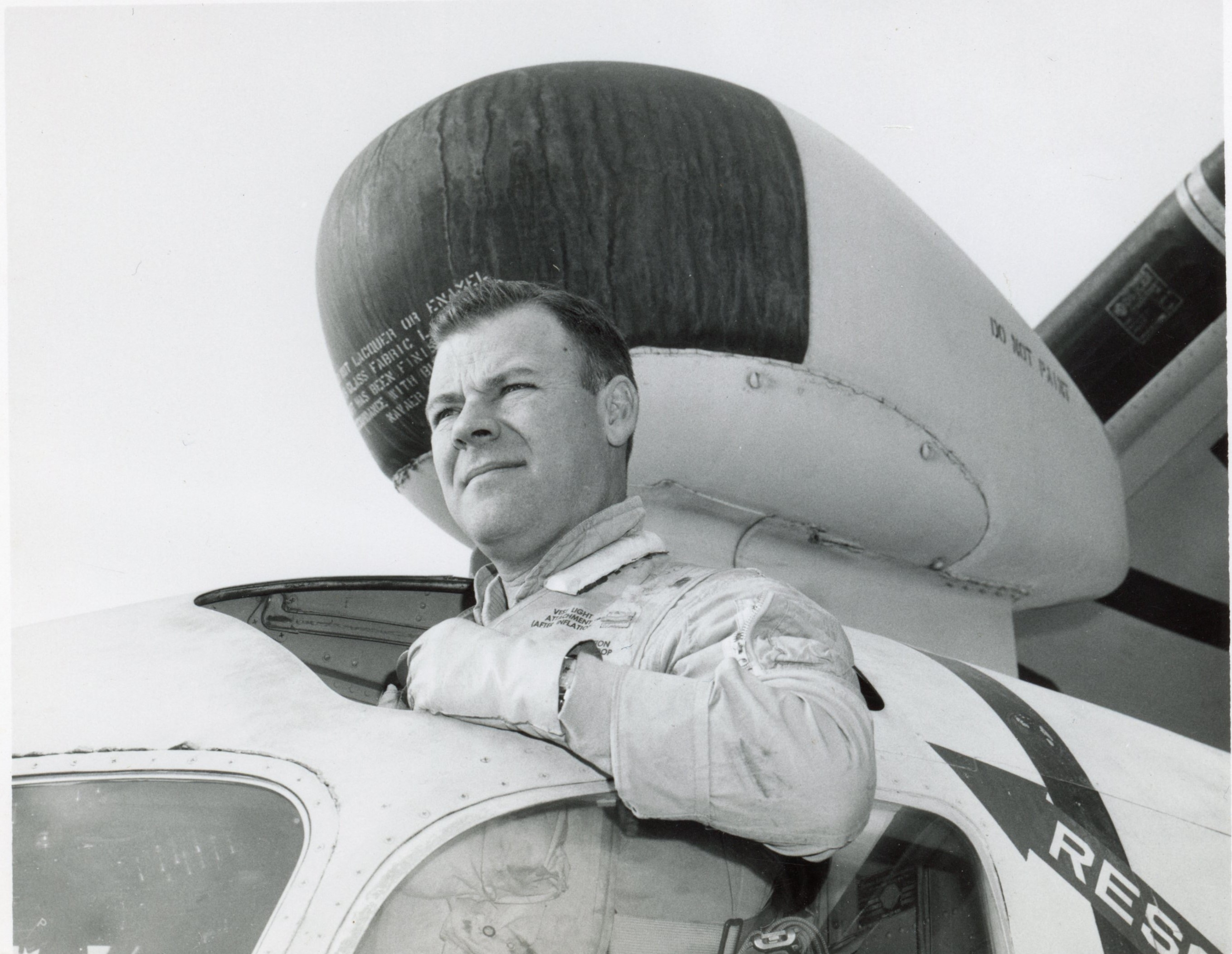
Cdr Allen seen in an S2F Tracker in 1961

During the Berlin Crisis of 1961, Allen was recalled to active duty, and served as commanding officer of VS-721(Eagle Scouts). Based at NAS Whidbey Island Washington, the squadron operated S2F Trackers patrolling waters off the Pacific Northwest coast, searching for Soviet submarines using airborne Anti-Submarine Warfare techniques until August 1962.

From 1963 to 1966, Allen was aviation safety officer of AWS-66 at Andrews Air Force Base, Maryland. In 1963, he participated in "Global Strategy Discussions" at the U.S. Naval War College in Newport, Rhode Island, and on March 4, 1966, he was promoted to captain.

Letter of appointment to grade of Captain, from Rear Admiral William I. Martin, 4 March 1966

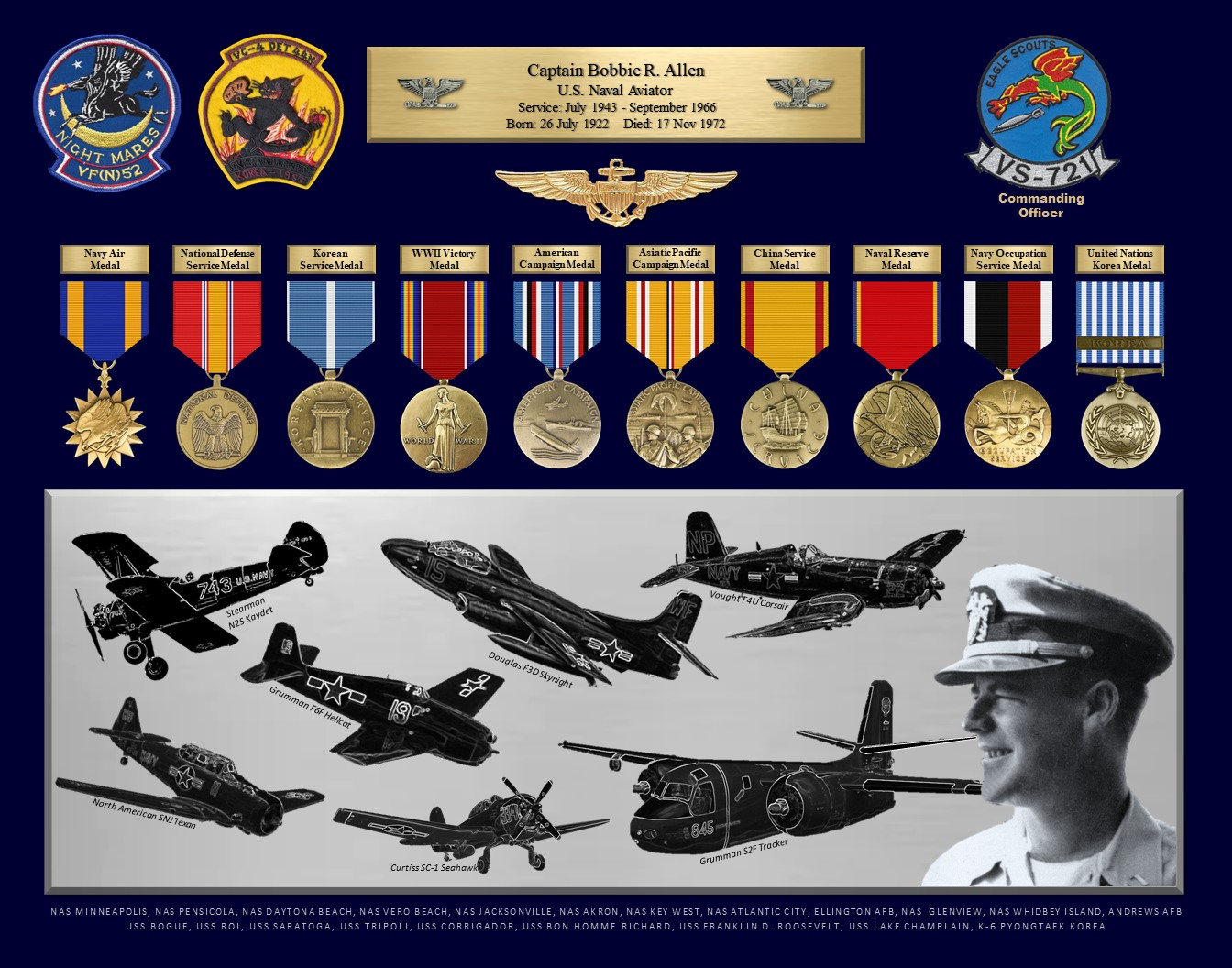
Navy service record collage

Aviation qualifications/certifications
All-Weather Pilot, Carrier Qualified Day / Night, Single Engine Propeller, Multi Engine-Jet
Patrol Plane Commander, Multi-engine Propeller
Special Instrument Rating
Instrument Check Pilot, Single and Multi-engine, Propeller and Jet
Tactics Flt Instructor, Single and Multi-Engine-Propeller, Single Engine Seaplane-Propeller, Multi Engine-Jet
Maintenance Officer (Airframe)
Operations Officer
Aviation Technical Training Officer
Type Training Officer
Aviation Safety Officer
Command at Sea

Military and Civilian Education
	Location	Type	Course
1942	Marshall, TX	Civilian	High School, Graduated 1942
1942–43	Kilgore, TX	Civilian	Kilgore Jr. College, Navy V-5 Program
1943	Moraga, CA	Civilian	St. Mary's College, Navy V-5 Program
1944	Pensacola, FL	Military	U.S. Navy Flight Training, Commissioned Ensign, Designated Naval Aviator
1944	Vero Beach, FL	Military	Operational Flight Training, Night Fighter-Carrier
1944	Quanset Pt, RI	Military	Night Attack/Combat Flight Training, Night Fighter-Carrier (NACTU-lant)
1946	Pensacola, FL	Military	Operational Flight Training, Seaplane Scout/Observation-Cruiser/Battleship
1948	Wichita, KS	Civilian	University of Kansas, Wichita Extension, Kansas Fire School
1952	Key West, FL	Military	Navy All Weather Flight School
1955–56	Akron, OH	Civilian	Night School Student
1957	Los Angeles, CA	Civilian	Aviation Safety School
1959	Los Alamitos, CA	Military	Naval Air Electronics Training
1964	Newport, RI	Military	Senior Reserve Officer's Course, Naval War College

Military Aircraft Qualified
Boeing Stearman N2S Kaydet
Vaultee SNV Valiant
North American SNJ Texan
Curtiss SC Seahawk
Douglas R5D Skymaster
Douglas F3D Skyknight
Douglas R4D Skytrain
Vought F4U Corsair
Vought OS2U Kingfisher
Grumman F6F Hellcat
Grumman F8F Bearcat
Grumman S2F Tracker
McDonnell F2H Banshee
Lockheed P2V-5F Neptune
Lockheed TV-2 Shooting Star

Military Decorations
Navy Air Medal
National Def Service Medal
Korean Service Medal
WWII Victory Medal
American Campaign Medal
Asiatic Pacific Campaign Medal
China Service Medal
Naval Reserve Medal
Navy Occupation Service Medal
United Nations Korea Medal

== Personal life ==
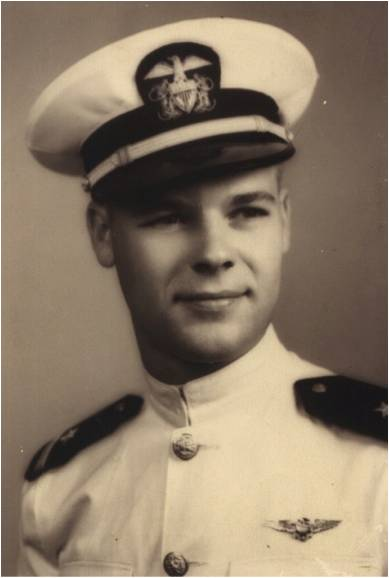
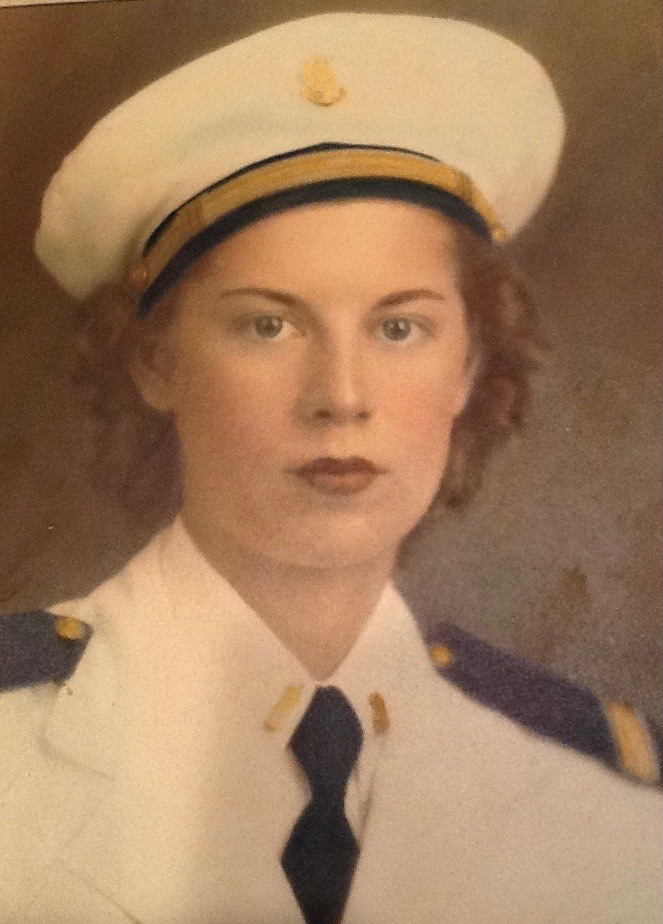
Ensign Bobbie R. Allen and Lieutenant JG Arlene E. Allen, pictured in 1944

Bobbie Ray Allen and his wife Arlene, a Nurse in the U.S. Navy Nurse Corps from Akron, Ohio, were married on November 18, 1944, at Vero Beach, Florida. They were each stationed at NAS Pensacola when they happened to meet because of a mail delivery mix-up. After resolving the errant mail issue, the two began dating and within several months, decided to marry. As required by Naval regulation, Mrs. Allen resigned her commission and returned to her home in Akron Ohio where she would wait for Ensign Allen to complete fighter training. During their marriage, they raised five children.
