= Najeeb Halaby =

American businessman and government official

Najeeb E. Halaby
- نجيب حلبي
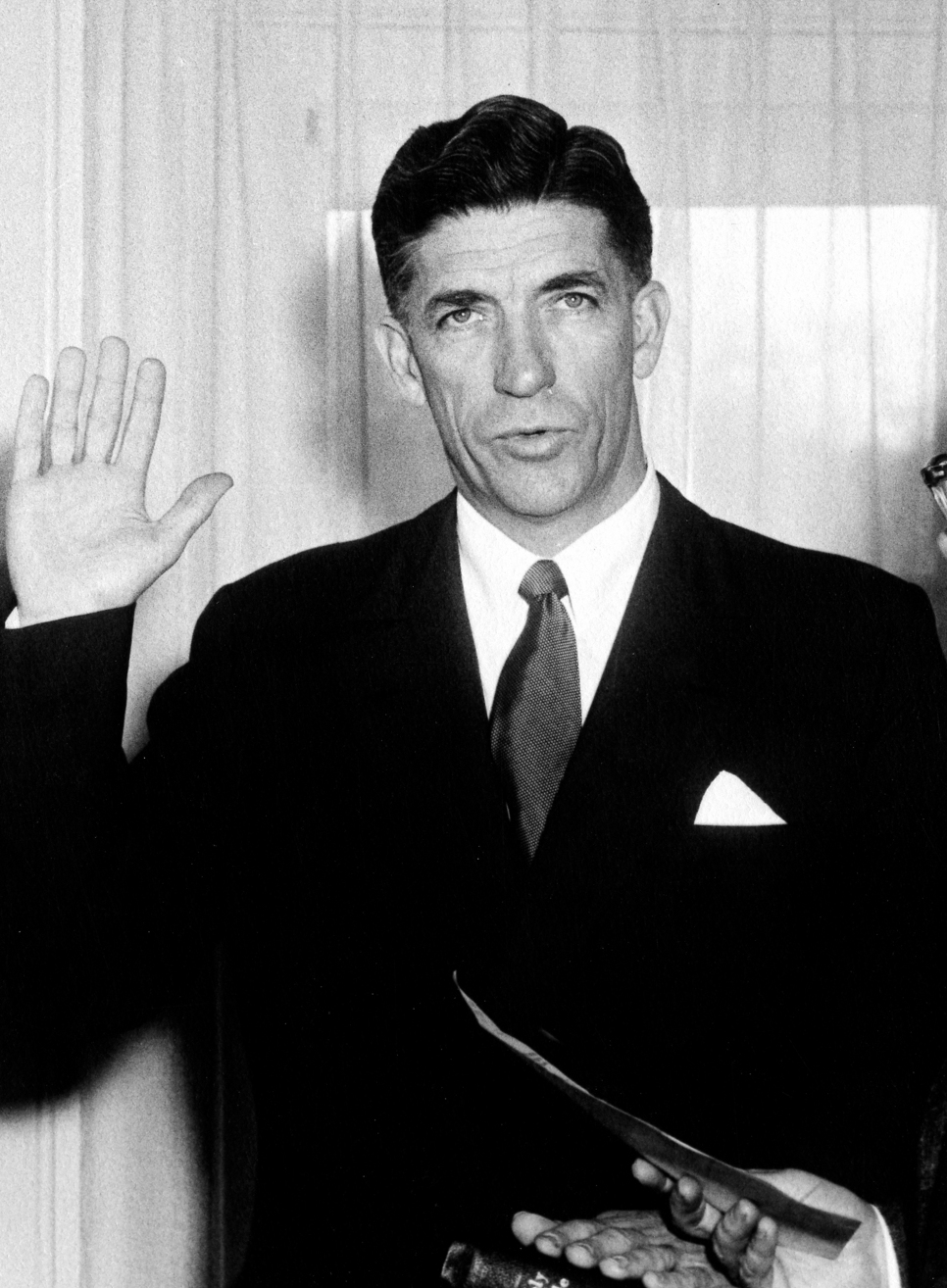
- Halaby in 1961

2nd Administrator of the Federal Aviation Administration
- In office March 3, 1961 – July 1, 1965
- Preceded by: Elwood Richard Quesada
- Succeeded by: William F. McKee

Personal details
- Born: Najeeb Elias Halaby Jr. November 19, 1915 Dallas, Texas, U.S.
- Died: July 2, 2003 (aged 87) McLean, Virginia, U.S.
- Spouses: Doris Carlquist (m. 1945; div. 1977) Jane Allison Coates (m. 1980; died 1996) Libby Anderson Cater (m. 1997)
- Children: 3, including Queen Noor of Jordan
- Education: Stanford University (BA); Yale University (LLB)
- Occupation: Aviator, government official, businessman

Najeeb Elias "Jeeb" Halaby Jr. (Arabic: نجيب إلياس حلبي; November 19, 1915 – July 2, 2003) was an American businessman, government official, and aviator, and the father of Queen Noor of Jordan. As a United States Navy test pilot he is known for making the first transcontinental flight by a jet aircraft. He also served as chairman of Pan Am from 1969 to 1972.

== Early life and ancestry ==
Halaby was born in Dallas, Texas. His father was Najeeb Elias Halaby (March 17, 1878/1880 – December 16, 1928), a Syrian Christian who was born in Damascus and whose parents hailed from Aleppo, arriving in the United States in 1891. Halaby's paternal grandfather was Elias Halaby, a provincial treasurer or magistrate in Ottoman Syria, who also came to the United States in 1891.

Halaby's father worked as an importer, and later as an oil broker. In the mid-1920s he opened Halaby Galleries, a rug boutique and interior-decorating shop, at Neiman Marcus in Dallas, and ran it with his American wife, Halaby's mother, Laura Halaby (nee Wilkins) (April 23, 1889 – April 1987). His father died shortly afterward, and his estate was unable to continue the new enterprise. Following the death of Halaby's father, Laura Halaby married Urban B. Koen, but they ultimately divorced. Halaby's maternal grandfather was John Thomas Wilkins, who served in the 7th Tennessee Cavalry during the American Civil War.

== Career ==
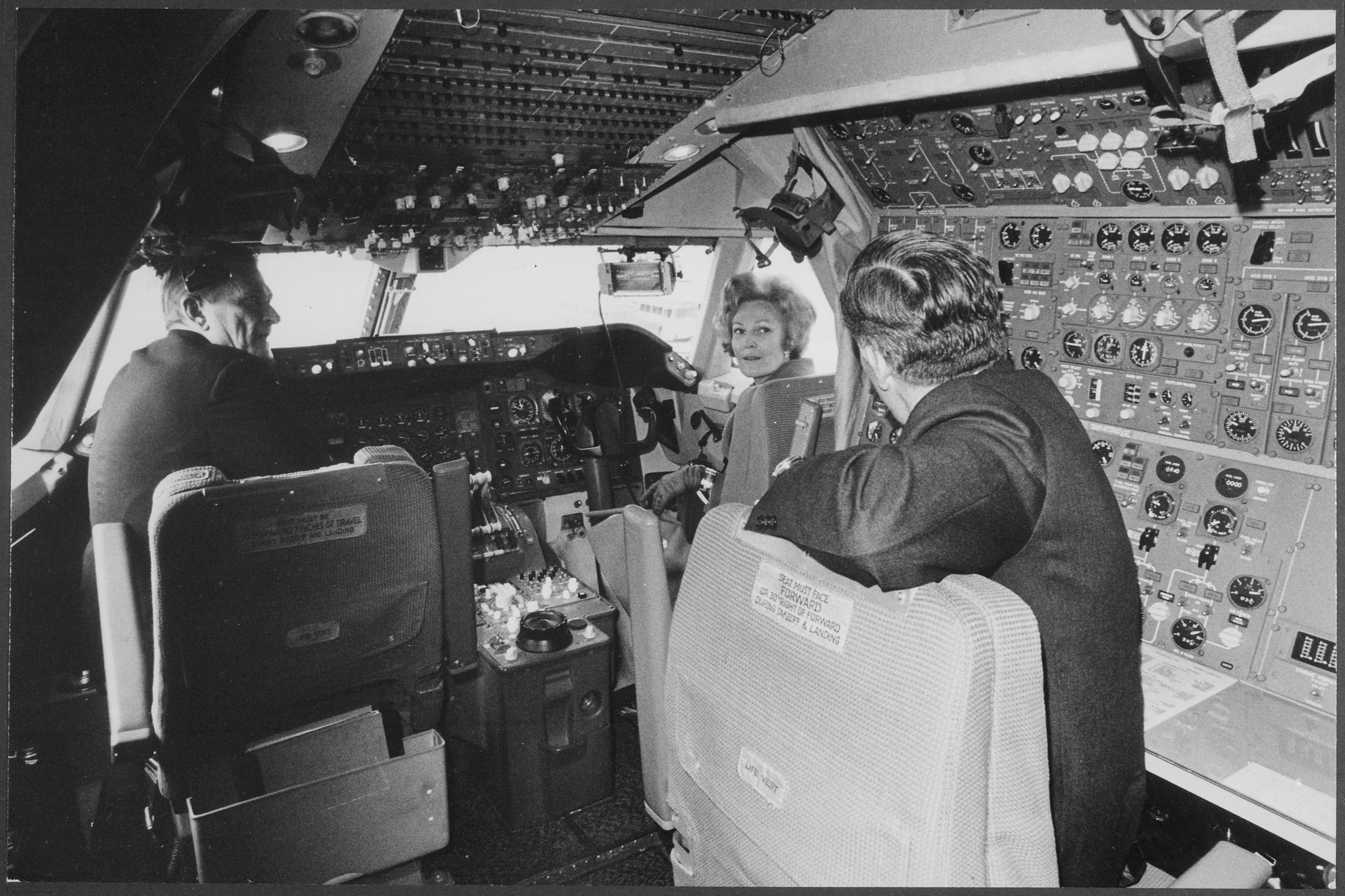
(L to R) Secretary of Transportation John Volpe, First Lady of the United States Pat Nixon, and Najeeb Halaby in the cockpit of Pan Am Boeing 747 N735PA, Clipper Young America, at the christening ceremony for the plane, 1970

Halaby was a graduate of The Leelanau School, a boarding school in Glen Arbor Township, Michigan, and is enshrined in that school's Hall of Fame. An alumnus of Stanford University (1937) and Yale Law School (1940), he served as a U.S. Navy test pilot during World War II. On May 1, 1945, Halaby made history by making the first transcontinental jet flight in U.S. history. Halaby took off from Muroc Air Force Base in California, in a Lockheed YP-80 Shooting Star, landing at Naval Air Station Patuxent River in Maryland, 5 hours and 40 minutes later.

After the war he served as the U.S. State Department's civil aviation advisor to King Abdul Aziz Ibn Saud of Saudi Arabia, helping the King develop Saudi Arabian Airlines. Next, he worked as an aide to Secretary of Defense James Forrestal in the late 1940s, then helped Paul Nitze write NSC 68. He joined Laurance Rockefeller's family office in 1953, reviewing investments in civil aviation.

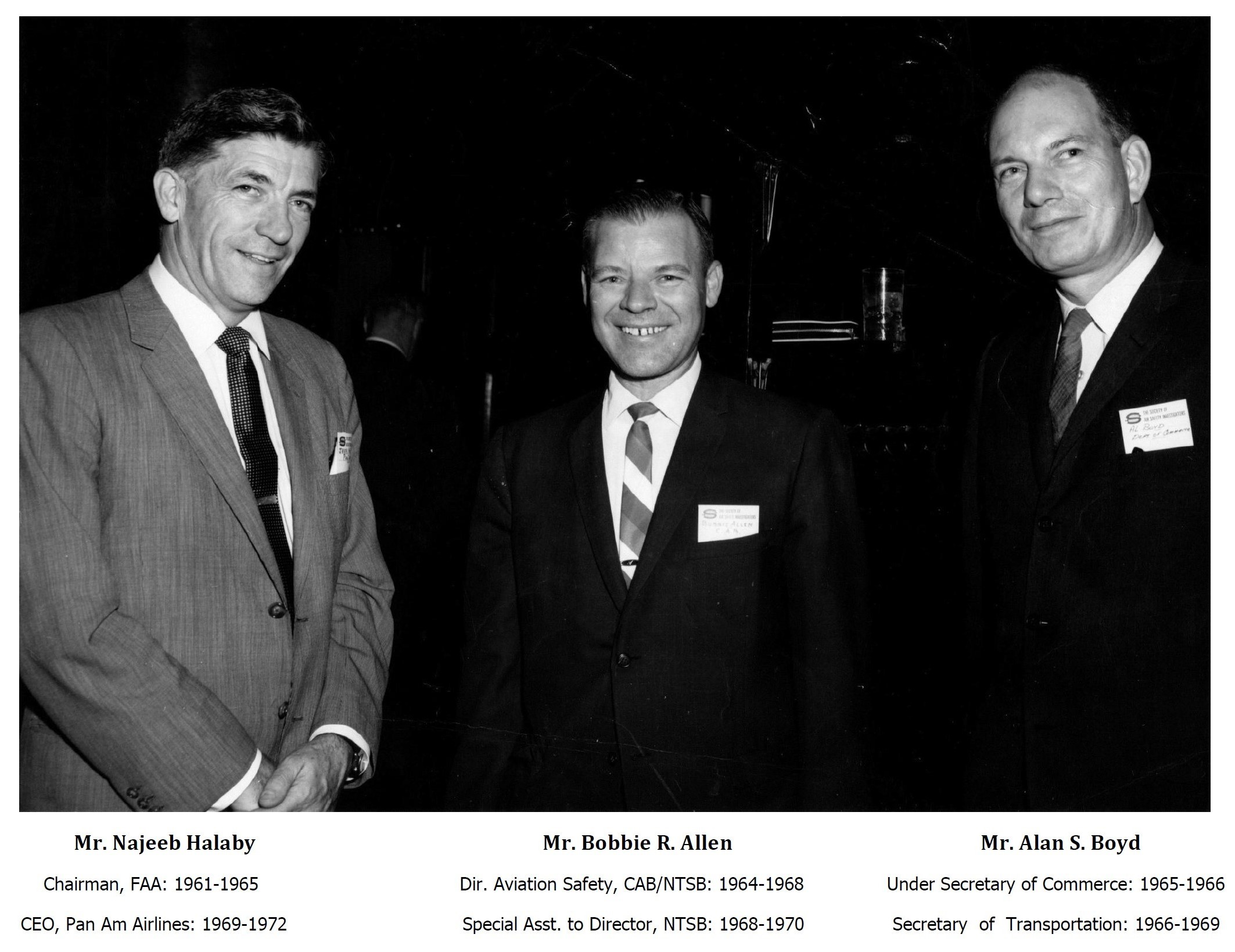
Najeeb Halaby, Bobbie R. Allen, Alan S. Boyd at AISI event abt. 1965

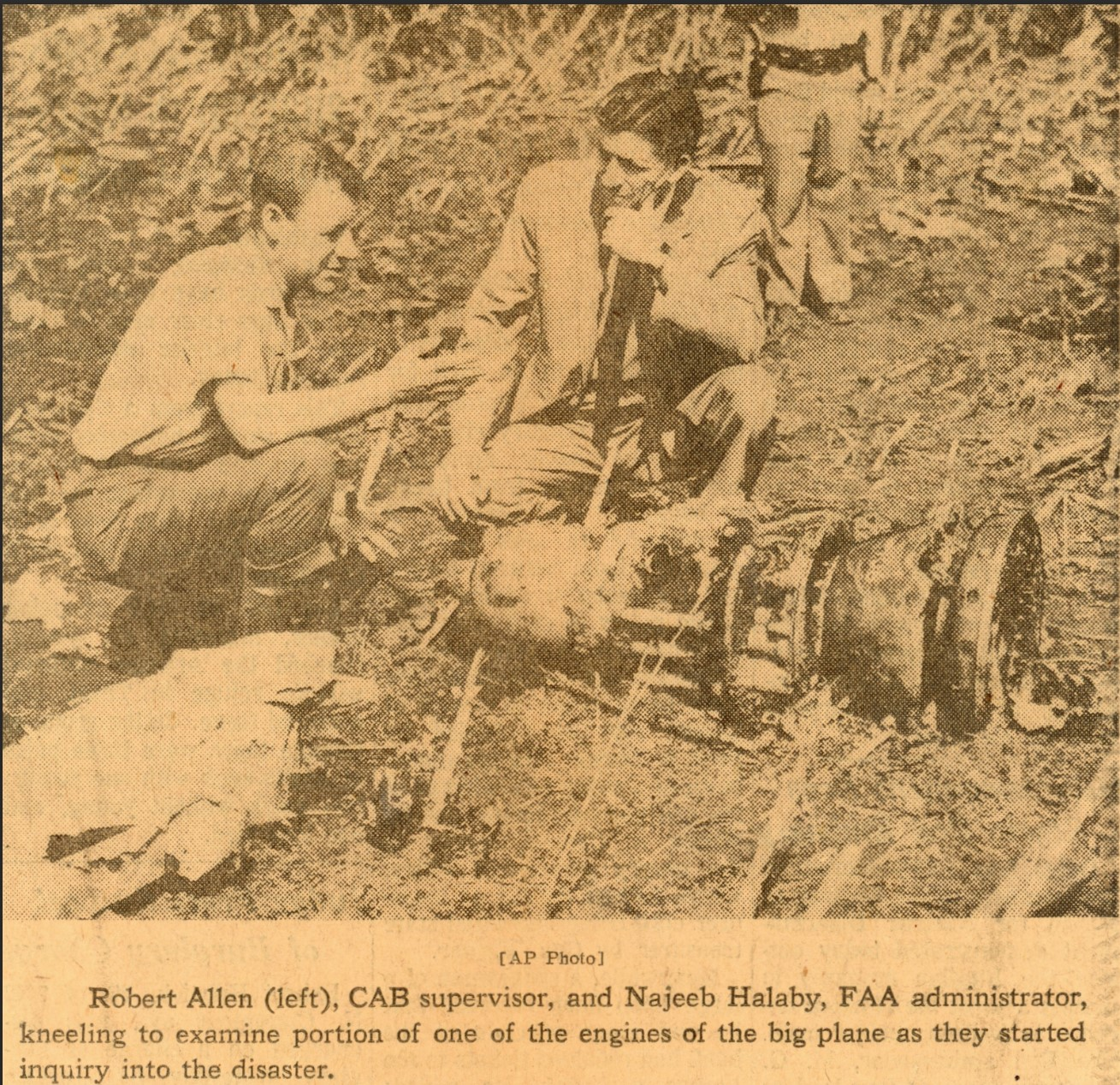
CAB Supervisor Bobbie R. Allen and FAA Administrator Najeeb Halaby discuss accident details abt. 1963

From 1961 to 1965, he served as the second Administrator of the Federal Aviation Agency (FAA) – the future Federal Aviation Administration, having been appointed by President John F. Kennedy. Halaby was a proponent for the creation of the United States Department of Transportation, which occurred in April 1967 during his time in the Lyndon B. Johnson administration. During his tenure as FAA administrator, he also was the lead proponent of the Boeing 2707 Supersonic Jet. President Johnson signed Executive Order 11149 approving $1 billion to build a US-made SST, but eventually the project was cancelled in 1971 because of its cost.

From 1969 to 1972, he served as CEO, and chairman after 1970, of Pan American World Airways. As Pan American World Airways chairman, he was present at the christening of the first Boeing 747 aircraft in 1970.

== Personal life ==
Halaby was married three times. He married Doris Carlquist in Washington, D.C., on December 24, 1945; they divorced in 1977. They had three children: daughter Lisa, who became Queen of Jordan in 1978; son Christian; and daughter Alexa. He attended the state funeral of his son-in-law King Hussein as a member of the United States delegation in February 1999.

He married Jane Allison Coates in 1980; she died in 1996. Then from 1997, when he was aged 81, until his death in 2003 at age 87, Halaby was married to Libby Anderson Cater.

Government offices
Preceded by Elwood Quesada	Administrator of the Federal Aviation Administration; 1961–1965	Succeeded by William F. McKee
Business positions
Preceded by Harold E. Gray	Chief Executive Officer of Pan Am; 1969–1972	Succeeded by William Seawell
