= Maternal near miss =

Event in which a pregnant woman comes close to death but does not die

A maternal near miss (MNM) is an event in which a pregnant woman comes close to maternal death, but does not die – a "near-miss". Traditionally, the analysis of maternal deaths has been the criterion of choice for evaluating women's health and the quality of obstetric care. Due to the success of modern medicine such deaths have become very rare in developed countries, which has led to an increased interest in analyzing so-called "near miss" events.

== Background ==
Maternal mortality is a sentinel event to assess the quality of a health care system. The standard indicator is the Maternal Mortality Ratio, defined as the ratio of the number of maternal deaths per 100,000 live births. Due to improved health care the ratio has been declining steadily in developed countries. For example, in the UK 1952-1982 the ratio was halving every 10 years. In the European Union the ratio has now stabilized at around 10 to 20.

The small number of cases makes the evaluation of maternal mortality practically impossible Historically, the study of negative outcomes have been highly successful in preventing their causes, this strategy of prevention therefore faces difficulties when if the number of negative outcome drop to low levels. In the UK, for example, the most dramatic decline in maternal death was achieved in Rochdale, an industrial town in the poorest area of England. In 1928 the town had a Maternal Mortality Ratio of over 900 per 100,000 live births, more than double the national average of the time. An enquiry into the causes of the deaths reduced the ratio to 280 per 100,000 pregnancies by 1934, only six years later, then the lowest in the country.

The very low figures of maternal mortality have therefore stimulated an interest in investigating cases of life-threatening obstetric morbidity or maternal near miss. There are several advantages of investigating near miss events over events with fatal outcome:

- Near miss are more common than maternal deaths.
- Their review is likely to yield useful information on the same pathways that lead to severe morbidity and death.
- Investigating the care received may be less threatening to providers because the woman survived.
- One can learn from the women themselves since they can be interviewed about the care they received.

The growing interest is reflected in an increasing number of systematic reviews on the prevalence of near miss. The studies and reviews span...

- Analytic attempts to define the concept more strictly.
- Descriptive efforts to measure and quantify new indicators (prevalence) of near-miss for different geographical regions etc.
- Explanatory efforts of the leading cause for morbidity.

== Definition ==
The World Health Organization defines a maternal near-miss case as "a woman who nearly died but survived a complication that occurred during pregnancy, childbirth or within 42 days of termination of pregnancy."

== Identification criteria ==
According to the World Health Organization, if a woman presents any of the conditions below during pregnancy, childbirth or within 42 days of termination of pregnancy and survives, she is considered as a maternal near miss case.

Cardiovascular dysfunction

- Shock
- Cardiac Arrest
- Severe hypoperfusion (lactate >5 mmol/L or >45 mg/dL)
- Severe acidosis (pH<7.1)
- Use of continuous vasoactive drugs
- Cardio-pulmonary resuscitation

Respiratory dysfunction

- Acute cyanosis
- Gasping
- Severe tachypnea (respiratory rate>40 breaths per minute)
- Severe bradypnea (respiratory rate<6 breaths per minute)
- Severe hypoxemia (O2 saturation <90% for ≥60min or PAO2/FiO2<200)
- Intubation and ventilation not related to anaesthesia

Renal dysfunction

- Oliguria which is non responsive to fluids or diuretics
- Severe acute azotemia (creatinine >300 μmol/ml or >3.5 mg/dL)
- Dialysis for acute renal failure

Coagulation dysfunction

- Failure to form clots
- Severe acute thrombocytopenia (<50,000 platelets/ml)
- Massive transfusion of blood or red cells (≥ 5 units)

Hepatic dysfunction

- Jaundice in the presence of pre-eclampsia
- Severe acute hyperbilirubinemia (bilirubin>100 μmol/L or >6.0 mg/dL)

Neurologic dysfunction

- Prolonged unconsciousness or coma (lasting >12 hours)
- Stroke
- Uncontrollable fit / status epilepticus
- Global paralysis

Uterine dysfunction

- Hysterectomy due to uterine infection or haemorrhage

== Sources ==
- Adisasmita, Asri; et al. (2008). "Obstetric near miss and deaths in public and private hospitals in Indonesia". BMC Pregnancy and Childbirth. 8 (10): 10. doi:10.1186/1471-2393-8-10. PMC 2311270. PMID 18366625.
- Dott, M; N . Orakail; H . Ebadi; F . Hernandez; K . MacFarlane; P . Riley; R . Prepas; B . McCarthy (2005). "Implementing a Facility-Based Maternal and Perinatal Health Care Surveillance System in Afghanistan". Journal of Midwifery & Women's Health. 50 (4): 296–300. doi:10.1016/j.jmwh.2005.02.013. PMID 15973266. (uses the term near-miss maternal death)
- Lewis, Gwyneth (2003). "Beyond the Numbers: reviewing maternal deaths and complications to make pregnancy safer". British Medical Bulletin. 67 (1): 27–37. doi:10.1093/bmb/ldg009. PMID 14711752.
- Marsh, Geoffrey; Mary Renfrew (1998). Community-based Maternity Care. Oxford University Press. ISBN 0-19-262768-6.
- Minkauskienė, Meilė; Rūta Nadišauskienė; Žilvinas Padaiga1; Said Makari (2004). "Systematic review on the incidence and prevalence of severe maternal morbidity" (PDF). Medicina. 40 (4): 299–309. PMID 15111741.
- Minkauskiene, Meile (n.d.). "Incidence/prevalence of severe maternal morbidity - a literature review. Review prepared for the 12th Postgraduate Course in Reproductive Medicine and Biology, WHO, Geneva, Switzerland". Geneva Foundation for Medical Education and Research.
- Say L, Souza JP, Pattinson RC; WHO working group on Maternal Mortality and Morbidity classifications. Maternal near miss—towards a standard tool for monitoring quality of maternal health care. Best Pract Res Clin Obstet Gynaecol. 2009 Jun;23(3):287-96.
- Tingle, John; Jo Wilson; Andrew Symon (2002). Clinical Risk Management in Midwifery. Elsevier Health Sciences. ISBN 0-7506-2851-0.
