= Harold E. Gray =

American pilot and airline executive

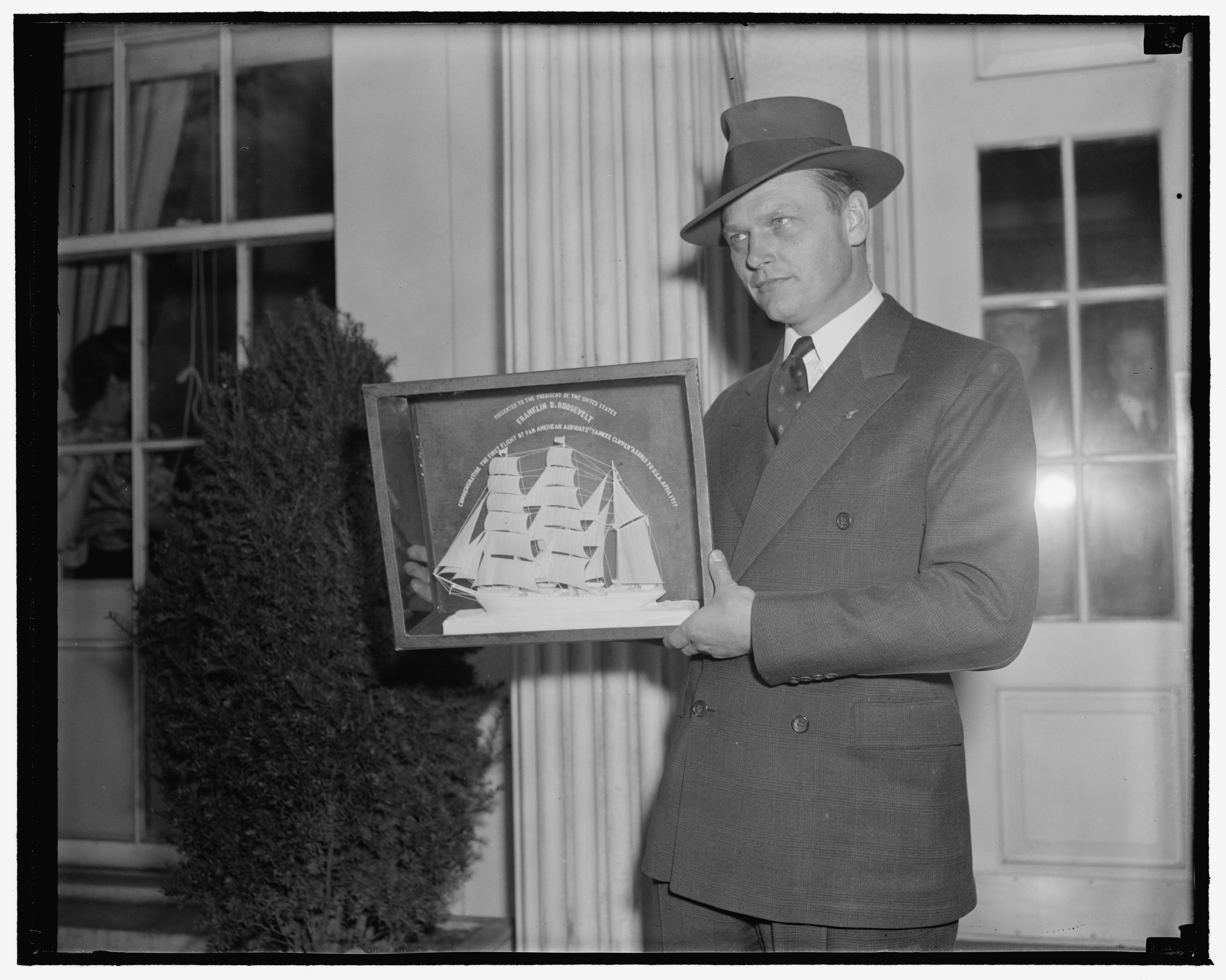

Chairman of Pan American Corp.
- In office 1968–1970
- Preceded by: Juan Trippe
- Succeeded by: Najeeb Halaby

CEO of Pan American Corp.
- In office 1968–1969
- Preceded by: Juan Trippe
- Succeeded by: Najeeb Halaby

President of Pan American Corp.
- In office 1964–1968
- Preceded by: Juan Trippe
- Succeeded by: Najeeb Halaby

Personal details
- Born: April 15, 1906 Guttenberg, Iowa, U.S.
- Died: December 23, 1972 (aged 66) New York City, U.S.
- Education: University of Detroit

Harold Edwin Gray (April 15, 1906 – December 23, 1972) was an American pilot and executive for Pan American World Airways who was CEO from 1968 to 1969.

== Early life and education ==
Gray was born on April 15, 1906, in Guttenberg, Iowa. He attended the University of Iowa, but dropped out after his sophomore year to take flight training at the Army Air Corps Training Center in San Antonio, Texas. He later graduated from the University of Detroit with a degree in aeronautical engineering.

== Early aviation career ==
Gray began his aviation career with the Ford Motor Company, flying their Ford Trimotor airplanes. He then worked for Sky View Lines, flying tourists over Niagara Falls.

== Pan Am ==
=== Pilot ===
In 1928, Gray was working for Sky View in Miami when met the staff of Pan Am. He was hired as the company's the tenth pilot. His first assignment was to fly a hazardous route over the jungles of South America. In 1934 he qualified as Pan Am's first master of ocean flying boats. Between 1937 and 1939 he piloted Pan Am's first survey flights to Bermuda, Ireland, Southampton, the Azores, Lisbon, and Marseille.

On March 29–30, 1939, Gray piloted the Yankee Clipper on the first ever trans-Atlantic passenger flight. The first leg of the flight, Baltimore to Horta, Azores, took 17 hours and 32 minutes and covered 2,400 miles. The second leg from Horta to Pan Am's newly built airport in Lisbon took 7 hours and 7 minutes and covered 1,200 miles. Following the flight, Gray described the flight over the radio for the National Broadcasting Company.

In 1941, Gray piloted the Cape Town Clipper on what was then the world's longest proving flight. He flew 19,000 miles from La Guardia Airport in New York City to Léopoldville in the Belgian Congo and back.

In 1947, Gray retired from flying.

=== Executive ===
In 1944, Gray became the operations manager for Pan Am's Atlantic division. Two years later he became the assistant manager in charge of planning for the Atlantic division. In 1949 he was placed in charge of the Pacific-Alaska division. In 1952 he was named executive vice president, Atlantic division. In 1959 he was elected to the board of directors.

In July 1964, Gray was elected president of Pan Am, succeeding company founder Juan Trippe, who remained as chairman and chief executive officer. In May 1968, Trippe retired and Gray was elected to succeed him as chairman and chief executive officer.

In November 1969, Gray stepped down as CEO. He was succeeded by company president Najeeb Halaby. He remained the company's chairman until May 1970 when he retired due to illness.

During his tenure as a Pan Am executive, Gray was known for improving the company's technical, safety, and operating standards.

== Death ==
Gray died on December 23, 1972, of cancer at Columbia-Presbyterian Medical Center in New York City.
