= Northwest Orient Airlines Flight 6231 =

1974 aviation accident in New York

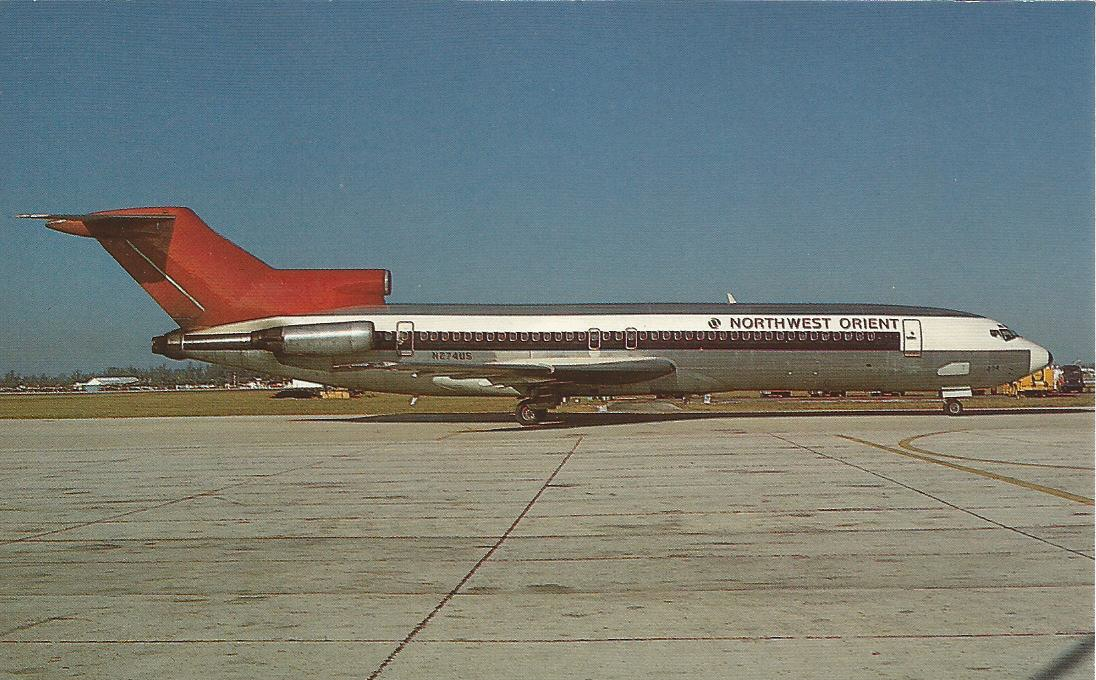
- N274US, the aircraft involved in the accident, seen in 1970

Accident
- Date: December 1, 1974
- Summary: Stalled due to atmospheric icing, pilot error, and instrument failure
- Site: Haverstraw, New York, U.S (near Stony Point); 41°12′54.86″N 74°5′21.49″W

Aircraft
- Aircraft type: Boeing 727-251
- Operator: Northwest Orient Airlines
- Registration: N274US
- Flight origin: John F. Kennedy International Airport, New York City
- Destination: Buffalo International Airport
- Occupants: 3
- Passengers: 0
- Crew: 3
- Fatalities: 3
- Survivors: 0

Northwest Orient Airlines Flight 6231 was a Northwest Airlines charter flight from John F. Kennedy International Airport, New York City, to Buffalo International Airport, Buffalo, New York, where it was to pick up the Baltimore Colts professional football team. On December 1, 1974, the Boeing 727 serving the flight crashed in Harriman State Park near Stony Point, New York, just north of the New York City area.

All three crew members on board died when the aircraft struck the ground following a stall and rapid descent caused by the crew's reaction to erroneous airspeed readings caused by atmospheric icing. The icing occurred as a result of failure to turn on the pitot tube heating at the start of the flight. This was one of two Boeing 727s to crash in the eastern U.S. that day; the other was TWA Flight 514 in northern Virginia, northwest of Dulles airport (250 miles (400 km) to the southwest).

== Aircraft ==
The Boeing 727-251, registration N274US, was certificated and maintained in accordance with FAA regulations and requirements at the time of the crash.

== Accident ==
The flight was chartered to pick up the Baltimore Colts in Buffalo after the aircraft originally earmarked to transport the team was grounded by a snowstorm in Detroit. On that Sunday of Thanksgiving weekend, the eastern half of the U.S. experienced severe weather, with high winds, snow, and rain.

The aircraft was loaded with 48,500 pounds (22,000 kg) of Jet A fuel, with a gross weight of 147,000 pounds (67,000 kg) at takeoff.

Flight 6231 departed New York City's John F. Kennedy International Airport at 19:14 EST (UTC−5) for a ferry flight to Buffalo. As the craft climbed past 16,000 feet (4,900 m), the overspeed warning horn sounded, followed 10 seconds later by a stick shaker stall warning. The aircraft leveled at 24,800 feet (7,600 m) in a 30° nose-up attitude, until it started to descend out of control in a right-hand spin, reaching a vertical acceleration of +5g due to the aircraft being in a tight nosedown spiral with a bank angle between 70° and 80°.

At 19:24:42, Flight 6231 issued a "Mayday" call to New York air traffic control, and stated "...we're out of control, descending through 20,000 feet (6,100 m)." After giving interim altitude clearance, at 19:25:21, the controller inquired as to what the problem was, and a crewmember responded once more, "We're descending through 12,000 feet (3,700 m), we're in a stall." The crew of Flight 6231 attempted to make one final transmission 19 seconds prior to impact, but it was not received.

At about 3,500 feet (1,100 m), a large portion of the aircraft's horizontal stabilizer separated due to the high G-forces, making recovery impossible. Flight 6231 struck the ground in a slightly nose down and right wing-down attitude twelve minutes after take-off, at 19:25:57; there were no witnesses to the crash.

The aircraft had descended from 24,000 feet (7,300 m) altitude to ground level at 1,090 feet (330 m) above sea level in 83 seconds. The crash occurred about 3.2 nautical miles (5.9 km; 3.7 mi) west of Thiells, New York. Police described the crash site as a heavily wooded marshy area and accessibility was hampered by winter weather conditions including wind and a rain-snow mix. Despite the 727's full load of fuel, there was no explosion or fire when the plane hit the ground, and there was no post-crash fire, although police described the crash site having a "strong smell of jet fuel."

== Crew ==
The aircraft had three crewmembers on board. Captain John B. Lagorio, age 35, had worked for Northwest for almost nine years. He had just under 7,500 flying hours flying experience, with just under 2,000 hours total time flying the Boeing 727. The first officer, Walter A. Zadra, 32, had been working for Northwest for almost seven years. He had about 4,700 hours flying experience, of which two-thirds was as a second officer (flight engineer). His Boeing 727 experience amounted to about 1,250 hours, but only 46 of that was as a pilot – the other 1,200 hours experience was as a flight engineer. The second officer, James F. Cox, 33, had been with the airline for almost six years and had 1,600 hours experience as a Boeing 727 Flight Engineer.

== Investigation ==
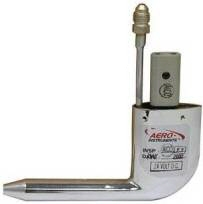
An example of a pitot head

The National Transportation Safety Board (NTSB) led the accident investigation and released its final report on August 13, 1975.

Investigators found that the flight crew had not activated the pitot head heaters and the pitot tubes had become blocked with ice which caused the crew to receive incorrect airspeed readings. Believing the readings were true, the crew pulled back on the control column and raised the nose, which caused the aircraft to stall.

From the NTSB report's abstract:

...the probable cause of this accident was the loss of control of the aircraft because the flightcrew failed to recognize and correct the aircraft's high angle of attack, low-speed stall and its descending spiral. The stall was precipitated by the flightcrew's improper reaction to erroneous airspeed and Mach indications which had resulted from a blockage of the pitot heads by atmospheric icing.

When investigators analyzed the 727's voice recorder, the recording revealed that the pilots believed that the shaking of the stick shaker mechanism was caused by the airliner reaching the speed of sound, and not a warning that it was going into a stall.

== See also ==
- Aeroperú Flight 603
- Birgenair Flight 301
- Austral Líneas Aéreas Flight 2553
- Air France Flight 447
- Air Algérie Flight 5017
- Saratov Airlines Flight 703
- Indonesia Air Asia Flight 8501
- TWA Flight 514: Another Boeing 727 which crashed on the same day
