= Confidential incident reporting =

System to allow safety problems to be reported in confidence

A confidential incident reporting system is a mechanism which allows problems in safety-critical fields such as aviation and medicine to be reported in confidence. This allows events to be reported which otherwise might not be reported through fear of blame or reprisals against the reporter. Analysis of the reported incidents can provide insight into how those events occurred, which can spur the development of measures to make the system safer.

== Examples ==
The Aviation Safety Reporting System, created by the US aviation industry in 1976, was one of the earliest confidential reporting systems. The International Confidential Aviation Safety Systems Group is an umbrella organization for confidential reporting systems in the airline industry.

Other examples include:

- CIRAS, (Confidential Incident Reporting and Analysis System), the confidential reporting system for the British railway industry
- CHIRP, (Confidential Human Factors Incident Reporting Programme / Confidential Hazardous Incident Reporting Programme) a confidential reporting system for the British aviation and maritime industries
- CROSS (Confidential Reporting on Structural Safety), a confidential reporting system for the structural and civil engineering industry

It has been suggested that medical organizations also adopt the confidential reporting model. Examples of confidential reporting in medicine include CORESS, a confidential reporting system for surgery in the United Kingdom.

== See also ==
- Mandatory reporting
- Near miss (safety)
- Root cause analysis
- Safety engineering
