= Jerome F. Lederer =

American aerospace engineer

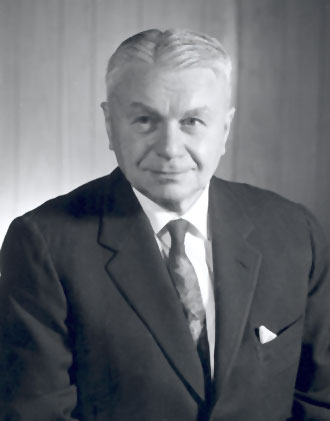
Jerome Lederer, c. 1967

Jerome F. Lederer (September 26, 1902 – February 6, 2004) was an American aviation-safety pioneer, known as "Mr. Aviation Safety."

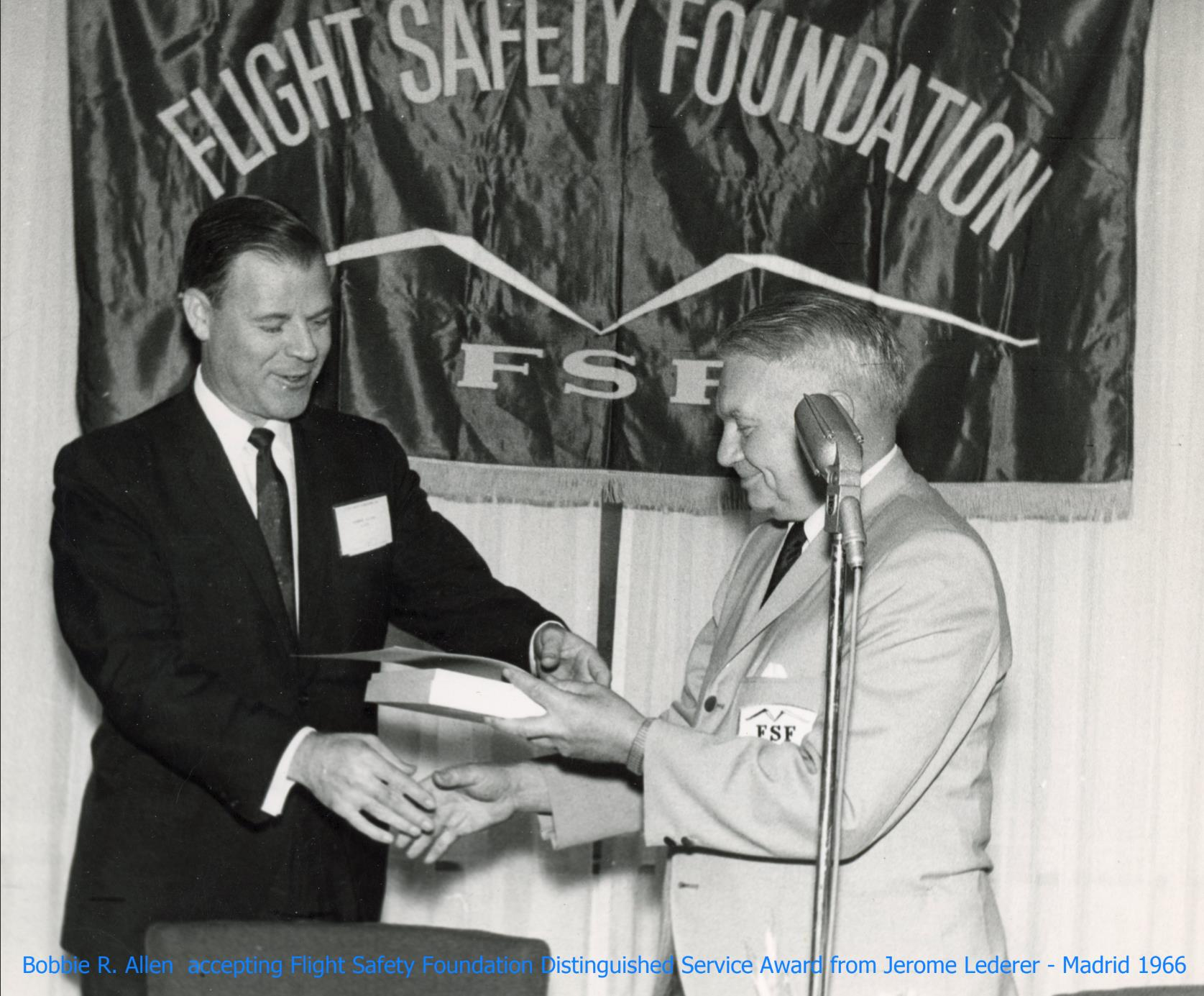
Jerome F. Lederer presents Flight Safety Foundation's Distinguished Service Award, to Bobbie R. Allen, Director of the Civil Aeronautics Board in Madrid, 1966

He was born in New York City. He received a BSC in mechanical engineering with aeronautical options in 1924 and an M.E. in 1925 from New York University. In 1926, he was hired by the United States Postal Service to oversee its plane maintenance. Lederer helped reduce pilot fatality by devising film crash tests and redesigning the exhaust stacks and other systems. From 1929 to 1940, he served as chief engineer for aviation insurance underwriters. In 1940, he accepted an appointment as director of the Civil Aeronautics Board's Safety Bureau. He resigned in 1942 to become director of the Airlines War Training Institute. He trained 10,000 airmen and 35,000 mechanics for the Air Transport Command, and was a safety consultant to the 2nd Air Force.

In 1947, he organized the Flight Safety Foundation and was its director until 1967. The Foundation provides global exchange of information on aircraft accident prevention. In 1967, following the deaths of three astronauts at the Kennedy Space Center, NASA appointed him director of the Office of Manned Space Flight Safety for the Apollo Program. In 1970, he became director of safety for all of NASA.

In 1987, Lederer was the recipient of the Tony Jannus Award for his distinguished contributions to commercial aviation. He died of congestive heart failure in Laguna Hills, California, at the age of 101.

Lederer was inducted into the International Space Hall of Fame in 1992.

== Trivia ==
He inspected the Spirit of St. Louis before Charles Lindbergh's trans-Atlantic flight. "I did not have too much hope that he would make it," he admitted years later. "I just went out because I was a friend of his, and I wanted to see the airplane, to look the situation over."

The International Society of Air Safety Investigators yearly awards the Jerome F Lederer Award for "outstanding contributions to technical excellence in accident investigation."

The Flight Safety Foundation "Jerome F. Lederer Safety Leadership Medal" recognizes an individual or team for making a significant contribution to the advancement of civil aviation safety.
