= TWA Flight 514 =

1974 aviation accident in Virginia

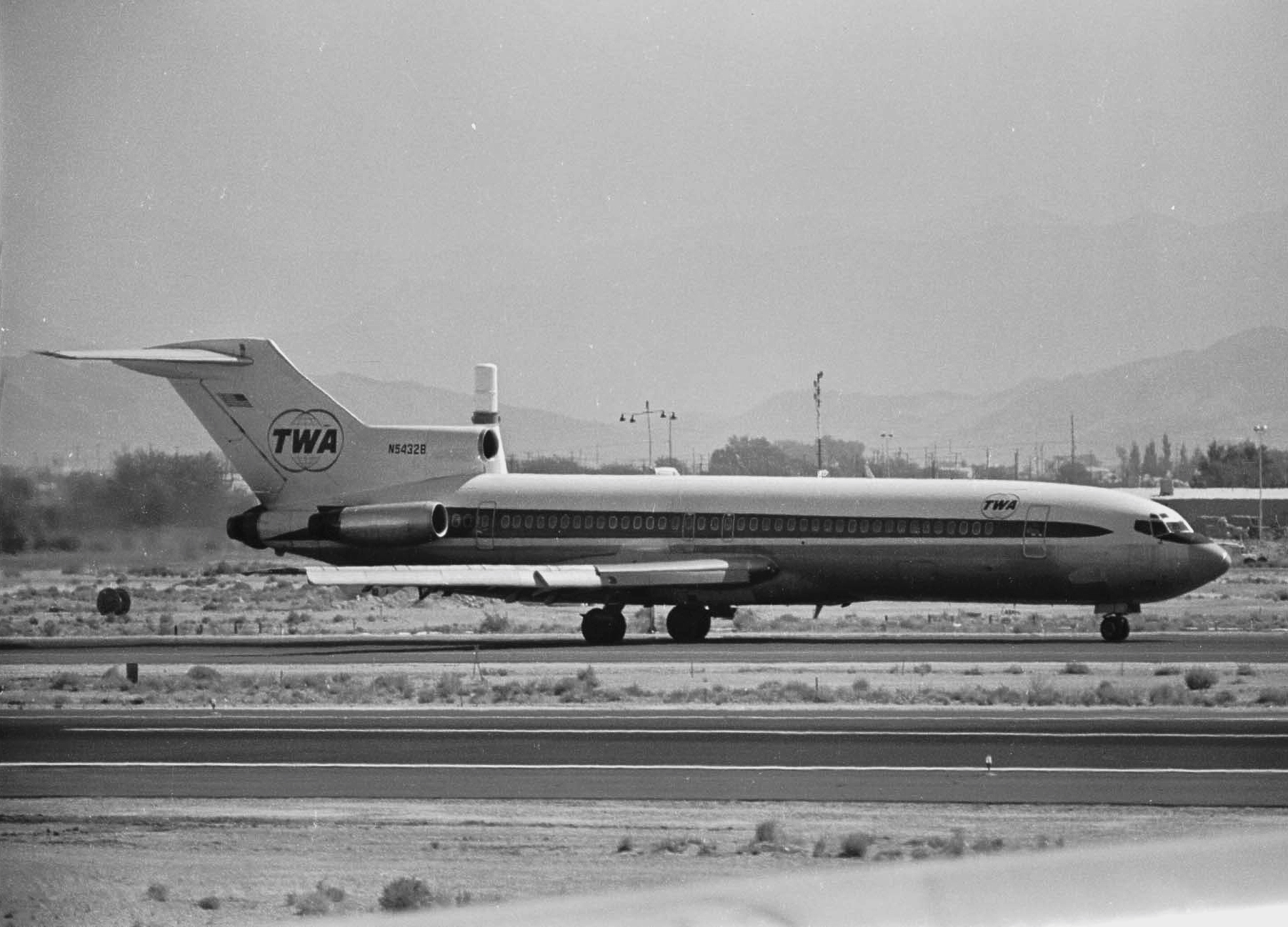
- N54328, the aircraft involved in the accident, seen in September 1974

Accident
- Date: December 1, 1974
- Summary: Controlled flight into terrain due to pilot error and ATC error
- Site: Mount Weather, Clarke County, Virginia, United States; 39°4′36″N 77°52′54″W

Aircraft
- Aircraft type: Boeing 727-231
- Operator: Trans World Airlines
- IATA flight No.: TW514
- ICAO flight No.: TWA514
- Call sign: TWA 514
- Registration: N54328
- Flight origin: Indianapolis International Airport, Indianapolis, Indiana, United States
- 1st stopover: Port Columbus International Airport, Columbus, Ohio, United States
- Destination: Washington Dulles International Airport diverted from Washington National Airport
- Occupants: 92
- Passengers: 85
- Crew: 7
- Fatalities: 92
- Survivors: 0

Trans World Airlines Flight 514 was a domestic scheduled flight of Trans World Airlines from Indianapolis, Indiana, and Columbus, Ohio, to Washington National Airport. On December 1, 1974, the Boeing 727-231 serving the flight was diverted to Washington Dulles International Airport but crashed into Mount Weather, Virginia. All 92 occupants aboard, 85 passengers and 7 crew members, died. In stormy conditions late in the morning, the aircraft was in controlled flight and struck a low mountain 25 nautical miles (46 km; 29 mi) northwest of its revised destination.

The accident was one of two crashes involving Boeing 727 aircraft in the United States that day, the other being the crash of Northwest Orient Airlines Flight 6231 later that evening near Haverstraw, New York.

== Background ==
=== Aircraft ===
The aircraft involved was a Boeing 727-231, registered as N54328. It was manufactured by Boeing Commercial Airplanes on March 3, 1970, and in its four years of service, it had logged 11,997 hours and 10 minutes of flying time. It was powered by three Pratt & Whitney JT8D-9A engines.

=== Crew ===
In command was Captain Richard I. Brock, aged 44, who had logged around 6,900 hours of flying time, 2,899 hours of which were logged on the Boeing 727. His co-pilot was First Officer Lenard W. Kreshec, aged 40, who had logged 6,205 hours of flying time, including 1,160 hours logged on the Boeing 727. The flight engineer was Thomas C. Safranek, aged 31, who had logged 2,798 hours of flying time, 128 of which were logged on the Boeing 727.

== Accident ==
On Sunday morning of Thanksgiving weekend, the eastern half of the United States experienced severe weather, with high winds, snow, and rain. The flight was scheduled for arrival at Washington National Airport, but was diverted to Dulles when high crosswinds, east at 28 knots (32 mph; 52 km/h) and gusting to 49 knots (56 mph; 91 km/h), prevented safe operations on the main north–south runway at Washington National.

The flight was being vectored for a non-precision instrument approach to runway 12 at Dulles, a heading of east-southeast. Air traffic controllers cleared the flight down to 7,000 feet (2,130 m) before clearing them for the approach while not on a published segment.

The jetliner began a descent to 1,800 feet (550 m), shown on the first checkpoint for the published approach. The cockpit voice recorder later indicated there was some confusion in the cockpit over whether they were still under a radar-controlled approach segment which would allow them to descend safely. After reaching 1,800 feet (550 m) there were some 100-to-200-foot (30 to 60 m) altitude deviations which the flight crew discussed as encountering heavy downdrafts and reduced visibility in snow.

At 11:09:22 a.m. EST (UTC−5), the plane impacted the west slope of Mount Weather at 1,670 feet (510 m) above sea level at approximately 230 knots (265 mph; 425 km/h). The wreckage was contained within an area about 900 by 200 feet (275 by 60 m). The evidence of first impact were trees sheared off about seventy feet (20 m) above the ground; the elevation at the base of the trees was 1,650 feet (505 m).

The wreckage path was oriented along a line 118 degrees magnetic. Calculations indicated that the left wing went down about six degrees as the aircraft passed through the trees and the aircraft was descending at an angle of about one degree. After about 500 feet (150 m) of travel through the trees, it struck a rock outcropping at an elevation of about 1,675 feet (510 m). Numerous heavy components of the aircraft were thrown forward of the outcropping, and numerous intense post-impact fires broke out which were later extinguished. The mountain's summit is at 1,754 feet (535 m) above sea level.

== Investigation ==
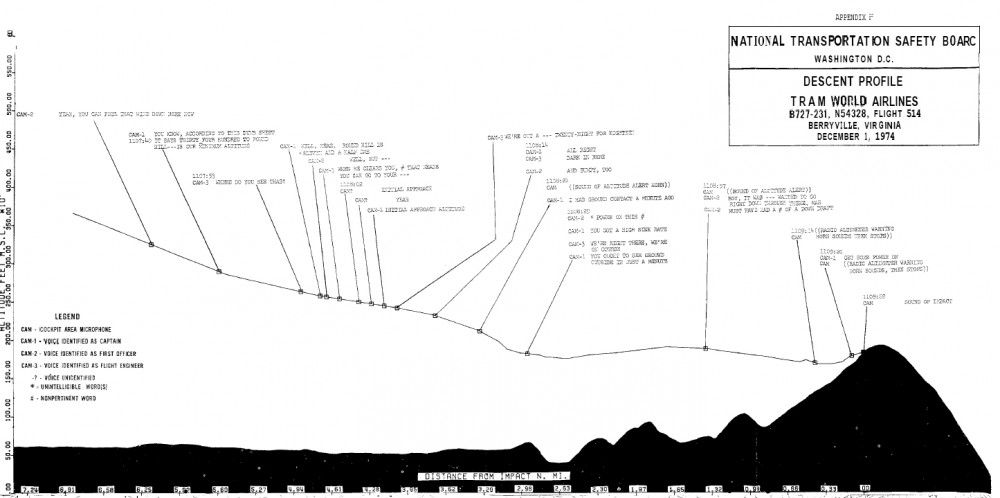
The flight path of Flight 514

The accident investigation board was split in its decision as to whether the flight crew or Air Traffic Control were responsible. The majority absolved the controllers as the plane was not on a published approach segment; the dissenting opinion was that the flight had been radar vectored. Terminology between pilots and controllers differed without either group being aware of the discrepancy. It was common practice at the time for controllers to release a flight to its own navigation with "Cleared for the approach," and flight crews commonly believed that was also authorization to descend to the altitude at which the final segment of the approach began. No clear indication had been given by controllers to Flight 514 that they were no longer on a radar vector segment and therefore responsible for their own navigation. Procedures were clarified after this accident. Controllers now state, "Maintain (specified altitude) until established on a published segment of the approach," and pilots now understand that previously assigned altitudes prevail until an altitude change is authorized on the published approach segment the aircraft is currently flying. Ground proximity warning system (GPWS) was also mandated for the airlines.

During the NTSB investigation, it was discovered that a United Airlines flight had very narrowly escaped the same fate during the same approach and at the same location only six weeks prior. This discovery set in motion activities that led to the development of the Aviation Safety Reporting System (ASRS) by the FAA and NASA in April 1976 to collect voluntary, confidential reports of possible safety hazards from aviation professionals.

Notably, the accident drew undesired attention to the Mount Weather facility, which was the linchpin of plans implemented by the federal government to ensure continuity in the event of a nuclear war. The crash did not damage the facility, since most of its features were underground. Only its underground main phone line was severed, with service to the complex being restored by C&P Telephone within 2 1/2 hours after the crash.

== Aftermath ==
In the wake of dozens of lawsuits filed with the US District Court in Alexandria, Virginia by families of the victims, a deal brokered one year after the crash by the Justice Department had TWA and the FAA agreeing to share damages and settle any lawsuits out of court.

The crash, its aftermath, and its repercussions are the subject of the 1977 book Sound of Impact: The Legacy of TWA Flight 514 by Adam Shaw. TWA Flight 514 is also mentioned in the closing of the second chapter of Mark Oliver Everett's book Things the Grandchildren Should Know and in F. Lee Bailey's book Cleared for the Approach: In Defense of Flying. In 2015, a documentary titled Diverted: TWA 514 was released.

== Northwest Flight 6231 ==
This was one of two Boeing 727s to crash in the U.S. that day; the other was Northwest Orient Airlines Flight 6231 in New York state, on its way to pick up the Baltimore Colts football team in Buffalo.

== Notable Fatality ==
Roscoe Cartwright, one of the U.S. Army's first black generals, was killed in the crash; he had retired from active duty several months earlier and was accompanied by his wife.

== Crash site then and now ==
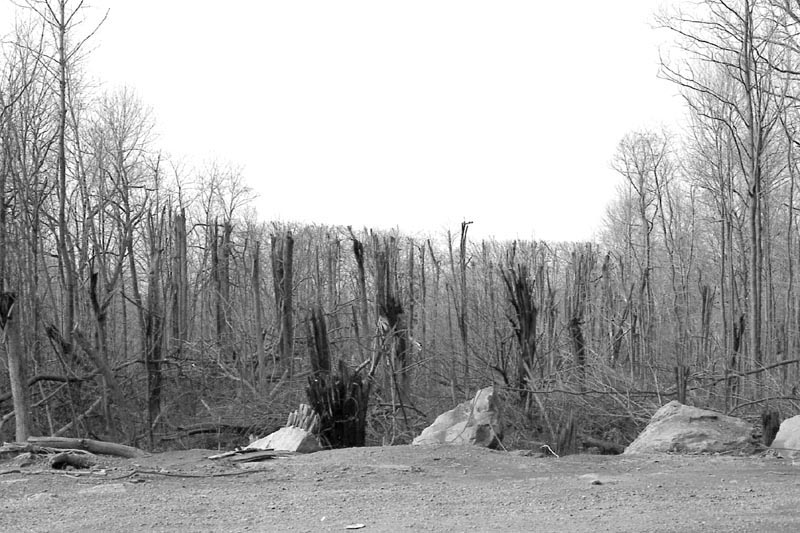
Approx Dec 1975; looking west from road

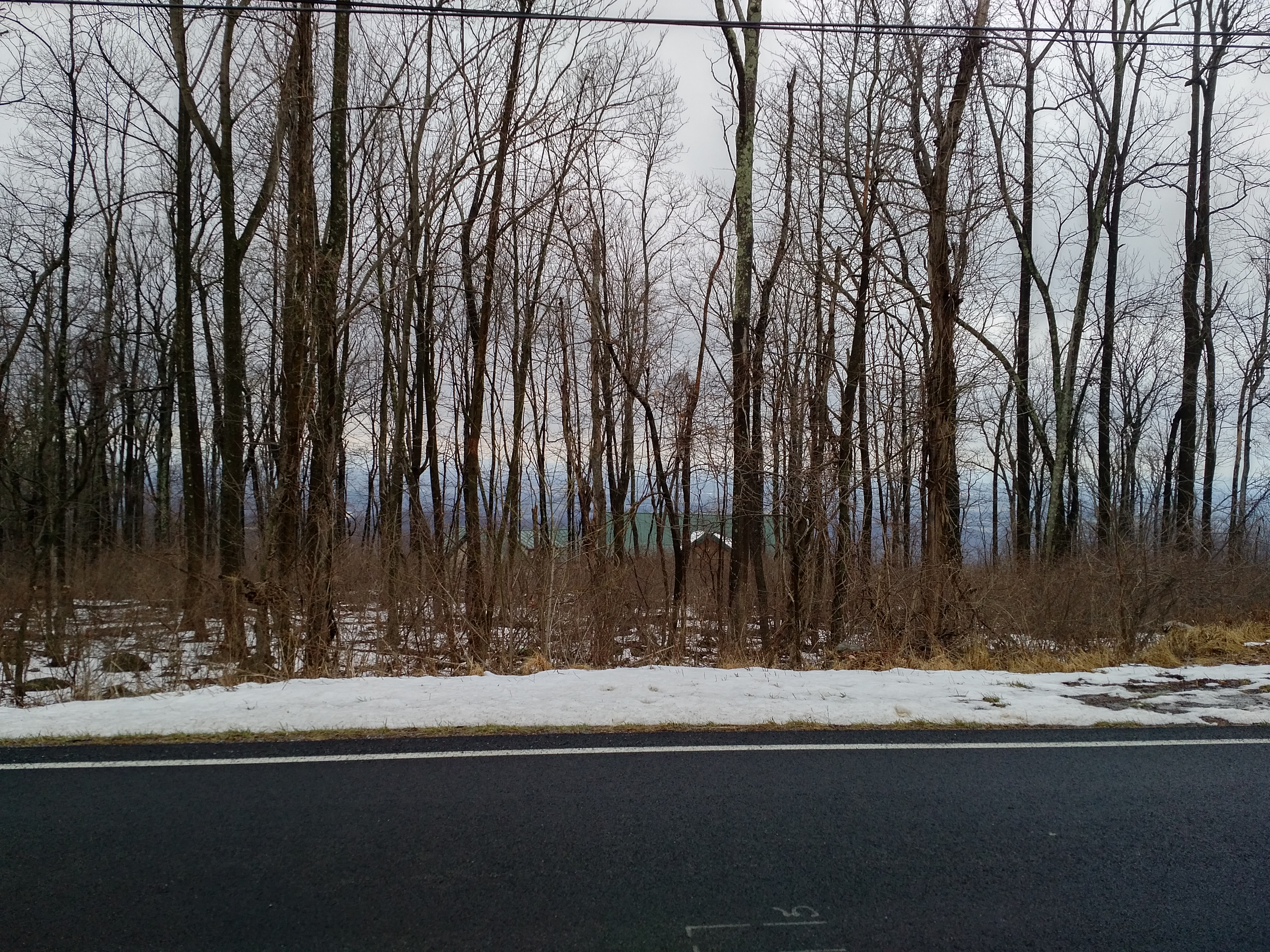
Same view looking west in March 2017

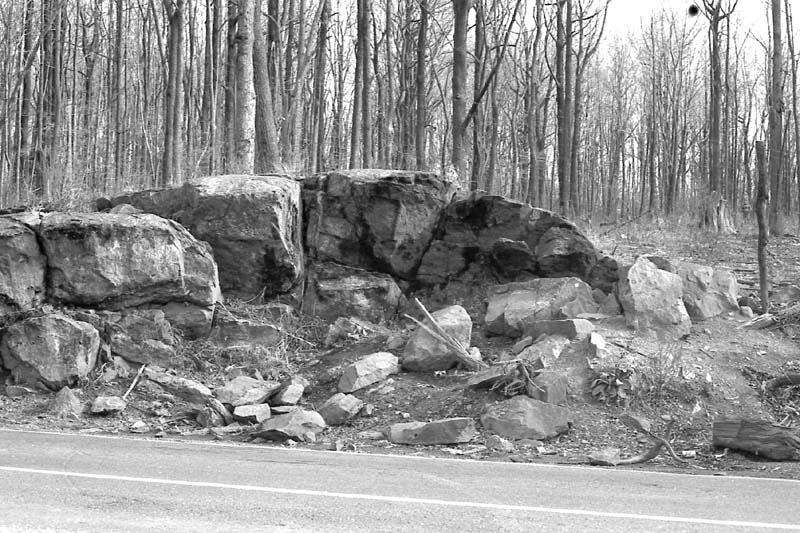
Approx Dec 1975; The outcropping, looking east from road

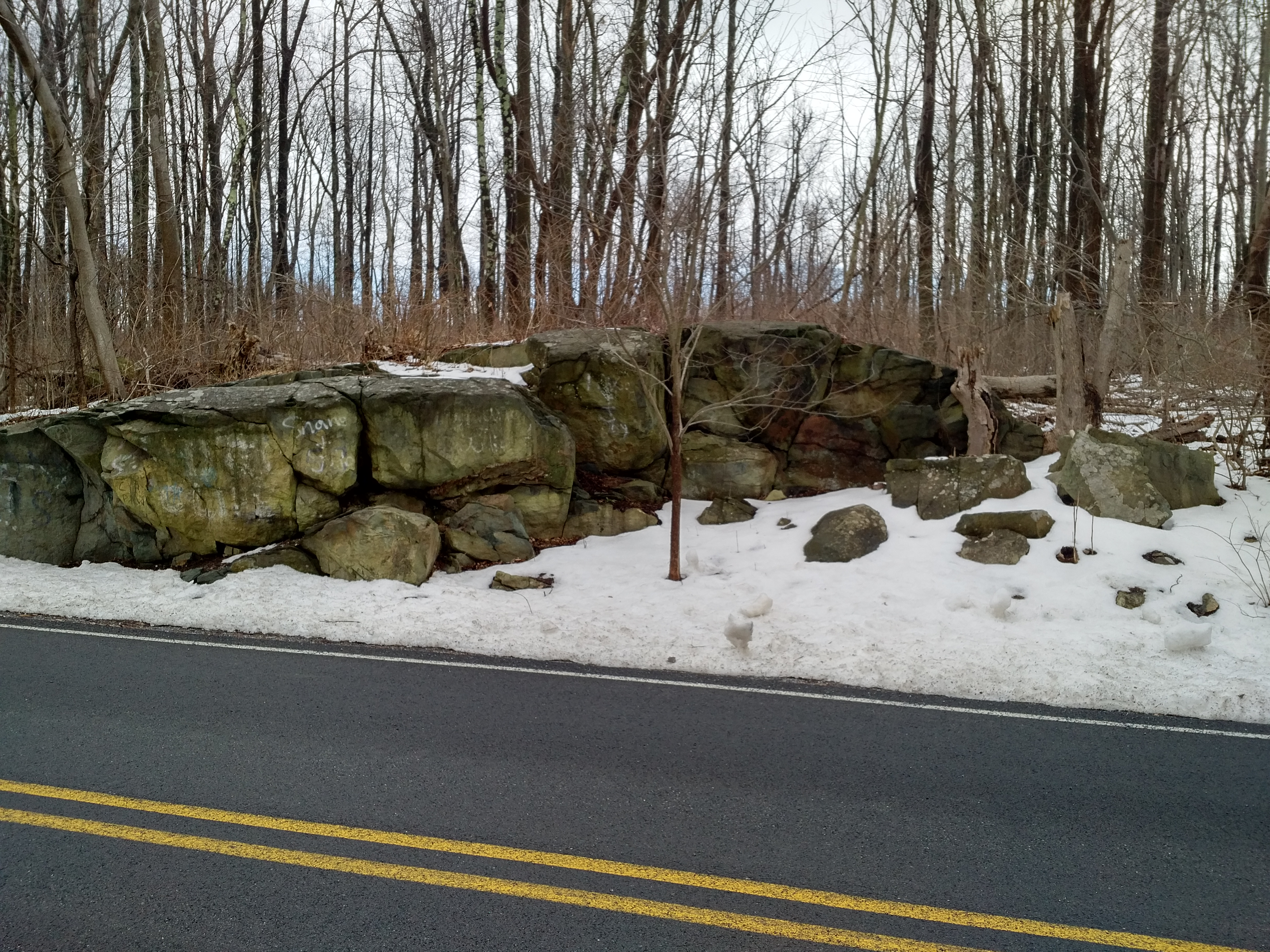
Same view looking east in March 2017, the outcropping is a bit further NNE than the crash coordinates
