= Aviation Safety Reporting System =

US Federal Aviation Administration's (FAA) voluntary confidential reporting system

The Aviation Safety Reporting System, or ASRS, is the US Federal Aviation Administration's (FAA) voluntary confidential reporting system that allows pilots, air traffic controllers, cabin crew, dispatchers, maintenance technicians, ground operations, and UAS operators and drone flyers to confidentially report near misses or close call events in the interest of improving aviation safety. The ASRS collects, analyzes, and responds to voluntarily submitted aviation safety incident reports in order to reduce the likelihood of aviation accidents. The ASRS was designed and is operated by NASA, who is seen as a neutral third-party due to its lack of enforcement authority and relations with airlines. The confidential and independent nature of the ASRS is key to its long-term success in identifying numerous latent system hazards in the National Airspace System (NAS). The FAA extends limited immunity to individual aviation workers for reporting safety events which do not result in an accident, as defined by the FAA. This has the effect of encouraging these potential reporters to come forward with systemic safety issues without fear of reprisal. The success of the system stands as a positive example used as a model by other industries seeking to make improvements in safety. Other industries who have modeled similar systems on the ASRS include the rail, medical, firefighters, and off-shore petroleum production.

== Reporting process ==
A notable feature of the ASRS is its confidentiality and immunity policy. Reporters may, but are not required to, submit their name and contact information. If the ASRS staff has questions regarding a report, it can perform a callback and request further information or clarification from the reporter. Once the staff is satisfied with the information received, the report is stripped of identifying information and assigned a report number. The part of the reporting form with contact information is detached and returned to the reporter. ASRS will issue alerts to relevant parties, such as airlines, air traffic controllers, manufacturers, and airport authorities if NASA considers the issue to be significant to improved aviation safety. The ASRS also publishes a monthly newsletter highlighting safety issues, and now has an online database of reports that is accessible by the public. This database makes a large body of de-identified reports available to safety researchers world-wide. In addition, the ASRS occasionally conducts special studies on topics of interest to researchers and regulators. These special studies are also made available on the ASRS website.

== Immunity policy ==
The first government official to advocate the use of an immunity policy was Bobbie R. Allen, Director of the Civil Aeronautics Board. In 1966 - twelve years before ASRS was launched, Bobbie R. Allen, Director of the Bureau of Aviation Safety, was advocating the use of computers and the concept of non-punitive incident reporting. In a Nov 1966 speech at a Flight Safety Foundation seminar in Madrid, Allen stated:

“We must find a way of moving this raw material for accident prevention to the processing machine.” He further stated: "What is it, then, that stands in the way of communicating this incident information to the appropriate governmental agency for processing? Repeatedly, when this question is asked, one hears the reply-FEAR: fear of litigation; fear of regulation; fear of punitive action."

Often, reports are submitted because a rule was accidentally broken. The FAA's immunity policy encourages submission of all safety incidents and observations, especially information that could prevent a major accident, even if a violation occurs. If enforcement action is taken by the FAA against an accidental rule violation that did not result in an accident, a reporter can present their ASRS ID strip as proof that the incident was reported to NASA in the interest of aviation safety. Reporters do not have to share their report with the FAA and NASA will not share the report with the FAA. The FAA considers the submission of the report as evidence of a "constructive attitude" and will not impose a penalty. However, this immunity can only be exercised once every five years, though an unlimited number of reports can be filed.

== Statistical validity ==
Due to the self-selected, or voluntary nature of the reports to the ASRS, NASA cautions against statistical use of the data they contain. On the other hand, they do express considerable confidence in the reliability of the reports submitted:

"However, the ASRS can say with certainty that its database provides definitive lower-bound estimates of the frequencies at which various types of aviation safety events actually occur. For example, 34,404 altitude overshoots were reported to the ASRS from January 1988 through December 1994. It can be confidently concluded that at least this number of overshoots occurred during the 1988-94 period--and probably many more. Often, such lower-bound estimates are all that decision makers need to determine that a problem exists and requires attention."

== Use in safety research ==
ASRS data are also used in targeted safety studies by NASA, regulators and independent researchers. Because the database contains detailed narrative reports from pilots, controllers and other front-line personnel, it has been employed to examine issues such as general aviation weather encounters, inadvertent flight from visual to instrument meteorological conditions, low-altitude operations and helicopter air ambulance risk factors. These studies typically treat ASRS as a qualitative source that helps identify recurring patterns, human factors and operational contexts, complementing accident statistics and formal investigations rather than replacing them.

== History ==
The need for a system of recording and cataloging aviation safety's institutional knowledge and shared history was apparent long before ASRS came to fruition. In testimony before the U.S. Senate on legislation proposing the Federal Aviation Act of 1958, United Airlines president William A. Patterson touched the concept: "On the positive side," said Mr. Patterson, "you take your statistics - and your records - and your exposures - and you act before the happening!“

Several years later, speaking before a Flight Safety Foundation International Air Safety Seminar in Madrid in November 1966, Bobbie R. Allen, the Director of the Bureau of Safety of the U.S. Civil Aeronautics Board, referred to the vast body of accumulated aviation safety incident information as a "sleeping giant." Noting that fear of legal liability and of regulatory or disciplinary action had prevented the dissemination of this information, rendering it valueless to those who might use it to combat hazards in the aviation system, Mr. Allen commented:

In the event that the fear of exposure cannot be overcome by other means, it might be profitable if we explored a system of incident reporting which would assure a substantial flow of vital information to the computer for processing, and at the same time, would provide some method designed to effectively eliminate the personal aspect of the individual occurrences so that the information derived would be helpful to all and harmful to none.

— Bobbie R. Allen, Flight Safety Foundation seminar, November 1966

See Aviation Safety Reporting System, Early History to view early letters, speeches and memos.

According to the National Transportation Safety Board, ASRS was first incepted in 1976 by Charles Billings.

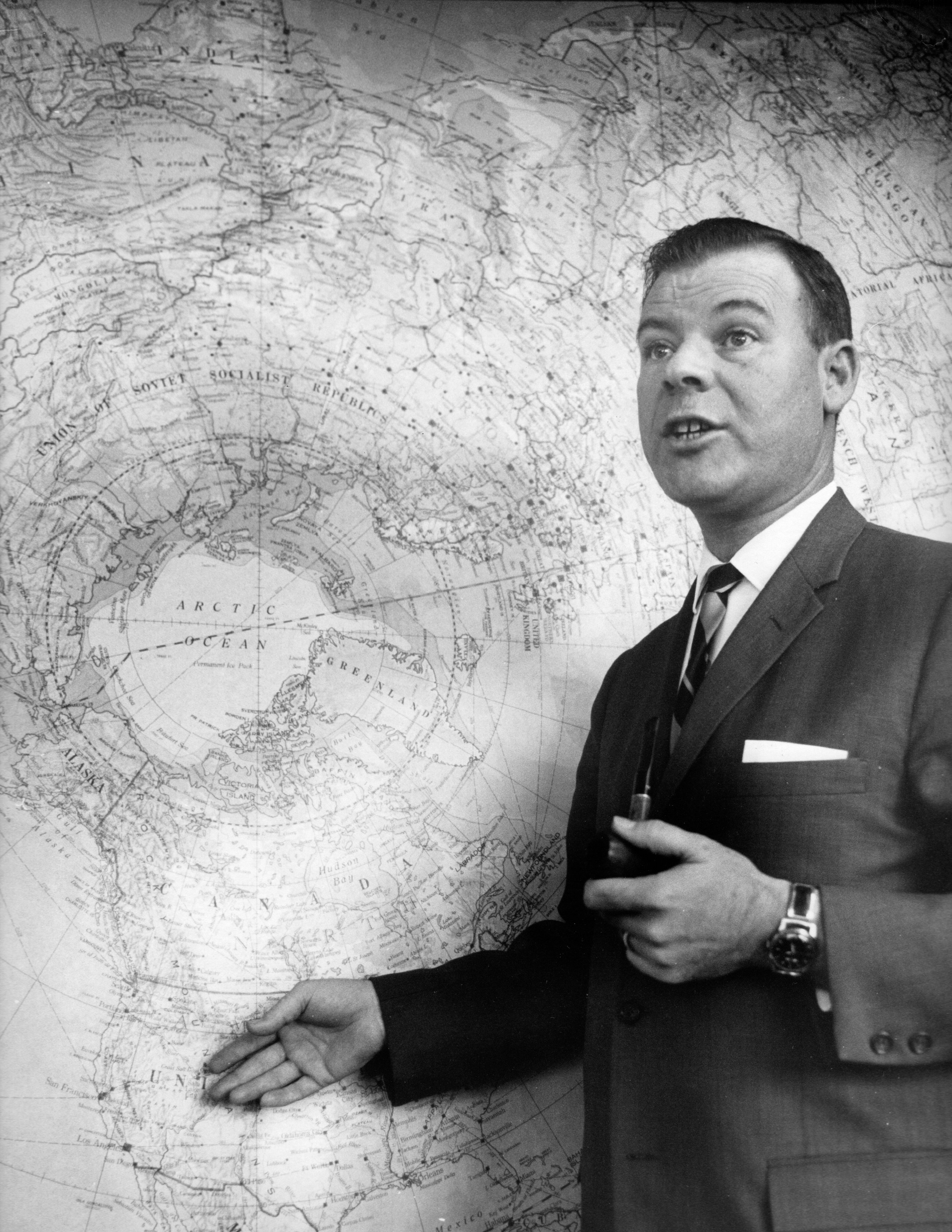
Bobbie R. Allen, Director, Bureau of Aviation Safety, NTSB
